= Gianluigi Braschi =

Italian film producer

- Born: 2 July 1963; Cesena, Italy
- Died: 23 October 2008 (aged 45); San Raffaele Hospital, Milan, Italy
- Occupation: Film producer

Gianluigi Braschi (2 July 1963 – 23 October 2008) was an Italian film producer.

He was born in Cesena, Italy on 2 July 1963. He was the younger brother of actress Nicoletta Braschi, who married Roberto Benigni so he worked frequently with him in comedy films. He began working as a production assistant on Johnny Stecchino (1991). In 1994 he formed Melampo Cinematographic production house along with his sister and brother-in-law. He continued to work with Benigni in Il mostro (1994), Pinocchio (2002) and The Tiger and the Snow (2005).

He co-produced the hugely successful film Life Is Beautiful (1997) with Elda Ferri, for which they both received an Academy Award nomination for Best Picture. The film also earned them a David di Donatello for Best Producer, as well as a European Film Award for Best Film.

He died on 23 October 2008 after a long illness aged 45. The funeral was in Cesena on 25 October at convento delle Clarisse.

== Filmography ==
- La tigre e la neve (2005)
- Pinocchio (2002)
- Life Is Beautiful (1997)
- Roberto Benigni: Tuttobenigni 95/96 (1996)
- The Monster (1994)
