= Chiara Moretti =

Italian actress (1955–2023)

- Born: 18 August 1955; Siena, Italy
- Died: 16 May 2023 (aged 67); Florence, Italy
- Occupation: Actress

Chiara Moretti (8 August 1955 – 16 May 2023) was an Italian actress.

== Biography ==
Born in Siena, Moretti started her acting career in the second half of the 1970s, appearing alongside Roberto Benigni in a series of projects, including the films Berlinguer, I Love You by Giuseppe Bertolucci and in Seeking Asylum by Marco Ferreri, where she played the main female character Irma. Later she had other significant roles in the films Maschio, femmina, fiore, frutto and Se tutto va bene siamo rovinati; she made her last appearance in Bertolucci's The Strangeness of Life (1987).

Leaving acting, she devoted herself to politics as a member of the National Alliance and later of Brothers of Italy. She was the councillor of District 5 of the Municipality of Florence, from 2004 to 2014.

Moretti died in May 2023, in Florence, at the age of 67.
