= Gabriella Cristiani =

Italian film editor

Gabriella Cristiani (born in Foggia on 22 May 1949) is an Italian film editor with about twenty feature film credits. She has had a notable collaboration with director Bernardo Bertolucci. Early in her career she assisted editor Franco Arcalli on two of Bertolucci's films, Last Tango in Paris (1972) and 1900 (1976). Arcalli was the "supervising editor" on a 1977 film, Berlinguer, I Love You, that was one of Cristiani's first feature editing credits; the film was directed by Giuseppe Bertolucci – Bernardo's brother. Arcalli was to have edited Bernardo Bertolucci's next film, La Luna (1979), but he died during production; Cristiani, who was assisting, then took over as editor.

Cristiani edited Bernardo Bertolucci's 1982 film Tragedy of a Ridulous Man. She won the Academy Award for Best Film Editing for The Last Emperor (1987), which won a total of 9 Oscars (including Best Picture and Best Director (for Bertolucci)) as well as numerous other honors. Cristiani's work on Bertolucci's next film, The Sheltering Sky (1990), is noted for a technical innovation, which was the "nonlinear" editing of the film using digital techniques. Sheltering Sky was Cristiani's final film with Bertolucci. Cristiani has edited films over the last decade with several different directors, and she herself directed and edited the 1999 film, Ladies Room.

== Filmography as editor ==
- Teleios (Truitner-2016)
- Матч (Malyukov-2012)
- Kandagar (Kavun-2010)
- Falene (Maldonado-2009)
- One Night with the King (Sajbel-2006)
- Il natale rubato (Tordiglione-2003)
- Morning (Mann-2000)
- Ladies Room (director Gabriella Cristiani 1999)
- Savior (Antonijević-1998)
- The Sheltering Sky (B. Bertolucci-1990)
- Francesco (Cavani-1989)
- Kumbha Mela (Antonioni-1989); co-edited with Antonioni and Fiorenza Muller.
- The Last Emperor (B. Bertolucci-1987)
- High Season (Peploe—1987)
- Cartolina dalla Cina (1985)
- Sogno di una notte d'estate (Salvatores-1983)
- Sconcerto rock (1982)
- Tu mi turbi (Benigni-1982)
- Tragedy of a Ridiculous Man (B. Bertolucci-1981)
- Panni sporchi, (G. Bertolucci-1980)
- Oggetti smarriti (G. Bertolucci-1980)
- La Luna (B. Bertolucci-1979)
- Berlinguer, I Love You (G. Bertolucci-1977)
- Io sono mia (Scandurra-1977)
- Fiorina la vacca (De Sisti-1972)

== See also ==
- List of film director and editor collaborations
