= Son of the Pink Panther =

1993 film by Blake Edwards

- Theatrical release poster
- Directed by: Blake Edwards
- Screenplay by: Blake Edwards; Madeline Sunshine; Steve Sunshine
- Story by: Blake Edwards
- Based on: Characters by Blake Edwards; Maurice Richlin
- Produced by: Tony Adams
- Starring: Roberto Benigni; Herbert Lom; Debrah Farentino; Robert Davi; Shabana Azmi; Claudia Cardinale
- Cinematography: Dick Bush
- Edited by: Robert Pergament
- Music by: Henry Mancini
- Production companies: United Artists; Filmauro S.r.l.
- Distributed by: Metro-Goldwyn-Mayer (United States); Filmauro S.r.l. (Italy); United International Pictures (International)
- Release dates: August 27, 1993 (United States); December 17, 1993 (Italy)
- Running time: 93 minutes
- Countries: United States; Italy
- Languages: English; Italian
- Budget: $28 million
- Box office: $20 million

Son of the Pink Panther is a 1993 comedy film. It is the ninth and final installment of the original The Pink Panther film series starting from the 1963 film. Directed by Blake Edwards, it stars Roberto Benigni as Inspector Jacques Clouseau's illegitimate son Jacques Gambrelli. Also in this film are Panther regulars Herbert Lom, Burt Kwouk and Graham Stark and a star of the original 1963 film, Claudia Cardinale. It was the final film for both director Blake Edwards and composer Henry Mancini; Mancini died on June 14, 1994, and Edwards retired from film-making in 1995.

== Plot ==
Princess Yasmin of Lugash is abducted in French territorial waters off the coast of Nice by terrorists led by mercenary Hans in order to force her father King Haroak to abdicate and allow her disgraced stepmother's lover Jaffar, a military general with terrorist ties to a neighboring kingdom, to claim the throne. Police Commissioner Charles Dreyfus is tasked with solving the case of Yasmin's disappearance. While investigating in the South of France, he has a run-in with the kidnappers and local gendarme Jacques Gambrelli. Jacques opens the doors of Hans' van and unknowingly spots Yasmin who he believes is Hans' sister en route to the hospital.

Not wanting any witnesses, Hans sends his henchmen to kill Jacques. Dreyfus follows him to the hospital and observes. The bumbling Jacques eventually gets his bicycle stuck in a wet cement sidewalk outside the hospital. Hans' henchmen spot Jacques but Dreyfus intervenes and saves him. Jacques then takes Dreyfus to his home where he lives with his mother Maria whom Dreyfus recognizes as a suspect in a murder case 30 years ago. Maria says Jacques is actually the illegitimate son of the late Inspector Jacques Clouseau. Hans' men attempt to plant a bomb under the Gambrelli house, which leads to Dreyfus becoming injured instead and sent to the hospital.

While Maria decides to stay beside the injured Dreyfus to see him recover, Jacques learns of his origins from them. He decides to rescue Yasmin and prove himself Closeau's true heir and legacy. At the hospital, Jacques recognizes Yussa, Hans' henchwoman. Yussa wants a doctor for Hans, who was injured after Yasmin attempted to escape. Impersonating a doctor, Jacques gains access to the terrorists' hideout and attempts to treat the injured Hans. Jacques accidentally stabs himself in the cheek with a needle filled with Novocaine and gets locked up with Yasmin.

Hans decides to move his safe house to Lugash and sends his men to kill Jacques by placing him in a van and rolling it down a steep road off a cliff. However, Jacques manages to escape. Seeking help, Jacques travels to Paris to look up Clouseau's old friends and meets Closeau's former manservant Cato Fong who directs him to Clouseau's former costumer Professor Auguste Balls. Balls makes new disguises for them to travel to Lugash and rescue Yasmin. Jacques and Cato fly to Lugash. At a local restaurant, they meet a government agent who reveals the location of Hans' new hideout, a castle located outside the Lugash capital city. Aided by the Lugash Army and Cato, Jacques enters the castle, defeats the terrorists and rescues Yasmin.

In France, Jacques is promoted to detective and transfers to Paris' metro police force as an Inspector. He attends the wedding of Maria and Dreyfus, who have gotten engaged during their time together in the hospital. During the reception, Maria tells Dreyfus that she in fact had twins from her one-time tryst with Clouseau. To Dreyfus' shock, Jacques' twin sister Jacqueline appears there and turns out to be just a clumsy and dim-witted as her brother.

At a ceremony in Lugash, Haroak and Yasmin award Jacques with a special medal for his heroic rescue. The event is attended by Maria, Dreyfus, Cato, Balls and Jacqueline. However, his clumsy antics disrupt the proceedings. The film ends with Jacques saying, "That felt good!" before it freeze frames. The animated Pink Panther walks across the screen, when the cartoon Jacques suddenly cuts away his own head and it drops onto the Panther’s foot, enraging him and chases him into fading blackness.

== Cast ==
- Roberto Benigni as Gendarme Jacques Gambrelli
- Herbert Lom as Police Commissioner Charles Dreyfus
- Claudia Cardinale as Maria Gambrelli
- Shabana Azmi as Queen
- Debrah Farentino as Princess Yasmin
- Burt Kwouk as Cato Fong
- Robert Davi as Hans Zarba
- Anton Rodgers as Chief Lazar
- Jennifer Edwards as Yussa
- Mark Schneider as Arnon
- Mike Starr as Hanif
- Kenny Spalding as Garth
- Graham Stark as Professor Auguste Balls
- Oliver Cotton as King Haroak
- Aharon Ipalé as General Jaffar
- Natasha Pavlovich as Rima
- Henry Goodman as Andre
- Dermot Crowley as Sergeant François Duval
- Liz Smith as Marta Balls
- Selva Rasalingam as Customs Official
- Nadim Sawalha as Lugash Agent
- Badi Uzzaman as Wasim
- Nicoletta Braschi as Jacqueline Gambrelli
- Bobby McFerrin as Himself
- Henry Mancini as Himself

== Production ==
This was the first Pink Panther film in a decade, following 1982's Trail of the Pink Panther and 1983's Curse of the Pink Panther, two ill-received attempts to continue the series following the death of Peter Sellers, who originated the character of Inspector Jacques Clouseau. Considered a relaunch of the series, the plan was for the film to focus on Jacques Gambrelli, Clouseau's illegitimate son. Initially, Blake Edwards tapped Kevin Kline for the role. Kline was a fan of the series and loved Edwards' previous films but decided after reading the script that the project just wouldn't work. Kline would eventually play Dreyfus in the 2006 remake. Afterwards, Rowan Atkinson was offered the part, having also previously been offered the role of Sergeant Clifton Sleigh (Ted Wass) in Curse of the Pink Panther. Gérard Depardieu was the next casting choice. According to producer Tony Adams, Depardieu was "very interested" in the role when first approached in 1989 but he was no longer available by the time production was ready to begin.

When Giancarlo Parretti took control of Metro-Goldwyn-Mayer in 1990, MGM-Pathé Communications withdrew financing from the project and Edwards sued the studio in the Los Angeles County Superior Court. When Alan Ladd, Jr. came aboard, MGM settled out of court with Edwards. Ladd greenlit the film but Depardieu was no longer available, due to a scheduling conflict with Ridley Scott's 1492: Conquest of Paradise. Edwards then wanted Roberto Benigni — a popular Italian comedian who had yet to be discovered in America — after viewing his performances in Jim Jarmusch's Down by Law (1986) and in his self-directed Johnny Stecchino (1991).

Securing Benigni in late 1991 found the film much-needed third party financing from Aurelio De Laurentiis, who provided nearly half of the film's $28 million budget in exchange for the rights to distribute it in Italy. Filming started 8 June 1992 in Saint-Paul-de-Vence and production finished 4 months later, taking place in Pinewood Studios and the country of Jordan. During the film's final battle, the soldiers were played by real-life Jordanian Special Operation Forces paratroopers. Kroyer Films made the animated Pink Panther character and the animated persona of Jacques in a live action sequence for the intro. The opening Pink Panther sequence cost an estimated $1 million.

A journalist from The Roanoke Times asked Edwards why he made Son of the Pink Panther. Edwards replied while laughing, "I think it's principally greed, and some small percentage that I hate to see something that has kind of become an institution languish and die." Claudia Cardinale played Princess Dala in the original The Pink Panther film. Here, she returns as Maria Gambrelli, the part originally played by Elke Sommer in A Shot in the Dark.

== Soundtrack ==
The film's soundtrack album was released by Milan Records. Henry Mancini makes a cameo appearance during the opening credits passing the baton to the animated Pink Panther.

1. "The Pink Panther Theme" - arranged and performed by Bobby McFerrin (3:10)
2. "Son of the Pink Panther" (1:33)
3. "The Snatch" (2:22)
4. "God Bless Clouseau" - music by Henry Mancini, lyrics by Leslie Bricusse (2:01)
5. "Samba de Jacques" (2:24)
6. "The Gambrelli Theme" (2:23)
7. "The Bike Chase" (1:52)
8. "The Dreamy Princess" (3:58)
9. "Riot at Omar's" (2:40)
10. "Mama and Dreyfus" (1:43)
11. "Rendez-vous with Cato" (1:53)
12. "The King's Palace" (1:47)
13. "The Showdown" (3:31)
14. "The Pink Panther Theme" (tenor sax solo: Phil Todd) (4:18)

== Reception ==
Son of the Pink Panther was universally panned by critics and failed to generate commercial success. In 2015 Radio Times magazine gave the film only 1 star out of 5. On review aggregator Rotten Tomatoes, the film has an approval rating of 6% based on 34 critic reviews, with an average score of 3.40/10. The website's consensus reads, "Roberto Benigni is an undeniably gifted physical comic, but the misguided Son of [the] Pink Panther betrays his energetic efforts with a painfully unfunny script". On Metacritic, the film has a score of 33 out of 100 based on 19 critics, indicating "generally unfavorable reviews". Audiences surveyed by CinemaScore gave the film a grade of "C+" on scale of A+ to F. Benigni's performance in the film earned him nomination for the Golden Raspberry Award for Worst New Star in 1994, though he lost to Janet Jackson for Poetic Justice at the 14th Golden Raspberry Awards.

In its release in the United States and Canada, it only grossed $2.4 million. However, the film was a top hit in Italy with a gross of $18 million and became the highest-grossing Italian blockbuster ever, despite being considered a box-office bomb everywhere else. Before the film's release, Adams confirmed that he and MGM planned to release more sequels to the film with Benigni reprising his role as Jacques but these plans were cancelled due to Son of the Pink Panther's poor reception.
