= Secrets Secrets =

- Directed by: Giuseppe Bertolucci
- Written by: Giuseppe Bertolucci; Vincenzo Cerami
- Starring: Lina Sastri
- Cinematography: Renato Tafuri
- Edited by: Nino Baragli
- Music by: Nicola Piovani
- Release date: 1985
- Language: Italian

Segreti segreti (internationally released as Secrets Secrets) is a 1985 Italian drama film directed by Giuseppe Bertolucci. For this film Lina Sastri was awarded with a David di Donatello for Best Actress. The film was on first viewing TV Monday 15 December 1986 on Canale 5 at 20:30 (then it was broadcast other times on Telemontecarlo, on RAI or on local TVs in any region).

== Cast ==
- Lina Sastri: Laura
- Lea Massari: Marta, Laura's mother
- Giulia Boschi: Rosa
- Rossana Podestà: Maria, Rosa's mother
- Alida Valli: Gina
- Stefania Sandrelli: Renata
- Mariangela Melato: Giuliana
- Nicoletta Braschi
- Massimo Ghini
- Francesca Archibugi
- Sandra Ceccarelli
