= Nothing Left to Do But Cry =

Nothing Left to Do But Cry (Non ci resta che piangere)
- Original film poster
- Directed by: Roberto Benigni; Massimo Troisi
- Screenplay by: Giuseppe Bertolucci; Roberto Benigni; Massimo Troisi
- Story by: Roberto Benigni; Massimo Troisi
- Produced by: Mauro Berardi; Ettore Rosboch
- Starring: Roberto Benigni; Massimo Troisi; Iris Peynado; Amanda Sandrelli; Carlo Monni; Paolo Bonacelli
- Cinematography: Giuseppe Rotunno
- Edited by: Nino Baragli
- Music by: Pino Donaggio
- Distributed by: Cecchi Gori Group
- Release date: 20 December 1984
- Running time: 113 minutes
- Country: Italy
- Languages: Italian, Neapolitan
- Box office: $7 million (Italy)

Nothing Left to Do But Cry (Italian: Non ci resta che piangere) is a 1984 Italian fantasy comedy film written by, directed by and starring Roberto Benigni and Massimo Troisi.

== Distribution ==
Three different versions of the film were distributed. One version, never distributed in the home video market in any format, was the result of a different editing process meant for television release. The film was broadcast on TV for the first time on 8 December 1986, on Canale 5. In 2006 a new extended edition of the film was released on DVD, 18 minutes longer to show a greater development of the character of Astriaha. In March 2015 the film returned to Italian cinemas thanks to Lucky Red, which distributed a restored version of the comedy.

== Plot ==
The film opens in the Tuscan countryside. Mario (a janitor) and his friend Saverio (a teacher) are stopped at a level crossing, waiting for the train to pass. The two friends trust each other. Among other things, Saverio is worried about his sister Gabriella, who fell into depression after the failure of her relationship with an American boy. The wait continues and they eventually decide to travel down a road in the fields. After a while they find themselves with their car stuck in the middle of the countryside. When the evening comes, it begins to rain. The two find accommodation in an inn for the night, in a room that already hosts another person.

The next morning they wake up and are amused by the sight of the guest urinating out of the window, but their laughter is immediately truncated by the hiss of a spear that kills him. Mario and Saverio see people in a black cloak fleeing on horseback, then rush to the ground floor and find other people, all dressed in a strange way. In disbelief, they ask a man where they are and are told they are in Frittole, an imaginary Tuscan village, at the end of the 15th century. At first they consider it a joke in bad taste, they soon resign themselves to the harsh reality of having travelled back in time and manage to get hosted by Vitellozzo, the brother of the killed man, Remigio, who tells them of a terrible feud with a man named Giuliano del Capecchio, who is exterminating his family. Once in the village they meet Parisina, mother of Vitellozzo and the late Remigio, and begin to work in their butcher shop.

Saverio immediately becomes at ease with living in the Renaissance, while Mario does not want to settle down. However, during a religious function, Mario makes the acquaintance of Pia, a girl from a rich family, and falls in love with her. He begins to frequent her, showing himself outside of the wall surrounding her house. In the meantime, Vitellozzo is arrested and Saverio and Mario write a letter to Girolamo Savonarola, in vain, to obtain his liberation.

Saverio shows some annoyance with the meetings between Mario and the young Pia, keeps telling his friend to ask Pia if she has any female friend to introduce to him and complains that he always remains alone working in the butcher shop. Driven by his political-intellectual fervour, Saverio convinces his friend to travel to Spain, in order to reach Christopher Columbus and dissuade him from leaving for the Indies and discovering America. By doing this, Saverio intends to alter history so that in the future his sister cannot meet the American boy who left her. In an unspecified place the two come across a beautiful amazon, Astriaha, who intimidates them by throwing an arrow against their wagon.

At this point the story differs depending on the version, standard or extended.

=== Standard version ===
In France, Mario and Saverio come across Leonardo da Vinci. Driven by an unstoppable enthusiasm, they try to explain to him modern inventions such as the train, the thermometer, electricity and traffic lights; as Leonardo apparently struggles to understand their confused descriptions, the two resign themselves to just explaining him the popular card game of scopa.

In a tavern the two meet Astriaha, who tells them that her task was to prevent the arrival of any foreigner to Spain, to guarantee the departure of Columbus' ships. Hearing these words they rush to the Spanish coast, without seeing the three caravels at all.

The two try to return to Italy and with amazement they see smoke coming out of a locomotive. Convinced that they have returned to the 20th century, they are disappointed to discover that the driver is Leonardo, who made treasure of their teachings. Sensing their disappointment, he reassures them that the proceeds will be split in equal parts.

=== Extended version ===
In the extended version, the meeting with Leonardo is anticipated to make space for events that concern Astriaha.

The girl says that because of them she has not slept and has not eaten for three days and orders them to return to their boss, Alonso. Mario and Saverio do not know who Alonso is and try to clear themselves. As the girl passes out, Saverio helps her and he immediately falls in love with her. When she recovers, Astriaha forces the two men to follow her to her father. Saverio constantly courts her, but she does not seem to correspond his love, and in fact one night she goes up to the stable where Mario is lodging and they make love. Saverio sees them and the next morning he decides to take revenge. While Mario rests near a river, Saverio speaks to Astriaha and confides that Mario is actually a man from Alonso.

The woman, disdained, runs away. Mario gets angry, the two fight, beat each other, chase each other until they reach a beach. Together they call out the name of Columbus, but they discover that the three caravels have already sailed. Saverio reveals to Mario that the real reason he wanted to stop the navigator was to prevent his sister from forming a relationship with her American boyfriend.

The two versions join in the scene where the two protagonists run on the beach.

== Production ==
=== Filming ===
Benigni and Troisi said in an interview that the notorious customs scene was shot over and over again because the two were unable to remain serious. The two comedians, halfway through the film, had shot so much superfluous material that they were forced to erase some episodes, such as one that should have had their mutual friend Marco Messeri in the role of Savonarola.

The scene in which Benigni and Troisi write the letter to Girolamo Savonarola is a tribute to a scene of the film Toto, Peppino, and the Hussy, in which the protagonists write a perplexing letter to their nephew's girlfriend.

During filming in the Umbrian countryside Benigni and Troisi pranked Carlo Monni (Vitellozzo in the film), making him pronounce scurrilous things about Amanda Sandrelli's mother, Stefania, also a famous actress. Amanda, who had heard everything, went to Carlo Monni's camper and gave him a slap.

=== Places ===
Some scenes were shot at the Bracciano hospital and at the Capranica Scalo train station, where the level crossing from the film's beginning is located. The scene of the meeting with Leonardo da Vinci was filmed on the banks of the Pellicone pond, near Vulci, in the Maremma, inside the Etruscan archaeological area of the same name. The beach scene was shot in Cala di Forno, in the comune (municipality) of Magliano in Toscana, Tuscany.

== Cast ==
- Roberto Benigni as Saverio
- Massimo Troisi as Mario
- Iris Peynado as Astriaha
- Amanda Sandrelli as Pia
- Paolo Bonacelli as Leonardo da Vinci
- Carlo Monni: Vitellozzo

== Reception ==
The film was the highest-grossing film in Italy for the year with a gross of $7 million (14 billion lire).

== See also ==
- List of time travel science fiction films
- Leonardo da Vinci in fiction
