= Paolo Bonacelli =

Italian actor (1937–2025)

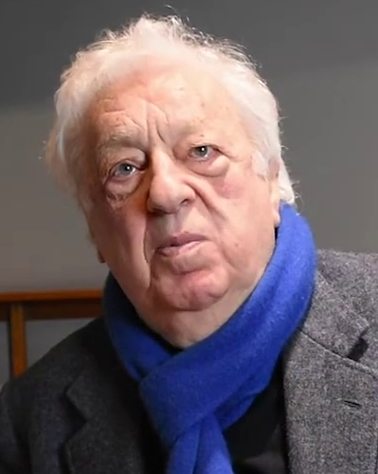
- Bonacelli in 2017
- Born: 28 February 1937; Rome, Italy
- Died: 8 October 2025 (aged 88); Rome, Italy
- Occupation: Actor
- Years active: 1964–2025
- Known for: Salò, or the 120 Days of Sodom; Midnight Express; Mission: Impossible III; The American
- Height: 1.77 m (5 ft 10 in)

Paolo Bonacelli (28 February 1937 – 8 October 2025) was an Italian stage and film actor.

== Life and career ==
Bonacelli graduated from the National Academy of Dramatic Arts in Rome. After debuting on stage in Vittorio Gassman's Questa sera si recita a soggetto, he had his first film role in Corpse for the Lady (1964). He appears (as the Duke) in Pier Paolo Pasolini's final film, Salò, or the 120 Days of Sodom (1975), as Rifki in Alan Parker's Midnight Express (1978), as Don Luigi Magalone in Christ Stopped at Eboli (1979), and as Cassius Chaerea in Tinto Brass' Caligula (1979). In addition, he worked under directors such as Michelangelo Antonioni, Roberto Rossellini, Elio Petri, and Liliana Cavani.

In 1985, he starred alongside Roberto Benigni and Massimo Troisi in Nothing Left to Do But Cry, a fantasy comedy film, in the role of Leonardo da Vinci.

In 1992, Bonacelli received the Nastro d'Argento for Best Supporting Actor for his performance in Roberto Benigni's Johnny Stecchino.

In 2006, he appeared in the Tom Cruise film Mission: Impossible III and in 2010's The American with George Clooney.

Bonacelli died on 8 October 2025, at the age of 88.

== Filmography ==
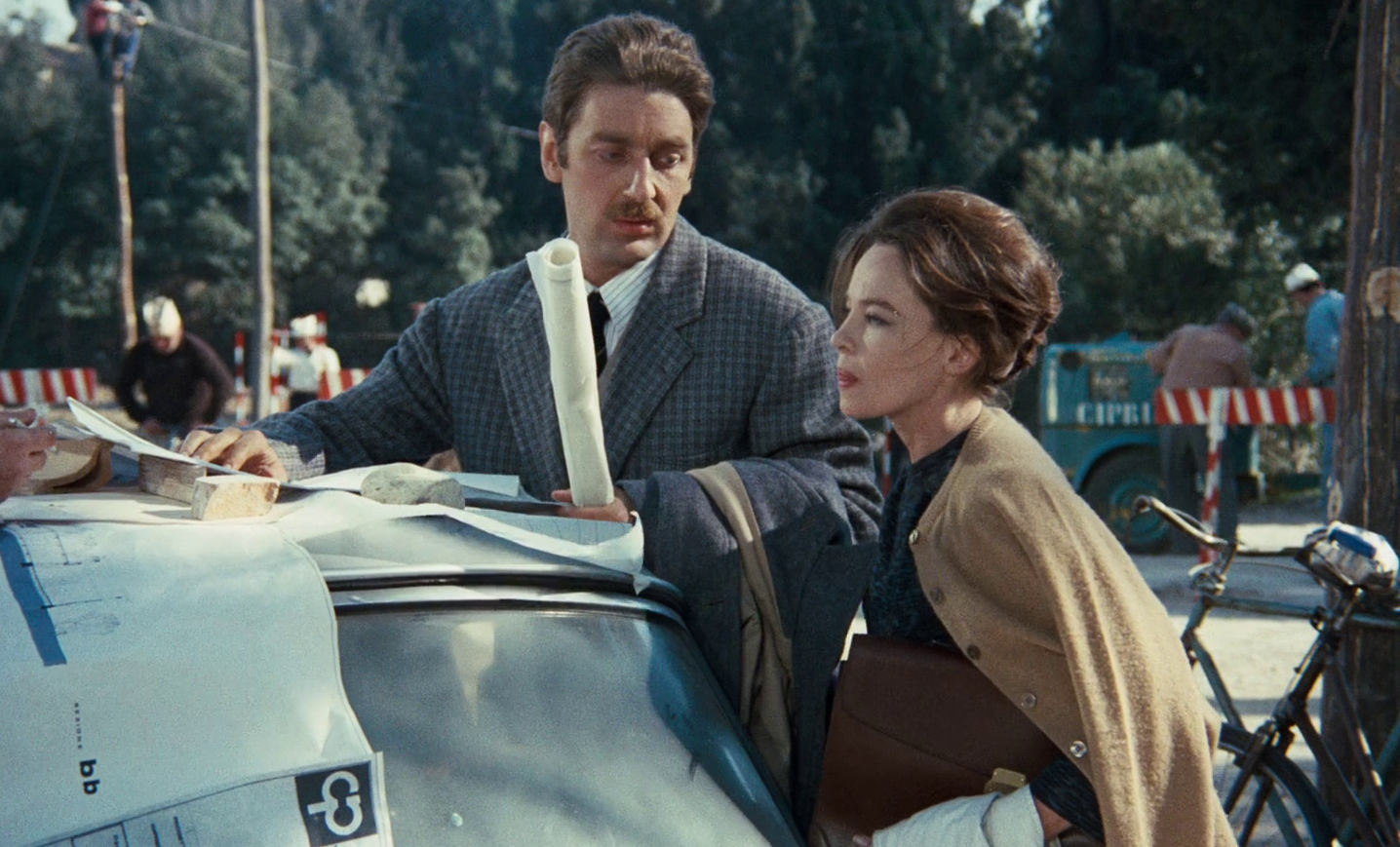
Bonacelli in The Head of the Family (1967), directed by Nanni Loy.

- Corpse for the Lady (1964) .... Gedeon
- Hard Time for Princes (1965) .... Zenone
- Super Seven Calling Cairo (1965) .... Capitano Hume (uncredited)
- Pleasant Nights (1966) .... Messenger
- The Devil in Love (1966) .... Inn's customer
- The Head of the Family (1967) .... Geometra
- Seven Times Seven (1968) .... (uncredited)
- Lady Barbara (1970) .... Edward
- Lacrime d'amore (1970) .... Cormick
- Una prostituta al servizio del pubblico e in regola con le leggi dello stato (1971)
- Maddalena (1971)
- Io e lui (1973) .... Vladimiro
- Giordano Bruno (1973)
- Milarepa (1974) .... Prof. Bennet
- The Murri Affair (1974) .... Francesco Bonmartini
- Anno uno (1974) .... Amendola
- Au-delà de la peur (1975) .... Francesco Grimaldi
- Salò, or the 120 Days of Sodom (1975) .... The Duke
- La banca di Monate (1975) .... Dottor Defendente Massera
- Al piacere di rivederla (1976) .... L'Usuraio
- Illustrious Corpses (1976) .... Dr. Maxia
- The Inheritance (1976) .... Paolo Furlin
- Evil Thoughts (1976) .... Antonio Marani
- Per questa notte (1977)
- Antonio Gramsci: The Days of Prison (1977) .... Bocchini
- Nest of Vipers (1977) .... Paolo Mazzarini
- Midnight Express (1978) .... Rifki
- Christ Stopped at Eboli (1979) .... Don Luigi Magalone
- Caligula (1979) .... Chaerea
- Good News (1979) .... Gualtiero Milano
- Il cappotto di Astrakan (1979) .... Ferdinando
- Le Guignolo (1980) .... Kamal
- The Mystery of Oberwald (1981) .... Count of Foehn
- Calderó (1981)
- Delitti, amore e gelosia (1982) .... Commissario Dell'Amore
- I Remember Nelson (1982) .... King Ferdinando
- Il cavaliere, la morte e il diavolo (1983) .... Nicholas
- Henry IV (1984) .... Belcredi
- Sole nudo (1984) .... Il cameriere
- Nothing Left to Do But Cry (1985) .... Leonardo da Vinci
- Mamma Ebe (1985) .... Don Paolo Monti
- Camorra (1986) .... Tango
- D'Annunzio (1987) .... Ercole Leoni
- Rimini Rimini (1987) .... Carlo Pedercini / Engineer
- Topo Galileo (1987)
- Francesco (1989) .... Francesco's Father
- Eleonora Pimentel (1990, TV Movie) .... The Judge
- Flight from Paradise (1990) .... Eliah
- Chi tocca muore (1991)
- Night on Earth (Tassisti di notte) (1991) .... Priest
- Johnny Stecchino (1992) .... D'Agata
- Ciao, Professore! (1992) .... Ludovico Mazzullo
- Mille bolle blu (1993) .... Mario Gora
- The Teddy Bear (1994) .... Novacek
- Once a Year, Every Year (1994) .... Romano
- Klon (1994) .... Prof. Zigote
- Vacanze di Natale '95 (1995) .... Paolone
- The Stendhal Syndrome (1996) .... Dr. Cavanna
- Il figlio di Bakunin (1997) .... Giudice
- Dirty Linen (1999, dir. Mario Monicelli) .... Amedeo
- Una furtiva lacrima (1999)
- Scarlet Diva (2000) .... Swiss Journalist
- Gli astronomi (2002)
- The Accidental Detective (2003) .... Direttore della Galleria Palatina
- A.A.A. Achille (2003) .... Dott. Aglieri
- 13 at a Table (2004) .... Nonno Giulio
- Mission: Impossible III (2006) .... Monsignore
- Un attimo sospesi (2006) .... Professore
- The American (2010) .... Father Benedetto
- La macchinazione (2016)
- Magical Nights (2018) .... Ennio
- Comandante (2023) .... Betti
- In the Hand of Dante (2025) .... Adult Priest of Alcamo
