= Carlo Monni =

Italian film, television, and stage actor

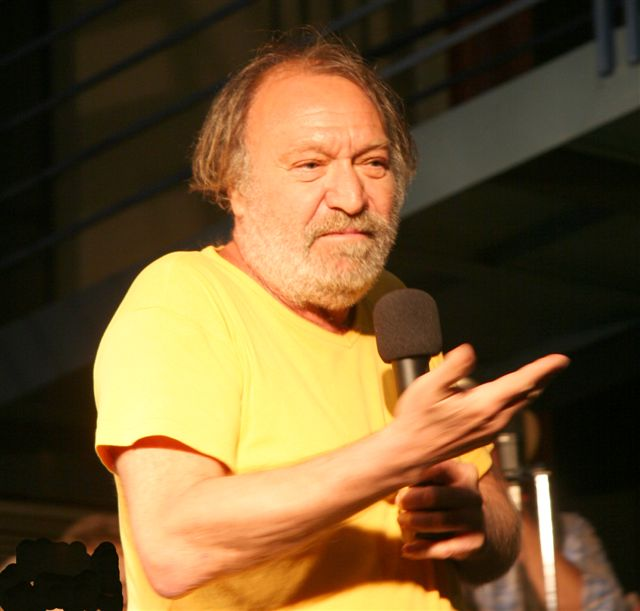
- Monni during a show (2008)
- Born: 23 October 1943; Campi Bisenzio, Florence, Italy
- Died: 19 May 2013 (aged 69); Florence, Italy
- Occupation: Actor
- Height: 1.76 m (5 ft 9 in)

Carlo Monni (23 October 1943 – 19 May 2013) was an Italian film, television and stage actor.

Born in Campi Bisenzio, Florence, Monni started his artistic activity in early seventies, as an actor in the Tuscan vernacular comic theater. After having played some minor roles in a number of low-budget films, the popularity came in the second half of 1970s, as the sidekick of his real life friend Roberto Benigni in a series of successful stage works, TV-programs, and then films (Berlinguer, I Love You, Seeking Asylum, Tu mi turbi, Nothing Left to Do But Cry). From then Monni started a productive career as a character actor, collecting over 300 appearances between cinema and theater.
