= Alessandro Bergonzoni =

Italian actor, playwright, and comedian

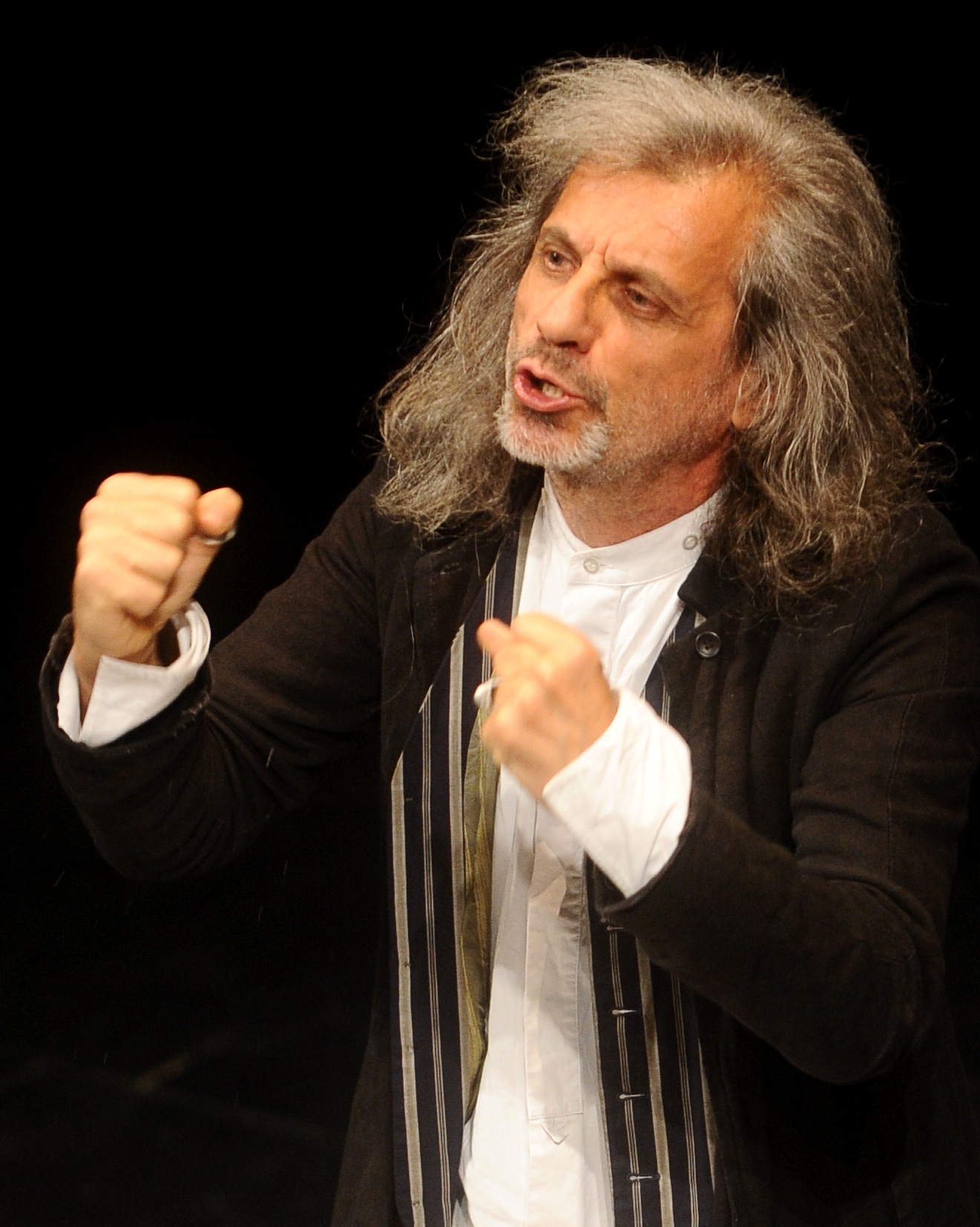
- Bergonzoni in 2015
- Born: July 21, 1958 (age 68); Bologna, Italy
- Occupations: Actor, playwright, comedian, writer, artist
- Years active: 1982–present

Alessandro Bergonzoni (born 21 July 1958) is an Italian actor, playwright, comedian, and writer. Known for his surreal and linguistic style, he has worked extensively in theatre, television, radio, and visual arts, and has published several books. Bergonzoni is regarded as one of the leading figures in Italian experimental comedy and theatre.

== Biography ==
Bergonzoni was born in Bologna on 21 July 1958. He studied at the Accademia Antoniana and graduated in law before beginning his artistic career. In 1982 he debuted with the theatrical show Scemeggiata, which introduced his distinctive style based on absurd humor and linguistic play.

He gained national recognition in 1985 after appearing on the Maurizio Costanzo Show, and in 1986 he participated in the Rai 1 program Il bello della diretta hosted by Loretta Goggi. His stage works often explore surreal and paradoxical situations, rejecting realism as a reference point and focusing on the creative possibilities of language.

== Career ==
Bergonzoni has written and performed more than fifteen theatrical productions, including Madornale 33, Trascendi e sali, and Urge. He has also published several books, among them Le balene restino sedute and Aprimi cielo. His literary style mirrors his stage work, characterized by wordplay and surreal imagery.

In cinema, he appeared in Roberto Benigni's Pinocchio (2002) and Mimmo Paladino's Quijote (2006). He has also contributed regularly to Italian newspapers and magazines, including La Repubblica and Corriere della Sera.

Since 2005, Bergonzoni has expanded into visual arts, presenting installations and exhibitions in Italian museums and galleries. His work often engages with social issues such as illness, coma, and prison life, and he has held public discussions on these topics.

== Awards ==
Bergonzoni has received several honors, including:

- Premio della Critica (2004–2005)
- Premio Hystrio (2008)
- Premio UBU (2009)

== Selected filmography ==
- Pinocchio (2002)
- Quijote (2006)
