= The Little Devil =

1988 Italian comedy film by Roberto Benigni

- Directed by: Roberto Benigni
- Written by: Giuseppe Bertolucci (story); Vincenzo Cerami; Roberto Benigni
- Produced by: Mauro Berardi; Mario Cecchi Gori; Vittorio Cecchi Gori
- Starring: Roberto Benigni; Walter Matthau
- Cinematography: Robby Müller
- Edited by: Nino Baragli
- Music by: Evan Lurie
- Production company: Cecchi Gori Group
- Distributed by: Columbia Tri-Star Films Italia
- Release date: October 14, 1988
- Running time: 110 min.
- Country: Italy
- Languages: Italian and English

The Little Devil (original Italian name Il piccolo diavolo) is a 1988 Italian surreal comedy film directed by and starring Roberto Benigni, also starring Walter Matthau, Stefania Sandrelli, Nicoletta Braschi and John Lurie. The film was produced in two separate language versions: English and Italian.

== Plot ==
In the North American Pontifical College in Rome, Father Maurice is in deep turmoil because of Patricia, a woman who loves him and expects him to make up his mind regarding his intentions toward her. While making an attempt, he is summoned by a novice for an emergency, that of an overweight woman possessed by a demon. Father Maurice performs the rite of exorcism, expelling the demon from the woman.

The demon, an escaped little devil named Giuditta, not wanting to return whence he came, starts following Father Maurice everywhere and often indulges in mischief, sometimes innocently getting Father Maurice into trouble. Father Maurice fails several times to get rid of Giuditta, who, in one instance, replaces an ill Father Maurice at Mass, turning the solemn ceremony into a fashion parade. Seeing that he is showing signs of exhaustion, Father Maurice's peers advise him to take a vacation. Eventually, another agent "from the same place as Giuditta" appears and manages to attract Giuditta, who finally leaves Maurice and follows her "elsewhere".

== Cast ==
- Roberto Benigni as Giuditta, the little devil
- Walter Matthau as Father Maurice
- Nicoletta Braschi as Nina
- Stefania Sandrelli as Patrizia
- John Lurie as Cusatelli
- Paolo Baroni as Saverio
- Franco Fabrizi as Priest
- Annabella Schiavone as Giuditta, the woman

== Reception ==
The film opened in 35 theatres in Italy and its performance led to another 90 prints being made. In its first 24 days, it had grossed $6.8 million in Italy, which Columbia claimed was the best start for an Italian film for 10 years. By December, it had grossed $10 million.

== Awards ==
Roberto Benigni won the David di Donatello Award for Best Actor.
