= Francesco (1989 film) =

- Theatrical release poster
- Directed by: Liliana Cavani
- Screenplay by: Liliana Cavani; Roberta Mazoni
- Produced by: Giulio Scanni
- Starring: Mickey Rourke; Helena Bonham Carter
- Cinematography: Giuseppe Lanci; Ennio Guarnieri
- Edited by: Gabriella Cristiani
- Music by: Vangelis
- Distributed by: Ital-Noleggio Cinematografico
- Release date: April 22, 1989
- Running time: 150 minutes
- Countries: Italy; West Germany
- Languages: English; Italian

Francesco is a 1989 historical drama film about the life of St. Francis of Assisi. It is directed and co-written by Liliana Cavani, and stars Mickey Rourke as Francis and Helena Bonham Carter as the future St. Claire. The screenplay is adapted from Hermann Hesse’s 1904 book Francis of Assisi. Vangelis composed the musical score.

The film won three awards and was nominated for a fourth. Danilo Donati won the 1989 David di Donatello Award for Best Production Design, and the 1989 Italian National Syndicate of Film Journalists Silver Ribbon also for Best Production Design. Fabio Bussotti won the Syndicate's Best Supporting Actor Award. Director Liliana Cavani was nominated for the Golden Palm at the 1989 Cannes Film Festival.

The film is the second of three works by Cavani about St. Francis, preceded by a 1966 telefilm starring Lou Castel in the title role, and a 2014 production with Mateusz Kościukiewicz.

== Plot ==
Through flashbacks, the film charts Francis's evolution from rich man's son to religious humanitarian and finally to full-fledged saint.

Raised as the pampered son of a merchant, Francis goes off to war, only to return with a profound horror for the society which generated such suffering. In one scene, as an act of renunciation, he strips himself of his fine clothing in front of his father, and leaves the house naked and barefoot, joining the lepers and beggars in the poor section of town. A series of episodes from Francis' life follows, rather than a coherent narrative, until his final days when he receives the stigmata, the wounds Christ suffered at the crucifixion.

== Cast ==
- Mickey Rourke as Francesco
- Helena Bonham Carter as Chiara
- Andréa Ferréol as Francesco's Mother (as Andrea Ferreol)
- Nikolaus Dutsch as Cardinal Colonna
- Peter Berling as Bishop Guido
- Hanns Zischler as Pope Innocent III
- Mario Adorf as Cardinal Ugolino
- Paolo Bonacelli as Francesco's Father
- Fabio Bussotti as Leone
- Riccardo De Torrebruna as Pietro Cattani
- Alexander Dubin as Angelo (as Alekander Dubin)
- Edward Farrelly as Egidio
- Paolo Proietti as Pacifico
- Paco Reconti as Rufino
- Diego Ribon as Bernardo di Quintavalle
- Domiziano Arcangeli as Brother in Lateran Palace

== Soundtrack ==
The soundtrack of the film was composed by the Greek composer Vangelis. It was never officially issued, but released in a limited edition not licensed for public use by Andromeda Music (AMO103) in 2002.

== Legacy ==
The film was included by the Vatican in a list of important films compiled in 1995, under the category of "Religion".

== See also ==
- List of historical drama films
