= The Monster (1994 film) =

- Italian theatrical release poster
- Directed by: Roberto Benigni
- Written by: Roberto Benigni; Vincenzo Cerami
- Produced by: Roberto Benigni
- Starring: Roberto Benigni; Nicoletta Braschi; Michel Blanc; Alessandro Calosci
- Cinematography: Carlo Di Palma
- Edited by: Nino Baragli; Franco Fraticelli
- Music by: Evan Lurie
- Distributed by: Filmauro
- Release dates: 22 October 1994 (Italy); 19 April 1996 (U.S.)
- Running time: 112 min.
- Countries: Italy; France
- Languages: Italian; Chinese
- Box office: $24.8 million

The Monster (Italian: Il mostro) is a 1994 Italian comedy film, starring Roberto Benigni as a man who is mistaken by police profilers for a serial killer due to a misunderstanding of the man's strange behavior. This film was, at the time of its release, the highest-grossing film in Italy, bested later by another Benigni film, Life is Beautiful.

== Plot ==
Loris (Roberto Benigni) is a part-time mannequin handler for a department store. He hopes to learn Chinese in order to get an assistant manager position. He lives in a building where he hasn't paid the rent in months, and he also owes money to other people around town.

At a party, Loris is told about a nymphomaniac who will sleep with anyone. Loris approaches the wrong woman, who runs away and tells the police. Because of his odd behavior, he becomes the chief suspect in a series of rape/murders. The chief of police, frustrated by the lack of solid evidence against Loris, resolves to provoke his passion and catch him "red-handed." An attractive police officer, Jessica (Nicoletta Braschi) goes undercover as his roommate, and is directed by the chief and the police doctor, Paride (Michel Blanc), to dress provocatively in order to entrap Loris.

After a few days living in his apartment, Jessica begins to doubt Loris really is the killer. Paride, however, is convinced that Loris is on the brink of committing his next crime. Paride visits Jessica's apartment on the pretext of fitting Loris for a suit. He performs all sorts of medical tests and Loris remains clueless, thinking he really is being fitted for a suit. Later, Loris goes to interview at the Chinese company. His teacher gives him a little Chinese good luck charm, and Jessica sees this. Loris bombs the interview, unable to answer the very first question: to tell his name.

Jessica is about to give up on the case when Paride brings her a Little Red Riding Hood costume and says the chief orders her to put it on. Paride is certain this will unleash Loris' "erotic urges." Jessica does as instructed but Loris remains unmoved. Jessica is back at the police station when they get news that the killer has struck again. At the crime scene, Jessica finds the good luck charm and connects it to Loris' Chinese instructor. She goes to the instructor's house, where she finds both Loris and the teacher. She instructs a uniformed officer to release Loris, then she calmly directs the real killer to a squad car. The film concludes with Loris and Jessica kissing and then walking off into the sunset.

== Cast ==
- Roberto Benigni: Loris
- Nicoletta Braschi: Jessica Rossetti
- Michel Blanc: Dr. Paride Taccone
- Dominique Lavanant: Jolanda, Paride's wife
- Jean-Claude Brialy: Roccarotta
- Ivano Marescotti: Dr. Pascucci
- Laurent Spielvogel: Commissioner Frustalupi
- Franco Mescolini: Chinese teacher
- Massimo Girotti: Resident in Loris' condominium
- Vittorio Amandola: Antiquarian

== Reception ==
The film opened with a record gross of $13.4 million in its opening week in Italy and was number one for three weeks. It went on to gross $23 million in Italy, becoming the highest-grossing film of all time. TV and newspaper film critics in the United States were generally dismissive of this film. On Rotten Tomatoes the film has a 40% rating based on reviews from 10 critics. James Brundage at filmcritic.com writes of this film that "It's childish, it's fun, and you can get it without understanding a single word of Italian... well, maybe not the third part but you still don't have to use your brain all that much."

Chris Hicks of Deseret News was much less impressed by this film: "But after about an hour, Benigni and his film have worn out their welcome — and there's still almost an hour to go." He's surprised that "this movie was a monster hit — the biggest moneymaker in Italian movie history."

Scholars, on the other hand, see the film as an attack on the "conformity" and "compulsory consumption" brought about by Berlusconi’s media society within a discussion of Benigni’s roots in the Commedia dell’arte and a reflection on the often repeated comparison of Benigni with Buster Keaton." Benigni has also been compared to Charlie Chaplin, with the ending of The Monster being compared to the ending of Modern Times.

== Remake ==
In August 1998, it was announced Spyglass Entertainment had begun development on a remake of the film but this never came to pass.

Kyaa Kool Hain Hum, 2005 Bollywood Movie is remake of The Monster.

Sutta Pazham, 2008 Tamil movie is also a remake of this movie.
