= Tu mi turbi =

- Directed by: Roberto Benigni
- Written by: Roberto Benigni; Giuseppe Bertolucci
- Produced by: Ettore Rosboch
- Starring: Roberto Benigni, Nicoletta Braschi, Claudio Bigagli
- Cinematography: Luigi Verga
- Edited by: Gabriella Cristiani
- Music by: Paolo Conte
- Distributed by: Mario Cecchi Gori & Vittorio Cecchi Gori
- Release date: 1983
- Running time: 85 minutes
- Country: Italy
- Language: Italian

Tu mi turbi (also known as You Upset Me and You Disturb Me) is a 1983 Italian anthology comedy film written, directed and starred by Roberto Benigni. It is both the directorial debut of Benigni and the film debut of Nicoletta Braschi.

== Plot summary ==
The film is divided into four episodes. In the first of these, the pastor Benigno is called by Mary of Nazareth and Joseph to take care of the newborn baby Jesus, who proves to be a brat. He performs a spiteful miracle series, including that of floating in the tub where he has to swim. Benigno confesses to the baby to being hopelessly in love with Mary, but he has to resign, because the Madonna has now taken a husband.

The tramp Benigno desperately searches for his beloved angel of heaven named Angela. When he gets information from other angels about the pure soul, Benigno discovers that she is in love with God, and that the two are getting married.

The unemployed Benigno visits the bank in hopes of securing a loan for purchasing a home. Directed by the bank manager, Benigno embarks on a journey filled with comical misunderstandings due to his lack of understanding about the intricacies of bank lending. Eventually, the manager's patience wears thin, leaving him exasperated and demanding Benigno's imprisonment.

The two soldiers Benigno and Claudio are doing the night guard in Rome, at the Altar of the Fatherland, the tomb of the Unknown Soldier. The two begin chatting about communists, and after some reasoning about death in war, Benigno demonstrates with great wonder that God exists.

== Cast ==
- Roberto Benigni: Benigno
- Olimpia Carlisi: Angela
- Claudio Bigagli: soldier
- Nicoletta Braschi: Mary
- Carlo Monni: Joseph
- Giacomo Piperno: bank manager Diotaiuti
- Serena Grandi
- Mariangela D'Abbraccio
