= Especially on Sunday =

- DVD cover
- Directed by: Giuseppe Tornatore; Marco Tullio Giordana; Giuseppe Bertolucci; Francesco Barilli
- Written by: Tonino Guerra
- Starring: Philippe Noiret; Ornella Muti; Bruno Ganz; Jean-Hugues Anglade; Chiara Caselli; Nicoletta Braschi; M. M. Fellini
- Music by: Ennio Morricone; Andrea Guerra
- Production companies: Basic Cinematografica; Titanus; Paradis Films; Rai Due; Intermédias
- Distributed by: Miramax (USA); BAC Films (France); Dusk Motion Pictures (Belgium)
- Release dates: 26 September 1991 (Italy); 13 August 1993 (United States)
- Country: Italy
- Language: Italian
- Box office: 540.000

La domenica specialmente (internationally released as Especially on Sunday) is a 1991 Italian comedy-drama film. It consists of four segments, all written by Tonino Guerra. Each segment has a different director: Giuseppe Tornatore, Marco Tullio Giordana, Giuseppe Bertolucci and Francesco Barilli.

== Cast ==
=== La neve sul fuoco ===
- Maddalena Fellini as Caterina
- Chiara Caselli as the spouse
- Andrea Prodan as Marco
- Ivano Marescotti as Don Vincenzo

(directed by Marco Tullio Giordana)

=== Il cane blu ===
- Philippe Noiret as Amleto
- Nicola Di Pinto as pastore

(directed by Giuseppe Tornatore)

=== La domenica specialmente ===
- Bruno Ganz as Vittorio
- Ornella Muti as Anna
- Nicoletta Braschi as Nicoletta

(directed by Giuseppe Bertolucci)

=== Le chiese di legno ===
- Jean-Hugues Anglade as Biker birds
- Sergio Bini Bustric

(directed by Francesco Barilli)
