= Who Killed Pasolini? =

- Theatrical release poster
- Directed by: Marco Tullio Giordana
- Written by: Enzo Siciliano (novel); Marco Tullio Giordana
- Produced by: Vittorio Cecchi Gori; Rita Rusic
- Starring: Claudio Amendola; Carlo De Filippi; Nicoletta Braschi
- Cinematography: Franco Lecca
- Edited by: Cecilia Zanuso
- Music by: Ennio Morricone
- Distributed by: Variety Distribution
- Release date: 1995
- Running time: 100 minutes
- Countries: Italy; France
- Language: Italian

Pasolini, un delitto italiano (Pasolini, an Italian Crime), internationally released as Who Killed Pasolini?, is a 1995 Italian crime-drama film co-written and directed by Marco Tullio Giordana. It was released on 3 July 1996. It depicts the trial against Pino Pelosi, who was charged with the murder of artist and filmmaker Pier Paolo Pasolini.

The film entered the competition at the 52nd Venice International Film Festival, in which Giordana won the President of the Italian Senate's gold medal. The film also won the David di Donatello for best editing.

== Plot synopsis ==
The film traces the last hours of the life of poet and film director Pier Paolo Pasolini and his murder in 1975 on the beach at Ostia, near Rome. A boy, Pino Pelosi, is arrested and charged with murder. The police and judges believe that Pelosi is the only murderer of Pasolini, but the injuries on the body of the poet appear to be too severe and profound for Pelosi to have achieved alone.

As the trial unfolds, the film also examines the personality of Pasolini, his body of work and, above all, explains what people think of him in Italy. According to some Italians, Pasolini was a provocative man who "deserved what he suffered" (his murder) as punishment for being a Communist and a homosexual. Alternatively, his friends and fellow intellectuals remember him as a very good and sensible man, who sought only to fight against neo-fascism and the cruel and bigoted mentality prevailing in the Occidental world, particularly in the bourgeois and middle-class society.

== Cast ==
- Carlo De Filippi: Pino Pelosi
- Giulio Scarpati: Nino Marazzita
- Antonello Fassari: Rocco Mangia
- Claudio Bigagli: Guido Calvi
- Andrea Occhipinti: Furio Colombo
- Nicoletta Braschi: Graziella Chiarcossi
- Massimo De Francovich: Faustino Durante
- Victor Cavallo: Antonio Pelosi
- Rosa Pianeta: Maria Pelosi
- Antonio Petrocelli: Tommaso Spaltro
- Ivano Marescotti: a customer of Spaltro
- Claudio Amendola: "Trepalle"
- Enzo Marcelli: Braciola
- Simone Melis: Bracioletta
- Adriana Asti: teacher
- Toni Bertorelli: inspector Pigna
- Francesco Siciliano: journalist
- Pier Paolo Pasolini (archival footage)
- Ninetto Davoli (archival footage)
