= Down by Law (film) =

1986 film by Jim Jarmusch

- Promotional poster
- Directed by: Jim Jarmusch
- Written by: Jim Jarmusch
- Produced by: Alan Kleinberg
- Starring: Tom Waits; John Lurie; Roberto Benigni; Nicoletta Braschi; Ellen Barkin
- Cinematography: Robby Müller
- Edited by: Melody London
- Music by: John Lurie
- Production company: Black Snake
- Distributed by: Island Pictures
- Release date: September 20, 1986 (Limited)
- Running time: 107 minutes
- Country: United States
- Languages: English; Italian
- Budget: $1,030,000
- Box office: $1,435,668

Down by Law (Italian: Daunbailò) is a 1986 American independent Southern Gothic neo-beat noir comedy film. It was written and directed by Jim Jarmusch, and stars the American musicians Tom Waits and John Lurie, as well as the Italian comedian Roberto Benigni in his first American film.

The film centers on the arrest, incarceration, and escape from jail of three men. It discards jailbreak film conventions by focusing on the interaction between the convicts rather than on the mechanics of the escape. A key element in the film is Robby Müller's slow-moving camerawork, which captures the architecture of New Orleans and the Louisiana bayou to which the cellmates escape.

== Plot ==
In New Orleans, radio disc jockey Zack lives with his girlfriend Laurette. After an argument, she throws him out of their apartment. Later, an acquaintance offers Zack money to drive a car across town. Zack accepts and is subsequently arrested when police discover a corpse in the vehicle’s trunk.

Meanwhile, small-time pimp Jack is set up by a rival. He is sent to a hotel room to meet a prospective prostitute, only to discover that the girl is underage. Police immediately arrest him in a sting operation.

After their convictions, Zack and Jack become cellmates in a Louisiana prison. The two men clash constantly and spend much of their time arguing. Their routine is interrupted by the arrival of Bob, an Italian immigrant imprisoned after he killed a man with a billiard ball, thrown in return fire at his attackers after he was caught cheating at cards. Bob’s cheerful disposition and fractured English initially annoy Zack and Jack, though they gradually warm up to him.

After several months in prison, Bob reveals that he’s discovered a way out. The three men escape into the storm sewer system and emerge outside the prison walls. They flee into the Louisiana bayou and wander through swamps and marshland for several days.

Lost, they struggle to find food and determine their location. Growing frustrated with one another and their inability to navigate the wilderness, Zack and Jack decide to part ways. Bob pleads with them to stay, having just caught a rabbit for dinner. Zack and Jack eventually return to Bob's camp and he shares the roasted rabbit with them.

The escapees come across a remote roadside restaurant called Luigi's Tin Top. Zack and Jack convince Bob to enter while they wait outside. When they finally enter, they find him conversing in Italian with Nicoletta, an Italian immigrant who inherited the restaurant from her late uncle. Bob professes his love for Nicoletta as she welcomes the two other men inside, feeds them, and gives the men clothing that had belonged to her uncle. Bob and Nicoletta become inseparable over dinner. Realizing that his future now lies with her rather than with his fellow escapees, Bob accepts Nicoletta's offer to stay.

The following morning, Zack and Jack prepare to continue their journey. Bob bids farewell to Zack and Jack and remains behind with Nicoletta at the restaurant. Zack and Jack walk together until they reach a fork in the road. The two men part ways without hostility, Zack taking the road to the right and Jack the one to the left.

== Cast ==
- Tom Waits as Zack
- John Lurie as Jack
- Roberto Benigni as Roberto (aka "Bob")
- Nicoletta Braschi as Nicoletta
- Ellen Barkin as Laurette
- Billie Neal as Bobbie
- Rockets Redglare as Gig
- Vernel Bagneris as Preston
- Timothea as Julie
- L.C. Drane as L.C.
- Joy N. Houck, Jr. as Detective Mandino
- Carrie Lindsoe as Young Girl
- Ralph Joseph as Detective
- Richard Boes as Detective
- Dave Petitjean as Cajun Detective

== Production ==
Jarmusch first met the musicians John Lurie and Tom Waits in Manhattan at a birthday party for Jean-Michel Basquiat. They became close friends, and Jarmusch began to write a screenplay with them in mind. He set it in New Orleans because the city intrigued him for its unique culture and its foundational position in the development of American music, especially jazz. Jarmusch befriended the Italian actor and stand-up comedian Roberto Benigni in Italy when both of them were serving as jurors at a film festival. They communicated in broken French because neither one could speak the other's native language. Jarmusch adapted his screenplay to include Benigni.

The title Down by Law is an expression that attracted Jarmusch because it has a contradictory double meaning: it may indicate oppression from the law, and in 1920s American street slang it may indicate a trust or brotherhood shared between oppressed persons such as African Americans or prisoners.

Jarmusch sought independent funding for the project through Alan Kleinberg who had recently collaborated with Jarmusch on the music video for the Talking Heads song "The Lady Don’t Mind", from their 1985 album Little Creatures. Kleinberg said he would support Jarmusch's next film even before it was written. Island Pictures backed the film without imposing artistic limitations on Jarmusch.

Jarmusch assembled a cast and crew of 25 who stayed in New Orleans for one or two months to work on the film; in 2002 he recalled them as a tight-knit "pirate" crew without craft boundaries, able to quickly solve every problem. Production began in mid-November 1985, with principal photography starting on December 5 and completed by the end of the month. Post-production work continued into January 1986. The total cost for the film was $1.03 million.

The cinematography was by Robby Müller, who subsequently worked with Jarmusch on Mystery Train (1989), Dead Man (1995), and Ghost Dog: The Way of the Samurai (1999). Like many of Jarmusch's films, the film was shot in black-and-white for its greater contrast, and to spur the imagination of the viewer who would not be receiving color cues.

Scenes were shot in various neighborhoods of New Orleans, inside Orleans Parish Prison (OPP), and in a bayou across Lake Pontchartrain. The actor Paul Reubens, known for his character Pee-wee Herman, happened upon the crew filming late one night on an otherwise deserted street corner. Many of the scenic traveling shots were unplanned, shot "guerilla"-style as inspiration hit Müller or Jarmusch. But Jarmusch decided to prepare his actors for the prison scenes by having them briefly incarcerated in OPP—Waits and Lurie processed and placed in one cell, Jarmusch and Benigni in another. The prison guards and other inmates were unaware that these four men would be let out in four hours by prior arrangement with the warden. Jarmusch said in 2002 that the heavy experience was useful for Waits and Lurie, but Benigni was unaffected, remaining upbeat the whole time.

Benigni and Nicoletta Braschi, whose characters fall in love in the movie, got married in 1991. They had already known each other from film school in Rome, and Benigni cast her in his 1983 film Tu mi turbi.

== Release and reviews ==
The film was first shown publicly on September 19, 1986, at the New York Film Festival. A limited theatrical release followed immediately, and on October 3 the film gained a wider release, starting in Los Angeles. Down by Law was entered into the 1986 Cannes Film Festival. Its title in Italian was the phonetic spelling, Daunbailò. It was dedicated to Pascale Ogier and Enzo Ungari.

Vincent Canby for The New York Times called it a "fable of poetic density", with "extraordinary performances" by the three main actors. Roger Ebert of The Chicago Sun-Times gave the film three stars out of a possible four. He said Down By Law was overlong, but with an undercurrent of sly humor that balanced out the grim material; a "true original that kind of grows on you", and "an anthology of pulp images from the world of film noir." The Chicago Tribune gave the film a negative review, saying that Jarmusch was "imitating himself": the characters Zack and Jack appearing similar to each other was a copy of Jarmusch's previous film Stranger than Paradise which had the same pattern showing between the characters Bela and Eddie. On a positive note, the reviewer praised Jarmusch's "distinctive visual style" and Müller's "seductive" camera work.

The film has an 85% approval rating on Rotten Tomatoes, based on 33 reviews, with an average rating of 8/10. The website's consensus reads: "Funny, original, and thoroughly cinematic, Down by Law represents writer-director Jim Jarmusch at his most ingratiating and evocative." On Metacritic, the film has a weighted average score of 75 out of 100 based on 20 critics, which the site labels as "generally favorable" reviews.

In 2002, the film was digitally transferred by The Criterion Collection in a high-definition 16:9 widescreen format and re-released on DVD and Blu-Ray. The package included two discs carrying many extra features such as outtakes, a 1986 press conference at Cannes, a 1986 video interview of Lurie, a newly written review by the film critic Lucy Sante, three phone conversations between Jarmusch and his three main stars in 2002, Dutch cinematographer Robby Müller in 2002 talking about the filming process, and a music video shot in Los Angeles in 1990 by Jarmusch of Waits covering the Cole Porter song "It's All Right with Me" for the Red Hot + Blue compilation.

== Soundtrack ==
The score was written and performed by John Lurie, backed with a small jazz ensemble, released on vinyl by Crammed Discs.

=== Songs ===
- "Crying", written by Roy Orbison and Joe Melson, first lines performed by Tom Waits alone in a car as he imagines deejaying, just before he is stopped by police.
- "Jockey Full of Bourbon", written and performed by Tom Waits (from the album Rain Dogs, 1985), the whole song plays over otherwise soundless tracking shots of New Orleans neighborhood streets.
- "It's Raining", performed by Irma Thomas. In the breakfast scene Bob chooses the song from a juke box and dances to it with Nicoletta.
- "Tango Till They're Sore", written and performed by Tom Waits (from Rain Dogs), final song.

== See also ==
- List of American films of 1986
