= Ivano Marescotti =

Italian actor (1946–2023)

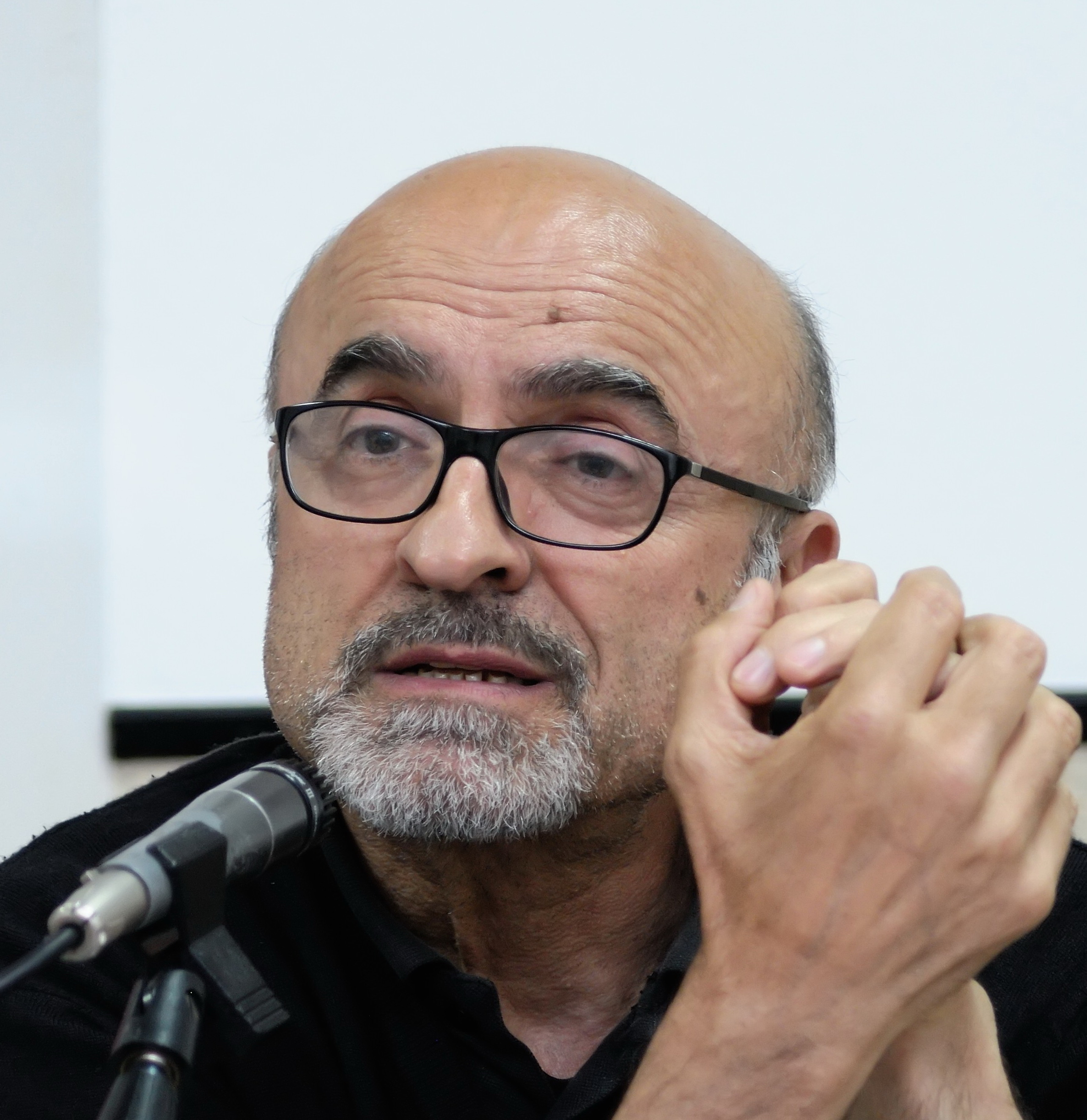
- Marescotti in 2014
- Born: 4 February 1946; Villanova di Bagnacavallo, Italy
- Died: 26 March 2023 (aged 77); Ravenna, Italy
- Occupation(s): Actor, theater director
- Height: 1.78 m (5 ft 10 in)

Ivano Marescotti (4 February 1946 – 26 March 2023) was an Italian actor and theatre director.

== Life and career ==
Born in Villanova di Bagnacavallo, province of Ravenna, Marescotti worked as a clerk in the urban sector of the Councillorship of Ravenna. He began acting at 35 years old, first in local amateur stage works, then in some major stage companies.

After acting in small film roles, Marescotti had his breakout role in 1991 as Tobia the chemist in Silvio Soldini's comedy film The Peaceful Air of the West. From then Marescotti started appearing in dozens of films, usually in supporting roles, establishing himself as one of the most active character actors in the Italian cinema of the 1990s and 2000s. In recent years, he took part in several international productions.

In 2004 he won a Silver Ribbon for the short film Assicurazione sulla vita. In 2007 he was elected to the regional constituent assembly of the Democratic Party in Bologna.

Marescotti died in Ravenna on 26 March 2023 after a three-year battle with prostate cancer, at the age of 77.

== Selected filmography ==
- The Belt (1989)
- The Peaceful Air of the West (1990)
- Especially on Sunday (1991)
- Johnny Stecchino (1991)
- The Invisible Wall (1991)
- Gangsters (1992)
- Benito (1993)
- The Long Silence (1993)
- The Monster (1994)
- Declarations of Love (1994)
- Mario and the Magician (1994)
- Weird Tales (1994)
- Who Killed Pasolini? (1995)
- Luna e l'altra (1996)
- Vesna Goes Fast (1996)
- Jack Frusciante Left the Band (1996)
- Bits and Pieces (1996)
- Commercial Break (1997)
- The Talented Mr. Ripley (1999)
- Holy Tongue (2000)
- 20 - Venti (2000)
- Brazilero (2001)
- Hannibal (2001)
- The Legend of Al, John and Jack (2002)
- King Arthur (2004)
- The Wind, in the Evening (2004)
- Raccontami (2006)
- Il Pirata: Marco Pantani (2007)
- The Right Distance (2007)
- Lessons in Chocolate (2007)
- Clare and Francis (2007)
- Fort Apache Napoli (2009)
- Cado dalle nubi (2009)
- What a Beautiful Day (2011)
- The Perfect Life (2011)
- Vacanze di Natale a Cortina (2011)
- A Good Season (2014)
- Them Who? (2015)
- There's No Place Like Home (2018)
