= Seeking Asylum (film) =

1979 film

- Film poster
- Directed by: Marco Ferreri
- Written by: Roberto Benigni; Gérard Brach; Marco Ferreri
- Produced by: Jacqueline Ferreri; Renzo Rossellini
- Starring: Roberto Benigni
- Cinematography: Pasquale Rachini
- Edited by: Mauro Bonanni
- Music by: Philippe Sarde
- Release date: 24 October 1979
- Running time: 110 minutes
- Country: Italy
- Language: Italian

Seeking Asylum (Italian: Chiedo asilo) is a 1979 Italian comedy film directed by Marco Ferreri and starring Roberto Benigni as Roberto, a kindergarten teacher who uses unusual teaching methods to form special bonds with his students. It was entered into the 30th Berlin International Film Festival where it won the Silver Bear - Special Jury Prize.

== Plot ==
For the first time in a kindergarten in the Corticella district of Bologna, a male teacher starts working. Roberto is an excellent educator who immediately establishes a great rapport with the children, as well as with his female colleagues. However, his educational methods, which are rather unconventional and inspired by a great sense of freedom, will lead him to encounter some problems with the authorities.

Roberto starts a relationship with Isabella, the single mother of his student Michela, and the woman finds herself pregnant once again. He also forms a special friendship with Gianluigi, a child with behavioral issues who doesn't speak and eats very little, and because of this, he is removed from the kindergarten and placed in a care home. The following summer, Isabella, close to giving birth, expresses her intention to move to Sardinia, where she owns an abandoned cinema. Roberto, although not explicitly invited to join her, accompanies her along with a group of children, including Gianluigi. On the very day that Isabella gives birth to her second child, Gianluigi begins to show the first real signs of recovery.

== Cast ==
- Roberto Benigni as Roberto
- Francesca De Sapio as Chiara
- Dominique Laffin as Isabella
- Luca Levi as Luca
- Girolamo Marzano as Mario
- Carlo Monni as Paolo
- Chiara Moretti as Irma
- Roberto Amaro as Robertino
