= Pinocchio (2002 film) =

2002 film by Roberto Benigni

- Theatrical release poster
- Directed by: Roberto Benigni
- Screenplay by: Vincenzo Cerami; Roberto Benigni
- Based on: The Adventures of Pinocchio by Carlo Collodi
- Produced by: Gianluigi Braschi; Elda Ferri; Nicoletta Braschi
- Starring: Roberto Benigni; Nicoletta Braschi; Mino Bellei; Carlo Giuffrè; Peppe Barra; Franco Javarone; Max Cavallari; Bruno Arena; Corrado Pani; Kim Rossi Stuart; Luis Molteni; Alessandro Bergonzoni
- Cinematography: Dante Spinotti
- Edited by: Simona Paggi
- Music by: Nicola Piovani
- Production companies: Melampo Cinematografica; Cecchi Gori Group
- Distributed by: Medusa Distribuzione (Italy); Miramax Films (International)
- Release date: 11 October 2002 (Italy)
- Running time: 108 minutes (original); 100 minutes (US version)
- Country: Italy
- Language: Italian
- Budget: $40–45 million
- Box office: $41.3 million

Pinocchio is a 2002 Italian fantasy comedy-drama film co-written and directed by Roberto Benigni, who also stars. It is based on the 1883 novel The Adventures of Pinocchio by Carlo Collodi, with Benigni portraying Pinocchio. Filming took place in Italy and Kalkara, Malta. It was dedicated to costume and production designer Danilo Donati, who died on 1 December 2001.

The film was released in Italy on 11 October 2002 by Medusa Distribuzione and met with mixed reviews. It received an English-language dub in the United States, released by Miramax Films in 25 December 2002, which was critically panned. While it became one of the highest-grossing films in Italy, it underperformed internationally, grossing $41.3 million against a production budget of $40‒45 million. It was selected as the Italian entry for the Best Foreign Language Film at the 75th Academy Awards, but it was not nominated.

== Plot ==
A magical log falls off a wagon, stopping at Geppetto's door. The wood carver creates a puppet from the log and names it Pinocchio. Pinocchio comes to life and runs away in the streets, turning the town upside down. The carpenter is blamed and taken to prison by the Carabinieri, while Pinocchio escapes.

Back home, a talking cricket scolds him for his behavior; this annoys Pinocchio, so he tries to hit him with a hammer. Tired and hungry, Pinocchio promises to his father that he will go to school and study. Geppetto returns home from prison and sold his only coat to buy schoolbooks for him. However, the naughty puppet goes on several adventures, dreading school.

Joining a puppet theater, Pinocchio is almost eaten by the giant puppet master Mangiafuoco. Lying to get out of the situation, he is given five gold coins. He then meets The Fox and the Cat, who trick him out of his money, telling him to plant it to grow a 'money tree' in the Miracle Meadow near the town of "Grab-A-Dimwit". A Blue Fairy encourages Pinocchio to give up his obnoxious ways and saves him from being hanged. After being examined by the Owl, the Crow, and the Talking Cricket, Pinocchio experiences the side effect of his lying. The Blue Fairy gives Pinocchio medicine; as he refuses it coffin-bearing rabbits appear, so he immediately takes it afterwards.

The Fox and Cat steal the gold coins Pinocchio buried. The Talking Cricket informs Pinocchio about it. Pinocchio tells the judges about the Fox and Cat's theft, but was sentenced to five years in jail for foolishness. While there, Pinocchio meets Lucignolo, a thief that stole 29 lollipops from a candy shop (although the judges are shown eating them) who is being released. Four months later, during the celebration of the King's son's birth, Pinocchio is set free. He stumbles across the grave of the Blue Fairy, who supposedly died of grief because of his antics.

A dove tells Pinocchio that his father was heading out to sea to look for him. Pinocchio arrives at the shore, finding Geppetto on his ship and been knocked out by the waves. Pinocchio nearly drowns trying to save his father, then washes up by a city where he meets the Blue Fairy again.

On his way to school, a kid throws a book at him; he ducks and the book hits Eugenio, who loses consciousness. Pinocchio is blamed for the crime. Upon nearing the Blue Fairy's house he escapes, ending up in a grape farmer's trap. Pinocchio is freed by Lucignolo and returns to the Blue Fairy's home.

The next day, Lucignolo convinces Pinocchio to join him on a trip to 'Fun Forever Land'. When there, the Cricket tries to warn them all they will turn into donkeys if they do not leave and continue being bad. Pinocchio soon becomes a donkey and is sold to a circus ringmaster.

During his performance, Pinocchio gets hurt and is thrown into the sea, where he instantly returns to normal and is swallowed by a giant shark which coincidentally has also swallowed Geppetto. They escape together.

Pinocchio takes Geppetto to a farm to help him recover by helping out a farmer to get his father better. Inside the farmer's paddock, he sees a sick donkey who he immediately recognizes as Lucignolo, but his friend tragically dies from working too hard.

Rewarding his efforts to strive for moral prudence, the Blue Fairy transforms him into a real boy. With his wish granted, he and his father see his old puppet body in the corner of the house, and he sets off his actual first day of school.

== Cast ==
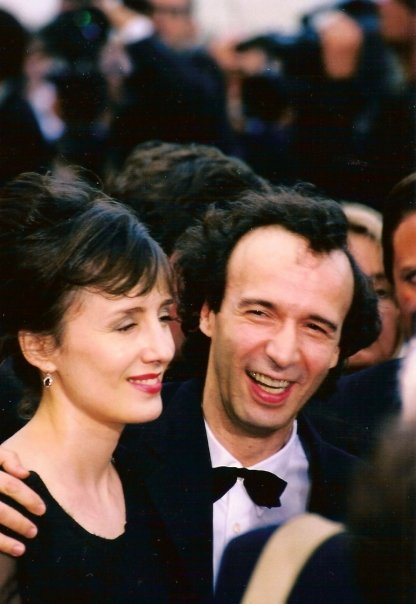
Roberto Benigni and his wife Nicoletta Braschi starred as Pinocchio and the Blue Fairy respectively. Aside from playing the title character, Benigni also served as the film's director and co-writer.

Character	Original Italian actor	English dubbing actor
Pinocchio	Roberto Benigni	Breckin Meyer
Blue Fairy	Nicoletta Braschi	Glenn Close
Medoro	Mino Bellei	Eric Idle
Geppetto	Carlo Giuffrè	David Suchet
Talking Cricket	Peppe Barra	John Cleese
Mangiafuoco	Franco Javarone	Kevin James
The Cat	Max Cavallari	Eddie Griffin
The Fox	Bruno Arena	Cheech Marin
Gorilla Judge	Corrado Pani	David Suchet
Lucignolo / Leonardo	Kim Rossi Stuart	Topher Grace
Dove	N/A	Queen Latifah
Coachman	Luis Molteni	Erik Bergmann
Ringmaster	Alessandro Bergonzoni	Regis Philbin
Giangio / Farmer George	Andrea Nardi	Jim Belushi
Carabiniere #1	Alfredo Cavazzoni	David Coburn
Carabiniere #2	Vincenzo Bonanno	Rufus Collins
Carabiniere #3	Marco Tullio Cao	David Coburn
Carabiniere #4	Michele Mazzanti	Rufus Collins
Green Grocer	Claudio Bellante	N/A
Vintner	Massimo Bianchi	N/A
Furcoat Man	Giuliano Ghiselli	Ray Iannicelli
Street Vendor	Fausto Marchini	N/A
Student	Valerio Ceccarelli	Matthew Labyorteaux
Pulcinella	Tommaso Bianco	Tom Amundson
Mrs. Rosaura	Silvia Floridi	N/A
Pantalone	Franco Mescolini	Bob Papenbrook
Harlequin	Stefano Onofri	Tony Abatemarco
Innkeeper of the Gambero Rosso	Giorgio Ariani	Harry Murphy
First Doctor	Donato Castellaneta	Steve Bulen
Second Doctor	Lamberto Consani	Nicholas Guest
Undertaker Rabbit	N/A	David Coburn
Judge #2	Giovanni Febraro	N/A
Jailer	Camillo Grassi	David Coburn
Fisherman	Luigi Delli	Stephen Mellor
Lady with Pitchers	Paola Braschi de Giovanni	Nicole Orth-Pallavicini
Eugenio	Riccardo Bizzarri	Stephen Apostolina
Appuntato	Giacomo Gonnella	N/A
Gendarmerie #1	Totò Onnis	N/A
Gendarmerie #2	Danilo Nigrelli	N/A
Brigadier	Dario Magi	N/A
Melampo's Owner	Sandro Dori	Peter Gerety
Schoolmaster	Remo Masini	N/A
Boy #1	Giorgio Noè	N/A
Boy #2	Mario Orfei	N/A
Boy #3	Dodo Otrecolli	N/A
Boy #4	Francesco Guzzo	N/A
Boy #5	Max Galligani	N/A
Boy #6	Stefano Scandaletti	N/A
Man with the Mustache	Vincenzo Cerami	Peter Gerety
Man with Fur	Franco Casaglieri	N/A
Boy	Giorgio Fabbio	N/A
Boy	Michele Manuzzi	N/A

== Production ==
According to Benigni, the project for a film in which the actor played Pinocchio began with Federico Fellini. The project dates back to the time of The Voice of the Moon (1990), in which Benigni starred and which was Fellini's last film before his death in 1993. On that occasion, in fact, Fellini called Benigni and his co-star Paolo Villaggio "Collodian characters". Benigni also said that, on that occasion, some test scenes were shot that were never shown to the public and that Vincenzo Cerami had begun writing a screenplay. Benigni recalled, "We prepared. We shot film. He called me Pinocchio. Every year, he was telling me, 'Roberto, next year we make Pinocchio.' But he wanted to release Pinocchio as a nightmare because the classic story is very cruel. And I was telling him, 'Federico, it is also a story full of life and joy, also grief and sorrow.' And he said, 'No, no, it's a nightmare!' [...] When he was very sick, I went to find him in the hospital, and I said, 'Federico, come up, don't be sick because we will make Pinocchio.' And he said to me, 'You will do Pinocchio, Roberto.' That was his last phrase to me."

The film was shot at the Cinecittà Umbria Studios in Papigno, a frazione of Terni.

The film took 28 weeks of shooting, 8 months of pre-production, and 8 months of post-production.

In 2000, director Enzo D'Alò was supposed to release his animated version of Pinocchio, but due to the production of Benigni's film, it was postponed until 2012. In D'Alò's version, there was supposed to be a scene similar to Benigni's film, in which a log fell from a carriage.

== Release ==
To promote the film's release, McDonald's sold Happy Meals containing toys that each resembled a character of the film.

In the United States and Canada, Miramax released the film on Christmas Day with no advance screening. Miramax said that this is because they needed to do post-production looping to insert the English dub for its English-speaking release. Edward Guthmann, a film reviewer for the San Francisco Chronicle, thought that this was because Miramax knew the film would not be well-received, and sought to have it released before critics gave their opinions on the film. The English version includes some differences, such as changed dialogue, various shortened scenes, and added narration by David Suchet. After the English dubbed version was poorly received, Miramax reissued the film in Italian with English subtitles on 7 February 2003.

In Italy the first airing on free TV was on Canale 5 on 4 January 2004. It was watched by 4,502,000 people, with an audience share of 19.02%.

== Reception ==
=== Box-office ===
In Italy and Europe, Pinocchio grossed over $7 million within the first three days of its release. It went on to gross $3.67 million in the United States, and $37.7 million in other territories (of which €26 million was in Italy), for a worldwide total of $41.3 million, against a production budget of $40 million.

=== Critical response ===
==== Original version ====
Pinocchio received mixed reviews. David Rooney of Variety wrote, "In Roberto Benigni's take on Carlo Collodi's classic fairy tale, Pinocchio, the spirit of the late Federico Fellini—with whom Benigni talked of doing the project together—surfaces repeatedly. But that spirit fails to enliven a film substantially lacking in personality, energy, magic and humor ... The union between the Tuscan fairy tale and the region's most talented contemporary offspring would seem like the perfect marriage. In fact, it comes off as artificially exuberant and a little precious." Roberto Nepoti of La Repubblica stated, "The film is a kind of linear translation of the book, illustrated by the splendid scenographies of Danilo Donati, played by good actors, accompanied by special effects of excellent levels but where, unfortunately, something is missing. What is missing is a visionary fantasy, a sense of excess, of the poetry that belongs to Benigni as an actor and author, but which Benigni as director has not yet acquired."

Pinocchio went on to receive six nominations at the David di Donatello Awards, winning two in the process: Best Production Design and Best Costumes, both to Danilo Donati. It also received three nominations at the Nastri d'Argento Awards, winning in the Best Score category.

Director Jim Jarmusch, who had previously directed Benigni in two films, said that, "I saw it in both the American and the Italian versions. Miramax killed the film by dubbing it badly and stripping it of the dark tones Roberto cared about, fearing it wouldn't appeal to American children. It's a poetic film, his, and the image of the carriage pulled by the little mice remains unforgettable."

Actor Robert Downey Jr. called Pinocchio "A wonderful film, with ideas and inventions that worked from many points of view. I think Benigni was able to interpret it with his unique style. But what makes Pinocchio timeless is precisely its ability to be told in a thousand different ways." He didn't specify if he watched the subtitled or dubbed version.

==== American version ====
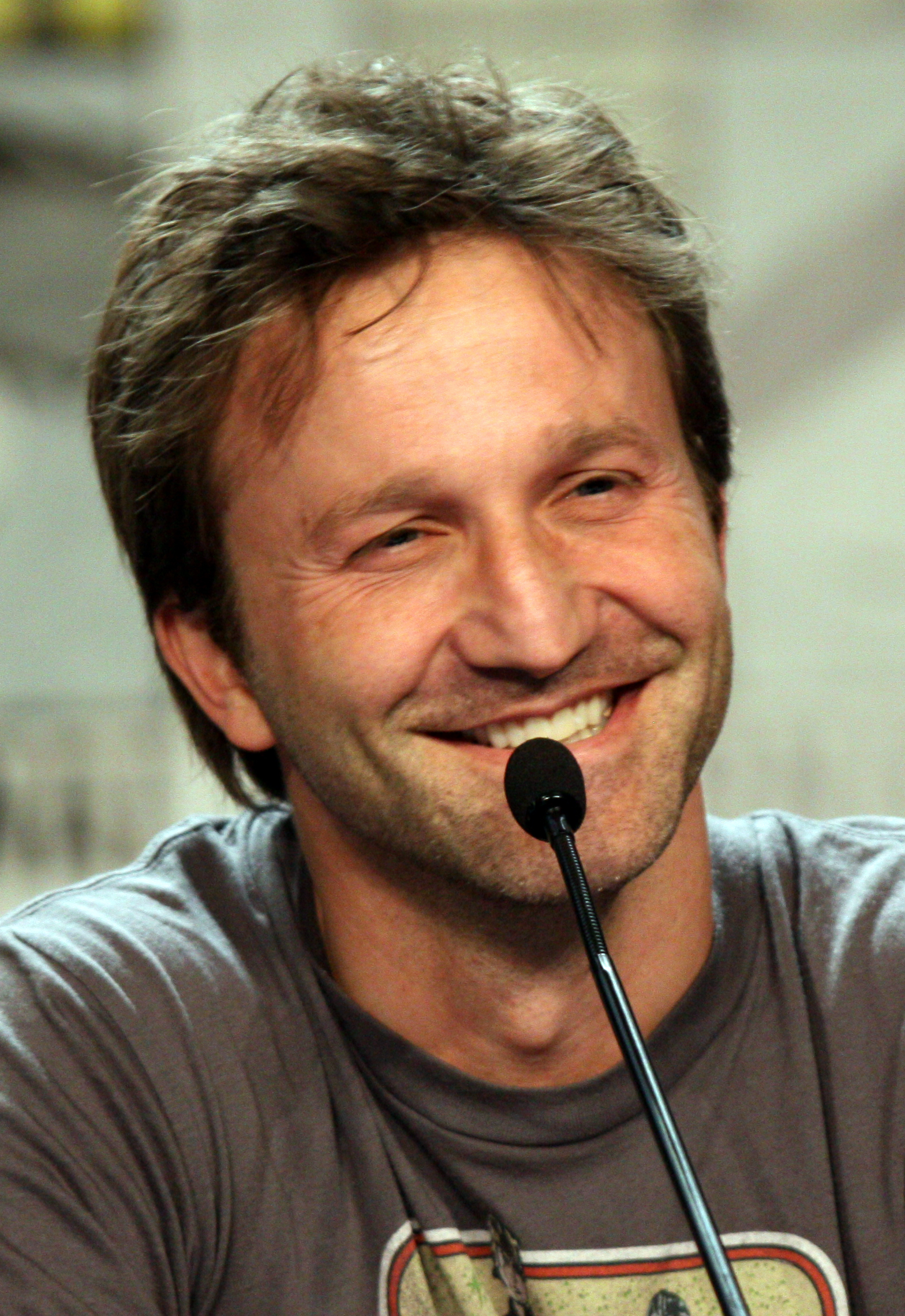
The English dub of the movie was heavily criticized, including Breckin Meyer's performance as the title character.

The English-dubbed recut version by Miramax was met with critical panning in the United States. On the review aggregator website Rotten Tomatoes, 0% of 53 critics' reviews are positive, with an average rating of 2.8/10. The website's consensus reads: "Roberto Benigni misfires wildly with this adaptation of Pinocchio, and the result is an unfunny, poorly-made, creepy vanity project." Metacritic, which uses a weighted average, assigned the film a score of 11 out of 100, based on 15 critics, indicating "overwhelming dislike". Jonathan Rosenbaum stated on Chicago Reader that "the recut American version is truly awful, but a good 75% of the awfulness is attributable to Miramax". Audiences polled by CinemaScore gave the film an average grade of "D+" on an A+ to F scale. Peter Howell of The Toronto Star wrote that, "while there's no question that Benigni has the stamina and comic timing to play a mischievous child, even his considerable charisma cannot conceal the fact that he's a 50-year-old man in a red-and-white Harlequin suit, running around frantically pretending to be a boy. Braschi is utterly charmless as the Blue Fairy, despite making her entrance in a Cinderella carriage pulled by oversized white mice, one of the movies few visual feats."

Amongst other issues, the English dub was heavily criticized, with many critics also finding that Breckin Meyer being chosen as Benigni's voice was inappropriate and that he was too young. David Noh of Film Journal International referred to Meyer's performance as a "ridiculously inappropriate Valley Boy voice". Elvis Mitchell of The New York Times stated that the voices "are so sloppy you might feel as if you're watching a 1978 Hong Kong action picture: the dubbed mouths of the Italian cast are probably still moving an hour after the film is over". Mitchell also called it "an oddity that will be avoided by millions of people" and criticized Benigni's decision to play the titular character, opining that his role as Pinocchio is "as believable as Diana Ross playing Dorothy in The Wiz". Howell remarked that, "the distributor Miramax has compounded the problem by overdubbing all the Italian voices in the film with the voices of British and American actors, robbing Pinocchio of much of its European flavour (three theatres in the GTA [were, at the time] showing the original Italian version, with subtitles). Particularly puzzling is the decision to overdub Benigni with the flat American tones of Breckin Meyer (Rat Race), instead of allowing Benigni's own fractured English to inject some badly needed levity (the English voices include Monty Python's John Cleese and Eric Idle, adding to suspicions that these two will take any gig that comes with a paycheque)."

Ken Fox of TV Guide wrote, "there's no getting past the shockingly poorly dubbed voice work of the English-speaking cast; Meyer's voice is particularly shrill and grating", but praised Benigni's performance and make up effects, stating, "he's one Italian icon playing another, and physically, he's actually quite good" and, "the art direction is often exquisite, and the anthropomorphic animal characters are beautifully realized through clever makeup design."

Steven Spielberg said, "I really liked it. In particular, I appreciated his great imagination, the sadness, and the ability to go beyond by also highlighting the dark side of the character."

=== Accolades ===
The original version was nominated for six David di Donatello Awards (winning two) and three Nastro d'Argento (winning one):

- David di Donatello:
  - Best Production Design (Danilo Donati) – won
  - Best Costumes (Danilo Donati) – won
  - Best Actor (Roberto Benigni)
  - Supporting Actor (Kim Rossi Stuart)
  - Best Cinematography (Dante Spinotti)
  - Best Score (Nicola Piovani)
- Nastro d'Argento:
  - Nastro d'Argento for Best Score (Nicola Piovani) – won
  - Best Supporting Actor (Kim Rossi Stuart)
  - Best Producer (Nicoletta Braschi)

The English dub was nominated for six Golden Raspberry Awards (a first for a foreign-language film) and won one:

- Worst Picture
- Worst Director
- Worst Screenplay
- Worst Actor (Roberto Benigni "Dubbed Godzilla-style" by Breckin Meyer) – won
- Worst Remake or Sequel
- Worst Screen Couple (Roberto Benigni and Nicoletta Braschi)

== See also ==
- List of films with a 0% rating on Rotten Tomatoes
- List of submissions to the 75th Academy Awards for Best Foreign Language Film
- List of Italian submissions for the Academy Award for Best Foreign Language Film
- Pinocchio (2019) – another adaption that Roberto Benigni starred in, but this time in a different role (as Geppetto)
