= Johnny Stecchino =

1991 Italian film by Roberto Benigni

- Theatrical release poster
- Directed by: Roberto Benigni
- Written by: Roberto Benigni; Vincenzo Cerami
- Produced by: Mario Cecchi Gori; Vittorio Cecchi Gori
- Starring: Roberto Benigni; Nicoletta Braschi
- Cinematography: Giuseppe Lanci
- Edited by: Nino Baragli
- Music by: Evan Lurie
- Production companies: Cecchi Gori Group Tiger Cinematografica; Pentafilm
- Distributed by: Penta Distribuzione; Variety Distribution
- Release date: 24 October 1991
- Running time: 122 minutes (original Italian version)
- Country: Italy
- Language: Italian
- Box office: 39 billion liras (Italy)

Johnny Stecchino is a 1991 Italian comedy film directed by, co-written by and starring Roberto Benigni in dual roles. This film is one of Benigni's many collaborations with co-star and wife, Nicoletta Braschi. It was the highest-grossing film of all time in Italy with a gross of 39 billion liras.

This film follows the life of Dante, a quirky school bus driver (Benigni) for students with Down syndrome, who bears a striking resemblance to Johnny Stecchino, an Italian mafioso who is wanted by Sicilian mobsters for treason and murder. Dante meets Maria (Braschi), Johnny Stecchino's wife, who plans to trick the Sicilian mobsters into killing Dante instead of Johnny.

The U.S. version released in theaters and on VHS is about 20 minutes shorter than the full Italian version. It trims several conversations including the final scene with Lillo accidentally sniffing cocaine.

== Plot ==
After unsuccessfully hitting on his co-worker and other women at a soiree, Dante meets Maria after she nearly runs him over with her car. Maria is taken aback by Dante's striking resemblance to her husband Johnny Stecchino, an Italian mobster wanted by the Sicilian Mafia for killing mobster Cozzamara's wife and despised by the locals of Palermo for treason.

During the day, Dante works in Cesena as a bus driver for students with Down syndrome, defrauds the government into receiving disability payments for a faked disability, and steals bananas from greengrocers. Dante's best friend is Lillo, a student with Down syndrome and diabetes, whom he has to constantly deter from eating sweets.

Dante runs into Maria a second time near his apartment. Maria, unbeknownst to him, has tracked him down in a plan to turn him over to the Sicilian mafia so they can kill him, thinking that he is Johnny. Maria begins to make Dante's appearance more identical to Johnny Stecchino, by dressing him in a similar suit and tie, placing a faux mole on his face and convincing him to have a toothpick in his mouth at all times ('stecchino' is toothpick in Italian). Maria then begins to refer to Dante as 'Johnny' or 'my Johnny'. She later invites Dante to her residence in Palermo where she begins to plan his murder so she and the real Johnny Stecchino can escape to South America.

Upon arriving at the train station, Dante meets Maria's 'uncle' D'Agata, a cocaine user. When a naïve Dante asks about cocaine, D'Agata gives the excuse that he is merely taking his diabetes medicine. Later, while attempting to steal a banana from local greengrocer Nicola Travaglia, mobsters spot Dante and, confusing him for Johnny, begin shooting at him. He dodges the hail of bullets, running to the police station where he relates his understanding of the incident to the police chief (that after he stole a banana, the greengrocer had guards try to shoot him for theft). Bewildered by the story, the chief tells him that he has committed a serious crime, but by confessing and turning in the banana, he will be forgiven.

After leaving the police station, Dante runs into Judge Cataratta who, mistaking Dante for Johnny, questions his motives in confessing to the police and turning over evidence. Cataratta advises him to forcefully take back the evidence and demand the chief print the story on the front page of newspapers, denouncing his confession. Maria finds Dante strolling through the streets unharmed and, though surprised, returns with him to her residence. Johnny's belief that Dante bears no resemblance to him is only reinforced upon hearing that Dante spent the morning in Palermo going unnoticed by locals.

As a final attempt to determine if the public will mistake him for Johnny, Maria takes Dante to an opera. Upon arriving, Dante sees fruit sold at a concession stand. The vendor offers him a banana, but Dante tries to pay, fearful of the earlier uproar. While waiting for the show to commence, the crowd interrupts the show, beginning to jeer Dante, thinking he is Johnny, which Dante confuses as a public reprimand for not paying for the banana. When the crowd begins to shame Maria as an accomplice, Dante shouts down all the hecklers to respect her honor. He is escorted by the police to a private party where he meets a politician, an accomplice of Johnny, who will protect him if they keep their meeting a secret. As a gift, he gives Dante a bag of cocaine. Maria meets up with Dante and both retreat back to her residence. The next day, Maria meets Cozzamara to plan the assassination of Johnny Stecchino.

On the day of the planned hit, Maria learns of Johnny's plan to kill her 'uncle' after Dante has been killed, upsetting news to Maria. She drops off Dante at a barbershop owned by Cozzamara. Cozzamara's men begin to suspect Dante is not Johnny when they notice the faux facial mole, and they ask him about his mother, a question which would have upset Johnny (his mother is deceased and he gets very angry when someone discusses her), to which Dante replies "she is okay". Maria ends up setting up Johnny by kissing him at a gas station, an act which he despises, and he in turn goes to use the men's room to wash his face. While using one of the urinals, several armed Sicilian mobsters come out of the stalls to seal his doom. Johnny Stecchino realizes Maria's plot and reluctantly accepts his fate. Meanwhile, the other mobsters are laughing uproariously at Dante's jokes and proceed to sing a song Dante taught them.

Maria drives Dante back to his apartment, using his real name, and telling him she'll be back to see him someday. She walks away a free woman, satisfied that she has done the right thing. Dante meets with Lillo outside of his apartment, relating to him his time in Palermo, and of the experience as wacky customs of the locals. The film ends with Lillo running rampantly after sniffing a bag of cocaine, Dante's gift to Lillo, which he thinks is medicine for diabetes.

== Cast ==
- Roberto Benigni: Dante Ceccarini / Johnny Stecchino
- Nicoletta Braschi: Maria
- Paolo Bonacelli: D'Agata, the lawyer / the "uncle"
- Franco Volpi: minister
- Ivano Marescotti: Dr. Randazzo
- Turi Scalia: Judge Bernardino Cataratta
- Ignazio Pappalardo: Filippo Cozzamara
- Loredana Romito: Gianna
- Tony Sperandeo: mafioso
- Salvatore Borghese: Ignazio
