= Oggetti smarriti =

1980 film by Giuseppe Bertolucci

- Directed by: Giuseppe Bertolucci
- Starring: Mariangela Melato; Bruno Ganz
- Cinematography: Renato Tafuri
- Music by: Enrico Rava
- Release date: 1980
- Country: Italy
- Language: Italian

Oggetti smarriti (internationally released as Lost and Found, Lost Objects and An Italian Woman) is a |1980 Italian comedy-drama film directed by Giuseppe Bertolucci. It entered the Quinzaine des Réalisateurs section at the 1980 Cannes Film Festival.

== Cast ==
- Mariangela Melato as Marta
- Bruno Ganz as Werner
- Renato Salvatori as Davide
- Maria Luisa Santella as Gina
- Laura Morante as Sara
- Dina Sassoli as Suocera
