= The Strangeness of Life =

- Directed by: Giuseppe Bertolucci
- Cinematography: Renato Tafuri
- Edited by: Nino Baragli
- Music by: Nicola Piovani
- Release date: 1987
- Running time: 99 minutes
- Country: Italy
- Language: Italian

Strana la vita, internationally released as The Strangeness of Life, is a 1987 Italian comedy-drama film directed by Giuseppe Bertolucci. It is based on a novel by Giovanni Pascutto.

== Cast ==
- Diego Abatantuono: Dario
- Monica Guerritore: Anna
- Domiziana Giordano: Silvia
- Amanda Sandrelli: Ester
- Massimo Venturiello: Mario
- Lina Sastri: Nora
- Felice Andreasi: father of Nora
- Maria Monti: mother of Anna
- Nick Novecento: Giacomino
- Anita Laurenzi: mother of Nora
- Claudio Bisio: a patient
