= Berlinguer, I Love You =

- Directed by: Giuseppe Bertolucci
- Written by: Giuseppe Bertolucci; Roberto Benigni
- Produced by: Gianni Minervini; Antonio Avati
- Starring: Roberto Benigni; Alida Valli; Carlo Monni
- Cinematography: Renato Tafuri
- Edited by: Gabriella Cristiani
- Music by: Pier Luigi Farri
- Distributed by: Euro International Film
- Release date: 6 October 1977
- Running time: 90 minutes
- Country: Italy
- Language: Italian

Berlinguer ti voglio bene (internationally released as Berlinguer, I Love You) is a 1977 Italian comedy film written and directed by Giuseppe Bertolucci. It is the debut film for both Bertolucci and Roberto Benigni.

It is based on the stage play Cioni Mario di Gaspare fu Giulia, which Bertolucci wrote and directed in 1975 and in which Benigni played the character of Mario Cioni, a character he later resumed in the television mini-series Onda libera. The title quotes Cioni's declaration of love for Enrico Berlinguer, then leader of the Italian Communist Party.

== Plot ==
Mario is a man of the underclass of Tuscany, who works as a construction worker and lives in the myth of Enrico Berlinguer. Mario has an Oedipus complex, being very attached to his mother, and his friends make jokes of him. When he loses a game of cards with Bozzone, one of his friend, he doesn't know how to deal with his gambling debt and the friend asks him for payment to have sex with his mother. Mario's mother and Bozzone, after the first experience, will begin to like each other and live like a real family, upsetting Mario's life further.

== Cast ==
- Roberto Benigni: Mario Cioni
- Alida Valli: Mario's mother
- Carlo Monni: Bozzone
- Mario Pachi: Gnorante
