= The Tiger and the Snow =

- Italian: La tigre e la neve
- Directed by: Roberto Benigni
- Written by: Roberto Benigni; Vincenzo Cerami
- Produced by: Nicoletta Braschi
- Starring: Roberto Benigni; Jean Reno; Nicoletta Braschi; Emilia Fox
- Cinematography: Fabio Cianchetti
- Edited by: Massimo Fiocchi
- Production company: Melampo Cinematografica
- Distributed by: 01 Distribution
- Release date: 2005
- Running time: 118 minutes
- Country: Italy
- Languages: Italian; English; Arabic
- Box office: $16 million (Italy)

The Tiger and the Snow (Italian: La tigre e la neve) is a 2005 Italian comedy-drama film starring and directed by Roberto Benigni. Inspired by the fairy tale Sleeping Beauty, the film is set in Rome and Baghdad during the invasion of Iraq in 2003, and follows the protagonist Attilio as he desperately journeys to Baghdad to save the love of his life, Vittoria, from her impending death.

== Plot ==
In 2003 Italy, Attilio de Giovanni, a comical and impassioned poetry professor and the divorced father of two teenage girls, is hopelessly in love with Vittoria, a coworker and writer. Vittoria is the subject of Attilio's many dreams that center around a wedding between him and Vittoria. Attilio's strenuous courtship is unsuccessful, yet he does not lose hope, despite the fact that Vittoria obviously does not share the same feelings. She tells him that she will agree to marry him only when she sees a tiger walking on the snow.

Vittoria goes to Iraq to write the biography of the poet Fuad, Attilio's close friend, who is returning to his country after 18 years living in France. In Baghdad, she is wounded as collateral damage during the invasion of Iraq. By impersonating a Red Cross surgeon, Attilio sneaks onto a flight to Baghdad in a desperate attempt to save her life. He finds Vittoria in an Iraqi hospital. Fuad directs Attilio to an old Iraqi pharmacist, who suggests ancient treatments that manage to keep her alive, temporarily. Attilio locates scuba gear to provide Vittoria with oxygen and a flyswatter, which he jokingly calls the "weapon of mass destruction" the US is looking for in Iraq.

Still needing more medicinal supplies to revive Vittoria, Attilio journeys to an Italian Red Cross encampment and returns with more comprehensive supplies that will nurse Vittoria back to health.

Attilio then goes to Fuad's house to report his success, but finds that Fuad has hanged himself. Attilio had not picked up on Fuad's behavior and speech earlier in the film indicating his suicidal plans, for he had been too preoccupied with trying to save Vittoria. Just before Vittoria emerges from her coma, Attilio is mistaken for an enemy combatant and is captured by the US Army, but is soon freed and allowed to return to Italy.

In the final scenes it is revealed that Vittoria is actually Attilio's ex-wife. They were likely separated because of Attilio's excitability and insane diversions, along with his earlier involvements with another woman. Attilio awkwardly visits Vittoria and their children several times, clearly showing his infatuation in her. On the same day Attilio returns to his country, there is an animal breakout due to a fire at the circus. Vittoria, driving her car, stops to see an escaped tiger in the middle of the road under falling ashes from the fire on the vicinity that resembles snowfall.

Though Attilio refuses to admit he is the "wonderful stranger who saved her," Vittoria suddenly recognizes his familiar way of kissing her forehead in the same manner that the stranger had kissed her when she was comatose in the hospital, as well as how Vittoria's missing necklace (which Attilio took to safeguard earlier) is seen hanging from his neck.

== Cast ==
- Roberto Benigni as Attilio de Giovanni, a poetry professor who travels to Baghdad to save Vittoria.
- Jean Reno as Fuad, Attilio's friend and fellow poet who also travels to Baghdad.
- Nicoletta Braschi as Vittoria, Attilio's love interest who consistently evades his approaches and is comatose for most of the film due to being badly hurt in Baghdad.
- Emilia Fox as Nancy, a Briton who works at the school Attilio teaches at.
- Giuseppe Battiston as Ermanno.
- Tom Waits as himself.
- Andrea Renzi as Doctor Guazzelli.
- Gianfranco Varetto as Attorney Scuotilancia.
- Chiara Pirri as Emilia, one of Attilio's daughters.
- Anna Pirri as Rosa, another of Attilio's daughters.
- Martin Sherman as an American soldier.

== Production ==
The Iraq scenes were filmed in Tunisia, with M60A1 Patton tanks borrowed from the Tunisian military to stand-in for M1 Abrams tanks. Many of the U.S. soldiers were played by Italian extras. Dale Dye served the production as a military technical advisor.

== Reception ==
On Rotten Tomatoes, the film has an approval rating of 20% based on reviews from 25 critics, with an average rating of four out of ten. The website's critics consensus reads: "The Tiger and the Snow proves Roberto Benigni's antics are bizarrely ill-suited for a film seeking to strike the unwieldy balance between romance, comedy, and wartime drama." On Metacritic, the film has a score of 22 based on reviews from ten critics, indicating "generally unfavorable reviews".

Deborah Young of Variety wrote: "Like an Iraq-war mirror image of Life Is Beautiful, actor-director Roberto Benigni's The Tiger and the Snow re-runs the successful structure and comic persona of the 1998 Oscar-winning film in a trippy fantasia about a poet who follows his love to hell and, in this happier ending, back."

The film opened at number one at the box office in Italy and was there for three weeks, grossing $15.8 million in its first four weeks.

=== Accolades ===
Date	Award	Category	Recipients	Result	Ref.
2007	Stinkers Bad Movie Awards	Worst Actor	Roberto Benigni	Nominated	
