= Nicoletta Braschi =

Italian actress and producer (born 1960)

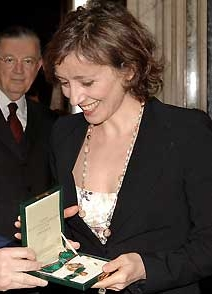
- Braschi in 2005
- Born: 19 April 1960 (age 66); Cesena, Italy
- Occupations: Actress; producer
- Years active: 1983–present
- Spouse: Roberto Benigni (m. 1991)

Nicoletta Braschi (Italian: [nikoˈletta ˈbraski]; born 19 April 1960) is an Italian actress and producer, best known for her work with her husband, actor and director Roberto Benigni.

== Life and career ==
Born in Cesena, Braschi studied in Rome's Academy of Dramatic Arts, where she first met Benigni in 1980. Her first film was with Benigni in 1983, the comedy Tu mi turbi (You Upset Me). She later appeared in two Jim Jarmusch films, Down by Law and Mystery Train.

Braschi's two most successful collaborations with her husband were Johnny Stecchino (1991) and La vita è bella (Life is Beautiful) (1997). The first, an Italian comedy that cast the actress as the girlfriend of a mobster (Benigni), was a huge hit in Italy, while the second, in which Braschi played the wife of an Italian Jew (Benigni) imprisoned in a concentration camp, was a widely praised success that launched both Braschi and her husband into the international spotlight. She was nominated for a Screen Actors Guild award as a cast member of that film.

In 1997, Braschi starred in Ovosodo as a depressed teacher encouraging a student to work and study harder. The film won her a David di Donatello award (Italy's equivalent of the Oscars) and much praise from critics and the public.

In 2002, she was a member of the jury at the 52nd Berlin Film Festival.

In 2005, she starred in and produced The Tiger and the Snow (La tigre e la neve), a love story set during the initial stages of the Iraq War. This was her last film appearance until the 2018 film Happy as Lazzaro.

In 2010, she toured Italian theatres, starring in Tradimenti, based on Harold Pinter's play Betrayal.

In 2013, she was a member of the Cinéfondation and short films jury at the 66th Cannes Film Festival.

== Filmography ==
Year	Film	Role	Ref
1983	Tu mi turbi	Virgin Mary	
1986	Down by law	Nicoletta	
1988	Ya bon les blancs	Luisa	
1988	The Little Devil	Nina	
1989	Mystery Train	Luisa (segment "Ghost")	
1990	The Sheltering Sky	French Woman	
1991	La domenica specialmente (aka Especially on Sunday)	Nicoletta (segment La domenica specialmente)	
1991	Johnny Stecchino	Maria	
1993	Son of the Pink Panther	Jacqueline Gambrelli	
1994	The Monster	Jessica Rossetti	
1995	Pasolini, un delitto italiano (aka Who killed Pasolini?)	Graziella Chiracossi	
1995	Sostiene Pereira	Marta	
1997	Ovosodo (aka Hardboiled Egg)	Giovanna Fornari	
1997	Life is Beautiful	Dora Orefice	
2002	Pinocchio	Blue Fairy	
2004	Mi piace lavorare (aka Mobbing)	Anna	
2005	The Tiger and the Snow	Vittoria	
2018	Happy as Lazzaro	Alfonsina De Luna	
