= Roberto Benigni =

Italian actor, comedian, screenwriter, and film director (born 1952)

Roberto Benigni OMRI
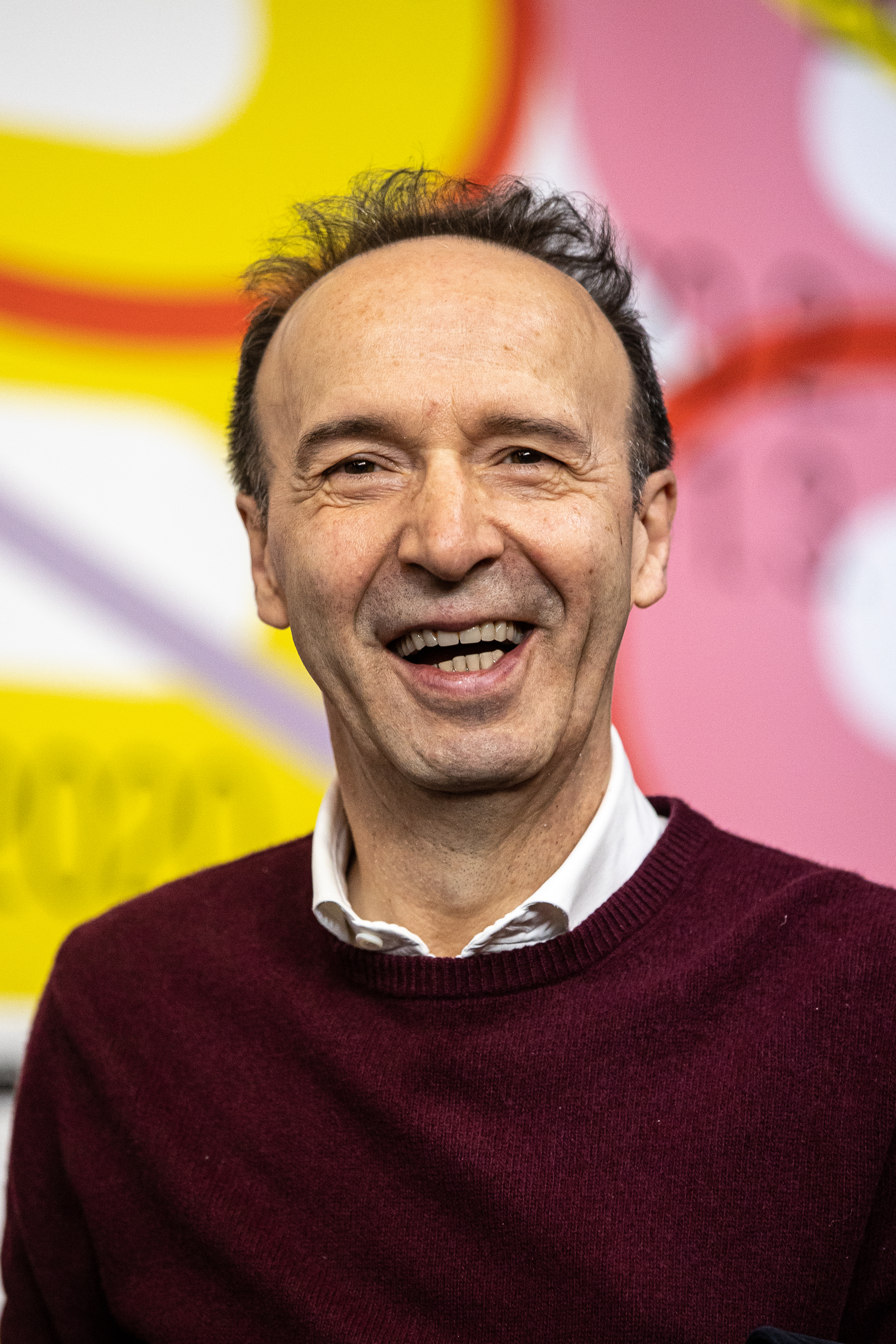
- Benigni at the 70th Berlin International Film Festival in 2020
- Born: Roberto Remigio Benigni; 27 October 1952 (age 74); Castiglion Fiorentino, Tuscany, Italy
- Education: École Philippe Gaulier
- Occupations: Actor; comedian; screenwriter; film director
- Years active: 1970–present
- Style: Comedy film; comedy drama; tragicomedy
- Spouse: Nicoletta Braschi (m. 1991)

Roberto Remigio Benigni (/bəˈniːnjiː/ bə-NEE-nyee; Italian: [roˈbɛrto beˈniɲɲi]; born 27 October 1952) is an Italian actor, comedian, screenwriter, and film director. He gained international recognition for writing, directing, and starring in the Holocaust comedy drama film Life Is Beautiful (1997), for which he received the Academy Awards for Best Actor and Best International Feature Film. Benigni is the first, and only, recipient of an Academy Award for Best Actor for a non-English language performance.

Benigni made his acting debut in 1977's Berlinguer, I Love You, which he also wrote and which was directed by Giuseppe Bertolucci. Benigni's directorial debut was the 1983 anthology film Tu mi turbi, which was also the acting debut of his wife, Nicoletta Braschi. He continued directing and also starring in the comedic films Nothing Left to Do But Cry (1984), The Little Devil (1988), Johnny Stecchino (1991), The Monster (1994), the award-winning film Life Is Beautiful (1997), Pinocchio (2002, as the title character), and The Tiger and the Snow (2005).

Benigni acted in the Jim Jarmusch films Down by Law (1986), Night on Earth (1991), and Coffee and Cigarettes (2003). He also acted in Federico Fellini's The Voice of the Moon (1990), Blake Edwards' Son of the Pink Panther (1993), Woody Allen's To Rome with Love (2012), and Matteo Garrone's Pinocchio (2019, as Geppetto).

== Early life ==
Benigni was born on 27 October 1952 in Manciano La Misericordia (a frazione of Castiglion Fiorentino), Tuscany, the son of Isolina Papini (1919–2004), a fabric maker, and Luigi Benigni (1919–2004), a bricklayer, carpenter, and farmer. He has three sisters: Bruna (born 1945), Albertina (born 1947) and Anna (born 1948). He was raised Catholic and served as an altar boy; later in his life he became an atheist, but then resumed his interest in religious topics, such as the Ten Commandments and the Song of Songs.

His first experiences as a theatre actor took place in 1971, in Prato. During that autumn he moved to Rome where he took part in some experimental theatre shows, some of which he also directed. In 1975, Benigni had his first theatrical success with Cioni Mario di Gaspare fu Giulia, written by Giuseppe Bertolucci. Benigni studied clown under Philippe Gaulier at École Philippe Gaulier.

Benigni became widely known in Italy in the 1970s for a television series called Onda Libera, on Rai 2, produced by Renzo Arbore, in which he interpreted the satirical piece The Hymn of the Body Purged (L'inno del corpo sciolto, a scatological song about the joys of defecation). A great scandal for the time, the series was suspended due to censorship. His first film was 1977's Berlinguer, I Love You (Berlinguer ti voglio bene), also by Bertolucci.

His popularity increased with L'altra domenica (1976–1979), another TV show of Arbore's in which Benigni portrayed a lazy film critic who never watches the films he's asked to review. Bernardo Bertolucci then cast him in a small speechless role as a window upholsterer in the film La Luna which had limited American distribution due to its subject matter.

== Career ==
=== Early roles ===
In 1980 he met Cesenate actress Nicoletta Braschi, who became his wife on 26 December 1991 and who has starred in most of the films he has directed.

In June 1983 he appeared during a public political demonstration by the Italian Communist Party, with which he was a sympathiser, and on this occasion, he lifted and cradled the party's national leader Enrico Berlinguer. It was an unprecedented act, given that until that moment Italian politicians were proverbially serious and formal. Benigni was censored again in the 1980s for calling Pope John Paul II something impolite during an important live TV show (Wojtylaccio, meaning 'Bad Wojtyla' in Italian, but with a somewhat friendly meaning in Tuscan dialect).

Benigni's first film as director was Tu mi turbi (You Upset Me) in 1983. This film was also his first collaboration with Braschi.

In 1984, he played in Non ci resta che piangere ('Nothing Left to Do but Cry') with comic actor Massimo Troisi. The story was a fable in which the protagonists are suddenly thrown back in time to the 15th century, just a little before 1492. They start looking for Christopher Columbus in order to stop him from discovering the Americas (for very personal reasons), but are not able to reach him.

=== Hollywood roles ===
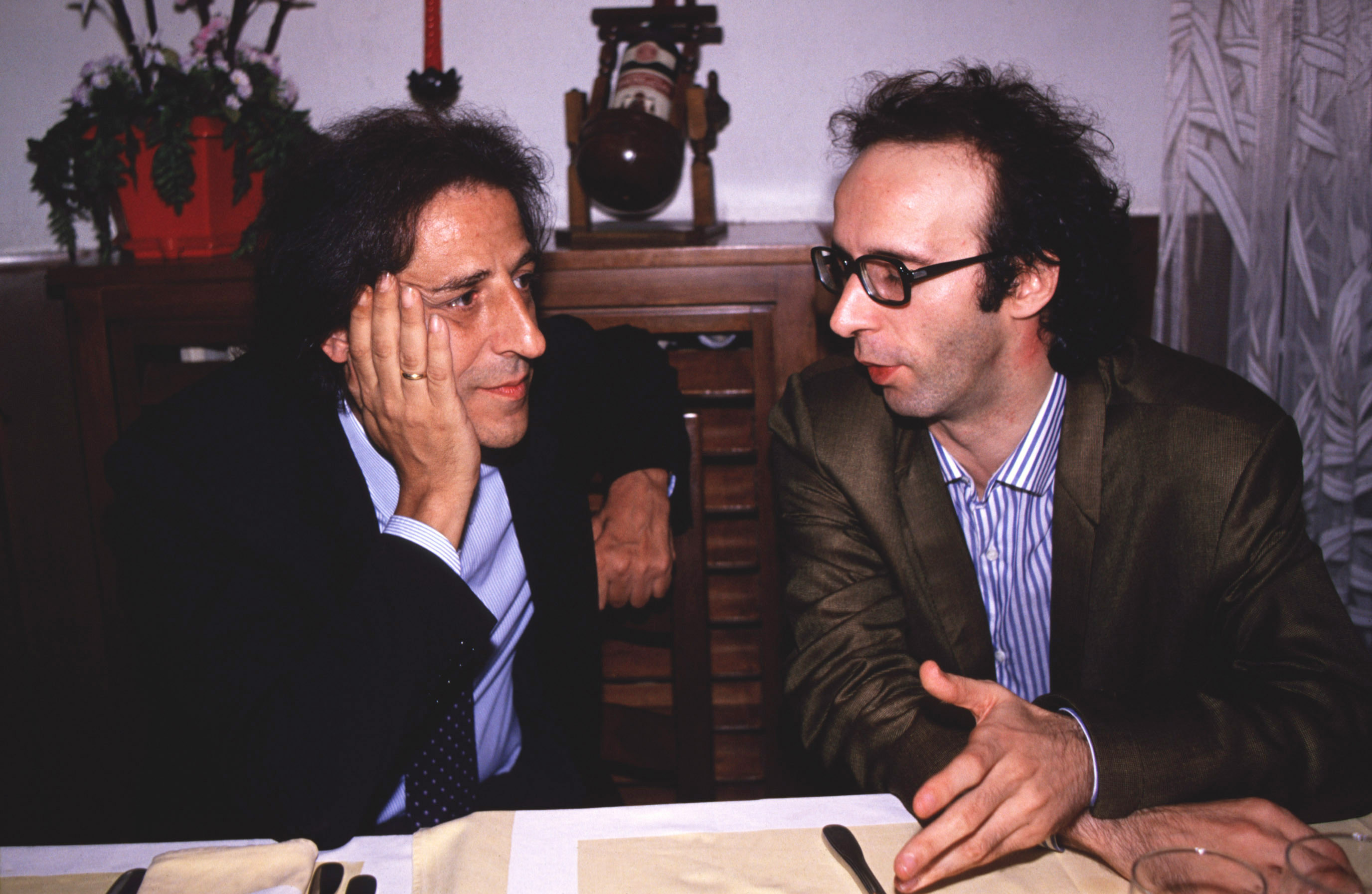
Benigni with Giorgio Gaber in 1990

Beginning in 1986, Benigni starred in three films by American director Jim Jarmusch. In Down By Law (1986) (which in Italy had its title spelt "Daunbailò", in Italian phonetics) he played Bob, an innocent foreigner living in the United States, convicted of manslaughter, whose irrepressible good humour and optimism help him to escape and find love (the film also starred Braschi as his beloved). In Night on Earth (1991) he played a cabbie in Rome, who causes his passenger, a priest, great discomfort and a heart attack by confessing his bizarre sexual experiences. Later, he also starred in the first of Jarmusch's series of short films, Coffee and Cigarettes (2003).

In 1990, he was a member of the Jury at the 40th Berlin International Film Festival.

In 1993, he starred in Son of the Pink Panther, directed by veteran Blake Edwards. Benigni played Peter Sellers' Inspector Clouseau's illegitimate son who is assigned to save the Princess of Lugash. The film bombed in the US, but was a hit in his homeland.

Benigni had a rare serious role in Federico Fellini's last film, La voce della luna ('The Voice of the Moon') (1990). In earlier years Benigni had started a long-lasting collaboration with screenwriter Vincenzo Cerami, for a series of films which scored great success in Italy: Il piccolo diavolo ('The Little Devil') with Walter Matthau, Johnny Stecchino ('Johnny Toothpick'), and Il mostro ('The Monster').

=== Life Is Beautiful ===
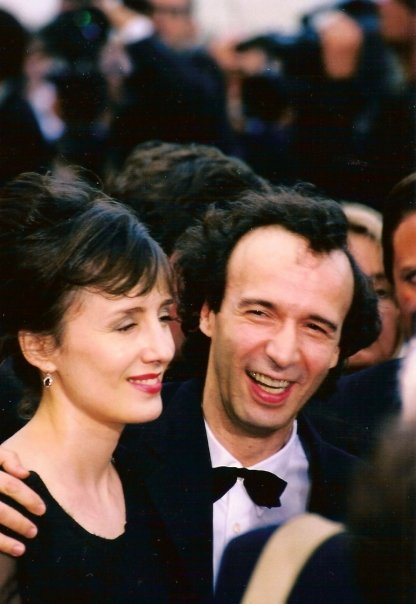
Benigni and wife Nicoletta Braschi at the 1998 Cannes Film Festival

Benigni is widely known outside Italy for his 1997 tragicomedy Life Is Beautiful (La vita è bella), filmed in Arezzo, and co-written by Cerami. The film is about an Italian Jewish man who tries to protect his son's innocence during his internment at a Nazi concentration camp, by telling him that the Holocaust is an elaborate game and he must adhere very carefully to the rules to win. Benigni's father had spent three years in a concentration camp in Bergen-Belsen, and La vita è bella is based in part on his father's experiences. Benigni was also inspired by the story of Holocaust survivor Rubino Romeo Salmonì. Although the story and presentation of the film had been discussed during production with different Jewish groups to limit the offence it might cause, the film was attacked by some critics, who accused it of presenting the Holocaust without much suffering, while others argued that a comedy about such a subject was not appropriate. More favourable critics praised Benigni's artistic daring and skill to create a sensitive comedy involving the Holocaust, a challenge that Charlie Chaplin confessed he would not have taken on with The Great Dictator had he been aware of the true horrors occurring in ghettos and concentration camps in Europe at the time.

In 1998, the film was nominated for seven Academy Awards. At the 1999 ceremony, the film was awarded the Oscar for Best Foreign Language Film (which Benigni accepted as the film's director), Best Original Dramatic Score (the score by Nicola Piovani), and Benigni received the award for Best Actor (the first for a male performer in a non-English-speaking role, and only the third overall acting Oscar for non-English-speaking roles).

Overcome with giddy delight after Life Is Beautiful was announced as the Best Foreign Language Film at the Oscars, Benigni climbed over and then stood on the backs of the seats in front of him and applauded the audience before proceeding to the stage. After winning his Best Actor Oscar later in the evening, he said in his acceptance speech, "This is a terrible mistake because I used up all my English!" To close his speech, Benigni quoted the closing lines of Dante's Divine Comedy (Divina Commedia), referencing "the love that moves the sun and all the stars". At the following year's ceremony, when he read the nominees for Best Actress (won by Hilary Swank for Boys Don't Cry), host Billy Crystal playfully appeared behind him with a large net to restrain Benigni if he got excessive with his antics again. On a 1999 episode of Saturday Night Live, host Ray Romano played him in a sketch parodying his giddy behavior at the ceremony.

=== Later career ===
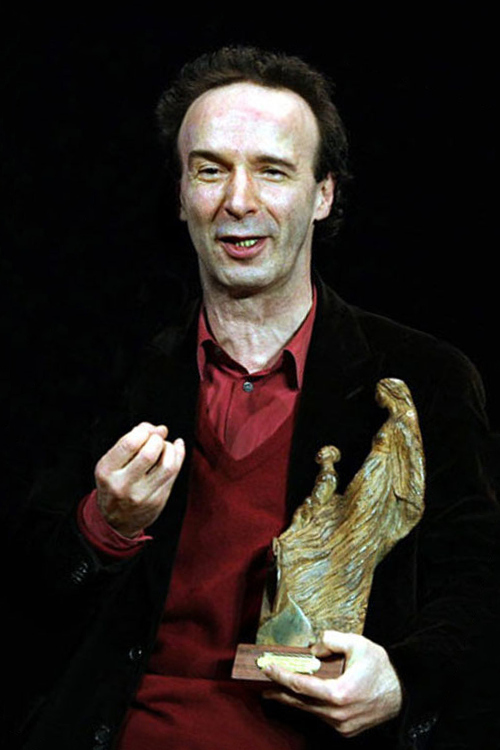
Benigni receiving a prize in Terni, February 2006

Benigni played one of the main characters in Asterix and Obelix vs. Caesar as Detritus, a corrupt Roman provincial governor who wants to kill Julius Caesar, thereby seizing control of the Roman Republic.

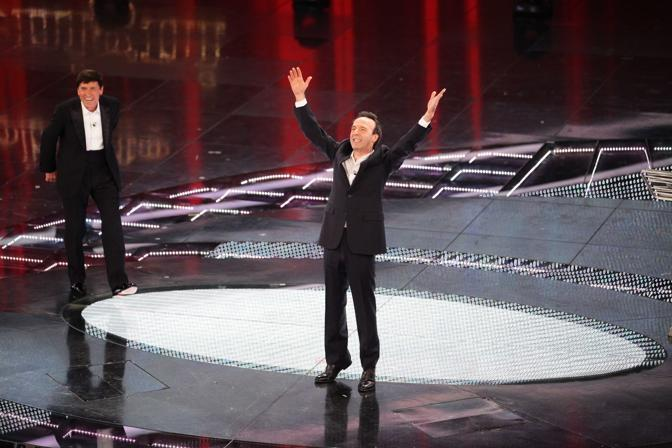
Benigni at the Sanremo Music Festival 2011

That same year, he gave a typically energetic and revealing interview to Canadian filmmaker Damian Pettigrew for Fellini: I'm a Born Liar (2002), a cinematic portrait of the maestro that was nominated for Best Documentary at the European Film Awards. The film went on to win the prestigious Rockie Award for Best Arts Documentary at the Banff World Television Festival (2002) and the Coup de Coeur at the International Sunnyside of the Doc Marseille (2002).

In 2003, Benigni was honored by the National Italian American Foundation (NIAF), receiving the Foundation's NIAF Special Achievement Award in Entertainment.

His film La tigre e la neve (The Tiger and the Snow, 2005) is a love story set during the initial stage of the Iraq War.

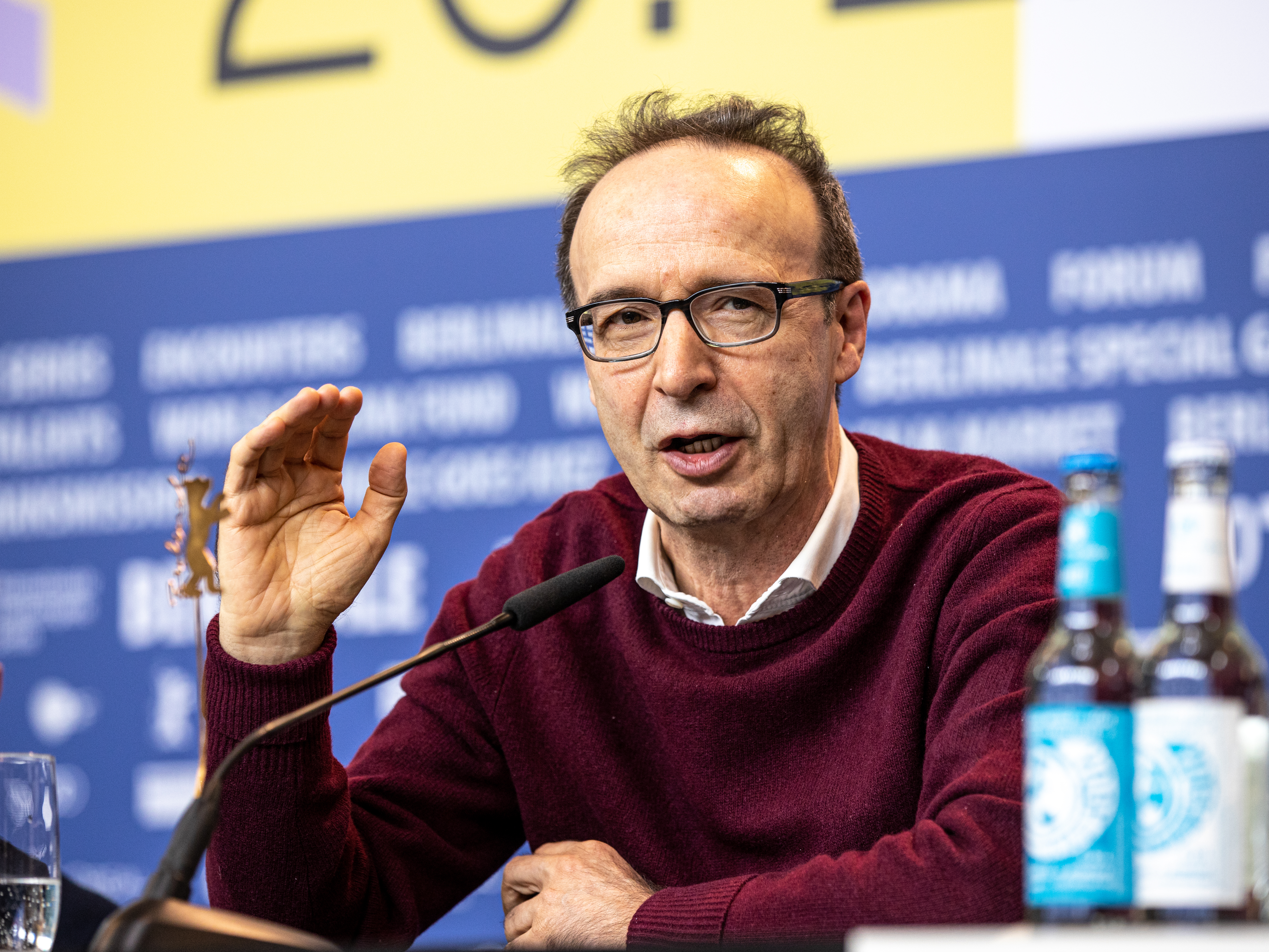
Benigni at the Berlin International Film Festival 2020

On 15 October 2005, he performed an impromptu striptease on Italy's most watched evening news program, removing his shirt and draping it over the newscaster's shoulders. Prior to removing his shirt, Benigni had already hijacked the opening credits of the news program, jumping behind the newscaster and announcing: "Berlusconi has resigned!" (Benigni was an outspoken critic of media tycoon and then former Prime Minister Silvio Berlusconi.) The previous day, he had led a crowd of thousands in Rome on Friday in protest at the centre-right government's decision to cut state arts funding by 35 per cent.

On 2 February 2007, he was awarded the degree of Doctor Honoris Causa by the Katholieke Universiteit Leuven, Belgium. On 22 April 2008, the degree of Doctor Honoris Causa was conferred on him by the University of Malta, celebrated by a Settimana Dantesca including Benigni's first stage appearance at a university and the premiere of his performing with Dante scholar Robert Hollander.

In 2012, he starred in the Woody Allen film, To Rome with Love.

In 2019, he starred as Geppetto in Matteo Garrone's 2019 adaptation of Pinocchio.

=== TuttoDante ===
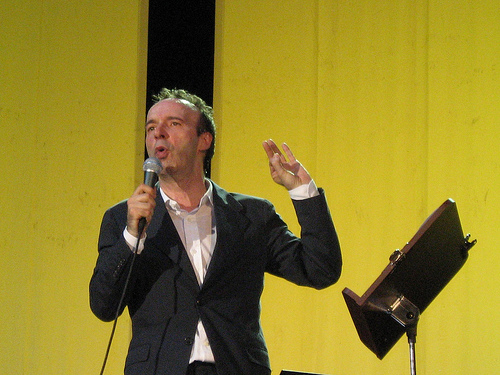
Benigni on the stage of TuttoDante in Padua, June 2008

Benigni is an improvisatory poet (poesia estemporanea is a form of art popularly followed and practised in Tuscany), appreciated for his explanation and recitations of Dante's Divine Comedy (Divina Commedia) from memory.

During 2006 and 2007, Benigni had a lot of success touring Italy with his 90-minute "one-man show" TuttoDante ('Everything About Dante'). Combining current events and memories of his past narrated with an ironic tone, Benigni then begins a journey of poetry and passion through the world of the Divine Comedy.

TuttoDante has been performed in numerous Italian piazzas, arenas, and stadiums for a total of 130 shows, with an estimated audience of about one million spectators. Over 10 million more spectators watched the TV show, Il V canto dell'Inferno ('The 5th Song of Hell'), broadcast by Rai 1 on 29 November 2007, with re-runs on Rai International.

Benigni began North American presentations of TuttoDante with an announcement that he learned English to bring the gift of Dante's work to English speakers. The English performance incorporates dialectic discussion of language and verse and is a celebration of modernity and the concept of human consciousness as created by language.

Benigni brought TuttoDante to the United States, Canada and Argentina in the TuttoDante Tour between 2008 and 2009 with performances in San Francisco, Boston and Chicago. Benigni was feted in San Francisco at a special reception held by the National Italian American Foundation in his honour on 24 May 2009. Following his U.S. premiere Benigni performed his last presentation on 16 June 2009, in Buenos Aires, Argentina where he was awarded Honorary Citizenship of the City of Buenos Aires in a ceremony held at the Legislative Palace in homage to the notable Italian diaspora and culture in Argentina.

== In other media ==
Benigni is also a singer-songwriter. Among his recorded performances are versions of Paolo Conte's songs.

In 2002 was published his compilation-album Quanto t'ho amato.

== Honors ==
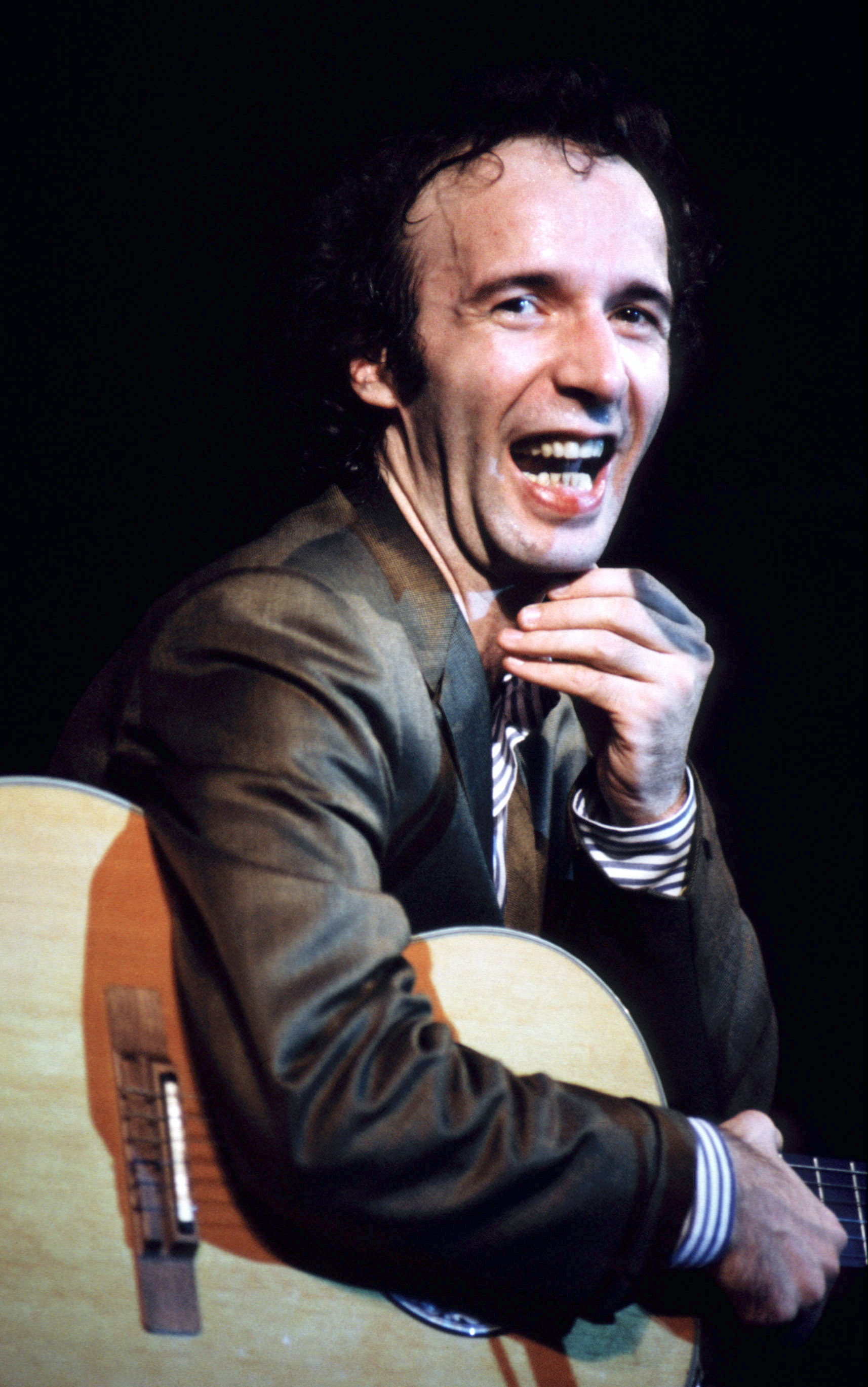
Benigni on stage, 1990

In 1999, a Golden Palm Star on the Palm Springs, California, Walk of Stars was dedicated to him.

=== Honorary degrees ===
In addition to numerous film awards, Benigni has garnered honorary degrees from universities worldwide:

- 1999 – Honorary Doctorate in Philosophy from the Ben-Gurion University of the Negev, Beersheba, Israel.
- 2002 – Honorary Doctorate in Letters from the University of Bologna, Italy.
- 2003 – Honorary Degree in Psychology from the Vita-Salute San Raffaele University, Milan, Italy.
- 2007 – Honorary Doctorate in Letters from the Katholieke Universiteit Leuven, Belgium.
- 2007 – Honorary Degree in Modern Philology from the University of Florence, Italy.
- 2008 – Honorary Doctorate in Letters from the University of Malta, Malta.
- 2008 – Honorary Degree in Communication Arts from the Touro University Rome, Zagarolo, Italy.
- 2012 – Honorary Degree in Modern Philology from the University of Calabria, Italy.
- 2012 – Honorary Doctorate in Letters from the Aristotle University of Thessaloniki, Greece.
- 2015 – Honorary Doctorate in Laws from the University of Toronto, Canada.
- 2024 – Honorary Doctorate in Fine Arts from the University of Notre Dame, United States

== Influence ==
The Europe List, the largest survey on European culture, established that the top three films in European culture are:

1. Benigni's Life Is Beautiful
2. Donnersmarck's The Lives of Others
3. Jean-Pierre Jeunet's Amélie

== Filmography ==
=== Film ===
Year	Title	Role	Notes
1977	Berlinguer, I Love You	Mario Cioni	Also writer
1979	Tigers in Lipstick	Principal	Segment: Una mamma
1979	Womanlight	Barman at Clapsy's	
1979	La Luna	Upholsterer	
1979	I giorni cantati	Professor	
1979	Seeking Asylum	Roberto	
1980	In the Pope's Eye	Himself	
1981	Il minestrone	The Maestro	
1983	Tu mi turbi	Benigno	Also director and writer
1983	"FF.SS." – Cioè: "...che mi hai portato a fare sopra a Posillipo se non mi vuoi più bene?"	Beige Sheikh	
1984	Nothing Left to Do But Cry	Saverio	Also director and writer
1986	Down by Law	Roberto	English speaking film debut
1986	Coffee and Cigarettes	Roberto	Short film
1988	The Little Devil	Giuditta	Also director and writer
1990	The Voice of the Moon	Ivo Salvini	
1991	Night on Earth	Cab Driver	Segment: Rome
1991	Johnny Stecchino	Dante Ceccarini / Johnny Stecchino	Also director and writer
1993	Son of the Pink Panther	Jacques Gambrelli	
1994	The Monster	Loris	Also director, writer and producer
1997	Life Is Beautiful	Guido Orefice	Also director and writer
1999	Asterix & Obelix Take On Caesar	Lucius Detritus	
2002	Pinocchio	Pinocchio	Also director and writer
2003	Caterina in the Big City	Himself	
2003	Coffee and Cigarettes	Roberto	
2005	The Tiger and the Snow	Attilio de Giovanni	Also director and writer
2010	La commedia di Amos Poe	Narrator	Voice
2011	Pistachio - The Little Boy That Woodn't	Head of Italy	Voice
2012	To Rome with Love	Leopoldo Pisanello	
2019	Pinocchio	Geppetto	

=== Television ===
Year	Title	Role	Notes
1972	Sorelle Materassi	Youth	Episode: "Episodio 1"
1976–1977	Onda libera	Mario Cioni	4 episodes Also writer
1979	Ma che cos'è questo amore	The Thinker	2 episodes
1982	Morto Troisi, viva Troisi!	Himself / Anonymous Childhood Friend	Television film

== Awards and nominations ==
Year	Award	Category	Project	Result
1983	David di Donatello	Best New Director	Tu mi turbi	Nominated
1983	Nastro d'Argento	Best New Director	Tu mi turbi	Nominated
1986	Nastro d'Argento	Best Actor	Down by Law	Won
1986	Independent Spirit Award	Best Male Lead	Down by Law	Nominated
1988	David di Donatello	Best Actor	The Little Devil	Won
1988	Nastro d'Argento	Best Director	The Little Devil	Nominated
1988	Nastro d'Argento	Best Actor	The Little Devil	Nominated
1988	Nastro d'Argento	Best Actor	Johnny Stecchino	Won
1988	Nastro d'Argento	Best Screenplay	Johnny Stecchino	Nominated
1993	Razzie Award	Worst New Star	Son of the Pink Panther	Nominated
1998	Academy Award	Best Actor	Life Is Beautiful	Won
1998	Academy Award	Best International Feature Film	Life Is Beautiful	Won
1998	Academy Award	Best Director	Life Is Beautiful	Nominated
1998	Academy Award	Best Original Screenplay	Life Is Beautiful	Nominated
1998	British Academy Film Award	Best Actor in a Leading Role	Life Is Beautiful	Won
1998	British Academy Film Award	Best Original Screenplay	Life Is Beautiful	Nominated
1998	Cannes Film Festival	Palme d'Or	Life Is Beautiful	Nominated
1998	Cannes Film Festival	Grand Prix – Cannes Film Festival	Life Is Beautiful	Won
1998	Critics' Choice Movie Awards	Best Leading Actor	Life Is Beautiful	Nominated
1998	Chicago Film Critics Association	Best Actor	Life Is Beautiful	Nominated
1998	Boston Society of Film Critics	Best Director	Life Is Beautiful	Nominated
1998	David di Donatello	Best Director	Life Is Beautiful	Won
1998	David di Donatello	Best Actor	Life Is Beautiful	Won
1998	David di Donatello	Best Screenplay	Life Is Beautiful	Won
1998	Directors Guild of America Award	Outstanding Directing - Feature Film	Life Is Beautiful	Nominated
1998	European Film Award	Best Actor	Life Is Beautiful	Won
1998	Actor Awards	Outstanding Actor in a Leading Role	Life Is Beautiful	Won
1998	Actor Awards	Outstanding Cast in a Motion Picture	Life Is Beautiful	Nominated
1998	Nastro d'Argento	Best Director	Life Is Beautiful	Won
1998	Nastro d'Argento	Best Actor	Life Is Beautiful	Won
1998	Nastro d'Argento	Best Screenplay	Life Is Beautiful	Won
2002	David di Donatello	Best Actor	Pinocchio	Nominated
2002	Razzie Award	Worst Actor	Pinocchio	Won
2002	Razzie Award	Worst Director	Pinocchio	Nominated
2002	Razzie Award	Worst Screen Couple	Pinocchio	Nominated
2002	Razzie Award	Worst Screenplay	Pinocchio	Nominated
2005	Nastro d'Argento	Best Actor	The Tiger and the Snow	Nominated
2008	César	Honorary César	—N/a	Honored
2019	David di Donatello	Best Supporting Actor	Pinocchio	Won

== Bibliography ==
- Roberto Benigni (1996). Marco Giusti (ed.). E l'alluce fu: monologhi & gag (in Italian). With a chapter by Cesare Garboli. Turin: Einaudi. ISBN 88-06-14184-8.
