= Vincenzo Cerami =

Italian screenwriter

- Born: 2 November 1940; Rome, Italy
- Died: 17 July 2013 (aged 72); Rome, Italy
- Occupations: Screenwriter; Poet
- Years active: 1967–2013

Vincenzo Cerami (2 November 1940 – 17 July 2013) was an Italian screenwriter, novelist and poet.

== Biography ==
From 1967, he contributed or wrote screenplays or adapted screenplays for more than 40 films. In 1996, he was a member of the jury at the 46th Berlin International Film Festival.

In 1976, his first novel Un borghese piccolo piccolo (A Very Normal Man) was published, through the efforts of Italian novelist Italo Calvino. The book was immediately successful, and adapted for film in 1977 by Mario Monicelli. Also critically acclaimed was the verse novel, Addio Lenin (Goodbye Lenin), published in 1981.

In 1999, he was nominated for the Academy Award for Best Original Screenplay for the film Life Is Beautiful.

== Selected filmography ==
- The Silent Stranger (1968)
- The Forgotten Pistolero (1969)
- Blindman (1971)
- The First Time on the Grass (1974)
- An Average Little Man (1977)
- Beach House (1977)
- A Leap in the Dark (1980)
- Il minestrone (1981)
- The Little Devil (1988)
- I ragazzi di via Panisperna (1989)
- Open Doors (1990)
- Freshwater Man (1997)
- Life Is Beautiful (1998)
- Pinocchio (2002)
- The Tiger and the Snow (2005)
- Manuale d'amore (2005)
