= Giuseppe Bertolucci =

Italian film director and screenwriter (1947–2012)

- Born: 27 February 1947; Parma, Italy
- Died: 16 June 2012 (aged 65); Tricase, Italy
- Occupations: Film director, screenwriter
- Years active: 1972–2012

Giuseppe Bertolucci (27 February 1947 – 16 June 2012) was an Italian film director and screenwriter. He directed 26 films between 1972 and 2012. He was the younger brother of Bernardo Bertolucci.

== Selected filmography ==
- Berlinguer, I Love You (Berlinguer ti voglio bene, 1977)
- An Italian Woman (Oggetti smarriti, 1980)
- Secrets Secrets (Segreti segreti, 1984)
- The Strangeness of Life (Strana la vita, 1987)
- The Camels (I cammelli, 1988)
- Especially on Sunday (La domenica specialmente, 1991)
- Troppo Sole (1994)
- The Sweet Sounds of Life (Il dolce rumore della vita, 1999)
- Probably Love (L'amore probabilmente, 2001)
