= 71st Academy Awards =

- Official poster by Arnold Schwartzman
- Date: March 21, 1999
- Site: Dorothy Chandler Pavilion; Los Angeles, California, U.S.
- Hosted by: Whoopi Goldberg
- Preshow hosts: Geena Davis; Jim Moret
- Produced by: Gil Cates
- Directed by: Louis J. Horvitz

Highlights
- Best Picture: Shakespeare in Love
- Most awards: Shakespeare in Love (7)
- Most nominations: Shakespeare in Love (13)

TV in the United States
- Network: ABC
- Duration: 4 hours, 2 minutes
- Ratings: 45.51 million; 28.63% (Nielsen ratings)

The 71st Academy Awards ceremony, organized by the Academy of Motion Picture Arts and Sciences (AMPAS), honored the best of 1998 in film and took place on March 21, 1999, at the Dorothy Chandler Pavilion in Los Angeles beginning at 5:30 p.m. PST / 8:30 p.m. EST. During the ceremony, AMPAS presented Academy Awards (commonly referred to as Oscars) in 24 categories. The ceremony, televised in the United States by ABC, was produced by Gil Cates and directed by Louis J. Horvitz. Actress Whoopi Goldberg hosted the show for the third time. She first hosted the 66th ceremony held in 1994 and had last hosted the 68th ceremony in 1996. Nearly a month earlier in a ceremony held at the Regent Beverly Wilshire Hotel in Beverly Hills, California on February 27, the Academy Awards for Technical Achievement were presented by host Anne Heche.

Shakespeare in Love won seven awards, including Best Picture. Other winners included Saving Private Ryan with five awards, Life Is Beautiful with three, and Affliction, Bunny, Election Night, Elizabeth, Gods and Monsters, The Last Days, The Personals: Improvisations on Romance in the Golden Years, The Prince of Egypt, and What Dreams May Come with one. The telecast garnered nearly 46 million viewers in the United States.

== Winners and nominees ==
The nominees for the 71st Academy Awards were announced on February 9, 1999, at the Samuel Goldwyn Theater in Beverly Hills, California, by Robert Rehme, president of the Academy, and the actor Kevin Spacey. Shakespeare in Love earned the most nominations with 13; Saving Private Ryan came in second place with 11.

The winners were announced during the awards ceremony on March 21, 1999. Life Is Beautiful was the second film nominated simultaneously for Best Picture and Best Foreign Language Film in the same year (the first being Z in 1969). Best Actor winner Roberto Benigni was the second person to direct himself to an acting Oscar win. Laurence Olivier first achieved this feat for his performance in 1948's Hamlet. He also became the fourth individual to earn acting, directing, screenwriting nominations for the same film. In addition, Benigni was the third performer to win an Oscar for a non-English speaking role. Best Actress nominee Fernanda Montenegro was the first Latina to be nominated in that category. By virtue of their nominations for portraying Queen Elizabeth I of England, Best Actress nominee Cate Blanchett and Best Supporting Actress winner Judi Dench became the first pair of actresses to earn acting nominations in the same year for portraying the same character in different films.

=== Awards ===
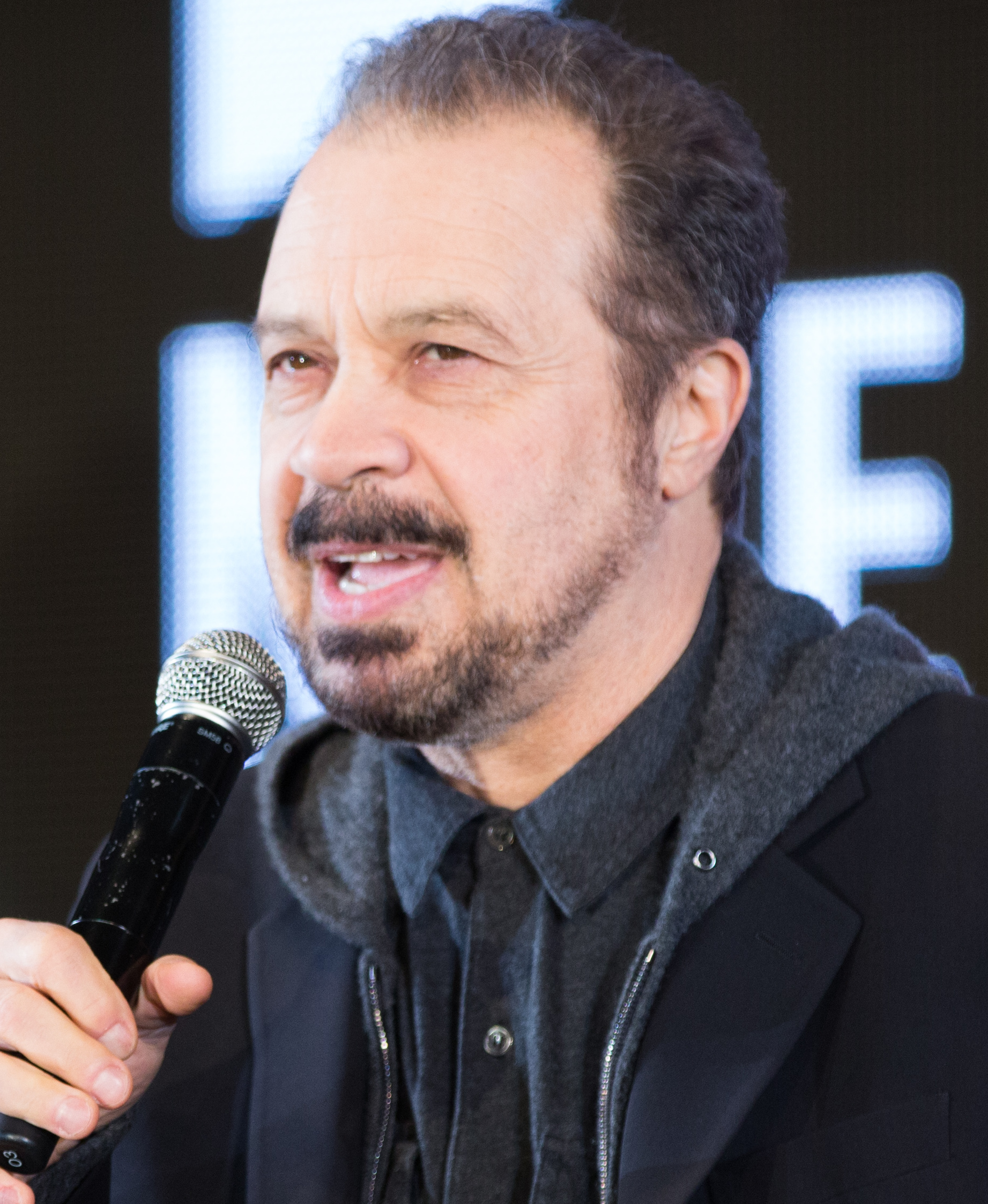
Edward Zwick, Best Picture co-winner

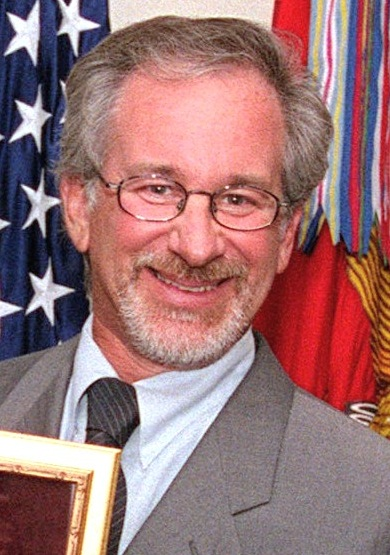
Steven Spielberg, Best Director winner

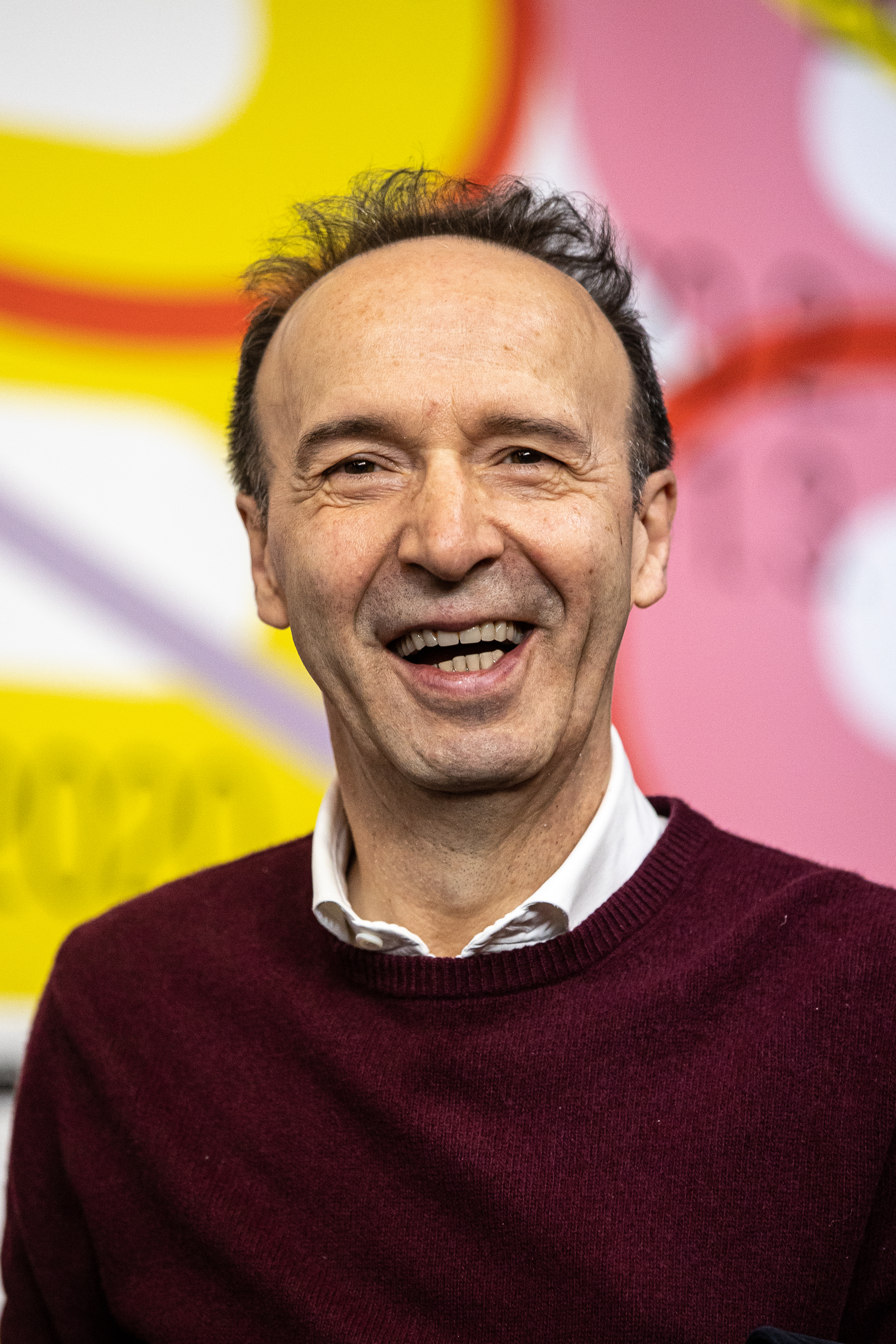
Roberto Benigni, Best Actor and Best Foreign Language Film winner

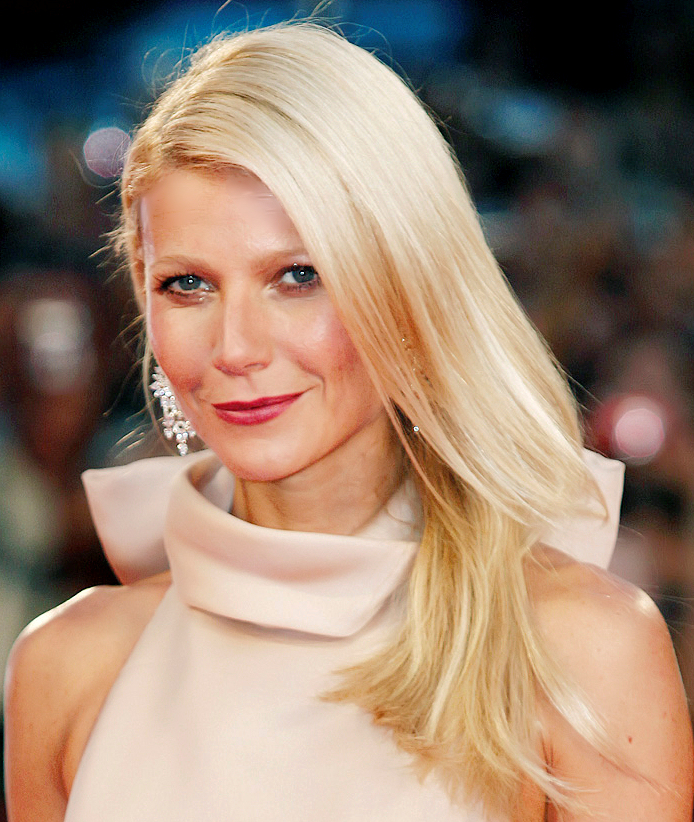
Gwyneth Paltrow, Best Actress winner

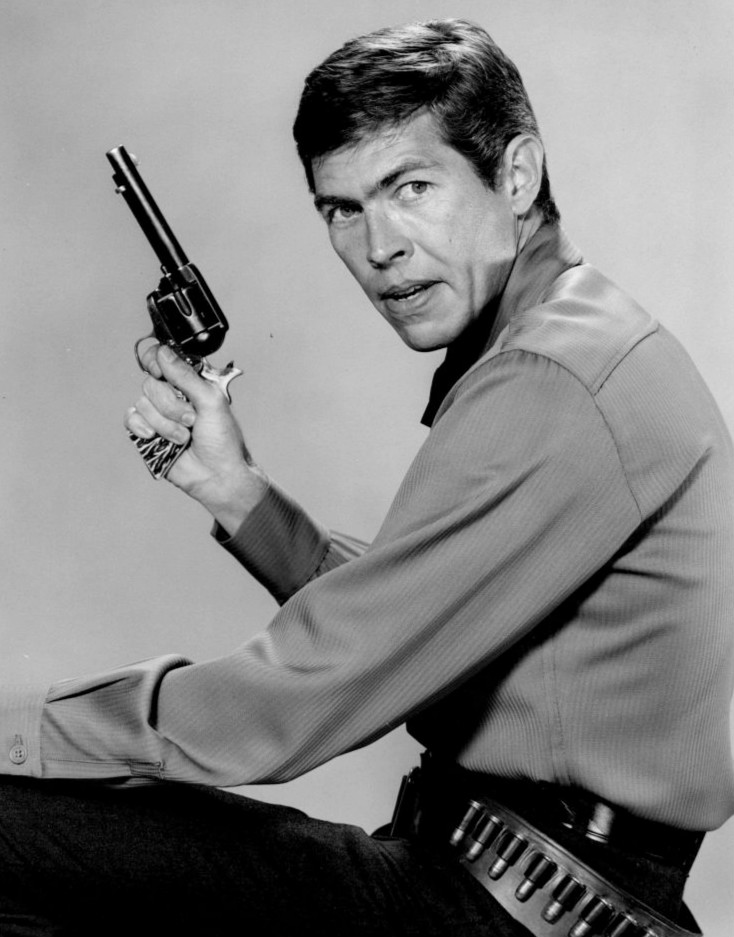
James Coburn, Best Supporting Actor winner

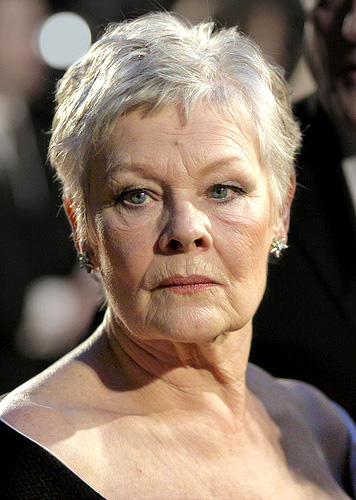
Judi Dench, Best Supporting Actress winner

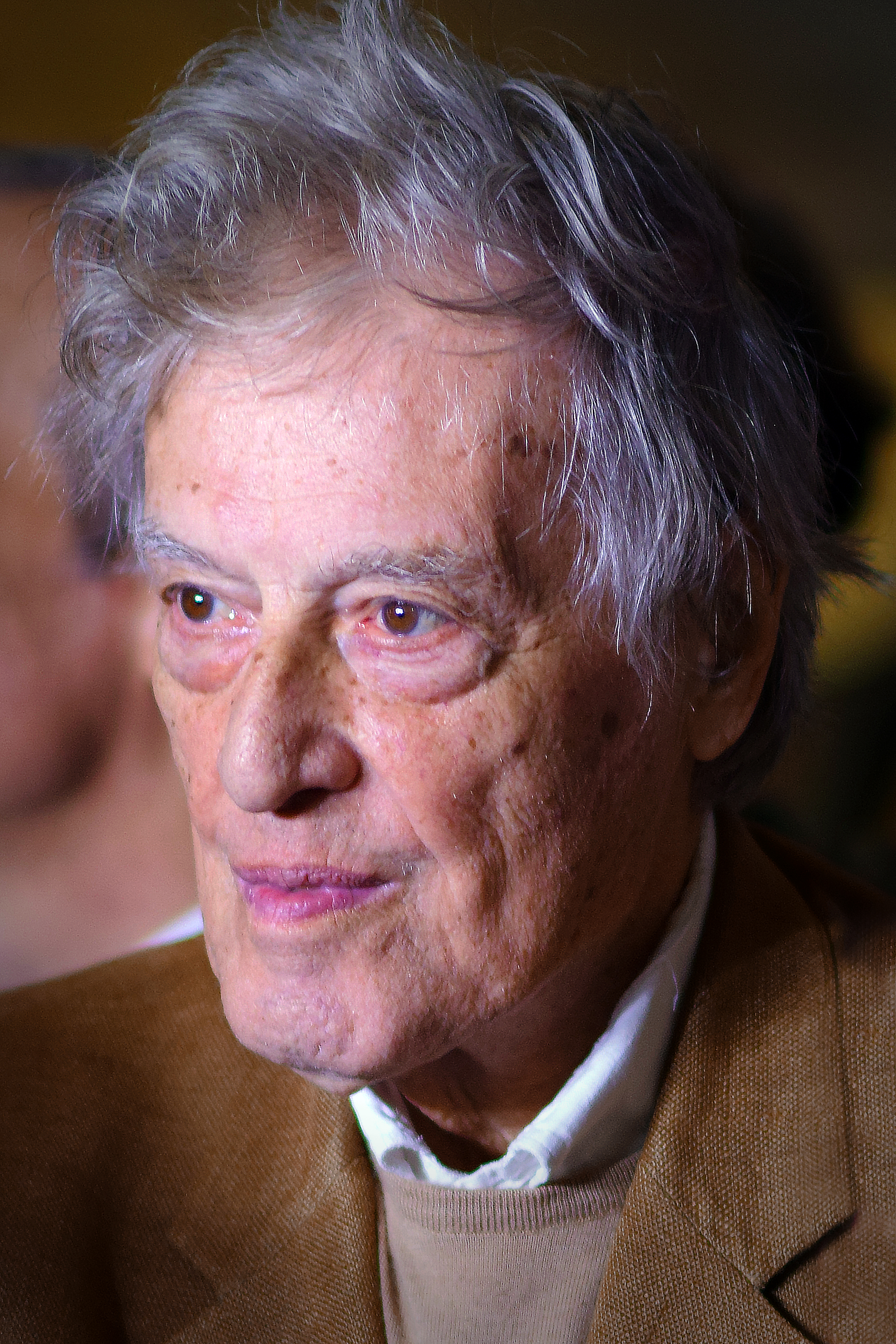
Tom Stoppard, Best Original Screenplay co-winner

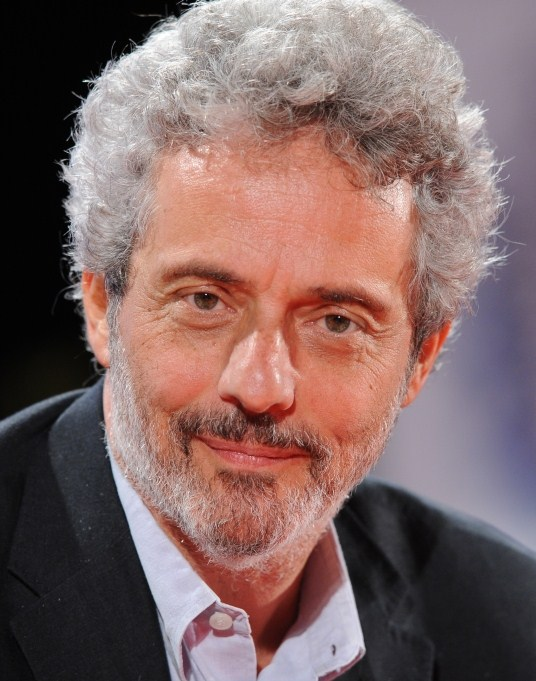
Nicola Piovani, Best Original Dramatic Score winner

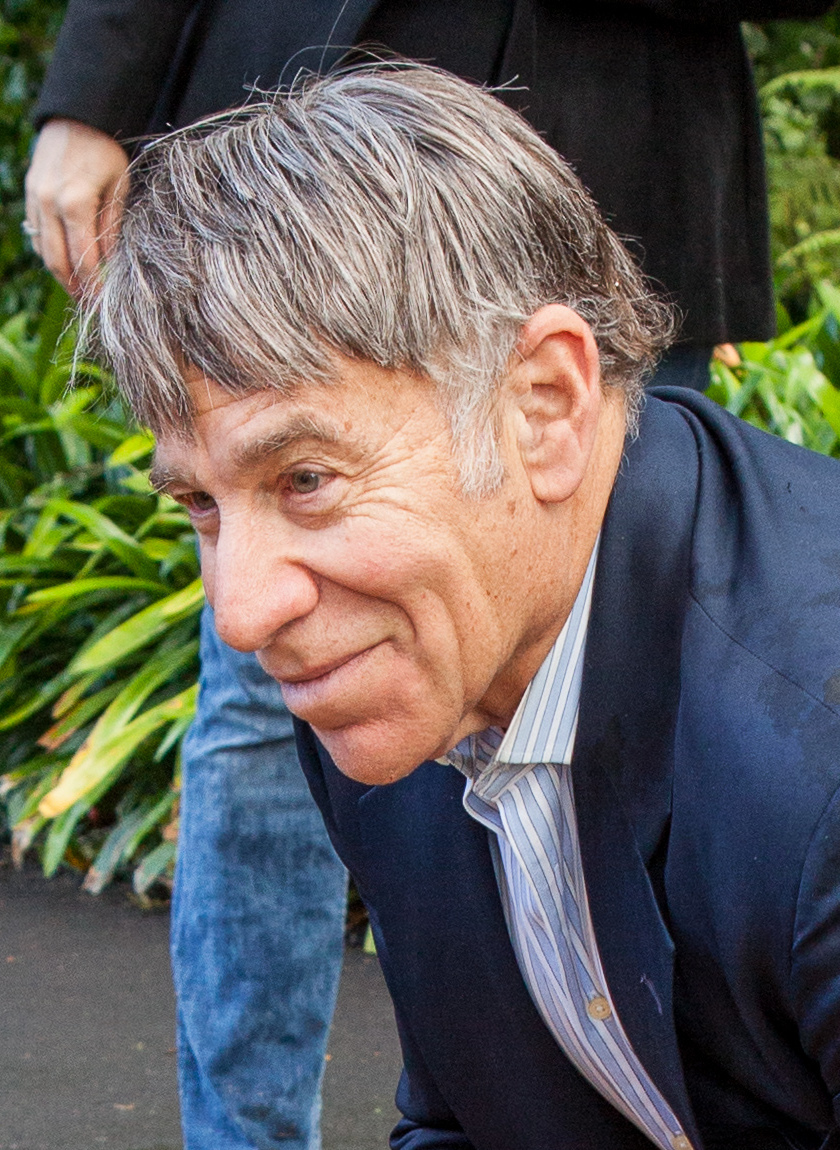
Stephen Schwartz, Best Original Song winner

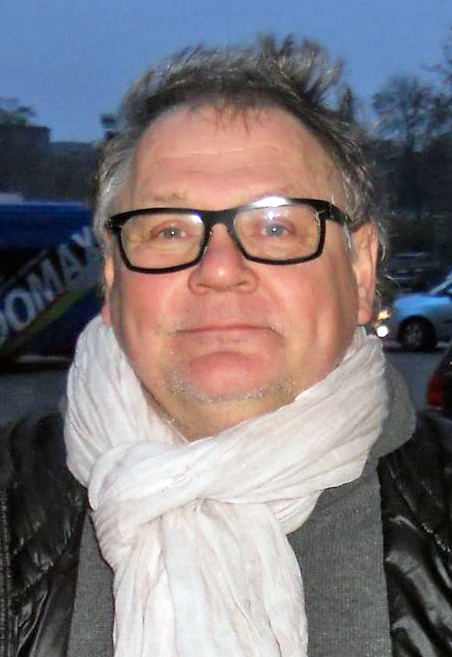
Janusz Kamiński, Best Cinematography winner

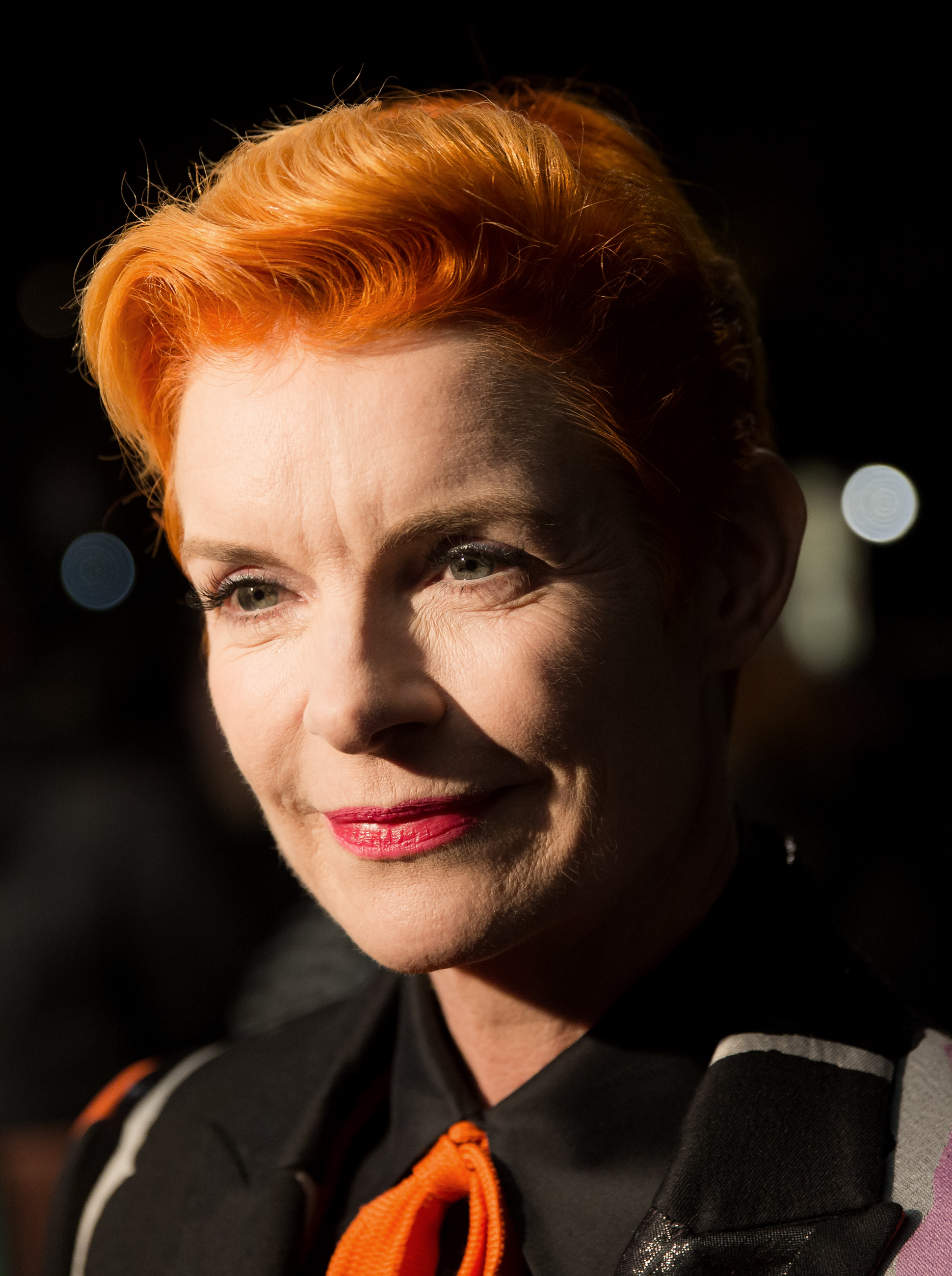
Sandy Powell, Best Costume Design winner

Winners are listed first, highlighted in boldface, and indicated with a double dagger (‡).

**Best Picture**: **Shakespeare in Love – David Parfitt, Donna Gigliotti, Harvey Weinstein, Edward Zwick and Marc Norman, producers**‡; Elizabeth – Alison Owen, Eric Fellner and Tim Bevan, producers; Life Is Beautiful – Elda Ferri and Gianluigi Braschi, producers; Saving Private Ryan – Steven Spielberg, Ian Bryce, Mark Gordon and Gary Levinsohn, producers; The Thin Red Line – Robert Michael Geisler, Grant Hill and John Roberdeau, producers	**Best Directing**: **Steven Spielberg – Saving Private Ryan**‡; Roberto Benigni – Life Is Beautiful; John Madden – Shakespeare in Love; Terrence Malick – The Thin Red Line; Peter Weir – The Truman Show
**Best Actor in a Leading Role**: **Roberto Benigni – Life Is Beautiful as Guido Orefice**‡; Tom Hanks – Saving Private Ryan as Captain John Miller; Ian McKellen – Gods and Monsters as James Whale; Nick Nolte – Affliction as Wade Whitehouse; Edward Norton – American History X as Derek Vinyard	**Best Actress in a Leading Role**: **Gwyneth Paltrow – Shakespeare in Love as Viola de Lesseps**‡; Cate Blanchett – Elizabeth as Queen Elizabeth I of England; Fernanda Montenegro – Central Station as Isadora "Dora" Teixeira; Meryl Streep – One True Thing as Kate Gulden; Emily Watson – Hilary and Jackie as Jacqueline du Pré
**Best Actor in a Supporting Role**: **James Coburn – Affliction as Glen Whitehouse**‡; Robert Duvall – A Civil Action as Jerome Facher; Ed Harris – The Truman Show as Christof; Geoffrey Rush – Shakespeare in Love as Philip Henslowe; Billy Bob Thornton – A Simple Plan as Jacob Mitchell	**Best Actress in a Supporting Role**: **Judi Dench – Shakespeare in Love as Queen Elizabeth I of England**‡; Kathy Bates – Primary Colors as Libby Holden; Brenda Blethyn – Little Voice as Mari Hoff; Rachel Griffiths – Hilary and Jackie as Hilary du Pré; Lynn Redgrave – Gods and Monsters as Hanna
**Best Writing (Screenplay Written Directly for the Screen)**: **Shakespeare in Love – Marc Norman and Tom Stoppard**‡; Bulworth – Screenplay by: Warren Beatty and Jeremy Pikser; Story by Warren Beatty; Life Is Beautiful – Vincenzo Cerami and Roberto Benigni; Saving Private Ryan – Robert Rodat; The Truman Show – Andrew Niccol	**Best Writing (Screenplay Based on Material Previously Produced or Published)**: **Gods and Monsters – Bill Condon based on the novel Father of Frankenstein by Christopher Bram**‡; Out of Sight – Scott Frank from the novel by Elmore Leonard; Primary Colors – Elaine May adapted from the novel by Joe Klein; A Simple Plan – Scott B. Smith based on his novel; The Thin Red Line – Terrence Malick adapted from the novel by James Jones
**Best Foreign Language Film**: **Life Is Beautiful (Italy) in Italian – Roberto Benigni**‡; Central Station (Brazil) in Portuguese – Walter Salles; Children of Heaven (Iran) in Persian – Majid Majidi; The Grandfather (Spain) in Spanish – José Luis Garci; Tango (Argentina) in Spanish – Carlos Saura	**Best Documentary (Feature)**: **The Last Days – James Moll and Ken Lipper**‡; Dancemaker – Matthew Diamond and Jerry Kupfer; The Farm: Angola, USA – Jonathan Stack and Liz Garbus; Lenny Bruce: Swear to Tell the Truth – Robert B. Weide; Regret to Inform – Barbara Sonneborn and Janet Cole
**Best Documentary (Short Subject)**: **The Personals: Improvisations on Romance in the Golden Years – Keiko Ibi**‡; A Place in the Land – Charles Guggenheim; Sunrise Over Tiananmen Square – Shui-Bo Wang and Donald McWilliams	**Best Short Film (Live Action)**: **Election Night – Kim Magnusson and Anders Thomas Jensen**‡; Culture – Will Speck and Josh Gordon; Holiday Romance – Alexander Jovy and JJ Keith; La Carte Postale – Vivian Goffette; Victor – Simon Sandquist and Joel Bergvall
**Best Short Film (Animated)**: **Bunny – Chris Wedge**‡; The Canterbury Tales – Christopher Grace and Jonathan Myerson; Jolly Roger – Mark Baker; More – Mark Osborne and Steve Kalafer; When Life Departs – Karsten Kiilerich and Stefan Fjeldmark	**Best Music (Original Dramatic Score)**: **Life Is Beautiful – Nicola Piovani**‡; Elizabeth – David Hirschfelder; Pleasantville – Randy Newman; Saving Private Ryan – John Williams; The Thin Red Line – Hans Zimmer
**Best Music (Original Musical or Comedy Score)**: **Shakespeare in Love – Stephen Warbeck**‡; A Bug's Life – Randy Newman; Mulan – Music by Matthew Wilder; Lyrics by David Zippel; Orchestral Score by Jerry Goldsmith; Patch Adams – Marc Shaiman; The Prince of Egypt – Music and Lyrics by Stephen Schwartz; Orchestral Score by Hans Zimmer	**Best Music (Original Song)**: **"When You Believe" from The Prince of Egypt – Music and Lyrics by Stephen Schwartz**‡; "I Don't Want to Miss a Thing" from Armageddon – Music and Lyrics by Diane Warren; "The Prayer" from Quest for Camelot – Music by Carole Bayer Sager and David Foster; Lyrics by Carole Bayer Sager, David Foster, Tony Renis and Alberto Testa; "A Soft Place to Fall" from The Horse Whisperer – Music and Lyrics by Allison Moorer and Gwil Owen; "That'll Do" from Babe: Pig in the City – Music and Lyrics by Randy Newman
**Best Sound**: **Saving Private Ryan – Gary Rydstrom, Gary Summers, Andy Nelson and Ron Judkins**‡; Armageddon – Kevin O'Connell, Greg P. Russell and Keith A. Wester; The Mask of Zorro – Kevin O'Connell, Greg P. Russell and Pud Cusack; Shakespeare in Love – Robin O'Donoghue, Dominic Lester and Peter Glossop; The Thin Red Line – Andy Nelson, Anna Behlmer and Paul Brincat	**Best Sound Effects Editing**: **Saving Private Ryan – Gary Rydstrom and Richard Hymns**‡; Armageddon – George Watters II; The Mask of Zorro – David McMoyler
**Best Art Direction**: **Shakespeare in Love – Art Direction: Martin Childs; Set Decoration: Jill Quertier**‡; Elizabeth – Art Direction: John Myhre; Set Decoration: Peter Howitt; Pleasantville – Art Direction: Jeannine Oppewall; Set Decoration: Jay Hart; Saving Private Ryan – Art Direction: Tom Sanders; Set Decoration: Lisa Dean Kavanaugh; What Dreams May Come – Art Direction: Eugenio Zanetti; Set Decoration: Cindy Carr	**Best Cinematography**: **Saving Private Ryan – Janusz Kamiński**‡; A Civil Action – Conrad Hall; Elizabeth – Remi Adefarasin; Shakespeare in Love – Richard Greatrex; The Thin Red Line – John Toll
**Best Makeup**: **Elizabeth – Jenny Shircore**‡; Saving Private Ryan – Lois Burwell, Conor O'Sullivan and Daniel C. Striepeke; Shakespeare in Love – Lisa Westcott and Veronica Brebner	**Best Costume Design**: **Shakespeare in Love – Sandy Powell**‡; Beloved – Colleen Atwood; Elizabeth – Alexandra Byrne; Pleasantville – Judianna Makovsky; Velvet Goldmine – Sandy Powell
**Best Film Editing**: **Saving Private Ryan – Michael Kahn**‡; Life Is Beautiful – Simona Paggi; Out of Sight – Anne V. Coates; Shakespeare in Love – David Gamble; The Thin Red Line – Billy Weber, Leslie Jones and Saar Klein	**Best Visual Effects**: **What Dreams May Come – Joel Hynek, Nicholas Brooks, Stuart Robertson and Kevin Mack**‡; Armageddon – Richard R. Hoover, Pat McClung and John Frazier; Mighty Joe Young – Rick Baker, Hoyt Yeatman, Allen Hall and Jim Mitchell

=== Honorary Award ===
- To Elia Kazan in recognition of his indelible contributions to the art of motion picture direction.

=== Irving G. Thalberg Memorial Award ===
- Norman Jewison

=== Films with multiple nominations and awards ===
The following 19 films received multiple nominations:

Nominations	Film
13	Shakespeare in Love
11	Saving Private Ryan
7	Elizabeth
7	Life Is Beautiful
7	The Thin Red Line
4	Armageddon
3	Gods and Monsters
3	Pleasantville
3	The Truman Show
2	Affliction
2	Central Station
2	A Civil Action
2	Hilary and Jackie
2	The Mask of Zorro
2	Out of Sight
2	Primary Colors
2	The Prince of Egypt
2	A Simple Plan
2	What Dreams May Come

The following three films received multiple awards:

Awards	Film
7	Shakespeare in Love
5	Saving Private Ryan
3	Life Is Beautiful

== Presenters and performers ==
The following individuals presented awards or performed musical numbers.

=== Presenters ===
Name(s)	Role
Randi Thomas	Announcer for the 71st annual Academy Awards
Robert Rehme (AMPAS President)	Gave opening remarks welcoming guests to the awards ceremony
Kim Basinger	Presenter of the award for Best Supporting Actor
Gwyneth Paltrow	Presenter of the award for Best Art Direction
Patrick Stewart	Presenter of the films Elizabeth and Shakespeare in Love on the Best Picture segment
Mike Myers	Presenter of the award for Best Makeup
Christina Ricci	Introducer of the performance of Best Song nominee "When You Believe"
Brendan Fraser	Presenter of the award for Best Live Action Short Film
Flik; Heimlich	Presenters of the award for Best Animated Short Film
Robin Williams	Presenter of the award for Best Supporting Actress
Chris Rock	Presenter of the award for Best Sound Effects Editing
Liv Tyler	Introducer of the performance of Best Song nominee "I Don't Want to Miss a Thing"
Anjelica Huston	Presenter of the award for Best Sound
Tom Hanks	Introducer of presenter John Glenn
John Glenn	Presenter of the "Historical Figures in Cinema" montage
Sophia Loren	Presenter of the film Life Is Beautiful on the Best Picture segment and the award for Best Foreign Language Film
Andy García; Andie MacDowell	Presenters of the award for Best Original Musical or Comedy Score
Geena Davis	Introducer of the special dance number to the tune of the Best Original Dramatic Score nominees and presenter of the award for Best Original Dramatic Score
John Travolta	Presenter of the Frank Sinatra tribute montage
Anne Heche	Presenter of the segment of the Academy Awards for Technical Achievement and the Gordon E. Sawyer Award
Jim Carrey	Presenter of the award for Best Film Editing
Renée Zellweger	Introducer of the performance of the Best Song nominee "A Soft Place to Fall"
Nicolas Cage	Presenter of the Irving G. Thalberg Memorial Award to Norman Jewison
Liam Neeson	Presenter of the award for Best Visual Effects
Val Kilmer	Presenter of the Gene Autry and Roy Rogers tribute montage
Helen Hunt	Presenter of the award for Best Actor
Lisa Kudrow	Introducer of the performance of Best Song nominee "That'll Do"
Ben Affleck; Matt Damon	Presenters of the awards for Best Documentary Short Subject and Best Documentary Feature
Robert De Niro; Martin Scorsese	Presenters of the Honorary Academy Award to Elia Kazan
Whoopi Goldberg	Presenter of the award for Best Costume Design
Catherine Zeta-Jones	Introducer of the performance of Best Song nominee "The Prayer"
Jennifer Lopez	Presenter of the award for Best Original Song
Annette Bening	Presenter of the "In Memoriam" tribute
Jack Valenti	Introducer of presenter Colin Powell
Colin Powell	Presenter of the films Saving Private Ryan and The Thin Red Line on the Best Picture segment
Uma Thurman	Presenter of the award for Best Cinematography
Jack Nicholson	Presenter of the award for Best Actress
Steven Spielberg	Presenter of the Stanley Kubrick tribute montage
Goldie Hawn; Steve Martin	Presenters of the awards for Best Screenplay Written Directly for the Screen and Best Screenplay Based on Material Previously Produced or Published
Kevin Costner	Presenter of the award for Best Director
Harrison Ford	Presenter of the award for Best Picture

=== Performers ===
Name(s)	Role	Performed
Bill Conti	Musical arranger	Orchestral
Mariah Carey; Whitney Houston	Performers	"When You Believe" from The Prince of Egypt
Aerosmith	Performers	"I Don't Want to Miss a Thing" from Armageddon
Joaquín Cortés; Savion Glover; Tai Jiminez; Desmond Richardson; Rasta Thomas	Performers	Performed dance number synchronized with selections from Best Original Dramatic Score nominees
Allison Moorer	Performer	"A Soft Place to Fall" from The Horse Whisperer
Peter Gabriel; Randy Newman	Performers	"That'll Do" from Babe: Pig in the City
Celine Dion; Andrea Bocelli	Performers	"The Prayer" from Quest for Camelot

== Ceremony information ==
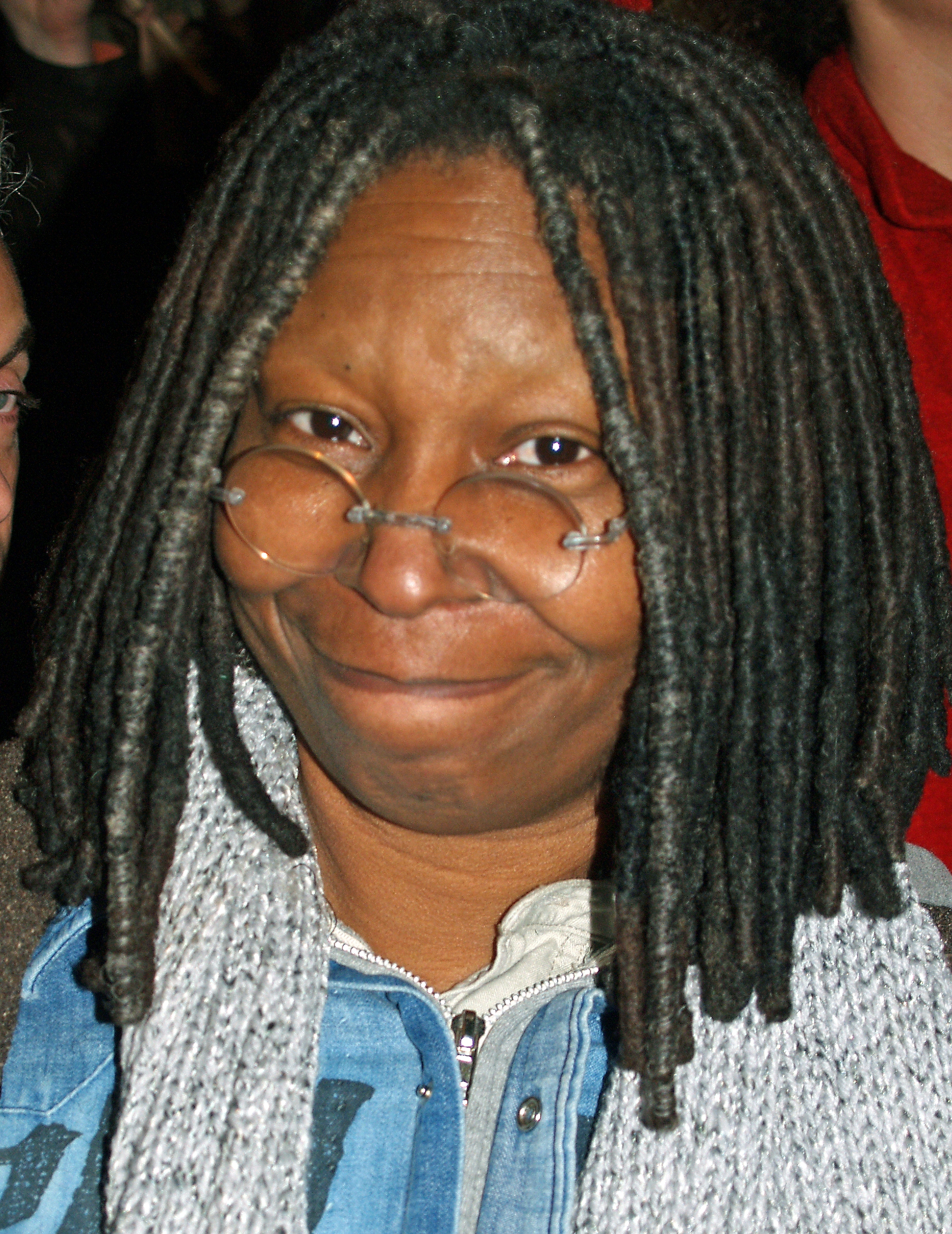
Whoopi Goldberg hosted the 71st Academy Awards

Riding on the success of the previous year's ceremony which garnered record-high viewership figures and several Emmys, AMPAS sought changes to the festivities that would help build upon this recent success. In June 1998, Academy president Robert Rehme announced that the show would be held on a Sunday for the first time in history. AMPAS and network ABC hoped to capitalize on the high television ratings and viewership that benefit programs airing on that particular day of the week. The Academy also stated that the move to Sunday would ease concerns about traffic gridlock and transportation that are significantly lower on weekends. Additionally, AMPAS decided to continue producing the ceremony and presenting a finished feed to ABC, instead of entrusting production to the network, similarly as last year.

The following January, Gil Cates was selected as a producer of the telecast. He immediately selected Oscar-winning actress Whoopi Goldberg as host of the 1999 ceremony. Cates explained his decision to bring back Goldberg as host saying, "The audience adores Whoopi and that affection, plus Whoopi's extraordinary talent makes her a terrific host for the show." In a statement, Goldberg expressed that she was honored and excited to be selected to emcee the telecast commenting, "I am thrilled to escort Oscar into the new millennium. Who would have thought that I would be hosting the last Oscar telecast of the century? It's a huge deal."

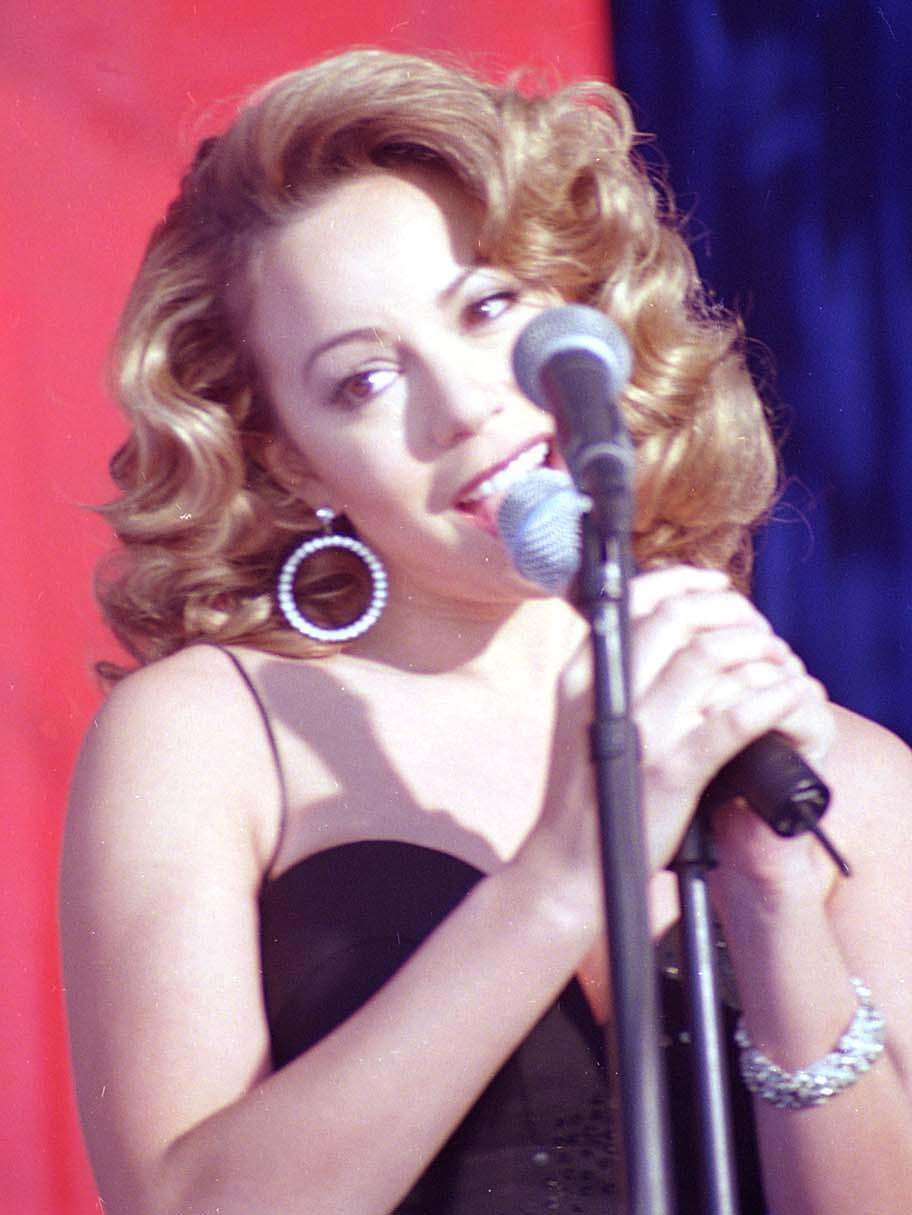
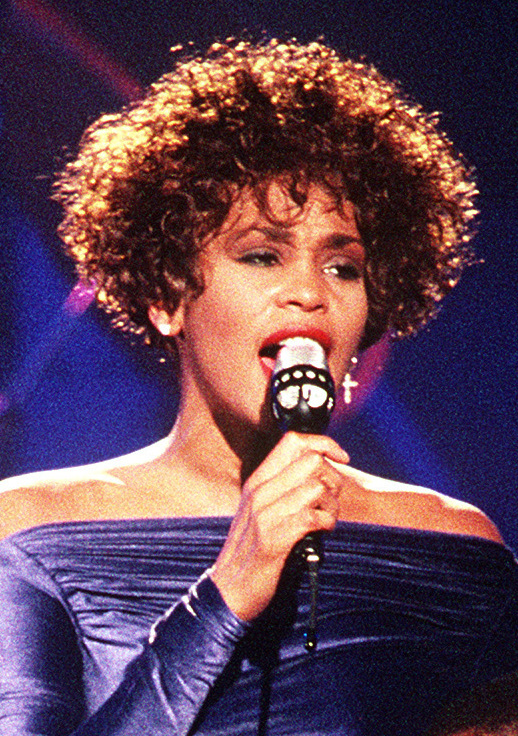
Mariah Carey (left) and Whitney Houston (right) performed "When You Believe", which went on to win the Academy Award for Best Original Song

Several other people participated in the production of the ceremony and its related events. Bill Conti served as musical director for the festivities. In addition to supervising the Best Song nominee performances, choreographer Debbie Allen produced a dance number featuring five dancers from around the world showcasing the nominees for Best Original Dramatic Score. For the first time, the Academy produced its own pre-show that preceded the main telecast. Produced by Dennis Doty, the half-hour program was hosted by actress Geena Davis and CNN reporter Jim Moret. Similar to coverage of red carpet arrivals on networks such as E!, the pre-show featured interviews with nominees and other guests, recaps of nominations and segments highlighting behind-the-scenes preparations for the telecast.

=== Box office performance of nominees ===
At the time of the nominations announcement on February 9, the combined gross of the five Best Picture nominees was $302 million with an average of $60.4 million per film. Saving Private Ryan was the highest earner among the Best Picture nominees with $194.2 million in domestic box office receipts. The film was followed by Shakespeare in Love ($36.5 million), The Thin Red Line ($30.6 million), Elizabeth ($21.5 million), and finally Life is Beautiful ($18.4 million).

Of the top 50 grossing movies of the year, 36 nominations went to 13 films on the list. Only Saving Private Ryan (2nd), The Truman Show (11th), A Civil Action (40th) and Primary Colors (50th) were nominated for Best Picture, directing, acting or screenwriting. The other top 50 box office hits that earned nominations were Armageddon (1st), A Bug's Life (5th), Patch Adams (12th), Mulan (13th), The Mask of Zorro (17th), The Prince of Egypt (18th), The Horse Whisperer (24th), What Dreams May Come (37th) and Pleasantville (49th).

=== Critical reviews ===
The show received a mixed reception from media publications. Columnist Lisa Schwarzbaum of Entertainment Weekly quipped that "Whoopi bombed last night, she knew it—and yet, crassly, she took it as a sign of her own outrageousness." The Washington Post television critic Tom Shales bemoaned that Goldberg "spent a great deal of time laughing at her own jokes, many of which were dirty, a few dirty." He also lambasted the host's presentation of the five Best Costume Design nominees calling it time-consuming and tasteless. Film critic John Hartl of The Seattle Times lamented that the telecast "was the longest and possibly the dullest Oscar show of the century, clocking in at four hours."

Other media outlets received the broadcast more positively. Television columnist Robert Bianco of USA Today commended Goldberg's hosting performance writing that he liked "the sharper, more socially conscious edge Goldberg brings." The Boston Globe television critic Matthew Gilbert commented, "It was the perfect year with more than enough Hollywood intrigue and a battle for her to play off." Joanne Ostrow of The Denver Post raved that "Whoopi definitely was on, more so than in her two previous hosting stints." She added that "the show was exceptionally smooth."

=== Ratings and reception ===
The American telecast on ABC drew an average of 45.51 million viewers over its length, which was an 18% decrease from the previous year's ceremony. An estimated 78.10 million total viewers watched all or part of the awards. The show also drew lower Nielsen ratings compared to the previous ceremony with 28.63% of households watching over a 47.79 share. It also drew a lower 18–49 demo rating with an 18.85 rating over a 37.31 share among viewers in that demographic.

In July 1999, the show received seven nominations at the 51st Primetime Emmy Awards. Two months later, the ceremony won two of those nominations for Outstanding Art Direction for a Variety or Music Program (Roy Christopher and Stephen Olson) and Outstanding Lighting Direction for a Drama Series, Variety Series, Miniseries, Movie, or Special (Robert Dickinson, Robert T. Barnhart, Andy O'Reilly, Matt Ford).

== "In Memoriam" ==
The annual "In Memoriam" tribute was presented by actress Annette Bening. The montage featured an excerpt of the main title from Ever After composed by George Fenton.

- Dane Clark – Character actor
- Linwood G. Dunn – Special Effects
- George W. Davis – Art Director
- Dick O'Neill – Actor
- Charles Lang – Cinematographer
- Norman Fell – Actor
- James Goldman – Screenwriter
- Vincent Winter – Child actor
- Freddie Young – Cinematographer
- John P. Veitch – Executive
- E. G. Marshall – Actor
- Jeanette Nolan – Actress
- Alan J. Pakula – Writer/Director/Producer
- Jerome Robbins – Director/Choreographer
- Susan Strasberg – Actress
- John Derek – Actor
- John Addison – Composer
- Jean Marais – Actor
- Richard Kiley – Actor
- Maureen O'Sullivan – Actress
- Phil Hartman – Actor/comedian
- Esther Rolle – Actress
- Gene Raymond – Actor
- Binnie Barnes – Actress
- Valerie Hobson – Actress
- Huntz Hall – Child actor
- Akira Kurosawa – Director
- Alice Faye – Actress/singer
- Robert Young – Actor
- Roddy McDowall – Actor

A separate tribute to actor, singer and former Oscar host Frank Sinatra was presented by John Travolta. Later, actor Val Kilmer presented one to actors Gene Autry and Roy Rogers. After the In Memoriam segment was shown, host Goldberg and director Steven Spielberg eulogized film critic Gene Siskel and director Stanley Kubrick respectively.

== See also ==
- 5th Screen Actors Guild Awards
- 19th Golden Raspberry Awards
- 41st Grammy Awards
- 51st Primetime Emmy Awards
- 52nd British Academy Film Awards
- 53rd Tony Awards
- 56th Golden Globe Awards
- List of submissions to the 71st Academy Awards for Best Foreign Language Film

== Bibliography ==
- Bona, Damien (2002), Inside Oscar 2, New York, United States: Ballantine Books, ISBN 0-345-44970-3
- Kinn, Gail; Piazza, Jim (2002), The Academy Awards: The Complete Unofficial History, New York, United States: Workman Publishing Company, ISBN 978-1579123963
- Osborne, Robert (2013). 85 Years of the Oscar: The Complete History of the Academy Awards. New York, United States: Abbeville Publishing Group. ISBN 978-0-7892-1142-2.
- Pond, Steve (2005), The Big Show: High Times and Dirty Dealings Backstage at the Academy Awards, New York, United States: Faber and Faber, ISBN 0-571-21193-3
