= Beside You (New York Rock and Roll Ensemble song) =

Song by New York Rock & Roll Ensemble

from the album Roll Over
- Released: 1971
- Length: 3:43
- Label: Columbia Records
- Songwriter(s): Michael Kamen & Mark Snow

"Beside You" is a song written by Michael Kamen and Mark Snow and released on New York Rock & Roll Ensemble's fourth album Roll Over in 1971.

When Kamen was asked to compose a soundtrack for Vincent Ward's 1998 film What Dreams May Come on an accelerated time scale after the original score was rejected, he adapted "Beside You", and used it as the basis for the score. The album for the score included a cover of the song with Simply Red's Mick Hucknall providing vocals, which was later included on Simply Red's 2010 Songs of Love compilation album.
