= Tavriiske =

Tavriiske is the name of several small settlements in Ukraine:

- Tavriiske, Zaporizhzhia Raion, Zaporizhzhia Oblast
- Tavriiske, Kherson Raion, Kherson Oblast

== See also ==
- Tavriiske rural hromada
