= Reflections (Manos Hatzidakis album) =

Studio album by New York Rock & Roll Ensemble
- Released: 1970
- Recorded: 1970
- Studio: Atlantic Recording Studios, New York City
- Genre: Rock
- Length: 34:54
- Label: Atco
- Producer: Manos Hadjidakis, Adrian Barber, Bruce Tergesen

New York Rock & Roll Ensemble chronology
Faithful Friends (1969)	Reflections (1970)	Zachariah (1970)

Professional ratings
Review scores
Source	Rating
Allmusic	3/5 stars

Reflections is a 1970 album composed by Manos Hatzidakis and performed by New York Rock & Roll Ensemble.

The album was originally composed in New York City where Manos Hatzidakis was living since 1966. The lyrics are in English.

In 1993 the album was re-released with new lyrics in Greek, which were written by Nikos Gatsos and performed by Aliki Kagialoglou.

In 2005 an adaptation of the album by the Greek band Raining Pleasure was released.

== Track listing ==
All music is composed by Manos Hadjidakis.

No.	Title	Writer(s)	Length
1.	"Orpheus"	Dorian Rudnytsky	2:36
2.	"The Day"	Brian Corrigan	4:23
3.	"Love Her"	Corrigan	4:52
4.	"Dance of the Dogs"	instrumental	3:25
5.	"Kemal"	Martin Fulterman	4:07
6.	"Dedication"	Clifton Nivison	2:50
7.	"The Three Answers"	instrumental	3:51
8.	"Street Song"	Corrigan	3:48
9.	"Bitter Way"	Corrigan	4:37
10.	"Noble Dame"	Rudnytsky	3:12
Total length:			34:54

== Personnel ==
- Clifton Nevison – lead guitar, vocals; lead vocals on "Love Her", "Kemal" and "Street Song"
- Brian Corrigan – rhythm guitar, vocals; lead vocals on "The Day" and "Better Way"
- Michael Kamen – keyboards, oboe, vocals; lead vocals on "Dedication" and "Noble Dame"
- Dorian Rudnytsky – bass, cello, vocals; lead vocals on "Orpheus"
- Martin Fulterman – drums, oboe, vocals
