= 1998 Academy Awards =

1998 Academy Awards may refer to:

- 70th Academy Awards, the Academy Awards ceremony for 1997 films that took place on March 23, 1998
- 71st Academy Awards, the Academy Awards ceremony honoring the best films of 1998
