= Maria Sokil =

Ukrainian opera singer

- Марія Сокіл
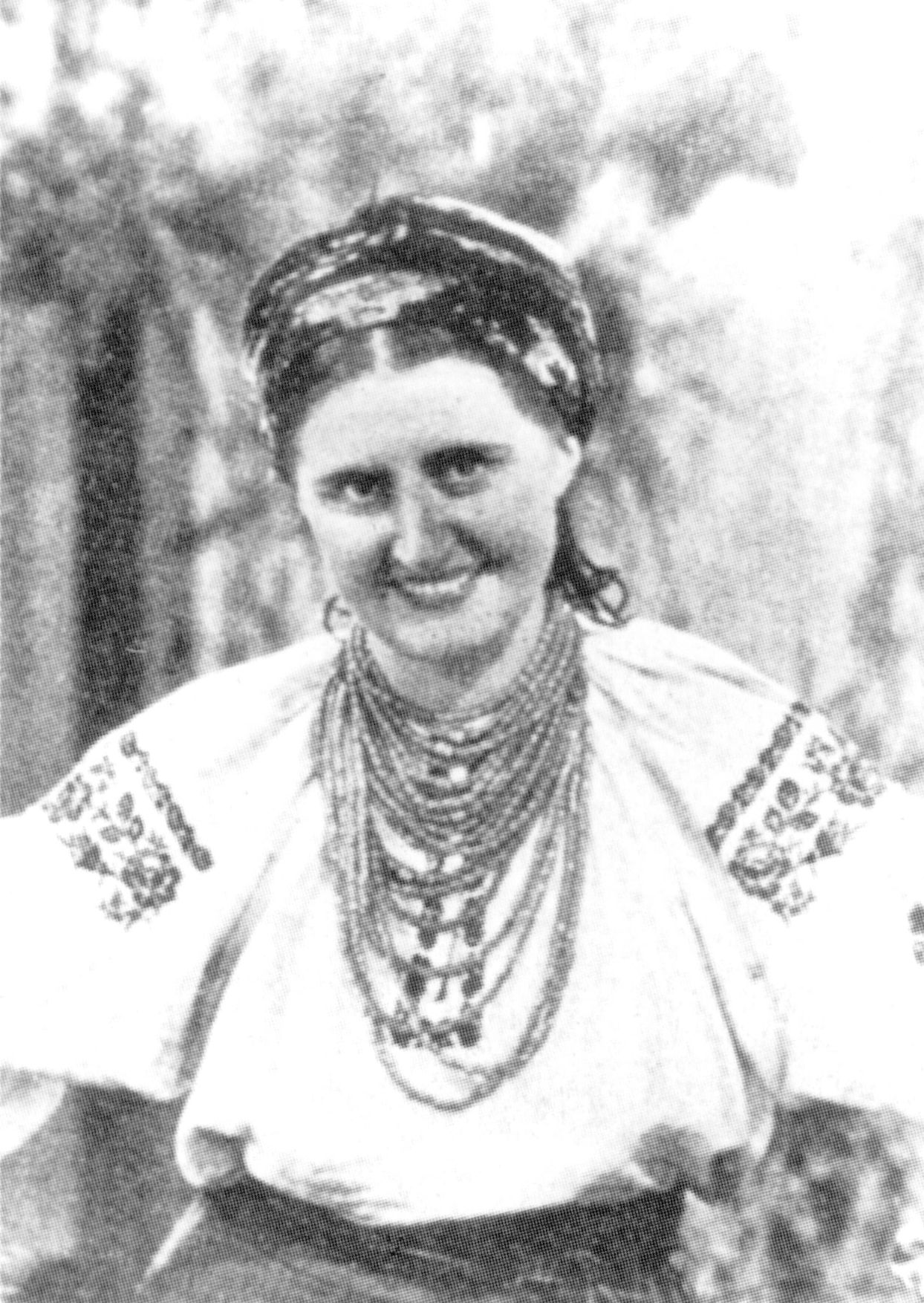
- Sokil c. 1938 for Cossacks in Exile
- Born: Mariia Ivanivna Sokil; October 18, 1902; Zherebets, Russian Empire (now Tavriiske, Ukraine)
- Died: January 20, 1999 (aged 96); Youngstown, Ohio
- Other name: Maria Rudnytsky
- Occupation: Opera singer
- Children: Dorian Rudnytsky

Maria Ivanivna Sokil (Note: Ukrainian: Марія Іванівна Сокіл, romanized: Mariia Ivanivna Sokil Married name: Ukrainian: Марія Іванівна Рудницька, romanized: Mariia Ivanivna Rudnytska) (also known as Maria Rudnytsky; October 18, 1902 – January 20, 1999) was a Ukrainian opera singer. She was married to Ukrainian composer Antin Rudnytsky and is the mother of Ukrainian-American musicians Roman Rudnytsky and Dorian Rudnytsky.

== Early life and education ==
Sokil was born in the village of Zherebets' (now Tavriiske) in the Zaporizhzhia Oblast on October 18, 1902. Her father was a high school teacher. She studied at the conservatory in Dnipro from 1920 to 1925. She later studied in Italy, France, and Germany.

== Musical career ==
She made her opera debut in Kharkiv in 1927 in the role of Marguerite in Gounod's opera Faust and became the prima donna lyric soprano of that opera theater. In 1929, she and bass Ivan Patorzhynsky, representative singer from Ukraine, went on a concert tour to Germany and Italy.

Maria remained in Kharkiv until 1930; later, she joined the Kyiv Opera (1930–1932). While in Kharkiv for a concert in 1929, she met Antin Rudnytsky, whom she married in 1931. Rudnytsky was a composer, conductor, and pianist from Lviv, and he had recently been named an orchestra conductor in Kharkiv. Later, in 1932, Maria Sokil performed at the Lviv Opera and Ballet Theater and, with her husband, toured a number of countries in Eastern and Central Europe for the next several years. They had concert tours in the United States and Canada in 1937 and then again in 1938–1939. After World War II broke out, Maria and Antin remained in the United States.

In 1938, Sokil won the leading role, Odarka, in the Ukranian-language motion picture Cossacks in Exile (based on the opera Zaporozhets za Dunayem), made in New Jersey while she was on tour. The filming ended by September 1938. A film critic said her singing was "poignant" but she was "less capable" when it came to her humorous scenes opposite her on-screen husband Michael Shvetz.

Maria Sokil and her husband subsequently continued their musical activities in several different ways for many years in the United States. She had success with the roles of Desdemona (Verdi's Otello), Mimi (Puccini's La Bohème), Liu (Puccini's Turandot), Elsa (Richard Wagner's Lohengrin), Tatiana (Tchaikovsky's Eugene Onegin), Lisa (Tchaikovsky's The Queen of Spades), and Natalka (Lysenko's Natalka Poltavka).

In 1958, Maria became a lecturer at the Philadelphia Music Academy and the Philadelphia Music Conservatory.

== Personal life ==
Maria married Antin Rudnytsky (1902–1975), a Ukrainian composer, in 1931. They moved to the United States in 1938, living in Toms River and South Bound Brook in New Jersey. The couple had two children, Roman Rudnytsky (born 1942) and Dorian Rudnytsky (born 1944). Maria and Antin raised their sons in a musical household. Roman is a pianist and Dorian is a cellist and composer. Their grandchildren include Tara Palmer (née Rudnytsky), Evan Rudnytsky, Oksana McStowe (née Rudnytsky), and Damian Rudnytsky.

In 1987, Maria's brother Wolodymur Sokil, whom she had not seen since 1932 in the Soviet Union, arrived in the United States. In 1995, Maria moved to Ohio from New Jersey. She died on January 20, 1999, in Youngstown, Ohio, at the age of 96. Her funeral was held by the St. Andrew's Ukrainian Orthodox Church in South Bound Brook.
