= 1999 Academy Awards =

1999 Academy Awards may refer to:

- 71st Academy Awards, the Academy Awards ceremony that took place in 1999
- 72nd Academy Awards, the 2000 ceremony honoring the best in film for 1999
