= Nicholas Brooks (special effects artist) =

British visual effects artist

- Born: 20 May 1964 (age 62); London, England, UK
- Other name: Nick Brooks
- Occupation: Visual effects artist
- Years active: 1990-present

Nicholas Brooks (born 20 May 1964) is a British visual effects artist. He won at the 71st Academy Awards in the category of Best Visual Effects for his work on What Dreams May Come. He shared his Academy Award with Joel Hynek, Kevin Mack and Stuart Robertson.

He also won an Emmy Award for the special effects of the TV film Dreamkeeper.

With his wife Laura Kelly, Brooks has directed various music videos and commercials under the collective Honey, including "Guerrilla Radio" by Rage Against the Machine.

== Selected filmography ==
- It Chapter Two (2019)
- It (2017)
- Lucy (2014)
- Now You See Me (2013)
- This is the End (2013)
- Elysium (2013)
- Immortals (2011)
- The Girl with the Dragon Tattoo (2011)
- The Twilight Saga: Eclipse (2010)
- Mr. & Mrs. Smith (2005)
- Constantine (2005)
- Eraser (1996)
- Blade II (2002)
- Fight Club (1999)
- The Matrix (1999) (uncredited)
- What Dreams May Come (1998)
- Judge Dredd (1995)
- Frankenstein (1994) (credited as Nick Brooks)
- The Secret Garden (1993) (uncredited)
- The Muppet Christmas Carol (1992) (credited as Nick Brooks)
- 1492: Conquest of Paradise (1992) (credited as Nick Brooks)
- The Fisher King (1991)
- Memphis Belle (1990)
