= Saxophone Concerto (Kamen) =

1989 concerto by Michael Kamen

The Concerto for Saxophone is a 1989 composition for solo alto saxophone and orchestra written by the American composer Michael Kamen for the saxophonist David Sanborn, to whom it is dedicated. The work is cast in three numbered movements and has a performance duration of roughly 28 minutes.

== History ==
Kamen composed the concerto in 1989 for his friend and longtime collaborator David Sanborn, with whom he had worked on numerous film scores. Kamen produced a premiere recording of the piece, performed by Sanborn and the National Philharmonic Orchestra conducted by the composer, which was released through Warner Bros. Records in 1990.

Despite being released on album, the score to the concerto remained unpublished until long after Kamen's death in 2003. In the early 2010s, however, the Australian saxophonist Amy Dickson became interested in performing the work and contacted the composer's daughter, who located the original handwritten manuscript. After checking the manuscript against the original recording for discrepancies and consulting with Sanborn himself, Dickson was able to reconstruct the work for performance. A second recording of the concerto, performed by Dickson and the Melbourne Symphony Orchestra conducted by Benjamin Northey, was released through ABC Music in 2013.

The piece has since been transcribed for alto saxophone and concert band.

== Reception ==
Reviewing the original album, the jazz critic Don Heckman of the Los Angeles Times was dismissive of the work, describing it as "a murky, three-movement tour through a series of orchestrated film music settings." He added, "Little of any technical significance is demanded of soloist Sanborn, who plays, nonetheless, with a warmer, less-pinched tone than is often the case on his own recordings."

However, Steve Arloff of MusicWeb International described the work as "rich, full blooded and lush in every respect." He elaborated:

Opening with the lower strings in their deepest register the concerto emerges from darkness into light with the saxophone leading the orchestra into a wonderfully expansive and tuneful main theme with the brass section playing a significant role. The saxophone’s contribution is extremely lyrical in the same way a flute would be with a comparably playful aspect about it as it soars above the rest. This first movement is full of drama with some moments that would easily accompany a film. The second is much more reflective tinged with regret with a generally sad feeling to it and with passages of an ethereal beauty. The final movement recalls themes from the other two and merges the two moods. It ends in an uplifting mood.
