= Gioconda's Smile =

Studio album by Manos Hadjidakis
- Released: 1965
- Recorded: April 1965 at New York
- Genre: Orchestral, classical
- Length: 31:24
- Label: Fontana, EMI
- Producer: Quincy Jones

Manos Hadjidakis chronology
| Blood Wedding / A Tale Without Name (1965) | Gioconda's Smile (1965) | Birds (1965) |

Gioconda's Smile (Greek: Το Χαμόγελο της Τζοκόντας) is one of the most famous albums by Greek composer Manos Hadjidakis. It is considered one of the classic albums of 20th-century music in Greece.

The album was recorded in New York in 1965, with Quincy Jones as producer. It was first released in USA in 1965 with twelve orchestral songs, and that same year in Greece, but "The Athletes" and "The Soldier" were not included.

The album was re-released in 2004, as part of the EMI Classics series.

The album was re-released with a variety of covers. Except for the first version, which was released in USA, all of the covers featured Mona Lisa. The cover (inspired and executed by Marianna Xenaki) and, most notably, the title of the album are explained by Manos Hadjidakis in the introductory note he wrote for the album:

In the course of a New York City parade, amidst bursts of music and colours and 5th Avenue flooded with people, I found myself one Sunday afternoon in the autumn of 1963. Then and there, I met a little woman walking all alone with a desperate indifference to what was happening around her; nobody noticed her, she noticed nobody; she was desolately alone in the unknown crowd shoving her, passing her by, heedless and hostile, leaving her to drown in the deep flood of the Avenue, inside that sea she was following, inside the wind beginning to blow.

I was riveted there, the only human being who noticed her. I tried to trail after her and follow her till I could get close enough to talk to her, without my knowing what I would say to her; but by the time I'd made up my mind, I'd lost sight of her. I ran a little way ahead, stood on tiptoe in hopes of catching sight of her again, but the big black sea of people had swallowed her up. Inside me something started throbbing painfully. Without realising it, I'd come to a stop outside Rizzoli's Bookshop and in the display window, exactly facing me, was a book about da Vinci with the Gioconda on the cover. Incredibly enigmatic, she smiled to me, automatically enlarged to the size of the woman who'd just disappeared down the street.

I don't know why all these elements became strangely tangled inside myself, together with an exquisite motif by Vivaldi, which I had heard several days before this and which had continued ever since plaguing my memory tyranically.

These ten songs were composed with a blend of despair and reminiscences. The theme is a solitary woman in the big city. Each song is a monologue of hers and all the songs together compose her story. A story which is modern and, yet at the same time, old.

== Track listing ==
All tracks are written by Manos Hadjidakis.

| No. | Title | Length |
|---|---|---|
| 1. | "When The Clouds Come (Greek: Όταν Έρχονται Τα Σύννεφα)" | 2:28 |
| 2. | "The Soldier (Greek: Ο Στρατιώτης)" (Not included in the Greek release) | 2:26 |
| 3. | "The Virgin In My Neighborhood (Greek: Η Παρθένα της Γειτονιάς Μου)" | 2:59 |
| 4. | "Countess Esterhazy (Greek: Κοντέσα Εστερχάζυ)" | 2:55 |
| 5. | "Rain (Greek: Βροχή)" | 2:21 |
| 6. | "The Athletes (Greek: Οι Αθλητές)" (Not included in the Greek release) | 2:17 |
| 7. | "The Concerto (Greek: Το Κοντσέρτο)" | 3:38 |
| 8. | "Mr. Knoll (Greek: Ο κ. Νολλ)" | 3:21 |
| 9. | "Portrait Of My Mother (Greek: Προσωπογραφία Της Μητέρας Μου)" | 2:59 |
| 10. | "The Assassins (Greek: Οι Δολοφόνοι)" | 1:59 |
| 11. | "Returning In The Evening (Greek: Βραδυνή Επιστροφή)" | 2:40 |
| 12. | "Dance With My Shadow (Greek: Χορός Με Τη Σκιά Μου)" | 3:24 |
