= Joel Hynek =

American visual effects artist

- Other names: Joel C. Hynek; Joel Hyneck
- Occupation: Visual effects artist
- Years active: 1980–present
- Parent: J. Allen Hynek

Joel Hynek is an American visual effects artist who has worked on over 30 films since 1980.

== Recognition ==
Oscar-nominations in the category of Best Visual Effects

- 60th Academy Awards-Predator. Nomination shared with Richard Greenberg, Robert M. Greenberg and Stan Winston. Lost to Innerspace.
- 71st Academy Awards-What Dreams May Come. Shared with Nicholas Brooks, Kevin Mack and Stuart Robertson. Won.

Oscar award in the category of Scientific and Engineering

- 1987. Shared with Robert M. Greenberg (R/Greenberg Associates, Inc.), Eugene Mamut (R/Greenberg Associates, Inc.), Alfred Thumim (Oxberry Division of Richmark Camera Service, Inc.), Elan Lipshitz (Oxberry Division of Richmark Camera Service, Inc.), Darryl A. Armour (Oxberry Division of Richmark Camera Service, Inc.) For the design and development of the RGA/Oxberry Compu-Quad Special Effects Optical Printer.

== Popular culture ==
Joel is portrayed as a child on the History Channel's Project Blue Book show, which depicts the work and research of his father Dr. J. Allen Hynek.
