= What Dreams May Come (film) =

- Theatrical release poster
- Directed by: Vincent Ward
- Screenplay by: Ronald Bass
- Based on: What Dreams May Come by Richard Matheson
- Produced by: Stephen Deutsch; Barnet Bain
- Starring: Robin Williams; Cuba Gooding Jr.; Annabella Sciorra; Max von Sydow
- Cinematography: Eduardo Serra
- Edited by: David Brenner; Maysie Hoy
- Music by: Michael Kamen
- Production company: Interscope Communications
- Distributed by: PolyGram Filmed Entertainment
- Release date: October 2, 1998
- Running time: 113 minutes
- Country: United States
- Language: English
- Budget: $85‒90 million
- Box office: $75.4 million

What Dreams May Come is a 1998 American fantasy drama film directed by Vincent Ward and adapted by Ronald Bass from the 1978 novel by Richard Matheson. Starring Robin Williams, Annabella Sciorra, and Cuba Gooding Jr., it won the Academy Award for Best Visual Effects and the Art Directors Guild Award for Excellence in Production Design. It was also nominated for the Academy Award for Best Art Direction. The title is from a line in Hamlet's "To be, or not to be" soliloquy. The film was released by PolyGram Filmed Entertainment on October 2, 1998, and received mixed reviews, with praise for its scenery but criticism for the plot. It was a box-office bomb, grossing only $75.4 million against a budget of $85‒90 million.

== Plot ==
While vacationing in Switzerland, pediatrician Chris Nielsen meets artist Annie Collins. They marry and have two children, Ian and Marie. Their idyllic life ends when the children die in a car crash. Four years later, Chris is also killed in a car crash. Unaware that he is dead, and confused that no one will interact with him, Chris lingers on Earth as a ghost.

Chris sees Annie's attempts to cope with his loss and attempts to communicate with her, despite advice from a presence that this will cause her only more pain. When his attempts indeed cause more sorrow, he decides to move on. Chris awakens in a Heaven that he has created with his imagination; his surroundings are mountainous landscapes that resemble a painting created by his wife and are similar to a place where the two desired to spend their old age.

Chris is accompanied in Heaven by Albert Lewis, his friend and mentor from his medical residency, and Leona, a stewardess whom Chris had once admired in the presence of his daughter; he later comes to recognize Leona as his daughter Marie. Meanwhile, Annie is wracked with guilt for the deaths of Chris and their children and dies by suicide. Chris, who is initially relieved that her suffering is over, grows angry when he learns that those who die by suicide go to Hell. It is not the result of a judgment made against them, but rather their own tendency to create nightmare afterlife worlds based on their pain.

Chris is adamant that he will rescue Annie from Hell, despite Albert's insistence that no one has ever succeeded in doing so with someone who died by suicide. Aided by a "tracker", Chris and Albert descend into Hell. On the journey there, Chris realizes that Albert is actually Ian and parts ways with him before his search for Annie.

Chris and the tracker arrive at a dark and twisted version of Chris and Annie's house. The tracker reveals himself as the real Albert and warns Chris that if he stays with Annie for more than a few minutes, he may be permanently trapped in Hell, advising that all Chris can reasonably expect is an opportunity for a final farewell to Annie. Chris enters their horrific-looking home to find Annie suffering from amnesia, unable to remember her suicide and visibly tortured by her decrepit surroundings. Unable to stir her memories, the tracker sees Chris give up his quest to save Annie from Hell.

Instead of returning to Heaven, Chris chooses to join Annie forever in Hell. As he declares to Annie his intent to stay, his words parallel something that he had said to her as he left her in an institution following the children's deaths, and she regains her memories while Chris is making her nightmare his. Annie ascends to Heaven, taking Chris with her. Chris and Annie are reunited with their children in Heaven, and all appearances are restored. Chris proposes reincarnation so that he and Annie can experience life together again. Chris and Annie meet again as young children in a situation that parallels their first meeting.

In an alternate ending found on the DVD, their children explain that because Annie died by suicide, she must return to Earth and complete her next life naturally. Chris offers to go with her, and the two meet again as children.

== Cast ==
- Robin Williams as Dr. Chris Nielsen
- Cuba Gooding Jr. as Albert Lewis / Ian Nielsen
- Annabella Sciorra as Annie Collins-Nielsen
- Max von Sydow as The Tracker / Albert Lewis
- Jessica Brooks Grant as Marie Nielsen
- Josh Paddock as Ian Nielsen
- Rosalind Chao as Leona / Marie Nielsen
- Lucinda Jenney as Mrs. Jacobs
- Maggie McCarthy as Stacey Jacobs

Additionally, director Werner Herzog has a cameo as one of the faces of the damned / Chris's father.

== Production ==
Principal photography for What Dreams May Come began in late June 1997. The visual effects were created by Mass.lllusions, the same group that developed the bullet time visual effects for The Matrix.

Filming locations include places in Marin County, Alameda County, Glacier National Park, and Angel Falls. Part of the "Hell" sequence was filmed on the decrepit hull of the Essex class aircraft carrier USS Oriskany (CV-34) while berthed at Mare Island in Vallejo, California.

The original prints of the film were lost in a fire at Universal Studios' backlot on June 1, 2008. A worldwide search was launched for a copy, and one was found in Europe.

The special-edition DVD and the 2011 Blu-ray include an alternate ending — the ending from the novel — in which reincarnation is not a choice but part of the natural order. Ian and Marie explain that Chris and Annie will meet again in their new lives, but Annie must atone for killing herself —her new incarnation will die young, and Chris' new incarnation will spend the remainder of this life as a widower before the two are again reunited in Heaven. Chris is reincarnated as a boy in Philadelphia and Annie as a girl in Sri Lanka.

=== Music ===
The musical score for What Dreams May Come was composed and conducted by Michael Kamen and produced by James Seymour Brett. Ennio Morricone had completed and recorded a full score for the film, but after editorial changes were made, his score was rejected and Kamen was hired in his place. Short on time, Kamen took the song "Beside You" from his band the New York Rock & Roll Ensemble's 1971 album Roll Over and adapted it as the film's main musical theme. With just over three weeks to write, record, and mix the score, Kamen took a more direct approach. "I was at an extremely profound juncture in my own life at that time, and the film produced a powerful and personal response in me," said Kamen. "I know, despite the mixed response to the film itself, that I accomplished one of my best and most focused scores."

The score was performed by the London Metropolitan Orchestra and recorded at both AIR Studios and Abbey Road Studios. A soundtrack album was released on October 13, 1998, by Beyond Music.

== Differences from the novel ==
The film differs significantly from the novel in its plot and its vision of the afterlife.

The novel has far more references to Theosophical, New Age, and paranormal beliefs. The author, Richard Matheson, wrote in an introductory note that only the characters are fictional and that almost everything else is based on research (the book includes an extensive bibliography). Story elements that do not show up in the film include astral projection, telepathy, a séance, and the term "Summerland" (a name for a simplified heaven in Theosophy, and for heaven in general in religions such as Wicca).

The details of Chris's life on Earth differ strongly in the novel. Only Chris and his wife (called Ann) die. Their children, who are adults rather than young children, remain alive, as minor characters. Albert and Leona are the people they appear to be, and the character played by Max Von Sydow does not appear in the book. Albert is Chris's cousin rather than simply a friend. Chris and Ann are rural types rather than the urbanites portrayed in the film. Chris is not a pediatrician but a Hollywood screenwriter. Ann is not a painter and has a variety of jobs.

In the book, the afterlife imagery is based on natural scenery rather than paintings. The novel's depiction of hell is considerably more violent than in the film. Chris finds it difficult to move, breathe, or see, and he suffers physical torture at the hands of some inhabitants. He does not encounter ships, thunderstorms, fire, or the sea of human faces on which his film counterpart walks. Instead, Albert climbs craggy cliffs and encounters sights such as a swarm of insects that attack people.

Ann is consigned to hell for 24 years, not eternity. At the end, which resembles an alternate version of the film but not the standard version, she escapes from hell by being reincarnated because she is not ready for heaven.

== Reception ==
The film was the second-highest-grossing film at the US box office in its opening weekend behind Antz, and went on to gross $55 million in the United States and Canada, with a further $20 million internationally, for a worldwide total of $75 million.

On its initial release, critical reception for What Dreams May Come was mixed. On Rotten Tomatoes, the film has an approval rating of 52%, based on 69 reviews, with an average score of 5.70/10. The site's critical consensus reads, "An insubstantial plot overshadows the beautiful, surreal scenery." On Metacritic, the film has a weighted average score of 44 out of 100, based on reviews from 25 critics, indicating "mixed or average reviews". Audiences surveyed by CinemaScore gave the film a grade "B" on a scale of A+ to F.

Roger Ebert of the Chicago Sun-Times awarded the film three and a half stars out of four, remarking:

This is a film that even in its imperfect form shows how movies can imagine the unknown, can lead our imaginations into wonderful places. And it contains heartbreakingly effective performances by Robin Williams and Annabella Sciorra."

James Berardinelli of ReelViews gave What Dreams May Come three stars out of four, saying:

Many movies have offered representations of heaven and hell, but few with as much conviction and creativity as What Dreams May Come. The plot, which focuses on the sacrifices one man will make for true love, is neither complicated nor original, but, bolstered by the director's incredible visual sense, it becomes an affecting piece of drama.

Owen Gleiberman of Entertainment Weekly gave the film a C+, writing that "There's a central contradiction in a fairy tale like this one: the film may preach to the audience about matters of the spirit, but its bejeweled special-effects vision of the afterlife can't help but come off as aggressively literal-minded."

Leonard Maltin, in his annual publication TV Movies, gave the film a "BOMB" rating, describing it as being "off-putting gobbledygook".

In an interview regarding adaptations of his work, Richard Matheson stated, "I will not comment on What Dreams May Come except to say that a major producer in Hollywood said to me, 'They should have shot your book.' Amen. I must add that the producer, Stephen Simon, tried to get my script filmed for many years, so I can't fault him for finally having to go the route he did in order to get the film made."

== Accolades ==
Award	Category	Recipient	Result
Academy Awards	Best Art Direction	Eugenio Zanetti and Cindy Carr	Nominated
Academy Awards	Best Visual Effects	Nicholas Brooks, Joel Hynek, Kevin Mack, and Stuart Robertson	Won
Art Directors Guild	Excellence in Production Design	Eugenio Zanetti, Jim Dultz, Tomas Voth and Christian Wintter	Won
Satellite Awards	Best Visual Effects		Won

== See also ==
- Descent to the underworld
- The Lovely Bones
- List of films about angels
