= Manos Hatzidakis =

Greek composer (1925–1994)

Manos Hatzidakis Μάνος Χατζιδάκις

Background information
- Born: Emmanouil Hatzidakis; 23 October 1925; Xanthi, Greece
- Died: 15 June 1994 (aged 68) Athens, Greece
- Genres: Classical music; éntekhno; film score
- Occupations: Composer; musician
- Instruments: Piano; violin; accordion
- Years active: 1944–1994

Manos Hatzidakis (also spelled Hadjidakis; Greek: Μάνος Χατζιδάκις; 23 October 1925 – 15 June 1994) was a Greek composer and theorist of Greek music, widely regarded as one of the greatest Greek composers of all time. He was one of the main proponents of the "éntekhno" form of music, along with Mikis Theodorakis, and he is credited as the founder of the Orchestra of Colours, an ensemble performing lesser-known works and the music of Greek composers, and influenced a broad swath of Greek culture through his writings and radio broadcasts. With his theoretical and compositional work, he is considered to be the first to connect post-war the worded music with traditional music.

In 1960, Hatzidakis won an Academy Award for Best Original Song for "Never on Sunday" from the film Never on Sunday, but he refused the award because he felt that Athens was misrepresented in the film.

== Early life ==
Emmanouil Hatzidakis (Greek: Εμμανουήλ Χατζηδάκης) was born on 23 October 1925 in Xanthi, Greece, to lawyer Georgios Hatzidakis, who came from the village of Myrthios, Agios Vasileios, in the Rethymno prefecture in Crete; and Aliki Arvanitidou, who came from Adrianoupolis. The family prospered from sales of tobacco grown locally, but the boy's father died in 1931 and his mother took him to live in Athens in comparative poverty.

Hatzidakis studied music theory with Menelaos Pallandios, in the period 1940–1943. At the same time, he studied philosophy at the University of Athens. However, he never completed this course. He met and connected with other musicians, writers, and intellectuals including George Seferis, Odysseas Elytis, Angelos Sikelianos, Yannis Tsarouchis and especially the poet Nikos Gatsos who became a close friend. During the last stages of the Axis occupation of Greece, Hatzidakis was an active participant in the Greek Resistance through membership of the United Panhellenic Organization of Youth (EPON), the youth branch of the major resistance organisation EAM, where he met Mikis Theodorakis with whom he soon developed a strong friendship.

== Career ==
Hatzidakis's first composition was the tune for the song "Paper Moon" ("Χάρτινο το Φεγγαράκι"), from Tennessee Williams' A Streetcar Named Desire staged by Karolos Koun's Art Theatre of Athens. His first piano piece, "For a Little White Seashell" ("Για μια Μικρή Λευκή Αχιβάδα"), came out in 1947, and in 1948 he set a collection of Gatsos poetry to music: Blood Wedding. In 1949, Hatzidakis shook the musical establishment by delivering an influential lecture on rembetika, the urban folk songs that flourished in Greek cities, mainly Piraeus, after the Asia Minor refugee influx in 1922. Hatzidakis focused on the economy of expression, the deep traditional roots and the genuineness of emotion displayed in rembetika, and exalted the likes of composers like Markos Vamvakaris and Vassilis Tsitsanis. Putting theory to practice, he adapted classic rembetika in his 1951 piano work, Six Popular Pictures (Έξι Λαϊκές Ζωγραφιές), which was later also presented as a folk ballet. Also in 1949 he co-founded the Greek Dance Theatre Company with the choreographer Rallou Manou.

At this point he began writing immensely popular songs and movie soundtracks alongside more serious works, such as 1954's The C.N.S. Cycle (O Kyklos tou C.N.S.), a song cycle for piano and voice. In 1955 he wrote the score for Michael Cacoyannis' film Stella, with actress Melina Mercouri singing the movie's trademark song "Love that became a double-edged knife" ("Αγάπη που 'γινες δίκοπο μαχαίρι").

He composed the score for the 1955 film Laterna, ftoxia kai filotimo "Λατέρνα, φτώχεια και φιλότιμο"

In 1958, Hatzidakis met Nana Mouskouri, his first "ideal interpreter". It was 1960 that brought him international success, as his song "Never on Sunday" ("Τα παιδιά του Πειραιά"), from Jules Dassin's film Never on Sunday (Ποτέ την Κυριακή), won him an Academy Award and became a worldwide hit. Hatzidakis did not attend the Academy Award ceremony in 1961, and refused to collect his award. He said that the film Never on Sunday with a prostitute as its protagonist reflected negatively on Athens.

In 1962, Hatzidakis founded a music competition to encourage Greek composers, with the first award going to Iannis Xenakis in 1963. Also in 1962, Hatzidakis produced the musical Street of Dreams (Οδός Ονείρων) and completed his score for Aristophanes' Birds (Όρνιθες), another Art Theater production which caused an uproar over Koun's revolutionary direction. The score was also used later by Maurice Béjart's Ballet of the 20th Century. He also wrote the music for a song which Arthur Altman added English lyrics to and gave to Brenda Lee. The song was "All Alone Am I". In 1964, he released the album 15 Vespers (Δεκαπέντε Εσπερινοί) with the famous song "Mr Antonis ("Ο Κυρ Αντώνης").

In 1965, his LP Gioconda's Smile (Το Χαμόγελο της Τζιοκόντας) was released on Minos-EMI. The album was re-released in 2004, digitally remastered as an audiophile LP and a CD in the EMI Classics collection. In 1966, Hatzidakis travelled to New York City for the premiere of Illya Darling, a Broadway musical based on Never on Sunday, which starred Mercouri.

== Living outside Greece ==
Hatzidakis lived in the United States from 1966 to 1972, during which he completed several more major compositions, including Rhythmology (Rythmologia) for solo piano, his compilation, Gioconda's Smile (produced by Quincy Jones), and the song cycle, Magnus Eroticus (Megalos Erotikos), in which he used ancient (Sappho, Euripides), medieval (stanzas from folk songs and George Hortatzis' romance Erophile) and modern (Dionysios Solomos, Constantine Cavafy, Odysseus Elytis, Nikos Gatsos) Greek poems, as well as an excerpt from the Old Testament book "Song of Songs". He released the album Reflections, a collaboration with the New York Rock & Roll Ensemble.

== Later years ==
Hatzidakis returned to Greece in 1972 and recorded Magnus Eroticus with opera-trained alto Fleury Dantonaki and singer Dimitris Psarianos. Following the Greek junta's overthrow in 1974, he became active in public life and assumed a number of leadership positions in the Athens State Orchestra (KOA), the Greek National Opera (ELS/GNO), and the Hellenic Broadcasting Corporation (ERT). In 1985 he launched his own record company "Seirios", named after Sirius, the hunting dog of mythical Orion. In 1989 Hatzidakis founded and directed the Orchestra of Colours, an ensemble performing lesser-known works and the music of Greek composers.

Although he said Greece must enter the European Economic Community (EEC, later the European Union) for economic reasons, he believed that Greece would be culturally assimilated.

In the later years of his life, Hatzidakis explained that his work was meant not to entertain but to reveal. Further, he disclaimed part of his work, written for the Greek cinema and theater, as unrepresentative.

== Death ==
Hatzidakis died from a heart attack on 15 June 1994 in Athens at the age of 68. In 1999 the city of Athens dedicated the museum Technopolis in his memory. He was buried in Paiania.

== Musical scores ==
- Adoulotoi Sklavoi - Unsubdued Slaves – US title (1946)
- Kokkinos Vrahos (1949)
- Dyo Kosmi – The Two Worlds (1949)
- Nekri Politeia – Dead City – US title (1951)
- O Grousouzis – The Grouch – US title (1952)
- Agni Tou Limaniou - Lily of the Harbour – US title (1952)
- Stella - Στέλλα (1955)
- The Counterfeit Coin - Η κάλπικη λίρα (1955)
- O Drakos – The Ogre of Athens – US title (1956)
- One Street Organ, One Life (1958)
- To Nisi Ton Gennaion - The Braves' Island – US title (1959)
- Never on Sunday (Ποτέ Την Κυριακή) (1960)
- Woe to the Young (1961)
- It Happened in Athens (1962)
- The 300 Spartans (1962)
- America America (1963)
- Topkapi (1964)
- Gioconda's Smile (Το Χαμόγελο Της Τζοκόντας) (1965)
- Illya Darling (1967) – Broadway musical
- Blue (1968)
- Reflections (1969) – Performed by the New York Rock & Roll Ensemble
- The Invincible Six (1970)
- The Pedestrian (1973)
- Sweet Movie (1974)
- Faccia di spia (1975)
- Memed, My Hawk (1984)
- Reflections (2005) – Performed by Raining Pleasure. Special appearance by Meriam performing the song "Kemal"
- Amorgos (2006)
