= Kevin Mack (visual effects artist) =

American visual effects artist

- Born: Kevin Scott Mack; July 23, 1959 (age 66); Los Angeles, California, USA
- Occupation: Visual effects artist
- Years active: 1982–present
- Spouse: Snow Mack (?-Present)
- Children: 2-Jon Mack and Olivia Mack
- Parent: Brice Mack (1917-2008)
- Website: http://www.kevinmackart.com/

Kevin Mack (born July 23, 1959) is an American visual effects artist. He won at the 71st Academy Awards in the category of Best Visual Effects for his work on What Dreams May Come. He shared his Academy Award with Nicholas Brooks, Joel Hynek and Stuart Robertson.

== Career ==
Kevin Mack is the founder of Shape Space VR. Through Shape Space, Mack has created and produced virtual reality experiences including Zen Parade, Blortasia, and Anandala.

== Personal life ==
His wife Snow Mack is an artist and his father was a Disney animator.
