= Vassilikos =

Greek singer

Vassilikos (full name: Vassilikos Sakkas) is the frontman and singer of the Greek indie/pop-rock band Raining Pleasure. Vassilikos is the composer, singer, bassist/guitarist and lyricist for the band and has released seven albums with them. Three of the band's albums were released by Minos EMI, and two of them achieved gold sales. Vassilikos and his band have toured Greece, Germany, Turkey and Romania, participating in European festivals such as Rock'n Coke and the Hurricane Festival and sharing the stage with bands such as the Pixies, The Cure, Pearl Jam, Kasabian and Arcade Fire.

== Solo career ==
In 2009 Vassilikos signed with Sony Music Greece to record his first solo album, Vintage (Songs I Wish I'd Written Vol.1), a compilation of songs from the 1930s–60s. He added his own interpretations to the classic songs to make them sound contemporary. Vassilikos sang on the album, arranged and played the instrumental parts and co-produced the recording with the English producer Clive Martin, who has worked with bands and artists including Queen, Peter Gabriel, Terrorvision, Reef, Puressence, Stereophonics and Les Négresses Vertes. Vintage was certified as a gold record a few weeks after its release.

During the summer of 2011 Vassilikos toured with Dimitra Galani. The tour started at the Little Theatre of Ancient Epidaurus as part of the Athens and Epidaurus Festival 2011. A live album featuring Vassilikos and Galani was subsequently released by Sony Music Greece.

In September 2012 he performed the songs of Vassilis Tsitsanis, a major figure of Greek popular music, in a concert at the Athens Concert Hall. Vassilikos reinterpreted the songs of the famous rebetiko musician using contemporary arrangements. Vassilikos also took part in a series of concerts of songs and symphonic works by the composer Yannis Markopoulos at the Athens Concert Hall and the Odeon of Herodes Atticus.

In the spring of 2013 Vassilikos recorded an EP of Vassilis Tsitsanis songs using the adaptations of Tsitsanis’ work he had performed at the Athens Concert Hall. Vassilikos also arranged and produced the recording, playing the instrumental parts himself. The LP, called Sunday Cloudy Sunday, was released by Minos EMI-Universal in July of that year. Sunday Cloudy Sunday was performed live at the Little Theatre of Ancient Epidaurus in July 2014 as part of the Athens and Epidaurus Festival.

== Discography ==
Studio and live albums with Raining Pleasure:

- Memory Comes Back (1996)
- Nostalgia (1998)
- Capricorn EP (2000)
- Flood (2001)
- Forwards & Backwards (2003)
- Reflections (2005)
- Who's Gonna Tell Juliet (2007)
- Live in Athens (2009)

Solo albums:

- Vintage - Songs I wish I'd written (2009)
- Vintage vinyl - More songs I wish I'd written (2010)
- Live at Gazarte - with Dimitra Galani (2011)
- Sunday Cloudy Sunday (2013)
- Amazing Grey (2019)
