= Dorian Rudnytsky =

American cellist and composer (born 1944)

- Доріан Рудницький
- Born: July 9, 1944 (age 82); New York City, New York, U.S.
- Occupations: Cellist, composer

Dorian Rudnytsky (Note: Ukrainian: Доріан Рудницький, romanized: Dorian Rudnytskyi) (born July 9, 1944) is an American cellist and composer. He was born in New York City to a Ukrainian family. His father was the composer/conductor Antin Rudnytsky, and his mother was the soprano Maria Sokil.

He graduated from the Juilliard School of Music in New York City, a "grandson of Pablo Casals", having studied with his favorite pupil, Maurice Eisenberg.

== New York Rock & Roll Ensemble ==
During the late 60s into the 70s while pursuing a schedule of solo concerts as a classical cellist, Rudnytsky also co-founded a rock and roll band, the New York Rock & Roll Ensemble, together with Michael Kamen and Marty Fulterman (now known as Mark Snow), both also students at Juilliard. With its unique crossover between classical and rock music it became very successful with 6 albums released with major labels like Atlantic Records.

The group went on many international tours, had appearances in all major festivals and concert halls including not only solo performances but also special appearances as guest artists with the New York Philharmonic Orchestra under Leonard Bernstein at Carnegie Hall in New York City, the Cleveland Symphony, the Detroit Symphony among others, performances on all major national television shows, and a special guest appearance in the film Zachariah.

== Later years ==
Later, Rudnytsky settled in Los Angeles as a cellist and bass player for the television and film industry. Since 1995, he has split his year between his homes in Siegen, Germany and Calpe, Spain, composing music for theater productions (both classical and rock), and continuing to pursue his career as a solo cellist.

In spring 2005 his Costa Blanca Suite, a concert for solo cello, rock band, and symphony orchestra, had its world premiere with the Philharmonie Südwestfalen. It had its Spanish premiere in 2006 on the Costa Blanca.
