= Cindy Carr =

American set decorator

- Occupation: Set decorator
- Years active: 1983-present

Cindy Carr is an American set decorator. She has been nominated for two Academy Awards in the category Best Art Direction.

== Selected filmography ==
- The Fisher King (1991)
- What Dreams May Come (1998)
