= Tavriiske rural hromada =

Tavriiske rural hromada Таврійська селищна громада
- Hromada
- Interactive map of Tavriiske rural hromada
- Country: Ukraine
- Oblast: Zaporizhzhia Oblast
- Raion: Zaporizhzhia Raion

Area
  - Total: 184.1 km^{2} (71.1 sq mi)

Population (2020)
  - Total: 4,172
  - Density: 22.66/km^{2} (58.69/sq mi)
- Settlements: 3
- Villages: 3

Tavriiske rural hromada (Ukrainian: Таврійська селищна громада) is a hromada of Ukraine, in Zaporizhzhia Raion, Zaporizhzhia Oblast. Its administrative center is the village of Tavriiske.

It has an area of 184.1 square kilometres (71.1 mi^{2}) and a population of 4,172, as of 2020.

The hromada contains 3 villages: Liubymivka, Tavriiske, and Yurkivka.

== See also ==
- List of hromadas of Ukraine
