= Michael Kamen =

American musician (1948–2003)

- Kamen in 1993
- Born: Michael Arnold Kamen; April 15, 1948; New York City, New York, U.S.
- Died: November 18, 2003 (aged 55); London, England
- Education: High School of Music & Art; Juilliard School
- Spouse: Sandra Keenan-Kamen
- Musical career
- Genres: Film score; rock; pop rock
- Occupations: Composer; orchestral arranger; orchestral conductor; songwriter; session musician
- Instruments: Oboe; piano
- Years active: 1967–2003
- Formerly of: New York Rock & Roll Ensemble; Roger Waters Band
- Website: michaelkamen.com

Michael Arnold Kamen (April 15, 1948 – November 18, 2003) was an American composer, arranger, conductor, songwriter, and musician. He began his work as a pop and rock music arranger, notably for Pink Floyd, and was a member of the New York Rock & Roll Ensemble and the Roger Waters Band. Starting in the mid-1980s, he achieved further prominence as a composer of film scores.

Kamen's best known scores include the Die Hard and Lethal Weapon franchises, the Terry Gilliam films Brazil (1985) and The Adventures of Baron Munchausen (1988), Highlander (1986), Robin Hood: Prince of Thieves (1991), Don Juan DeMarco (1994), What Dreams May Come (1998), The Iron Giant (1999), X-Men (2000), and the television series Edge of Darkness, Tales from the Crypt, and Band of Brothers.

During his career, Kamen won four Grammy Awards, out of nine total nominations, and a BAFTA TV Award, and was nominated for two Academy Awards for Best Original Song, four Golden Globe Awards, and a Primetime Emmy Award.

== Early life ==
Michael Arnold Kamen was born in New York City, the second of four sons. His father, Saul Kamen, was a dentist and his mother, Helen, was a teacher. He was of Jewish heritage.

While attending the High School of Music & Art near Harlem in Manhattan, New York. Kamen became friends with Martin Fulterman (later known as Mark Snow), who later composed the theme music for The X-Files, among other projects. While studying oboe, Kamen formed a rock-classical fusion band called New York Rock & Roll Ensemble, together with classmates Fulterman and Dorian Rudnytsky, along with Clifton Nivison and Brian Corrigan of Toms River, New Jersey. The group released five albums from 1968 to 1972 (Self-Titled, Reflections, Faithful Friends, Roll Over & Freedomburger). They performed in white tie (not tuxedos), as typically worn by classical musicians. In the middle of their concerts, Fulterman and Kamen played an oboe duet. The group backed friend and classmate Janis Ian in a concert at Alice Tully Hall in Lincoln Center in late 1967.

After graduating from high school, Kamen attended The Juilliard School in Manhattan. His early work concentrated on ballets before extending to Hollywood with the score for The Next Man in 1976, and then to pop and rock arranging, collaborating with Pink Floyd on their album The Wall.

== Career ==
=== Popular music ===
Kamen became a highly sought-after arranger in the realms of pop and rock music. His contemporaries in this field included Academy Award winner Anne Dudley, Richard Niles, and Nick Ingman.

His successes include his work with Pink Floyd, David Gilmour and Roger Waters (he is one of the few people invited to work with both former Pink Floyd members, even after their acrimonious split), as well as Queen (orchestration on "Who Wants to Live Forever"), Roger Daltrey, Aerosmith (live orchestral version of "Dream On" for MTV), Kiss, Tom Petty, Bon Jovi, David Bowie, Bryan Ferry, Eurythmics, Queensrÿche, Rush, Metallica (on the song "Nothing Else Matters" and their live album S&M), Def Leppard, Herbie Hancock, Tim Curry, the Cranberries, Bryan Adams, Jim Croce, Coldplay, Sting, Guns N' Roses (on their performance of "November Rain" on the MTV Video Music Awards) and Kate Bush. For Bush, Kamen delivered an orchestral backing for "Moments of Pleasure" from The Red Shoes album, substantially building upon a simple piano theme Bush had composed. In this instance and many others, he conducted the orchestra personally for the recording. In 1984, two years after moving to London, Kamen had similarly heightened the effect of a pop recording for the Eurythmics "Here Comes the Rain Again", the score relied as much on his compositional skills as his arranging talents.

In 1990, Kamen joined many other guests for Roger Waters' performance of The Wall in Berlin, and led the National Philharmonic Orchestra during the 24 Nights sessions with Eric Clapton in 1991. Lenny Kravitz recorded a cover of "Fields of Joy", a song co-written by Kamen and Hal Fredricks, on his 1991 CD Mama Said. In 2002, Kamen took part in the Concert for George as strings conductor.

Kamen had a successful partnership with Bryan Adams and "Mutt" Lange composing scores and songs. The ballad "(Everything I Do) I Do It for You" for the 1991 film Robin Hood: Prince of Thieves was the number one song that year worldwide. Their other songs were "All for Love" for the film The Three Musketeers in 1993, "Have You Ever Really Loved a Woman?" for the film Don Juan DeMarco in 1994, and "Star" for the film Jack in 1996.

=== Film and television ===
Kamen wrote eleven ballets, a saxophone concerto and an electric guitar concerto (with Japanese guitarist Tomoyasu Hotei as a soloist, though originally performed by Eric Clapton). Additionally, he wrote a commissioned work, "Quintet", for the Canadian Brass. He also provided scores for the films 101 Dalmatians (1996), The Dead Zone, For Queen and Country, Polyester, Brazil, Someone To Watch Over Me, The Adventures of Baron Munchausen, The Three Musketeers, Highlander, X-Men, Robin Hood: Prince of Thieves, Licence to Kill, the Lethal Weapon series, the first three films of the Die Hard series, Mr. Holland's Opus, The Iron Giant, Splitting Heirs, Frequency and many others. He also scored both the From the Earth to the Moon and Band of Brothers series on HBO. Trailers for the 2007 release Bee Movie, the 2008 release Nim's Island, the 2008 release WALL-E, and the 2014 release Mr. Peabody & Sherman featured Kamen's "Central Services / The Office" from his score to Brazil (1985).

In television, Kamen composed music for two series of The Manageress produced by Glenn Wilhide, at Zed Productions for Channel 4, and Joan Bakewell's interview series Memento in 1993, also at Zed Productions for Channel 4 directed by Robin Bextor. He also worked on the 1985 BBC Television serial Edge of Darkness, collaborating with Eric Clapton to write the score. The pair received a British Academy Television Award for Best Original Television Music for Edge of Darkness and performed the main theme with the National Philharmonic Orchestra at the Royal Albert Hall in 1990 and 1991. In 1994, Kamen conducted an orchestration of the Who's music for Roger Daltrey's 50th birthday concert series entitled A Celebration: The Music of Pete Townshend and The Who, which was subsequently released on CD and DVD. In the same year he was initially hired to do the soundtrack for the 1994 film Speed, but Jan de Bont, the director of the movie, rejected him because he wanted Mark Mancina, who at the time worked on some Hans Zimmer scores like Days of Thunder, Where Sleeping Dogs Lie and True Romance.

Kamen was nominated for two Academy Awards and won three Grammy Awards, two Golden Globes, two Ivor Novello Awards, an Annie Award, and an Emmy.

=== Later years ===
Kamen's involvement with Mr. Holland's Opus, a film about a frustrated composer who finds fulfillment as a high school music teacher, led him to create The Mr. Holland's Opus Foundation in 1996. The foundation supports music education through the donation of new and refurbished musical instruments to underserved school and community music programs and individual students in the United States. In 2005 the foundation created an emergency fund for schools, and students affected by Hurricane Katrina.

In 1998, Kamen composed and conducted the soundtrack for What Dreams May Come. Produced by James Seymour Brett, the score was initially set to be composed by Ennio Morricone. The Italian composer had initially completed and recorded a full score for the film but, after editorial changes were made, his score was rejected and Kamen was hired in his place. Short on time, Kamen took the song "Beside You" from his New York Rock Ensemble's album Roll Over and adapted it as the movie's main musical theme.

In April 1999, Kamen worked with the heavy metal band Metallica, along with the San Francisco Symphony, to record a two-day concert that was held at the Berkeley Community Theatre in Berkeley, California. The concert performance, titled S&M, which is an acronym for "Symphony and Metallica", referencing the collaboration of the two artists, was released on November 23, 1999, on CD, DVD, and VHS formats, debuting at #2 on the Billboard 200 and reaching multi-platinum status by 2001. Later that year, Kamen and Metallica won a Grammy Award For Best Rock Instrumental Performance for the S&M track "The Call Of Ktulu".

In 2001 and 2002, Kamen performed with David Gilmour at Gilmour's semi-unplugged shows at the Royal Festival Hall, playing piano and cor anglais. The 2001 concert and highlights from 2002 were released on DVD as David Gilmour in Concert. In 2002, Kamen, along with Julian Lloyd Webber, Evelyn Glennie and James Galway, launched the Music Education Consortium in the UK. The consortium's efforts led to the injection of £332 million for music education in the UK. He was also commissioned to write a piece for the opening ceremonies of the Winter Olympics in Salt Lake City.

Kamen's last recorded work appeared on Bryan Adams's album Room Service, on which he played the oboe and wrote the orchestration to "I Was Only Dreamin'". Kamen had also completed the charts for accompaniment to two songs on Kate Bush's album Aerial, which was released in April 2005.

== Personal life ==
=== Health ===
Kamen was diagnosed with multiple sclerosis in 1996.

== Death ==
He died in London from a heart attack on November 18, 2003, at age 55.

== Legacy ==
In 2004, when Annie Lennox accepted the Academy Award for Best Original Song (for "Into the West" from The Lord of the Rings: The Return of the King), she dedicated her achievement to the memory of Kamen.

The 2004 films Boo, Zino & the Snurks (also known as Back to Gaya) and First Daughter, which Kamen was working on at the time of his death, were dedicated to his memory. David Gilmour's 2006 album On an Island was dedicated to the memory of Kamen and longtime Pink Floyd manager Steve O'Rourke.

== Film scores ==
Year	Title	Director	Studio(s)	Notes
1976	The Next Man	Richard C. Sarafian	Allied Artists Pictures Corporation	—N/a
1977	Stunts	Mark L. Lester	New Line Cinema	—N/a
1980	S*H*E	Robert Michael Lewis	A.E.C. Filmproduktions	—N/a
1981	Venom	Piers Haggard	Paramount Pictures	—N/a
1982	Pink Floyd – The Wall	Alan Parker; Gerald Scarfe	Goldcrest Film International; Metro-Goldwyn-Mayer	Collaboration with Pink Floyd and Bob Ezrin
1983	The Dead Zone	David Cronenberg	Lorimar Film Entertainment; Paramount Pictures (US/Canada); De Laurentiis Entertainment Group (International)	Soundtrack released by Milan Records; performed by the National Philharmonic Orchestra and recorded at EMI Studio, London
1985	Brazil	Terry Gilliam	Embassy Pictures; Columbia Pictures	Performed by the National Philharmonic Orchestra; soundtrack released by Milan Records
1985	Lifeforce	Tobe Hooper	Cannon Films; TriStar Pictures	Additional music only; majority of score by Henry Mancini; expanded score released by BSX Records
1985	Edge of Darkness	Martin Campbell	BBC	TV miniseries; composed with Eric Clapton; won a BAFTA Award for Best Original Television Score
1986	Highlander	Russell Mulcahy	Cannon Films; 20th Century Fox (US); Thorn EMI Screen Entertainment (International)	Performed by the National Philharmonic Orchestra; most of the film's songs are featured on the Queen album A Kind of Magic; no official soundtrack was released, but bootleg releases of the score exist, and some cues are included in the Highlander: The Scores compilation
1986	Mona Lisa	Neil Jordan	HandMade Films; Island Pictures	Soundtrack released by Columbia Music
1986	Amazing Stories	Martin Scorsese	Amblin Entertainment; Universal Television	TV series; Episode "Mirror, Mirror" only
1987	Lethal Weapon	Richard Donner	Silver Pictures; Warner Bros.	Composed with Clapton and David Sanborn; soundtrack released by Warner Bros. Records
1987	Rita, Sue and Bob Too	Alan Clarke	Channel 4	Soundtrack released by Ariola Records
1987	Adventures in Babysitting	Chris Columbus	Touchstone Pictures; Silver Screen Patterns III	—N/a
1987	Suspect	Peter Yates	TriStar Pictures	Soundtrack released by Varèse Sarabande
1987	Someone to Watch Over Me	Ridley Scott	Columbia Pictures	—N/a
1988	Die Hard	John McTiernan	Silver Pictures; Gordon Company; 20th Century Fox	Performed by the Hollywood Studio Symphony; soundtrack released by Varèse Sarabande in 2002.
1988	The Raggedy Rawney	Bob Hoskins	HandMade Films; Virgin Films	Soundtrack released by Silva Screen
1988	The Adventures of Baron Munchausen	Terry Gilliam	Allied Filmmakers; Columbia Pictures	Soundtrack released by Warner Bros. Records
1988	Crusoe	Caleb Deschanel	Island Pictures	Limited Edition Soundtrack released by Quartet Records in 2013 (1000 copies)
1989	Renegades	Jack Sholder	Morgan Creek Productions; Interscope Communications; Universal Pictures	Soundtrack released by Intrada Records
1989	Licence to Kill	John Glen	Eon Productions; Metro-Goldwyn-Mayer; United Artists	Performed by the National Philharmonic Orchestra; soundtrack released by MCA Records
1989	Road House	Rowdy Herrington	Silver Pictures; United Artists	Soundtrack released by Intrada Records
1989	Lethal Weapon 2	Richard Donner	Silver Pictures; Warner Bros.	Composed with Clapton and Sanborn; soundtrack released by Warner Bros. Records
1990	Cold Dog Soup	Alan Metter	HandMade Films; Anchor Bay Entertainment	—N/a
1990	Die Hard 2	Renny Harlin	Silver Pictures; Gordon Company; 20th Century Fox	Performed by the Los Angeles Motion Picture All-Stars Orchestra; soundtrack released by Varèse Sarabande
1990	The Krays	Peter Medak	Parkfield Entertainment; Rank Film Distributors	Soundtrack released by Parkfield Music
1991	Nothing but Trouble	Dan Aykroyd	Warner Bros.	—N/a
1991	Hudson Hawk	Michael Lehmann	Silver Pictures; TriStar Pictures	Soundtrack released by Varèse Sarabande
1991	Robin Hood: Prince of Thieves	Kevin Reynolds	Morgan Creek Productions; Warner Bros.	The score was orchestrated by a record-breaking total of 13 people; soundtrack released by Polydor Records; nominated for a Golden Globe for Best Original Score; the song "(Everything I Do) I Do It For You" was also nominated for an Academy Award and a Golden Globe
1991	Company Business	Nicholas Meyer	Metro-Goldwyn-Mayer	Soundtrack released by Intrada Records
1991	Let Him Have It	Peter Medak	British Screen Productions	Soundtrack released by Virgin Records
1991	The Last Boy Scout	Tony Scott	Geffen Pictures; Silver Pictures; Warner Bros.	Soundtrack released by La-La Land Records
1992	Two-Fisted Tales	Richard Donner; Tom Holland; Robert Zemeckis	Carolco Pictures	Television film; Segment "Showdown"
1992	Tales from the Crypt	various	Home Box Office	TV series; 4 episodes
1992	Shining Through	David Seltzer	20th Century Fox	Soundtrack released by RCA Records
1992	Lethal Weapon 3	Richard Donner	Silver Pictures; Warner Bros.	Composed with Clapton and Sanborn; Soundtrack released by Warner Bros. Records
1992	Blue Ice	Russell Mulcahy	M&M Productions	—N/a
1993	Splitting Heirs	Robert Young	Universal Pictures (US/Canada); United International Pictures (International)	—N/a
1993	Last Action Hero	John McTiernan	Columbia Pictures	Soundtrack released by Columbia Music
1993	Wilder Napalm	Glenn Gordon Caron	TriStar Pictures	—N/a
1993	The Three Musketeers	Stephen Herek	Walt Disney Pictures; Caravan Pictures	Soundtrack released by Walt Disney Records
1994	Don Juan DeMarco	Jeremy Leven	New Line Cinema	Performed by the London Metropolitan Orchestra; soundtrack released by A&M Records; nominated for a Golden Globe for Best Original Score; The song "Have You Ever Really Loved a Woman ?" was also nominated for an Academy Award and a Golden Globe
1995	Circle of Friends	Pat O'Connor	Savoy Pictures; Cineplex Odeon Films; The Rank Organisation	Soundtrack released by Warner Bros. Records
1995	Die Hard with a Vengeance	John McTiernan	Cinergi Pictures; 20th Century Fox (US/Japan); Touchstone Pictures (International)	Soundtrack released by RCA Victor
1995	The First 100 Years: A Celebration of American Movies	Chuck Workman	American Film Institute (AFI); Silver Pictures; Home Box Office	—N/a
1995	Stonewall	Nigel Finch	Strand Releasing	—N/a
1995	Mr. Holland's Opus	Stephen Herek	PolyGram Filmed Entertainment; Interscope Communications; Hollywood Pictures (US/Canada); Metro-Goldwyn-Mayer (International)	Performed by the Seattle Symphony Orchestra and the London Metropolitan Orchestra; soundtrack released by Decca Records
1996	Jack	Francis Ford Coppola	Hollywood Pictures; American Zoetrope Great Oaks Entertainment	Soundtrack released by Hollywood Records
1996	101 Dalmatians	Stephen Herek	Walt Disney Pictures; Great Oaks Productions	Soundtrack released by Walt Disney Records
1997	Inventing the Abbotts	Pat O'Connor	Fox 2000 Pictures; Imagine Entertainment; 20th Century Fox	—N/a
1997	The Heart Surgeon	Audrey Cooke	BBC	TV movie
1997	Remember Me?	Nick Hurran	Talisman Productions; Channel Four Films	—N/a
1997	Event Horizon	Paul W. S. Anderson	Golar Productions; Impact Pictures; Paramount Pictures	Collaboration with Orbital; performed by the London Metropolitan Orchestra; soundtrack released by London Records
1997	The Winter Guest	Alan Rickman	Capitol Films; Fine Line Features	Soundtrack released by Varèse Sarabande
1998	The Avengers	Jeremiah S. Chechik	Warner Bros.	Rejected score due to last-minute re-editing; replaced by Joel McNeely
1998	From the Earth to the Moon	various	Home Box Office	TV series; 3 episodes; nominated for an Emmy Award
1998	Lethal Weapon 4	Richard Donner	Silver Pictures; Warner Bros.	Composed with Clapton and Sanborn; soundtrack released by La-Land Records
1998	What Dreams May Come	Vincent Ward	Interscope Communications; PolyGram Filmed Entertainment (through Universal Pictures)	Performed by the London Metropolitan Orchestra; soundtrack released by Decca Records
1999	The Iron Giant	Brad Bird	Warner Bros. Feature Animation; Warner Bros.	His first score for an animated film; performed by the Czech Philharmonic Orchestra; soundtrack released by Varèse Sarabande
2000	Frequency	Gregory Hoblit	New Line Cinema	—N/a
2000	X-Men	Bryan Singer	Marvel Entertainment Group; 20th Century Fox	Soundtrack released by Decca Records
2001	Band of Brothers	various	Home Box Office	TV miniseries; soundtrack released by Sony Classical
2003	Open Range	Kevin Costner	Beacon Pictures; Touchstone Pictures	Performed by the Czech Philharmonic Orchestra; soundtrack released by Hollywood Records
2004	Against the Ropes	Charles S. Dutton	Paramount Pictures	Posthumous release
2004	Back to Gaya	Leonard Fritz Krawinkel; Holger Tappe	Ambient Entertainment; Warner Bros. (Germany); Entertainment Film Distributors (United Kingdom); First Look International (United States)	Posthumous release; his second and final score for an animated film
2004	First Daughter	Forest Whitaker	Regency Enterprises; New Regency; Davis Entertainment; 20th Century Fox	Posthumous release, Blake Neely completed the remaining score

== Concert works ==
- Concerto for Saxophone (1990)
- The Wall – Live in Berlin (1990)
- 24 Nights (1991)
- Live in Hyde Park (1997)
- Guitar Concerto (with Tomoyasu Hotei) (1998)
- S&M (1999) with Metallica
- The New Moon in the Old Moon's Arms (2001)
- Quintet (Canadian Brass) (2002)
