= Raining Pleasure =

Greek band

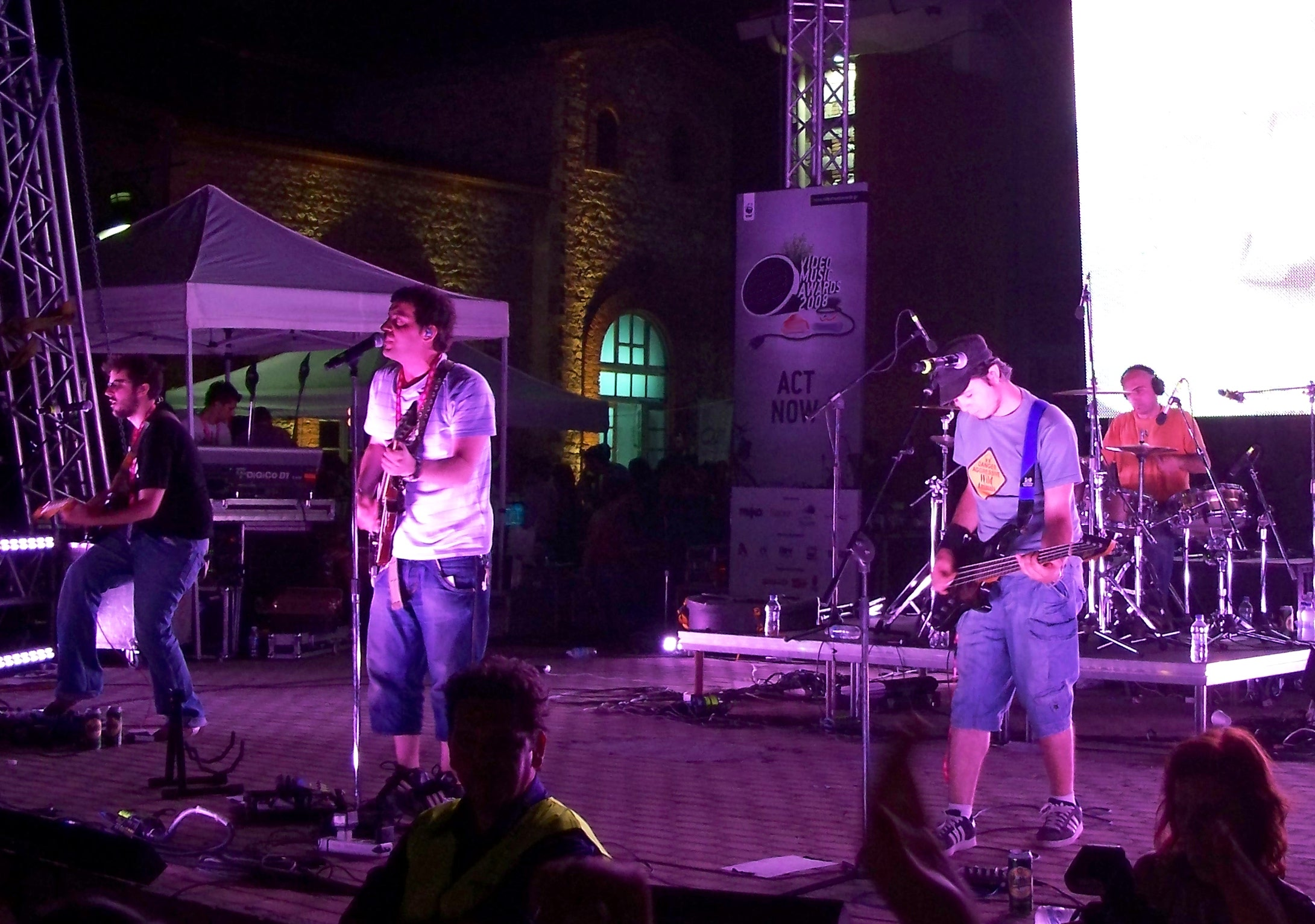
- Raining Pleasure performing live on World Environment Day at Technopolis (Gazi), Athens, Greece (2008)

Background information
- Also known as: Rest in Peace (1990–1992)
- Origin: Patras, Greece
- Genres: Indie rock; alternative rock; indie pop; chamber pop; neo-psychedelia; gothic rock (early)
- Years active: 1990–present
- Labels: Minos EMI (Chrysalis) (EMI); Celesta
- Members: Vassilikos; X-Jeremy; Jay
- Website: www.rainingpleasure.gr

Raining Pleasure is an indie rock band originating from Patras, Greece, often credited with spearheading the newest wave of Greek bands with English lyrics.

== History ==
The band was formed in September 1990 under the name Rest in Peace. A year after their formation the band started appearing live locally. In 1992, they changed their name to Raining Pleasure and started touring Greece. In 1994, the band self-recorded and released a demo of their work (limited to 160 copies); since then, most of its songs have been rerecorded and included in their studio albums. For two more years, the band continued touring Greece and, in 1996, had three of its songs released through Pop & Rock 's magazine compilation Dytiki Akti '96.

Near the end of 1996, the band signed a contract with Lazy Dog Records based in Thessaloniki; in early 1997, they released their first full-length studio album Memory Comes Back which was well-received from the independent press at the time. Their second release, Nostalgia, appeared in August 1998 also under the Lazy Dog banner. Raining Pleasure had the chance that two of their songs be included in two compilations produced by the European collaboration of great radio stations. Also in 1998, one of the issues of the Greek fanzine Fractal Press included a 7 inch vinyl single including the songs "Winters of Waiting" and "Love" (both recorded during the Memories Come Back sessions but left out of the record).

=== Deal with Chrysalis ===
In fall 2000, Raining Pleasure signed a contract with Chrysalis Records, originally obtaining the label as an imprint for their Minos EMI releases. This made them one of the relatively few English-speaking bands in Greece to sign with a multinational record company (the short list includes Closer, Ziggy Was, and, predating them both, The Last Drive). However, no albums were released by Chrysalis Records while under contract and subsequent releases were only available in foreign markets as imports. Around April 2001, the band recorded and released the EP Capricorn before returning to the studio to record their third full-length studio album, their first for a major label.

=== Flood release ===
In December 2001, Raining Pleasure's major label debut Flood was released to critical acclaim. The album performed exceptionally well on the charts, spending 15 weeks on the international chart where it peaked at No. 1 before chart regulations necessitated the album's move to the local repertoire chart where it peaked at No. 5 (an unprecedented feat for a Greek act performing in English). The album spent well over a year on the Top 40 Artist Album Charts and has been certified Gold. It spawned three airplay hits in Greece, the biggest of which, "Fake," has become a pop and rock radio staple, and has been used in several commercial spots as well as in the soundtrack of the film "The Best of Times" directed by the Taiwanese director Tso-chi Chang. "Fake" was followed by the hits "Capricorn" and "Only Through You".

Raining Pleasure gave a series of successful concerts in Greece, which resulted them in supporting bands like The Cure, the Pixies, The Dandy Warhols and Black Rebel Motorcycle Club in their Greek shows.

In 2004, the group's album Forwards & Backwards was introduced by the double A-side single World / Identical Twins. Singer Elly Paspala contributed vocals to the track Identical Twins. Both songs in the single became airplay hits.

In March, the band's cover of ABBA's "Dancing Queen" was featured in the Greek film Hardcore and remained in the airplay charts over six months.

In winter of 2004, the band embarked on its first mini-tour in Germany while in a studio in Cologne to record a new version of the classic album Reflections (originally by Manos Hadjidakis and the New York Rock & Roll Ensemble). Raining Pleasure's Reflections was released to immediate critical acclaim. The album was introduced to media at a concert at St Paul's Anglican Church in Athens. The album has been certified gold.

=== Celesta Records ===
In 2007, they formed their own independent record label Celesta Records under which they released their newest album Who's Gonna Tell Juliet? Physical and digital distribution for the label is handled by Minos EMI.

=== Reunion ===
The band has announced that since September 2022, they have resumed rehearsals. They have announced that they are playing back together. Their plans (for live shows etc) are to be announced.

== Band members ==
- Vassilikos - Vocals, Guitar, Bass
- X-Jeremy - Guitars
- Jay - Drums

== Discography ==
=== Albums ===
- (1996) Memory Comes Back - Lazy Dog Records
- (1998) Nostalgia - Lazy Dog Records
- (2001) Flood: (coming of a) Great Quantity of Water - Chrysalis (Minos EMI)
- (2003) Forwards + Backwards - EMI (Minos EMI)
- (2005) Reflections - EMI (Minos EMI)
- (2007) Who's Gonna Tell Juliet? - (Celesta Records)
- (2010) Live in Athens 2 CDs - (Minos EMI)

=== EPs ===
- (2001) Capricorn - Chrysalis (Minos EMI)
- (2002) Only Through You

=== Singles ===
- (1997) "Winters of Waiting"
- (2001) "Fake"
- (2003) "Kastor Bossa"
- (2003) "The World" / "Identical Twins"
- (2003) "Love me, Love me, Love me"
