= Academy Awards pre-show =

The Academy Awards pre-show (currently known as The Oscars Red Carpet Show) is a live televised pre-show which precedes the start of the Academy Awards telecast by 90 minutes (previously by 30 minutes until 2011). The pre-show takes place on the red carpet surrounding the theater which holds the telecast, and is almost always hosted by various media personalities, such as Regis Philbin, Chris Connelly, Tim Gunn, and Robin Roberts.

With the discontinuation of Barbara Walters' Oscars specials, the pre-show was expanded to 90 minutes for the 83rd Academy Awards. The pre-show returned to its previous 30-minute length for the 96th Academy Awards in 2024, after ABC and the Academy moved up the ceremony's start time by an hour.

== History ==
Beginning with the 1st Academy Awards, there were no Oscar pre-shows. Instead, photographers and interviewers would approach the ceremony's nominees and other attendees as usual. However, these events were neither televised nor heard on the radio prior to the ceremony. In 1979, Regis Philbin officially began the very first red carpet pre-show. However, this event was actually produced by KABC-TV, the ABC O&O station in Los Angeles, and was not broadcast elsewhere. Ten years later, in 1989, both MTV and Movie Time (which became E! a year later) began their red carpet pre-shows with focus on fashion. It would pass another decade, in 1999, when the AMPAS eventually produced its own red carpet pre-show to air on ABC.

Broadcasters such as CNN, E! (under the Live from the Red Carpet banner, which it uses for all major award shows), and Pop have continued to air their own extended red carpet coverage prior to the ceremony. To protect the official telecast, ABC has an exclusive window during the final hour before the ceremony (5:00 p.m. to 6:00 p.m. PT) during which no other broadcaster may broadcast live or newly recorded footage from the red carpet. To comply with this rule, most competing red carpet programs either sign off, or use footage that was recorded earlier. Interviews by other media outlets may continue, but they may not air on television until the end of the window.

== Hosts ==
The pre-show usually employs the use of recent TV or media personalities as the hosts, who interview the nominees and attendees and sometimes introduce special segments in the moments preceding the ceremony. Below is a listing of the hosts of the pre-show since the 74th Academy Awards ceremony held in 2002.

2002

- Chris Connelly
- Leeza Gibbons
- Ananda Lewis

2003

- Jann Carl
- Chris Connelly
- Shaun Robinson

2004

- Billy Bush
- Chris Connelly
- Maria Menounos

2005

- Billy Bush
- Jann Carl
- Chris Connelly
- Shaun Robinson

2006

- Billy Bush
- Chris Connelly
- Cynthia Garrett
- Vanessa Lachey

2007

- Chris Connelly
- Lisa Ling
- André Leon Talley
- Allyson Waterman

2008

- Regis Philbin
- Shaun Robinson
- Samantha Harris

2009

- Tim Gunn
- Robin Roberts
- Jess Cagle

2010

- Jess Cagle
- Kathy Ireland
- Sherri Shepherd

2011

- Tim Gunn
- Maria Menounos
- Robin Roberts
- Krista Smith

2012

- Jess Cagle
- Nina Garcia
- Tim Gunn
- Robin Roberts
- Louise Roe

2013

- Kristin Chenoweth
- Kelly Rowland
- Lara Spencer
- Robin Roberts
- Jess Cagle

2014

- Jess Cagle
- Lara Spencer
- Robin Roberts
- Tyson Beckford

2015

- Jess Cagle
- Robin Roberts
- Lara Spencer
- Michael Strahan
- Joe Zee

2016

- Jess Cagle
- Amy Robach
- Robin Roberts
- Lara Spencer
- Michael Strahan
- Joe Zee

2017

- Jess Cagle
- Robin Roberts
- Michael Strahan
- Lara Spencer
- Nina Garcia
- Krista Smith

2018

- Michael Strahan
- Wendi McLendon-Covey
- Sara Haines
- Krista Smith
- Dave Karger

2019

- Ashley Graham
- Maria Menounos
- Elaine Welteroth
- Billy Porter
- Ryan Seacrest

2020

- Lily Aldridge
- Tamron Hall
- Elvis Mitchell
- Billy Porter
- Ryan Seacrest

2021

- Ariana DeBose
- Lil Rel Howery

2022

- Vanessa Hudgens
- Terrence J
- Brandon Maxwell
- Sofia Carson
- Dave Karger

2023

- Vanessa Hudgens
- Ashley Graham
- Lilly Singh
- Reece Feldman
- Rocsi Diaz
- Dave Karger

2024

- Vanessa Hudgens
- Julianne Hough

2025

- Julianne Hough
- Jesse Palmer

2026

- Tamron Hall
- Jesse Palmer

== Title ==
The title has changed throughout the years. Most recently, from the 75th Academy Awards until the 78th Academy Awards, the pre-show was titled "Oscar Countdown". The following year, at the 79th Academy Awards, it was titled "Road to the Oscars". At the 80th Academy Awards, 81st Academy Awards, and 82nd Academy Awards, the pre-show was titled "Oscars Red Carpet". Each title used throughout the years has featured the year of the ceremony with it. Since the 83rd Academy Awards, the pre-show has been titled The Oscars Red Carpet Live.

== TV Ratings ==
- 1990: [Barbara Walters Special: 28.5 million; 8pm]
- 2002: 26 million (8pm) [Barbara Walters Special: 17 million; 7pm]
- Oscar Countdown 2003 (March): 19.5 (7:30pm) [ABC News Special: 11.4 million; 7pm]
- Oscar Countdown 2004: 17.3 rating (8pm) [Barbara Walters Special: 8.9 rating; 7pm]
- Oscar Countdown 2005: 27.7 million viewers (8pm)
- 2007: 27.1 million (8pm) [Barbara Walters Special: 14.5 million; 7pm]
- 2008: 21.5 million (8pm) [Barbara Walters Special: 11.7 million; 7pm]
- 2009: 24.4 million (8pm) [Barbara Walters Special: 11.5 million; 7pm]
- 2010 (March): 25.3 million (8pm) [Barbara Walters Special: 15 million; 7pm]
- 2011: 26.605 million (8pm)
- 2012: 12.6 (7pm); 16.6 million (7:30pm); 24.1 million (8pm)
- 2013: 12.4 million (7pm); 16.5 million (7:30pm); 25.5 million (8pm)
- 2014 (March): 14.8 million (7pm); 18.7 million (7:30pm); 26.9 million (8pm)
- 2015: 12.94 million (7pm); 16.93 million (7:30pm); 23.81 million (8pm)

== See also ==
- List of Academy Awards ceremonies
