= Pud Cusack =

American sound engineer

- Occupation: Sound engineer
- Years active: 1988 – present

Pud Cusack is an American sound engineer. She was nominated for an Academy Award in the category Best Sound for the film The Mask of Zorro. She has worked on more than 50 films since 1988.

== Selected filmography ==
- The Mask of Zorro (1998)
