= Stuart Robertson (visual effects artist) =

American visual effects artist

- Occupation: Visual effects artist

Stuart Robertson is an American visual effects artist. He won an Academy Award in the category Best Visual Effects for the film What Dreams May Come.

== Selected filmography ==
- What Dreams May Come (1998; co-won with Joel Hynek, Nicholas Brooks and Kevin Mack)
