= Tavriiske, Zaporizhzhia Raion, Zaporizhzhia Oblast =

Tavriiske Таврійське Scheromet, Sheromet
- Village
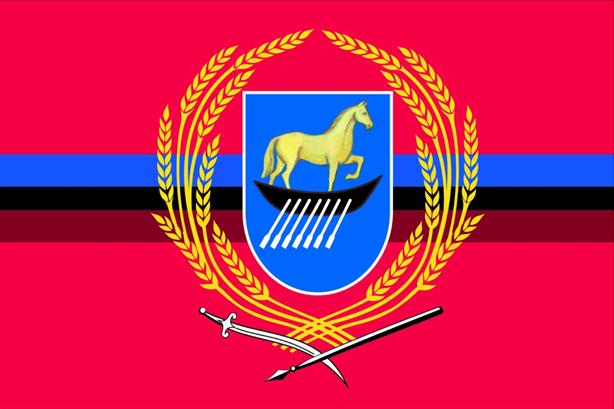
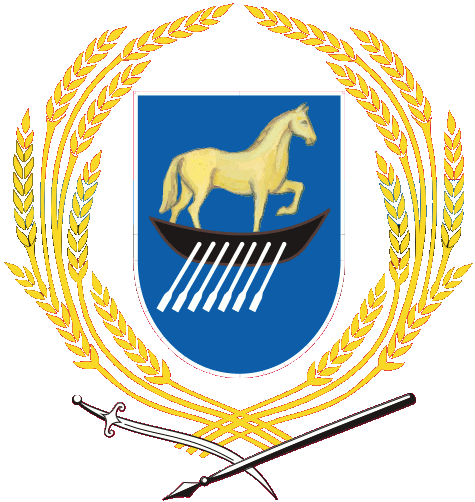
- Flag Coat of arms

- Location within Zaporizhzhia Oblast Location within Ukraine
- Coordinates: 47°39′10″N 35°41′51″E
- Country: Ukraine
- Oblast: Zaporizhzhia Oblast
- Raion: Zaporizhzhia Raion
- Hromada: Tavriiske rural hromada

Area
  - Total: 13,205 km^{2} (5,098 sq mi)
- Elevation: 41 m (135 ft)

Population (2025)
  - Total: 2,338
  - Estimate (2026): 50
  - Density: 0.1771/km^{2} (0.4586/sq mi)
- Time zone: UTC+2 (EET)
  - Summer (DST): UTC+3 (EEST)
- Postal code: 70540
- Area code: +380 6141

Tavriiske (Ukrainian: Таврійське) is a village in Ukraine. Scheromet was the German name of a village which was settled by Hutterites from 1868 to 1874, when the Hutterites left for Canada.

== Geography ==
Tavriiske is located on the right bank of the Konka River, opposite the village Yurkivka (Юрківка) and on the Territorial Road T-08-03. The village is the administrative center of a district municipality in the center of Zaporizhzhia District, located about 50 km southeast of Zaporizhzhia Oblast center Zaporizhzhia and 14 km northwest of the district center Orikhiv.

== History ==
Incorporated in 1798, the village developed from a farm that was founded in 1770. It then bore the name Zherebets (Жеребець) until 1939, then the name Kirove (Ukrainian: Кірове; Russian: Кирово, Kirovo) until 12 May 2016 when it was renamed to the current name to comply with decommunization in Ukraine. The village has a railway station on the railway line Zaporizhzhia–Polohy.
