= New York Rock & Roll Ensemble =

American rock band, 1968–1973

The New York Rock & Roll Ensemble was a rock band active in the late 1960s and early 1970s, whose music was described as "classical baroque rock". The group performed wearing classical musician's attire, white tie and tailcoat (not tuxedo).

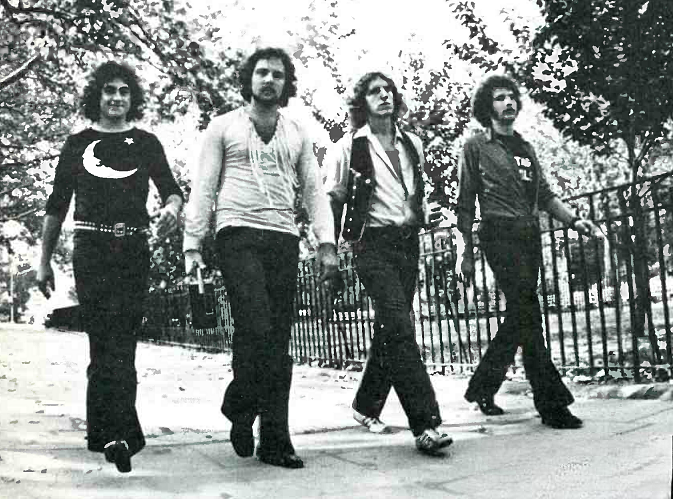
The New York Rock & Roll Ensemble in the January 16, 1971 issue of Cash Box

== History ==
The band was formed by three Juilliard students Michael Kamen, Marty Fulterman (now known as Mark Snow) and Dorian Rudnytsky, plus two rock musicians Brian Corrigan and Clif Nivison.

Rudnytsky said that while they were students at Juilliard, Kamen and Fulterman played in a rock band named "Emil & The Detectives" (named after the Erich Kästner novel) while he played in a rock band named Invicta with Corrigan and Nivison, all of whom hailed from Toms River, New Jersey. A mutual friend and record producer suggested that all five drop their current bands and form a new combo. After the new group's first gig at a Juilliard Halloween dance in 1967, they were signed by Atlantic Records where Ahmet Ertegün was quoted by one of the members as having said in jest, "You play all the right notes on all the wrong instruments."

Their recording debut was the 1968 eponymous album The New York Rock & Roll Ensemble, which broke the norm by using classical music instruments in rock songs and rock instruments in classical pieces. This fusion, daring at the time, impressed Leonard Bernstein who invited the group to appear at one of his Young People's Concerts with the New York Philharmonic Orchestra, where they performed their signature song "Brandenburg", based on the first movement of Bach's Fifth Brandenburg Concerto. This track showed the group at their best, starting off as a straight rendition featuring two oboes, guitar and cello, then transitioning into a rock tune, while continuing to use Bach's musical foundation.

Because Brandenburg was the song that showed the widest range of their musicianship, the group typically performed that song at television appearances on The Tonight Show, The Steve Allen Show and other TV shows of that era.

Brandenburg appeared on the group's second album Faithful Friends, which had improved production since their first and contained many of the songs that were part of their live act.

Their third album, Reflections, was recorded prior to Faithful Friends. It was a collaboration with Greek composer Manos Hatzidakis on a film score that was never produced. The group decided to release this already recorded music as their last Atlantic album. Because Reflections was such a departure from their "classical/rock" roots, it apparently sold poorly when released and at least one member of the group believed that it hurt their popularity by confusing their fan base. This album became the group's best selling album after it was re-released in Europe. In 2005 the Greek band Raining Pleasure released its own interpretation of this album.

Rhythm guitarist Brian Corrigan departed after the third album, and the only movie appearance by the group in Zachariah which featured an extended version of Kamen's song "Gravedigger". The band then shortened its name to New York Rock Ensemble and switched to Columbia Records. Released in 1971, Roll Over was their most overtly rock style album and their biggest seller yet. One of the songs on it is "Fields of Joy", covered by Lenny Kravitz in 1991 for his album Mama Said. The band's tour to support this album expanded on their usual college events, by playing with symphony orchestras across the country including the Boston Pops and the St. Louis Symphony Orchestra. During these gigs the group would play a solo set and then join with the orchestra to perform an orchestral version of Kamen's rock song "Anaconda," and his "Winter Child", based on the Aria from Bach's Goldberg Variations. Kamen's orchestral composition and rock-orchestral fusion set the stage for his later work as a movie composer as well as a composer, conductor and performer with Metallica, Eric Clapton and Pink Floyd. Kamen also toured with David Bowie supporting the Diamond Dogs album.

Their last album was Freedomburger in 1972. Soon after the tour supporting this album, the band dispersed.

Kamen, joined by Rudnytsky and other musicians, gave it one last try when he released New York Rock in 1973. "Winter Child" appears on that album. Band membership at this time was Kamen and Rudnytsky, joined by David Sanborn on saxophone, Larry Packer (formerly of Cat Mother and the All Night News Boys) on guitar and violin, Dennis Whitted (later of Paul Butterfield and Bonnie Raitt) on drums and Hank DeVito (later of Emmylou Harris' "Hot Band") on pedal steel.

Michael Kamen later achieved fame for his many film scores and his "fusion" work. He died in 2003.

Marty Fulterman adopted the name Mark Snow and gained renown for his scores and themes for TV shows, particularly The X Files. He died in 2025

== Discography ==
- The New York Rock & Roll Ensemble (1968), released as CD in 2005
- Faithful Friends (1969), released as CD in 2006
- Reflections (1970), released as CD in 2000
- Zachariah (Movie soundtrack, VHS, DVD 1970)
- Roll Over (1971), released as CD in 1999
  - "Fields of Joy" (single)
- Different Strokes (Columbia Records Various Artists Collection 1971)
- Freedomburger (1972), released as CD in 1999
- New York Rock (1973), a Michael Kamen solo album released as CD in 2010
- various singles

== Initial lineup ==
- Michael Kamen – keyboards, oboe, vocals
- Μartin Fulterman – drums, oboe
- Βrian Corrigan – rhythm guitar, vocals
- Clifton Νivison – lead guitar, vocals
- Dorian Rudnytsky – bass guitar, cello
