= Miriam Dalmazio =

Italian actress (born 1987)

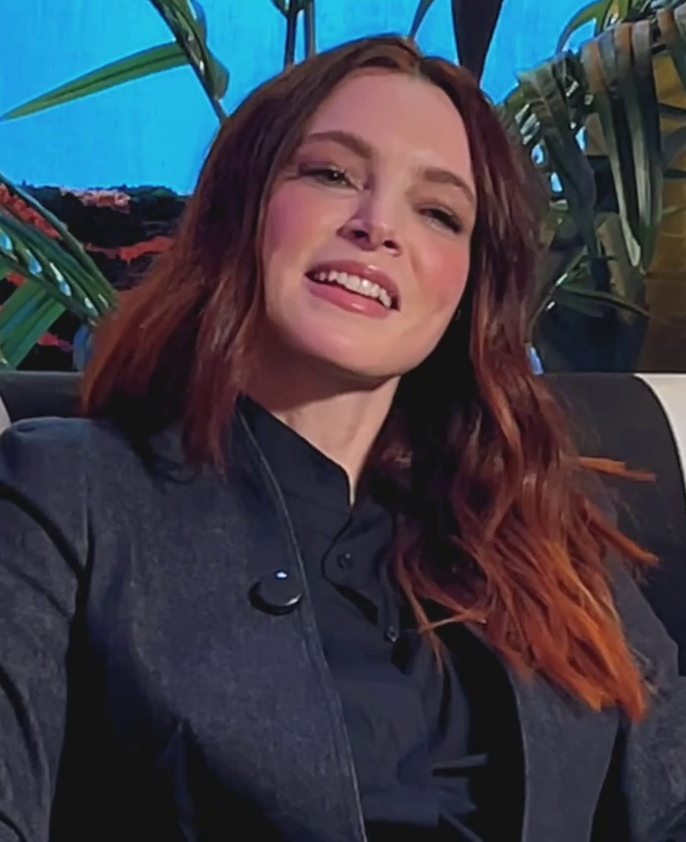
- Born: 14 September 1987 (age 38); Palermo, Italy
- Occupation: Actress
- Years active: 2006–present

Miriam Dalmazio (born 14 September 1987) is an Italian actress.

== Early life and career ==
Born in Palermo in the Noce neighbourhood, she graduated at Centro sperimentale di cinematografia in Rome and started acting in the soap opera Agrodolce.

After taking part in the cast of some television productions, she gets the first role of a certain importance in the fiction Che Dio ci aiuti, where she plays - in the first, second and third season - the shy and awkward doctor Margherita Morbidelli, a girl from the province who moved in the boarding school run by Sister Angela for study reasons. She appeared with Checco Zalone in a 2013 Italian comedy film Sole a catinelle directed by Gennaro Nunziante, the second highest-grossing Italian film in Italy.

== Filmography ==
=== Television ===
Year	Title	Role	Notes
2011	Come un delfino	Giusy	2 episodes
2011–2017	Che Dio ci aiuti	Margherita Morbidelli	Main role (seasons 1–3), guest star (season 4); 53 episodes
2012	Il paese delle piccole piogge	Irene	Television movie
2012	Marry Me	Matisse	Main role; 6 episodes
2016	Inspector Montalbano	Teresita Guadenzio	Episode: "Una faccenda delicata"
2017	Squadra mobile	Cecilia La Rosa	Main role (season 2); 14 episodes
2018, 2020	La vita promessa	Rosa Canuto	Recurring role; 6 episodes
2018	Medici	Bona of Savoy	Recurring role; 8 episodes
2018–2021	Cacciatore: The Hunter	Giada Stranzi	Main role; 24 episodes
2019	La stagione della caccia - C'era una volta Vigata	Antonietta Peluso	Television movie
2021	Leonardo	Beatrice d'Este	Recurring role; 4 episodes
2021	Anna	Ginevra	2 episodes
2022	Studio Battaglia	Nina Battaglia	Main role; 8 episodes
2024	Costanza	Costanza	Main role; 8 episodes

=== Films ===
Year	Title	Role	Notes
2013	Sole a catinelle	Daniela Parisi	
2014	Maldamore	Beba	
2014	A Woman as a Friend	Giulia	
2015	Wondrous Boccaccio	Fiammetta	
2016	Caffè	Gaia	
2021	Il mio corpo vi seppellirà	Errè	
2021	Appunti di un venditore di donne	Carla	
