= Quo vado? =

2016 Italian comedy film

- Directed by: Gennaro Nunziante
- Screenplay by: Checco Zalone; Gennaro Nunziante
- Story by: Checco Zalone; Gennaro Nunziante
- Produced by: Pietro Valsecchi
- Starring: Checco Zalone; Eleonora Giovanardi; Sonia Bergamasco
- Cinematography: Vittorio Omodei Zorini
- Edited by: Pietro Morana
- Music by: Checco Zalone
- Production companies: TaoDue, Medusa Film
- Distributed by: Medusa Film
- Release date: 1 January 2016
- Running time: 86 minutes
- Country: Italy
- Language: Italian
- Budget: €10 million
- Box office: €65.3 million ($75.8 million)

Quo vado? (Latin: Where am I going?) is a 2016 Italian comedy film directed by Gennaro Nunziante. It was released on 1 January 2016. The film is the second highest-grossing Italian film in Italy.

== Plot ==
Checco was born into a life of relative comfort and privilege among his peers in a small town of Apulia. He is one of the lucky few to have a posto fisso, or guaranteed job as a public servant. When a new reformist government vows to cut down on bureaucracy, Checco is forced to accept ever-worsening public-sector postings in order to maintain his guaranteed pay, benefits, and lifetime employment and continue to put in little effort and accept bribes. Dr. Sironi, a representative of the new government, is tasked with downsizing the public sector by offering buyouts to targeted government employees in exchange for their resignation (see constructive dismissal). She takes a special interest in Checco who eventually becomes the last resilient holdout; no matter what hellish place he is appointed to, he finds rays of hope and won't surrender his public employee status.

Sironi sends Checco to various seemingly unpleasant locations only for Checco to find a way to continue his antics and make the best of each situation. In a final attempt to erode his willpower, Sironi appoints him to the Italian arctic research station as a hunter to protect the team. Checco initially wants to resign, but changes his decision when he falls in love with Valeria, a coworker. During vacation, Checco, visits Valeria where she lives in Norway and finds out that she has three children. He is also introduced to a whole new way of life. He becomes enchanted with the politeness and the aspects of a progressive, eco-centric society. However, he finds Norway's winter season depressing; he becomes homesick and misses Italian cuisine and culture. Checco and Valeria manage to move to Italy. Checco seems happy with his new job, but Valeria fails to adjust to the demanding living situation which requires compromises and bribery. Fed up, Valeria leaves Italy and Checco gets his permanent position back in his hometown. Later he receives news that Valeria is pregnant with his child in South Africa. Checco goes to South Africa, but Valeria is displeased with Checco's decision to juggle both the responsibilities of fatherhood and the posto fisso. Checco chooses to let go of his secure job, uses the money from Sironi to buy vaccines for an African medical camp and restarts his life as Valeria's helper.

== Cast ==
- Checco Zalone as Checco Zalone
  - Federico Ielapi as Checco Zalone (child)
- Eleonora Giovanardi as Valeria Nobili
- Sonia Bergamasco as Dr. Sironi
- Maurizio Micheli as Peppino, Checco's father
- Ludovica Modugno as Caterina, Checco's mother
- Ninni Bruschetta as Minister Magno
- Pippo Crotti as Massimo
- Paolo Pierobon as a scientific researcher at the North Pole
- Lino Banfi as Senator Nicola Binetto
- Azzurra Martino as Penelope, Checco's girlfriend
- Nicola Ciccariello as Fanelli
- Gianni D'Addario as Tommaso
- Emmanuel Dabone as Kato
- Doh Zeyenouin Rufin as Dogon
- Vincenzo Pirrotta as the mayor of Castrovizzo
- Diego Verdegiglio as Sironi's secretary
- Stefano Grillo as Don Michele Vannucci
- Giuseppe Piarulli as Liuzzi
- Adam Nour Marino as Said
- Angela Jehrzy Napa as Emily
- Massimiliano Ray Montgomery as Lars

== Release ==
Quo Vado? was released in Italy on 1 January 2016 by Medusa Distribuzione.

The film was released in the United Kingdom by Vue Cinemas on 22 April 2016, and in Australia and New Zealand by Palace Films as Where am I Going? on 13 October 2016.

== Reception ==
The film grossed $75.8 million worldwide. It opened with a record €22.2 million, and grossed €65.3 million becoming and currently the highest grossing Italian film in Italy, surpassing the record set by Zalone and Nunziante's 2013 film, Sole a catinelle.

Its largest markets outside Italy were Spain ($2.9 million, becoming the third highest-grossing opening), Australia ($545,966), Argentina ($256,856), Uruguay ($120,804), Portugal ($85,961) and Russia ($76,555).

== Remake ==
In 2022, a French remake of the film directed and performed by Jérôme Commandeur was released: Employee of the Month (Irréductible).

== Cultural importance ==
The popularity of the film has led to a 23 percent increase in Italian visitors to Bergen, Norway in 2016. The Italian Prime Minister at the time, Matteo Renzi, attended the release of 'Quo Vado?' with his family in theaters. The Italian Minister of Culture Dario Franceschini tweeted that Quo Vado? is "good for all of Italian cinema" Quo Vado? aims for relatablility by depicting national stereotypes and common anxieties. The film's main character Checco makes many sexist statements in order to remind the viewer of the progress Italy has made. Quo Vado? highlights the anxieties felt by many Italians due to the instability of the private sector. The way that Checco clings to the security and benefits of his posto fisso is reflective of these fears.
