= Tolo Tolo =

- The poster of the movie.
- Directed by: Checco Zalone
- Screenplay by: Checco Zalone, Paolo Virzì
- Story by: Checco Zalone, Paolo Virzì
- Produced by: Pietro Valsecchi
- Starring: Checco Zalone; Souleymane Sylla; Manda Touré
- Edited by: Pietro Morana
- Music by: Checco Zalone
- Production company: TaoDue
- Release date: January 1, 2020
- Running time: 90 minutes
- Country: Italy
- Language: Italian
- Budget: €20 million
- Box office: $52.2 million

Tolo Tolo is a 2020 Italian comedy film directed by and starring Checco Zalone, in his directorial debut.

The film grossed €46.2 million ($52.2 million) and became the fifth highest-grossing film of all time in Italy, and the 21st highest-grossing film of 2020.

== Plot ==
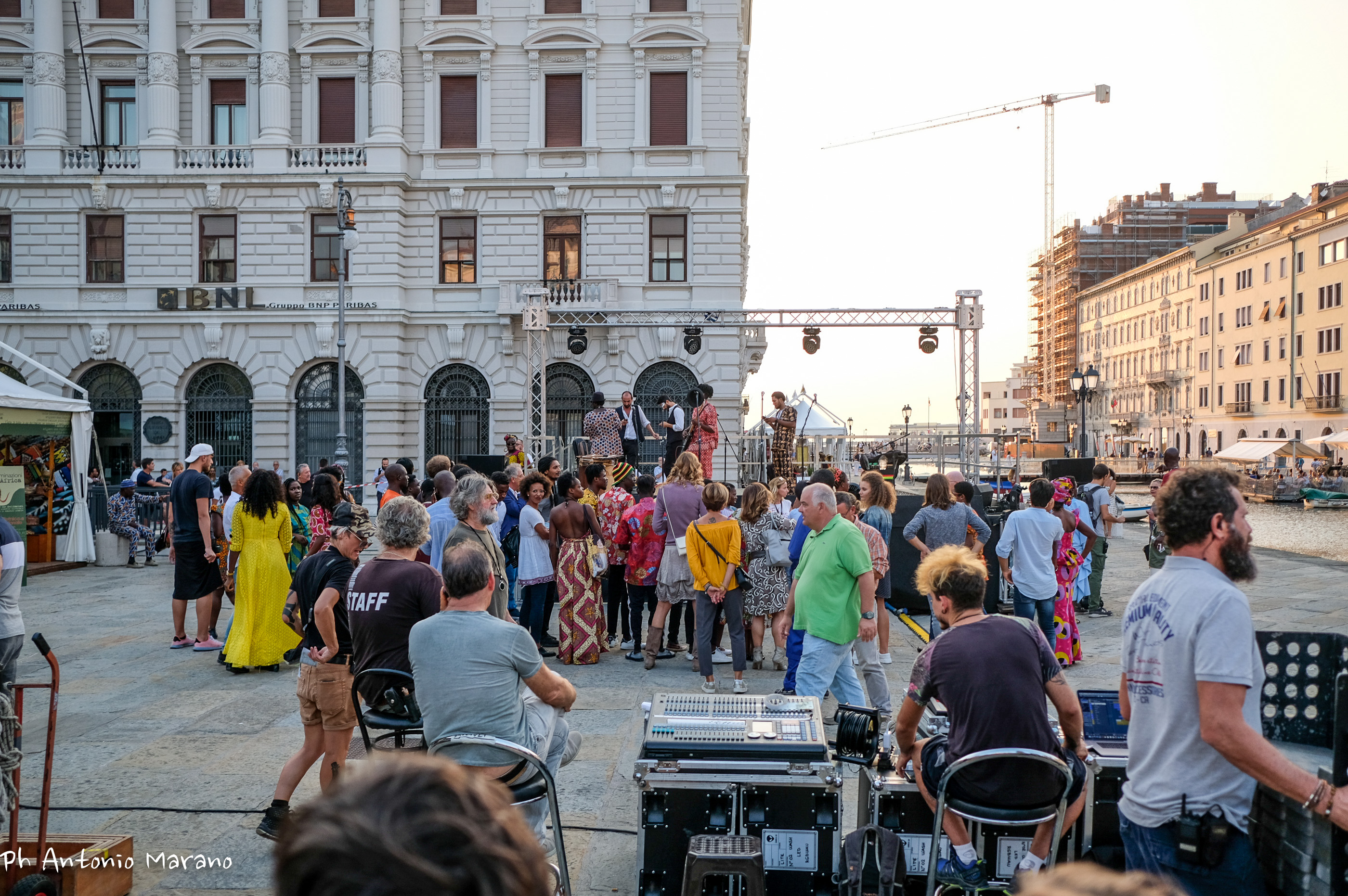
Set construction of Tolo Tolo in 2019 in Trieste, Italy

Checco is a young Apulian entrepreneur dreamer who has opened a sushi restaurant in his town Spinazzola. However, after one month, the restaurant goes bankrupt and he chooses to emigrate to Africa to escape from debt. Here he adapts to being a waiter in a resort in Kenya, but at the outbreak of a civil war he decides to embark on a stowaway trip on a boat for migrants to Europe and chooses to do it with his African friends. However, he would not like to return to Italy, but rather to go to Liechtenstein where banking secrecy is in force and there is a lower tax burden than in Italy.

== Cast ==
- Checco Zalone as Pierfrancesco "Checco" Zalone
- Souleymane Sylla as Oumar
- Manda Touré as Idjaba
- Nassor Said Birya as Doudou
- Barbara Bouchet as Mrs. Inge
- Alexis Michalik as Alexandre Lemaitre
- Arianna Scommegna as Nunzia
- Antonella Attili as Mrs. Lella
- Gianni D'Addario as Gramegna
- Nicola Nocella as Lawyer Russo
- Diletta Acquaviva as Barbara (second wife)
- Maurizio Bousso as Boy in Agadez
- Sara Putignano as Nicla (first wife)
- Nicola Di Bari as Uncle Nicola
- Ira Fronten as Maitresse Agadez
- Badara Seck

Additionally, Nichi Vendola, Enrico Mentana, and Massimo Giletti appear as themselves.

== Reception ==
The film opened with a record-breaking first day gross of €8.7 million, surpassing the previous record achieved by Quo Vado? (2016), in which Checco Zalone had also starred in. By 8 March 2020, the film had grossed €46 million when cinemas in Italy were closed due to the coronavirus lockdown. The film was less well-received than Zalone's previous feature film efforts, with criticisms being aimed at the inconsistent script, direction and the film being less funny, though praising the attempt at discussing a more socially relevant topic.

== See also ==
- List of highest-grossing films in Italy
- European migrant crisis
- Migrants' African routes
