= Anna Rita Del Piano =

Italian actress and theater director (born 1966)

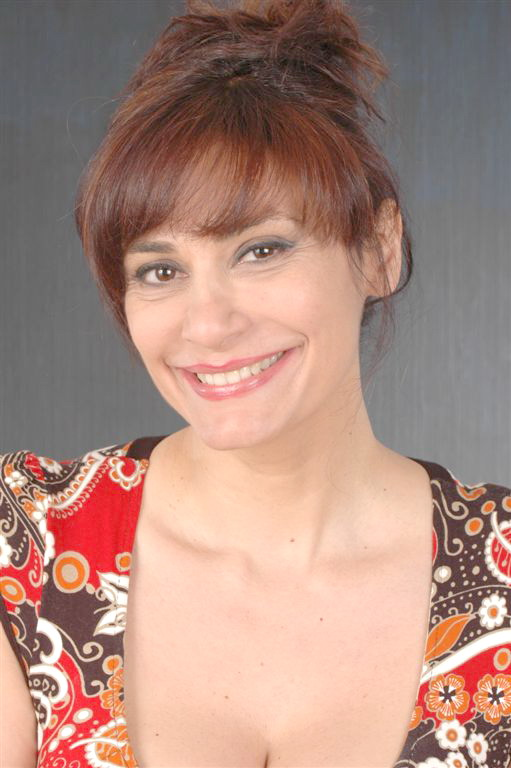
- Born: Anna Rita Viapiano; 26 July 1966 (age 60); Cassano delle Murge, Apulia, Italy
- Occupations: Actress, theater director
- Years active: 1993–present
- Height: 1.72 m (5 ft 8 in)

Anna Rita Del Piano, real name Anna Rita Viapiano (born 26 July 1966, in Cassano delle Murge), is an Italian actress and theater director.

== Biography ==
Anna Rita Viapiano was born in Cassano delle Murge, where she lived his childhood; later she moved with her family to Matera where she started her first artistic studies with the ballet and then started actively interested in theater when she was a little over 14 years, attending Enrico Annecchino's laboratories, "Hermes" by Emilio Andrisani and "Teatro dei Sassi" always in Matera led by Massimo Lanzetta and Loredana Paolicelli. Performances continue dividing between dance and music troupe of Tirambo Lino Cavallo. Continues her studies graduating to Niccolò Piccinni in Bari as a dancer performs in 1984 with master Momcilo Borojevic and works in the Dancemania dance company of Venosa with dancer Tani Viti. She graduated at the University of Urbino Isef with honors and enrolled at the Conservatorio musicale Egidio Romualdo Duni of Matera.

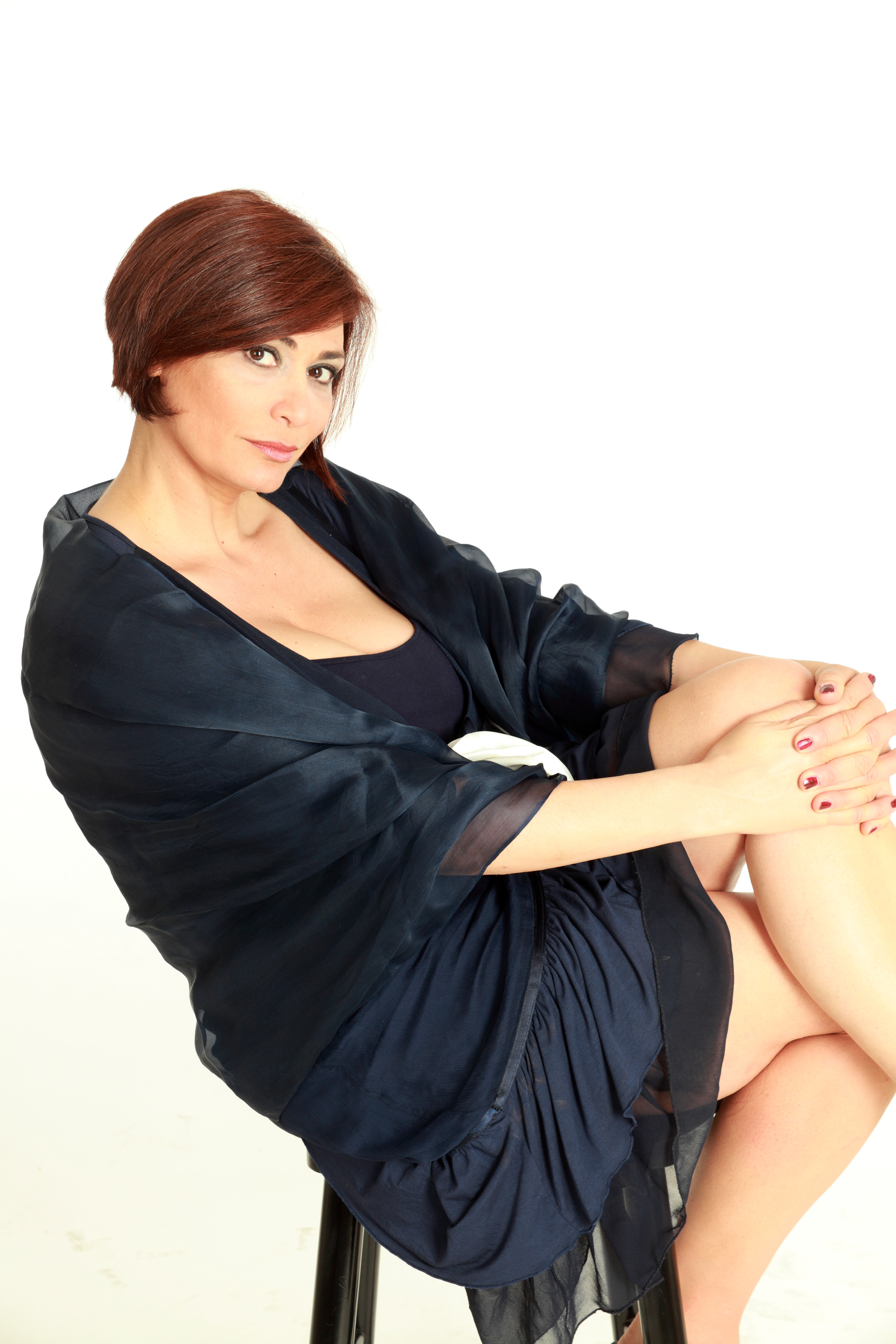

Her first contact with the cinema world is the participation in 1993 in the movie The Star Maker by Giuseppe Tornatore while she was in Matera, where she was offered a small part.

The encounter with Tornatore marks her beginning with the seventh art since shortly after the shooting to Rome to attend different schools of cinema. The first television job as a television actress in 1996 is The Fourth King of Stefano Reali in the role of a beautiful leprous, and then working in other fiction as Ultimo, Valeria medico legale and una donna per amico. In 2000 has a co-starring role in the TV drama "Le Ali della Vita" and "Le Ali della Vita 2" with Sabrina Ferilli and Virna Lisi, where she plays the role of sister Celestina. The following year she co-starred with fiction Maria Goretti and L'Uomo sbagliato.

As a movie actress holds, among others, the role of the social worker in the movie Le bande by Lucio Giordano and the ticket lady in Focaccia blues by Nico Cirasola and Che bella giornata by Checco Zalone.

In 2012 the actress Anna Rita Del Piano back to Cassano delle Murge in the guise of Director to present his latest production "Parigi nell'Anno del Signore" (into English: "Paris in the year of the Lord" .

== Filmography ==
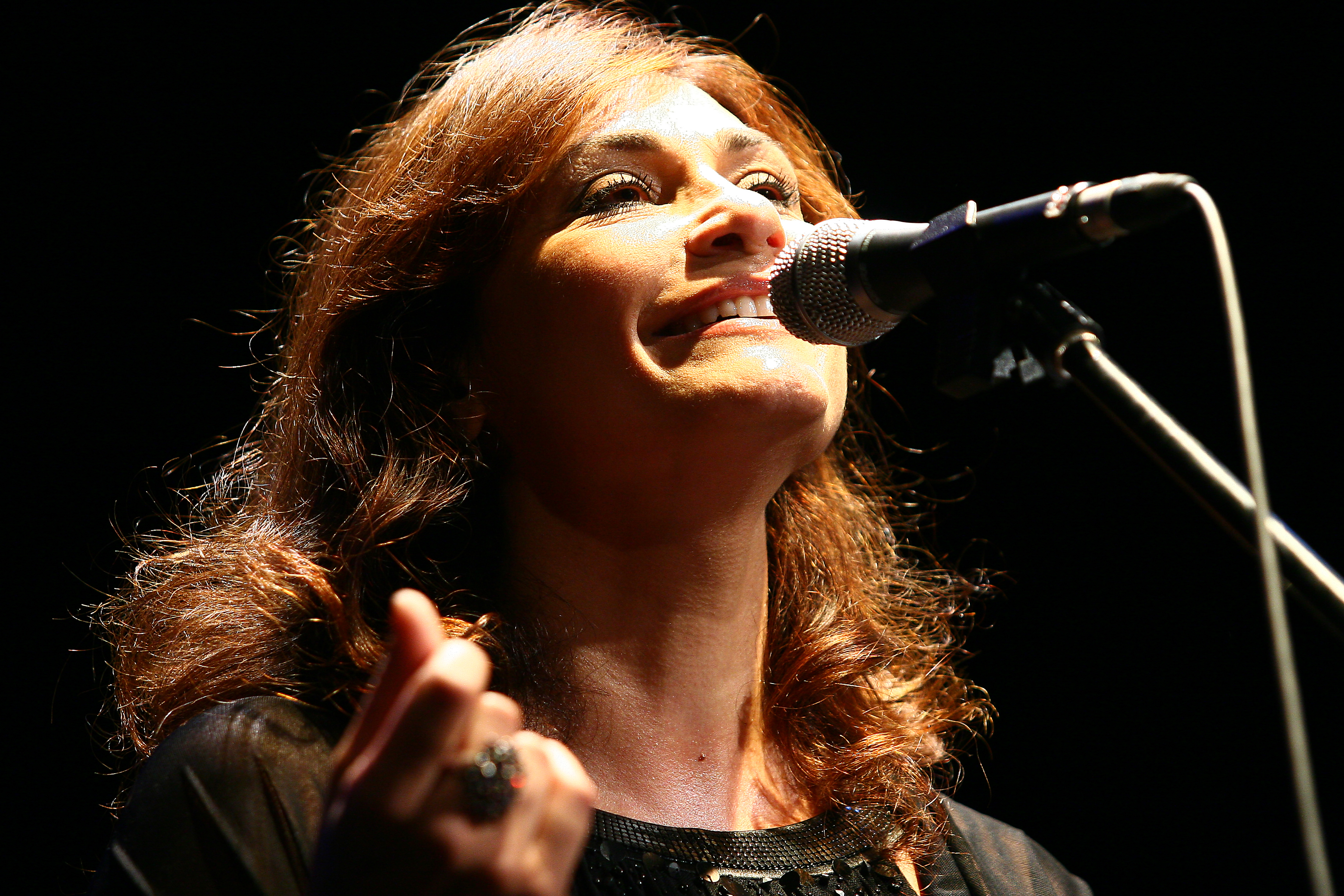
Anna Rita Del Piano during a performance for a Concerto Tribute to Maestro Ennio Morricone in 2008

=== Cinema ===
- La balia, regia di Marco Bellocchio, ruolo: capo-balia (1998)
- Senza movente di Luciano Odorisio, ruolo: Anna (1999)
- I terrazzi di Stefano Reali, ruolo: Amanda (2000)
- Il tramite di Stefano Reali, ruolo: madre di Rollo (2002)
- La signora di Francesco Laudadio, ruolo Presidente Croce Rossa (2002)
- Tornare indietro di Renzo Badolisani, ruolo: madre di Rocco (2002)
- Le bande di Lucio Giordano, ruolo: protagonista (2005)
- Amore 14 di Federico Moccia, ruolo: fioraia (2009)
- Focaccia Blues di Nico Cirasola, ruolo: cassiera del cinema (2009)
- L’uomo Nero di Sergio Rubini ruolo: Vedova Pavone (2009)
- Che bella giornata di Gennaro Nunziante, ruolo: Madre di Checco Zalone (2010)
- Il Tempo che Tiene di Francesco Marino ruolo: Isabella (2010)
- E la chiamano Estate di Paolo Franchi, ruolo: prostituta (2011)
- Operazione vacanze di Claudio Fragasso, ruolo: Vanessa(2011)
- Quando il sole sorgerà di Andrea Manicone, ruolo: Anna (2011)
- Una vita da sogno di Domenico Costanzo, ruolo: Giovanna (2011)
- Cinema Italia di Antonio Domenici ruolo: Anna (2012)
- Outing “Fidanzati per sbaglio” di Matteo Vicino, ruolo: Madre di Riccardo (2012)

=== Television ===
- Il quarto re, regia di Stefano Reali, ruolo la bella prostituta lebbrosa (1996)
- Ama il tuo nemico regia di Damiano Damiani, ruolo: moglie boss mafioso (1997)
- Non lasciamoci più regia di Vittorio Sindoni, ruolo: prostituta e protagonista della puntata (1998)
- Ultimo regia di Stefano Reali, ruolo moglie del Boss (1998)
- Lui e Lei regia di Luciano Mannuzzi, ruolo: medico chirurgo (1999)
- Valeria medico legale regia di G. Lazzotti, ruolo: protagonista di puntata(1999)
- Le ali della vita regia di Stefano Reali ruolo: sorella Celestina-coprotagonista (2000)
- Sei forte, maestro regia di U.F. Giordani e A. Manni, ruolo: prot. di puntata (2000)
- Una donna per amico regia di Rossella Izzo ruolo: Caposala, coprotagonista (2000)
- Le ali della vita 2 regia di Stefano Reali, ruolo: Sorella Celestina, coprotagonista (2001)
- Don Matteo regia di Giulio Base, ruolo: Rossana, protagonista di puntata (2003)
- La Squadra regia di G.Leacche ruolo: madre di Filippo (2003)
- Orgoglio 2 regia di Giorgio Serafini, ruolo: Rosaria, protagonista di puntata (2004)
- San Pietro regia di Giulio Base, ruolo: Flaminia (2004)
- La Freccia Nera regia di Fabrizio Costa ruolo: prostituta (2005)
- Butta la luna regia di Vittorio Sindoni, ruolo: Ispettrice di Polizia (2005)
- Colpi di sole regia di Irish Braschi ruolo: Marta (2006)
- La terza verità regia di Stefano Reali, ruolo: Avvocatessa (2007)
- Provaci ancora prof directed by Rossella Izzo, ruolo: tobacco store (2008)
- La mia casa è piena di specchi regia di Vittorio Sindoni, ruolo: Moglie regista fotoromanzi
- Distretto di Polizia regia di A. Ferrari ruolo: Agente Caterina Cominelli (2011)

== Theater ==
- Zapping regia di L. Cecinelli commedia musicale con Olimpia Di Nardo (1996)
- Anche al Boss piace Caldo regia di S. Ammirata (1997)
- SPQR - Se Parlasse Questa Roma regia di F. Fiorentini (1997)
- Tu sai che io so che tu sai (Estate romana) F. Fiorentini (1997)
- La Corona Rubata regia di Raffaella Panichi (1998)
- Molly and Dedalus tratto da Ulisse di Joyce regia di P. Di Marca (1998)
- Parsifal regia di D. Valmaggi (1998)
- Strano, Stranissimo anzi Normale commedia musicale, regia di V. Boffoli (2004)
- Lo scherzo regia di A. Zito, ruolo: protagonista (1999)
- Un Viaggio chiamato Amore regia di Michele Placido (2002)
- Orfeo agli Inferi operetta regia di L. Cavallo (2003)
- Pierino e il Lupo opera musicale dal M. A .Murzi, ruolo: protagonista (2003)
- Giravoce regia di L .Monti con Daniele Formica, ruolo: protagonista (2004)
- Recital Cesira tratto dal romanzo “La Ciociara” con musiche di A.Pelusi (2004)
- Souvenir dell’operetta regia di L. Cavallo (2004)
- Yerma e le Altre regia di D.Ferri e G.Mazzeo, ruolo: Medea-coprotagonista (2005)
- Ruzantimando regia di Nino Fausti ruolo: Gnua-protagonista (2006)
- Casa Bardi nascita del Melodramma regia di Stefano Dionisi(2007)
- Edipo Re regia di Pino Cormani ruolo: Giocasta (2007)
- Operina Rock regia di M.Inversi e musiche di C.Gangarella, ruolo: protagonista
- Camerata Bardi da C. Monteverdi ad A. Morricone regia di Claudio Insegno (Teatro Nazionale) (2008)
- Casa di Bernarada Alba regia di Daniela Ferri, ruolo: Ponzia (2008)
- Due Cose Amare e una Dolce regia di Buch Morris (Museo Arti e Trad.Popolari) (2008)
- Ruzzantimando regia di Nino Fausti ruolo: Gnua (2008)
- Arie di Napoli regia di Pino Cormani (2009)
- Ombretenue omaggio a Billie Holiday regia di Rosi Giordano, ruolo: protagonista (2009)
- Monologo “Portapporta” Premio Fiorenzo Fiorentini ”Amore per Roma” (Finalista) (2010)
- “Come prendere 2 piccioni con una fava” regia di L. Manna, ruolo: Concetta (2011)
- “Nulla è Cambiato” da un testo di Paola Aspri regia di Rosi Giordano, ruolo: Angela-Astrologa (2011)

=== Short films ===
- I Vampiri non esistono regia di Andrea Di Luzio, ruolo: protagonista (1997)
- Chimera regia di Andrea Di Luzio, ruolo: protagonista (1999)
- Indimenticabile regia di M .Terranova, ruolo: coprotagonista (1999)
- Con Amore……Rossana regia di P .Boshi e F. Calligari (2000)
- Accadde la notte di Halloween regia di Maria Pia Cerulo, ruolo: protagonista (2001)
- Il Posto Vuoto (Scuola nazionale di cinema) di A .Quadretti, ruolo: coprotagonist (2004)
- Ah! L’Amore regia di L. Nocella, ruolo: protagonista (2004)
- Attrici regia di Arce Andres Maldonado, ruolo coprotagonista (2005)
- La lavanderia regia di B. Melappioni, ruolo: coprotagonista (2005)
- Dual Band regia di Andrea Di Luzio, ruolo: protagonista (2007)
- il Cadavere di Vetro regia di Massimiliano Palaia, ruolo: madre (2007)
- Non c’e Due senza Treja regia di Dario Iosimi ruolo: coprotagonista (2007)
- Come Dio Vuole regia di G. Ruggeri (2008)
- Buon Compleanno Mamma regia di Daniele Santonicola, ruolo: protagonista (2009)
- Non c’è Pace per l’ispettore Valmar regia di Marcello Trezza, ruolo: protagonista (2009)
- Il Signor Nessuno regia di Francesco Felli; ruolo: Proprietaria alberghiera in Concorso Nazionale 48 ore Corti (2012)
- Girotondo regia di Giacomo Farano ruolo: prostituta (2013)

== Publicities ==
- Infostrada with Fiorello and Mike Bongiorno (2009)
- Danacol yogurt con Rita dalla Chiesa (2011)
- Donnamag integratore minerale per tutte le donne (2012)

== Presentations ==
- Concerto per la società della SOFTLAB ROMA (2010)
- Ottava edizione del Premio Anselmo Mattei (2011)

== Theater directions ==
- Musical Grease con la Scuola di teatro per ragazzi presso il teatro Regina Pacis di Roma (2002)
- Musical Scugnizzi con la Scuola di teatro per ragazzi presso il teatro Buon Pastore di Roma (2006)
- Musical Il mago di Oz con la Scuola di teatro per ragazzi presso teatro Buon Pastore di Roma (2007)
- Musical La bella e la bestia con la Scuola di teatro per ragazzi presso teatro Montale di Roma (2008)
- Musical Rugantino con la Scuola di teatro per ragazzi presso il teatro Montale di Roma (2009)
- Musical Gian Burrasca con la Scuola di teatro per ragazzi presso il teatro Montale di Roma (2010)
- Musical Blues Brothers con la Scuola di teatro per ragazzi presso il teatro Regina Pacis di Roma
- Recital musicale Parigi nell'anno del Signore pressola chiesa di S. Maria di Cassano delle Murge (2011)
- Musical Sette spose per sette fratelli Scuola teatro ragazzi presso il Teatro Montale Roma (2012)
- Premiazione 1° premio per la categoria "Costumi" presso la Rassegna Teatrale Regionale Roma (2012)
- Premiazione 1° premio per la categoria "Interpreti" presso la Rassegna Teatrale Regionale Roma (2012)

== Awards ==
- Miglior "Attrice non protagonista" per Le ali della vita, Festival del Cinema e della Televisione (2001)
- Miglior "Attrice non protagonista" per L'uomo sbagliato, Festival del Cinema e della Televisione (2005)
- Premiazione nella selezione "Amore per Roma" omaggio a F. Fiorentini teatro Parioli (2010)
- Nomination nella categoria "Migliore attrice" per 48 ORE IN CORTO (2012)
