= The Best Summer of My Life =

- Poster
- Spanish: El mejor verano de mi vida
- Directed by: Dani de la Orden
- Written by: Marta Suárez; Daniel Castro; Olatz Arroyo
- Based on: Sole a catinelle by Gennaro Nunziante and Checco Zalone
- Produced by: Mikel Lejarza; Mercedes Gamero; Eduardo Campoy
- Starring: Leo Harlem; Toni Acosta; Maggie Civantos; Jordi Sánchez
- Cinematography: Valentín Álvarez
- Music by: Zacarías M. de la Riva
- Production companies: Álamo Audiovisual AIE; Atresmedia Cine; Álamo Producciones Audiovisuales
- Distributed by: A Contracorriente Films
- Release dates: 21 April 2018 (Málaga); 12 July 2018 (Spain)
- Country: Spain
- Language: Spanish

The Best Summer of My Life (Spanish: El mejor verano de mi vida) is a 2018 Spanish comedy film directed by Dani de la Orden starring Leo Harlem, Toni Acosta, Maggie Civantos and Jordi Sánchez together with Alejandro Serrano and Stephanie Gil. It is a remake of the 2013 Italian film Sole a catinelle by Gennaro Nunziante.

== Plot ==
Curro, a salesman, is a scoundrel with a heart of gold who promises his son Nico a holiday that he is not able to afford.

== Reparto ==
- Leo Harlem as Curro
- Toni Acosta as Daniela
- Maggie Civantos as Zoe
- Jordi Sánchez as Víctor
- Alejandro Serrano as Nico
- Isabel Ordaz as Julieta
- Stephanie Gil as Laura
- Salva Reina as Usha
- Gracia Olayo as Martirio
- Berto Romero as Rafa
- Antonio Dechent as Jorge
- Arturo Valls as Morales
- Silvia Abril as Nico's teacher
- Mariam Hernández as Alicia
- Ricardo Castella as sales director
- Nathalie Seseña as meditation teacher

== Production ==
Consisting of a remake of the 2013 Italian film Sole a catinelle (written by Gennaro Nunziante and Checco Zalone), the screenplay of The Best Summer of My Life was written by Dani de la Orden, Marta Suárez, Daniel Castro and Olatz Arroyo. Valentín Álvarez was charged with the cinematography whereas Zacarías M. de la Riva authored the score. Produced by Álamo Audiovisual, A.I.E., Atresmedia Cine, S.L. and Álamo Producciones Audiovisuales, S.L., the film was primarily shot in the island of Tenerife, the province of Toledo, Arganda del Rey and Aluche. Tenerife was used to primarily portray the fictional setting in Marbella. Only two brief aerial shots actually correspond to the latter city.

== Release ==
The film was presented at the 21st Málaga Spanish Film Festival (FCME) on 21 April 2018. Distributed by A Contracorriente Films, the film was theatrically released on 12 July 2018. The Best Summer of My Life became the third best performing Spanish film at the domestic box office in 2018, grossing circa €8 million.

== Reception ==
Raquel Hernández Luján of HobbyConsolas gave the film 78 out of 100 points, considering it to be "a fresh and white comedy, tremendously well-intentioned", highlighting Leo Harlem's performance as well as the supporting cast while negatively assessing the overly "childish" and "dumbish" dramatic side.

Manuel J. Lombardo of Diario de Sevilla wrote that the film encapsulates the comedic performance of Leo Harlem within a bland format displaying a "shameful plot" and "shoddy forms" making "any complicity with the proposal literally impossible".

Pere Vall of Fotogramas gave the film 3 out of 5 stars, highlighting Leo Harlem's performance.

Toni Vall of Cinemanía gave the film 2 out of 5 stars, writing that despite being "well directed", the film was at the service of a "forgetful insubstantiality" and that it was particularly "innocuous".

== See also ==
- List of Spanish films of 2018
