= Stefano Rosso =

Stefano Rosso may refer to:

- Stefano Rosso (singer-songwriter) (1948–2008), Italian singer-songwriter and guitarist
- Stefano Rosso (businessman) (born 1979), Italian businessman
