= Taodue =

Italian film and television production company

Taodue Film
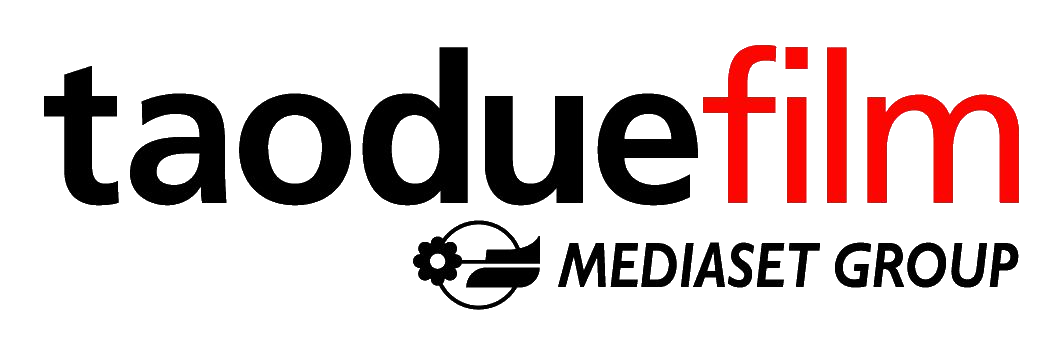
- Genre: Film
- Founded: 1991; 34 years ago
- Founder: Pietro Valsecchi; Camilla Nesbitt
- Headquarters: Rome, Italy

Taodue (stylized as taoduefilm) is an Italian film and television production company in MFE - MediaForEurope. It was founded by Pietro Valsecchi and Camilla Nesbitt in 1991.

== Filmography ==
=== Films ===
- La condanna (1991)
- La discesa di Aclà a Floristella (1992)
- Quattro bravi ragazzi (1992)
- La ribelle (1993)
- Un eroe borghese (1995)
- Testimone a rischio (1997)
- Il grande sogno (2009)
- Cado dalle nubi (2009)
- Che bella giornata (2011)
- I soliti idioti - Il film (2011)
- I due soliti idioti (2012)
- Sole a catinelle (2013)
- Amici come noi (2014)
- Chiamatemi Francesco (2015)
- Quo Vado? (2016)

=== Television movies ===
- La missione (1998)
- Il mio amico Babbo Natale (2005)
- Il mio amico Babbo Natale 2 (2006)

=== Television series ===
- Distretto di Polizia (2000–2011)
- Cuore contro cuore (2004)
- RIS Delitti Imperfetti (2005–2009)
- R.I.S. Roma – Delitti imperfetti (2010–2012)
- Crimini bianchi (2008–2009)
- I liceali (2008–2011)
- Ho sposato una sirena (2008)
- Intelligence – Servizi & segreti (2009)
- Squadra antimafia – Palermo oggi (2009–present)
- La Scimmia (2012)
- Il tredicesimo apostolo (2012–2014)
- Benvenuti a tavola - Nord vs Sud (2012–2013)
- Il clan dei camorristi (2013)
- Le mani dentro la città (2014)
- Il bosco (2015)
- Squadra Mobile (2015–present)
- Romanzo siciliano (2016–present)

=== Television miniseries ===
- Ultimo (1998)
- Ultimo - La sfida (1999)
- Uno bianca (2001)
- Francesco (St. Francis) (2001)
- Il testimone (2002)
- Il sequestro Soffiantini (2002)
- Ultima pallottola (2003)
- Doppio agguato (2003)
- Ultimo - L'infiltrato (2004)
- Paolo Borsellino (2005)
- Karol - Un uomo diventato papa (Karol: A Man Who Became Pope) (2005)
- Karol - Un papa rimasto uomo (Karol: The Pope, The Man) (2006)
- Attacco allo stato (2006)
- Nassiriya - Per non dimenticare (2007)
- Maria Montessori - Una vita per i bambini (2007)
- Il Capo dei Capi (2007)
- L'ultimo padrino (2008)
- Aldo Moro - Il presidente (2008)
- La scelta di Laura (2009)
- Ultimo 4 (2012)
- Il delitto di Via Poma (2012)
- Untitled TV series on the White Uno Gang (TBA)
