= List of 2016 box office number-one films in Italy =

The following is a list of 2016 box office number-one films in Italy.

== Number-one films ==
†	This implies the highest-grossing movie of the year.

#	Date	Film	Gross	Notes
1	3 January 2016	Quo vado? †	US$24.2 million	
2	10 January 2016	Quo vado? †	US$14.3 million	
3	17 January 2016	Quo vado? †	US$6.46 million	
4	24 January 2016	The Revenant	US$4.18 million	
5	31 January 2016	L'abbiamo fatta grossa	US$3.6 million	
6	7 February 2016	The Hateful Eight	US$3.8 million	
7	14 February 2016	Perfetti sconosciuti	US$3.7 million	
8	21 February 2016	Perfetti sconosciuti	US$3.4 million	
9	28 February 2016	Zootopia	US$3.4 million	
10	6 March 2016	Zootopia	US$2.2 million	
11	13 March 2016	The Divergent Series: Allegiant	US$1.6 million	
12	20 March 2016	Kung Fu Panda 3	US$2.6 million	
13	27 March 2016	Batman v Superman: Dawn of Justice	US$4.6 million	
14	3 April 2016	Batman v Superman: Dawn of Justice	US$1.9 million	
15	10 April 2016	The Huntsman: Winter's War	US$1.5 million	
16	17 April 2016	The Jungle Book	US$3.4 million	
17	24 April 2016	The Jungle Book	US$3.04 million	
18	1 May 2016	The Jungle Book	US$1.75 million	
19	8 May 2016	Captain America: Civil War	US$5.4 million	
20	15 May 2016	Captain America: Civil War	US$2.6 million	
21	22 May 2016	X-Men: Apocalypse	US$2 million	
22	29 May 2016	Alice Through the Looking Glass	US$2.1 million	
23	5 June 2016	Alice Through the Looking Glass	US$2 million	
24	12 June 2016	Now You See Me 2	US$1.06 million	
25	19 June 2016	The Angry Birds Movie	US$1.4 million	
26	26 June 2016	The Conjuring 2	US$1 million	
27	3 July 2016	The Conjuring 2	US$404 thousands	
28	10 July 2016	Teenage Mutant Ninja Turtles: Out of the Shadows	US$750 thousands	
29	17 July 2016	The Legend of Tarzan	US$1.5 million	
30	24 July 2016	Star Trek Beyond	US$959,882	
31	31 July 2016	Ghostbusters	US$903,484	
32	7 August 2016	Lights Out	US$604,411	
33	14 August 2016	Suicide Squad	US$2.15 million	
34	21 August 2016	Suicide Squad	US$2.97 million	
35	28 August 2016	Ice Age: Collision Course	US$4.5 million	
36	4 September 2016	Me Before You	US$2.1 million	
37	11 September 2016	Me Before You	US$1.48 million	
38	18 September 2016	Finding Dory	US$6.4 million	
39	25 September 2016	Finding Dory	US$3.5 million	
40	2 October 2016	Finding Dory	US$2.46 million	
41	9 October 2016	The Secret Life of Pets	US$5.1 million	
42	16 October 2016	Inferno	US$5.07 million	
43	23 October 2016	Inferno	US$3.08 million	
44	30 October 2016	Doctor Strange	US$2.67 million	
45	6 November 2016	The Girl on the Train	US$1.8 million	
46	13 November 2016	The Girl on the Train	US$1.25 million	
47	20 November 2016	Fantastic Beasts and Where to Find Them	US$6.28 million	
48	27 November 2016	Fantastic Beasts and Where to Find Them	US$3.39 million	
49	4 December 2016	Sully	US$2.3 million	
50	11 December 2016	Sully	US$2 million	
51	18 December 2016	Rogue One: A Star Wars Story	US$3.29 million	
52	25 December 2016	Moana	US$1.7 million	
