= Francesca Chillemi =

Italian actress and presenter

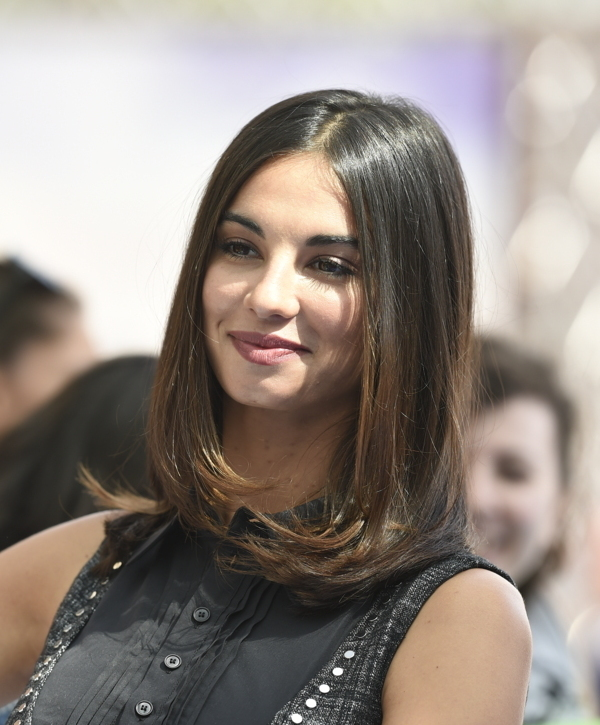
- Chillemi at the 2015 Giffoni Film Festival
- Born: 25 July 1985 (age 40); Barcellona Pozzo di Gotto, Sicily, Italy
- Occupations: Actress, model
- Partner: Stefano Rosso
- Children: 1

Francesca Chillemi (Italian pronunciation: [franˈtʃeska kilˈlɛːmi]; born 25 July 1985) is an Italian actress, model, television personality and beauty pageant titleholder.

== Early life and career ==
At the age of 18, Chillemi won the Miss Italia 2003 beauty contest. She subsequently started a career as model, actress and television presenter.

She plays the role of Azzurra Leonardi in the RAI TV drama Che Dio ci aiuti.

== Personal life ==
In 2009, Chillemi was photographed in company of Mutassim Gaddafi son of the Libyan leader Muammar Gaddafi. She later clarified that it was only a friendship.

Chillemi is in a relationship with Stefano Rosso, shareholder of the OTB Group. They had a daughter together in 2016 and moved to New York the following year.

== Filmography ==
=== Television ===
Year	Title	Role(s)	Notes
2003	Miss Italia	Herself / Contestant	Annual beauty contest – Winner
2004	Un medico in famiglia	Costanza	Episodes: "Scherzi del destino"; "Il piede in due staffe"
2004–2005	I raccomandati	Herself / Co-host	Talent show (seasons 3–4)
2005	Aspettando Miss Italia	Herself / Host	Special
2007	Gente di mare	Verna Leonetti	Main role (season 2)
2007–2008	Carabinieri	Laura Flestero	Main role (seasons 6–7)
2008	Vita da paparazzo	Michela	Television film
2008	Inspector Montalbano	Teresa Sciacca	Episode: "La luna di carta"
2010	Squadra antimafia – Palermo oggi	Michela Turrisi	3 episodes
2010	Saint Philip Neri: I Prefer Heaven	Ippolita	Television film
2011	Notte prima degli esami '82	Claudia Baciocco	Television film
2011–present	Che Dio ci aiuti	Azzurra Leonardi	Main role
2012	La figlia del capitano	Kitty	Television film
2012	Sposami	Nora	Main role
2013	Miss Italia	Herself / Host	Annual beauty contest
2014	La bella e la bestia	Corinne	Television film
2016	L'ispettore Coliandro	Lucia Gallo	Episode: "Tassista notturno"
2016	Braccialetti rossi	Bobo's mother	Recurring role
2019	L'isola di Pietro	Monica Mirafiori	Main role (season 3)
2021	Leonardo	Margherita	2 episodes
2022	Viola come il mare	Viola Vitale	Lead role

=== Film ===
Year	Title	Role(s)	Notes
2009	Feisbum: The Movie	Veridiana	Segment: "Gaymers"
2009	Cado dalle nubi	Luisa	
2010	The Woman of My Dreams	Herself	Cameo appearance
2017	Natale da chef	Laura Micheletti	
2021	With or Without You	Nicole Fantini	
