= Gigi Angelillo =

Italian actor (1939–2015)

- Born: Luigi Angelillo; 20 December 1939; Gioia del Colle, Italy
- Died: 21 July 2015 (aged 75); Rome, Italy
- Occupations: Actor; voice actor; theatre director
- Years active: 1966–2015
- Spouse: Ludovica Modugno

Luigi "Gigi" Angelillo (20 December 1939 – 21 July 2015) was an Italian actor, voice actor and theatre director.

== Biography ==
Angelillo began an acting career on stage and screen in the 1960s and during the 1980s. He appeared in more than 20 films from 1966 to 2012 and he became well known to the Italian public as a voice dubber. From 1987 to 1995, he was the official Italian voice of Scrooge McDuck and he has performed other voice acting work for Disney. He has dubbed Wallace Shawn and Ronald Lacey in a select number of their films.

In 1978, he founded the Società Teatrale 'l'Albero' with the actress and voice actress Ludovica Modugno.

=== Personal life ===
Angelillo was married to fellow actress and voice actress Ludovica Modugno until his death in 2015.

== Death ==
Angelillo died on 21 July 2015, aged 75, after suffering a long illness.

== Filmography ==
=== Cinema ===
- Tesoro mio (1979)
- Giovanni Falcone (1993)
- Sacred Heart (2005)
- Romanzo Criminale (2005)
- The Family Friend (2006)
- Cado dalle nubi (2009)
