= What a Beautiful Day (film) =

- Italian: Che bella giornata
- Directed by: Gennaro Nunziante
- Written by: Checco Zalone & Gennaro Nunziante
- Produced by: Pietro Valsecchi
- Starring: Checco Zalone; Luigi Luciano; Mehdi Brando Mahdloo; Nabiha Akkari; Rocco Papaleo
- Music by: Checco Zalone
- Distributed by: Medusa Film
- Release date: 5 January 2011 (Italy)
- Running time: 97 minutes
- Country: Italy
- Language: Italian
- Budget: €6,000,000 ($5,430,000)
- Box office: €43.4 million ($63.6 million)

What a Beautiful Day (Italian: Che bella giornata) is a 2011 Italian film directed by Gennaro Nunziante starring Checco Zalone, Luigi Luciano and Rocco Papaleo. The film is currently the ninth highest-grossing film in Italy.

== Plot ==
Checco, a man who works as a bouncer at a nightclub in Brianza, dreams of becoming a carabiniere like his uncle Giuseppe Capobianco, however, he is rejected by Colonel Gismondo Mazzini after his third interview in one year. By the recommendation of the Archbishop of Milan, Checco manages to become a security officer at Milan Cathedral. While working at the cathedral he meets Farah, an Arab woman pretending to be an architecture student in order to gain access to the Madonnina. Farah, with the help of her brother and two other accomplices, plans to place an explosive device at the feet of the Madonnina to avenge the killing of her family in an unspecified bombing. Checco takes Farah to a dilapidated trullo, which he inherited from his grandfather in Alberobello. Checco wants the trullo to be demolished, however, it would cost €10,000. As the two spend time together, Checco falls in love with Farah.

Farah becomes conflicted by her plan to destroy Milan Cathedral, and by the friendship and kindness shown to her from Checco and his family. Before returning to her country, Farah gives Checco a suitcase that is supposed to contain the bomb, telling him not to open it until he reaches the Madonnina. When Checco opens the suitcase he discovers a model of a house that conceals the activation mechanism of the bomb. The bomb, which Farah had evidently placed in Checco's trullo, explodes, demolishing it as Checco desired.

Throughout the film, Checco continuously mentions (albeit some do also appear) relatives of his sharing the last name "Capobianco", acting as a running gag.

== Cast ==
- Checco Zalone: Checco
- Rocco Papaleo: his father Nicola
- Tullio Solenghi: Cardinal Rosselli
- Mehdi Brando Mahdloo: Sufien
- Nabiha Akkari: Farah
- Ivano Marescotti: Colonel Gismondo Mazzini
- Luigi Luciano: Giovanni
- Anna Rita Del Piano: Anna Capobianco, Checco's mother

== Reception ==
The film was met with high commercial success. In its opening weekend, the comedy surpassed Avatar for the most sales in the first 3 days of release, reaching $9.4 million. In just its second week, it reached $42.2 million in box-office revenue, topping Life Is Beautiful to become the highest-grossing Italian film in Italy. Life Is Beautiful retained the worldwide record for an Italian film with $70 million worldwide.

The film was surpassed as the highest-grossing Italian film in Italy by Sole a catinelle in 2013, also starring Zalone and directed by Nunziante and is now third behind the leader Quo Vado?, again starring Zalone and directed by Nunziante. It is currently the fifth highest-grossing film in Italy.

The film did not receive wide distribution outside of Italy, with only limited festival releases in France and the Philippines and only a wide release in the Italian-speaking Swiss canton of Ticino.

== See also ==
- List of Italian films of 2011
