= Buen Camino =

2025 Italian comedy film

- Directed by: Gennaro Nunziante
- Screenplay by: Checco Zalone; Gennaro Nunziante
- Story by: Checco Zalone; Gennaro Nunziante
- Starring: Checco Zalone
- Music by: Checco Zalone
- Production company: Indiana Production
- Distributed by: Medusa Film
- Release date: 25 December 2025
- Country: Italy
- Language: Italian
- Budget: €28 million
- Box office: €76,503,592

Buen Camino is a 2025 Italian comedy film directed by Gennaro Nunziante starring Checco Zalone. Released by Medusa Film on 25 December 2025, it proved to be a smash hit in the Italian box office. The film is the highest-grossing film in Italy.

== Plot ==
Checco is a wealthy, vain, and superficial heir, engaged to the Mexican model Martina. He owes his wealth to his father's 60 years of work; his father is currently ill. A few days before his 50th birthday, his daughter Cristal disappears. After being informed by his ex-wife Linda (a former model reduced to an actress without roles) and her partner, the Palestinian writer and director Tarek, who lives an alternative lifestyle, Checco gets in touch with Corina, Cristal's best friend. He takes her to a luxury restaurant while she is on a diet and tempts her (he receives lavish dishes, she light ones). In the end Corina gives in, and Checco discovers that the girl has left to take part in the Camino de Santiago, using a fake document because she is underage. Checco reaches her, but Cristal wants nothing to do with him. Undeterred, Checco keeps following her, but during the journey his Ferrari is destroyed by bulls during the San Fermín festival in Pamplona, and his daughter rips off his toupee, turning him into the idiot of the day. Checco would like to go back home, but at the insistence of Alma, the leader of the group of pilgrims, he decides to continue the journey in order to try to rebuild his relationship with his daughter, beginning to give up various comforts.

During the journey, Checco, helped by Alma, tries to reconnect with his daughter, without success. Later, however, after Cristal is injured and forced to spend a few days in a wheelchair, things change: Checco stays by her side, encourages her to continue the journey, pushes her wheelchair, and father and daughter begin to grow closer again. Along the way, Checco discovers that Martina lied to him about her age and cheated on him several times, while Cristal realizes that her father goes to the bathroom too often and, together with Alma, takes him to the hospital, where Checco undergoes timely surgery for prostate cancer.

After a brief hospital stay, Checco thinks about returning home for the lavish celebration of his fiftieth birthday, thus disappointing his daughter, but at Alma's urging—by now he has fallen in love with her—he instead decides to continue the journey with Cristal, and the group of pilgrims reaches its destination. Once the journey is over, Checco decides to declare his feelings to Alma, only to discover that she is a nun. In the end, Linda and Tarek arrive in Spain to retrieve Cristal, but the girl leaves to join Checco. After discovering evidence of his son's over-the-top birthday party preparations, Checco's father has recovered, taken back control of the company, and insults Checco over the phone. Checco, however, has gained a new awareness and has decided to keep walking to understand himself better, followed closely by his daughter.

Before the end credits roll, the music video "Prostata Enflamada" is shown, referring to the episode involving Checco's prostate.

== Cast ==
- Checco Zalone as Checco Zalone
- Letizia Arnò as Cristal
- Beatriz Arjona as Alma
- Martina Colombari as Linda

== Production ==
The film was produced by Indiana Production.

== Release ==
Buen Camino was released in Italy on 25 December 2025 by Medusa Distribuzione.

After 13 days in Italian theatres, the film had grossed €59 million, good for becoming the third-largest grossing movie of all time at the domestic box office. On 18 January 2026, it became the highest-grossing film in Italy, with over €68 million in 24 days.

== Accolades ==
| Year | Award | Category | Nominee(s) | Result | Ref. |
|---|---|---|---|---|---|
| 2026 | 71st David di Donatello | Best Original Song | Luca Medici (Checco Zalone) & Antonio Iammarino for "La prostata enflamada" | Nominated | |

== Remakes ==
In October 2026, a Spanish remake directed by Susan Béjar and starring Jordi Sánchez and Venecia Franco was reported to have started filming. The announcement of the filming of a Mexican remake titled Un camino muy padre directed by Alfonso Pineda Ulloa and starring Miguel Rodarte and Loreto Peralta soon followed in November 2026.
