= Domenico Turitto =

Italian military officer (1847–1896)

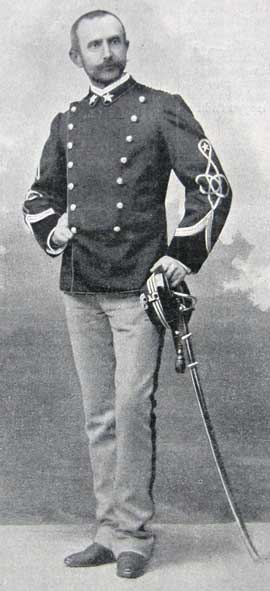
- Born: May 25, 1847; Cassano delle Murge, Terra di Bari, Two Sicilies
- Died: March 1, 1896 (aged 48); Adwa, Tigray, Ethiopia
- Education: Military Academy of Modena
- Military career
- Allegiance: Italy
- Branch: Royal Italian Army
- Service years: 1866 – 1896
- Rank: Major
- Unit: Royal Colonial Corps of Eritrea
- Conflicts: Mahdist War: Battle of Kassala; First Italo-Ethiopian War: Battle of Adwa †

Domenico Turitto was an Italian major who was part of the Royal Colonial Corps of Eritrea. He participated in the Mahdist War as he commanded the 1st Indigenous Infantry Battalion, occupying the city of Kassala and distinguishing himself at the Battle of Kassala. During the First Italo-Ethiopian War, Turitto commanded the vanguard of the Indigenous brigade under the command of Matteo Albertone before being killed in the battle. He was also a recipient of the Silver and Bronze Medals of Military Valor and a knight of the Order of Saints Maurice and Lazarus.

== Early military career ==
He was born in Cassano delle Murge on 25 May 1847 as the son of the lawyer Sante and Antonia Recchia. After completing his high school studies, he enlisted in the Royal Italian Army and entered the Military Academy of Modena and graduated with the rank of second lieutenant on June 17, 1866, in time to participate in the Third Italian War of Independence and sent to serve in the 60th Infantry Regiment "Calabria" which was stationed in Naples where he took part in the repression of the revolts that broke out in the same year.

He followed his regiment when it was transferred to Turin, being promoted to lieutenant in 1873 and captain in 1882, thus attending the Scuola di guerra dell'esercito. Transferred to the 37th Ravenna Infantry Regiment during 1885, he took part in the expedition led by Colonel Tancredi Saletta which led to the occupation of Massawa. Remaining in Cologne, on March 3, 1886, he received a Bronze Medal of Military Valor. Back in Italy, he went to serve again at the 37th Ravenna Infantry Regiment, later becoming aide de camp to General Carlo Genè.

== Occupation of Kassala ==
On 2 November 1887, he left again for East Africa following the expedition led by General Alessandro Asinari di San Marzano, destined to serve in the Autonomous Battalion of the Cacciatori d'Africa, transferring to the 1st Indigenous Infantry Regiment in 1888. In 1889, he assumed command of the IV Indigenous Battalion, participating in the occupation of Asmara led by General Antonio Baldissera in August, and returning to the Italian mainland on December 25, 1890, to serve as aide-de-camp in the 5th Infantry Regiment of the Aosta Infantry Brigade. He went back to Italian Eritrea in late 1892, assuming command of the I Indigenous Battalion, and was promoted to major during 1893. On July 17 of the following year he participated in the Battle of Kassala, being awarded the Knight's Cross of the Order of Saints Maurice and Lazarus for having distinguished himself in the fight against the Mahdist Sudanese.

General Oreste Baratieri remained in Kassala until 23 July with the bulk of the troops, at the same time giving the necessary provisions to make the occupation stable. He left on the 29th with General Giuseppe Arimondi with a battalion to help Major Turitto in the construction of the fort, and once the construction was completed, the latter settled there with 4 companies, the bands of Sabderat, of the Ad Omar and the artillery section with two mountain guns, for a combined garrison of 1,000 men.

== Battle of Adwa ==
He remained in the city's garrison until the outbreak of the First Italo-Ethiopian War. On the eve of the Battle of Adwa, his battalion was placed in the vanguard of the Indigenous Brigade under the command of General Matteo Albertone. The battalion was sent by the general to occupy a hill in the direction of Adwa. At the first light of dawn, the unit was attacked here by a column of the Imperial Ethiopian Army, thus starting the battle. Instead of retreating towards the bulk of the brigade, he preferred to accept the fight to give General Albertone time to take up a defensive position. Turitto engaged fighting for several hours against the gunmen of Menelik II and was killed in the course of the Ethiopian attack on March 1, 1896. Turitto was posthumously awarded the silver medal for Military Valor in memory as his body was never recovered. From then on, the 1st Eritrean Indigenous Battalion was held in his name until its dissolution in July 1941.

A street in his hometown bears his name, as does one in Bari. The town of Toritto was named after him.

== Awards ==
- Silver Medal of Military Valor

Commander of the vanguard battalion of the indigenous brigade alone withstood the first blow of the enemy masses, displaying exemplary energy and courage. He left his life in the field

- Bronze Medal of Military Valor
- Knight of the Order of Saints Maurice and Lazarus

For the skill and energy deployed in combat, and for the perseverance placed in trying to reach the fleeing enemy.

== See also ==
- Giuseppe Galliano
- Stefano Hidalgo
- Francesco Carchidio Malvolti
- Pietro Toselli
- Royal Colonial Corps of Eritrea
