= Cado dalle nubi =

- Directed by: Gennaro Nunziante
- Written by: Gennaro Nunziante; Checco Zalone
- Produced by: Pietro Valsecchi
- Starring: Checco Zalone; Giulia Michelini
- Music by: Checco Zalone
- Distributed by: Medusa Film
- Release date: 27 November 2009
- Running time: 95 minutes
- Country: Italy
- Language: Italian
- Box office: €14 million

Cado dalle nubi is a 2009 Italian comedy film directed by Gennaro Nunziante.

== Plot ==
Checco is a good guy from Polignano a Mare (Apulia), who loves music. He is ignorant and clumsy, and as a result is increasingly ridiculed. When his girlfriend Angela dumps him, Checco decides to go and stay with his cousin Alfredo in Milan, to seek his fortune in the music business. Alfredo lives with his boyfriend Manolo, but initially refuses to come out his family due to the latter's prejudice. After he reluctantly reveals his relationship to Checco, the musician falls in love with Marika, the daughter of an avid "leghista" (a sympathizer of the Lega Nord) from the separatist state "Padania", who hates Southern Italians.

== Cast ==
- Checco Zalone as Checco
- Giulia Michelini as Marika
- Dino Abbrescia as Alfredo
- Fabio Troiano as Manolo
- Ivano Marescotti as Marika's father
- Claudia Penoni as Marika's mother
- Peppino Mazzotta as Livio
- Stefano Chiodaroli as Giulio
- Gigi Angelillo as Checco's uncle
- Ludovica Modugno as Checco's aunt
- Anna Ferruzzo as Pina, Checco's mother
- Francesca Chillemi as Luisa
- Raul Cremona as Roberto
- Ivana Lotito as Angela
