= Heartless (1995 film) =

- Directed by: Umberto Marino
- Cinematography: Alessio Gelsini Torresi
- Music by: Francesco Verdinelli
- Production companies: Dania Film; Globe Films; RAI Due
- Distributed by: Warner Bros. Italia
- Release date: 1995
- Country: Italy
- Language: Italian

Heartless (Italian: Cuore cattivo) is a 1995 Italian crime-drama film directed by Umberto Marino.

== Cast ==
- Kim Rossi Stuart: Claudio Scalise
- Cecilia Genovesi: Esther Cipriani
- Massimo Ghini: Police Commissioner
- Massimo Wertmüller: Massimo Salvadori
- Ludovica Modugno: Esther's mother
- Massimo Popolizio: Minister
- Federico Scribani: Judge Isernia
- Clarita Gatto: Miriam
- Valerio Mastandrea: Inzerillo
- Barbara Livi: Sonia
- Stefania Rocca
