= Cassano delle Murge =

- Comune
- Comune di Cassano delle Murge
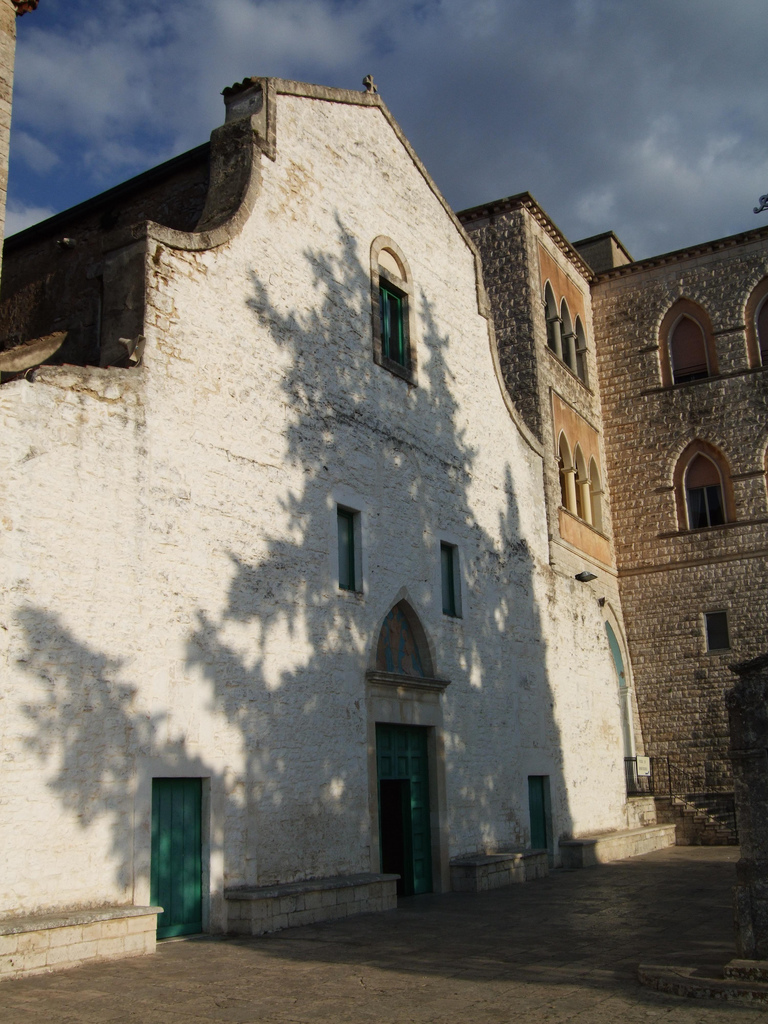
- Convent of Maria SS.ma degli Angeli

- Coat of arms

- Location within Italy Location within Apulia
- Coordinates: 40°53′N 16°46′E
- Country: Italy
- Region: Apulia
- Metropolitan city: Bari (BA)

Government
  - Mayor: Mariapia Di Medio

Area
  - Total: 89 km^{2} (34 sq mi)
- Elevation: 341 m (1,119 ft)

Population (31 December 2008)
  - Total: 13,260
  - Density: 150/km^{2} (390/sq mi)
- Demonym: Cassanesi
- Time zone: UTC+1 (CET)
  - Summer (DST): UTC+2 (CEST)
- Postal code: 70020
- Dialing code: 080
- Patron saint: Maria SS. degli Angeli
- Saint day: 2 August
- Website: Official website

Cassano delle Murge (Barese: Casséne) is a town and comune in the Metropolitan City of Bari, Apulia, southern Italy.

== Origins of the name ==
It probably derives from the Latin name Cassius with the addition of the suffix -anus.

According to others, the name refers to the ancient worship of Janus to whom a small temple was dedicated, that is, Jani's house. From this derives the toponym of the town "Casa Jani"

Actually, this derivation, proposed by the historian Nicola Alessandrelli, is rather doubtful, as "house" in Latin corresponds to domus.

An alternative hypothesis is that the name derives from the Cassia gens.

In the high imperial age, the wholeof Puglia was the object of centuriation by the Romans, so it could be Cassianum, that is, property of the Cassia family.

From archaeological excavations carried out, it seems that the cardo maximus (Via Sanges-Via Cavour axis) and the Decumanus Maximus (Via Gentile-Via Magg. Turitto axis) intersected in the current Piazzetta delle Quattro Colonne.

Moreover, Cassano stands on a link road between the Traiana way and the Appian Way, and it seems that the town was a rest station and a Camino dei cavalli.

Recently, a Romanic mosaic was discovered under the pavement of Miani Palace, which would prove the existence of a Roman villa, in compliance with the custom of building the most important buildings near the most important crossroads.

In Italy, there are seven towns called Cassano, so in 1862 "delle Murge" was added to distinguish it from the others.

The specification refers to the well-known Apulian plateau.

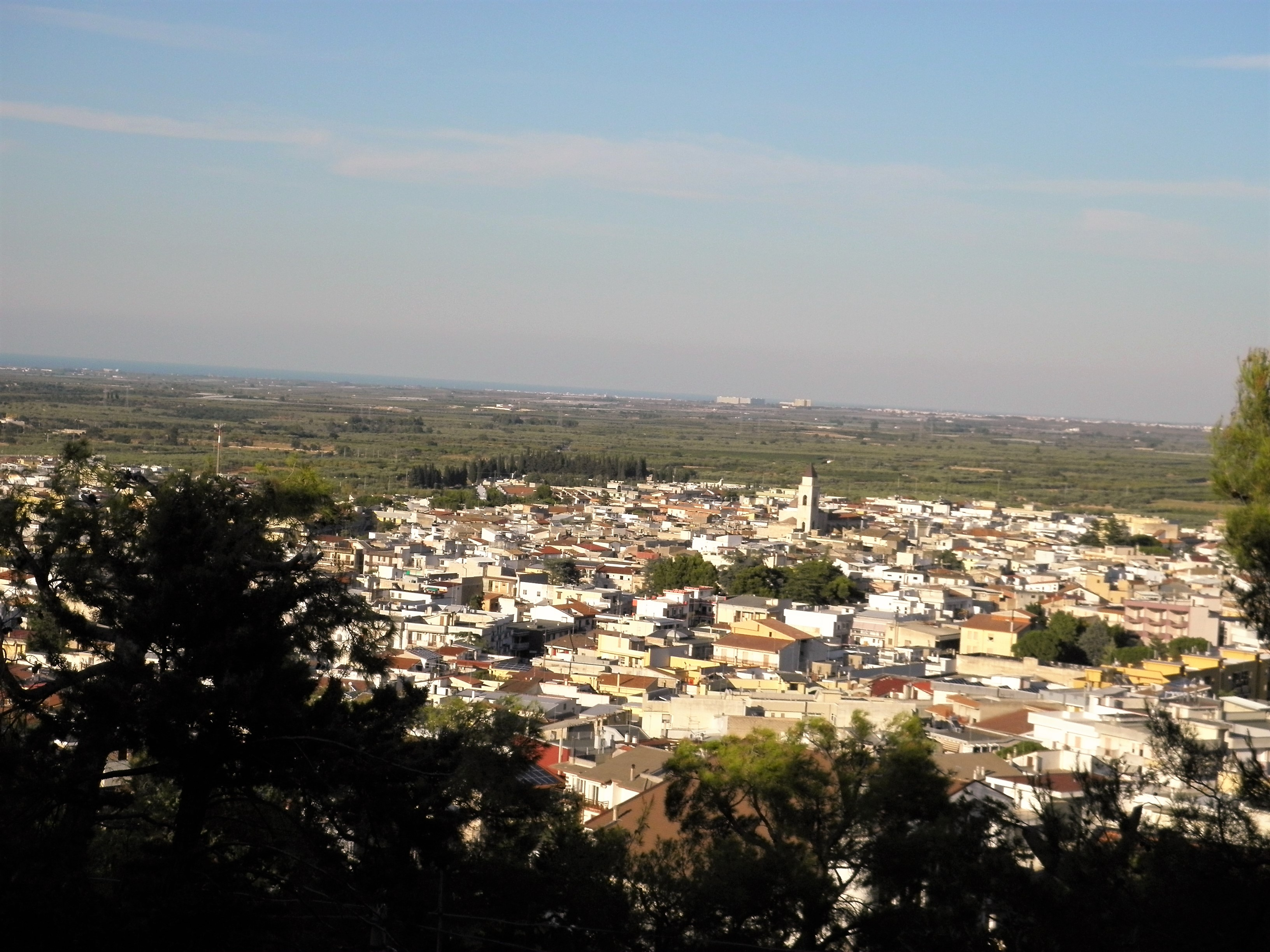
Cassano delle Murge

== History ==
=== Prehistoric Age ===
Hundreds of stone artefacts, paintings, and various objects found in the caves around the town tell us about prehistoric settlements.

The recent discovery of a menhir, dating back to 2500–2000 BC, confirms the antiquity of the human presence in these districts.

=== Roman Age ===
The origins of Cassano seem to date back to the Roman Age, as confirmed by many archaeological findings, such as the recent discovery of a precious 5th-century mosaic floor.

Also in late antiquity, in a point of the territory called "Lake of Battaglia" a clash relating to the Greek-Gothic War took place between the army of the Byzantine Empire and the troops of the Gothic Totila, during which it would have distinguished itself, for courage, a Cassanese woman dressed as a warrior, distinguished herself, for courage and heroism.

To worship her memory, her companions erected a monument to her with a pile of stones, still known today as "Specchia di femina morta".

Due to the typical karstic conformation of the area, there are a lot of grottos. The biggest is located about 3 km from the urban built-up area, the grotto called "di Cristo", was discovered in the 17th century. Two kilometres to the east, we find the grave of "Pasciullo", 180 meters deep and still to be explored. Three kilometres to the south-east, a source called "Pozzo di Conetto" gushes.

Historical investigations have ascertained the existence of a temple dedicated to Janus in the place where the church of SS. Crucifix is.

== Physical geography ==
=== Weather ===
The weather of Cassano delle Murge is a cool Mediterranean one, with not very cold winters and hot and dry summers. Rainfall is around 700 mm / year, therefore generally abundant in winter, autumn and spring and rare in summer, from July to September, although there are also thunderstorms in the afternoon. Snow falls almost exclusively in January and February, during the cold air waves from the Balkans or from Northern Europe. In winter, the prevailing wind is the sirocco or libeccio.

== Monuments and Places of interest ==
=== Religious architectures ===
- Convento di Maria Santissima degli Angeli
- Chiesa di Santa Maria Assunta (chiesa matrice – sede parrocchiale)
- Chiesa della Madonna delle Grazie (sede parrocchiale)
- Chiesa del Santissimo Crocifisso
- Chiesa di San Giuseppe
- Chiesa di San Nicola
- Chiesa di San Rocco
- Cappella dell'Immacolata
- Cappella della Madonna di Costantinopoli

=== Civil architectures ===
- Miani Palace

== Society ==
=== Demographic evolution ===
Inhabitants registered by Istituto Nazionale di Statistica.

=== Ethnicities and foreign minorities ===
The foreigners living in Cassano delle Murge are 553. In 2013, the most numerous groups were:

- Albania, 402
- Romania, 122

== Culture ==
=== Cinema ===
Cassano delle Murge has been transformed into a film set on several occasions.

Between 1930 and 1931, the Milanese director Mauri made one of the last silent movies of the Italian cinema, but one of the first silent movies made in Apulia. Idillio infranto – Film folkloristico pugliese, this title had the female Mantovani protagonist Mantovani and a cast of amateur actors, with Michele Silecchia and Filippo Ilbello. Shootings were carried out by the photographer Perugini, and some scenes were filmed in the countryside of the Murgia, near Cassano delle Murge. The movie, in black and white, lasts 53 minutes.

Another movie is Three brothers (1981), a film by Francesco Rosi with Michele Placido, Philippe Noiret, Vittorio Mezzogiorno, Charles Vanel.

In 2004 the Apulian director Sergio Rubini filmed Love Returns, with Margherita Buy and Mariangela Melato.

=== Art ===
In 2016, the Apulia Land art Festival was held by Massimo Nardi. Over 20 countries in the world took part, almost 100 artists were asked to take part, and 11 of them were invited to the final competition. Embassies of every culture, the artists of the recent edition of ALAF were characterised by extremely different, heterogeneous and, at the same time, complementary curricula. Harvard, Cambridge, University College of London, IED, Academy of Bulgaria and many others are the institutions represented, making an urbi et orbi of art in the silvanico Bosco di Mesola, which, as expected by the festival's statements, becomes, for a week, one of the protagonists of the Italian contemporary art scenes.

== Economy ==
=== Handicraft ===
Among the most traditional and renowned activities there are handicrafts, which are distinguished by the production of wicker and Juncus, used for the creation of furniture.

== List of mayors ==
Below is a table relating to the successive administrations in this town.

Period		Office holder	Party	Title	Notes
12 May 1986	14 July 1990	Armando Giorgio	Democrazia Cristiana	Sindaco	
14 July 1990	25 September 1991	Paolo Nuzzaco	Democrazia Cristiana	Sindaco	
26 October 1991	24 April 1995	Giuseppe Leporale	Partito Repubblicano Italiano	Sindaco	
24 April 1995	14 June 1999	Giuseppe Antonio Leporale	Centro-sinistra	Sindaco	
14 June 1999	14 June 2004	Giuseppe Gentile	Centro-sinistra	Sindaco	
14 June 2004	8 June 2009	Giuseppe Gentile	Lista civica	Sindaco	
9 June 2009	26 May 2014	Maria Pia Di Medio	Lista civica	Sindaco	
26 May 2014	7 December 2016	Vito Domenico Lionetti	Lista civica Rinascita verso nuovi orizzonti	Sindaco	
9 December 2016	12 June 2017	Francesco Antonio Cappetta	-	Commissario prefettizio	
12 June 2017	in carica	Maria Pia Di Medio	Lista civica X te	Sindaco	

== Sport ==
- ASD Atletico Cassano – Futsal amateur football club, member of the serie A2 championship.
- ASD Volley Cassano – Amateur volleyball club member of the youth sector and of the serie D championship.
- ASD Cassano skating – Amateur roller skating society that annually participates in regional and national championships.

== Notable people ==
- Anna Rita Del Piano, Italian actress and theatre director
- Antonio Quatraro, European Commission official.
- Domenico Turitto, Italian officer during the First Italo-Ethiopian War
