= Antonio Quatraro =

Italian EU official (1934–1993)

Antonio Quatraro (1934 – March 30, 1993) was an Italian European Commission official who fell to his death from an EU office building on the Rue de la Loi/Wetstraat, Brussels. At the time of his death, he was under investigation for bribery. The cause of death (suicide or homicide) has not been determined. The incident marked the beginning of a long series of fraud cases within the EU system.

== Personal life ==
Antonio Quatraro was born in 1934 in Cassano delle Murge, Italy. He studied economics and commerce at the University of Bari, followed by a post-graduate degree in international relations from the London School of Economics. In addition, he held degrees in political and diplomatic science from the Université libre de Bruxelles and in commercial and financial studies from the Institut Supérieur de Commerce Saint Louis.

At the time of his death, he was 59 years old.

== Career ==
As an employee of the EU agricultural directorate, he was head of the financial administration of the European Agricultural Guidance and Guarantee Fund.

In 1981 he was appointed as head of the Tobacco Division, which put him in charge of tobacco subsidies under the Common Agricultural Policy.

A 1991 administrative enquiry report provided ground for suspected malpractice, and disciplinary proceedings were initiated. The case was subjected to an internal investigation by the European Commission (UCLAF). The investigation was abandoned following his death in 1993.

A news article described him as "the mastermind in a massive tobacco payments racket".

The European Commission prepared a report on the case, authored by Hans-Helmut Wachter. Attempts by MEPs to obtain a copy of the report have been denied.
