= Le ali della vita =

- Genre: Drama
- Created by: Stefano Reali
- Starring: Sabrina Ferilli; Virna Lisi; Giovanna Di Rauso; Rita Del Piano; Marisa Merlini
- Country of origin: Italy
- Original languages: Italian; German
- No. of seasons: 2
- No. of episodes: 4

Production
- Running time: 380 min.

Original release
- Release: March 21, 2000 – November 28, 2001

Le ali della vita (The Wings of Life) is an Italian television miniseries directed by Stefano Reali.

== Premise ==
Rosanna Ranzi is a headstrong choir teacher who starts a job at the Pio Istituto Sorelle Francescane Santa Chiara, a girls' boarding school in Campo Tures, South Tyrol. The school is run by Sister Alberta, a cold, manipulative woman. Over time, Rosanna gets to know the other nuns of the school and becomes friends with Sister Celestina and Sister Adele.

== Cast ==
Characters season 1

- Sabrina Ferilli: Rosanna Ranzi
- Virna Lisi: Sister Alberta
- Ute Maria Lerner: Sister Federica
- Tobias Hoesl: Dr. Vithold Heisler
- Giovanna Di Rauso: Stefania
- Rita Del Piano: Sister Celestina
- Azzurra Antonacci: Alice
- Myriam Catania: Nicoletta Armandi
- Carolina Felline: Elena
- Emanuela Aurizi: Monica
- Giulia Bagella: Nadia
- Marisa Merlini: Sister Adele
- Pino Micol: prefect Armandi
- Roberto Chevalier: Giuseppe
- Carlo Reali: bishop Joseph Gargitter
- Andrea Tidona: Pietro
- Antonio Carli: Bolzano student
- Paolo Bonanni: Mario
- Mirta Pepe: Luisa
- Carla Ortenzi: Maria
- Paola Tiziana Cruciani: Giorgia

Characters season 2

- Sabrina Ferilli: Rosanna Ranzi
- Virna Lisi: Sister Alberta
- Giovanna Di Rauso: Stefania
- Rita Del Piano: Sister Celestina
- Pier Luigi Coppola: Fabrizio / Emanuele Villoresi
- Renato De Carmine: Gherardo Villoresi
- Lia Tanzi: Olga Villoresi
- Gino Lavagetto: prof Maurizio Lorenzi
- Ivan Bacchi: lawyer Nicola La Torre
- Emilio Bonucci: prof Giusti
- Glauco Onorato: judge Giulio Cortesi
- Marisa Merlini: Sister Adele
- Roberto Stocchi: priest
- Paolo Buglioni: Sarti
- Danny Baldin: Andrea
- Domenico Fortunato: Salvatore De Maria
- Pia Velsi: Sister Rosalia
- Luigi Di Majo: public minister
- Francesco Benigno: Piero

== See also ==
- List of Italian television series
