= Che Dio ci aiuti =

- Genre: Comedy-drama
- Created by: Carlotta Ercolino
- Starring: Elena Sofia Ricci; Valeria Fabrizi; Francesca Chillemi; Miriam Dalmazio; Serena Rossi; Massimo Poggio; Laura Piacentile; Lino Guanciale; Cesare Christian Favonio; Laura Glavan; Rosa Rossi; Sofia Panizzi; Neva Leoni; Cristiano Caccamo; Diana Del Bufalo; Gianmarco Saurino; Arianna Montefiori; Bianca Di Veroli; Christian Monaldi; Laura Gagliardi; Simonetta Colombu; Margherita Manfredi; Matilde Manfredi; Erasmo Genzini; Pierpaolo Spollon; Isabella Mottinelli; Olimpia Noviello; Fiorenza Pieri; Federica Pagliaroli; Emma Valenti; Ileana D'Ambra; Filippo De Carli; Valerio Di Domenicantonio
- Composer: Andrea Guerra
- Country of origin: Italy
- Original language: Italian
- No. of seasons: 7
- No. of episodes: 132

Production
- Production locations: Modena (1−2); Fabriano (3−5); Assisi (6-in corso)
- Running time: 50-55 minutes (episode)
- Production company: Lux Vide for Rai Fiction

Original release
- Network: Rai 1
- Release: December 15, 2011 – present

Che Dio ci aiuti (May God Help Us) is an Italian TV series that has been broadcast in Italy since December 15, 2011.

== Plot ==
Sister Angela (Elena Sofia Ricci) is an ex imprisoned nun who completely changed her life, living at a convent named Convento degli Angeli (Angel's Convent), based in Modena. When the convent encounters economic difficulties and risks closure, she decides to convert it into student accommodations including a cafè, "L'Angolo Divino", even if her Mother Superior (Sister Costanza) initially didn't agree. This brings new energy to the convent, which becomes a place where every kind of people can gather.

Sister Angela gets closer especially to Giulia, Azzurra and Margherita in the first season; each of them has a different personality and completely different problems. She speaks to them and learns about their daily lives, often helping to solve their problems.

Important presence of the convent is sister Costanza, wise and grouch mother superior who often scolds sister Angela for not following the rules, but deep down is fond of her.

Season 1 mostly focuses on crime solving, even thanks to the presence of the policeman Marco Ferraro, while later seasons focused more on cases of various kind, with the help of the lawyers Guido Corsi first and Nicodemo "Nico" Santopaolo after. Though they often disapprove of Sister Angela's behavior, the Mother Superior and the lawyers Guido and Nico always end up helping her with her adventures, trying to solve the cases.

== Cast and characters ==
=== Main ===
- Elena Sofia Ricci as Sister Angela/Lorenza Rapetti (seasons 1–6; recurring season 7; special guest season 8), she was the protagonist from season 1 to 6. Her original name was Lorenza Rapetti, but after getting out of jail, she becomes a nun and changes her name. She was prisoned for armed robbery and complicity in murder, and through this tragic experience, which affected her a lot, she learned to give value to her life, to little things, emotions and emotional bonding, and through her strong faith she learned that rebirth, learning from our mistakes, maturing and changing by giving second chances is always possible, when you really believe it. She's a real meddler, conditioning person, who always acts for good. She's always willing to help, kind, funny and ready to give herself to people who need her, and thanks to her empathy and intuition she can comprehend pain, doubts and fears of those who are around her, who ask for her help. Her willpower and immense generosity make her become a landmark for those she meets through her path, especially those living in the convent. At the end of season 5, she gets into a spiritual crisis, following Guido's and Davide's deaths, but thanks to Azzurra she finds God again and comes back to loving life again. In season 6, thanks to sister Costanza and Azzurra, she finds out she has a brother named Erasmo, to whom she gets affected. In season 7, she's forced to leave the convent, going to work in prison, but even though she wanted to stay close to Azzurra as becomes a novice, she understands that her presence would prevent the girl from becoming independent. She comes back when Azzurra becomes a nun.
- Valeria Fabrizi as Sister Costanza/Valeria Valenti (seasons 1–6; recurring season 7; special guest season 8). She's the Mother Superior of the convent, she doesn't accept improper behaviors from sister Angela, and almost feels like she's bothered by her. But she actually has a heart of gold, behind the cold mask, who really loves sister Angela and all the girls living in the convent. She's a really devoted woman. Azzurra loves her a lot, as she becomes a landmark in Azzurra's life just as sister Angela.
- Francesca Chillemi as Azzurra Leonardi (season 1-present). She seems like the classic fashion victim, snob, raging, egoist superficial girl at first, but with time she starts showing an honest, good ana generous side with the ability of empathize with other people. She had many love interests, like Marco, Giannandrea and Dario, but her real true love was Guido Corsi, which she falls in love with, reciprocated, despite the little arguments they have through the course of the seasons. They start a relationship, and eventually marry. Then, Azzurra knows Rosa, finding out she's her younger half-sister, because they share the same dad. Later, we find out she had a daughter when she was younger, named Emma from her ex-boyfriend Ludovico Nobili, but she gave the baby for adoption, and that was so traumatic for her that she removes the memory of her daughter, who she finds again after many years. Azzurra and Guido adopt Davide, but once they start living together in London, Guido and Davide die in a car accident, leaving a huge grief in her and sister Angela's heart. She decides to go back living in the convent, and slowly finds out a bigger love, love for God, appeasing the chasm left in her heart so much that she decides to become a novice in order to become a nun. She starts brotherly relationship with many people who live in the convent throughout the seasons, but the most important bond she creates is the one with sister Costanza and especially the one with sister Angela, who always believes in her and never stopped helping her, bringing Azzurra to consider her more of a landmark in her life, a sort of a mother, rather than a simple friend. She takes care of Penny, an orphan girl with which she bonds in a special way: the girl is affected by heart disease, and it's only possible to save her through a heart transplant, which was given to her from little Davide. From season 7, she becomes the protagonist, and sister Teresa follows her path through her novitiate, and at the end she takes her perpetual vows, becoming officially a nun. She later moves to Rome in a group home named "La casa del Sorriso", as a living operator, where she meets Lorenzo, the director, and his sons, Pietro and Giulia. With Lorenzo's help, she takes care of the girls living in the group home, trying to help them to build a life and a future and finding stability in their lives.
- Miriam Dalmazio as Margherita Morbidelli (seasons 1–3; guest season 4). She's a small-town girl, sweet, kind, light-hearted, sensitive and dreamer, really bonded to her family. She has a talent for cooking and loves to dance. She moves to the convent to study, as she is specializing in forensic medicine, even though both her parents believe she's studying pediatrics. She looks for the affection she never had from her mother in sister Angela. She loves everything about crimes, while newborns and children disturb her. She has a long-distance relationship with Carlo, which she eventually dumps, even though she's sad. She won't be admitted to her specializing exam so she has to deal with hospitalized patients, who she starts to curate as a doctor. Right in the hospital, she meets a fascinating doctor who steals her heart, the department head Francesco Limbiati, who she later finds out is already married. She later meets an athlete affected by heart disease, Emilio Della Rosa. When Francesco leaves her wife Clelia to be with her, Margherita finds out she doesn't feel anything for him anymore, finding out she loves Emilio instead, and eventually marries him. In season 3, she comes back to the convent while pregnant, but on the birth day Emilio suffers from a seizure and is brought to the hospital, where, as soon as he sees his newborn daughter, dies. Margherita finds love again thanks to her colleague Carlo Romero, with which, after Azzurra and Guido' wedding, she starts a relationship and leaves, to go live in Brussels.
- Serena Rossi as Giulia Sabatini (season 1). She's a single mother who had to stop her informatics studies at university to take care of her daughter, Cecilia. She was born nine years earlier after Giulia's relationship with Marco, who doesn't know he's the father. Giulia is a very mature but proud woman, with a strong personality but good at heart and very kind. After contributing with the restructuring of sister Angela's cafè, she's convinced to stay there to work as bartender. Even though she's still in love with Marco, she keeps denying it to herself fearing to be dumped again with a post-it, as he did nine years before, after only two weeks of being together. In the meanwhile, she meets Ruggero, which is Marco's boss, and starts a relationship with him. He asks her to marry him and she says yes, but she changes her mind in the end, running to the train station where Marco's about to leave. He realizes he can't give up on her, and she reveals to him he's Cecilia's father. So he asks her to marry him and she says yes.
- Massimo Poggio as Marco Ferraro (season 1). He's a superior inspector, declassified because he made a mistake during a mission, even though he shows he's much cleverer and subtler than his superiors. Sister Angela tries everything to protect him, since she's bonded to him by a secret from her youth. That's why he offers hospitality to him inside the convent. Eventually, she reveals to him that she's involved in his father's assassination. Marco's mother, after his father's death, decided to leave his son, who spent his childhood in an institute. For this exact reason, he's apparently incapable of loving other people, and that's the reason he left every girlfriend he ever had after two weeks with a post-it note. It will be sister Angela's job to teach him to trust other people. After a brief relationship with Azzurra, only based on physical attraction, Marco understands he's still in love with Giulia, with whom he had a relationship previously, and after which Cecilia was born, even though he doesn't know he's the father. After Giulia's rejection (who she was about to marry and he had just declared to her), he decides to leave forever, but he'll never get to take to train because he can't give up on her: sister Angela makes him reunite with Giulia and makes her tell him the truth about Cecilia, so he asks her to marry him and she say yes.
- Laura Piacentile as Cecilia Sabatini (season 1). She's Marco and Giulia's daughter. She's 8 years old, she's very clever, loves to study instead of reading fairy tales. Without her mom knowing, she gets admitted to the conservatory, where she'll study piano. Despite the initial conflicts, she bonds a lot with Marco, who supports her in her dream of studying at the conservatory, and he gets to the point of selling one of the paintings he has at home to buy her a piano. She eventually finds out he's her dad.
- Lino Guanciale as Guido Corsi (seasons 2–3; recurring season 4). He's a former lawyer, now academic professor, known to his female students as "sexy prof". He's very erudite, a lover of reading and culture in general, and he's really clever. He's married to Manuela, but their relationship ends when he finds out she cheated on him with a man with whom she had a son, Davide. She entrusts sister Angela with the custody of Davide, and she helps Guido being a guardian.He gets into the convent as a tutor, as sister Angela hopes that getting closer to the boy will make up his mind. He gives a year to find the boy's father. Meanwhile, he starts getting closer to Azzurra, even if they're very different and always end up fighting. He's in a relationship with Beatrice, but he leaves her when he understands he's in love with Azzurra, starting a family with her and Davide. They'll live in Berlin for a year, but when they come back in Italy he dumps her after he saw her kissing another man during a party. After he came back to Fabriano, he starts a relationship with Rosa, but understands he never stopped loving Azzurra and ends up confessing to her. After they marry, at the start of season 4, Guido leaves to London together with Davide, leaving his wife at the convent because she has to finish her internship. He'll come back to help Azzurra reveal to Emma she's her mom, showing her he can love the girl as his own daughter, and they go back to London after Azzurra graduates, being a family of four. He eventually dies with Davide in a car accident after six months, leaving Azzurra, in season 5, filled with grief, so that she considers turning the convent into a luxury hotel and sell it to go away.
- Cesare Christian Favonio as Davide Corsi (seasons 2–3; recurring season 4). He's Guido's first wife's son, and sister Angela takes care of him while he's in the convent. He's a loving and sweet boy, and Azzurra becomes his babysitter, becoming a sort of mom to him, and they bond a lot. Guido decides to be a dad to him. He's into soccer and in season 2 learns to play drums.
- Laura Glavan as Nina Cristaldi (seasons 2–3). She's a graduating law student, with a cold-hearted, detached, stubborn personality, but sometimes shows some kindness, bonding with the other girls, especially Chiara. She starts a relationship with Sergio, a man who went to jail for some robbery, but they split up eventually. In season 3 she tries to become Guido's assistant, but Rosa takes her place and she becomes a teacher in the same school as sister Angela and gets close to Alice. She falls in love with Gregorio, but Alice likes him as well, in spite of him being her teacher, but he starts a relationship with Nina in the end, They leave to Africa in season 4.
- Rosa Rossi as Chiara Alfieri (season 2). She's the other graduating law student. She often fights with Nina, but they end up collaborating in cases. She gets pregnant of her boyfriend Riccardo, but she eventually has a spontaneous miscarriage. This will leave a sign in her, but she gets through it thanks to the people around her. She especially bonds with Nina, and at the end understands she wants to take her vows and become a nun. But her father doesn't agree and threatens to shut down the convent.
- Neva Leoni as Rosa Francini (season 3; recurring season 4). Mysterious and ambiguous as much as fascinating and erudite, she's ready to turn upside down the lives of those in the convent, at first taking place as Guido's assistant, and then fighting with Azzurra to eventually start a relationship with him. All to find her dad, which she deeply hates for abandoning her and her mom. She finds out she's the illegitimate daughter of notary Leondardi, Azzurra's father, but at first only sister Angela knows, fearing the rivalry of the two girls, and the hate of Rosa towards her father. At first she hates Azzurra as she's jealous of her relationship with Guido and Davide, but with time they get closer and accept the love between Guido and Azzurra. Thanks to sister Angela, she gives up on revenge upon her father and reconciles with her sister. After Guido and Azzurra's wedding, she moves to Milan, where she follows her lawyer career. In season 8, we find out she gets temporary custody of a girl, Caterina, and she will start documents in order to adopt her.
- Cristiano Caccamo as Gabriele Mattei (seasons 4–5)
- Diana Del Bufalo as Monica Giulietti (season 4, 6). She used to go to high school with Nico, with whom she was in love. She's a brilliant doctor, at first a control freak and obsessed with lists and schemes. After an important relationship with Luca, she ends up marrying him during a cruise, and then he disappears, leaving her with his son, Edo. She's still in love with Nico, reciprocated, but she's afraid of admitting it, because he used to make fun of her for her body. She gets interested in Gabriele, her hospital colleague, who's actually in love with Valentina, and later she starts a relationship with Martino, another colleague of hers, who she will find out as another affair. In the end, Monica and Nico will finally admit their mutual feelings for each other, but end up splitting up because they want different things, as he's not ready to commit. When he's finally ready, Luca comes back and their plans change, as Monica decides to get back with him so as to not lose Edo. In season 6, she comes back to Assisi, after being dumped by Luca, who took away Edo and emptied her bank account, and she gets closer to Nico again, becoming his friend, with a much stronger and stable bond between them. She finds out she can't have children. She starts getting closer to Penny, so Azzurra tries to convince her to take custody of the girl, since she need and adoptive family. She starts a relationship with psychiatrist Emiliano, precise and control freak as she was in the past, who makes her like that again, but Nico makes her understands she can't go back to her past self and that it's ok she's a new person now. She then realizes she's still in love with him, but doesn't want to confess, because he's in a relationship with Ginevra now. So she leaves to Barcelona because she wants a child, but she doesn't feel like adopting Penny because she's afraid of losing her as she did with Edo. She eventually changes her mind, and when Nico understands he loves her too, they finally get together and have a happy ending, with Penny and Mattia.
- Gianmarco Saurino as Nicodemo "Nico" Santopaolo (seasons 4–6). He's Guido best friend, and he's best man at his wedding, before taking his place in the convent. He's a ladies' man and old Monica's classmate in high school, where he used to make fun of her body. He eventually apologizes. He is a good lawyer, and his contribution is often vital to solving cases in which sister Angela gets involved. He understands he's in love with Monica, but ends up having a relationship with a girl named Asia. Him and Monica eventually end up confessing their feelings for each other, but he decides to get serious, her ex-husband get back and she decides to leave with him and Edo. In season 5, he gets back being a ladies' man because he's suffering for losing the one he believed being the woman of his life, and he finds out he has a son, Mattia, born from his relationship with Asia. He doesn't want to take care of the boy though, until sister Angela lies to Nico, saying Asia will come back after six months getting back the kid, but she will not. Sister Angela hopes he'll get closer to the boy and decide to keep him. After meeting Maria, sister Costanza niece, they start having 'adventures' without ever getting together, but eventually end up having a relationship. He finds out he's attracted to Ginevra and kisses her, dumping Maria right after. After Ginevra realizes she reciprocates his feelings, they get together. In season 6, they're about to get married, but understand they're not ready and need some time alone before doing it, especially her. When Monica comes back, they start a much more mature and stable relationship as friends, getting closer than ever, getting him to realize she's still the woman of his life. So, even though he keeps getting ups and downs with Ginevra, even getting to their wedding, he understands he can't marry her, because he's not really in love. So he eventually confesses to Monica, and they get their happy ending, starting a family with Penny and Mattia.
- Arianna Montefiori as Valentina Valpreda (seasons 4–5)
- Bianca Di Veroli as Emma Leonardi (season 4; guest season 5)
- Christian Monaldi as Edoardo (season 4; guest season 6)
- Laura Gagliardi as Maria Adriani (season 5)
- Simonetta Colombu as Ginevra Alberti (seasons 5–6)
- Margherita Manfredi as Daniela (season 5)
- Matilde Manfredi as Silvia (season 5)
- Erasmo Genzini as Erasmo Ferri (season 6)
- Pierpaolo Spollon as Emiliano Stiffi (seasons 6-present)
- Isabella Mottinelli as Carolina / Sara Belli (season 6; guest season 7)
- Olimpia Noviello as Penelope "Penny" Martino (season 6)
- Fiorenza Pieri as Sister Teresa (season 7-present)
- Federica Pagliaroli as Sara Luparini (season 7-present)
- Emma Valenti as Ludovica Perini (season 7-present)
- Ileana D'Ambra as Caterina Saltalamacchia (season 7-present)
- Filippo De Carli as Ettore Fazio (season 7-present)
- Valerio di Domenicantonio as Elia Brighi (season 7-present)

=== Recurring ===
- Jampiero Giudica as Oscar Mario (season 1)
- Christian Ginepro as Italo Nuzzi (season 1)
- Enrico Mutti as Ruggero (season 1)
- Marco Messeri as Father Bernardo (season 1)
- Riccardo Carbonelli as Natalio Leonardi (season 1)
- Luca Berreca as Dr. Carlo (season 1)
- Giorgio Capitani as Ettore Salvemini (season 1)
- Luca Capuano as Francesco Limbiati (season 2)
- Jgor Barbazza as Giannandrea (season 2)
- Alessandro Borghi as Riccardo Manzi (season 2)
- Massimo Wertmüller as Giorgio Alfieri (season 2)
- Ludovico Fremont as Emilio (season 2–3)
- Edelfa Chiara Masciotta as Beatrice (season 2)
- Alan Goetz as Sergio (season 2; guest 3)
- Michele De Virgilio as Marcello Corsi (season 2–3)
- Ivano Marescotti as Achille (season 3)
- Sofia Panizzi as Alice Danieli (season 3)
- Tommaso Rememghi as Dario (season 3)
- Davide Silvestri as Gregorio Matteucci (season 3)
- Riccardo Alemanni as Mattia (season 3)
- Linda Gennari as Patrizia (season 3)
- Andrés Gil as Carlo Romero (season 3; guest 4)
- Irene Ferri as Elisa Rapetti (season 3, 6)
- Bernardo Casertano as Riccardo (season 4)
- Giampiero De Concilio as Andrea (season 4)
- Maria Chiara Giannetta as Asia (season 4–5)
- Davide Iacopini as Martino (season 4)
- Stefania Blandeburgo as Sister Beata (season 4–5)
- Raniero Monaco di Lapio as Ludovico "Athos" Nobili (season 5)
- Ilaria Bernabei as Eugenia Venneri (season 5)
- Sergio Romano as Pietro Santoro (season 5)
- Ilaria Spada as Teodora (season 5)
- Simone Riccioni as Alessio Belli (season 5)
- Piera degli Esposti as Sister Piera (season 5)
- Damiano Cuccuru as Mattia Santopaolo (season 5–6)
- Luigi Diberti as Primo Rapetti (season 6)
- Raffaele Esposito as Fabio Martino (season 6)
- Elena D'Amario as Luisa Monachini (season 7)
- Roberto Mantovani as Bishop (season 7)
- Teresa Romagnoli as Corinna (season 7)
- Alessandro Bruni Ocaña as Giuseppe (season 7)
- Enrico Oetiker as Marco (season 7)

== Production ==
The TV series was advertized through a brief crossover with another religious TV series, Don Matteo: after the episode that aired on December 8, 2011, on Rai 1, a short video was transmitted where Elena Sofia Ricci and Valeria Fabrizi, interpreting sister Angela and sister Costanza, meet the priest-detective interpreted by Terence Hill, which suggests them to call their cafè in Modena "L'Angolo Divino", and then turns to the public saying Che Dio ci aiuti (May God help us). All of this because both TV series have the same production companies: Lux Vide and Rai Fiction.

The series is directed by Francesco Vicario (also known for I Cesaroni, another long-term Italian TV series). The music is authored by Andrea Guerra. The idea for this TV series is from Carlotta Ercolino, which signed the story together with Elena Bucaccio, Mauro Gaiani and Andrea Valagussa.

The series debut had great success through the public, so much that in April 2012 the filming of the second season started. At the same time, the series registered a big change of course, because leaves the crime features to embrace comedy and romantic genres.

At the end of 2013 a third season was confirmed, and the filming started on April 7 in Fabriano. The production of a fourth season was made official on June 28, 2016, during the presentation of Rai programs schedule for the TV 2016–2017 season.

Filming of fifth season started in April 2018, and it was aired from January 10 to March 21, 2019. In January 2020 it was announced the production of the sixth season, whom filming started in June 2020 and ended in February 2021. The season was aired from January to March 2021.

In March 2021 the renewal for a seventh season was announced, and the filming started in May 2022. The season aired from January to March 2023, and the protagonist was not Elena Sofia Ricci anymore, but Francesca Chillemi, whose character updated from secondary to protagonist.

In March 2023 an eighth was announced, whose filming started in June 2024 and ended in February 2025. Here, Francesca Chillemi was confirmed as protagonist as Azzurra Leonardi, next to the new entry Giovanni Scifoni. The season aired from February to May 2025.

A ninth season was announced, which will air in 2027.

== Crossover ==
The series had two crossovers: the first with the series Don Matteo, and the second one with the series Un passo dal cielo. This also because these TV series have the same production companies: Lux Vide and Rai Fiction.

The first one was transmitted after the Don Matteo episode that aired on December 8th 2011 on Rai 1, when a short video was transmitted in which Elena Sofia Ricci and Valeria Fabrizi, interpreting sister Angela and sister Costanza, meet the priest-detective interpreted by Terence Hill, which suggests them to call their cafè in Modena "L'Angolo Divino", and then turns to the public saying Che Dio ci aiuti (May God help us).

The second one happened at the end of the seventh season, to anticipate the seventh season of Un passo dal cielo.
