= Souleymane Sylla (actor) =

Guinea-born Italian actor and filmmaker

- Born: Souleymane Sylla; Guinea
- Occupation: Actor
- Years active: 2013–present

Souleymane Sylla is a Guinean-born Italian actor and filmmaker. He is best known for his roles in the films Les princes de la ville, Shiny Happy People and Tolo Tolo.

== Personal life ==
He was born in Guinea and later moved to Italy.

== Career ==
Souleymane Sylla was born in Senegal where he spent his early childhood. He was 8 years old when the family moved to Créteil. It was at the Simone de Beauvoir high school that he discovered theater. Later on he was admitted to the highly selective and prestigious French National Theatre Conservatory. He participated in the opening up of diversity in the theater, notably at the TNS in Strasbourg. Spotted by the director Blandine Savetier, he was hired for the Odyssey serial project, presented in 13 episodes, outdoors, during the 2019 Avignon Festival. From 2013, we see him in several short films, including Anthropology of a modern man, Regulation of a tale and Cutting the veil, in which he plays major roles. He moved to directing in 2012 with Mchinda, l'invaincu, followed in 2015 by Le Costume and Les Princes de la ville in 2016. As the leading role, he performed in Germany for the TV movie Penthesilea by Maximilian Villwock In 2019, he appeared in Jérémie Elkaïm's film, Ils sont vivants, which was not released in France until two years later due to the Covid-19 pandemic. In 2020, he starred in the Italian comedy film Tolo Tolo with the role 'Oumar'. The film became a blockbuster with a record breaking first day gross of €8.7 million.

== Filmography ==
Year	Film	Role	Genre	Ref.
2014	Anthropologie d'un homme moderne	Simon	Short film	
2014	Règlement de conte	Melle Sankaré	Short film	
2014	Couper le voile		Short film	
2016	Panda III		Short film	
2017	Les Roméos et Juliettes	Souley	Short film	
2017	La répétition	Stéphane	Short film	
2018	Penthesilea	Latif	TV movie	
2019	Shiny Happy People	Manu	Short film	
2019	Poseur	Le gardien	Short film	
2019	Bibimbap	Souleymane	Short film	
2019	Checco Zalone: Immigrato	Souleymane Sylla	Video short	
2019	Désir noir, une nuit proche de Dieu	Lui	Short film	
2020	Tolo Tolo	Oumar	Film	
