= List of 2013 box office number-one films in Italy =

This is a list of films which have placed number one at the weekend box office in Italy during 2013.

== Number-one films ==
†	This implies the highest-grossing movie of the year.

#	Date	Film	Weekend Gross	Total Gross
1	January 6, 2013	Mai Stati Uniti	$2,695,665	$7,354,579
2	January 13, 2013	Playing for Keeps	$2,588,681	$6,015,377
3	January 20, 2013	Django Unchained	$4,602,531	$16,283,123
4	January 27, 2013	Django Unchained	$3,459,448	
5	February 3, 2013	Lincoln	$2,114,286	$8,304,392
6	February 10, 2013	Warm Bodies	$1,201,769	$2,316,873
7	February 17, 2013	Il principe abusivo	$5,870,344	$18,614,277
8	February 24, 2013	Il principe abusivo	$4,587,240	
9	March 3, 2013	Il principe abusivo	$2,388,331	
10	March 10, 2013	Oz the Great and Powerful	$3,763,214	$10,420,037
11	March 17, 2013	Oz the Great and Powerful	$2,755,467	
12	March 24, 2013	The Croods	$3,908,695	$15,148,219
13	March 31, 2013	The Croods	$3,483,925	
14	April 7, 2013	The Croods	$1,645,231	
15	April 14, 2013	Oblivion	$2,036,651	$5,596,549
16	April 21, 2013	Scary Movie 5	$1,995,341	$4,211,478
17	April 28, 2013	Iron Man 3	$9,044,472	$20,910,968
18	May 5, 2013	Iron Man 3	$2,799,874	
19	May 12, 2013	Iron Man 3	$1,106,611	
20	May 19, 2013	The Great Gatsby	$3,753,759	$9,366,454
21	May 26, 2013	Fast & Furious 6	$7,449,695	$16,681,782
22	June 2, 2013	The Hangover Part III	$7,952,692	$16,416,593
23	June 9, 2013	The Hangover Part III	$2,922,900	
24	June 16, 2013	Star Trek Into Darkness	$1,149,320	$2,996,987
25	June 23, 2013	Man of Steel	$2,386,577	$6,102,107
26	June 30, 2013	World War Z	$2,628,405	$6,519,137
27	July 7, 2013	The Lone Ranger	$1,467,699	$5,097,256
28	July 14, 2013	Now You See Me	$1,413,086	$5,839,709
29	July 21, 2013	Now You See Me	$878,209	
30	July 28, 2013	The Wolverine	$2,061,874	$6,545,350
31	August 4, 2013	The Wolverine	$1,019,550	
32	August 11, 2013	The Wolverine	$550,237	
33	August 18, 2013	The Wolverine	$345,158	
34	August 25, 2013	Monsters University	$3,082,941	$11,916,082
35	September 1, 2013	Elysium	$2,057,924	$6,378,204
36	September 8, 2013	One Direction: This Is Us	$2,071,069	$2,908,556
37	September 15, 2013	Percy Jackson & The Olympians: The Sea of Monsters	$1,994,158	$4,149,811
38	September 22, 2013	The Smurfs 2	$2,830,670	$9,705,956
39	September 29, 2013	The Smurfs 2	$2,643,205	
40	October 6, 2013	Gravity	$2,751,661	$8,489,388
41	October 13, 2013	Despicable Me 2	$6,994,586	$21,587,196
42	October 20, 2013	Despicable Me 2	$5,052,560	
43	October 27, 2013	Despicable Me 2	$2,797,322	
44	November 3, 2013	Sole a catinelle †	$25,095,006	$69,903,094
45	November 10, 2013	Sole a catinelle †	$14,769,579	
46	November 17, 2013	Sole a catinelle †	$8,598,156	
47	November 24, 2013	Thor: The Dark World	$4,964,804	$11,176,894
48	December 1, 2013	The Hunger Games: Catching Fire	$5,046,438	$11,032,504
49	December 8, 2013	The Hunger Games: Catching Fire	$2,240,078	
50	December 15, 2013	The Hobbit: The Desolation of Smaug	$4,970,550	$17,305,657
51	December 22, 2013	Frozen	$3,155,411	$26,421,884
52	December 29, 2013	Frozen	$8,505,455	
