= Sole a catinelle =

- Directed by: Gennaro Nunziante
- Screenplay by: Gennaro Nunziante; Checco Zalone
- Starring: Checco Zalone; Miriam Dalmazio; Orsetta De Rossi
- Music by: Checco Zalone
- Distributed by: Medusa Film
- Release date: October 31, 2013
- Running time: 90 minutes
- Country: Italy
- Language: Italian
- Budget: approx. €8 millions
- Box office: €51.9 million

Sole a catinelle (lit. '"Sun[light] in basins"', modeled on the expression pioggia a catinelle, "rain in bucketfulls ", which means that it is raining very hard) is a 2013 Italian comedy film directed by Gennaro Nunziante. The film is the fourth highest-grossing Italian film in Italy.

== Plot ==
During the 2008 financial crisis, in 2013, Checco Zalone is a Southern Italian living in Padua together with his wife, Daniela, and son, Nicolò. Checco starts working for a company which sells "Fata Gaia" vacuum cleaners ("Fata", meaning "Fairy", is a parody of the popular Italian Folletto, meaning "Pixie", in other countries Kobold), and becomes very successful by selling them to all his relatives who migrated to Northern Italy, thus becoming the most successful salesman of all time. He starts asking for loans to buy presents for Daniela and Nicolò to a company named "FidoFly". Later, with the success of Vileda robot cleaners and his family having enough Fatas, he starts earning less money, to the point that FidoFly starts taking back the things he bought, while Daniela decides to ask for a divorce. Checco, is forced to eat at Caritas soup kitchens. He swears to his son that, if he gets 100% in his report card he will have a fantastic vacation with him. Nicolò succeeds in this goal, forcing Checco to take him on vacation during the summer holidays. Checco, who has to sell at least seven cleaners or else be fired, travels with his son to his family's home region of Molise with the goal of selling vacuum cleaners to his remaining family members in the South. He decides to stay at the house of his extremely cheapskate aunt, Rita, who tells him that all the other relatives are dead or emigrated to Canada, except for Checco's cousin Onofrio, who already owns a Fata.

During the night, Nicolò phones his mother telling her that Molise is extremely boring and she arranges that her friend Soukaina's family will meet the duo at Piombino, Tuscany and take Nicolò with them. That night, the house is extremely cold (Rita does not want to pay for a heating system), and Checco finds an old electric stove, which he switches on. The next day, they travel to Piombino, but upon seeing that Checco is sad, Nicolò escapes and returns with him. While driving back, the two notice a "Zoo" sign, and enter in a courtyard, where Checco meets a boy who does not answer his questions about the zoo. Checco shouts his sentences and the boy, Lorenzo, finally answers that the Zoo "is here". Checco later meets Zoe, Lorenzo's French mother and director of the "Zoo" (stylized with an "E" inside the second "O") art exhibition, and the boy's psychologist, who suggests to the former to invite the duo to stay with them (who are extremely rich), to help Lorenzo with his problem, which is later revealed to be selective mutism caused by his filmmaker father, Ludovico, who is making a film named "Eutanasia mon amour" (a drama-like metaphor about euthanasia), in which Checco tries to act, but is soon rejected), and whose work is the only thing he cares about. The characters of Vittorio Manieri, a rich Italian entrepreneur and owner of most of Riccardo's (Zoe's deceased father, whose inability to "speak" is misunderstood by Checco as the cause of Lorenzo's selective mutism) former companies (including the company that intends to fire Daniela and many other people), Juliette Marin, Zoe's mother and Vittorio's mistress, and Piergiorgio Bollini, a close friend of Vittorio. The former explains Checco that he and Juliette, despite Zoe's intentions, want to buy FidoFly, but Zoe succeeds in nulling the affair when Checco convinces them that the company is about to fail due to people that "have to pay forty-eight rows" like himself and the fact that FidoFly later finds itself in that situation impresses Manieri and Bollini, who ask him what's his entrepreneur field, and, as he answers that it is the "cleaning" field, they misunderstand that he launders money and reveal their true nature, starting to plan a co-operation with Checco's company: they are actually dishonest Freemasons constantly tracked by the Guardia di Finanza, but both Checco and his boss, Dr. Surace, do not understand their dishonesty, then the former can be sure of not being fired.

Checco soon falls in love and with Zoe, becoming her lover despite already being in love with Daniela, whom, when she sees Checco on television with Manieri and hears about his relationship with Zoe, she forces a syndicalist from her factory to become her sexual partner. Checco discovers this and, feeling extremely sad (with the excuse of not having had any sexual intercourses with Zoe), returns to Milan, where he realizes that Daniela divorced because of his making her work too much. Circa one month later, the two masons have been arrested (probably because the Guardia di Finanza heard their plans while Checco was using Vittorio's phone to speak with Surace) and Zoe has acquired Daniela's company, and invites Checco to speak to the workers, who, dressed as a Soviet minister and with Nicolò carrying a communist flag, reads a message to Daniela about the fact that he wants to be a better man and helping her to work on a replica of Mao Zedong’s Little Red Book. The two fall in love again and Checco becomes a functionary of the company. An epilogue shows us that Checco and Nicolò forgot to switch down the stove at Rita's house and she had a cardiac arrest after she saw the 89-euros electric bill. She is on a bed with a machine monitoring her values, but, when she discovers that it is electrical, she asks Checco to shut it down, in a scene which comically looks like Eutanasia mon amour.

== Cast ==
- Checco Zalone as Checco Zalone
- Miriam Dalmazio as Daniela Parisi
- Robert Dancs as Nicolò Zalone
- Aurore Erguy as Zoe Garnier
- Ruben Aprea as Lorenzo
- Valeria Cavalli as Juliette Marin
- Orsetta De Rossi as Domiziana
- Matilde Caterina as Ritella Cives
- Marco Paolini as Vittorio Manieri
- Lidia Biondi as Carolina

== Reception ==
The film grossed a record €18.6 million on its opening weekend. It was number-one for three consecutive weekends. It grossed a total of US$56.7 million, and became the highest-grossing domestic film in Italy, surpassing Zalone and Nunziante's 2011 film What a Beautiful Day. It is currently the second highest-grossing film in Italy only surpassed by Quo vado? also starring Zalone and directed by Nunziante. Despite the commercial success, the film received generally mixed reviews from critics.

== Remake ==
A Spanish remake film directed by Dani de la Orden was released in 2018: The Best Summer of My Life (El mejor verano de mi vida).

== See also ==
- List of Italian films of 2013
