= Stefano Rosso (businessman) =

Italian businessman (born 1979)

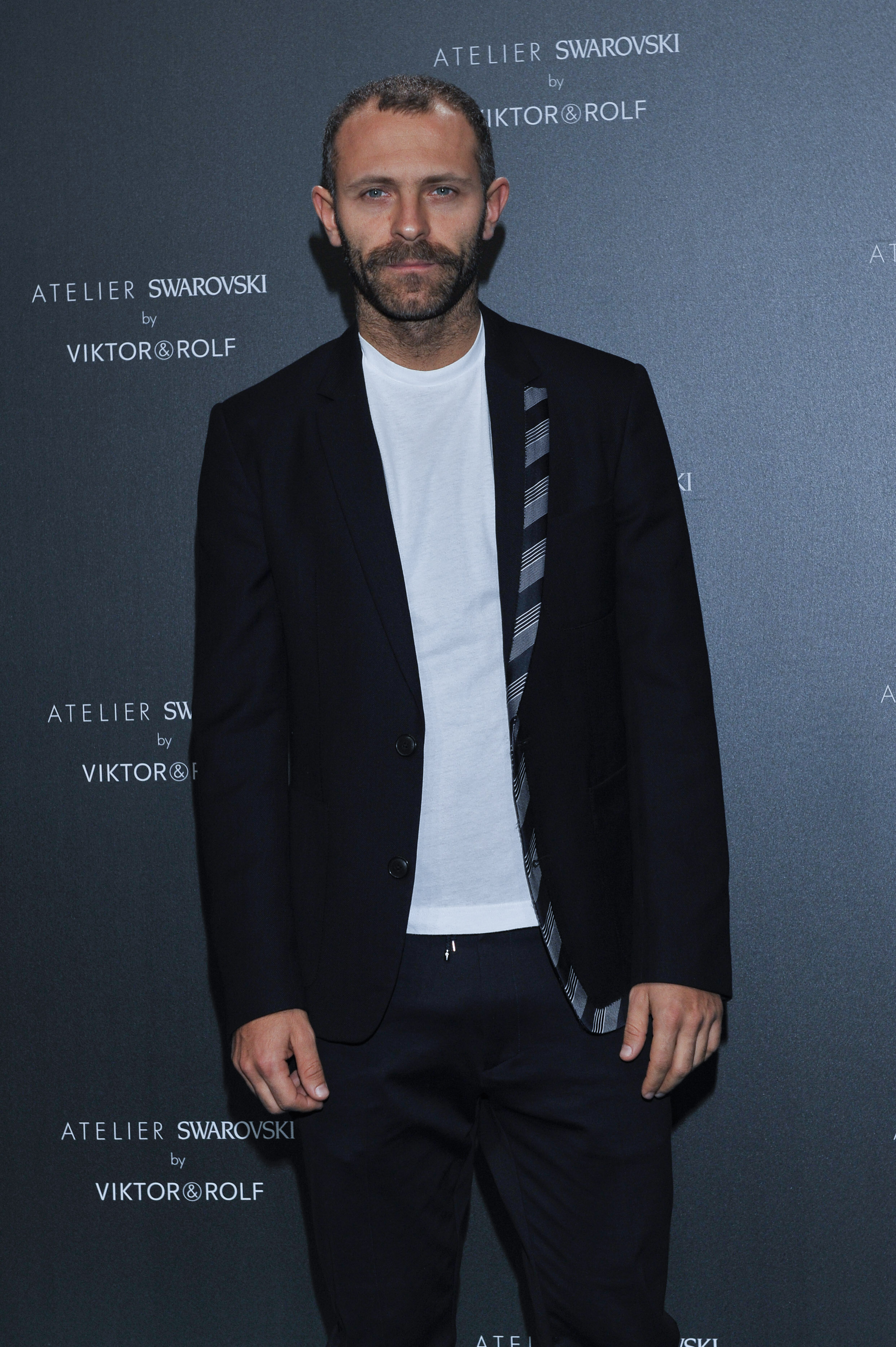
- Born: 1 June 1979 (age 47); Marostica, Veneto, Italy
- Education: Fashion Institute of Technology, New York (BA)
- Occupations: Co-Founder and CEO of D-CAVE; Board member OTB Group; President of L.R. Vicenza; Co-founder of the Red Room Party
- Partner: Francesca Chillemi
- Children: 1

Stefano Rosso (born 1 June 1979) is an Italian businessman and the co-founder and CEO of D-CAVE, a lifestyle platform for the gaming community. He is also board member of OTB Group, the parent company of the fashion brands Diesel, Maison Margiela, Marni, Viktor & Rolf, Staff International and Brave Kid. He is also President of L.R. Vicenza. He is also the cofounder of the Red Room Party.

== Biography ==
=== Early days ===
Stefano Rosso is part of the Rosso family, who owns OTB group. After attending high school in Bassano del Grappa, he left Italy to pursue his studies at the Fashion Institute of Technology in New York, where he completed a BA in International Trade and Marketing.

Stefano Rosso began his work experience outside the family company, collaborating with brands like Zoo York.

=== OTB Group ===
Stefano Rosso returned to Italy in 2005 to become the first brand manager of Diesel's 5 Pockets (denim), and then the Strategic Brand Alliances Director, creating and managing brand global collaborations (Adidas Originals, Ducati).

In July 2011, Stefano Rosso became Director of Corporate Development of OTB Group, the parent company of Diesel, Maison Margiela, Marni, Viktor & Rolf, Staff International, and Brave Kid. In February 2013, he was appointed co-CEO of the group alongside Marina Tosin, succeeding to Daniela Riccardi Stefano Rosso and his brother Andrea each hold 5% of the OTB Group. In October 2014, he named John Galliano creative director of Maison Margiela.

In June 2017, he was appointed CEO of Diesel North America.

=== Other activities ===
Stefano Rosso was also Managing Director of Red Circle Investments (RCI), the private investment company of the Rosso family created in 2011. RCI invests primarily in new technologies, environment and sustainability related companies and start-ups: Yoox, H-Farm (start-up incubator), Depop (social shopping), EcorNaturaSì (organic products and stores). Stefano Rosso sits on the Board of Directors of H-Farm and EcorNaturaSì.

In March 2016, Stefano Rosso was named member of the Federal Council of the Italian Football Federation.

In May 2018, after the OTB group purchased the L.R. Vicenza Virtus soccer team, Stefano Rosso announced the merger of Vicenza Virtus and Bassano Virtus teams into a single club. Stefano Rosso is the president of the L.R. Vicenza soccer team since 2018.

In 2020, Stefano Rosso joined the advisory board of TechTalia an annual technology event held in Italy along with Francesca Versace and Giulia Maresca.

== Personal life ==
Stefano Rosso is in a relationship with Francesca Chillemi. They had a daughter together in 2016 and moved to New York the following year.
