= Ludovica Modugno =

Italian actress (1949–2021)

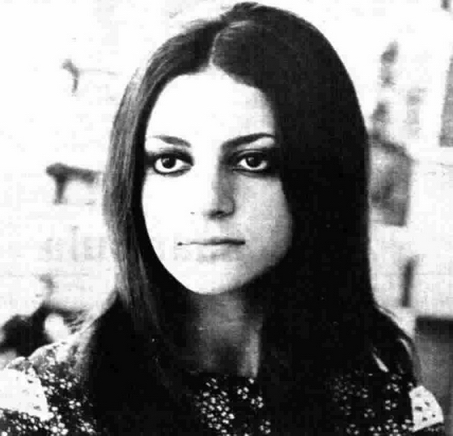
- Modugno in 1973
- Born: 12 January 1949; Rome, Italy
- Died: 26 October 2021 (aged 72); Rome, Italy
- Occupations: Actress; voice actress; dubbing director
- Years active: 1953–2021
- Spouse: Gigi Angelillo (died 2015)
- Relatives: Paolo Modugno (brother)

Ludovica Modugno (12 January 1949 – 26 October 2021) was an Italian actress and voice actress.

== Biography ==
Modugno was born in Rome on 12 January 1949. She made her debut at the age of four in the film Il Dottor Antonio. She debuted in dubbing in 1955 with the film Miracle of Marcelino. In 1978, she founded the theatre company L'albero alongside Gigi Angelillo. In 2008, she won the best theatre actress prize from the Associazione Nazionale Critici di Teatro. As a voice actress, she is the regular dubbing voice of Glenn Close.

Modugno was the sister of actor and radio host Paolo Modugno and the wife of actor and director Gigi Angelillo.

== Death ==
Modugno died in Rome on 26 October 2021, at the age of 72, due to complications from an illness that struck her in June.

== Filmography ==
=== Cinema ===
- Italiani! È severamente proibito servirsi della toilette durante le fermate (1969)
- Non ho tempo (1973)
- Volevo i pantaloni (1990)
- Cominciò tutto per caso (1993)
- Mille bolle blu (1993)
- Camerieri (1995)
- Heartless (1995)
- Bruno aspetta in macchina (1996)
- Gratta e vinci (1996)
- Gli inaffidabili (1997)
- Kaputt Mundi (1998)
- Come tu mi vuoi (2007)
- Wedding Fever in Campobello (2009)
- The Big Dream (2009)
- Cado dalle nubi (2009)
- What's Your Sign? (2014)
- Quo Vado? (2016)
- Magical Nights (2018)
- Il grande passo (2019)

=== Television ===
- Cime tempestose (1956)
- Il romanzo di un maestro (1959)
- La Pisana (1960)
- Tutte le domeniche mattina (1972)
- Joe Petrosino (1972)
- L'avvocato delle donne (1997)
- Il maresciallo Rocca (2001)
- Una donna per amico (2001)
- Edda (2005)
- Distretto di Polizia (2010)
- Un cane per due (2010)
- Al di là del lago (2011)
- Sposami (2012)
