= List of highest-grossing films in Italy =

This list charts the most successful films at cinemas in Italy by box office sales, in euros and admissions. It also lists the most popular Italian productions in terms of admissions.

== Highest-grossing films by box office revenue ==
The following is a list of the highest-grossing films in Italy (nominally, without adjustment for inflation). The list is topped by Buen Camino, starring Checco Zalone, which surpassed James Cameron's Avatar (2009) to take the local record. Zalone has four other films in the top ten, Quo Vado? (2016), Sole a catinelle (2013), What a Beautiful Day (2011) and Tolo Tolo (2020). Prior to these Italian films, the highest-grossing Italian film was Roberto Benigni's Life Is Beautiful (1997). This remains the highest-grossing Italian film worldwide with a gross of over $230 million. Of the current top 20, Titanic has the most admissions with 13.8 million, which ranks 12th all-time in Italy.

Films that are currently playing in cinemas

Rank	Title	Year	Gross (€)	Tickets sold
1*	Buen Camino	2025	76,588,207	9,566,530
2	Avatar	2009	68,675,442	7,919,514
3*	Quo vado?	2016	65,365,676	9,368,154
4	The Odyssey	2026	58,962,178	7,032,636
5*	Sole a catinelle	2013	51,948,550	8,005,352
6	Titanic	1998	51,890,733	13,883,668
7	Inside Out 2	2024	46,536,398	6,358,592
8*	Tolo Tolo	2020	46,201,300	6,674,622
9	Avatar: The Way of Water	2022	44,798,350	5,058,147
10*	What a Beautiful Day	2011	43,475,840	6,831,460
11	Spider-Man: Brand New Day	2026	38,603,761	4,805,109
12	The Lion King	2019	37,514,061	5,694,038
13*	There's Still Tomorrow	2023	36,795,665	5,441,291
14	The Devil Wears Prada 2	2026	32,210,633	4,042,554
15	Barbie	2023	32,122,053	4,390,410
16*	Life Is Beautiful	1997	31,231,984	9,702,524
17	Alice in Wonderland	2010	30,397,548	3,511,206
18	Avengers: Endgame	2019	30,282,559	4,098,421
19*	Benvenuti al Sud	2010	29,841,490	4,903,480
20	Ice Age: Dawn of the Dinosaurs	2009	29,705,584	4,055,708
21	Joker	2019	29,566,127	4,228,544
22	Bohemian Rhapsody	2018	29,053,485	4,154,275
23	The Da Vinci Code	2006	28,690,407	4,656,409
24	Oppenheimer	2023	28,575,430	3,748,968
25*	Ask Me If I'm Happy	2000	28,458,894	6,855,948
26*	Christmas on the Nile	2002	28,297,578	
27*	Il Ciclone	1996	28,085,461	
28*	Benvenuti al Nord	2012	27,194,040	4,288,827
29	Harry Potter and the Philosopher's Stone	2001	27,180,294	
30*	Pinocchio	2002	26,197,231	
Films marked as * are Italian productions

== Most admissions ==
The following are the films with the most cinema admissions in Italy since 1945. Doctor Zhivago (1966) tops the list with 22.9 million admissions. War and Peace (1956), in fifth place with 15.7 million admissions, is the highest placed Italian production.

Background colour indicates films currently in cinemas

Rank	Title	Year	Tickets sold	Country
1	Doctor Zhivago	1966	22,900,000	United Kingdom
2	The Godfather	1972	21,827,533	United States
3	The Ten Commandments	1956	16,800,000	United States
4	Goldfinger	1964	15,800,000	United Kingdom
5	War and Peace	1956	15,707,723	Italy; United States
6	Last Tango in Paris	1972	15,623,773	Italy; France
7	Ben-Hur	1959	15,400,000	United States
8	A Fistful of Dollars	1964	14,797,275	Italy; Spain; West Germany
9	Trinity Is Still My Name	1971	14,554,172	Italy
10	For a Few Dollars More	1965	14,543,161	Italy; Spain; West Germany
11	Thunderball	1965	14,100,000	United Kingdom
12	Titanic	1998	13,883,668	United States
13	La Dolce Vita	1960	13,617,148	Italy; France
14	Little World of Don Camillo	1952	13,215,653	Italy; France
15	Ulysses	1954	13,170,322	Italy
16	The Leopard	1963	12,850,375	Italy; France
17	Love Is a Many-Splendored Thing	1955	12,600,000	United States
18	Beautiful but Dangerous	1955	12,592,231	Italy; France
19	Malicious	1973	11,756,327	Italy
20	Miracle of Marcelino	1955	11,559,217	Spain; Italy
21	The Good, the Bad and the Ugly	1966	11,364,221	Italy
22	The Longest Day	1962	11,300,000	United States
23	Watch Out, We're Mad!	1974	11,246,906	Italy; Spain
24	The Bible: In the Beginning...	1966	11,245,980	United States; Italy
25	Il Decameron	1971	11,167,557	Italy

== Most admissions for Italian productions ==
The following are the Italian films (including co-productions) with the most cinema admissions in Italy since 1950. The leader, War and Peace (1956), is ranked fifth when considering productions from other countries (see above table). Of films listed in the highest-grossing list above, Life Is Beautiful, with 9.7 million admissions, ranks 31st and Quo Vado?, with 9.4 million admissions, 34th.

Background colour indicates films currently in cinemas

Rank	Title	Year	Tickets sold	Country
1	War and Peace	1956	15,707,723	Italy; United States
2	Last Tango in Paris	1972	15,623,773	Italy; France
3	A Fistful of Dollars	1964	14,797,275	Italy; Spain; West Germany
4	Trinity Is Still My Name	1971	14,554,172	Italy
5	For a Few Dollars More	1965	14,543,161	Italy; Spain; West Germany
6	La Dolce Vita	1960	13,617,148	Italy; France
7	Little World of Don Camillo	1952	13,215,653	Italy; France
8	Ulysses	1954	13,170,322	Italy
9	The Leopard	1963	12,850,375	Italy; France
10	Beautiful but Dangerous	1955	12,592,231	Italy; France
11	Malicious	1973	11,756,327	Italy
12	Miracle of Marcelino	1955	11,559,217	Spain; Italy
13	The Good, the Bad and the Ugly	1966	11,364,221	Italy
14	Watch Out, We're Mad!	1974	11,246,906	Italy; Spain
15	The Bible: In the Beginning...	1966	11,245,980	United States; Italy

== See also ==
- Lists of highest-grossing films
