= Checco Zalone =

Italian comedian (born 1977)

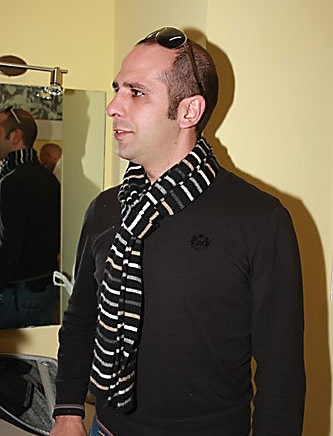
- Zalone in 2008
- Born: Luca Pasquale Medici; 3 June 1977 (age 49); Bari, Italy
- Occupations: Comedian; actor; filmmaker
- Height: 1.73 m (5 ft 8 in)

Luca Pasquale Medici (born 3 June 1977), best known as Checco Zalone (Italian pronunciation: [ˈkekko ddzaˈloːne]; modelled on the Italianised Barese insult Che cozzalone!, lit. 'What a boor!'), is an Italian comedian, actor, showman, singer, musician, cabaret performer, screenwriter, director, and film producer. He co-wrote and starred in a series of comedy films that achieved significant success at the box office, such as Cado dalle nubi (2009), What a Beautiful Day (2011), Sole a catinelle (2013), Quo vado? (2016), Tolo Tolo (2020), and Buen Camino (2025), the latter of which became the highest-grossing film in Italy.

== Early life and education ==
Zalone was born as Luca Pasquale Medici in Bari on 3 June 1977. The pseudonym Checco Zalone recalls the local expression "Che cozzalone!" meaning "What a boor!" He graduated from the scientific high school Sante Simone in Conversano; he later enrolled at the University of Bari, where he graduated in law. In the meantime, he competed as a deputy police inspector and INAIL in Rimini but was rejected.

== Career ==
After being a regular in many editions of the Canale 5 variety show Zelig, Zalone became famous in 2006 thanks to the song "Siamo una squadra fortissimi" (meaning "We Are a Very Strong Team" in broken Italian), celebrating the Italy national football team just before the 2006 FIFA World Cup. In 2009, he co-wrote and starred in Cado dalle nubi, co-written by Gennaro Nunziante, who also directed. In 2011, he again co-wrote and starred in What a Beautiful Day, also co-written and directed by Nunziante. It opened with a record Italian opening weekend of $9.4 million, and became the highest-grossing film in Italy, grossing €43.4 million, surpassing Roberto Benigni's Life Is Beautiful. Life Is Beautiful retained the worldwide record for an Italian film with $70 million worldwide.

In 2013, Zalone and Nunziante followed it up with Sole a catinelle, which surpassed it with an opening record of €19.2 million and a total gross of €51.9 million. In January 2016, his and Nunziante's next film Quo vado? set another opening weekend record grossing over €22 million (£16.5 million) over the three-day holiday weekend, and went on to become the highest grossing Italian film of all time, with €65.3 million, second only to Avatar by James Cameron with €65.7 million. In the same year, Zalone was the Italian spokesperson for a fundraising campaign for spinal muscular atrophy research. His and Nunziate's films became the second, third, fifth, and sixth highest-grossing films in Italy. On 30 April 2021, Zalone released the video of his song "La vacinada" (meaning "The Vaccinated Woman" in pseudo-Spanish), starring English actress Helen Mirren. In the song, Zalone jokes about the fact that in times of the COVID-19 pandemic it is safer to have an affair with someone who has already been vaccinated against COVID-19, and therefore the best option is an older partner as the elderly were vaccinated first.

In 2022, Zalone performed a medley at the Sanremo Music Festival. On 17 December 2025, he released a promotional short titled "Prostata enflamada" (meaning "Inflamed Prostate" in pseudo-Spanish) to promote the launch of the film Buen Camino. In 2025, the challenge for the Italian cinema record at the box office with Avatar continued as Buen Camino came out around the same time of Avatar: Fire and Ash. Zalone himself joked about it with humorous jokes with the audience, making it seem like Cameron is wondering "who the f... is this Zalone!" Buen Camino contained memorable comic scenes such as when he travels the Camino de Santiago in a Ferrari Portofino, telling a walker that he was doing "the cammino of Maranello, more comfortable and more beautiful!" Furthermore, Zalone responded to critics, particularly those who criticized his previous film, Tolo Tolo (2020), addressing migrants' issues of being too overtly politically correct, stating: "Politically correct? Better to be intelligently incorrect." On the film's first opening day, Christmas Day, it grossed €5.6 million at the box office and reaching almost €14 million on the second day, proving to be well received by the public.

== Filmography ==
=== Films ===
Year	Title	Role(s)	Notes
2009	Cado dalle nubi	Himself	Also writer
2011	What a Beautiful Day	Himself	Also writer
2013	Sole a catinelle	Himself	Also writer
2016	Quo vado?	Himself	Also writer
2020	Tolo Tolo	Himself	Also writer and director
2025	Buen Camino	Himself	Also writer and editor
