= Gennaro Nunziante =

Italian film director

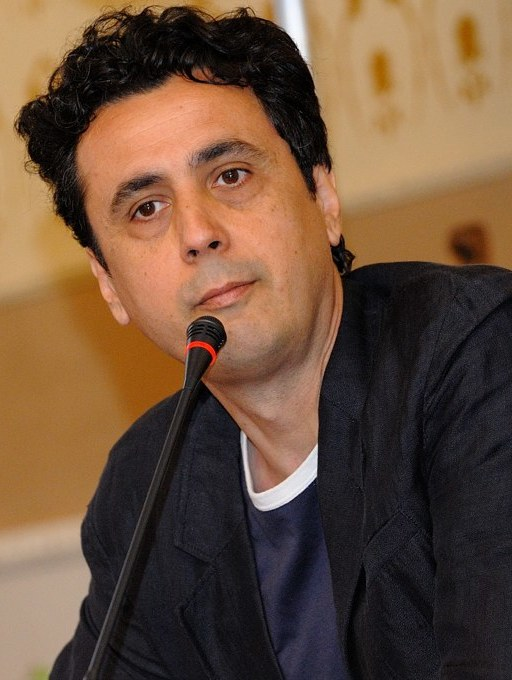
- Occupation: Film director

Gennaro Nunziante is an Italian film director. He directed the three highest-grossing Italian films in Italy headed by Quo Vado?.

== Career ==
He teamed up with Checco Zalone to write Cado dalle nubi (2009), with Zalone starring and Nunziante directing.

They followed it up in 2011 with What a Beautiful Day. It opened with a record Italian opening weekend of $9.4 million and became the highest-grossing Italian film of all-time in Italy, grossing €43.4 million, surpassing Roberto Benigni's Life Is Beautiful. Life Is Beautiful retained the worldwide grossing record for an Italian film with $70 million worldwide.

In 2013, he and Zalone followed it up with Sole a catinelle which surpassed it with an opening record of €19.2 million and a total Italian gross of €51.9 million.

In January 2016, his and Zalone's next film Quo Vado? set another opening weekend record grossing over €22m over the three-day holiday weekend and went on to become the highest-grossing Italian film of all-time with €65.3 million, second only to Avatar in Italy with €65.7 million.

His and Zalone's films are currently the second, third and fifth highest-grossing films in Italy.

== Filmography ==
- Cado dalle nubi (2009)
- What a Beautiful Day (2011)
- Sole a catinelle (2013)
- Quo Vado? (2016)
- Il vegetale (2018)
- Belli ciao (2022)
- Come può uno scoglio (2023)
- I Am the End of the World (2025)
- Buen Camino (2025)
