= Pietro Valsecchi =

Italian film and television producer (born 1953)

- Born: June 14, 1953 (age 72); Crema, Italy
- Occupations: Film and television producer

Pietro Valsecchi (born 14 June 1953 in Crema, Italy) is an Italian film and television producer. In 1991, he and Camilla Nesbitt founded the Italian production company Taodue. In 1995, he won the David di Donatello for Best Producer for his film Un eroe borghese. In 2016, he won the Nastro d'argento for best producer, with Quo Vado?, Chiamatemi Francesco and Don't Be Bad.
