= 52nd British Academy Film Awards =

1999 film awards ceremony

- Date: 11 April 1999
- Site: Business Design Centre
- Hosted by: Jonathan Ross

Highlights
- Best Film: Shakespeare in Love
- Best British Film: Elizabeth
- Best Actor: Roberto Benigni; Life Is Beautiful
- Best Actress: Cate Blanchett; Elizabeth
- Most awards: Elizabeth (5)
- Most nominations: Shakespeare in Love (15)

The 52nd British Academy Film Awards, more commonly known as the BAFTAs, took place on 11 April 1999 at the Business Design Centre in London, honouring the best national and foreign films of 1998. Presented by the British Academy of Film and Television Arts, accolades were handed out for the best feature-length film and documentaries of any nationality that were screened at British cinemas in 1998.

Shakespeare in Love won the award for Best Film (and previously won the Academy Award for Best Picture) and three other awards. Elizabeth was voted Outstanding British Film. Both Cate Blanchett and Judi Dench won awards for their portrayals of Queen Elizabeth I, while Geoffrey Rush won the award for Best Supporting Actor. Italian actor Roberto Benigni won the award for Best Actor in a Leading Role for his performance in Life Is Beautiful; he previously won the Academy Award for Best Actor. Peter Weir, director of The Truman Show, won for his direction.

The nominations were announced on 1 March 1999 and the ceremony was hosted by Jonathan Ross. Elizabethan films received an overall total of twenty-eight nominations, winning nine.

== Winners and nominees ==
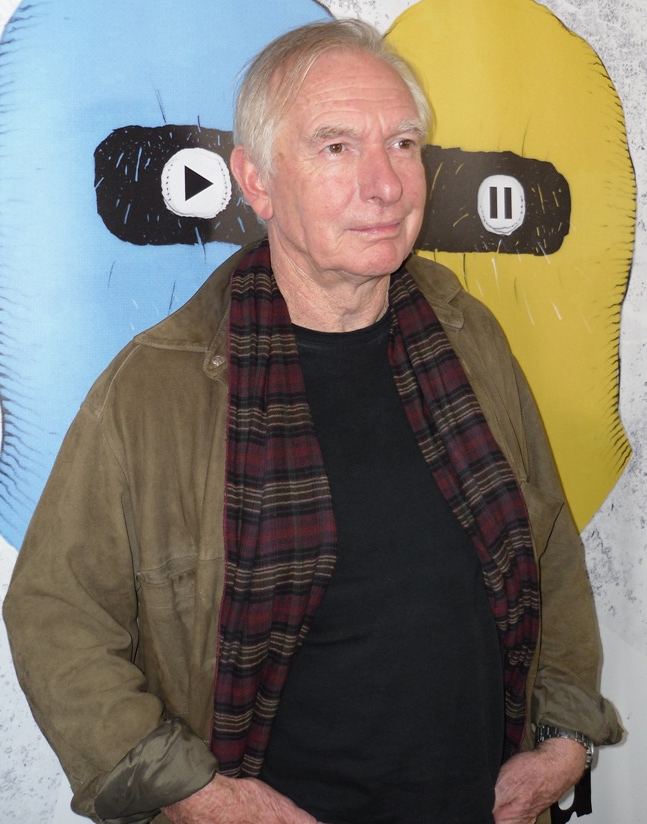
Peter Weir, Best Director winner

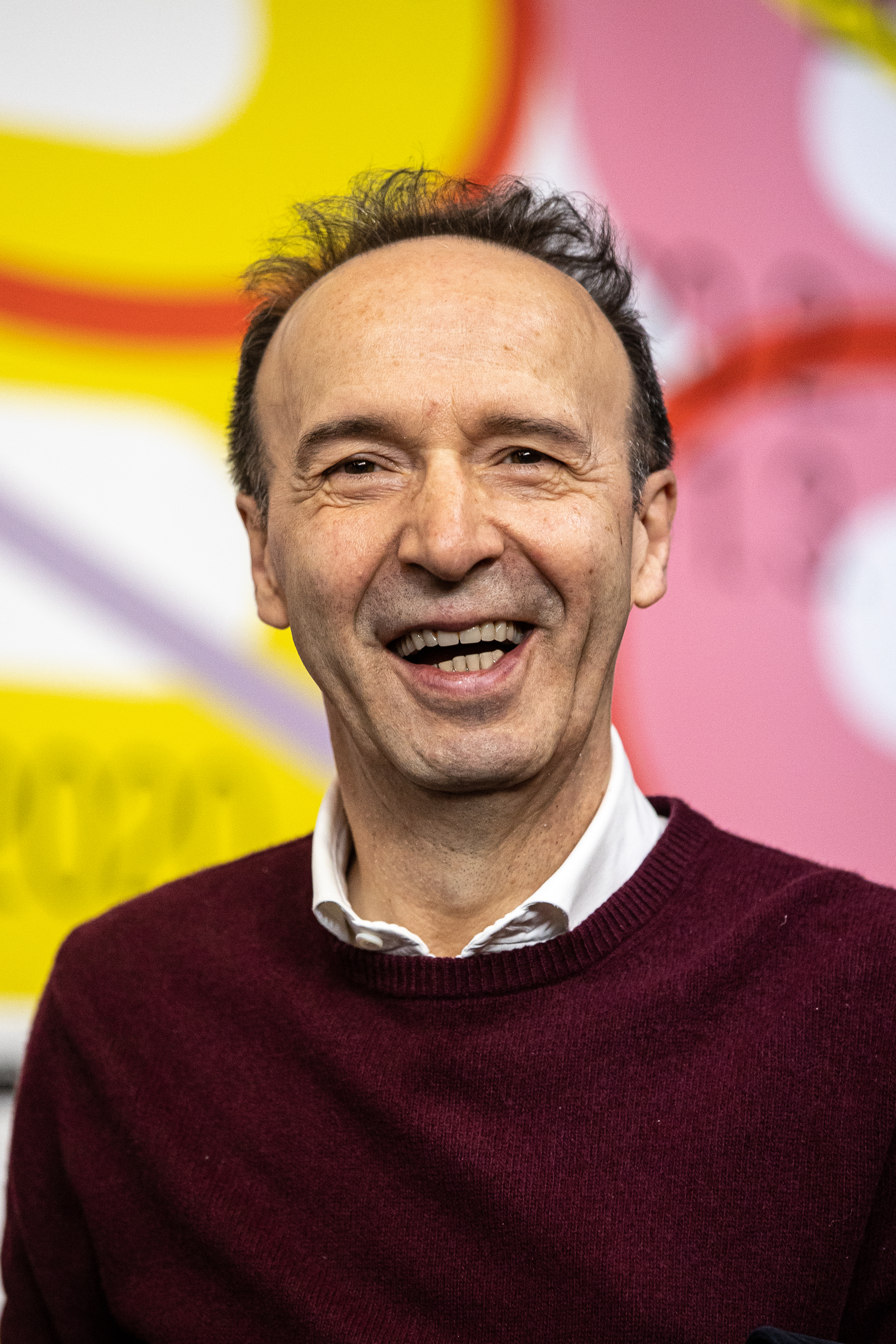
Roberto Benigni, Best Actor winner

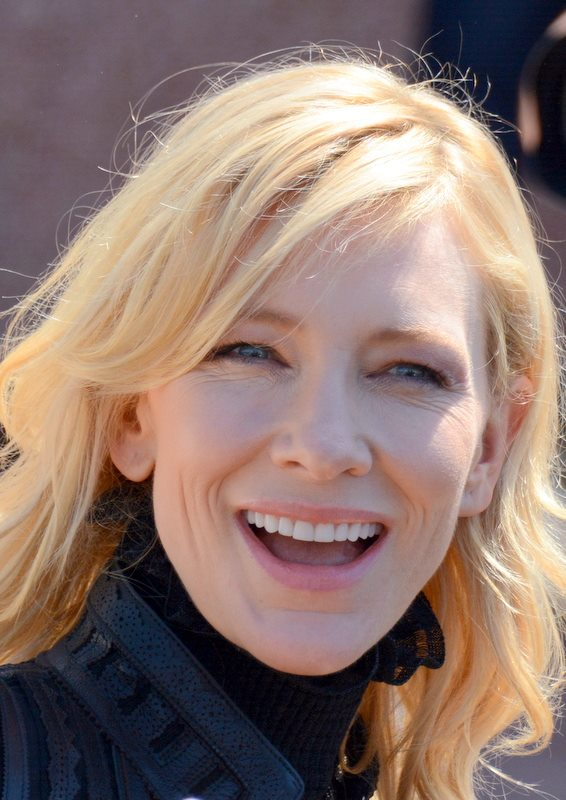
Cate Blanchett, Best Actress winner

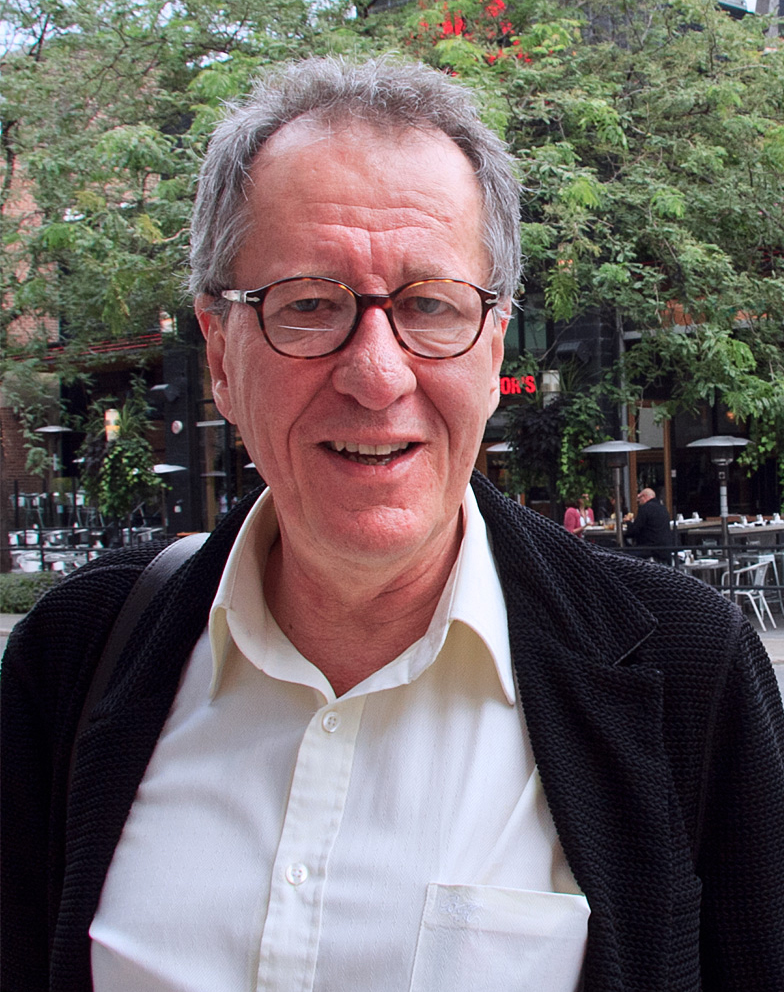
Geoffrey Rush, Best Supporting Actor winner

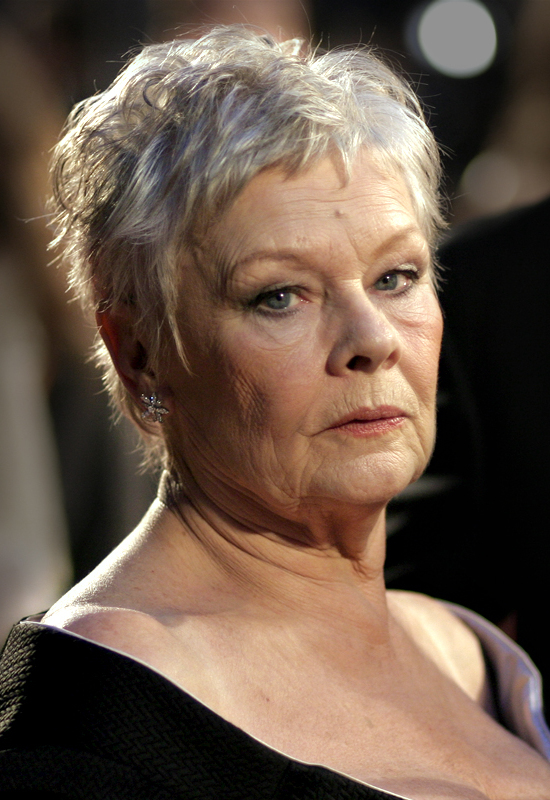
Judi Dench, Best Supporting Actress winner

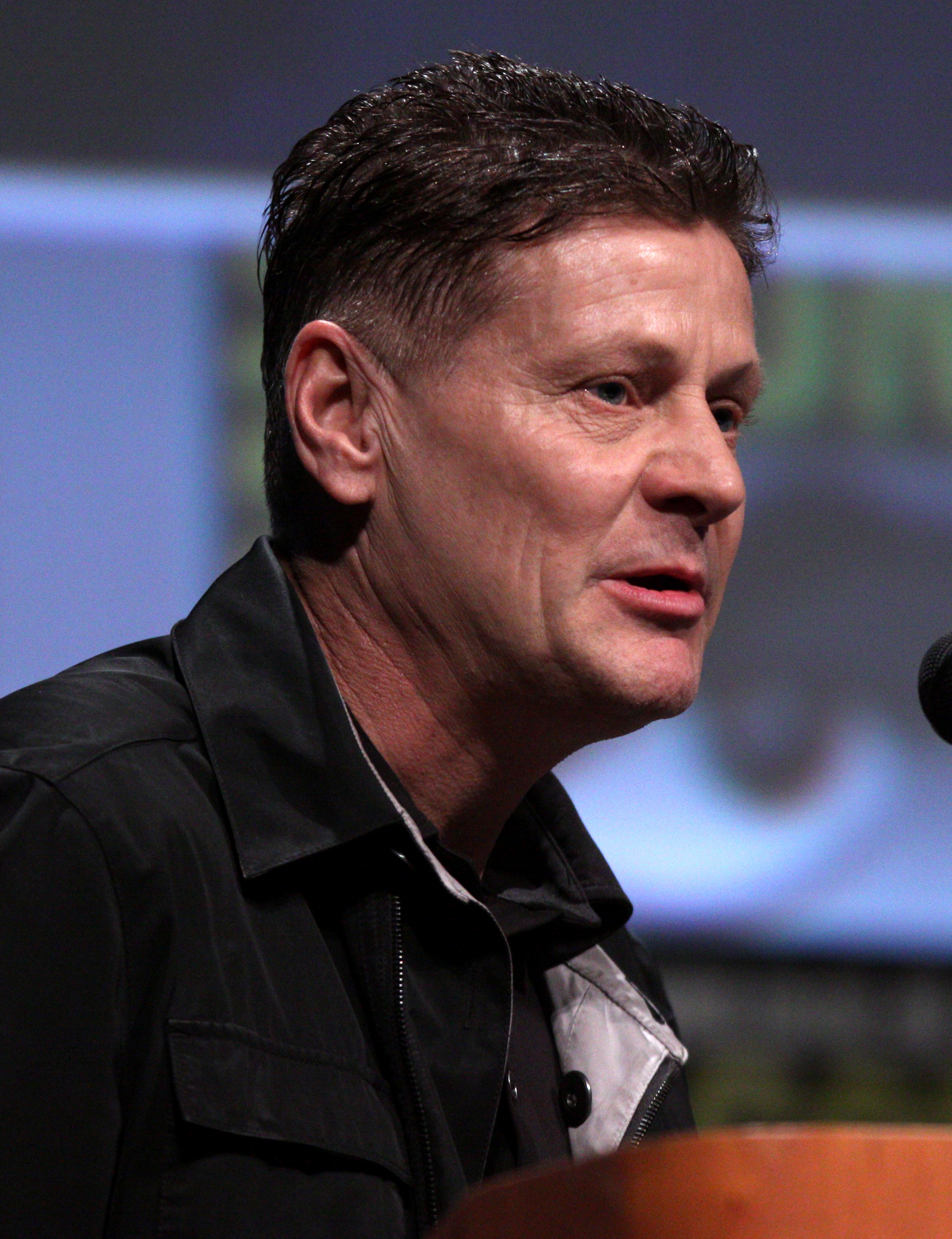
Andrew Niccol, Best Original Screenplay winner

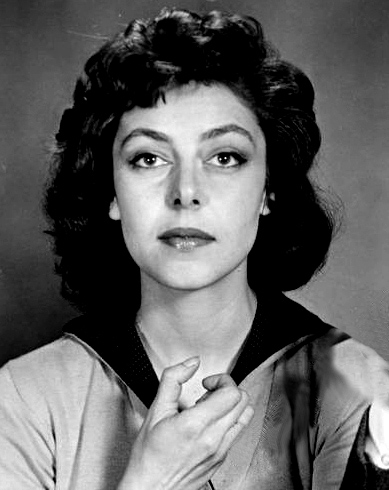
Elaine May, Best Adapted Screenplay winner

=== BAFTA Fellowship ===
- **Elizabeth Taylor**

=== Outstanding British Contribution to Cinema ===
- **Michael Kuhn**

=== Awards ===
Winners are listed first and highlighted in boldface.

**Best Film**: **Shakespeare in Love – David Parfitt, Donna Gigliotti, Harvey Weinstein, Edward Zwick and Marc Norman**; Elizabeth – Alison Owen, Eric Fellner and Tim Bevan; Saving Private Ryan – Steven Spielberg, Ian Bryce, Mark Gordon and Gary Levinsohn; The Truman Show – Scott Rudin, Andrew Niccol, Edward S. Feldman and Adam Schroeder	**Best Direction**: **Peter Weir – The Truman Show**; Shekhar Kapur – Elizabeth; John Madden – Shakespeare in Love; Steven Spielberg – Saving Private Ryan
**Best Actor in a Leading Role**: **Roberto Benigni – Life Is Beautiful as Guido Orefice**; Michael Caine – Little Voice as Ray Say; Joseph Fiennes – Shakespeare in Love as William Shakespeare; Tom Hanks – Saving Private Ryan as Captain John H. Miller	**Best Actress in a Leading Role**: **Cate Blanchett – Elizabeth as Queen Elizabeth I**; Jane Horrocks – Little Voice as Laura Hoff; Gwyneth Paltrow – Shakespeare in Love as Viola de Lesseps; Emily Watson – Hilary and Jackie as Jacqueline du Pré
**Best Actor in a Supporting Role**: **Geoffrey Rush – Shakespeare in Love as Philip Henslowe**; Ed Harris – The Truman Show as Christof; Geoffrey Rush – Elizabeth as Francis Walsingham; Tom Wilkinson – Shakespeare in Love as Hugh Fennyman	**Best Actress in a Supporting Role**: **Judi Dench – Shakespeare in Love as Queen Elizabeth I**; Kathy Bates – Primary Colors as Libby Holden; Brenda Blethyn – Little Voice as Mari Hoff; Lynn Redgrave – Gods and Monsters as Hanna
**Best Original Screenplay**: **The Truman Show – Andrew Niccol**; Elizabeth – Michael Hirst; Life Is Beautiful – Vincenzo Cerami and Roberto Benigni; Shakespeare in Love – Marc Norman and Tom Stoppard	**Best Adapted Screenplay**: **Primary Colors – Elaine May**; Hilary and Jackie – Frank Cottrell-Boyce; Little Voice – Mark Herman; Wag the Dog – Hilary Henkin and David Mamet
**Best Cinematography**: **Elizabeth – Remi Adefarasin**; Saving Private Ryan – Janusz Kamiński; Shakespeare in Love – Richard Greatrex; The Truman Show – Peter Biziou	**Best Costume Design**: **Velvet Goldmine – Sandy Powell**; Elizabeth – Alexandra Byrne; The Mask of Zorro – Graciela Mazon; Shakespeare in Love – Sandy Powell
**Best Editing**: **Shakespeare in Love – David Gamble**; Elizabeth – Jill Bilcock; Lock, Stock and Two Smoking Barrels – Niven Howie; Saving Private Ryan – Michael Kahn	**Best Makeup and Hair**: **Elizabeth – Jenny Shircore**; Saving Private Ryan – Lois Burwell and Jeanette Freeman; Shakespeare in Love – Lisa Westcott; Velvet Goldmine – Peter King
**Best Original Music**: **Elizabeth – David Hirschfelder**; Hilary and Jackie – Barrington Pheloung; Saving Private Ryan – John Williams; Shakespeare in Love – Stephen Warbeck	**Best Production Design**: **The Truman Show – Dennis Gassner**; Elizabeth – John Myhre; Saving Private Ryan – Thomas E. Sanders; Shakespeare in Love – Martin Childs
**Best Sound**: **Saving Private Ryan – Gary Rydstrom, Ron Judkins, Gary Summers, Andy Nelson and Richard Hymns**; Hilary and Jackie – Nigel Heath, Julian Slater, David Crozier, Ray Merrin and Graham Daniel; Little Voice – Peter Lindsay, Rodney Glenn, Ray Merrin and Graham Daniel; Shakespeare in Love – Peter Glossop, John Downer, Robin O'Donoghue and Dominic Lester	**Best Special Visual Effects**: **Saving Private Ryan – Stefen Fangmeier, Roger Guyett and Neil Corbould**; Antz – Ken Bielenberg, Philippe Gluckman, John Bell and Kendal Cronkhite; Babe: Pig in the City – Bill Westenhofer, Neal Scanlan, Chris Godfrey and Grahame Andrew; The Truman Show – Michael J. McAlister, Brad Kuehn, Craig Barron and Peter Chesney
**Outstanding British Film**: **Elizabeth – Alison Owen, Eric Fellner, Tim Bevan and Shekhar Kapur**; Hilary and Jackie – Andy Paterson, Nicolas Kent and Anand Tucker; Little Voice – Elizabeth Karlsen and Mark Herman; Lock, Stock and Two Smoking Barrels – Matthew Vaughn and Guy Ritchie; My Name Is Joe – Rebecca O'Brien and Ken Loach; Sliding Doors – Sydney Pollack, Philippa Braithwaite, William Horberg and Peter Howitt	**Outstanding Debut by a British Writer, Director or Producer**: **Love and Death on Long Island – Richard Kwietniowski (Writer/Director)**; The Governess – Sandra Goldbacher (Writer/Director); Lock, Stock and Two Smoking Barrels – Matthew Vaughn (Producer); Twenty Four Seven – Shane Meadows (Writer/Director)
**Best Short Animation**: **The Canterbury Tales – Aida Zyablikova, Renat Zinnurov, Ashley Potter, Dave Antrobus, Claire Jennings, Mic Graves, Joanna Quinn, Les Mills and Jonathan Myerson**; 1001 Nights – Yukio Sonoyama and Mike Smith; Gogwana – Helen Nobarro, Deiniol Morris, Sion Jones, Michael Mart and Joe Turner; Humdrum – Carla Shelley, Michael Rose and Peter Peake	**Best Short Film**: **Home – Hannah Lewis, Morag McKinnon and Colin McLaren**; Anthrakitts – Natasha Dack and Sara Sugarman; Eight – Jon Finn, Stephen Daldry and Tim Clague; In Memory of Dorothy Bennett – Catherine McArthur and Martin Radich
**Best Film Not in the English Language**: **Central Station – Arthur Cohn, Martine de Clermont-Tonnerre and Walter Salles**; Life Is Beautiful – Elda Ferri, Gianluigi Braschi and Roberto Benigni; Live Flesh – Agustín Almodóvar and Pedro Almodóvar; On Guard – Patrick Godeau and Philippe de Broca

== Statistics ==
Films that received multiple nominations
Nominations	Film
15	Shakespeare in Love
12	Elizabeth
10	Saving Private Ryan
7	The Truman Show
6	Little Voice
5	Hilary and Jackie
3	Life Is Beautiful
3	Lock, Stock and Two Smoking Barrels
2	Primary Colors
2	Velvet Goldmine

Films that received multiple awards
Awards	Film
5	Elizabeth
4	Shakespeare in Love
3	The Truman Show
2	Saving Private Ryan

== See also ==
- 71st Academy Awards
- 24th César Awards
- 4th Critics' Choice Awards
- 51st Directors Guild of America Awards
- 12th European Film Awards
- 56th Golden Globe Awards
- 10th Golden Laurel Awards
- 19th Golden Raspberry Awards
- 3rd Golden Satellite Awards
- 13th Goya Awards
- 14th Independent Spirit Awards
- 4th Lumière Awards
- 25th Saturn Awards
- 5th Screen Actors Guild Awards
- 51st Writers Guild of America Awards
