= Critics' Choice Movie Award for Best Picture =

Award given by the Critics Choice Association

- Awarded for: Best Motion Picture
- Location: Los Angeles, California
- Presented by: Critics Choice Association
- Established: 1995
- First award: Sense and Sensibility
- Currently held by: One Battle After Another (2025)
- Website: www.criticschoice.com

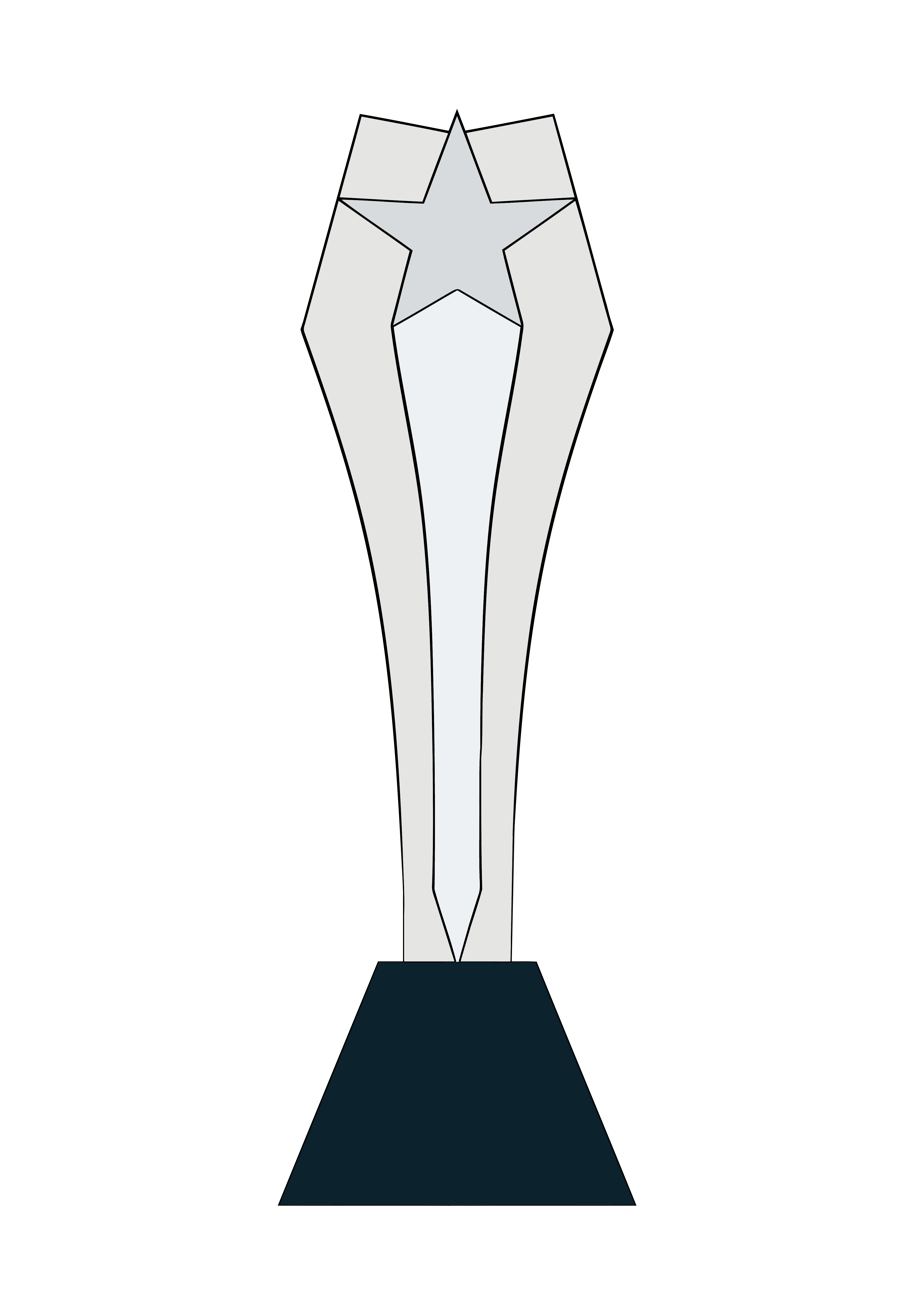
Stylized silhouette icon of the Critics' Choice Movie Award

The Critics' Choice Movie Award for Best Picture is one of the awards given to people working in the film industry by the Critics Choice Association at the annual Critics' Choice Movie Awards.

== Winners and nominees ==
indicates the winner

=== 1990s ===
Year	Film	Director(s)
1995	Sense and Sensibility	Ang Lee
1996	Fargo	Joel Coen and Ethan Coen
1996	Big Night	Campbell Scott and Stanley Tucci
1996	The Crucible	Nicholas Hytner
1996	The English Patient ‡	Anthony Minghella
1996	Evita	Alan Parker
1996	Hamlet	Kenneth Branagh
1996	Jerry Maguire	Cameron Crowe
1996	Lone Star	John Sayles
1996	The People vs. Larry Flynt	Miloš Forman
1996	Shine	Scott Hicks
1997	L.A. Confidential	Curtis Hanson
1997	Amistad	Steven Spielberg
1997	As Good as It Gets	James L. Brooks
1997	Boogie Nights	Paul Thomas Anderson
1997	Donnie Brasco	Mike Newell
1997	Good Will Hunting	Gus Van Sant
1997	The Full Monty	Peter Cattaneo
1997	Titanic ‡	James Cameron
1997	Wag the Dog	Barry Levinson
1997	The Wings of the Dove	Iain Softley
1998	Saving Private Ryan	Steven Spielberg
1998	Elizabeth	Shekhar Kapur
1998	Gods and Monsters	Bill Condon
1998	Life Is Beautiful	Roberto Benigni
1998	Out of Sight	Steven Soderbergh
1998	Pleasantville	Gary Ross
1998	Shakespeare in Love ‡	John Madden
1998	A Simple Plan	Sam Raimi
1998	The Thin Red Line	Terrence Malick
1998	The Truman Show	Peter Weir
1999	American Beauty ‡	Sam Mendes
1999	Being John Malkovich	Spike Jonze
1999	The Cider House Rules	Lasse Hallström
1999	The Green Mile	Frank Darabont
1999	The Insider	Michael Mann
1999	Magnolia	Paul Thomas Anderson
1999	Man on the Moon	Miloš Forman
1999	The Sixth Sense	M. Night Shyamalan
1999	The Talented Mr. Ripley	Anthony Minghella
1999	Three Kings	David O. Russell

=== 2000s ===
Year	Film	Director(s)
2000	Gladiator ‡	Ridley Scott
2000	Almost Famous	Cameron Crowe
2000	Billy Elliot	Stephen Daldry
2000	Cast Away	Robert Zemeckis
2000	Crouching Tiger, Hidden Dragon	Ang Lee
2000	Erin Brockovich	Steven Soderbergh
2000	Quills	Philip Kaufman
2000	Thirteen Days	Roger Donaldson
2000	Traffic	Steven Soderbergh
2000	Wonder Boys	Curtis Hanson
2000	You Can Count on Me	Kenneth Lonergan
2001	A Beautiful Mind ‡	Ron Howard
2001	Ali	Michael Mann
2001	In the Bedroom	Todd Field
2001	The Lord of the Rings: The Fellowship of the Ring	Peter Jackson
2001	The Man Who Wasn't There	Joel Coen
2001	Memento	Christopher Nolan
2001	Moulin Rouge!	Baz Luhrmann
2001	Mulholland Drive	David Lynch
2001	The Shipping News	Lasse Hallström
2001	Shrek	Andrew Adamson and Vicky Jenson
2002	Chicago ‡	Rob Marshall
2002	About Schmidt	Alexander Payne
2002	Adaptation.	Spike Jonze
2002	Catch Me If You Can	Steven Spielberg
2002	Far from Heaven	Todd Haynes
2002	Gangs of New York	Martin Scorsese
2002	The Hours	Stephen Daldry
2002	The Lord of the Rings: The Two Towers	Peter Jackson
2002	The Pianist	Roman Polanski
2002	Road to Perdition	Sam Mendes
2003	The Lord of the Rings: The Return of the King ‡	Peter Jackson
2003	Big Fish	Tim Burton
2003	Cold Mountain	Anthony Minghella
2003	Finding Nemo	Andrew Stanton
2003	In America	Jim Sheridan
2003	The Last Samurai	Edward Zwick
2003	Lost in Translation	Sofia Coppola
2003	Master and Commander: The Far Side of the World	Peter Weir
2003	Mystic River	Clint Eastwood
2003	Seabiscuit	Gary Ross
2004	Sideways	Alexander Payne
2004	The Aviator	Martin Scorsese
2004	Collateral	Michael Mann
2004	Eternal Sunshine of the Spotless Mind	Michel Gondry
2004	Finding Neverland	Marc Forster
2004	Hotel Rwanda	Terry George
2004	Kinsey	Bill Condon
2004	Million Dollar Baby ‡	Clint Eastwood
2004	The Phantom of the Opera	Joel Schumacher
2004	Ray	Taylor Hackford
2005	Brokeback Mountain	Ang Lee
2005	Capote	Bennett Miller
2005	Cinderella Man	Ron Howard
2005	The Constant Gardener	Fernando Meirelles
2005	Crash ‡	Paul Haggis
2005	Good Night, and Good Luck.	George Clooney
2005	King Kong	Peter Jackson
2005	Memoirs of a Geisha	Rob Marshall
2005	Munich	Steven Spielberg
2005	Walk the Line	James Mangold
2006	The Departed ‡	Martin Scorsese
2006	Babel	Alejandro González Iñárritu
2006	Blood Diamond	Edward Zwick
2006	Dreamgirls	Bill Condon
2006	Letters from Iwo Jima	Clint Eastwood
2006	Little Children	Todd Field
2006	Little Miss Sunshine	Jonathan Dayton and Valerie Faris
2006	Notes on a Scandal	Richard Eyre
2006	The Queen	Stephen Frears
2006	United 93	Paul Greengrass
2007	No Country for Old Men ‡	Joel Coen and Ethan Coen
2007	American Gangster	Ridley Scott
2007	Atonement	Joe Wright
2007	The Diving Bell and the Butterfly	Julian Schnabel
2007	Into the Wild	Sean Penn
2007	Juno	Jason Reitman
2007	The Kite Runner	Marc Forster
2007	Michael Clayton	Tony Gilroy
2007	Sweeney Todd: The Demon Barber of Fleet Street	Tim Burton
2007	There Will Be Blood	Paul Thomas Anderson
2008	Slumdog Millionaire ‡	Danny Boyle
2008	Changeling	Clint Eastwood
2008	The Curious Case of Benjamin Button	David Fincher
2008	The Dark Knight	Christopher Nolan
2008	Doubt	John Patrick Shanley
2008	Frost/Nixon	Ron Howard
2008	Milk	Gus Van Sant
2008	The Reader	Stephen Daldry
2008	WALL-E	Andrew Stanton
2008	The Wrestler	Darren Aronofsky
2009	The Hurt Locker ‡	Kathryn Bigelow
2009	Avatar	James Cameron
2009	An Education	Lone Scherfig
2009	Inglourious Basterds	Quentin Tarantino
2009	Invictus	Clint Eastwood
2009	Nine	Rob Marshall
2009	Precious	Lee Daniels
2009	A Serious Man	Joel Coen and Ethan Coen
2009	Up	Pete Docter
2009	Up in the Air	Jason Reitman

=== 2010s ===
Year	Film	Director(s)
2010	The Social Network	David Fincher
2010	127 Hours	Danny Boyle
2010	Black Swan	Darren Aronofsky
2010	The Fighter	David O. Russell
2010	Inception	Christopher Nolan
2010	The King's Speech ‡	Tom Hooper
2010	The Town	Ben Affleck
2010	Toy Story 3	Lee Unkrich
2010	True Grit	Joel Coen and Ethan Coen
2010	Winter's Bone	Debra Granik
2011	The Artist ‡	Michel Hazanavicius
2011	The Descendants	Alexander Payne
2011	Drive	Nicolas Winding Refn
2011	Extremely Loud & Incredibly Close	Stephen Daldry
2011	The Help	Tate Taylor
2011	Hugo	Martin Scorsese
2011	Midnight in Paris	Woody Allen
2011	Moneyball	Bennett Miller
2011	The Tree of Life	Terrence Malick
2011	War Horse	Steven Spielberg
2012	Argo ‡	Ben Affleck
2012	Beasts of the Southern Wild	Benh Zeitlin
2012	Django Unchained	Quentin Tarantino
2012	Les Misérables	Tom Hooper
2012	Life of Pi	Ang Lee
2012	Lincoln	Steven Spielberg
2012	The Master	Paul Thomas Anderson
2012	Moonrise Kingdom	Wes Anderson
2012	Silver Linings Playbook	David O. Russell
2012	Zero Dark Thirty	Kathryn Bigelow
2013	12 Years a Slave ‡	Steve McQueen
2013	American Hustle	David O. Russell
2013	Captain Phillips	Paul Greengrass
2013	Dallas Buyers Club	Jean-Marc Vallée
2013	Gravity	Alfonso Cuarón
2013	Her	Spike Jonze
2013	Inside Llewyn Davis	Joel Coen and Ethan Coen
2013	Nebraska	Alexander Payne
2013	Saving Mr. Banks	John Lee Hancock
2013	The Wolf of Wall Street	Martin Scorsese
2014	Boyhood	Richard Linklater
2014	Birdman ‡	Alejandro G. Iñárritu
2014	Gone Girl	David Fincher
2014	The Grand Budapest Hotel	Wes Anderson
2014	The Imitation Game	Morten Tyldum
2014	Nightcrawler	Dan Gilroy
2014	Selma	Ava DuVernay
2014	The Theory of Everything	James Marsh
2014	Unbroken	Angelina Jolie
2014	Whiplash	Damien Chazelle
2015	Spotlight ‡	Tom McCarthy
2015	The Big Short	Adam McKay
2015	Bridge of Spies	Steve Spielberg
2015	Brooklyn	John Crowley
2015	Carol	Todd Haynes
2015	Mad Max: Fury Road	George Miller
2015	The Martian	Ridley Scott
2015	The Revenant	Alejandro G. Iñárritu
2015	Room	Lenny Abrahamson
2015	Sicario	Denis Villeneuve
2015	Star Wars: The Force Awakens	J. J. Abrams
2016	La La Land	Damien Chazelle
2016	Arrival	Denis Villeneuve
2016	Fences	Denzel Washington
2016	Hacksaw Ridge	Mel Gibson
2016	Hell or High Water	David Mackenzie
2016	Lion	Garth Davis
2016	Loving	Jeff Nichols
2016	Manchester by the Sea	Kenneth Lonergan
2016	Moonlight ‡	Barry Jenkins
2016	Sully	Clint Eastwood
2017	The Shape of Water ‡	Guillermo del Toro
2017	The Big Sick	Michael Showalter
2017	Call Me by Your Name	Luca Guadagnino
2017	Darkest Hour	Joe Wright
2017	Dunkirk	Christopher Nolan
2017	The Florida Project	Sean Baker
2017	Get Out	Jordan Peele
2017	Lady Bird	Greta Gerwig
2017	The Post	Steven Spielberg
2017	Three Billboards Outside Ebbing, Missouri	Martin McDonagh
2018	Roma	Alfonso Cuarón
2018	BlacKkKlansman	Spike Lee
2018	Black Panther	Ryan Coogler
2018	The Favourite	Yorgos Lanthimos
2018	First Man	Damien Chazelle
2018	Green Book ‡	Peter Farrelly
2018	If Beale Street Could Talk	Barry Jenkins
2018	Mary Poppins Returns	Rob Marshall
2018	A Star Is Born	Bradley Cooper
2018	Vice	Adam McKay
2019	Once Upon a Time in Hollywood	Quentin Tarantino
2019	1917	Sam Mendes
2019	Ford v Ferrari	James Mangold
2019	The Irishman	Martin Scorsese
2019	Jojo Rabbit	Taika Waititi
2019	Joker	Todd Phillips
2019	Little Women	Greta Gerwig
2019	Marriage Story	Noah Baumbach
2019	Parasite ‡	Bong Joon-ho
2019	Uncut Gems	Josh Safdie and Benny Safdie

=== 2020s ===
Year	Film	Director(s)
2020	Nomadland ‡	Chloé Zhao
2020	Da 5 Bloods	Spike Lee
2020	Ma Rainey's Black Bottom	George C. Wolfe
2020	Mank	David Fincher
2020	Minari	Lee Isaac Chung
2020	News of the World	Paul Greengrass
2020	One Night in Miami...	Regina King
2020	Promising Young Woman	Emerald Fennell
2020	Sound of Metal	Darius Marder
2020	The Trial of the Chicago 7	Aaron Sorkin
2021	The Power of the Dog	Jane Campion
2021	Belfast	Kenneth Branagh
2021	CODA ‡	Sian Heder
2021	Don't Look Up	Adam McKay
2021	Dune	Denis Villeneuve
2021	King Richard	Reinaldo Marcus Green
2021	Licorice Pizza	Paul Thomas Anderson
2021	Nightmare Alley	Guillermo del Toro
2021	tick, tick... BOOM!	Lin-Manuel Miranda
2021	West Side Story	Steven Spielberg
2022	Everything Everywhere All at Once ‡	Daniel Kwan and Daniel Scheinert
2022	Avatar: The Way of Water	James Cameron
2022	Babylon	Damien Chazelle
2022	The Banshees of Inisherin	Martin McDonagh
2022	Elvis	Baz Luhrmann
2022	The Fabelmans	Steven Spielberg
2022	Glass Onion: A Knives Out Mystery	Rian Johnson
2022	RRR	S. S. Rajamouli
2022	Tár	Todd Field
2022	Top Gun: Maverick	Joseph Kosinski
2022	Women Talking	Sarah Polley
2023	Oppenheimer‡	Christopher Nolan
2023	American Fiction	Cord Jefferson
2023	Barbie	Greta Gerwig
2023	The Color Purple	Blitz Bazawule
2023	The Holdovers	Alexander Payne
2023	Killers of the Flower Moon	Martin Scorsese
2023	Maestro	Bradley Cooper
2023	Past Lives	Celine Song
2023	Poor Things	Yorgos Lanthimos
2023	Saltburn	Emerald Fennell
2024	Anora‡	Sean Baker
2024	A Complete Unknown	James Mangold
2024	The Brutalist	Brady Corbet
2024	Conclave	Edward Berger
2024	Dune: Part Two	Denis Villeneuve
2024	Emilia Pérez	Jacques Audiard
2024	Nickel Boys	RaMell Ross
2024	Sing Sing	Greg Kwedar
2024	The Substance	Coralie Fargeat
2024	Wicked	Jon M. Chu
2025	One Battle After Another‡	Paul Thomas Anderson
2025	Bugonia	Yorgos Lanthimos
2025	Frankenstein	Guillermo del Toro
2025	Hamnet	Chloe Zhao
2025	Jay Kelly	Noah Baumbach
2025	Marty Supreme	Josh Safdie
2025	Sentimental Value	Joachim Trier
2025	Sinners	Ryan Coogler
2025	Train Dreams	Clint Bentley
2025	Wicked: For Good	Jon M. Chu

Table key
‡	Also won the Academy Award for Best Picture

== Records ==
- First Best Picture winner
  - Sense and Sensibility (1995)
- Films that won Best Picture at the Critics' Choice Awards and Best Picture at the Academy Awards
  - American Beauty (1999)
  - Gladiator (2000)
  - A Beautiful Mind (2001)
  - Chicago (2002)
  - The Lord of the Rings: The Return of the King (2003)
  - The Departed (2006)
  - No Country for Old Men (2007)
  - Slumdog Millionaire (2008)
  - The Hurt Locker (2009)
  - The Artist (2011)
  - Argo (2012)
  - 12 Years a Slave (2013)
  - Spotlight (2015)
  - The Shape of Water (2017)
  - Nomadland (2020)
  - Everything Everywhere All at Once (2022)
  - Oppenheimer (2023)
  - Anora (2024)
  - One Battle After Another (2025)
- First non-English language film to be nominated for Best Picture
  - Life is Beautiful (1997), in Italian
- First non-English language film to win Best Picture
  - Roma (2018), in Mixtec and Spanish
- First film by genre to win Best Picture
  - Period, Drama: Sense and Sensibility (1995)
  - Comedy, Crime: Fargo (1996)
  - Neo-noir, Thriller: L.A. Confidential (1997)
  - War, Epic: Saving Private Ryan (1998)
  - Adventure: Gladiator (2000)
  - Biopic: A Beautiful Mind (2001)
  - Musical: Chicago (2002)
  - Fantasy: The Lord of the Rings: The Return of the King (2003)
  - Western, Romance: Brokeback Mountain (2005)
  - Silent: The Artist (2011)
  - Historical: Argo (2012)
  - Coming-of-age: Boyhood (2014)
  - Independent, Martial arts, Science-fiction: Everything Everywhere All at Once (2022)
  - Screwball: Anora (2024)
  - Action: One Battle After Another (2025)
- First horror film to be nominated for Best Picture
  - Black Swan (2010)
- First superhero film to be nominated for Best Picture
  - The Dark Knight (2008)
- First animated film to be nominated for Best Picture
  - Shrek (2001)
- First 3-D film to be nominated for Best Picture
  - Avatar and Up (2009)
- First streaming service film to be nominated for Best Picture
  - Manchester by the Sea (2016), distributed by Amazon Studios
- First streaming service film to win Best Picture
  - Roma (2018), distributed by Netflix
- Film franchises with multiple Best Picture nominations
  - The Middle-earth franchise with 3 nominations for The Lord of the Rings: The Fellowship of the Ring, The Lord of the Rings: The Two Towers, and The Lord of the Rings: The Return of the King
  - Avatar franchise with 2 nominations for Avatar and Avatar: The Way of Water
  - Dune franchise with 2 nominations for Dune and Dune: Part Two
  - Wicked franchise with 2 nominations for Wicked and Wicked: For Good
- Highest-grossing film to win Best Picture
  - The Lord of the Rings: The Return of the King with $1,147,997,407
- Highest-grossing film to be nominated for Best Picture
  - Avatar with $2,923,710,708
- Lowest-grossing film to be nominated for Best Picture
  - Mank with $100,072
- Lowest-grossing film to win Best Picture
  - The Power of the Dog with $417,022
- All non-English language films to be nominated for Best Picture

Year	Film title used in nomination	Original title	Director	Award recipient(s)	Country of production	Language(s)
1997 (4th)	Life Is Beautiful	La vita è bella	Roberto Benigni	Elda Ferri; Gianluigi Braschi	Italy	Italian (some parts in German & English)
2000 (6th)	Crouching Tiger, Hidden Dragon	Wòhǔ Cánglóng (pinyin) 臥虎藏龍 (traditional Chinese) 卧虎藏龙 (simplified Chinese)	Ang Lee	Bill Kong; Hsu Li-kong; Ang Lee	Taiwan; China; Hong Kong; United States	Mandarin
2006 (12th)	Letters from Iwo Jima	Letters from Iwo Jima (English); Iô-Jima kara no tegami 硫黄島からの手紙 (Japanese)	Clint Eastwood	Clint Eastwood; Steven Spielberg; Robert Lorenz	United States	Japanese (some parts in English)
2006 (12th)	Babel	Babel	Alejandro González Iñárritu	Alejandro González Iñárritu; Jon Kilik; Steve Golin	United States; Mexico; France	English, Arabic, Spanish, Japanese, Japanese Sign language, Berber languages
2007 (13th)	The Diving Bell and the Butterfly	Le Scaphandre et le Papillon	Julian Schnabel	Kathleen Kennedy; Jon Kilik	France	French
2018 (24th)	Roma	Roma	Alfonso Cuarón	Gabriela Rodríguez; Alfonso Cuarón	Mexico; United States	Spanish, Mixtec
2019 (25th)	Parasite	Gisaengchung 기생충 (Korean)	Bong Joon-ho	Kwak Sin-ae; Bong Joon-ho	South Korea	Korean
2020 (26th)	Minari	Minari (English) 미나리 (Korean)	Lee Isaac Chung	Christina Oh	United States	Korean (some parts in English)
2022 (28th)	RRR		S. S. Rajamouli	D. V. V. Danayya	India	Telugu
2023 (29th)	Past Lives	Past Lives	Celine Song	David Hinojosa; Christine Vachon; Pamela Koffler	United States; South Korea	Korean, English
2024 (30th)	Emilia Pérez	Emilia Pérez	Jacques Audiard	Pascal Caucheteux; Jacques Audiard	France	Spanish
2025 (31st)	Sentimental Value	Affeksjonsverd	Joachim Trier	Maria Ekerhovd; Andrea Berentsen Ottmar	Norway; France; Germany; Denmark; Sweden; United Kingdom	Norwegian, English

- Only animated films to be nominated for Best Picture

Year	Film title	Director(s)	Award recipient(s)	Production Company	Notes
2001 (7th)	Shrek	Andrew Adamson; Vicky Jenson	Jeffrey Katzenberg; Aron Warner; John H. Williams	DreamWorks Animation
2003 (7th)	Finding Nemo	Andrew Stanton	Graham Walters	Pixar Animation Studios
2008 (14th)	WALL-E	Andrew Stanton	Jim Morris	Pixar Animation Studios
2009 (15th)	Up	Pete Docter	Jonas Rivera	Pixar Animation Studios
2010 (16th)	Toy Story 3	Lee Unkrich	Darla K. Anderson	Pixar Animation Studios

- Films to gross over $1 billion to be nominated for Best Picture

Year	Film title	Director(s)	Award recipient(s)	Production Companies
1997 (3rd)	Titanic	James Cameron	James Cameron; Jon Landau	Paramount Pictures; 20th Century Fox
2003 (9th)	The Lord of the Rings: The Return of the King	Peter Jackson	Peter Jackson; Fran Walsh; Barrie M. Osborne	New Line Cinema
2008 (14th)	The Dark Knight	Christopher Nolan	Christopher Nolan; Emma Thomas; Charles Roven	Warner Bros. Pictures
2009 (15th)	Avatar	James Cameron	James Cameron; Jon Landau	20th Century Fox
2010 (16th)	Toy Story 3	Lee Unkrich	Darla K. Anderson	Walt Disney Pictures; Pixar Animation Studios
2015 (21st)	Star Wars: The Force Awakens	J. J. Abrams	J. J. Abrams; Kathleen Kennedy; Bryan Burk	Lucasfilm
2018 (24th)	Black Panther	Ryan Coogler	Kevin Feige	Marvel Studios
2019 (25th)	Joker	Todd Phillips	Todd Phillips; Bradley Cooper; Emma Tillinger Koskoff	Warner Bros. Pictures; Village Roadshow Pictures
2022 (28th)	Top Gun: Maverick	Joseph Kosinski	Jerry Bruckheimer; Tom Cruise; Christopher McQuarrie; David Ellison	Paramount Pictures; Skydance Media
2022 (28th)	Avatar: The Way of Water	James Cameron	James Cameron; Jon Landau	20th Century Studios
2023 (29th)	Barbie	Greta Gerwig	David Heyman; Margot Robbie; Tom Ackerley; Robbie Brenner	Warner Bros. Pictures

- Best Picture winners with the highest prize wins from the "Big Three" (Cannes, Venice, and Berlin)
  - Sense and Sensibility (1995) - Golden Bear
  - Brokeback Mountain (2005) - Golden Lion
  - The Shape of Water (2017) – Golden Lion
  - Roma (2018) - Golden Lion
  - Nomadland (2020) – Golden Lion
  - Anora (2024) – Palme d'Or
- Palme d'Or winning films to be nominated for Best Picture (Best Picture winners designated with ** two asterisks)
  - The Pianist (2002)
  - The Tree of Life (2011)
  - Parasite (2019)
  - Anora (2024) **
- Golden Lion winning films to be nominated for Best Picture (Best Picture winners designated with ** two asterisks)
  - Brokeback Mountain (2005) **
  - The Wrestler (2008)
  - The Shape of Water (2017) **
  - Roma (2018) **
  - Joker (2019)
  - Nomadland (2020) **
  - Poor Things (2023)
- Golden Bear winning films to be nominated for Best Picture (Best Picture winners designated with ** two asterisks)
  - Sense and Sensibility (1995) **
  - The People vs. Larry Flynt (1996)
  - The Thin Red Line (1998)
  - Magnolia (1999)

== Production companies and distributors with multiple nominations and wins ==
Universal Pictures, Warner Bros Pictures, DreamWorks Pictures, and Fox Searchlight Pictures have the most wins with 4, while Universal Pictures has the most nominations with 52.

Production company/distributor	Nominations	Wins
20th Century Fox	20	0
A24	11	1
Amazon MGM Studios	7	0
Amazon Prime Video	2	0
American Zoetrope	2	0
Annapurna Pictures	6	0
Apple Studios	2	0
BBC Films	12	1
Blumhouse	3	0
Castle Rock Entertainment	4	0
CBS Films	2	0
Cinergi Pictures	1	0
Columbia Pictures	18	3
DreamWorks Animation	1	0
DreamWorks	27	4
Focus Features	29	2
Fox Searchlight Pictures	27	4
Film4	11	2
FilmDistrict	1	0
Gracie Films	2	0
Gramercy Pictures	2	1
HBO Pictures	1	0
Hollywood Pictures	2	0
IFC Films	1	1
ImageMovers	1	0
Imagine Entertainment	6	1
Legendary Pictures	7	0
Lightstorm Entertainment	3	0
Lionsgate	10	1
Lucasfilm	1	0
Marvel Studios	1	0
Miramax Films	22	2
Metro-Goldwyn-Mayer	7	0
Mubi	2	0
Mutual Film Company	4	1
Neon	2	1
Netflix	17	2
New Line Cinema	10	1
Orion Pictures	3	0
Open Road Films	2	1
Paramount Pictures	32	3
Pathé	8	1
Pixar Animation Studios	4	0
Plan B Entertainment	12	2
Playtone	2	0
PolyGram Filmed Entertainment	3	1
Regency Enterprises	7	2
Relativity Media	9	1
Roadside Attractions	2	0
Samuel Goldwyn Films	2	0
Skydance Media	2	0
Sony Pictures Classics	7	0
StudioCanal	10	0
Summit Entertainment	8	3
Syncopy	4	1
Touchstone Pictures	6	0
TriStar	3	0
United Artists	4	0
Universal Pictures	52	4
Vertigo Entertainment	1	1
Village Roadshow Pictures	6	0
Walt Disney Pictures	6	0
Warner Bros Pictures	39	4
The Weinstein Company	12	1
Working Title Films	11	1
The Zanuck Company	3	0
