= Life Is Beautiful =

1997 Italian film by Roberto Benigni

- English-language release poster
- Directed by: Roberto Benigni
- Written by: Roberto Benigni; Vincenzo Cerami
- Produced by: Gianluigi Braschi; Elda Ferri
- Starring: Roberto Benigni; Nicoletta Braschi
- Cinematography: Tonino Delli Colli
- Edited by: Simona Paggi
- Music by: Nicola Piovani
- Production company: Melampo Cinematografica
- Distributed by: Cecchi Gori Group (Italy); Miramax Films (International)
- Release date: 20 December 1997 (Italy)
- Running time: 116 minutes
- Country: Italy
- Language: Italian
- Budget: Lit. 15 billion (~ 12.8 million €)
- Box office: $230.1 million

Life Is Beautiful (Italian: La vita è bella, pronounced [la ˈviːta ˌɛ bˈbɛlla]) is a 1997 Italian period comedy-drama film directed by and starring Roberto Benigni, who co-wrote the film with Vincenzo Cerami. Benigni plays Guido Orefice, a Jewish Italian man who first works as a waiter while courting a gentile schoolteacher, and later as a bookshop owner who employs his imagination to shield his son from the horrors of internment in a Nazi concentration camp. The film was partially inspired by the book In the End, I Beat Hitler by Rubino Romeo Salmonì and by Benigni's father, who spent two years in the Bergen-Belsen concentration camp during World War II.

The film was an overwhelming critical and commercial success. Despite some criticisms of using the subject matter for comedic purposes, it received widespread acclaim, with critics praising its story, performances and direction, and the union of drama and comedy. The movie grossed over $230 million worldwide, including $57.6 million in the United States, is the second-highest-grossing foreign-language film in the U.S. (after Crouching Tiger, Hidden Dragon) and one of the highest-grossing non-English-language movies of all time. The National Board of Review included it in the top five best foreign films of 1998.

The movie won the Grand Prix at the 1998 Cannes Film Festival, nine David di Donatello Awards (including Best Film), five Nastro d'Argento Awards in Italy, two European Film Awards, and three Academy Awards, including Best International Feature Film and Best Actor for Benigni, the first for a male non-English-language performance.

== Plot ==
Part I

In 1939, in Fascist Italy, young, comical and sharp Italian Jew Guido Orefice arrives to work in Arezzo, Tuscany, with his uncle Eliseo in a hotel restaurant. He falls in love with Dora, a gentile young woman. Later, Guido sees her again in the city, where she works as a teacher and is set to be engaged to Rodolfo, a rich but arrogant local government official with whom Guido regularly clashes. Guido sets up many "coincidental" incidents to show his interest in Dora.

Eventually, Dora gives in to Guido's affection and promise. Guido steals her from her engagement party on Uncle Eliseo's horse, Robin Hood, humiliating Dora's fiancé and mother. They are later married, have a son, Giosuè, and open a bookstore. Dora's mother visits once, meeting her grandson.

Part II

In 1944, during later World War II, Nazi Germany occupies Northern Italy. Guido, Eliseo, and Giosuè are arrested on Giosuè's birthday. They and many other Italian Jews are forced onto a train bound for a concentration camp. After confronting a guard about her husband and son and being told there was no mistake, Dora insists on boarding the train to stay with her family. However, as men and women are separated in the camp, Dora never sees her family during their internment. Guido pulls off various stunts, such as hijacking the camp's loudspeaker to send messages, symbolic or literal, to Dora to assure her that he and Giosuè are safe. Eliseo is murdered in a gas chamber shortly after their arrival. Giosuè narrowly avoids being gassed himself as he hates to bathe, and did not follow the other children when they had been ordered to "take a shower".

Guido consistently hides the true situation from Giosuè. He convinces him that the camp is a complicated game in which he must perform the tasks given to him. Each task earns them points, and whoever reaches one thousand points first wins a tank. He is told that if he cries, complains for his mother, or says that he is hungry, he will lose points, while quiet boys who hide from the guards earn extra points. Giosuè is at times reluctant to go along with the game, but Guido continually encourages him.

One day, Guido takes advantage of the appearance of visiting German officers and their families to show Giosuè that other children are hiding as part of the game. He tricks a German nanny into thinking Giosuè is one of her charges to feed him while Guido serves the German officers. Giosuè must stay quiet at all times for this part of the game and simply follow the other children, as he cannot speak German. Giosuè is almost exposed as a prisoner when he accidentally thanks a server in Italian at dinner. However, when the server returns with his superior, Guido provides a ruse by teaching all of the German children how to give thanks in Italian.

Guido maintains the game narrative through the end when, in the chaos of shutting down the camp as the Allied forces approach, he tells his son to stay hidden until everybody has left, the final task before the promised tank is his. He goes to find Dora but is caught by a German soldier, and an officer orders his execution. As he is led to his execution, Guido passes by Giosuè one last time and winks, still in character and playing the game. Guido is then shot dead in an alleyway.

The next morning, Giosuè emerges from hiding, just as a U.S. Army unit led by a Sherman tank arrives and the camp is liberated. An overjoyed Giosuè, unaware of his father's death, believes he won the tank, and an American soldier allows him to ride with him on it. Giosuè soon spots Dora in the procession leaving the camp and reunites with her. While the young Giosuè excitedly tells his mother about how he had won a tank, just as his father had promised, the film's narrator reveals himself as the adult Giosuè, reminiscing on the sacrifices his father made for him.

== Cast ==
- Roberto Benigni as Guido Orefice, an Italian-Jewish waiter, later owner of a bookstore and Giosuè's father
- Nicoletta Braschi as Dora, a gentile school teacher, Guido's wife, and Giosuè's mother
- Giorgio Cantarini as Giosuè Orefice, Guido and Dora's son
- Giustino Durano as Uncle Eliseo, an Italian-Jewish maître, Giosuè's granduncle and Guido's uncle
- Horst Buchholz as Doctor Lessing, a German regular customer at Eliseo's restaurant who often tries to solve riddles when with Guido, later a doctor at the concentration camp
- Marisa Paredes (dubbed by Paila Pavese) as Dora's mother, a rich socialite
- Sergio Bustric as Ferruccio, Guido's friend and bumbling partner
- Amerigo Fontani as Rodolfo, Dora's first fiancé and a government official
- Lydia Alfonsi as Guicciardini
- Giuliana Lojodice as the Headmistress
- Pietro Desilva as Bartolomeo
- Francesco Guzzo as Vittorino
- Raffaella Lebboroni as Elena
- Claudio Alfonsi as Rodolfo's friend
- Richard Sammel as a Waffen-SS Officer whose German speech Guido purposely mistranslates as part of his narrative
- Aaron Craig as an American Tank Driver
- Omero Antonutti as older Giosuè who serves as the narrator (voice, uncredited'
- Marc Schwarz as the voice of another American Tank Driver (voice, uncredited)

== Production ==
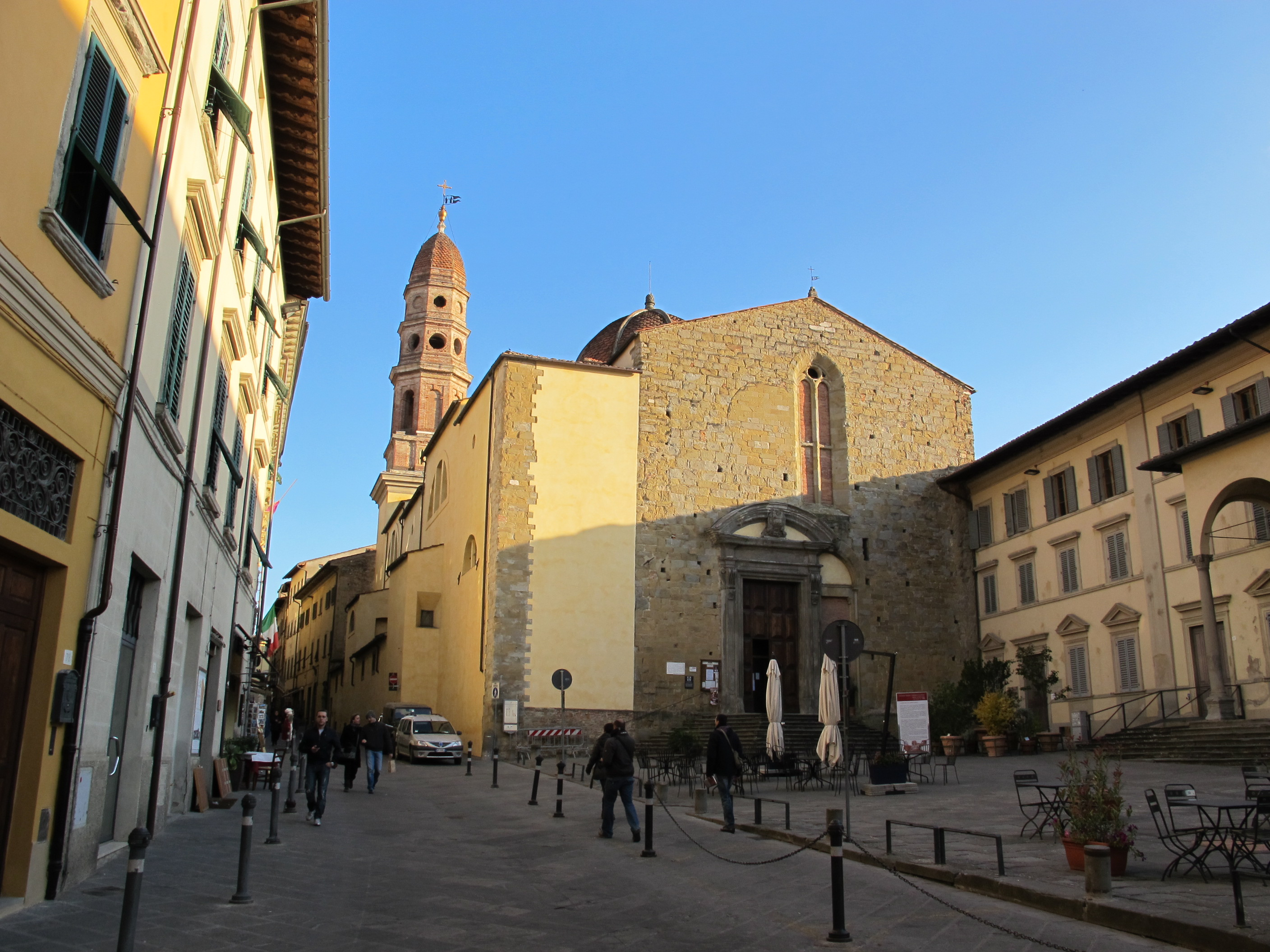
The film was shot in Arezzo, Tuscany, including by the Badia delle Sante Flora e Lucilla.

Director Roberto Benigni, who wrote the screenplay with Vincenzo Cerami, was inspired by the story of Rubino Romeo Salmonì and his book In the End, I Beat Hitler, which incorporates elements of irony and black comedy. Salmoni was an Italian Jew who was deported to Auschwitz, survived and was reunited with his parents, but found his brothers were murdered. Benigni stated he wished to commemorate Salmoni as a man who wished to live in the right way. He also based the story on that of his father Luigi Benigni, who was a member of the Italian Army after Italy became a co-belligerent of the Allies in 1943. Luigi Benigni spent two years in a Nazi labour camp, and to avoid scaring his children, told about his experiences humorously, finding this helped him cope. Roberto Benigni explained his philosophy, "to laugh and to cry comes from the same point of the soul, no? I'm a storyteller: the crux of the matter is to reach beauty, poetry, it doesn't matter if that is comedy or tragedy. They're the same if you reach the beauty." The names of the protagonists are instead taken from Dora De Giovanni and Guido Vittoriano Basile, uncles of Nicoletta Braschi. Dora's life was turned upside down when Guido, arrested for his anti-fascist activity, died in the Mauthausen concentration camp, a fate similar to that of the film's protagonist.

Benigni's friends advised against making the film, as he is a comedian and not Jewish, and the Holocaust was not of interest to his established audience. Because he is Gentile, Benigni consulted with the Center for Documentation of Contemporary Judaism, based in Milan, throughout production. Benigni incorporated historical inaccuracies in order to distinguish his story from the true Holocaust, about which he said only documentaries interviewing survivors could provide "the truth".

The film was shot in the centro storico (historic centre) of Arezzo, Tuscany. The scene where Benigni falls off a bicycle and lands on Nicoletta Braschi was shot in front of Badia delle Sante Flora e Lucilla in Arezzo. The concentration camp was set in an old abandoned factory near Papigno (Terni) that was converted into a concentration camp for filming.

=== Music ===
The original score to the film was composed by Nicola Piovani, with the exception of a classical piece which figures prominently: the barcarolle "Belle nuit, ô nuit d'amour" by Jacques Offenbach. The soundtrack album won the Academy Award for Best Original Dramatic Score and was nominated for a Grammy Award for Best Instrumental Composition Written for a Motion Picture, Television or Other Visual Media.

== Release ==
In Italy, the film was released in 1997 by Cecchi Gori Distribuzione. The film was screened in the Cannes Film Festival in May 1998, where it was a late addition to the selection of films. In the United States, it was released on 23 October 1998, by Miramax Films with English subtitles. In Germany, it was released on 12 November 1998. In Austria, it was released on 13 November 1998. In the United Kingdom, it was released on 12 February 1999. After the English-subtitled version became a hit in English speaking territories, Miramax Films reissued Life Is Beautiful in an English-dubbed version, but it was less successful than the subtitled Italian version.

The film was aired on the Italian television station RAI on 22 October 2001 and was viewed by 16 million people. This made it the most watched Italian film on Italian television.

== Reception ==
=== Box office ===
Life Is Beautiful was commercially successful, making 92 billion lire ($48.7 million) in Italy. It was the highest-grossing Italian film in its native country until 2011, when surpassed by Checco Zalone's What a Beautiful Day.

The film was also successful in the rest of the world, grossing $57.6 million in the United States and Canada and $123.8 million in other territories, for a worldwide gross of $230.1 million. It surpassed fellow Italian film Il Postino: The Postman as the highest-grossing foreign-language film in the United States until Crouching Tiger, Hidden Dragon (2000).

=== Critical response ===
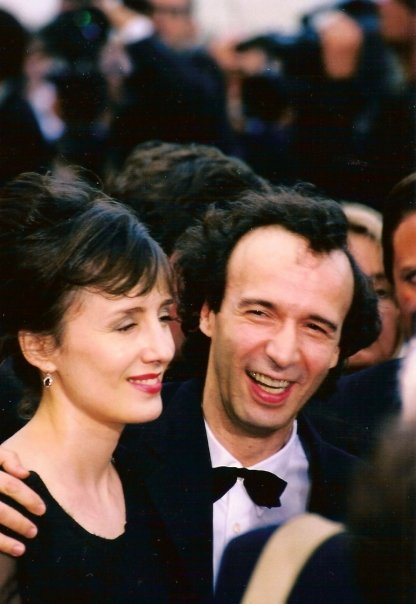
Roberto Benigni received positive reviews for his film and performance, which he starred in with his wife Nicoletta Braschi.

The film was praised by the Italian press, with Benigni treated as a "national hero." Pope John Paul II, who received a private screening with Benigni, placed it in his top five favourite films. It holds a "Fresh" 81% approval rating on review aggregation website Rotten Tomatoes, based on 94 reviews with an average rating of 7.5/10. The site's consensus reads: "Benigni's earnest charm, when not overstepping its bounds into the unnecessarily treacly, offers the possibility of hope in the face of unflinching horror". Metacritic assigned the film a weighted average score of 58 out of 100, based on 32 critics, indicating "mixed or average reviews".

Roger Ebert gave the film 3.5/4 stars, stating: "[According to Benigni] the movie has stirred up venomous opposition from the right wing in Italy [and at] Cannes, it offended some left-wing critics with its use of humor in connection with the Holocaust. What may be most offensive to both wings is its sidestepping of politics in favor of simple human ingenuity. The film finds the right notes to negotiate its delicate subject matter ... The movie actually softens the Holocaust slightly, to make the humor possible at all. In the real death camps there would be no role for Guido. But Life Is Beautiful is not about Nazis and Fascists, but about the human spirit. It is about rescuing whatever is good and hopeful from the wreckage of dreams. About hope for the future. About the necessary human conviction, or delusion, that things will be better for our children than they are right now." Michael Wilmington of the Chicago Tribune gave the movie a score of 100/100, calling it: "A deeply moving blend of cold terror and rapturous hilarity. Lovingly crafted by Italy's top comedian and most popular filmmaker, it's that rare comedy that takes on a daring and ambitious subject and proves worthy of it."

Richard Schickel, writing for Time, argued, "There are references to mass extermination, but that brutal reality is never vividly presented". He concluded that "even a hint of the truth about the Holocaust would crush [Benigni]'s comedy." Owen Gleiberman of Entertainment Weekly gave it a B−, calling it "undeniably some sort of feat—the first feel-good Holocaust weepie. It's been a long time coming." However, Glieberman stated: "There's only one problem. As shot, it looks like a game". Michael O'Sullivan, writing for The Washington Post, called it "sad, funny and haunting."

Nell Minow of Common Sense Media gave it 5/5 stars, saying: "This magnificent film gives us a glimpse of the Holocaust, but it is really about love, and the indomitability of humanity even in the midst of inhumanity." Janet Maslin wrote in The New York Times that the film took "a colossal amount of gall" but "because Mr. Benigni can be heart-rending without a trace of the maudlin, it works." Los Angeles Times's Kenneth Turan noted the film had "some furious opposition" at Cannes, but said "what is surprising about this unlikely film is that it succeeds as well as it does. Its sentiment is inescapable, but genuine poignancy and pathos are also present, and an overarching sincerity is visible too."

David Rooney of Variety said the film had "mixed results," with "surprising depth and poignancy" in Benigni's performance but "visually rather flat" camera work by Tonino Delli Colli. In 2002, BBC critic Tom Dawson wrote "the film is presumably intended as a tribute to the powers of imagination, innocence, and love in the most harrowing of circumstances," but "Benigni's sentimental fantasy diminishes the suffering of Holocaust victims."

In 2006, Jewish American comedic filmmaker Mel Brooks spoke negatively of the film in Der Spiegel, saying it trivialized the suffering in concentration camps. By contrast, Nobel Laureate Imre Kertész argued that those who take the film to be a comedy, rather than a tragedy, have missed the point of the film. He draws attention to what he terms 'Holocaust conformism' in cinema to rebuff detractors of Life Is Beautiful.

Israeli screenwriter, author and art critic Ḳobi Niv published the book Life Is Beautiful, but Not for Jews (in 2000 in Hebrew and an English translation in 2003), in which he analyzed the movie from a highly critical perspective, suggesting that the film's underlining narrative is harmful for Jews.

Another academic analysis of the movie was undertaken by Ilona Klein, who analyzes the film's success and refers to the "ambiguous themes hidden within." Klein suggests that one of the reasons the movie was so successful was its appeal of "sentimental optimism". At the same time, she points out that "Miramax's hype billed this film as a fable about 'love, family, and the power of imagination,' yet most Jewish victims of the Nazis' 'Final Solution' were loving, concerned, devoted parents. No amount of love, family, and power of imagination helped their children survive the gas chambers."

David Sterritt of The Christian Science Monitor highlighted that "Enthusiasm for the movie has not been as unanimous as its ad campaign suggests, however, and audiences would do well to ponder its implicit attitudes." He pointed out that the movie implicitly suggests quick-witted confidence was a match for the terrors of fascist death camps, then added that "[Benigni's] fable ultimately obscures the human and historical events it sets out to illuminate."

The movie received some criticism for the scene of the U.S. Army Sherman M4 tank coming to liberate the concentration camp, although Auschwitz was liberated by the Red Army; however, as stated by Benigni, the camp of the movie is not Auschwitz: "... Around the camp there are mountains, which in Auschwitz there are not. That is "the" concentration camp, because any camp contains the horror of Auschwitz, not one or another".

=== Accolades ===
Life Is Beautiful was shown at the 1998 Cannes Film Festival, and went on to win the Grand Prix. Upon receiving the award, Benigni kissed the feet of jury president Martin Scorsese.

At the 71st Academy Awards, Benigni won Best Actor for his role, with the film winning two more awards for Best Music, Original Dramatic Score and Best Foreign Language Film. Benigni jumped on top of the seats as he made his way to the stage to accept his first award, and upon accepting his second, said, "This is a terrible mistake because I used up all my English!"

Award	Date of ceremony	Category	Recipient(s)	Result	Ref(s)
Academy Awards	21 March 1999	Best Picture	Elda Ferri and Gianluigi Braschi	Nominated	
Academy Awards	21 March 1999	Best Director	Roberto Benigni	Nominated	
Academy Awards	21 March 1999	Best Actor	Roberto Benigni	Won	
Academy Awards	21 March 1999	Best Original Screenplay	Roberto Benigni and Vincenzo Cerami	Nominated	
Academy Awards	21 March 1999	Best Foreign Language Film	Italy	Won	
Academy Awards	21 March 1999	Best Film Editing	Simona Paggi	Nominated	
Academy Awards	21 March 1999	Best Music, Original Dramatic Score	Nicola Piovani	Won	
Australian Film Institute Awards	1999	Best Foreign Film	Roberto Benigni, Elda Ferri and Gianluigi Braschi	Won	
BAFTA Awards	11 April 1999	Best Film Not in the English Language	Roberto Benigni, Elda Ferri and Gianluigi Braschi	Nominated	
BAFTA Awards	11 April 1999	Best Film Original Screenplay Writing	Roberto Benigni and Vincenzo Cerami	Nominated	
BAFTA Awards	11 April 1999	Best Film Actor in a Leading Role	Roberto Benigni	Won	
Cannes Film Festival	13–24 May 1998	Grand Prize	Roberto Benigni	Won	
César Awards	6 March 1999	Best Foreign Film	Roberto Benigni	Won	
Critics' Choice Awards	19 January 1999	Best Movie		Nominated	
Critics' Choice Awards	19 January 1999	Best Movie in a Foreign Language	Roberto Benigni	Won	
David di Donatello Awards	1998	Best Film	Roberto Benigni	Won	
David di Donatello Awards	1998	Best Director	Roberto Benigni	Won	
David di Donatello Awards	1998	Best Producer	Elda Ferri and Gianluigi Braschi	Won	
David di Donatello Awards	1998	Best Script	Roberto Benigni and Vincenzo Cerami	Won	
David di Donatello Awards	1998	Best Actor in a Leading Role	Roberto Benigni	Won	
David di Donatello Awards	1998	Best Actor in a Supporting Role	Sergio Bustric	Nominated	
David di Donatello Awards	1998	Best Cinematography	Tonino Delli Colli	Won	
David di Donatello Awards	1998	Best Editing	Simona Paggi	Nominated	
David di Donatello Awards	1998	Best Sound	Tullio Morganti	Nominated	
David di Donatello Awards	1998	Best Score	Nicola Piovani	Nominated	
David di Donatello Awards	1998	Best Production Design	Danilo Donati	Won	
David di Donatello Awards	1998	Best Costumes	Danilo Donati	Won	
David di Donatello Awards	1998	Scholars Jury David	Roberto Benigni	Won	
European Film Awards	7 December 1998	Best Film	Elda Ferri and Gianluigi Braschi	Won	
European Film Awards	7 December 1998	Best Leading Actor	Roberto Benigni	Won	
Jerusalem Film Festival	1998	Best Jewish Experience		Won	
Screen Actors Guild Awards	7 March 1999	Outstanding Performance by an Ensemble in a Motion Picture	Cast	Nominated	
Screen Actors Guild Awards	7 March 1999	Outstanding Performance by a Male Actor in a Leading Role in a Motion Picture	Roberto Benigni	Won	
Toronto International Film Festival	10–19 September 1998	People's Choice Award	Roberto Benigni	Won	

== See also ==
- List of submissions to the 71st Academy Awards for Best Foreign Language Film
- List of Italian submissions for the Academy Award for Best International Feature Film
- The Day the Clown Cried
