= Rubino Romeo Salmonì =

Italian author (1920–2011)

- Born: 22 January 1920; Rome, Italy
- Died: 10 July 2011 (aged 91); Rome, Italy
- Occupation: Writer

Rubino Romeo Salmonì (22 January 1920 – 10 July 2011) was an Italian author known for his book In the End, I Beat Hitler, based on his experiences as a survivor of Auschwitz II–Birkenau during the Holocaust.

== Biography ==
An Italian Jew, Salmonì was born in Rome in 1920. He escaped the first mass arrests of Jews from the Roman Ghetto in October 1943, but was arrested by the Italian police in April 1944.

After being imprisoned in Rome, he was moved to a camp in Fossoli and arrived at Auschwitz when he was 24. He was given the identification number A15810, and forced to work, facing starvation and cold. Salmonì and other prisoners in the camp were freed by the Red Army in 1945. While Salmonì was reunited with his parents, he found his brothers were murdered.

=== In the End, I Beat Hitler ===
After the war, Salmonì visited many schools and colleges to share his experiences. His book In the End, I Beat Hitler also recounts his experiences, incorporating elements of irony and black humour. He wrote, "I came out of Auschwitz alive, I have a wonderful family, I celebrated my golden wedding anniversary, I have 12 splendid grandchildren – I think I can say I ruined Hitler's plan for me."

The writings served as an inspiration for Italian director Roberto Benigni's 1997 film Life Is Beautiful, which won the Cannes Grand Prix and the Academy Award for Best Foreign Language Film. Benigni stated he wished to commemorate Salmonì as a man who wished to live in the right way. Also in 1997, Salmonì appeared in the documentary film Memoria.

The book was presented at Palazzo Valentini in January 2011 by Salmonì, Province of Rome President Nicola Zingaretti and chief rabbi Riccardo Di Segni.

=== Death ===
Salmonì died in Rome on 10 July 2011, with Mayor of Rome Gianni Alemanno calling him "a great man who with his courage and determination managed to save himself from the hell of Auschwitz-Birkenau," and the Central Council of Jews in Germany saying Salmonì's death was a "great loss." President of Italy Giorgio Napolitano and President of Lazio Renata Polverini also expressed their sadness at the news.
