= Elizabeth (film) =

1998 film by Shekhar Kapurr

- Theatrical release poster
- Directed by: Shekhar Kapur
- Written by: Michael Hirst
- Produced by: Tim Bevan; Eric Fellner; Alison Owen
- Starring: Cate Blanchett; Geoffrey Rush; Christopher Eccleston; Joseph Fiennes; John Gielgud; Richard Attenborough
- Cinematography: Remi Adefarasin
- Edited by: Jill Bilcock
- Music by: David Hirschfelder
- Production companies: Kapurfilm; Working Title Films; Channel Four Films; ProsonFilm
- Distributed by: PolyGram Filmed Entertainment
- Release dates: 8 September 1998 (Venice); 23 October 1998 (United Kingdom)
- Running time: 123 minutes
- Country: United Kingdom
- Language: English
- Budget: $30 million
- Box office: $82 million

Elizabeth is a 1998 British biographical historical drama film directed by Shekhar Kapur and written by Michael Hirst. It stars Cate Blanchett as Elizabeth I of England, with Geoffrey Rush, Christopher Eccleston, Joseph Fiennes, John Gielgud, and Richard Attenborough in supporting roles. The film is based on the early years of Elizabeth's reign, when she is elevated to the throne after the death of her half-sister Mary I, who had imprisoned her. As she establishes herself on the throne, she faces plots and threats to take her down.

Elizabeth premiered at the 55th Venice International Film Festival on 8 September 1998 and was theatrically released by PolyGram Filmed Entertainment in the United Kingdom on 23 October. The film became a critical and commercial success. Reviewers praised Kapur's direction, costume design, production values and most notably Blanchett's titular performance, bringing her to international recognition, while the film grossed $82 million against its $30 million budget.

The film received three nominations at the 56th Golden Globe Awards, including for the Best Motion Picture – Drama, with Blanchett winning Best Actress. It received twelve nominations at the 52nd British Academy Film Awards, winning five awards, including Outstanding British Film, and Best Actress (for Blanchett). At the 71st Academy Awards, it received seven nominations, including for Best Picture and Best Actress (for Blanchett), winning Best Makeup. In 2007, Blanchett and Rush reprised their roles in Kapur's sequel Elizabeth: The Golden Age, which covers the later part of Elizabeth's reign.

== Plot ==
In 1558, 42-year-old Catholic Queen Mary I of England, the daughter of Henry VIII and his first wife, Catherine of Aragon, dies, presumably from a cancerous tumor in her womb. Mary's heir presumptive and 25-year-old half sister, Lady Elizabeth, daughter of Henry and his second wife, Anne Boleyn, under house arrest for suspected involvement in Thomas Wyatt the Younger's rebellion, is now freed from her imprisonment and crowned as Queen of England.

As briefed by her advisor, Sir William Cecil, Elizabeth inherits a distressed England besieged by debts, crumbling infrastructure, hostile neighbours, and treasonous nobles within her administration, chief among them, Thomas Howard, 4th Duke of Norfolk. Cecil tells Elizabeth that she must marry, produce an heir, and secure her rule. Unimpressed with her suitors, Elizabeth delays her decision and continues her affair with Lord Robert Dudley, her childhood friend. Cecil appoints Francis Walsingham, a Protestant exile returned from France, to act as Elizabeth's bodyguard and advisor.

Mary of Guise, acting as regent for her young daughter, Mary, Queen of Scots, brings an additional 4,000 French troops to neighbouring Scotland. Unfamiliar with military strategy and browbeaten by Norfolk at the war council, Elizabeth orders a military response, which proves disastrous when the professional French soldiers defeat the inexperienced, ill-trained English forces. Walsingham tells Elizabeth that Catholic lords and priests intentionally deprived Elizabeth's army of proper soldiers and used their defeat to argue for Elizabeth's removal. Realising the depth of the conspiracy against her and her dwindling options, Elizabeth accepts Mary of Guise's conditions to consider marrying her nephew Henry, Duke of Anjou.

To stabilise her rule and heal England's religious divisions, Elizabeth proposes the Act of Uniformity, which unites English Christians under the Church of England and severs their connection to the Vatican. In response to the Act's passage, the Vatican sends a priest to England to aid Norfolk and his cohorts in their growing plot to overthrow Elizabeth. Unaware of the plot, Elizabeth meets Henry of France but ignores his advances in favour of Lord Robert. William Cecil confronts Elizabeth over her indecisiveness about marrying and reveals that Lord Dudley is married. Elizabeth rejects Henry's marriage proposal when she discovers he is a cross-dresser and confronts Lord Dudley about his secret, fracturing their affair and banishing him from her private rooms.

Elizabeth survives an assassination attempt, evidence implicating Mary of Guise. Elizabeth sends Walsingham to meet with Mary secretly in Scotland, under the pretence of once again planning to marry Henry. Instead, Walsingham assassinates Guise, inciting French enmity against Elizabeth. When William Cecil asks her to solidify relations with the Spanish, Elizabeth dismisses him from her service, choosing instead to follow her own counsel.

Walsingham warns of another plot to kill Elizabeth spearheaded by the Catholic priest carrying letters of conspiracy. Under Elizabeth's orders, he apprehends the priest, who divulges the names of the conspirators and a Vatican agreement to elevate Norfolk to the English crown if he weds Mary, Queen of Scots. Walsingham arrests Norfolk and executes him and every conspirator except Lord Robert. Elizabeth grants Lord Robert his life as a reminder to herself how close she came to danger.

Drawing inspiration from the divine, Elizabeth models her appearance after the Virgin Mary. Proclaiming herself to be married to England, she ascends the throne as the "Virgin Queen."

== Cast ==
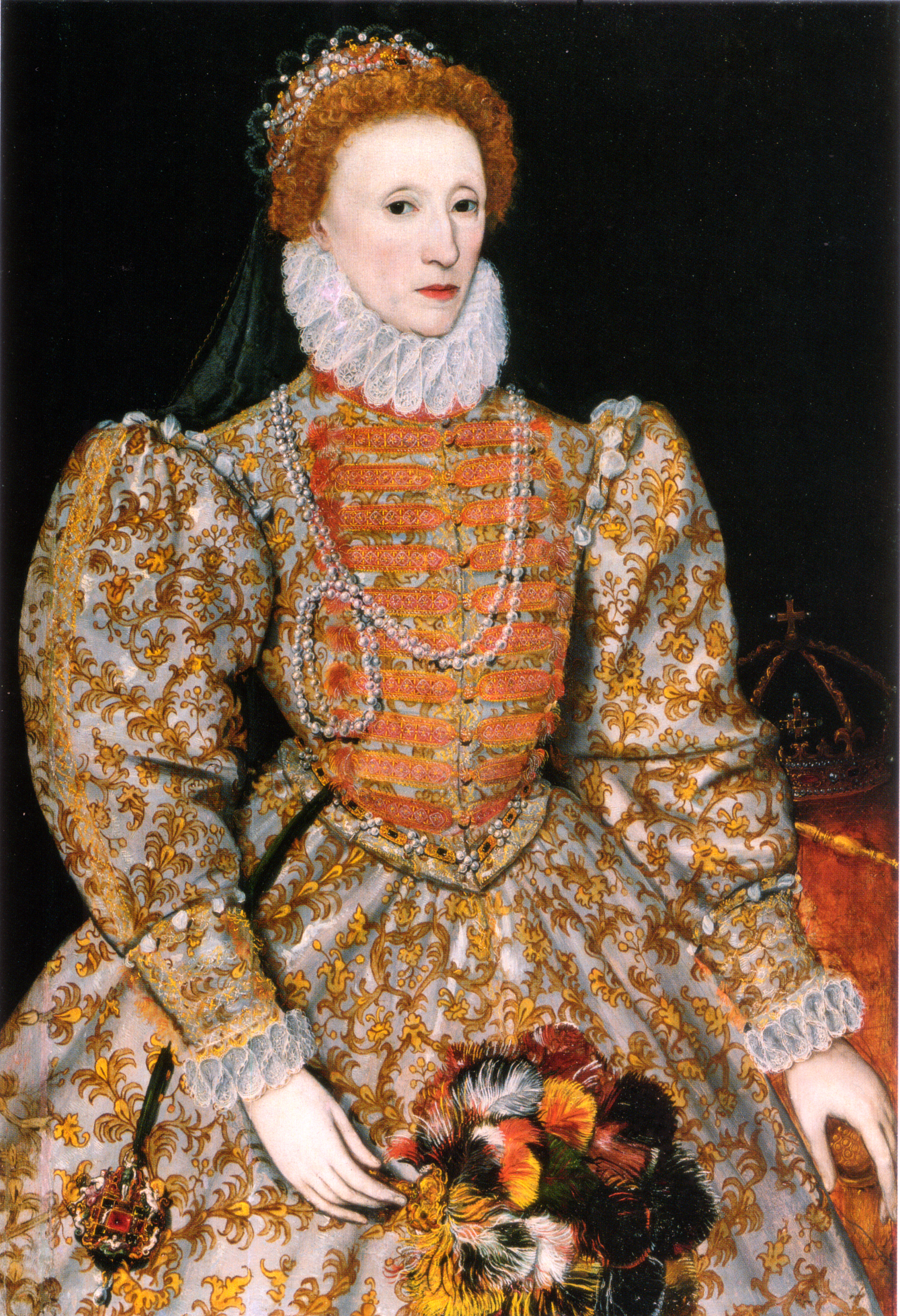
Queen Elizabeth I in the Darnley Portrait, c. 1575

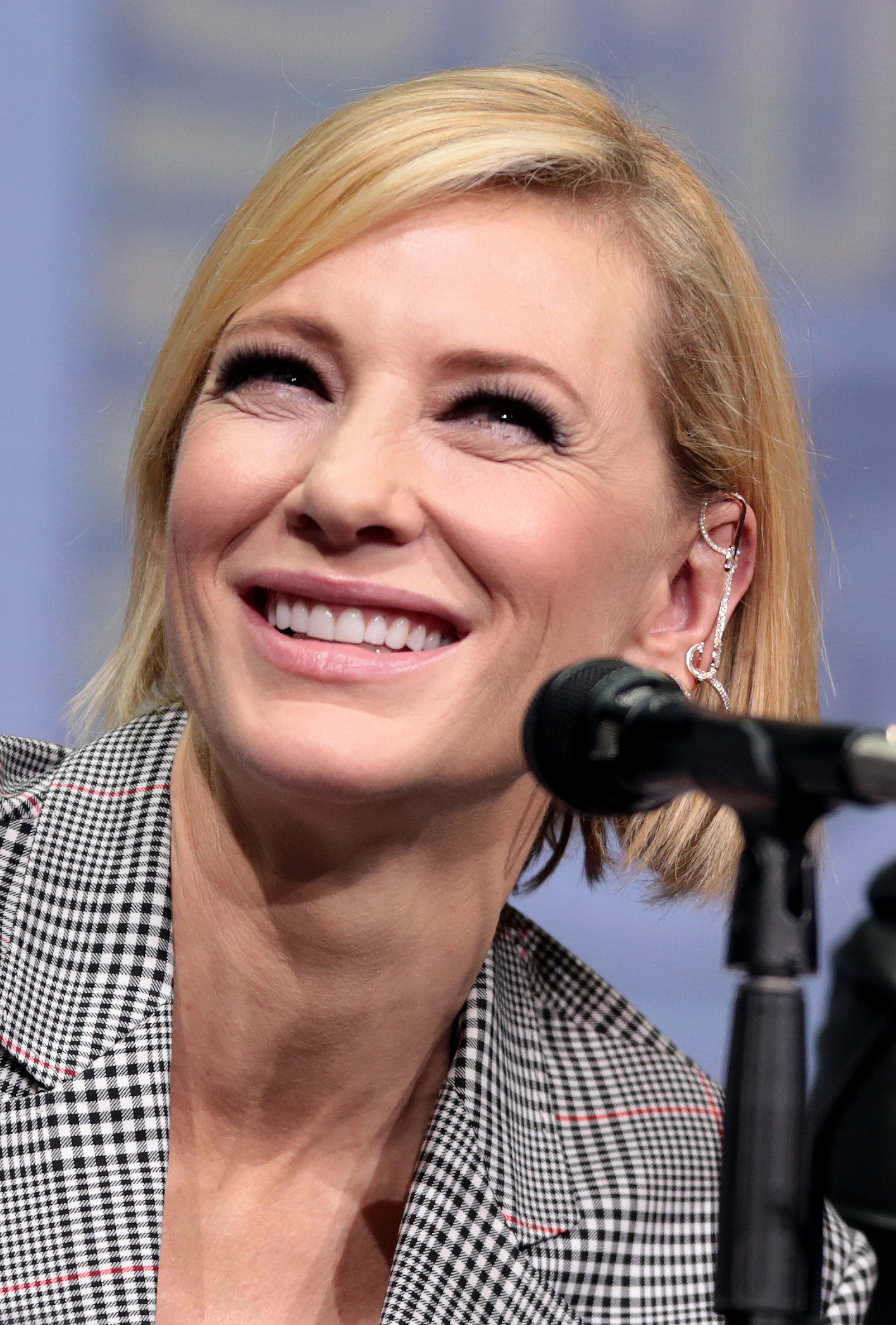
Cate Blanchett portrays the monarch in Elizabeth.

- Cate Blanchett as Queen Elizabeth I
- Geoffrey Rush as Francis Walsingham
- Joseph Fiennes as Robert Dudley, 1st Earl of Leicester
- Richard Attenborough as William Cecil, 1st Baron Burghley
- Christopher Eccleston as Thomas Howard, 4th Duke of Norfolk
- James Frain as Álvaro de la Quadra
- Eric Cantona as Paul de Foix
- Vincent Cassel as Henry, Duke of Anjou
- Kathy Burke as Queen Mary I
- Fanny Ardant as Mary of Guise
- Emily Mortimer as Kat Ashley
- Kelly Macdonald as Isabel Knollys
- Jamie Foreman as Earl of Sussex
- Edward Hardwicke as Henry Fitzalan, 12th Earl of Arundel
- Amanda Ryan as Lettice Howard
- Terence Rigby as Bishop Stephen Gardiner
- Daniel Craig as John Ballard
- John Gielgud as Pope Pius V
- Kenny Doughty as Sir Thomas Elyot
- Angus Deayton as Armagil Waad, Chancellor of the Exchequer
- Vladimir Vega as the Vatican Cardinal
- Rod Culbertson, Paul Fox, and Liz Giles as Protestant Martyrs
- George Yiasoumi as King Philip II of Spain
- Joe White as Master of the Tower
- Ben Frain as the Youth
- Brendan O'Hea as Lord William Howard
- Edward Highmore as Lord Harewood
- Joseph O'Conor as Earl of Derby
- Viviane Horne as Lady Arundel
- Daisy Bevan as Arundel's Daughter
- Alfie Allen as Arundel's son
- Jennifer Lewicki as Arundel's Housemaid
- Michael Beint as Bishop Carlisle
- Peter Stockbridge as Palace Chamberlain
- Wayne Sleep as dance tutor
- Nick Smallman as the Executioner
- Lewis Jones as Catholic priest
- Valerie Gale as Mary's lady-in-waiting
- Lily Allen, Sarah Owens, Hayley Burroughs, Kate Loustau, Sally Grey, and Elika Gibbs as Elizabeth's ladies-in-waiting

== Production ==
The costuming and shot composition of the coronation scene are based on Elizabeth's coronation portrait.

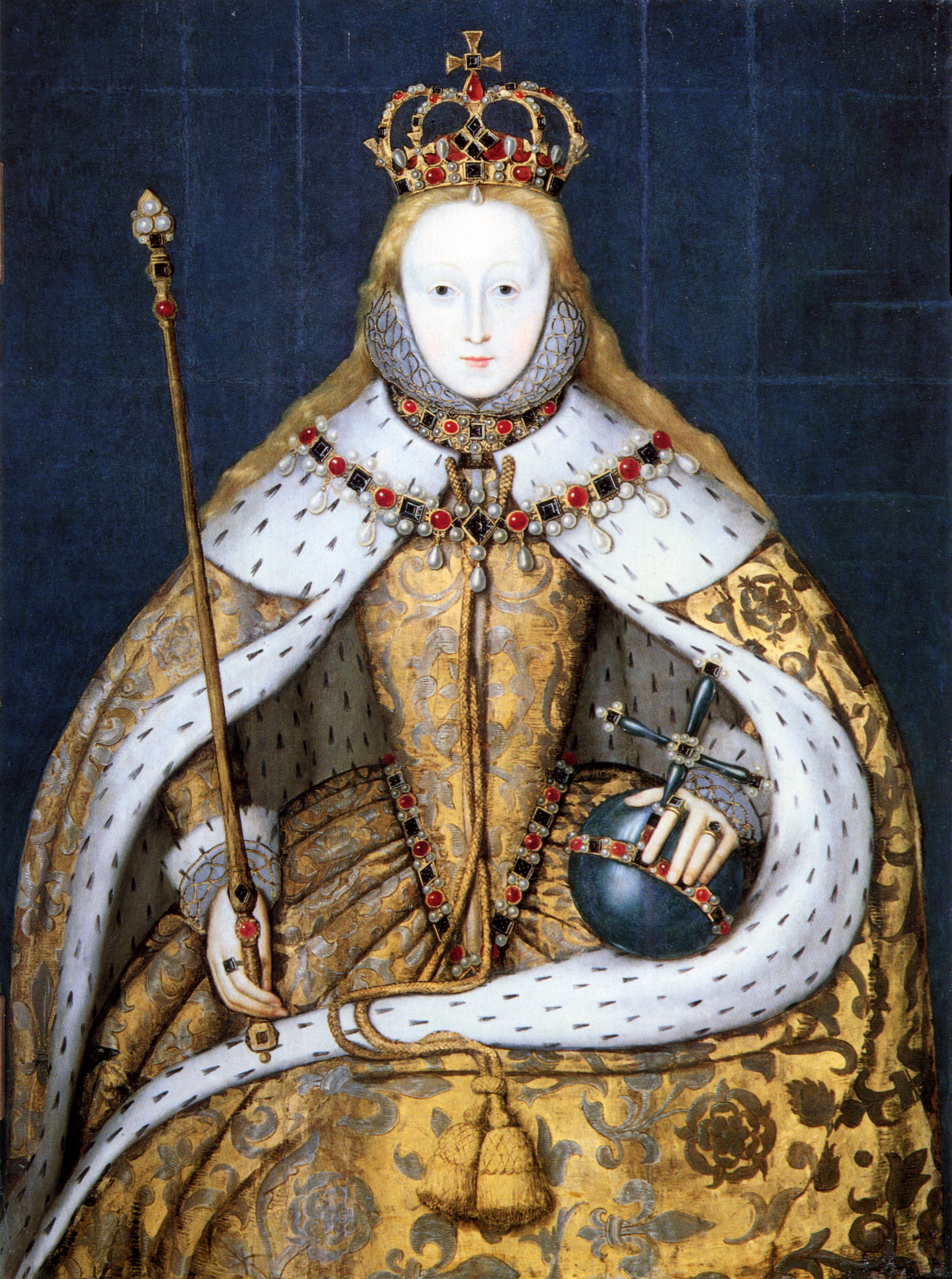
This portrait "The Coronation of Elizabeth" was used as the basis for the photography and costume of Cate Blanchett during the coronation scene in the film. This is a copy (attrib. Nicholas Hilliard) of a now lost original.

Principal photography began on 2 September 1997 and completed on 2 December 1997

Kapur's original choice for the role was Emily Watson, but she turned it down. Cate Blanchett was chosen to play Elizabeth after Kapur saw a trailer of Oscar and Lucinda. According to the director's commentary, Kapur mentioned that the role of the Pope (played by Sir John Gielgud) was originally offered to, and accepted by, Marlon Brando. However, plans changed when Kapur noted that many on set would probably be concerned that Brando would be sharing the set with them for two days.

A large proportion of the indoor filming, representing the royal palace, was conducted in various corners of Durham Cathedral; its unique lozenge-carved nave pillars are clearly identifiable.

== Release ==
Elizabeth premiered in September 1998 at the Venice Film Festival; it was also shown at the Toronto International Film Festival. It premiered in London on 2 October 1998 and it premiered in the United States on 13 October 1998. It opened in the United Kingdom on 23 October 1998 and opened in limited release in the United States in nine cinemas on 6 November 1998, grossing $275,131. Its widest release in the United States and Canada was in 624 cinemas, and its largest weekend gross throughout its run in cinemas in the US and Canada was $3.8 million in 516 cinemas, ranking No.9 at the box office. Elizabeth went on to gross $30 million in the United States and Canada, and a total of $82 million worldwide.

== Reception ==
=== Critical response ===
The film was well received by critics. It holds an approval rating of 83% on the review aggregator website Rotten Tomatoes based on 66 reviews, with an average score of 7.5/10. The site's consensus reads: "No mere historical drama, Elizabeth is a rich, suspenseful journey into the heart of British Royal politics, and features a typically outstanding performance from Cate Blanchett." Metacritic reports a score of 75 out of 100 based on 30 critics, indicating "generally favorable reviews".

=== Historical accuracy ===
Elizabeth received some criticism for factual liberties it takes and for its distortion of the historical timeline to present events that occurred in the middle to later part of Elizabeth's reign as occurring at the beginning. In his entry for Elizabeth I in the Oxford Dictionary of National Biography, Patrick Collinson described the film "as if the known facts of the reign, plus many hitherto unknown, were shaken up like pieces of a jigsaw and scattered on the table at random." Carole Levin, reviewing the film in 1999 for Perspectives on History, criticised the movie for portraying Elizabeth as "a very weak and flighty character who often showed terrible judgment", in contrast to historical descriptions of her as a strong, decisive, and intelligent ruler. In particular, Levin described the movie's portrayal of Elizabeth as dependent on Walsingham, in addition to the completely inaccurate portrayal of her relationship with Robert Dudley; such instances in the film make her character appear weak and overpowered by the men around her.

=== Accusations of anti-Catholicism ===
The Catholic League for Religious and Civil Rights accused the film of anti-Catholicism, stating that the film gives the "impression that the religious strife was all the doing of the Catholic Church", noting that the review in The New York Times considered it "resolutely anti-Catholic" complete with a "scheming pope" and repeating the charge made in the Buffalo News that "every single Catholic in the film is dark, cruel and devious."

== Awards and nominations ==
Award	Category	Nominee(s)	Result	Ref.
Academy Awards	Best Picture	Alison Owen, Eric Fellner, and Tim Bevan	Nominated	
Academy Awards	Best Actress	Cate Blanchett	Nominated	
Academy Awards	Best Art Direction	Art Direction: John Myhre; Set Decoration: Peter Howitt	Nominated	
Academy Awards	Best Cinematography	Remi Adefarasin	Nominated	
Academy Awards	Best Costume Design	Alexandra Byrne	Nominated	
Academy Awards	Best Makeup	Jenny Shircore	Won	
Academy Awards	Best Original Dramatic Score	David Hirschfelder	Nominated	
American Society of Cinematographers Awards	Outstanding Achievement in Cinematography in Theatrical Releases	Remi Adefarasin	Nominated	
Art Directors Guild Awards	Excellence in Production Design for a Feature Film	John Myhre	Nominated	
British Academy Film Awards	Best Film	Alison Owen, Eric Fellner, and Tim Bevan	Nominated	
British Academy Film Awards	Outstanding British Film	Alison Owen, Eric Fellner, Tim Bevan, and Shekhar Kapur	Won	
British Academy Film Awards	Best Direction	Shekhar Kapur	Nominated	
British Academy Film Awards	Best Actress in a Leading Role	Cate Blanchett	Won	
British Academy Film Awards	Best Actor in a Supporting Role	Geoffrey Rush	Nominated	
British Academy Film Awards	Best Original Screenplay	Michael Hirst	Nominated	
British Academy Film Awards	Best Cinematography	Remi Adefarasin	Won	
British Academy Film Awards	Best Costume Design	Alexandra Byrne	Nominated	
British Academy Film Awards	Best Editing	Jill Bilcock	Nominated	
British Academy Film Awards	Best Make-Up and Hair	Jenny Shircore	Won	
British Academy Film Awards	Best Original Film Music	David Hirschfelder	Won	
British Academy Film Awards	Best Production Design	John Myhre	Nominated	
British Society of Cinematographers Awards	Best Cinematography in a Theatrical Feature Film	Remi Adefarasin	Won	
Chicago Film Critics Association Awards	Best Actress	Cate Blanchett	Won	
Chicago Film Critics Association Awards	Best Cinematography	Remi Adefarasin	Nominated	
Chicago Film Critics Association Awards	Best Original Score	David Hirschfelder	Nominated	
Chlotrudis Awards	Best Movie		Nominated	
Chlotrudis Awards	Best Actress	Cate Blanchett	Won	
Chlotrudis Awards	Best Supporting Actor	Geoffrey Rush (also for Shakespeare in Love)	Nominated	
Chlotrudis Awards	Best Cinematography	Remi Adefarasin	Nominated	
Critics' Choice Movie Awards	Best Picture		Nominated	
Critics' Choice Movie Awards	Best Actress	Cate Blanchett	Won	
Critics' Choice Movie Awards	Breakthrough Artist	Joseph Fiennes (also for Shakespeare in Love)	Won	
Empire Awards	Best Actress	Cate Blanchett	Won	
Golden Globe Awards	Best Motion Picture – Drama		Nominated	
Golden Globe Awards	Best Actress in a Motion Picture – Drama	Cate Blanchett	Won	
Golden Globe Awards	Best Director – Motion Picture	Shekhar Kapur	Nominated	
Las Vegas Film Critics Society Awards	Most Promising Actress	Cate Blanchett	Won	
London Critics Circle Film Awards	Actress of the Year	Cate Blanchett	Won	
London Critics Circle Film Awards	British Producer of the Year	Alison Owen, Tim Bevan, and Eric Fellner	Won	
National Board of Review Awards	Top Ten Films		3rd Place	
National Board of Review Awards	Best Director	Shekhar Kapur	Won	
Online Film Critics Society Awards	Best Actress	Cate Blanchett	Won	
Satellite Awards	Best Motion Picture – Drama		Nominated	
Satellite Awards	Best Actress in a Motion Picture – Drama	Cate Blanchett	Won	
Satellite Awards	Best Director	Shekhar Kapur	Nominated	
Satellite Awards	Best Art Direction	John Myhre	Nominated	
Satellite Awards	Best Costume Design	Alexandra Byrne	Won	
Screen Actors Guild Awards	Outstanding Performance by a Female Actor in a Leading Role	Cate Blanchett	Nominated	
Southeastern Film Critics Association Awards	Best Picture		6th Place	
Southeastern Film Critics Association Awards	Best Actress	Cate Blanchett (also for Oscar and Lucinda)	Won	
Toronto Film Critics Association Awards	Best Actress	Cate Blanchett	Won	
Venice International Film Festival	Max Factor Award	Jenny Shircore	Won	

== See also ==
- BFI Top 100 British films
