= Dominic Lester =

American sound engineer

- Occupation: Sound engineer
- Years active: 1987-2000

Dominic Lester is an American sound engineer. He was nominated for an Academy Award in the Best Sound category for the film Shakespeare in Love. He worked on 59 films from 1987 to 2000.

== Selected filmography ==
- Shakespeare in Love (1998)
