= Badia delle Sante Flora e Lucilla =

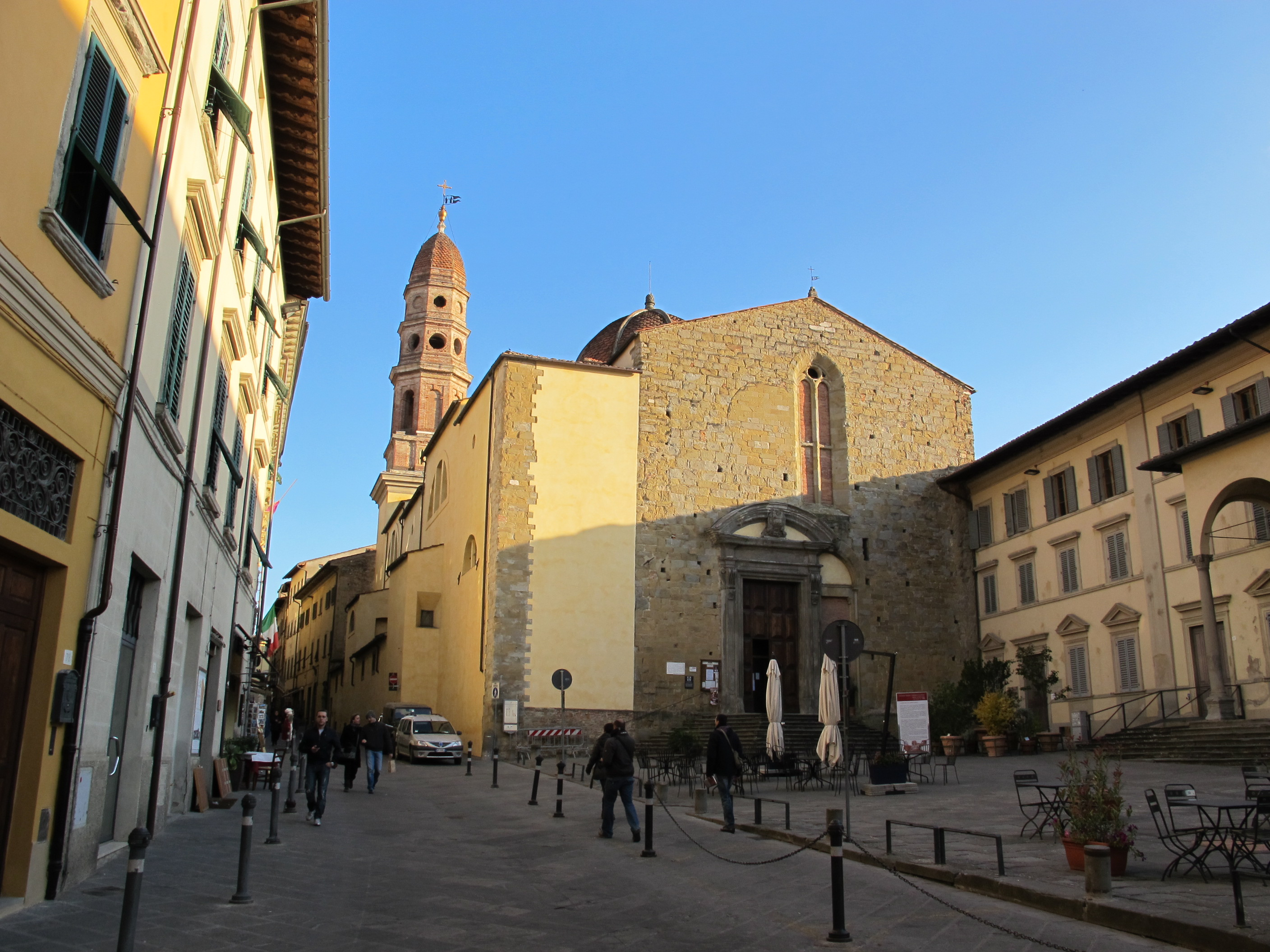
- Badia delle Sante Flora e Lucilla
- Badia delle Sante Flora e Lucilla
- 43.4654°N 11.8794°E
- Country: Italy
- Denomination: Roman Catholic

History
- Dedication: Sante Flora e Lucilla

Administration
- Archdiocese: Florence
- Diocese: Arezzo-Cortona-Sansepolcro

The Badia delle Sante Flora e Lucilla or Abbey of Saints Flora e Lucilla is a medieval abbey in Arezzo, Tuscany, Italy.

== History ==
Construction of the church began in 1278; and by 1315, the adjacent monastery was built. The cloister (1489) was designed by Giuliano da Maiano. The church was rebuilt starting in 1565 under the designs of Giorgio Vasari. The work was not completed till 1650, when the bell-tower and presbytery were completed.

The presbytery has altar (1563) designed by Vasari for his family and once in his parish church of Santa Maria, and moved here in 1865. The church also houses a painted Crucifix (1319) by Segna di Bonaventura and frescoes of the life of St Lawrence (1476) by Bartolomeo della Gatta. The cupola was painted on canvas (1702) by the Baroque painter Andrea Pozzo.
