= Elda Ferri =

Italian film producer

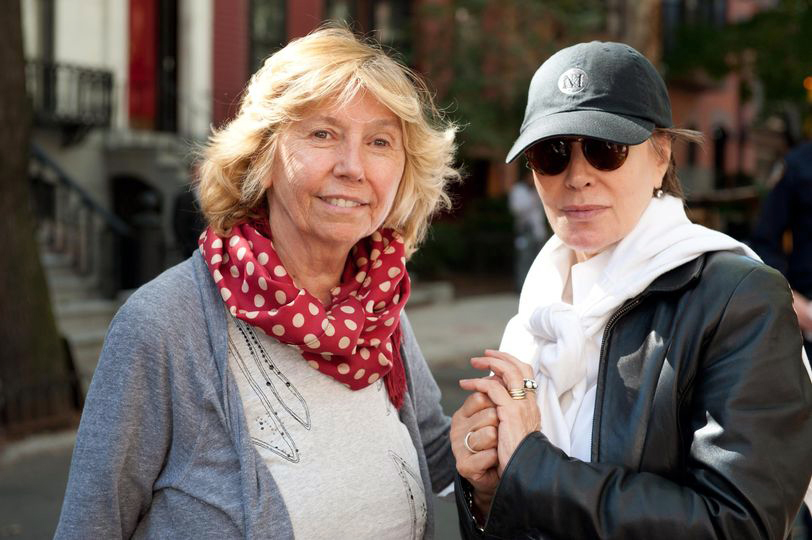
- Elda Ferri (left) with Milena Canonero on the set of Someday This Pain Will Be Useful to You (2011).
- Born: 12 November 1937 (age 88); Bologna, Kingdom of Italy
- Occupation: Producer
- Years active: 1977–present

Elda Ferri (born 12 November 1937) is an Italian film producer.

She is the administrator of the company Jean Vigo Italia S.r.l.. She co-produced the comedy Life Is Beautiful (1997) with Gianluigi Braschi, for which they both received an Academy Award nomination for Best Picture. The film also earned them a David di Donatello for Best Producer as well as a European Film Award for Best Film.

In 2005, she was awarded the prize of the "European producer of the year".
