= 4th Critics' Choice Awards =

1999 US film awards

4th Critics' Choice Movie Awards
- Date: January 25, 1999
- Official website: www.criticschoice.com

Highlights
- Best Film: Saving Private Ryan

The 4th Critics' Choice Movie Awards were presented on January 25, 1999, honoring the finest achievements of 1998 filmmaking.

== Top 10 films ==
(in alphabetical order)

- Elizabeth
- Gods and Monsters
- Life Is Beautiful (La vita è bella)
- Out of Sight
- Pleasantville
- Saving Private Ryan
- Shakespeare in Love
- A Simple Plan
- The Thin Red Line
- The Truman Show

== Winners ==
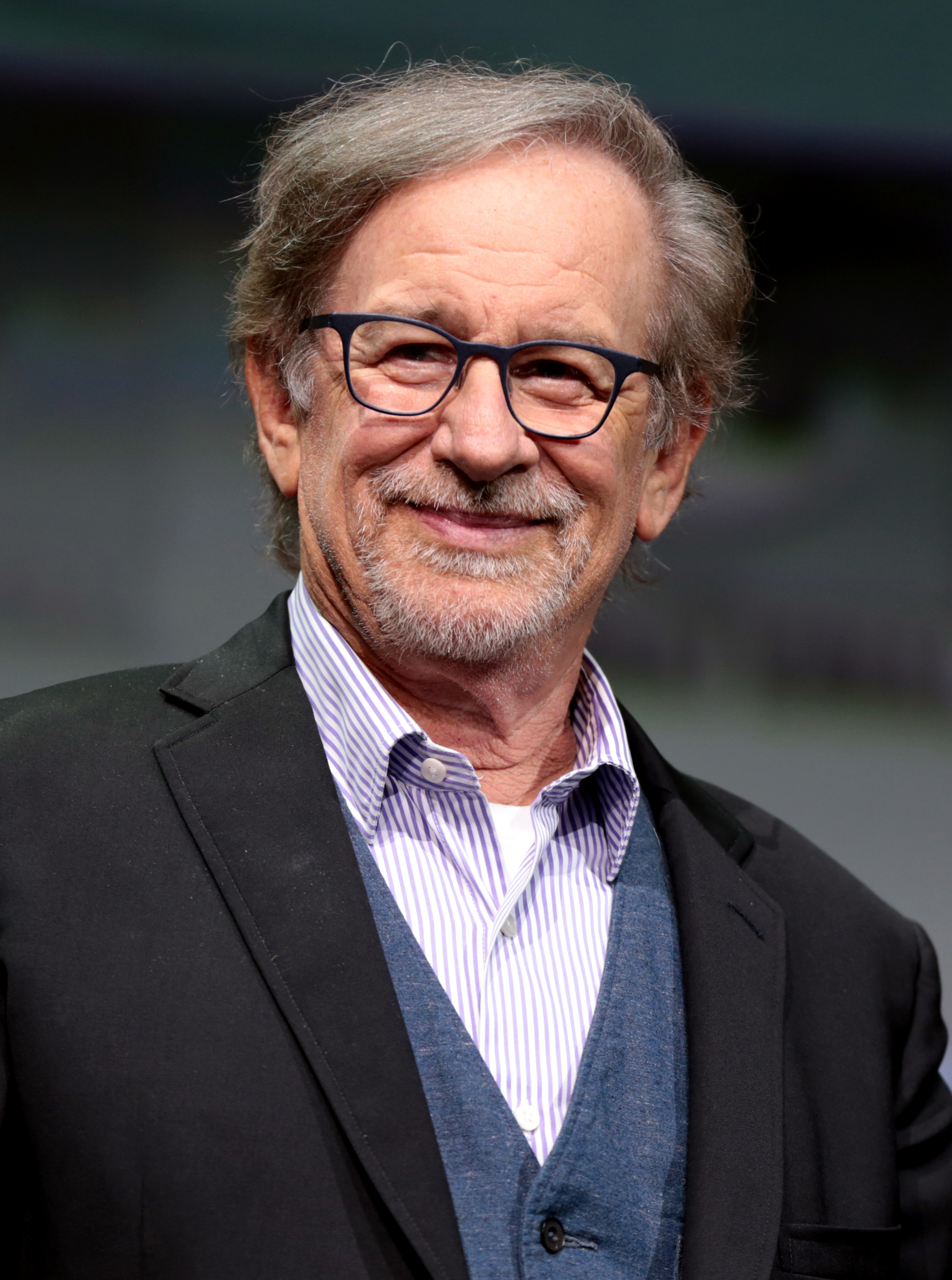
Steven Spielberg, Best Director winner

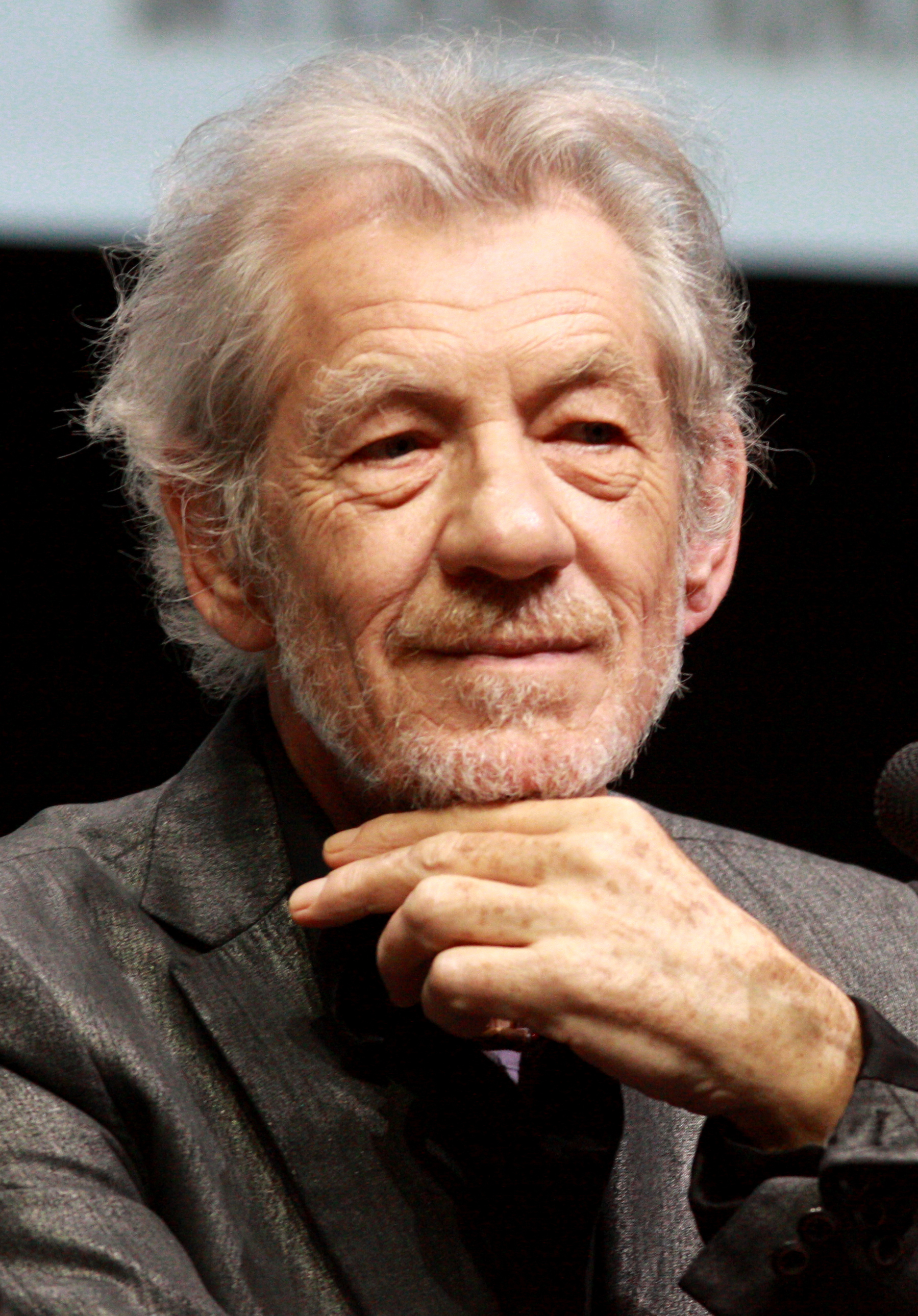
Ian McKellen, Best Actor winner

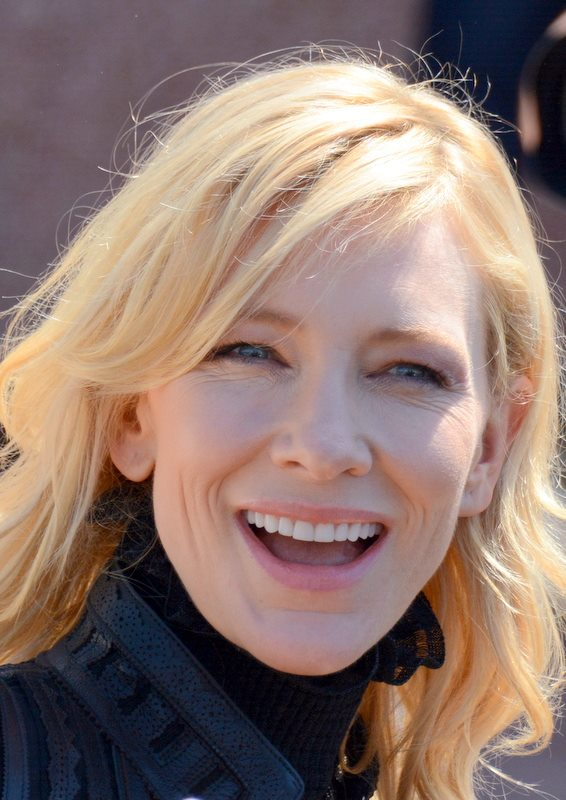
Cate Blanchett, Best Actress winner

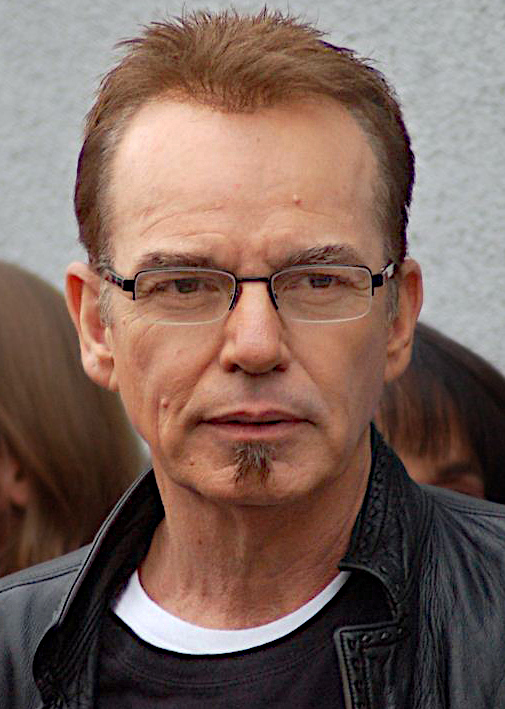
Billy Bob Thornton, Best Supporting Actor winner

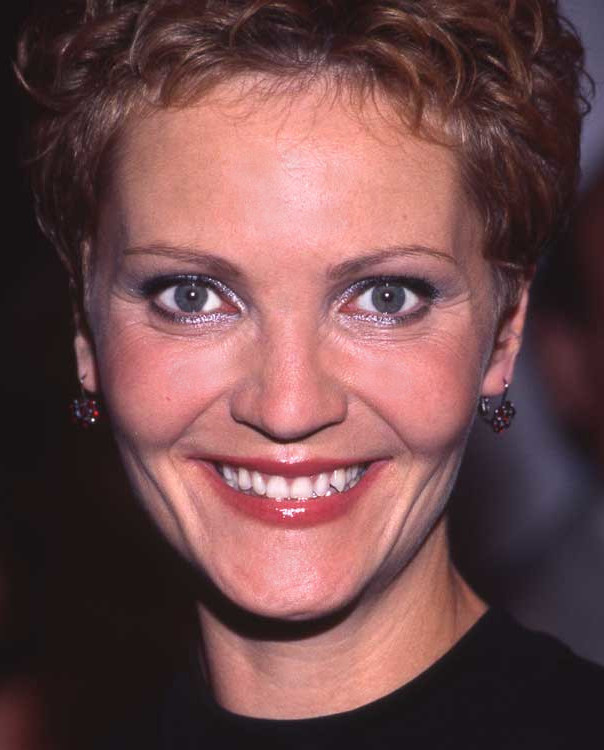
Joan Allen, Best Supporting Actress co-winner

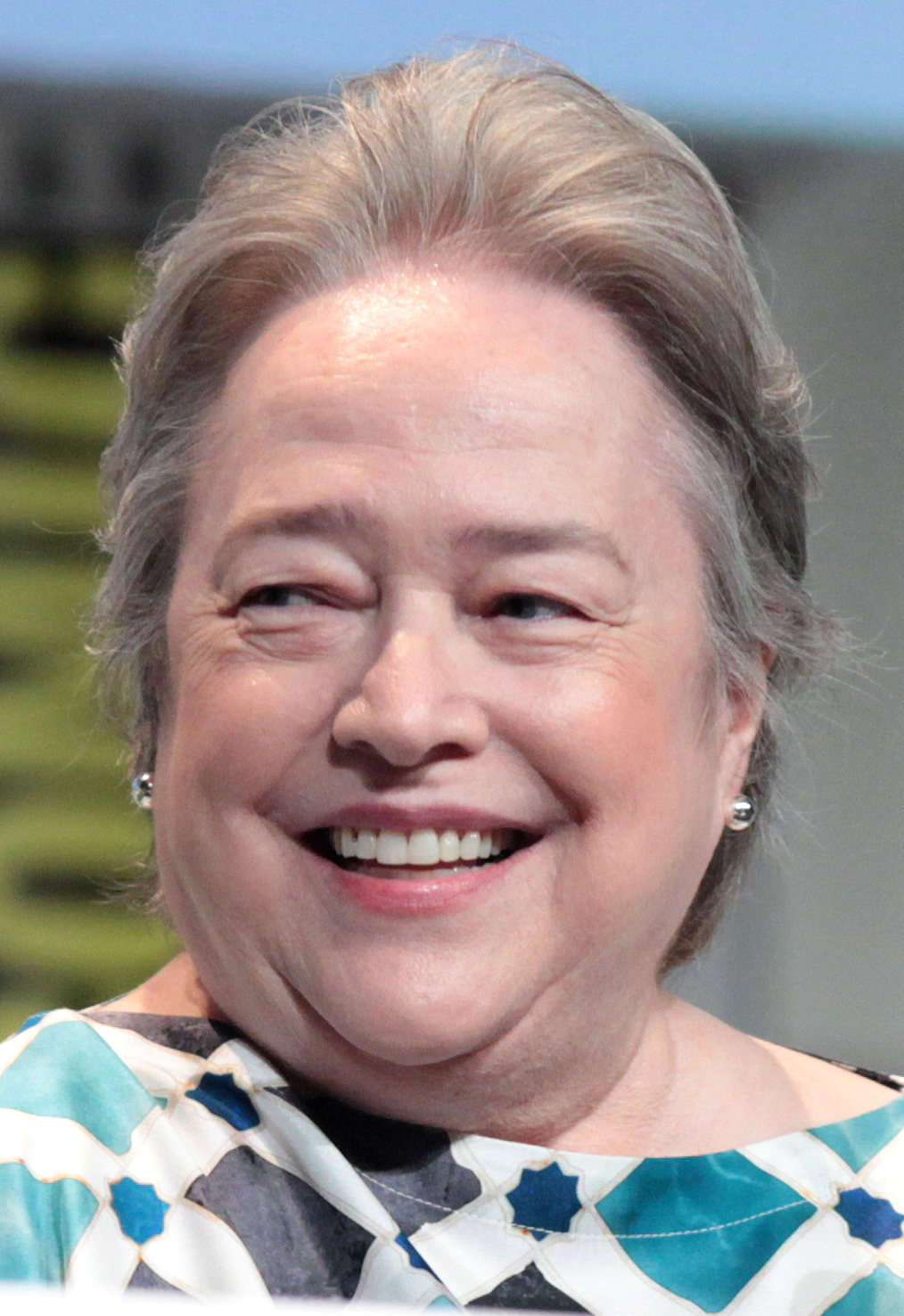
Kathy Bates, Best Supporting Actress co-winner

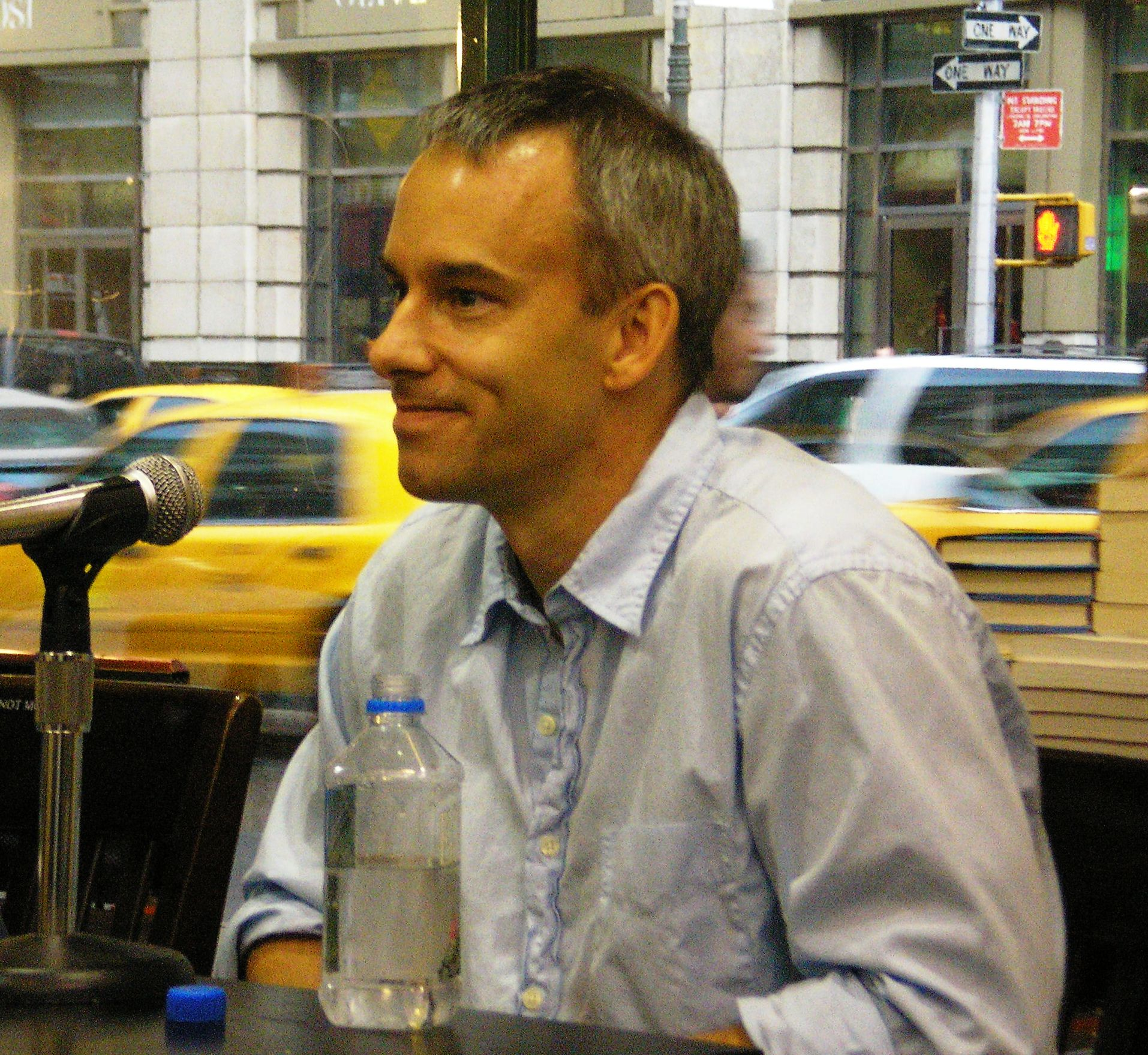
Scott Smith, Best Adapted Screenplay winner

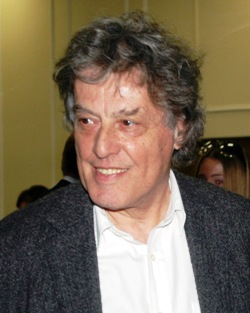
Tom Stoppard, Best Original Screenplay co-winner

- Best Actor:
  - Ian McKellen – Gods and Monsters and Apt Pupil
- Best Actress:
  - Cate Blanchett – Elizabeth
- Best Animated Feature:
  - A Bug's Life / The Prince of Egypt (TIE)
- Best Child Performer:
  - Ian Michael Smith – Simon Birch
- Best Director:
  - Steven Spielberg – Saving Private Ryan
- Best Family Film:
  - A Bug's Life
- Best Feature Documentary:
  - Wild Man Blues
- Best Foreign Language Film:
  - Life Is Beautiful (La vita è bella) • Italy
- Best Picture:
  - Saving Private Ryan
- Best Picture Made for Television:
  - From the Earth to the Moon
- Best Score:
  - John Williams – Saving Private Ryan
- Best Screenplay – Adaptation:
  - A Simple Plan – Scott B. Smith
- Best Screenplay – Original:
  - Shakespeare in Love – Tom Stoppard and Marc Norman
- Best Song:
  - "When You Believe" – The Prince of Egypt
- Best Supporting Actor:
  - Billy Bob Thornton – A Simple Plan
- Best Supporting Actress:
  - Joan Allen – Pleasantville / Kathy Bates – Primary Colors (TIE)
- Breakthrough Performer:
  - Joseph Fiennes – Elizabeth and Shakespeare in Love
- Alan J. Pakula Award (for artistic excellence while illuminating issues of great social and political importance):
  - John Travolta
