= 56th Golden Globe Awards =

Film award ceremony in 1999

- Date: January 24, 1999
- Site: Beverly Hilton Hotel; Beverly Hills, California

Highlights
- Best Film: Drama: Saving Private Ryan
- Best Film: Musical or Comedy: Shakespeare in Love
- Best Drama Series: The Practice
- Best Musical or Comedy Series: Ally McBeal
- Most awards: (3) Shakespeare in Love; The Truman Show
- Most nominations: (6) Shakespeare in Love; The Truman Show

Television coverage
- Network: NBC

The 56th Golden Globe Awards honored the best in film and television of 1998 as chosen by the HFPA, were held on January 24, 1999, at the Beverly Hilton Hotel in Beverly Hills, California. The ceremony was produced by Dick Clark Productions and the HFPA and aired on NBC in the United States. The nominations were announced on December 17, 1998.

== Winners and nominees ==
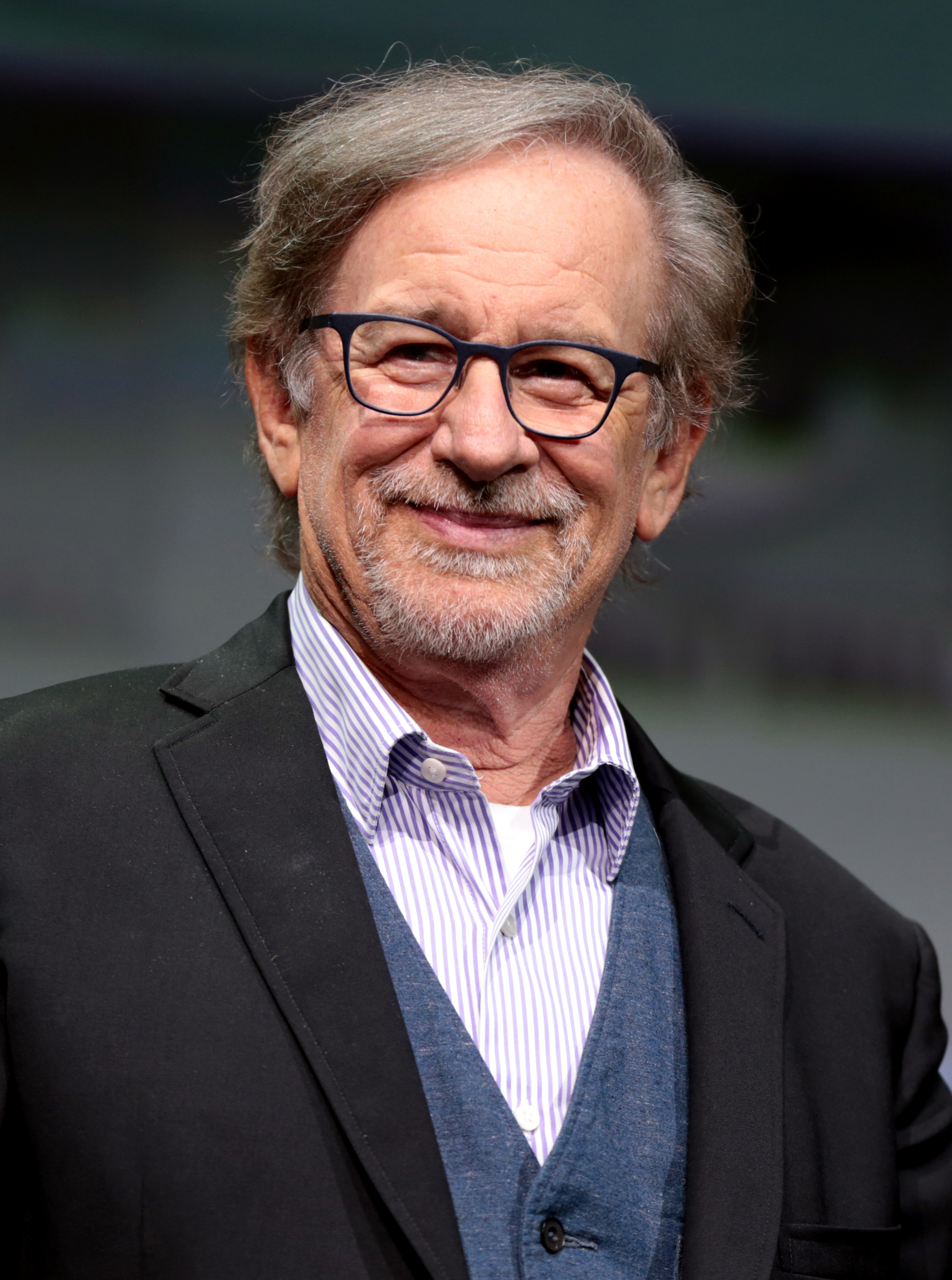
Steven Spielberg — Best Director, winner

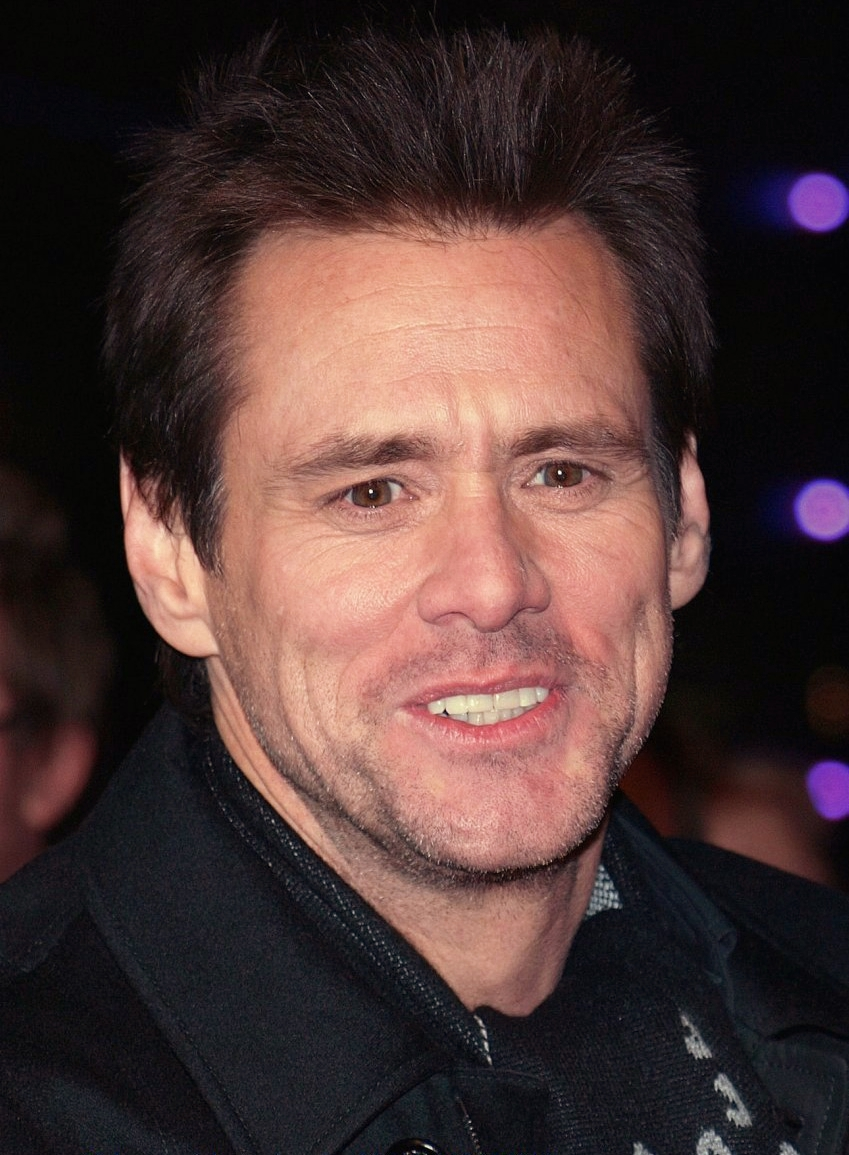
Jim Carrey — Best Actor in a Motion Picture, Drama winner

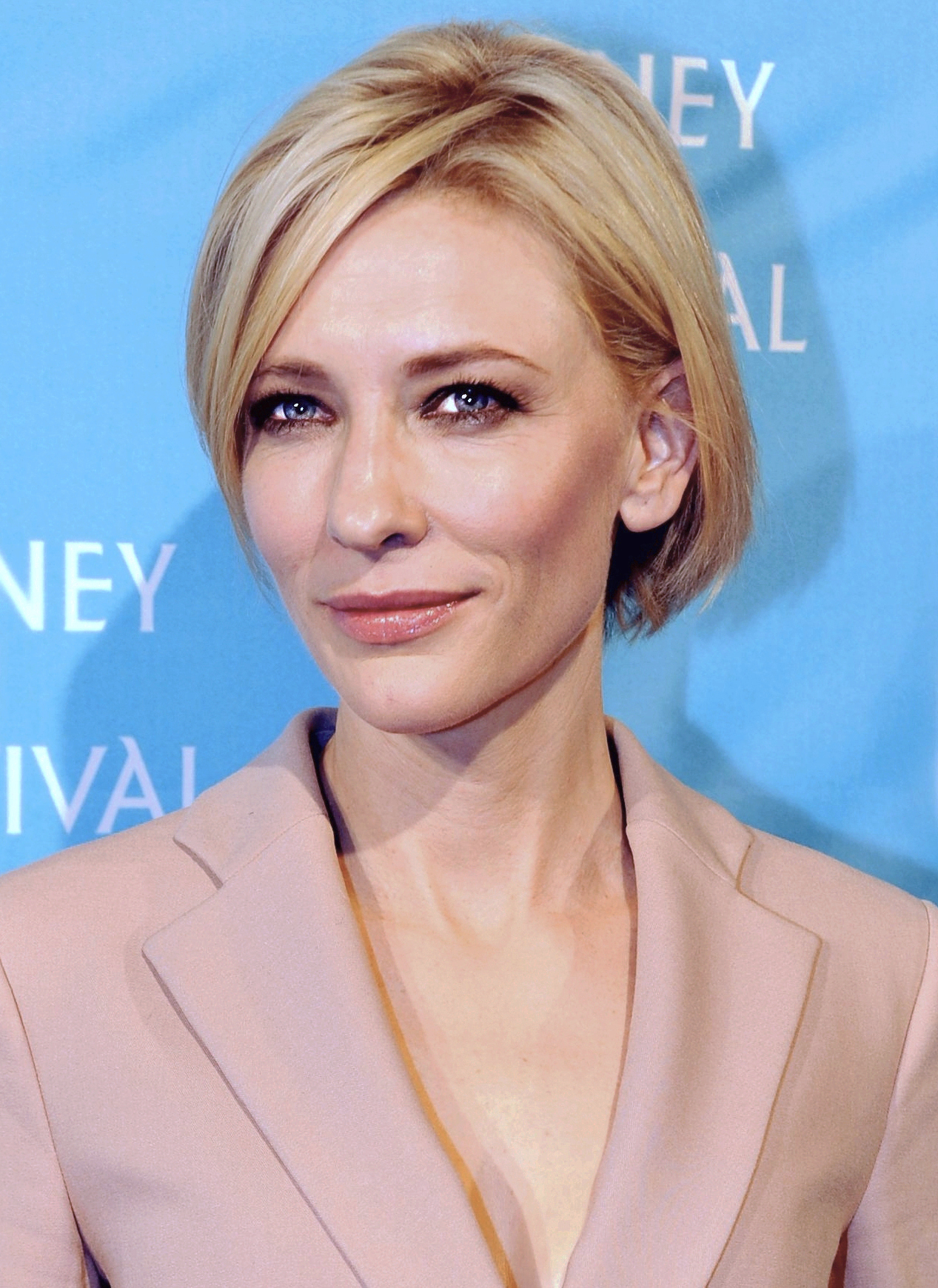
Cate Blanchett — Best Actress in a Motion Picture, Drama winner

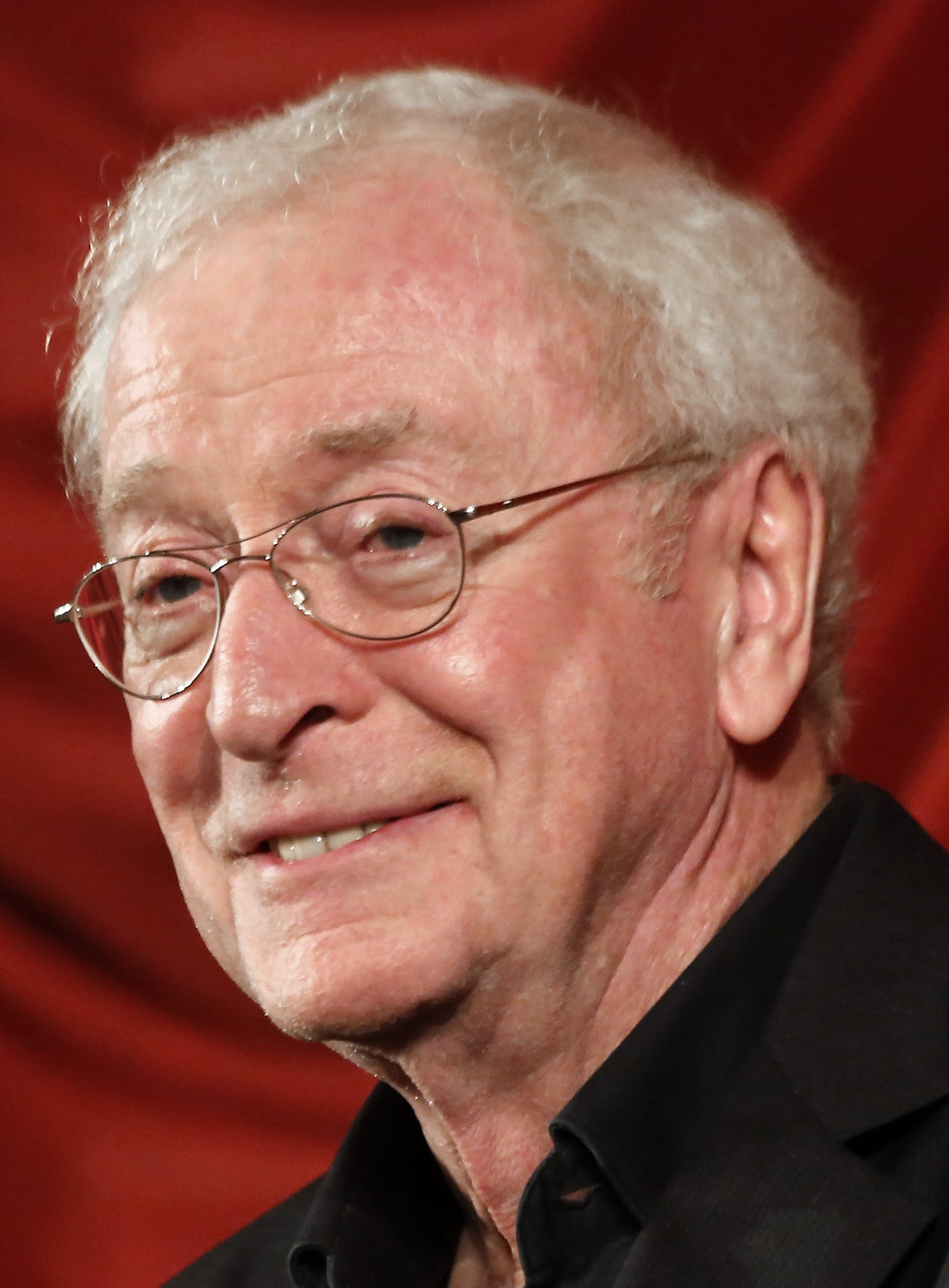
Michael Caine — Best Actor in a Motion Picture, Musical or Comedy winner

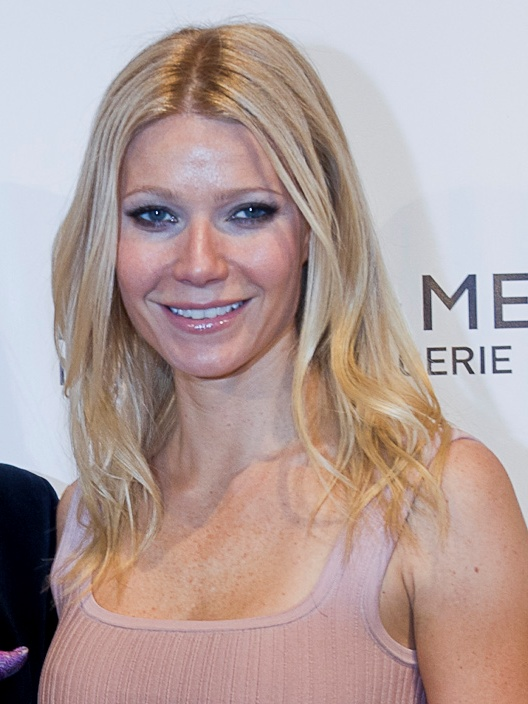
Gwyneth Paltrow — Best Actress in a Motion Picture, Musical or Comedy winner

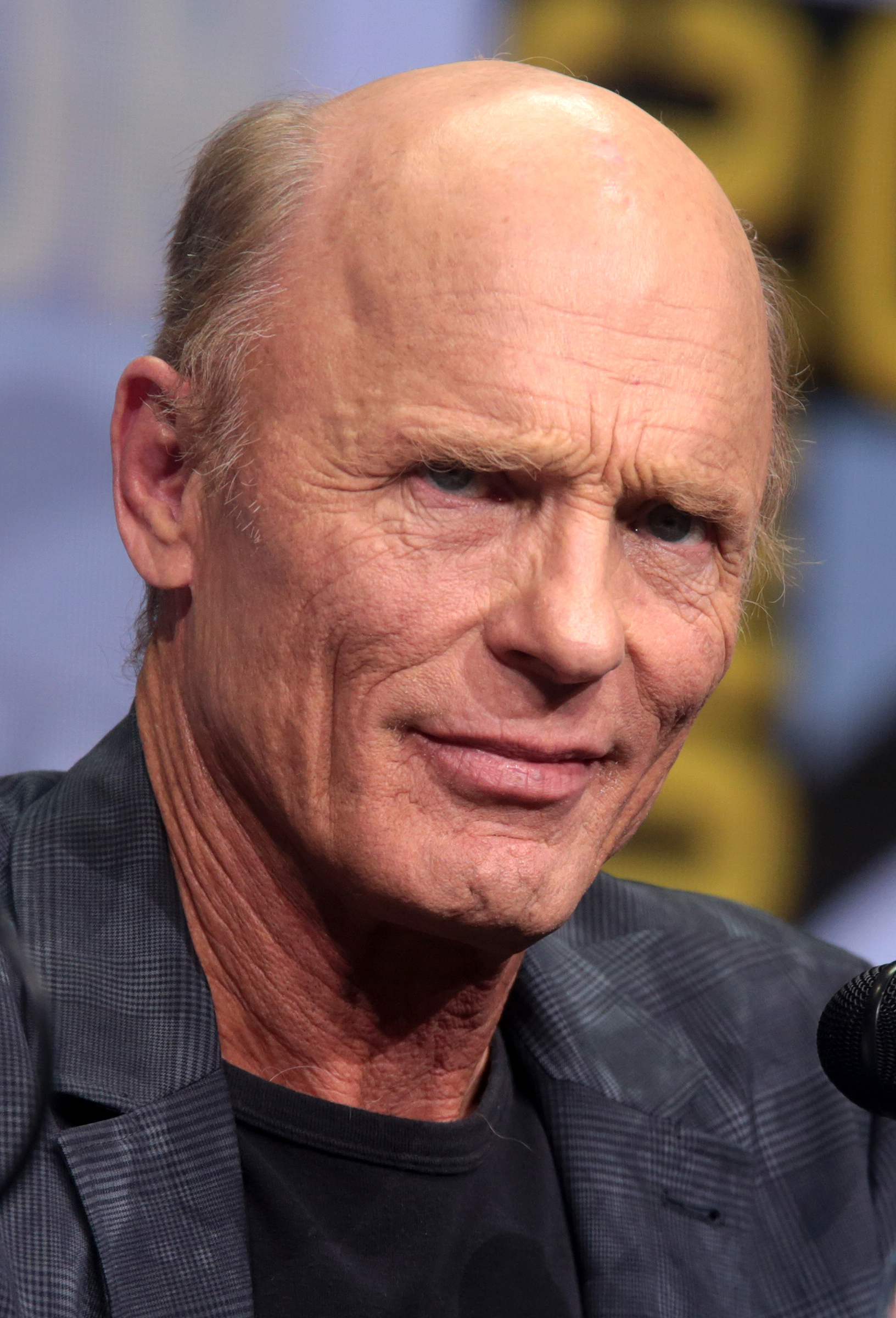
Ed Harris — Best Supporting Actor in a Motion Picture Drama, Musical or Comedy winner

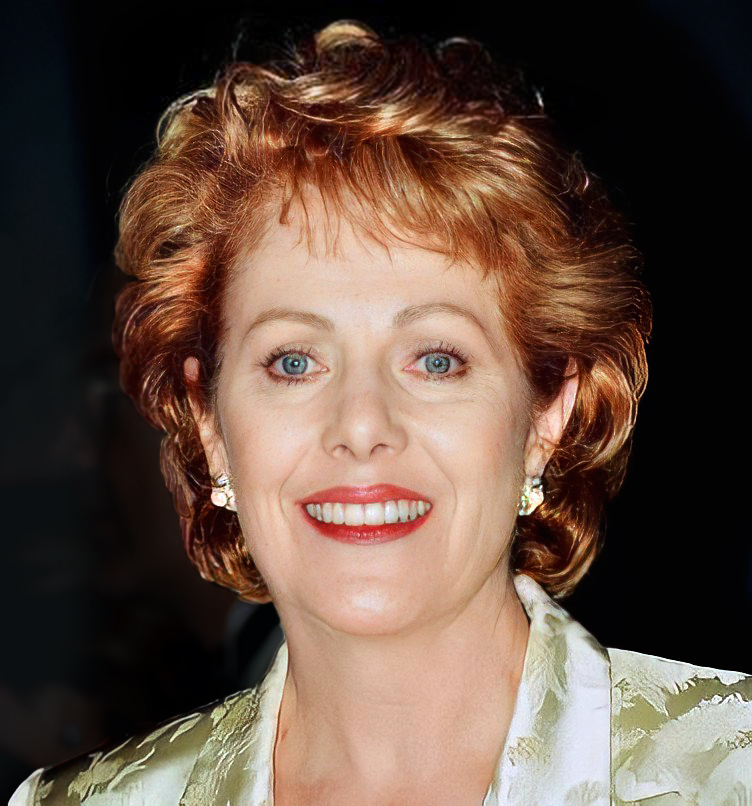
Lynn Redgrave — Best Supporting Actress in a Motion Picture Drama, Musical or Comedy winner

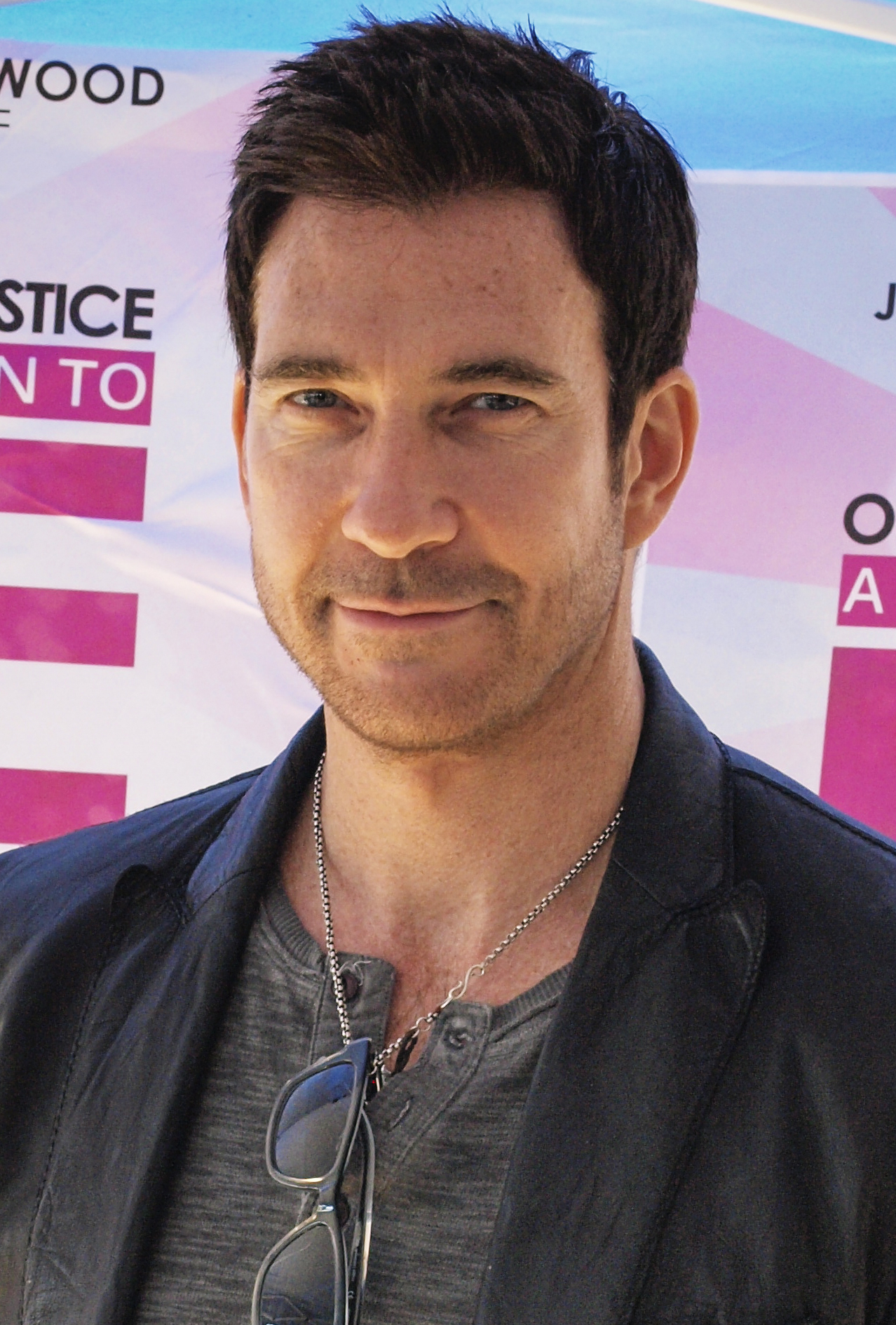
Dylan McDermott — Best Actor in a Television Series, Drama winner

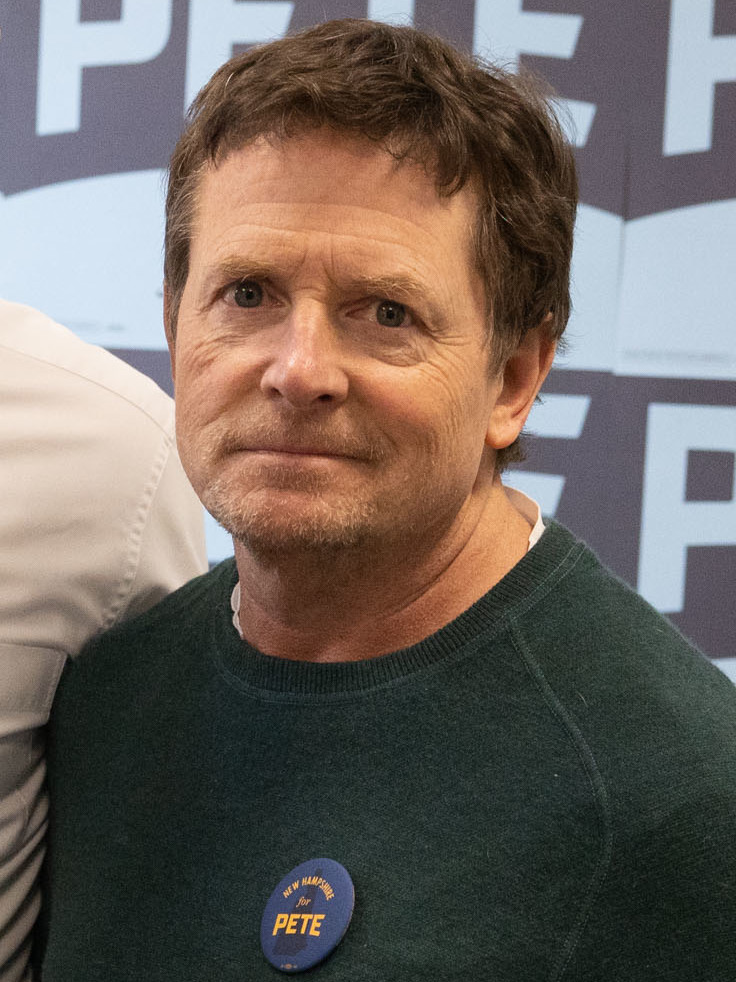
Michael J. Fox — Best Actor in a Television Series, Musical or Comedy winner

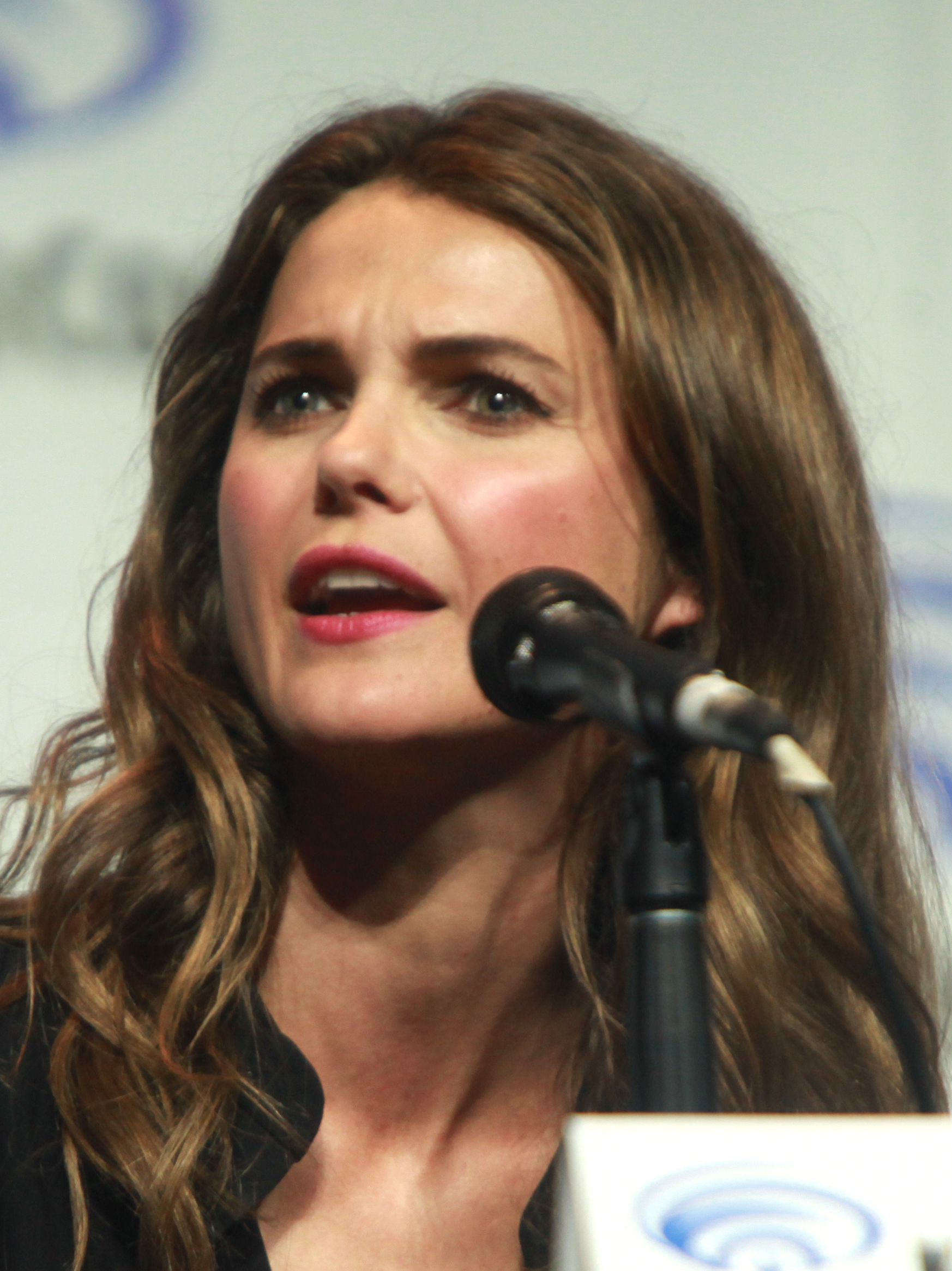
Keri Russell — Best Actress in a Television Series, Drama winner

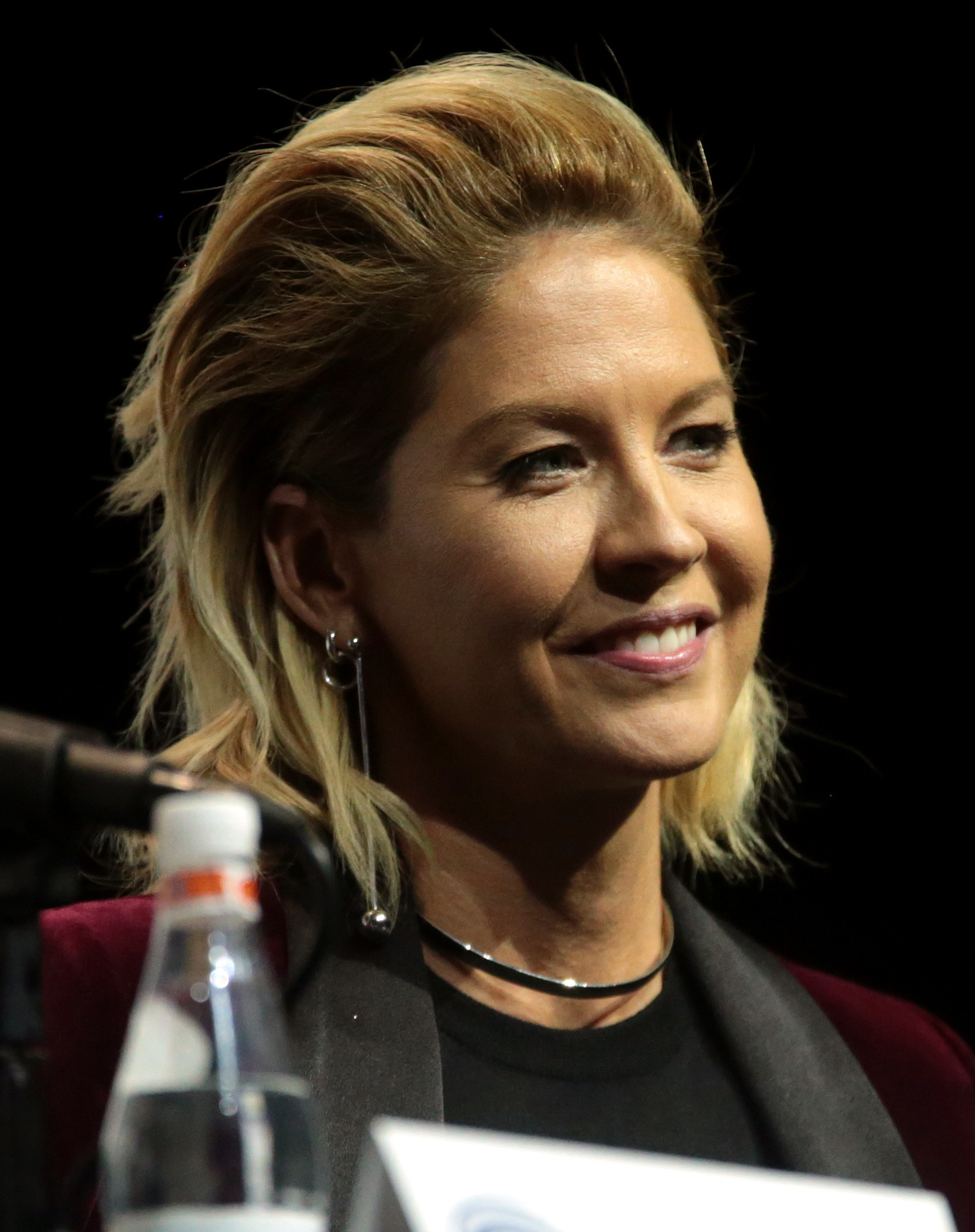
Jenna Elfman — Best Actress in a Television Series, Musical or Comedy winner

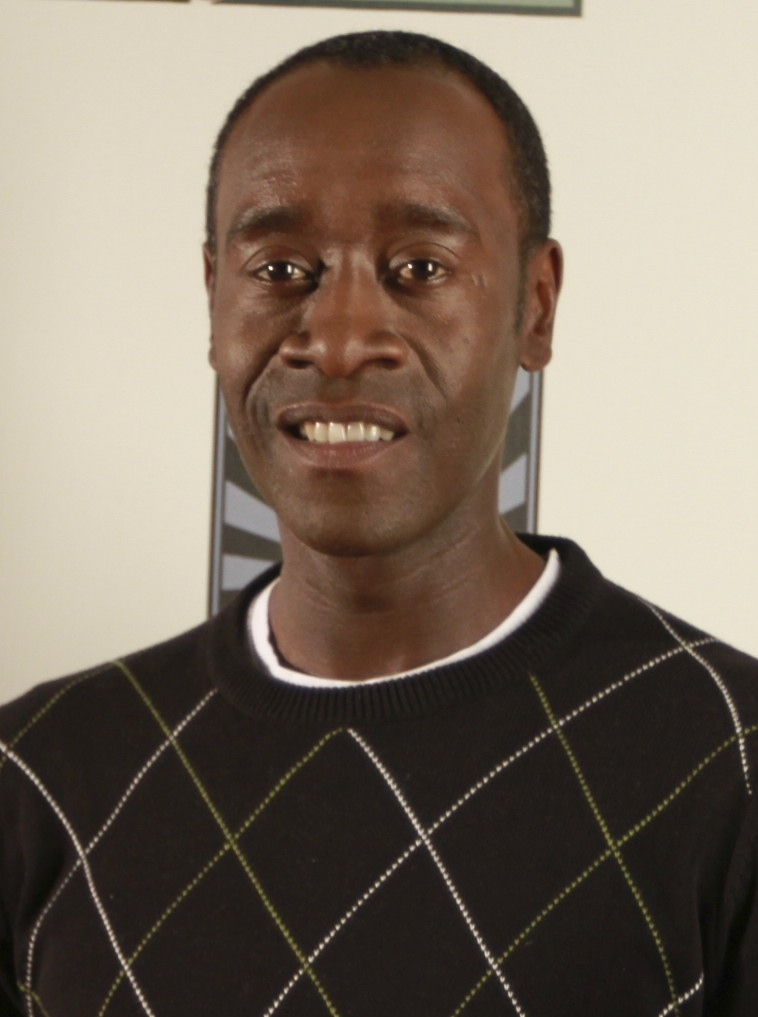
Don Cheadle — tied with Gregory Peck— Best Supporting Actor in a Series, Miniseries or Motion Picture co-winner

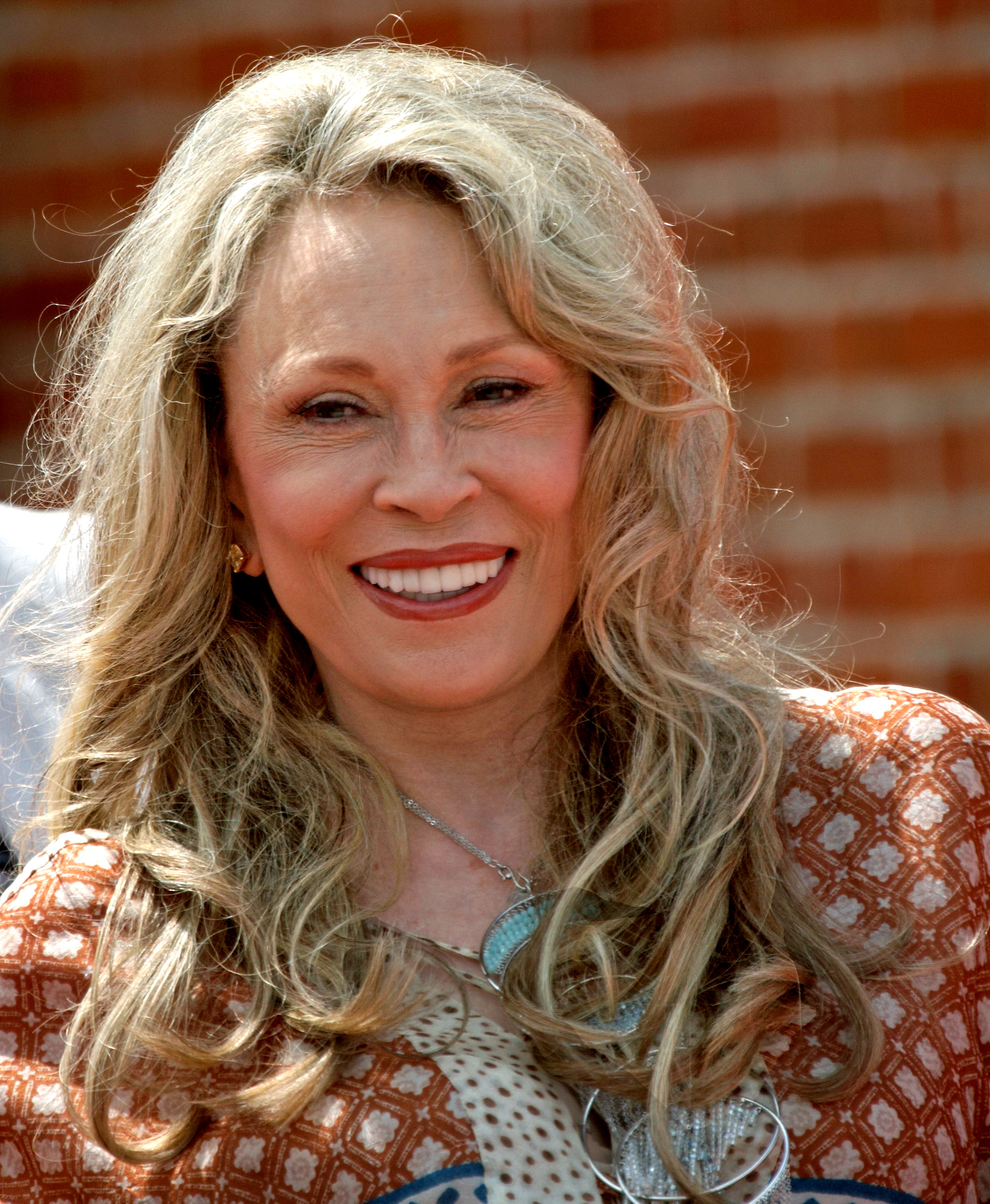
Faye Dunaway — tied with Camryn Manheim — Best Supporting Actress in a Series, Miniseries or Motion Picture Made for Television co-winner

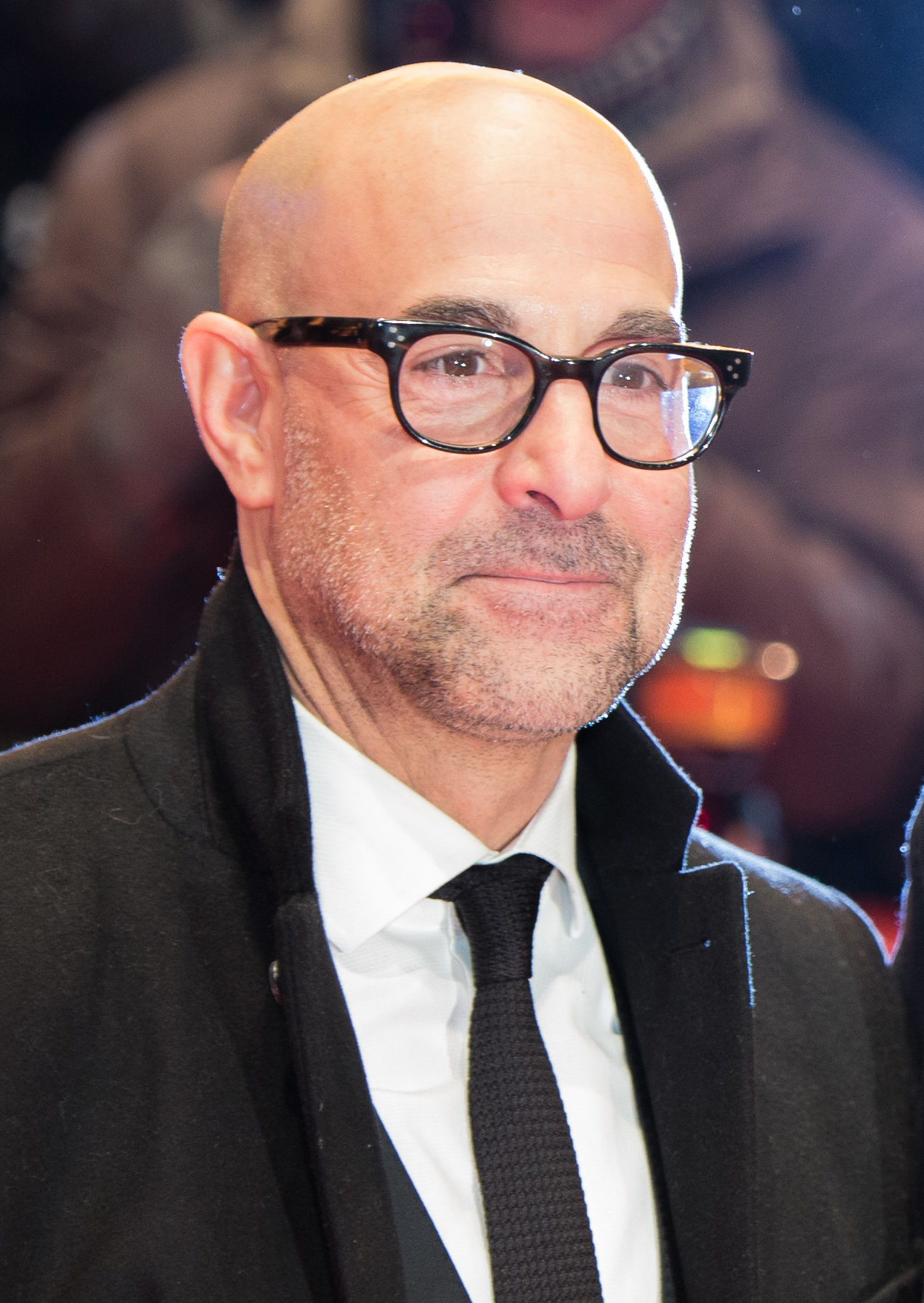
Stanley Tucci — Best Actor in a Miniseries or Television Film winner

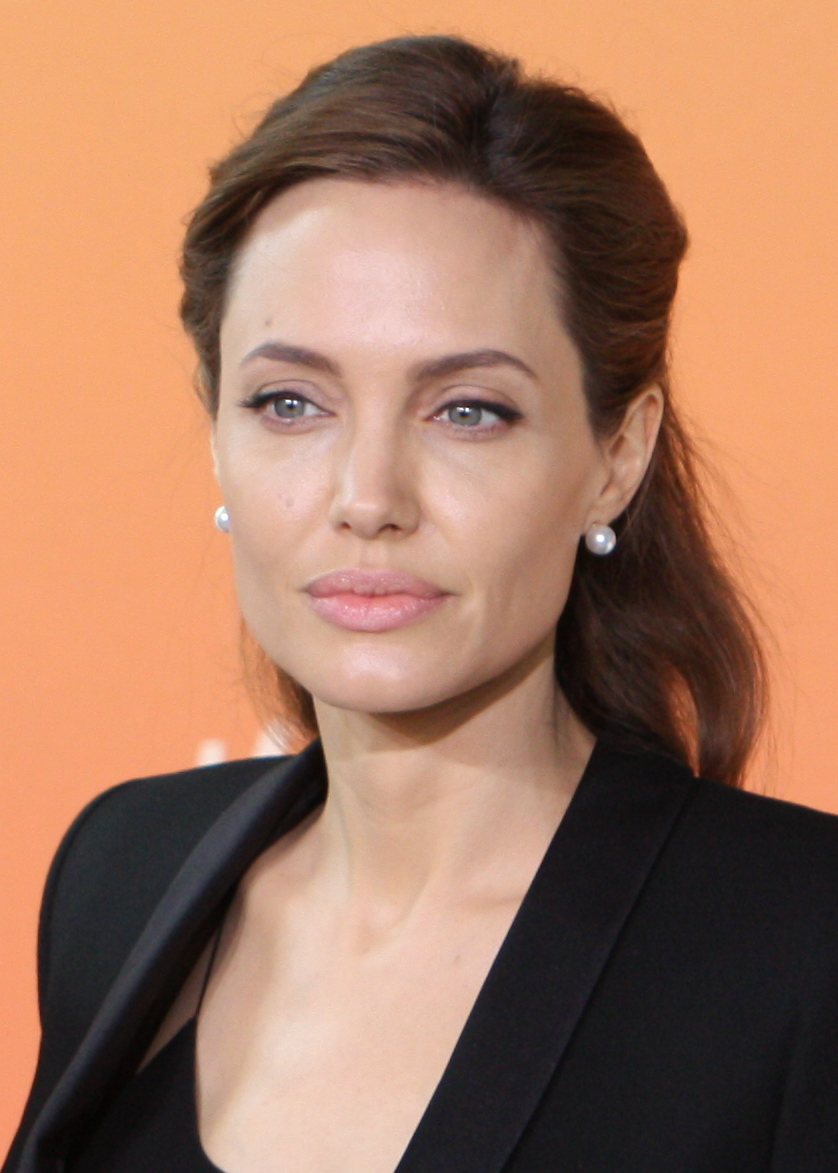
Angelina Jolie — Best Actress in a Miniseries or Television Movie winner

=== Film ===
Best Motion Picture
Drama	Musical or Comedy
Saving Private Ryan: Elizabeth; Gods and Monsters; The Horse Whisperer; The Truman Show	Shakespeare in Love: Bulworth; The Mask of Zorro; Patch Adams; Still Crazy; There's Something About Mary
Best Performance in a Motion Picture – Drama
Actor	Actress
Jim Carrey – The Truman Show as Truman Burbank: Stephen Fry – Wilde as Oscar Wilde; Tom Hanks – Saving Private Ryan as Captain John H. Miller; Ian McKellen – Gods and Monsters as James Whale; Nick Nolte – Affliction as Wade Whitehouse	Cate Blanchett – Elizabeth as Queen Elizabeth I: Fernanda Montenegro – Central Station (Central do Brasil) as Isadora "Dora" Teixeira; Susan Sarandon – Stepmom as Jackie Harrison; Meryl Streep – One True Thing as Kate Gulden; Emily Watson – Hilary and Jackie as Jacqueline "Jackie" du Pré
Best Performance in a Motion Picture – Musical or Comedy
Actor	Actress
Michael Caine – Little Voice as Ray Say: Antonio Banderas – The Mask of Zorro as Alejandro Murrieta / Zorro; Warren Beatty – Bulworth as Senator Jay Bulworth; John Travolta – Primary Colors as Governor Jack Stanton; Robin Williams – Patch Adams as Dr. Hunter "Patch" Adams	Gwyneth Paltrow – Shakespeare in Love as Viola de Lesseps: Cameron Diaz – There's Something About Mary as Mary Jensen; Jane Horrocks – Little Voice as Laura Hoff; Christina Ricci – The Opposite of Sex as Dede Truitt; Meg Ryan – You've Got Mail as Kathleen Kelly
Best Supporting Performance in a Motion Picture – Drama, Musical or Comedy
Supporting Actor	Supporting Actress
Ed Harris – The Truman Show as Christof: Robert Duvall – A Civil Action as Jerome "Jerry" Facher; Bill Murray – Rushmore as Herman Blume; Geoffrey Rush – Shakespeare in Love as Philip Henslowe; Donald Sutherland – Without Limits as Bill Bowerman; Billy Bob Thornton – A Simple Plan as Jacob Mitchell	Lynn Redgrave – Gods and Monsters as Hanna: Kathy Bates – Primary Colors as Libby Holden; Brenda Blethyn – Little Voice as Mari Hoff; Judi Dench – Shakespeare in Love as Queen Elizabeth I; Sharon Stone – The Mighty as Gwen Dillon
Best Director	Best Screenplay
Steven Spielberg – Saving Private Ryan: Shekhar Kapur – Elizabeth; John Madden – Shakespeare in Love; Robert Redford – The Horse Whisperer; Peter Weir – The Truman Show	Shakespeare in Love – Marc Norman and Tom Stoppard: Bulworth – Warren Beatty and Jeremy Pikser; Happiness – Todd Solondz; Saving Private Ryan – Robert Rodat; The Truman Show – Andrew Niccol
Best Original Score	Best Original Song
The Truman Show – Burkhard Dallwitz and Philip Glass: A Bug's Life – Randy Newman; Mulan – Jerry Goldsmith; The Prince of Egypt – Stephen Schwartz and Hans Zimmer; Saving Private Ryan – John Williams	"The Prayer" performed by Celine Dion & Andrea Bocelli – Quest for Camelot: "Reflection" performed by Christina Aguilera – Mulan; "The Mighty" performed by Sting – The Mighty; "Uninvited" performed by Alanis Morissette – City of Angels; "When You Believe" performed by Whitney Houston & Mariah Carey – The Prince of Egypt; "The Flame Still Burns" by Chris Difford, Marti Frederiksen and Mick Jones – Still Crazy
Best Foreign Language Film	
Central Station (Central do Brasil) • Brazil: The Celebration (Festen) • Denmark; Men with Guns (Hombres armados) • United States; The Polish Bride (De Poolse bruid) • Netherlands; Tango • Argentina	

The following films received multiple nominations:

Nominations	Title
6	Shakespeare in Love
6	The Truman Show
5	Saving Private Ryan
3	Bulworth
3	Elizabeth
3	Gods and Monsters
3	Little Voice
2	Central Station (Central do Brasil)
2	The Horse Whisperer
2	The Mask of Zorro
2	The Mighty
2	Mulan
2	Patch Adams
2	The Prince of Egypt
2	There's Something About Mary
2	Still Crazy

The following films received multiple wins:

Wins	Film
3	Shakespeare in Love
3	The Truman Show
2	Saving Private Ryan

=== Television ===
Best Television Series
Drama Series	Comedy or Musical Series
The Practice: ER; Felicity; Law & Order; The X-Files	Ally McBeal: Dharma & Greg; Frasier; Just Shoot Me!; Spin City
Best Lead Actor in a Television Series
Best Actor - Drama Series	Best Actor - Comedy or Musical Series
Dylan McDermott – The Practice: David Duchovny – The X-Files; Anthony Edwards – ER; Lance Henriksen – Millennium; Jimmy Smits – NYPD Blue	Michael J. Fox – Spin City: Thomas Gibson – Dharma & Greg; Kelsey Grammer – Frasier; John Lithgow – 3rd Rock from the Sun; George Segal – Just Shoot Me!
Best Lead Actress in a Television Series
Best Actress - Drama Series	Best Actress - Comedy or Musical Series
Keri Russell – Felicity: Gillian Anderson – The X-Files; Kim Delaney – NYPD Blue; Roma Downey – Touched by an Angel; Julianna Margulies – ER	Jenna Elfman – Dharma & Greg: Christina Applegate – Jesse; Calista Flockhart – Ally McBeal; Laura San Giacomo – Just Shoot Me!; Sarah Jessica Parker – Sex and the City
Best Supporting Performance - Series, Miniseries or Television Film
Best Supporting Actor - Series, Miniseries or Television Film	Best Supporting Actress - Series, Miniseries or Television Film
Don Cheadle – The Rat Pack Gregory Peck – Moby Dick: Joe Mantegna – The Rat Pack; David Spade – Just Shoot Me!; Noah Wyle – ER	Faye Dunaway – Gia Camryn Manheim – The Practice: Helena Bonham Carter – Merlin; Jane Krakowski – Ally McBeal; Wendie Malick – Just Shoot Me!; Susan Sullivan – Dharma & Greg
Best Actor - Miniseries or Television Film	Best Actress - Miniseries or Television Film
Stanley Tucci – Winchell: Peter Fonda – The Tempest; Sam Neill – Merlin; Bill Paxton – A Bright Shining Lie; Christopher Reeve – Rear Window; Patrick Stewart – Moby Dick	Angelina Jolie – Gia: Stockard Channing – The Baby Dance; Laura Dern – The Baby Dance; Ann-Margret – Life of the Party: The Pamela Harriman Story; Miranda Richardson – Merlin
Best Miniseries or Television Film	
From the Earth to the Moon: The Baby Dance; Gia; Merlin; The Temptations	

The following programs received multiple nominations:

Nominations	Title
5	Just Shoot Me!
4	Dharma & Greg
4	ER
4	Merlin
3	Ally McBeal
3	The Baby Dance
3	Gia
3	The Practice
3	The X-Files
2	Felicity
2	Frasier
2	Moby Dick
2	NYPD Blue
2	The Rat Pack
2	Spin City

The following programs received multiple awards:

Wins	Series
2	The Practice
2	Gia

== Ceremony ==
=== Presenters ===
- Ben Affleck
- Lauren Bacall
- Kim Basinger
- Warren Beatty
- Roberto Benigni
- Annette Bening
- Sean Connery
- Jamie Lee Curtis
- Matt Damon
- Anthony Edwards
- Calista Flockhart
- Peter Fonda
- Jodie Foster
- Michael J. Fox
- Brendan Fraser
- Melanie Griffith
- Holly Hunter
- Jeremy Irons
- Christine Lahti
- Jane Leeves
- George Lucas
- Bill Paxton
- Kelly Preston
- Freddie Prinze, Jr.
- Ving Rhames
- Tim Robbins
- Rick Schroder
- Tom Selleck
- Jane Seymour
- Ben Stiller
- Sharon Stone
- Gloria Stuart
- Charlize Theron
- John Travolta
- Alfre Woodard

=== Cecil B. DeMille Award ===
Jack Nicholson

== Awards breakdown ==
The following networks received multiple nominations:

Nominations	Network
20	NBC
12	ABC
9	HBO
7	Fox
3	Showtime
2	USA
2	The WB

The following networks received multiple wins:

Wins	Network
2	ABC
2	HBO

== See also ==
- 71st Academy Awards
- 19th Golden Raspberry Awards
- 5th Screen Actors Guild Awards
- 50th Primetime Emmy Awards
- 51st Primetime Emmy Awards
- 52nd British Academy Film Awards
- 53rd Tony Awards
- 1998 in film
- 1998 in American television
