= All the Empty Rooms =

2025 documentary short film by Joshua Seftel

- Directed by: Joshua Seftel
- Produced by: Joshua Seftel; Conall Jones; James Costa; Trevor Burgess; Steve Kerr
- Cinematography: Matt Porwoll
- Edited by: Erin Casper; Stephen Maing; Jeremy Medoff
- Music by: Alex Somers
- Production companies: Smartypants; Artemis Rising Foundation; Hyperobject Industries
- Distributed by: Netflix
- Release dates: August 31, 2025 (Telluride); December 1, 2025 (Netflix)
- Running time: 33 minutes
- Country: United States
- Language: English

All the Empty Rooms is a 2025 American documentary short film directed and produced by Joshua Seftel. It follows Steve Hartman and photographer Lou Bopp as they embark across the United States to memorialize the bedrooms of children killed in school shootings.

All the Empty Rooms had its world premiere at the 52nd Telluride Film Festival on August 31, 2025. Netflix released it globally on its streaming service on December 1. At the 98th Academy Awards, it was awarded the Best Documentary Short Film.

== Premise ==
Steve Hartman and photographer Lou Bopp embark across the United States to memorialize the untouched bedrooms of children lost to school shootings.

Four children and their bedrooms were featured in the film:

- Hallie Scruggs, a victim of the 2023 Nashville school shooting in Nashville, Tennessee
- Dominic Blackwell, a victim of the Saugus High School shooting in Santa Clarita, California
- Gracie Anne Muehlberger, also a victim of the Saugus High School shooting
- Jacklyn Jaylen Cazares, a victim of the Uvalde school shooting in Uvalde, Texas

The full project included four additional children who were not shown in the film. These included three victims of the Parkland high school shooting and one victim of the Sandy Hook Elementary School shooting.

== Release ==
It had its world premiere at the 52nd Telluride Film Festival on August 31, 2025. It also screened at the 2025 Toronto International Film Festival on September 10, 2025. Prior to its Telluride premiere, Netflix acquired distribution rights to the film.

== Accolades ==
Award	Date of ceremony	Category	Recipient(s)	Result	Ref.
Academy Awards	March 15, 2026	Best Documentary Short Film	All the Empty Rooms	Won	
Hamptons International Film Festival	October 13, 2025	Subject Matter Award	All the Empty Rooms	Won	

== See also ==
- Academy Award for Best Documentary Short Film
- Submissions for Best Documentary Short Academy Award
