= Michael Lesslie =

British playwright and screenwriter (born 1983)

Michael Lesslie (born 11 November 1984) is a British playwright, screenwriter and producer.

== Life and career ==
He studied English Language and Literature at Exeter College, Oxford, where he received a double first. His debut short film, Heavy Metal Drummer, was nominated for a BAFTA Award.

=== Theatre ===
In 2005 he wrote a stage adaptation of The Constant Prince, which performed at the Oxford Playhouse and London Arcola. In 2007 he adapted the film Swimming With Sharks for the stage. It opened at the Vaudeville Theatre, making Michael then the youngest person ever to have opened a new play straight into the West End. His play Prince of Denmark, a Hamlet prequel, was premiered in 2011 by the National Youth Theatre at the Royal National Theatre in London. It was subsequently performed at the Ambassadors Theatre in the West End.

=== Film ===
In 2015 Lesslie adapted William Shakespeare's Macbeth, rewriting a script by Todd Louiso and Jacob Koskoff. The film was directed by Justin Kurzel and starred Michael Fassbender and Marion Cotillard. It played in official competition at the Cannes Film Festival and received a 10 minute standing ovation.

He wrote the original script for the Assassin's Creed film adaptation in 2016, which was then rewritten by Adam Cooper and Bill Collage and others.

In 2017, a film adaptation of Shakespeare's Hamlet, written by Lesslie and starring Riz Ahmed was announced. Hamlet, which Ahmed and Lesslie also produced, had its world premiere at the 52nd Telluride Film Festival on August 30, 2025, and also screened at the 2025 Toronto International Film Festival on September 5, 2025.

In 2023 he co-wrote the adaptation of Suzanne Collins' novel The Hunger Games: The Ballad of Songbirds & Snakes, directed by Francis Lawrence.

On May 2, 2024, The Hollywood Reporter announced him as one of the writers of Now You See Me: Now You Don't. It was released in November 2025.

On May 21, 2024, Deadline Hollywood reported that Lesslie had been set by Marvel Studios to write the upcoming reboot of the X-Men film franchise, now set in the Marvel Cinematic Universe.

On March 20, 2026, Lesslie was hired to write the screenplay for Fast Forever.

=== Television ===
In 2018 he served as lead writer and executive producer on John Le Carre's The Little Drummer Girl. The TV series starred Florence Pugh, Michael Shannon, Alexander Skarsgard and Charles Dance, and was directed by Park Chan-Wook. In 2025 he was an executive producer for Dope Girls, also for the BBC.

=== Producing ===
Lesslie founded Storyteller Productions with producer PJ van Sandwijk. The company’s films for which he has acted as producer or executive producer include the features Thirteen Lives, directed by Ron Howard and Locked Down, directed by Doug Liman.

He has also acted as executive producer on the documentary films The Rescue, Pigeon Tunnel and Citizen K. Michael won an Emmy for his role as executive producer on The Rescue.

== Filmography ==
=== Writer ===
Short film

- Heavy Metal Drummer (2005)
- Airlock, or How to Say Goodbye in Space (2007)
- Skirt (2012)
- Eleanor (2015)

Feature film

- Macbeth (2015)
- Assassin's Creed (2016)
- The Hunger Games: The Ballad of Songbirds & Snakes (2023)
- Hamlet (2025)
- Now You See Me: Now You Don't (2025)
- The Hunger Games: Sunrise on the Reaping (2026)
- Fast Forever (2028)

TV series

- The Little Drummer Girl (2018) (4 episodes, also creator)

=== Producer ===
Feature Film

- Locked Down (2021)
- Thirteen Lives (2021)
- Hamlet (2025)

TV series

- The Little Drummer Girl (2018)
- Dope Girls (2025)

Documentary film

- American Dharma (2018)
- Citizen K (2019)
- The Rescue (2022)
- The Pigeon Tunnel (2023)
