= Los Angeles Film Critics Association Award for Best Screenplay =

Annual US film award

The Los Angeles Film Critics Association Award for Best Screenplay is one of the annual film awards given by the Los Angeles Film Critics Association.

== Winners ==
=== 1970s ===
Year	Winner	Writer(s)
1975	Nashville	Joan Tewkesbury
1976	Network	Paddy Chayefsky
1977	Annie Hall	Woody Allen and Marshall Brickman
1978	An Unmarried Woman	Paul Mazursky
1979	Kramer vs. Kramer	Robert Benton

=== 1980s ===
Year	Winner	Writer(s)
1980	Return of the Secaucus 7	John Sayles
1981	Atlantic City	John Guare
1982	Tootsie	Larry Gelbart and Murray Schisgal
1983	Terms of Endearment	James L. Brooks
1984	Amadeus	Peter Shaffer
1985	Brazil	Terry Gilliam, Charles McKeown, and Tom Stoppard
1986	Hannah and Her Sisters	Woody Allen
1987	Hope and Glory	John Boorman
1988	Bull Durham	Ron Shelton
1989	Drugstore Cowboy	Gus Van Sant and Daniel Yost

=== 1990s ===
Year	Winner	Writer(s)
1990	Reversal of Fortune	Nicholas Kazan
1991	Bugsy	James Toback
1992	Unforgiven	David Webb Peoples
1993	The Piano	Jane Campion
1994	Pulp Fiction	Quentin Tarantino and Roger Avary
1995	Sense and Sensibility	Emma Thompson
1996	Fargo	Joel Coen and Ethan Coen
1997	L.A. Confidential	Curtis Hanson and Brian Helgeland
1998	Bulworth	Warren Beatty and Jeremy Pikser
1999	Being John Malkovich	Charlie Kaufman

=== 2000s ===
Year	Winner(s)	Writer(s)
2000	You Can Count on Me	Kenneth Lonergan
2001	Memento	Christopher Nolan
2002	About Schmidt	Alexander Payne and Jim Taylor
2003	American Splendor	Shari Springer Berman and Robert Pulcini
2004	Sideways	Alexander Payne and Jim Taylor
2005	Capote	Dan Futterman
2005	The Squid and the Whale	Noah Baumbach
2006	The Queen	Peter Morgan
2007	The Savages	Tamara Jenkins
2008	Happy-Go-Lucky	Mike Leigh
2009	Up in the Air	Jason Reitman and Sheldon Turner

=== 2010s ===
Year	Winner	Writer(s)
2010	The Social Network	Aaron Sorkin
2011	A Separation (Jodái-e Náder az Simin)	Asghar Farhadi
2012	Argo	Chris Terrio
2013	Before Midnight	Richard Linklater, Ethan Hawke, and Julie Delpy
2014	The Grand Budapest Hotel	Wes Anderson
2015	Spotlight	Tom McCarthy and Josh Singer
2016	The Lobster	Yorgos Lanthimos and Efthymis Filippou
2017	Get Out	Jordan Peele
2018	Can You Ever Forgive Me?	Nicole Holofcener and Jeff Whitty
2019	Marriage Story	Noah Baumbach

=== 2020s ===
Year	Winner	Writer(s)
2020	Promising Young Woman	Emerald Fennell
2021	Drive My Car	Ryusuke Hamaguchi and Takamasa Oe
2022	TÁR	Todd Field
2023	All of Us Strangers	Andrew Haigh
2024	A Real Pain	Jesse Eisenberg
2025	It Was Just an Accident	Jafar Panahi

== See also ==
- Academy Award for Best Adapted Screenplay
- Academy Award for Best Original Screenplay
