= Lost in the Jungle =

2025 film soundtrack album

- Film poster
- Directed by: Jimmy Chin; Elizabeth Chai Vasarhelyi; Juan Camilo Cruz
- Produced by: Elizabeth Chai Vasarhelyi; Jimmy Chin; Juan Camilo Cruz; Mark Grieco; Anna Barnes; Simon Chinn; Jonathan Chinn; Guillermo Galdos
- Cinematography: Max Preiss
- Edited by: Deborah Dickson; Flavia De Souza
- Music by: Claudia Sarne
- Production companies: National Geographic Documentary Films; Little Monster Films; Lightbox
- Distributed by: National Geographic Documentary Films
- Release dates: August 30, 2025 (Telluride); September 12, 2025 (United States)
- Country: United States
- Language: English

Lost in the Jungle is a 2025 American documentary television film about four siblings who survived 40 days in the Colombian jungle after a plane crash. It is directed by Jimmy Chin, Elizabeth Chai Vasarhelyi and Juan Camilo Cruz.

It premiered at the 52nd Telluride Film Festival, and aired in the United States on National Geographic on September 12, 2025.

== Production ==
The film was originally announced in May 2024, with the working title Lost in the Amazon.

== Reception ==
On review aggregator website Rotten Tomatoes, the film holds an approval rating of 92% based on 13 reviews, with an average rating of 7.5/10.
