= Summer Tour (film) =

- Theatrical release poster
- Directed by: Mischa Richter
- Produced by: Mickey Liddell; Pete Shilaimon; Chloë Sevigny; Evelina Kirgan; Lizzie Nastro
- Cinematography: Hayden Mason
- Production company: LD Entertainment
- Distributed by: Utopia
- Release dates: August 30, 2025 (Telluride); July 23, 2026 (United States)
- Running time: 82 minutes
- Country: United States

Summer Tour is 2025 American documentary film which explores members of the Deadhead community as they follow Dead & Company on its final tour in 2023. It was directed by Mischa Richter and produced by Chloë Sevigny and LD Entertainment. It premiered at the 2025 Telluride Film Festival. In February 2026, Utopia acquired the distribution rights to the film, and released it on July 23, 2026.
