= Steve Hartman =

American broadcast journalist

- Born: April 13, 1963 (age 63); Toledo, Ohio, U.S.
- Education: Bowling Green State University (BA)
- Occupations: Journalist; news presenter; reporter and correspondent
- Years active: 1987–present
- Notable credits: WTOL assignment reporter (1984–1987); KSTP feature reporter (1987–1991); WABC-TV feature reporter (1991–1994); KCBS-TV feature reporter (1994–1998); CBS News reporter (1996–present); 60 Minutes II essayist (2002–2005)
- Spouse: Andrea
- Children: 3

Stephen Robert Hartman (born April 14, 1963) is an American broadcast journalist. Hartman earned a degree in broadcast journalism at Bowling Green State University, graduating in 1985. He is best known for his coverage of human interest stories with CBS Evening News, including Everybody Has A Story and On the Road.

== Career ==
From 1984–87, he served as an intern and general assignment reporter for WTOL in Toledo, Ohio. From 1987 to 1991, he was a feature reporter for KSTP in Minneapolis and held the same post at WABC-TV in New York City from 1991–94. From 1994 to 1998, he served as a feature reporter for KCBS-TV in Los Angeles, and hosted a segment called "The Stevening News". Hartman was also a correspondent for two CBS News magazines, Coast to Coast (1996–97) and Public Eye with Bryant Gumbel (1997–98). In 1998, Hartman became a full-time CBS News correspondent; he served as 60 Minutes II essayist from 2002 until the show was canceled in September 2005.

In 2025, Hartman was the subject of All the Empty Rooms directed by Joshua Seftel for Netflix, following Hartman and photographer Lou Bopp as they embarked across the United States memorializing the childhood bedrooms of those lost to school shootings. The documentary won an Oscar for best documentary, short subject

=== Everybody Has a Story ===
Hartman became well known for his award-winning feature series Everybody Has a Story. Hartman got the idea from newspaper reporter David Johnson of the Lewiston [Idaho] Morning Tribune. He first tried a few stories on Public Eye. Hartman would toss a dart over his shoulder at a map of the United States, and then travel to wherever the dart landed. Upon arrival, Hartman would find a phonebook and, choosing a name at random, would try to find a person who would agree to be interviewed and tell their "story". Hartman traveled around the country, from Hawaii to Alaska, from Buckhannon, West Virginia, to Miami, Florida. From its inception in 1998, the series produced 123 stories.

In 2010, Hartman took the series worldwide when, with assistance of NASA, each "Everybody in the World Has a Story" segment featured an astronaut in the International Space Station spinning a globe and pointing to random locations for Hartman to travel and find a story.

=== On the Road ===
Hartman's "Assignment America" reports were part of the CBS Evening News with Katie Couric; they were inspired by Charles Kuralt's On the Road series, which originally aired on CBS from 1967 to 1980. In 2011, CBS revived On the Road, with Hartman providing the Friday evening end-pieces for the CBS Evening News with Scott Pelley. The series won two 2013 Edward R. Murrow Awards (presented by the Radio Television Digital News Association) for the CBS Evening News. Three of Hartman's stories won in the Best Writing category.

=== Kindness 101 ===
Hartman has been featuring Kindness 101, stories about goodness, kindness, and compassion, appearing on CBS Evening News.

== Personal life ==
Hartman lives with his wife, Andrea, and his three children in Catskill, New York. Two of the children, Meryl and Emmett, feature with Hartman in Kindness 101. One of his children has autism. Hartman is an Eagle Scout.

== Awards ==
In 2002 Hartman received an Alfred I. DuPont-Columbia University Award from the Columbia Journalism School for the Everybody has a Story series.

He received four Edward R. Murrow Awards from the Radio Television Digital News Association (RTDNA), including three consecutive citations for Best Writing. In 2011, he was awarded an Emmy for Outstanding Feature Story in a Newscast from the Academy of Television Arts and Sciences.
