= Classroom 4 =

2025 American short documentary film

- Promotional poster
- Directed by: Eden Wurmfeld
- Produced by: Yael Bridge; Eden Wurmfeld
- Starring: Reiko Hillyer
- Cinematography: Sean Conley
- Edited by: Lawrence Lerew
- Production company: Eden Wurmfeld Films
- Distributed by: PBS
- Release date: April 2, 2025 (Aspen Shortsfest)
- Running time: 39 minutes
- Country: United States
- Language: English

Classroom 4 is a 2025 American documentary short film, directed and produced by Eden Wurmfeld. The film follows a course taught inside a prison, involving students from nearby Lewis & Clark College and incarcerated students, about the United States' history of crime and punishment.

It was shortlisted for the Best Documentary Short Film at the 98th Academy Awards.

== Synopsis ==
Classroom 4 follows an award-winning history professor Reiko Hillyer who teaches a course called The History of Crime and Punishment in the United States to a mixed group of students—some incarcerated and some from the outside. The film traces how the class examines themes such as masculinity, prison abolition, and mercy. Through these discussions, it highlights how people in prison are often overlooked, shows the wider impact of mass incarceration, and underscores the value of educational programs that bring incarcerated and free students together.

== Cast ==
- Reiko Hillyer

== Production ==
The film was shot at the Columbia River Correctional Institution under Oregon Department of Corrections in Portland, Oregon, United States.

== Release ==
The film had its world premiere in the 34th Edition Shortsfest: Program 4 at the Aspen Shortsfest on April 2, 2025, where it won Jury Award for Documentary.

It had its East Coast Premiere in Short program 'What These Walls Hold' at the DC/DOX on June 15, 2025.

The film opened the LA Shorts Fest on July 16, 2025, in Program 1.

It was screened in Better Together shorts program at the Indy Shorts International Film Festival on July 27, 2025.

It was presented as part of Shorts Program: 2025 Conflict and Resolution Shorts at the Hamptons International Film Festival on October 10, 2025.

The film had its Hudson Valley Premiere at the Woodstock Film Festival on October 19, 2025.

On November 17, 2025, it was screened in the Short List: Shorts – Becoming at Doc NYC along with other two films.

It premiered on November 25, 2025, on PBS and is available for streaming. The film is also part of the POV Shorts Season 8.

== Accolades ==
| Award | Date of ceremony | Category | Recipient(s) | Result | Ref. |
|---|---|---|---|---|---|
| Aspen Shortsfest | April 5, 2025 | Jury Award for Documentary | Classroom 4 | Won | |
| LA Shorts Fest | July 28, 2025 | Best Documentary | Classroom 4 | Won | |
| Critics' Choice Documentary Awards | November 9, 2025 | Best Short Documentary | Classroom 4 | Nominated | |

== See also ==
- Academy Award for Best Documentary Short Film
- Submissions for Best Documentary Short Academy Award
