= Stranger at the Gate =

2022 short documentary film by Joshua Seftel

- Official poster
- Directed by: Joshua Seftel
- Produced by: Suzanne Hillinger; Conall Jones; Joshua Seftel
- Starring: Bibi Bahrami; Saber Bahrami
- Narrated by: Emily McKinney
- Edited by: Jeremy Medoff
- Music by: Ezinma
- Production company: Smartypants
- Distributed by: The New Yorker
- Release date: September 14, 2022
- Running time: 29 minutes
- Country: United States
- Language: English

Stranger at the Gate is a 2022 American short documentary film directed by Joshua Seftel. The documentary is about an Afghan refugee named Bibi Bahrami and the members of her little Indiana mosque, who come face to face with Richard "Mac" McKinney, a U.S. Marine who has secret plans to bomb their community center. But Mac McKinney's plan takes an unexpected turn. Produced by Smartypants, the film had its world premiere on September 14, 2022 via YouTube and The New Yorker.

It was nominated for the Academy Award for Best Documentary Short Film at the 95th Academy Awards.

== Synopsis ==
The short documentary film tells the story of Richard (Mac) McKinney, a Marine veteran from Indiana, who served in Iraq and Afghanistan. After his return he coped with PTSD, and developed Islamophobia. He plans an attack on a local mosque, but, things turned out differently when he spends time with community that welcomes him.

== Cast ==
- Bibi Bahrami - Afghan refugee
- Dr. Saber Bahrami
- Zaki Bahrami
- Captain Kent Kurtz
- Dana McKinney
- Emily McKinney - McKinney's daughter
- Richard "Mac" McKinney, a former Marine from Indiana
- Jomo Williams

== Production ==
The director in a statement in a question answer session told that he had read Richard “Mac” McKinney’s story in a small, Indiana newspaper a few years back, which was told from Mac’s vantage point. He said, "I had always wondered what it would be like to hear this story from the perspective of the congregants of the Islamic Center that McKinney planned to bomb, and to hear from McKinney’s wife and daughter about what it was like to live with a domestic terrorist." In August 2021, he and his team went to Muncie, Indiana to meet and film the congregants of the Islamic Center and Mac’s family. The story, they told from their perspective, and we filmed it.

== Release ==
The film had its world premiere on September 14, 2022 via YouTube and The New Yorker. Prior to that, it was screened at Sarasota Film Festival in April 2022, and at Tribeca Festival held from June 8 to 19, 2022. In September 2022, it was screened at Port Townsend Film Festival held from September 22 to September 25, 2022, and Breck Film Festival held from September 15 to September 18, 2022. On October 7, 2022, it was screened at BendFilm Festival held from October 6 to October 9, 2022, as well as at Hamptons International Film Festival held from October 7 to October 16, 2022 in East Hampton, New York

== Reception ==
The film featured in American weekly magazine The New Yorker. Jennie Kermode reviewing for Eye for Film rated the film with 4 stars out of 5 and opined that, "Joshua Seftel’s short documentary is a powerful piece of work". Concluding, Kermode stated, "Told in a style which avoids sensationalism and lets events speak for themselves, Stranger At The Gate is a quietly revolutionary film. It's a celebration of diversity both within our communities and within the stories which we tell." Greggory Morris reviewing for the WORD rated the film with 5 out of 5 and wrote, "exceptionally made, spellbinding documentary features telling vignettes". Concluding, Morris stated, "One of the sublime features adding to this film’s beatific sheen are the interviewees whose vignettes about their lives, experiences as well as interactions with each other are fused into a sweeping cinematic tapestry." Jason Knight reviewing for the UK Film Review rated the film with 4 out of 5 stars and wrote, "This half-hour-long documentary provides a memorable insight into an astonishing story". Knight praised score and editing writing, "The tense and dramatic score by Ezinma is great", he added, "Jeremy Medoff and Eric Daniel Metzgar worked on the editing and did a fine job." Concluding, Knight stated, "The experience of viewing this encourages the idea that one must turn their back on hatred and violence and reveals the importance and joy of embracing good."

== Accolades ==
Award	Date of ceremony	Category	Recipient(s)	Result	Ref.
Tribeca Festival	16 June 2022	Special Jury Mention for Best Documentary Short	Stranger at the Gate	Won	
Indy Shorts International Film Festival	24 July 2022	Grand Prize, Documentary	Stranger at the Gate	Won	
Breckenridge Film Festival	18 September 2022	Best Editing	Jeremy Medoff	Won	
Virginia Film Festival	7 November 2022	Audience Award Documentary Short Film	Stranger at the Gate	Won	
Critics' Choice Documentary Awards	12 November 2022	Best Documentary Short Film	Stranger at the Gate	Nominated	
Academy Awards	12 March 2023	Best Documentary Short Film	Stranger at the Gate	Nominated	

=== Other awards ===
- 2022 El-Hibri Foundation Peace Award: Joshua Seftel - Fearless Ally Award.
