= The New Yorker at 100 =

- Directed by: Marshall Curry
- Produced by: Marshall Curry; Elizabeth Martin; Xan Parker
- Narrated by: Julianne Moore
- Edited by: Penelope Falk; Zachary Stuart-Pontier
- Music by: H. Scott Salinas
- Distributed by: Netflix
- Release date: August 30, 2025 (TFF)
- Running time: 97 minutes
- Country: United States
- Language: English

The New Yorker at 100 is a 2025 American documentary film that explores the history of The New Yorker magazine, which celebrates its 100th year of publication in 2025. It is produced and directed by Marshall Curry. Judd Apatow is one of the executive producers. It premiered at the 52nd Telluride Film Festival in August 2025.

== Reception ==
On the review aggregator website Rotten Tomatoes, 69% of 16 critics' reviews are positive, with an average rating of 6.9/10.

Owen Gleiberman of Variety wrote, "In just 96 minutes, it captures The New Yorker's history, its influence, its daily mode of operation, and its mystique of serious delight... If you're a fan of The New Yorker and want a backstage tour of how the supremely refined sausage gets made, The New Yorker at 100 draws back the curtain in an enchanting way." Gleiberman selected it as one of the 25 best documentaries of the year.

Daniel Fienberg of The Hollywood Reporter wrote that the "Netflix doc is entertaining and star-studded, but the storied magazine deserved more depth."
