= Joshua Seftel =

American film director (born 1968)

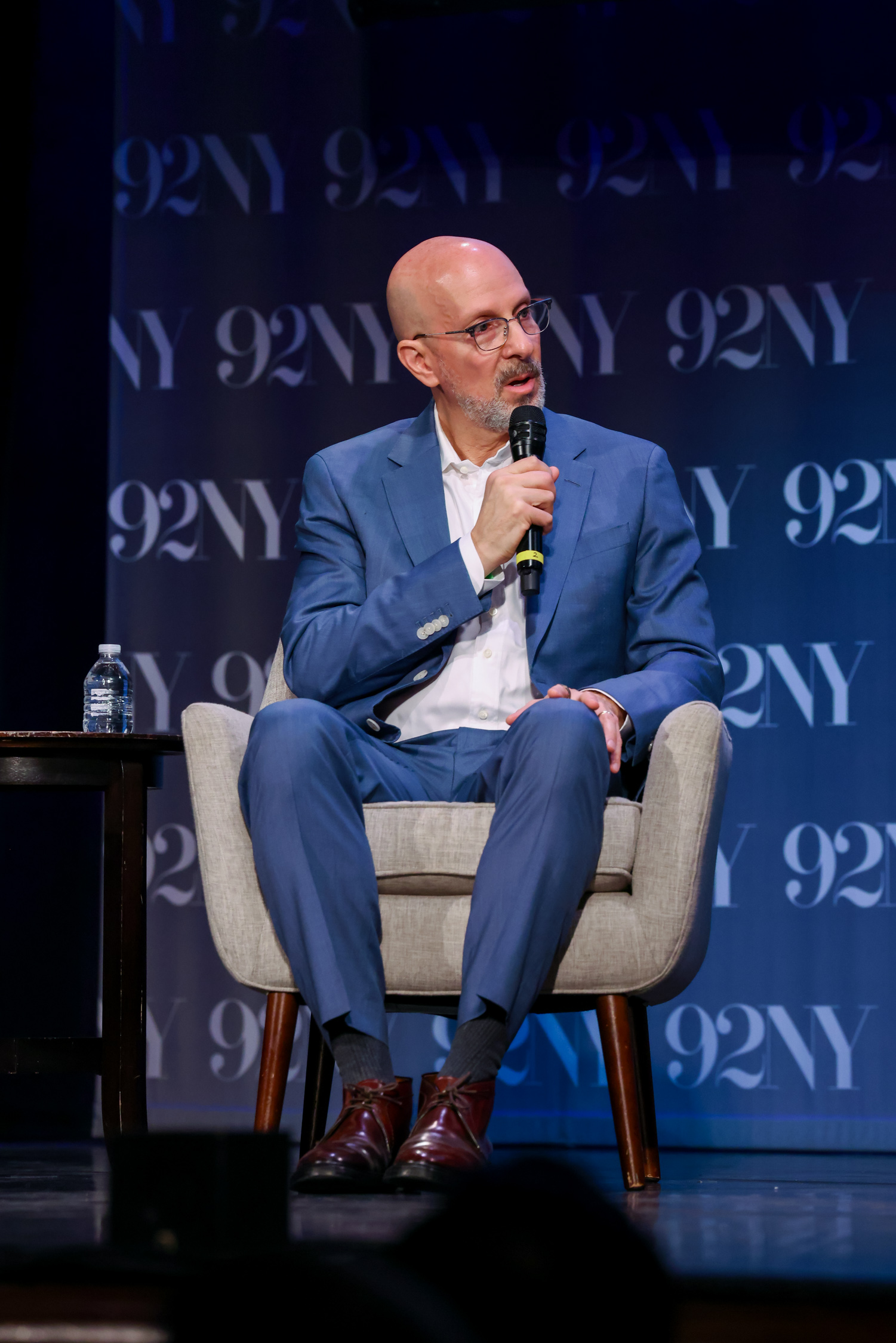
- Joshua Seftel at 92NY in December 2025.
- Born: July 17, 1968 (age 58); Schenectady, New York, US
- Occupations: Director, producer, screenwriter
- Years active: 1992–present
- Spouse: Erika Frankel

Joshua Seftel (born July 17, 1968) is an American film director. Seftel began his career in documentaries at age 22 with his Emmy-nominated film, Lost and Found, about Romania's orphaned children. He followed this with several films including Stranger at the Gate, an Oscar-nominated short documentary executively produced by Nobel Peace Prize laureate Malala Yousafzai. His political campaign film Taking on the Kennedys was selected by Time Magazine as one of the “ten best of the year." Seftel also directed the underdog sports film The Home Team which premiered at SXSW, and a film about the Broadway revival of the musical Annie, It's the Hard Knock Life. In 2026, Seftel’s film, All the Empty Rooms, won the 2025 Academy Award for Best Documentary Short Film.

== Early life ==
Born in Schenectady, New York, Seftel graduated from Tufts University in the class of 1990 with a Bachelor of Arts in French Literature and having completed the required coursework in pre-medical sciences. During his time at Tufts University, he studied abroad in Paris, France at Wesleyan University in Paris as a student of French literature and history in 1988. He later attended Columbia University’s National Arts Journalism Program (NAJP) in New York City as a mid-career fellow in 2002-2003. He is Jewish.

== Career ==
=== Documentary films ===
Seftel began his career in documentaries at age 22, receiving a National Emmy Nomination for his first film, Lost and Found: the Story of Romania's Forgotten Children, a documentary about the plight of Romania's 120,000 orphaned and abandoned children. Seftel lived in orphanages for several weeks while shooting the film.

Old Warrior, (1994) Seftel's next film, is a documentary about the forgotten history of the Senior Citizens Power Movement and its founder, Frank J. Manning and received the Gold Plaque at the Chicago International Film Festival and was broadcast on Public TV.

In 1996, Seftel produced Taking on the Kennedys for the PBS series P.O.V. which followed the campaign of Republican Party candidate Kevin Vigilante as he challenged Patrick J. Kennedy for a U.S. Congressional seat in Rhode Island. Taking on the Kennedys was named on TIME's list "The Best Television of 1996" and has been anthologized in P.O.V.’s 20th Anniversary Collection DVD set.

Seftel's next film was Ennis’ Gift, an HBO documentary released in 2002 about learning differences, produced with Bill Cosby and wife Camille Hanks in memory of their late son Ennis, which featured Danny Glover, James Earl Jones, Anne Bancroft, Robert Rauschenberg, Charles Schwab and Caitlyn Jenner. It received the 2002 Literacy in Media Award from the Literacy Network of Greater Los Angeles.

In 2010, Seftel produced Invitation to World Literature, a 13-part docu-series for WGBH that explored the themes of great literature. Subjects included composer Philip Glass, actress Kristin Chenoweth, actor Alan Cumming, Nobel-Prize winning novelist Orhan Pamuk, and author Francine Prose.

After his success with Ennis’ Gift, Seftel went on to direct and produce an hour-long PBS documentary, It's the Hard-Knock Life about the revival of the classic musical “Annie” being directed by Broadway legend, James Lapine in 2013. In 2014, his short documentary The Home Team premiered at the SXSW Film Festival and screened at numerous others including Sarasota, Nashville, and AFI Docs. The Home Team documented the last game of the season for the Murray State Racers in Murray, Kentucky.

2015 brought two projects for Mr. Seftel: The Many Sad Fates of Mr. Toledano, a 2016 New York Times Op-Doc, as well as Zain's Summer. In The Many Sad Fates of Mr. Toledano, which was premiered at the Tribeca Film Festival, Seftel and photographer, Phillip Toledano explore a series of ways that Toledano can die, using makeup and photographs to simulate potential outcomes. Zain's Summer follows a young Pakistani immigrant who has a very short time to adjust to life in America.

In 2016 Seftel directed and produced The Secret Life of Muslims, a series of 14 short documentary profiles and subject films on life as a Muslim-American today. This series features many prominent Muslim figures, including AJ+ correspondent Dena Takruri, US Olympic medalist Ibtihaj Muhammad, NYTimes bestselling author Reza Aslan, and founder and editor of Muslimgirl, Amani Al-Khatahbah, among many others. The Secret Life of Muslims is what Flavorwire called "a blast of clarity and human in the face of so much fear-mongering." The series has been distributed by Vox, USA Today, CBS Sunday Morning, The Huffington Post, and Upworthy.

In 2022, his film Stranger at the Gate was featured by The New Yorker, and was nominated for the Academy Award for Best Documentary Short Film.

In 2025, Seftel directed All the Empty Rooms following Steve Hartman and Lou Bopp embarking across the United States to memorialize the childhood bedrooms of those lost to school shootings. The film won an Oscar for best documentary short in 2026.

=== Scripted work ===
Seftel moved into scripted film work with Breaking the Mold: The Kee Malesky Story that told the fictional story of a young librarian's work to defeat toxic, asthma-inducing mold. The title character borrows the name of real-life NPR librarian Kee Malesky. The humorous film originated when Maryland Public Television asked Seftel to make a fictional piece about indoor air quality for middle-school aged children. The film played at the Los Angeles International Short Film Festival, the Newport International Film Festival, the Austin Film Festival and was awarded a Certificate of Excellence by the jury of the Chicago International Children's Film Festival. Breaking the Mold was shown at the One Reel Film Festival in Seattle where director Alexander Payne was a judge.

=== Feature films ===
After seeing the film Breaking the Mold, director Alexander Payne put Seftel in touch with John Cusack and Mark Leyner. This led to Seftel directing the feature film War, Inc., starring Cusack, and co-written by Leyner, Cusack, and Jeremy Pikser. War, Inc. premiered at the 7th Annual Tribeca Film Festival in April 2008. The movie is a political satire set in Turaqistan, a fictional country occupied by an American private corporation run by a former US Vice-President (Dan Aykroyd). The film also stars Hilary Duff and Marisa Tomei.

=== Television, radio, and print journalism ===
Seftel has also worked in television, producing for ABC Turning Point, CBS Evening News, CBS Sunday Morning, PBS' Nova Science Now series and the award-winning public radio program This American Life. At CBS News, Seftel was brought in by then Executive Vice President Jonathan Klein (current President of CNN) to promote the use of the mini-DV format at the network.

For This American Life, Seftel produced a 1997 radio documentary entitled Trek about an exploration of race and friendship in post-apartheid South Africa. He also produced a segment called "Still Life" in episode #2 "My Way" for This American Life the television show, which aired on Showtime in 2007. Seftel also adapted NPR's This I Believe series from radio to public television for WGBH Boston. Seftel's short stories and articles have been featured on NPR, Salon.com, and The Seattle Times.

After Seftel's experience with WGBH and This American Life, he went on to produce Lidia Celebrates America in 2011-2012. In this mini-series produced for PBS, chef Lidia Bastianich and guests Stanley Tucci, Mo Rocca and Mario Batali explore how immigrants have preserved their culinary traditions. The project was nominated for both a James Beard Foundation Broadcast Media Award for Special/Documentary and a Silver Telly award.

=== Reality television ===
In reality television, Seftel directed the first two seasons of Queer Eye for the Straight Guy and received a National Emmy Award Nomination for his work on the series. He also helped develop the A&E series Confessions of a Matchmaker, featuring Patti Novak, directing the series pilot, and served as Supervising Producer for the series. Seftel also developed the Emmy-nominated PBS children's reality game show Fetch! with Ruff Ruffman and directed the first season.

== Awards and nominations ==
Seftel was awarded a National Arts Journalism Fellowship at the Columbia University Graduate School of Journalism and Columbia University School of the Arts in 2003.
