= 52nd Telluride Film Festival =

2025 film festival

- Location: Telluride, Colorado, United States
- Founded: 1974
- Awards: Telluride Film Festival Silver Medallion: Noah Baumbach; Jafar Panahi; Ethan Hawke
- Artistic director: Julie Huntsinger
- Festival date: August 29 – September 1, 2025
- Website: www.telluridefilmfestival.org

Telluride Film Festival
- 53rd 51st

The 52nd Telluride Film Festival took place from August 29 to September 1, 2025, in Telluride, Colorado.

The official line-up was announced, as usual, the day before the festival's official opening, August 28. The Telluride Film Festival Silver Medallion was presented to Noah Baumbach, Jafar Panahi and Ethan Hawke, while the Special Medallion was awarded to producer Tessa Ross.

World premieres includes The American Revolution, Ask E. Jean, Ballad of a Small Player, The Cycle of Love, Everywhere Man: The Lives and Times of Peter Asher, Highway 99: A Double Album, Hamlet, Hamnet, H Is for Hawk, Karl, Lost in the Jungle, Man on the Run, The New Yorker at 100, The Reserve, Springsteen: Deliver Me from Nowhere, Summer Tour, This Is Not a Drill and Tuner.

Graphic novelist Daniel Clowes designed the festival's official poster.

== Official Sections ==
The official line-up was announced, as usual, on the day before the festival's official opening.

=== Main Program ===
The following films were selected to be screened:

English title	Original title	Director(s)	Production country
The American Revolution (series)		Ken Burns, Sarah Botstein and David Schmidt	United States
Ask E. Jean		Ivy Meeropol	United States
Ballad of a Small Player		Edward Berger	United Kingdom, Germany
The Bend in the River		Robb Moss	United States
Blue Moon		Richard Linklater	United States
Bugonia		Yorgos Lanthimos	Ireland, South Korea, United States
Cover-Up		Laura Poitras and Mark Obenhaus	United States
The Cycle of Love		Orlando von Einsiedel	United Kingdom, India, Sweden
Frankenstein		Guillermo del Toro	United States
Ghost Elephants		Werner Herzog	United States
La grazia		Paolo Sorrentino	Italy
Hamlet		Aneil Karia	United Kingdom
Hamnet		Chloé Zhao	United Kingdom, United States
Highway 99: A Double Album		Ethan Hawke	United States
The History of Sound		Oliver Hermanus	United Kingdom, United States
If I Had Legs I'd Kick You		Mary Bronstein	United States
H Is for Hawk		Philippa Lowthorpe	United Kingdom, United States
It Was Just an Accident	یک تصادف ساده	Jafar Panahi	Iran, France, Luxembourg
Jay Kelly		Noah Baumbach	United Kingdom, United States
Karl		Nick Hooker	United Kingdom
Lost in the Jungle		Elizabeth Chai Vasarhelyi, Jimmy Chin and Juan Camilo Cruz	United States, Colombia
Man on the Run		Morgan Neville	United States
The Mastermind		Kelly Reichardt	United States, United Kingdom
The New Yorker at 100		Marshall Curry	United States
Nouvelle Vague		Richard Linklater	France, United States
Peter Asher: Everywhere Man		Dayna Goldfine and Dan Geller	United States, United Kingdom
Pillion		Harry Lighton	United Kingdom
A Private Life	Vie privée	Rebecca Zlotowski	France
The Reserve		Pablo Pérez Lombardini	Mexico, Qatar
The Secret Agent	O Agente Secreto	Kleber Mendonça Filho	Brazil, France, Netherlands, Germany
Sentimental Value	Affeksjonsverdi	Joachim Trier	Norway, France, Denmark, Germany, Sweden, United Kingdom
Shifty (series)		Adam Curtis	United Kingdom
Springsteen: Deliver Me from Nowhere		Scott Cooper	United States
Summer Tour		Mischa Richter	United States
This Is Not a Drill		Oren Jacoby	United States
Tuner		Daniel Roher	Canada, United States
Urchin		Harris Dickinson	United Kingdom
Short films
All the Empty Rooms		Joshua Seftel	United States
All the Walls Came Down		Ondi Timoner	United States
Last Days on Lake Trinity		Charlotte Cooley	United States
Sallie's Ashes		Brennan Robideaux	United States
Song of My City		David C. Roberts	United States
