= Kee Malesky =

American research librarian (1950–2025)

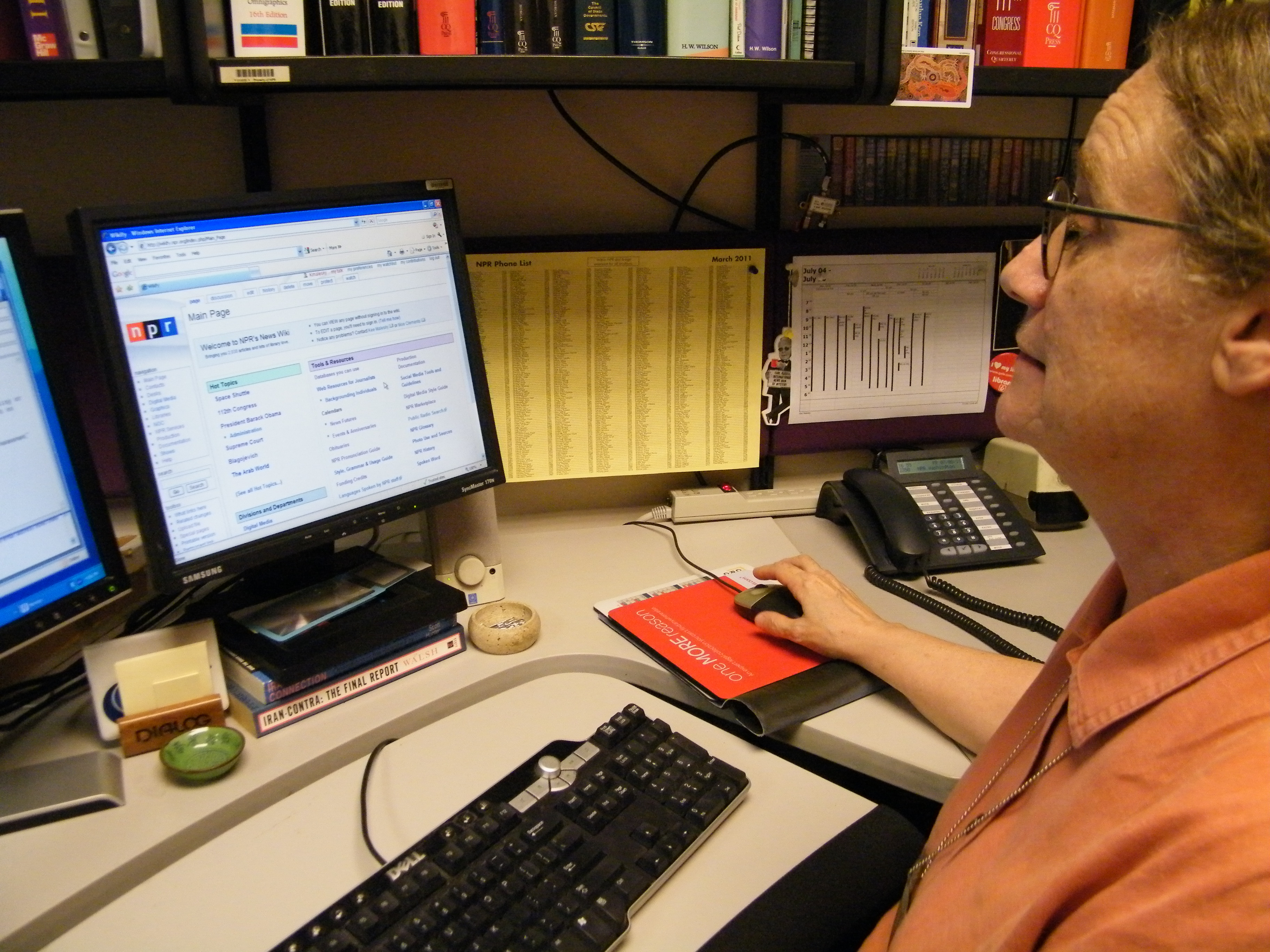
- Malesky in 2011
- Born: Christine Mary Shields; October 25, 1950
- Died: March 2, 2025 (aged 74)
- Citizenship: United States
- Occupations: Research librarian, author
- Employer: NPR

Christine Mary Malesky (née Shields; October 25, 1950 – March 2, 2025), better known as Kee Malesky, was an American reference librarian and writer. She was a reference librarian at NPR for more than 20 years.

== Education and career ==
After briefly working for NPR in an administrative position in the 1970s, Malesky left the network. Malesky returned to NPR in 1984, this time as part of the NPR Broadcast Library. She catalogued NPR programs for the next three years, and then became "the staff librarian for the original version of NPR’s arts magazine program, Performance Today". She earned her master's degree library science from the Catholic University of America in Washington, DC in 1986.

In March 1990, Malesky moved to NPR's News Reference Library. As a reference librarian at NPR, Malesky worked on background research, fact checking, and provided information on grammar and pronunciations (such as how to say Niger and determining whether to refer to the Italian city as Turin or Torino). She also managed the company's reference library, numbering about 3,000 books. Oftentimes, Malesky was one of only "two and a half" reference library staffers, and was the only reference librarian who worked weekends. She noted that when EgyptAir Flight 990 crashed in 1999, "I got a call at 5:30 in the morning suggesting that I come in early. I spent the entire day answering plane crash questions for reporters, preparing fact sheets, talking to editors and producers about what they would need for the next news cycle".

While at NPR, Malesky witnessed the changes that the internet brought to research, and to reference librarianship in particular. She taught reporters how to use some online news databases, such as Lexis-Nexis Universe, allowing them to do some research on their own.

In addition to her reference work, Malesky also worked on other projects, such as "producing Election Night briefing books, documenting the early history of [NPR], and designing training programs for [NPR] staff". In 2011 and 2012, she published some articles on NPR about interesting historical tidbits, under the column name 'Kee Facts: A Few Things You Didn't Know".

As of 2006, she was an adjunct faculty member of the member of the School of Library and Information Science at Catholic University. She was a member of the Special Libraries Association and Beta Phi Mu.

In 2010, she published All Facts Considered: The Essential Library of Inessential Knowledge, a compilation of facts across different fields and cultures she had learned during her time at NPR. This was followed up two years later with the book Learn Something New Every Day: 365 Facts to Fulfill Your Life, a collection of daily facts covering history, science, and culture, in 2012.

She left NPR in 2014.

== Personal life ==
Kee Malesky was born Christine Mary Shields. She was raised in Brooklyn, New York City, adopting the name "Kee" at a young age, a mispronunciation of "Christine" by her youngest sister.

She married Robert Malesky in 1970; he also came to work at NPR.

In 2003, Malesky gave permission for Maryland Public Television to use her name for the protagonist of their commissioned coming-of-age film, Breaking the Mold: The Kee Malesky Story. Directed by Joshua Seftel and starring Danielle Perry in the title role, the film follows a teenage Malesky as she investigates the cause of her persistent cough, uncovers mold as the culprit, and exposes the frauds who dismissed her concerns. The jury of the Chicago International Children's Film Festival awarded it a Certificate of Excellence.

In 2011, NPR noted in an article about Wikipedia that Malesky kept "a running document of the site's flubs", but she was "not absolutely opposed to the concept of a free encyclopedia", and thought it could "be a good starting place for reference links or to get the gist of a topic".

Malesky died on March 2, 2025, at the age of 74.

== Awards and honors ==
- 2006 News Division Henebry Award
- 2012 Dow Jones Leadership Award, Special Libraries Association

== Publications ==
=== Books ===
- Malesky, Kee (October 19, 2010). All Facts Considered: The Essential Library of Inessential Knowledge. Wiley. ISBN 978-0-470-55965-9.
- Learn Something New Every Day: 365 Facts to Fulfill Your Life. 2012.

=== Chapters ===
- Geiger, Richard; Malesky, Kee (2003). "News Libraries". Encyclopedia of Library & Information Science (Electronic ed.).
