= Hamlet (2025 film) =

Film by Aneil Karia

- Theatrical release poster
- Directed by: Aneil Karia
- Screenplay by: Michael Lesslie
- Based on: Hamlet by William Shakespeare
- Produced by: James Wilson; Riz Ahmed; Michael Lesslie; Allie Moore; Tommy Oliver
- Starring: Riz Ahmed; Morfydd Clark; Joe Alwyn; Sheeba Chaddha; Avijit Dutt; Art Malik; Timothy Spall
- Cinematography: Stuart Bentley
- Edited by: Mikkel E.G. Nielsen; Amanda James
- Music by: Maxwell Sterling
- Production companies: BBC Film; Left Handed Films; Storyteller Films; JW Films; Confluential Films
- Distributed by: Focus Features (through Universal Pictures)
- Release dates: August 30, 2025 (Telluride); February 6, 2026 (United Kingdom)
- Running time: 113 minutes
- Country: United Kingdom
- Language: English
- Box office: $842,556

Hamlet is a 2025 British drama film based on William Shakespeare's Hamlet, reimagined in a contemporary London. Directed by Aneil Karia and written by Michael Lesslie, it stars Riz Ahmed, Morfydd Clark, Joe Alwyn, Sheeba Chaddha, Avijit Dutt, Art Malik, and Timothy Spall. The film had its premiere at the 52nd Telluride Film Festival on 30 August 2025 and was released in theatres in the United Kingdom on 6 February 2026.

== Premise ==
Haunted by his father's ghost, Prince Hamlet descends from elite London society into the city's underground, moving between Hindu temples and homeless camps. In seeking to avenge his father's murder, he begins to question his own role in his family's corruption.

== Cast ==
- Riz Ahmed as Prince Hamlet
- Art Malik as Claudius
- Morfydd Clark as Ophelia
- Joe Alwyn as Laertes
- Sheeba Chaddha as Gertrude
- Timothy Spall as Polonius
- Avijit Dutt as the ghost of Hamlet's father

== Production ==
In October 2017, a Hamlet film adaptation written by Mike Lesslie and starring Riz Ahmed was announced, with Netflix in talks to finance and distribute. After years in development, Aneil Karia was attached as director in May 2022. Ahmed stars and serves as a producer alongside Allie Moore for Left-Handed Films, Lesslie for Storyteller Films, and James Wilson. Tommy Oliver produced and co-financed through Confluential Films, alongside BBC Film, BFI, and Ken Kao's Waypoint Entertainment. Morfydd Clark and Joe Alwyn were cast as Ophelia and Laertes, respectively. Additionally, Sheeba Chaddha, Art Malik and Timothy Spall were cast.

Principal photography took place in London, England from 8 November to 21 December 2023.

== Release ==
Hamlet had its world premiere at the 52nd Telluride Film Festival on 30 August 2025, followed by a screening at the 2025 Toronto International Film Festival on 5 September. In January 2024, Focus Features acquired the film's international distribution rights. Hamlet had a theatrical release on 6 February 2026. In January 2026, Vertical acquired the North American rights, setting a release date of 10 April 2026 for the region.

== Reception ==
=== Critical response ===
On the review aggregator website Rotten Tomatoes, 71% of 105 critics' reviews are positive, with an average rating of 6.5/10. The website's consensus reads: "Fueled by Riz Ahmed's electrifying turn, this gritty, streamlined Hamlet boldly reimagines the classic tragedy with ferocious emotion and intent." Metacritic, which uses a weighted average, assigned the film a score of 61 out of 100, based on 22 critics, indicating "generally favorable" reviews.

=== Accolades ===
Award	Date of ceremony	Category	Recipient	Result	Ref.
National Film Awards UK	July 1, 2026	Best Drama	Hamlet	Nominated	
National Film Awards UK	July 1, 2026	Best Actor	Riz Ahmed	Nominated	
National Film Awards UK	July 1, 2026	Best Supporting Actress	Morfydd Clark	Nominated	
National Film Awards UK	July 1, 2026	Best Supporting Actor	Art Malik	Won	
National Film Awards UK	July 1, 2026	Best Director	Aneil Karia	Nominated	
National Film Awards UK	July 1, 2026	Outstanding Performance	Riz Ahmed	Nominated	
