= Last Days on Lake Trinity =

2025 American short documentary film

- Release poster
- Directed by: Charlotte Cooley
- Produced by: Nick Ramey; Charlotte Cooley
- Starring: Laurie Laney; Nancy Fleishman; Nancy Sanderson
- Cinematography: Nick Ramey
- Edited by: Penelope Falk
- Music by: Jonatan Szer
- Production company: The New Yorker
- Distributed by: The New Yorker
- Release date: August 31, 2025 (Telluride)
- Running time: 29 minutes
- Country: United States
- Language: English

Last Days on Lake Trinity is a 2025 American documentary short film, directed by Charlotte Cooley. The film that depicts corporate cruelty, religious hypocrisy, and a mounting housing crisis for older Americans had its world premiere at the 52nd Telluride Film Festival on August 31, 2025.

It was shortlisted for the Best Documentary Short Film at the 98th Academy Awards.

== Summary ==
In March, 2022, due to a South Florida trailer park facing shutdown by its owner, the Trinity Broadcasting Network, three friends Nancy Sanderson, Nancy Fleishman, and Laurie Laney confront the threat of eviction before year’s end. The film traces their efforts to cope with the looming displacement, highlighting their shared humor, empathy, and determination amid the uncertainty.

== Cast ==
- Laurie Laney
- Nancy Fleishman
- Nancy Sanderson

== Release ==
Last Days on Lake Trinity had its world premiere at the 52nd Telluride Film Festival on August 31, 2025. It was presented at the Hot Springs Documentary Film Festival in documentary shorts on October 14, 2025 and in the New Hampshire Film Festival on October 16, 2025. The film had its Hudson Valley Premiere at the Woodstock Film Festival on October 17, 2025. On November 17, 2025, it was screened in the Short List Shorts: Women are the Strength at Doc NYC along with other three films. The film was released by The New Yorker on November 18, 2025.

== Accolades ==
Award	Date of ceremony	Category	Recipient(s)	Result	Ref.
Nantucket Film Festival	June 30, 2025	Audience Award Documentary Short	Last Days on Lake Trinity	Won	
Rhode Island International Film Festival	August 10, 2025	Best Short Documentary First Prize	Last Days on Lake Trinity	Won	
Woodstock Film Festival	October 18, 2025	Best Short Documentary	Last Days on Lake Trinity	Won	

== See also ==
- Academy Award for Best Documentary Short Film
- Submissions for Best Documentary Short Academy Award
