= Mischa Richter (photographer) =

American photographer and filmmaker

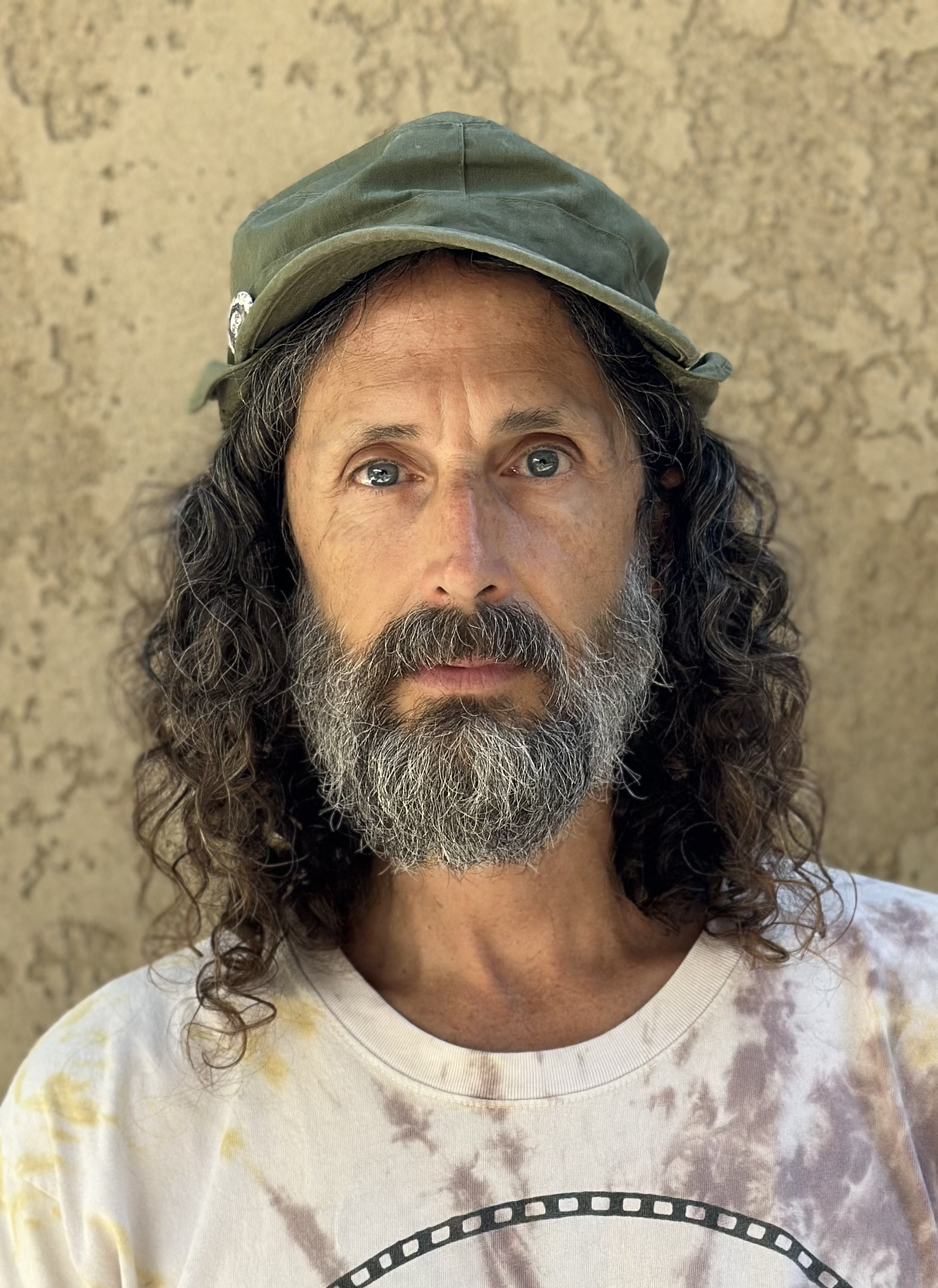
Richter in 2026

Mischa Richter is an American photographer and filmmaker.

== Early life and education ==
Richter was born in Windsor, England. He is the son of Daniel Richter and Jill Richter. His grandfather is the New Yorker cartoonist Mischa Richter. As a child, he spent the summer in Provincetown, Massachusetts. Around the age of six, he moved there full time where he lived until he was in his early teens. He attended several different high schools in his teens. He graduated from Darien High School. He dated fellow Darien high school student Chloë Sevigny, with whom he became a fan of the Grateful Dead. Together they snuck into Dead shows and experimented with psychedelics. After high school, he moved back to England and attended Chelsea College of Arts and Middlesex University.

== Career ==
While in England, Richter worked as a high-end portrait photographer with his work featured in Vogue, Esquire, and Wallpaper. His 2006 shoot of singer Amy Winehouse was used on the back of her final album, Back to Black.

In 2010, Richter published the book Saudade, a photographic collection of "recognizable locals, landmarks, and totem-like objects." The works in the book were also featured in an exhibition at the Provincetown Art Association and Museum.

In 2020, Richter directed the film I Am a Town, an examination of people that live in Provincetown.

In 2025, Richter directed the film Summer Tour, which tracks a group of Deadheads as they follow Dead & Company on its final tour in 2023.

== Personal life ==
In 2000, Richter married actress Dolly Wells. Together they have a daughter and son. In 2020, Richter and Wells divorced.

== Filmography ==
- I Am a Town (2020)
- Summer Tour (2025)
