= Submissions for Best Documentary Short Academy Award =

Oscar Best Documentary Short shortlists

Finalists for the Academy Award for Best Documentary Short Film are selected by the Documentary Branch of the Academy of Motion Picture Arts and Sciences based on a preliminary ballot. A second preferential ballot determines the five nominees. These are the additional films that were shortlisted without being nominated.

== List of shortlisted films ==
Year	Finalists
2005	Abused, Dimmer, Mr. Mergler's Gift, Positively Naked
2006	Dear Talula, The Diary of Immaculée, Phoenix Dance, A Revolving Door
2007	Body & Soul: Diana & Kathy, If It Happens, Ochberg's Orphans, Portraits of a Lady
2008	David McCullough: Painting With Words, Downstream, Tongzhi in Love, Viva La Causa
2009	Lt. Watada, Tell Them Anything You Want: A Portrait of Maurice Sendak, Woman Rebel
2010	Born Sweet, Living for 32, One Thousand Pictures: RFK's Last Journey
2011	In Tahrir Square: 18 Days of Egypt's Unfinished Revolution, Pipe Dreams, Witness
2012	The Education of Mohammad Hussein, ParaÍso, The Perfect Fit
2013	Jujitsu-ing Reality, Recollections, SLOMO
2014	Kehinde Wiley: An Economy of Grace, The Lion's Mouth Opens, One Child
2015	50 Feet from Syria, Minerita, My Enemy, My Brother, Starting Point, The Testimony
2016	Brillo Box (3 ¢ Off), Close Ties, Frame 394, The Mute's House, The Other Side of Home
2017	Alone, Kayayo – The Living Shopping Baskets, 116 Cameras, Ram Dass, Going Home, Ten Meter Tower
2018	Los Comandos, My Dead Dad's Porno Tapes, 63 Boycott, Women of the Gulag, Zion
2019	After Maria, Ghosts of Sugar Land, Fire in Paradise, The Nightcrawlers, Stay Close
2020	Abortion Helpline, This Is Lisa, Call Center Blues, Hysterical Girl, The Speed Cubers, What Would Sophia Loren Do?
2021	Águilas, A Broken House, Camp Confidential: America's Secret Nazis, Coded: The Hidden Love of J.C. Leyendecker, Day of Rage: How Trump Supporters Took the U.S. Capitol, The Facility, Lynching Postcards: Token of a Great Day, Sophie & the Baron, Takeover, Terror Contagion
2022	American Justice on Trial: People v. Newton, Anastasia, Angola Do You Hear Us? Voices from a Plantation Prison, As Far as They Can Run, The Flagmakers, Happiness Is £4 Million, Holding Moses, Nuisance Bear, Shut Up and Paint, 38 at the Garden
2023	Bear, Between Earth & Sky, Black Girls Play: The Story of Hand Games, Camp Courage, Deciding Vote, How We Get Free, If Dreams Were Lightning: Rural Healthcare Crisis, Last Song from Kabul, Oasis, Wings of Dust
2024	Chasing Roo, Eternal Father, Keeper, Makayla's Voice: A Letter to the World, Once upon a Time in Ukraine, Planetwalker, The Quilters, Seat 31: Zooey Zephyr, A Swim Lesson, Until He's Back
2025	All the Walls Came Down, Bad Hostage, Cashing Out, Chasing Time, Classroom 4, Heartbeat, Last Days on Lake Trinity, On Healing Land, Birds Perch, Rovina's Choice, We Were the Scenery

== See also ==
- Submissions for the Academy Award for Best Documentary Feature
- Academy Award for Best Documentary Short Film
