= Jeremy Pikser =

American screenwriter

Jeremy Pikser is an American screenwriter. Pikser is best known for Bulworth (co-written with Warren Beatty), which was nominated for Academy, Golden Globe and WGA Awards for Best Screenplay and which won the Los Angeles Film Critics' Best Screenplay award for 1998.

Pikser got his start working as a "special consultant" and uncredited writer on the film Reds (a screenplay also co-written by Beatty nominated for an Academy Award). He wrote The Lemon Sisters and War, Inc. (co-written with Mark Leyner and John Cusack), which premiered at the 2008 Tribeca Film Festival in New York City. He was "supervising writer" for Pink Subaru, which opened at the Turin Film Festival in 2009.

Pikser teaches screenwriting at New York University in the Rita and Burton Goldberg department of dramatic writing at the Tisch School of the Arts and formerly taught in the Program in Film and Media in Johns Hopkins University’s Advanced Academic Programs. He was the creative director of the Saul Zaentz Innovation Fund Screenwriting Lab. Pikser is a regular advisor at the Sundance Screenwriters' Lab. He is also an occasional contributor to The Huffington Post and he has commented on the writer's strike and other subjects on The Guardian website Comment Is Free.

At Oberlin College, he was a leading opponent of the Vietnam War, and he was one of the authors and organizers of the Not in Our Name Statement of Conscience, opposing the U.S. invasions of Afghanistan and Iraq.

In 2019, as vice president of WGA-E, Pikser oversaw the negotiating committee for the WGA-Agency Agreement, and he joined other WGA members in firing his agents as part of the guild's stand against the Association of Talent Agents after the two sides were unable to come to an agreement on a new Code of Conduct that addressed the practice of packaging.
