= Linda Reisman =

American film producer and college professor

- Education: Antioch College; San Francisco Art Institute
- Occupations: Film producer; College professor
- Years active: 1985–present

Linda Reisman is an American film producer and college professor. She is perhaps best known for producing the independent films Affliction (1997) and Leave No Trace (2018), both of which were released under her Reisman Productions banner, and executive producing the critically acclaimed film The Danish Girl (2015).

Reisman is a Senior Distinguished Producer-in-Residence in Visual and Media Arts at Emerson College.

== Education ==
She graduated with a B.F.A. from Antioch College and a M.F.A. from San Francisco Art Institute.

== Career ==
Reisman entered the film business, working as Paul Schrader's assistant on Mishima: A Life in Four Chapters (1985) and Light of Day (1987). She continued to work with Schrader on Patty Hearst (1988), The Comfort of Strangers (1990), Light Sleeper (1992), and Affliction (1997), serving as a producer. She also worked with Keith Gordon on two films: Mother Night (1996) and Waking the Dead (2000). Her other credits include No Such Thing (2001), Jeepers Creepers (2001), Pumpkin (2002), and Assassination Tango (2002). She had spent over 10 years bringing The Danish Girl (2015) and Leave No Trace (2018) to the screen.

Reisman is a member of the Academy of Motion Picture Arts and Sciences and the Producers Guild of America. She serves annually as a judge for both the Academy's Nicholl Fellowships in Screenwriting and the Student Academy Awards. Reisman also serves on the USC Scripter Award Selection Committee.

== Filmography ==
=== As a producer ===
- Light Sleeper (1992)
- Affliction (1997)
- Waking the Dead (2000)
- Leave No Trace (2018)

=== As an associate producer ===
- Patty Hearst (1988)
- The Comfort of Strangers (1990)

=== As an executive producer ===
- Mother Night (1996)
- No Such Thing (2001)
- Jeepers Creepers (2001)
- Pumpkin (2002)
- Assassination Tango (2002)
- The Danish Girl (2015)

=== As a consulting producer ===
- Titus (1999)

== Awards and nominations ==
Year	Award	Category	Nominated work	Result	Ref.
1999	14th Independent Spirit Awards	Best Feature	Affliction	Nominated	
2019	34th Independent Spirit Awards	Best Feature (shared with Anne Harrison and Anne Rosellini)	Leave No Trace	Nominated	
