= 22nd Independent Spirit Awards =

US film awards ceremony in 2007

- Date: February 24, 2007
- Site: U.S.
- Hosted by: Sarah Silverman

Highlights
- Best Film: Little Miss Sunshine
- Most awards: Little Miss Sunshine (4)
- Most nominations: Half Nelson (6)

The 22nd Independent Spirit Awards, honoring the best independent films of 2006, were presented on February 24, 2007. The nominations were announced on November 28, 2006. Sarah Silverman returned as host for the second consecutive year.

== Winners and nominees ==
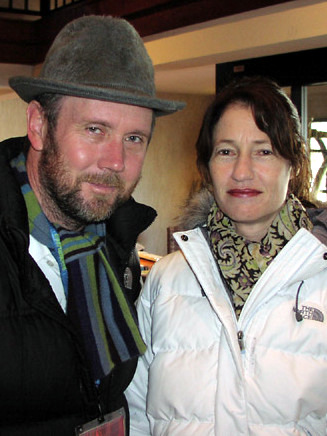
Jonathan Dayton and Valerie Faris, Best Director winners

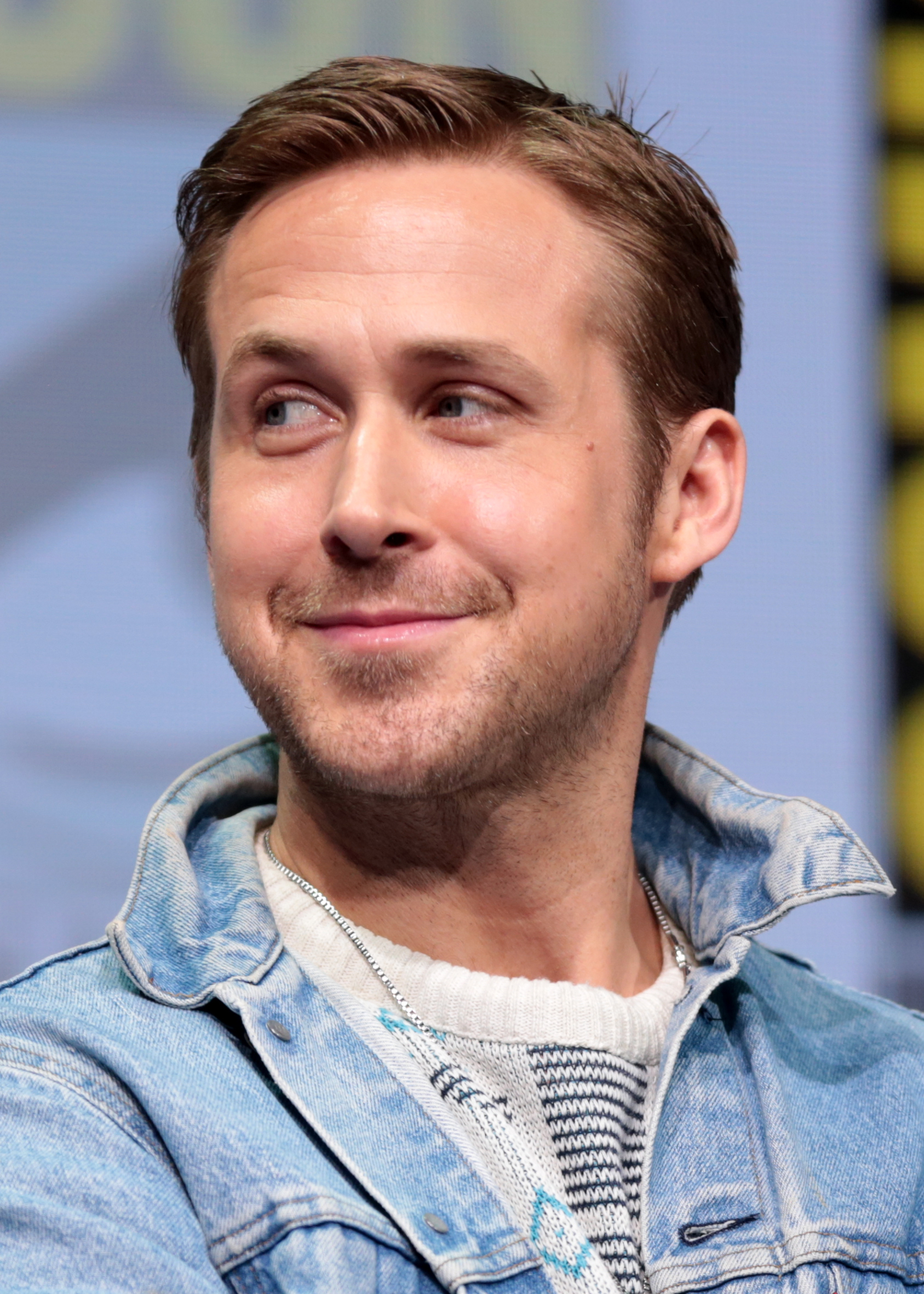
Ryan Gosling, Best Male Lead winner

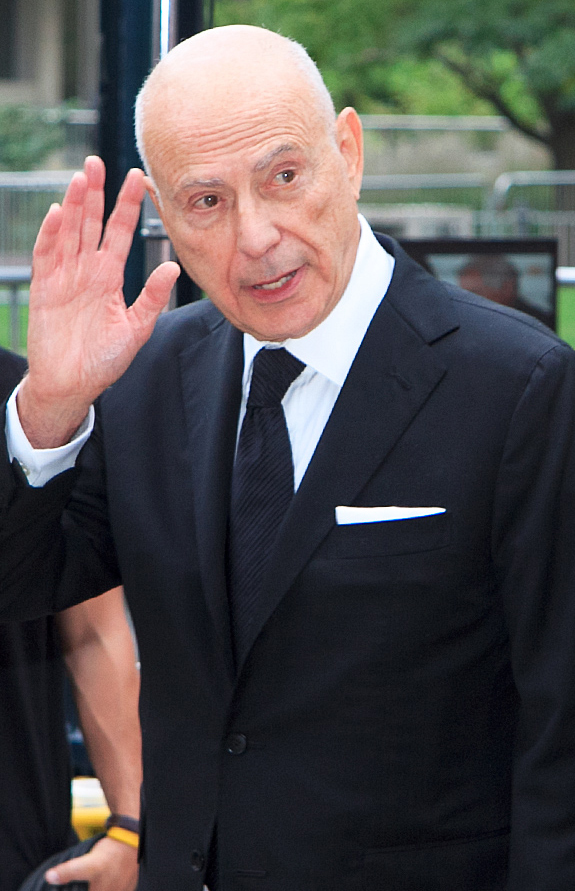
Alan Arkin, Best Supporting Male winner

Frances McDormand, Best Supporting Female winner

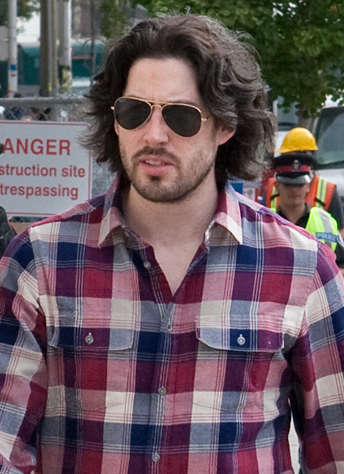
Jason Reitman, Best Screenplay winner

Best Feature	Best Director
Little Miss Sunshine: American Gun; The Dead Girl; Half Nelson; Pan's Labyrinth	Jonathan Dayton and Valerie Faris – Little Miss Sunshine: Robert Altman – A Prairie Home Companion (posthumous); Ryan Fleck – Half Nelson; Karen Moncrieff – The Dead Girl; Steven Soderbergh – Bubble
Best Male Lead	Best Female Lead
Ryan Gosling – Half Nelson: Aaron Eckhart – Thank You for Smoking; Edward Norton – The Painted Veil; Ahmad Razvi – Man Push Cart; Forest Whitaker – American Gun	Shareeka Epps – Half Nelson: Catherine O'Hara – For Your Consideration; Elizabeth Reaser – Sweet Land; Michelle Williams – Land of Plenty; Robin Wright Penn – Sorry, Haters
Best Supporting Male	Best Supporting Female
Alan Arkin – Little Miss Sunshine: Raymond J. Barry – Steel City; Daniel Craig – Infamous; Paul Dano – Little Miss Sunshine; Channing Tatum – A Guide to Recognizing Your Saints	Frances McDormand – Friends with Money: Melonie Diaz – A Guide to Recognizing Your Saints; Marcia Gay Harden – American Gun; Mary Beth Hurt – The Dead Girl; Amber Tamblyn – Stephanie Daley
Best Screenplay	Best First Screenplay
Thank You for Smoking – Jason Reitman: Friends with Money – Nicole Holofcener; The Illusionist – Neil Burger; The Painted Veil – Ron Nyswaner; Sorry, Haters – Jeff Stanzler	Little Miss Sunshine – Michael Arndt: Conversations with Other Women – Gabrielle Zevin; A Guide to Recognizing Your Saints – Dito Montiel; Half Nelson – Anna Boden and Ryan Fleck; Wristcutters: A Love Story – Goran Dukić
Best First Feature	Best Documentary Feature
Sweet Land: Day Night Day Night; Man Push Cart; The Motel; Wristcutters: A Love Story	The Road to Guantánamo: A Lion in the House; My Country, My Country; The Trials of Darryl Hunt; You're Gonna Miss Me
Best Cinematography	Best International Film
Pan's Labyrinth – Guillermo Navarro: Brothers of the Head – Anthony Dod Mantle; Four Eyed Monsters – Arin Crumley; Man Push Cart – Michael Simmonds; Wild Tigers I Have Known – Aaron Platt	The Lives of Others • Germany: 12:08 East of Bucharest • Romania; The Blossoming of Maximo Oliveros • Philippines; Chronicle of an Escape • Argentina; Days of Glory • Algeria / Belgium / France / Morocco

=== Films with multiple nominations and awards ===
Films that received multiple nominations
Nominations	Film
6	Half Nelson
5	Little Miss Sunshine
3	American Gun
3	The Dead Girl
3	A Guide to Recognizing Your Saints
3	Man Push Cart
2	Day Night Day Night
2	Four Eyed Monsters
2	Friends with Money
2	The Painted Veil
2	Pan's Labyrinth
2	Sorry, Haters
2	Sweet Land
2	Thank You for Smoking
2	Wristcutters: A Love Story

Films that won multiple awards
Awards	Film
4	Little Miss Sunshine
2	Half Nelson

== Special awards ==
=== John Cassavetes Award ===
Quinceañera

- 12 and Holding
- Chalk
- Four Eyed Monsters
- Old Joy

=== Truer Than Fiction Award ===
Adele Horne – The Tailenders

- Eric Daniel Metzgar – The Chances of the World Changing
- A. J. Schnack – Kurt Cobain: About a Son

=== Producers Award ===
Howard Gertler and Tim Perell – Pizza and Shortbus

- Julie Lynn – 10 Items or Less and Nine Lives
- Alex Orlovsky and Jamie Patricof – Half Nelson and Point&Shoot

=== Someone to Watch Award ===
Julia Loktev – Day Night Day Night

- So Yong Kim – In Between Days
- Richard Wong – Colma: The Musical

=== Robert Altman Award ===
- Robert Altman (posthumous)

=== Special Distinction Award ===
- Laura Dern and David Lynch ("in recognition of their unique and stunning collaborative work in the mesmerizing Inland Empire as well as the influential independent classics Blue Velvet and Wild at Heart")
