= Anna Nemzer =

Russian journalist (born 1980)

- Анна Немзер
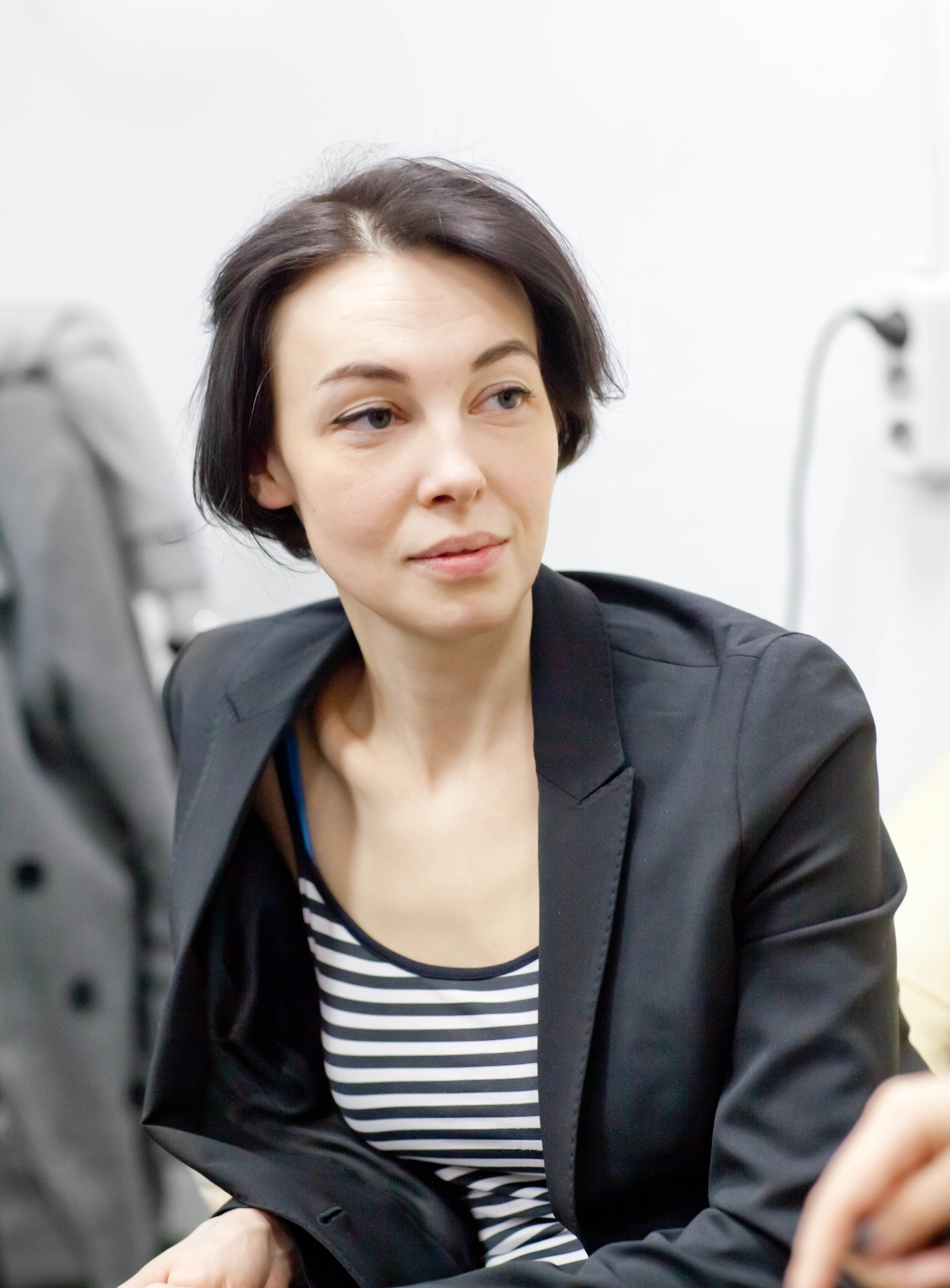
- Nemzer in 2019
- Born: 19 May 1980 (age 46); Moscow, Russian SSR, Soviet Union
- Citizenship: Russia
- Education: Russian State University for the Humanities; Gerasimov Institute of Cinematography
- Occupations: Journalist; Filmmaker
- Employer: TV Rain

Anna Andreyevna Nemzer (Russian: Анна Андреевна Немзер; born 19 May 1980) is a Russian journalist who was editor-in-chief of TV Rain, an independent Russian-language television programme. Living in exile in the United States since the Russian invasion of Ukraine in 2022, Nemzer co-directed and was featured in the 2024 documentary My Undesirable Friends: Part I — Last Air in Moscow.

== Early life and education ==
Nemzer was born in Moscow in what was then the Soviet Union. Her father, Andrey Nemzer, was a noted literary critic and scholar. Nemzer graduated with a degree in history and philology at the Russian State University for the Humanities before studying documentary filmmaking at the Gerasimov Institute of Cinematography.

== Career ==
After graduating, Nemzer worked for Russian television channels including ORT and Kultura, in addition to writing for outlets such as Snob, Russkiy reportyor and Vokrug sveta. In 2014, Nemzer began working for TV Rain, then based in Russia, as its editor-in-chief, focusing on socio-economic issues. She hosted the show Who's Got the Power?, in which she interviewed noted opposition figures, including writers and activists. Nemzer was a vocal critic of the President of Russia, Vladimir Putin, comparing his actions to the Soviet leader Joseph Stalin.

In February 2022, following the Russian invasion of Ukraine, Nemzer, who was on holiday in Tel Aviv, Israel, at the time, went into exile; TV Rain was blocked shortly afterwards by the Russian government. Nemzer began posting videos onto YouTube, and her work with TV Rain resumed after the channel began operating from countries outside of Russia. As of 2024, Nemzer is based in New York City, United States.

Nemzer subsequently co-founded, with support from Bard College and PEN America, the Russian Independent Media Outlet, which aims to preserve all facets of Russian independent media for the historical record, which Nemzer has described as a "record of the truth" in response to oppression from Russian authorities. She works alongside her former TV Rain colleague Ksenia Mironova.

On 20 March 2026, Nemzer was declared a foreign agent by the Russian government. The Ministry of Justice accused her of disseminating "false information" about the actions of Russian authorities and the "special military operation in Ukraine", in addition to collaborating with other "foreign agents".

== Recognition ==
Nemzer's friend Julia Loktev filmed the experiences of Nemzer and her journalist colleagues in the period leading up to the Russian invasion of Ukraine; many of the journalists featured were introduced to Loktev by Nemzer. The footage was subsequently released as the documentary film My Undesirable Friends: Part I — Last Air in Moscow, with Nemzer credited as co-director. Nemzer appears in the film's 2026 sequel, My Undesirable Friends: Part II – Exile.
