= 2007 Independent Spirit Awards =

The 2007 Independent Spirit Awards can refer to:

- 22nd Independent Spirit Awards, a ceremony held in 2007, honoring the films of 2006
- 23rd Independent Spirit Awards, a ceremony held in 2008, honoring the films of 2007
