= Claire Dolan =

1998 film

- Directed by: Lodge Kerrigan
- Written by: Lodge Kerrigan
- Produced by: Ann Ruark
- Starring: Katrin Cartlidge; Vincent Philip D'Onofrio; Colm Meaney
- Cinematography: Teodoro Maniaci
- Edited by: Kristina Boden
- Music by: Simon Fisher Turner
- Release dates: May 1998 (Cannes); February 25, 2000 (United States)
- Running time: 95 minutes
- Countries: United States; France
- Language: English

Claire Dolan is a 1998 American-French drama film directed by Lodge Kerrigan and starring Katrin Cartlidge, Vincent D'Onofrio, and Colm Meaney. It premiered at the 1998 Cannes Film Festival and was given a limited release in the United States on February 25, 2000.

== Plot ==
Claire Dolan is an Irish immigrant in America and a sex worker. She does not enjoy the profession at all, but owes her pimp money and must continue to work. She goes to neighboring Newark, New Jersey, where she has a cousin. She takes a job in a salon and forms a relationship with her cousin and Siobhan.

Before long, she begins to receive suspicious phone calls; at work, she is called to the phone and when she answers there is no one on the line. At home in the middle of the night she receives another call. After hanging up, the phone rings again. She feels unsafe, that perhaps Roland has found her, and so she leaves her apartment and walks to a nearby bar. As soon as she walks in, she sits down at a man's table, asking if he is waiting for someone. When he says no, she asks him to dance with her. Claire and Elton dance for a few hours and we next see her waking up in his bed the next morning. It is apparent that she picked up someone to take her home with them, for a safe place to spend the night. When she arrives home, she feels something is out of place. He watches her speak to someone (Roland), then follows her to a hotel where she stays for quite some time, then gives up waiting.

At Dolan's apartment, there is a knock on her door. Elton confronts her about who she really is, where she lives, and asks if she has a pimp and if she owes him any money. Over the next few days/weeks, they go to work and meet afterward. Elton has feelings for her, and the two confess their love to each other. Elton goes to see Roland, who has been expecting him. Roland grabs the other man by the throat and tells him Claire always was and always will be a whore and that he should get out while he can.

It is implied she may be his own daughter. He also speaks with an Eastern European prostitute in a hotel room, but seems uninterested in having sex with her, and asks her some questions. He returns to the city. Claire has gone to the doctor and checks out okay. She continues to see a few clients, but during one visit, she thinks she sees Elton's reflection on the balcony outside and goes to the window, cracking it to look out. Her client comes into the room and has her leave it open for the air, and they carry on, with Elton on the balcony.

Now having enough money to pay off her debt, she goes to pay off Roland. He asks her if she is going to keep her baby, then congratulates her, offering her a packet of money "for the baby" but she refuses. He insists, but she continues to refuse his money as it would be something Roland could hold over her in the future. She goes home, packs a suitcase with an air of finality, and goes to the airport.

Elton is walking down the street with a blond woman when Roland passes by and stops him to say hello. Elton introduces the woman as his wife, and she and Roland talk for a moment. She is seven months pregnant with a girl.

== Cast ==
- Katrin Cartlidge as Claire Dolan
- Vincent D'Onofrio as Elton Garrett
- Colm Meaney as Roland Cain
- Patrick Husted as George
- Muriel Maida as Claire's Mum
- Maryann Plunkett as Mary Egan
- Sarah Rose Hendrickson as Siobhan, Mary's daughter

== Release ==
Claire Dolan premiered at the Cannes Film Festival in May 1998, and was given a limited release in the United States on February 25, 2000.

== Critical reception ==
In a review that gave 3 and 1/2 stars out of 4, Roger Ebert wrote Claire Dolan "is a film about a woman whose knowledge of men encompasses everything except how to trust them and find happiness with them", and that Kerrigan "accepts the challenge of central characters who do not let us know what they're thinking."

Stephen Holden of The New York Times wrote, "the movie devotes so much of its energy to building and sustaining a mood of urban desolation that the story never quite jells. Especially toward the end of the film, there are huge, frustrating gaps in the narrative." However, he praised "Cartlidge's beautifully still performance, mournful one moment, defiant the next, [that] lets you see into Claire's soul without editorializing or begging for our empathy."

== Accolades ==
The film received nominations for three Independent Spirit Awards, including Best Feature for producer Ann Ruark, Best Director for Kerrigan, and Best Female Lead for Cartlidge.

Simon Fisher Turner won the Georges Delerue Award for Best Soundtrack/Sound Design at Film Fest Gent in 1998.
