= Mary Beth Hurt =

American actress (1946–2026)

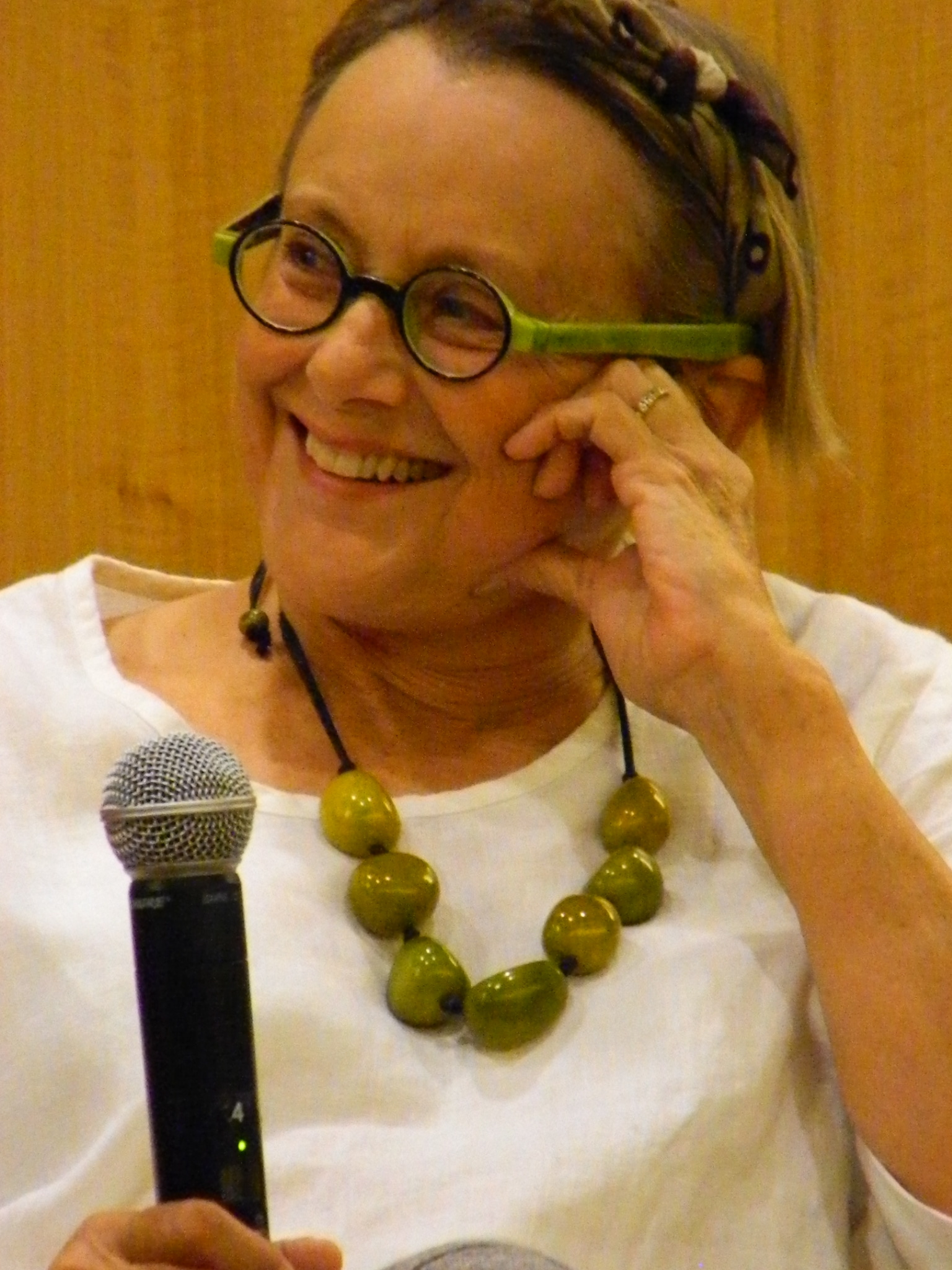
- Hurt in 2013
- Born: Mary Beth Supinger; September 26, 1946; Marshalltown, Iowa, U.S.
- Died: March 28, 2026 (aged 79); Jersey City, New Jersey, U.S.
- Education: University of Iowa (BA); New York University (MFA)
- Occupation: Actress
- Years active: 1974–2018
- Spouses: William Hurt (m. 1971; div. 1982); Paul Schrader (m. 1983)
- Children: 2

Mary Beth Hurt (née Supinger; September 26, 1946 – March 28, 2026) was an American actress of stage and screen. She was a three-time Tony Award-nominated actress, as well as a BAFTA Award and Independent Spirit Award nominee. Hurt was also the recipient of an Obie Award and a Clarence Derwent Award.

Notable films in which Hurt appears include Interiors (1978), The World According to Garp (1982), The Age of Innocence (1993), and Six Degrees of Separation (1993). She also collaborated with her husband, filmmaker Paul Schrader, in such films as Light Sleeper (1992) and Affliction (1997).

== Early life and education ==
Mary Beth Hurt was born Mary Beth Supinger in Marshalltown, Iowa, on September 26, 1946, the daughter of Delores Lenore (née Andre) and Forrest Clayton Supinger. Her childhood babysitter was actress Jean Seberg, also a Marshalltown native. Hurt studied drama at the University of Iowa and at New York University's Graduate Acting Program at the Tisch School of the Arts.

== Career ==
Hurt made her New York stage debut in 1974. She was nominated for three Tony Awards for her Broadway performances in Trelawny of the Wells, Crimes of the Heart (for which she won an Obie Award), and Benefactors.

She made her film debut in Woody Allen's dramatic film Interiors (1978) as Joey, the second of three sisters dealing with the emotional fallout of a family's disintegration and their mother Eve (Geraldine Page)'s descent into mental illness. Hurt's powerful turn in that film earned her a nomination for the BAFTA Award for Most Promising Newcomer to Leading Film Roles at the 32nd British Academy Film Awards. Her other film roles include Laura in Chilly Scenes of Winter (1979), Helen Holm Garp in The World According to Garp (1982), and Regina Beaufort in Martin Scorsese's The Age of Innocence (1993). Hurt also played Jean Seberg, in voiceover, in Mark Rappaport's 1995 documentary From the Journals of Jean Seberg.

Hurt was nominated for the Independent Spirit Award for Best Supporting Female at the 22nd Independent Spirit Awards, for her performance in the 2006 movie The Dead Girl. For her role in Crimes of the Heart (1981) she was nominated for a Drama Desk Award for Outstanding Actress in a Play and earned an Obie Award. In addition to these honors, Hurt also received a Clarence Derwent Award in 1975 for Best Supporting Female for her role in the Off-Broadway production of the play Love for Love.

== Personal life and death ==
Hurt was married to actor William Hurt from 1971 to 1982. She married filmmaker Paul Schrader in 1983; the couple had a daughter and a son. She was close friends with fellow actress Glenn Close, who had understudied her in the play Love for Love in 1974.

On February 11, 2023, Schrader announced that Hurt had been placed in memory care, a result of her advancing Alzheimer's disease.

Hurt died at an assisted-living facility in Jersey City, New Jersey, on March 28, 2026, at the age of 79.

== Acting credits ==
=== Film ===
Year	Title	Role	Notes
1978	Interiors	Joey	
1979	Chilly Scenes of Winter	Laura Connelly	
1980	A Change of Seasons	Kasey Evans	
1982	The World According to Garp	Helen Holm	
1985	D.A.R.Y.L.	Joyce Richardson	
1985	Compromising Positions	Peg Tuccio	
1989	Parents	Lily Laemle	
1989	Slaves of New York	Ginger Booth	
1991	Defenseless	Ellie Seldes	
1992	Light Sleeper	Teresa Aranow	
1993	My Boyfriend's Back	Mrs. Dingle	
1993	The Age of Innocence	Regina Beaufort	
1993	Shimmer	Mother	
1993	Six Degrees of Separation	Kitty	
1994	Noisy Nora	Narrator (voice)	Short film
1995	Alkali, Iowa	June	Short film
1997	Boys Life 2	June Gudmanson	
1997	Affliction	Lillian Whitehouse Horner	
1998	A Weekend with Wendell	Narrator (voice)	Short film
1999	Bringing Out the Dead	Nurse Constance	
1999	Leo the Late Bloomer	Narrator (voice)	Short film
2000	Autumn in New York	Dr. Sibley	
2000	The Family Man	Adelle	
2005	The Exorcism of Emily Rose	Judge Brewster	
2005	Perception	Dorothy	
2006	Lady in the Water	Mrs. Bell	
2006	The Dead Girl	Ruth	
2007	The Walker	Chrissie Morgan	
2008	Untraceable	Stella Marsh	
2010	Lebanon, Pa.	Jennette	
2011	Young Adult	Jan	
2013	The Volunteer	Donna	
2018	Change in the Air	Jo Ann Bayberry	

=== Television ===
Year	Title	Role	Notes
1974	Ann in Blue	Off. Elizabeth Jensen	TV film
1976	Kojak	Karen Foster	2 episodes
1977	Great Performances	Caroline Mitford	Episode: "Secret Service"
1979	The Five Forty-Eight	Jane Dent	TV film
1987	Baby Girl Scott	Wendy Scott	TV film
1988	Tattingers	Sheila Bradley	Episode: "Death and Taxis"
1990	Thirtysomething	Emily Dickinson	Episode: "I'm Nobody, Who Are You?"
1990	Working It Out	Andy	Main role (12 episodes)
1992	Saturday Night Live	Betsy	Episode: "Glenn Close/The Black Crowes"
1994	Monty	Adelaide	Episode: "The Brother of the Bride"
1996	Law & Order	Sela Dixon	Episode: "Deceit"
2000	The Beat	Eleanor	Episode: "Someone to Watch Over Me"
2001	No Ordinary Baby	Dr. Amanda Gordon	TV film
2002	Law & Order: Special Victims Unit	Jessica Blaine-Todd	Episode: "Greed"
2009	Law & Order	Judge Gillian Berrow	Episode: "Promote This!"

=== Theater ===
Year	Title	Role	Notes
1974	More Than You Deserve	Uncle Remus	
1974	Love for Love	Miss Prue	
1974	The Rules of the Game	Clara	Understudy
1975	Trelawny of the 'Wells'	Rose Trelawny	
1975	The Member of the Wedding	Frankie Addams	
1976	Boy Meets Girl	Susie	
1976	Secret Service	Caroline Mitford	
1977	The Cherry Orchard	Anya Ranevskaya	
1981	Crimes of the Heart	Meg MaGrath	
1983	The Misanthrope	Célimène	
1984	The Nest of the Wood Grouse	Iskra	
1985–1986	Benefactors	Sheila	
1989	The Secret Rapture	Katherine Glass	
1993	One Shoe Off	Dinah	
1996	A Delicate Balance	Julia	
2000	Old Money	Saulina Webb / Sally Webster	
2008	Top Girls	Louise / Waitress	
2010	When the Rain Stops Falling	Elizabeth Law	
2011	The House of Blue Leaves	Head Nun	
