= Taisiya Bekbulatova =

Russian journalist

- Таисия Бекбулатова
- Education: Moscow State University
- Occupation: journalist
- Known for: Holod Media

Taisiya Lvovna Bekbulatova (Russian: Таи́сия Льво́вна Бекбула́това) is a Russian journalist. In 2019 she founded her own on-line magazine Holod Media which won awards. In 2020 she was arrested on the same day as Ivan Safronov. She was declared a foreign agent in Russia and she moved herself and her fellow journalists out of Russia when "fake" news became illegal. In 2022 she was named as one of the BBC's 100 Women.

== Life ==
Bekbulatova studied journalism at Moscow State University. She was an intern at the Kommersant Russian daily newspaper in her fourth year. Her journalism professor, Lyudmila Resnyanskaya, encouraged her to be a political journalist.

In 2012 she began working as a correspondent for the politics department at Kommersant. In 2017 she became a special correspondent for the online publication Meduza, where she wrote and edited concerning both political and non-political subjects until 2019.

She launched her own on-line magazine Holod Media in 2019. The first major story was the coverage of her three month long investigation of a serial murderer and rapist who had evaded capture. Dmitry Lebed was a taxi driver from Abakan in the remote region of Khakassia and he had been arrested several times and then released to continue his crimes. Women who had survived his attacks were turned away by the police and denied justice and their ability to implicate him. The "Road to Askiz" story was published in August 2019 and it won Holod's first award from Redkollegia. She soon gathered a team of other journalists.

Russian officials who were investigating Ivan Safronov searched her home in July 2020. Safronov had been arrested on the same day because he was suspected of being a traitor. Pavel Chikov who had been contacted by her when the officials arrived said that she was taken in for questioning and her lawyer, Nikolai Vasilyev, was not allowed to be present. At the end of 2021 she was labelled as a foreign agent by the Russian Ministry of Justice and she moved to Tbilisi.

Her magazine published news about the 2022 Russian invasion of Ukraine. In 2022 the Russian state passed new laws that made it illegal to publish "fake" news. Her journalists would face prison terms of up to fifteen years for infringing these laws. The Committee to Protect Journalists said that journalists were emigrating in "droves" to avoid the new censorship. Bekbulatova estimated that 150 had gone and about twelve of her staff had already left the country. She said that they were breaking contact with journalists who decided to stay in Russia to support their safety.

In 2022 the BBC included her with two other Russian women in their 100 Women. The BBC cited her coverage of women's rights and the Russian invasion of Ukraine. She was quoted saying "...And women's rights are usually the first to vanish."
