= Dmitry Talantov =

Russian defence lawyer and dissident

Dmitry Talantov (born 29 December 1960; full name Dmitry Nikolayevich Talantov) is a Russian lawyer specialising in criminal law and criminal procedure, and was President of the Bar Association of the Udmurt Republic of the Russian Federation. He was the first Russian lawyer convicted under Article 207.3 of the Criminal Code of the Russian Federation covering the dissemination of knowingly fake information about the actions of the Armed Forces of the Russian Federation. The criminal case against Talantov was widely covered in international media, with the Memorial Human Rights Centre recognising him as a political prisoner and Amnesty International recognising him as a prisoner of conscience.

== Birth and career ==
Talantov was born on 29 December 1960 and was a resident of Izhevsk in the Udmurt Republic. He graduated from a specialised mathematics school, and then from Udmurt State University with a law degree. He started his career as a lawyer in the 1980s, working as a judge for several years in the late 1980s before returning to the bar again, and was the President of the Bar Association of the Udmurt Republic from 2002.

Talantov is married to another lawyer, named Olga.

== Ivan Safronov case ==
In August 2021 Talantov became the lawyer for Ivan Safronov, an adviser to the head of Roscosmos and former journalist who had been charged with high treason. The Russian Federal Security Service (FSB) alleged that Safronov had passed information on Russia's military and technical co-operation with African countries to Western intelligence agencies, as well as information on the activities of the Russian Armed Forces in the Middle East. Talantov became Safronov's lawyer after the advocate status of the human rights activist and lawyer who had previously defended Safronov, Ivan Pavlov, was suspended after allegations that Pavlov was a foreign agent. Criminal proceedings were later instigated against Pavlov.

== Charged for Facebook posts ==
Early in 2022 Talantov posted a photo of a man standing in Red Square on Facebook. The man was holding a placard that read "'Ukraine - peace. Russia - sanity, horror, shame, repentance. Putin - hell.", which Talantov captioned: "And how can it be different after the photos and videos from Kharkiv, Mariupol, Irpen, Bucha???? This is no longer fascism - these are extreme Nazi practices! If after this the majority of my compatriots support the murderer Putin and his gang - I personally refuse to recognise them as human beings. People have the quality of compassion. And these people are just stupid and evil scum."

Talantov had previously faced administrative proceedings for "discrediting" the Russian armed forces in an earlier post, where he wrote that supporters of war have no place at the bar. Those proceedings had started after he was denounced by lawyer Violetta Volkova, and on 12 April 2022 the blogger Roman Skomorokhov posted screenshots of Talantov's Facebook posts on the Military Review website and promised to write appeals for prosecution to the Prosecutor General's Office and the FSB Department of Udmurtia. The result was that Talantov was charged with criminal offences under Article 207.3 of the Criminal Code of the Russian Federation, accused of: "Public dissemination of knowingly fake information about the use of the Armed Forces of the Russian Federation, the execution by state bodies of the Russian Federation of their powers, the provision of assistance by volunteer formations, organisations or persons in the performance of tasks assigned to the Armed Forces of the Russian Federation or the National Guard troops of the Russian Federation."

On 29 June 2022, in justifying the arrest, Judge Sergei Khomyakov stressed that Talantov was a lawyer and therefore knew the intricacies of the law enforcement system and so could "continue criminal activity" or go into hiding using his experience as a lawyer if he was not held in custody until his trial. Thus a precedent had now been set in Russia whereby just the fact of being a lawyer was additional grounds for a preventive measure such as arrest rather than a non-custodial measure.

At his trial in November 2024 the prosecution requested Talantov receive twelve years' imprisonment. He was eventually sentenced to seven years in prison.

== Context of Article 207.3 ==
Criminal liability for publishing fake information about the Russian army was introduced against the backdrop of Russia's armed invasion of Ukraine in 2022, and was amended twice during the first year after its adoption. The punishments available for the various crimes described in Article 207.3 ranged from "a fine in an amount of from three million to five million roubles" to "imprisonment for a term of ten to fifteen years with deprivation of the right to hold certain posts or to engage in certain activities for a term of up to five years". As such, the punishment for a non-violent offence under Article 207.3 can be comparable in time and severity to the punishment for offences such as murder and robbery.

Talantov's case also highlighted how Article 207.3 is applied outside the traditional categories of guilt and causal link in Russian criminal law. Talantov was accused of disseminating fake information contrary to the official data of the Ministry of Defence, but as Talantov's lawyers pointed out, the position of the Ministry of Defence on these issues had not been made public at the time of Talantov's Facebook posts and hence could not have been known to him. As Talantov put it during the court hearing: "How could I make knowingly fake, discrediting statements that do not correspond to the information of the Ministry of Defence, if the positions of the Ministry of Defence have not been published yet?" Thus, according to the international human rights association Memorial, Article 207.3 contradicts both the Russian Constitution and the international obligations of the Russian Federation, as well as basic principles of law.

Talantov also pointed out that none of the text materials for which he was being held criminally liable contained any information, including knowingly false information, about the use of the Russian Armed Forces on the territory of Ukraine.

== Support for Talantov ==
The UN Special Rapporteur on Human Rights in the Russian Federation, Mariana Katzarova, called for Talantov's acquittal, stating that he should be immediately released and any charges against him dropped. She pointed out that such actions as non-violent expression of one's own opinion or dissent against war are protected under international human rights law. Criminalisation of such actions under the so-called "military censorship" law of Article 207.3, the sole purpose of which is to silence dissent in Russia, violates those human rights laws and should be urgently repealed. Similar demands were made by the European Parliament, the International Association of Russian Advocates, the Russian Helsinki Group, Amnesty International, and the Human Rights Commission of the AP SPB. The International Bar Association (IBA) also made a statement that Talantov should be released immediately, and the Pet Shop Boys also called for his release.

In a similar Article 207.3 criminal case against municipal deputy Alexei Gorinov, a number of prominent Russian lawyers called for the Article to be repealed as unconstitutional, stating in their appeal: "Article 207.3 of the Criminal Code is completely inconsistent with the rules of the Constitution – in particular, its Articles 13 (recognising ideological and political diversity as the basis of Russia's constitutional order), 28 (freedom to choose, have, and disseminate one's beliefs and act in accordance with them), 29 (freedom of thought and speech; prohibition of coercion to renounce one's beliefs; prohibition of censorship), and 54 (prohibition of arbitrary criminal prosecution)." They argued that this and Article 280.3 of the Criminal Code and Article 20.3.3 of the Code of Administrative Offenses are explicitly aimed at and used to suppress criticism and free competition of opinions about the use of the Armed Forces of the Russian Federation and the policies pursued by the state. In essence, they argued, they are a reincarnation of some of the worst elements of the Soviet repressive apparatus.

A group of lawyers and municipal deputies from Moscow later applied to the Constitutional Court of the Russian Federation to determine whether Article 207.3 of the Criminal Code was constitutional or not, but the Court indicated that, in relation to complaints about administrative liability: "The introduction of administrative liability for defamation during a military operation cannot be doubted."
