= Independent Spirit Award for Best Film =

Annual US film award

- Awarded for: Best Independent Film
- Country: United States
- Presented by: Film Independent
- First award: 1985
- Currently held by: Train Dreams (2025)
- Website: filmindependent.org

The Independent Spirit Award for Best Film (or Best Feature) is one of the annual Independent Spirit Awards, presented to recognize the best in independent filmmaking, it was first awarded in 1985 with Martin Scorsese's film After Hours being the first recipient of the award.

== Criteria ==
In order to be considered an independent film and therefore be eligible for this category, nomination committees base their decision on four criteria: "uniqueness of vision, original, provocative subject matter, percentage of financing from independent sources and economy of means"; the latter refers to a budget ceiling of $22.5 million. In 2022, Film Independent increased the budget cap for eligible films to $30 million to account for the rising cost of production.

In the following lists, the first titles listed are winners. These are also in bold and in blue background; those not in bold are nominees.

== Winners and nominees ==
=== 1980s ===
Year	Winner	Director(s)	Distributing company(s)
1985	**After Hours**	**Martin Scorsese**	**The Geffen Film Company/Warner Bros.**
1985	Blood Simple	Joel Coen	Circle Films
1985	Smooth Talk	Joyce Chopra	Goldcrest Films
1985	The Trip to Bountiful	Peter Masterson	Island Pictures
1986	**Platoon**	**Oliver Stone**	**Orion Pictures**
1986	Blue Velvet	David Lynch	De Laurentiis Entertainment Group
1986	Down by Law	Jim Jarmusch	Island Pictures
1986	On Valentine's Day	Ken Harrison	Angelika Films
1986	Salvador	Oliver Stone	Hemdale Film Corporation
1986	Stand by Me	Rob Reiner	Columbia Pictures
1987	**River's Edge**	**Tim Hunter**	**Island Pictures**
1987	The Big Easy	Jim McBride	Columbia Pictures
1987	The Dead	John Huston	Vestron Pictures
1987	Matewan	John Sayles	Cinecom Pictures
1987	Swimming to Cambodia	Jonathan Demme	Cinecom Pictures
1987	Tough Guys Don't Dance	Norman Mailer	The Cannon Group, Inc.
1988	**Stand and Deliver**	**Ramon Menendez**	**American Playhouse/Warner Bros.**
1988	Hairspray	John Waters	New Line Cinema
1988	Patti Rocks	David Burton Morris	FilmDallas Pictures
1988	The Thin Blue Line	Errol Morris	Miramax Films
1988	Torch Song Trilogy	Paul Bogart	New Line Cinema
1989	**Sex, Lies, and Videotape**	**Steven Soderbergh**	**Miramax Films**
1989	Drugstore Cowboy	Gus Van Sant	International Video Entertainment
1989	Heat and Sunlight	Rob Nilsson	Silverlight Pictures
1989	Mystery Train	Jim Jarmusch	Orion Classics
1989	True Love	Nancy Savoca	United Artists

=== 1990s ===
Year	Winner	Director(s)	Distributing company(s)
1990	**The Grifters**	**Stephen Frears**	**Miramax Films**
1990	Henry: Portrait of a Serial Killer	John McNaughton	Greycat Films
1990	The Plot Against Harry	Michael Roemer	New Yorker Films
1990	Pump Up the Volume	Allan Moyle	New Line Cinema
1990	To Sleep with Anger	Charles Burnett	The Samuel Goldwyn Company
1991	**Rambling Rose**	**Martha Coolidge**	**New Line/Seven Arts**
1991	City of Hope	John Sayles	The Samuel Goldwyn Company
1991	Hangin' with the Homeboys	Joseph Vasquez	New Line Cinema
1991	Homicide	David Mamet	Triumph Films
1991	My Own Private Idaho	Gus Van Sant	Fine Line Features
1992	**The Player**	**Robert Altman**	**Fine Line Features**
1992	Bad Lieutenant	Abel Ferrara	Aries Films
1992	Gas Food Lodging	Allison Anders	Cineville
1992	Mississippi Masala	Mira Nair	The Samuel Goldwyn Company
1992	One False Move	Carl Franklin	I.R.S. Releasing
1993	**Short Cuts**	**Robert Altman**	**Fine Line Features**
1993	Equinox	Alan Rudolph	IRS Media
1993	Much Ado About Nothing	Kenneth Branagh	The Samuel Goldwyn Company
1993	Ruby in Paradise	Victor Nuñez	October Films
1993	The Wedding Banquet	Ang Lee	The Samuel Goldwyn Company
1994	**Pulp Fiction**	**Quentin Tarantino**	**Miramax Films**
1994	Bullets over Broadway	Woody Allen	Miramax Films
1994	Eat Drink Man Woman	Ang Lee	The Samuel Goldwyn Company
1994	Mrs. Parker and the Vicious Circle	Alan Rudolph	Fine Line Features
1994	Wes Craven's New Nightmare	Wes Craven	New Line Cinema
1995	**Leaving Las Vegas**	**Mike Figgis**	**United Artists**
1995	The Addiction	Abel Ferrara	October Films
1995	Living in Oblivion	Tom DiCillo	Sony Pictures Classics
1995	Safe	Todd Haynes	Sony Pictures Classics
1995	The Secret of Roan Inish	John Sayles	Sony Pictures Classics
1996	**Fargo**	**Joel Coen**	**Gramercy Pictures**
1996	Dead Man	Jim Jarmusch	Miramax Films
1996	The Funeral	Abel Ferrara	October Films
1996	Lone Star	John Sayles	Sony Pictures Classics
1996	Welcome to the Dollhouse	Todd Solondz	Sony Pictures Classics
1997	**The Apostle**	**Robert Duvall**	**October Films**
1997	Chasing Amy	Kevin Smith	Miramax Films
1997	Loved	Erin Dignam	MDP Worldwide
1997	Ulee's Gold	Victor Nuñez	Orion Pictures
1997	Waiting for Guffman	Christopher Guest	Sony Pictures Classics
1998	**Gods and Monsters**	**Bill Condon**	**Lionsgate Films**
1998	Affliction	Paul Schrader	Lionsgate Films
1998	Claire Dolan	Lodge Kerrigan	New Yorker Films
1998	A Soldier's Daughter Never Cries	James Ivory	October Films
1998	Velvet Goldmine	Todd Haynes	Miramax Films
1999	**Election**	**Alexander Payne**	**Paramount Pictures/MTV Films**
1999	Cookie's Fortune	Robert Altman	October Films
1999	The Limey	Steven Soderbergh	Artisan Entertainment
1999	The Straight Story	David Lynch	Walt Disney Pictures
1999	Sugar Town	Allison Anders and Kurt Voss	October Films/USA Films

=== 2000s ===
Year	Winner	Director(s)	Distributing company(s)
2000	**Crouching Tiger, Hidden Dragon**	**Ang Lee**	**Sony Pictures Classics**
2000	Before Night Falls	Julian Schnabel	Fine Line Features
2000	George Washington	David Gordon Green	ContentFilm International
2000	Ghost Dog: The Way of the Samurai	Jim Jarmusch	Artisan Entertainment
2000	Requiem for a Dream	Darren Aronofsky	Artisan Entertainment
2001	**Memento**	**Christopher Nolan**	**Newmarket Films**
2001	Hedwig and the Angry Inch	John Cameron Mitchell	Fine Line Features
2001	L.I.E.	Michael Cuesta	New Yorker Films
2001	Things Behind the Sun	Allison Anders	Showtime Networks
2001	Waking Life	Richard Linklater	Fox Searchlight
2002	**Far from Heaven**	**Todd Haynes**	**Focus Features**
2002	The Good Girl	Miguel Arteta	Fox Searchlight
2002	Lovely & Amazing	Nicole Holofcener	Lionsgate Films
2002	Secretary	Steven Shainberg	Lionsgate Films
2002	Tully	Hilary Birmingham	Small Planet Pictures
2003	**Lost in Translation**	**Sofia Coppola**	**Focus Features**
2003	American Splendor	Shari Springer Berman and Robert Pulcini	Fine Line Features/HBO Films
2003	In America	Jim Sheridan	Fox Searchlight
2003	Raising Victor Vargas	Peter Sollett	Samuel Goldwyn Films
2003	Shattered Glass	Billy Ray	Lions Gate Films
2004	**Sideways**	**Alexander Payne**	**Fox Searchlight**
2004	Baadasssss!	Mario Van Peebles	Sony Pictures Classics
2004	Kinsey	Bill Condon	Fox Searchlight
2004	Maria Full of Grace	Joshua Marston	Fine Line Features
2004	Primer	Shane Carruth	THINKFilm
2005	**Brokeback Mountain**	**Ang Lee**	**Focus Features**
2005	Capote	Bennett Miller	Sony Pictures Classics
2005	Good Night, and Good Luck	George Clooney	Warner Independent Pictures
2005	The Squid and the Whale	Noah Baumbach	Samuel Goldwyn Films
2005	The Three Burials of Melquiades Estrada	Tommy Lee Jones	Sony Pictures Classics
2006	**Little Miss Sunshine**	**Jonathan Dayton and Valerie Faris**	**Fox Searchlight**
2006	American Gun	Aric Avelino	IFC Films
2006	The Dead Girl	Karen Moncrieff	First Look International
2006	Half Nelson	Ryan Fleck	THINKFilm
2006	Pan's Labyrinth	Guillermo del Toro	Picturehouse
2007	**Juno**	**Jason Reitman**	**Fox Searchlight**
2007	The Diving Bell and the Butterfly	Julian Schnabel	Miramax Films
2007	I'm Not There	Todd Haynes	The Weinstein Company
2007	A Mighty Heart	Michael Winterbottom	Paramount Vantage
2007	Paranoid Park	Gus Van Sant	IFC Films
2008	**The Wrestler**	**Darren Aronofsky**	**Fox Searchlight**
2008	Ballast	Lance Hammer	Alluvial Film Company
2008	Frozen River	Courtney Hunt	Sony Pictures Classics
2008	Rachel Getting Married	Jonathan Demme	Sony Pictures Classics
2008	Wendy and Lucy	Kelly Reichardt	Oscilloscope Pictures
2009	**Precious**	**Lee Daniels**	**Lionsgate**
2009	(500) Days of Summer	Marc Webb	Fox Searchlight
2009	Amreeka	Cherien Dabis	National Geographic Entertainment
2009	The Last Station	Michael Hoffman	Sony Pictures Classics
2009	Sin Nombre	Cary Fukunaga	Focus Features

=== 2010s ===
Year	Winner	Director(s)	Distributing company(s)
2010	**Black Swan**	**Darren Aronofsky**	**Fox Searchlight**
2010	127 Hours	Danny Boyle	Fox Searchlight
2010	Greenberg	Noah Baumbach	Focus Features
2010	The Kids Are All Right	Lisa Cholodenko	Focus Features
2010	Winter's Bone	Debra Granik	Roadside Attractions
2011	**The Artist**	**Michel Hazanavicius**	**The Weinstein Company**
2011	50/50	Jonathan Levine	Summit Entertainment
2011	Beginners	Mike Mills	Focus Features
2011	The Descendants	Alexander Payne	Fox Searchlight
2011	Drive	Nicolas Winding Refn	FilmDistrict
2011	Take Shelter	Jeff Nichols	Sony Pictures Classics
2012	**Silver Linings Playbook**	**David O. Russell**	**The Weinstein Company**
2012	Beasts of the Southern Wild	Benh Zeitlin	Fox Searchlight
2012	Bernie	Richard Linklater	Millennium Entertainment
2012	Keep the Lights On	Ira Sachs	Music Box Films
2012	Moonrise Kingdom	Wes Anderson	Focus Features
2013	**12 Years a Slave**	**Steve McQueen**	**Fox Searchlight**
2013	All Is Lost	J. C. Chandor	Lionsgate
2013	Frances Ha	Noah Baumbach	IFC Films
2013	Inside Llewyn Davis	Joel Coen and Ethan Coen	CBS Films
2013	Nebraska	Alexander Payne	Paramount Vantage
2014	**Birdman or (The Unexpected Virtue of Ignorance)**	**Alejandro G. Iñárritu**	**Fox Searchlight**
2014	Boyhood	Richard Linklater	IFC Films
2014	Love Is Strange	Ira Sachs	Sony Pictures Classics
2014	Selma	Ava DuVernay	Paramount Pictures
2014	Whiplash	Damien Chazelle	Sony Pictures Classics
2015	**Spotlight**	**Tom McCarthy**	**Open Road Films**
2015	Anomalisa	Charlie Kaufman and Duke Johnson	Paramount Pictures
2015	Beasts of No Nation	Cary Joji Fukunaga	Bleecker Street/Netflix
2015	Carol	Todd Haynes	The Weinstein Company
2015	Tangerine	Sean Baker	Magnolia Pictures
2016	**Moonlight**	**Barry Jenkins**	**A24**
2016	American Honey	Andrea Arnold	A24
2016	Chronic	Michel Franco	Monument Releasing
2016	Jackie	Pablo Larraín	Fox Searchlight
2016	Manchester by the Sea	Kenneth Lonergan	Amazon Studios/Roadside Attractions
2017	**Get Out**	**Jordan Peele**	**Universal Pictures/Blumhouse Productions**
2017	Call Me by Your Name	Luca Guadagnino	Sony Pictures Classics
2017	The Florida Project	Sean Baker	A24
2017	Lady Bird	Greta Gerwig	A24
2017	The Rider	Chloé Zhao	Sony Pictures Classics
2018	**If Beale Street Could Talk**	**Barry Jenkins**	**Annapurna Pictures**
2018	Eighth Grade	Bo Burnham	A24
2018	First Reformed	Paul Schrader	A24
2018	Leave No Trace	Debra Granik	Bleecker Street
2018	You Were Never Really Here	Lynne Ramsay	Amazon Studios
2019	**The Farewell**	**Lulu Wang**	**A24**
2019	A Hidden Life	Terrence Malick	Fox Searchlight
2019	Clemency	Chinonye Chukwu	Neon
2019	Marriage Story	Noah Baumbach	Netflix
2019	Uncut Gems	Benny Safdie and Joshua Safdie	A24

=== 2020s ===
Year	Winner	Director(s)	Distributing company(s)
2020	**Nomadland**	**Chloé Zhao**	**Searchlight Pictures**
2020	First Cow	Kelly Reichardt	A24
2020	Ma Rainey's Black Bottom	George C. Wolfe	Netflix
2020	Minari	Lee Isaac Chung	A24
2020	Never Rarely Sometimes Always	Eliza Hittman	Focus Features
2021	**The Lost Daughter**	**Maggie Gyllenhaal**	**Netflix**
2021	A Chiara	Jonas Carpignano	Neon
2021	C’mon C’mon	Mike Mills	A24
2021	The Novice	Lauren Hadaway	IFC Films
2021	Zola	Janicza Bravo	A24
2022	**Everything Everywhere All at Once**	**Daniel Kwan and Daniel Scheinert**	**A24**
2022	Bones and All	Luca Guadagnino	MGM/United Artists Releasing
2022	Our Father, the Devil	Ellie Foumbi	Resolve Media
2022	Tár	Todd Field	Focus Features
2022	Women Talking	Sarah Polley	MGM/United Artists Releasing
2023	**Past Lives**	**Celine Song**	**A24**
2023	All of Us Strangers	Andrew Haigh	Searchlight Pictures
2023	American Fiction	Cord Jefferson	Orion Pictures/Amazon MGM Studios
2023	May December	Todd Haynes	Netflix
2023	Passages	Ira Sachs	Mubi
2023	We Grown Now	Minhal Baig	Sony Pictures Classics
2024	**Anora**	**Sean Baker**	**Neon**
2024	I Saw the TV Glow	Jane Schoenbrun	A24
2024	Nickel Boys	RaMell Ross	Orion Pictures/Amazon MGM Studios
2024	Sing Sing	Greg Kwedar	A24
2024	The Substance	Coralie Fargeat	Mubi
2025	**Train Dreams**	**Clint Bentley**	**Netflix**
2025	Peter Hujar's Day	Ira Sachs	Janus Films/Sideshow
2025	The Plague	Charlie Polinger	Independent Film Company
2025	Sorry, Baby	Eva Victor	A24
2025	Twinless	James Sweeney	Lionsgate Films/Roadside Attractions

== Distributors with most wins and nominations (2 or more) ==
- Columbia/Sony Pictures Classics - 20 (one win)
- Fox Searchlight/Searchlight Pictures - 17 (eight wins)
- A24 - 15 (four wins)
- Universal/Focus Features - 13 (four wins)
- Miramax - 9 (three wins)
- Samuel Goldwyn - 8 (no wins)
- Lionsgate - 8 (two wins)
- Fine Line Features - 7 (two wins)
- October Films - 7 (one win)
- IFC Films - 6 (no wins)
- MGM/United Artists/Amazon - 6 (one win)
- New Line Cinema - 6 (one win)
- Netflix - 6 (two wins)
- Paramount/Paramount Vantage - 5 (one win)
- The Weinstein Company - 4 (two wins)
- Orion Pictures - 4 (one win)
- Warner Bros/Warner Independent Films - 3 (two wins)
- Island Pictures - 3 (one win)
- Neon - 3 (one win)
- Artisan Entertainment - 3 (no wins)
- New Yorker Films - 3 (no wins)
- Bleecker Street - 2 (no wins)
- Mubi - 2 (no wins)
