= Sonya Groysman =

Russian journalist (born 1995)

- Соня Гройсман
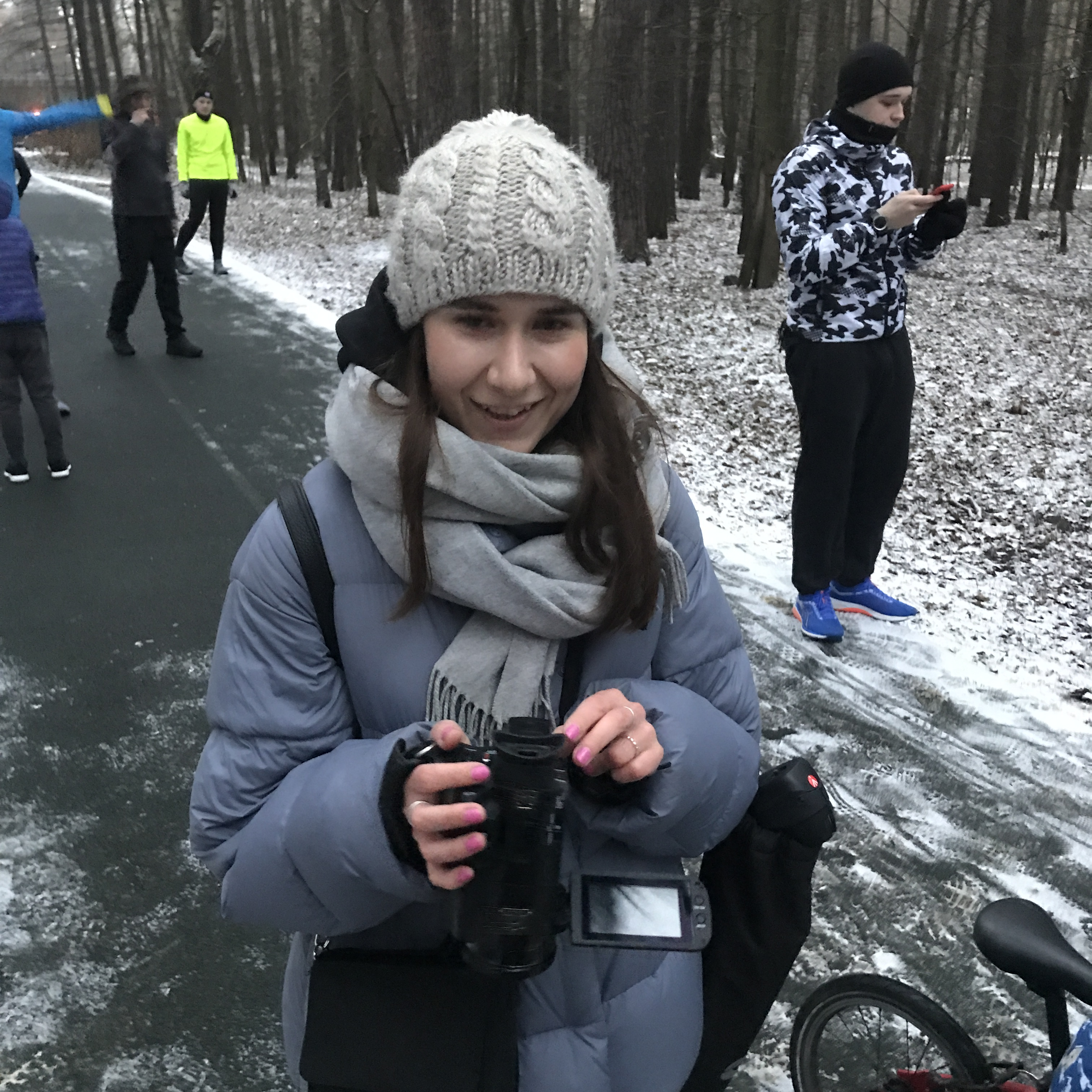
- Groysman in 2019
- Born: 13 April 1995 (age 31); Novosibirsk, Novosibirsk Oblast, Russia
- Education: Moscow State University
- Occupation: Journalist
- Employer(s): Proekt; TV Rain
- Awards: Redkollegia (2021, 2023)

Sonya Romanovna Groysman (Russian: Соня Романовна Гройсман; born 13 April 1995) is a Russian journalist. After working for independent media outlets including Proekt and TV Rain, Groysman was among the first Russian journalists to be labelled as a foreign agent by the Russian government, severely impacting her ability to work in Russia. Following this, she created the podcast Hello, You're a Foreign Agent, alongside fellow journalist Olga Churakova, detailing their experiences.

== Early life and education ==
Groysman was born on 13 April 1995 in Novosibirsk, Novosibirsk Oblast. She studied journalism at Moscow State University.

== Journalism career ==
After graduating, Groysman worked for the independent media outlets Proekt and TV Rain, where she focused on directing video documentaries.

On 15 July 2021, Russian authorities formally banned Proekt as an "undesirable organisation", and classified several of its journalists, including Groysman, as being "foreign agents". Following this, she and Olga Churakova, a fellow journalist deemed to be a foreign agent, started the podcast Hello, You're a Foreign Agent (Russian: Привет, ты иноагент, romanized: Privet, ty inoagent), in which they documented how being labelled foreign agents had impacted their daily lives and careers. Groysman later challenged her designation in court, though the judge refused to remove her status. On 21 August, Groysman was arrested while participating in a solo picket of the Federal Security Service building in Moscow against the banning of Proekt and iStories, another independent news outlet. Groysman recorded the arrest and later used its footage and audio in an episode of Hello, You're a Foreign Agent.

In 2022, following the Russian invasion of Ukraine and the subsequent closure of TV Rain on 1 March, Groysman left Russia for Turkey.

In 2023, Hello, You're a Foreign Agent aired a special series entitled "Sisters" (Russian: Сёстры, romanized: Syostry), featuring eight episodes focused on Russian women who were against the Russo-Ukrainian war whose brothers had been deployed to the frontline. This led to the podcast being recognised as one of the best podcasts of 2023 by Meduza and won Groysman and Churakova a Redkollegia; they had previously won the award in 2021 for an episode about the Russian Wikipedia.

Hello, You're a Foreign Agent was banned from Russia-based podcast plaforms such as Yandex Music. In 2023, Roskomnadzor banned the podcast after concluding that the "Sisters" series included "unrealiable information" that was "destabilising the socio-political situation". In May 2024, Groysman was charged after failing to declare her status as a foreign agent at the beginning of an episode of Hello, You're a Foreign Agent.

== Recognition ==
In 2022, Groysman was nominated for the Index on Censorship's Freedom of Expression Award. In 2024, Groysman was part of the Nieman Foundation for Journalism's Class of 2024.

In 2024, Groysman was featured in the documentary My Undesirable Friends: Part I — Last Air in Moscow. She also appeared in its 2026 sequel, My Undesirable Friends: Part II – Exile.
