= Ksenia Mironova =

Russian journalist (born 1998)

Ksenia Mironova (Russian: Ксения Миронова; born 1998) is a Russian independent journalist. After working for the newspapers Kommersant and Meduza, she became more widely known as a journalist for the independent news outlet TV Rain until it was shut down by the Russian government in 2022.

== Personal life ==
Mironova was born and raised in Uralmash, a neighborhood of Yekaterinburg in Sverdlovsk Oblast, Russia.

Mironova is engaged to journalist and political prisoner Ivan Safronov, whom she met when they both worked for Kommersant in its Moscow office. On 7 July 2020, Safronov was arrested at their home on charges of treason. After being detained for over two years, on 5 September 2022 Safronov was sentenced to 22 years in prison after allegedly sharing information with intelligence services in Czechia and Germany in what was widely considered to be a politically motivated trial.

== Journalism career and activism ==
Prior to 2018, Mironova had moved to Saint Petersburg, where she had freelanced for Russian media outlets including Kommersant. In 2018, she moved to Moscow to intern at Kommersant, and later received a permanent position reporting on education; she also frequently wrote about the experiences of political prisoners. In 2019, Mironova's fiancé Safronov was fired from Kommersant, which led to the resignation of the newspaper's entire politics desk. Mironova worked for the outlet Meduza for a while before becoming a journalist and presenter on the independent news channel TV Rain.

Mironova remained with TV Rain until it was declared to be an "undesirable organisation" and shut down by Russian authorities on 1 March 2022, shortly after the Russian invasion of Ukraine. Mironova left Russia the next day, residing in Georgia, Latvia and Germany before settling in the United States as of 2025. She has since worked as an independent journalist outside of Russia, including for the publication Sluzhba podderzhka, where she reports on the Russo-Ukrainian war. Mironova also works for the organisation Help Desk, that provides assistance to political prisoners and provides factual information about the war.

Mironova founded an organisation to support the families of Russian political prisoners, as well as Ukrainian detainees, called Help for the Relatives of Political Prisoners (Russian: Помощь близким политзаключённых, romanized: Pomoshch blizkim politzaklyuchyonnykh). She hosts the organisation's podcast, There Will Be No More Time (Времени больше не будет, Vremeni bolshe ne budet), where she interviews the relatives of political prisoners, such as the mother of Ilya Yashin and the wife of Oleksandr Marchenko. Mironova also hosted the Radio Svoboda podcast Hello, Where Are You? (Привет, ты где?, Privet, ty gde?) in which she interviewed people who had left Russia following the outbreak of the war.

Alongside her TV Rain colleague Anna Nemzer, Mironova works with the Russian Independent Media Outlet, which aims to preserve Russian independent media.

== Recognition ==
Mironova is significantly featured in the 2024 documentary My Undesirable Friends: Part I — Last Air in Moscow, which premiered at the Berlin International Film Festival. She also appears in its 2026 sequel, My Undesirable Friends: Part II – Exile, which premiered at the Venice Film Festival.
