= My Undesirable Friends: Part I — Last Air in Moscow =

2025 documentary film by Julia Loktev

- Promotional poster
- Directed by: Julia Loktev
- Screenplay by: Julia Loktev
- Produced by: Julia Loktev; Michael Taylor
- Starring: Anna Nemzer; Ksenia Mironova; Sonya Groysman; Olga Churakova; Irina Dolinina; Alesya Marokhovskaya
- Cinematography: Julia Loktev
- Edited by: Julia Loktev; Michael Taylor
- Music by: Sami Buccella
- Production company: Marminchilla
- Distributed by: Mubi
- Release dates: 13 October 2024 (NYFF); 20 February 2025 (Berlinale); 3 April 2026 (United States)
- Running time: 324 minutes
- Country: United States
- Language: Russian

My Undesirable Friends: Part I — Last Air in Moscow is a 2024 Russian-language American documentary film produced, written and directed by Julia Loktev. It follows the persistence of several independent Russian journalists to keep doing their jobs in the months leading up to the full-scale invasion of Ukraine, as the Putin government's repression of free speech builds.

The documentary premiered at the 2024 New York Film Festival in the Main Slate section on October 13, 2024. It had its international premiere at the 75th Berlin International Film Festival in Berlinale Special section on 20 February 2025. At the Gotham Independent Film Awards 2025, it won Best Documentary Feature. It was also shortlisted for Best Documentary Feature at the 98th Academy Awards, but was not nominated.

It was released globally by Mubi on April 3, 2026. A sequel, My Undesirable Friends: Part II – Exile, is currently in post-production and is also expected to be released by Mubi globally.

== Summary ==
The documentary follows several journalists, mostly young women, during the fall and winter of 2021–2022. They and the outlet they work for, TV Rain, have been labeled "foreign agents" or "undesirable" by Putin's regime, which requires TV Rain to label all its reporting with a statement that the channel is serving foreign powers. While the staff meet the designation with dark humor, it means that they are increasingly subject to government surveillance and harassment. Most of the journalists try to continue living relatively normal lives as they report truthfully on Russian politics and the buildup of Russian troops on the Ukraine border, even as police crackdowns and arrests intensify.

== Cast ==
- Anna Nemzer
- Ksenia Mironova
- Sonya Groysman
- Olga Churakova
- Irina Dolinina
- Alesya Marokhovskaya

== Release ==
My Undesirable Friends: Part I — Last Air in Moscow was screened for press at the New York Film Festival ahead of its official world premiere on September 25, 2024, where journalists at exiled Russian news network TV Rain were in attendance.

My Undesirable Friends: Part I — Last Air in Moscow premiered in the Main Slate section, at the 62nd edition of New York Film Festival on October 13, 2024.

The film had its international premiere on 20 February 2025, as part of the 75th Berlin International Film Festival, in Berlinale Special. It was also part of Horizons section of the 59th Karlovy Vary International Film Festival, where it was screened from 4 July to 10 July 2025.

My Undesirable Friends: Part I — Last Air in Moscow returned to New York City with an extended run (in two parts) at Film Forum in August and September 2025. In January 2026, Mubi acquired distribution rights to the film.

The film alongside My Undesirable Friends: Part II – Exile will be screened at the 35th Philadelphia Film Festival in October 2026.

== Reception ==
On the review aggregator website Rotten Tomatoes, 100% of 37 critics' reviews are positive.

Lauren Wissot reviewing for IndieWire graded the film an A−, titling it as "A Scary and Riveting Portrait of Russia’s Last Independent News Channel". Wissot opined that albeit spending over five hours mostly in the company of strangers in their apartments might initially seem like a rather tedious experience but, Loktev manages to justify this duration, as her "undesirable friends" gradually become familiar to us as well.

Keith Uhlich, reviewing for Slant Magazine, gave the film a score of 3 out of 4, opining, "In a strange and very sad way, the Ukraine invasion gives Julia Loktev’s movie its sense of purpose."

=== Accolades ===
Tim Grierson, a critic with Screen International, placed the film at number 1 as Best Documentary of the year 2024. Both Manohla Dargis and Alissa Wilkenson of The New York Times included it on their lists of the 10 best movies of 2025.

| Award | Date of ceremony | Category | Recipient(s) | Result | Ref. |
|---|---|---|---|---|---|
| Indie Film Site Network | November 12, 2025 | Indie Film Site Network Advocate Award | My Undesirable Friends: Part I — Last Air in Moscow | Won | |
| Gotham Independent Film Awards | December 1, 2025 | Best Documentary Feature | Julia Loktev, Michael Taylor | Won | |
| International Documentary Association | December 6, 2025 | Best Editing | Julia Loktev | Nominated | |
| Critics' Choice Documentary Awards | November 9, 2025 | Best Political Documentary | My Undesirable Friends: Part I — Last Air in Moscow | Nominated | |
| New York Film Critics Circle | January 6, 2026 | Best Non-Fiction Film | My Undesirable Friends: Part I — Last Air in Moscow | Won | |
| Los Angeles Film Critics Association | January 10, 2026 | Best Documentary Film | My Undesirable Friends: Part I — Last Air in Moscow | Won | |
| Film Independent Spirit Awards | February 15, 2026 | Best Documentary Feature | My Undesirable Friends: Part I — Last Air in Moscow | Nominated | |

== See also ==
- List of films with a 100% rating on Rotten Tomatoes
- List of longest films
