= Ivan Safronov (journalist) =

Russian journalist

- Born: 18 May 1990 (age 36); Moscow, USSR
- Education: Higher School of Economics
- Occupation: Journalist

Ivan Ivanovich Safronov (Russian: Иван Иванович Сафронов; born 18 May 1990) is a Russian journalist. He was arrested in July 2020 on charges of treason related to allegedly disclosing state secrets. A Kremlin spokesman claimed following the arrest that "As far as we know this is not linked to his prior journalistic activity in any way." Kommersant called the charges of treason "absurd".

== Journalism and Roscosmos ==
Ivan Safronov worked on military reporting for Kommersant until 2019. He later became a journalist at the daily newspaper Vedomosti.

In May 2020, Safronov started work at the Russian space agency Roscosmos as a public relations advisor to Dmitry Rogozin, the head of Roscosmos.

== Legal case ==
Safronov was arrested in June 2020 and leading journalist Taisia Bekbulatova was arrested on the same day in relation to the case.

In June 2019, Kommersant was accused in Russian courts with disclosing state secrets; according to BBC News, the case was based on an article co-authored by Safronov about Russian sales of fighter jets to Egypt. Safronov was later fired from Kommersant over a separate article. The entire politics desk of Kommersant resigned in protest.

Safronov was arrested in July 2020 on charges of treason. Kommersant called the treason charges "absurd". The charges were of collecting secret information about Russian armed forces and giving the information to Czech spies. Safronov stated that the charges were false and that he was being prosecuted for his journalism.

In a court hearing in late August/early September 2022, Safronov refused a plea bargain of a 12-year sentence in return for a guilty plea.

On 5 September 2022 Safranov was sentenced to 22 years in prison in relation to the treason charges. Safronov's legal team said that it would appeal the verdict.

In February 2023, Ivan Safronov was dismissed from the position of adviser to the Director General of Roscosmos in accordance with the court verdict, under paragraph 4 of part one of Article 83 of the Labor Code of the Russian Federation.

=== Legal validity ===
Safronov's legal team stated that the trial included legal violations and that prosecution witnesses had stated that Safronov had not violated the law.

Among Safronov's lawyers, a criminal investigation for allegedly revealing secret information was opened against Ivan Pavlov as a suspect, and Pavlov left Russia in 2021; and Dmitry Talantov was arrested for allegedly "discrediting" Russian armed forces.

=== Analysis ===
Proekt published the details of the charges and said that the "state secrets" allegedly published by Safronov were mostly available on the Internet.

=== Support for Safronov ===
Early on 5 September, prior to the court hearing, Meduza, TV Rain, Novaya Gazeta Europe, and The Moscow Times called for Safronov to be released, arguing that he was being persecuted for his journalism, not treason. In 2026, Amnesty International designated Safronov as a prisoner of conscience.

=== Opposition to Safronov ===
Russian officials stated that the legal case was unrelated to Safronov's journalism.

== Family ==
Safronov's father, also named Ivan Safronov, (16 January 1956 – 2 March 2007) was a Russian journalist and columnist who covered military affairs for the daily newspaper Kommersant. He died after falling from the fifth floor of his Moscow apartment building. There were speculations that Safronov senior might have been killed for his critical reporting: the Taganka District prosecutor's office in Moscow initiated a criminal investigation into Safronov's death, and in September 2007, officially ruled his death a suicide. Safronov is engaged to fellow journalist Ksenia Mironova.

== See also ==
- Law of Russia
