= Ivan Safronov =

Russian journalist (1956–2007)

Ivan Ivanovich Safronov (Russian: Иван Иванович Сафронов) (16 January 1956 – 2 March 2007) was a Russian journalist and columnist who covered military affairs for the daily newspaper Kommersant. He died after falling from the fifth floor of his Moscow apartment building. His apartment was on the third floor. There are speculations that he may have been killed for his critical reporting: the Taganka District prosecutor's office in Moscow initiated a criminal investigation into Safronov's death, and in September 2007, officially ruled his death a suicide.

His son Ivan Safronov, who has also worked as a high-profile journalist, was arrested in July 2020 on charges of treason. A Kremlin spokesman stated following the arrest that "As far as we know this is not linked to his prior journalistic activity in any way." Kommersant called the charges of treason "absurd".

== Life ==
Safronov was born in 1956 in Moscow. In 1979, he graduated with a major in computer engineering from the Engineering Faculty at the Dzerzhinsky Military Academy. He served as a military engineer in the 15th Command near Ussuriysk in the Russian Far East. In 1983, Safronov was transferred to the Titov Space Center (Главный испытательный центр испытаний и управления космическими средствами) in Krasnoznamensk, a closed town in Moscow Oblast.

In January 1993 he began working in the press-service at the Russian Space Troops. On 2 October 1997, Safronov retired from active duty and was transferred to the army reserve as a lieutenant colonel. In December 1997, he became a military columnist at the newspaper Kommersant in Moscow. In December 2002, Safronov was made a colonel in the army reserve.

== Last reporting ==
Safronov wrote about changes in the defense leadership and problems in military training, as well as about defense technology and military testing failures that often went unacknowledged and unreported by the army.

In December 2006, Safronov wrote about the third consecutive launch failure of the Bulava intercontinental ballistic missile. The military did not acknowledge the failure. There were further allegations that Safronov disclosed classified information in his articles. FSB agents questioned him in 2006 over a story about the Samara-based TsSKB-Progress, the manufacturer of the Soyuz rocket. The agents wanted to know where the columnist had unearthed some sensitive data. Once Safronov showed them the website where he got his facts, the FSB dropped its case.

Safronov returned to Moscow in late February 2007 from a reporting trip to Abu Dhabi, United Arab Emirates, where he had covered the annual IDEX 2007 arms exhibition's gathering of defense manufacturers. He had stated that he would check information that he had received on possible new deliveries of Russian weapons to the Middle East while at the arms exhibition in the United Arab Emirates. Safronov was interested in a possible sale of Su-30 fighter jets to Syria and S-300V missiles to Iran. He had information that those deals would be concluded through a third party, in order for Moscow to avoid accusations in the West of selling weapons to pariah states.

Prior to his return, Safronov called the editorial office at Kommersant from Abu Dhabi to say that he had found confirmation of the claims. On 27 February he attended a press conference held by the head of the Federal Service of Military and Technical Cooperation Mikhail Dmitriev at ITAR-TASS. There he told colleagues that he had found information that more contracts had been signed between Russia and Syria for the sale of MiG-29 jets and Pantsir-S1 and Iskander-E missiles. He added that he would not write about those deals, however, because he had been warned that doing so would cause an international scandal and the FSB would make charges against him of revealing state secrets stick. He did not say who had warned him.

== Death ==
He died after falling from the fifth floor of the Moscow building where he lived. Prosecutors say suicide is the likeliest explanation for his death. Although Safronov's colleagues and neighbors doubted that he would have taken his own life, arguing that he had been in a good frame of mind, many witnesses stated that he had been in an unusually depressed state of mind several days before the incident. Recently discovered major health problems (Peptic Ulcer) might be also a contributing factor.

Safronov fell out of the staircase window between the fourth and the fifth floors of his apartment building at 9 Nizhny Novgorod Street (Нижегородская улица) around 4 p.m. on 2 March. Two university students living in a nearby building saw Safronov on the ground with the window open above, and called emergency workers. Safronov was alive immediately after the fall, but at least a half hour passed before help arrived.

Safronov was lying on his stomach, and it seemed to the students that he had tried to get up on his feet. Noticing the open window on the stairway between the fourth and fifth floors and the fact that Safronov's shoes had come off and his jacket and sweater were pulled up to his armpits, the students called for an ambulance. Their call was rejected. "We cannot collect all the drunks in Moscow on Friday night," the first responders told psychology student Lena, who had witnessed the fall. She was told to call back if he was still there half an hour an hour later, Kommersant reported on 6 March 2007.

During that time Safronov stopped moving altogether. The students told Kommersant that they did not see anyone near Safronov, nor anyone in the windows of the stairway or leaving through the front door. At least three of his neighbors on the fourth and fifth floors were home at the time. They did not hear any suspicious noises on the stairway.

Safronov had taken sick leave on Friday and gone to a clinic in the Arbat district. He left the clinic at 2 PM and returned home. He had bought oranges which were found scattered on the stairway along with his cap between the fourth and fifth floors. Since Safronov was tall and solidly built, it would not have been easy to throw him from the small window, which was usually left open for smokers who gathered around it. However, footprints were found on the windowsill and ledge outside the window. The snow on top of the canopy over the entrance was disturbed where he fell onto it before rolling off and onto the ground below. An autopsy revealed multiple fractures and injuries to internal organs consistent with a fall from a great height. No drugs or alcohol were found in Safronov's blood.

"The suicide theory has become dominant in the investigation, but all those who knew Ivan Safronov categorically reject it," Kommersant said in an article on 5 March .

Ivan Safronov was buried on 7 March 2007 at the Khovanskoye Cemetery, Moscow.

=== Public reaction ===
General Vladimir Mikhaylov, Commander of the Russian Air Force, expressed in a statement:

"[Safronov] was one of those people who is remembered for his bright creative talent. It was always interesting to talk with him, not only as a professional, but also as an interesting person."

=== Son ===
His son, also named Ivan, worked on military reporting for Kommersant until 2019, when he joined a separate daily newspaper, Vedomosti. In June 2019, the Russian courts heard allegations that Kommersant had disclosed state secrets. According to the BBC, "The information reportedly had to do" with an article that included Safronov on the byline. Safronov was later fired over a separate article, prompting the entire politics desk of Vedomosti to resign in protest.

Safronov was arrested in July 2020 on charges of treason. At the time of his arrest, he was working as an advisor to the head of the Roscosmos space agency. Kommersant has called the treason charges "absurd". On 5 September 2022 Safranov was sentenced to 22 years in prison in relation to the treason charges.

== See also ==
- Reporters Without Borders
- International Federation of Journalists
