= My Undesirable Friends: Part II – Exile =

2026 American documentary film

- Theatrical release poster
- Directed by: Julia Loktev
- Produced by: Julia Loktev
- Cinematography: Julia Loktev
- Edited by: Julia Loktev; Michael Taylor
- Production company: Marminchilla
- Distributed by: Mubi
- Release dates: September 4, 2026 (Venice); October 9, 2026 (United States)
- Running time: 355 minutes
- Country: United States
- Languages: Russian; English
- Box office: $25,699

My Undesirable Friends: Part II – Exile is a 2026 American documentary film produced and directed by Julia Loktev. A sequel to the 2024 film My Undesirable Friends: Part I — Last Air in Moscow, it follows several independent Russian journalists as they flee the country into exile, following Vladimir Putin government's repression of free speech.

The film had its world premiere out of competition at the 83rd Venice International Film Festival on September 4, 2026. It was theatrically released in the United States by Mubi on October 9.

== Premise ==
Several journalists Anna Nemzer, Ksenia Mironova, Sonya Groysman, Olga Churakova, Irina Dolinina and Alesya Marokhovskaya flee Russia and travel to various countries where they struggle with shame and accountability for the Russo-Ukrainian war they all oppose.

== Production ==
Production commenced simultaneously with Part I, taking place on an iPhone. Meryl Streep and Laura Poitras serve as executive producers.

== Release ==
In January 2026, Mubi acquired distribution rights to the film. It had its world premiere Out of Competition at the 83rd Venice International Film Festival on September 4, 2026. It had its North American premiere at the 53rd Telluride Film Festival on September 6. It was also selected for the Main Slate of the 2026 New York Film Festival. It was theatrically released in the U.S. on October 9, 2026.

== Reception ==
On the review aggregator website Rotten Tomatoes, 100% of 11 critics' reviews are positive, with an average rating of 7.8/10. On Metacritic, the film has a weighted average score of 91 out of 100, based on 8 critics, indicating "universal acclaim".

=== Accolades ===
Award	Date of ceremony	Category	Recipient(s)	Result	Ref.
Cinema Eye Honors	January 11, 2027	Outstanding Achievement in Nonfiction Feature Filmmaking	Julia Loktev, Michael Taylor, Anna Nemzer, Ksenia Mironova, Elena Kostyuchenko, and Valeria Ratnikova	Pending	
Cinema Eye Honors	January 11, 2027	Outstanding Achievement in Production	Julia Loktev	Pending	
