= Light Sleeper =

1992 film by Paul Schrader

- Theatrical release poster
- Directed by: Paul Schrader
- Written by: Paul Schrader
- Produced by: Linda Reisman
- Starring: Willem Dafoe; Susan Sarandon; Dana Delany; David Clennon; Mary Beth Hurt
- Cinematography: Edward Lachman
- Edited by: Kristina Boden
- Music by: Michael Been
- Production company: Seven Arts
- Distributed by: Fine Line Features
- Release date: August 21, 1992
- Running time: 103 minutes
- Country: United States
- Language: English
- Budget: $5 million
- Box office: $1,055,987

Light Sleeper is a 1992 American neo-noir crime drama film written and directed by Paul Schrader and starring Willem Dafoe, Susan Sarandon, and Dana Delany. Set in New York City during a sanitation strike, the story follows a high-class drug dealer battling a midlife crisis (Dafoe) before becoming embroiled in tragic events following a chance encounter with a former girlfriend (Delany).

While under-performing at the box office, the film was regarded favorably by critics.

== Plot ==
John LeTour, a 40-year-old New Yorker, is one of two delivery men for Ann, who supplies an exclusive clientele in the banking and financing sector with drugs. While Ann contemplates switching to the cosmetics business, LeTour, who suffers from insomnia, has lost his perspective in life.

One night LeTour meets his ex-wife Marianne, with whom he once shared an intense but destructive relationship due to drug abuse. Although they stopped taking drugs, Marianne refuses his offer for a new start. After spending one night together, she tells him that this was her way of saying goodbye. Unbeknown to Marianne, her mother died at the hospital while she was with LeTour. The next time she meets LeTour, she attacks him, demanding that he get out of her life once and for all.

Meanwhile, the police start observing LeTour because one of his clients, Tis, is connected to the drug-induced death of a young woman. On his next delivery, LeTour witnesses a heavily drugged Marianne in Tis' apartment. Only minutes after his departure, she falls several stories to her death. LeTour gives the police a lead to Marianne's last whereabouts. At the wake, Marianne's sister Randi tells him not to feel guilty for what happened.

When Tis orders a new supply and insists that LeTour deliver it, he senses that Tis wants to dispose of him. Ann accompanies him to Tis's hotel but, when it becomes clear that a confrontation with Tis cannot be avoided, LeTour tells her to wait for him downstairs. Ann leaves, but raises an alarm in the outer hallway, distracting Tis's henchmen and allowing John to take the initiative. LeTour kills Tis and both of his henchmen in the subsequent shootout, and is superficially wounded. He lies down on the hotel bed, showing no anger or pain, only a profound weariness, as police sirens can be heard in the distance.

Ann visits LeTour in jail, where he expresses his hopes for a better future. The film hints at the possibility that Ann will wait for him.

== Cast ==
- Willem Dafoe as John LeTour
- Susan Sarandon as Ann
- Dana Delany as Marianne Jost
- David Clennon as Robert
- Mary Beth Hurt as Teresa Aranow
- Victor Garber as Tis Brüg
- Jane Adams as Randi Jost
- Robert Cicchini as Bill Guidone
- Sam Rockwell as Jealous
- David Spade as Theological Cokehead

== Background ==
Schrader has described the film as a "man and his room" story like American Gigolo and his most famous screenplay which became the basis for Martin Scorsese's Taxi Driver. In this film his character is dealing with anxiety over his life and the external forces that threaten it. Light Sleeper also shares with American Gigolo an ending reminiscent of Robert Bresson's Pickpocket, in which the imprisoned hero is shown contemplating a new and hopefully better existence.

The movie was still in the process of fundraising when production began, so Schrader financed the first three weeks of pre-production using his own money. Light Sleeper was the first artistic collaboration of Willem Dafoe and Paul Schrader, who met during filming of Martin Scorsese's The Last Temptation of Christ. Dafoe and Schrader later collaborated in Affliction (1997), Auto Focus (2002), The Walker (2007), Adam Resurrected (2008), Dog Eat Dog (2016) and The Card Counter (2021).

Schrader had originally intended to use songs from Bob Dylan's album Empire Burlesque, but Schrader and Dylan could not agree on which songs to use and Schrader decided to use songs by Michael Been instead.

Light Sleeper premiered at the Berlin International Film Festival in February 1992 and was released in the US on August 21 that same year, earning $1 million at the box office. It gained mostly positive reviews and received various nominations, including the Independent Spirit Award. Willem Dafoe was awarded the Sant Jordi Award as best actor. In a telegram, German filmmaker Wim Wenders congratulated Schrader, stating that his direction was in a league with that of Japanese director Yasujirō Ozu, who both Wenders and Schrader admire. In a 2005 interview, Schrader called Light Sleeper his most personal film.

== Reception ==
Light Sleeper received positive reviews from critics. It holds an 87% approval rating on Rotten Tomatoes based on 45 reviews, with a rating average of 7.50/10. The site's critical consensus reads, "Light Sleeper requires patience, but delivers commensurate rewards -- and boasts an absorbing performance from Willem Dafoe." Metacritic assigned the film a weighted average score of 70 out of 100, based on 22 critics, indicating "generally favorable" reviews.

Film critic Roger Ebert wrote, "Schrader knows this world of insomnia, craving and addiction. And he knows all about people living in a cocoon of themselves. […] In film after film, for year after year, Paul Schrader has been telling this story in one way or another, but never with more humanity than this time”.

Owen Gleiberman of Entertainment Weekly wrote Light Sleeper is "[…] a small but absorbing mood piece […] even when the film doesn't gel, one is held by Willem Dafoe's grimly compelling performance”.

Writing for Time Out Film Guide, Geoff Andrew said the film is a "stylish film…But the story meanders, and it echoes Taxi Driver and American Gigolo so closely that Schrader is working less than fresh variations on over-familiar themes”.
