= Julia Loktev =

American film director

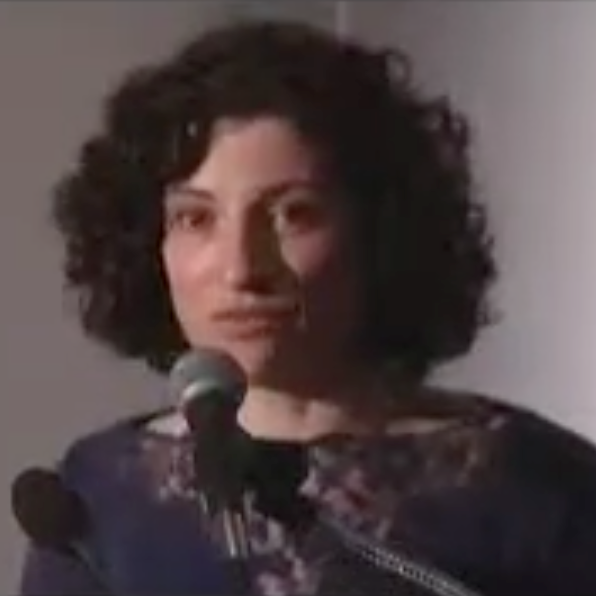
- At the Brooklyn Museum in 2007
- Born: December 12, 1969 (age 56); Leningrad, Soviet Union
- Occupation: Director
- Years active: 1998–present

Julia Loktev (born December 12, 1969) is a Russian–American film director, screenwriter, and video artist.

== Early life ==
Julia Loktev was born in Leningrad, Soviet Union (now St. Petersburg, Russia) in a Jewish family. She immigrated to the United States as a child and lived in Colorado until leaving for college. She moved to Montreal to study English and film at McGill University. She received an M.F.A. from the Graduate Film Program at New York University.

== Career ==
In 1998 Loktev directed the documentary Moment of Impact, inspired by her father who was severely injured in an automobile accident. The documentary won the Documentary Directing Award at Sundance Film Festival and the Grand Prize at Cinéma du Réel.

Loktev was resident at Eyebeam in 2005. In 2006, she directed Day Night Day Night, which premiered in the Directors' Fortnight section of the 59th Cannes Film Festival, being recognized with the Prix Regard Jeune. The film was critically acclaimed, winning several film festival competitions and an Independent Spirit Award.

Loktev received a Guggenheim Fellowship in 2009.

In 2011, Loktev adapted the short story Expensive Trips Nowhere into the film The Loneliest Planet. The film competed in several international film festivals, winning the Grand Jury Prize at the AFI Fest in Los Angeles and being nominated at the Film Independent Spirit Awards. In 2015, Richard Brody called her one of the best woman movie directors.

In 2024 Loktev directed the documentary film My Undesirable Friends: Part I — Last Air in Moscow, being critically acclaimend, winning several accolades, including the Gotham Independent Film Award for Best Documentary.

== Filmography ==
Year	Title	Notes
1998	Moment of Impact	Documentary
2006	Day Night Day Night	
2011	The Loneliest Planet	
2024	My Undesirable Friends: Part I — Last Air in Moscow	Documentary
2026	My Undesirable Friends: Part II – Exile	Documentary

== Art installation ==
- Rough House, Brooklyn Museum of Art's "Global Feminisms" show (2007)

== Awards and nominations ==
Award / Festival	Year	Category	Work	Result	Ref.
AFI Festival	2011	Grand Jury Prize	The Loneliest Planet	Won	
Cannes Film Festival	2005	C.I.C.A.E. Award	Day Night Day Night	Nominated	
Cannes Film Festival	2005	SACD Prize	Day Night Day Night	Nominated	
Cannes Film Festival	2005	Prix Regard Jeune	Day Night Day Night	Won	
Chicago International Film Festival	1998	Best Documentary	Moment of Impact	Nominated	
Chicago International Film Festival	2006	Fipresci Prize	Day Night Day Night	Won	
Cinéma du Réel	1998	Cinéma du Réel Award	Moment of Impact	Won	
Festival du nouveau cinéma	2006	Feature Film Award	Day Night Day Night	Won	
Film Independent Spirit Awards	1999	Truer Than Fiction Award	Moment of Impact	Nominated	
Film Independent Spirit Awards	2007	Best First Feature	Day Night Day Night	Nominated	
Film Independent Spirit Awards	2007	Someone to Watch Award	Day Night Day Night	Won	
Film Independent Spirit Awards	2013	Best Director	The Loneliest Planet	Nominated	
Film Independent Spirit Awards	2026	Best Documentary Feature	My Undesirable Friends: Part I — Last Air in Moscow	Nominated	
Gotham Independent Film Awards	2006	Best Breakthrough Director	Day Night Day Night	Nominated	
Gotham Independent Film Awards	2011	Best Feature	The Loneliest Planet	Nominated	
Gotham Independent Film Awards	2025	Best Documentary	My Undesirable Friends: Part I — Last Air in Moscow	Won	
Hamburg Film Festival	2006	Critics Award	Day Night Day Night	Nominated	
Istanbul Film Festival	2006	Best Film	The Loneliest Planet	Won	
Las Palmas de Gran Canaria International Film Festival	2011	Lady Harimaguada de Oro	The Loneliest Planet	Won	
Locarno Film Festival	2006	Golden Leopard Award	The Loneliest Planet	Nominated	
San Francisco International Film Festival	1999	Certificate of Merit	Moment of Impact	Won	
Sundance Film Festival	1999	Directing Award — Documentary	Moment of Impact	Won	
