= Day Night Day Night =

- Film poster
- Directed by: Julia Loktev
- Written by: Julia Loktev
- Produced by: Melanie Judd; Jessica Levin
- Starring: Luisa Williams; Josh Phillip Weinstein; Gareth Saxe; Nyambi Nyambi
- Cinematography: Benoît Debie
- Edited by: Julia Loktev; Michael Taylor
- Distributed by: IFC Films
- Release dates: May 25, 2006 (Cannes); May 9, 2007 (United States)
- Running time: 94 minutes
- Countries: United States; Germany; France
- Language: English
- Box office: $35,933

Day Night Day Night is a 2006 drama film written and directed by Julia Loktev. It documents 48 hours in the life of an anonymous 19-year-old as she prepares to become a suicide bomber in Times Square. It premiered on May 25, 2006, in the Directors' Fortnight section of the 58th Annual Cannes Film Festival.

== Plot ==
The protagonist (Williams), a 19-year-old girl who agrees to be the suicide bomber for a plan, is traveling by bus to New Jersey, pacing herself through whispers. She receives a phone call telling her where to meet a driver who takes her to eat and to a hotel where she settles in.

Hours later, a phone call tells her to wait in the bathroom, cover her eyes and cuff herself while the organizers arrive. When they do so, they talk about how and when she will set off the bomb, they tell her she must execute the plan immediately if she's ever caught or noticed even if there is no one around. She asks why she would do it especially if there is no one around, but they don't answer.

The organizers ask her if she wants to make a video for her parents but she says they're dead. They prepare her for a recording, changing her into different clothes and backgrounds, including holding an AK-47 and bandoliers, the video itself is not shown and nor the goal or motive of the bombing is ever known. She is later seen pacing herself again, pondering if her motives for the plan are pure or real.

The next morning, the organizers prepare her, settling on her outfit and get her to memorize a fake ID card information. The commander assures her to not worry, that the pain of the explosion will be like a mosquito bite to her and it will be over quick.

She is taken to an underground location where she is given the backpack with the bomb inside and assure that the protagonist is comfortable carrying it around, she is also told how to set it off by using a portable mp3 player's remote. Later, she is picked up by the same driver who leaves her at a bus stop that takes her to New York City. She is meant to set the bomb off near Times Square and asks pedestrians for directions towards it, she also buys different snacks while she walks around the city.

The protagonist approaches the plan's location, a busy crosswalk, she's meant to set off the bomb when the light turns green and people cross, she waits for the light observing all the people and things around her, but panics and runs off to a nearby restaurant's bathroom to clean herself as she presumably urinates herself. She walks out and tries to carry on the plan again, clearly tense, she does attempt to set off the bomb with the music player's remote but it doesn't work, she stays frozen in the middle of the street trying to get it to work but it doesn't. She runs to the same bathroom again to check the wiring and the backpack's content, and tries it one more time, but the bomb still does not go off.

Not knowing what to do and having no way to contact the organizers, she walks around the city and tries to phone the hotel she was staying at and her personal cell phone but both are unreachable, she runs out of coins and asks nearby people for more and makes another phone call to what could be her parents, who ask her how her trip to Chicago is going, but she stays silent. Stressed out, she roams around the city and bumps the backpack around in frustration until it falls on the ground, it's picked up by young guy who asks her why the bag is so heavy to which she responds with "it's a bomb" jokingly, he tries to flirt with her until she walks away from him, frantic.

The last scene is the protagonist seated on a sidewalk without the backpack in sight while it's late at night. Desolated, looking out, she murmurs and pleads for a sign.

== Cast ==
- Luisa Williams as She
- Josh P. Weinstein as Commander
- Gareth Saxe as Organizer
- Nyambi Nyambi as Organizer
- Teo Yoo as Driver
- Frank Dattolo as Bombmaker
- Annemarie Lawless as Bombmaker's Assistant

== Release ==
=== Critical reception ===
On review aggregation website Rotten Tomatoes, the film holds an approval rating of 69% based on 45 reviews, and an average rating of 6.6/10. On Metacritic, the film has a weighted average score of 61 out of 100, based on 14 critics, indicating "generally favorable" reviews.

Variety's Justing Chang wrote "a dramatically limited but strangely powerful portrait of a young would-be terrorist who sets out to blow herself up in Times Square," adding, "By turns frustrating and impressive in its austerity, Julia Loktev’s experimental first feature is too radically minimalist to find much of an audience beyond the festival circuit, although those willing to stick with it may find it an authentically harrowing if not especially revealing experience."

Slant's Ed Gonzalez described the film as "nothing more, nothing less than another exercise in sadistic immediacy."

Williams received positive reviews for her film debut. Stephen Holden of The New York Times wrote "To study the unsettled emotional weather on the face of Luisa Williams, the intense, dark-eyed star of 'Day Night Day Night,' is to be reminded of Norma Desmond’s famous boast, 'We had faces then.'"

"Determination, rage, uncertainty, bravado, modesty and panic are among the feelings that flicker over her slightly feral features," Holden wrote. "Whatever her ancestry (Ms. Williams is a native New Yorker making her screen debut), she has a face you’ll never forget."

Ty Burr described Williams as "remarkable" in a short piece for Movie Nation.

"Williams emits a sort of radiance...she has an unforgettable face, the way women in certain European art movies do," Wesley Morris wrote for The Boston Globe. "There's nothing conventional about it: Her dark, tired-seeming eyes recede into their sockets, her mouth and nose are almost beak-like, drawn into a sort of permanent frown...in the film's agonizing last 20 minutes, her severe and opaque countenance opens into a universe of transparent emotional distress."

=== Accolades ===
Day Night Day Night won the Regard Jeune award for young filmmakers at the 2006 Cannes Film Festival., the Maverick Award for Best Narrative Feature at the 2006 Woodstock Film Festival., and Feature Film Award at the Montréal Festival of New Cinema 2006.
