= Chalk (film) =

- Directed by: Mike Akel
- Written by: Mike Akel and Chris Mass
- Produced by: Mike Akel; Angie Alvarez; Graham Davidson; Chris Mass
- Starring: Chris Mass; Troy Schremmer; Janelle Schremmer; Shannon Haragan
- Cinematography: Steven Schaefer
- Edited by: Bob Perkins
- Music by: Chris Jagich; Ryan Greene
- Production companies: Gravitas Ventures; Warrior Poets; Someday Soon Productions; Arts Alliance; Hart Sharp Video
- Distributed by: Virgil Films
- Release dates: March 2006 (Cinequest); May 11, 2007 (U.S.)
- Running time: 84 minutes
- Country: United States
- Language: English

Chalk is a 2006 comedy mockumentary about teaching focusing on the lives of three teachers and one assistant principal. It stars Chris Mass as Mr. Stroope and Troy Schremmer as Mr. Lowrey. It is directed by Mike Akel. The movie is based on both Akel's and Mass' real life experiences in the teaching profession. Co-written by Mass and Akel, the film was developed through improvisation all the way through the process, from writing through production and post-production. The final film was edited together from more than 60 hours of footage.

The film premiered in March, 2006 at the "Cinequest Film Festival", presented in April 2006 at the "Boston Independent Film Festival", and released in Los Angeles on May 11, 2007, playing at the Nuart Theatre and in more cities in subsequent weeks. The film begins by stating that 50 percent of teachers quit within their first three years on the job.

The film has received a mostly positive response from critics regarding it as an antithesis to the more common inspirational teacher movies. LA Weekly in its review stated to think of it as "To Sir, With Sarcasm.". Teachers who saw the film noted how the film "nailed" the experiences of a new teacher.

== Plot ==
The film takes the course of an entire school year and describes three teachers and one assistant principal. Mr. Stroope is campaigning for Teacher of the Year but many of his students are a little bit smarter than him. Mr. Lowrey is an introverted first-time history teacher struggling to find passion for his new profession. Coach Webb (played by Janelle Schremmer) is a female gym teacher who is struggling to get her students to take her class seriously, and becomes interested in Mr. Lowrey. Mrs. Reddell (Shannon Haragan) is the first year assistant principal who is regretting leaving teaching.

== Reception ==
Chalk opened with a limited release on May 11, 2007. Reviews have been mostly positive and appreciated the more realistic approach toward the teaching profession as opposed to the more frequent teacher inspiration films that would include the classic Goodbye, Mr. Chips and To Sir, With Love to the more recent Freedom Writers. LA Weekly stated in its review that its "best set pieces are like devastatingly effective pinpricks puncturing the Hollywood hot-air balloon of inspirational teacher/coach melodramas." Teachers who saw the film also said it was a very accurate portrayal of the teaching profession.

Chalk was nominated for the John Cassavetes Award from the Independent Spirit Awards in 2006. It also won Outstanding Performance by Ensemble Cast (Narrative Competition) at the 2006 Los Angeles film festival.

== Background ==
The film is based on both Chris Mass' and Mike Akel's own experiences in public education and even used their former students as extras. The cast is made up entirely of unknowns and was produced on a very low budget. The performers were allowed plenty of room to ad-lib but the film still had to be structured. Over 60 hours of footage was filmed while improvisation was used through the entire process from writing, production, and post-production until the final version was made.

== Credited cast ==
- Kaytea Brock
- Dan Eggleston
- Jeff Guerrero as Mr. G
- Shannon Haragan as Mrs. Reddell
- Jerry Jarmon
- Glen Lewis
- Chris Mass as Mr. Stroope
- Janelle Schremmer as Coach Webb
- Troy Schremmer as Mr. Lowrey
- Jacqueline Seaborn
- Jeffrey Travis as a math teacher
