= Moment of Impact (film) =

- Directed by: Julia Loktev
- Produced by: Melanie Judd
- Starring: Julia Loktev; Leonid Loktev; Larisa Loktev
- Cinematography: Julia Loktev
- Distributed by: Cinemax
- Release date: January 1998 (Sundance Film Festival)
- Running time: 117 minutes
- Country: United States

Moment of Impact is a 1998 American documentary film directed by Julia Loktev.

== Premise ==
The film documents the struggle of Loktev's parents, particularly her mother, following a car accident in 1989 which left Julia's father severely disabled.

== Production ==
The entire film was shot on a Hi8 camera and edited by Loktev.

== Reception ==
For her work, Loktev won the documentary directing award at the 1998 Sundance Film Festival.
