= 14th Independent Spirit Awards =

US film awards ceremony in 1999

- Date: March 20, 1999
- Site: Santa Monica, California, U.S.
- Hosted by: Queen Latifah

Highlights
- Best Film: Gods and Monsters
- Most awards: Gods and Monsters (3)
- Most nominations: Affliction (6)

The 14th Independent Spirit Awards, honoring the best in independent filmmaking for 1998, were announced on March 20, 1999. It was hosted by Queen Latifah.

== Nominees and winners ==
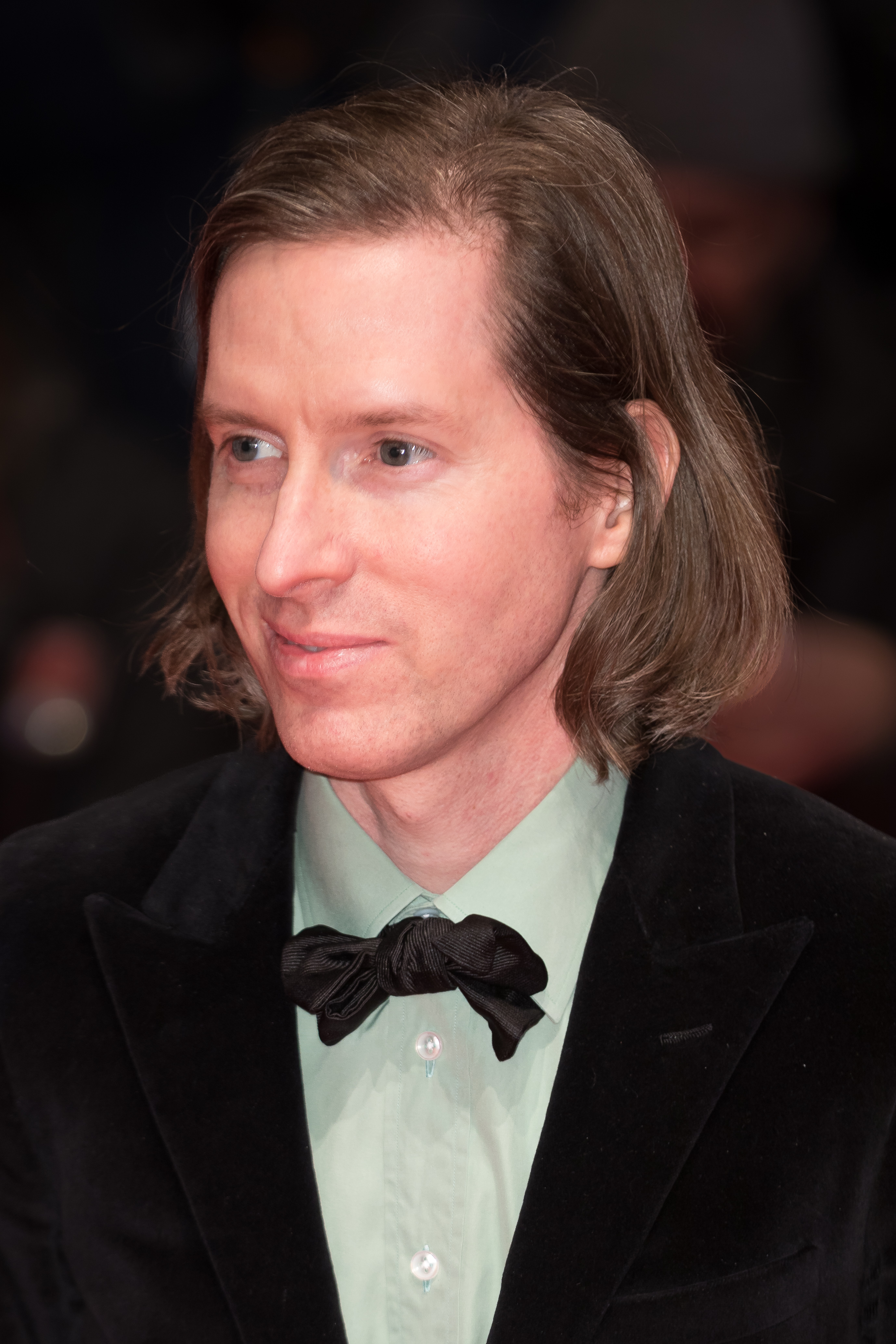
Wes Anderson, Best Director winner

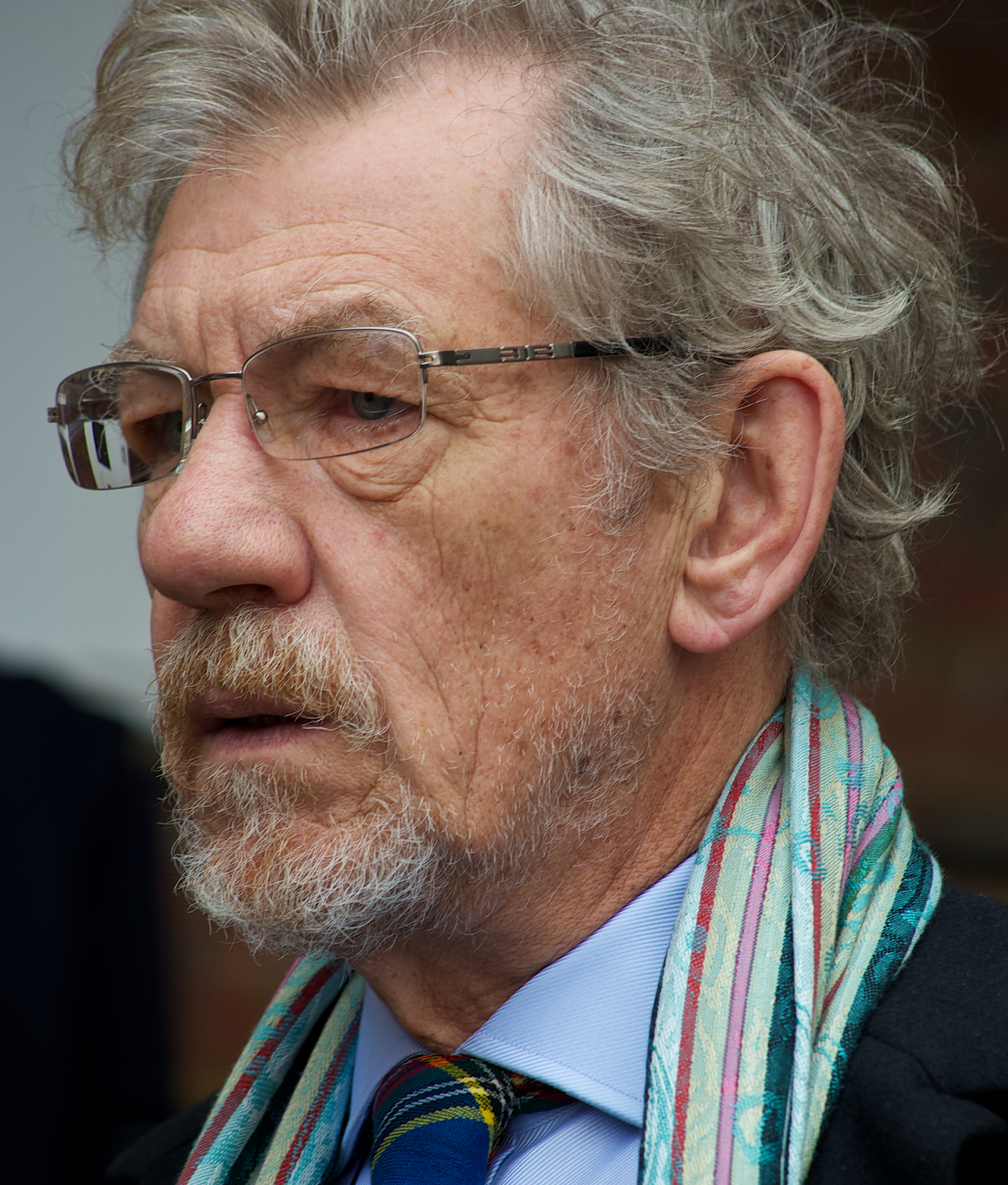
Ian McKellen, Best Male Lead winner

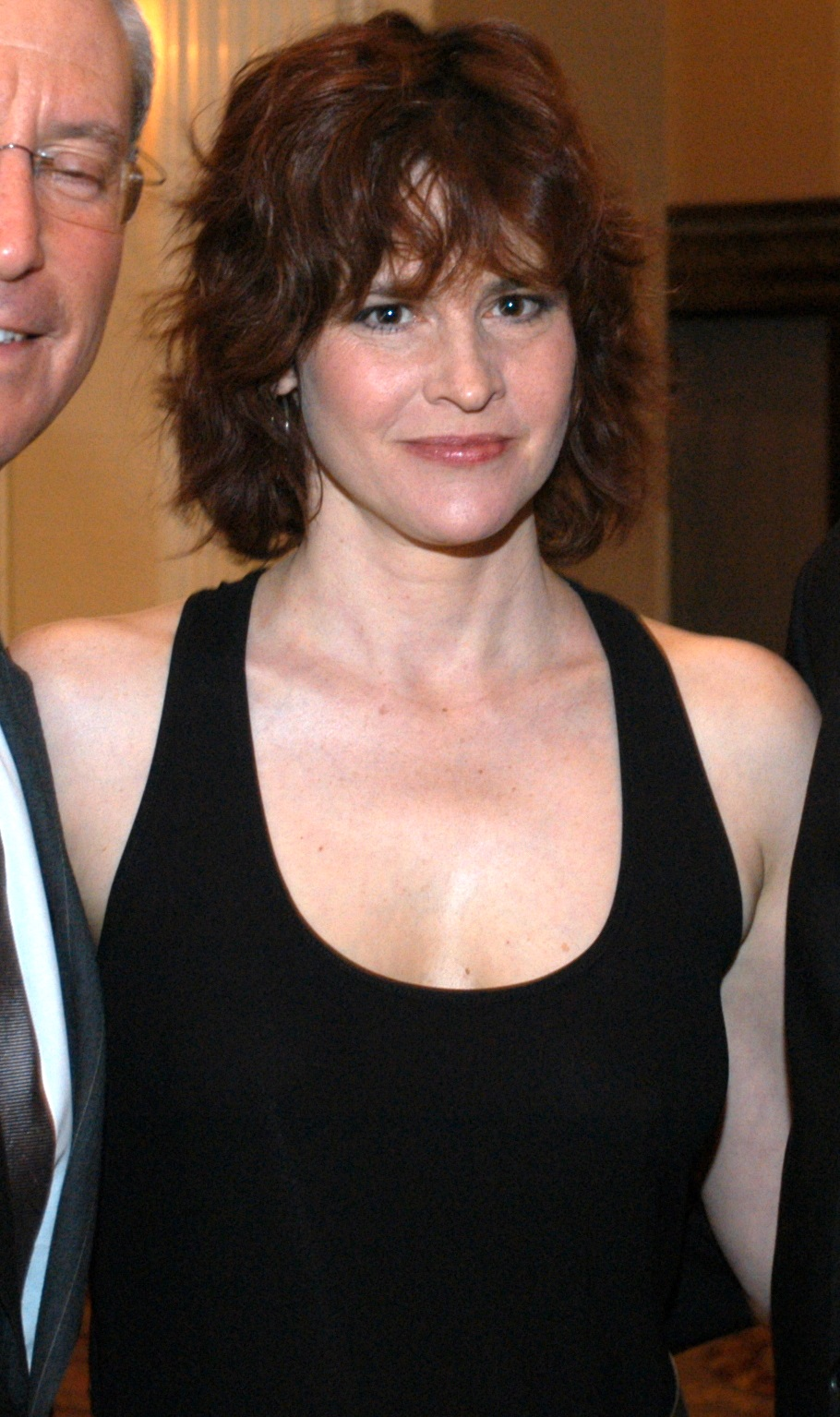
Ally Sheedy, Best Female Lead winner

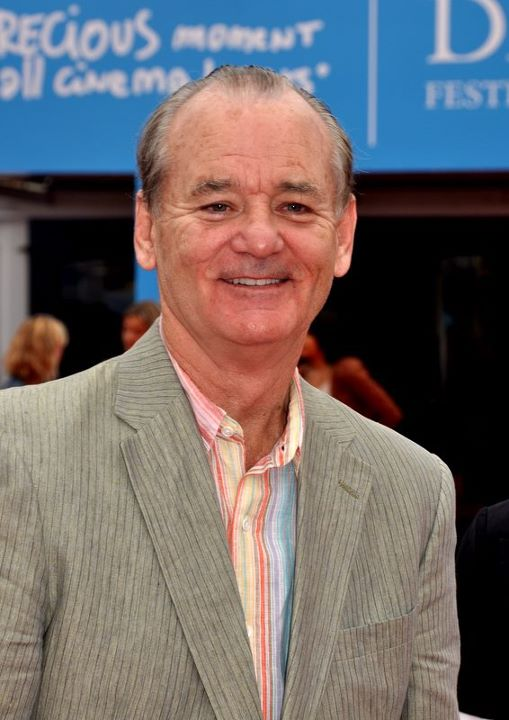
Bill Murray, Best Supporting Male winner

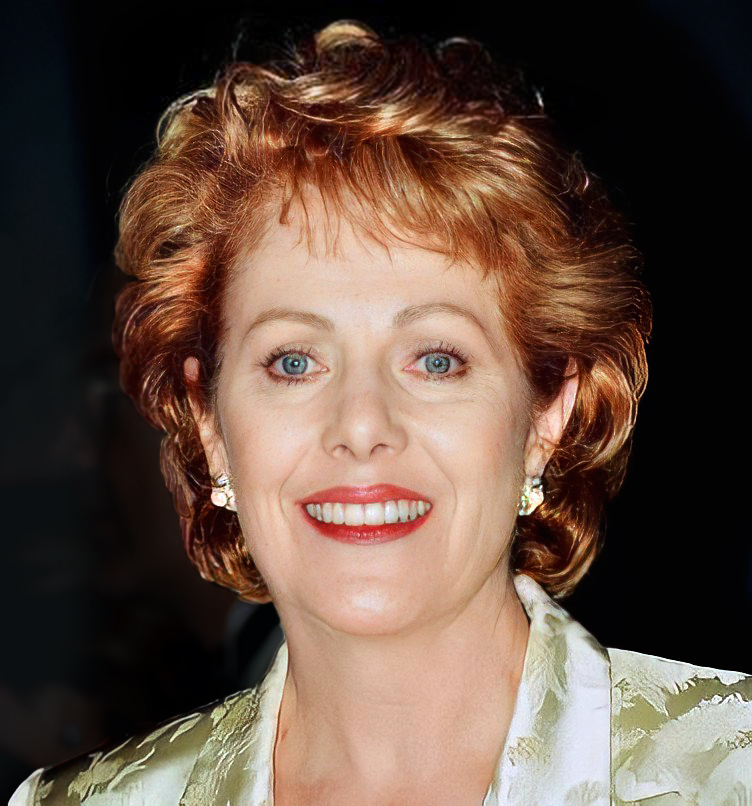
Lynn Redgrave, Best Supporting Female winner

Best Feature	Best Director
Gods and Monsters: Affliction; Claire Dolan; A Soldier's Daughter Never Cries; Velvet Goldmine	Wes Anderson – Rushmore: Todd Haynes – Velvet Goldmine; Lodge Kerrigan – Claire Dolan; Paul Schrader – Affliction; Todd Solondz – Happiness
Best Male Lead	Best Female Lead
Ian McKellen – Gods and Monsters: Dylan Baker – Happiness; Nick Nolte – Affliction; Sean Penn – Hurlyburly; Courtney B. Vance – Blind Faith	Ally Sheedy – High Art: Katrin Cartlidge – Claire Dolan; Christina Ricci – The Opposite of Sex; Robin Tunney – Niagara, Niagara; Alfre Woodard – Down in the Delta
Best Supporting Male	Best Supporting Female
Bill Murray – Rushmore: James Coburn – Affliction; Charles S. Dutton – Blind Faith; Gary Farmer – Smoke Signals; Philip Seymour Hoffman – Happiness	Lynn Redgrave – Gods and Monsters: Stockard Channing – The Baby Dance; Patricia Clarkson – High Art; Lisa Kudrow – The Opposite of Sex; Joely Richardson – Under Heaven
Best Screenplay	Best First Screenplay
The Opposite of Sex – Don Roos: Affliction – Paul Schrader; Blind Faith – Frank Military; Gods and Monsters – Bill Condon; The Spanish Prisoner – David Mamet	π – Darren Aronofsky: High Art – Lisa Cholodenko; Niagara, Niagara – Matthew Weiss; Slums of Beverly Hills – Tamara Jenkins; Smoke Signals – Sherman Alexie
Best First Feature	Best Debut Performance
The Opposite of Sex: Buffalo '66 - Vincent Gallo; High Art - Lisa Cholodenko; π - Darren Aronofsky; Slums of Beverly Hills	Evan Adams – Smoke Signals: Anthony Roth Costanzo – A Soldier's Daughter Never Cries; Andrea Hart – Miss Monday; Sonja Sohn – Slam; Saul Williams – Slam
Best Cinematography	Best Foreign Film
Velvet Goldmine – Maryse Alberti: Affliction – Paul Sarossy; Belly – Malik Hassan Sayeed; High Art – Tami Reiker; π – Matthew Libatique	The Celebration • Denmark: Central Station • Brazil; The Eel • Japan; Fireworks • Japan; The General • Ireland

=== Films that received multiple nominations ===
Nominations	Film
6	Affliction
5	High Art
4	Gods and Monsters
4	The Opposite of Sex
3	Blind Faith
3	Claire Dolan
3	Happiness
3	π
3	Smoke Signals
3	Velvet Goldmine
2	A Soldier's Daughter Never Cries
2	Niagara, Niagara
2	Rushmore
2	Slam
2	Slums of Beverly Hills

==== Films that won multiple awards ====
Awards	Film
3	Gods and Monsters
2	High Art
2	The Opposite of Sex
2	Rushmore

== Special awards ==
=== Truer Than Fiction Award ===
Regret to Inform

- Dear Jesse
- Dying to Tell the Story
- Moment of Impact
- Paulina

=== Producers Award ===
Susan A. Stover – The Sticky Fingers of Time & High Art

- Margot Bridger – Arresting Gena & The Delta
- Gill Holland – Hurricane Streets & Spring Forward
- Andrea Sperling – Nowhere & The Doom Generation

=== Someone to Watch Award ===
David D. Williams – Thirteen

- Tony Barbieri – One
- Lynn Hershman Leeson – Conceiving Ada
- Eric Tretbar – Snow
