= Kristina Boden =

American film and television editor

- Born: United States
- Occupation: Film editor

Kristina Boden is an American film and television editor.

Boden has edited films and television series including Carlito's Way, Body Double, Light Sleeper, Auto Focus, The Disappearance of Eleanor Rigby, Witch Hunt, Fur, Tales from the Darkside, Tokyo Pop, Dear John and Hamlet. She was nominated for "Best Film Editing" award by the Las Vegas Film Critics Society for her work on Black Swan.
