= The Dead Girl =

2006 film by Karen Moncrieff

- Theatrical release poster
- Directed by: Karen Moncrieff
- Written by: Karen Moncrieff
- Produced by: Eric Karten; Gary Lucchesi; Tom Rosenberg; Kevin Turen; Henry Winterstern
- Starring: Toni Collette; Brittany Murphy; Rose Byrne; Marcia Gay Harden; Mary Beth Hurt; Kerry Washington; James Franco; Giovanni Ribisi; Nick Searcy; Mary Steenburgen; Piper Laurie; Josh Brolin
- Cinematography: Michael Grady
- Edited by: Toby Yates
- Music by: Adam Gorgoni
- Production company: Lakeshore Entertainment
- Distributed by: First Look International
- Release date: December 29, 2006
- Running time: 93 minutes
- Country: United States
- Language: English
- Budget: $4 million
- Box office: $905,291

The Dead Girl is a 2006 American drama thriller film written and directed by Karen Moncrieff, starring Brittany Murphy, Toni Collette, Rose Byrne and Marcia Gay Harden. The film was nominated for several 2007 Independent Spirit Awards including Best Feature and Best Director. It is the story of a young woman's death and the people linked to her murder. It also features Mary Beth Hurt, Kerry Washington, James Franco, Giovanni Ribisi, Josh Brolin, Mary Steenburgen and Piper Laurie.

== Plot ==
The story is presented in five parts, each bearing a title:

- The Stranger: Arden lives with her abusive, invalid mother, in the countryside of Acton, California. One day she discovers the naked body of a dead woman on the property. Arden becomes a minor celebrity, drawing the attention of Rudy, who tells her the dead woman is the victim of a serial killer preying on young women in the area. Rudy asks Arden out. Arden gets into a fight with her mother, which compels her to finally leave home. Arden has her date with Rudy. In the morning, Arden calls the police to report a woman (her mother) left alone at home.
- The Sister: Leah is prepping the dead woman in the morgue when she notices a certain birthmark. Leah suspects that the dead woman is her sister, Jenny, who was taken from a nearby park fifteen years ago. She asks the sheriff to match the dental records. She is certain the dead woman is her missing sister, but Leah's parents refuse to believe that Jenny is dead. The sheriff delivers the test result: the dead woman is not Jenny.
- The Wife: Ruth is angry that her husband, Carl, leaves her alone night after night. The next morning, she discovers clothing, wallets, and ID's in ziplock bags inside a storage unit that is supposedly empty. She matches the IDs to names in the newspapers of a serial killer's victims. Carl comes back late at night with scratches on his neck. After another argument, he leaves the house to go to the car outside. He pulls a trash bag out of the trunk and goes to the storage unit. Ruth asks Carl if he knows anything about the missing women, and he says no. Later that night, Ruth enters the unit and pulls everything out. She drives to the police station, but doesn't follow through with her plan to present the evidence she found to the authorities; instead Ruth returns home to burn the evidence.
- The Mother: The dead woman has been identified as Krista Kutcher. Melora, Krista's mother, is notified. Melora goes to Krista's previous house and finds Rosetta, Krista's former roommate. During a tense conversation with Rosetta, Melora learns that her daughter had been a prostitute, that she gave birth to a daughter, and that Melora's late husband had sexually abused her. The following day, Melora takes Krista's daughter home with her.
- The Dead Girl: Krista buys her daughter a stuffed animal for her third birthday. One of her johns, Tarlow, promises to drive her to Norwalk, where her daughter is, but he backs out at the last minute. Krista goes back to her room and finds Rosetta – implied to be her lover – severely beaten. Krista believes the culprit to be a man named Tommy. Krista vandalizes Tommy's car and, when he tries to stop her, she beats him up and leaves on a borrowed motorcycle. Krista calls Rosetta, and tearfully asks if Rosetta cares about her; Rosetta doesn't reply, and Krista hangs up, saddened and hurt. When the motorcycle breaks down on the highway, Krista hitches a ride from Carl. The film ends with Krista smiling, and happily talking about her daughter.

== Cast ==
- Josh Brolin as Tarlow
- Rose Byrne as Leah
- Toni Collette as Arden
- Bruce Davison as Leah's father
- James Franco as Derek
- Marcia Gay Harden as Melora
- Mary Beth Hurt as Ruth
- Piper Laurie as Arden's mother
- Brittany Murphy as Krista
- Giovanni Ribisi as Rudy
- Nick Searcy as Carl
- Mary Steenburgen as Leah's mother
- Kerry Washington as Rosetta

== Reception ==
=== Box office ===
The film was premiered at the AFI Film Festival (7 November 2006), and was given a limited US theatrical release, for two weeks in two theatres, on 29 December 2006. In the United States, The Dead Girl grossed $19,875, with $885,416 in other territories, for a worldwide total of $905,291.

=== Critical response ===
On the review aggregator website Rotten Tomatoes, 75% of 80 critics' reviews are positive, with an average rating of 6.8/10. The website's consensus reads: "This dark thriller boasts a fresh approach, but it can still get bogged down by its heavy subject matter." Metacritic, which uses a weighted average, assigned the film a score of 65 out of 100, based on 21 critics, indicating "generally favorable" reviews.
