= National Board of Review Awards 1998 =

Annual US film awards ceremony

70th National Board of Review Awards

December 8, 1998

Best Picture:
Gods and Monsters

The 70th National Board of Review Awards, honoring the best in filmmaking in 1998, were announced on 8 December 1998 and given on 8 February 1999.

== Top 10 films ==
1. Gods and Monsters
2. Saving Private Ryan
3. Elizabeth
4. Happiness
5. Shakespeare in Love
6. The Butcher Boy
7. Lolita
8. The Thin Red Line
9. A Simple Plan
10. Dancing at Lughnasa

== Top Foreign Films ==
1. Central Station
2. Life Is Beautiful
3. The Thief
4. Beyond Silence
5. Men with Guns

== Winners ==
- Best Picture:
  - Gods and Monsters
- Best Foreign Film:
  - Central Station
- Best Actor:
  - Ian McKellen - Gods and Monsters
- Best Actress:
  - Fernanda Montenegro - Central Station
- Best Supporting Actor:
  - Ed Harris - The Truman Show
- Best Supporting Actress:
  - Christina Ricci - The Opposite of Sex
- Best Acting by an Ensemble:
  - Happiness
- Breakthrough Performance - Male:
  - Billy Crudup - The Hi-Lo Country
- Breakthrough Performance - Female:
  - Angelina Jolie - Playing by Heart
- Best Director:
  - Shekhar Kapur - Elizabeth
- Best Screenplay:
  - Scott B. Smith - A Simple Plan
- Best Documentary:
  - Wild Man Blues
- Best Achievement in Filmmaking:
  - Roberto Benigni - Life Is Beautiful
- Career Achievement Award:
  - Michael Caine
- Billy Wilder Award for Excellence in Directing:
  - Martin Scorsese
- William K. Everson Award for Film History:
  - John Willis
- International Freedom Award:
  - Volker Schlöndorff
- Freedom of Expression:
  - Bernardo Bertolucci
- Special Citation:
  - Warren Beatty, Alan J. Pakula Memorial Award
- Special Recognition for Excellence in Filmmaking:
  - Buffalo '66
  - Dark City
  - Love and Death on Long Island
  - Next Stop Wonderland
  - The Opposite of Sex
  - Passion in the Desert
  - Pi
  - Smoke Signals
  - Waking Ned Devine
  - Your Friends & Neighbors
