= Florida Film Critics Circle Awards 1998 =

Annual US film awards ceremony

3rd FFCC Awards

January 12, 1999

Best Film:
Shakespeare in Love

The 3rd Florida Film Critics Circle Awards took place on January 12, 1999.

== Winners ==
- Best Actor:
  - Ian McKellen - Apt Pupil and Gods and Monsters
- Best Actress:
  - Gwyneth Paltrow - Shakespeare in Love and Sliding Doors
- Best Cinematography:
  - Janusz Kamiński - Saving Private Ryan
- Best Director:
  - Peter Weir - The Truman Show
- Best Film:
  - Shakespeare in Love
- Best Foreign Language Film:
  - Life is Beautiful (La vita è bella) • Italy
- Best Newcomer (tie):
  - Darren Aronofsky - Pi
  - Chris Eyre and Sherman Alexie - Smoke Signals
- Best Screenplay:
  - Marc Norman and Tom Stoppard - Shakespeare in Love
- Best Supporting Actor:
  - Robert Duvall - A Civil Action
- Best Supporting Actress:
  - Christina Ricci - Buffalo '66, The Opposite of Sex, and Pecker
- Special Notice to 1998 animation features:
  - Antz, A Bug's Life, Mulan, and The Prince of Egypt
