= 1998 National Society of Film Critics Awards =

Annual US film awards ceremony

33rd NSFC Awards

January 3, 1999

Best Film:
Out of Sight

The 33rd National Society of Film Critics Awards, given on 3 January 1999, honored the best filmmaking of 1998.

== Winners ==
=== Best Picture ===
1. Out of Sight
2. Affliction
3. Saving Private Ryan

=== Best Director ===
1. Steven Soderbergh – Out of Sight
2. Terrence Malick – The Thin Red Line
2. Steven Spielberg – Saving Private Ryan

=== Best Actor ===
1. Nick Nolte – Affliction
2. Ian McKellen – Gods and Monsters
3. Brendan Gleeson – The General and I Went Down

=== Best Actress ===
1. Ally Sheedy – High Art
2. Cate Blanchett – Elizabeth
3. Fernanda Montenegro – Central Station (Central do Brasil)

=== Best Supporting Actor ===
1. Bill Murray – Rushmore
2. Donald Sutherland – Without Limits
3. Billy Bob Thornton – A Simple Plan

=== Best Supporting Actress ===
1. Judi Dench – Shakespeare in Love
2. Patricia Clarkson – High Art
3. Lisa Kudrow – The Opposite of Sex

=== Best Screenplay ===
1. Scott Frank – Out of Sight
2. Marc Norman and Tom Stoppard – Shakespeare in Love
3. Wes Anderson and Owen Wilson – Rushmore

=== Best Cinematography ===
1. John Toll – The Thin Red Line
2. Janusz Kamiński – Saving Private Ryan
3. Seamus Deasy – The General

=== Best Foreign Language Film ===
1. Taste of Cherry (Ta'm e guilass)
2. Fireworks (Hana-bi)
3. The Celebration (Festen)

=== Best Non-Fiction Film ===
1. The Farm: Angola, USA
2. Public Housing
3. Little Dieter Needs to Fly

=== Experimental Film ===
- Mother and Son (Mat i syn)

=== Special Citation ===
- Walter Murch, Rick Schmidlin, Bob O'Neil and Jonathan Rosenbaum for the re-editing of Orson Welles's Touch of Evil
- Reprinting of an expanded edition of one of the seminal collections of film criticism, Manny Farber's Negative Space
