= Regent Releasing =

Defunct American film distributor

- Industry: Entertainment
- Founded: 1999; 27 years ago
- Founder: Paul Colichman and Stephen P. Jarchow
- Defunct: 2009; 17 years ago
- Fate: Merged with PlanetOut and Here Networks to form Here Media
- Successor: Here Media
- Headquarters: Los Angeles, California, United States
- Key people: Paul Colichman; Stephen P. Jarchow
- Products: Motion pictures
- Website: RegentReleasing.com

Regent Releasing was a U.S. theatrical distribution company based in Los Angeles, California, under the umbrella of Regent Entertainment, which was owned by producers Paul Colichman (formerly of IRS Media) and Stephen P. Jarchow.

Focusing on narrow releases of independent films from around the world and from U.S. filmmakers, Regent's successes include such Academy Award-winning films as Departures, Best Foreign Language film from Japan; Gods and Monsters, starring Ian McKellen; Sordid Lives, starring Olivia Newton-John, Delta Burke, and Leslie Jordan; Franco Zeffirelli's Callas Forever, starring Fanny Ardant, Jeremy Irons and Joan Plowright; and The Hunting of the President, producer Harry Thomason's documentary based on the book about the right-wing conspiracy to destroy Bill Clinton. Regent also distributed film acquisitions from Here Films, their LGBT sister public company.

In 2009, Regent merged with PlanetOut and Here Networks to form Here Media. Regent Releasing was merged into Here Media later in 2009; Here Media then launched Here Films.

Regent Releasing titles (by release year) include:

== 2010 ==
- Dream Boy
- Eichmann
- The Magician
- Manuela y Manuel
- Murder in Fashion
- Patrik, Age 1.5
- Shake Hands with the Devil
- Watercolors

== 2009 ==
- The Blue Tooth Virgin
- Departures (Academy Award Best Foreign Language Film)
- Eleven Minutes
- Little Ashes
- Serbis
- Sex Positive
- The Song of Sparrows
- Taxidermia
- Tokyo Sonata

== 2008 ==
- $9.99
- The Amazing Truth about Queen Raquela
- Antarctica
- Breakfast with Scot
- Ciao
- Cthulhu
- Holding Trevor
- The Hottie and the Nottie
- I Can't Think Straight
- Kabluey
- Kiss the Bride
- No Regret
- Saving Marriage
- Shelter
- Tru Loved
- Vivere
- The World Unseen

== 2007 ==
- Cut Sleeve Boys
- Eleven Men Out
- Fat Girls
- Freshman Orientation
- Looking for Cheyenne (Oublier Cheyenne)
- Nina's Heavenly Delights
- Race You to the Bottom
- ShowBusiness: The Road to Broadway (documentary)
- Stephanie Daley
- Unconscious

== 2006 ==
- April's Shower
- Aurora Borealis
- In Her Line of Fire
- Guys and Balls
- The Mostly Unfabulous Social Life of Ethan Green
- Poster Boy
- Queens
- Shock to the System
- Summer Storm

== 2005 ==
- Beautiful Boxer
- Eternal
- Hellbent
- Margaret Cho: Assassin
- Sex, Politics & Cocktails

== 2004 ==
- The Burial Society
- Callas Forever
- The Hunting of the President (documentary)
- Merci Docteur Rey
- Showboy
- Straight-Jacket

== 2003 ==
- Friends and Family

== 2002 ==
- Yes Nurse! No Nurse!

== 2001 ==
- Sordid Lives
- Speedway Junky

== 2000 ==
- Looking for an Echo
- $pent

== 1999 ==
- Sixth Happiness
