= 1998 Los Angeles Film Critics Association Awards =

Annual US film awards ceremony

24th LAFCA Awards
- Date: December 1998

Highlights
- Best Picture: Saving Private Ryan

The 24th Los Angeles Film Critics Association Awards, honoring the best in film for 1998, were voted on in December 1998. The awards were presented Jan. 20 1999 at the Bel Age Hotel.

== Winners ==
- Best Picture:
  - Saving Private Ryan
  - Runner-up: The Butcher Boy
- Best Director:
  - Steven Spielberg – Saving Private Ryan
  - Runner-up: John Boorman – The General
- Best Actor:
  - Ian McKellen – Gods and Monsters
  - Runner-up: Nick Nolte – Affliction
- Best Actress (tie):
  - Fernanda Montenegro – Central Station (Central do Brasil)
  - Ally Sheedy – High Art
- Best Supporting Actor (tie):
  - Bill Murray – Rushmore and Wild Things
  - Billy Bob Thornton – A Simple Plan
- Best Supporting Actress:
  - Joan Allen – Pleasantville
  - Runner-up: Kathy Bates – Primary Colors
- Best Screenplay:
  - Warren Beatty and Jeremy Pikser – Bulworth
  - Runner-up: Marc Norman and Tom Stoppard – Shakespeare in Love
- Best Cinematography:
  - Janusz Kamiński – Saving Private Ryan
  - Runner-up: Seamus Deasy – The General
- Best Production Design:
  - Jeannine Oppewall – Pleasantville
  - Runner-up: Dennis Gassner – The Truman Show
- Best Music Score:
  - Elliot Goldenthal – The Butcher Boy
  - Runner-up: Carter Burwell – Gods and Monsters
- Best Foreign-Language Film:
  - The Celebration (Festen) • Denmark/Sweden
  - Runner-up: Central Station (Central do Brasil) • Brazil/France
- Best Non-Fiction Film:
  - The Farm: Angola, USA
  - Runner-up: Public Housing
- Best Animation:
  - A Bug's Life (feature)
  - T.R.A.N.S.I.T. (short)
- The Douglas Edwards Experimental/Independent Film/Video Award:
  - Elisabeth Subrin – Shulie
- New Generation Award:
  - Wes Anderson – Rushmore
- Career Achievement Award:
  - Julius J. Epstein
  - Abraham Polonsky
- Special Citation:
  - Rick Schmidlin, Walter Murch, Jonathan Rosenbaum and Bob O'Neil for the restoration of Orson Welles's Touch of Evil
  - Barbara Zicka Smith for her work running the American Cinemateque
