= 1998 New York Film Critics Circle Awards =

64th New York Film Critics Circle Awards

64th New York Film Critics Circle Awards

January 10, 1999

Best Picture:
Saving Private Ryan

The 64th New York Film Critics Circle Awards, honoring the best in film for 1998, were announced on 16 December 1998 and given on 10 January 1999.

== Winners ==
- Best Actor:
  - Nick Nolte - Affliction
  - Runners-up: Ian McKellen - Gods and Monsters and Brendan Gleeson - The General
- Best Actress:
  - Cameron Diaz - There's Something About Mary
  - Runners-up: Fernanda Montenegro - Central Station (Central do Brasil) and Renée Zellweger - One True Thing and A Price Above Rubies
- Best Cinematography:
  - John Toll - The Thin Red Line
- Best Director:
  - Terrence Malick - The Thin Red Line
  - Runners-up: Steven Spielberg - Saving Private Ryan and Paul Schrader - Affliction
- Best Film:
  - Saving Private Ryan
  - Runners-up: Affliction and Happiness
- Best First Film:
  - Richard Kwietniowski - Love and Death on Long Island
  - Runners-up: Don Roos - The Opposite of Sex and Vincent Gallo - Buffalo '66
- Best Foreign Language Film:
  - The Celebration (Festen) • Denmark/Sweden
  - Runners-up: Central Station (Central do Brasil) • Brazil/France and Taste of Cherry (Ta'm e guilass) • Iran
- Best Non-Fiction Film:
  - The Farm: Angola, USA
  - Runner-up: The Cruise
- Best Screenplay:
  - Marc Norman and Tom Stoppard - Shakespeare in Love
  - Runners-up: Todd Solondz - Happiness and Wes Anderson and Owen Wilson - Rushmore
- Best Supporting Actor:
  - Bill Murray - Rushmore
  - Runner-up: Dylan Baker - Happiness
- Best Supporting Actress:
  - Lisa Kudrow - The Opposite of Sex
  - Runner-up: Judi Dench - Shakespeare in Love
- Special Award:
  - Rick Schmidlin - Touch of Evil (for the reworked version)
