= Topiltzin =

Topiltzin (or Topiltzín in Spanish orthography; from Classical Nahuatl topiltzin "our prince / divine lord") may refer to

- topiltzin, a name or title implying divinity, commonly associated with the pre-Columbian central Mexican deity Quetzalcoatl
- Topiltzin Ce Acatl Quetzalcoatl, a mythologised figure supposed to have been a 10th-century ruler in Tollan (Tula), the "Toltec" capital in pre-Columbian Mexico
- C.D. Topiltzín, a football club (Club Deportivo) in El Salvador
- Topiltzin, the lead character in the 2000 Mexican film, The Other Conquest (La Otra Conquista)
- León Topiltzin, Creative Director/Film Director from Mexico City.
