= The Truman Show =

1998 film by Peter Weir

- Theatrical release poster
- Directed by: Peter Weir
- Written by: Andrew Niccol
- Produced by: Scott Rudin; Andrew Niccol; Edward S. Feldman; Adam Schroeder
- Starring: Jim Carrey; Laura Linney; Noah Emmerich; Natascha McElhone; Holland Taylor; Ed Harris
- Cinematography: Peter Biziou
- Edited by: William Anderson; Lee Smith
- Music by: Burkhard Dallwitz; Philip Glass; Wojciech Kilar
- Production company: Scott Rudin Productions
- Distributed by: Paramount Pictures
- Release dates: June 1, 1998 (Los Angeles); June 5, 1998 (United States)
- Running time: 103 minutes
- Country: United States
- Language: English
- Budget: $60 million
- Box office: $264 million

The Truman Show is a 1998 American comedy-drama film directed by Peter Weir, and written and co-produced by Andrew Niccol. It stars Jim Carrey as Truman Burbank, a man who is unaware that he is living on a colossal soundstage, and that his life is the subject of a reality television show. The supporting cast includes Laura Linney, Ed Harris, Noah Emmerich, Natascha McElhone, Holland Taylor, and Paul Giamatti.

Niccol's original spec script was more of a science-fiction thriller, with the story set in New York City. Producer Scott Rudin purchased the script and set up production at Paramount Pictures. Brian De Palma was to direct before Weir signed on as director, making the film for $60 million—$20 million less than the original estimate. Niccol rewrote the script while the crew was waiting for Carrey to sign. The majority of filming took place at Seaside, Florida, a master-planned community located in the Florida Panhandle.

The Truman Show held its world premiere in Los Angeles on June 1, 1998, and was released in North America on June 5. It was a financial success, grossing $264 million worldwide, receiving critical acclaim, and earned numerous nominations at the 71st Academy Awards, 56th Golden Globe Awards, 52nd British Academy Film Awards, and 25th Saturn Awards. The Truman Show has been analyzed as an exploration of simulated reality, existentialism, surveillance, metaphilosophy, privacy, and reality television, and as a genre-blending work that features elements of romantic comedy, psychological drama, science fiction, metafiction and social satire. The Library of Congress selected it for preservation in the National Film Registry in 2025 as "culturally, historically or aesthetically significant".

== Plot ==
Selected at birth and legally adopted by a television studio following an unwanted pregnancy, Truman Burbank is the unsuspecting star of The Truman Show, a reality television program filmed and broadcast worldwide, 24/7, through hidden cameras. Truman's hometown, Seahaven Island, is set inside an enormous soundstage in Los Angeles, which allows Christof, the show's creator and executive producer, to control nearly all aspects of Truman's life. Truman's world is populated by actors and crew members who serve as his community while keeping him from discovering the truth. To prevent Truman from escaping, Christof has orchestrated various scenarios such as the "death" of Truman's father in a boating accident to instill thalassophobia, and has the cast reinforce Truman's anxieties with messages about the dangers of traveling and the virtues of staying home.

Though the producers intend for Truman to fall in love with and marry a woman named Meryl, he develops feelings for an extra named Sylvia. Sympathetic to Truman's plight, Sylvia tries to tell him the truth, but is promptly fired and removed from the set. Truman marries Meryl, but their relationship is stilted and passionless, and he continues to dream of traveling to Fiji, where he was told Sylvia had moved, and living a happy life with her. In the real world, Sylvia joins "Free Truman", an activist group that calls for Truman's liberation from the show.

As the show approaches its thirtieth anniversary, Truman notices unusual occurrences such as a stage light falling from the sky; an isolated patch of rain that falls only over him; a radio transmission describing his movements; and the reappearance of his father, who is rushed away by crew members and put on a bus before Truman can confront him. Inferring that the city somehow revolves around him, Truman questions his life and asks his closest confidants to help him solve the mystery.

Truman's suspicions culminate in an attempt to escape the island, but increasingly implausible occurrences block his path. Eventually, he is caught and returned home under a flimsy pretext. There, he confronts Meryl and challenges the sincerity of their marriage. As he holds her at knifepoint, Meryl breaks character to call for help and is removed from the show.

Hoping to bring Truman back to a controllable state, Christof reintroduces his father to the show under the guise of him having developed amnesia following the accident. The show regains its ratings, and Truman seems to return to his routines. One night, however, Christof discovers that Truman has begun sleeping in his basement. Disturbed by this change in behavior, Christof sends Truman's best friend Marlon to visit and discovers that Truman has disappeared through a makeshift tunnel. Christof suspends the broadcast for the first time in its history, leading to record viewing numbers.

Truman is found sailing away from Seahaven, having conquered his fear of water. Christof resumes the transmission and, unable to fetch Truman by rescue boat, creates a violent storm in an attempt to capsize Truman's boat, ignoring the protests of the executive producers and his assistants. Truman nearly drowns but continues to sail until his boat strikes the wall of the soundstage. He finds a staircase leading to an exit door. As Truman contemplates leaving, Christof speaks to him, revealing the truth about the show and encouraging him to stay by claiming that there is no more truth in the real world than in his artificial one. Truman utters his catchphrase—"In case I don't see ya, good afternoon, good evening, and good night"—before bowing to the audience and exiting. Sylvia races to greet him as the executive producers end the program with a shot of the open exit door, leaving Christof devastated. As the broadcast shuts down, viewers around the world celebrate Truman's escape before switching channels.

== Cast ==
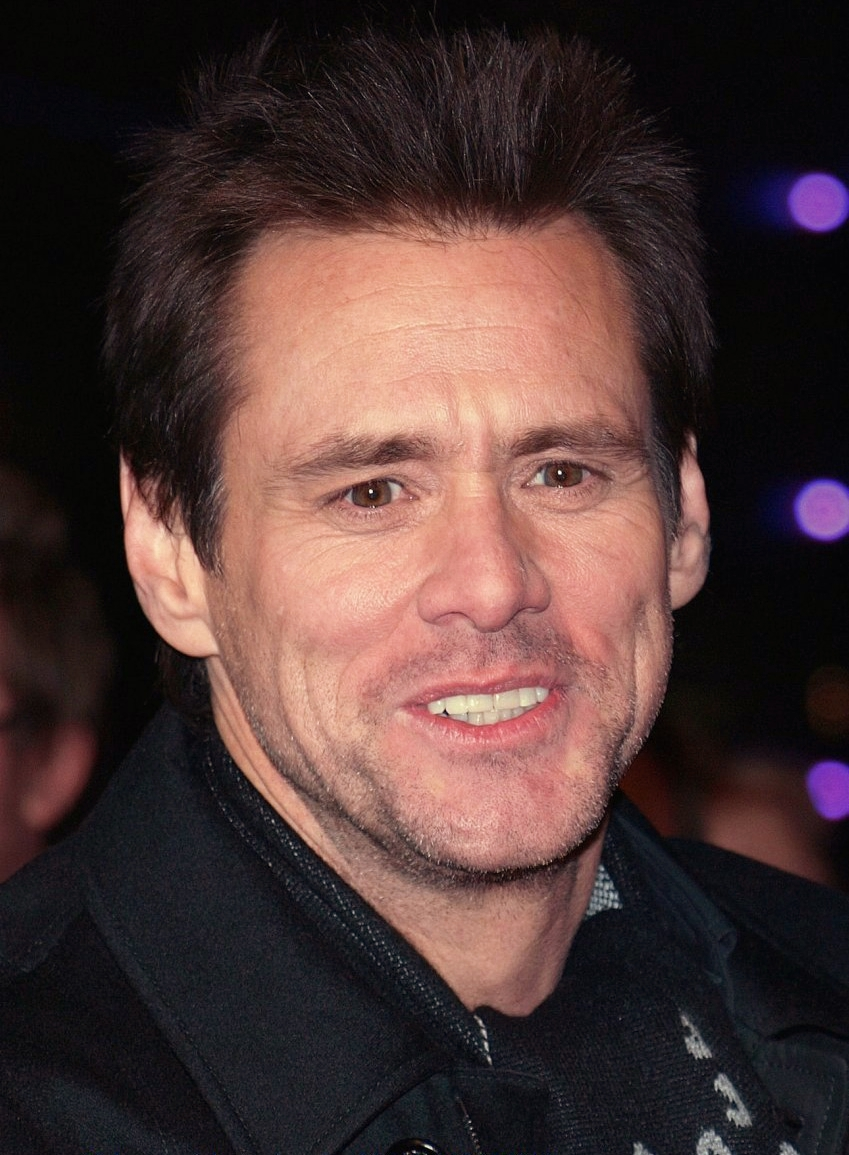
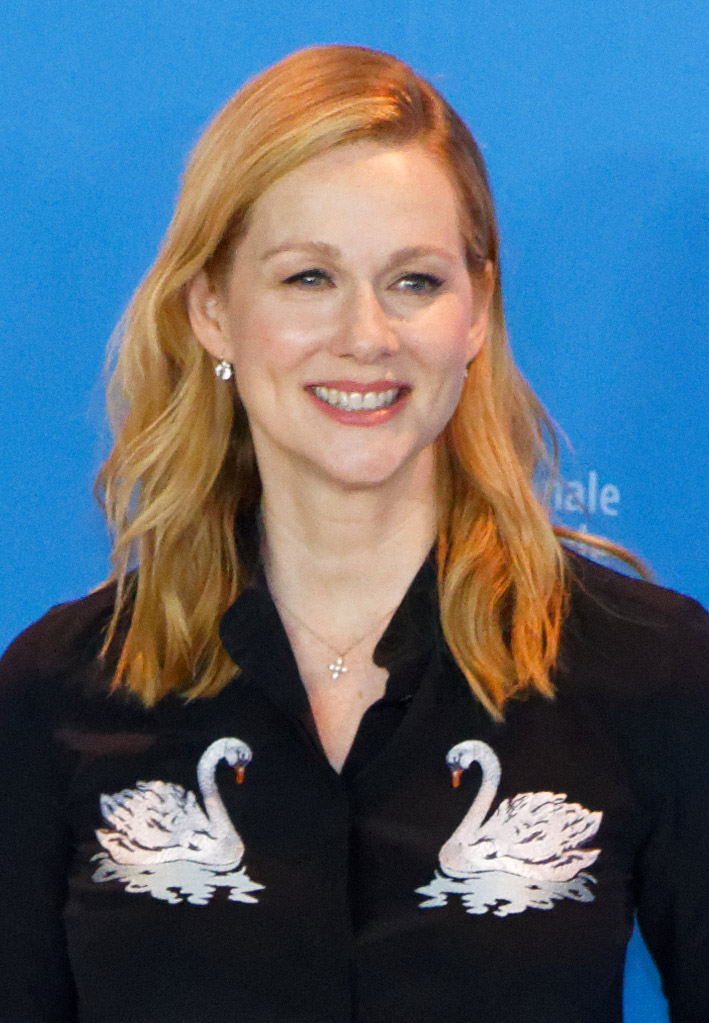
Left to right: Jim Carrey (pictured in 2008), Ed Harris (2026), and Laura Linney (2017)
- Jim Carrey as Truman Burbank
  - Blair Slater as young Truman
- Ed Harris as Christof, the creator and director of the in-universe show in which Truman lives
- Laura Linney as Hannah Gill, who plays Meryl, Truman's wife
- Noah Emmerich as Louis Coltrane, who plays Marlon, Truman's best friend
- Natascha McElhone as Lauren/Sylvia; Sylvia met Truman while playing Lauren, Truman's college schoolmate, who was originally just a background character, but whom Truman fell for
- Holland Taylor as Truman's mother, as portrayed by an in-universe actress
- Brian Delate as Truman's father, as portrayed by an in-universe actor
- Paul Giamatti as Simeon, a control room director
- Una Damon as Chloe, Christof's control room assistant
- Philip Baker Hall and John Pleshette as network executives
- Peter Krause as Truman's boss, as portrayed by an in-universe actor
- Heidi Schanz as Vivien, a woman positioned to be Truman's next love interest after Meryl, as portrayed by an in-universe actress
- Harry Shearer as Mike Michaelson, a TV talk show host

== Production ==
=== Development ===
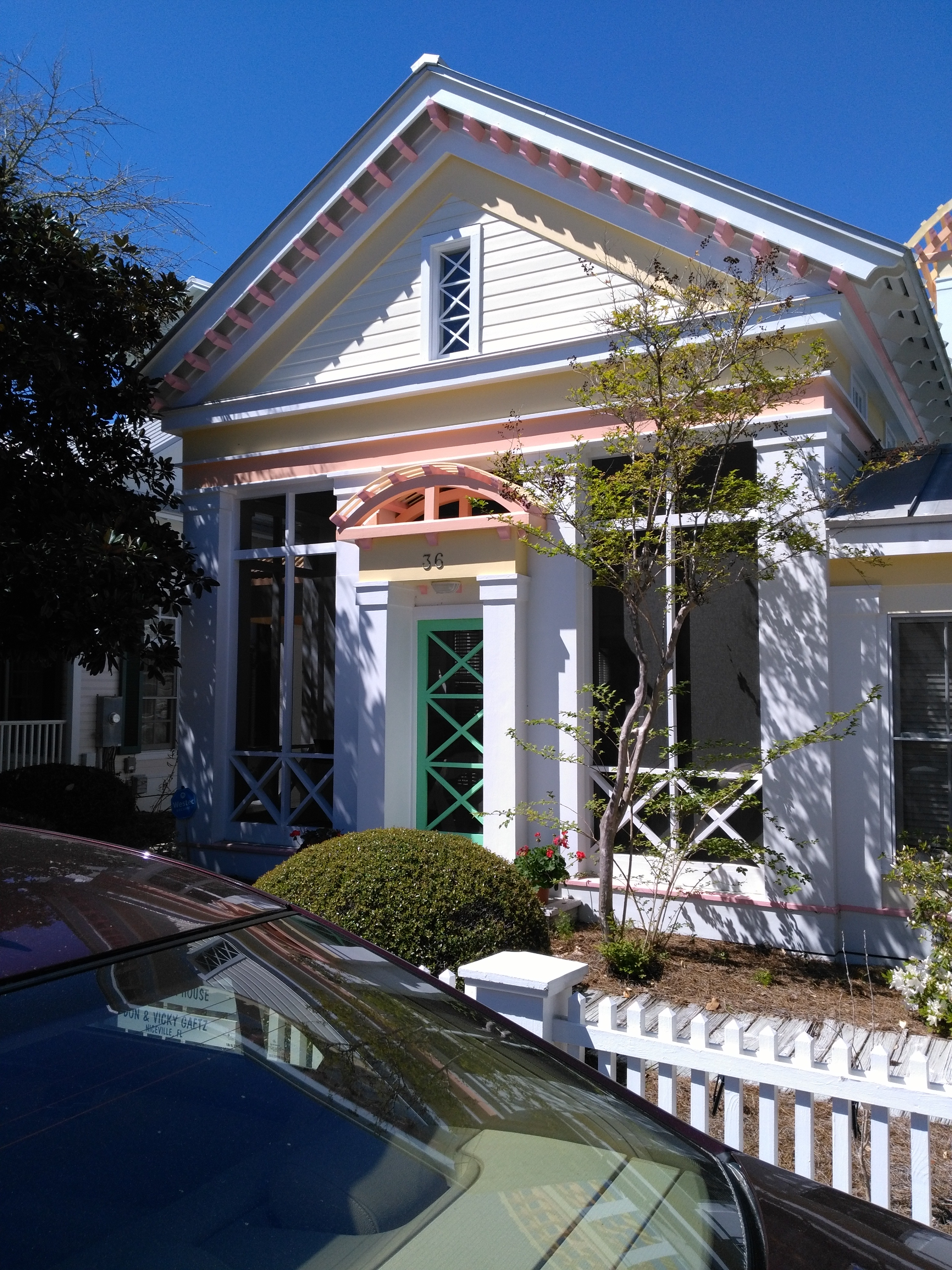
This house in Seaside, Florida, served as Truman's home. The house is owned by the Gaetz family, which includes U.S. politicians Don and Matt Gaetz.

Andrew Niccol completed a one-page film treatment titled The Malcolm Show in May 1991. The original draft was more in tone of a science fiction thriller, with the story set in New York City. Niccol stated, "I think everyone questions the authenticity of their lives at certain points. It's like when kids ask if they're adopted." In the fall of 1993, producer Scott Rudin purchased the script for slightly over $1 million. Paramount Pictures agreed to distribute. Part of the deal called for Niccol to make his directing debut, though Paramount executives felt the estimated $80 million budget would be too high for him. In addition, Paramount wanted to go with an A-list director, paying Niccol extra money "to step aside". Brian De Palma was under negotiations to direct before he left United Talent Agency (UTA) in March 1994. Directors who were considered after De Palma's departure included Tim Burton, Sam Raimi, Terry Gilliam, David Cronenberg, Barry Sonnenfeld and Steven Spielberg before Peter Weir signed on in early 1995, following a recommendation of Niccol. Bryan Singer wanted to direct but Paramount decided to go with the more experienced Weir.

Weir wanted the film to be funnier, feeling that Niccol's script was too dark, and declaring, "where [Niccol] had it depressing, I could make it light. It could convince audiences they could watch a show in this scope 24/7." Niccol wrote sixteen drafts of the script before Weir considered the script ready for filming. Later in 1995, Jim Carrey signed to star, but because of commitments with The Cable Guy and Liar Liar, he would not be ready to start filming for at least another year. Weir felt Carrey was perfect for the role and opted to wait for another year rather than recast the role. Niccol rewrote the script twelve times, while Weir created a fictionalized book about the show's history. He envisioned backstories for the characters and encouraged actors to do the same.

Weir scouted locations in Eastern Florida but was dissatisfied with the landscapes. Sound stages at Universal Studios were reserved for the story's setting of Seahaven before Weir's wife Wendy Stites introduced him to Seaside, Florida, a "master-planned community" located in the Florida Panhandle. Pre-production offices were immediately opened in Seaside, where the majority of filming took place. The scenes of Truman's house were filmed at a residence owned by the Gaetz family, which included Florida State Senator Don Gaetz and U.S. representative Matt Gaetz. The scene at the Seahaven Nuclear Power Station was filmed outside the front entrance of the Lansing Smith Generating Plant at Lynn Haven, operated at the time by Gulf Power. Other scenes were shot at Paramount Studios in Los Angeles, California. Norman Rockwell paintings and 1960s postcards were used as inspiration for the design. Weir, Peter Biziou and Dennis Gassner researched surveillance techniques for certain shots.

=== Casting ===
Though Robin Williams was considered for the role of Truman, Weir decided he wanted Carrey after seeing him in Ace Ventura: Pet Detective, citing that Carrey's performance reminded him of Charlie Chaplin. Gary Oldman did test footage for the role. Carrey took the role so he would be known as a multifaceted actor, rather than being typecast in comedic roles. Carrey, who was then normally paid $20 million per film, agreed to do The Truman Show for $12 million. Carrey also said it was the fastest that he ever accepted a role. Carrey brought his own innovations to the role, including the idea for the scene in which Truman declares "this planet Trumania of the Burbank galaxy" to the bathroom mirror.

The Truman Show started production with Dennis Hopper in the role of Christof, but he left in April 1997 soon after filming began due to "creative differences". Hopper later stated that he was fired after two days because Weir and producer Scott Rudin had made a deal that if they did not both approve of Hopper's performance, they would replace him. A number of other actors turned down the role after Hopper's departure, until Ed Harris agreed to step in after meeting them in Malibu. Harris later stated that he pitched the notion of making Christof a hunchback, but Weir did not like the idea.

After Laura Linney was hired to play the actress pretending to be Meryl, Truman's wife, she studied Sears catalogs from the 1950s to develop her character's poses.

=== Filming ===
Filming took place from December 9, 1996, to April 21, 1997. Its overall look was influenced by television images, particularly commercials: many shots have characters leaning into the lens with their eyes wide open, and the interior scenes are heavily lit because Weir wanted to remind viewers that "in this world, everything was for sale". Those involved in visual effects found the work difficult to make because 1997 was the year many visual effects companies were trying to convert to computer-generated imagery (CGI). CGI was used to create the upper halves of some of the larger buildings in the downtown set. Craig Barron, one of the effects supervisors, said that these digital models did not have to look as detailed and weathered as they normally would in a film because of the artificial look of the entire town, although they did imitate slight blemishes found in the physical buildings.

== Soundtrack ==
The Truman Show: Music from the Motion Picture was composed by Burkhard Dallwitz. Dallwitz was hired after Peter Weir received a tape of his work while in Australia for the post-production. Some parts of the soundtrack were composed by Philip Glass. Philip Glass also appears, playing his composition "Truman Sleeps".

Also featured are Frédéric Chopin's second movement (Romanze-Larghetto) from his First Piano Concerto, performed by the New Symphony Orchestra of London under the direction of Stanisław Skrowaczewski with pianist Artur Rubinstein; Wojciech Kilar's Father Kolbe's Preaching performed by the Warsaw National Philharmonic Orchestra; as well as the song "20th Century Boy" performed by rockabilly band The Big Six.

== Themes ==
=== Media ===
"This was a dangerous film to make because it couldn't happen. How ironic."

— Director Peter Weir on The Truman Show predicting the rise of reality television

Ronald Bishop's paper in the Journal of Communication Inquiry suggested The Truman Show showcased the power of the media. Truman's life inspires audiences around the world, meaning their lives are controlled by his. Bishop commented, "In the end, the power of the media is affirmed rather than challenged. In the spirit of Antonio Gramsci's concept of hegemony, these films and television programs co-opt our enchantment (and disenchantment) with the media and sell it back to us."

Journalist Erik Sofge surmised that the story reflects the falseness of reality television. "Truman simply lives, and the show's popularity is its straightforward voyeurism. And, like Big Brother, Survivor, and every other reality show on the air, none of his environment is actually real." Weir declared, "There has always been this question: Is the audience getting dumber? Or are we filmmakers patronizing them? Is this what they want? Or is this what we're giving them? But the public went to my film in large numbers. And that has to be encouraging." In her essay "Reading The Truman Show inside out", Simone Knox argues that the film tries to blur the objective perspective and the show-within-the-film. Knox also draws a floor plan of the camera angles of the first scene.

=== Psychoanalytic interpretation ===
Psychoanalysts Michael Brearley and Andrea Sabbadini analyzed Truman's condition as:

"...at the start of the film is prototypically adolescent. (...) Truman feels trapped into a familial and social world to which he tries to conform while being unable to entirely identify with it, believing he has no other choice (other than through the fantasy of fleeing to a deserted antipodean island). (...) Eventually, Truman gains sufficient awareness of his condition to 'leave home'—developing a more mature and authentic identity as an adult, leaving his child-self behind and becoming a True-man."

The website of the 2022 Cannes Film Festival says that "Peter Weir and Andrew Niccol's The Truman Show (1998) is a modern reflection of Plato's cave, and the decisive [final] scene urges viewers to not only experience the border between reality and its representation but to ponder the power of fiction, between manipulation and catharsis."

=== Similarity to Utopia ===
Parallels can be drawn from Thomas More's 1516 book Utopia, in which More describes an island with only one entrance and only one exit. Only those who belonged to this island knew how to navigate their way through the treacherous openings safely and unharmed. This situation is similar to The Truman Show because there are limited entryways into the world that Truman knows. Truman does not belong to this utopia into which he has been implanted, and childhood trauma rendered him frightened of the prospect of ever leaving this small community. Utopian models of the past tended to be full of like-minded individuals who shared much in common, comparable to More's Utopia and real-life groups such as the Shakers and the Oneida Community. It is clear that the people in Truman's world are like-minded in their common effort to keep him oblivious to reality. The suburban "picket fence" appearance of the show's set is reminiscent of the "American Dream" of the 1950s. The "American Dream" concept in Truman's world serves as an attempt to keep him happy and ignorant.

=== Gnosticism ===
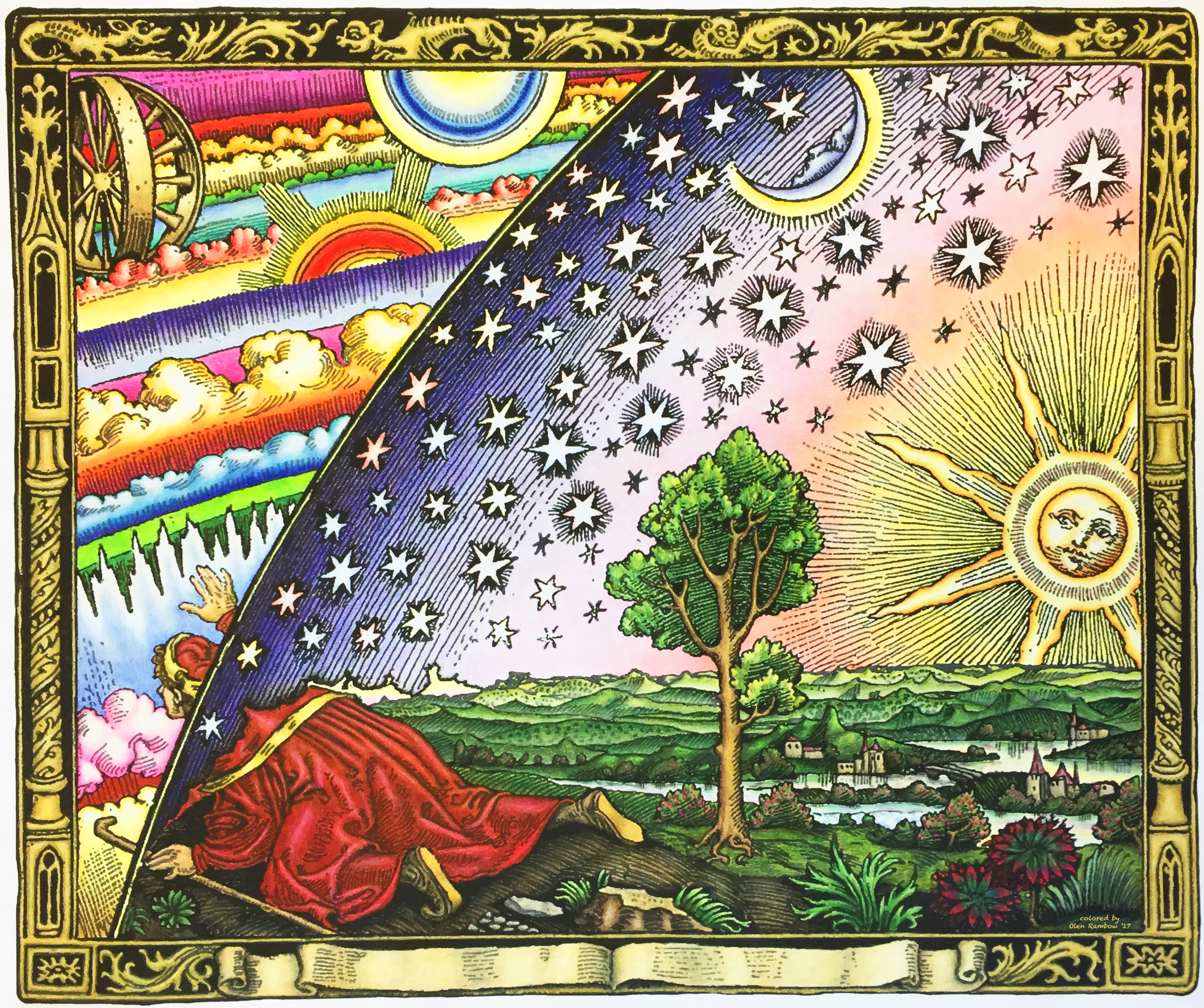
Flammarion, exiting the world

The Truman Show has themes that can be perceived as being gnostic, with its symbolism and Truman exiting the world echoed in the Flammarion engraving, exiting the world. Per screenwriter Chris Greenhalgh: "Slowly, Truman realises the truth and he, like the figure in the Flammarion Engraving, explores the artificial seam between the sky and the sea, wondering what might lie beyond the torn canvas."

== Release ==
Originally set for August 8, 1997, the theatrical release was pushed back initially to November 14, 1997, and then to the summer of 1998. NBC purchased broadcast rights in December 1997, roughly eight months before the release. In March 2000, Turner Broadcasting System purchased the rights, and now airs the film on TBS.

=== Home media ===
Paramount Home Entertainment released The Truman Show on VHS on January 12, 1999, followed by DVD on January 26 that same year, and a "Special Edition" re-release on August 23, 2005. It was released on Blu-ray on December 30, 2008. An Ultra HD Blu-ray was released on July 4, 2023, for the film's 25th anniversary.

== Reception ==
=== Box office ===
The Truman Show opened with $31.5 million in its first weekend, ranking No. 1 at the domestic box office above A Perfect Murder, Godzilla and Hope Floats. It had the third-highest opening weekend of 1998 at the time, after Godzilla and Deep Impact. It generated $20 million the following weekend, beating newcomers Six Days, Seven Nights and Can't Hardly Wait. Overall, it spent its first two weeks at the No. 1 spot. During its third weekend, The Truman Show fell into third place behind The X-Files and Mulan with $12.4 million. It also spent its first seven weeks in the Top 10. The Truman Show grossed $125.6 million domestically (United States and Canada) and $138.5 million in other territories, for a worldwide total of $264.1 million, on a budget of $60 million.

=== Critical response ===
The Truman Show received widespread critical acclaim. On the review aggregator website Rotten Tomatoes, 94% of 160 critics' reviews are positive, with an average rating of 8.5/10. The website's consensus reads: "A funny, tender, and thought-provoking film, The Truman Show is all the more noteworthy for its remarkably prescient vision of runaway celebrity culture and a nation with an insatiable thirst for the private details of ordinary lives." Metacritic, which uses a weighted average, assigned The Truman Show a score of 90 out of 100, based on 30 critics, indicating "universal acclaim". Audiences polled by CinemaScore gave it an average grade of "B" on an A+ to F scale.

Roger Ebert gave The Truman Show four out of four and compared it to Forrest Gump (1994), saying it had the right balance of comedy and drama. He was also impressed with Jim Carrey's dramatic performance. Kenneth Turan of the Los Angeles Times wrote, "The Truman Show is emotionally involving without losing the ability to raise sharp satiric questions as well as get numerous laughs. The rare film that is disturbing despite working beautifully within standard industry norms." He named it the best movie of 1998. In June 2010, Entertainment Weekly named Truman one of the 100 greatest characters of the preceding 20 years.

James Berardinelli liked the approach of "not being the casual summer blockbuster with special effects", and he likened Carrey's "[charismatic], understated and effective" performance to those of Tom Hanks and James Stewart. Jonathan Rosenbaum of the Chicago Reader wrote, "Undeniably provocative and reasonably entertaining, The Truman Show is one of those high-concept movies whose concept is both clever and dumb." Tom Meek of Film Threat said The Truman Show was not funny enough but still found "something rewarding in its quirky demeanor".

=== Accolades ===
| Award | Category | Nominee(s) | Result | Ref. |
|---|---|---|---|---|
| Academy Awards | Best Director | Peter Weir | Nominated | |
| Academy Awards | Best Supporting Actor | Ed Harris | Nominated | |
| Academy Awards | Best Screenplay – Written Directly for the Screen | Andrew Niccol | Nominated | |
| American Comedy Awards | Funniest Actor in a Motion Picture (Leading Role) | Jim Carrey | Nominated | |
| Australasian Performing Right Association Awards | Best Film Score | Burkhard Dallwitz | Nominated | |
| Australian Film Institute Awards | Best Foreign Film | Scott Rudin | Nominated | |
| British Academy Film Awards | Best Film | Scott Rudin, Andrew Niccol, Edward S. Feldman, and Adam Schroeder | Nominated | |
| British Academy Film Awards | Best Direction | Peter Weir | Won | |
| British Academy Film Awards | Best Actor in a Supporting Role | Ed Harris | Nominated | |
| British Academy Film Awards | Best Original Screenplay | Andrew Niccol | Won | |
| British Academy Film Awards | Best Cinematography | Peter Biziou | Nominated | |
| British Academy Film Awards | Best Production Design | Dennis Gassner | Won | |
| British Academy Film Awards | Best Special Effects | Michael J. McAlister, Brad Kuehn, Craig Barron, and Peter Chesney | Nominated | |
| British Society of Cinematographers Awards | Best Cinematography in a Theatrical Feature Film | Peter Biziou | Nominated | |
| Chicago Film Critics Association Awards | Best Film | | Nominated | |
| Chicago Film Critics Association Awards | Best Director | Peter Weir | Nominated | |
| Chicago Film Critics Association Awards | Best Actor | Jim Carrey | Nominated | |
| Chicago Film Critics Association Awards | Best Screenplay | Andrew Niccol | Nominated | |
| Chicago Film Critics Association Awards | Best Original Score | Burkhard Dallwitz | Won | |
| Chlotrudis Awards | Best Screenplay | Andrew Niccol | Nominated | |
| Costume Designers Guild Awards | Excellence in Costume Design for Film | Marilyn Matthews | Nominated | |
| Critics' Choice Movie Awards | Best Picture | | Nominated | |
| Directors Guild of America Awards | Outstanding Directorial Achievement in Motion Pictures | Peter Weir | Nominated | |
| Empire Awards | Best Film | | Nominated | |
| European Film Awards | Best Non-European Film | Peter Weir | Won | |
| Film Critics Circle of Australia Awards | Best Foreign Film | | Won | |
| Florida Film Critics Circle Awards | Best Director | Peter Weir | Won | |
| Golden Globe Awards | Best Motion Picture – Drama | | Nominated | |
| Golden Globe Awards | Best Actor in a Motion Picture – Drama | Jim Carrey | Won | |
| Golden Globe Awards | Best Supporting Actor – Motion Picture | Ed Harris | Won | |
| Golden Globe Awards | Best Director | Peter Weir | Nominated | |
| Golden Globe Awards | Best Screenplay | Andrew Niccol | Nominated | |
| Golden Globe Awards | Best Original Score | Burkhard Dallwitz and Philip Glass | Won | |
| Golden Reel Awards | Best Sound Editing – Foreign Feature | Lee Smith, Karin Whittington, Rick Lisle, Peter Townend, Tim Jordan, Andrew Plain, Nicholas Breslin, and Maureen Rodbard-Bean | Nominated | |
| Hugo Awards | Best Dramatic Presentation | Peter Weir and Andrew Niccol | Won | |
| Los Angeles Film Critics Association Awards | Best Production Design | Dennis Gassner | Runner-up | |
| MTV Movie Awards | Best Movie | | Nominated | |
| MTV Movie Awards | Best Male Performance | Jim Carrey | Won | |
| Nastro d'Argento | Best Male Dubbing | Roberto Pedicini (for the dubbing of Jim Carrey) | Won | |
| National Board of Review Awards | Best Supporting Actor | Ed Harris | Won | |
| Online Film & Television Association Awards | Best Picture | Scott Rudin, Andrew Niccol, Edward S. Feldman, and Adam Schroeder | Nominated | |
| Online Film & Television Association Awards | Best Drama Picture | Scott Rudin, Andrew Niccol, Edward S. Feldman, and Adam Schroeder | Nominated | |
| Online Film & Television Association Awards | Best Director | Peter Weir | Nominated | |
| Online Film & Television Association Awards | Best Actor | Jim Carrey | Nominated | |
| Online Film & Television Association Awards | Best Drama Actor | Jim Carrey | Nominated | |
| Online Film & Television Association Awards | Best Supporting Actor | Ed Harris | Nominated | |
| Online Film & Television Association Awards | Best Original Screenplay | Andrew Niccol | Nominated | |
| Online Film & Television Association Awards | Best Cinematography | Peter Biziou | Nominated | |
| Online Film & Television Association Awards | Best Film Editing | William M. Anderson and Lee Smith | Nominated | |
| Online Film & Television Association Awards | Best Production Design | Dennis Gassner and Nancy Haigh | Nominated | |
| Online Film & Television Association Awards | Best Drama Score | Burkhard Dallwitz and Philip Glass | Won | |
| Online Film & Television Association Awards | Best Sound | | Nominated | |
| Online Film & Television Association Awards | Best Ensemble | | Nominated | |
| Online Film & Television Association Awards | Best Drama Ensemble | | Nominated | |
| Online Film & Television Association Awards | Best Titles Sequence | | Won | |
| Online Film & Television Association Awards | Best Cinematic Moment | "Truman Decides His Fate After Talking to Christof" | Nominated | |
| Online Film & Television Association Awards | Film Hall of Fame: Productions | | Inducted | |
| Online Film Critics Society Awards | Best Film | | Nominated | |
| Online Film Critics Society Awards | Best Director | Peter Weir | Nominated | |
| Online Film Critics Society Awards | Best Supporting Actor | Ed Harris | Nominated | |
| Online Film Critics Society Awards | Best Screenplay | Andrew Niccol | Won | |
| Online Film Critics Society Awards | Best Editing | William M. Anderson and Lee Smith | Nominated | |
| Satellite Awards | Best Art Direction | Dennis Gassner | Won | |
| Saturn Awards | Best Fantasy Film | | Won | |
| Saturn Awards | Best Actor | Jim Carrey | Nominated | |
| Saturn Awards | Best Supporting Actor | Ed Harris | Nominated | |
| Saturn Awards | Best Director | Peter Weir | Nominated | |
| Saturn Awards | Best Writing | Andrew Niccol | Won | |
| Southeastern Film Critics Association Awards | Best Picture | | 3rd Place | |
| Southeastern Film Critics Association Awards | Best Director | Peter Weir | Nominated | |
| Southeastern Film Critics Association Awards | Best Supporting Actor | Ed Harris | Won | |
| Valladolid International Film Festival | Golden Spike | Peter Weir | Nominated | |
| Writers Guild of America Awards | Best Screenplay – Written Directly for the Screen | Andrew Niccol | Nominated | |
| Young Artist Awards | Best Family Feature Film – Drama | | Nominated | |

== Legacy ==
In the decades since its release The Truman Show's exploration of surveillance and manufactured reality has been described as "prescient". It combined elements from various genres such as romantic comedy, psychological drama, science fiction, metafiction and social satire. In 2008, Popular Mechanics named The Truman Show as one of the 10 most prophetic science fiction films. In 2023, ACMI chronicled the modern societal developments that were predicted in The Truman Show, with writer Anthony Frajman noting "it foretold the rise of reality TV, mass surveillance, social media, influencer marketing and our increasing obsession with celebrity," along with "the 24-hour news cycle, product placement, parasocial relationships, the merging of entertainment and news." Journalist Erik Sofje deemed it an eerie coincidence that Big Brother made its debut a year after The Truman Show, and he also compared to the 2003 program The Joe Schmo Show: "Unlike Truman, Matt Gould could see the cameras, but all of the other contestants were paid actors, playing the part of various reality-show stereotypes. While Matt eventually got all of the prizes in the rigged contest, the show's central running joke was in the same existential ballpark as The Truman Show."

The poster for the 2022 Cannes Film Festival pays homage to The Truman Show and its final scene, with the Cannes Film Festival website stating: "Peter Weir and Andrew Niccol's The Truman Show (1998) is a modern reflection of Plato's cave and the decisive scene urges viewers to not only experience the border between reality and its representation but to ponder the power of fiction, between manipulation and catharsis."

The set design and setting of Seahaven inspired films with similar themes. Director Greta Gerwig consulted Weir for the inspiration for Barbie Land in the 2023 film Barbie, with the idea of creating it as an "interior soundstage world" reminiscent of Seahaven in The Truman Show. Director Jon M. Chu cited how The Truman Show and its setting influenced the thematic portrayal of the Land of Oz in the 2024 film Wicked, saying, "It helps create this idea of the rebelliousness that this new younger generation are discovering ... You start to see the truth about things that maybe you were taught differently." Comparisons have been drawn between The Truman Show and Free Guy (2021). In 2025, it was selected for preservation in the United States National Film Registry by the Library of Congress as being "culturally, historically or aesthetically significant."

=== The Truman Show delusion ===
Joel Gold, a psychiatrist at the Bellevue Hospital Center, revealed that by 2008, he had met five patients with schizophrenia (and had heard of another twelve) who believed their lives were reality television shows. Gold named the syndrome the "Truman Show delusion" and attributed the delusion to a world that had become hungry for publicity. Gold stated that some patients were rendered happy by their disease, while "others were tormented". One traveled to New York to check whether the World Trade Center had actually fallen, believing the 9/11 attacks to be an elaborate plot twist in his personal storyline. Another came to climb the Statue of Liberty, believing that he would be reunited with his high school girlfriend at the top and finally be released from the show. In August 2008, the British Journal of Psychiatry reported similar cases in the United Kingdom. The delusion has informally been referred to as "Truman syndrome", according to an Associated Press story from 2008. After hearing about the condition, Andrew Niccol said: "You know you've made it when you have a disease named after you."

== Possible sequel show ==
Screenwriter Andrew Niccol had pitched a sequel show to The Truman Show. This was his pitch:

There has been talk of doing a musical – believe it or not – or a series. When it's a different art form, I don't think it takes anything away from the original. In my version of a series, I thought it would be fun, if after Truman walked through the sky, the audience clamored for more (which you sense at the end of the film). I imagine there would be a network with multiple channels all starring a subject born on the show. If I set it in New York City, there would be a girl living on the Upper East Side, a boy from Harlem, a kid from Chinatown, etc. Since they are all on their own channel and move in their own circles, they are never meant to meet. But at the end of the first season, the boy from Harlem and the rich girl find themselves drawn to each other. They both sense that the other is acting differently from anyone they've ever met ... because for the first time, they've met someone who is not acting! (In the second season, the Network would desperately try to kill off their romance.)

— Andrew Niccol

== See also ==
Articles

- Allegory of the cave
- List of films featuring surveillance
- Potemkin village
- Denpa Shōnen teki Kenshō Seikatsu
- Simulation hypothesis

Media

- "They", 1941 story by Robert A. Heinlein
- Time Out of Joint, 1959 novel by Philip K. Dick
- 36 Hours, 1965 film
- The Prisoner, 1967 television series
- "Special Service" 1989 episode of The Twilight Zone (1985 series)
- EDtv, 1999 film
- Seducing Doctor Lewis, 2003 film
- Disturbia, 2007 film
- The Grand Seduction, 2013 film
- "White Bear", 2013 episode of Black Mirror
- Free Guy, 2021 film
- "Joan Is Awful", 2023 episode of Black Mirror
- Jury Duty, 2023 television series
- Kirby and the World Beyond, 2027 videogame
