= Gods and Monsters (film) =

- Theatrical release poster
- Directed by: Bill Condon
- Screenplay by: Bill Condon
- Based on: Father of Frankenstein by Christopher Bram
- Produced by: Paul Colichman; Gregg Fienberg; Mark R. Harris
- Starring: Ian McKellen; Brendan Fraser; Lynn Redgrave; Lolita Davidovich
- Cinematography: Stephen M. Katz
- Edited by: Virginia Katz
- Music by: Carter Burwell
- Production companies: Showtime; Flashpoint; BBC Films; Regent Entertainment
- Distributed by: Lions Gate Films (United States); Downtown Pictures (United Kingdom)
- Release dates: 21 January 1998 (Sundance); 4 November 1998 (United States); 26 March 1999 (United Kingdom)
- Running time: 105 minutes
- Countries: United Kingdom; United States
- Language: English
- Budget: $10 million
- Box office: $6.5 million

Gods and Monsters is a 1998 period drama film written and directed by Bill Condon, based on Christopher Bram's 1995 novel Father of Frankenstein. The film stars Ian McKellen, Brendan Fraser, Lynn Redgrave, Lolita Davidovich, and David Dukes. Its plot is a partly fictionalized account of the last days of the life of film director James Whale (McKellen), known for directing Frankenstein (1931) and Bride of Frankenstein (1935). A veteran of World War I, the aged Whale develops a complicated relationship with his gardener, Clayton Boone (Fraser), a fictitious character originally created by Bram for the source novel.

An international co-production between the United Kingdom and the United States, Gods and Monsters is produced by Paul Colichman, Gregg Fienberg, and Mark R. Harris; Clive Barker served as executive producer. As well as featuring reconstructions of the production of the Bride of Frankenstein, the film's title is derived from a scene in Bride of Frankenstein, in which the character Dr. Pretorius toasts Dr. Frankenstein, "To a new world of gods and monsters!"

Gods and Monsters was nominated for three Academy Awards, including Best Actor for McKellen and Best Supporting Actress for Redgrave, and won for Best Adapted Screenplay. Despite receiving positive reviews, the film was a box office failure. It was later adapted as a play of the same name which premiered in London at the Southwark Playhouse in February 2015.

== Plot ==
In the 1950s, James Whale, the director of Frankenstein and Bride of Frankenstein, has retired. Whale lives with his long-time housemaid, Hanna, who loyally cares for him but disapproves of his homosexuality. He has suffered a series of strokes that have left him fragile and tormented by memories: growing up as a poor outcast, his tragic World War I service, and the filming of Bride of Frankenstein. Whale slips into his past and indulges in his fantasies, reminiscing about gay pool parties and sexually teasing a slightly embarrassed, starstruck fan. He battles depression, and at times contemplates suicide, as he realizes his life, his attractiveness, and his health are slipping away.

Whale befriends his young, handsome gardener, Clayton Boone, and the two begin a sometimes uneasy friendship as Boone poses for Whale's sketches. The two men bond while discussing their lives and dealing with Whale's spells of disorientation and weakness from the strokes. Boone, impressed with Whale's fame, watches Bride of Frankenstein on television as his friends mock the movie, his friendship with Whale, and Whale's intentions.

Boone assures Whale that he is straight and receives Whale's assurance that there is no sexual interest, but Boone storms out when Whale graphically discusses his sexual history. Boone later returns with the agreement that no such "locker room" discussions occur again. Boone is invited to escort Whale to a party hosted by George Cukor for Princess Margaret. There, a photo op has been arranged for Whale with "his Monsters": Boris Karloff and Elsa Lanchester from "ancient" movie fame. This event exacerbates Whale's depression. A sudden rainstorm becomes an excuse to leave.

Back at Whale's home, Boone needs a dry change of clothes. Whale can only find a sweater, so Boone wears a towel wrapped around his waist. Whale decides to try to sketch Boone one more time. After some minutes, he shows his sketches to Boone, disclosing that he has lost his ability to draw. To cheer him up, Boone drops his towel to pose nude. Whale makes him wear a World War I gas mask and then uses the opportunity to make a sexual advance on Boone, kissing his shoulder and neck, and forcefully reaches for his genitals. An enraged Boone fights off Whale, who confesses he had planned this because he wanted Boone to kill him and relieve him of his suffering. Boone refuses, puts Whale to bed, then sleeps downstairs. The next morning, Hanna is alarmed when she cannot find Whale, prompting a search by Boone and Hanna. Boone finds Whale floating dead in the pool as a distraught Hanna runs out, clutching a suicide note. Boone and Hanna agree that he should disappear from the scene to avoid a scandal.

A decade later, Boone and his son, Michael, watch Bride of Frankenstein on television. Michael is skeptical of his father's claim that he knew Whale, but Boone produces a sketch of the Frankenstein monster drawn by Whale, and signed, "To Clayton. Friend?". Boone later walks down a street at night in the rain, miming the movements of Frankenstein's monster.

== Cast ==
- Ian McKellen as James Whale
  - Brandon Kleyla as young James Whale
  - Kent George as 25-year-old James Whale
- Brendan Fraser as Clayton Boone
- Lynn Redgrave as Hanna
- Lolita Davidovich as Betty
- David Dukes as David Lewis
- Kevin J. O'Connor as Harry
- Mark Kiely as Dwight
- Jack Plotnick as Edmund Kay
- Rosalind Ayres as Elsa Lanchester
- Jack Betts as Boris Karloff
- Matt McKenzie as Colin Clive
- Martin Ferrero as George Cukor
- Cornelia Hayes O'Herlihy as Princess Margaret
- Pamela Salem as Sarah Whale
- Amir Aboulela as The Monster
- Marlon Braccia as Elizabeth Taylor
- Jesse James as Michael Boone
- Arthur Dignam as Ernest Thesiger (uncredited)

== Reception ==
Gods and Monsters received positive reviews from critics, with McKellen's, Fraser's and Redgrave's performances singled out for particular praise. Time Out called it "not a complicated film, but warm and clever".

The film has a 96% rating on Rotten Tomatoes, based on 67 reviews, with an average rating of 8.4/10. The site's critical consensus states: "Gods and Monsters is a spellbinding, confusing piece of semi-fiction, featuring fine performances; McKellen leads the way, but Redgrave and Fraser don't lag far behind." On Metacritic, the film has a score of 74 out of 100, based on reviews from 32 critics, indicating "generally favorable" reviews.

== Accolades ==
Award	Category	Recipient(s)	Result
Academy Awards	Best Actor	Ian McKellen	Nominated
Academy Awards	Best Supporting Actress	Lynn Redgrave	Nominated
Academy Awards	Best Screenplay – Based on Material Previously Produced or Published	Bill Condon	Won
Awards Circuit Community Awards	Best Actor in a Leading Role	Ian McKellen	Nominated
Awards Circuit Community Awards	Best Adapted Screenplay	Bill Condon	Nominated
Bram Stoker Awards	Best Screenplay	Bill Condon	Won (Note: Tied with Alex Proyas for Dark City.)
British Academy Film Awards	Best Actress in a Supporting Role	Lynn Redgrave	Nominated
British Independent Film Awards	Best British Film		Nominated
British Independent Film Awards	Best Director	Bill Condon	Nominated
British Independent Film Awards	Best Actor	Ian McKellen	Won
Chicago Film Critics Association Awards	Best Actor	Ian McKellen	Won
Chicago International Film Festival	Best Feature (Audience Choice Award)	Bill Condon	Won
Chlotrudis Awards	Best Movie		Won
Chlotrudis Awards	Best Director	Bill Condon	Nominated
Chlotrudis Awards	Best Actor	Ian McKellen	Won
Chlotrudis Awards	Best Supporting Actor	Brendan Fraser	Nominated
Chlotrudis Awards	Best Supporting Actress	Lynn Redgrave	Nominated
Critics' Choice Movie Awards	Best Picture		Nominated
Critics' Choice Movie Awards	Best Actor	Ian McKellen (also for Apt Pupil)	Won
Dallas–Fort Worth Film Critics Association Awards	Best Picture		Nominated
Deauville American Film Festival	Grand Prix	Bill Condon	Nominated
Deauville American Film Festival	International Critics' Award	Bill Condon	Won
Film Critics Circle of Australia Awards	Best Foreign Film		Nominated
Florida Film Critics Circle Awards	Best Actor	Ian McKellen (also for Apt Pupil)	Won
Ghent International Film Festival	FIPRESCI Prize	Bill Condon	Won
Ghent International Film Festival	Audience Award	Bill Condon	Won
GLAAD Media Awards	Outstanding Film – Wide Release		Won
Golden Globe Awards	Best Motion Picture – Drama		Nominated
Golden Globe Awards	Best Actor in a Motion Picture – Drama	Ian McKellen	Nominated
Golden Globe Awards	Best Supporting Actress – Motion Picture	Lynn Redgrave	Won
Independent Spirit Awards	Best Feature		Won
Independent Spirit Awards	Best Male Lead	Ian McKellen	Won
Independent Spirit Awards	Best Supporting Female	Lynn Redgrave	Won
Independent Spirit Awards	Best Screenplay	Bill Condon	Nominated
International Horror Guild Awards	Best Movie		Won
Kansas City Film Critics Circle Awards	Best Actor	Ian McKellen	Won
London Film Critics Circle Awards	British Supporting Actress of the Year	Lynn Redgrave	Won
Los Angeles Film Critics Association Awards	Best Actor	Ian McKellen	Won
Los Angeles Film Critics Association Awards	Best Music Score	Carter Burwell	Runner-up
National Board of Review Awards	Best Film		Won
National Board of Review Awards	Top Ten Films		5th Place
National Board of Review Awards	Best Actor	Ian McKellen	Won
National Society of Film Critics Awards	Best Actor	Ian McKellen	2nd Place
New York Film Critics Circle Awards	Best Actor	Ian McKellen	Runner-up
Online Film & Television Association Awards	Best Actor	Ian McKellen	Won
Online Film & Television Association Awards	Best Drama Actor	Ian McKellen	Won
Online Film & Television Association Awards	Best Drama Actress	Lynn Redgrave	Nominated
Online Film & Television Association Awards	Best Screenplay – Based on Material from Another Medium	Bill Condon	Nominated
Online Film & Television Association Awards	Best Drama Ensemble		Nominated
Online Film Critics Society Awards	Best Actor	Ian McKellen	Won
Producers Guild of America Awards	Outstanding Producer of Theatrical Motion Pictures	Paul Colichman, Gregg Fienberg and Mark R. Harris	Nominated
San Diego Film Critics Society Awards	Best Film		Won
San Diego Film Critics Society Awards	Best Actor	Ian McKellen	Won
San Sebastián International Film Festival	Golden Shell	Bill Condon	Nominated
San Sebastián International Film Festival	Special Jury Prize	Bill Condon	Won (Note: Tied with Where the Heart Is.)
San Sebastián International Film Festival	Best Actor	Ian McKellen	Won
Satellite Awards	Best Motion Picture – Drama		Nominated
Satellite Awards	Best Actor in a Motion Picture – Drama	Ian McKellen	Nominated
Satellite Awards	Best Actress in a Supporting Role in a Motion Picture – Drama	Lynn Redgrave	Nominated
Satellite Awards	Best Screenplay – Adapted	Bill Condon	Won
Saturn Awards	The President's Memorial Award		Won
Screen Actors Guild Awards	Outstanding Performance by a Male Actor in a Leading Role	Ian McKellen	Nominated
Screen Actors Guild Awards	Outstanding Performance by a Female Actor in a Supporting Role	Lynn Redgrave	Nominated
Seattle International Film Festival	Best Director	Bill Condon	Won
SESC Film Festival	Best Foreign Actor (Critics Award)	Ian McKellen	Won
SESC Film Festival	Best Foreign Actor (Audience Award)	Ian McKellen	Won
Southeastern Film Critics Association Awards	Best Actor	Ian McKellen	Runner-up
Toronto Film Critics Association Awards	Best Actor	Ian McKellen	Won
USC Scripter Awards		Bill Condon (screenwriter); Christopher Bram (author)	Nominated
Voices in the Shadow Dubbing Festival	Best Male Voice	Sergio Graziani (for the dubbing of Ian McKellen)	Won
Writers Guild of America Awards	Best Screenplay – Based on Material Previously Produced or Published	Bill Condon	Nominated

== Real life basis ==
James Whale had several men (and women) pose nude for him, and some of these are shown in the making-of featurette. Several of his paintings were bought by a collector and loaned to the studio for the making of this film.

Whale suffered from strokes towards the end of his life, which affected his mental abilities, and he was found dead in his pool. There were rumours that this was a homicide, but the evidence only pointed at suicide.

In the documentary included on the DVD and in interviews, novelist Christopher Bram explains that the character of Clayton Boone is completely fictitious.
