= Salvador Carrasco =

Mexican film director

- Born: 16 June 1967 (age 58); Mexico City, Mexico
- Occupations: Film Director; Professor

Salvador Carrasco (born 16 June 1967) is a Mexican film director and professor, best known for his 1999 feature film The Other Conquest. He is a professor and head of the film program at Santa Monica College.

== Career ==
Carrasco wrote and directed the film The Other Conquest, which was released in 1999 in Mexico and then rereleased for the United States in 2008. In 2002, Carrasco received the 2002-2003 Moseley Fellowship in Creative Writing at Pomona College. Carrasco was attached to direct a sequel to the film Dances with Wolves, but the project was not realized.

After his full-time tenure as course director of Advanced Directing at the Los Angeles Film School from 2003 to 2010, Carrasco established an associate’s degree and certificate film program for Santa Monica College.
