= Damián Delgado =

Mexican actor

- Born: Oaxaca, Mexico
- Occupation: Actor

Damián Delgado is a Mexican film actor, who starred in The Other Conquest and co-starred in the John Sayles film, Men With Guns. He also acted in These Onions Don't Make Me Cry, A Corner of Paradise and Under a Spell.

Born in Oaxaca, Mexico, Delgado has appeared frequently on television and in commercials. Delgado received a degree in Dramatic Literature and Theater from Mexico's Theater University Center, and he is also a dancer with extensive training in modern dance and classical ballet.
