= Chicago Film Critics Association Awards 1998 =

Annual US film awards ceremony

11th CFCA Awards

March 1, 1999

Best Film:
Saving Private Ryan

The 11th Chicago Film Critics Association Awards, given on 1 March 1999, honored the finest achievements in 1998 filmmaking.

== Winners ==
- Best Actor:
  - Ian McKellen - Gods and Monsters
- Best Actress:
  - Cate Blanchett - Elizabeth
- Best Cinematography:
  - The Thin Red Line - John Toll
- Best Director:
  - Terrence Malick - The Thin Red Line
- Best Film:
  - Saving Private Ryan
- Best Foreign Language Film:
  - La vita è bella (Life Is Beautiful), Italy
- Best Score:
  - "The Truman Show" - Burkhard Dallwitz
- Best Screenplay:
  - Shakespeare in Love - Marc Norman and Tom Stoppard
- Best Supporting Actor:
  - Billy Bob Thornton - A Simple Plan
- Best Supporting Actress:
  - Kathy Bates - Primary Colors
- Most Promising Actor:
  - Joseph Fiennes - Shakespeare in Love
- Most Promising Actress:
  - Kimberly Elise - Beloved
- Commitment to Chicago Award
  - Joe Mantegna
- Big Shoulders Awards
  - Gordon Quinn and Jerry Blumenthal
