= Shakespeare in Love =

1998 film by John Madden

- Theatrical release poster
- Directed by: John Madden
- Written by: Marc Norman; Tom Stoppard
- Produced by: David Parfitt; Donna Gigliotti; Harvey Weinstein; Edward Zwick; Marc Norman
- Starring: Gwyneth Paltrow; Joseph Fiennes; Geoffrey Rush; Colin Firth; Ben Affleck; Judi Dench; Simon Callow; Jim Carter; Martin Clunes; Antony Sher; Imelda Staunton; Tom Wilkinson; Mark Williams
- Cinematography: Richard Greatrex
- Edited by: David Gamble
- Music by: Stephen Warbeck
- Production company: The Bedford Falls Company
- Distributed by: Miramax Films (United States); Universal Pictures (International)
- Release dates: 11 December 1998 (United States); 29 January 1999 (United Kingdom)
- Running time: 123 minutes
- Countries: United States; United Kingdom
- Language: English
- Budget: $25 million
- Box office: $289 million

Shakespeare in Love is a 1998 romantic comedy period film directed by John Madden, and written by Marc Norman and Tom Stoppard. It stars Gwyneth Paltrow, Joseph Fiennes, Geoffrey Rush, Colin Firth, Ben Affleck, and Judi Dench. The film depicts a fictional love affair involving playwright William Shakespeare (Fiennes) and Viola de Lesseps (Paltrow) during the writing of Romeo and Juliet. Several characters are based on historical figures, and many of the characters, lines, and plot devices allude to Shakespeare's plays.

Shakespeare in Love was released on 11 December 1998 in the United States by Miramax Films, and 29 January 1999 in the United Kingdom, by Universal Pictures. The film received acclaim from critics, grossed $289 million against a $25 million budget, and was the ninth-highest-grossing film of 1998. It received numerous accolades, including winning three Golden Globe Awards (including Best Motion Picture – Musical or Comedy and Best Actress in a Motion Picture – Musical or Comedy for Paltrow), two Screen Actors Guild Awards (Outstanding Cast and Best Actress for Paltrow), and four British Academy Film Awards (including Best Film). It won a leading seven Oscars out of thirteen nominations at the 71st Academy Awards: Best Picture, Best Actress for Paltrow, Best Supporting Actress for Dench, Best Original Screenplay, Best Original Score, Best Art Direction, and Best Costume Design.

== Plot ==
In 1593 London, William Shakespeare is a sometime player in the Lord Chamberlain's Men actor company and playwright for The Rose theatre owner Philip Henslowe. Suffering from writer's block with a new comedy, Romeo and Ethel, the Pirate's Daughter, Shakespeare attempts to seduce Rosaline, mistress of Richard Burbage, owner of the rival Curtain Theatre, and to convince Burbage to buy the play from Henslowe. Shakespeare receives advice from friend and rival playwright Christopher Marlowe, but is despondent to learn Rosaline is sleeping with Master of the Revels Edmund Tilney. The desperate Henslowe, in debt to ruthless moneylender Fennyman, begins auditions anyway.

Viola de Lesseps, daughter of a wealthy merchant, who has seen Shakespeare's plays at court, disguises herself as a man named Thomas Kent to audition. Kent gains Shakespeare's interest with a speech from The Two Gentlemen of Verona, but runs away when Shakespeare questions her. He pursues Kent to Viola's house and leaves a note with her nurse, asking Kent to begin rehearsals at the Rose. Shakespeare sneaks into a ball at the house, where Viola's parents arrange her betrothal to Lord Wessex, an aristocrat in need of money. Dancing with Viola, Shakespeare is struck speechless. Confronted by Wessex, Shakespeare introduces himself as Christopher Marlowe. Wessex ejects "Marlowe" and threatens to kill him. Shakespeare finds Viola on her balcony, where they confess their mutual attraction before he is discovered by her nurse and flees.

Inspired by Viola, Shakespeare quickly transforms the play into what will become Romeo and Juliet. Rehearsals begin, with Thomas Kent as Romeo, the leading tragedian Ned Alleyn as Mercutio, and the stagestruck Fennyman in a small role. After Shakespeare discovers Viola's true identity, they begin a secret affair.

Viola is summoned to court to receive approval for her proposed marriage to Wessex. Shakespeare accompanies her, disguised as her nurse's female cousin, and anonymously persuades Wessex in public to wager £50 that a play can capture the true nature of love, the amount Shakespeare requires to buy a share in the Chamberlain's Men. Queen Elizabeth I declares that she will judge the matter.

Burbage learns Shakespeare has seduced Rosaline and cheated him out of payment for the play, and starts a brawl at the Rose with his company. The Rose players repel Burbage and his men and celebrate at the pub, where a drunken Henslowe lets slip to Viola that Shakespeare is married, albeit separated from his wife. News arrives that Marlowe has been murdered. A guilt-ridden Shakespeare assumes Wessex had Marlowe killed, believing him to be Viola's lover, while Viola believes Shakespeare to be the victim. Shakespeare appears at her church, allaying Viola's fears and terrifying Wessex, who believes he is a ghost. Viola confesses her love for Shakespeare, but both recognize she cannot escape her duty to marry Wessex. John Webster, an unpleasant boy who hangs around the theatre, spies on Shakespeare and Viola making love and informs Tilney, who closes the Rose for breaking the ban on women actors. Viola's identity is exposed, leaving Shakespeare without a stage or a lead actor, until Burbage offers his theatre and the heartbroken Shakespeare takes the role of Romeo. Following her wedding, Viola learns the play will be performed that day, and runs away to the Curtain. She overhears that the boy playing Juliet cannot perform, his voice having broken, and Henslowe asks her to replace him. She plays Juliet to Shakespeare's Romeo to an enthralled audience.

Just after the play has concluded, Tilney arrives to arrest everyone for indecency due to Viola's presence, but the Queen reveals herself in attendance and restrains him, pretending that Kent is a man with a "remarkable resemblance" to a woman. Powerless to end a lawful marriage, she orders Viola to sail with Wessex to Virginia. The Queen also tells Wessex, whom Webster reveals has followed Viola to the theatre, that Romeo and Juliet has won the bet for Shakespeare, and has Kent deliver his £50 to Shakespeare with instructions to write "something more cheerful next time, for Twelfth Night". Viola and Shakespeare say their goodbyes, and he vows to immortalize her, as he imagines the beginning of Twelfth Night, showing a woman named Viola disguised as a man after a voyage to a strange land.

== Cast ==
- Joseph Fiennes as William Shakespeare
- Gwyneth Paltrow as Viola de Lesseps
- Geoffrey Rush as Philip Henslowe
- Colin Firth as Lord Wessex
- Ben Affleck as Ned Alleyn
- Judi Dench as Queen Elizabeth I
- Simon Callow as Edmund Tilney
- Jim Carter as Ralph Bashford
- Martin Clunes as Richard Burbage
- Antony Sher as Dr. Moth
- Imelda Staunton as Nurse
- Tom Wilkinson as Hugh Fennyman
- Mark Williams as Wabash
- Daniel Brocklebank as Sam Gosse
- Nicholas Le Prevost as Sir Robert de Lesseps
- Jill Baker as Lady de Lesseps
- Patrick Barlow as Will Kempe
- Joe Roberts as John Webster
- Rupert Everett as Christopher "Kit" Marlowe
- John Inman as Lady Capulet in play
- Sandra Reinton as Rosaline
- Paul Bigley as Peter

== Production ==
The original idea for Shakespeare in Love was suggested to screenwriter Marc Norman in the late 1980s by his son Zachary. Norman wrote a draft screenplay which he presented to director Edward Zwick, which attracted Julia Roberts, who agreed to play Viola. However, Zwick disliked Norman's screenplay and hired the playwright Tom Stoppard to improve it (Stoppard's first major success had been with the Shakespeare-themed play Rosencrantz and Guildenstern Are Dead).

The film went into production in 1991 at Universal, with Zwick as director, but although sets and costumes were in construction, Shakespeare had not yet been cast, because Roberts insisted that only Daniel Day-Lewis could play the role. Day-Lewis was uninterested, and when Roberts failed to persuade him, she withdrew from the film, six weeks before shooting was due to begin. Zwick and the studio had tried to hold chemistry tests between Roberts and several unknown actors including Hugh Grant, Ralph Fiennes, Jeremy Northam, Rupert Graves, Colin Firth, and Sean Bean, but Roberts either skipped the meetings or found faults with them all. After a last screen test with Paul McGann, Roberts pulled out of the production, which Zwick attributed to insecurity about the pressure she was under to succeed in the role. The production went into turnaround, and Zwick was unable to persuade other studios to take up the screenplay. Canceling the film cost Universal $6 million.

Eventually, Zwick got Miramax Films interested in the screenplay, but Miramax chose John Madden as director over Zwick, who instead served as a producer. Miramax Films boss Harvey Weinstein acted as producer. For the president of a studio to have given himself a producer credit created a firestorm within the industry which resulted in what has come to be known as "the Harvey Rule," which stipulates that to earn the Producers Guild credit, a producer must have performed some real role in making the finished film. To justify his producer credit, Harvey claimed he took a leave of absence from his executive duties at Miramax to work on this movie, which longtime Miramax Films senior executive, Mark Gill, dismissed as "complete bullshit."

Weinstein persuaded Ben Affleck to take a small role as Ned Alleyn. Kate Winslet was offered the role of Viola after the success of Titanic, but she rejected it to pursue independent films. Winona Ryder, Diane Lane, and Robin Wright were also considered for the lead role. Principal photography began on March 2, 1998, and ended on June 10, 1998. The film was considerably reworked after the first test screenings. The scene with Shakespeare and Viola in the punt was re-shot, to make it more emotional, and some lines were re-recorded to clarify the reasons why Viola had to marry Wessex. The ending was re-shot several times, until Stoppard eventually came up with the idea of Viola suggesting to Shakespeare that their parting could inspire his next play.

Among the locations used in the production were Hatfield House, Hertfordshire (for the fireworks scene), Broughton Castle, Oxfordshire (which played the role of the de Lesseps mansion), the beach at Holkham in Norfolk, the chapel at Eton College, Berkshire, and the Great Hall of Middle Temple, London.

== References to Elizabethan literature ==
Much of the action of the film echoes that of Romeo and Juliet. Will and Viola play out the famous balcony and bedroom scenes; like Juliet, Viola has a witty nurse, and is separated from Will by a gulf of duty (although not the family enmity of the play: the "two households" of Romeo and Juliet are supposedly inspired by the two rival playhouses). In addition, the two lovers are equally "star-crossed" — they are not ultimately destined to be together (since Viola is of rich and socially ambitious merchant stock and is promised to marry Lord Wessex, while Shakespeare himself is poor and already married). Rosaline, with whom Will is in love at the beginning of the film, is a namesake of Romeo's love-interest at the beginning of the play. There are references to earlier cinematic versions of Shakespeare, such as the balcony scene pastiching the Zeffirelli Romeo and Juliet.

Many other plot devices used in the film are common in Shakespearean comedies and other plays of the Elizabethan era: the monarch moving unrecognized among the common people (cf. Henry V), the cross-dressing disguises, mistaken identities, the sword fight, the suspicion of adultery, the ostensible appearance of a ghost (cf. Hamlet and Macbeth), and the "play within a play". According to Douglas Brode, the film deftly portrays many of these devices as though the events depicted were the inspiration for Shakespeare's own use of them in his plays.

Christopher Marlowe is presented in the film as the master playwright whom the characters consider the greatest English dramatist of that time — this is historically accurate, yet also humorous, since the film's audience knows what will eventually happen to Shakespeare's reputation. Marlowe gives Shakespeare a plot for his next play, "Romeo and Ethel the Pirate's Daughter" Marlowe's Doctor Faustus is quoted repeatedly. A reference is also made to Marlowe's final, unfinished play The Massacre at Paris in a scene wherein Marlowe (Rupert Everett) seeks payment for the final act of the play from Richard Burbage (Martin Clunes). Burbage promises the payment the next day, so Marlowe refuses to part with the pages and departs for Deptford, where he is killed.

The child John Webster (Joe Roberts), who plays with mice, is a reference to a leading figure in the next, Jacobean, generation of playwrights. His plays (The Duchess of Malfi, The White Devil) are known for their 'blood and gore', which is humorously referred to by the child saying that he enjoys Titus Andronicus, and also saying of Romeo and Juliet, when asked his opinion by the Queen, "I liked it when she stabbed herself." Likewise, the Thames waterman who ferries Shakespeare to the estate of Robert de Lesseps, and tries to get Shakespeare's opinion of his own writing, references John Taylor.

== Plot precedents and similarities ==
After the film's release, certain publications, including Private Eye, noted strong similarities between the film and the 1941 novel No Bed for Bacon, by Caryl Brahms and S. J. Simon, which also features Shakespeare falling in love and finding inspiration for his later plays. In a foreword to a subsequent edition of No Bed for Bacon (which traded on the association by declaring itself "A Story of Shakespeare and Lady Viola in Love") Ned Sherrin, Private Eye insider and former writing partner of Brahms', confirmed that he had lent a copy of the novel to Stoppard after he joined the writing team, but that the basic plot of the film had been independently developed by Marc Norman, who was unaware of the earlier work.

The film's plot can claim a tradition in fiction reaching back to Alexandre Duval's Shakespeare amoureux ou la Piece a l'Etude (1804), in which Shakespeare falls in love with an actress who is playing Richard III. The writers of Shakespeare in Love were sued in 1999 by bestselling author Faye Kellerman. She claimed that the plotline was stolen from her 1989 novel The Quality of Mercy, in which Shakespeare romances a Jewish woman who dresses as a man, and attempts to solve a murder. Miramax Films spokesman Andrew Stengel derided the claim, filed in the US District Court six days before the 1999 Academy Awards, as "absurd", and argued that the timing "suggests a publicity stunt". An out-of-court settlement was reached, but the sum agreed between the parties indicates that the claim was "unwarranted".

== Historical inaccuracies ==
The film is "not constrained by worries about literary or historical accuracy" and includes anachronisms such as a reference to Virginia tobacco plantations, at a time before the Colony of Virginia existed. Another historical liberty concerns the central theme of Shakespeare's struggle to create the story of Romeo and Juliet, whereas in real life he simply adapted an existing story. Arthur Brooke translated the Italian verse tale The Tragical History of Romeus and Juliet into English in 1562, 32 years before Shakespeare's Romeo and Juliet.

A leading character is an Earl of Wessex, a title that in Shakespeare's time had not existed for over 500 years. The Sunday Telegraph reported that Prince Edward, Elizabeth II's third son, was drawn to the earldom of Wessex, which became his title upon marriage, after watching the film and seeing the character.

== Reception ==
=== Box office ===
Shakespeare in Love was among 1999's box office number-one films in the United Kingdom. The American and Canadian box office reached over $100 million and in the United Kingdom it grossed $34 million; including the box office from the rest of the world, the film took in over $289 million.

=== Critical reception ===
Rotten Tomatoes gives Shakespeare in Love a 92% approval rating based on 141 critical reviews, averaging 8.30/10. The website's critical consensus was: "Endlessly witty, visually rapturous, and sweetly romantic, Shakespeare in Love is a delightful romantic comedy that succeeds on nearly every level." On Metacritic, the film holds a score of 87 out of 100 based on 33 critical reviews, indicating "universal acclaim". Audiences polled by CinemaScore gave the film an average grade of "A" on an A+ to F scale.

Janet Maslin of The New York Times made the film an "NYT Critics' Pick", calling it "pure enchantment". According to Maslin, "Gwyneth Paltrow, in her first great, fully realized starring performance, makes a heroine so breathtaking that she seems utterly plausible as the playwright's guiding light."

Roger Ebert, who gave the film four stars out of four, wrote: "The contemporary feel of the humor (like Shakespeare's coffee mug, inscribed 'Souvenir of Stratford-Upon-Avon') makes the movie play like a contest between Masterpiece Theatre and Mel Brooks. Then the movie stirs in a sweet love story, juicy court intrigue, backstage politics and some lovely moments from Romeo and Juliet... Is this a movie or an anthology? I didn't care. I was carried along by the wit, the energy and a surprising sweetness." Filmmaker David Cronenberg was critical of the film saying it "really annoyed me" as it was "deconstructionist film-making, but it's also just Romeo and Juliet again".

The Sunday Telegraph claimed that the film prompted the revival of the title of Earl of Wessex. Prince Edward was originally to have been titled Duke of Cambridge following his marriage to Sophie Rhys-Jones in 1999, the year after the film's release. However, after watching Shakespeare in Love, he reportedly became attracted to the title of the character played by Colin Firth, and asked his mother Queen Elizabeth II to be given the title of Earl of Wessex instead.

== Awards and nominations ==
=== Oscar controversy ===
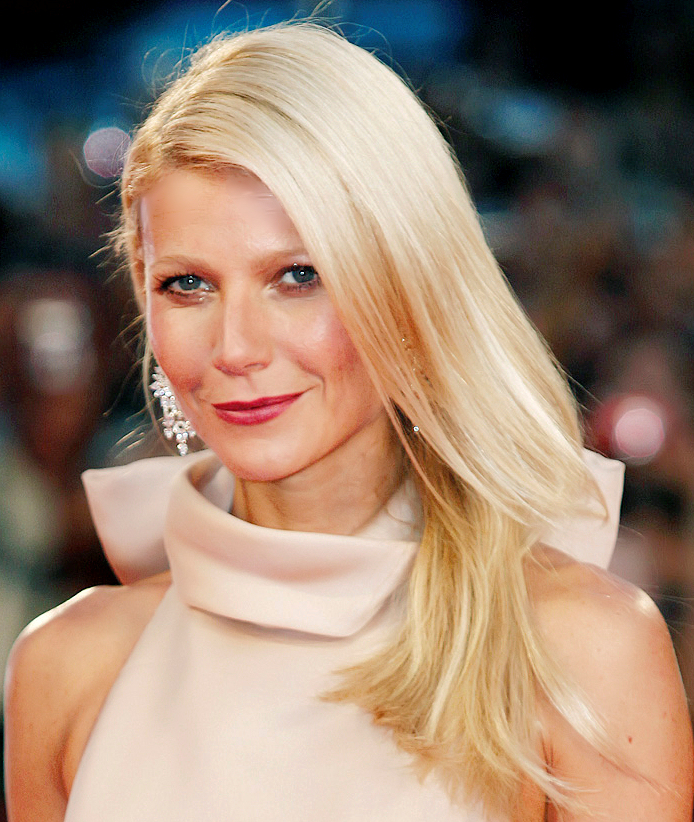
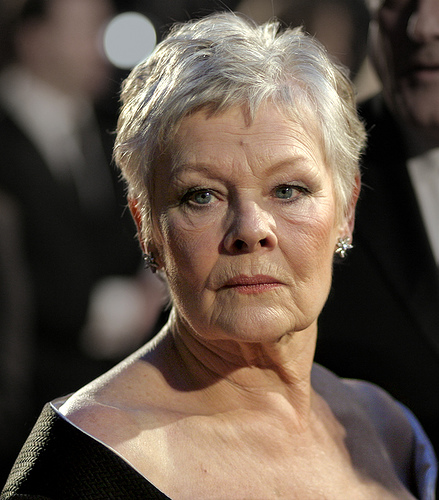
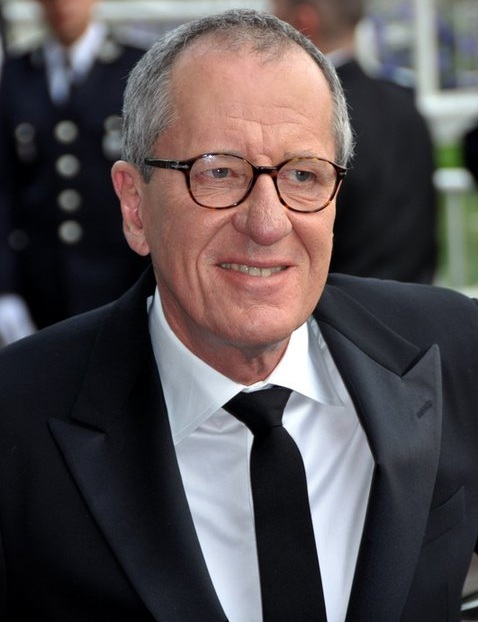
The performances of Gwyneth Paltrow, Judi Dench, and Geoffrey Rush garnered critical acclaim, earning them Academy Award nominations for Best Actress, Best Supporting Actress and Best Supporting Actor respectively, with Paltrow and Dench winning their categories.

Shakespeare In Love won the Best Picture Oscar at the 71st Academy Awards, controversially defeating critically favored Saving Private Ryan and becoming the first comedy to win the award since Annie Hall (1977). The academy's decision was criticized by many for giving the award to the film over Saving Private Ryan, and Gwyneth Paltrow winning Best Actress over frontrunner Cate Blanchett for Elizabeth.

Many industry pundits speculated that the Best Picture win was attributed to the awards campaign led by Weinstein. Weinstein was reported to have strong-armed the movie's talent into participating in an unprecedented blitzkrieg of press. Terry Press, an executive at DreamWorks at the time, said that Weinstein and Miramax "tried to get everybody to believe that Saving Private Ryan was all in the first 15 minutes". Mark Gill, an executive at Miramax at the time, claimed that Weinstein had a reliance on relatively cheap publicity. He stated, "This was not saying to the stars, 'O.K., you can go on a couple of talk shows to open the movie and do a weekend of interviews at a junket and thanks so much for helping'", Gill said. "That was just 'Good morning. You've got three more months of shaking hands and kissing babies in you.'"

In 2015, The Hollywood Reporter magazine said that it had interviewed hundreds of Academy members, indicating that, having to choose between Shakespeare in Love and Saving Private Ryan, a majority of them would award the Oscar for Best Picture to the latter. (The same article claimed that the results of four other Best Picture winners would also be different, referring to their survey as "a referendum on what films have stood the test of time".) In 2020, Glenn Close said in an interview with Peter Travers that she thought Paltrow winning Best Actress over Fernanda Montenegro for Central Station did not "make sense". In response, Montenegro said she was grateful for Close's praise, but she thought the Oscar should have gone to Blanchett.

=== Accolades ===
Award	Category	Nominee(s)	Result	Ref.
Academy Awards	Best Picture	David Parfitt, Donna Gigliotti, Harvey Weinstein, Edward Zwick, and Marc Norman	Won	
Academy Awards	Best Director	John Madden	Nominated	
Academy Awards	Best Actress	Gwyneth Paltrow	Won	
Academy Awards	Best Supporting Actor	Geoffrey Rush	Nominated	
Academy Awards	Best Supporting Actress	Judi Dench	Won	
Academy Awards	Best Screenplay – Written Directly for the Screen	Marc Norman and Tom Stoppard	Won	
Academy Awards	Best Art Direction	Art Direction: Martin Childs; Set Decoration: Jill Quertier	Won	
Academy Awards	Best Cinematography	Richard Greatrex	Nominated	
Academy Awards	Best Costume Design	Sandy Powell	Won	
Academy Awards	Best Film Editing	David Gamble	Nominated	
Academy Awards	Best Makeup	Lisa Westcott and Veronica Brebner	Nominated	
Academy Awards	Best Original Musical or Comedy Score	Stephen Warbeck	Won	
Academy Awards	Best Sound	Robin O'Donoghue, Dominic Lester, and Peter Glossop	Nominated	
American Society of Cinematographers Awards	Outstanding Achievement in Cinematography in Theatrical Releases	Richard Greatrex	Nominated	
Art Directors Guild Awards	Excellence in Production Design for a Feature Film	Martin Childs	Nominated	
Berlin International Film Festival	Golden Bear	John Madden	Nominated	
Berlin International Film Festival	Silver Bear	Marc Norman and Tom Stoppard	Won	
British Academy Film Awards	Best Film	David Parfitt, Donna Gigliotti, Harvey Weinstein, Edward Zwick, and Marc Norman	Won	
British Academy Film Awards	Best Direction	John Madden	Nominated	
British Academy Film Awards	Best Actor in a Leading Role	Joseph Fiennes	Nominated	
British Academy Film Awards	Best Actress in a Leading Role	Gwyneth Paltrow	Nominated	
British Academy Film Awards	Best Actor in a Supporting Role	Geoffrey Rush	Won	
British Academy Film Awards	Best Actor in a Supporting Role	Tom Wilkinson	Nominated	
British Academy Film Awards	Best Actress in a Supporting Role	Judi Dench	Won	
British Academy Film Awards	Best Original Screenplay	Marc Norman and Tom Stoppard	Nominated	
British Academy Film Awards	Best Cinematography	Richard Greatrex	Nominated	
British Academy Film Awards	Best Costume Design	Sandy Powell	Nominated	
British Academy Film Awards	Best Editing	David Gamble	Won	
British Academy Film Awards	Best Make-Up and Hair	Lisa Westcott	Nominated	
British Academy Film Awards	Best Original Film Music	Stephen Warbeck	Nominated	
British Academy Film Awards	Best Production Design	Martin Childs	Nominated	
British Academy Film Awards	Best Sound	Robin O'Donoghue, Dominic Lester, Peter Glossop, and John Downer	Nominated	
British Society of Cinematographers Awards	Best Cinematography in a Theatrical Feature Film	Richard Greatrex	Nominated	
Chicago Film Critics Association Awards	Best Film		Nominated	
Chicago Film Critics Association Awards	Best Actress	Gwyneth Paltrow	Nominated	
Chicago Film Critics Association Awards	Best Screenplay	Marc Norman and Tom Stoppard	Won	
Chicago Film Critics Association Awards	Most Promising Actor	Joseph Fiennes	Won	
Chlotrudis Awards	Best Director	John Madden	Nominated	
Chlotrudis Awards	Best Supporting Actor	Geoffrey Rush (also for Elizabeth)	Nominated	
Chlotrudis Awards	Best Supporting Actress	Judi Dench	Nominated	
Chlotrudis Awards	Best Screenplay	Marc Norman and Tom Stoppard	Nominated	
Critics' Choice Movie Awards	Best Picture		Nominated	
Critics' Choice Movie Awards	Best Original Screenplay	Marc Norman and Tom Stoppard	Won	
Critics' Choice Movie Awards	Breakthrough Artist	Joseph Fiennes (also for Elizabeth)	Won	
Directors Guild of America Awards	Outstanding Directorial Achievement in Motion Pictures	John Madden	Nominated	
Golden Globe Awards	Best Motion Picture – Musical or Comedy		Won	
Golden Globe Awards	Best Actress in a Motion Picture – Musical or Comedy	Gwyneth Paltrow	Won	
Golden Globe Awards	Best Supporting Actor – Motion Picture	Geoffrey Rush	Nominated	
Golden Globe Awards	Best Supporting Actress – Motion Picture	Judi Dench	Nominated	
Golden Globe Awards	Best Director – Motion Picture	John Madden	Nominated	
Golden Globe Awards	Best Screenplay – Motion Picture	Marc Norman and Tom Stoppard	Won	
Grammy Awards	Best Instrumental Composition Written for a Motion Picture, Television or Other Visual Media	Shakespeare in Love – Stephen Warbeck	Nominated	
Los Angeles Film Critics Association Awards	Best Screenplay	Marc Norman and Tom Stoppard	Runner-up	
National Board of Review Awards	Top Ten Films		5th Place	
National Society of Film Critics Awards	Best Supporting Actress	Judi Dench	Won	
National Society of Film Critics Awards	Best Screenplay	Marc Norman and Tom Stoppard	Nominated	
New York Film Critics Circle Awards	Best Supporting Actress	Judi Dench	Runner-up	
New York Film Critics Circle Awards	Best Screenplay	Marc Norman and Tom Stoppard	Won	
Producers Guild of America Awards	Outstanding Producer of Theatrical Motion Pictures	David Parfitt, Donna Gigliotti, Harvey Weinstein, Edward Zwick, and Marc Norman	Nominated	
Satellite Awards	Best Motion Picture – Musical or Comedy		Won	
Satellite Awards	Best Actress in a Motion Picture – Comedy or Musical	Gwyneth Paltrow	Nominated	
Satellite Awards	Best Actor in a Supporting Role in a Motion Picture – Comedy or Musical	Geoffrey Rush	Nominated	
Satellite Awards	Best Original Screenplay	Marc Norman and Tom Stoppard	Nominated	
Satellite Awards	Best Art Direction	Martin Childs	Nominated	
Satellite Awards	Best Cinematography	Richard Greatrex	Nominated	
Satellite Awards	Best Costume Design	Sandy Powell	Nominated	
Satellite Awards	Best Editing	David Gamble	Nominated	
Screen Actors Guild Awards	Outstanding Performance by a Cast in a Motion Picture	Ben Affleck, Simon Callow, Jim Carter, Martin Clunes, Judi Dench, Joseph Fiennes, Colin Firth, Gwyneth Paltrow, Geoffrey Rush, Antony Sher, Imelda Staunton, Tom Wilkinson, and Mark Williams	Won	
Screen Actors Guild Awards	Outstanding Performance by a Male Actor in a Leading Role	Joseph Fiennes	Nominated	
Screen Actors Guild Awards	Outstanding Performance by a Female Actor in a Leading Role	Gwyneth Paltrow	Won	
Screen Actors Guild Awards	Outstanding Performance by a Male Actor in a Supporting Role	Geoffrey Rush	Nominated	
Screen Actors Guild Awards	Outstanding Performance by a Female Actor in a Supporting Role	Judi Dench	Nominated	
Southeastern Film Critics Association Awards	Best Picture		2nd Place	
Southeastern Film Critics Association Awards	Best Actress	Gwyneth Paltrow	Runner-up	
Southeastern Film Critics Association Awards	Best Supporting Actress	Judi Dench	Runner-up	
Southeastern Film Critics Association Awards	Best Original Screenplay	Marc Norman and Tom Stoppard	Won	
Writers Guild of America Awards	Best Screenplay – Written Directly for the Screen	Marc Norman and Tom Stoppard	Won	

In 2005, the Writers Guild of America ranked its script the 28th greatest ever written.

American Film Institute recognition:

- AFI's 100 Years...100 Passions – #50

== Home media and rights ==
Initially, the film's home video releases were handled domestically by Disney's Buena Vista Home Entertainment (under the Miramax Home Entertainment banner), while outside the United States, home video releases were allocated to the film's international distributor Universal. The film was released on VHS and LaserDisc in the United States on August 10, 1999, by Miramax Home Entertainment, with a DVD following on December 7, 1999. In late 1999, the film received LaserDisc releases in Japan and Hong Kong. The Japanese and Hong Kong LaserDiscs were released by CIC Video, a joint venture created by Paramount and Universal to distribute their films outside North America. The Australian (Region 4) and British (Region 2) DVDs were released by Universal Pictures Home Entertainment.

In December 2010, Miramax was sold by The Walt Disney Company, their owners since 1993. That month, the studio was taken over by private equity firm Filmyard Holdings. Filmyard licensed the home media rights for several Miramax titles to Lionsgate, and on January 31, 2012, Lionsgate released Shakespeare in Love on a domestic Blu-ray. In 2011, Filmyard Holdings licensed the Miramax library to streamer Netflix. This streaming deal included Shakespeare in Love, and ran for five years, eventually ending on June 1, 2016.

Filmyard Holdings sold Miramax to Qatari company beIN Media Group in March 2016. In April 2020, ViacomCBS (now known as Paramount Skydance) acquired the rights to Miramax's library, after buying a 49% stake in the studio from beIN. This April 2020 deal included the U.S. rights to Shakespeare in Love, along with the rights to all other 700 titles from Miramax's library. The deal put Shakespeare in Love under the same corporate umbrella as its Oscar rival Saving Private Ryan, which Paramount co-released with DreamWorks, and later acquired full rights to after buying DreamWorks' live-action library in 2006.

Paramount Home Entertainment reissued Shakespeare in Love on DVD and Blu-ray on January 12, 2021, with this being one of many Miramax titles that they reissued around this time. On September 22, 2020, Paramount Home Entertainment also released a four film DVD set which included Shakespeare in Love and three other Miramax-produced Gwyneth Paltrow films (Emma, Bounce and View from the Top). Additionally, they issued the film on a two-disc double feature DVD with Emma on February 23, 2021. In the United States, the film was made available on Paramount's subscription streaming service Paramount+, as well as on their free streaming service Pluto TV.

== Stage adaptation ==
=== Lee Hall's Shakespeare in Love ===
In November 2011, Variety reported that Disney Theatrical Productions intended to produce a stage version of the film in London with Sonia Friedman Productions. This report came after Disney had already given up their ownership of the film by selling Miramax to Filmyard Holdings in December 2010. The production was officially announced in November 2013. Based on the film screenplay by Norman and Stoppard, it was adapted for the stage by Lee Hall. The production was directed by Declan Donnellan and designed by Nick Ormerod, the joint founders of Cheek by Jowl.

The production opened at the Noël Coward Theatre in London's West End on 23 July 2014, receiving rave reviews from critics. It was called "A joyous celebration of theatre" in The Daily Telegraph, "Joyous" in The Independent, and "A love letter to theatre" in The Guardian.

=== Japanese adaptation ===
From December 2016 to January 2017, Shakespeare of True Love (Japanese: シェイクスピア物語～真実の愛), a Japanese adaptation of Shakespeare in Love written by Shigeki Motoiki and Sakurako Fukuyama, was produced in Kanagawa Arts Theatre. It was not related to Lee Hall's play. Takaya Kamikawa played Will Shakespeare and Alisa Mizuki played Viola.

== See also ==
- BFI Top 100 British films

== Works cited ==
- Cronenberg, David (2006). David Cronenberg: Interviews with Serge Grünberg. Plexus Publishing. ISBN 0859653765.
