= Men with Guns =

- Theatrical release poster
- Directed by: John Sayles
- Written by: John Sayles
- Based on: A character from The Long Night of White Chickens by Francisco Goldman
- Produced by: R. Paul Miller; Maggie Renzi
- Starring: Federico Luppi; Damián Delgado; Damián Alcázar; Mandy Patinkin
- Cinematography: Slawomir Idziak
- Edited by: John Sayles
- Music by: Mason Daring
- Production companies: Independent Film Channel; Clear Blue Sky; Anarchist's Convention Films; Lexington Road Productions
- Distributed by: Sony Pictures Classics
- Release dates: August 30, 1997 (Telluride); March 27, 1998 (United States)
- Running time: 127 minutes
- Country: United States
- Languages: Spanish; Mayan; Guna; Nahuatl; Tzotzil; English
- Budget: $2.3 million
- Box office: $910,773

Men with Guns (Spanish: Hombres armados) is a 1997 American political drama film edited, written and directed by John Sayles, inspired by the 1992 novel The Long Night of White Chickens by Francisco Goldman. It stars Federico Luppi, Damián Delgado, Damián Alcázar and Mandy Patinkin. The executive producers were Lou Gonda and Jody Patton.

Set in an unnamed Latin American country, it is the story of one man's discovery of what actually happened in the political history of his nation as well as his students. It was filmed in Mexico and most of the crew were Mexican.

== Plot synopsis ==
Dr. Fuentes is a medical professor/doctor near his retirement and his wife has recently died. He taught a group of seven - he views this as one of his greatest accomplishments - that trains young people to provide health care to impoverished citizens in the outlying hill country, where small agricultural communities struggle to survive.

Fuentes has recently heard rumors that his former students are lost and possibly dead, so he musters up the courage and travels into the outlands to investigate. It is not until he begins his journey that he discovers a world much different than the one he had imagined existing for his students as he finds himself encountering guerrillas and soldiers. As Fuentes digs into the jungle in search of his students, he discovers that men with guns have reached them first, his students being menaced by many men with guns (Hombres Armados). This indicates military forces who use torture and execution to intimidate people. He discovers that the guerillas from opposition political groups are only marginally less aggressive.

On his journey he accumulates a few travelling companions: Padre Portillo, a fallen priest who has lost his faith; Domingo, a deserter from the Army without a country; Conejo, an orphan who survives by stealing; and Graciela, a woman who has turned mute after she was raped by the military. Fuentes finds that his journey is revealing but also perilous the deeper he ventures. He ends up travelling into the hill country, looking for his last student, who is rumored to be living in an Edenic village high in the mountains, safe from the violence which has engulfed the countryside. As the doctor and his companions get closer to this half-mythical place, the journey becomes a quest for both safety and an assurance for Fuentes that his life has had some meaning.

== Cast ==
- Don Francisco García as a man walking
- Federico Luppi as Dr. Fuentes
- Damián Delgado as Domingo, the soldier
- Dan Rivera Gonzalez as Conejo, the boy
- Tania Cruz as Graciela, the mute girl
- Damián Alcázar as Padre Portillo, the priest
- Mandy Patinkin as Andrew
- Kathryn Grody as Harriet
- Roverto Sosa as Bravo
- Carmen Madrid as Angela, Dr. Fuentes's daughter
- Esteban Soberanes as Raúl, Angela's fiancé
- Alejandro Springall as Carlos, Dr. Fuentes's son

== Background ==
Principal photography was done in thirty-seven shooting days in January and February 1997 and filmed in over forty locations.

John Sayles' films tend to be politically aware and social concerns are a theme running through most of his work. This film's idea came from his friends, one of whom was the novelist Francisco Goldman. He had an uncle who was a doctor in Guatemala and was involved in an international health program. A few years later he came to find out that most of his students, whom he had sent off to serve as rural doctors, had been murdered by the government that supported the program.

Sayles does not name the country in the film, and the music he uses is quite eclectic and not tied to any specific Latin American country. This is because Sayles did not want people to think that it can "only happen in El Salvador, that can only happen in Guatemala or Mexico". He felt the film has universal overtones and the events portrayed in the story could have happened anywhere on the planet.

=== Filming locations ===
The movie was filmed entirely in Mexico, in 40 locations, including: Mexico City; Ciudad Nezahualcóyotl; Pueblo Naranjal, Xonotzintla, Soledad Atzompa, Soledad de Doblado, Zongolica, and Jalapilla, all in Veracruz; Palenque and San José Babilonia, both in Chiapas.

== Release ==
Men with Guns was first presented at the Telluride Film Festival, Colorado, on August 30, 1997. A few days later its international debut was at the 1997 Toronto International Film Festival on September 5, 1997, which caused a small amount of confusion as Kari Skogland's film Men with Guns also debuted four days later at the same festival.

It opened in the United States on March 27, 1998.

The film was featured at various international film festivals, including: the Deauville Film Festival, France; the Donostia-San Sebastián International Film Festival, Spain; the Edinburgh International Film Festival, Scotland; the Helsinki International Film Festival, Finland; the Reykjavik Film Festival, Iceland; and others.

== Reception ==
=== Critical response ===
Roger Ebert, film critic writing for the Chicago Sun-Times, liked the film, and wrote, "Men With Guns is immensely moving and sad, and yet because it dares so much, it is an exhilarating film. It frees itself from specific stories about this villain or that strategy, to stand back and look at the big picture: at societies in collapse because power has been concentrated in the hands of small men made big with guns."

Critic Jack Mathews liked Sayles' straightforward unadorned style, and he wrote, "Men With Guns is a slow-paced trip, with a lot of translated conversation, and Sayles keeps it pure. The actors are said to be speaking in four dialects, and there's nothing about the film, other than the ill-conceived couple (Mandy Patinkin and Kathryn Grody) used as comic relief, to give away its American origin. Sayles has never been a visual stylist, and his latest film is as straightforward and plot-bound as any of the earlier ones." Andrew Johnston wrote in Time Out New York, "The title of John Sayles's latest film suggests a Tarentinoesque lark, but don't be fooled: There are no wise-cracking hit men to be found here. Men with Guns is a somber rumination on the nature of violence and the sometimes disastrous effects of good intentions. While not as epic as his last film, the masterful Lone Star, it's still another bold triumph for one of America's most independent-minded filmmakers."

The review aggregator Rotten Tomatoes reported that 89% of critics gave the film a positive review, based on twenty-seven reviews.

=== Awards ===
Wins

- Donostia-San Sebastián International Film Festival: FIPRESCI Prize, for expressing with sensitivity and efficiency one of the essential problems of our time; International Catholic Film Association (OCIC) Grand Prix Award; Solidarity Award; all for John Sayles, 1997.

Nominated

- Donostia-San Sebastián International Film Festival: Golden Seashell, John Sayles, 1997.
- British Independent Film Awards: Best Foreign Independent Film Award, Foreign Language, 1998.
- British Independent Film Awards: Best Foreign Language Film, 1998.
- Golden Globes: Best Foreign Language Film, 1999.
- Political Film Society, Peace Award, 1999.

== Soundtrack ==
An original motion picture soundtrack was released by Rykodisc on February 24, 1998. The CD contains twenty-three tracks (00:43:10), and includes songs heard in the film and the film score written by Mason Daring.

The music is universally Latin in flavor. The various styles include: cumbias, the Colombian dance music; a brass band; an orquestra, of Mayan culture; Peruvian Susana Baca singing a cappella; El General's funky hip-hop; and Mason Daring's bass marimba and Spanish guitar-driven score.
