= Here Media =

LGBT-oriented media company

Here Media Inc.
- Type: Private
- Founded: 2009
- Headquarters: Los Angeles, California, USA
- Key people: Stephen P. Jarchow (Chairman); Paul Colichman (Chief Executive Officer); Tony Shyngle (Chief Financial Officer)
- Products: Here TV
- Website: www.heremedia.com

Here Media Inc. is an LGBTQ-oriented media company. Headquartered in Los Angeles, the company produces and distributes niche content focused on LGBT consumers.

== History ==
Here Media was founded in 2009 by Paul Colichman and Stephen P. Jarchow when Here Networks LLC and Regent Entertainment Media Inc. formed a business combination with PlanetOut Inc.

The company was initially established by a different name in December 2000. At that time, Online Partners agreed to acquire PlanetOut Corp., creating PlanetOut Partners Inc. In 2002, privately held Here TV was launched and made available in 50 million homes. On October 14, 2004, PlanetOut joined NASDAQ under the ticker symbol (LGBT). In November 2005, PlanetOut acquired LPI Media, publisher of The Advocate, OUT, HIV Plus, and Alyson Books. In 2008, Regent Entertainment Media Inc. (now known as Here Publishing Inc. and currently a subsidiary of Here Media Inc.) bought rights to The Advocate, OUT, HIV Plus, and Alyson Books.

In 2017, Here Media sold its publishing operations to Oreva Capital. Here Publishing was rebranded as Pride Media Inc. after the acquisition.

=== Here TV ===
Here TV is an American premium television network targeting LGBT audiences. The company was launched in 2002, and is available nationwide on all major cable systems, fiber optics systems, and Internet TV providers as either a 24/7 premium subscription channel, a video on demand (VOD) service, and/or a subscription video on demand (SVOD) service.

== Accolades ==
Here TV Awards:

- 2009: Daytime Emmy Award Nominee—The Ribbon of Hope Celebration
- 2012: Daytime Emmy Award Nominee—30 Years From Here
