= Paul Colichman =

American media entrepreneur

- Born: 1962 (age 63–64); United States
- Occupation: Media entrepreneur

Paul Colichman (born 1962) is an American media entrepreneur who founded the gay cable channel Here!. In 2008, John Waters nicknamed Colichman "the gay Citizen Hearst." He is the CEO of Here Media, Inc. and has produced and/or distributed over 200 motion pictures and television series episodes, most notably Academy-award winning film Gods and Monsters, starring Ian McKellen, Brendan Fraser and Lynn Redgrave.

== Business ventures ==
Colichman is Chief Executive Officer of Here Media, Inc. Colichman is best known for producing the Academy Award winning film Gods and Monsters. With his longtime business partner Stephen P. Jarchow, Colichman has produced and/or distributed over 200 motion pictures and television series episodes. Colichman received a B.A and M.B.A. from the University of California, Los Angeles, where he was University film commissioner and on the Board of Directors of ASUCLA As an undergraduate, Colichman was the associate producer for one of the first-ever benefit concerts for AIDS, which featured Debbie Reynolds at the Hollywood Bowl in Los Angeles, California. Colichman landed his first job producing a charity event for Miles Copeland, which benefitted the AMC Cancer Research Center.

After graduating, Colichman worked at Fox, where at the age of 24 he was head of late night programming and created the Joan Rivers Show, before partnering with Miles Copeland III in the film company I.R.S. Media.

In 1995, Peter Dekom introduced Colichman to Stephen P. Jarchow, a tax and real estate lawyer. Their shared business vision led them to form Regent Entertainment.

In 2008, Colichman and Jarchow acquired The Advocate and OUT Magazine.

In 2009, Here Networks LLC along with its publishing subsidiaries, and PlanetOut were combined to form Here Media, Inc. and Colichman was appointed CEO.

== Awards ==
Gods and Monsters received three Academy Award nominations (winning for Best Adapted Screenplay), four Golden Globe nominations (winning for Best Supporting Actress), three Independent Spirit Awards, and the National Board of Review's Best Picture honor. Twilight of the Golds, produced by Colichman, won two Cable Ace Awards. Colichman also executive produced the Academy Award nominated film Tom and Viv, which starred Willem Dafoe, Miranda Richardson, and Rosemary Harris. Mr. Colichman's Regent Releasing distributed the motion picture Departures, which received the 2008 Best Foreign Language Film Academy Award.

- Academy Award Winner, Best Adapted Screenplay (1999) – Producer, Gods and Monsters
- Academy Award Winner, Best Foreign Language Film (2008) – Producer, Departures
- UCLA Anderson's 100 most Inspirational Alumni
- GLAAD Media Awards – under Colichman's ownership, Here Media Inc. titles have won 5 GLAAD Media Awards (The Advocate (3), Out (2))
- Power Up Premiere Award (2004) – Here TV
- Broadcast Film Critics Association Award (2009) – Departures
- Rainbow Key Award (2009) – Lesbian and Gay Advisory Board, City of West Hollywood
- Barbara Gittings Award (GLAAD Media Award, 2006)
- Stonewall Democratic Club, Sheldon Anderson Award (2009)
- Telly Award (2006): Here Networks – "Love and Sex: West Hollywood, CA"
- Independent Spirit Award (1999): Gods and Monsters – Producer
- Independent Spirit Award (1999): Gods and Monsters – Best Feature
- Ribbon of Hope Award (2007): Here Focus on HIV/AIDS
- GLAAD Media Award (2009): Outstanding Film, Limited Release: Shelter

== Nominations ==
- Daytime Emmy Awards (2012) – Executive Producer – Outstanding Special Class Special: "30 Years from Here"
- Daytime Emmy Awards (2009) – Executive Producer – Outstanding Special Class Special: "11th Annual Ribbon of Hope Celebration"
- CableACE Awards (1993) – Music Special: Sting at the Hollywood Bowl (1991)
- PGA Awards (1999) – Outstanding Producer of Theatrical Motion Pictures: Gods and Monsters
- Golden Satellite Awards (1999) – Best Motion Picture – Drama: Gods and Monsters

== Select filmography ==
Year	Title	Credits
2012	For & Against (TV Series)	Executive Producer - 8 episodes
2011	30 Years from Here (TV Movie documentary)	Executive Producer
2011	Just Josh! (TV Series)	Executive Producer - 3 episodes
2008	Little Ashes	Executive Producer
2007-2008	The Lair (TV Series)	Executive Producer - 28 episodes
2007	Shelter	Producer
2007	Ice Spiders (TV Movie)	Executive Producer
2006	John Waters Presents Movies That Will Corrupt You (TV Series)	Producer - 13 episodes
2005	Margaret Cho: Assassin (Documentary)	Executive Producer
2004-2007	Dante's Cove (TV Series)	Executive Producer - 12 episodes
1998	Gods and Monsters	Producer
1992	One False Move	Executive Producer
1991	Shakes the Clown	Producer
1988	The Decline of Western Civilization Part II: The Metal Years (Documentary)	Executive Producer

== See also ==
- PlanetOut Inc.
