= The Other Conquest =

1999 Mexican film by Salvador Carrasco

The Other Conquest (La Otra Conquista)
- Directed by: Salvador Carrasco
- Written by: Salvador Carrasco
- Produced by: Alvaro Domingo
- Starring: José Carlos Rodríguez; Elpidia Carrillo; Iñaki Aierra; Honorato Magaloni; Damián Delgado
- Cinematography: Arturo de la Rosa
- Edited by: Salvador Carrasco
- Music by: Samuel Zyman; Jorge Reyes
- Production companies: Carrasco & Domingo Films; Secretaria de Desarrollo Social; Secretariat of Culture; FONCA; Tabasco Films; IMCINE
- Distributed by: Twentieth Century Fox
- Release date: 1999
- Running time: 105 minutes
- Country: Mexico
- Languages: Spanish; Nahuatl
- Box office: $2.8 million (Mexico/United States)

The Other Conquest (Spanish: La Otra Conquista) is a 1999 Mexican historical drama film written and directed by Salvador Carrasco, produced by Alvaro Domingo, and executive produced by Plácido Domingo. The film is set during the aftermath of the 1520s Spanish Conquest of the Aztec Empire, viewed primarily from the perspective of the Aztecs. The plot begins after the Massacre in the Great Temple in Tenochtitlan, and follows a lone Aztec scribe named Topiltzin [toˈpiɬt͡sin], who is captured by Hernan Cortés and placed in the care of a friar.

Samuel Zyman's score was recorded by the Academy of Saint Martin in the Fields, conducted by David Snell and performed by Plácido Domingo. Released by Twentieth Century Fox in 1999, the film received positive reviews and was a Mexican box office success. The film was rereleased in the United States in 2007.

== Plot ==
Topilzin, a scribe and the illegitimate son of Montezuma, finds himself at odds with the new Spanish rule. Refusing the new Christian religion and assaulting a friar, Topilzin is handed over to the army by his brother and brought to Hernán Cortés and his lover, Tecuichpo. Topilzin's life is spared and he is flogged in public, receiving a spiritual revelation. Topilzin abandons his life as a scribe to become a monk, joining an order led by friar Diego.

== Cast ==
- Damián Delgado as Topiltzin / Tomás
- José Carlos Rodríguez as Fray Diego de La Coruña
- Elpidia Carrillo as Tecuichpo / Doña Isabel
- Iñaki Aierra as Hernando Cortés
- Honorato Magaloni as Capitán Cristóbal Quijano
- Guillermo Ríos as Alanpoyatzin - brother
- Diana Bracho as Doña Juana
- Carlos Torres Torrija as Soldier Héctor (credited as Carlos Torrestorija)

== Reception ==
=== Box office ===
Distributed by Twentieth Century Fox, the film was released in Mexico in 1999 by Twentieth Century Fox, "enjoying the biggest opening weekend of any Mexican film in history on its home turf". In a 60-print release, it grossed nearly $2 million in Mexico and was one of the top five films in the country in the past 12 months. The film performed well in the United States for a foreign language film. It opened on 74 screens in Los Angeles and grossed nearly $400,000 in its first five days. It went on to gross $894,410 in the United States, including its 2007 rerelease.

=== Critical response ===
Rotten Tomatoes gives a score of 85% based on 13 reviews. The film's song-cycle Solamente Sola was descibred as "couched in effusive and seductive folk styles... a hauntingly evocative cycle on poems by Salvador Carrasco".
