= Central Station (film) =

1998 film by Walter Salles

- Theatrical release poster
- Portuguese: Central do Brasil
- Directed by: Walter Salles
- Screenplay by: João Emanuel Carneiro; Marcos Bernstein
- Story by: Walter Salles
- Produced by: Arthur Cohn; Martine de Clermont-Tonnerre
- Starring: Fernanda Montenegro; Marília Pêra; Vinícius de Oliveira
- Cinematography: Walter Carvalho
- Edited by: Isabelle Rathery; Felipe Lacerda
- Music by: Antônio Pinto; Jaques Morelenbaum
- Production companies: VideoFilmes; Riofilme; MACT Productions; E.S.R. Films L.T.D.; Cinematográfica Superfilmes
- Distributed by: Riofilme (Brazil); Mars Distribution (France)
- Release dates: 16 January 1998 (Switzerland); 3 April 1998 (Brazil); 2 December 1998 (France)
- Running time: 113 minutes
- Countries: Brazil; France
- Language: Portuguese
- Budget: $2.9 million
- Box office: $22 million

Central Station (Portuguese: Central do Brasil) is a 1998 road drama film directed by Walter Salles from a screenplay by João Emanuel Carneiro and Marcos Bernstein, based on an original idea by Salles. It stars Fernanda Montenegro, Marília Pêra and Vinícius de Oliveira. The film tells the story of a young boy's friendship with a jaded middle-aged woman.

Central Station premiered in Switzerland on 16 January 1998, in Brazil on 3 April, and in France on 2 December. The film received critical acclaim, with Montenegro's performance earning her a nomination for the Academy Award for Best Actress and the Golden Globe Award for Best Actress in a Motion Picture – Drama (becoming the first Brazilian actor to ever be nominated in the lead actress category on both awards), while the film was nominated for the Academy Award for Best Foreign Language Film and won the Golden Globe for Best Foreign Language Film, the BAFTA Award for Best Film Not in the English Language, and the Golden Bear at the 48th Berlin International Film Festival.

In 2015, the Brazilian Film Critics Association aka Abraccine voted Central Station the 11th greatest Brazilian film of all time, in its list of the 100 best Brazilian films.

== Plot ==
Dora is a retired schoolteacher who works at Rio de Janeiro's Central Station, writing letters for illiterate customers to earn a living. Embittered by life, she often demonstrates a lack of patience and sometimes does not mail the letters, stashing them in a drawer or even tearing them up instead. Ana, one of her customers, expresses her desire to reunite with her husband Jesus and have their 9-year-old son Josué finally meet him. When she is killed in an accident just outside the station, Dora feels compelled to take Josué in. She trafficks him to a corrupt couple but later steals him back out of guilt.

Dora eventually decides to accompany Josué on a trip to northeastern Brazil in search of his father. Still reluctant, she tries to leave him on the bus, but he hops off, leaving behind his backpack containing Dora's money. They are picked up by a good-natured, evangelical truck driver, who abandons them when Dora encourages him to drink beer and makes a move on him. Dora trades her watch for a ride to Bom Jesus do Norte, but when they reach Jesus's address, the current residents inform them that he has moved to the new town. Penniless, the two are saved from destitution when Josué suggests that Dora write letters for visitors arriving in Bom Jesus for a massive pilgrimage.

Dora and Josué take the bus to the new town, only to be told that Jesus has long disappeared. Dora convinces Josué to live with her instead and asks her friend Irene to sell her household items in Rio, planning to settle somewhere else. They later run into Isaías, who has learned of the two's search for his father and insists that they come to the family house and meet his brother Moisés. They accept, though both hide their true identities. Isaías explains that Jesus married Ana after their mother died, and that nine years ago, while pregnant, Ana left him for Rio and never returned. Isaías asks Dora to read a letter that his father wrote to Ana when he disappeared, six months ago, in case she returned. In the letter, Jesus explains that he has gone to Rio to find Ana. He promises to return, asks her to wait for him, and says they can all be together. Josué and Isaías, who has by then deduced Josué's identity, are sure their father will return, while Moisés doubts it.

The next morning, while the boys are asleep, Dora sneaks out to catch the first bus to Rio, leaving behind the letter from Ana she carried with her but never mailed. Josué wakes up too late to prevent her departure. Dora drafts a letter to Josué on the bus, assuring him that he will have a better life with his half-brothers. Both look at the photos they had taken to remember one another and smile.

== Cast ==
- Fernanda Montenegro as Isadora "Dora" Teixeira
- Vinícius de Oliveira as Josué Fontenele de Paiva
- Marília Pêra as Irene
- Soia Lira as Ana Fontenele
- Othon Bastos as César
- Otávio Augusto as Pedrão
- Stela Freitas as Yolanda
- Matheus Nachtergaele as Isaías Paiva
- Caio Junqueira as Moisés Paiva

== Production ==
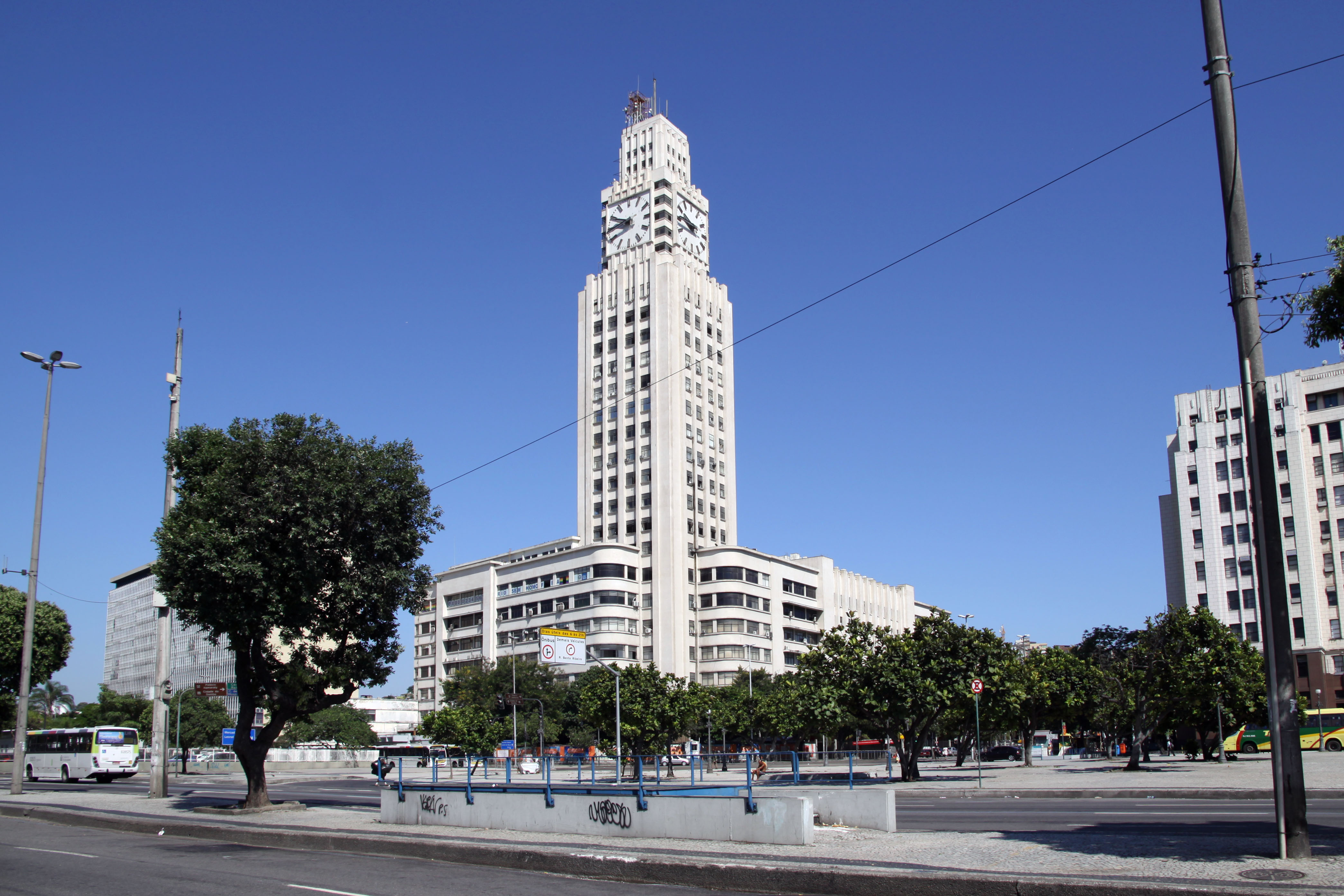
Estação Central do Brasil, a major railway station in Rio de Janeiro, served as the setting of the eponymous film.

Being a co-production between Brazil and France, the film was chosen by the French Ministry of Culture to receive resources of Fonds Sud Cinema, for their funding. Cruzeiro do Nordeste, a district of Sertânia, Pernambuco, stood in for the fictional town of Bom Jesus do Norte.

== Release ==
Central Station had its world premiere at a regional film festival in Switzerland on 16 January 1998. It was then screened at the Sundance Film Festival on 19 January 1998 and at the 48th Berlin International Film Festival on 14 February 1998. Shortly after its Sundance premiere, Miramax Films acquired distribution rights to the film in the U.K., Ireland, Australia, New Zealand, Scandinavia, the Netherlands, Central and South America (except Brazil), Africa, Eastern Europe, Greece and the Middle East for $1.2 million. Miramax reportedly bid higher for a worldwide rights deal; this deal would not go through, making way for Sony Pictures Classics to acquire U.S. distribution rights for $500,000 prior to the Sundance premiere. The film was released in Brazil on 3 April 1998 in 36 theaters.

== Reception ==
=== Box office ===
The film grossed R$7.7 million (US$4.3 million) from 1.6 million admissions in Brazil, the highest-grossing Brazilian film released during the year.

It was the highest-grossing Brazilian film in the United States with a gross of $6.5 million, surpassing the $3 million earned by the 1976 film Dona Flor and Her Two Husbands. It was surpassed by the 2002 film City of God which grossed $7.5 million. It grossed US$11.7 million in the rest of the world for a worldwide total of US$22,462,500.

=== Critical response ===
The film received critical acclaim. Central Station has an approval rating of 94% on review aggregator website Rotten Tomatoes, based on 50 reviews, and an average rating of 7.9/10. The website's critical consensus states: "Director Salles transcends road-movie clichés and crafts a film that is as moving as it is universal". Metacritic assigned the film a weighted average score of 80 out of 100, based on 24 critics, indicating generally favorable reviews.

The film was a New York Times Critics' Pick: according to Janet Maslin, "Mr. Salles directs simply and watchfully, with an eye that seems to penetrate all the characters"; the film features a "bravura performance by the Brazilian actress Fernanda Montenegro." According to Richard Schickel, the film is "an odyssey of simple problems, simple emotional discoveries, [and] a relationship full of knots that Salles permits to unwind in an unforced, unsentimental fashion. His imagery, like his storytelling, is clear, often unaffectedly lovely, and quietly, powerfully haunting. Entertainment Weekly gave the film a grade of A–, concluding "In outline, Central Station recalls many of the bogusly sticky adult–kid bonding tales that have been the bane of foreign cinema for too long, but Salles, like De Sica and Renoir, displays a pure and unpatronizing feel for the poetry of broken lives. His movie is really about that most everyday of miracles: the rebirth of hope."

The film is ranked No. 57 in Empire magazine's "The 100 Best Films of World Cinema" in 2010.

=== Accolades ===
Year	Awards	Category	Nominee(s)	Result
1999	71st Academy Awards	Best Actress	Fernanda Montenegro	Nominated
1999	71st Academy Awards	Best Foreign Language Film	Brazil	Nominated
1999	56th Golden Globe Awards	Best Actress in a Motion Picture – Drama	Fernanda Montenegro	Nominated
1999	56th Golden Globe Awards	Best Foreign Language Film	Central Station	Won
1999	14th Independent Spirit Awards	Best Foreign Language Film	Central Station	Nominated
1999	52nd British Academy Film Awards	Best Film Not in the English Language	Central Station	Won
1999	24th César Awards	Best Foreign Film	Central Station	Nominated
1999	São Paulo Association of Art Critics	Best Film	Central Station	Won
1999	São Paulo Association of Art Critics	Best Director	Walter Salles	Won
1999	São Paulo Association of Art Critics	Best Actress	Fernanda Montenegro	Won
1998	Golden Satellite Awards	Best Foreign Language Film	Central Station	Won
1998	Golden Satellite Awards	Best Actress in a Motion Picture Drama	Fernanda Montenegro	Nominated
1998	Golden Satellite Awards	Best Original Screenplay	João Emanuel Carneiro and Marcos Bernstein	Nominated
1998	48th Berlin International Film Festival	Golden Bear	Central Station	Won
1998	48th Berlin International Film Festival	Silver Bear for Best Actress	Fernanda Montenegro	Won
1998	National Board of Review	Best Actress	Fernanda Montenegro	Won
1998	National Board of Review	Best Foreign Language Film	Central Station	Won
1998	Los Angeles Film Critics Association	Best Actress	Fernanda Montenegro	Won
1998	New York Film Critics Circle	Best Actress	Fernanda Montenegro	2nd Place
1998	Havana Film Festival	Best Film	Central Station	Won
1998	Havana Film Festival	Best Actress	Fernanda Montenegro	Won
1998	Association of Film Critics Spain	Best Foreign Language Film	Central Station	Won
1998	Association of Film Critics in Poland	Best Foreign Language Film	Central Station	Won
1998	National Association of Italian Critic	Best Foreign Language Film	Central Station	Won
1998	Sundance Film Festival	Best Screenplay	João Emanuel Carneiro and Marcos Bernstein	Won
1998	San Sebastián International Film Festival	Audience Award	Central Station	Won
1998	Association of Film Critics of Rio de Janeiro	Film of the Year	Central Station	Won

== See also ==
- List of submissions to the 71st Academy Awards for Best Foreign Language Film
- List of Brazilian submissions for the Academy Award for Best Foreign Language Film
