= The Opposite of Sex =

- Theatrical release poster
- Directed by: Don Roos
- Written by: Don Roos
- Produced by: David Kirkpatrick; Michael Besman
- Starring: Christina Ricci; Martin Donovan; Lisa Kudrow; Lyle Lovett; Johnny Galecki; Ivan Sergei
- Cinematography: Hubert Taczanowski
- Edited by: David Codron
- Music by: Mason Daring
- Production company: Rysher Entertainment
- Distributed by: Sony Pictures Classics
- Release dates: January 1998 (Sundance); May 22, 1998 (U.S.)
- Running time: 101 minutes
- Country: United States
- Language: English
- Budget: $5 million
- Box office: $6.4 million

The Opposite Of Sex is a 1998 American independent romantic dark comedy film written and directed by Don Roos, in his directorial debut, starring Christina Ricci, Martin Donovan and Lisa Kudrow. It marked the final film produced by Rysher Entertainment. Shortly before the film's world premiere at the 1998 Sundance Film Festival, it was acquired by Sony Pictures Classics.

== Plot ==
Sixteen-year-old Dedee Truitt runs away from home. She is pregnant by her ex-boyfriend, Randy Cates. Not revealing her pregnancy, Dedee eventually moves in with her much older half-brother Bill, a gay teacher in a conservative, suburban community in St. Joseph County, Indiana.

Although he is living with Matt, Bill still mourns the loss of his previous partner, Tom, who died of AIDS some time ago. Bill maintains a friendship with Tom's younger sister, Lucia, who idolized her brother.

Dedee seduces Matt, then tricks him into believing he has impregnated her. They elope, leaving Bill and Lucia to track them down.

Bill and Lucia find Dedee and Matt in Los Angeles, only to discover Dedee has stolen Tom's ashes and is holding them for ransom. Randy also finds her; they inform Matt that they are taking the ashes and moving away. They escape but soon get into an argument that leads to Dedee's accidentally shooting Randy. She and Matt escape to Canada.

Lucia and Bill have a falling out after she implies that Tom died as a result of having gay sex. Despondent, she has a one-night stand with Sheriff Carl Tippett, who had previously made unsuccessful romantic overtures to her. Lucia later discovers that she is pregnant.

Bill eventually tracks down Matt and Dedee. She goes into labor and Bill accompanies her into the delivery room. After giving birth to her son, Dedee returns Tom's ashes to him, apologizing for her actions in the past year.

Dedee ends up serving time in prison, leaving her son in Bill's care while she's incarcerated. After a few months, she moves back in with him, while Matt goes traveling, and Lucia gives birth to her own child. Eventually, Dedee decides that her son would be better off with Bill, who is now dating Dedee's parole officer.

Dedee sarcastically concludes that sex is precisely the opposite of what people should want, leading as it does to kids, disease or, worst of all, relationships. At the end of the film, the vignettes of the various caring relationships among the characters show the opposite of superficial sexual gratification.

== Cast ==
- Christina Ricci as Dedee Truitt
- Martin Donovan as Bill Truitt
- Lisa Kudrow as Lucia De Lury
- Lyle Lovett as Carl Tippett
- Johnny Galecki as Jason Bock
- William Lee Scott as Randy Cates
- Ivan Sergei as Matt Mateo
- Colin Ferguson as Tom De Lury
- Megan Blake as Bobette
- Dan Bucatinsky as Timothy
- Chauncey Leopardi as Joe
- Rodney Eastman as Ty
- Heather Fairfield as Jennifer Oakes
- Leslie Grossman as Girl Student

== Production ==
The Opposite of Sex was shot from June to July 1997 in Los Angeles, California. It was to be the last theatrical work produced by Rysher Entertainment, who shut down their film unit the same month that shooting wrapped. Sony's arthouse division Sony Pictures Classics distributed the film.

== Reception ==
=== Box office ===
The Opposite of Sex was given a limited theatrical release on May 22, 1998. Its opening weekend saw a per-screen average of $20,477 for the five theaters showing it.

=== Critical response ===
Janet Maslin in The New York Times called it a "gleefully acerbic comedy". Christina Ricci's performance was widely praised and she received a nomination for the Golden Globe Award for Best Actress – Motion Picture Comedy or Musical. Roger Ebert especially enjoyed the voice-over narration supplied in-character by Ricci, calling it "refreshing" and comparing it to Mystery Science Theater 3000:

When you've seen enough movies, alas, you can sense the gears laboriously turning, and you know with a sinking heart that there will be no surprises. The Dede character subverts those expectations; she shoots the legs out from under the movie with perfectly timed zingers. I hate people who talk during movies, but if she were sitting behind me in the theater, saying all of this stuff, I'd want her to keep right on talking.

On Rotten Tomatoes, the film has an 81% approval rating based on 42 reviews, with an average rating of 7/10. The site's critics consensus reads: "The Opposite of Sex smartly lightens a bitter story with sharp insights and strong dialogue - as well as a startlingly mature performance from former child actor Christina Ricci." On Metacritic, the film has a weighted average score of 70 out of 100, based on reviews from 26 critics, indicating "generally favourable reviews".

Director Don Roos has been noted for his depiction of sexual fluidity, which features in The Opposite of Sex as well as other Roos films such as Happy Endings. Judith Kegan Gardiner took a less sanguine view of this feature in the book Masculinity Studies and Feminist Theory. Gardiner described The Opposite of Sex as representative of a "fairly repulsive genre of films" that feature a "heterosexual conversion narrative" that is "set in motion by the desire of a heterosexual person for a seemingly unattainable gay person."

The American Film Institute nominated the film for its AFI's 100 Years...100 Laughs list.
