= Marc Norman =

American screenwriter, novelist, and playwright (born 1941)

Marc Norman (born February 10, 1941) is an American screenwriter, novelist, and playwright. He is best known as the co-writer and co-producer of Shakespeare in Love (1998), for which he won the Academy Award for Best Original Screenplay with Tom Stoppard and shared the Academy Award for Best Picture as a producer.

== Early life and education ==
Norman was born in Los Angeles, California. He attended public schools in Los Angeles before enrolling at the University of California, Berkeley, where he earned a Master of Arts in English literature in 1964.

== Career ==
Norman began his career in the film industry at Universal Studios in the mid-1960s, initially working in the studio mailroom. He later became an in-house writer for producer Leonard Stern on the television series Get Smart. During the late 1960s, Norman wrote television films and episodes, including The Challenge (1969), one of the early ABC Movie of the Week productions, and an episode of Mission: Impossible.

He transitioned to feature films in the early 1970s with Oklahoma Crude (1973), directed by Stanley Kramer. Additional screenwriting credits include Zandy’s Bride (1974), The Killer Elite (1976), Breakout (1975), and The Aviator (1985), based on the novel by Ernest Gann. In 1995, he was among the writers hired to revise the screenplay for Cutthroat Island.

In 1998, Shakespeare in Love, directed by John Madden, was released. The film received multiple honors, including Academy Awards for Best Original Screenplay and Best Picture.

== Books ==
Norman has published works of fiction and nonfiction, including the novels Bike Riding in Los Angeles, Oklahoma Crude, and Fool’s Errand, as well as What Happens Next?: A History of Hollywood Screenwriting (2007).

== Personal life ==
Norman married Dale Jean Moore in 1967. They have two children.
