= List of awards and nominations received by Lisa Kudrow =

Lisa Kudrow awards and nominations
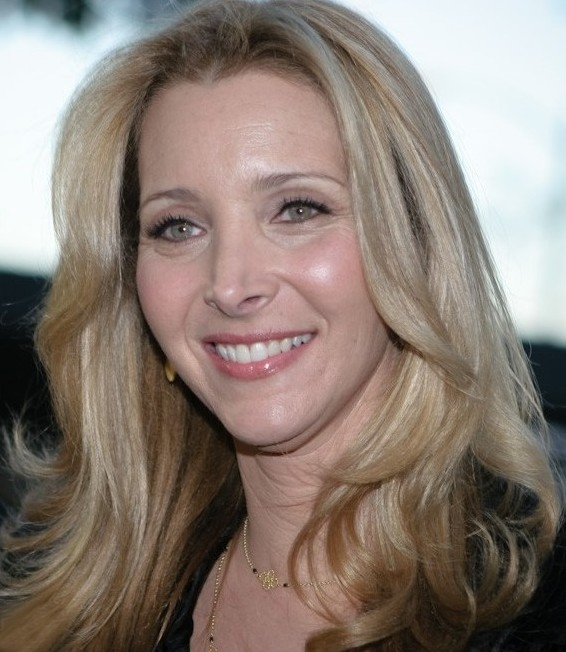
- Kudrow at the 1st Streamy Awards in 2009
Awards and nominations
Award	Wins	Nominations
American Comedy Awards	1	8
Golden Globe Awards	0	1
MTV Movie & TV Awards	0	1
Emmy Awards	1	19
Satellite Awards	1	5
Screen Actors Guild Awards	2	12
Teen Choice Awards	1	3

Totals (Note: Certain award groups do not simply award one winner. They acknowledge several different recipients, have runners-up, and have third place. Since this is a specific recognition and is different from losing an award, runner-up mentions are considered wins in this award tally. For simplification and to avoid errors, each award in this list has been presumed to have had a prior nomination.)
- Wins: 19
- Nominations: 98

American actress Lisa Kudrow has been honored with numerous accolades over her career. For her role in the sitcom Friends, she received six nominations at the Primetime Emmy Awards, winning in 1998 for Outstanding Supporting Actress in a Comedy Series, she won two Screen Actors Guild Awards, one Satellite Award, one American Comedy award and one TV Guide award.

== Major associations ==
=== Emmy Awards ===
==== Primetime Emmy Awards ====
The Primetime Emmy Award is an American award bestowed by the Academy of Television Arts & Sciences (ATAS) in recognition of excellence in American primetime television programming. Kudrow has received one award from sixteen nominations.

Year	Category	Nominated work	Result	Ref.
1995	Outstanding Supporting Actress in a Comedy Series	Friends	Nominated	
1997	Outstanding Supporting Actress in a Comedy Series	Friends	Nominated	
1998	Outstanding Supporting Actress in a Comedy Series	Friends	Won	
1999	Outstanding Supporting Actress in a Comedy Series	Friends	Nominated	
2000	Outstanding Supporting Actress in a Comedy Series	Friends	Nominated	
2001	Outstanding Supporting Actress in a Comedy Series	Friends	Nominated	
2006	Outstanding Lead Actress in a Comedy Series	The Comeback	Nominated	
2012	Outstanding Short Form Series (Note: Nominated as producer)	Web Therapy	Nominated	
2012	Outstanding Reality Program	Who Do You Think You Are?	Nominated	
2014	Outstanding Structured Reality Program	Who Do You Think You Are?	Nominated	
2015	Outstanding Lead Actress in a Comedy Series	The Comeback	Nominated	
2017	Outstanding Structured Reality Program	Who Do You Think You Are?	Nominated	
2018	Outstanding Structured Reality Program	Who Do You Think You Are?	Nominated	
2019	Outstanding Structured Reality Program	Who Do You Think You Are?	Nominated	
2021	Outstanding Variety Special (Pre-Recorded)	Friends: The Reunion	Nominated	
2026	Outstanding Lead Actress in a Comedy Series	The Comeback	Nominated	
2026	Outstanding Writing for a Comedy Series	The Comeback	Nominated	

==== Children's and Family Emmy Awards ====
The Children's and Family Emmy Awards are bestowed by the National Academy of Television Arts and Sciences in recognition of excellence in American children's and family-oriented television programming. Kudrow has received two nominations.

Year	Category	Nominated work	Result	Ref.
2022	Outstanding Supporting Performance	Better Nate Than Ever	Nominated	
2025	Outstanding Lead Performance	Time Bandits	Nominated	

=== Golden Globe Awards ===
The Golden Globe Awards are accolades bestowed by the 93 members of the Hollywood Foreign Press Association beginning in January 1944, recognizing excellence in film and television, both domestic and foreign. Kudrow has received one nomination.

Year	Category	Nominated work	Result	Ref.
1996	Best Supporting Actress – Series, Miniseries or Television Film	Friends	Nominated	

=== Screen Actors Guild Awards ===
The Screen Actors Guild Awards are accolades given by the Screen Actors Guild‐American Federation of Television and Radio Artists to recognize outstanding performances in film and prime time television. Kudrow has received two awards from twelve nominations.

Year	Category	Nominated work	Result	Ref.
1994	Outstanding Ensemble in a Comedy Series	Mad About You	Nominated (Note: Shared with the cast.)	
1995	Outstanding Ensemble in a Comedy Series	Friends	Won	
1995	Outstanding Female Actor in a Comedy Series	Friends	Nominated	
1998	Outstanding Female Actor in a Comedy Series	Friends	Nominated	
1998	Outstanding Ensemble in a Comedy Series	Friends	Nominated	
1999	Outstanding Female Actor in a Comedy Series	Friends	Won	
1999	Outstanding Ensemble in a Comedy Series	Friends	Nominated	
2000	Outstanding Ensemble in a Comedy Series	Friends	Nominated	
2001	Outstanding Ensemble in a Comedy Series	Friends	Nominated	
2002	Outstanding Ensemble in a Comedy Series	Friends	Nominated	
2003	Outstanding Ensemble in a Comedy Series	Friends	Nominated	
2003	Outstanding Female Actor in a Comedy Series	Friends	Nominated	

== Other awards ==
=== American Comedy Awards ===
The American Comedy Awards are a group of awards presented annually in the United States recognizing performances and performers in the field of comedy, with an emphasis on television comedy and comedy films. Kudrow has received one award from eight nominations.

Year	Category	Nominated work	Result	Ref.
1996	Funniest Supporting Female Performer in a TV Series	Friends	Nominated	
1999	Funniest Supporting Actress in a Motion Picture	The Opposite of Sex	Nominated	
1999	Funniest Supporting Female Performer in a TV Series	Friends	Nominated	
1999	Funniest Female Guest Appearance in a TV Series	Mad About You	Nominated	
2000	Funniest Supporting Actress in a Motion Picture	Analyze This	Nominated	
2000	Funniest Supporting Female Performer in a TV Series	Friends	Won	
2000	Funniest Female Performer in a TV Special – Network, Cable or Syndication	1999 MTV Movie Awards	Nominated	
2001	Funniest Supporting Female Performer in a TV Series	Friends	Nominated	

=== Banff Rockie Awards ===
The Banff World Media Festival is an international media event held in the Canadian Rockies at the Fairmont Banff Springs Hotel in Banff, Alberta, Canada. The festival is dedicated to world television and digital content and its creation and development. The festival features an international program competition, the Banff Rockie Awards, which are broadcast on CBC. Kudrow has received one award.

Year	Category	Nominated work	Result	Ref.
2011	Award of Excellence in Digital Media	Web Therapy	Won	

=== Blockbuster Entertainment Awards ===
The Blockbuster Entertainment Awards were a film awards ceremony, founded by Blockbuster Inc., that ran from 1995 until 2001. Kudrow received one award.

Year	Category	Nominated work	Result	Ref.
2000	Favorite Supporting Actress – Comedy	Analyze This	Won	

=== Chicago Film Critics Association Awards ===
The Chicago Film Critics Association is an association of professional film critics, who work in print, broadcast and online media, based in Chicago, Illinois, United States. Kudrow has received one nomination.

Year	Category	Nominated work	Result	Ref.
1998	Best Supporting Actress	The Opposite of Sex	Nominated	

=== Chlotrudis Awards ===
The Chlotrudis Awards are American film awards given since 1995 by the Chlotrudis Society for Independent Film. They are considered among the most important awards of international independent cinema. Kudrow has received one award.

Year	Category	Nominated work	Result	Ref.
1999	Best Supporting Actress	The Opposite of Sex	Won	

=== Critics' Choice Television Awards ===
The Critics' Choice Television Awards are accolades that are presented annually by the Broadcast Television Journalists Association. Kudrow has received two nominations.

Year	Category	Nominated work	Result	Ref.
2015	Best Actress in a Comedy Series	The Comeback	Nominated	
2016	Best Guest Performer in a Comedy Series	Unbreakable Kimmy Schmidt	Nominated	

=== Dorian Awards ===
The Dorian Awards are an annual endeavor organized by GALECA: The Society of LGBTQ Entertainment Critics (founded in 2009 as the Gay and Lesbian Entertainment Critics Association). Kudrow has received one award.

Year	Category	Nominated work	Result	Ref.
2014	TV Performance of the Year – Actress	The Comeback	Won	

=== Golden Raspberry Awards ===
The Golden Raspberry Awards (also known as the Razzie Awards) is a mock award in recognition of the worst in film. Kudrow has received one nomination.

Year	Category	Nominated work	Result	Ref.
1997	Worst New Star (Note: Shared with Jennifer Aniston, Matt LeBlanc and David Schwimmer)	Mother	Nominated	

=== Gracie Awards ===
The Gracie Awards are awards presented by the Alliance for Women in Media Foundation in America, to celebrate and honor programming created for women, by women, and about women, as well as individuals who have made exemplary contributions in electronic media and affiliates. Kudrow has received one award.

Year	Category	Nominated work	Result	Ref.
2006	Outstanding Female Lead – Comedy Series	The Comeback	Won	

=== Independent Spirit Awards ===
The Independent Spirit Awards, founded in 1984, are awards dedicated to independent filmmakers. Kudrow has received one nomination.

Year	Category	Nominated work	Result	Ref.
1998	Best Supporting Female	The Opposite of Sex	Nominated	

=== MTV Movie and TV Awards ===
The MTV Movie & TV Awards (formerly known as the MTV Movie Awards) is a film and television awards show presented annually on MTV. Kudrow has received one nomination.

Year	Category	Nominated work	Result	Ref.
1998	Best Dance Sequence (Note: Shared with Mira Sorvino and Alan Cumming)	Romy and Michele's High School Reunion	Nominated	

=== National Society of Film Critics Awards ===
The National Society of Film Critics is an American film critic organization. The organization is known for its highbrow tastes, and its annual awards are one of the most prestigious film critics awards in the United States. Kudrow has received one nomination.

Year	Category	Nominated work	Result	Ref.
1998	Best Supporting Actress	The Opposite of Sex	Nominated	

=== New York Film Critics Circle Awards ===
The New York Film Critics Circle is an American film critic organization founded in 1935. Its membership includes over 30 film critics from New York-based daily and weekly newspapers, magazines, online publications. Kudrow has received one award.

Year	Category	Nominated work	Result	Ref.
1998	Best Supporting Actress	The Opposite of Sex	Won	

=== Nickelodeon Kids' Choice Awards ===
The Nickelodeon Kids' Choice Awards is an American 90-minute-long annual awards show that airs on Nickelodeon. Usually held on a Saturday day, morning, or night in late March or early April, the show that honors the year's biggest television, movie, and music acts as voted by Nickelodeon viewers. Kudrow has received one nomination.

Year	Category	Nominated work	Result	Ref.
2000	Favorite TV Friends (Note: Shared with Jennifer Aniston and Courteney Cox)	Friends	Nominated	

=== Online Film Critics Society Awards ===
The Online Film Critics Society is an international professional association of online film journalists, historians and scholars who publish their work on the World Wide Web. Kudrow has received one nomination.

Year	Category	Nominated work	Result	Ref.
1998	Best Supporting Actress	The Opposite of Sex	Nominated	

=== People Magazine Awards ===
The People Magazine Awards was a one-off American awards ceremony that aired on December 18, 2014. Kudrow received one award.

Year	Category	Nominated work	Result	Ref.
2014	TV Performance of the Year – Actress	The Comeback	Won	

=== Satellite Awards ===
The Satellite Awards are annual awards given by the International Press Academy that are commonly noted in entertainment industry journals and blogs. Kudrow has received one award from five nominations.

Year	Category	Nominated work	Result	Ref.
1998	Best Actress – Motion Picture Musical or Comedy	Romy and Michele's High School Reunion	Nominated	
2001	Best Actress – Television Series Musical or Comedy	Friends	Won	
2002	Best Actress – Television Series Musical or Comedy	Friends	Nominated	
2006	Best Actress – Television Series Musical or Comedy	The Comeback	Nominated	
2008	Best Actress – Motion Picture Musical or Comedy	Kabluey	Nominated	

=== Teen Choice Awards ===
The Teen Choice Awards is an annual awards show that airs on the Fox television network. The awards honor the year's biggest achievements in music, film, sports, television, fashion, and more, voted by viewers aged 13 to 19. Kudrow has received one award from three nominations.

Year	Category	Nominated work	Result	Ref.
1999	Choice Movie: Hissy Fit	The Opposite of Sex	Nominated	
2000	Choice Movie: Hissy Fit	Hanging Up	Won	
2002	Choice TV Actress: Comedy	Friends	Nominated	

=== The Stinkers Bad Movie Awards ===
The Stinkers Bad Movie Awards (formerly known as the Hastings Bad Cinema Society) was a Los Angeles-based group of film buffs and movie critics devoted to honoring the worst films of the year. Kudrow received four nominations.

Year	Category	Nominated work	Result	Ref.
2000	Worst On-Screen Group (Note: Shared with Diane Keaton and Meg Ryan)	Hanging Up	Nominated	
2003	Worst Actress	Marci X	Nominated	
2003	Worst On-Screen Couple (Note: Shared with Damon Wayans)	Marci X	Nominated	
2003	Worst Song	"Power in My Purse" (Marci X)	Nominated	

=== Streamy Awards ===
The Streamy Awards, often referred to as the Streamys, are presented annually by Dick Clark Productions and Tubefilter to recognize and honor excellence in online video, including directing, acting, producing and writing. Kudrow has received two nominations.

Year	Category	Nominated work	Result	Ref.
2009	Best Female Actor in a Comedy Web Series	Web Therapy	Nominated	
2010	Best Female Actor in a Comedy Web Series	Web Therapy	Nominated	

=== TV Guide Awards ===
The TV Guide Award was an annual award created by the editors of TV Guide magazine, as a readers poll to honor outstanding programs and performers in the American television industry. The awards were presented until 1964. The TV Guide Award was revived 1999–2001. Kudrow received one award from two nominations.

Year	Category	Nominated work	Result	Ref.
2000	Favorite Actress in a Comedy Series	Friends	Nominated	
2000	Editor's Choice	Friends	Won	

=== Viewers for Quality Television Awards ===
Viewers for Quality Television was an American nonprofit organization founded in 1984 to advocate network television series that members of the organization voted to be of the "highest quality". Kudrow received one nomination for their Q Award.

Year	Category	Nominated work	Result	Ref.
1996	Best Supporting Actress in a Quality Comedy Series	Friends	Nominated	

=== Webby Awards ===
A Webby Award is an award for excellence on the Internet presented annually by The International Academy of Digital Arts and Sciences, a judging body composed of over two thousands industry experts and technology innovators. Kudrow has received four awards from seven nominations.

Year	Category	Nominated work	Result	Ref.
2009	Outstanding Comedic Performance	Web Therapy	Won	
2009	Best Writing (Note: Nominated as writer)	Web Therapy	Nominated	
2010	Best Individual Performance	Web Therapy	Nominated	
2010	Best Comedy: Long Form or Series (Note: Nomintated as writer/producer)	Web Therapy	Won	
2010	Best Writing	Web Therapy	Nominated	
2011	Best Individual Performance	Web Therapy	Won	
2011	Best Comedy: Long Form or Series	Web Therapy	Won	
