= List of The Comeback episodes =

The Comeback is an American sitcom produced by HBO that stars actress Lisa Kudrow as sitcom actress Valerie Cherish in modern-day Los Angeles. It was created by Kudrow and Michael Patrick King, a former executive producer of Sex and the City. Kudrow and King are also screenwriters and executive producers of the series, with King also serving as the director of some episodes. The series premiered on HBO on June 5, 2005, and aired for a single, 13-episode season before being canceled. The series was revived nine years later and an eight-episode second season started airing on HBO on November 9, 2014.

A total of 29 episodes of The Comeback were aired, with the third and final season concluding on May 10, 2026.

== Series overview ==
Season	Episodes	Originally released	
Season	Episodes	First released	Last released
1	13	June 5, 2005	September 4, 2005
2	8	November 9, 2014	December 28, 2014
3	8	March 22, 2026	May 10, 2026

== Episodes ==
=== Season 1 (2005) ===
No. overall	No. in season	Title	Directed by	Written by	Original release date	U.S. viewers (millions)
1	1	"The Comeback"	Michael Patrick King	Michael Patrick King & Lisa Kudrow	June 5, 2005	1.51
Presented as raw unedited footage, veteran sitcom actress Valerie Cherish attempts to revive her TV career by allowing a camera crew, led by lead producer Jane, to trail her around the clock for a reality show called The Comeback, a prerequisite for being cast in the pilot of the new sitcom Room and Bored. Valerie introduces her flamboyant hairdresser Mickey, as well as her husband Mark, who is unfamiliar with show business. Valerie clashes with Room and Bored's two co-creators, Tom and Paulie G., who believe that Valerie and the camera crew are an overbearing presence on set. Following the first table read, Valerie discovers that Room and Bored is being retooled. She is dismayed to learn that her role has been significantly reduced, with her character being rewritten as the dowdy Aunt Sassy, the landlord to a group of roommates played by four young actors: Juna, Chris, Shayne and Jesse. Valerie expresses her concerns to show director James Burrows, who advises her to be trustful with the show's new direction. Two weeks later, Valerie learns that Room and Bored has been picked up by the network.
2	2	"Valerie Triumphs at the Upfronts"	Michael Patrick King	Michael Patrick King & Lisa Kudrow	June 12, 2005	N/A
Valerie, Mickey and the cast of Room and Bored prepare to travel to New York City for the network upfronts, where new shows are unveiled to the media. Elsewhere, Valerie tries to manage her teenage stepdaughter Francesca's eating disorder, and she also begins to feel threatened by Juna, who is being established as Room and Bored's lead actress. In New York, Valerie feels unappreciated by the younger cast, who inadvertently go out for dinner without her. Valerie also tries to convince Paulie G. to write a skit for the cast at the upfronts presentation, but he rudely dismisses her. At the upfronts, Valerie has a brief meltdown backstage when she mistakenly believes she is not being introduced with the rest of the Room and Bored cast. Afterwards, Valerie is elated when an audience member repeats her Room and Bored catchphrase, and the cast happily invites her to take a group picture with them.
3	3	"Valerie Bonds with the Cast"	Michael Lehmann	Michael Patrick King	June 19, 2005	N/A
The cast of Room and Bored attend a table read for the show's first official episode. Paulie G. refuses to acknowledge Valerie when she tries to discuss Aunt Sassy's character development; James later warns Valerie about interjecting her own opinion, reminding her that The Comeback is her own show, not Room and Bored. Francesca appears eager to bond with Valerie in order to flaunt for the reality show cameras. Valerie walks into Tom and Paulie G.'s writing room and accidentally walks in on Paulie G. receiving a blowjob from another woman. Valerie attempts to further bond with her Room and Bored co-stars by inviting them for lunch, but is disconcerted when Juna does not appear. Juna attempts to make it up to Valerie by scheduling a one-on-one lunch, during which Juna admits that Room and Bored is her first acting gig. In response, Valerie offers to mentor Juna to help her navigate show business.
4	4	"Valerie Stands Up for Aunt Sassy"	Michael Lehmann	John Riggi	June 26, 2005	N/A
Valerie worries that audiences will turn against her character when Paulie G. writes a racist line for Aunt Sassy in the newest episode's script. James agrees that the line is offensive but advises her against confronting the writers, instead suggesting that she let the audience decide that the joke does not work. Valerie ignores James' advice and enlists Gigi, the show's only female writer, to help pitch a less offensive one. Stressed over how the audience will react, Valerie impulsively decides to adopt a puppy, to Mark's dismay. Gigi's suggestions are ultimately dismissed by the other writers and she is reprimanded for consulting with Valerie. When the line predictably fails to land with the audience, the writers create a new line that pokes fun at Aunt Sassy's age and appearance. Afterwards in the parking lot, Valerie apologizes to Paulie G. and proclaims that she is a team player, but he drives away. At Valerie's behest, Jane agrees to take the newly-adopted puppy for herself instead.
5	5	"Valerie Demands Dignity"	Greg Mottola	Linda Wallem	July 10, 2005	0.931
Mark is increasingly frustrated by the restraints the ubiquitous cameras have imposed on their sex life, and the camera crew inadvertently reveals a porno tape that Mark owns, which Valerie tries to prevent them from filming. After reading a tabloid magazine claiming that reality TV is dying, Valerie begins to worry that her comeback storyline isn't "enough" for audiences. The network tries to spice up Valerie's reality show by cross-breeding it with another reality show hosted by The Amazing Race contestant Charla Faddoul, who will act as Valerie's assistant for the day. While driving Valerie to an interview with a TV Guide editor, Charla purposely lets the car run out of gas, forcing Valerie to run across the highway; Valerie lambasts Charla and the camera crew for organizing the stunt. Valerie arrives late to her meeting with the TV Guide editor, who is impressed when Valerie emphasizes the importance of maintaining dignity in reality TV.
6	6	"Valerie Saves the Show"	Greg Mottola	Michael Schur	July 17, 2005	N/A
Room and Bored premieres on the network and receives a lackluster 3.5 in viewer ratings. Valerie tries to boost morale among the cast with a late-night cookie delivery, where she discovers the writers pantomiming a lewd act that depicts her in a compromising position. Mickey and the camera crew are visibly horrified, but Valerie brushes it off. Meanwhile, Juna tries to set up a date for Mickey with another man; Mickey is distraught at Juna's immediate assumption that he is gay. Upon discovering the incident with the writers, Shayne refuses to be filmed by Valerie's camera crew because The Comeback does not reflect Christian values, whereas she can overlook the sexual content of Room and Bored because she is acting; Valerie successfully persuades Shayne to see her reality show in a different light. Tom personally apologizes to Valerie for the writers' fiasco, to which she responds that she does not care as long as the writing is good. The following morning, Valerie learns that the next episode will revolve around Aunt Sassy getting a boyfriend.
7	7	"Valerie Gets a Special Episode"	Michael Lehmann	John Riggi	July 24, 2005	0.995
Excited about the upcoming Room and Bored episode dedicated to her character, Valerie wants to get a "name" actor to play Aunt Sassy's romantic interest and attempts to call Tom Selleck to appear on the show, although the writers do not believe that he will be interested. Mickey, forgetting about the crew's overhead cameras, tries to convince Valerie to cast his boyfriend Robert for the part. Juna invites Valerie and their other co-stars to her band's performance at The Viper Room; Valerie invites Mark, who gets drunk and grinds with another woman when Valerie refuses to dance with him in front of the cameras. Afterwards, Valerie and Mark argue over the incident, and Mark attempts to remove the bedroom's overhead cameras when he accidentally recalls an old story about doing cocaine with Valerie. The following morning, Tom regretfully informs Valerie that the show has been placed on hiatus for retooling, and that the Aunt Sassy episode will no longer be produced due to poor feedback from the network. Valerie receives a call from Selleck, who turns out to be interested in playing the role.
8	8	"Valerie Relaxes in Palm Springs"	Michael Lehmann	Linda Wallem and Michael Patrick King	July 31, 2005	N/A
While Room and Bored is on hiatus, Valerie and Mark head to Palm Springs to spend a long weekend at a resort, which doubles as a series of product placement attempts for The Comeback. Mark draws the line with Jane's crew on the golf course, while Valerie reunites with Donna, an old acquaintance who lives nearby; Donna confronts Valerie for acting in front of the camera crew and encourages her to express her true emotions. Later, Valerie is filmed being praised by a young gay couple, but one of the men refuses to be on-camera because he is closeted, rendering the footage unusable; Valerie manipulates the man into signing a release form by reiterating Donna's advice. Later, Valerie receives a call from Juna, who is asking if she is coming to Paulie G.'s party for the show's cast and crew. Realizing that she purposely did not get invited, Valerie gets drunk and leaves a voicemail for Paulie G., drunkenly revealing that she feels hurt by the fact that he did not invite her.
9	9	"Valerie Hangs With the Cool Kids"	J. Clark Mathis	Michael Schur	August 7, 2005	0.937
At the insistence of the network, Room and Bored gets a makeover, with Tom and Paulie G. hiring comedy duo Greg and Kaveen as two new cast members. Valerie comforts Chris and Jesse, who believe that their characters are being written out of the show. Meanwhile, Valerie tries to impress Francesca by getting her exclusive access to Juna's CD signing, but she ends up lambasting Francesca for smoking and drinking wine with her friends at the house. Juna, Chris, Shayne and Jesse inform Valerie that they intend to stay home from work as a protest; Valerie reluctantly agrees to join them. The following day, Valerie discovers that the four actors have decided to show up to work after consulting their agents and have forgotten to inform her. Valerie immediately rushes to the set, where Tom and Paulie G. confront her for skipping; Valerie is apologetic, but insists that the younger actors are unhappy with the show's new direction. Paulie G. is dismissive of Valerie's claims, but immediately after their meeting, Chris attacks Kaveen for insulting Valerie, forcing Tom and Paulie G. to intervene.
10	10	"Valerie Gets a Magazine Cover"	David Steinberg	Amy B. Harris	August 14, 2005	N/A
With Juna getting all the hype and most of the magazine covers, Valerie becomes determined to land a cover of her own and looks into hiring a publicist. After failing to get signed as a client by Juna's publicist, Valerie is signed by Billy Stanton, a second-rate publicist who is just starting his own agency. Billy scores Valerie a magazine shoot for Be Yoga magazine, although Valerie has no professional experience with yoga. Despite Mark's reservations, Valerie takes a yoga crash course with Mickey and Juna and orders an extensive remodel of her fitness room; Mark injures himself after tripping on an unattended moving treadmill and is given Percocet for the pain. At the cover shoot, the magazine representative threatens to pull the cover upon recognizing that Valerie is inexperienced with yoga. Valerie gets high on Mark's Percocet and successfully performs a tree pose, which is then revealed to have been chosen as the cover for the Be Yoga magazine.
11	11	"Valerie Stands Out on the Red Carpet"	Michael Patrick King	Michael Patrick King	August 21, 2005	N/A
Valerie discovers that Room and Bored has been nominated for Favorite New Comedy at the People's Choice Awards and announces the nomination to the cast; Tom reveals that they have not actually won the award, as the winners have already been notified in advance. To prepare for the awards ceremony, Billy suggests that Project Runway winner Jay McCarroll should design Valerie's dress; Valerie is hesitant, but ultimately decides to wear McCarroll's dress after receiving positive feedback from Billy and Mickey. Gigi, who is struggling emotionally with the show's toxic writing environment, indicates to Valerie that she was not invited to the ceremony by the producers, leading Valerie to bring her along as her guest. Before walking the red carpet, Billy introduces Valerie to McCarroll, who reveals that she is actually wearing the dress backwards. Valerie rushes backstage to change and ends up missing the press and red carpet. At the awards ceremony, Juna wins an award for Favorite TV Star, but the end of her acceptance speech is played off for time just as she begins to thank Valerie.
12	12	"Valerie Shines Under Stress"	David Steinberg	Heather Morgan	August 28, 2005	N/A
As the network prepares to premiere The Comeback, Jane pulls rank on Tom and Paulie G. to get Valerie more lines on Room and Bored, per their contractual obligations; Paulie G. angrily refuses and loudly curses out Valerie and the network. Tom writes a new scene for Valerie, in which she will perform a pratfall stunt while wearing a cupcake suit. Juna receives a death threat from a stalker, forcing extra security on the set; Valerie sets off the metal detector and reveals that she had a metal rod implanted in her back as a child for scoliosis, causing concerns among the crew about her upcoming pratfall scene. During the show's taping, Valerie is unable to perform her pratfall stunt in front of the audience because of a technical delay. The audience is sent home, and Valerie is forced to perform the fall multiple times on an empty set in front of Paulie G. and the writers; Paulie G. is dismissive and offers zero constructive feedback. When Paulie G. makes a rude joke at Valerie's expense, Valerie becomes emotional and punches him in the gut, causing them both to vomit. When Jane tells her the original will be too expensive, Valerie records her own version of "I Will Survive" because she wants it to be the theme song for The Comeback.
13	13	"Valerie Does Another Classic Leno"	Michael Patrick King	Michael Patrick King	September 4, 2005	0.920
While preparing for a final interview, Valerie discovers that Jane has conducted an interview with Paulie G. Assuming that he had talked badly about her, Valerie criticizes his abusive and demeaning behavior on-camera. Valerie invites the cast and crew to a watch party at her house for The Comeback's premiere, which Jane does not attend. Mickey publicly comes out of the closet by attending the party with Robert. Valerie is horrified to discover that the show has been edited to portray her in a poor light, and that Paulie G. had actually spoken positively about her in his interview, painting her as the antagonist between the two. Valerie arrives at Jane's house with the camera crew to lambast her for the unflattering portrayal; Jane is flustered and states that she was not responsible for the editing of the show. Valerie decides to quit The Comeback. The next day, Valerie appears as a guest on The Tonight Show with Jay Leno and is stunned to discover that the premiere has been received positively by audiences. Afterwards in her dressing room, Valerie receives a call that the network has renewed The Comeback for a second season. She accepts and giddily embraces Jane.

=== Season 2 (2014) ===
No. overall	No. in season	Title	Directed by	Written by	Original release date	U.S. viewers (millions)
14	1	"Valerie Makes a Pilot"	Michael Patrick King	Michael Patrick King & Lisa Kudrow	November 9, 2014	0.300
Nine years later, Valerie has commissioned a camera crew of USC students to film a reality TV pilot she plans to pitch to Andy Cohen, having found that reality television has become significantly more popular since then. After the cancellation of Room and Bored and The Comeback, Valerie reveals that she has taken part in several student films and infomercials, and that she was part of the original cast of The Real Housewives of Beverly Hills but quit the show during early production. Valerie tries to pitch her pilot to Andy Cohen, after which Valerie, Mickey and the camera crew run into Juna, who has become a global superstar. Billy informs Valerie that Paulie G. has developed an HBO series about his life entitled Seeing Red; Valerie reads the script online and discovers that it will include an unflattering fictionalized version of herself named Mallory Church. Valerie and Mark issue a cease and desist order, and Valerie arrives at HBO headquarters with the camera crew to stop production. At the suggestion of the HBO executives, Valerie instead decides to audition for the part of Mallory and wins it, much to Paulie G.'s chagrin.
15	2	"Valerie Tries to Get Yesterday Back"	Michael Patrick King	Michael Patrick King & Lisa Kudrow	November 16, 2014	0.183
Mark questions Valerie's decision to accept the role in Seeing Red, citing her previous conflict with Paulie G., who is revealed to have been a heroin addict during his time on Room and Bored; Valerie insists that Paulie G. has reformed. Meanwhile, HBO suggests Valerie repurpose her pilot as behind the scenes web content for Seeing Red. Because such a venture requires a union film crew, Valerie reconnects with Jane, who lives a secluded life and no longer works in the entertainment industry. Jane is reluctant to return to producing, but begrudgingly agrees after much persuasion from Valerie. After a fitting with Brad Goreski, Valerie attends an HBO-hosted Golden Globe Awards watch party, where she, Mark, and Jane have a civil but awkward confrontation with Paulie G.
16	3	"Valerie Is Brought to Her Knees"	John Riggi	Amy B. Harris	November 23, 2014	0.221
Valerie arrives on set for the first day of production for Seeing Red and meets her co-star, Seth Rogen, who is playing Mitch, the character based on Paulie G. Valerie is apprehensive about shooting a sexual fantasy scene that Paulie G. has written which depicts Mallory giving Mitch a blowjob. To film the first segment of the sex scene, Paulie G. forces Valerie to stand between two naked actresses imitating orgasm noises, making her uncomfortable. Before filming the blowjob scene, Paulie G. passive-aggressively responds when Valerie interrupts to clarify that the event did not occur in real life. Recognizing the tension between Paulie G. and Valerie, as well as Valerie's discomfort, Seth convinces Paulie G. to reblock the blowjob scene so that Valerie will not appear on-camera.
17	4	"Valerie Saves the Show"	John Riggi	Amy B. Harris and John Riggi	November 30, 2014	0.267
After HBO reduces the budget of Seeing Red, Valerie learns that multiple scenes depicting Mallory at home will be cut. Concerned that the changes will significantly affect Mallory's character development, Valerie impulsively offers her home to the production crew as a free filming location in order to keep the scenes, dismaying Mark. Meanwhile, Valerie takes improv classes at The Groundlings to impress Seth Rogen, while Mickey receives a call from his doctor and learns that he may have skin cancer. Annoyed by the overwhelming presence of the Seeing Red production crew at their home, Mark and Valerie spend the night at an apartment complex that they own. Mark confronts Valerie for uprooting their home life for the sake of her career, but their argument is interrupted by a loud gunshot; upon investigating, the two discover that another tenant in the complex has shot himself in the head. After speaking with the police, Mark is distraught and informs Valerie that he intends to move out to another place with or without her.
18	5	"Valerie Is Taken Seriously"	John Riggi	John Riggi	December 7, 2014	0.216
A new director is hired on the set of Seeing Red to allow an overwhelmed Paulie G. to focus on writing. Concerned about Paulie G.'s growing agitated behavior on set, Valerie reconnects with Tom and tries to persuade him to rejoin his ex-writing partner; Tom seems resentful of Paulie G.'s career resurgence and reveals that the two have not spoken in nearly six years. Mark rents a house in the Palisades and moves out, while Jane informs Valerie that HBO has decided to repurpose her behind-the-scenes footage as a full-scale documentary film. Meanwhile, HBO grants The New York Times an exclusive interview of Valerie, usurping weeks of Billy's work and leading him to an emotional breakdown. When the New York Times reporter Liz praises Valerie's performance in Seeing Red as "brave", Valerie misinterprets the remark as criticism and frets over her performance after secretly viewing the Seeing Red dailies. At the end of the episode, Valerie confronts Liz for further clarification; Liz explains that she meant Valerie's performance was emotionally raw and vulnerable, and positively suggests that audiences are going to see Valerie in a whole new light.
19	6	"Valerie Cooks in the Desert"	Clark Mathis	Michael Patrick King & Lisa Kudrow	December 14, 2014	0.238
Paulie G. begins to experience anxiety when The New York Times publishes an advance review of Seeing Red, which praises the cast's acting performances but pans his writing. Mark informs Valerie that he plans to stay at his rental home for a few weeks longer than planned. Fearing their marriage is in jeopardy, Valerie decides to uncharacteristically cook dinner for Mark after being forced to cancel exclusive restaurant reservations, but learns that she must attend a location shoot in the desert on the same day. Mickey experiences continuous stomach issues due to his cancer medication. Valerie has a chance encounter with Gigi, who has gained a significant amount of weight and breaks down over feeling unfulfilled in her writing career. The location shoot in the desert experiences multiple delays, and Valerie is disconcerted to learn that Paulie G. has not yet written the final scene for the shoot. Reaching her breaking point, Valerie loses her temper and lambasts the production crew for making her wait on set for hours without a finished script. Several hours later, Valerie arrives at Mark's rental home with dinner she has prepared, only to find him asleep.
20	7	"Valerie Faces the Critics"	Michael Patrick King	Michael Patrick King & Lisa Kudrow	December 21, 2014	0.134
Two months later, Valerie takes part in a press junket after being nominated for an Emmy Award. She reunites with Jane's camera crew to chronicle the experience, while also expressing concerns about Mickey's failing health. Mark and Valerie have separated, but they agree to meet over dinner in an attempt to repair their relationship. Jane needs more content to complete the documentary, which is titled The Assassination of Valerie Cherish, and tries to persuade Valerie to let her film the date in secret; Valerie hesitantly agrees to wear a wire. While discussing their relationship issues, Valerie tries to cover her microphone when Mark brings up her past abortion. Mark is angered to realize that Valerie is recording their conversation and they have an intense argument outside the restaurant; Mark confronts Valerie for being self-absorbed and prioritizing her career over their marriage. At the press junket, Valerie is probed with questions about Seeing Red's sexual content and depiction of women, as well as Paulie G.'s inspiration behind the characters of Mallory and Mitch. Afterwards, Valerie has a civil conversation in the elevator with Paulie G., who asks if she is attending Juna's pre-Emmy party.
21	8	"Valerie Gets What She Really Wants"	Michael Patrick King	Michael Patrick King & Lisa Kudrow	December 28, 2014	0.242
Valerie, Mickey, and Jane's crew attend Juna's pre-Emmy party. Juna tells Valerie that she was unhappy with the fictionalized version of herself in Seeing Red and is upset that Valerie has indirectly endorsed Paulie G.'s side of the story by starring in it. Valerie also reunites with Chris, who has become a famous movie star and unsuccessfully attempts to seduce her. Backstage at the Emmys, Valerie finds out that Mark did not accept her invitation to attend. Valerie sees James and confides in him, to which he gives her sage advice about how to balance her career with her home life. Just as the telecast begins, Valerie receives a text message from Mark that Mickey has collapsed at home and has been rushed to the hospital. Valerie immediately darts from the ceremony and leaves behind Jane's camera crew, switching the show to a traditional single-camera setup. At the hospital, Valerie learns Mickey will be okay and finds him in good spirits; Mark returns to Mickey's hospital room and is surprised and happy to see Valerie there. Together, the three of them watch on television as Valerie is announced as the winner of Outstanding Supporting Actress in a Comedy Series.

=== Season 3 (2026) ===
No. overall	No. in season	Title	Directed by	Written by	Original release date
22	1	"Valerie Gets a New Chapter"	Michael Patrick King	Lisa Kudrow & Michael Patrick King	March 22, 2026
Nine years later, Valerie prepares for her Broadway debut as Roxie Hart in Chicago despite having never seen the musical, and chronicles the experience with her young social media manager Patience. After a humiliating and disastrous rehearsal, Valerie quits the show, framing it as an act of solidarity with the Writers Guild of America strike. In 2026, Valerie has developed a podcast called Cherish the Time, and she and Mark have moved into a new apartment in West Hollywood. Billy, who has been promoted as Valerie's manager, informs Valerie that she has been offered a lead role in a new multi-camera sitcom entitled How's That?! on NuNet, but she expresses hesitancy upon learning that it is being written entirely by AI. Later, Valerie films a low-budget indie movie at an assisted-living facility and reunites with Tommy, a resident at the facility who was a guest hairdresser on Valerie's old sitcom I'm It. Valerie and Tommy reminisce about Mickey, who is revealed to have died from COVID-19 several years prior. When one of the residents has a heart attack during filming, a disconcerted Valerie quits the movie and calls Billy to schedule a meeting with NuNet.
23	2	"Valerie Has a Secret"	Michael Patrick King	Michael Patrick King & Lisa Kudrow	March 29, 2026
Valerie and Billy attend an online meeting with NuNet's team, which comes to an abrupt end when Valerie questions the usage of AI. Valerie ultimately decides to accept the role after consulting with studio executive Brandon Wallick, who assures her that although How's That?! will be written by an AI program called Allassist, the process will be helmed by two married showrunners Josh and Mary Abrams. Valerie and Billy also acquire an executive producer credit, which raises Valerie's professional reputation among the entertainment industry. Mark, who has been fired from his finance job, tries to avoid his former boss Greg. While shopping at Trader Joe's, Valerie reunites with Jane, who is working as a cashier. Despite having signed an NDA, Valerie informs Jane that How's That?! is being written by AI; Jane is intrigued and convinces Valerie to let her film the process with a camera crew, intending to create a new documentary about the show's AI-driven writing process. Valerie meets Josh and Mary, who reveal that James has declined an offer to direct the show. Valerie personally arrives at James' house and persuades him to direct How's That?! by revealing that it is being written by AI.
24	3	"Valerie Faces Reality"	Michael Patrick King	Lisa Kudrow & Michael Patrick King	April 5, 2026
Valerie hires Tommy as her official hairdresser on How's That?! and meets the rest of the cast on the set, which is located at Stage 24 of Warner Bros. Studios; Valerie reminisces that Mickey's favorite movie, Now, Voyager, was filmed on Stage 24. When James recommends adding a sentimental scene to the script, the writers' assistant Marco immediately produces a new scene with the Allassist program. Valerie clashes with the show's wardrobe supervisor Carter, who wishes to dress her character Beth as a stereotypical old woman. During the show's first dress rehearsal, the high-strung Josh has a public meltdown over Carter's costuming for another character and storms off set to fire him. After Valerie chastises Tommy for forgetting to bring her wigs to set, Tommy gently suggests that Valerie has unfinished business regarding Mickey's death. Later, Valerie breaks down when she believes the moving company has misplaced the box containing Mickey's ashes. The following day, Tommy finds the box tucked in a bag with Valerie's wigs; Valerie, Patience, and Jane's camera crew sneak onto the scaffolding above Stage 24 and scatter Mickey's ashes across the soundstage lot.
25	4	"Valerie Does It All"	Michael Patrick King	Michael Patrick King & Lisa Kudrow	April 12, 2026
Production on the pilot episode of How's That?! begins; Valerie invites Mark, who has taken up a new job starring in a reality show entitled Finance Dudes, to attend the first taping. After filming the pilot episode, James informs Valerie that he will not be directing future episodes, believing that the script is too predictable and needs real writers. Valerie and the cast are unhappy with the script of the second episode, which includes a nonsensical plot depicting Beth in jail with Nathan Drake from Uncharted; Evan, the set's technology technician, explains that the nonsensical script was caused by an AI hallucination. Valerie tries to convince Josh and Mary to create a new script, but Mary refuses to help, admitting that they were only hired by the studio to supervise the Allassist program and lend credibility to the project. Valerie then expresses her concerns to Billy, who immediately records it as a voice memo and sends it to the studio without her permission. Billy reveals that Mark's bosses want to fire him because of his lack of on-screen charisma; Valerie offers to make a guest appearance on Finance Dudes to save Mark's job.
26	5	"Valerie Lights a Candle"	Michael Patrick King	Michael Patrick King & Lisa Kudrow	April 19, 2026
After receiving the voice memo from Billy, Brandon tells Valerie that Josh and Mary have been fired and that Marco has been promoted as the new showrunner. Brandon also tries to assuage Valerie's concerns about the usage of AI by revealing that the pilot tested well with audiences, and asks her not to inform the rest of the cast about the Allassist program. Unhappy with Marco's incompetent decisions as showrunner, Valerie makes a desperate attempt to salvage the show by contacting Paulie G. and inviting him to the How's That?! set, dismaying Mark and Jane. While watching a live taping, Paulie G. immediately deduces that the scripts are being written by AI. With Evan's assistance, Paulie G. helps to rewrite parts of the script while filming, and the new jokes are well-received by the studio audience. Afterwards, Paulie G. apologizes to Valerie for his poor treatment of her on Room and Bored. Worried that he is being replaced as showrunner, Marco confronts Valerie and threatens to reveal that the show is written by AI to the public if he is fired.
27	6	"Valerie's Home Alone"	Michael Patrick King	Michael Patrick King & Lisa Kudrow	April 26, 2026
Mark leaves to attend Burning Man for the week, while Valerie inadvertently reveals to her co-stars that How's That?! is written entirely by AI. Tommy quits his job as Valerie's hairdresser, citing his issues with the workplace drama. While Valerie and Billy record a Cherish the Time podcast, Jane's girlfriend Peri arrives, worried about her whereabouts. When Billy objects to Jane telling Peri that she is filming a documentary about AI, Jane admits that she did not sign the studio's NDA, as she wanted to inform the public about the dangers of AI taking over jobs. The next day, Billy accuses Jane of sabotaging Valerie and calls security to escort her off the How's That?! set. During a dress rehearsal, Valerie learns that somebody had leaked information about the show's AI-driven production to the public; Valerie is blamed and lambasted across social media for supporting the usage of AI. That night, Valerie watches CNN and discovers that Jane has defended her in an interview, publicly stating that Valerie was not responsible for the show's production and had advocated bringing in real writers. Mark returns from Burning Man early, having learned of the news, and comforts Valerie as she cries.
28	7	"Valerie Chases the Truth"	Michael Patrick King	Michael Patrick King & Lisa Kudrow	May 3, 2026
Valerie finds herself on the outs with the How's That?! production crew for failing to disclose that the show was being written by AI. Valerie encounters Paulie G. and accuses him of leaking the news to the public; Paulie G. denies being the leak and thanks Valerie for previously inviting him to the set, as it helped reignite his passion in writing. Valerie is also consoled by Juna, who commends Valerie for being welcoming towards her during their time on Room and Bored. Valerie films her guest appearance with Mark on Finance Dudes, during which she learns that Mark was fired from his finance job for pursuing multiple sexual affairs with his subordinates while he was married to his first wife. Valerie assures Mark that he has reformed and advises him to stay positive, which gives him the motivation to quit Finance Dudes. At a press event organized by the studio, Valerie is approached by Ridley MacIntosh, NuNet's head of marketing, who reveals that the studio had intentionally leaked the news about the show's usage of AI in order to create buzz days before its premiere.
29	8	"Valerie Cherish"	Michael Patrick King	Michael Patrick King & Lisa Kudrow	May 10, 2026
Following high ratings from audiences, How's That?! is renewed for a second season. Valerie is approached by three well-renowned TV writers, including Jack Stevens; they express discontent that audiences will accept an AI-written show and want her to advocate for writers during NuNet's upcoming press event. Mark reconciles with Greg, while Billy resigns as Valerie's manager to pursue a professional fashion career; Valerie asks Patience to become her new manager, to which she nonchalantly accepts. During the season finale taping, Evan writes new jokes when the Allassist program hits a paywall, and Valerie recounts the incident at NuNet's press event. Brandon reprimands Valerie for publicly undermining the program and reveals they will use an AI-generated version of her if she quits the show. While contemplating the situation with Mark, Valerie receives a lead role offer from Jack for a new show he is writing. The finale concludes with Jane interviewing Valerie for her new role in Jack's show The Judge's Table; Jane commends Valerie for standing up to NuNet and marvels at having watched her evolve over the last twenty years. An epilogue text reveals that The Judge's Table has been nominated for three Emmys in 2027, while How's That?! will be entering its third season with an entirely digital cast.
