= List of The Comeback characters =

The Comeback is an HBO mockumentary series starring Lisa Kudrow, created by Kudrow herself and Michael Patrick King. The series follows the life of Valerie Cherish, an actor struggling to find relevant work in Hollywood after being in a popular comedy series.

The series offers a behind-the-scenes look of the entertainment industry, focusing on television and film, with extensive exploration of the process behind writing, producing and directing comedy. The series features several famous people playing themselves. This is a list of characters from The Comeback.

== Main characters ==
=== Valerie Cherish ===
- Lisa Kudrow plays Valerie Cherish, the central figure of The Comeback. She is the star of a 1989–1993 sitcom, I'm It!, in which she played a young superstar attorney called Becky. In the decade since, Valerie hasn't found acting work, and has fallen out of the limelight. She receives a call from her former network asking her to do a reality show called The Comeback, about an actress attempting to relaunch her flagging career by landing a starring role on the sitcom Room and Bored, a show featuring four sexy singles living in a condominium. Shortly after production of Room and Bored begins, Valerie's role on the show is reduced to an aging supporting character named Aunt Sassy. Valerie thinks she is (or should be) the real star of the show, and is very concerned about her image. She is extremely shallow and ego-driven, and takes great care to ensure that The Comeback doesn't portray her in an unflattering light, although she ultimately fails at this. Valerie usually doesn't bother to learn the names of crew members, nor does she take much interest in matters that do not directly involve her. She is woefully out of touch with current trends, as evidenced by her choices in fashion, decor, and music, as well as a general misunderstanding of reality television. Although she had become a housewife while unemployed, she engages in very little domestic activity. The family employs a housekeeper, and Valerie usually foregoes cooking, instead ordering take-out dinners from area restaurants. Valerie indicates that she had appeared in bit parts on shows such as Magnum, P.I., Knight Rider, and Remington Steele prior to her starring role on I'm It! After Room and Bored and The Comeback were canceled, Valerie was part of the original cast of The Real Housewives of Beverly Hills. She quit the show during early production after a disagreement with producers about her portrayal, worried that she would receive the same poor treatment as The Comeback. Otherwise, she appeared in several student films, procedural television crime dramas, and infomercials. After learning that HBO was planning a series called Seeing Red that would portray a fictionalized version of herself negatively, she tries to stop production, but instead is cast to play that character, Mallory Church. At some point in her past, Valerie had an abortion.

=== Mark Berman ===
- Damian Young as Mark Berman, Valerie's loving (and extremely patient) husband. They had lived a quiet lifestyle until camera crews invaded their privacy. Mark is a dedicated businessman with very little understanding of show business. He doesn't seem to be impressed by Valerie's celebrity and is annoyed by the reality show cameras but admits to using cocaine and watching pornography on camera. Valerie refers to Mark most often as "Marky Mark" and also by the nickname "Love Ball". At some point during their marriage, Mark had an affair with another woman. The two are separated during the latter half of season 2, as Mark surmises that Valerie is putting her career before their marriage.

=== Mickey Deane ===
- Robert Michael Morris as Mickey Deane, Valerie Cherish's hairdresser since the late 1980s and her closest friend. Between I'm It! and Room and Bored, he only worked for the actress part-time. Mickey agreed to work for Valerie full-time as she was cast on Room and Bored in order to receive health benefits from the studio. In his free time, he watches a lot of reality shows, and he is delighted to be appearing on one. Mickey is an older, effeminate man who believes that his obvious homosexuality is a well-kept secret. He came out of the closet in the season 1 finale. He remains Valerie's hairdresser through (and beyond) the events of season 2. Valerie realizes how much Mickey means to her when she is terrified by his cancer diagnosis. Valerie refers to Mickey and Mark as "the two most important men in my life".

=== Jane Benson ===
- Laura Silverman as Jane Benson, the producer of Valerie Cherish's reality show, The Comeback. Like many "reality" shows, Jane's production is a misnomer as she has no qualms with premeditated scripting, acting, urgings from behind-the-scenes crew to create specified situations of adversity and drama, or even product placement. Jane seems committed to seeing Valerie is comfortable on camera, yet is not above asking her questions that obviously are designed to provoke strong reactions. Jane is seldom seen on-camera, but her voice is often heard. Jane attempts to limit her communication with Valerie, so as not to sacrifice the "reality" content of the show, but the star constantly seems to be talking to Jane. Valerie will ask her director for advice and "re-shoots" of a particular event, and, while Jane herself has asked for multiple takes of a reaction, Jane will usually deny such requests of Valerie by repeatedly telling her she is forbidden to interact with her in any way. The relationship between the two comes to a head in the season 1 finale. Jane later wins an Academy Award for a short documentary film she produced with her lesbian partner, and has resigned herself to life away from the entertainment industry in the California countryside after the relationship ended. Following much persuasion, however, she reluctantly returns to Los Angeles to chronicle Valerie's life behind the scenes of Seeing Red.

=== Juna Millken ===
- Malin Åkerman as Juna Millken (main cast season 1, recurring season 2, guest season 3), a beautiful, young, blond musician, who (in her first-ever acting role) plays Cassie, the lead character and niece of Aunt Sassy on Room and Bored. Juna and Valerie become fast friends on and off the set. Juna sees Val as her mentor, and Val calls Juna "baby girl," though Valerie is silently jealous of Juna's multifaceted stardom. Between seasons 1 and 2, Juna has become a worldwide superstar, constantly hounded by paparazzi, though she still genuinely cares for Valerie. Although no longer close friends, the two do remain acquainted and keep in contact after Room and Bored's cancellation. Juna indicates that she does not approve of the fictionalized portrayal of herself in Seeing Red and is offended by Valerie's "endorsement" of Paulie G'.s side of the story by starring in it.

=== Paulie G. ===
- Lance Barber as Paulie G., Valerie's main antagonist. He is one of the two cocreators, head writers, and executive producers of Room and Bored. His writing style and personality indicate he is a fan of sophomoric humor. He pushed the change in Valerie's sitcom character because he is very unsympathetic to Valerie herself. Paulie G. disagreed with Valerie's casting from the beginning and constantly seeks to reduce her role on the show. He is resentful of Valerie's attempts to control the creative direction of Room and Bored, despite her efforts to butter him up. He often antagonizes Valerie (usually in a passive-aggressive manner) but otherwise avoids contact with her. Although he is churlish, the editors of The Comeback have polished the finished reality show to portray Paulie G. in a positive light, while Valerie is shown to be the antagonist between the two. When Valerie reconnects with him in 2014, Paulie G. reveals that he was on heroin for the duration of Room and Bored and that he has become clean in the time since. He is writing, producing, and directing an HBO series called Seeing Red based on his account of his time as a sitcom writer and his struggles dealing with Valerie. He clearly does not agree with Valerie's casting in Seeing Red, and he indicates that his struggles interacting with Valerie led to his drug problem. He becomes overwhelmed while producing the series, and the network removes him from the director's chair in mid-production. While Seeing Red is critically praised for its acting performances, Paulie G.'s writing is widely considered the weak link.

=== Tom Peterman ===
- Robert Bagnell as Tom Peterman (main cast season 1, guest season 2), the other of the two co-creators, head writers, and executive producers of Room and Bored. While he tends to agree with Paulie G. that Valerie is an overbearing presence, he attempts to accommodate her requests and show ideas. Unlike Paulie G., Tom tries to communicate calmly with Valerie and treat her with appropriate respect, although his motives are sometimes passive-aggressive. Valerie tends to speak to Tom first when approaching the producers. Tom and Paulie G. met while studying at Harvard and worked as a team until 2008, even winning an Emmy for the Simpsons script prior to Room and Bored. After the sitcom's failure, Tom and Paulie G. had a falling-out and haven't spoken since. When Valerie reconnects with him in 2014, Tom has spent five years as the unheralded executive producer of Nicky Nicky Nack Nack, a popular children's show on Nickelodeon. He is resentful of Paulie G.'s career resurgence and claims that his own career was destroyed by Paulie G.'s drug use.

== Recurring ==
=== Billy Stanton ===
- Dan Bucatinsky as Billy Stanton, Valerie's publicist, hired to earn Valerie magazine covers (due mainly to her jealousy of Juna's photo appearing on the cover of Rolling Stone). Billy is a second-rate publicist who is just starting his own agency. He is very aggressive and tends to push and shove anybody who offends or disagrees with him. The first magazine cover he lands Valerie is for a yoga magazine, despite Val's ignorance of the yoga culture. He remains Valerie's publicist during the events of Season Two.

=== James Burrows ===
- A heightened version of himself, the director of a few early Room and Bored episodes. His interactions with Valerie indicate the two have previously worked together, and he doesn't always see eye-to-eye with Tom and Paulie G. Though Jimmy likes Valerie and genuinely wants to help her succeed, he becomes increasingly annoyed with the presence of the reality crew, as well as Valerie's on-set antics (such as goading the studio audience into pressuring the producers for an additional take of a scene). His attempts to escape Jane and her cameras are usually futile. Jimmy sternly reminds Valerie often that she is not the star of Room and Bored and that her input to the producers is unwelcome. Jimmy was scheduled to be the full-time director of Room and Bored, but he is removed from that post a few episodes into the show's run without explanation, and is later seen directing another series on the same studio lot. Valerie sees Jimmy at the Emmys in 2014, where he gives her some sage advice about how to balance her career with her life at home.

=== Gigi Alexander ===
- Bayne Gibby as Gigi Alexander, a naive playwright from New York City, who is hired to write for Room and Bored. Valerie becomes fast friends with Gigi, with the ulterior motives of getting Aunt Sassy a greater role on the show and attempting to supersede some of the writing decisions of Tom and Paulie G. Sensing Valerie's intentions, the show's creators have forbidden any further fraternization between Valerie and Gigi, although Valerie later takes Gigi as her date to the People's Choice Awards. Gigi has a difficult time fitting in with the "boys' club" mentality of the writers' room, and puts on a considerable amount of weight as a result. Valerie has a chance meeting with her in 2014, when she learns that Gigi is a successful writer on Pretty Little Liars, but has become obese and emotionally damaged following the rejection of an earlier pilot she developed for HBO.

=== Esperanza ===
- Lillian Hurst as Esperanza, Valerie and Mark's housekeeper. She is uncomfortable around the cameras, often simply staring into them with a suspicious glare on her face.

=== Chris MacNess ===
- Kellan Lutz as Chris MacNess. Chris portrays Mooner, Juna's roommate and love interest on Room and Bored. He is curious why Valerie is even on the show, due to the fact she is twice as old as the remainder of the cast. Chris had a difficult childhood, and lived with an alcoholic father, which causes Chris to emotionally break down whenever he is put into a stressful situation with an authority figure. Chris has become a big movie star in the time between season 1 and season 2. He admits to having a crush on Valerie and unsuccessfully attempts to seduce her.

=== Patience ===
- Ella Stiller as Patience, Valerie's social media manager.

=== Season One ===
==== Shayne Thomas ====
- Kimberly Kevon Williams as Shayne Thomas. Shayne plays Dylan, Juna's roommate on Room and Bored. As a teenager, Shayne starred on a Disney Channel sitcom. She is a Christian who objects to the sexual content of Valerie's reality show, but overlooks the obvious sexual innuendo included within Room and Bored because she is playing a character and is not being "herself".

==== Jesse Wood ====
- Jason Olive as Jesse Wood. Jesse plays Stitch, one of Juna's male roommates on Room and Bored. He had been turned down for several acting jobs before landing his role on the show.

==== Wagner Fisk ====
- John H. Mayer as Wagner Fisk, Jimmy's replacement as the Room and Bored director. He and Valerie have an amicable relationship, as he directed every episode of the first season of I'm It!. Wagner is a pushover, and was the victim of domestic violence by his wife. Room and Bored is his first directing job in several years.

==== Francesca Berman ====
- Vanessa Marano as Francesca Berman, Valerie's preteen stepdaughter. Francesca has generally tried to avoid Valerie, but becomes very eager to bond with her stepmother when in front of the reality show cameras. Francesca lives primarily with her birth mother, but on occasion stays with Mark and Valerie. She is often seen text-messaging her friends, including those in the same room. In one episode, an unsupervised Francesca throws a pool party, complete with wine and cigarettes. When Valerie discovers this, the footage shot by Jane's crew is edited to portray Valerie as an irresponsible parent.

==== Kaveen Kahan and Greg Narayan ====
- Maulik Pancholy and Amir Talai as Kaveen Kahan and Greg Narayan, a comedy duo brought in by the network to spice up Room and Bored as Juna's foreign pen pals. Tom and Paulie G. find them hilarious, but the original cast (except for Valerie) resents their involvement. They are antagonistic with the original cast, and one remark even causes Chris to start a fight with them. They are disaffectionately known as the "beetee beetee boys" by the original cast, mocking their comedy duo routine, which plays heavily on faux-Indian accents.

==== Peter ====
- Nathan Lee Graham as Peter, the wardrobe supervisor for Room and Bored.

==== Eddie ====
- Tom Virtue as Eddie, the stage manager of Room and Bored.

=== Season Two ===
==== Seth Rogen ====
- Seth Rogen as a version of himself. Rogen is cast on Seeing Red as Mitch, the character based on Paulie G. Rogen's charming personality and tendency to make sarcastic remarks helps to lighten tension on set. He has shown an ability to sense when Paulie G. is being overly passive-aggressive toward Valerie, and he comes to her aid on more than one occasion in those situations.

==== Tyler Beck ====
- Mark L. Young as Tyler Beck, Mark and Valerie's nephew, a production assistant (and general nuisance) on the documentary crew following Valerie.

==== Andie Tate ====
- Meryl Hathaway as Andie Tate, a choreographer turned director who relieves Paulie G. as the director of some of the later Seeing Red episodes

==== Marianina ====
- Rose Abdoo as Marianina, Valerie's secondary hairdresser, whose only job is to apply her wig.

==== Ron Wesson ====
- Brian Delate as Ron Wesson, the line producer for Seeing Red.

==== Shayna ====
- Zoe Chao as Shayna, an assistant director for Seeing Red.

=== Season 3 ===
==== Mary Abrams ====
- Abbi Jacobson as Mary Abrams, a disillusioned writer who is skeptical of the AI-driven production.

==== Josh Abrams ====
- John Early as Josh Abrams, Mary’s husband and writing partner who previously created a show called Fetch.

==== Brandon Wallick ====
- Andrew Scott as Brandon Wallick, a slick studio executive who convinces Valerie to headline the AI-scripted series How’s That?!.

==== Frank Flynn ====
- Tim Bagley as Frank Flynn, Valerie’s co-star on How’s That?!.

==== P.D.P ====
- Matt Cook as P.D.P, a cast member on How’s That?!.

==== Dean ====
- Zane Phillips as Dean, a cast member on How’s That?!.

==== Gabrielle ====
- Brittany O'Grady as Gabrielle, a cast member on How’s That?!.

==== Walter ====
- Barry Shabaka Henley as Walter, a cast member on How’s That?!.

==== Marco ====
- Tony Macht as Marco, the writers' assistant.

== Cameos ==
Because the show is set in modern-day Hollywood, celebrities and media personalities often play themselves in cameo appearances:

- Billy Bush
- Julie Chen
- Andy Cohen
- Fran Drescher
- Charla Faddoul
- Kim Fields
- Kate Flannery
- Jane Fonda
- Sara Gilbert
- Brad Goreski
- Chelsea Handler
- Sean Hayes
- Marilu Henner
- Jane Kaczmarek
- Jay Leno
- George Lopez
- Trixie Mattel
- Jay McCarroll
- Conan O'Brien
- Sharon Osbourne
- Melissa Rivers
- RuPaul
- Aisha Tyler
- Sheryl Underwood
- Lisa Vanderpump
