= 25 Words or Less (board game) =

1996 board game

- Box cover and game layout
- Publishers: Winning Moves
- Players: four or more (in two teams)
- Setup time: 5 minutes
- Playing time: 20–40 minutes
- Chance: Low
- Skills: Word Association; Bidding; Clue-giving

25 Words or Less is a party board game in which two teams of players take turns bidding words back and forth, until one team allows the other to try to give that number of clues to their team to try guessing five words from a card in only one minute. It was first published by Winning Moves Games USA in 1996 and was republished in 2006 as 25 Words or Less: People, Places and Things Edition. The game is no longer in production.

== Gameplay ==
The game is played by one player from each of the two teams drawing a card (one between the two of them) and looking at the five words on the card. They then begin bidding words, starting at 25 and working backward, until one player passes. The player who passed then flips the timer, and the other player has one minute to give clues to their team, to try to get them to guess each of the five words on the card, where each word in the giver's clues counts as one of the words bid. If the Giver manages to get their team to guess all five words, their team keeps the card. If they run out of time, the card passes to the other team. Two new players from each team then start the next turn of bidding after looking at a new card. The game ends once one team has collected ten cards.

A game show version of this aired in summer 2018 in syndication hosted by Meredith Vieira. It premiered as a regular series on September 16, 2019.
