= Intimate Portrait =

American biographical documentary television series (1993–2005)

- Genre: Biographical
- Presented by: Meredith Vieira
- Narrated by: Linda Emond; Lisa Friedman
- Country of origin: United States
- Original language: English
- No. of seasons: 12
- No. of episodes: 271

Production
- Running time: 60 minutes
- Production company: Gay Rosenthal Productions

Original release
- Network: Lifetime
- Release: November 14, 1993 – October 3, 2005

Intimate Portrait was a biographical documentary television series on the Lifetime cable network hosted by Meredith Vieira and focusing on different female celebrities, including stars from the fields of cinema, music, politics, sports and others, which includes interviews with each subject and appearances by numerous stars discussing the subject. 12 seasons were made with a total of 271 episodes, airing from January 3, 1994, to October 3, 2005. The series utilises stock footage, on-camera interviews, and photographs of the celebrities as children.

== List of Stars ==
=== Season 1 ===
(Notes: The series screened internationally, and dates are typical of original US broadcast sheet)

Name of star	Broadcast date	Field	Narrator
Jackie Onassis	November 14, 1993	Politics (former United States First Lady)	Sharon Gless
Rose Kennedy	February 19, 1995	Politics	
Marla Maples	March 12, 1995	television personality	
Mary Magdalene	April 23, 1995	Biblical Figure	
Josie Natori	June 4, 1995	Fashion designer	
Yoko Ono	November 21, 1995	artist, musician, activist, and filmmaker	
Grace Kelly	November 28, 1995	Actress	

Season 2

Name of star	Broadcast date	Field	Narrator
Maya Angelou	February 4, 1996	Civil Rights Activist	
Sally Field	March 24, 1996	Actress	
Audrey Hepburn	April 28, 1996	Actress	
Marilyn Monroe	May 26, 1996	Actress	
Natalie Wood	June 16, 1996	Actress	
Gloria Estefan	July 7, 1996	Singer	
Janet Leigh	October 20, 1996	Actress	
Reba McEntire	November 10, 1996	Actress and Singer	
Shirley MacLaine	December 1, 1996	Actress	
Vanessa Williams	December 8, 1996 (season 2, episode 10)	Singer, actress, fashion design	unknown
Eve	December 13, 1996	Rapper	
The Virgin Mary	December 20, 1996	Biblical Figure	
Eva Peron	December 22, 1996	politician	
Kathie Lee Gifford	January 1, 1997	television presenter, singer, songwriter, actress, and author	

=== Season 3 ===
Name of star	Broadcast date	Field	Narrator
Queen Latifah	February 8, 1997	Rapper	
Esther	March 23, 1997	Biblical Figure	
Bette Midler	March 30, 1997	Singer	
Brett Butler	April 8, 1997	Actress	
Valerie Bertinelli	April 29, 1997	Actress	
Carol Burnett	May 4, 1997	TV talk show hostess, actress, comedienne, singer, writer	Rita Moreno
Celine Dion	June 15, 1997	Singer	
Heather Locklear	July 27, 1997	Actress	
Joan Lunden	July 29, 1997	journalist	
Cleopatra	August 3, 1997	Historical Figure	
Cybill Shepard	September 15, 1997	Actress	
Jane Seymour	September 16, 1997	historical figure	
Patricia Richardson	September 28, 1997	Actress	
Dr. Susan Love	October 22, 1997	Doctor	
Wynonna	November 9, 1995	country music singer	
Debbie Allen	December 7, 1997	actress, dancer, choreographer, singer, director and producer	
Sally Jessy Raphael	December 28, 1997	retired talk show host	
Mary Tyler Moore	January 1, 1998	Actress	
