= 25 Words or Less =

American television game show

- Genre: Game show
- Based on: 25 Words or Less
- Directed by: Manny Rodriguez
- Presented by: Meredith Vieira
- Announcer: Jamie Anderson; Marc Istook
- Theme music composer: Scott Szabo
- Country of origin: United States
- Original language: English
- No. of seasons: 7
- No. of episodes: 1,166

Production
- Executive producers: Bruce Sterten; Dan Bucatinsky; John Quinn; Lisa Kudrow; Mary McCormack; Meredith Vieira; Michael Morris
- Producers: Tara Kowelsi; Dave Hanson; Sydney Smith; Tucker Menzies
- Production location: Sunset Las Palmas Studios, Los Angeles, California Atlanta, Georgia Jersey City, New Jersey
- Camera setup: Multi-camera
- Running time: 19 minutes
- Production companies: Dino Bones Productions; Is or Isn't Entertainment; Regular Brand

Original release
- Network: Syndication
- Release: September 16, 2019 – present

25 Words or Less is an American television game show. It is based on the board game of the same name. Two teams, each consisting of a celebrity and a contestant, convey mystery words to each other to win cash. Hosted by Meredith Vieira, this show is produced by Dino Bones Productions, Is or Isn't Entertainment, Regular Brand, and distributed by Fox First Run. It first aired in summer 2018 as a three-week summer trial run on nine Fox Television Stations and premiered as a regular series on September 16, 2019.

== History ==
The show premiered on September 16, 2019.

On November 13, 2019, Fox renewed the show for a second season, which launched on September 14, 2020. The second through fourth seasons featured some staging differences to accommodate for the COVID-19 pandemic in the United States, with the two competing teams separated into pods and Vieira hosting remotely from her personal basement studio at her home in New York. On November 18, 2020, the series was renewed for two additional seasons, through the 2022–23 season. On January 31, 2023, the show was renewed through the 2023–24 season. On January 11, 2024, the show was renewed through the 2024–25 season, with production moving to Atlanta. In spring 2025, the show was renewed for the 2025–26 season.

In the spring of 2026, in addition to its renewal, it was announced that 25 Words or Less was relocating production for the 2026–27 season to Jersey City, New Jersey at Parlay Studios.

== Broadcast ==
In summer 2018, the show tested as first run on Fox-owned stations in New York, Los Angeles, Philadelphia, Dallas, Atlanta, Minneapolis, Phoenix, Orlando, and Charlotte. In 2019, the show premiered nationwide on all TV stations. It is currently available on Tubi. It is also available as a 24/7 FAST channel on The Roku Channel.

Beginning with the first taping session of the 2026-27 season on May 4, 2026, 25 Words or Less is streaming episodes live on its YouTube channel as they are happening. Four episodes per day are streamed, with the first stream beginning at 12:00 PM Eastern/9:00 AM Pacific and the second at 5:00 PM Eastern/2:00 PM Pacific.

== Gameplay ==
Two three-member teams, consisting of two contestants and a celebrity (for the first two seasons, it was two celebrities and one contestant), compete in the game.

=== Round 1 ===
In Round 1, team members are called up to the host's podium, one on one. At the podium, they are shown a list of five words to convey to their teammates in 45 seconds via single word clues. In the second season, instead of coming up, the list is shown on the tablet of the two players.

Starting with a varying number of clue words set by the host as the opening bid between 17 and 25, the face-off contestants bid against each other as to how few clue words they can use to complete the round. The bidding continues until one of the contestants concedes to the other contestant's bid. The contestant who wins the bid then plays the game using the number of words they bid between 6 and 23. The contestant can pass on a word if it is too difficult, returning to any passed words if time remains on the clock.

Clue givers must keep their hands on the electronic tablet at all times. Illegal clues for clue givers includes using the word itself, a part of the word, or a derivative form of the word. Clue givers are also forbidden from using hand gestures. Doing so ends the round immediately, with the opponents earning the points. The round also ends if the clue giver exceeds their word limit for the round.

Contestants score points if they are successful in getting all five words within the 45-second time limit. The other team receives the points if the playing team fails to complete the round. In some episodes, three word sets are played, with each player playing once for 250 points. In other episodes, there are four word sets, with the first two worth 250 points each and the final two 500 points each, each contestant plays once, and then the teams choose a clue giver for the final set.

Contestants and celebrities have an individual tablet and compete in separate studios in Seasons 2 and 3 due to social distancing guidelines resulting from the COVID-19 pandemic in the United States. Only the players active in each round see the clues on their tablet.

Starting with the third season, the celebrities play first, followed by the civilian contestants.

=== Round 2 ===
Round 2 begins with the contestants at the podium while the celebrities are in a soundproof room offstage. In the second season, the celebrities are told to put on a pair of noise-cancelling headphones with music playing in them, but from the third season on, the celebrities make the lists and the contestants put on the headphones.

Clue givers are shown a series of five sets of three words which have been determined by the producers to be of distinct levels of difficulty (in season three the celebrities see the sets of words). Green words are easiest, and worth 250 points, yellow words are more difficult, and worth 500 points, and red words are the most difficult, and worth 1,000 points.

The clue givers alternate first choice of the three words to place in their own five-word stack, with the trailing team choosing first in the first, third, and fifth word sets. The team who chooses second picks from the remaining two words in the set, the unchosen word in each set is discarded. Once the process is done, the contestant/celebrity plays their five words.

Starting in the fourth season, during the second round, two of the words are bonus words. If the clue giver selects a bonus word and the team manages to guess that word during their turn, they receive a $250 cash bonus.

The trailing team, otherwise, whichever one that played last the previous round in a tie, goes first. The teams have 45 seconds and a set limitation of 20 words. Contestants score the points for each successful word and earn a 1,000-point bonus for successfully getting all five. If the clue giver gives an illegal clue in this round, the word in play is removed and the team forfeits the shot at the 1,000 point bonus.

The round will end early if a clue giver exceeds the 20-word limit. Moreover, the second team's round will end if they take the lead or an illegal clue makes it mathematically impossible for them to win.

The team with more points is the champion and moves on to the Money Round to play for $10,000. The losing contestant/team from the main game receives consolation prizes.

In the event of a tie, both civilian contestants face off at the podium with buzzers. The host will begin giving clues to one final word. The first contestant to buzz gives their answer. If correct, they are declared the winner and advance to the Money Round, if incorrect, their opponent wins.

=== Money Round ===
In the Money Round, the champion must convey 10 words to their celebrity partners (or, beginning in Season 3, one civilian partner and the celebrity) in one minute with the maximum of 25 clue words available to them. If the contestant can get the two partners to solve all 10 words, the champion wins $10,000. If they do not succeed, the champion (civilian partners in season 3) receives consolation prizes, such as a trip. If the clue giver exceeds the 25 clue word limit, or gives an illegal clue at any time, the round ends.

For the second season of the show, a new rule was introduced in which the contestants are also playing for a "SuperFan" who registered via the show's website or on social media accounts. The losing contestant in the main game receives consolation prizes, and the losing SuperFan that they played for receives a $100 gift card. If the champion in the Money Round wins the $10,000, the chosen SuperFan receives $1,000 as well. If the champion fails to win the Money Round, the chosen SuperFan will receive consolation prizes, such as the 25 Words or Less party game.

The third season initiated a returning champions rule, where winning teams could continue to compete as long as they kept winning. Since then, only one SuperFan participant has been featured per episode.

== International versions ==
The Spanish channel Telecinco was the first international broadcaster to launch a local format of the show, called 25 palabras and hosted by Christian Gálvez.

Country	Name	Presenter	Channel	Broadcast
Spain	25 palabras	Christian Gálvez	Telecinco	December 19, 2022 – September 15, 2023
