= Richard M. Cohen =

American journalist (1948–2024)

- Born: Richard Merrill Cohen; February 14, 1948; New York City, U.S.
- Died: December 24, 2024 (aged 76); Sleepy Hollow, New York, U.S.
- Occupations: Journalist; author; television producer
- Employers: CBS News; CNN
- Spouse: Meredith Vieira (m. 1986)
- Children: 3

Richard Merrill Cohen (February 14, 1948 – December 24, 2024) was an American journalist, television producer, and author. He was a senior producer for CBS News and CNN.

== Career ==
Cohen was the recipient of several honors in journalism. He was a three-time Emmy award-winning CBS News journalist.

He was a former senior producer for CBS News and CNN, and he occasionally wrote columns for the "Health and Fitness" section of The New York Times.

== Biography ==
Cohen was born in New York City on February 14, 1948, the son of Teresa (Beitzer) and Benjamin Cohen, a doctor. He had multiple sclerosis since he was 25 years old in 1973. He also had two bouts of colon cancer, one in 1999 and one in 2000.

Cohen, who was legally blind, wrote an autobiography titled, Blindsided: Lifting a Life Above Illness: A Reluctant Memoir.

Cohen married television personality Meredith Vieira (NBC News Special Correspondent and former co-anchor of NBC's Today Show) on June 14, 1986. They lived in Irvington, Westchester County, New York and had three children. Their middle child, Gabe Cohen, was a reporter at KHQ-TV in Spokane, Washington and at KOMO-TV in Seattle, Washington and is now a reporter for CNN based out of their Washington, D.C. bureau.

Jewish website 18 Doors noted that Vieira described Cohen as "a cultural Jew, but not an observant one," though they would celebrate holidays like Passover.

Cohen died from respiratory failure at a hospital in Sleepy Hollow, New York, on December 24, 2024, after battling pneumonia for two months.

== Published works ==
- Cohen, Richard M. (2004). Blindsided: Lifting a Life Above Illness: A Reluctant Memoir. HarperCollins. ISBN 978-0060014094.
- Cohen, Richard M. (2008). Strong At The Broken Places. Harper. ISBN 978-0060763114.
- Cohen, Richard M. (2012). I Want to Kill the Dog. Blue Rider Press. ISBN 978-0399162039.
