= Kabluey =

- Theatrical release poster
- Directed by: Scott Prendergast
- Written by: Scott Prendergast
- Produced by: Jeff Balis; Rhoades Rader; Sarah Feinberg
- Starring: Lisa Kudrow; Scott Prendergast; Teri Garr; Christine Taylor
- Cinematography: Michael Lohmann
- Edited by: Lawrence A. Maddox
- Music by: Roddy Bottum
- Distributed by: Sony Pictures Worldwide Acquisitions Group
- Release dates: June 25, 2007 (Los Angeles Film Festival); July 4, 2008 (United States)
- Running time: 86 minutes
- Country: United States
- Language: English
- Box office: $96,663

Kabluey is a 2007 comedy film written and directed by Scott Prendergast.

It stars Prendergast, as well as Lisa Kudrow, Teri Garr (in her final film role prior to her death in 2024), Christine Taylor, Jeffrey Dean Morgan, and Angela Sarafyan. Chris Parnell also appears in the film as a grocery store manager.

== Plot ==
Leslie, whose husband is in Iraq, is in danger of losing her benefits if she does not return to work.

Salman, her brother-in-law, arrives in her town to help watch over Leslie's two kids. In part this is due to Salman's having no other place to go. He seems a bit spacey and was fired from his last job at a copy shop because he enjoyed laminating so much that he laminated everything in the store that was laminatable (including the money in the till).

Leslie's eldest son, Cameron, takes an instant dislike to Salman and threatens to kill him. Her other son Lincoln follows his lead. Salman's difficulty in handling the two hyperactive children does not impress Leslie, so she asks him to leave. Unfortunately, that's not an option as Salman has no money and nowhere to go.

So, struggling for answers and a way to keep things from falling apart, Leslie finds Salman a job at her company. They will trade off working and watching after the kids. Leslie does not realize that the job Salman gets is as a blue-costumed corporate mascot called "Kabluey". Salman's job as Kabluey is to hand out flyers (advertising office space) on the side of the road for her company, a faltering dot-com called BluNexion. The costume has its unique challenges, being extremely hot inside and having no fingers on the hands, forcing him to grip the flyers under his arms. Standing on the side of the road also seems completely pointless - as the only people who drive by are farmers who don't need office space. Kabluey (the mascot) also interacts with passing road workers, and an insane woman (who lost all of her money investing in BluNexion in an ENRON type scandal) who constantly drives by and even tries to kill Kabluey with her car. Despite all this, Salman finds strange confidence through his suit and alter ego - and his life begins to change.

Salman is asked to entertain at a birthday party in the suit. He manages to gain the respect of Cameron and Lincoln in the process. He later discovers Leslie is having an affair with her boss Brad but is afraid to confront the issue. When he later discovers that Brad is sleeping with another woman, he attacks Brad (wearing the costume) while Brad is in a motel room with the other woman, but not before calling Leslie to the scene.

Confronted with the reality of the situation, Leslie slaps Salman and walks away, but later breaks down in Salman's arms. She tells him that she never loved Brad and never planned on leaving her husband, that the situation had simply developed due to stress and as a way to keep money coming in. Leslie's husband returns home to a family happy to see him, and Salman disappears.

== Cast ==
- Lisa Kudrow as Leslie Miniver
- Scott Prendergast as Salman
- Teri Garr as Suze
- Christine Taylor as Betty Van Buskirk
- Jeffrey Dean Morgan as Brad
- Chris Parnell as Frank
- Conchata Ferrell as Kathleen
- Angela Sarafyan as Ramona
- Patricia Buckley as Elizabeth P.
- Phil Thoden as Noah

Note: Kudrow, Garr and Taylor had previously appeared together on Friends - Garr portraying Kudrow's mother on the show, and Taylor in the role of Bonnie, who is convinced by Rachel to have her head shaved.

== Reception ==
=== Critical response ===
Kabluey was well received by critics. On Rotten Tomatoes it has an 84% rating based on 37 reviews, with an average score of 6.9/10 and a consensus that reads: "An effecting treatise on modern alienation, Scott Prendergast's story of a hapless loser who finds recognition by donning a featureless suit is full of whimsy and sorrow." On Metacritic the film has a score of 62% based on reviews from 11 critics, indicating "generally favorable" reviews.

Nathan Rabin of The A.V. Club gave the film a positive review and wrote: "While the film's social-satire elements are flat and overly familiar, its dry absurdity is unmistakably Lynchian." Dennis Harvey of Variety gave it a mixed review, saying: "Kabluey is short on the cutes and ca-ca jokes. But it's also short on substance, despite a watchable supporting cast and an amiable overall tenor."

=== Awards ===
- Satellite Awards 2008: Best Actress Musical or Comedy - Lisa Kudrow
