= Lisa Kudrow =

American actress (born 1963)

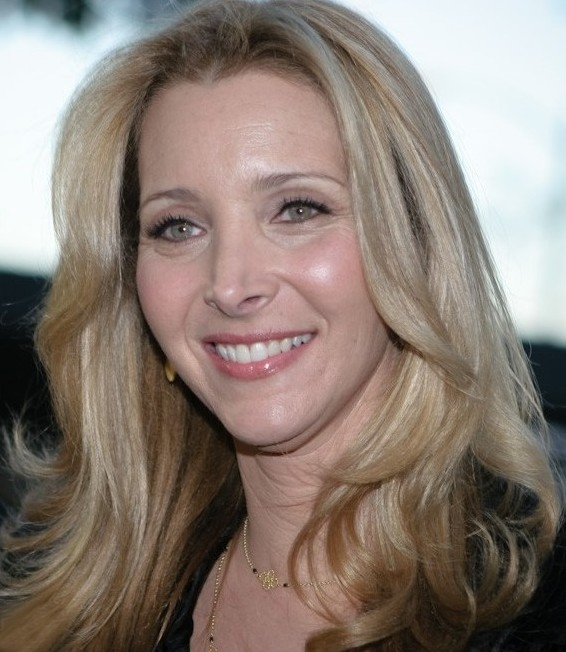
- Kudrow in 2009
- Born: Lisa Valerie Kudrow; July 30, 1963 (age 63); Los Angeles, California, U.S.
- Education: Vassar College (AB)
- Occupations: Actress; writer; producer
- Years active: 1986–present
- Known for: Friends, The Comeback
- Spouse: Michel Stern (m. 1995)
- Children: 1
- Awards: Full list

Lisa Valerie Kudrow (/ˈkuːdroʊ/ KOO-droh; born July 30, 1963) is an American actress, writer and producer. She is best known for her roles as Phoebe Buffay in the NBC sitcom Friends (1994–2004) and Valerie Cherish in the HBO mockumentary The Comeback (2005–2026). Her accolades include two Actor Awards and a Primetime Emmy Award.

In late 1980s, Kudrow began her career in improv comedy and performed with The Groundlings in Los Angeles. Her early television credits include portraying Ursula Buffay in the NBC sitcom Mad About You, a role she later reprised on Friends after it was written in her character Phoebe's storyline. After Friends, Kudrow's television career progressed with roles in the comedy series The Comeback, Web Therapy (2011–2015), Unbreakable Kimmy Schmidt (2016–2019), Feel Good (2020–2021), Space Force (2020–2022), HouseBroken (2021–2023), Time Bandits (2024), and No Good Deed (2024). She also produced the reality program Who Do You Think You Are? (2010–2022) and the game show 25 Words or Less (2018–present).

In film, Kudrow earned praise for her performances in Romy and Michele's High School Reunion (1997), The Opposite of Sex (1998), and Kabluey (2007). She has also appeared in several successful comedies, including Analyze This (1999), P.S. I Love You (2009), Easy A (2010), Neighbors (2014), The Boss Baby (2017), and Booksmart (2019).

== Early life ==
Lisa Valerie Kudrow was born in the Encino neighborhood of Los Angeles on July 30, 1963, the daughter of Nedra, a travel agent, and Lee Kudrow, a doctor who specialized in treating headaches. She has an older sister, Helene, and two older brothers, David and Derrick. She was raised in a middle-class Jewish family and had a bat mitzvah. Some of her ancestors came from Ilya (present-day Belarus). Almost all Jews in Ilya were murdered during the Holocaust, including Kudrow's paternal great-grandmother. Her paternal grandmother left Belarus for Brooklyn, where her father grew up.

Kudrow attended Portola Middle School in the Tarzana neighborhood of Los Angeles. She graduated from Taft High School in the Woodland Hills neighborhood, which was attended at the same time by rapper Ice Cube and actress Robin Wright. She received her Bachelor of Arts in biology from Vassar College in Poughkeepsie, New York, intending to become an expert on headaches like her father. While breaking into acting, she worked for her father for eight years and earned a research credit on his study on the comparative likelihood of left-handed individuals developing cluster headaches.

== Career ==
=== 1989–1994: Early career ===
At the urging of comedian Jon Lovitz, who was a childhood friend of her brother, Kudrow began her comedic career as a member of The Groundlings, an improv and sketch comedy school in Los Angeles. She has credited Cynthia Szigeti, her improv teacher at The Groundlings, for changing her perspective on acting, calling her "the best thing that happened, on so many levels". Briefly, Kudrow joined with Conan O'Brien and director Tim Hillman in the short-lived improv troupe Unexpected Company. She was also the only regular female member of the Transformers Comedy Troupe. She played a role in an episode of the NBC sitcom Cheers. She tried out for Saturday Night Live in 1990, but Julia Sweeney was chosen instead. She had a recurring role as Kathy Fleisher in three episodes of season one of the Bob Newhart sitcom Bob (CBS, 1992–1993), a role she played after taking part in the series finale of Newhart's previous series Newhart. Prior to Friends, she appeared in at least two network-produced pilots: NBC's Just Temporary (also known as Temporarily Yours) in 1989, playing Nicole; and CBS' Close Encounters (also known as Matchmaker) in 1990, playing a Valley girl.

Kudrow was cast as Roz Doyle in Frasier, but the role was re-cast with Peri Gilpin during the taping of the pilot episode. In 2000, Kudrow explained that when rehearsals started, "I knew it wasn't working. I could feel it all slipping away, and I was panicking, which only made things worse." Her first recurring television role was Ursula Buffay, the eccentric waitress on the NBC sitcom Mad About You.

=== 1994–2004: Friends and worldwide recognition ===
Kudrow, the oldest actor of the main cast, reprised the character of Ursula on the NBC sitcom Friends, in which she co-starred as massage therapist Phoebe Buffay, Ursula's twin sister. Praised for her performance, Kudrow was the first Friends cast member to win an Emmy Award with her 1998 honor as Outstanding Supporting Actress in a Comedy Series for her starring role as Phoebe on Friends (NBC, 1994–2004). Kudrow received critical acclaim for playing Phoebe. According to the Guinness Book of World Records (2005), Kudrow and co-stars Jennifer Aniston and Courteney Cox became the highest paid TV actresses of all time, earning $1 million per episode for the ninth and tenth seasons of Friends. Phoebe has since been named one of the greatest television characters of all time. She played Phoebe until the show ended in 2004. The program was a massive hit and Kudrow, along with her co-stars, gained worldwide recognition. Her character, Phoebe, was especially popular. Entertainment Weekly voted Phoebe on Friends as Kudrow's best performance.

During her tenure on Friends, Kudrow appeared in several comedy films such as Romy and Michele's High School Reunion, Hanging Up, Marci X, Dr. Dolittle 2, Analyze This and its sequel Analyze That, and dramatic films, such as Wonderland and The Opposite of Sex. She also guest-starred on numerous television series during Friends, including The Simpsons, Hope and Gloria and King of the Hill, and hosted Saturday Night Live.

=== 2004–present: Later career ===
Following Friends, Kudrow starred as protagonist Valerie Cherish on the experimental three-season HBO series The Comeback (premiered June 5, 2005), about a has-been sitcom star trying for a comeback. She also served as co-creator, writer, and executive producer. Nine years after the original season, HBO revived the series in 2014 for an abbreviated second season. Kudrow received two Emmy nominations for Outstanding Lead Actress in a Comedy Series for her work on The Comeback. Her production company is 'Is or Isn't Entertainment'. Kudrow serves as the executive producer for the U.S. version of the British television series Who Do You Think You Are?, in which celebrities trace their family trees. The subjects of the first series included Kudrow herself, in which it was discovered her great-grandmother was murdered in the Holocaust.

Kudrow co-created an improvised comedy webseries, Web Therapy on Lstudio.com. The improv series, which launched online in 2008, has earned several Webby nominations and one Outstanding Comedic Performance Webby for Kudrow, who plays therapist Fiona Wallice. She offers her patients three-minute sessions over iChat. In July 2011, a reformatted, half-hour version of the show premiered on Showtime, before being cancelled in 2015 after four seasons. Kudrow has guest starred on multiple television series such as Cougar Town, BoJack Horseman, Angie Tribeca, Unbreakable Kimmy Schmidt, and Scandal.

Kudrow has appeared in multiple comedic films such as Happy Endings, Hotel for Dogs, Easy A, Neighbors and its sequel Neighbors 2: Sorority Rising, Long Shot, and Booksmart. She also appeared in the romantic drama film P.S. I Love You and co-starred in the thriller film The Girl on the Train.

Along with Mary McCormack, Kudrow has been an executive producer of the syndicated game show 25 Words or Less since 2019; Kudrow herself sometimes plays as a celebrity guest on the show. Kudrow played Hypatia of Alexandria in a 2020 episode of The Good Place, and starred as Maggie Naird in the Netflix comedy series Space Force. She reunited with fellow Friends cast mates for the HBO Max unscripted television special Friends: The Reunion in May 2021.

Kudrow starred as Lydia in the Netflix comedy-drama No Good Deed in December 2024, earning positive reviews from critics. Kudrow reprised her role as Valerie Cherish in 2026 for the critically acclaimed third season of The Comeback.

== Personal life ==
Kudrow married French advertising executive Michel Stern on May 27, 1995. They live in Beverly Hills, California, and have a son born on May 7, 1998. Kudrow's pregnancy was written into the fourth season of Friends, with her character having triplets as a surrogate mother for her half-brother and his wife. In addition to her Beverly Hills home, Kudrow maintained a penthouse in Park City, Utah, which she sold in April 2017. She revealed in 2019 that she had experienced body dysmorphic disorder while working on Friends.

== Filmography ==
Key
†	Denotes works that have not yet been released

=== Film ===
Year	Title	Role	Notes
1986	America 3000	Warrior Women Leader	Uncredited
1989	L.A. on $5 a Day	Charmer	Short film
1991	To the Moon, Alice	Friend of Perky Girl	Short film
1991	The Unborn	Louisa	
1992	Dance with Death	Millie	
1992	In the Heat of Passion	Esther	
1994	In the Heat of Passion II: Unfaithful	Teller	
1995	The Crazysitter	Adrian Wexler-Jones	
1996	Mother	Linda	
1997	Romy and Michele's High School Reunion	Michele Weinberger	
1997	Clockwatchers	Paula	
1997	Hacks	Reading Woman	
1998	The Opposite of Sex	Lucia DeLury	
1999	Analyze This	Laura MacNamara Sobel	
2000	Hanging Up	Maddy Mozell	
2000	Lucky Numbers	Crystal	
2001	All Over the Guy	Marie	
2001	Dr. Dolittle 2	Ava	Voice
2002	Bark!	Dr. Darla Portnoy	
2002	Analyze That	Laura Sobel	
2003	Marci X	Marci Field	
2003	Wonderland	Sharon Holmes	
2005	Happy Endings	Mamie	
2007	Kabluey	Leslie	
2007	P.S. I Love You	Denise	
2009	Hotel for Dogs	Lois Scudder	
2009	Powder Blue	Sally	
2009	Paper Man	Claire Dunn	
2009	Bandslam	Karen Burton	
2009	The Other Woman	Dr. Carolyn Soule	
2010	Easy A	Mrs. Griffith	
2014	Neighbors	Carol Gladstone	
2016	El Americano: The Movie	Lucille	Voice
2016	Neighbors 2: Sorority Rising	Carol Gladstone	
2016	The Girl on the Train	Martha	
2017	Table 19	Bina Kepp	
2017	The Boss Baby	Janice Templeton	Voice
2018	Lovesick Fool – Love in the Age of Like	Ozma	Voice, Short film
2019	Long Shot	Katherine	
2019	Booksmart	Charmaine Antsler	
2020	Like a Boss	Shay Whitmore	
2021	The Boss Baby: Family Business	Janice Templeton	Voice
2022	Better Nate Than Ever	Heidi	
2025	The Parenting	Liddy	
2027	Romy and Michele 2 †	Michele Weinberger	Filming

=== Television ===
Year	Title	Role	Notes
1989	Married to the Mob		Pilot
1989	Cheers	Emily	Episode: "Two Girls for Every Boyd"
1989	Just Temporary	Nicole	Television film
1990	Newhart	Sada	Episode: "The Last Newhart"
1990	Life Goes On	Stella	Episode: "Becca and the Band"
1991	Murder in High Places	Miss Stich	Television film
1992	Room for Two	Woman in Black	Episode: "Not Quite... Room for Two"
1993	Flying Blind	Amy	Episode: "My Dinner with Brad Schimmel"
1993	Bob	Kathy Fleisher	3 episodes
1993–1994	Coach	Lauren / Nurse Alice	2 episodes
1993–1999	Mad About You	Ursula Buffay	24 episodes
1994–2004	Friends	Phoebe Buffay	Main role, 236 episodes
1995–2001	Friends	Ursula Buffay	Recurring role, 8 episodes
1996	Hope & Gloria	Phoebe Buffay	Episode: "A New York Story"
1996	Duckman	Female Beta Maxians	Voice, episode: "The One with Lisa Kudrow in a Small Role"
1996	Saturday Night Live	Host	Episode: "Lisa Kudrow/Sheryl Crow"
1997	Dr. Katz, Professional Therapist	Lisa	Voice, episode: "Reunion"
1998	The Simpsons	Alex Whitney	Voice, episode: "Lard of the Dance"
1998–1999	Hercules	Aphrodite	Voice, 4 episodes
2001	King of the Hill	Marjorie Pittman	Voice, episode: "The Exterminator"
2001	Blue's Clues	Dr. Stork	Voice, episode: "The Baby's Here!"
2005	Father of the Pride	Foo-Lin	Voice, 2 episodes
2005	Hopeless Pictures	Sandy	Voice, 2 episodes
2005, 2014, 2026	The Comeback	Valerie Cherish	29 episodes; also co-creator, writer and executive producer
2006	American Dad!	Ghost of Christmas Past	Voice, episode: "The Best Christmas Story Never Told"
2008–2014	Web Therapy	Fiona Wallice	132 episodes; also co-creator, writer and executive producer
2010	Cougar Town	Dr. Amy Evans	Episode: "Rhino Skin"
2010–2022	Who Do You Think You Are?	Herself	Executive producer; Episode: "Lisa Kudrow"
2011	Allen Gregory	Sheila	Voice, episode: "Mom Sizemore"
2011–2015	Web Therapy	Fiona Wallice	44 episodes; also co-creator, writer and executive producer
2013	Wendell and Vinnie	Natasha	Episode: "Swindel & Vinnie"
2013	Scandal	Congresswoman Josephine Marcus	4 episodes
2015	BoJack Horseman	Wanda Pierce	Voice, 7 episodes
2016	Angie Tribeca	Monica Vivarquar	Episode: "Pilot"
2016	Must See TV: An All-Star Tribute to James Burrows	Herself	Television documentary
2016–2019	Unbreakable Kimmy Schmidt	Fairy Godmother, Lori-Ann Schmidt	3 episodes
2017	RuPaul's Drag Race	Guest	Episode: "She Done Already Done Brought It On"
2018	Grace and Frankie	Sheree	3 episodes
2018	Bright Futures	Narrator	Unsold television pilot
2018–present	25 Words or Less	Herself	Recurring guest, also executive producer
2019	Ghosting: The Spirit of Christmas		Television film, executive producer
2020	The Good Place	Hypatia	Episode: "Patty"
2020	Death to 2020	Jeanetta Grace Susan	Television special
2020–2021	Feel Good	Linda Martin	Main role
2020–2022	Space Force	Maggie Naird	Recurring role
2021	Friends: The Reunion	Herself	HBO Max special; also executive producer
2021	History of the Sitcom	Herself	Television documentary
2021–2023	HouseBroken	Honey	Voice, main role
2022	Celebrity IOU	Herself	HGTV
2022	Rick and Morty	Tyrannosaurus	Voice, episode: "JuRicksic Mort"
2024	Time Bandits	Penelope	Main role
2024	No Good Deed	Lydia Morgan	Main role

== Awards and nominations ==
Kudrow has been honored with numerous accolades over her career. For her role in the sitcom Friends, she received six nominations at the Primetime Emmy Awards, winning in 1998 for Outstanding Supporting Actress in a Comedy Series, won two Screen Actors Guild Awards, one Satellite Award, one American Comedy award, and one TV Guide award.

In total, she has received fifteen Emmy nominations, with her most recent nomination in the 2021 Primetime Emmy Awards, twelve nominations and two wins at the Screen Actors Guild Awards, one win and eight nominations at the American Comedy Awards, one Golden Globe nomination, one Banff Rockie award, one Blockbuster Entertainment award, one Chicago Film Critics Association nomination, one Chlotrudis award, two Critics' Choice Television nominations, one Dorian award, one Gracie award, one Independent Spirit nomination, one MTV Movie & TV nomination, one National Society of Film Critics nomination, one New York Film Critics Circle award, one Nickelodeon Kids' Choice nomination, one Online Film Critics Society nomination, one People Magazine award, five nominations and one win at the Satellite Awards, three nominations and one win at the Teen Choice Awards, two Streamy nominations, two nominations and one win at the TV Guide Awards, one Viewers for Quality Television nomination and seven nominations and four wins at the Webby Awards.

Preceded by Samuel L. Jackson	MTV Movie Awards host 1999	Succeeded by Sarah Jessica Parker
