= Meredith Vieira =

American broadcast journalist and television personality (born 1953)

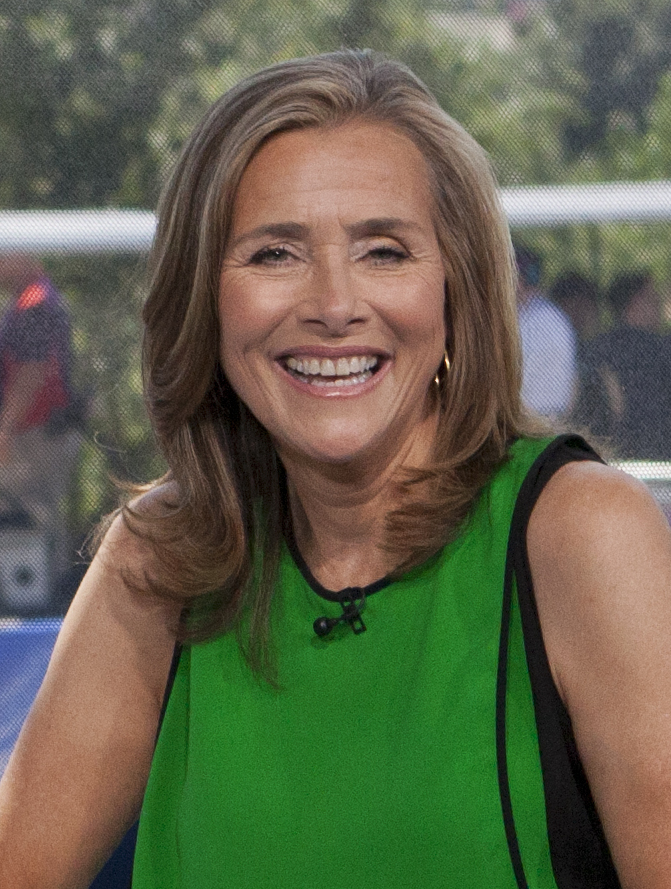
- Vieira in 2012
- Born: Meredith Louise Vieira; December 30, 1953 (age 72); Providence, Rhode Island, U.S.
- Education: Tufts University (BA)
- Occupations: Broadcast journalist; television host
- Years active: 1975–present
- Television: West 57th (1985–1989); 60 Minutes (1989–1991); The View (1997–2006); Who Wants to Be a Millionaire (2002–2013); Today (2006–2011, 2017, 2019); Dateline NBC (2006–present) The Meredith Vieira Show (2014–2016); 25 Words or Less (2019–present)
- Spouse: Richard M. Cohen (m. 1986; died 2024)
- Children: 3

Meredith Louise Vieira (born December 30, 1953) is an American broadcast journalist and television personality. She is best known as the original moderator of the daytime talk show The View (1997–2006), the original host of the syndicated daytime version of the game show Who Wants to Be a Millionaire (2002–2013), and as co-host of the NBC morning news program Today (2006–2011). As of 2019, she hosts the syndicated weekday game show 25 Words or Less.

Vieira has also been a contributor to Dateline NBC, Rock Center with Brian Williams, and NBC Nightly News, and hosted the Lifetime television series Intimate Portrait (1994–2005). From 2014 to 2016, she hosted her own syndicated daytime talk show, The Meredith Vieira Show.

== Early life ==
Vieira was born on December 30, 1953, in Providence, Rhode Island. She was raised nearby in East Providence. Her mother is Mary Elsie (Rosa), a homemaker, and her father, Edwin Vieira, is a physician, both first-generation Portuguese Americans. She is the youngest of four children, with three older brothers. All four of Vieira's grandparents came from the Azores—three from Faial Island, one of the nine islands in the archipelago. The family name Vieira means "scallop" in Portuguese. They immigrated to New England in the late-19th and early-20th centuries, settling around Providence, Rhode Island. Vieira was raised in the Roman Catholic faith, but she has stated in recent interviews that she has "spirituality, not a religion".

Vieira attended the Lincoln School, a Quaker all-girls school in Providence, graduating in 1971. She graduated with a degree in English from Tufts University in 1975.

== Career ==
=== Beginnings on radio and local TV (1975–1982) ===
Vieira began her broadcasting career in 1975 as a news announcer for WORC radio in Worcester, Massachusetts, doing afternoon-drive news during the B. J. Dean Show. She began a career in television working as a local reporter and anchor at WJAR-TV in Providence, eventually making her way into the newsroom at WCBS-TV in New York City where she was an investigative reporter from 1979 to 1982.

=== CBS News (1982–1993) ===
Vieira first gained national recognition as a CBS reporter based in its Chicago bureau from 1982 to 1984. She later became a correspondent for nationwide news-magazine shows including West 57th (1985–89) and 60 Minutes (1989–91). Her final assignment at CBS was as co-anchor of the CBS Morning News (1992–93).

=== Move to ABC, Turning Point; Intimate Portrait; The View (1994–2006) ===
Vieira moved to ABC initially as one of six regular correspondents for the news-magazine show Turning Point (1994–99), and was also the host of the Lifetime Network's show Intimate Portrait, which debuted on January 3, 1995, and ran until August 28, 2004.

Vieira served as the original moderator and co-host of ABC's daytime talk show The View from its debut on August 11, 1997, until June 9, 2006. As moderator, she was responsible for opening and closing each of the show's live episodes, introducing "Hot Topics," guiding conversations, and breaking to commercials. On her final episode of The View, Vieira's co-hosts gave her a roast to commemorate her departure.

Vieira explained what led her to become The View's moderator in an interview with the Pittsburgh Post-Gazette, by making the following statement:

Once I realized I was a reporter who didn't want to report because it required a tremendous amount of travel, nobody was too interested in having me work for them. I had to reinvent myself.

In August 2006, Vieira told Time that she hasn't watched The View since she left the show, except the episode when Star Jones announced she was leaving. She said it was "very sad" what's happened to it: "I'm proud of the work we did there, but it's not a good time in the history of the show... It's hard to watch. It sort of became a joke." On August 29, 2006, Vieira told the New York Post that she didn't mean that The View was a joke. She said the interview was taken out of context. "I felt that the media was turning [The View] into a joke, not that the show was a joke," she says. Time added a clarification to its website, saying "[Vieira] assures Time that in no way were her comments meant to be insensitive or derogatory..."

=== Who Wants to Be a Millionaire (2002–2013) ===
Vieira became the first host of the American syndicated version of Who Wants to Be a Millionaire on September 16, 2002; prior to that, American audiences had known it as a primetime show on ABC hosted by Regis Philbin. Rosie O'Donnell (who would later succeed Vieira on The View) was originally offered to host the syndicated version, but rejected it almost immediately. Vieira won two Daytime Emmy Awards for Outstanding Game Show Host for her hosting duties on Millionaire (one in 2005, the other in 2009); as such, she is the second woman ever to win an Emmy Award in this category (after Betty White for Just Men! in 1983), and the first to win multiple times. In addition to hosting the show, Vieira also served as its co-executive producer, a title that she would hold from 2005 until her departure from the show.

ABC originally offered Vieira hosting duties on the syndicated Millionaire to sweeten one of her re-negotiations for The View. When the show was honored by GSN on its 2007 Gameshow Hall of Fame special, one of the show's executive producers, Leigh Hampton, said that when the syndicated version was being developed, the production team felt that it was not feasible for Philbin to continue hosting, as the show recorded four episodes in a single day, and that the team was looking for qualities in a new host: it had to be somebody who would love the contestants and be willing to root for them. After O'Donnell declined the opportunity to host the syndicated version, Vieira was the one that the team settled on, because she had the above-mentioned qualities. On the special, Vieira herself gave the following explanation for why she decided to host the syndicated Millionaire:

I did the show because I fell in love with the show, and really, first and foremost, as a parent, [I feel that] there aren't that many shows on television that you can watch as a family. And when [the U.S. version's executive producer] Michael Davies approached me and said, "Would you be interested in hosting the syndicated version?", I said, "Just point me toward the contract! I am so there!"

Prior to hosting the syndicated version of Millionaire, Vieira was a celebrity contestant in a special tournament on the third season of the original primetime version, winning $250,000 for her selected charitable organization, the Windows of Hope Family Relief Fund. Seven and three-quarter years later, she would even turn the tables on Philbin himself with her surprise appearance on the finale of the show's 10th anniversary primetime revival on August 23, 2009—hosting its final segment while giving him the opportunity to answer one question in order to win $50,000 for his selected organization, Cardinal Hayes High School in the Bronx.

On January 10, 2013, Vieira announced that after eleven seasons with the syndicated Millionaire, throughout which she had hosted more than 1,800 episodes and offered a vast multitude of contestants a combined total of over $70,000,000, she would be leaving the show as part of an effort to focus on other projects in her career. She finalized taping of her last episodes with the show in November 2012.

=== Today and The Meredith Vieira Show (2006–2016) ===
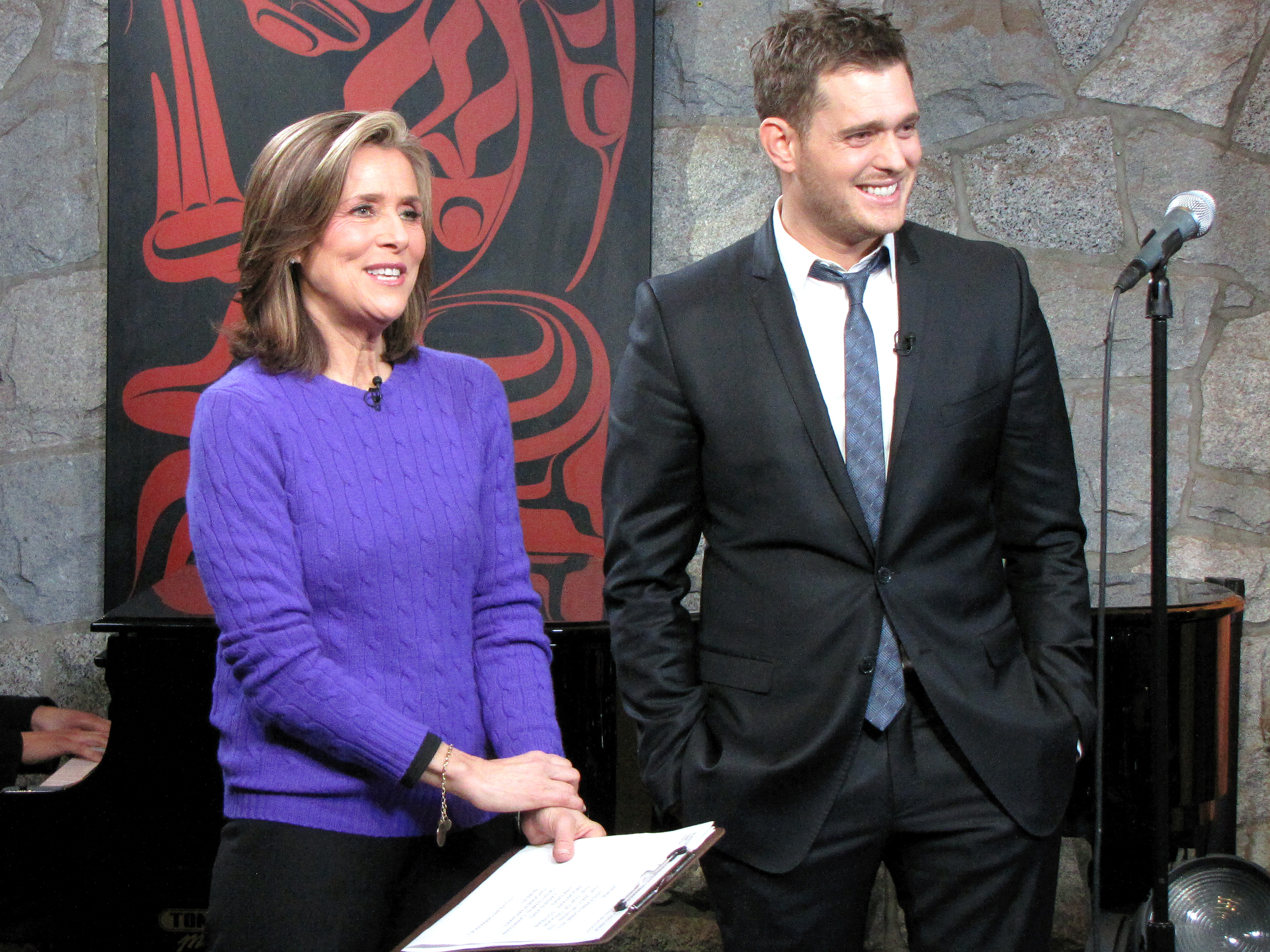
Vieira with Michael Bublé in 2010

Vieira accepted an offer to succeed Katie Couric as co-anchor of Today on April 6, 2006, the day after Couric announced that she would depart the show to become anchor of the CBS Evening News. The following day, Vieira announced on The View that she would be leaving the show to be co-anchor of Today, a role that The View co-host and ABC News journalist Barbara Walters had filled nearly four decades earlier during her tenure at NBC during the 1960s and 1970s. Vieira was replaced as the moderator of The View by Rosie O'Donnell. Vieira hosted the show with Matt Lauer from September 13, 2006, through June 8, 2011, also becoming a contributing anchor for Dateline NBC.

Vieira continued as host of Millionaire while appearing on Today. As part of her contract with Millionaire, Vieira agreed not to appear on Today during hours that would conflict with the airing of the game show on competing stations. As a result, she rarely appeared on the third or fourth hours of Today. Her first appearance during the third hour came on June 25, 2008, for "Today Throws a Wedding". She also appeared during the entire third hour during the 2008 Beijing Summer Olympics, 2010 Vancouver Winter Olympics and the Barack Obama inauguration on January 20, 2009.

Vieira announced on May 9, 2011, that she would depart as co-host in the following month but would remain with Today in the role of special correspondent. Her last appearance as regular co-host was on June 8; she returned to the show for the Halloween broadcast on October 31, 2011, and again as special co-host with Matt Lauer in London, United Kingdom for the Diamond Jubilee of Queen Elizabeth II. She has remained with NBC in a minimized role and became a contributor to Dateline NBC and a correspondent on Rock Center with Brian Williams. In January 2013, she filled in for Kathie Lee Gifford on the fourth hour of Today, appearing alongside Hoda Kotb, and she reported the story Inconceivable on Dateline NBC.

Vieira was one of the hosts for NBC's coverage of the 2012 London Summer Olympics. She and co-host Matt Lauer were criticized for their NBC coverage of the opening ceremony. Vieira also provided some Today Olympics coverage during the games. Vieira co-hosted the opening ceremony of the 2014 Sochi Winter Olympics with Matt Lauer, and was slated to provide coverage during the two weeks of the games. On February 14, 2014, she became the first woman to solo anchor NBC's Olympics prime time coverage, alternated with Lauer while covering for an ailing Bob Costas.

In July 2013, Vieira announced that she would begin hosting her own syndicated afternoon daytime talk show, The Meredith Vieira Show, starting in September 2014, produced by NBCUniversal Television Distribution. On January 4, 2016, it was announced that the show would be ending after two seasons. The talk show aired from September 8, 2014 to May 20, 2016 and ended with 290 episodes.

Vieira guest anchored Today with Hoda & Jenna for a few episodes in 2019, due to host Hoda Kotb being on maternity leave.

Although she co-hosted Today with Lauer, Vieira had a hand in his dismissal from the program after learning of her assistant’s claims of being sexually assaulted by Lauer. Vieira urged the woman to bring the matter forward to NBC executives and he was fired shortly after.

=== Other television work ===
In May 2018, Vieira co-hosted Royal Wedding Watch with Matt Baker, PBS's weeklong coverage of the wedding of Prince Harry and Meghan Markle.

=== 25 Words or Less (2019–present) ===
Vieira returned to daytime TV in the fall of 2019 as host of the syndicated game show 25 Words or Less from Fox Television Stations. Based on a board game, the show pairs contestants with celebrities in an effort to guess a list of five words using less than 25 words in total.

== Personal life ==
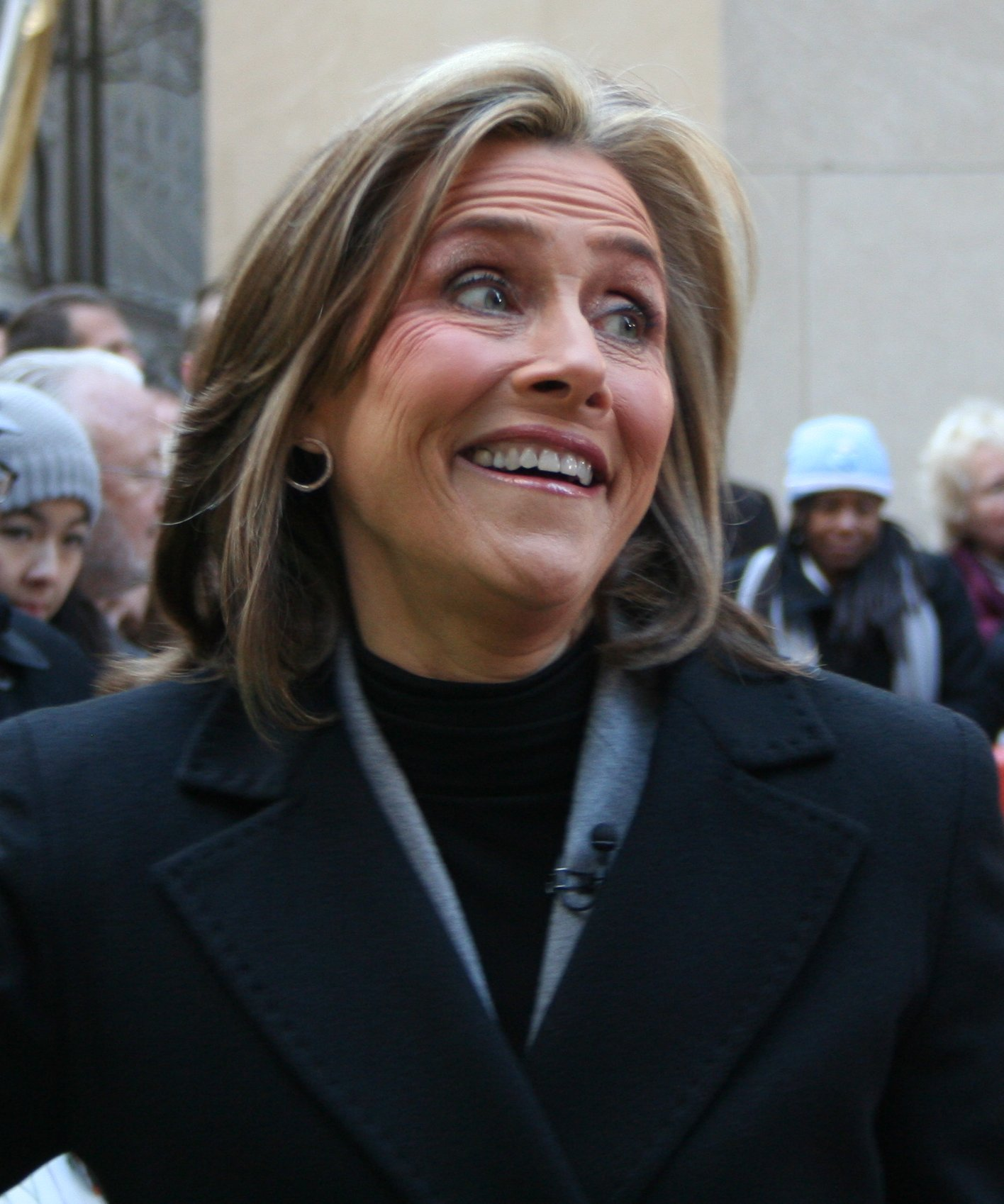
Vieira hosting Today in 2010

Vieira married CBS News journalist Richard M. Cohen on June 14, 1986. They lived in Irvington, Westchester County, New York. Cohen had multiple sclerosis since he was 25 years old, and had two bouts of colon cancer, one in 1999 and one a year later. Her husband died on December 24, 2024, at the age of 76 after living with multiple sclerosis for over 50 years. Vieira and Cohen have three children; their younger son, Gabe Cohen, is a reporter for CNN based out of their Washington, D.C. bureau.

=== Balancing family and career ===
Vieira joined 60 Minutes in 1989, following the birth of her first child. Don Hewitt, executive producer of 60 Minutes, allowed her to work part-time for two seasons so she could care for her child. After that, it was arranged that she would work full-time. But after two years, she became pregnant again and asked to continue the part-time arrangement. Hewitt declined her request, firing her, and deciding instead to hire someone who would work full-time. Her departure from the show garnered headlines, as a national debate started to take place about whether women could balance both family and career. She turned down opportunities to co-host ABC's Good Morning America and CBS's The Early Show when her children were young.

Vieira discusses her family and career decisions in the book Divided Lives: The Public and Private Struggles of Three Accomplished Women by Elsa Walsh.

== Career timeline ==
- 1986–1993: CBS News
  - 1986–1989: West 57th
  - 1989–1992: 60 Minutes correspondent
  - 1992–1993: CBS Morning News co-anchor
- 1994–2006, 2016: ABC
  - 1994–97: Turning Point correspondent
  - 1997–2006, 2016: The View moderator and guest moderator for one episode of the 20th season.
- September 16, 2002 – May 31, 2013: Who Wants to Be a Millionaire host
- 2006–present: NBC News
  - 2007–present: Dateline NBC contributing anchor
  - September 2006 – June 2011: Today co-anchor
  - June 2011–present: NBC News special correspondent
  - October 31, 2011 – June 21, 2013: Rock Center with Brian Williams correspondent
  - 2014: NBC reporter for the 2014 Winter Olympics
  - 2014–2016: The Meredith Vieira Show host & executive producer
  - 2019–present: Guest co-anchor of the fourth hour of Today, Today with Hoda & Jenna, with Jenna Bush Hager
- 2019–present: Host of 25 Words or Less

=== Other notable appearances ===
- 1998: Miss America 1999 host
- 2000: Academy Awards pre-show host for ABC
- 2003: A brief stint in the Broadway show Thoroughly Modern Millie, appearing in various scenes
- 2003: Made appearance on General Hospital as Bree Flanders
- 2003: Made appearance on The Practice (Season 7, Episode 17) as a Security Guard.
- 2004 version of The Stepford Wives, a cameo as the host of a proposed game show
- 2004: Vieira "hosts" a spoof of Who Wants to Be a Millionaire?, called Who Wants to Be King of the Jungle? on disc 2 of the Special Edition DVD of The Lion King 1½
- 2005: Hosts a series of featurettes that are included on the first season DVDs of the ABC television show Desperate Housewives, interviewing cast members and the show's creators
- 2006-10: Co-hosted NBC's live coverage of Macy's Thanksgiving Day Parade alongside the Today Show's Matt Lauer and Al Roker.
- 2007: After her departure in 2006 from The View, Vieira returned to the show to make a guest appearance on the October 8, 2007, episode
- 2007–10: Made guest appearances on the NBC sitcom 30 Rock, in five episodes
- 2008: In a cameo role as the voice of a news reporter in Madagascar: Escape 2 Africa
- 2010: Appeared in the film Get Him to the Greek as herself in a scene where the main characters appear on Today
- 2010: As the voice of Broomsy Witch in Shrek Forever After
- 2010: Made an appearance on the "Chumdog Millionaire" episode of Pawn Stars, in which, in a dream sequence, she reads the million-dollar question to Chumlee
- 2011: A guest investigator on the Ghost Hunters episode "Murdered Matron" when The Atlantic Paranormal Society (TAPS) investigated the Sailors' Snug Harbor on Staten Island, New York
- 2011: Made a cameo appearance in "The Wedding of River Song", the finale of the sixth season of the revived series of the British TV sci-fi drama Doctor Who
- 2012: Made a guest appearance of the sixth season of the 2008 program, What Would You Do?.
- 2015 and 2016: For two years, has been a guest narrator at the Candlelight Processional, held during the Christmas season at Epcot at the Walt Disney World Resort
- 2016: Announcer and co-anchor of the 2016 Rio Summer Olympics on NBC and The Today Show
- 2017: A cameo role as herself on the Netflix show Orange Is the New Black, season 5, episode 8.

== See also ==
- New Yorkers in journalism
