= The Comeback (TV series) =

American comedy television series

- Genre: Cringe comedy; Satire; Found footage
- Created by: Lisa Kudrow; Michael Patrick King
- Directed by: Michael Patrick King; Various
- Starring: Lisa Kudrow; Malin Åkerman; Robert Bagnell; Lance Barber; Robert Michael Morris; Laura Silverman; Damian Young; Dan Bucatinsky; Jack O'Brien
- Country of origin: United States
- Original language: English
- No. of seasons: 3
- No. of episodes: 29 (list of episodes)

Production
- Executive producers: John Melfi; Michael Patrick King; Lisa Kudrow; Dan Bucatinsky
- Camera setup: Single camera
- Running time: 25–55 minutes
- Production companies: Working Class Films (season 1); Michael Patrick King Productions (seasons 2–3); Is or Isn't Entertainment (seasons 1–2); Rialto Films (season 3); Always, Valerie Cherish (season 3); Warner Bros. Television; Home Box Office

Original release
- Network: HBO
- Release: June 5, 2005 – May 10, 2026

The Comeback (titled onscreen as The Comeback: Raw Footage for its first season) is an American sitcom. created by Lisa Kudrow and Michael Patrick King, a former executive producer of Sex and the City, for HBO. Kudrow and King additionally serve as writers and executive producers of the series, with King also having directed several episodes. The series originally aired for a single season of 13 episodes from June 5 to September 4, 2005, before being canceled. Nine years later, The Comeback was revived for a second season of eight episodes that aired from November 9 to December 28, 2014, with the new intent being that a third season would be filmed the following decade. As such, ten years later, it was renewed for a third and final season, also with eight episodes, that premiered on March 22, 2026, with the series finale airing on May 10, 2026.

The Comeback is a satire of the entertainment industry, starring Kudrow as sitcom actress Valerie Cherish. Shot by a two-camera crew, the first season is presented as found footage shot for the fictional reality show within the series, also called The Comeback. The second season is presented as found footage shot by a camera crew originally commissioned by Valerie to pitch a pilot to noted reality TV producer Andy Cohen, later repurposed as behind the scenes web content, and then into a full-scale documentary. The third season is presented as a mix of single-camera scenes and found footage shot by returning filmmaker Jane Benson, with social media and digital and security footage of Valerie's role in an AI-written sitcom also utilized.

The show has received widespread critical acclaim, with particular praise for the writing and Kudrow's performance, which has received three Emmy Award nominations for Outstanding Lead Actress in a Comedy Series.

== Plot ==
Season	Episodes	Originally released	
Season	Episodes	First released	Last released
1	13	June 5, 2005	September 4, 2005
2	8	November 9, 2014	December 28, 2014
3	8	March 22, 2026	May 10, 2026

=== Season 1 ===
The series initially follows Valerie Cherish (Kudrow), a veteran B-list sitcom actress who found fame on a sitcom called I'm It!, which ran from 1989 to 1993. Thereafter, she failed to find substantial acting work and fell out of the spotlight for more than a decade. In 2005, Valerie is cast as Aunt Sassy on a new network sitcom called Room and Bored and as part of landing the role, agrees to chronicle her return to the television industry on a reality television series called The Comeback. However, she continuously struggles with the matter of being an aging, non-influential performer in an increasingly youthful Hollywood, while her every move on and off the set is being documented for the companion reality series.

=== Season 2 ===
In 2014, Valerie initially attempts to produce her own reality television pilot for producer Andy Cohen, having found that reality television has become significantly more popular since she made The Comeback nine years earlier. After she is cast as a fictionalized version of herself on an HBO series called Seeing Red, which chronicles the career of the sitcom writer and producer who tormented her nine years earlier on Room and Bored, the footage is repurposed as a documentary film capturing her second career resurgence as it threatens to destroy her personal life. The end of the season breaks from the found footage format, after Valerie abandons her film crew in favor of her personal relationships.

=== Season 3 ===
In 2026, Valerie returns for a third and final season, finding herself in a television landscape increasingly dominated by AI. After a brief, self-proclaimed "sabbatical" during the 2023 Hollywood labor disputes, Valerie is cast in a new sitcom at her former network, only to discover the series is the first to be written entirely by AI. The season follows Valerie as she attempts to navigate her "new chapter" while struggling with the technology's impact on her craft and personal life. It is presented as a traditional single-camera comedy, with some scenes captured by Valerie's new social media manager, Patience, and returning documentary producer Jane.

== Cast and characters ==
=== Main ===
- Lisa Kudrow as Valerie Cherish, the focus of The Comeback and onetime star of the sitcom I'm It! (1989–1993). After a decade out of the limelight, Valerie is cast as Aunt Sassy on the new network sitcom Room and Bored. Valerie agrees to chronicle her return to show business on a companion reality television series called The Comeback. In the second season, Valerie is cast as a fictionalized version of herself on an HBO series called Seeing Red. In the third season, she is hired as the lead star and executive producer of new sitcom How's That?!, but is conflicted by the series' use of Artificial Intelligence writing.
- Damian Young as Mark Berman, Valerie's loving (and extremely patient) husband. They had lived a quiet lifestyle until camera crews invaded their privacy.
- Robert Michael Morris as Mickey Deane (seasons 1–2), Valerie Cherish's hairdresser since the late 1980s and her closest friend.
- Laura Silverman as Jane Benson, the producer of Valerie Cherish's reality show, The Comeback, and subsequent reality projects.
- Malin Åkerman as Juna Millken (season 1; recurring season 2; guest season 3), a beautiful, young, blonde musician, who (in her first-ever acting role) plays Cassie, the lead character and niece of Aunt Sassy on Room and Bored.
- Lance Barber as Paulie "Paulie G" Gioppino (season 1–2; recurring season 3), Valerie's main antagonist. He is one of the two co-creators, head writers, and executive producers of Room and Bored. He later creates Seeing Red, based on his experiences of making Room and Bored while a regular heroin user.
- Robert Bagnell as Tom Peterman (season 1; guest season 2), the other of the two co-creators, head writers, and executive producers of Room and Bored. While he tends to agree with Paulie G that Valerie is an overbearing presence, he treats her more tactfully than his partner.
- Dan Bucatinsky as Billy Stanton (season 3; recurring seasons 1–2), Valerie's publicist, later her manager and producing partner. Billy joins Valerie as an executive producer on How's That?!, where he displays little interest in the show but becomes enamored by the Hollywood lifestyle.
- Jack O'Brien as Tommy Tomlin (season 3), hairdresser on I'm It who reconnects with Valerie after Mickey's death.

=== Recurring ===
- James Burrows as himself, the director of a few early Room and Bored episodes, as well as the How's That?! pilot.
- Bayne Gibby as Gigi Alexander (season 1; guest season 2), a naive playwright from New York City, who is hired to write for Room and Bored.
- Lillian Hurst as Esperanza (seasons 1–2), Valerie and Mark's housekeeper. She is uncomfortable around the cameras, often simply staring into them with a suspicious glare on her face.
- Kellan Lutz as Chris MacNess (season 1; guest season 2). Chris portrays Mooner, Juna's roommate and love interest on Room and Bored. He is curious why Valerie is even on the show, due to the fact she is twice as old as the remainder of the cast.
- Matt Cook as Ivan (season 2), the technician for Valerie's pilot shoot, and P.D.P (season 3), Ivan's twin brother and a cast member on How's That?!
- Tim Bagley as Frank Flynn (season 3; guest season 2), Valerie's co-star on How's That?!

==== Season 1 ====
- Kimberly Kevon Williams as Shayne Thomas. Shayne plays Dylan, Juna's roommate on Room and Bored
- Jason Olive as Jesse Wood. Jesse plays Stitch, one of Juna's male roommates on Room and Bored
- John H. Mayer as Wagner Fisk, Jimmy's replacement as the Room and Bored director
- Vanessa Marano as Francesca Berman, Valerie's preteen stepdaughter
- Maulik Pancholy and Amir Talai as Kaveen Kahan and Greg Narayan, a comedy duo brought in by the network to spice up Room and Bored as Juna's foreign pen pals
- Nathan Lee Graham as Peter, the wardrobe supervisor for Room and Bored
- Tom Virtue as Eddie, the stage manager of Room and Bored

==== Season 2 ====
- Seth Rogen as himself. Rogen is cast on Seeing Red as Mitch, the character based upon Paulie G. Rogen's charming personality and tendency to make sarcastic remarks helps to lighten tension on set. He has shown an ability to sense when Paulie G is being overly passive-aggressive toward Valerie, and he comes to her aid on more than one occasion in those situations.
- Mark L. Young as Tyler Beck, Mark and Valerie's nephew, a production assistant (and general nuisance) on the documentary crew following Valerie
- Meryl Hathaway as Andie Tate, a choreographer turned director who relieves Paulie G as the director of some of the later Seeing Red episodes
- Rose Abdoo as Marianina, Valerie's secondary hairdresser, whose only job is to apply her wig
- Brian Delate as Ron Wesson, the line producer for Seeing Red
- Zoë Chao as Shayna, an assistant director for Seeing Red

==== Season 3 ====
- Ella Stiller as Patience, Valerie's social media manager
- Abbi Jacobson as Mary Abrams, a disillusioned writer who is skeptical of the AI-driven production
- John Early as Josh Abrams, Mary's high-strung husband and writing partner
- Andrew Scott as Brandon Wallick, a slick studio executive who convinces Valerie to headline the AI-scripted series How's That?!
- Zane Phillips as Dean, a cast member on How's That?!
- Brittany O'Grady as Gabrielle, a cast member on How's That?!
- Barry Shabaka Henley as Walter, a cast member on How's That?!
- Tony Macht as Marco, the writers' assistant
- Julian Murray Stern as Evan, AI technician

=== Cameos ===
Because the show is set in modern-day Hollywood, celebrities and media personalities such as Andy Cohen, Chelsea Handler, Jane Kaczmarek, Jay Leno, Conan O'Brien, RuPaul, Fran Drescher, and Jane Fonda, among others, often play themselves in cameo appearances.

== History ==
The Comeback was conceived in 2004 by Lisa Kudrow and Michael Patrick King, following the final seasons of the sitcom Friends (in which Kudrow starred as Phoebe Buffay) and the HBO comedy Sex and the City, on which King was a director, writer, and executive producer. The central character, Valerie Cherish, was an extension of a recurring character that Kudrow invented while doing improvisational comedy with The Groundlings in Los Angeles. The character, which Kudrow named "your favourite actress on a talkshow", was an egotistical celebrity who lacked self-awareness. Kudrow has cited The Office as an influence on the show's found-footage documentary format, as well as being inspired by the rise of reality television, and the humiliation such shows inflicted upon their participants.

According to HBO, the second season drew an average of 1.4 million viewers across its channels and on demand – Kudrow said she had not "heard it officially," but that she and King had gotten the impression that the door was open for more. Soon, she hoped she and King would begin to "talk about what more would look like." In a 2014 interview with E!, Kudrow also had this to say: "I would love to do more. In 2005, that was an ending, that was definitely an ending because I guess now we see that those episodes were a piece and these episodes were a piece and then if we do more then we will be doing that piece."

On July 21, 2020, the cast reunited on the live streamed web series Stars in the House, raising money for Actors Fund of America.

In June 2025, the series was renewed for a third and final season which premiered on March 22, 2026.

== Reception ==
=== Critical response ===
Critical response of The Comeback
Season	Rotten Tomatoes	Metacritic
1	65% (20 reviews)	58 (25 reviews)
2	86% (35 reviews)	71 (24 reviews)
3	97% (35 reviews)	80 (22 reviews)

==== Season 1 ====
Promotional poster used in 2005 for the first season of The Comeback.

The review aggregator website Rotten Tomatoes reported an approval rating for the first season of 65% based on 20 critic reviews. The website's critics consensus reads: "Intriguingly cynical, The Comeback unfortunately lacks the sharp insight and sympathetic characters needed to skewer showbiz conventions." Metacritic calculated a weighted average score of 58 out of 100 based on 25 critics.

Despite a coveted time slot after the hit series Entourage, The Comeback debuted to low ratings. It was also met with a mixed critical response, yet it was nominated for three Primetime Emmy Awards, including Outstanding Lead Actress in a Comedy Series for Kudrow. HBO confirmed on September 21, 2005, that the series had been canceled after being on the air only 13 weeks. Its initial lukewarm reception and short run notwithstanding, The Comeback was retrospectively lauded.

The show placed #79 on Entertainment Weekly's "New TV Classics" list. In 2009, the publication named The Comeback one of the 10 best shows of the decade, calling it "the most brilliantly brutal satire of reality TV ever captured on screen." In 2012, the magazine listed the show at No. 8 in the "25 Best Cult TV Shows from the Past 25 Years," saying, "Both painfully uncomfortable and deadpan hilarious, The Comeback was spot-on in its inside-showbiz look at the making of a sitcom – while featuring one of the decade's biggest sitcom stars, no less. But it was so inside, it was too inaccessible to a mass audience, or even an audience that might have returned for a second season on HBO." Entertainment Weekly also voted Valerie Cherish on The Comeback as Lisa Kudrow's second-best performance.

The New York Times gave the show a lukewarm review, dubbing it "interesting", but also complaining about a lack of originality in the concept and finding The Comeback ultimately less entertaining than its fellow HBO series Entourage.

In a commemorative article in 2012, UK newspaper The Guardian praised the show for its "bittersweet comedy" and Lisa Kudrow for her "ego-free acting." The newspaper questions whether, in an era where "you can't move for meta-sitcoms," this sitcom was just "too far ahead of its time."

==== Season 2 ====
The second season was met with critical acclaim. On the review aggregator website Rotten Tomatoes the second season received an 86% approval rating based on 35 critic reviews, giving it a "fresh" rating. The website's critics consensus reads: "Substantially similar to its predecessor in all the best ways, The Comeback's resurrection season thrives on Lisa Kudrow's starring performance as Valerie Cherish." It also scored a 71 out of 100 on Metacritic based on 24 reviews. Robert Lloyd of the Los Angeles Times praised the show saying "The current episodes have more weight and intensity; they come off a shade darker and yet more sympathetic to its cast of co-dependent lost souls." Joshua Alston of The A.V. Club also praised it, writing: "The Comeback is the same as it ever was, and more highly concentrated. It still out-metas anything else on television. The performances remain stellar all around." On the other hand, Kristi Turnquist gave the show a mixed review, writing: "While the first few episodes of the new Comeback make stingingly accurate points about the sexism and ageism Valerie has to contend with, The Comeback has its own problems. As in the first go-round, Valerie comes off as cartoonish, a caricature of a so-so celebrity." The last episode of Season 2, "Valerie Gets What She Really Wants", received almost universal praise, scoring 10/10 and A scores across the board.

==== Season 3 ====
The third and final season received critical acclaim. On the review aggregator website Rotten Tomatoes the third season received a 97% approval rating based on 35 critic reviews. The website's critics consensus reads: "Lisa Kudrow once again leads the illustrious Comeback with renewed vigor and purpose, remaining on the pulse of the media's current moment, marking a welcome and long-awaited victory lap." Metacritic calculated a weighted average score of 80 out of 100 based on 22 critics.

Jen Chaney of RogerEbert.com wrote, "In many ways, The Comeback comes across as both a love letter to and a eulogy for the television comedy. It can also be seen as a TV-focused complement to The Studio, Seth Rogen's Apple TV series about the insanity of working in the modern movie business, except The Comeback does an even better job of reflecting the panicky energy that has become the norm for anyone who makes a living in Los Angeles—or anywhere, for that matter—trying to tell stories." IndieWire's Ben Travers gave an A− for the season and wrote, "Concurrently an avowal of Hollywood's imminent collapse and a rebuttal to the doomerism that traps show business in a deleterious cycle of fear, The Comeback Season 3 regularly achieves what seems unachievable, which includes adding to the legacy of a classic." Variety's Alison Herman wrote, "The Comeback may look like a reality show, but at heart, it's a Hollywood fantasy that knows it's an endangered species."

== Awards and nominations ==
Season	Award	Category	Recipient(s)	Result	Ref.
Season 1	Primetime Emmy Awards	Outstanding Lead Actress in a Comedy Series	Lisa Kudrow	Nominated	
Season 1	Primetime Emmy Awards	Outstanding Directing for a Comedy Series	Michael Patrick King (for "Valerie Does Another Classic Leno")	Nominated	
Season 1	Primetime Emmy Awards	Outstanding Casting for a Comedy Series	Elizabeth Barnes, Meg Liberman, and Cami Patton	Nominated	
Season 1	Artios Awards	Best Television Pilot – Comedy	Meg Liberman and Cami Patton	Nominated	
Season 1	Gracie Awards	Outstanding Female Lead – Comedy Series	Lisa Kudrow	Won	
Season 1	Satellite Awards	Best Actress in a Series, Comedy or Musical	Lisa Kudrow	Nominated	
Season 2	Dorian Awards	TV Comedy of the Year	The Comeback	Nominated	
Season 2	Dorian Awards	TV Performance of the Year – Actress	Lisa Kudrow	Won	
Season 2	Critics' Choice Television Awards	Best Actress in a Comedy Series	Lisa Kudrow	Nominated	
Season 2	Primetime Emmy Awards	Outstanding Lead Actress in a Comedy Series	Lisa Kudrow	Nominated	
Season 3	Queerties Awards	Next Big Thing	The Comeback	Nominated	
Season 3	Astra TV Awards	Best Actress in a Comedy Series	Lisa Kudrow	Nominated	
Season 3	Astra TV Awards	Best Writing in a Comedy Series	The Comeback	Won	
Season 3	Dorian TV Awards	Best TV Comedy	The Comeback	Nominated	
Season 3	Dorian TV Awards	Best Written TV Show	The Comeback	Nominated	
Season 3	Dorian TV Awards	Best LGBTQ TV Show	The Comeback	Nominated	
Season 3	Dorian TV Awards	Best Campiest TV Show	The Comeback	Nominated	
Season 3	Dorian TV Awards	Best TV Performance – Comedy	Lisa Kudrow	Nominated	
Season 3	TCA Awards	Outstanding Achievement in Comedy	The Comeback	Nominated	
Season 3	TCA Awards	Program of the Year	The Comeback	Nominated	
Season 3	TCA Awards	Individual Achievement in Comedy	Lisa Kudrow	Nominated	
Season 3	Primetime Emmy Awards	Outstanding Lead Actress in a Comedy Series	Lisa Kudrow	Nominated	
Season 3	Primetime Emmy Awards	Outstanding Writing for a Comedy Series	Michael Patrick King and Lisa Kudrow (for "Valerie Does It All")	Nominated	

== Home media ==
=== DVD ===
"The Comeback – The Complete Only Season" was released on Region 1 DVD on August 1, 2006, with the Region 2 version released on September 18, 2006. The discs include all thirteen aired episodes as well as the following special features:

- Audio commentary on Episode 1 by Lisa Kudrow and Michael Patrick King
- Audio commentary on Episode 2 by Valerie Cherish
- Audio commentary on Episode 3 by Michael Patrick King
- Audio commentary on Episode 9 by Lisa Kudrow and Michael Patrick King
- Audio commentary on Episode 12 by Lisa Kudrow and Michael Patrick King
- Audio commentary on Episode 13 by Michael Patrick King
- "Valerie: After the Laughter" (8:47) is an epilogue for Valerie as she tries to explain what she'll be doing now that Room and Bored and The Comeback have been put on hiatus.
- "Valerie Backstage at Dancing with the Stars" (6:12) is the sitcom/reality star backstage at Dancing with the Stars
- Both discs also offer an episode index

Season 2 was released on DVD on August 4, 2015, in a combo-pack along with Season 1 entitled "The Comeback: Limited Series". It contains all 21 episodes of the series.

=== Streaming ===
As of May 2026, all seasons of The Comeback are available on HBO Max.
