= Dario Penne =

Italian actor and voice actor (1938–2023)

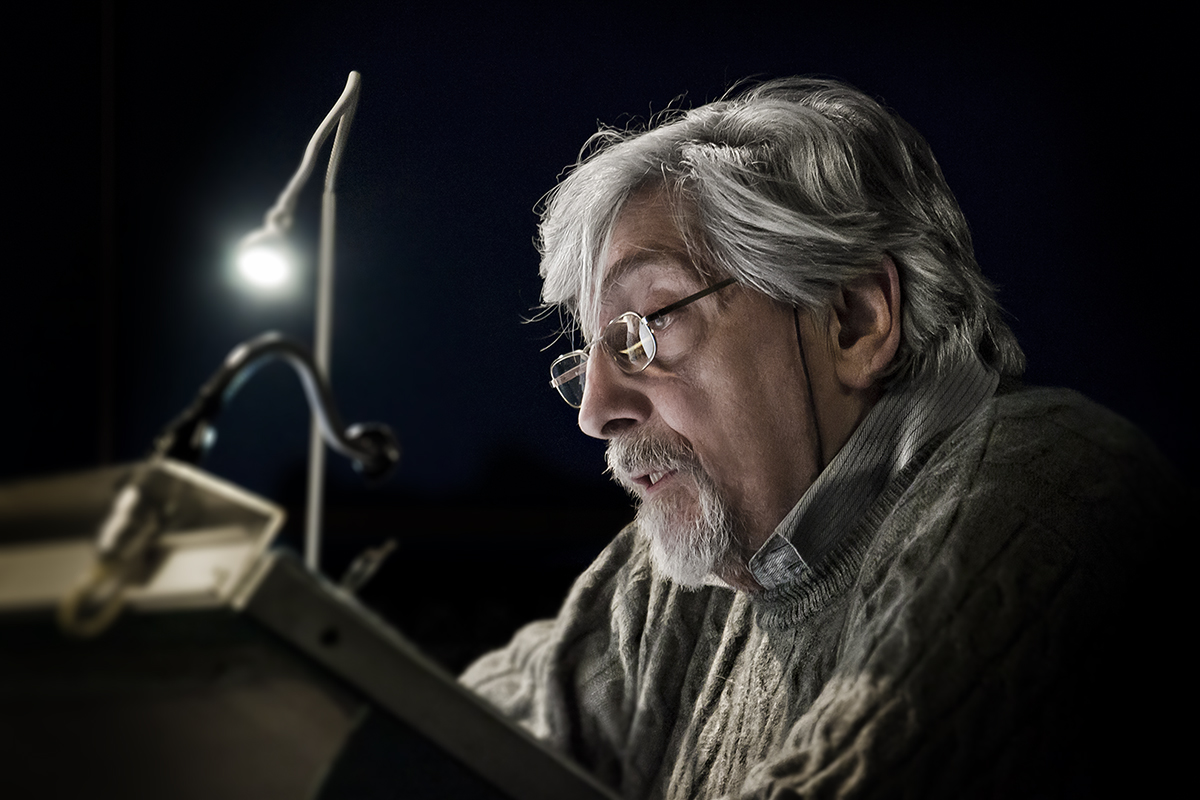
- Penne in 2013
- Born: 17 February 1938; Trieste, Italy
- Died: 15 February 2023 (aged 84); Rome, Italy
- Occupations: Actor; voice actor; dubbing director
- Years active: 1957–2023
- Spouse: Ivana Fedele

Dario Penne (17 February 1938 – 15 February 2023) was an Italian actor and voice actor.

== Biography ==
Born in Trieste, Penne acted in theatre, television, cinema and radio.

He was heavily active as a voice actor and dubbed many characters in Italian: among the most popular actors he dubbed include Michael Caine, Anthony Hopkins, Christopher Lloyd, Tommy Lee Jones and Ben Kingsley; one of the roles he remains best known for is the character Bender Bending Rodríguez in the Italian-language version of the animated series Futurama; he also dubbed Sentinel Prime in Transformers: Dark of the Moon and the narrator in the Goofy shorts Tomorrow We Diet and Teachers Are People.

== Death ==
Penne died in Rome on 15 February 2023, two days shy of his 85th birthday.

== Filmografia ==
=== Cinema ===
- Non ho tempo (1973)
- A Violent Life (1990)
- I Wanted Pants (1990)
- Blu notte (1992)
- The Border (1996)
- Ferrari (2003)

=== Televisione ===
- I promessi sposi - TV series (1967)
- Breve gloria di mister Miffin (1967)
- E le stelle stanno a guardare - TV miniseries (1971)
- Tecnica di un colpo di stato: la marcia su Roma (1978)
- L'eredità della priora - TV series (1980)
- Distretto di Polizia – TV series, 2 episodes (2003-2007)
- R.I.S. - Delitti imperfetti – TV series, season 1, episode 10 (2005)
- Pope John Paul I: The Smile of God – TV miniseries (2006)
- Don Matteo – TV series, season 6, episode 15 (2008)
- Un medico in famiglia – TV series, season 6, episode 18 (2009)
- Max e Hélène - TV film (2015)

== Voice work ==
=== Animation ===
- Ciro in L'uovo
- Prefect in Padre Pio
- Giamus in Gli Smile and Go e il braciere di fuoco
- School director in Pinocchio (2012 film)
- Grandpa in Mini Cuccioli - Le quattro stagioni
- Healer in Trash - La leggenda della piramide magica

=== Live action ===
- Giulio Andreotti's phone voice in some scenes of Giovanni Falcone
- Narrator in We Still Talk

=== Dubbing ===
==== Animation ====
- Bender and various voices in Futurama (seasons 1-7x13)
- Emmett "Doc" Brown, Reginald Barrington and Tommy Lee Jones in Family Guy
- Agent K in Men in Black: The Series
- Eduardo in Marsupilami
- Phillip Sherman in Finding Nemo
- Django in Ratatouille
- Finn McMissile in Cars 2
- Hovis in The Tale of Despereaux
- Pagemaster in The Pagemaster
- Tony in Alpha and Omega
- Herod in The Star
- Merlin in Sofia the First
- Grand Duke of Owls in Rock-a-Doodle
- Dr. Eggman in Sonic X
- Aristotle in Reign: The Conqueror
- Principal Pixiefrog in My Gym Partner's a Monkey
- Joe in A Christmas Carol
- Warden's Cat in The Animals of Farthing Wood
- King Mumbo Jumbo in ChalkZone
- Virgilius in Dante's Inferno: An Animated Epic
- Anthony Hopkins in The Simpsons

==== Live action ====
- Tim Comell in Desperate Hours
- Hannibal Lecter in The Silence of the Lambs, Hannibal, Red Dragon
- Odin in Thor, Thor: The Dark World, Thor: Ragnarok
- Alfred Pennyworth in Batman Begins, The Dark Knight, The Dark Knight Rises
- Agent K in Men in Black, Men in Black II, Men in Black 3
- Judge Doom in Who Framed Roger Rabbit
- Emmett "Doc" Brown in Back to the Future Part II, Back to the Future Part III, A Million Ways to Die in the West
- Nearly Headless Nick in Harry Potter and the Philosopher's Stone, Harry Potter and the Chamber of Secrets
- Samuel Gerard in The Fugitive, U.S. Marshals
- Sentinel Prime in Transformers: Dark of the Moon
- John Quincy Adams in Amistad
- James Stevens in The Remains of the Day
- C. S. Lewis in Shadowlands
- William Ludlow in Legends of the Fall
- Charles Morse in The Edge
- Don Diego de la Vega in The Mask of Zorro
- William Parrish in Meet Joe Black
- Dr. Ethan Powell in Instinct
- Titus Andronicus in Titus
- Mission Commander Swanbeck in Mission: Impossible 2
- Ted Brautigan in Hearts in Atlantis
- Officer Oakes in Bad Company
- Coleman Silk in The Human Stain
- Ptolemy I Soter in Alexander
- Robert in Proof
- Burt Munro in The World's Fastest Indian
- Judge Irwin in All the King's Men
- John in Bobby
- Theodore "Ted" Crawford in Fracture
- King Hrothgar in Beowulf
- Felix Bonhoeffer in Slipstream
- Sir John Talbot in The Wolfman
- Adam Gund in The City of Your Final Destination
- Alfie Shepridge in You Will Meet a Tall Dark Stranger
- Father Lucas Trevant in The Rite
- John in 360
- Dr. Edward Bailey in Red 2
- Methuselah in Noah
- Freddy Heineken in Kidnapping Mr. Heineken
- John Clancy in Solace
- Arthur Denning in Misconduct
- Hagen Kahl in Collide
- Sir Edmund Burton in Transformers: The Last Knight
- Robert Ford in Westworld
- Michael Jennings in On Deadly Ground
- Ray Say in Little Voice
- Dr. Wilbur Larch in The Cider House Rules
- Nigel Powers in Austin Powers in Goldmember
- Pierre Brossard in The Statement
- Robert Spritzel in The Weather Man
- Jasper in Children of Men
- Mr. Hobbs in Flawless
- Stephen Miles in Inception
- Matthew Morgan in Mr. Morgan's Last Love
- Professor Brand in Interstellar
- Arthur / Chester King in Kingsman: The Secret Service
- Fred Ballinger in Youth
- Father Dolan in The Last Witch Hunter
- Joe Harding in Going in Style
- John Neville in Eyes of Laura Mars
- Thomas Boyette in The Package
- Roy Foltrigg in The Client
- Henry Marshall in Blue Sky
- William Strannix in Under Siege
- Steve Butler in Heaven & Earth
- Hayes Lawrence Hodges II in Rules of Engagement
- Travis Lehman in Double Jeopardy
- L. T. Bonham in The Hunted
- Samuel Jones in The Missing
- Pete Perkins in The Three Burials of Melquiades Estrada
- Robert Stansfield in The Family
- Dr. Micah Franks in Criminal
- Robert Dewey in Jason Bourne
- Max Adams in Mechanic: Resurrection
- Bruno Daley in Why Me?
- Bill Burns in Eight Men Out
- Henry Sikorsky in The Dream Team
- Charlie Wilcox in Suburban Commando
- Switchblade Sam in Dennis the Menace
- Jimmy in Twenty Bucks
- Dennis Van Welker in Camp Nowhere
- Mr. Dewey in The Pagemaster
- Dr. Heep in Baby Geniuses
- Ray in Interstate 60
- Carl Goodman in Piranha 3D
- Cosmo in Sneakers
- Nicholas Templeton in Photographing Fairies
- Amos in The Assignment
- Don Logan in Sexy Beast
- Graydon in What Planet Are You From?
- Specialist in A.I. Artificial Intelligence
- Massoud Amir Behrani in House of Sand and Fog
- Grinko in Transsiberian
- Dr. Jeffrey Squires in The Wackness
- Dr. John Cawley in Shutter Island
- Georges Méliès in Hugo
- William Donohue in Eraser
- Charles Keating in The People vs. Larry Flynt
- Alan Rittenhouse in Deep Impact
- Joseph Campbell in The General's Daughter
- Priest in The Bachelor
- J. Robert Fowler in The Sum of All Fears
- Warden Hal Moores in The Green Mile
- George H. W. Bush in W.
- Ogden Phipps in Secretariat
- Sir Benjamin Lockwood in Jurassic World: Fallen Kingdom
- Prof. Edward Johnston in Timeline
- George Sibley in Six Feet Under
- Dr. Arthur Arden in American Horror Story: Asylum
- Thatcher Karsten in Betrayal
- Cardinal Michael Spencer in The Young Pope
- Walter Dean in Air Force One
- Lando Calrissian in Star Wars: Episode V – The Empire Strikes Back
- Khan Noonien Singh in Star Trek II: The Wrath of Khan
- Zefram Cochrane in Star Trek: First Contact
- Blain in Predator
- Dr. William Weir in Event Horizon
- Vito Cornelius in The Fifth Element
- Chief George Earle in Demolition Man
- Bill Rico in Starship Troopers
- Robert McKee in Adaptation
- Robert Crawford in Finding Forrester
- The Entity in Five Moons Square
- Shahid in The Stone Merchant
- Léon Sée in Carnera: The Walking Mountain
- Siniscalco Barozzi in Barbarossa
- Gregor in Dead Man Down
- Marco d'Aviano in The Day of the Siege: September Eleven 1683
- Braque in I Looked in Obituaries
- Dante Alter Ego in The Mystery of Dante
- Pekwarsky in Wanted
- Siegfried in Get Smart
- Terrence Bundley in Yes Man
- Thompson in The Adjustment Bureau
- Arthur Harris in Song for Marion
- John Canaday in Big Eyes
- Bruno Bischofberger in Basquiat
- Paul Kaufman in Land of the Dead
- John Canyon in Space Truckers
- King Koopa in Super Mario Bros.
- The Deacon in Waterworld
- Frank in Palermo Shooting
- Donald Greenleaf in Swing Vote
- Robert in The Comfort of Strangers
- Raimundo Tempio in The Funeral
- Raymond Perkins in Excess Baggage
- Umberto Bevalaqua in Illuminata
- Stanley Jacobellis in Gigli
- Nat Parker in Five Dollars a Day
- Hans Kieslowski in Seven Psychopaths
- Warren Sharp in Eddie the Eagle
- Pieter van Ruijven in Girl with a Pearl Earring
- James Manning in Separate Lies
- John Webster in Ripley Under Ground
- Sir Graham Dashwood in The Best Exotic Marigold Hotel
- Bolek in Polish Wedding
- D'Artagnan in The Man in the Iron Mask
- Satan in End of Days
- Charlie Miller in Shade
- Chorus in Henry V
- Probert in Gosford Park
- Derek Jacobi in Hereafter
- Narrator in Anonymous
- Owen Morshead in My Week with Marilyn
- Count Fernando D'Ailieres in Grace of Monaco
- Mr. Yaffe in Tomb Raider
- Harold Oxley in Indiana Jones and the Kingdom of the Crystal Skull
- Old Man in Immortals
- The Priest in Jackie
- Doctor Murnau in Kafka
- Baron Alphonse Frankenstein in Mary Shelley's Frankenstein
- Naville in A Life Less Ordinary
- Gideon Largeman in Garden State
- Simeon Weisz Lord of War
- Dan Wanamaker in What Women Want
- Owen Brewster in The Aviator
- Ralph Metz in Resurrecting the Champ
- Arthur Shaw in Tower Heist
- Ira Levinson The Longest Ride
- Samuel the Sheep in Charlotte's Web
- Ben Shockley in The Gauntlet
- Harry Callahan in The Dead Pool
- Frank Horrigan in In the Line of Fire
- Éamon de Valera in Michael Collins
- Lord Lionel Shabandar in Gambit
- Ronald Reagan in The Butler
- Louis XIV in A Little Chaos
- Albert "Burt" Grusinsky in We Own the Night
- Martin Cash in Jack Reacher
- Chris Bolton in In Dubious Battle
- Ben Lewin in It's My Turn
- Charlie in King of California
- Billy Gerson in Last Vegas
- Professor Dave Jennings in Animal House
- Bartholomew in The Pillars of the Earth
- Michel Dorn in Crossing Lines
- Drew Blakeley in The Dogs of War
- Bob Barnes in Platoon
- J. Paul Getty in All the Money in the World
- Deputy Kovacs in The Grand Budapest Hotel
- Count Dracula / Vlad the Impaler in Bram Stoker's Dracula
- Stepan in Eastern Promises
- The narrator in Our Planet
- Anthony in The Father

=== Video games ===
- Bender Bending Rodríguez in Futurama
- Alfred Pennyworth in Batman Begins
