= Mariangela Melato =

Italian actress (1941–2013)

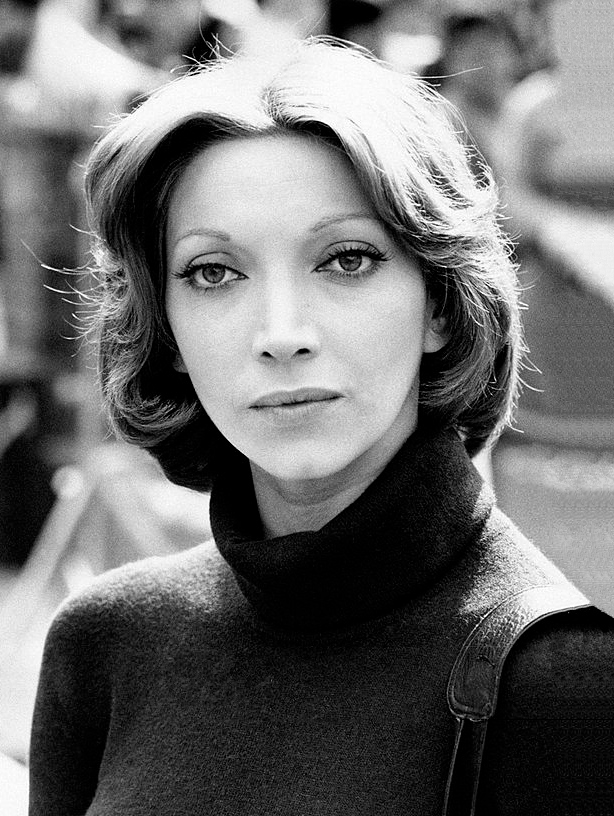
- Melato in Lo chiameremo Andrea (1972)
- Born: 19 September 1941; Milan, Kingdom of Italy
- Died: 11 January 2013 (aged 71); Rome, Italy
- Occupation: Actress
- Years active: 1963–2010
- Partner(s): Renzo Arbore (1970s–1980s, 2007–2013)

Mariangela Caterina Melato (Italian: [mariˈandʒela meˈlaːto, maˈrjan-]; 19 September 1941 – 11 January 2013), sometimes billed as Maria Angela Melato, was an Italian actress. She is most remembered for her roles in films of director Lina Wertmüller, including The Seduction of Mimi (1972), Love and Anarchy (1973), and Swept Away (1974). In cinema, she also appeared in films of Claude Chabrol, Elio Petri and Vittorio De Sica, and on stage in productions by Dario Fo, Luchino Visconti and Luca Ronconi. Her roles in English-language films include the 1980 science fiction film Flash Gordon, So Fine (1981) and Dancers (1987).

== Early life ==
Melato was born in Milan to Triestine traffic policeman Alfredo Melato and Milanese seamstress Lina. Her father, born Alfred Hönig, was originally of Austrian descent and later Italianised his name by translating its meaning of "honeyed". While still attending school, she worked as a window dresser, attended painting courses and enrolled at the Accademia dei Filodrammatici, studying acting under Esperia Sperani.

== Career ==
In the early 1960s, she entered the stage company of Fantasio Piccoli in Bolzano, giving her first performances in 1963 in plays like Binario cieco by Carlo Terron, Our Town by Thornton Wilder and O di uno o di niente by Luigi Pirandello. Upon her return to Milan, she worked with Dario Fo in Settimo: ruba un po' meno and La colpa è sempre del diavolo in 1964 and 1965. After her engagement with Fo's company ended, she left Milan again, working with directors such as Giuseppe Maffioli, Damiano Damiani and Giovanni Poli. In 1967, she appeared in Luchino Visconti's The Nun of Monza, but censors shut down the play. She worked with Visconti again in 1969 in The Advertisement by Natalia Ginzburg. The same and the following year, she starred in Ludovico Ariosto's Orlando Furioso and The Revenger's Tragedy, both directed by Luca Ronconi.

=== 1970s ===
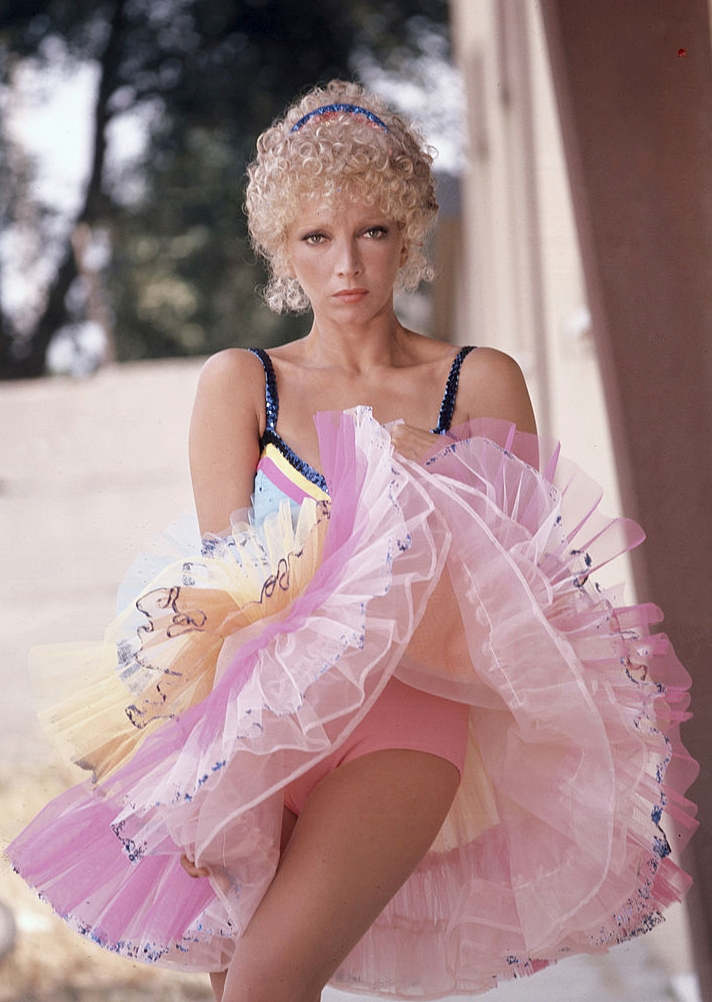
Melato in Di che segno sei? (1975)

In 1970, Melato moved to Rome and made her film debut in Pupi Avati's Thomas e gli indemoniati, which never saw a cinematic release. Subsequent roles followed in Nino Manfredi's Between Miracles (1971), Elio Petri's The Working Class Goes to Heaven (1971) and Vittorio De Sica's Lo chiameremo Andrea (1972).

In 1972, Melato starred alongside Giancarlo Giannini in The Seduction of Mimi, directed by Lina Wertmüller. For this film, she had to abandon Pietro Garinei's and Alessandro Giovannini's popular musical show Alleluja brava gente, which led to a dispute with the producers. The Seduction of Mimi was the start of a successful relationship between Wertmüller, Melato and Giannini that continued with Love and Anarchy (1973), in which Melato played a communist prostitute, and Swept Away (1974). Melato's critically acclaimed comedic performance in this film as a spoiled aristocrat is one of her internationally best-remembered roles.

For the remainder of the 1970s, Melato worked with some of Europe's most renowned directors, including Claude Chabrol in Nada (1974), Elio Petri in Todo modo (1976), and Luigi Comencini in Il gatto (1978). She also appeared on television, playing the role of Princess Bithiah in the miniseries Moses the Lawgiver, and in two episodes of the serialised TV adaptation of Ariosto's Orlando Furioso (both 1974). During the 1970s and 1980s, she only sporadically returned to the stage in productions like Aeschylus' Oresteia in 1972 and Carlo Bertolazzi's El nost Milan in 1979, the latter directed by Giorgio Strehler.

=== Later years ===
In the 1980s, Melato starred in two American productions, as the villainess General Kala in Flash Gordon and in the comedy So Fine (1981) alongside Ryan O'Neal. In the Pope's Eye (1980), directed by Renzo Arbore, was heavily attacked by the Catholic press and even seized from the cinemas. Melato and Lina Wertmüller eventually reunited for the filming of Summer Night (1986), a variation on Swept Away. Notable theatre appearances of this decade include Euripides' Medea (1986) and William Gibson's The Miracle Worker (1988), both directed by Giancarlo Sepe.

In the early 1990s, Melato returned permanently to the stage, reducing her presence on the screen and on television. She signed a long-term contract with the Teatro Stabile di Genova (now Teatro Nazionale di Genova), where she appeared in productions such as Karel Čapek's The Makropulos Affair (1993), Copi's Tango barbaro (1995) and Eugene O'Neill's Mourning Becomes Electra (1997). One of the rare film appearances during this time was the 1993 The End Is Known. Due to increasing health issues, she ended her career in 2010.

== Personal life and death ==
Melato had long-term relationships with actor and director Renzo Arbore and with musician and actor Giorgio Gaber.

She died from pancreatic cancer in Rome on 11 January 2013, at age 71.

== Selected filmography ==
- Thomas e gli indemoniati (1970) – Zoe
- Let's Have a Riot (1970)
- Invasion (1970) – Valentina
- Io non scappo... fuggo (1970)
- The Swinging Confessors (1970) – Prostitute
- Basta guardarla (1971) – Marisa do Sol
- Between Miracles (1971) – Maestrina
- The Working Class Goes to Heaven (1971) – Lidia
- Cometogether (1971)
- Incontro (1971)
- The Sicilian Checkmate (1972) – Rosaria Licata
- The Seduction of Mimi (1972) – Fiorella Meneghini
- Execution Squad (1972) – Sandra
- Lo chiameremo Andrea (1972) – Maria Antonazzi
- Il generale dorme in piedi (1972) – Lola Pigna
- Love and Anarchy (1973) – Salomè
- Nada (1974) – Veronique Cash
- Moses the Lawgiver (1974) – La fille du maire
- Policewoman (1974) – Giovanna 'Gianna' Abbastanzi
- Swept Away (1974) – Raffaella Pavone Lanzetti
- Par le sang des autres (1974)
- Faccia di spia (1975) – Tania
- Di che segno sei? (1975) – Marietta 'Claquette'
- The Guernica Tree (1975) – Vandale
- Eye of the Cat (1975) – Giulia
- Todo modo (1976) – Giacinta
- Caro Michele (1976) – Mara Castorelli
- Beach House (1977) – Giulia
- The Cat (1977) – Ofelia Pegoraro
- La presidentessa (1977) – Yvette Jolifleur
- Saxofone (1978) – Fiorenza
- To Forget Venice (1979) – Anna
- I giorni cantati (1979) – Angela
- Oggetti smarriti (1979) – Marta
- Flash Gordon (1980) – Kala
- In the Pope's Eye (1980) – Unchosen actress
- Help Me Dream (1981) – Francesca
- So Fine (1981) – Lira
- Tomorrow We Dance (1982) – Mariangela
- The Good Soldier (1982) – Marta
- My Darling, My Dearest (1982) – Armida
- Petomaniac (1983) – Catherine Dumurier
- Secrets Secrets (1985) – Giuliana, the judge
- My Dearest Son (1986) – Stefania
- Summer Night (1986) – Fulvia Bolk
- Dancers (1987) – Contessa
- Mortacci (1988) – Jolanda
- The End Is Known (1993) – Elena Malva
- Dirty Linen (1999) – Cinzia
- A Respectable Man (1999) – Anna Tortora
- Probably Love (2001) – Mariangela Melato
- Love Returns (2004) – Federica
- Vieni via con me (2005) – Maria Grande

== Awards (selected) ==
Melato received numerous stage and film awards.

David di Donatello Award:

- 1972: Special David
- 1975: David di Donatello for Best Actress for Policewoman
- 1977: David di Donatello for Best Actress for Caro Michele
- 1978: David di Donatello for Best Actress for The Cat
- 1981: David di Donatello for Best Actress for Help Me Dream
- 1984: Special Plaque

Nastro d'Argento Award for Best Leading Actress:

- 1972: The Working Class Goes to Heaven
- 1973: The Seduction of Mimi
- 1977: Caro Michele
- 1979: To Forget Venice
- 1981: Help Me Dream

== See also ==
- Anna Melato, actress and sister of Mariangela
