= Livia Giampalmo =

Italian actress

- Born: 14 October 1941 (age 84); Genoa, Italy
- Occupations: Actress; voice actress; director; screenwriter
- Years active: 1965–present
- Spouse: Giancarlo Giannini (m. 1967; div. 1975)
- Children: 2, including Adriano Giannini

Livia Giampalmo (born 14 October 1941) is an Italian actress, film director and screenwriter.

== Biography ==
Born in Genoa, Giampalmo began her career on television in 1965 and in 1972, she made her acting debut in the film The Seduction of Mimi directed by Lina Wertmüller, yet she has mostly been active as a screenwriter and director. She most notably directed the 2004 film Stay with Me which starred her son Adriano Giannini. She has also served as a screenwriter for the 1988 film The Gamble.

Giampalmo has also served as a voice actress. She has dubbed Diane Keaton and Jane Fonda in a select few of their films as well as Goldie Hawn, Anne Bancroft, Kathleen Turner and Shelley Winters. She notably dubbed Shelley Duvall in The Shining and Sigourney Weaver in Ghostbusters.

=== Personal life ===
From 1967 until 1975, Giampalmo was married to actor Giancarlo Giannini. They had two children including actor Adriano Giannini. Their eldest son Lorenzo died from an aneurysm in 1988. She has also dated actor Gino Lavagetto.

== Filmography ==
=== Cinema ===
==== As actor ====
- The Seduction of Mimi (1972)

==== As director and screenwriter ====
- Due volte vent'anni (1987)
- Evelina e i suoi figli (1990)
- My Daughter‘s Father (1997)
- Stay with Me (2004)

== Dubbing roles ==
=== Animation ===
- Sally Brown in Snoopy Come Home
- Girl in ChalkZone

=== Live action ===
- Wendy Torrance in The Shining
- Dana Barrett in Ghostbusters
- Luna Schlosser in Sleeper
- Mary Wilkie in Manhattan
- Sonja in Love and Death
- Annie Hall in Annie Hall
- Theresa Dunn in Looking for Mr. Goodbar
- Renata in Interiors
- Louise Bryant in Reds
- Faith Dunlap in Shoot the Moon
- Chelsea Thayer Wayne in On Golden Pond
- Alex Sternbergen in The Morning After
- Lillian Hellman in Julia
- Hannah Warren in California Suite
- Lee Winters in Rollover
- Ellen Gordon in Any Wednesday
- Toni Simmons in Cactus Flower
- Judy Benjamin in Private Benjamin
- Lou Jean Poplin in The Sugarland Express
- Consuella in Zardoz
- Dorrie in Stardust Memories
- Anna Bronski in To Be or Not to Be
- Joan Wilder in Romancing the Stone
- Joan Wilder in The Jewel of the Nile
- Peggy Ann Snow in Magic
- Valeria in Conan the Barbarian
- Queen Taramis in Conan the Destroyer
- Inga in Young Frankenstein
- Carla Moran in The Entity
- Rosa Amici in Earthquake
- Maria Elena in The Life and Times of Judge Roy Bean
- Kay Kirby in When Time Ran Out
- Anne Kimbrough in Piranha II: The Spawning
- Maggie Whelan in The Concorde ... Airport '79
- Mary Lewis in 10
