= Lonely Planet (film) =

2024 film by Susannah Grant

- Release poster
- Directed by: Susannah Grant
- Written by: Susannah Grant
- Produced by: Liza Chasin; Susannah Grant; Sarah Timberman
- Starring: Laura Dern; Liam Hemsworth; Diana Silvers; Younès Boucif; Adriano Giannini; Rachida Brakni
- Cinematography: Ben Smithard
- Edited by: Kevin Tent
- Music by: Pinar Toprak
- Production company: 3dot Productions
- Distributed by: Netflix
- Release date: October 11, 2024
- Running time: 96 minutes
- Country: United States
- Language: English

Lonely Planet is a 2024 American romantic drama film written and directed by Susannah Grant. It stars Laura Dern and Liam Hemsworth.

The plot centers around a successful female novelist who finds love with an unlikely person in an exotic place.

The film was released on Netflix on October 11, 2024.

== Plot ==
Highly successful writer Katherine Loewe travels to a writer's retreat in an exotic Moroccan mountain resort to finish her latest novel. Though normally prolific, she finds herself struggling after breaking up with her sculptor partner, who wants her to move out of his idyllic farmhouse after living together for fourteen years.

Other guests include the insecure and much younger Lily Kemp, whose debut novel has received critical and financial success. She has asked her finance manager boyfriend Owen Brophy to accompany her.

While Katherine only wants a quiet place to write, Lily enjoys the sociability and attention she receives from the other writers. Rafih Abdo especially is a fan of hers, who urges her to take advantage of the retreat. Owen, meanwhile, finds it difficult to fit in and is distracted by his demanding job, for which he must to take frequent high-pressure phone calls about a US real-estate deal.

When the taps in Katherine's room stop working, she gets lost while searching for drinking water. Katherine then meets Owen, who helps her find her way back to her room.

The following day, Lily and the other writers opt to stay at the resort to speak to a reporter, while Owen and Katherine take a pre-planned excursion to a local town. They spend the afternoon together sharing insights and observations about travel. Their taxi breaks down on the way back, so they are treated by a local family to a home-cooked dinner and recreation, which they both enjoy, despite the inconvenience.

Upon returning, Owen is disappointed that Lily has been using alcohol and hashish with the other writers so refuses to have sex with her. When he tells her he has spent the day with Katherine, Lily is immediately envious and feels rejected.

Over the next several days, Katherine finds a small utility room to work in and Owen sightsees with Lily, who invites Rafih along as Owen takes repeated business calls. Though Owen attempts to make Lily happy by supporting her, she nonetheless publicly humiliates him during an evening game of charades, mocking him for his lack of literary knowledge.

Katherine meets with Owen afterwards, lifting his spirits by discussing his past successes in sports and commiserating at the difficulty of his job. He, in turn, shares his admiration of her long list of accomplishments, confessing that he "Googled" her, and they spend the evening sharing personal details.

After Owen contracts food poisoning, Lily leaves him for an overnight excursion into the Sahara. Katherine tells him that her sculptor partner broke up with her because he finds her unbearable while she is writing. Owen encourages her, saying he appreciates her insight and self-discovery in her process.

After returning, Lily's drinking and drug use increase, leading her to stumble home several nights, half-naked and high. After a heated argument, Owen drinks heavily and makes a pass at Katherine, which she gently rebuffs, citing their age difference, which he finds insulting.

The following morning, Lily attempts to reconcile with Owen, but is caught by a photo texted by Rafih, revealing they have been sleeping together. Owen leaves her, finding Katherine and inviting her to join him on a road trip.

As Katherine and Owen travel together, they become intimate. He reveals he has quit his job, which he has increasingly found morally compromising. During a trip to a local beach, they both talk about living in Morocco together. However, they are interrupted when Katherine's laptop, containing the only copy of her novel, is stolen. Having lost two years' worth of work and angry with herself, she is inconsolable, calling Owen a “distraction”, and departs immediately for NYC.

Several months later, Katherine finishes a different novel, which becomes another success when published the following summer. Coincidentally, Owen runs into her at a downtown bar, greeting her warmly before leaving with his friends.

Katherine runs after Owen, confessing she had tried to find him several times but lacked the courage to follow through. She apologizes for that, and for calling him a distraction. She also tells him her new book was inspired by their encounter and that she used her writing to keep him in mind. Owen kisses her.

== Cast ==
- Laura Dern as Katherine Loewe
- Liam Hemsworth as Owen Brophy
- Diana Silvers as Lily Kemp
- Younès Boucif as Rafih Abdo
- Adriano Giannini as Ugo Jaconelli
- Rachida Brakni as Fatema Benzakour

== Reception ==
On the review aggregator website Rotten Tomatoes, 39% of 46 critics' reviews are positive, with an average rating of 5.1/10. The website's consensus reads: "Lonely Planet coasts by on the gravitational pull of its charming stars and setting, but a lack of real heat keeps this romantic drama curiously uninvolving." Metacritic, which uses a weighted average, assigned the film a score of 46 out of 100, based on 17 critics, indicating "mixed or average" reviews.
