= Love and Anarchy =

1973 film by Lina Wertmüller

- Theatrical release poster
- Italian: Film d'amore e d'anarchia, ovvero: stamattina alle 10, in via dei Fiori, nella nota casa di tolleranza...
- Directed by: Lina Wertmüller
- Written by: Lina Wertmüller
- Produced by: Romano Cardarelli
- Starring: Giancarlo Giannini; Mariangela Melato; Eros Pagni; Pina Cei; Elena Fiore; Lina Polito
- Cinematography: Giuseppe Rotunno
- Edited by: Franco Fraticelli
- Music by: Nino Rota; Carlo Savina
- Production companies: Euro International Films; Labrador Films
- Distributed by: Euro International Films (Italy)
- Release dates: 22 February 1973 (Italy); January 1976 (France)
- Running time: 120 minutes
- Countries: Italy; France
- Language: Italian

Love and Anarchy (Italian: Film d'amore e d'anarchia, ovvero: stamattina alle 10, in via dei Fiori, nella nota casa di tolleranza..., lit. 'Film of Love and Anarchy, or Rather: This Morning at 10, in Via dei Fiori, in the Well-Known Brothel...') is a 1973 political comedy-drama film written and directed by Lina Wertmüller and starring Giancarlo Giannini and Mariangela Melato.

Set in Fascist Italy in the early 1930s, the film follows Tunin (Giannini), an anarchist farmer who stays in a brothel in Rome while preparing to assassinate Benito Mussolini with assistance from Salomè (Melato), a prostitute and fellow anarchist. However, his mission is complicated when he becomes romantically involved with Tripolina (Lina Polito), another prostitute at the brothel. The film explores the depths of his emotions concerning love, his hate for fascism, and his fears of being killed while assassinating Mussolini.

At the 1973 Cannes Film Festival, Love and Anarchy was nominated for the Palme d'Or and Giannini was awarded Best Actor.

== Plot ==
In 1932, after witnessing the murder of his anarchist friend at the hands of the Fascist police for plotting to assassinate Benito Mussolini, Antonio "Tunin" Soffiantini, a peasant farmer from northern Italy, resolves to carry out his friend's mission. After training in marksmanship in Paris with the anarchist underground, he travels to Rome and settles into Madame Aida's brothel while posing as the cousin of one of the prostitutes, Salomè, who is his secret political contact. Salomè explains to Tunin that she seeks to avenge the lynching of her anarchist lover, Anteo Zamboni, who was framed for an attempt on Mussolini's life in Bologna.

Salomè arranges for her, Tunin and Tripolina, a younger prostitute at the brothel, to spend the day with the head of Mussolini's secret police, Giacinto Spatoletti, from whom she has been extracting vital information for the past three months, so they can learn Spatoletti's upcoming security arrangements. The four of them go to the countryside near Rome where the assassination is due to take place in a few days' time. Salomè keeps Spatoletti busy while Tunin surveys the area and devises a plan. After striking up a conversation, Tunin and Tripolina develop feelings for one another and subsequently sleep together.

Back in Rome that night, Salomè and Tripolina return to the brothel while Spatoletti takes Tunin to the Piazza del Campidoglio, where the two men drink as Spatoletti expresses his admiration for Mussolini and his disdain for socialists and anarchists. When Spatoletti makes crude remarks about Tripolina, Tunin admonishes him and runs towards the brothel, yelling Tripolina's name, but the madams throw him out.

The next day, Tunin reveals his assassination plot to Tripolina and asks her to spend the next two days with him, as he fears they may be his last, leaving her devastated. When an important client dies suddenly at the brothel, Madame Aida, hoping to avoid a scandal, assigns Tunin to discreetly dump the client's corpse in the Roman Forum, which he does with help from Salomè. In exchange, Madame Aida allows Tripolina to spend the next two days with Tunin.

On the morning of the planned assassination, Tripolina refuses to awaken Tunin, fearing he will die, which leads to a heated argument with Salomè, who insists that he execute the plan, but the two eventually agree to protect him. Tunin awakens and, realising he is late, angrily accuses both women of betrayal. When the police conduct a routine patrol at the brothel, an increasingly paranoid Tunin confesses his intention to kill Mussolini and opens fire on the police, killing a few officers. He then tries to shoot himself but has run out of bullets. While attempting to escape, he is apprehended outside the brothel as Salomè, Tripolina and the other prostitutes watch in horror.

Tunin is subjected to torture and interrogation by Spatoletti, but refuses to speak. He is subsequently beaten to death by Fascist officers in his jail cell. The police report describes his death as an "unidentified madman's" suicide.

== Cast ==
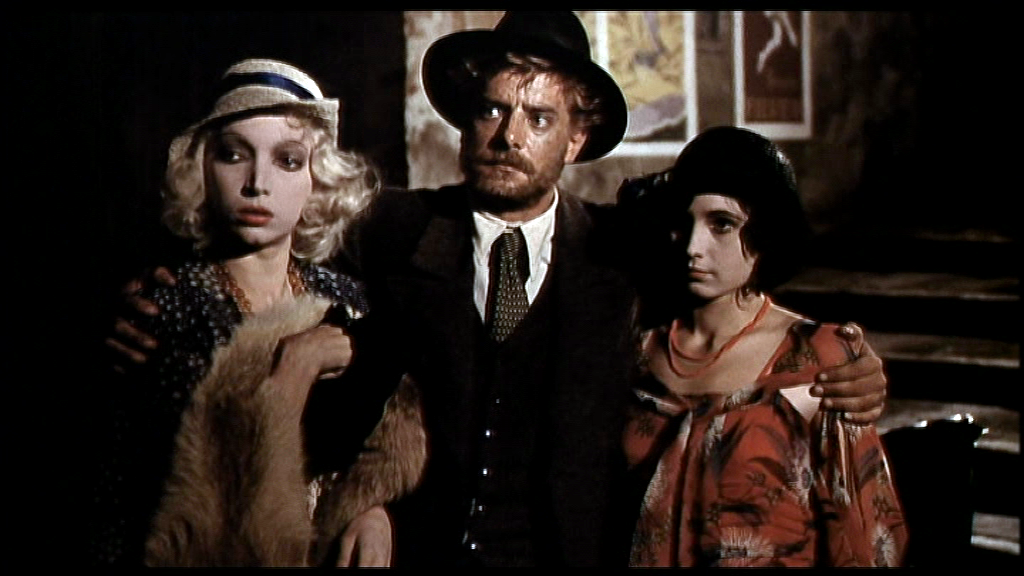
Mariangela Melato, Giancarlo Giannini and Lina Polito in Love and Anarchy

- Giancarlo Giannini as Antonio Soffiantini, a.k.a. "Tunin"
- Mariangela Melato as Salomè
- Eros Pagni as Giacinto Spatoletti
- Pina Cei as Madame Aida
- Elena Fiore as Donna Carmela
- Giuliana Calandra
- Isa Bellini as Zoraide
- Isa Danieli as a prostitute
- Enrica Bonaccorti as a prostitute
- Anna Bonaiuto as a prostitute
- Anita Branzanti as a prostitute
- Maria Sciacca as a prostitute
- Anna Melato as a prostitute
- Gea Linchi as a prostitute
- Anna Stivala as a prostitute
- Roberto Herlitzka as Pautasso
- Lina Polito as Tripolina

== Production notes ==
Giancarlo Giannini starred in three other films Wertmuller made during this period: The Seduction of Mimi, Swept Away, and Seven Beauties.

== Reception ==
Writing for the New York Times, A.H. Weller praised the film as a "solidly professional work", writing that Wertmuller's direction and Giuseppe Rotunno's cinematography had given the story's vignettes "substance and color that underline the irony and tragedy of unrequited sacrifice."

== English version ==
For the initial American release, editor Fima Noveck created a prologue which featured a montage of photos of Mussolini, along with a crawl explaining his rise to power and the violent activities sanctioned in his name during his reign. Also, in this edit, the full Italian title is not displayed, in favor of the abbreviated English title Love and Anarchy.
