= Lo chiameremo Andrea =

1972 film

- Film poster
- Directed by: Vittorio De Sica
- Written by: Leonardo Benvenuti; Piero De Bernardi; Cesare Zavattini
- Produced by: Marina Cicogna; Arthur Cohn
- Starring: Nino Manfredi
- Cinematography: Ennio Guarnieri
- Edited by: Adriana Novelli
- Music by: Manuel De Sica
- Release date: 14 October 1972
- Running time: 100 minutes
- Country: Italy
- Language: Italian

Lo chiameremo Andrea (also known as We'll Call Him Andrew) is a 1972 Italian comedy film directed by Vittorio De Sica.

== Plot ==
The story is of Nino Manfredi as Paolo Antonazzi and Mariangela Melato as Maria Antonazzi, teachers at the same school who although they love each other, are childless.

== Cast ==
- Nino Manfredi as Paolo Antonazzi
- Mariangela Melato as Maria Antonazzi
- Antonino Faà di Bruno as Schoolmaster (as Antonino Di Bruno)
- Herbert Tiede as Sexologist
- Solveig D'Assunta as Nino's mother
- Isa Miranda as Teacher
- Esmeralda Ruspoli as Teacher
- Giulio Baraghini as Mariani
- Sandro Dori as Mr. Parini
- Maria Pia Casilio as Bruna Parini
- Guido Cerniglia as Arturo Soriani
- Violetta Chiarini as Mafalda Soriani
- Donato Di Sepio as Carlo Alberto Spadacci
- Lino Patruno as Teacher
- Anna Maria Aragona as Teacher
- Enzo Monteduro as Teacher
- Luigi Antonio Guerra as Janitor

== Production ==
Principal cinematography started on February 1972. The production was marred by clashes between De Sica and Nino Manfredi.

== Reception ==
The film was a major hit, grossing 1,9 billion lire at the Italian box office.
