= In the Pope's Eye =

- Directed by: Renzo Arbore
- Written by: Renzo Arbore; Luciano De Crescenzo
- Produced by: Mario Orfini; Emilio Bolles
- Starring: Renzo Arbore; Roberto Benigni
- Cinematography: Luciano Tovoli
- Music by: Renzo Arbore
- Release date: 1980
- Running time: 110 min (original cut): 98 min (home video cut)
- Country: Italy
- Language: Italian

In the Pope's Eye (Italian: Il pap'occhio) is a 1980 Italian comedy film written and directed by Renzo Arbore.

It was released in September 1980, and it was heavily attacked by the Catholic press. Three weeks later it was confiscated "for insulting the Catholic religion and the person of the Holy Pope" on the orders of the L'Aquila prosecutor Donato Massimo Bartolomei.

The film grossed 5 billion lire being the 5th best grossing film in Italy in the 1980/1981 season.

== Plot ==
Musician Renzo Arbore has a vision of Don Gabriel, who comes bringing an Annunciation from the Vatican: Gabriel announces that Pope John Paul II, watching television, was impressed by a beer commercial in which Arbore was the spokesman. Arbore is thus to be hired as the artistic director of the newly-formed but poorly organized Vatican State Television. Following this announcement, Arbore and his company arrive at the Vatican to begin work. Meanwhile, Cardinal Richelieu, a bigoted conservative prelate, plots to destroy the initiative and ruin Arbore.

== Cast ==
- Renzo Arbore as Himself
- Roberto Benigni as Himself
- Isabella Rossellini as Herself
- Andy Luotto as Himself
- Mario Marenco as Himself
- Manfred Freyberger as Pope John Paul II
- Michael Pergolani as Himself
- Otto e Barnelli as Themselves
- Sorelle Bandiera as Themselves
- Diego Abatantuono as Don Gabriele
- Luciano De Crescenzo as God
- Graziano Giusti as Cardinal Richelieu
- Fabrizio Zampa as Zampa
- Milly Carlucci as TV Announcing Nun
- Mariangela Melato as Unchosen actress who plays "The Daughter of Iorio"
- Ruggero Orlando as Himself
- Martin Scorsese as TV Director
- Silvia Annichiarico as Arbore's Secretary
