= I criminali della metropoli =

- Directed by: Gino Mangini
- Written by: Gino Mangini
- Starring: Tony Kendall; Dorian Gray
- Cinematography: Guglielmo Mancori
- Music by: Aldo Piga
- Distributed by: Geos
- Release date: 1965
- Country: Italy
- Language: Italian

I criminali della metropoli (a.k.a. Fango sulla metropoli) is a 1965 Italian crime film written and directed by "Henry Wilson" (Gino Mangini).

== Cast ==
- Tony Kendall as Sgt. Perier
- Dorian Gray as Denise
- Vassili Karis as Pierre (credited as Marco Vassilli)
- Greta Polyn as Zizi
- Enzo Tarascio as Brigadiere Lemaire
- Maddalena Gillia as Annette
- Germano Longo as Henry Delange (credited as James Harridon)
- Giancarlo Giannini as Gerard Lemaire
- Silla Bettini as Chabrol
- Roger Beaumont as Inspector Blanchard
- Claudio Biava as Alfred
- Calisto Calisti as René Baron
- Angelo Dessy as Victor Leduc
- Attilio Dottesio as Jordan
- Gianni Solaro as Chief Inspector Brasseur
- Nino Marchetti
