= I Love You Eugenio =

2002 film

- Directed by: Francisco José Fernandez
- Starring: Giancarlo Giannini
- Cinematography: Luciano Tovoli
- Music by: Silvio Amato; Umberto Smaila
- Release date: 2002
- Country: Italy
- Language: Italian

Ti voglio bene Eugenio (internationally released as I Love You Eugenio) is a 2002 Italian drama film directed by Francisco José Fernandez. For this film Giancarlo Giannini was awarded a David di Donatello for Best Actor.

== Cast ==
- Giancarlo Giannini: Eugenio
- Giuliana De Sio: Elena
- Arnoldo Foà: Prof. Bonelli
- Jacques Perrin: Federico
- Riccardo Garrone: Maresciallo
