= Judas' Gospel (film) =

2025 film by Giulio Base

- English-language poster
- Italian: Il Vangelo di Giuda
- Directed by: Giulio Base
- Screenplay by: Giulio Base
- Story by: Giulio Base
- Produced by: Tiziana Rocca; Gianluca Curti; Santo Versace
- Starring: Giancarlo Giannini; Rupert Everett; Tomasz Kot; Paz Vega; Abel Ferrara; Vincenzo Galluzzo; Ada Roncone; Darko Perić; John Savage
- Cinematography: Giuseppe Riccobene
- Edited by: Micaela Natascia Di Vito
- Music by: Checco Pallone
- Production companies: Agnus Dei Production; Minerva Pictures; Agresywna Banda; Rai Cinema
- Distributed by: Minerva Pictures; Plus Films KFT; Malusa Consulting; Beta Film
- Release date: 11 August 2025 (Locarno)
- Running time: 93 minutes
- Countries: Italy; Poland
- Languages: English; Italian; Spanish

Judas' Gospel (Italian: Il Vangelo di Giuda) is a 2025 religious drama film written and directed by Giulio Base. It premiered out of competition at the 78th Locarno Film Festival on 11 August 2025.

== Cast ==
- Giancarlo Giannini as Judas
- Rupert Everett as Caiaphas
- Tomasz Kot as Simon
- Paz Vega as Mary
- Abel Ferrara as Herod
- Vincenzo Galluzzo as Jesus
- Ada Roncone
- Darko Perić as Peter
- John Savage as Joseph

== Production ==
Principal photography began in July 2024. The film was shot in Calabria, specifically in Curinga, Corigliano-Rossano, Cleto, Cosenza, Mendicino, Caccuri, and the Sila National Park.

== Release ==
In September 2024, Plus Films KFT acquired the Latin American distribution rights to the film. In 2025, the film was acquired for distribution by Malusa Consulting in Romania and Beta Film in Bulgaria. The film is set to premiere out of competition at the 78th Locarno Film Festival in August 2025.
