= Sergio Di Stefano =

Italian voice actor (1939–2010)

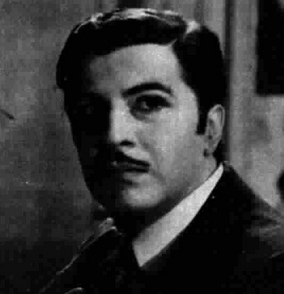
- Di Stefano in 1973
- Born: 5 July 1939; Rome, Italy
- Died: 17 September 2010 (aged 71); Rome, Italy
- Occupations: Actor; voice actor; dubbing director
- Years active: 1963–2010

Sergio Di Stefano (5 July 1939 – 17 September 2010) was an Italian actor and voice actor.

== Biography ==
In the 1960s, Di Stefano attended the Silvio d'Amico National Academy of Dramatic Arts and began his acting career on stage and on television. In 1970, he contributed voice acting work to Pino Zac's animated feature film based on Italo Calvino's The Nonexistent Knight, while the following year he played the role of Jack Reedy in the television miniseries E le stelle stanno a guardare. During the same period he also began a career as a voice dubbing artist and became well known for giving his voice to actors like John Malkovich, Jeff Bridges, Alan Rickman, William Hurt and especially Hugh Laurie as Gregory House in the first six seasons of House and Jonathan Frakes as William Riker in Star Trek: The Next Generation.

Di Stefano was also noted for dubbing Christopher Lambert, Christopher Reeve, Alec Baldwin, Jeff Goldblum and Robert Englund in some of their performances. In his animated roles, he gave his voice to characters in several Italian dubbed anime productions. Additionally, he voiced Johnny Bravo in the Italian dub of Johnny Bravo as well as Barkis Bittern in the Italian dub of Corpse Bride and Dr. Cockroach in the Italian dub of Monsters vs Aliens.

== Death ==
Di Stefano died of a heart attack on 17 September 2010 at the age of 71. After his death, his colleague Luca Biagini became the new voice dubber of Hugh Laurie in the remaining seasons of House.

== Filmography ==
Year	Title	Role	Notes
1963	La maschera e la grazia	Choir	TV film
1970	Il cavaliere inesistente (film)	Voice	Live-action animation film
1971	E le stelle stanno a guardare	Jack Reedy	TV miniseries
1972	La ragazza con le efelidi	Aleksey Nikolaich Petrov	TV film
1973	Non ho tempo		Film
1973	Maman Colibrì	George De Chambry	TV play
1982	Il tifoso, l'arbitro e il calciatore	Fiorentina-Juventus commentator (voice)	Comedy film
1982	Gian Burrasca	Narrator (voice)	Comedy film, final scene
1983	The World of Don Camillo	Narrator (voice)	Comedy film
2006	Padre Pio	Padre Pio (voice)	Animated film
2007	Magic Sport 2	Snip the moose (voice)	Animated series
2008	Monsters & Pirates	Professor Montego (voice)	Animated series

=== Dubbing ===
==== Films (Animation, Italian dub) ====
Year	Title	Role(s)	Ref
1982	The Secret of NIMH	Justin	
1983	The Twelve Tasks of Asterix	Roman Ghost	
1983	The Twelve Tasks of Asterix	Prefect (1983 dubbing)	
2001	Jimmy Neutron: Boy Genius	King Goobot V	
2002	Eight Crazy Nights	Tom Baltezor	
2003	Tokyo Godfathers	Hana	
2005	Corpse Bride	Lord Barkis Bittern	
2005	Valiant	Wing Commander Gutsy	
2009	Monsters vs. Aliens	Dr. Cockroach	

==== Films (Live action, Italian dub) ====
Year	Title	Role(s)	Original actor	Ref
1967	Monkeys, Go Home!	Hank Dussard	Dean Jones	
1971	A Gunfight	Young Gunfighter	Keith Carradine	
1972	Fuzz	Detective Carella	Burt Reynolds	
1976	Stay Hungry	Craig Blake	Jeff Bridges	
1976	Buffalo Bill and the Indians, or Sitting Bull's History Lesson	Ed Goodman	Harvey Keitel	
1980	Saturn 3	Captain Benson	Harvey Keitel	
1980	The Long Riders	Sam Starr	James Remar	
1980	My Wife is a Witch	Asmodeus	Helmut Berger	
1981	An Eye for an Eye	Captain Stevens	Richard Roundtree	
1983	Never Say Never Again	Maximillian Largo	Klaus Maria Brandauer	
1983	Scarface	Alejandro Sosa	Paul Shenar	
1984	Starman	Scott Hayden / Star Man	Jeff Bridges	
1984	The Natural	Bartholomew "Bump" Bailey	Michael Madsen	
1984	Greystoke: The Legend of Tarzan, Lord of the Apes	John "Jack" Clayton	Paul Geoffrey	
1984	The River	Joe Wade	Scott Glenn	
1984	The Bostonians	Basil Ransom	Christopher Reeve	
1985	Jagged Edge	Jack Forrester	Jeff Bridges	
1985	American Flyers	Marcus Sommers	Kevin Costner	
1985	A View to a Kill	Max Zorin	Christopher Walken	
1985	Subway	Fred	Christopher Lambert	
1985	Plenty	Raymond Brock	Charles Dance	
1985	The Goonies	Elgin Perkins	Curt Hanson	
1985	The Good Father	Bill Hooper	Anthony Hopkins	
1985	Out of Africa	Baron Bror von Blixen	Klaus Maria Brandauer	
1985	Silverado	Slick	Jeff Goldblum	
1986	The Inquiry	Titus Valerius Taurus	Keith Carradine	
1986	No Mercy	Paul Deveneux	Terry Kinney	
1986	Highlander	Connor MacLeod	Christopher Lambert	
1986	Gung Ho	Hunt Stevenson	Michael Keaton	
1986	The American Bride	Edoardo	Thommy Berggren	
1986	The Name of the Rose	Severinus	Elya Baskin	
1986	Friday the 13th Part VI: Jason Lives	Martin	Bob Larkin	
1987	A Nightmare on Elm Street 3: Dream Warriors	Dr. Neil Gordon	Craig Wasson	
1987	Making Mr. Right	Dr. Jeff Peters / Ulysses	John Malkovich	
1987	Street Smart	Jonathan Fisher	Christopher Reeve	
1987	Superman IV: The Quest for Peace	Clark Kent / Superman	Christopher Reeve	
1987	The Untouchables	Eliot Ness	Kevin Costner	
1987	RoboCop	Bob Morton	Miguel Ferrer	
1987	Opera	Marco	Ian Charleson	
1987	The Family	Young Carlo	Andrea Occhipinti	
1988	Johnny Be Good	Chief Elkans	Marshall Bell	
1988	Twins	Mr. Webster	Marshall Bell	
1988	To Kill a Priest	Father Alek	Christopher Lambert	
1988	Rain Man	Mr. Kelso	Ray Baker	
1988	Bull Durham	Lawrence "Crash" Davis	Kevin Costner	
1988	Burning Secret	Baron Alexander von Hauenstein	Klaus Maria Brandauer	
1988	Frantic	The Kidnapper	Yorgo Voyagis	
1988	School Daze	Leeds	Samuel L. Jackson	
1988	Friday the 13th Part VII: The New Blood	Dr. Chris Crews	Terry Kiser	
1989	Sea of Love	Detective Gruber	Richard Jenkins	
1989	A Nightmare on Elm Street 4: The Dream Master	Freddy Krueger	Robert Englund	
1989	Field of Dreams	Ray Kinsella	Kevin Costner	
1989	See You in the Morning	Larry Livingstone	Jeff Bridges	
1989	The Cook, the Thief, His Wife & Her Lover	Richard Boarst	Richard Bohringer	
1989	Bloodhounds of Broadway	"The Brain"	Rutger Hauer	
1989	Look Who's Talking	Albert	George Segal	
1989	The Package	Glen Whitacre	John Heard	
1989	Friday the 13th Part VIII: Jason Takes Manhattan	Charles McCulloch	Peter Mark Richman	
1990	The Hunt for Red October	Vasily Borodin	Sam Neill	
1990	The Russia House	Dante / Yakov Saveleyev	Klaus Maria Brandauer	
1990	Arachnophobia	Milt Briggs	James Handy	
1990	Heart Condition	Harry Zara	Ray Baker	
1990	Total Recall	Bob McClane	Ray Baker	
1991	The Fisher King	Jack Lucas	Jeff Bridges	
1991	Freddy's Dead: The Final Nightmare	Freddy Krueger	Robert Englund	
1991	Backdraft	Alderman Martin Swayzak	J. T. Walsh	
1991	Highlander II: The Quickening	Connor MacLeod	Christopher Lambert	
1991	Bugsy	Meyer Lansky	Ben Kingsley	
1991	Oscar	Overton	William Atherton	
1992	Deep Cover	David Jason	Jeff Goldblum	
1992	Shooting Elizabeth	Howard Pigeon	Jeff Goldblum	
1992	Patriot Games	Lord Holmes	James Fox	
1992	Knight Moves	Peter Sanderson	Christopher Lambert	
1992	Fortress	John Henry Brennick	Christopher Lambert	
1993	The Remains of the Day	Jack Lewis	Christopher Reeve	
1993	Look Who's Talking Now!	Albert	George Segal	
1993	In the Line of Fire	Mitch Leary	John Malkovich	
1993	RoboCop 3	Paul McDaggett	John Castle	
1994	Gunmen	Dani Servigo	Christopher Lambert	
1994	Interview with the Vampire	Santiago	Stephen Rea	
1994	Andre	Harry Whitney	Keith Carradine	
1994	Star Trek Generations	William Riker	Jonathan Frakes	
1994	Quiz Show	Jack Barry	Christopher McDonald	
1994	Wes Craven's New Nightmare	Freddy Krueger	Robert Englund	
1994	Clear and Present Danger	Judge Moore	Dean Jones	
1994	Camp Nowhere	Norris Prescott	Ray Baker	
1994	Mixed Nuts	Chris	Liev Schreiber	
1995	Roadflower	Jack Lerolland	Christopher Lambert	
1995	Mortal Kombat	Lord Rayden	Christopher Lambert	
1995	First Knight	Malagant	Ben Cross	
1995	Sense and Sensibility	Colonel Brandon	Alan Rickman	
1995	Hideaway	Hatch Harrison	Jeff Goldblum	
1995	The Mangler	William "Bill" Gartley	Robert Englund	
1995	Two Bits	Narrator	Alec Baldwin	
1995	Nixon	H. R. Haldeman	James Woods	
1996	The Mirror Has Two Faces	Gregory Larkin	Jeff Bridges	
1996	Adrenalin: Fear the Rush	Officer Lemieux	Christopher Lambert	
1996	Marching in Darkness	Silvio Roatta	Jean-Marc Barr	
1996	Up Close & Personal	Rob Sullivan	Scott Bryce	
1996	The Juror	Boezman	Todd Susman	
1996	Twelfth Night	Feste	Ben Kingsley	
1996	Sleepers	Rob Carlson	John Slattery	
1996	Mulholland Falls	Timms	John Malkovich	
1996	Mary Reilly	Dr. Henry Jekyll / Edward Hyde	John Malkovich	
1996	The Ogre	Abel Tiffauges	John Malkovich	
1996	Star Trek: First Contact	William Riker	Jonathan Frakes	
1996	Barb Wire	Alexander Willis	Xander Berkeley	
1996	Space Truckers	Dr. Nabel / Captain Macanudo	Charles Dance	
1996	First Kid	President Paul Davenport	James Naughton	
1997	Mortal Kombat Annihilation	Rayden	James Remar	
1997	The Edge	Bob Green	Alec Baldwin	
1997	Swept from the Sea	Dr. James Kennedy	Ian McKellen	
1997	Air Force One	Agent Gibbs	Xander Berkeley	
1997	Anaconda	Warren Westridge	Jonathan Hyde	
1997	In & Out	Peter Malloy	Tom Selleck	
1997	Home Alone 3	Peter Beaupre	Aleksander Krupa	
1997	Arlette	Frank Martin	Christopher Lambert	
1997	Executive Target	Nick James	Michael Madsen	
1997	George of the Jungle	Arthur Stanhope	John Bennett Perry	
1998	Star Trek: Insurrection	William Riker	Jonathan Frakes	
1998	The Man in the Iron Mask	Athos	John Malkovich	
1998	Rounders	Teddy "KGB"	John Malkovich	
1998	The Horse Whisperer	Robert MacLean	Sam Neill	
1998	The Big Lebowski	Jeffrey "The Dude" Lebowski	Jeff Bridges	
1998	Dark City	Frank Bumstead	William Hurt	
1998	Deep Impact	Theo Van Sertema	Derek de Lint	
1998	Desperate Measures	Peter J. McCabe	Michael Keaton	
1998	Out of Sight	Ray Nicolette	Michael Keaton	
1998	Phantoms	Stu Wargle	Liev Schreiber	
1999	The Boondock Saints	Paul Smecker	Willem Dafoe	
1999	The Muse	Jack Warrick	Jeff Bridges	
1999	The Messenger: The Story of Joan of Arc	Charles VII of France	John Malkovich	
1999	Girl on the Bridge	Gabor	Daniel Auteuil	
1999	The End of the Affair	Henry Miles	Stephen Rea	
1999	Beowulf	Beowulf	Christopher Lambert	
1999	Resurrection	Det. John Prudhomme	Christopher Lambert	
1999	Gideon	Gideon Oliver Dobbs	Christopher Lambert	
1999	Bicentennial Man	Richard Martin	Sam Neill	
1999	Dogma	Metatron	Alan Rickman	
1999	Crazy in Alabama	Harry Hall	Robert Wagner	
2000	Shadow of the Vampire	Frederich Wilhelm Murnau	John Malkovich	
2000	The Contender	President Jackson Evans	Jeff Bridges	
2000	Thirteen Days	Kenneth O'Donnell	Kevin Costner	
2000	The Guilty	Callum Crane	Bill Pullman	
2000	Highlander: Endgame	Connor MacLeod	Christopher Lambert	
2000	Fortress 2: Re-Entry	John Henry Brennick	Christopher Lambert	
2000	The Perfect Storm	Todd Gross	Christopher McDonald	
2000	American Psycho	Donald Kimball	Willem Dafoe	
2000	Animal Factory	Earl Copen	Willem Dafoe	
2000	The Widow of Saint-Pierre	The Captain	Daniel Auteuil	
2000	Here on Earth	Sheriff Earl Cavanaugh	Bruce Greenwood	
2000	The Patriot	Colonel William Tavington	Jason Isaacs	
2001	Perfume	Jamie	Jeff Goldblum	
2001	A.I. Artificial Intelligence	Professor Allen Hobby	William Hurt	
2001	The Royal Tenenbaums	Narrator	Alec Baldwin	
2001	Pearl Harbor	Jimmy Doolittle	Alec Baldwin	
2001	The Closet	François Pignon	Daniel Auteuil	
2001	Vajont	Alberico Biadene	Daniel Auteuil	
2001	Cats & Dogs	Professor Charles Brody	Jeff Goldblum	
2001	What's the Worst That Could Happen?	Alex Tardio	William Fichtner	
2002	Dragonfly	Dr. Joe Darrow	Kevin Costner	
2002	Changing Lanes	Sponsor	William Hurt	
2002	Ripley's Game	Tom Ripley	John Malkovich	
2002	Adaptation	John Malkovich	John Malkovich	
2002	Tuck Everlasting	Angus Tuck	William Hurt	
2002	Confessions of a Dangerous Mind	Keeler	Rutger Hauer	
2002	Equilibrium	Father	Sean Pertwee	
2002	Austin Powers in Goldmember	Number 2	Robert Wagner	
2002	Auto Focus	John Henry Carpenter	Willem Dafoe	
2002	Star Trek: Nemesis	William Riker	Jonathan Frakes	
2002	Stealing Harvard	Emmett Cook	Richard Jenkins	
2002	John Q.	Dr. Raymond Turner	James Woods	
2002	The Ring	Innkeeper	Richard Lineback	
2002	Panic Room	Evan Kurlander	Ian Buchanan	
2003	Seabiscuit	Charles S. Howard	Jeff Bridges	
2003	Johnny English	Pascal Sauvage	John Malkovich	
2003	The Rundown	Cornelius Bernard Hatcher	Christopher Walken	
2003	Freaky Friday	Ryan	Mark Harmon	
2003	Underworld	Kraven	Shane Brolly	
2003	The Core	Robert "Bob" Iverson	Bruce Greenwood	
2004	The Beautiful Country	Captain Oh	Tim Roth	
2004	The Punisher	Quentin Glass	Will Patton	
2004	The Last Shot	Joe Devine	Alec Baldwin	
2004	The Village	Edward Walker	William Hurt	
2004	Resident Evil: Apocalypse	Dr. Alexander Isaacs	Iain Glen	
2004	A Good Woman	Tuppy	Tom Wilkinson	
2005	The Hitchhiker's Guide to the Galaxy	Marvin	Alan Rickman	
2005	Syriana	Stan	William Hurt	
2005	Stories of Lost Souls	Jeff Goldblum	Jeff Goldblum	
2005	Broken Flowers	Ron Anderson	Christopher McDonald	
2005	Capote	Jack Dunphy	Bruce Greenwood	
2005	Asylum	Dr. Peter Cleave	Ian McKellen	
2005	The Cutter	Lieutenant Moore	Marshall Teague	
2005	Edison	Brian Tilman	John Heard	
2005	Today You Die	Harlan Banks	Steven Seagal	
2005	The Legend of Zorro	Padre Quintero	Tony Amendola	
2005	Missing	U.S. Ambassador (2005 redub)	Richard Venture	
2006	Minotaur	Cyrnan	Rutger Hauer	
2006	Stick It	Burt Vickerman	Jeff Bridges	
2006	Poseidon	Robert Ramsey	Kurt Russell	
2006	The Good Shepherd	Philip Allen	William Hurt	
2006	When a Stranger Calls	Dr. Mandrakis	Derek de Lint	
2006	Alien Autopsy	Morgan Banner	Bill Pullman	
2006	Colour Me Kubrick	Alan Conway	John Malkovich	
2006	Perfume: The Story of a Murderer	Antoine Richis	Alan Rickman	
2006	Black Snake Moan	Lazarus Redd	Samuel L. Jackson	
2006	The Devil Wears Prada	Richard Sachs	David Marshall Grant	
2007	The Death and Life of Bobby Z	Johnson	Keith Carradine	
2007	Resident Evil: Extinction	Dr. Alexander Isaacs	Iain Glen	
2007	Underdog	Dan Unger	Jim Belushi	
2007	12	2nd Juror	Nikita Mikhalkov	
2007	Nobel Son	Eli Michaelson	Alan Rickman	
2007	Mr. Brooks	Earl Brooks	Kevin Costner	
2007	The Godfather	Emilio Barzini (2007 redub)	Richard Conte	
2008	Street Kings	Jimmy Biggs	Hugh Laurie	
2008	Milk	George Moscone	Victor Garber	
2008	W.	Donald Rumsfeld	Scott Glenn	
2009	Fanboys	Big Chuck	Christopher McDonald	
2009	Crazy Heart	Otis "Bad" Blake	Jeff Bridges	
2009	The Boondock Saints II: All Saints Day	Paul Smecker	Willem Dafoe	
2009	Star Trek	Sarek	Ben Cross	
2009	My Sister's Keeper	Campbell Alexander	Alec Baldwin	
2009	Bandslam	David Bowie	David Bowie	
2009	Whatever Works	Joe	Michael McKean	
2010	The Ghost Writer	Paul Emmett	Tom Wilkinson	
2010	Alice in Wonderland	Absolem	Alan Rickman	

==== Television (Animation, Italian dub) ====
Year	Title	Role(s)	Notes	Ref
1968–1975	The Flintstones	Barney Rubble	Main cast (seasons 2–3)	
1980–1986	Scooby-Doo and Scrappy-Doo	Shaggy Rogers	Main cast	
1993–1994	Space Pirate Captain Harlock	Doctor Zero	1990s manga edition	
1998	Getter Robo Armageddon	Hayato Jin	1st edition	
1998	Sorcerous Stabber Orphen	Childman Powderfield	Main cast (1st edition)	
1998–2000	Cow and Chicken	Dad	Recurring role	
1998–2004	Johnny Bravo	Johnny Bravo	Main cast	
1999–2000	I Am Weasel	Dad	Recurring role (seasons 2–4)	
2000–2001	Shin Getter Robo vs Neo Getter Robo	Hayato Jin	Main cast	
2000–2001	The Vision of Escaflowne	Folken Fanel	Recurring role	
2000–2006	South Park	Randy Marsh	1 episode (season 1, episode 2)	
2000–2006	South Park	God	1st voice	
2000–2006	South Park	Various characters	Recurring role (seasons 1–4)	
2001	The 13 Ghosts of Scooby-Doo	Vincent Van Ghoul	Main cast (2001 dubbing)	
2001	Harlock Saga	Captain Harlock	Main cast	
2006	Serial Experiments Lain	Yasuo Iwakura	Main cast (2000s dubbing)	
2006	Jane and the Dragon	King Caradoc	Recurring role	
2006–2007	Zombie Hotel	Rictus	Main cast	
2006, 2010	Family Guy	Frank Sinatra Jr.	2 episodes	
2009	Monsters vs. Aliens: Mutant Pumpkins from Outer Space	Dr. Cockroach	TV film	
2009–2010	Star Wars: The Clone Wars	Plo Koon	Recurring role (seasons 1–2)	

==== Television (Live action, Italian dub) ====
Year	Title	Role(s)	Notes	Original actor	Ref
1987–1994	Star Trek: The Next Generation	William Riker	Main cast	Jonathan Frakes	
1988	The Fortunate Pilgrim	Frank Corbo	TV miniseries	Edward James Olmos	
1990	The Phantom of the Opera	Erik	TV miniseries	Charles Dance	
1992	In the Deep Woods	Eric Gaines	TV film	Will Patton	
1993	Heart of Darkness	Mr. Kurtz	TV film	John Malkovich	
1993	Fallen Angels	Dwight Billings	1 episode	Alan Rickman	
1993–1998	Freddy's Nightmares	Freddy Krueger	Main cast (VHS edition)	Robert Englund	
1994	Royce	Gribbon	TV film	Miguel Ferrer	
1996–2003	Friends	Dr. Richard Burke	10 episodes	Tom Selleck	
1996–2003	Friends	Parker	2 episodes	Alec Baldwin	
1996–2003	Friends	Leonard Hayes	1 episode	Jeff Goldblum	
1997–2007	Stargate SG-1	Jack O'Neill	Main cast	Richard Dean Anderson	
2000	Enslavement: The True Story of Fanny Kemble	Pierce Butler	TV film	Keith Carradine	
2002	Blood Crime	Morgan McKenna	TV film	James Caan	
2002	Napoléon	Charles Talleyrand	TV miniseries	John Malkovich	
2004	Saint John Bosco: Mission to Love	Marquis Clementi	TV miniseries	Charles Dance	
2004–2006	Stargate Atlantis	Jack O'Neill	4 episodes	Richard Dean Anderson	
2004–2010	House	Gregory House	Main cast (seasons 1–6)	Hugh Laurie	
2005	Star Trek: Enterprise	William Riker	1 episode	Jonathan Frakes	
2005	Dalida	Richard Chanfray	TV film	Christopher Lambert	
2006	The Sopranos	Ben Kingsley	1 episode	Ben Kingsley	
2007	High School Musical 2	Vance Evans	TV film	Robert Curtis Brown	
2009	A Dog Year	Jon Katz	TV film	Jeff Bridges	
2009–2010	Stargate Universe	Jack O'Neill	6 episodes	Richard Dean Anderson	

==== Video games (Italian dub) ====
Year	Title	Role(s)	Ref
2010	Alice in Wonderland	Absolem	
