= Elena Fiore =

Italian film actress (1914–1983)

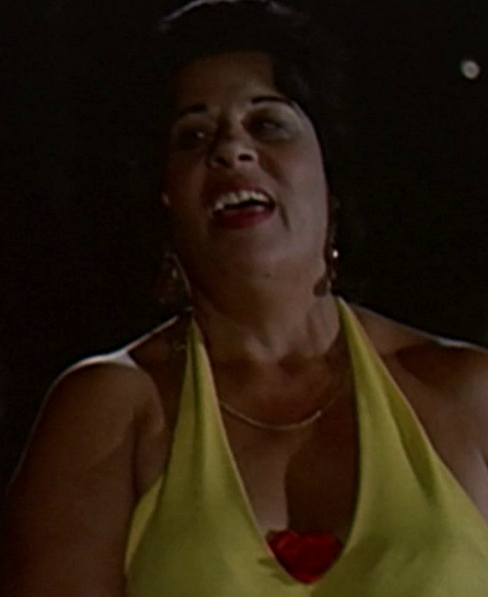
- Fiore in the movie I sette magnifici cornuti (1974)
- Born: 29 April 1914; Torre Annunziata, Naples, Italy
- Died: 1 February 1983 (aged 68); Torre Annunziata, Naples, Italy
- Occupation: Actress

Elena Fiore (29 July 1914 – 1 February 1983) was an Italian film actress, best known for her roles in Lina Wertmüller's films.

== Life and career ==
Born in Torre Annunziata, Naples, Fiore debuted in 1972 in the role of Amalia Finocchiaro, an overweight, middle-aged woman full of sexual desires, in Wertmuller's The Seduction of Mimi. After similar roles in, among others, Love and Anarchy, Seven Beauties, Neapolitan Mystery and The Marquis of Grillo she retired from acting in the early 1980s. Fiore died in Torre Annunziata on 1 February 1983, at the age of 68.
