= Luca Biagini =

Italian actor and voice actor

- Born: 3 October 1949 (age 76); Ville di Corsano, Italy
- Occupations: Actor; voice actor
- Years active: 1979–present

Luca Biagini (born 3 October 1949) is an Italian actor and voice actor.

== Biography ==
Involved with theatre, cinema and television since the 1970s, he is also known for dubbing over the voices of actors such as Hugo Weaving in The Lord of the Rings film series, Michael Keaton in Batman and Spotlight, Arliss Howard in Full Metal Jacket, J.K. Simmons in Whiplash, Bruce Willis in 12 Monkeys, Ed Harris in The Hours, Colin Firth, John Malkovich and Kevin Kline in most of their performances. In 2010, he became the new Italian voice dubber for Hugh Laurie's Dr. House in House, after the death of his former dubber Sergio Di Stefano.

He also dubbed animated characters such as Tigger from Winnie the Pooh since 1999, Sebastian St. Clair in BoJack Horseman, Jake from The Rescuers Down Under and the Rat from Fantastic Mr. Fox.

== Filmography ==
=== Films ===
Year	Title	Role(s)	Notes
1977	Sahara Cross	Louis	
1980	Sbamm		
1981	Teste di quoio		
1982	Vai avanti tu che mi vien da ridere		
1997	Il più lungo giorno	Giovanni Campana	
1999	Un anno in campagna	Il conte	
2003	The Cruelest Day	General Carmine Fiore	
2004	Ecuba	Talthybius	
2006	Zeldman	Craig Meisel / Narrator	
2006	Per non dimenticarti	Vito	
2011	Women vs. Men	Ringo	Episode "Beatles"
2012	Voci in nero	The Announcer	Documentary
2013	Bologna 2 agosto... I giorni della collera	Prof. Massimo Salera	
2013	Un'insolita vendemmia	Gabriele	
2017	Metti una notte	Comandante Cafieri	
2019	La vacanza	Arturo	

=== Television ===
Year	Title	Role(s)	Notes
1966	Il conte di Montecristo	Quarto marinaio	TV miniseries
1967	La fiera della vanità	Alfiere Stubble	TV miniseries
1972	I demoni	Satov	TV miniseries
1974	Un certo Marconi	Sid Ross	TV film
1975	Processo per l'uccisione di Raffaele Sonzogno giornalista romano	Giuseppe Luciani	TV miniseries
1979	Il signore di Ballantrae	Henry Durie	TV miniseries
1979	Il delitto Notarbartolo	Marchesano	TV miniseries
1980	L'eredità della priora	Andrea Guarna	TV miniseries
1980	Delitto in piazza	Mario Aldara	TV miniseries
1997	Caro maestro	Gianni Vivaldi	TV series
1998–1999	Una donna per amico	Professor Conti	TV series
1999	Il mistero del cortile	Carenzi	TV miniseries
2000	Il rumore dei ricordi	Giorgio	TV miniseries
2002	The Angel's House	Franco Manetti	TV film
2002	Lo zio d'America	Riccardo	TV series
2012	Il caso Enzo Tortora - Dove eravamo rimasti?	Dall'Ora	TV miniseries
2013	Adriano Olivetti - La forza di un sogno		TV miniseries
2013	La Madonna del Parto	Bishop	TV documentary
2015	Solo per amore	Giovanni Fiore	TV series
2022	Sopravvissuti	Armando Leone	TV series

== Voice work ==
- Diderot in Lucky and Zorba - Animated film (1998)
- Narrator in Kiss Me Lorena (2005), L'amore al tempo del precariato - TV series (2015)
- Alain-Fournier in Zodiaco - Il libro perduto (2012) - TV miniseries
- Riccardo Corsaris in Gorlach: The Legend of Cordelia (2016) - Medium-length film
- Voice-over in Mirabile visione: Inferno - documentary (2022)

=== Dubbing roles ===
==== Animation ====
- Elton John, Declan Desmond (episode 18.13), Steve Mobbs, Moe's Bar Rag and Victor Kleskow in The Simpsons
- Jake in The Rescuers Down Under
- Tigger in Winnie the Pooh (since 1999)
- Kent Mansley in The Iron Giant
- Rameses II in The Prince of Egypt
- Principal Shepherd (season 13+), Jonathan, Rod Serling and Bill Murray in Family Guy
- Mark Griff in Stanley
- Clair in BoJack Horseman
- Qwerty in VeggieTales
- Percy Polie in Rolie Polie Olie
- Darth Vader in Star Wars Rebels
- Arty Smartypants in Between the Lions
- Whitey in Flushed Away
- Jack the Dog in Bear in the Big Blue House
- Marlin in Exploring the Reef
- Ray Liotta in Bee Movie
- Henry the Green Engine Thomas and the Magic Railroad
- Andy in Tomodachi Life: The TV Series
- Papa Q. Bear in The Berenstain Bears
- The Wicked King in Sarah Lee Jones and the Magic Village
- Zartog in Space Chimps
- Jack in Blue's Clues
- Papu in Oobi
- Andre in The Tale of Despereaux
- Rat in Fantastic Mr. Fox
- Grimble in Legend of the Guardians: The Owls of Ga'Hoole
- Clyde in Wreck-It Ralph
- Prince John in Tom and Jerry: Robin Hood and His Merry Mouse
- Leonardo da Vinci in Mr. Peabody and Sherman

==== Live action ====
- Bruce Wayne/Batman in Batman, The Flash
- Atticus Finch in To Kill a Mockingbird (1999 redub)
- Gregory House in House (seasons 7–8)
- Elrond in The Lord of the Rings
- Walter V. Robinson in Spotlight
- Private/Sergeant Cowboy in Full Metal Jacket
- Terence Fletcher in Whiplash
- James Cole in 12 Monkeys
- Richard "Richie" Brown in The Hours
- Wally the Great in The Wiggles Movie
- Geoffrey Clifton in The English Patient
- Harry Hart / Galahad in Kingsman: The Secret Service
- Cyrus Grissom in Con Air
- John Malkovich in Being John Malkovich
- Humma Kavula in The Hitchhiker's Guide to the Galaxy
- Galbatorix in Eragon
- Osbourne Cox in Burn After Reading
- Lucien Laurin in Secretariat
- Quentin Turnbull in Jonah Hex
- Marvin Boggs in Red
- Donald Vidrine in Deepwater Horizon
- Dave Kovic / Bill Mitchell in Dave
- Alvin in No Strings Attached
- Quintus in Fallout
- Beetlejuice in Beetlejuice Beetlejuice
