= Todo modo =

1976 Italian film

- Film poster
- Directed by: Elio Petri
- Screenplay by: Berto Pelosso; Elio Petri
- Based on: Todo modo; by Leonardo Sciascia
- Produced by: Daniele Senatore
- Starring: Gian Maria Volonté; Marcello Mastroianni; Mariangela Melato
- Cinematography: Luigi Kuveiller
- Edited by: Ruggero Mastroianni
- Music by: Ennio Morricone
- Production company: Cinevera
- Distributed by: PIC
- Release dates: 30 April 1976 (Italy); 13 April 2015 (Italy, re-release)
- Running time: 130 minutes
- Country: Italy
- Language: Italian

Todo modo (lit. "By all means"), (Note: The title refers to Ignatius de Loyola's quotation "Todo modo para buscar la voluntad divina", English translation "Use all means in the search for the divine will".) also known in English as One Way or Another, is a 1976 Italian satirical political drama film directed by Elio Petri starring Gian Maria Volonté and Marcello Mastroianni. It is loosely based on the novel of the same name by Leonardo Sciascia.

== Plot ==
During a mysterious epidemic in Italy, numerous political leaders, industrialists, bankers, and business leaders of the ruling party, the Christian Democracy (Italy), arrive in a hotel called Zafer. With the party's central figure, president M., in their midst, they have gathered for an annual three-day retreat, inspired by the Spiritual Exercises of Ignatius of Loyola. The retreat acts as an atonement for their past crimes of corruption and unethical practices, and a renewal of the party's structure, leaders, and interests in order to maintain power in the country. The religious exercises are practiced under the guidance of priest Don Gaetano, who dominates all those at the retreat. Over the course of the next three days, one by one the leading figures of the party fall victim to a murder series, despite investigations by the police. In the last scene, M., the sole survivor of the party, walks through the terrain outside of the hotel, where the corpses of the murdered have been piled up. Reciting Loyola's spiritual exercises, he asks his chauffeur to kill him.

== Cast ==
- Gian Maria Volonté as M. (The President)
- Marcello Mastroianni as Don Gaetano
- Mariangela Melato as Giacinta, M.'s wife
- Ciccio Ingrassia as Voltrano
- Franco Citti as M.'s chauffeur
- Tino Scotti as the cook
- Renato Salvatori as Dr. Scalambri, the judge
- Michel Piccoli as He
- Cesare Gelli as Arras, Vice Commissioner
- Adriano Amidei Migliano as Hon. Capra Porfiri
- Guerrino Crivello as television speaker

== Background and themes ==
Filmed during the Years of Lead and following Investigation of a Citizen Above Suspicion (1970) and The Working Class Goes to Heaven (1971), Todo Modo, inspired by the novel of the same title by Leonardo Sciascia, is often described as a grotesque farce. Its claustrophobic feel, owing to the film largely taking place in an underground brutalist building resembling a prison, serves to create a parody of the political-managerial class of the Christian Democrats.

Petri biographers Federico Bacci, Nicola Guarneri and Stefano Leone write that the film is a portrait of the "deviant" mental structure of the Christian Democrats. It is an allegorical and expressionistic critique of political corruption and the greed for power.

== Production ==
I also forced Sciascia's hands in the tone of the film (...), and it seemed to me, not only to follow an indication from Sciascia (...), but to evoke that climate of very black farce that was breathed and continues still breathing in Italy.

— Elio Petri (1979)

Volonté's character, "M." (who was not in Sciascia's book but invented by Petri) was modeled after Aldo Moro, the prime minister of Italy at the time. As Elio Petri wrote in his diary, Volonté was so dedicated to his role that he took on the movements and intonation of Moro throughout the filming. Petri noted that the first two days of filming had to be scrapped by mutual agreement because the resemblance between the two "was embarrassing, it was stomach-churning".

The soundtrack was initially entrusted to Charles Mingus. Petri decided to discard Mingus' music after, in the initial editing phase, Renzo Arbore, Mariangela Melato's partner, listened to the soundtrack. Arbore claimed that the score was a "dump", that it was material discarded by Mingus from previous works and recycled for the occasion, and that it did not suit the atmosphere of the film. Petri at that point decided to ask Ennio Morricone who, within a few days, provided him with a score inspired by the compositions of Olivier Messiaen, as he himself requested.

== Release and reception ==
Todo modo met with much controversy during its initial screenings. It was released during the fifth Moro government, a period marked by the emerging discussion of a compromise between Christian Democrats and the PCI. Petri argued that, as a result of this, communists largely criticised and shunned the film in public discourse, while praising him in private.

The film marked the end of the Petri-Volontè partnership and Warner Communications decided not to release it in the United States, despite the Petri-Senatore duo's previous success with Investigation of a Citizen Above Suspicion.

In his review for L'espresso, Alberto Moravia argued that the film was driven solely by its "hatred against the ruling group currently in power in Italy". Leonardo Sciascia, author of the novel which the film was based on, defended Petri's adaptation, stating, "Todo modo is a Pasolini film, in the sense that the trial that Pasolini wanted and was unable to bring against the Christian Democratic ruling class is now done by Petri. And it is a process that sounds like an execution... There is no better Christian Democracy that distinguishes itself from the worst one, a Moro that distinguishes himself as better than a Fanfani. There is only one Christian Democracy with which the Italian people must decide radically come to terms." Two years later, after the Red Brigades' assassination of Aldo Moro, the film, depending on the source, was either withdrawn from screening or outright banned.

In 2014, the film, restored by the Cineteca di Bologna and the National Museum of Cinema, Turin, was presented at the 71st Venice International Film Festival. It saw a theatrical re-release the following year. The original film reel is currently missing.

== Awards ==
- Globo d'oro for Best Actor (Marcello Mastroianni)
- Globo d'oro for Best Actress (Mariangela Melato)
- Nastro d'argento for Best Supporting Actor (Ciccio Ingrassia)
