= Anna Miserocchi =

Italian actress

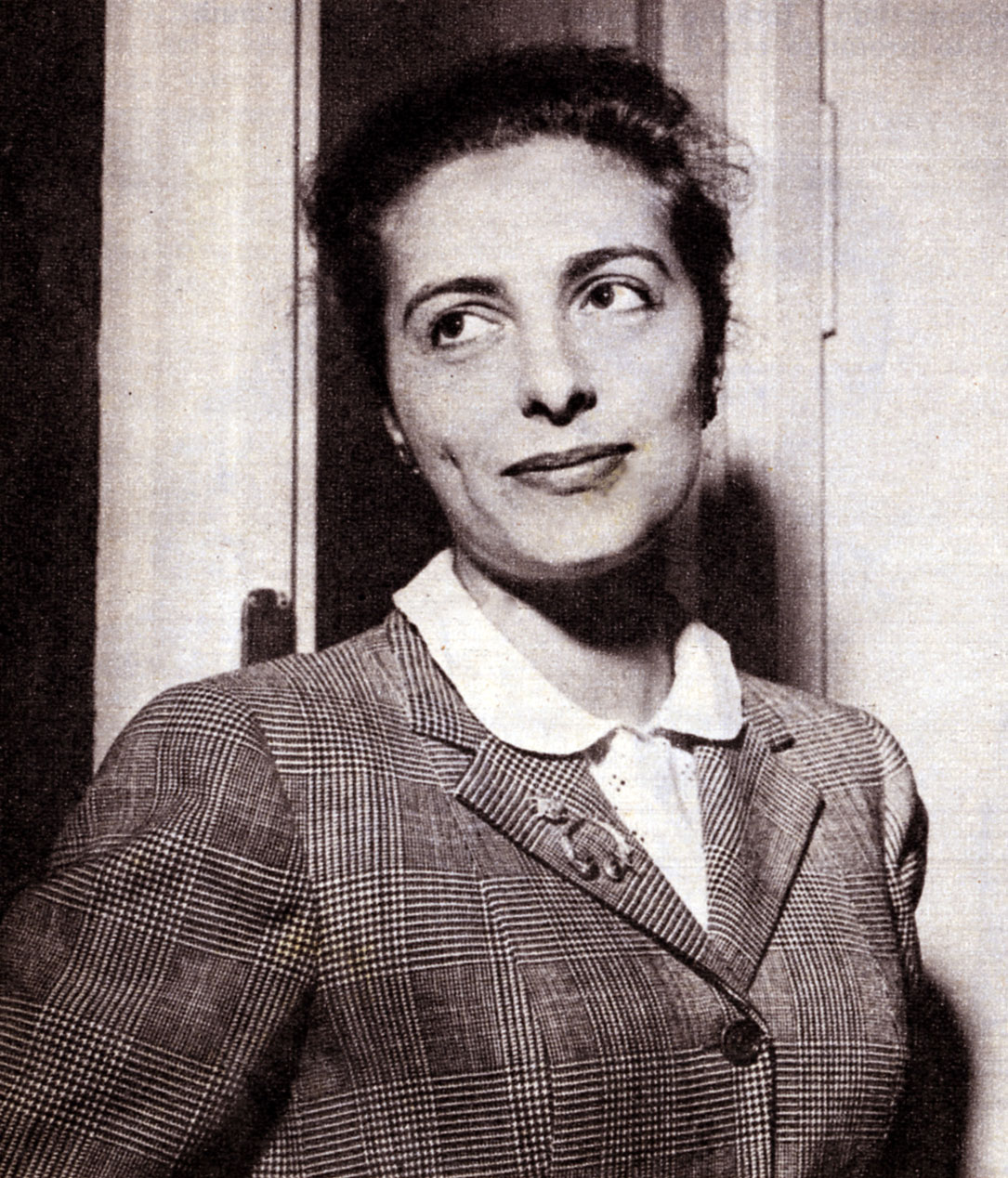
- Miserocchi in Radiocorriere magazine (1960)
- Born: 26 June 1925; Rome, Kingdom of Italy
- Died: 18 March 1988 (aged 62); Rome, Italy
- Occupation: Actress

Anna Miserocchi (26 June 1925 – 18 March 1988) was an Italian stage, film, television and voice actress.

== Life and career ==
Born in Rome, Miserocchi spent her childhood and adolescence in Italian Eritrea, where she had a journalistic apprenticeship. Returned in Italy she studied acting at the Accademia Nazionale di Arte Drammatica Silvio D'Amico, and had her breakout with the stage play The Pillars of Society, directed by Orazio Costa.

Miserocchi was mainly active on stage, in which she specialized in dramatic roles, working among others with Diego Fabbri, Luca Ronconi, Sandro Bolchi. She was also very active in television, where she got her major personal success playing the mother in E le stelle stanno a guardare, while in films she had only sporadic supporting roles. She was also active as a voice actress and a dubber, and among the actresses she lent her voice were Katharine Hepburn, Anne Bancroft, Ava Gardner, Melina Mercouri, Maggie Smith, Irene Papas, Agnes Moorehead and Capucine.
