= E le stelle stanno a guardare =

- Genre: Drama
- Directed by: Anton Giulio Majano
- Starring: Orso Maria Guerrini; Andrea Checchi; Anna Maria Guarnieri; Giancarlo Giannini
- Country of origin: Italy
- No. of episodes: 9

Original release
- Network: Programma Nazionale
- Release: September 7 – November 2, 1971

E le stelle stanno a guardare is a 1971 Italian adaptation of A. J. Cronin's 1935 novel The Stars Look Down. It was written and directed by Anton Giulio Majano and was produced by Radiotelevisione Italiana. The miniseries was a massive success, averaging about 20 million viewers per episode.

== Cast ==
- Andrea Checchi: Robert Fenwick
- Orso Maria Guerrini: David Fenwick
- Anna Miserocchi: Martha Fenwick
- Giancarlo Giannini: Arthur Barras
- Anna Maria Guarnieri: Jenny Sunley
- Loretta Goggi: Grace Barras
- Adalberto Maria Merli: Joe Gowlan
- Scilla Gabel: Laura Millington
- Enzo Tarascio: Richard Barras
- Laura Carli: zia Carol
- Roberto Chevalier: Pat Reedy
- Stefano Sibaldi: Macer
- Gioacchino Maniscalco: Ugo Fenwick
- Daniela Goggi: Sally Sunley
- Valentino Macchi: Harry Brice
- Franco Volpi: Bebbington
- Romano Malaspina: Henry Kinch
- Guido Celano: Harry Morris
- Dario Penne: Bert Wicks
- Gianni Mantesi: Armstrong
- Michele Malaspina: Hudspeth
- Luciano Melani: Nugent
- Silvio Noto: Secondino
- Carlo Alighiero: Secondino
- Sergio Di Stefano: Jack Reedy

== See also ==
- The Stars Look Down (1939 film)
- The Stars Look Down (1975 British miniseries)
