= The Cat (1977 film) =

- Directed by: Luigi Comencini
- Written by: Rodolfo Sonego; Augusto Caminito; Fulvio Marcolin
- Produced by: Sergio Leone
- Starring: Mariangela Melato; Ugo Tognazzi
- Cinematography: Ennio Guarnieri
- Edited by: Nino Baragli
- Music by: Ennio Morricone
- Production company: Rafran Cinematografica
- Distributed by: United Artists
- Release date: 1977
- Running time: 109 minutes
- Language: Italian

The Cat (Italian: Il gatto, also known as Who Killed the Cat?) is a 1977 Italian giallo-comedy film directed by Luigi Comencini. For this film, Mariangela Melato was awarded with a David di Donatello for Best Actress.

== Plot ==
Amedeo Pegoraro and his sister Ofelia are the greedy dual landlords of a run-down apartment building with few tenants left. The siblings are constantly fighting. Due to a real estate company offering one billion lira for the building on the condition that it has no tenants, Amedeo and Ofelia harass and spy on their tenants to goad them into leaving, or find justification to evict them. Amedeo is drawn to, but refuses the advances of, Wanda Yukovich, a young and attractive secretary who works for Legrand, a corrupt businessman. Amedeo and Ofelia find their pet cat dead, which was disliked by many tenants for its mischief. The siblings begin to investigate the death of the cat, hoping to evict the culprit; meanwhile, Police Commissioner Francisci becomes more and more exasperated by their antics.

Amedeo suspects the Princess due to gunshots being fired at the cat and her being experienced with firearms; after reporting this to the police, her apartment is raided and revealed to be an illegal brothel. After no gunshot wounds are found on the cat's body, Amedeo searches the apartment of a group of musicians while Ofelia unsuccessfully tries to seduce the priest Don Pezzolla. After discovering cocaine, Amedeo reports the musicians to the Guardia di Finanza, leading to their arrest for drug trafficking.

While investigating the apartment of Don Vito Garofalo, a mafia boss, Amedeo discovers bloodstains, and he and Ofelia follow two suspicious men who were in the apartment. After finding a corpse in the trunk of the two men's car, the siblings follow them to a beachfront home owned by a male politician who was in a relationship with Salvatore, Don Garofalo's gay butler. There, the two men dump Salvatore's body, attempting to frame the murder as a crime of passion. Ofelia writes anonymous threatening letters to the remaining tenants that state that 'we know your secret', which is seen as an empty threat by most of the tenants, but Paul Herdigher, an American journalist, takes it seriously and commits suicide. Ofelia discovers that the cat was poisoned by Wanda, and confronts her at work, only for Legrand to attempt to bribe the siblings to drop the case. Instead of accepting the bribe, Ofelia gives her testimony in the trial of Legrand. Ofelia explains to the court that the cat was poisoned as Wanda fed her dinner to it as she had suspected someone had poisoned her food, as she had incriminating recordings of Don Garofalo and Legrand.

Don Garofalo sends an assassin to kill Wanda, who eludes him and attempts to flee the country, Amedeo follows her, and receives the incriminating tapes from her. After the tapes are played in court, Don Garofalo is immediately arrested. Don Pezzolla moves out of his apartment after Ofelia writes obscene letters to the Bishop about Don Pezzola, and he gets transferred elsewhere as a result. With all tenants out of the building, the siblings return to the real estate company's lawyer to receive their money, only for Wanda to return to live in her apartment, and the lawyer promptly rips up their checks.

== Cast ==
- Ugo Tognazzi as Amedeo Pegoraro
- Mariangela Melato as Ofelia Pegoraro, Amedeo's sister
- Michel Galabru as Commissioner Francisci
- Dalila Di Lazzaro as Wanda Yukovich
- Jean Martin as Legrand
- Aldo Reggiani as Salvatore
- Philippe Leroy as Don Pezzolla
- Adriana Innocenti as the Princess
- Armando Brancia as the Police chief
- Mario Brega as the killer
- Bruno Gambarotta as the lawyer
- Luigi Comencini as an old violinist

== Production ==
The Cat is the third film produced by Sergio Leone, following My Name Is Nobody and A Genius, Two Partners and a Dupe. After the difficulties experienced with Tonino Valerii and Damiano Damiani, he chose a director he fully trusted, the veteran Luigi Comencini, for whom in 1952 he had been assistant in Girls Marked Danger. Ugo Tognazzi replaced the original choice Alberto Sordi as leading actor, as Leone considered Tognazzi would have a better chemistry with Mariangela Melato.

Dalila Di Lazzaro stopped filming because she didn't want to shoot a scene in the shower without panties. The reason was personal and she didn't want to talk about it: she had shaved her pubic area, because of a bet she had lost with her partner. In the end, they reached a compromise: the scene in the shower was filmed showing the camera her back, but the actress had to take off her panties. Tognazzi sent the dressmaker to spy, and so the secret was revealed.

== Reception ==
The film was a box office success in Italy, where it grossed over 1,1 billion lira, and in France.
