= Adriano Giannini =

Italian actor (born 1971)

- Giannini in 2026
- Born: 10 May 1971 (age 55); Rome, Italy
- Occupations: Actor; voice actor
- Years active: 1990–present
- Spouse: Gaia Trussardi (m. 2019)
- Parents: Giancarlo Giannini (father); Livia Giampalmo (mother)

Adriano Giannini (born 10 May 1971) is an Italian actor.

== Biography ==
Adriano Giannini was born in Rome on 10 May 1971, to actors Giancarlo Giannini and Livia Giampalmo. He began his career when he was 18 years old. His earliest notable role was alongside Madonna in the widely panned 2002 film Swept Away, a remake of the 1974 Italian film of the same name. Giannini played the same role that his father played in the original, also re-dubbing his own character's lines for the Italian and Spanish edition.

Giannini's international roles include the voice of Rat in the 2003 animated film Sinbad: Legend of the Seven Seas and Giancarlo Rossi in the 2012 ABC television series Missing, starring Ashley Judd and Sean Bean. In 2020, Giannini served as the narrator of the true-crime docuseries Italica Noir, a four-episode anthology released on Infinity+. In 2024, he starred in two Netflix productions, playing Tommaso, Rocco Siffredi's half-brother, in the series Supersex and Ugo Jacomelli in the film Lonely Planet.

Giannini dubbed the voice of Heath Ledger's portrayal of the Joker in the Italian release of The Dark Knight, and also Joaquin Phoenix's incarnation of the character in Joker and Joker: Folie à Deux, having previously dubbed his performances in The Master and Mary Magdalene. He has provided the Italian voices of Tom Hardy, Christian Bale, Raz Degan, Ryan Reynolds, and other actors in some of their work, and the animated characters Metro Man in Megamind and Mandrake in Epic.

=== Personal life ===
In 2019, Giannini married Trussardi creative director Gaia Trussardi after two years of dating. Giannini had an older brother, Lorenzo, who died from an aneurysm at the age of 21. He also has two younger half-brothers from his father's marriage to actress Eurilla del Bono.

== Filmography ==
=== Film ===
Key
†	Denotes films that have not yet been released

Year	Title	Role(s)	Notes
2001	Off to the Revolution by a 2CV	Marco	Main character
2002	Swept Away	Giuseppe Esposito	Leading male role
2003	Sinbad: Legend of the Seven Seas	Rat (voice)	Animated film, voice role
2004	Stay with Me	Nanni	Leading male role
2004	The Consequences of Love	Valerio Di Girolamo	
2004	Una talpa al bioparco	David	
2004	Ocean's Twelve	Museum director	Cameo appearance
2007	13 Roses	Fontenla	Minor character
2007	Nero bifamiliare	Ossobuco	
2008	Sandrine in the Rain	Leonardo	
2009	La casa sulle nuvole	Adriano Raggi	
2010	Kiss Me Again	Simone	
2011	Black Gold	Pilot	
2014	A Fairy-Tale Wedding	Luca Maggi	
2014	A Woman as a Friend	Giovanni	
2014	Without Pity	Manuel	
2014	The Ice Forest	Lorenzo	
2014	Ambo	Giulio	
2015	I Killed Napoléon	Paride Presca	
2015	Per amor vostro	Michele Migliaccio	
2015	They Call Me Jeeg	Reporter (voice)	Superhero film, voice cameo
2017	Il colore nascosto delle cose	Teo Moscone	
2018	The Legend of Red Hand	Davide	Short subject
2019	Vivere	Luca Attorre	
2020	The Ties	Adult Sandro	
2021	Three Floors	Giorgio	
2023	Adagio	Vasco	
2024	Lonely Planet	Ugo Jaconelli	
2025	Gioco pericoloso (film 2025)	Carlo Paris	Main character
2025	A Brief Affair	Rocco	Main character
2026	Back to Buenos Aires †	Mariano Guerra	

=== Television ===
Year	Title	Role(s)	Notes
2004	Luisa Sanfelice	Salvato Palmieri	Television film
2006	48 ore	Renato Tenco	12 episodes
2008	Tigri di carta	Gerard	3 episodes
2009	L'isola dei segreti: Koré	Vasco Brandi	4 episodes
2011	L'amore proibito	Valerio	Television film
2012	6 passi nel giallo	Marco Ventura	Episode: "Sotto protezione"
2012	Missing	Giancarlo Rossi	10 episodes
2013–2016	In Treatment	Pietro	14 episodes
2014	The Cosmopolitans	Sandro	Television film
2016	Boris Giuliano: Un poliziotto a Palermo	Boris Giuliano	Television film
2017	Il coraggio di vincere	Rocco Di Santo	Television film
2020	Italica Noir	Narrator	Documentary series; 4 episodes
2022	Bang Bang Baby	Santo Maria Barone	10 episodes
2024	Supersex	Tommaso	7 episodes
2025	Public Disorder	Michele Nobili	Main cast

=== Dubbing ===
==== Films (Animation, Italian dub) ====
Year	Title	Role	Ref
2010	Megamind	Metro Man	
2013	Epic	Mandrake	
2021	Sing 2	Jimmy Crystal	
2025	Elio	Lord Grigon	

==== Films (Live action, Italian dub) ====
Year	Title	Role	Original actor	Ref
2004	Bad Education	Enrique Goded	Fele Martínez	
2004	Lemony Snicket's A Series of Unfortunate Events	Lemony Snicket	Jude Law	
2005	Edmond	Edmond Burke's cellmate	Bokeem Woodbine	
2006	Candy	Dan	Heath Ledger	
2006	The Black Dahlia	Dwight "Bucky" Bleichert	Josh Hartnett	
2006	The Stone Merchant	Alceo	Jordi Mollà	
2007	Goodbye Bafana	James Gregory	Joseph Fiennes	
2007	I'm Not There	Robbie Clark	Heath Ledger	
2008	Definitely, Maybe	Will Hayes	Ryan Reynolds	
2008	10,000 BC	D'Leh	Steven Strait	
2008	The Dark Knight	The Joker	Heath Ledger	
2008	Miracle at St. Anna	Hector Negron	Laz Alonso	
2008	Australia	The Drover	Hugh Jackman	
2009	Star Trek	Captain Nero	Eric Bana	
2009	Whatever Works	Randy Lee James	Henry Cavill	
2009	Couples Retreat	Salvadore	Carlos Ponce	
2009	Avatar	Tsu'tey	Laz Alonso	
2010	Date Night	Tom "Taste" Felton / Tripplehorn	James Franco	
2010	The Fighter	Dicky Eklund	Christian Bale	
2011	Midnight in Paris	Ernest Hemingway	Corey Stoll	
2011	Green Lantern	Hal Jordan / Green Lantern	Ryan Reynolds	
2012	On the Road	Dean Moriarty	Garrett Hedlund	
2012	Lawless	Forrest Bondurant	Tom Hardy	
2012	The Master	Freddie Quell	Joaquin Phoenix	
2013	The Counselor	Westray	Brad Pitt	
2014	Exodus: Gods and Kings	Moses	Christian Bale	
2015	Fathers and Daughters	Cameron	Aaron Paul	
2015	The Revenant	John Fitzgerald	Tom Hardy	
2017	Star Wars: Episode VIII – The Last Jedi	DJ	Benicio del Toro	
2018	Mary Magdalene	Jesus Christ	Joaquin Phoenix	
2018	Venom	Eddie Brock / Venom	Tom Hardy	
2019	Hellboy	Anung Un Rama / Hellboy	David Harbour	
2019	Joker	Arthur Fleck / Joker	Joaquin Phoenix	
2021	Venom: Let There Be Carnage	Eddie Brock / Venom	Tom Hardy	
2021	Spider-Man: No Way Home	Eddie Brock / Venom	Tom Hardy	
2022	The Pale Blue Eye	Augustus Landor	Christian Bale	
2023	Napoleon	Napoleon Bonaparte	Joaquin Phoenix	
2024	Joker: Folie à Deux	Arthur Fleck / Joker	Joaquin Phoenix	
2024	Venom: The Last Dance	Eddie Brock / Venom	Tom Hardy	

==== Television (Animation, Italian dub) ====
Year	Title	Role	Notes	Ref
2007	Pat & Stan	Pat	39 episodes (1st voice)	

==== Television (Live action, Italian dub) ====
Year	Title	Role	Notes	Original actor	Ref
2005	Pope John Paul II	Young Karol Wojtyła	TV miniseries	Cary Elwes	
2009	Sisi	Gyula Andrássy	TV miniseries	Benjamin Sadler	
2010	La ladra	Dante Mistretta	TV miniseries	Johannes Brandrup	
2014–present	True Detective	Rust Cohle	Main cast	Matthew McConaughey	
