= Silvio Noto =

Italian TV and radio presenter, actor and voice actor

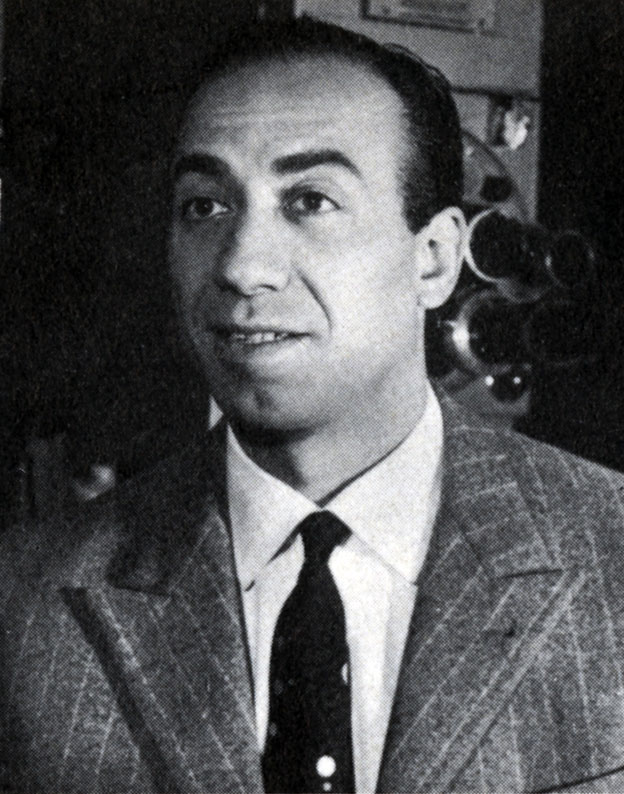
- Born: 13 June 1925; Bari, Italy
- Died: 24 October 2000 (aged 75); Rome, Italy
- Occupation: Actor

Silvio Noto (25 December 1926 – 24 October 2000) was an Italian TV and radio presenter, actor and voice actor.

Born in Bari, graduated in law, Noto became first known as radio-host after the first World War. He became popular as the host of several successful RAI television programs, starting from Casa serena (1950). He touched the peak of his fame in the second half of the 1950s, when he hosted together with Enzo Tortora the shows Primo applauso, Telematch and Voci e volti della fortuna.

Noto also appeared in a dozen films, mostly in supporting roles. On the small screen he was among the interpreters of the series E le stelle stanno a guardare.

== Biography ==
He was born in Bari on June 12, 1925. He lived for several years in Castrofilippo (AG), where his father worked as a pharmacist until 1938, when the whole family returned to Bari. A law student and pupil of Aldo Moro at the University of Bari, he began working as a radio actor after the war. He died in Rome on October 23, 2000, at the age of 75.
