= Sono stato io =

- Directed by: Alberto Lattuada
- Written by: Alberto Lattuada; Ruggero Maccari
- Starring: Giancarlo Giannini; Silvia Monti
- Cinematography: Alfio Contini
- Edited by: Sergio Montanari
- Music by: Gaetano Donizetti; Armando Trovajoli
- Release date: 1973
- Country: Italy
- Language: Italian

Sono stato io (internationally released as It Was I) is a 1973 Italian comedy-drama film co-written and directed by Alberto Lattuada. For his role Giancarlo Giannini was awarded as best actor at the San Sebastián International Film Festival.

== Cast ==
- Giancarlo Giannini: Biagio Solise
- Silvia Monti: Jacqueline
- Hiram Keller: Il Kid
- Orazio Orlando: Il Commissario
- Patricia Chiti: Gloria Strozzi
- Georges Wilson: Il pubblico ministero
- Giuseppe Maffioli: L'avvocato Difensore
- Piero Chiara: Il Presidente Della Corte
- Nino Pavese: Il Cavalier Armando Toluzzi
- Ely Galleani: L'autostoppista
