= Stay with Me (2004 film) =

- Directed by: Livia Giampalmo
- Written by: Livia Giampalmo
- Starring: Giovanna Mezzogiorno; Adriano Giannini
- Cinematography: Franco Lecca
- Music by: Paolo Vivaldi
- Release date: 2004
- Country: Italy
- Language: Italian

Stay with Me (Italian: Stai con me) is a 2004 Italian romantic drama film written and directed by Livia Giampalmo.

== Cast ==
- Giovanna Mezzogiorno: Chiara
- Adriano Giannini: Nanni
- Claudio Gioè: Rodolfo
- Paolo Briguglia: Don Marco

== See also ==
- List of Italian films of 2004
