= The Gambler Who Wouldn't Die =

- Italian: Ti ho cercata in tutti i necrologi
- Directed by: Giancarlo Giannini
- Based on: story by Lorenzo Cairoli
- Produced by: Megalì Production; Dean Film; Rai Cinema
- Starring: Giancarlo Giannini; F. Murray Abraham; Silvia De Santis; Jeffrey R. Smith; Jonathan Mallen; Andreas Schwaiger; A. Frank Ruffo; Mary Asiride; Jeffrey Knight; Hume Baugh
- Cinematography: Giovanni Fiore Coltellacci
- Edited by: Roberto Perpignani
- Distributed by: Bolero Film
- Release date: 30 May 2013
- Country: Italy
- Languages: English, Italian

The Gambler Who Wouldn't Die (Italian: Ti ho cercata in tutti i necrologi, lit. "I've been looking for you in all the obituaries") is an English/Italian dramatic film directed by and starring Giancarlo Giannini.

== Plot ==
Nikita is an Italian taxi driver who runs over a footballer in an accident and is forced to emigrate to Canada and make a new life. He finds work as a driver for a company of undertakers. One evening, he plays poker in a remote villa outside Toronto. To pay off his gambling debt, a manhunt is proposed: with guns in hand, his creditors will have 20 minutes to hunt him down and kill him. If he survives, Nikita will be considered to have paid his debt.

== Production ==
=== Development ===
Giannini has said that the idea for the film arose by chance at a dinner, when he was told about such manhunts taking place in Africa.

The film was produced by Magalì Production, Dean Film and Rai Cinema, with contribution from the Italian Ministry of Cultural Heritage and Activities. In 2013 it was presented at the Shanghai International Film Festival.

=== Filming ===
The film was shot in Italy, Canada and the United States.
