= The Seduction of Mimi =

1972 film by Lina Wertmüller

- Theatrical release poster
- Italian: Mimì metallurgico ferito nell'onore
- Directed by: Lina Wertmüller
- Written by: Lina Wertmüller
- Produced by: Daniele Senatore; Romano Cardarelli
- Starring: Giancarlo Giannini; Mariangela Melato; Agostina Belli; Luigi Diberti; Elena Fiore; Tuccio Musumeci; Ignazio Pappalardo; Turi Ferro
- Cinematography: Dario Di Palma
- Edited by: Franco Fraticelli
- Music by: Piero Piccioni
- Production company: Euro International Films
- Distributed by: Euro International Films
- Release date: 1972 (Italy)
- Running time: 121 minutes
- Country: Italy
- Language: Italian
- Box office: $1.9 million (US and Canada)

The Seduction of Mimi (Italian: Mimì metallurgico ferito nell'onore, lit. 'Mimi the Metalworker, Wounded in Honor') is a 1972 Italian comedy drama film written and directed by Lina Wertmüller, starring Giancarlo Giannini, Mariangela Melato, Agostina Belli, Luigi Diberti, Elena Fiore, Tuccio Musumeci, Ignazio Pappalardo and Turi Ferro.

== Plot ==
Set in both Sicily and mainland Italy, the film follows the adventures of a man nicknamed Mimi. Mimi is a poor laborer who is pressured by his employers to vote for the mafia candidate in a local election. Frustrated by the system and assured that the ballot will be secret, Mimi votes for the communist representative instead. However he is fired and assured he will never work again as the ballot was not secret. Disgusted Mimi flees to Turin, while his wife, Rosalia, stays in Sicily.

In Turin Mimi finds illegal construction work. When he witnesses one of the labourers falling to his death he helps the man into a van thinking that he is being taken to the hospital. When he discovers that his mafia bosses plan on dumping the body, Mimi tells him that his wife is the goddaughter of Liggio, a powerful mafioso. As a result, he is given a good union job at a factory. He also becomes further embroiled with the communist party.

One day, Mimi sees the beautiful Fiore on the street, selling sweaters. When she and her friend are attacked he helps them and learns that she is a Trotskyist. When they walk in the park he sexually assaults and tries to rape her, but Fiore fends Mimi off and says that she is a virgin, and will not make love with a man until she falls in love. Mimi continues to see her until finally, heartbroken he tells her that he loves her, but cannot bear to be around her as he feels she will never return his love. Fiore finally tells Mimi she loves him. Aware that Mimi is married, Fiore nevertheless takes him as a lover. She becomes pregnant, giving birth to a son, Mimi.

At the christening for their child, Mimi goes to get more champagne and happens upon a murder perpetrated by the mob. Though he is supposed to be shot, Mimi nevertheless ends up with only a scratch and, when the police question him, refuses to divulge any answers. As a result, he is promoted at work to a management job in Sicily. Terrified that his wife will discover his second family, Mimi hides Fiore and their child, and pretends to always be too tired for sex. That causes the townspeople to gossip, and begin to believe that Mimi is a homosexual. He is finally taken out by a few of his friends who tell him that Rosalia is pregnant with the child of another man, Amilcare. Mimi is outraged, and, after attacking Rosalia, tells her about Fiore and his son. Rosalia then decides to keep her child and refuses to divorce Mimi, gloating that her bastard child will bear his last name, while his son with Fiore will have a different name.

To avenge his honour, Mimi attempts to rape and then seduces Amalia, the wife of Amilcare. After sleeping with her he informs her that Amilcare had impregnated his wife, Rosalia. Initially horrified, Amalia decides that the best way for the two of them to get back at their cheating spouses is to conceive a child together, leading to monthly visits between the two.

When Amalia is several months pregnant, Mimi confronts her husband on the town steps, telling everyone there that Amalia is bearing Mimi's child. Enraged, Amilcare threatens to shoot Mimi, but Mimi is unconcerned; having considered the possibility, he warned Amalia to empty Amilcare's pistol. However, a man from the mafia, assigned to watch over Mimi, sees Amilcare reach for the pistol and shoots him, then shoves the smoking gun in Mimi's hand; Mimi is then jailed for Amilcare's murder. While in jail, Mimi is visited by a mafia man who informs him that, for taking the blame for the Amilcare murder, he is now a respected man and will be assured a job when he is released from jail. Mimi refuses; however, when released, Mimi is excited to see Fiore and little Mimi awaiting him. He is soon overwhelmed by Amalia and their child, and Rosalia's bastard son, all of whom clamor for him, calling him "Papa". In desperate need of money, Mimi goes to work for the mafia, promoting the election of Vico Tricarico. Disgusted that Mimi has abandoned his communist ideals, Fiore leaves him, taking young Mimi with her. Mimi chases after her, then collapses on the ground mourning his lost ideals.

== Cast ==
- Giancarlo Giannini as Carmelo Mardocheo / Mimí
- Mariangela Melato as Fiorella Meneghini
- Turi Ferro as Don Calogero / Vico Tricarico / Salvatore Tricarico
- Agostina Belli as Rosalia Capuzzo in Mardocheo
- Luigi Diberti as Pippino
- Elena Fiore as Amalia Finocchiaro
- Tuccio Musumeci as Pasquale
- Ignazio Pappalardo as Massaro 'Ntoni
- Gianfranco Barra as Serg. Amilcare Finnocchiaro
- Livia Giampalmo as Violetta

== Production ==
The Seduction of Mimi was the first collaboration between Lina Wertmüller and Mariangela Melato. For this film, she had to abandon Pietro Garinei's and Alessandro Giovannini's popular musical show Alleluja brava gente, which led to a dispute with the producers. The Seduction of Mimi was the start of a successful relationship between Wertmüller, Melato and Giannini that continued with Love and Anarchy (1973) and Swept Away (1974). Giannini had first worked with Wertmüller in Rita the Mosquito.

== Release ==
The Seduction of Mimi was shown in competition at the 1972 Cannes Film Festival.

Though filmed before Love and Anarchy, The Seduction of Mimi did not receive a U.S. release until June 1974, two months after the successful U.S. release of Love and Anarchy.

== Reception ==
On the review aggregator website Rotten Tomatoes, 86% of 7 critics' reviews are positive. Metacritic, which uses a weighted average, assigned the film a score of 69 out of 100, based on 5 critics, indicating "generally favorable" reviews.

== Awards ==
- 1972 David di Donatello Award for Best Actor Giancarlo Giannini

== US remake ==
The Seduction of Mimi was remade in the US as Which Way Is Up? starring Richard Pryor.
