= Giancarlo Giannini =

Italian actor (born 1942)

Giancarlo Giannini OMRI
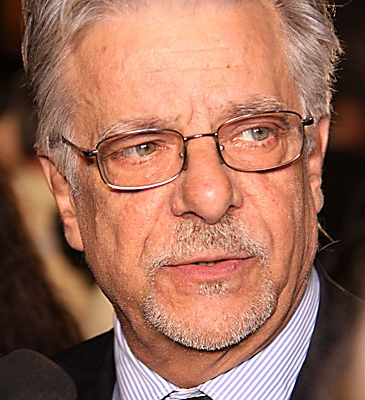
- Giannini in 2009
- Born: 1 August 1942 (age 84); La Spezia, Italy
- Education: Accademia Nazionale di Arte Drammatica Silvio D'Amico
- Occupations: Actor; voice artist; film director; screenwriter
- Years active: 1961–present
- Spouses: Livia Giampalmo (m. 1967; div. 1975) Eurilla del Bono (m. 1983)
- Children: 4, including Adriano Giannini

Giancarlo Giannini (Italian: [dʒaŋˈkarlo dʒanˈniːni]; born 1 August 1942) is an Italian actor. He won the Cannes Film Festival Award for Best Actor for his performance in Love and Anarchy (1973) and received an Academy Award nomination for Seven Beauties (1975). He is also a four-time recipient of the David di Donatello Award for Best Actor.

Giannini began his career on stage, starring in Franco Zeffirelli's productions of Romeo and Juliet and A Midsummer Night's Dream. After appearing predominantly on television throughout the early 1960s, he had his first lead role in a film in Rita the Mosquito (1965), the first of many collaborations with filmmaker Lina Wertmüller. He rose to international stardom through Wertmüller's The Seduction of Mimi (1972), Love and Anarchy (1973), Swept Away (1974), culminating in his Oscar-nominated turn in Seven Beauties (1975).

His other films include The Innocent (1976), Lili Marleen (1980), New York Stories (1990), A Walk in the Clouds (1995), Hannibal (2001), Man on Fire (2004), and the James Bond films Casino Royale (2006) and Quantum of Solace (2008). He is also a dubbing artist, contributing voice work to the Italian-language versions of dozens of films since the 1960s. He has been the main Italian dubber of Al Pacino since 1975, and has also dubbed Jack Nicholson, Michael Douglas, and Helmut Berger.

== Early life ==
Giannini was born on 1 August 1942 in La Spezia and he spent most of his childhood in the settlement of Pitelli. In 1952, Giannini and his family moved to Naples where he received a diploma in electronic engineering at the Alessandro Volta Technological State Technical Institute. When he was eighteen, he moved to Rome and studied at the Accademia Nazionale di Arte Drammatica Silvio D'Amico.

== Acting career ==
=== Stage ===
Giannini made his stage debut at the age of 18, opposite Lilla Brignone in In memoria di una signora amica, directed by Giuseppe Patroni Griffi. His breakthrough came when he was cast by Franco Zeffirelli in a production of Romeo and Juliet which played at The Old Vic.

=== Film and television ===
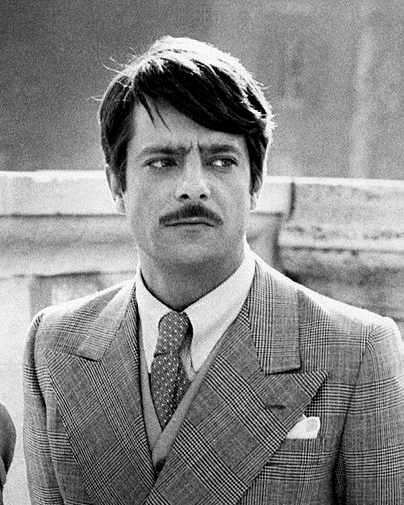
Giannini on the set of the film The Sensual Man, c. 1973

Giannini made his film debut in a small part in I criminali della metropoli in 1965. He appeared in supporting roles in Anzio and The Secret of Santa Vittoria, and starred in the original version of Swept Away. In 1967, he was a special guest on an episode of Mina's TV show "Sabato Sera". He had his breakthrough in 1970. In 1971, he appeared in E le stelle stanno a guardare, a television adaptation of A. J. Cronin's novel The Stars Look Down.

Giannini won a Cannes Film Festival Award for Best Actor for his performance in Love and Anarchy (1973). He had big box office hits with How Funny Can Sex Be? (1973) and The Sensual Man (1974). In 1976, he starred in Seven Beauties, for which he was nominated for the Academy Award for Best Actor. Giannini is known for his starring roles in films directed by Lina Wertmüller. In addition to Seven Beauties and Swept Away, he also appeared in The Seduction of Mimi, Love and Anarchy, A Night Full of Rain, Blood Feud, and Francesca e Nunziata.

Giannini has also achieved some international success. His fluency in English has brought him a number of featured roles in Hollywood productions, most notably as Inspector Pazzi in Hannibal. He also appeared in Man on Fire. Giannini played Alberto Aragón in A Walk in the Clouds in 1995, and Emperor Shaddam IV in the 2000 Dune miniseries. In 2002, he starred in the horror film Darkness. He later portrayed French agent René Mathis in the James Bond films Casino Royale (2006) and Quantum of Solace (2008).

In 2009, Giannini received a star on the Italian Walk of Fame in Toronto, Canada. On 6 March 2023 he received a star on the Hollywood Walk of Fame.

=== Voice acting ===
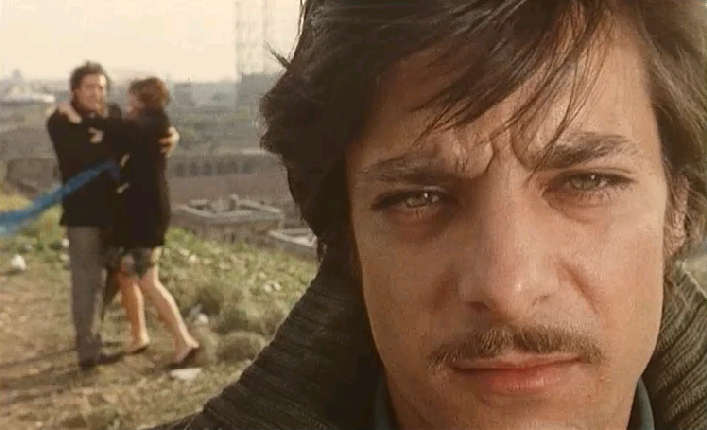
Giannini in The Pizza Triangle (1970)

Giannini has had a successful career as a voice actor and dubber. He helped with the foundation of the C.V.D. along with Renato Turi, Corrado Gaipa, Valeria Valeri, Oreste Lionello, Wanda Tettoni and other dubbers.

Giannini is the main Italian voice dubber of Al Pacino. Both he and Ferruccio Amendola were the primary dubbers of Pacino until Amendola's death in 2001 when Giannini became the main voice dubber. He also dubbed Jack Nicholson's voice as Jack Torrance in the Italian release of The Shining and the Joker in Batman and Michael Douglas as Gordon Gekko in Wall Street and the 2010 sequel as well as dubbing other actors such as Dustin Hoffman, Gérard Depardieu, Ryan O'Neal, Jeremy Irons, Mel Gibson, Tim Allen, Leonard Whiting and Ian McKellen in some of their work.

In Giannini's animated roles, he voiced Carl Fredricksen (voiced by Ed Asner) in the Italian dub of the Pixar film Up. He also provided the Italian voice of Raul Menendez in the Call of Duty game franchise. Outside of dubbing, he also provided voice roles in Italian cinema, notably the animated film Momo in which he voiced the main antagonist, and Giulio Base's religious drama Judas' Gospel, where the title character serves as a narrator.

== Other ventures ==
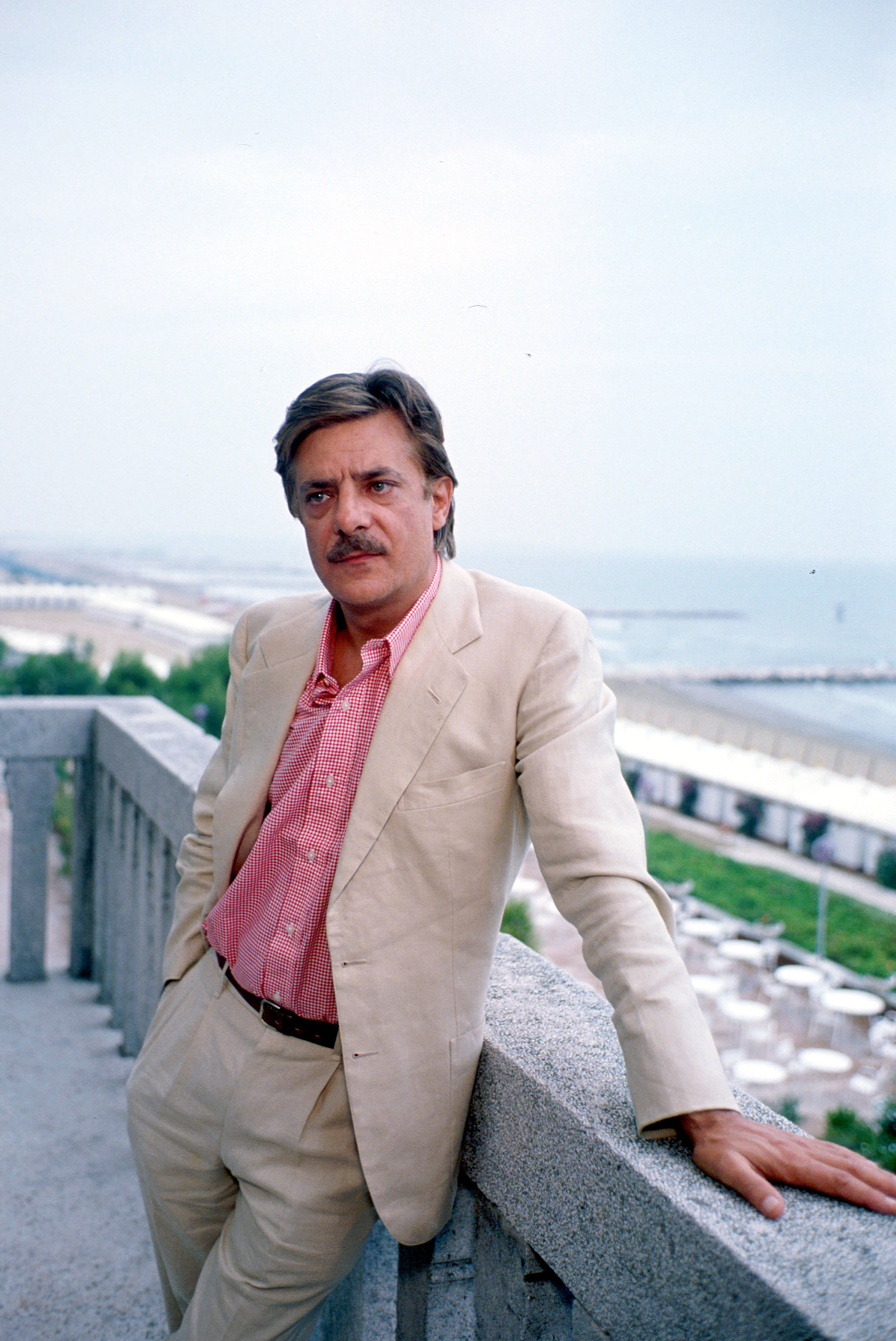
Giannini at the 49th Venice International Film Festival (1992)

Aside from acting, Giannini took up inventing as a hobby. Some of the gadgets he designed were used in the 1992 film Toys starring Robin Williams. Giannini also collaborated with Gabriella Greison on his memoir Sono ancora un bambino which was published by Longanesi in 2014. A year later, he received the Premio Cesare Pavese.

In 2012 he collaborated with Italian singer Eros Ramazzotti in "Io sono te", from his album Noi.

== Personal life ==
From 1967 until 1975, Giannini was married to actress Livia Giampalmo and they had two children. Their eldest son was Lorenzo, who died in 1987 from an aneurysm shortly before his 20th birthday. Their second-born son is actor Adriano Giannini, who played his father's role in the 2002 remake of Swept Away.

Since 1983, he has been married to Eurilla del Bono and they have two sons, Emanuele and Francesco who are musicians.

== Filmography ==
=== Cinema ===
Year	Title	Role(s)	Notes
1965	Libido	Christian	
1966	Rita the Mosquito	Professor Paolo Randi	
1967	I criminali della metropoli	Gerard Lemaire	
1967	Don't Sting the Mosquito	Professor Paolo Randi	
1967	Stasera mi butto	Carlo Timidoni	
1967	Arabella	Saverio	
1968	Anzio	Private Cellini	
1969	Fräulein Doktor	Lieutenant Hans Rupert	
1969	Le sorelle	Dario	
1969	The Secret of Santa Vittoria	Fabio de la Romagna	
1969	Rose Spot	Giancarlo	
1970	The Pizza Triangle	Nello Serafini	
1971	Una prostituta al servizio del pubblico e in regola con le leggi dello stato	Walter	
1971	Mazzabubù... Quante corna stanno quaggiù?	Lucio	
1971	Un aller simple	Weber	
1971	Mio padre monsignore	Oreste	
1971	Black Belly of the Tarantula	Inspector Tellini	
1972	Hector the Mighty	Ulisse	
1972	The Seduction of Mimi	Carmelo "Mimi" Mardocheo	
1972	Don Camillo e i giovani d'oggi	Veleno	
1972	Indian Summer	Giorgio "Spider" Mosca	
1973	Love and Anarchy	Antonio "Tunin" Soffiantini	
1973	It Was I	Biagio Soils	
1973	The Sensual Man	Paolo Castorini	
1973	How Funny Can Sex Be?	Domenico / Cesaretto / Enrico / Lello / Giansiro / The Donor / Michele Maccò / Saturnino / Doctor Bianchi	
1974	The Murri Affair	Tullio Murri	
1974	The Beast	Nino Patrovita	
1974	Swept Away	Gennarino Carunchio	
1975	The Immortal Bachelor	Gino Benacio	
1975	Seven Beauties	Pasqualino Frafuso	
1976	The Innocent	Tullio Hermil	
1978	A Night Full of Rain	Paolo	
1978	Blood Feud	Nicola "Nick" Sanmichele	
1979	Lovers and Liars	Guido Massacesi	
1979	Good News	The Man	
1979	Life Is Beautiful	Antonio Murillo	
1981	Lili Marleen	Robert	
1981	My Darling, My Dearest	Gennarino Laganà	
1984	Where's Picone?	Salvatore Cannavacciuolo	
1984	American Dreamer	Victor Marchand	
1985	Fever Pitch	Charley	
1986	Saving Grace	Abalardi	
1987	Ternosecco	Domenico / Mimi	Also director and screenwriter
1987	The Rogues	Guzman de Alfarache	
1988	Snack Bar Budapest	The Lawyer	
1989	'O Re	Francis II of the Two Sicilies	
1989	New York Stories	Claudio	Segment: Life Without Zoë
1989	Blood Red	Sebastian Collogero	
1989	The Sleazy Uncle	Riccardo	
1989	Brown Bread Sandwiches	Alberto	
1989	Time to Kill	Major	
1990	Dark Illness	Giuseppe Marchi	
1990	Nel giardino delle rose	Tramontano	
1990	The Amusements of Private Life	Charles Renard	
1992	Once upon a Crime	Inspector Bonnard	
1993	Giovanni Falcone	Paolo Borsellino	
1994	Like Two Crocodiles	Pietro Fraschini	
1995	A Walk in the Clouds	Alberto Aragon	
1995	Palermo – Milan One Way	Turi Arcangelo Leofonte	
1996	Celluloide	Sergio Amidei	
1996	The Border	Von Zirkenitz	
1996	La lupa	Father Angiolino	
1996	The Disappearance of Garcia Lorca	Taxi	
1996	Ultimo bersaglio	Leo Steiner	
1996	Más allá del jardín	Bernardo	
1996	New York Crossing	Enzo	
1996	Cervellini fritti impanati	Unknown	
1996	The Elective Affinities	Narrator (voice)	Voice-over
1997	Mimic	Manny Gavoila	
1997	Una vacanza all'inferno	Ortega	
1997	Heaven Before I Die	Thief	
1998	The Dinner	Professore	
1998	Dolce far niente	Count Nencini	
1998	The Room of the Scirocco	Marquis of Acquafurata	
1999	Vuoti a perdere	Francesco Cesena	
1999	Milonga	Commissioner	
1999	Terra bruciata	Macrì	
2000	Una noche con Sabrina Love	Leonardo	
2000	Welcome Albania	Unknown	
2001	Viper	Guastamacchia	
2001	Hannibal	Chief Inspector Rinaldo Pazzi	
2001	Una lunga lunga lunga notte d'amore	Marcello	
2001	CQ	Enzo	
2001	The Whole Shebang	Pop Bazinni	
2001	Momo	President of the Grey Men (voice)	Animated film
2002	I Love You Eugenio	Eugenio	
2002	Ciao America	Zi' Felice	
2002	The Bankers of God: The Calvi Affair	Flavio Carboni	
2002	Joshua	The Pope	
2002	Darkness	Albert Rua	
2002	Mario Monicelli, l'artigiano di Viareggio	Himself	
2002	The Council of Egypt	Narrator (voice)	Voice-over
2003	Incantato	Cesare	
2003	Five Moons Square	Branco	
2003	L'acqua... il fuoco	David	
2003	Forever	Giovanni	
2004	Man on Fire	Miguel Manzano	
2004	13 at a Table	Giulio	
2005	Raul: Straight to Kill	Judge Porfirio	
2006	Tirant lo Blanc	Emperor of Visantia	
2006	Salvatore – Questa è la vita	Timpaliscia	
2006	Casino Royale	René Mathis	
2007	Milano Palermo – Il ritorno	Turi Leofonte	
2008	Bastardi	Il Gatto / Carlo	
2008	Quantum of Solace	René Mathis	
2010	La bella società	Dr. Antonio Guarrasi	
2010	La prima notte della luna	Ivan	
2012	Omamamia	Lorenzo	
2013	AmeriQua	Don Cesare Ferracane	
2013	The Gambler Who Wouldn't Die	Nikita	Also director
2014	Promakhos	Petros	
2014	Love Pret-a-porte	Alfonso	
2015	Shades of Truth	Aaron Azulai	
2016	On Air - Storia di un successo	President Alberto Hazan	
2016	Il ragazzo della Giudecca	Judge Mangrella	
2016	Maremmamara	Ezio	
2016	Oggi a te... domani a me	Unknown	
2016	Prigioniero della mia libertà	Inspector Spaccini	
2017	The Neighborhood	Gianluca Moretti	
2017	Tulipani, Love, Honour and a Bicycle	Catarella	
2017	Nobili bugie	Franco	
2017	Pipi, Pupu & Rosemary: the Mystery of the Stolen Notes	Narrator (voice)	Animated film
2018	The Catcher Was a Spy	Edoardo Amaldi	
2018	Magical Nights	Leandro Saponaro	
2021	I fratelli De Filippo	Eduardo Scarpetta	
2021	Gianni Schicchi	Buoso Donati	
2023	Book Club: The Next Chapter	Police Chief	
2024	Cabrini	Pope Leo XIII	
2025	Judas' Gospel	Judas (voice)	

=== Television ===
Year	Title	Role(s)	Notes
1966	Lo squarciagola	Dingo	TV film
1966	David Copperfield	Adult David	TV miniseries
1967	Sabato Sera		
1970	La promessa	Leonidik	TV film
1971	E le stelle stanno a guardare	Arthur Barras	TV miniseries
1986	Sins	Marcello D'itri	TV miniseries
1989	Quattro storie di donne	Giuliano	TV miniseries (1 episode)
1990	Vita coi figli	Adriano Setti	TV miniseries
1993	Colpo di coda	Flavio Morselli	TV miniseries
1994	Nero come il cuore	Valentino Bruio	TV film
1994	Jacob	Laban	TV film
1997	Nessuno escluso	DIA Director	TV miniseries
1998	Ritornare a volare	Giulio	TV film
1998	Greener Fields	Carlo	TV film
2000	Frank Herbert's Dune	Shaddam IV	TV miniseries
2002	Francesca e Nunziata	Giordano Montorsi	TV film
2002	Dracula	Dr. Enrico Valenzi	TV miniseries
2003	My House in Umbria	Inspector Girotti	TV film
2004	Le cinque giornate di Milano	Carlo Cattaneo	TV miniseries
2005	Shadows in the Sun	Father Moretti	TV film
2006	Racconti neri	Narrator	TV programme (14 episodes)
2006	L'onore e il rispetto	Giuseppe Bastianelli	3 episodes (season 1x01-03)
2007	Il generale Dalla Chiesa	Carlo Alberto dalla Chiesa	TV miniseries
2008	Io non dimentico	Don Salvatore Conticello	TV miniseries
2008	Il maresciallo Rocca e l'amico d'infanzia	Benedetto Diveri	TV miniseries
2008	Il sangue e la rosa	Cardinale Rospigliosi	TV miniseries
2009	So che ritornerai	Borghi	TV film
2010	Prima della felicità	Ettore	TV film
2012	Michelangelo - Il cuore e la pietra	Himself	Docufiction
2013	Un angelo all'inferno	Pietro Bardelli	TV film
2016–2023	Stanotte a...	Giorgio Vasari / Gian Lorenzo Bernini / Carlo Goldoni / Pliny the Younger / Charles III of Spain / Alessandro Manzoni / Jules Maigret	TV docuseries
2018	Romanzo famigliare	Gian Pietro Liegi	TV series
2019	Catch-22	Marcello	TV miniseries (3 episodes)
2021	Leonardo	Andrea del Verrocchio	Historical drama, 2 episodes
2022	Il grande gioco	Dino De Gregorio	TV series

=== Dubbing ===
==== Films (Animation, Italian dub) ====
Year	Title	Role(s)	Ref
1972	Fritz the Cat	Fritz the Cat	
2009	Up	Carl Fredricksen	

==== Films (Live action, Italian dub) ====
Year	Title	Role(s)	Original actor	Ref
1966	Madamigella di Maupin	Cavaliere d'Albert	Tomas Milian	
1966	Blowup	Thomas	David Hemmings	
1967	The Hellbenders	Ben	Julián Mateos	
1968	Romeo and Juliet	Romeo	Leonard Whiting	
1969	The Damned	Martin von Essenbeck	Helmut Berger	
1969	Giacomo Casanova: Childhood and Adolescence	Giacomo Casanova	Leonard Whiting	
1970	When Women Had Tails	Ulli	Giuliano Gemma	
1970	Zabriskie Point	Mark	Mark Frechette	
1970	Many Wars Ago	Lieutenant Sassu	Mark Frechette	
1971	Death in Venice	Alfred	Mark Burns	
1971	The Designated Victim	"Count" Matteo Tiepolo	Pierre Clémenti	
1971	Lawman	Crowe Wheelwright	Richard Jordan	
1971	Valdez Is Coming	R.L. Davis	Richard Jordan	
1971	The Bloodstained Butterfly	Giorgio	Helmut Berger	
1972	Brother Sun, Sister Moon	Francesco di Bernardone	Graham Faulkner	
1973	Ludwig	Ludwig II of Bavaria	Helmut Berger	
1973	Les Voraces	Kosta	Helmut Berger	
1973	The Exorcist	Damien Karras	Jason Miller	
1975	The Passenger	David Locke	Jack Nicholson	
1975	Dog Day Afternoon	Sonny Wortzik	Al Pacino	
1975	Barry Lyndon	Redmond Barry	Ryan O'Neal	
1976	Marathon Man	Thomas Babington "Babe" Levy	Dustin Hoffman	
1976	The Desert of the Tartars	Lieutenant Drogo	Jacques Perrin	
1976	Dona Flor and Her Two Husbands	Valdomiro 'Vadinho' Santos Guimarães	José Wilker	
1977	Looking for Mr. Goodbar	Tony Lopanto	Richard Gere	
1978	California Suite	Bill Warren	Alan Alda	
1980	Cruising	Steve Burns	Al Pacino	
1980	The Shining	Jack Torrance	Jack Nicholson	
1981	Tales of Ordinary Madness	Charles Serking	Ben Gazzara	
1982	Author! Author!	Ivan Travalian	Al Pacino	
1983	Danton	Georges Danton	Gérard Depardieu	
1983	Twilight Zone: The Movie	John Valentine	John Lithgow	
1987	The Last Emperor	Puyi	John Lone	
1987	Wall Street	Gordon Gekko	Michael Douglas	
1989	Batman	Jack Napier / Joker	Jack Nicholson	
1989	Maggio musicale	Pier Francesco Ferraioli	Malcolm McDowell	
1992	Glengarry Glen Ross	Richard Roma	Al Pacino	
1992	Hoffa	Jimmy Hoffa	Jack Nicholson	
1992	Scent of a Woman	Frank Slade	Al Pacino	
1993	Carlito's Way	Carlito Brigante	Al Pacino	
1994	Swimming with Sharks	Buddy Ackerman	Kevin Spacey	
1994	The Santa Clause	Scott Calvin	Tim Allen	
1994	The Madness of King George	King George III	Nigel Hawthorne	
1995	The American President	Andrew Shepherd	Michael Douglas	
1995	Heat	Vincent Hanna	Al Pacino	
1995	Richard III	Richard III	Ian McKellen	
1996	City Hall	Mayor John Pappas	Al Pacino	
1996	Looking for Richard	Richard III	Al Pacino	
1997	Donnie Brasco	Benjamin "Lefty" Ruggiero	Al Pacino	
1997	The Devil's Advocate	John Milton / Satan	Al Pacino	
1998	Gunslinger's Revenge	Johnny Lowen	Harvey Keitel	
1999	Asterix and Obelix vs. Caesar	Obelix	Gérard Depardieu	
1999	Excellent Cadavers	Giovanni Falcone	Chazz Palminteri	
1999	The Insider	Lowell Bergman	Al Pacino	
1999	Any Given Sunday	Tony D'Amato	Al Pacino	
2001	The Pledge	Jerry Black	Jack Nicholson	
2001	Viper	Leone	Harvey Keitel	
2001	How Harry Became a Tree	Harry Maloney	Colm Meaney	
2001	Witches to the North	Gallio De Dominicis	Paul Sorvino	
2002	Amnèsia	Xavier	Juanjo Puigcorbé	
2002	Callas Forever	Larry Kelly	Jeremy Irons	
2002	Insomnia	Will Dormer	Al Pacino	
2002	Simone	Viktor Taransky	Al Pacino	
2003	The Recruit	Walter Burke	Al Pacino	
2003	Gigli	Starkman	Al Pacino	
2003	Something's Gotta Give	Harry Sanborn	Jack Nicholson	
2004	Evilenko	Andrei Chikatilo	Malcolm McDowell	
2004	The Merchant of Venice	Shylock	Al Pacino	
2006	The Departed	Frank Costello	Jack Nicholson	
2007	Ocean's Thirteen	Willy Bank	Al Pacino	
2010	Wall Street: Money Never Sleeps	Gordon Gekko	Michael Douglas	
2011	The First Man	Cemetery Guard	Michel Crémades	
2012	Stand Up Guys	Val	Al Pacino	
2019	Once Upon a Time in Hollywood	Marvin Schwarz	Al Pacino	
2019	The Irishman	Jimmy Hoffa	Al Pacino	
2020	Creators: The Past	Lord Kanaff	Marc Fiorini	
2021	House of Gucci	Aldo Gucci	Al Pacino	

==== Television (Live action, Italian dub) ====
Year	Title	Role(s)	Notes	Original actor	Ref
1997	Nostromo	Dr. Monygham	TV miniseries	Albert Finney	
1998	The Count of Monte Cristo	Edmond Dantès	TV miniseries	Gérard Depardieu	
2000	Piovuto dal cielo	Cesare Palmieri	TV miniseries	Ben Gazzara	
2002	Napoléon	Joseph Fouché	TV miniseries	Gérard Depardieu	
2002	John XXIII: The Pope of Peace	Angelo Giuseppe Roncalli	TV film	Ed Asner	
2007	War and Peace	Prince Bolkonsky	TV miniseries	Malcolm McDowell	
2010	You Don't Know Jack	Jack Kevorkian	TV film	Al Pacino	
2013	Phil Spector	Phil Spector	TV film	Al Pacino	
2018	Paterno	Joe Paterno	TV film	Al Pacino	
2020–2023	Hunters	Meyer Offerman / Wilhelm Zuchs	Main cast	Al Pacino	

==== Video games (Italian dub) ====
Year	Title	Role(s)	Ref
2012	Call of Duty: Black Ops II	Raul Menendez	

==== Documentaries (Italian dub) ====
Year	Title	Role(s)	Original actor	Ref
2006	Eye of the Leopard	Narrator	Jeremy Irons	
2016	Black and White Stripes: The Juventus Story	Narrator	F. Murray Abraham	

== Awards and nominations ==
=== Academy Awards ===
Year	Category	Nominated work	Outcome
1977	Best Actor	Seven Beauties	Nominated

=== David di Donatello ===
Year	Category	Nominated work	Outcome
1972	Best Actor	The Seduction of Mimi	Won
1984	Best Actor	Where's Picone?	Won
1989	Best Actor	'O Re	Nominated
1990	Best Actor	Dark Illness	Nominated
1994	Best Supporting Actor	Giovanni Falcone	Nominated
1995	Best Supporting Actor	Like Two Crocodiles	Won
1996	Best Actor	Palermo - Milan One Way	Nominated
1996	Best Actor	Celluloide	Won
2000	Golden Plate	—N/a	Won
2002	Best Actor	I Love You Eugenio	Won
2003	Best Supporting Actor	Incantato	Nominated

=== Nastro d'Argento ===
Year	Category	Nominated work	Outcome
1971	Best Supporting Actor	The Pizza Triangle	Nominated
1973	Best Actor	The Seduction of Mimi	Won
1974	Best Actor	The Sensual Man	Nominated
1974	Best Actor	Love and Anarchy	Won
1984	Best Actor	Where's Picone?	Nominated
1989	Best Actor	'O Re	Nominated
1991	Best Supporting Actor	The Amusements of Private Life	Nominated
1991	Best Actor	Dark Illness	Nominated
1994	Best Male Dubbing	Carlito's Way (for dubbing Al Pacino in the Italian version)	Won
1999	Best Supporting Actor	The Dinner	Won
1999	Best Actor	The Room of the Scirocco	Won
2001	Best Supporting Actor	Hannibal	Won

=== Film festivals ===
Festival	Year	Category	Nominated work	Outcome
Cannes Film Festival	1973	Best Actor	Love and Anarchy	Won
Capri Hollywood International Film Festival	2003	Legend Award	—N/a	Won
Giffoni Film Festival	2013	François Truffaut Award	—N/a	Won
Kineo Awards	2008	Best Actor	Milano Palermo - Il ritorno	Nominated
Locarno Festival	2014	Excellence Award	—N/a	Won
Los Angeles Italia Film Festival	1999	Outstanding Achievement in Film	—N/a	Won
Milan Film Festival	2002	Lifetime Achievement Award	—N/a	Won
Newport Beach Film Festival	2002	Best Actor	I Love You Eugenio	Won
Primavera del Cinema Italiano Festival	2009	Career Award	—N/a	Won
San Sebastián International Film Festival	1973	Best Actor	Sono stato io	Won
Taormina Film Fest	1989	Career Charybdis	—N/a	Won
Taormina Film Fest	2001	Taormina Arte Award	—N/a	Won
Taormina Film Fest	2007	Taormina Arte Award	—N/a	Won
Viareggio EuropaCinema	1998	Platinum Award for Cinematic Excellence	—N/a	Won

=== Other awards ===
Institution	Year	Category	Nominated work	Outcome
Ciak D'Oro	1996	Best Supporting Actor	Like Two Crocodiles	Won
Fangoria Chainsaw Award	2002	Best Supporting Actor	Hannibal	Nominated
Flaiano Prize	2002	Career Award for Cinema	—N/a	Won
Giffoni Film Festival	2013	François Truffaut Award	—N/a	Won
Globo D'Oro	1973	Best Actor	The Seduction of Mimi	Won
Globo D'Oro	1974	Best Actor	Sono stato io	Won
Globo D'Oro	1989	Best Actor	'O Re	Won
Globo D'Oro	1997	Best Actor	The Border	Nominated
Globo D'Oro	1999	Best Actor	Milonga	Won
Globo D'Oro	2010	Career Award	—N/a	Won

== Honours ==
- Grand Officer (2nd Class), Order of Merit of the Italian Republic (2003)
- Knight Grand Cross (1st Class), Order of Merit of the Italian Republic (2007)
