= Wertmüller =

Wertmüller is a German surname. Notable people with the surname include:

- Adolf Ulrik Wertmüller (1751–1811), Swedish painter
- Lina Wertmüller (1928–2021), Italian screenwriter and film director
- Massimo Wertmüller (born 1956), Italian actor, nephew of Lina
