= Lucio Amelio =

Italian art dealer, curator and an actor

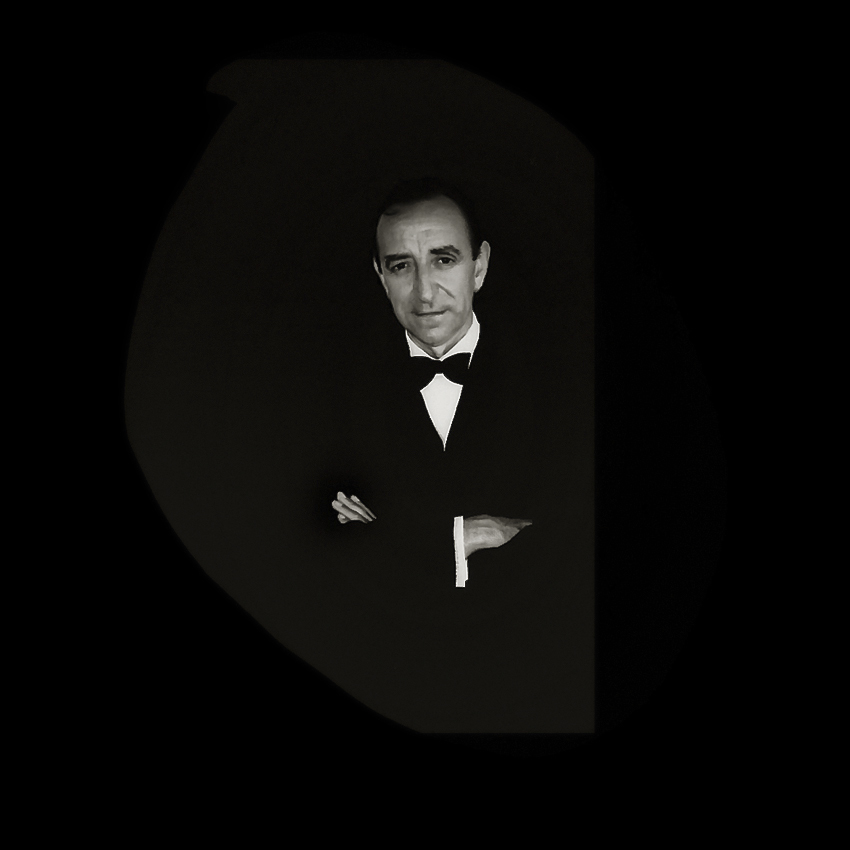
Lucio Amelio in 1990, photographed by Augusto De Luca

Lucio Amelio (13 September 1931 – 2 July 1994) was an Italian art dealer, curator, and actor. For decades he contributed to make Naples an international art centre encouraging the dialogue between European and American contemporary arts.

== Biography ==
Lucio Amelio was born on 13 September 1931 in Via dei Tribunali in Naples. He had four sisters – Marisa, Giuliana, Lina and Anna. Due to the Second World War, his family moved several times and settled in 1944 for twelve years in Resina.

After graduating in 1949 from Liceo scientifico, Amelio enrolled in architecture studies at the University of Naples. Amelio quickly established himself as a leading figure in the international contemporary art market from the mid-sixties to the mid-nineties. In 1965 he opened the Modern Art Agency, a gallery in Parco Margherita dedicated to experimental art. In 1969 he opened the Galleria Lucio Amelio in Naples' Piazza dei Martiri, which hosted exhibitions of artists such as Robert Rauschenberg, Mario Merz, Jannis Kounellis, Keith Haring, Cy Twombly, Dieter Hacker.

In 1980 Amelio introduced Joseph Beuys to Andy Warhol, and later that year he organized the exhibition of portraits "by Beuys, Warhol".

One of Amelio's most significant achievements was the exhibition Terrae Motus he organized in 1982 following the 1980 Irpinia earthquake in Italy. In 1987, Terrae Motus traveled to the Grand Palais, Paris. The exhibition featured the work of more than 50 artists, including Joseph Beuys, Andy Warhol, Gerhard Richter, Keith Haring, Cy Twombly, Miquel Barceló, Tony Cragg, Mimmo Paladino, Giulio Paolini, George Condo, Emilio Vedova, Anselm Kiefer, Philip Taaffe, Donald Baechler, David Bowes, Robert Mapplethorpe, Luciano Fabro, Gilbert & George, Richard Long and many others. Later grouped in a collection, today "Terrae Motus" is on permanent display in the Palace of Caserta.

In 1988, Amelio co-founded an art gallery, Galerie Pièce Unique, in Paris in the middle of Saint-Germain-des-Prés neighborhood.

== Death ==
Amelio had been HIV positive since 1987. He died in his hometown of Naples as a result of AIDS on 2 July 1994, aged 62.

=== Tomb on Capri ===
Lucio Amelio's grave is located on the Cimitero Acattolico, the non-Catholic cemetery, on the island of Capri. Many international writers and artists are buried there, such as the writer Norman Douglas and the French Baron Jacques d'Adelswärd-Fersen – whose house on Capri, the Villa Lysis, Amelio wanted to restore in the last few years of his life had. Amelio's gravestone, a large rectangular plate made of black Belgian marble was designed Amelio himself with the help of the art critic Michele Bonuomoa year before his death. In the middle of the marble slab, under the name of "Lucio Amelio", a circle is engraved, the interior of which, at the highest level of the sun, causes an intense light through a mirror effect; below is the inscription L'isola del Sonno (Isle of Sleep), which cites the title of a small object created by Joseph Beuys in Capri in the summer of 1974.

== Acting ==
Amelio was also an actor and worked with director Lina Wertmuller in four films.

Filmography
Date	Name	Type	Director	Notes
1975	Seven Beauties (Pasqualino Settebellezze)	film	Lina Wertmüller	
1978	Blood Feud (Fatto di sangue fra due uomini per causa di una vedova, si sospettano moventi politici)	film	Lina Wertmüller	
1979	A Night Full of Rain (La fine del mondo nel nostro solito letto in una notte piena di pioggia)	film	Lina Wertmüller	
1991	Saturday, Sunday and Monday (Sabato, domenica e lunedì)	film, made for television	Lina Wertmüller	
1992	Death of a Neapolitan Mathematician (Morte di un matematico napoletano)	film	Mario Martone	
