= David Bowe =

David Bowe may refer to:

- David Bowe (actor) (born 1964), American character actor
- David Bowe (politician) (born 1955), British politician, Member of the European Parliament, 1989–2004

== See also ==
- David Bowie (disambiguation)
- David Bowes (born 1957), American painter
