= Softly, Softly (film) =

- Italian: Sotto.. sotto.. strapazzato da anomala passione
- Directed by: Lina Wertmüller
- Screenplay by: Enrico Oldoini; Lina Wertmüller
- Produced by: Mario Cecchi Gori; Vittorio Cecchi Gori
- Starring: Enrico Montesano; Veronica Lario; Luisa De Santis
- Cinematography: Dante Spinotti
- Edited by: Luigi Zitta
- Music by: Paolo Conte
- Production company: InterCapital
- Distributed by: Compagnia Edizioni Internazionali Artistiche Distribuzione (CEIAD)
- Release date: 1 March 1984
- Running time: 100 minutes
- Country: Italy
- Language: Italian

Softly, Softly (Italian: Sotto.. sotto.. strapazzato da anomala passione) (also known as Sotto... sotto) is a 1984 Italian comedy-drama film directed and co-written by Lina Wertmüller. The film was released in Italy on 1 March 1984.

== Plot ==
Ester finds herself sexually attracted to her newly divorced friend Adele. When Ester admits another love to her hot-headed husband, he searches manically for the rival, who he never suspects is a woman.

== Cast ==
- Enrico Montesano as Oscar
- Veronica Lario as Ester
- Luisa De Santis as Adele
- Massimo Wertmüller as Ginetto
- Mario Scarpetta as Amilcare
- Isa Danieli as Rosa
- Lella Fabrizi as Sora Ines
- Alfredo Bianchini as Il sacerdote
- Renato D'Amore as Mario
- Antonia Dell'Atte as Bellissima
- Giuseppe Cederna as Cinecittà actor

== Reception ==
=== Critical response ===
Blau, Robert (May 2, 1986). "'Sotto..Sotto' Blends Love, Lust, and Humor in an Unusual Afternoon". Chicago Tribune.
Doyle, Thomas M. (February 14, 1986). "Sorta Sorta". The Harvard Crimson.
Gollan, Donna (April 1986). "Sotto Sotto" (PDF). Broadside: A Feminist Review. Vol. 7, no. 6. p. 10. Archived from the original (PDF) on 2019-05-11.
Maslin, Janet (November 1, 1985). "Screen: Twosome in 'Sotto'". The New York Times. Section C. p. 32.
Russell, Candice (July 11, 1986). "What is love without fidelity? For that..." Sun-Sentinel.
Thomas, Kevin (January 29, 1986). "Movie Review: Heavy Hand Smothers 'Sotto'". Los Angeles Times.
