= Ciao, Professore! =

1992 comedy film

- Italian: Io speriamo che me la cavo
- Directed by: Lina Wertmüller
- Written by: Alessandro Bencivenni; Leonardo Benvenuti; Piero De Bernardi; Domenico Saverni; Lina Wertmüller; Andrej Longo
- Produced by: Mario Cecchi Gori & Vittorio Cecchi Gori; Ciro Ippolito
- Starring: Paolo Villaggio; Paolo Bonacelli; Isa Danieli
- Cinematography: Gianni Tafani
- Edited by: Pier Luigi Donardi
- Music by: Carlo D'Angiò
- Production companies: Penta Film; Cecchi Gori Group Tiger Cinematografica; Eurolux Produzione S.r.l.
- Distributed by: Variety Distribution
- Release date: 9 October 1992 (Italy)
- Running time: 95 minutes
- Country: Italy
- Language: Italian
- Box office: $4 million (Italy)

Ciao, Professore! (lit. 'Hello, Professor!'; original title: "Io speriamo che me la cavo", which is a grammatically erroneous phrase meaning "Let's hope that I scrape by (the Judgement Day)" taken from Raffaele's homework essay) is a 1992 Italian "fish out of water" comedy film about an elementary school teacher from northern Italy who is sent by mistake to an impoverished town in the Naples region of southern Italy. There he must deal with vast cultural differences and teach chronically truant children who only respect violence and power, especially one young boy who is already caught up in the gangster lifestyle. The film was directed by Lina Wertmüller and stars Paolo Villaggio.

== Plot ==
Marco Tullio Sperelli is a professor of Italian language for children from the region of Liguria in northern Italy. Due to a failure of the Ministry of Education, he is transferred not to another northern town, but instead a similar-sounding town near Naples, in southern Italy. There he finds a school where the students, teachers and parents deal with the poverty of the south in a resigned and practical manner that he feels are unworthy of the morality, ethics and education children should learn. (For example, most of the children avoid school because they must work for a living to help support their families.)

Initially contemptuous of the attitudes in the south, and linking them to the underlying poverty, Marco Tullio requests a transfer back north. In the meantime, things are brought to a head by Raffaele, a student registered to his class who only shows up to recruit other children into the gangster lifestyle. Marco Tullio slaps Raffaele for threatening him with physical violence, and is then appalled when – instead of being scandalized by the event – the principal, children and even the boy's mother are encouraged by it because it means he may do what needs to be done to set the children on the right path. Marco Tullio attempts to withdraw his request for a transfer. Eventually, Raffaele grows respect for Marco Tullio after he helps save Raffaele's mother, who has become ill and needs transport to the hospital.

In the end, Marco Tullio is transferred (it is implied that the principal, who does not like him for his arrogance, pushed the transfer through). As his train pulls away, he reads Raffaele's homework essay – the first homework he has handed in – which discusses the end of the world, and how many people will go to Hell, but some may yet enter Heaven. He ends with, "as for me, let's hope I make it" (hence the Italian version of the film title), implying that his improved behavior will not end with Marco Tullio's departure. The film ends as the teacher, watching through the window, sees the boy riding away on his moped.

== Cast ==
- Paolo Villaggio: Marco Tullio Sperelli
- Paolo Bonacelli: Ludovico Mazzullo
- Isa Danieli: Preside
- Gigio Morra: Custode
- Sergio Solli: Cartonaio

== Production ==
The script was inspired by the 1990 Italian bestseller Io speriamo che me la cavo (Me, Let's Hope I Make It). The book is a collection of essays written by the students of Italian primary school teacher Marcello D'Orta, who taught in Arzano, a suburb of Naples. In the essays the children describe many of the difficulties they and their families encounter (poverty, drugs, crime, the disrepair of their city, etc.). The film has the main protagonist often read the essays from the book (which, in the plot, are written as homework by the children), as their content is displayed through live-action scenes, although some other ones are simply adapted into plot elements and scenes. Io speriamo che me la cavo was also the original Italian title of the film.

== Reception ==
Reviewer Marc Vincenti notes of the film's R rating, "Why, you might ask, is a film that is without an iota of sex or violence, and that has completely to do with 8- and 9-year-olds, off limits to that very age group as an audience? Let's just say it was a good thing the subtitler knew how to spell four-letter words."

It was the tenth most popular Italian film in Italy for the year.

== Year-end lists ==
- 10th – James Berardinelli, ReelViews
