= Franco Fraticelli =

Italian film editor

- Born: 30 August 1928; Rome, Kingdom of Italy
- Died: 26 April 2012 (aged 83); Rome, Italy
- Occupation: film editor

Franco Fraticelli (30 August 1928 in Rome, Kingdom of Italy – 26 April 2012 in Rome, Italy) was an Italian film editor with more than 150 film credits. Fraticelli was director Dario Argento's editor of choice from his earliest films (The Bird with the Crystal Plumage-1969) through Opera (1987).

He also had an important collaboration with director Lina Wertmüller, commencing with her third film Rita the Mosquito (1966). Fraticelli edited nine more of her films through A Joke of Destiny (1983). In particular, Fraticelli edited Seven Beauties (1976). This film, which has been called her masterpiece, was nominated for the Academy Award for Best Director. It was the first nomination of a woman for the award.

Fraticelli was nominated for the David di Donatello award for editing Boys on the Outside (directed by Marco Risi - 1990); Fraticelli subsequently edited two more films with Risi, Nel Continente Nero (1993) and Kaputt Mundi. In 2006 his career was honored by a Kineo Award.

== Partial filmography ==
- The Knight Has Arrived! (1950)
- The Reluctant Magician (1951)
- Seven Hours of Trouble (1951)
- Vacation with a Gangster (1951)
- Poppy (1952)
- La valigia dei sogni (1953)
- It Was She Who Wanted It! (1953)
- We're All Necessary (1956)
- Goliath and the Barbarians (1959)
- My Friend, Dr. Jekyll (1960)
- Fountain of Trevi (1960)
- David and Goliath (1960)
- The Hunchback of Rome (1960)
- His Women (1961)
- Gold of Rome (1961)
- Ursus (1961)
- The Giant of Metropolis (1961)
- Seven Seas to Calais (1962)
- Il carabiniere a cavallo (1962)
- The Seventh Sword (1962)
- Gold for the Caesars (1963)
- The Scapegoat (1963)
- Ursus in the Land of Fire (1963)
- Secret of the Sphinx (1964)
- Amori pericolosi (1964)
- Tears on Your Face (1964)
- La vita agra (1964)
- Hercules and the Black Pirates (1964)
- Grand Canyon Massacre (1964)
- Minnesota Clay (1965)
- Two Sergeants of General Custer (1965)
- I Knew Her Well (1966)
- Weekend, Italian Style (1966)
- Rita the Mosquito (1966)
- Balearic Caper (1966)
- John the Bastard (1967)
- Don't Sting the Mosquito (1967)
- Day of Anger (1967)
- Matchless (1967)
- The Head of the Family (1967)
- Requiescant (1967)
- Bandits in Milan (1968)
- The Sex of Angels (1968)
- Machine Gun McCain (1969)
- The Tough and the Mighty (1969)
- Love and Anger (1969)
- Help Me, My Love (1969)
- Wake Up and Die (1969)
- The Bandit (1969)
- Man and Wife (1970)
- May Morning (1970)
- The Bird with the Crystal Plumage (1970)
- A Girl Called Jules (1970)
- The Cat o' Nine Tails (1971)
- Black Turin (1972)
- A Reason to Live, a Reason to Die (1972)
- The Seduction of Mimi (1972)
- My Dear Killer (1972)
- I Kiss the Hand (1973)
- Love and Anarchy (1973)
- The Five Days (1973)
- Swept Away (1974)
- All Screwed Up (1974)
- Seven Beauties (1975)
- Deep Red (1975)
- Last Days of Mussolini (1975)
- Amore libero - Free Love (1975)
- Basta che non si sappia in giro (1976)
- Strange Occasion (1976)
- And Agnes Chose to Die (1976)
- Fear in the City (1976)
- Suspiria (1977)
- Kleinhoff Hotel (1977)
- Blood Feud (1978)
- A Night Full of Rain (1978)
- The Perfect Crime (1978)
- Tigers in Lipstick (1979)
- Inferno (1980)
- Café Express (1980)
- Fontamara (1980)
- Comin' at Ya! (1981)
- Tenebrae (1982)
- Where's Picone? (1983)
- A Joke of Destiny (1983)
- Treasure of the Four Crowns (1983)
- Petomaniac (1983)
- Demons (1985)
- Phenomena (1985)
- Demons (1985)
- Amici miei – Atto III (1985)
- Demons 2 (1986)
- Opera (1987)
- Sweets from a Stranger (1987)
- The Church (1989)
- Street Kids (1989)
- Boys on the Outside (1990)
- The Devil's Daughter (1991)
- Blue Tornado (1991)
- The Wicked (1991)
- The Monster (1994)
- Cemetery Man (1994)
- Kaputt Mundi (1998)

== See also ==
- List of film director and editor collaborations
