= Ferdinando and Carolina =

- Directed by: Lina Wertmüller
- Written by: Lina Wertmüller; Raffaele La Capria
- Produced by: Edwige Fenech
- Starring: Sergio Assisi; Gabriella Pession; Nicole Grimaudo
- Cinematography: Blasco Giurato
- Edited by: Pierluigi Leonardi
- Music by: Italo Greco; Paolo Raffone; Marcello Vitale
- Release date: 1999
- Country: Italy
- Language: Italian

Ferdinando and Carolina (Italian: Ferdinando e Carolina) is a 1999 Italian historical comedy film directed by Lina Wertmüller.

== Plot ==
In the 1820s, Italy's aging King Ferdinand I falls ill in Naples and, on his deathbed, reminisces about the early years of his reign. After a rambunctious and impetuous childhood, he is poised to assume the throne at the age of 16. Although the lusty young prince already has a lover, the Princess of Medina, a marriage is arranged with 16-year-old Princess Maria Teresa of Austria.

The princess dies of smallpox before the wedding can take place. Her sister is proposed as a suitable wife, but she dies as well. When a third sister, Maria Carolina, is presented, Ferdinand is decidedly unenthusiastic, but his advisors and Carolina's mother, the Habsburg Empress Maria Theresa, push him into the marriage. He discovers on their honeymoon that he and Carolina get along famously in the bedroom, if nowhere else.

While Ferdinand is never cured of his roving eye, the ambitious Carolina soon has the King under her spell, and her political power comes to rival his own. Obsessed with the pleasures of the flesh, the spoiled sovereigns seem oblivious to the revolutions threatening to consume France and, eventually, the whole of Europe. The king casually threatens to behead those who displease him, threats that are sometimes carried out. The royals travel to the ruins of Pompeii and undertake hunting parties, but political intrigue intrudes into their lives.

== Cast ==
- Sergio Assisi as Ferdinand I of the Two Sicilies
- Gabriella Pession as Maria Carolina of Austria
- Nicole Grimaudo as Princess of Medina
- Adriano Pantaleo as Young Ferdinand I
- Mario Scaccia as Old Ferdinand I
- Lola Pagnani as Sara Goudar
- Carlo Caprioli as Joseph II
- Moira Grassi as the Countess of San Marco
- Lucilla Vacondìo as Lady Stratfordshire
- Leo Benvenuti as Bernardo Tanucci
- Elio Pandolfi as Galiani
- Armando Pugliese as the Prince of Sansevero
- Isa Danieli as Fravulella
- Silvana De Santis as Maria Theresa
- Gianni Bonagura as the Austrian Ambassador
- Elena Presti as Lucia Migliaccio
- Gerardo Gargiulo as Charles III
- Lea Gramsdorff as Maria Amalia of Saxony
