= All Screwed Up =

1974 film by Lina Wertmüller

- Theatrical release poster
- Italian: Tutto a posto e niente in ordine
- Directed by: Lina Wertmüller
- Written by: Lina Wertmüller
- Produced by: Romano Cardarelli
- Starring: Luigi Diberti; Lina Polito; Nino Bergamini; Sara Rapisarda; Giuliana Calandra; Isa Danieli; Claudio Volonté; Renato Rotondo; Eros Pagni
- Cinematography: Giuseppe Rotunno
- Edited by: Franco Fraticelli
- Music by: Piero Piccioni
- Production company: Euro International Films
- Distributed by: Euro International Films
- Release date: 21 February 1974 (Italy)
- Running time: 105 minutes
- Country: Italy
- Language: Italian

All Screwed Up (Italian: Tutto a posto e niente in ordine; also known as Everything Ready, Nothing Works) is a 1974 Italian comedy-drama film written and directed by Lina Wertmüller.

== Plot ==
Two young men from the country, Gino and Carletto, arrive in Milan. They immediately meet a young woman who is also a new arrival and who is crying as she cannot locate her cousin. The men help her find her cousin Isotta and makes plans to meet again. The boys get jobs working in factories while Adelina is taken in by Isotta and taught to work as a maid by her enterprising friend Biki. Eventually they all move into an apartment that once belonged to an artist friend of Biki's who committed suicide.

They are later joined by Sante, another man they met on their first day in Milan, and his pregnant girlfriend Mariuccia who promise to stay with them only a few weeks until they get on their feet. When Mariuccia gives birth to twins they find themselves staying on.

Carletto longs to be with Adelina but she insists that they remain chaste as she is an old-fashioned country girl from Sicily despite the fact that her fashion, career and lifestyle are increasingly citified and Milanese. When Carletto proposes to Adelina she tells him to get a better job. Carletto does manage to get a better job working in a restaurant but when he proposes to Adelina again she tells him it's not economical to marry and they should instead try to save their money so that they could open a small shop in 10 years.

Gino meanwhile meets a small-time crook who scammed him on his first day in Milan and goes to work with him as a burglar. Ashamed of what he does he lies to Carletto and tells him he has gone into business independently.

Meanwhile, a friend of Carletto's tells him that the only way to sleep with Adelina is to take her by force. He then rapes Adelina in the kitchen. While Adelina is pleased after her first sexual encounter she refuses to have sex with Carletto again by insisting that it is not economical as she sees that Mariuccia and Sante have 7 children from multiple pregnancies. Biki and Adelina want them to move out so they can rent their room to earn more money. Adelina wonder what has become of her cousin Isotta who now ignores the whole family. Unbeknownst to her Isotta works as a prostitute in order to send money back to her family in the countryside.

Meanwhile, Sante becomes increasingly desperate and wretched after finding out Mariuccia is pregnant again. He becomes involved in a plot with fascists and is arrested as the fall man after a man is killed. Carletto tries to help Sante by defending him to the police but is shocked to see Gino running away from the scene. Gino confesses to him that he cannot get involved with the police as he is a burglar and already has a record.

Carletto briefly considers moving away and starting over but his reminiscing falls apart when he is called back to work.

== Cast ==
- Luigi Diberti as Gino
- Lina Polito as Mariuccia
- Nino Bergamini as Carletto
- Sara Rapisarda as Adelina
- Eros Pagni as Bagonghi
- Giuliana Calandra as Biki
- Claudio Volonté as Bruno the cook
- Isa Danieli as Isotta
- Aldo Puglisi as cook
- Renato Rotondo as Sante

== Reception ==
Stanley Kauffmann of The New Republic described All Screwed Up thus: 'It's strident, ecstatic, restless, perceptive, humane, despairing. It takes banal material and sizzles it electrically into new life'.
