= Eros Pagni =

Italian actor

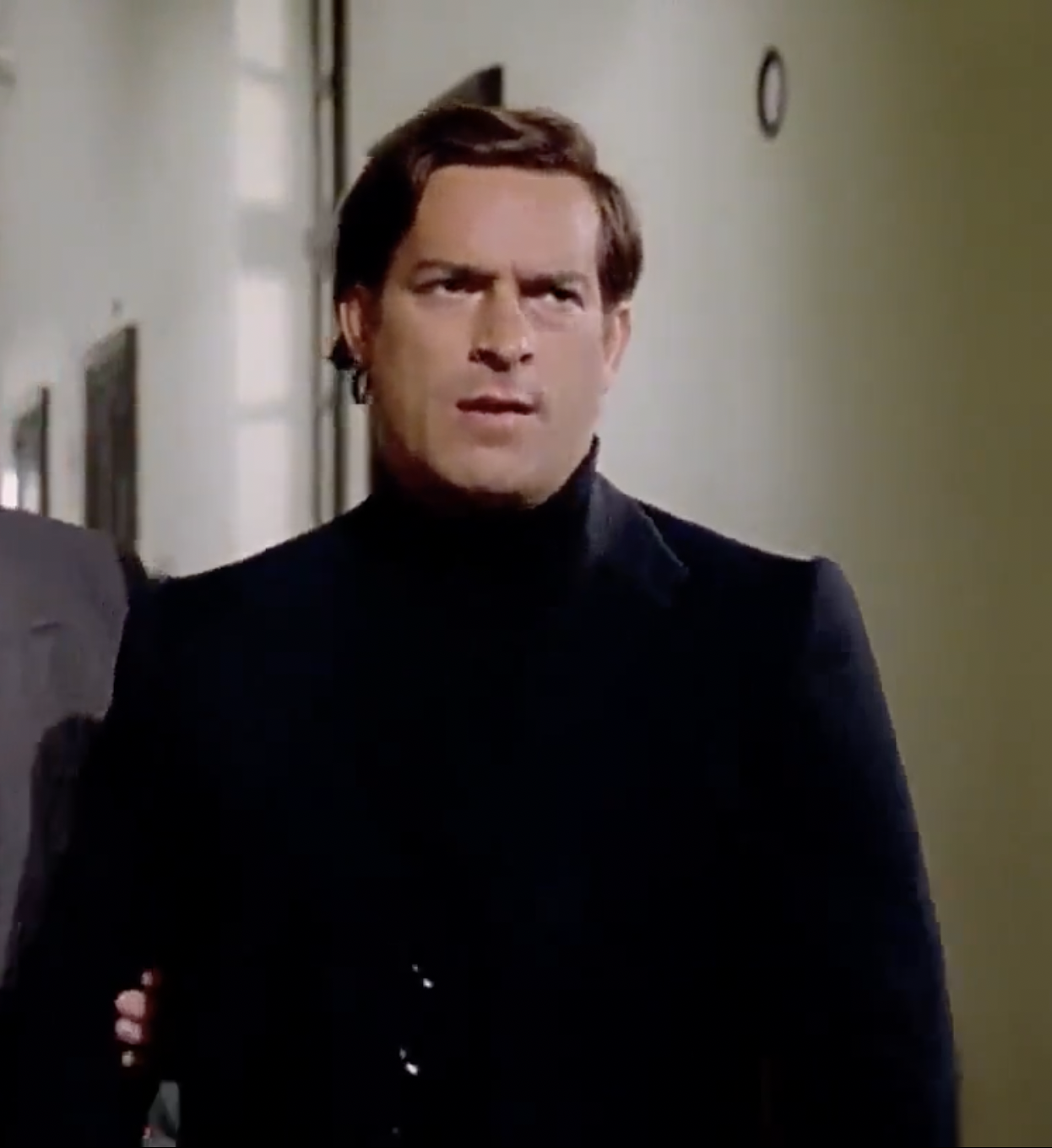
- Pagni in Deep Red (1975)
- Born: 28 August 1939 (age 86); La Spezia, Italy
- Occupations: Actor; voice actor
- Years active: 1964–present

Eros Pagni (born 28 August 1939) is an Italian actor and voice actor.

== Biography ==
Born in La Spezia, at the age of 17, Pagni started attending the Silvio d'Amico National Academy of Dramatic Arts in Rome and then went back to Genoa and played roles in works by William Shakespeare, Molière, Eugene O'Neill, Luigi Pirandello and more.

As a film actor, Pagni has appeared in more than 30 films since 1964. He is well known for his collaboration with Lina Wertmüller in films such as Love and Anarchy, Swept Away and All Screwed Up and for his minor role in Dario Argento's Deep Red.

He and all the cast of Ettore Scola's The Dinner received the Nastro d'Argento Award for Best Supporting Actor.

Occasionally, Pagni also serves as a voice actor. He is notable for having dubbed in Italian actors like R. Lee Ermey in Full Metal Jacket and Christopher Lee in Gremlins 2: The New Batch and animated characters such as Judge Claude Frollo from The Hunchback of Notre Dame and Master Shifu in the Kung Fu Panda film series.

== Selected filmography ==
- Pleasant Nights (1966)
- Il generale dorme in piedi (1972)
- Love and Anarchy (1973)
- Swept Away (1974)
- All Screwed Up (1974)
- Processo per direttissima (1974)
- Deep Red (1975)
- Soldier of Fortune (1976)
- I nuovi mostri (1977)
- Goodnight, Ladies and Gentlemen (1978)
- Liquirizia (1979)
- Hypochondriac (1979)
- Odd Squad (1981)
- Sweet Pea (1981)
- Grog (1982)
- Flirt (1983)
- Teresa (1987)
- Red American (1991)
- The Storm Is Coming (1993)
- The Dinner (1998)
- Love Returns (2004)
- Family Game (2007)
- Amici miei – Come tutto ebbe inizio (2011)
- It's All About Karma (2017)
- Put Grandma in the Freezer (2018)

== Dubbing roles ==
=== Animation ===
- Claude Frollo in The Hunchback of Notre Dame
- Tzekel-Kan in The Road to El Dorado
- Master Shifu in Kung Fu Panda, Kung Fu Panda 2, Kung Fu Panda 3

=== Live action ===
- Sgt. Muldoon in The Green Berets
- Gunnery Sergeant Hartman in Full Metal Jacket
- The Governor in A Violent Life
- Doctor Cushing Catheter and "Brain" Gremlin in Gremlins 2: The New Batch
- Maître Martin in Les Rois maudits
- Ezra Goldman in Ray Donovan
