= Seven Beauties =

- Italian theatrical release poster
- Directed by: Lina Wertmüller
- Written by: Lina Wertmüller
- Produced by: Arrigo Colombo; Lina Wertmüller
- Starring: Giancarlo Giannini; Fernando Rey
- Cinematography: Tonino Delli Colli
- Edited by: Franco Fraticelli
- Music by: Nando de Luca e Enzo Jannacci
- Production company: Medusa Distribuzione
- Distributed by: Medusa Distribuzione
- Release dates: 4 May 1975 (France); 20 December 1975 (Italy)
- Running time: 115 minutes
- Country: Italy
- Language: Italian
- Box office: $1.4 million

Seven Beauties (Italian: Pasqualino Settebellezze, "Pasqualino Sevenbeauties") is a 1975 historical black comedy drama Italian film written and directed by Lina Wertmüller and starring Giancarlo Giannini, Fernando Rey, and Shirley Stoler.

The film is about an Italian everyman who deserts the army during World War II and is captured by the Germans and sent to a prison camp, where he does anything he can to survive. Through flashbacks, we learn about his seven unattractive sisters, his accidental murder of one sister's lover, his imprisonment in an insane asylum, where he rapes a patient, and his volunteering to be a soldier to escape confinement.

For her work on the film, Wertmüller became the first woman nominated for the Academy Award for Best Director. The film received three other Academy Award nominations, including one for Best Foreign Language Film. It was also nominated for the Golden Globe Award for Best Foreign Film.

The production design and costume design are by Wertmüller's husband, Enrico Job.

== Plot ==
The picaresque story follows its protagonist, Pasqualino (Giannini), a dandy and small-time hood in Naples in Fascist and World War II-era Italy.

To defend his family's honor, Pasqualino kills a pimp who had turned his sister into a prostitute. To dispose of the victim's body, he dismembers it and places the parts in suitcases. Caught by the police, he confesses to the murder, but successfully pleads insanity and is sentenced to 12 years in a psychiatric ward. Desperate to get out, he volunteers for the Italian Army. With an Italian comrade, he eventually deserts the army, but they are captured and sent to a German concentration camp.

Pasqualino attempts to survive the camp by providing sexual favors to the female commandant (Stoler). His plan succeeds, but the commandant puts Pasqualino in charge of his barracks as a kapo. He is told he must select six men from his barracks to be killed to prevent all from being killed. Pasqualino ends up executing his former Army comrade, and is responsible for the death of another fellow prisoner, a Spanish anarchist.

At the war's end, upon his return to Naples, Pasqualino discovers that his seven sisters, his fiancée, and even his mother have all survived by becoming prostitutes. Unfazed, he insists on marrying his fiancée as soon as possible.

== Cast ==
- Giancarlo Giannini as Pasqualino Frafuso, a.k.a. Settebellezze
- Fernando Rey as Pedro, the anarchist prisoner
- Shirley Stoler as the Prison Camp Commandant (Note: Shirley Stoler's character was based on Ilse Koch, notoriously known as "the Bitch of Buchenwald". The wife of the camp's commandant Karl Otto Koch, she reportedly took sadistic pleasure in torturing inmates, and was accused of having lampshades made out of their skin, although these charges were dropped due to lack of evidence.)
- Elena Fiore as Concettina, a sister
- Piero Di Iorio as Francesco, Pasqualino's comrade
- Enzo Vitale as Don Raffaele
- Roberto Herlitzka as Socialist
- Lucio Amelio as Lawyer
- Ermelinda De Felice as Pasqualino's mother
- Bianca D'Origlia as Psychiatrist
- Francesca Marciano as Carolina
- Mario Conti as Totonno "18 Carati", Concettina's pimp

== Production ==
=== Casting ===
Giannini starred in three other films Wertmüller made during this period: The Seduction of Mimi (1972), Love and Anarchy (1973), and Swept Away (1974).

=== Filming locations ===
Seven Beauties was filmed on location in Naples, Campania, Italy.

=== Opening sequence ===
In the opening sequence of Seven Beauties, spoken over World War II archival footage showing the destruction of cities and men, Wertmüller defines the object of her critique—a "particular petty bourgeois social type".

== Reception ==
=== Critical response ===
At the time of its release, it was controversial for its graphic depiction of Nazi concentration camps. In his 1976 essay "Surviving", Bruno Bettelheim, while admiring the film's artistry, severely criticized its depiction of the experience of concentration camp survivors. Bettelheim's own views about concentration camps have likewise been critiqued.

On Rotten Tomatoes, the film has an approval rating of 62% based reviews from 21 critics. In April 2019, a restored version of the film was selected to be shown in the Cannes Classics section at the 2019 Cannes Film Festival.

=== Awards and nominations ===
Year	Award	Category	Nominee(s)	Result
1977	Academy Awards	Best Foreign Language Film		Nominated
1977	Academy Awards	Best Director	Lina Wertmüller	Nominated (Note: This was the first nomination of a woman for Best Director in the history of the Academy Awards.)
1977	Academy Awards	Best Actor	Giancarlo Giannini	Nominated
1977	Academy Awards	Best Screenplay – Written Directly for the Screen	Lina Wertmüller	Nominated
1977	Directors Guild of America Awards	Outstanding Directorial Achievement in Motion Pictures	Lina Wertmüller	Nominated
1977	Golden Globe Awards	Best Foreign Film		Nominated
1977	New York Film Critics Circle Awards	Best Film		Runner-up
1977	New York Film Critics Circle Awards	Best Director	Lina Wertmüller	Runner-up
1977	New York Film Critics Circle Awards	Best Screenplay	Lina Wertmüller	Runner-up
2017	Boston Society of Film Critics Awards	Best Rediscoveries| style="background: #9EFF9E; color: #000; vertical-align: middle; text-align: center; " class="yes table-yes2 notheme"|Won		

== See also ==
- List of submissions to the 49th Academy Awards for Best Foreign Language Film
- List of Italian submissions for the Academy Award for Best Foreign Language Film
- List of Italian Academy Award winners and nominees
- List of Italian films of 1975
- The Seven Beauties

== Sources ==
- Bondanella, Peter (2009). History of Italian Cinema. New York: Continuum. ISBN 978-0826417855.
- Bullaro, Grace Russo (2007). Man in Disorder: The Cinema of Lina Wertmüller in the 1970s. Troubador Publishing Ltd. ISBN 978-1905886395.
- Wertmüller, Lina (1978). The Screenplays of Lina Wertmuller. New York: Werner Books. ISBN 978-0446872621.
