= Summer Night =

- Directed by: Lina Wertmüller
- Written by: Lina Wertmüller
- Cinematography: Camillo Bazzoni
- Edited by: Luigi Zitta
- Music by: Pino D'Angiò; Lilli Greco
- Release date: 31 October 1986
- Country: Italy
- Language: Italian

Summer Night (Italian: Notte d'estate con profilo greco, occhi a mandorla e odore di basilico, also known as Summer Night with Greek Profile, Almond Eyes and Scent of Basil) is a 1986 Italian comedy film directed by Lina Wertmüller. The film was selected as the Italian entry for the Best Foreign Language Film at the 59th Academy Awards, but was not accepted as a nominee.

== Plot summary ==
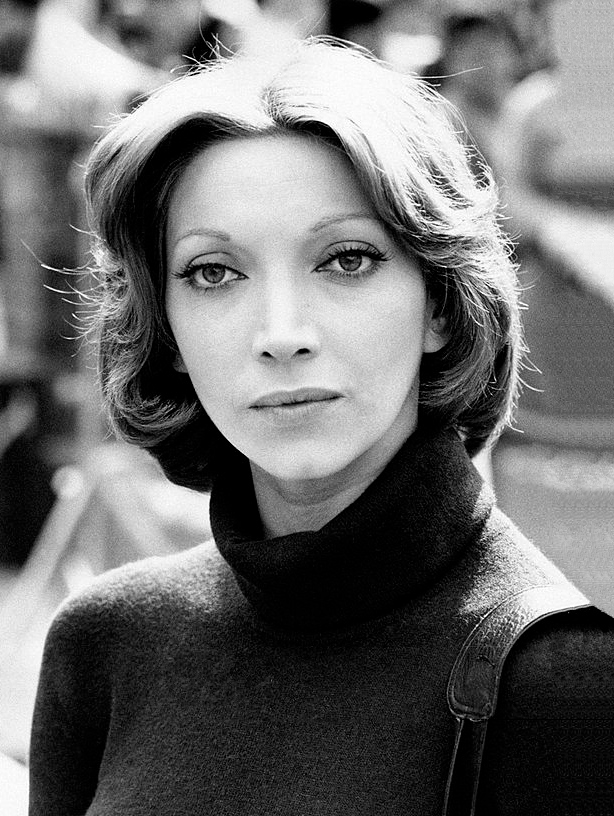
Mariangela Melato plays Fulvia Block, who has an aggressive solution to Italy’s recent spate of kidnappings of rich Italians for exorbitant ransoms.

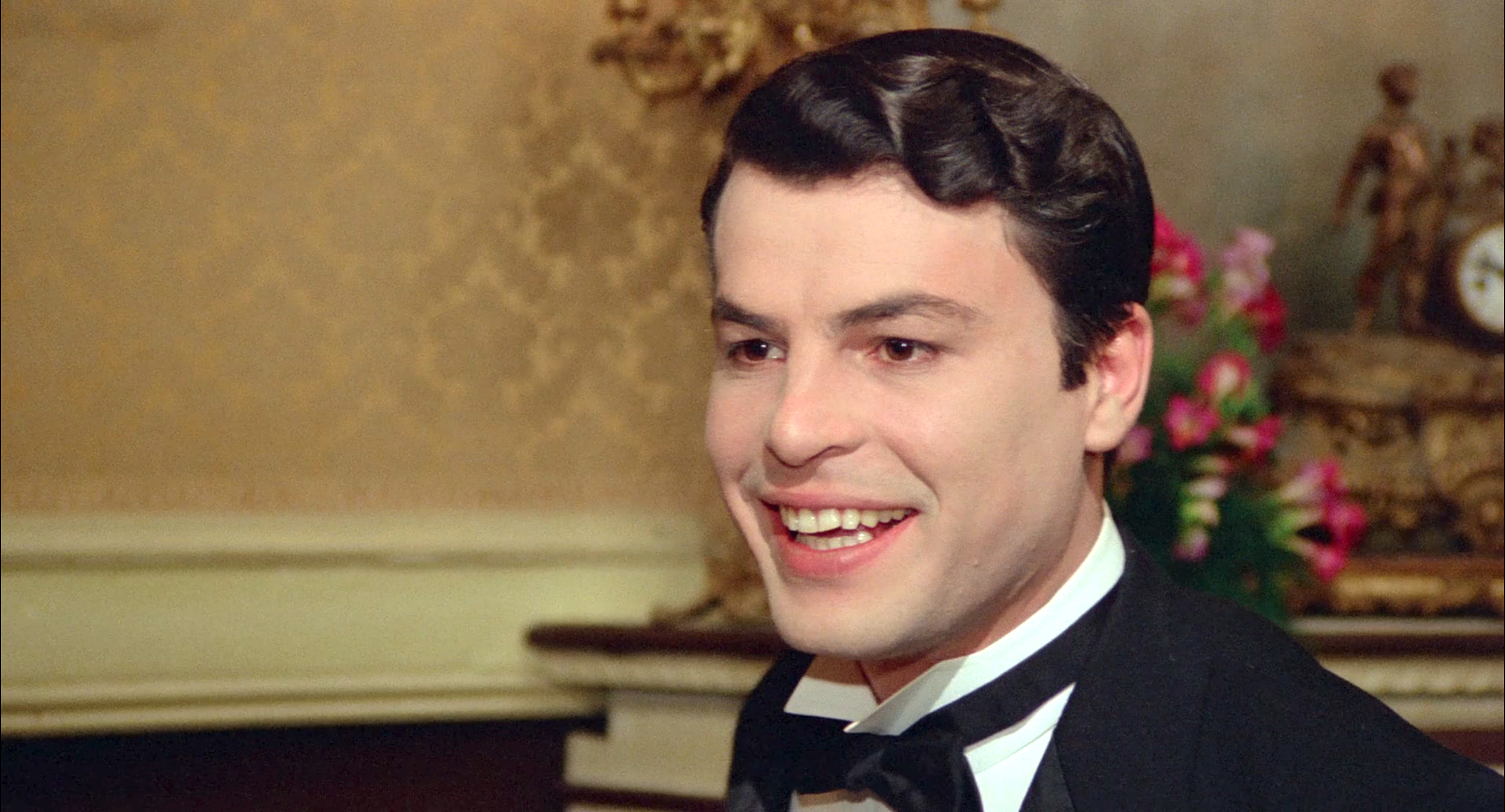
Michele Placido plays Beppe Catanìa, the suspected head of the syndicate behind the kidnappings, who is kidnapped for ransom by Turi Cantalamessa, a former CIA operative hired by Fulvia Block.

Fulvia Block, a beautiful, fabulously rich, and iron-willed Italian socialite, has an aggressive solution to Italy’s recent spate of kidnappings of rich Italians for exorbitant ransoms. She has hired Turi Cantalamessa, a former CIA operative, to kidnap Beppe Catanìa, the suspected head of the syndicate that is suspected to be behind the kidnappings, to demand a ransom equal to all the ransoms that have been collected by the syndicate thus far. Turi is initially skeptical of her plan, describing the illegalities and myriad risks. Fulvia overwhelms him with a screed on the class warfare behind the kidnappings, and he finally accedes to her plan.

Turi succeeds in kidnapping Beppe Catanìa and flies him, bound and blindfolded, to Fulvia’s secluded Sardinian renaissance fortress estate, where accommodations have been made—according to Fulvia’s plans—to hold Beppe in restraints. Addressing Beppe via closed circuit TV, to keep her identity hidden, Fulvia informs Beppe of the high ransom the syndicate will have to pay to retrieve him. He is to write a letter to the syndicate instructing them to pay the ransom. Fulvia goes into one of her rants on how the wealthy class is being victimized by socialist-leaning factions. Beppe is dismissive of Fulvia, scornful both of her social class and her sex, and vowing to get his revenge on her. Despite Beppe’s dismissive attitude toward her, Fulvia is impressed by his physical beauty, his lack of submission, and savage defiance toward his bondage.

A few days later, Beppe manages to escape his chains, still handcuffed and blindfolded with a locked device, stumbling through the island wilderness, attempting to flee. Turi and his guards recapture Beppe, and Fulvia determines that he needs a period of taming, restricted to bread and water, until he can again be approached to cooperate. Meanwhile Fulvia takes off for a few weeks with her lover, whom she now finds obsequious in his constant devotion and sexual eagerness to please.

Upon her return, Fulvia is alarmed to find a still defiant, but physically weakened Beppe, who has had nothing but bread and water for a month. She orders accommodations to strengthen his condition, including granting his request for a prostitute. Fulvia arranges for two prostitutes, and she secretly joins them so she can have a close encounter with Beppe without revealing herself. Each of his three choices (including Fulvia) kisses and fondles a blindfolded Beppe. When Beppe grabs Fulvia, she attempts to withdraw, but Beppe declares that he wants the shy one who keeps pulling away. Now aroused, Fulvia waves the others away. Beppe declares that he suspects she may be his captor-- and that regardless, he is pretending that she is because it excites him to think so. Fulvia is excited by this masquerade, and she and Beppe engage in a night of intense passion. When Beppe falls asleep, Fulvia slips away.

Turi Cantalamessa, who has become enamored of Fulvia, is jealous of her infatuation with Beppe and pushes her to complete the mission. The ransom has been paid by the syndicate, and Beppe is released to his former life. Fulvia is feted and celebrated by her billionaire class for having recovered all the ransoms previously paid by them, but Fulvia disillusions them, announcing that she will keep 50% of the millions in recovered ransoms, since she took the risks. They reluctantly agree that 50% recovery is better than none.

In the next scene, a helicopter hovers over the Sardinian island estate, and a team of commandos jumps out, capturing both Fulvia and Turi. Beppe Catanìa appears riding on horseback and announces that they are now HIS hostages with a ransom to be paid for them to exceed that paid for him. With a wink to Fulvia, he lifts her onto horseback behind him. Far from being reluctant, Fulvia seems pleased to see him, but Turi seems dejected at having to witness their reunion. As Fulvia and Beppe ride off along the shoreline, she lectures him on class issues.

== Cast ==
- Mariangela Melato as Fulvia Block
- Michele Placido as Beppe Catanìa
- Roberto Herlitzka as Turi Cantalamessa
- Massimo Wertmüller as Miki
- John Steiner as Frederick, Fulvia's lover
- Arnaldo Ninchi as Fulvia's secretary

== See also ==
- List of submissions to the 59th Academy Awards for Best Foreign Language Film
- List of Italian submissions for the Academy Award for Best Foreign Language Film
