= Flora Carabella =

Italian actress (1926–1999)

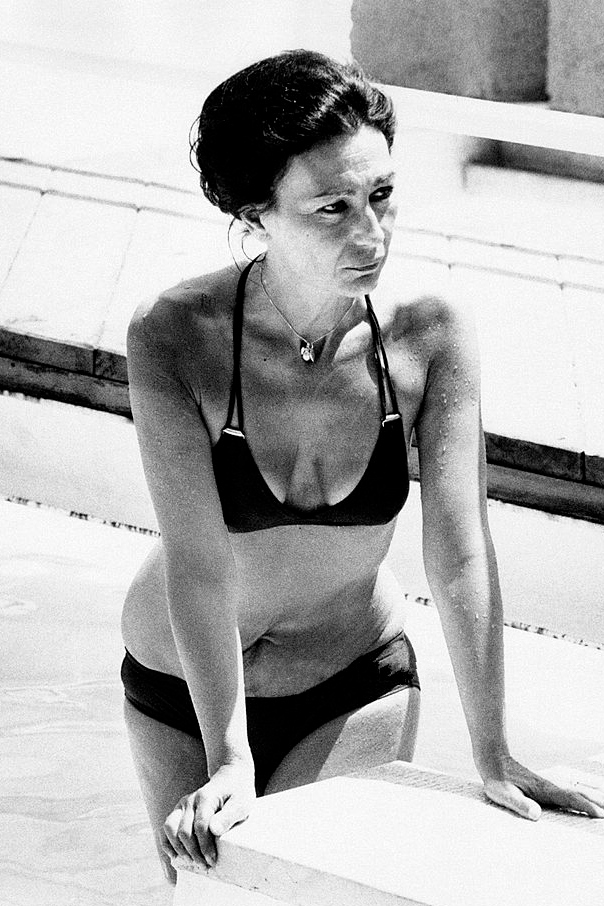
- Carabella in 1973
- Born: 15 February 1926; Rome, Kingdom of Italy
- Died: 19 April 1999 (aged 73); Rome, Italy
- Occupation: Actress
- Spouse: Marcello Mastroianni (m. 1950; sep. 1964)
- Children: 1

Flora Carabella (15 February 1926 – 19 April 1999) was an Italian film, television and stage actress.

== Life and career ==
Born in Rome, the daughter of the composer Ezio, Carabella studied acting at the Silvio d'Amico Academy of Dramatic Arts and began working as an actress on stage, first with Orazio Costa and then in the company of Luchino Visconti. In 1950 she married Marcello Mastroianni, from whom she never filed for divorce, in spite of Mastroianni's well-known romantic relationships. They had a daughter, Barbara. In 1976 Carabella reportedly offered to adopt her estranged husband's daughter by Catherine Deneuve, Chiara Mastroianni, whose parents' careers were demanding. Carabella's intermittent career includes films by Roberto Rossellini, Lina Wertmüller and Sergio Citti. She died in 1999, aged 73, of a bone tumor.

== Partial filmography ==
- The Lizards (1963) - Luciana Bonfanti
- The Messiah (1975) - Herodias
- Lunatics and Lovers (1976) - Aunt Luisa
- Beach House (1977) - La nonna
- A Night Full of Rain (1978) - Friend
- Viuuulentemente mia (1982) - Elvira - Anna's mother
- Journey with Papa (1982) - Luciana
- State buoni se potete (1983)
- La Cage aux Folles 3: The Wedding (1985)
- Donne in un giorno di festa (1993) - Suor Faustina
- Quando finiranno le zanzare (1994) - (final film role)
