= Aldo Puglisi =

Italian actor (1935–2024)

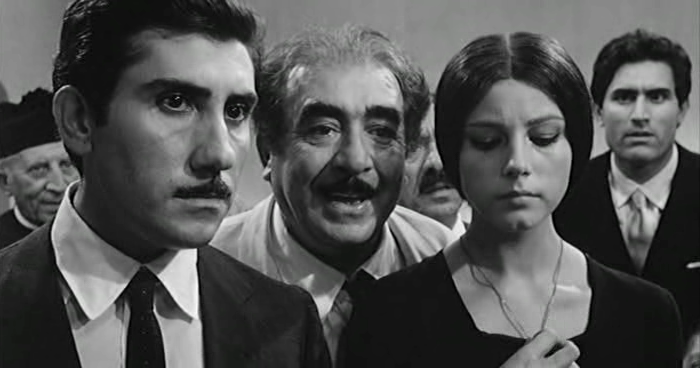
- Puglisi (left) with Saro Urzì, Stefania Sandrelli and Lando Buzzanca in Seduced and Abandoned (1964)
- Born: 12 April 1935; Catania, Italy
- Died: 19 July 2024 (aged 89); Catania, Italy
- Occupation: Actor

Aldo Puglisi (12 April 1935 – 19 July 2024) was an Italian actor.

== Life and career ==
Born in Catania, the son of two Sicilian language theatrical actors, Puglisi made his stage debut at very young age with the company of his parents. He made his film debut in a main role, as the vile seducer Peppino Califano in Pietro Germi's Seduced and Abandoned. Starting from his following film, Puglisi was gradually cast in less important roles, that led him to dedicate himself to theatre. Puglisi died of COVID-19 in Catania, on 19 July 2024, at the age of 89.

== Selected filmography ==
- Seduced and Abandoned (1964) – Peppino Califano
- Three Nights of Love (1964) – (segment "La vedova")
- Marriage Italian Style (1964) – Alfredo
- Letti sbagliati (1965) – Maurizio (segment "Quel porco di Maurizio")
- Latin Lovers (1965) – Saro (segment "L'irreparabile")
- The Birds, the Bees and the Italians (1966) – Carabiniere Mancuso
- Peggio per me... meglio per te (1967) – Giorgio de Santis
- The Girl with the Pistol (1968) – Un emigrante siciliano
- Vacanze sulla Costa Smeralda (1968) – Tiberio, Gianna's fiancé
- Love and Anger (1969) – Dio (segment "La sequenza del fiore di carta") (voice)
- Un caso di coscienza (1970) – ragionier Licasio
- Secret Fantasy (1971) – Chemist
- When Women Lost Their Tails (1972) – Zog
- The Eroticist (1972) – Carmelino the chauffeur
- All Screwed Up (1974) – Cook
- Swept Away (1974) – Gennarino's fellow
- Il giustiziere di mezzogiorno (1975) – Fernando
- La prima notte di nozze (1976)
- Arrivano i gatti (1980) – Tenente La Pezza
- Secret File (2003)
- Quell'estate felice (2007) – (final film role)
