= The Lizards =

1963 Italian film

- Directed by: Lina Wertmüller
- Written by: Lina Wertmüller
- Produced by: Lionello Santi
- Cinematography: Gianni Di Venanzo
- Edited by: Ruggero Mastroianni
- Music by: Ennio Morricone
- Production companies: Galatea Film; Società Editoriale Cinematografica Italiana 22 Dicembre
- Distributed by: Cineriz
- Release date: 1963
- Running time: 85 minutes
- Country: Italy
- Language: Italian
- Budget: £28,000

The Lizards, also known as The Basilisks (Italian: I basilischi), is a 1963 Italian comedy drama film written and directed by Lina Wertmüller. Filmed in the small towns of Minervino Murge and Spinazzola in Apulia and the small agricultural town Palazzo San Gervasio in Basilicata, it was Wertmüller's directorial debut, with a reported budget of £28,000.

== Plot ==
Francesco, Sergio, and Antonio are three privileged young individuals residing in a typical provincial town, namely Minervino Murge (at that time in the province of Bari and since 2009 in the province of Barletta-Andria-Trani), located between Apulia and Basilicata. The film portrays their lives, now saturated with apathy and provincialism, hindering any genuine desire to pursue more stimulating horizons. When Antonio's aunt, an indifferent university student, offers him the opportunity to live with her in Rome and transfer his enrollment from the University of Bari to the capital, he eventually declines. Incapable of abandoning the ingrained prejudices, stereotypes, and rituals of his native province, he returns to the village, his decision irreversible. The conclusion features a quote from the Southern Italian scholar Giustino Fortunato: "We are what race, climate, location, and history have determined us to be."

== Cast ==
- Antonio Petruzzi as Tony
- Stefano Satta Flores as Francesco
- Sergio Ferrarino as Sergio
- Luigi Barbieri as Antonio's father
- Flora Carabella as Luciana Bonfanti

== Legacy ==
Wertmüller, who had worked as assistant director for Federico Fellini on 8½ (1963), made her directorial debut and also wrote the story and screenplay. She won the "Silver Sail" at the 1963 Locarno Film Festival and subsequently won awards in London and Taormina. In addition to being Wertmüller's debut, it was one of the first roles of Satta Flores and Clarabella, Santa Flores' classmate and future wife of Marcello Mastroianni. Wertmüller also voiced numerous supporting characters. She shot the film in Minervino Murge, a town in the Altopiano delle Murge region on the border with Basilicata. Wertmüller was inspired to make the film after visiting her father's hometown, Palazzo San Gervasio, which she described as "the discovery of a world, of that part of Italy cut off from the routes of so many wars and from history". In 2008, I basilischi was shown as part of the retrospective "Questi fantasmi: Cinema italiano ritrovato" at the 65th Venice International Film Festival. A 4K restoration of the film was screened at the Museum of Modern Art in December 2023.
