= Blood Feud (1978 film) =

1978 film

- Film poster
- Directed by: Lina Wertmüller
- Written by: Lina Wertmüller
- Produced by: Arrigo Colombo
- Starring: Sophia Loren; Marcello Mastroianni; Giancarlo Giannini
- Cinematography: Tonino Delli Colli
- Edited by: Franco Fraticelli
- Production companies: Lord Grade; Harry Colombo Production; ITC Entertainment; Liberty Film
- Distributed by: Titanus (Italy); Associated Film Distribution (USA English version)
- Release date: 21 December 1978 (Italy)
- Running time: 96 minutes
- Countries: Italy; United Kingdom
- Languages: Italian; English

Blood Feud (Italian: Fatto di sangue fra due uomini per causa di una vedova, si sospettano moventi politici, and also known as Revenge) is a 1978 thriller film directed by Lina Wertmüller. The film's full name is Un fatto di sangue nel comune di Siculiana fra due uomini per causa di una vedova. Si sospettano moventi politici. Amore-Morte-Shimmy. Lugano belle. Tarantelle. Tarallucci e vino.. The film received a Guinness World Record for the film with the longest title.

== Cast ==
- Sophia Loren as Titina Paternò
- Marcello Mastroianni as Rosario Maria Spallone
- Giancarlo Giannini as Nicola Sanmichele alias 'Nick'
- Turi Ferro as Vito Acicatena
- Mario Scarpetta as Tonino
- Antonella Murgia as The pregnant girl
- Lucio Amelio as Dr. Crisafulli
- Maria Carrara as Donna Santa
- Isa Danieli as The expatriate
- Guido Cerniglia as The city manager
- Vittorio Baratti as The pharmacist
- Oreste Radi as The schoolmaster
- Tomas Arana as a fascist (uncredited)
- Tito Palma as Tutino (uncredited)
