= A Joke of Destiny =

1983 film

- 1983 film poster for Scherzo del destino
- Directed by: Lina Wertmüller
- Written by: Agenore Incrocci; Lina Wertmüller
- Produced by: Giuseppe Giovannini
- Starring: Ugo Tognazzi
- Cinematography: Camillo Bazzoni
- Edited by: Franco Fraticelli
- Music by: Paolo Conte
- Release date: 30 September 1983
- Running time: 105 minutes
- Country: Italy
- Language: Italian

A Joke of Destiny (Italian: Scherzo del destino in agguato dietro l'angolo come un brigante da strada) is a 1983 Italian comedy film directed by Lina Wertmüller. It was entered into the 14th Moscow International Film Festival.

== Synopsis ==
Chaos reigns as the interior minister is stuck in his highly futuristic car and a rival parliamentarian desperately tries to help him.

== Cast ==
- Ugo Tognazzi as On. Vincenzo De Andreiis
- Piera Degli Esposti as Maria Theresa De Andreiis
- Gastone Moschin as Ministro degli interni
- Roberto Herlitzka as Dr. Crisafulli, segretario
- Renzo Montagnani as Capitano Pautasso della DIGOS
- Enzo Jannacci as Gigi Pedrinelli, brigatista
- Valeria Golino as Adalgisa De Andreiis
- Massimo Wertmüller as Beniamino
- Pina Cei as Donna Sofia
