= A Night Full of Rain =

1978 film by Lina Wertmüller

- Theatrical release poster
- Italian: La fine del mondo nel nostro solito letto in una notte piena di pioggia
- Directed by: Lina Wertmüller
- Written by: Lina Wertmüller
- Produced by: Gil Shiva
- Starring: Giancarlo Giannini; Candice Bergen
- Cinematography: Giuseppe Rotunno
- Edited by: Franco Fraticelli
- Music by: Roberto De Simone
- Production companies: Liberty Film; Canafox Films
- Distributed by: Warner Bros.
- Release dates: 17 January 1978 (Italy); 29 January 1978 (New York City)
- Running time: 104 minutes
- Countries: Italy; United States
- Language: English

A Night Full of Rain (Italian: La fine del mondo nel nostro solito letto in una notte piena di pioggia, lit. 'The End of the World in Our Usual Bed on a Night Full of Rain') is a 1978 romantic drama film written and directed by Lina Wertmüller, starring Giancarlo Giannini and Candice Bergen. The plot concerns a romantic and heart-breaking relationship between a chauvinist Italian journalist and a feminist American photographer.

An international co-production between Italy and the United States, the film was shot in Rome, Calabria and Padua, Italy, as well as in San Francisco and Vancouver. It was Wertmüller's first film with original English-language dialogue.

In 1978, the film was entered into the 28th Berlin International Film Festival.

== Plot ==
An American tourist, her head full of Marcuse and radical politics, gets involved in a violent confrontation during a Catholic procession in a small Italian village, seeking to protect an Italian girl. An Italian man, attracted to her, tries to help. As they escape to a magnificent abandoned cloister, the man, a communist, tries to seduce the American by quoting Dante. She refuses him when she realizes his insincerity, and he ends up almost raping her, but she escapes. Randomly meeting later in San Francisco, the guy hits on her again and eventually they get married. Their marriage however is troubled.

== Cast ==
- Giancarlo Giannini as Paolo
- Candice Bergen as Lizzy
- Michael Tucker as Friend
- Mario Scarpetta as Friend
- Lucio Amelio as Friend
- Massimo Wertmüller as Friend
- Anny Papa as Friend
- Anne Byrne Hoffman as Friend
- Flora Carabella as Friend
- Anita Paltrinieri as Friend
- Giuliana Carnescecchi as Friend
- Alice Colombo Oxman as Friend
- Jill Eikenberry
- Paola Ojetti
- Enzo Vitale
- Paola Silvia Rotunno
- John West Buchanan
- Lilli Carati (as Ileana Caravati)
- Alison Tucker

== Reception ==
Film critic John Simon described A Night Full of Rain as an "almost total failure".
