= Peggio per me... meglio per te =

- Directed by: Bruno Corbucci
- Written by: Dino Verde; Bruno Corbucci
- Produced by: Edmondo Amati
- Starring: Little Tony
- Cinematography: Riccardo Pallottini
- Edited by: Sergio Montanari
- Music by: Willy Brezza
- Release date: 1967
- Country: Italy
- Language: Italian

Peggio per me... meglio per te (Italian for Worse for me ... better for you) is a 1967 Italian "musicarello" film directed by Bruno Corbucci. It is named after Little Tony's hit song "Peggio per me".

== Cast ==
- Little Tony as Tony Romanelli
- Katia Christine as Marisa
- Gianni Agus as Baron Marcianò
- Aldo Puglisi as Giorgio De Santis
- Maria Pia Conte as Gabriella
- Leo Gavero as Marinotti a.k.a. 'Califfo'
- Lucretia Love as Vanessa
- Antonella Steni as Adriana
