= Camorra (1986 film) =

1986 film

Camorra (A Story of Streets, Women and Crime)
- Film poster
- Directed by: Lina Wertmüller
- Written by: Lina Wertmüller; Elvio Porta
- Produced by: Yoram Globus; Menahem Golan
- Starring: Ángela Molina; Harvey Keitel
- Cinematography: Giuseppe Lanci
- Edited by: Michael J. Duthie; Luigi Zitta
- Music by: Tony Esposito
- Distributed by: Cannon Films
- Release date: 24 January 1986
- Running time: 115 minutes
- Country: Italy
- Language: Italian

Camorra (A Story of Streets, Women and Crime) (Italian: Un complicato intrigo di donne, vicoli e delitti) is a 1986 Italian crime film directed by Lina Wertmüller. It was entered into the 36th Berlin International Film Festival.

== Plot ==
Hostel owner Annunziata (Ángela Molina) is attacked, but before her assailant can sexually assault her, the man is killed. The killer plunges a hypodermic needle into one of the rapist's testicles and escapes before Annunziata is able to identify him. This soon becomes the signature of a serial killer who appears to be targeting drug dealers.

== Cast ==
- Ángela Molina as Annunziata
- Harvey Keitel as Frankie
- Isa Danieli as Carmela
- Paolo Bonacelli as Tango
- Elvio Porta
- Vittorio Squillante as Tony
- Muzzi Loffredo
- Mario Scarpetta
- Tommaso Bianco as Baba
- Raffaele Verita
- Franco Angrisano
- Sebastiano Nardone
- Pino Ammendola as O' Dimonio
- Anny Papa as (as Anni Papa)
- Francisco Rabal as Guaglione
- Daniel Ezralow as "Toto"
- Lorraine Bracco (uncredited)
