= Crystal or Ash, Fire or Wind, as Long as It's Love =

- Directed by: Lina Wertmüller
- Written by: Rutger Hauer; Lina Wertmüller; Roberta Colombo
- Produced by: Tarak Ben Ammar; Fulvio Lucisano
- Starring: Rutger Hauer
- Cinematography: Carlo Tafani
- Edited by: Pierluigi Leonardi
- Music by: Pino D'Angiò; Italo Greco
- Release date: 1989
- Running time: 110'
- Countries: Italy, France
- Languages: English; Italian
- Budget: $6-7 million

In una notte di chiaro di luna (internationally released as Crystal or Ash, Fire or Wind, as Long as It's Love, also known as On a Moonlit Night and As Long as It's Love) is a 1989 Italian drama film directed by Lina Wertmüller. It entered the competition at the 46th Venice International Film Festival.

== Production ==
Principal photography for the film began in New York on 30 January 1989. Scenes were also shot in Paris, Rome, Venice, and London. The film was made on a budget of $6–7 million. Producer Fulvio Lucisano secured financing through Italian and French distributors after at least one major American studio declined to back the project, citing unease over its focus on AIDS.

Director Wertmüller described the film as her first film without irony, which was a trademark of her earlier work. She framed it as a love story shaped by the central character's HIV-positive status, focusing on the redemptive power of love. The script was revised during development because an early version linked the protagonist's infection to bisexuality, but Wertmüller removed this in favour of heterosexual transmission, because of the stigma associated with AIDS as a punishment for "immoral behavior". Both Wertmüller and Dunaway cited Susan Sontag's AIDS and Its Metaphors as an influence.

== Cast ==
- Rutger Hauer as John Knott
- Nastassja Kinski as Joëlle
- Dominique Sanda as Carol
- Peter O'Toole as Professor McShoul
- Faye Dunaway as Mrs. Colbert
- George Eastman as Zaccarias
- Massimo Wertmuller as Max
- Giuseppe Cederna
