= David Bowie (disambiguation) =

David Bowie (1947–2016) was an English musician and actor.

David Bowie may also refer to:

- David Bowie (1967 album), his eponymous 1967 album
- David Bowie (1969 album), his eponymous 1969 album
- David Bowie (box set), box set of his albums released in 2007
- "David Bowie", a song from the 1989 album Junta by Phish

== See also ==
- David Bowe (disambiguation)
- David Zowie (born 1981), English DJ and record producer
- Heteropoda davidbowie, spider named after David Bowie
