= List of Academy Award winners and nominees from Italy =

This is a list of Italian Academy Award winners and nominees. This list details the performances of Italian filmmakers, actors, and films that have either been nominated or have won an Academy Award.

== Best Actor in a Leading Role ==
This list focuses on Italian-born actors.

Best Actor
Year	Name	Film	Status	Milestone / Notes
1962	Marcello Mastroianni	Divorce Italian Style	Nominated	
1976	Robert De Niro	Taxi Driver	Nominated	De Niro is an US-born actor who acquired the Italian citizenship in 2006.
1976	Giancarlo Giannini	Seven Beauties	Nominated	
1977	Marcello Mastroianni	A Special Day	Nominated	
1978	Robert De Niro	The Deer Hunter	Nominated	
1980	Robert De Niro	Raging Bull	Won	
1987	Marcello Mastroianni	Dark Eyes	Nominated	Most nominated actor for foreign language performances.
1990	Robert De Niro	Awakenings	Nominated	
1991	Robert De Niro	Cape Fear	Nominated	
1995	Massimo Troisi	Il Postino: The Postman	Nominated	Posthumous nomination.
1998	Roberto Benigni	Life Is Beautiful	Won	First Italian actor to win Best Lead Actor for a foreign language performance.
2009	Colin Firth	A Single Man	Nominated	Firth is a British-born actor who acquired the Italian citizenship in 2017.
2010	Colin Firth	The King's Speech	Won	
2018	Willem Dafoe	At Eternity's Gate	Nominated	Dafoe is an American-born actor who acquired Italian citizenship in 2022.

== Best Actor in a Supporting Role ==
This list focuses on Italian-born or with Italian citizenship actors.

Best Supporting Actor
Year	Name	Film	Status	Milestone / Notes
1957	Vittorio De Sica	A Farewell to Arms	Nominated	First Italian man to be nominated for an acting award.
1973	Vincent Gardenia	Bang the Drum Slowly	Nominated	
1974	Robert De Niro	The Godfather Part II	Won	
1986	Willem Dafoe	Platoon	Nominated	
1987	Vincent Gardenia	Moonstruck	Nominated	
2000	Willem Dafoe	Shadow of the Vampire	Nominated	
2013	Robert De Niro	Silver Linings Playbook	Nominated	
2017	Willem Dafoe	The Florida Project	Nominated	
2023	Robert De Niro	Killers of the Flower Moon	Nominated	

== Best Actress in a Leading Role ==
This list focuses on Italian-born actresses.

Best Actress
Year	Name	Film	Status	Milestone / Notes
1955	Anna Magnani	The Rose Tattoo	Won	First Italian actress to win for Best Actress.
1957	Anna Magnani	Wild Is the Wind	Nominated	
1960	Sophia Loren	Two Women	Won	Second Italian actress to be nominated. First Italian actress to win for Best Actress in an Italian-language film. First individual to win for a foreign-language performance.
1964	Sophia Loren	Marriage Italian Style	Nominated	

== Best Actress in a Supporting Role ==
This list focuses on Italian-born actresses.

Best Supporting Actress
Year	Name	Film	Status	Milestone / Notes
1955	Marisa Pavan	The Rose Tattoo	Nominated	
1973	Valentina Cortese	Day for Night (La nuit américaine)	Nominated	
2024	Isabella Rossellini	Conclave	Nominated	

== Best Animated Feature ==
This list focuses on Italian-born directors.

Best Animated Feature
Year	Name	Film	Status	Milestone / Notes
2021	Enrico Casarosa	Luca	Nominated	First Italian director to receive a nomination for an animated feature.

== Best Production Design ==
This list focuses on Italian-born art directors.

Name	Year	Award	Film	Result
Charles Novi	1943	Best Art Direction – Color	The Desert Song	Nominated
Gabriel Scognamillo	1953	Best Art Direction – Color	The Story of Three Loves	Nominated
Arrigo Breschi	1960	Best Art Direction – Color	It Started in Naples	Nominated
Veniero Colasanti	1961	Best Art Direction – Color	El Cid	Nominated
Piero Gherardi	1961	Best Art Direction – Black-and-White	The Sweet Life (La dolce vita)	Nominated
Dario Simoni	1962	Best Art Direction – Color	Lawrence of Arabia	Won
Piero Gherardi	1963	Best Art Direction – Black-and-White	8½	Nominated
Dario Simoni	1965	Best Art Direction – Color	Doctor Zhivago	Won
Dario Simoni	1965	Best Art Direction – Color	The Agony and the Ecstasy	Nominated
Luigi Scaccianoce	1966	Best Art Direction – Black-and-White	The Gospel According to St. Matthew	Nominated
Piero Gherardi	1966	Best Art Direction – Color	Juliet of the Spirits (Giulietta degli spiriti)	Nominated
Mario Chiari	1967	Best Art Direction/Set Decoration	Doctor Dolittle	Nominated
Renzo Mongiardino; Giuseppe Mariani; Dario Simoni; Luigi Gervasi	1967	Best Art Direction/Set Decoration	The Taming of the Shrew	Nominated
Lorenzo Mongiardino; Carmelo Patrono; Gianni Quaranta	1972	Best Art Direction/Set Decoration	Brother Sun, Sister Moon (Fratello sole, sorella luna)	Nominated
Gianni Quaranta; Franco Zeffirelli	1987	Best Art Direction/Set Decoration	La Traviata	Nominated
Elio Altramura; Gianni Quaranta	1987	Best Art Direction/Set Decoration	A Room with a View	Won
Bruno Cesari; Osvaldo Desideri; Ferdinando Scarfiotti	1987	Best Art Direction/Set Decoration	The Last Emperor	Won
Bruno Rubeo	1989	Best Art Direction/Set Decoration	Driving Miss Daisy	Nominated
Dante Ferretti; Francesca Lo Schiavo	1989	Best Art Direction/Set Decoration	The Adventures of Baron Munchausen	Nominated
Dante Ferretti; Francesca Lo Schiavo	1990	Best Art Direction/Set Decoration	Hamlet	Nominated
Ferdinando Scarfiotti	1992	Best Art Direction/Set Decoration	Toys	Nominated
Luciana Arrighi	1992	Best Art Direction/Set Decoration	Howards End	Won
Luciana Arrighi	1993	Best Art Direction/Set Decoration	The Remains of the Day	Nominated
Dante Ferretti	1993	Best Art Direction/Set Decoration	The Age of Innocence	Nominated
Dante Ferretti; Francesca Lo Schiavo	1994	Best Art Direction/Set Decoration	Interview with the Vampire	Nominated
Dante Ferretti; Francesca Lo Schiavo	1997	Best Art Direction/Set Decoration	Kundun	Nominated
Bruno Cesari	1999	Best Art Direction/Set Decoration	The Talented Mr. Ripley	Nominated
Luciana Arrighi	1999	Best Art Direction/Set Decoration	Anna and the King	Nominated
Dante Ferretti; Francesca Lo Schiavo	2002	Best Art Direction/Set Decoration	Gangs of New York	Nominated
Dante Ferretti; Francesca Lo Schiavo	2004	Best Art Direction	The Aviator	Won
Dante Ferretti; Francesca Lo Schiavo	2007	Best Art Direction	Sweeney Todd: The Demon Barber of Fleet Street	Won
Dante Ferretti; Francesca Lo Schiavo	2011	Best Art Direction	Hugo	Won
Alessandra Querzola	2017	Best Production Design	Blade Runner 2049	Nominated

== Best Cinematography ==
This list focuses on Italian-born cinematographers.

Name	Year	Award	Film	Result
Tony Gaudio (shared with Harry Perry)	1930	Best Cinematography	Hell's Angels	Nominated
Tony Gaudio	1936	Best Cinematography	Anthony Adverse	Won
Joseph A. Valentine	1937	Best Cinematography	Wings over Honolulu	Nominated
Joseph A. Valentine	1938	Best Cinematography	Mad About Music	Nominated
Joseph A. Valentine	1939	Best Cinematography – black and white	First Love	Nominated
Sol Polito	1939	Best Cinematography – color	The Private Lives of Elizabeth and Essex	Nominated
Tony Gaudio	1939	Best Cinematography – black and white	Juarez	Nominated
Joseph A. Valentine	1940	Best Cinematography – black and white	Spring Parade	Nominated
Tony Gaudio	1940	Best Cinematography – black and white	The Letter	Nominated
Sol Polito	1941	Best Cinematography – black and white	Sergeant York	Nominated
Sol Polito	1942	Best Cinematography – color	Captains of the Clouds	Nominated
Tony Gaudio	1943	Best Cinematography – black and white	Corvette K-225	Nominated
Tony Gaudio (shared with Allen M. Davey)	1945	Best Cinematography – color	A Song to Remember	Nominated
Joseph A. Valentine (shared with William V. Skall and Winton Hoch)	1948	Best Cinematography – color	Joan of Arc	Won
Nicholas Musuraca	1948	Best Cinematography – black and white	I Remember Mama	Nominated
Pasqualino De Santis	1968	Best Cinematography	Romeo and Juliet	Won
Vittorio Storaro	1979	Best Cinematography	Apocalypse Now	Won
Giuseppe Rotunno	1979	Best Cinematography	All That Jazz	Nominated
Vittorio Storaro	1981	Best Cinematography	Reds	Won
Vittorio Storaro	1987	Best Cinematography	The Last Emperor	Won
Vittorio Storaro	1990	Best Cinematography	Dick Tracy	Nominated
Dante Spinotti	1997	Best Cinematography	L.A. Confidential	Nominated
Dante Spinotti	1999	Best Cinematography	The Insider	Nominated
Mauro Fiore	2009	Best Cinematography	Avatar	Won

== Best Costume Design ==
This list focuses on Italian-born costume designers.

Name	Year	Award	Film	Result
Vittorio Nino Novarese	1949	Best Costume Design – Black-and-White	Prince of Foxes	Nominated
Maria De Matteis	1956	Best Costume Design – Color	War and Peace	Nominated
Piero Gherardi	1960	Best Costume Design – Black-and-White	La dolce vita	Won
Piero Gherardi	1963	Best Costume Design – Black-and-White	8½	Won
Vittorio Nino Novarese	1963	Best Costume Design – Color	Cleopatra	Won
Piero Tosi	1963	Best Costume Design – Color	The Leopard	Nominated
Vittorio Nino Novarese	1965	Best Costume Design – Color	The Agony and the Ecstasy	Nominated
Vittorio Nino Novarese	1965	Best Costume Design – Color	The Greatest Story Ever Told	Nominated
Piero Gherardi	1966	Best Costume Design – Color	Juliet of the Spirits	Nominated
Danilo Donati	1966	Best Costume Design – Black-and-White	The Gospel According to St. Matthew	Nominated
Danilo Donati	1966	Best Costume Design – Black-and-White	The Mandrake	Nominated
Danilo Donati	1967	Best Costume Design	The Taming of the Shrew	Nominated
Danilo Donati	1968	Best Costume Design	Romeo and Juliet	Won
Vittorio Nino Novarese	1970	Best Costume Design	Cromwell	Won
Piero Tosi	1971	Best Costume Design	Death in Venice	Nominated
Piero Tosi	1973	Best Costume Design	Ludwig	Nominated
Milena Canonero shared with Ulla-Britt Söderlund	1975	Best Costume Design	Barry Lyndon	Won
Danilo Donati	1976	Best Costume Design	Fellini's Casanova	Won
Ambra Danon; Piero Tosi	1979	Best Costume Design	La Cage aux Folles	Nominated
Milena Canonero	1981	Best Costume Design	Chariots of Fire	Won
Piero Tosi	1982	Best Costume Design	La traviata	Nominated
Milena Canonero	1985	Best Costume Design	Out of Africa	Nominated
Enrico Sabbatini	1986	Best Costume Design	The Mission	Nominated
Anna Anni; Maurizio Millenotti	1986	Best Costume Design	Otello	Nominated
Milena Canonero	1988	Best Costume Design	Tucker: The Man and His Dream	Nominated
Gabriella Pescucci	1988	Best Costume Design	The Adventures of Baron Munchausen	Nominated
Milena Canonero	1990	Best Costume Design	Dick Tracy	Nominated
Maurizio Millenotti	1990	Best Costume Design	Hamlet	Nominated
Franca Squarciapino	1990	Best Costume Design	Cyrano de Bergerac	Won
Gabriella Pescucci	1993	Best Costume Design	The Age of Innocence	Won
Dante Ferretti	1997	Best Costume Design	Kundun	Nominated
Milena Canonero	1999	Best Costume Design	Titus	Nominated
Milena Canonero	2001	Best Costume Design	The Affair of the Necklace	Nominated
Gabriella Pescucci	2005	Best Costume Design	Charlie and the Chocolate Factory	Nominated
Milena Canonero	2006	Best Costume Design	Marie Antoinette	Won
Antonella Cannarozzi	2009	Best Costume Design	I Am Love	Nominated
Milena Canonero	2014	Best Costume Design	The Grand Budapest Hotel	Won
Massimo Cantini Parrini	2021	Best Costume Design	Pinocchio	Nominated
Massimo Cantini Parrini	2022	Best Costume Design	Cyrano	Nominated

== Best Director ==
This list focuses on Italian-born directors.

Name	Year	Award	Film	Result	Milestone/Notes
Frank Capra	1933	Best Director	Lady for a Day	Nominated	
Frank Capra	1934	Best Director	It Happened One Night	Won	
Frank Capra	1936	Best Director	Mr. Deeds Goes to Town	Won	
Frank Capra	1938	Best Director	You Can't Take It with You	Won	
Frank Capra	1939	Best Director	Mr. Smith Goes to Washington	Nominated	
Frank Capra	1946	Best Director	It's a Wonderful Life	Nominated	
Federico Fellini	1960	Best Director	La dolce vita	Nominated	
Pietro Germi	1961	Best Director	Divorce Italian Style	Nominated	
Federico Fellini	1963	Best Director	8½	Nominated	
Michelangelo Antonioni	1966	Best Director	Blowup	Nominated	
Gillo Pontecorvo	1968	Best Director	The Battle of Algiers	Nominated	
Franco Zeffirelli	1968	Best Director	Romeo and Juliet	Nominated	
Federico Fellini	1969	Best Director	Fellini Satyricon	Nominated	
Bernardo Bertolucci	1973	Best Director	Last Tango in Paris	Nominated	
Federico Fellini	1974	Best Director	Amarcord	Nominated	
Lina Wertmüller	1976	Best Director	Seven Beauties	Nominated	First female director nominated in this category.
Martin Scorsese	1980	Best Director	Raging Bull	Nominated	Scorsese is an US-born director who acquired the Italian citizenship
Bernardo Bertolucci	1987	Best Director	The Last Emperor	Won	
Martin Scorsese	1988	Best Director	The Last Temptations of Christ	Nominated	
Martin Scorsese	1990	Best Director	Goodfellas	Nominated	
Roberto Benigni	1998	Best Director	Life Is Beautiful	Nominated	
Martin Scorsese	2002	Best Director	Gangs of New York	Nominated	
Martin Scorsese	2004	Best Director	The Aviator	Nominated	
Martin Scorsese	2006	Best Director	The Departed	Won	
Martin Scorsese	2011	Best Director	Hugo	Nominated	
Martin Scorsese	2013	Best Director	The Wolf of Wall Street	Nominated	
Martin Scorsese	2019	Best Director	The Irishman	Nominated	
Martin Scorsese	2023	Best Director	Killers of the Flower Moon	Nominated	

== Best Documentary Feature ==
This list focuses on Italian-born producers/directors.

Year	Winner	Film	Status	Milestone / Notes
1961	Romolo Marcellini	The Grand Olympics	Nominated	
1968	Emile de Antonio	In the Year of the Pig	Nominated	
1976	Tony Ianzelo	High Grass Circus	Nominated	
2003	Luigi Falorni	The Story of the Weeping Camel	Nominated	Nominated with Byambasuren Davaa.
2016	Gianfranco Rosi; Donatella Palermo	Fire at Sea	Nominated	First Italian production to be nominated for Best Documentary

== Best Documentary Feature (Short Subject) ==
This list focuses on Italian-born producers/directors.

Year	Winner	Film	Status	Milestone / Notes
1952	Alberto Ancilotto	The Garden Spider	Nominated	
1972	Giorgio Treves	K-Z	Nominated	
1976	Tony Ianzelo	Blackwood	Nominated	

== Best Editing ==
This list focuses on Italian-born editors.

Academy Award for Best Film Editing
Year	Name	Film	Status	Milestone / Notes
1937	Basil Wrangell	The Good Earth	Nominated	Wrangell was an Italian born-American film editor.
1987	Gabriella Cristiani	The Last Emperor	Won	
1991	Pietro Scalia	JFK	Won	
1997	Pietro Scalia	Good Will Hunting	Nominated	
1997	Simona Paggi	Life Is Beautiful	Nominated	(Original title: La vita è bella)
2000	Pietro Scalia	Gladiator	Nominated	
2001	Pietro Scalia	Black Hawk Down	Won	

== Best Picture ==
This list focuses on Italian-born producers.

Year	Winner	Film	Status	Milestone / Notes
1946	Frank Capra	It's a Wonderful Life	Nominated	Capra was an Italian-born American producer.
1965	Carlo Ponti	Doctor Zhivago	Nominated	
1994	Gaetano Daniele; Mario C. Gori; Vittorio C. Gori	Il Postino: The Postman	Nominated	
1997	Uberto Pasolini	The Full Monty	Nominated	
1997	Gianluigi Braschi; Elda Ferri	Life Is Beautiful	Nominated	
2002	Alberto Grimaldi	Gangs of New York	Nominated	Nominated with Harvey Weinstein.
2011	Martin Scorsese	Hugo	Nominated	Nominated with Graham King
2013	Martin Scorsese	The Wolf of Wall Street	Nominated	Nominated with Leonardo DiCaprio, Emma Tillinger Koskoff, and Joey McFarland
2017	Luca Guadagnino; Marco Morabito	Call Me by Your Name	Nominated	Nominated with Peter Spears and Emilie Georges.
2019	Martin Scorsese; Robert De Niro	The Irishman	Nominated	Nominated with Jane Rosenthal and Emma Tillinger Koskoff
2023	Martin Scorsese	Killers of the Flower Moon	Nominated	Nominated with Dan Friedkin, Bradley Thomas, and Daniel Lupi

== Best International Feature Film ==
In this category, Italian films have 28 nominations, 11 wins, and 3 honorary awards. They have the most wins and the second most nominations after France.

Year	Film	Original title	Result
1946	Shoeshine	Sciuscià	Honorary Award
1948	Bicycle Thieves	Ladri di biciclette	Honorary Award
1949	The Walls of Malapaga	Le mura di Malapaga	Honorary Award
1954	La Strada	La Strada	Won
1957	Nights of Cabiria	Le notti di Cabiria	Won
1958	Big Deal on Madonna Street	I soliti ignoti	Nominated
1959	The Great War	La grande guerra	Nominated
1960	Kapo	Kapò	Nominated
1962	The Four Days of Naples	Le quattro giornate di Napoli	Nominated
1963	8½	Otte e mezzo	Won
1963	Yesterday, Today and Tomorrow	Ieri, oggi, domani	Won
1964	Marriage Italian Style	Matrimonio all'italiana	Nominated
1966	The Battle of Algiers	La battaglia di Algeri	Nominated
1968	The Girl with the Pistol	La ragazza con la pistola	Nominated
1970	Investigation of a Citizen Above Suspicion	Indagine su un cittadino al di sopra di ogni sospetto	Won
1970	The Garden of the Finzi-Continis	Il giardino dei Finzi Contini	Won
1973	Amarcord	Amarcord	Won
1974	Scent of a Woman	Profumo di donna	Nominated
1975	Seven Beauties	Pasqualino Settebellezze	Nominated
1977	A Special Day	Una giornata particolare	Nominated
1977	I nuovi mostri	I nuovi mostri	Nominated
1979	To Forget Venice	Dimenticare Venezia	Nominated
1981	Three Brothers	Tre fratelli	Nominated
1987	The Family	La famiglia	Nominated
1988	Cinema Paradiso	Nuovo Cinema Paradiso	Won
1990	Open Doors	Porte aperte	Nominated
1991	Mediterraneo	Mediterraneo	Won
1995	The Star Maker	L'uomo delle stelle	Nominated
1997	Life Is Beautiful	La vita è bella	Won
2005	Don't Tell	La bestia nel cuore	Nominated
2013	The Great Beauty	La grande bellezza	Won
2021	The Hand of God	È stata la mano di Dio	Nominated
2023	Io capitano	Io capitano	Nominated

== Best Makeup and Hairstyling ==
Academy Award for Best Makeup and Hairstyling
Year	Name	Film	Status	Milestone / Notes
1988	Fabrizio Sforza	The Adventures of Baron Munchausen	Nominated	Shared with Maggie Weston.
1989	Manlio Rocchetti	Driving Miss Daisy	Won	Shared with Lynn Barber and Kevin Haney. The first Italian to win this award.
2001	Aldo Signoretti; Maurizio Silvi	Moulin Rouge!	Nominated	
2006	Aldo Signoretti; Vittorio Sodano	Apocalypto	Nominated	
2008	Aldo Signoretti; Vittorio Sodano	Il divo	Nominated	
2016	Alessandro Bertolazzi; Giorgio Gregorini	Suicide Squad	Won	Alessandro Bertolazzi is an Italian-born English. Shared with Christopher Nelson.
2019	Dalia Colli; Francesco Pegoretti	Pinocchio	Nominated	Shared with Mark Coulier.
2023	Aldo Signoretti	Elvis	Nominated	Shared with Mark Coulier and Jason Baird.

== Best Music (Original Score) ==
This list focuses on scores by Italian-born composers.

Name	Year	Film	Result	Notes
Daniele Amfitheatrof	1945	Guest Wife	Nominated	
Daniele Amfitheatrof	1946	Song of the South	Nominated	Shared nomination with Paul J. Smith and Charles Wolcott.
Gian Carlo Menotti	1951	The Medium	Nominated	
Henry Mancini	1961	Breakfast at Tiffany's	Won	
Vince Guaraldi	1969	A Boy Named Charlie Brown	Nominated	
Henry Mancini	1970	Sunflower	Nominated	
Henry Mancini	1970	Darling Lili	Nominated	
Nino Rota	1974	The Godfather Part II	Won	Shared with Carmine Coppola.
Giorgio Moroder	1978	Midnight Express	Won	
Ennio Morricone	1978	Days of Heaven	Nominated	
Henry Mancini	1979	10	Nominated	
John Corigliano	1980	Altered States	Nominated	
Henry Mancini	1982	Victor/Victoria	Won	
Ennio Morricone	1986	The Mission	Nominated	
Ennio Morricone	1987	The Untouchables	Nominated	
Ennio Morricone	1991	Bugsy	Nominated	
Nicola Piovani	1997	Life Is Beautiful	Won	
John Corigliano	1998	The Red Violin	Won	
Ennio Morricone	2000	Malèna	Nominated	
Dario Marianelli	2005	Pride & Prejudice	Nominated	
Dario Marianelli	2007	Atonement	Won	
Dario Marianelli	2012	Anna Karenina	Nominated	
Ennio Morricone	2015	The Hateful Eight	Won	

== Best Music (Original Song) ==
This list focuses on songs by Italian-born composers and/or lyricists.

Name	Year	Film and Song	Result	Notes
Henry Mancini	1961	Breakfast at Tiffany's "Moon River"	Won	Shared with Johnny Mercer.
Henry Mancini	1962	Days of Wine and Roses "Days of Wine and Roses"	Won	Shared with Johnny Mercer.
Riz Ortolani; Nino Oliviero	1962	Mondo Cane "More"	Nominated	Shared with Norman Newell.
Riz Ortolani	1970	Madron "Till Love Touches Your Life"	Nominated	Shared with Arthur Hamilton.
Giorgio Moroder	1983	Flashdance "Flashdance... What a Feeling"	Won	Shared with Irene Cara and Keith Forsey.
Giorgio Moroder	1986	Top Gun "Take My Breath Away"	Won	Shared with Tom Whitlock.
Tony Renis; Alberto Testa	1998	Quest for Camelot "The Prayer"	Nominated	Shared with Carole Bayer Sager and David Foster.
Laura Pausini	2020	The Life Ahead "Io sì (Seen)"	Nominated	Shared with Diane Warren.

== Best Short Film – Animated ==
This list focuses on Italian-born directors.

Year	Name	Film	Status	Milestone / Notes
1932–33	Walter Lantz	The Merry Old Soul	Nominated	
1934	Walter Lantz	Jolly Little Elves	Nominated	
1941	Walter Lantz	Boogie Woogie Bugle Boy of Company B	Nominated	
1942	Walter Lantz	Juke Box Jamboree	Nominated	
1943	Walter Lantz	The Dizzy Acrobat	Nominated	
1944	Walter Lantz	Fish Fry	Nominated	
1945	Walter Lantz	The Poet and Peasant	Nominated	
1946	Walter Lantz	Musical Moments from Chopin	Nominated	
1954	Walter Lantz	Crazy Mixed Up Pup	Nominated	
1955	Walter Lantz	The Legend of Rockabye Point	Nominated	
1965	Emanuele Luzzati	La Gazza Ladra	Nominated	
1973	Emanuele Luzzati	Pulcinella	Nominated	
1976	Manfredo Manfredi	Dedalo	Nominated	
1990	Bruno Bozzetto	Cavallette	Nominated	
2011	Enrico Casarosa	La Luna	Nominated	

== Best Short Film – Live Action ==
This list focuses on Italian-born directors.

Year	Name	Film	Status
1953	Vincenzo Lucci-Chiarissi	Christ among the Primitives	Nominated
1986	Stefano Reali; Pino Quartullo	Exit	Nominated
1996	Bernadette Carranza; Antonello De Leo	Wordless (Senza parole)	Nominated
2007	Andrea Jublin	The Substitute (Il supplente)	Nominated
2023	Alice Rohrwacher	Le pupille	Nominated

== Best Visual Effects ==
Academy Award for Best Visual Effects
Year	Name	Film	Status	Milestone / Notes
1976	Carlo Rambaldi	King Kong	Honorary Award	Shared with Glen Robinson and Frank Van der Veer.
1979	Carlo Rambaldi	Alien	Won	Shared with H. R. Giger, Brian Johnson, Nick Allder and Dennis Ayling.
1982	Carlo Rambaldi	E.T. the Extra-Terrestrial	Won	Shared with Dennis Muren and Kenneth F. Smith.
2023	Simone Coco	Mission: Impossible – Dead Reckoning Part One	Nominated	Shared with Alex Wuttke, Jeff Sutherland and Neil Corbould
2023	Simone Coco	Napoleon	Nominated	Shared with Charley Henley, Luc-Ewen Martin-Fenouillet and Neil Corbould

== Best Writing – Adapted Screenplay ==
This list focuses on Italian-born screenplay writers.

Name	Year	Award	Film	Result
Sergio Amidei; Federico Fellini	1946	Best Screenplay	Rome, Open City (Roma, città aperta)	Nominated
Cesare Zavattini	1949	Best Screenplay	Bicycle Thieves (Ladri di biciclette)	Nominated
Bernardo Bertolucci	1971	Best Screenplay – Adapted	The Conformist (Il conformista)	Nominated
Vittorio Bonicelli; Ugo Pirro	1971	Best Screenplay – Adapted	The Garden of the Finzi-Continis (Il giardino dei Finzi-Contini)	Nominated
Ruggero Maccari; Dino Risi	1975	Best Screenplay – Adapted	Scent of a Woman (Profumo di donna)	Nominated
Federico Fellini; Bernardino Zapponi	1976	Best Screenplay – Adapted	Fellini's Casanova (Il Casanova di Federico Fellini)	Nominated
Bernardo Bertolucci	1987	Best Screenplay – Adapted	The Last Emperor	Won
Martin Scorsese	1990	Best Screenplay – Adapted	Goodfellas	Nominated
Martin Scorsese	1993	Best Screenplay – Adapted	The Age of Innocence)	Nominated
Anna Pavignano; Furio Scarpelli; Giacomo Scarpelli; Massimo Troisi	1995	Best Screenplay – Adapted	The Postman (Il postino)	Nominated

== Best Writing – Original Screenplay ==
This list focuses on Italian-born screenplay writers.

Name	Year	Award	Film	Result
Sergio Amidei; Adolfo Franci; Cesare Giulio Viola; Cesare Zavattini	1947	Best Screenplay	Shoeshine (Sciuscià)	Nominated
Sergio Amidei; Federico Fellini; Roberto Rossellini	1949	Best Screenplay	Paisà	Nominated
Federico Fellini; Tullio Pinelli	1956	Best Screenplay – Original	The Road (La strada)	Nominated
Federico Fellini; Ennio Flaiano; Tullio Pinelli	1957	Best Screenplay – Original	I Vitelloni	Nominated
Federico Fellini; Ennio Flaiano; Tullio Pinelli; Brunello Rondi	1961	Best Screenplay – Original	The Sweet Life (La dolce vita)	Nominated
Sergio Amidei; Diego Fabbri; Indro Montanelli	1961	Best Screenplay – Original	General Della Rovere (Il generale Della Rovere)	Nominated
Ennio De Concini; Alfredo Giannetti; Pietro Germi	1962	Best Screenplay – Original	Divorce, Italian Style (Divorzio all'italiana)	Won
Federico Fellini; Ennio Flaiano; Tullio Pinelli; Brunello Rondi	1963	Best Screenplay – Original	8½	Nominated
Pasquale Festa Campanile; Massimo Franciosa; Nanni Loy; Vasco Pratolini; Carlo Bernari	1963	Best Screenplay – Original	The Four Days of Naples (Le quattro giornate di Napoli)	Nominated
Agenore Incrocci; Furio Scarpelli; Mario Monicelli	1964	Best Screenplay – Original	The Organizer (I compagni)	Nominated
Agenore Incrocci; Furio Scarpelli; Mario Monicelli; Tonino Guerra; Giorgio Salvioni; Suso Cecchi D'Amico	1965	Best Screenplay – Original	Casanova 70	Nominated
Michelangelo Antonioni; Tonino Guerra (shared with Edward Bond)	1966	Best Story and Screenplay - Written Directly for the Screen	Blowup	Nominated
Gillo Pontecorvo; Franco Solinas	1968	Best Screenplay – Original	The Battle of Algiers (La battaglia di Algeri)	Nominated
Nicola Badalucco; Enrico Medioli; Luchino Visconti	1969	Best Screenplay – Original	The Damned (La caduta degli dei)	Nominated
Elio Petri; Ugo Pirro	1971	Best Screenplay – Original	(Indagine su un cittadino al di sopra di ogni sospetto)	Nominated
Federico Fellini; Tonino Guerra	1975	Best Screenplay – Original	I Remember (Amarcord)	Nominated
Lina Wertmüller	1976	Best Screenplay – Original	Seven Beauties (Pasqualino Settebellezze)	Nominated
Roberto Benigni; Vincenzo Cerami	1998	Best Screenplay – Original	Life Is Beautiful (La vita è bella)	Nominated
Alessandro Camon (shared with Oren Moverman)	2009	Best Screenplay – Original	The Messenger	Nominated

== Best Writing – Story ==
This list focuses on Italian-born screenplay writers

Name	Year	Award	Film	Result
Giuseppe De Santis; Carlo Lizzani	1949	Best Screenplay – Story	Bitter Rice	Nominated
Cesare Zavattini	1952	Best Screenplay – Story	Umberto D.	Nominated
Ettore Margadonna	1953	Best Screenplay – Story	Bread, Love and Dreams	Nominated

== Special awards ==
This list focuses on Italian-born honorees

Recipient	Year	Notes	Award
Sophia Loren	1990	"one of the genuine treasures of world cinema who, in a career rich with memorable performances, has added permanent luster to our art form."	Academy Honorary Award
Federico Fellini	1992	"in recognition of his cinematic accomplishments that have thrilled and entertained worldwide audiences."	Academy Honorary Award
Michelangelo Antonioni	1994	"in recognition of his place as one of the cinema's master visual stylists."	Academy Honorary Award
Dino De Laurentiis	2000		Irving G. Thalberg Memorial Award
Ennio Morricone	2006	"in recognition of his magnificent and multifaceted contributions to the art of film music."	Academy Honorary Award
Piero Tosi	2013	"a visionary whose incomparable costume designs shaped timeless, living art in motion pictures."	Academy Honorary Award
Lina Wertmüller	2019	"For her provocative disruption of political and social norms delivered with bravery through her weapon of choice: the camera lens."	Academy Honorary Award

== Nominations and Winners ==
No. of wins	No. of nominations	No. of shortlisted
78	295	4
