= David Bowes =

American painter (born 1957)

David Dirrane Bowes
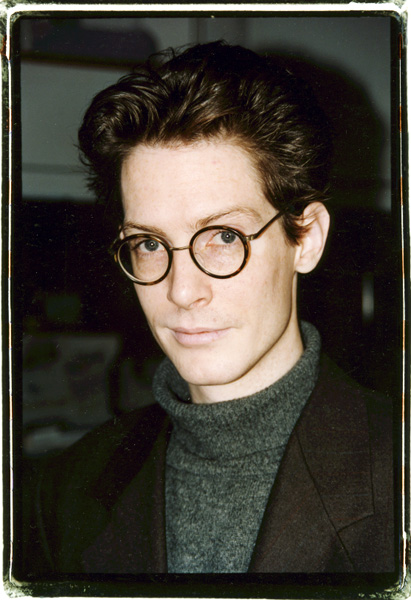
- Bowes in 1990
- Born: 1957 (age 68–69); Boston, Massachusetts, U.S.
- Education: Rhode Island School of Design
- Known for: Painting
- Movement: 1980s New York Art Scene

David Dirrane Bowes (born 1957) is an American painter, based in Turin, Italy. He was first recognized for his paintings during the early 1980s in the East Village of Manhattan.

== Biography ==
Born in 1957 to Katherine "Kae" (née Dirrane) and John S. Bowes. He is a brother of science fiction writer Richard Bowes. Bowes attended Rhode Island School of Design (RISD) in the mid 1970s and has taught painting classes at his alma mater.

His paintings are often brightly colored, with loose painterly strokes and make reference to multiple sources such as allegories, mythology and art history. He has been described as being a "brilliant painter", and having a "delicacy of touch and genuine fascination with the medium of paint."

Bowes' work is exhibited in the United States and Europe. He participated in 1999 at the 48th Venice Biennale and one of his works is present in the Lucio Amelio's Terrae Motus collection at the Royal Palace of Caserta starting in 1994. His work is held in various public museum collection, including the Walker Art Center, Portland Art Museum, the Broad Contemporary Art Museum at LACMA, among others.
