= Massimo Wertmüller =

Italian actor

- Born: 13 August 1956 (age 70); Rome, Italy
- Occupation: Actor
- Years active: 1978-present
- Height: 1.73 m (5 ft 8 in)
- Spouse: Anna Ferruzzo (m. 2018)
- Relatives: Lina Wertmüller (aunt)

Massimo Wertmüller (born 13 August 1956) is an Italian actor. He appeared in more than sixty films since 1978.

== Personal life ==
Wertmüller is the nephew of film director Lina Wertmüller. Additionally, he is married to Anna Ferruzzo and has no children. He is agnostic.

== Filmography ==
=== Films ===
Year	Title	Role	Notes
1978	A Night Full of Rain	Paolo's friend No. 2	Uncredited
1983	A Joke of Destiny	Beniamino	
1984	Softly Softly	Ginetto	
1985	Al limite, cioè, non glielo dico	Felice	
1986	Summer Night	Micky	
1989	Crystal or Ash, Fire or Wind, as Long as It's Love	Max	
1989	Le finte bionde	Giovanni	
1989	Night Club	Piero Grassi	
1990	Captain Fracassa's Journey	Leandro	
1990	In the Name of the Sovereign People	Eufemio Arquati	
1992	Allullo drom - L'anima zingara	Sergio	
1992	Cinecittà… Cinecittà	Luigi	
1993	The End Is Known	Carlo Piane	
1995	Heartless	Massimo Salvadori	
1995	Croce e delizia	Animanera	
1996	Esercizi di stile	Various characters	Anthology film
1996	Bits and Pieces	Massimo	
1996	Bruno aspetta in macchina	Father Carlo	
1997	Un bel di vedremo	Marco	
2001	Honolulu Baby	Margherita's co-worker	Cameo appearance
2002	Giovani	Renzo	
2002	Tornare indietro	Stefano Faenza	
2003	Pontormo - Un amore eretico	Bronzino	
2006	Commediasexi	Mr. Nappi	
2010	Barney's Version	Doctor	Cameo appearance
2013	AnnA	Lover	Short film
2013	The Fifth Wheel	Ernesto's father	
2016	What's the Big Deal	Manilo	
2016	Ears	Doctor	Cameo appearance
2019	Appena un minuto	Mario	
2021	America Latina	Massimo's father	
2023	The Worst Days	Dr. Vullo	

=== Television ===
Year	Title	Role	Notes
1987	I padroni dell’estate	Manlio Azara	Television film
1991	Il sassofono	Alessandro	Television film
1992	Le fils d'un autre	Ralph	Television film
1993	Il caso Dozier	Roberto	Television film
1997	L'avvocato delle donne	Alberto Nobili	Episode: "Laura"
1997	Mio padre è innocente	Lamberto Melandri	Television film
1997	Tutti gli uomini sono uguali	Giacomo Sacchetti	Co-lead role; 7 episodes
1998	Lui e lei	Massimo	Main role (season 1); 8 episodes
1998	La quindicesima epistola	Attilio Scarpa	Television film
2001	Senza confini	The Commissioner	Miniseries
2002	Francesca e Nunziata	Angelo Limieri	Television film
2005–2007	La squadra	Commisary Giorgio Pettenella	Main role (seasons 7–8), recurring role (season 6); 48 episodes
2008	Crociera Vianello	Commander Giansanti	Television film
2009	Tutta la verità	Umberto Salviati	Miniseries
2009	Pane e libertà	Palmiro Togliatti	Miniseries
2010	Crimini	Marzio Natoli	Episode: "Little Dream"
2011	Atelier Fontana - Le sorelle della moda	Mazzocchi	Miniseries
2012	La vita che corre	Bruno	Miniseries
2013	Che Dio ci aiuti	Giorgio Alfieri	Recurring role (season 2); 9 episodes
2014	La Bella e la Bestia	Maurice DuBois	Miniseries
2014	I segreti di Borgo Larici	Father Costante	Main role; 6 episodes
2015	Squadra antimafia - Palermo oggi	Goffredo Collina	Recurring role (season 2); 6 episodes
2015	Fuoriclasse	Aurelio Marciali	Recurring role; 4 episodes
2015	1992	Mario Segni	Episode: "Episode Four"
2015–2018	È arrivata la felicità	Guido Mieli	Main role; 48 episodes
2016	Non dirlo al mio capo	Emiliano Cestrilli	Recurring role (season 1)
2016	In arte Nino	Cinecittà director	Television film
2019, 2022	Meraviglie - La penisola dei tesori	Himself/ Guest	2 episodes
2020	Permette? Alberto Sordi	Steno	Television film
2021	Mina Settembre	General	Main role
2021	Noi	Dr. Castaldi	Recurring role; 3 episodes
