= Swept Away (1974 film) =

1974 film by Lina Wertmüller

- Theatrical release poster
- Italian: Travolti da un insolito destino nell'azzurro mare d'agosto
- Directed by: Lina Wertmüller
- Written by: Lina Wertmüller
- Produced by: Romano Cardarelli
- Starring: Giancarlo Giannini; Mariangela Melato; Riccardo Salvino; Isa Danieli; Aldo Puglisi; Eros Pagni
- Cinematography: Ennio Guarnieri
- Edited by: Franco Fraticelli
- Music by: Piero Piccioni
- Distributed by: Medusa Distribuzione
- Release date: 19 December 1974
- Running time: 114 minutes
- Country: Italy
- Language: Italian
- Box office: $6 million (US and Canada rentals) or $1,750,000

Swept Away by an Unusual Destiny in the Blue Sea of August (Italian: Travolti da un insolito destino nell'azzurro mare d'agosto), commonly shortened to Swept Away, is a 1974 Italian romantic adventure comedy-drama film written and directed by Lina Wertmüller, starring Giancarlo Giannini and Mariangela Melato. The film follows a wealthy woman whose yachting vacation with friends in the Mediterranean Sea takes an unexpected turn when she and one of the boat's crew are separated from the others and stranded on a desert island. The woman's capitalist beliefs and the man's communist convictions clash, but during their struggle to survive, their social roles are reversed.

Swept Away was released to divided, but largely positive, reviews, and won the 1975 National Board of Review of Motion Pictures Award for Top Foreign Film. A critically and commercially unsuccessful English-language remake starring Madonna and directed by her then-husband Guy Ritchie was released in 2002.

== Plot summary ==
An arrogant wealthy woman named Raffaella Pavone Lanzetti is vacationing on a yacht in the Mediterranean Sea with friends—swimming, sunbathing, and talking incessantly about the "virtues" of her class and the worthlessness of the political left. Her nonstop political monologue infuriates one of the deckhands, Gennarino, a dedicated communist who manages to restrain his opinions to avoid losing his good job. Despite her humiliating insults, Gennarino agrees to take her out on a dinghy late in the evening to see the rest of her friends who have gone ahead without her. On their way, the outboard motor gives out, leaving them stranded in the middle of the sea with no land in sight.

After a night at sea, Gennarino manages to get the motor running again, but has no idea where they are. Eventually, they spot an island and head towards it, destroying their dinghy in the process. On land, they discover that there is no one else on the island. Accustomed to having everything done for her, Raffaella begins ordering Gennarino about, but he snaps, refusing to assist her any longer. Raffaella reacts with a string of insults, but he gives as good as he gets, and they split up to explore the island on their own.

Gennarino is soon catching and cooking lobsters. Gradually, their roles become reversed. While she has to rely on him for food, Gennarino wants her to be his slave, convinced that women are born to serve men. He even forces her to endure the indignity of washing his underwear. When she reacts in angry defiance, he slaps her around. Gennarino starts to rape her, but then changes his mind, deciding that it would be more satisfying if she gave herself to him willingly. Later that evening, Raffaella does approach him, and both willingly engage in passionate sex. He wants her to fall in love with him, and she becomes subservient to him. Eventually, they spot a ship, and although they are both reluctant to disrupt their newfound paradise, they signal the ship and are rescued.

After returning home, Gennarino and Raffaella soon revert to their former lives and social roles—she once again embracing the upper-class lifestyle of her friends; he returning to a life of a lower-class worker and husband. Gennarino secretly contacts Raffaella and asks her to return to the island with him where they can live, promising to abandon his wife and children for her should she also leave her husband. Raffaella instead chooses to leave with her husband by helicopter, leaving Gennarino to scream insults at the vehicle as he is left alone on the dock. Gennarino's wife Anna discovers his affair, and spitefully tells him their marriage is over. A defeated and saddened Gennarino carries his wife's luggage along the dock, trailing behind her.

== Cast ==
- Giancarlo Giannini as Gennarino Carunchio
- Mariangela Melato as Raffaella Pavone Lanzetti
- Riccardo Salvino as Signor Pavone Lanzetti
- Isa Danieli as Anna Carunchio
- Aldo Puglisi as Aldo
- Eros Pagni as Pippo

== Production ==
The film was shot along the eastern Sardinian coast, in the province of Nuoro; the sailing yacht that can be seen at the beginning of the film is the J-class yacht Shamrock V, which at the time of production was named Quadrifoglio. The beach of the landing of the two shipwrecks is Cala Fuili, in the municipality of Dorgali. The beach of Cala Luna, on horseback between the municipality of Dorgali and Baunei, was another location used for filming. The Carunchio refuge and the most sensual scenes were shot in the dunes of Capo Comino, a town in the municipality of Siniscola.

Although in the film, it seems that the shipwrecks travel a single beach, in reality these beaches are several kilometers apart. The final scene of the helicopter departure is set in Tortolì, in Ogliastra, also in the province of Nuoro. The same locations were also chosen for Guy Ritchie's remake of the film.

== Release ==
Swept Away was released in Italy on 19 December 1974 by Medusa Distribuzione.

== Reception ==
=== Box office ===
Swept Away was the fifth highest-grossing film released in Italy during the 1974–1975 season.

=== Critical response ===
In his review in the Chicago Sun-Times, American film critic Roger Ebert gave the film four out of four stars. Ebert wrote that the film "resists the director's most determined attempts to make it a fable about the bourgeoisie and the proletariat, and persists in being about a man and a woman. On that level, it's a great success."

Other reviewers and analysts responded that those who focused on the misogyny did not understand the film's message about class warfare. James Berardinelli defended the film, writing, "Those who view this film casually may easily mistake it for a male fantasy... The reality, however, is that Wertmuller is exhibiting the courage to show things that other filmmakers shy away from." John P. Lovell wrote, "The sexual violence can be analyzed as political violence within the framework of patriarchal politics and the film's concern with a symbolic presentation of social revolt."

In her review in Jump Cut, Tania Modleski dismissed those justifications, contending that critics would not have been so kind to those who made films which reinforced stereotypes—culminating in violent subjugation—about oppressed ethnic groups, so there was no justification for critics to praise a rape-fantasy film. Responding to the film's message about class warfare, she wrote "So even if Wertmuller wanted to convey only a political message, she has clouded rather than clarified the issues. She should have made both parties male."

On the review aggregator website Rotten Tomatoes, 62% of 26 critics' reviews are positive, with an average rating of 7.6/10. Metacritic, which uses a weighted average, assigned the film a score of 68 out of 100, based on 7 critics, indicating "generally favorable" reviews.

=== Accolades ===
Award	Year	Category	Recipient	Result
David di Donatello	1975	Best Score	Piero Piccioni	Won
National Board of Review Awards	1975	Top Five Foreign Films	Swept Away	Won
New York Film Critics Circle Awards	1975	Best Film	Swept Away	Nominated
New York Film Critics Circle Awards	1975	Best Director	Lina Wertmüller	Nominated
New York Film Critics Circle Awards	1975	Best Screenplay	Lina Wertmüller	Nominated
Tehran International Film Festival	1975	Best Film	Lina Wertmüller	Won
Tehran International Film Festival	1975	Best Actress	Mariangela Melato	Won

== Remake ==
The film was remade in 2002 as Swept Away, starring Madonna and directed by her then-husband Guy Ritchie. The film was a critical and commercial failure. The male lead was played by Adriano Giannini, the son of Giancarlo Giannini.

== See also ==
- The Admirable Crichton
- Overboard
- Liza
