= Lina Wertmüller =

Italian director and screenwriter (1928–2021)

Lina Wertmüller OMRI
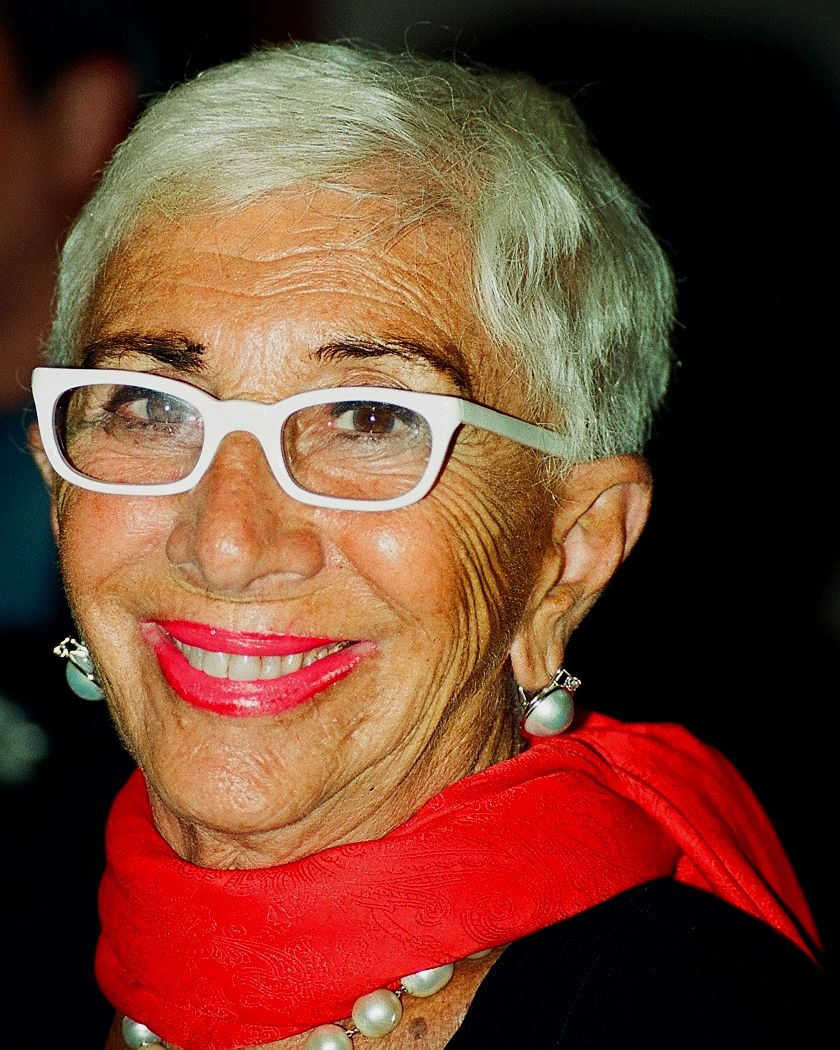
- Wertmüller in 2000
- Born: Arcangela Felice Assunta Wertmüller; 14 August 1928; Rome, Kingdom of Italy
- Died: 9 December 2021 (aged 93); Rome, Italy
- Occupations: Film director; screenwriter
- Years active: 1963–2021
- Spouse: Enrico Job (m. 1965; died 2008)
- Children: 1
- Relatives: Massimo Wertmüller (nephew)

Arcangela Felice Assunta "Lina" Wertmüller (Italian: [ˈliːna vertˈmyller]; 14 August 1928 – 9 December 2021) was an Italian film director and screenwriter. She is best known for her 1970s art house films Seven Beauties, The Seduction of Mimi, Love and Anarchy, and Swept Away.

Wertmüller was the first female director to be nominated for the Academy Award for Best Director. She won many awards, including an Academy Honorary Award, as well as a David di Donatello Career Achievement Award, and was nominated for many others, including a Golden Globe Award, two Academy Awards, and two Palme d'Or awards.

== Early life ==
Wertmüller was born Arcangela Felice Assunta Wertmüller in Rome, Lazio, in 1928, to Federico, a lawyer from Palazzo San Gervasio, Basilicata, belonging to a devoutly Catholic family of distant Swiss descent, and to Maria Santamaria-Maurizio from Rome. Wertmüller depicted her childhood as a period of adventure, during which she was expelled from 15 different Catholic high schools. During this time, she was infatuated with comic books, and described them as especially influential on her in her youth, particularly Alex Raymond's character Flash Gordon. Wertmüller characterized the framing of Raymond's comics as "rather cinematic, more cinematic than most films", an early indication of her inclination toward film. Wertmüller's desire to work in the film and theater industries took hold at a young age, as early on in life she developed an appreciation for the works of the Russian playwrights Pietro Sharoff, Vladimir Nemirovich-Danchenko, and Konstantin Stanislavsky, drawing her into the world of performing arts.

After graduating from Accademia Nazionale di Arte Drammatica Silvio D'Amico in 1951, Wertmüller produced avant-garde plays, traveling throughout Europe and working as a puppeteer, stage manager, set designer, publicist, and scriptwriter for radio and television. She joined Maria Signorelli's troupe in 1951. These interests developed toward two general avenues; one being the musical comedy and the other being grave, contemporary Italian dramas like the works of Italian playwright and director Giorgio De Lullo, whose work she described as "serious" and "politically conscious". It is these two approaches that Wertmüller stated were at the core of her creative self, and always would be.

== Film career ==
=== 1960s ===
After her years spent touring with an avant-garde puppet group, Wertmüller began to pursue a career in film. In the early 1960s, Flora Carabella, a school friend, introduced Wertmüller to her husband, the actor Marcello Mastroianni, who in turn introduced her to the film director Federico Fellini, who became her mentor.

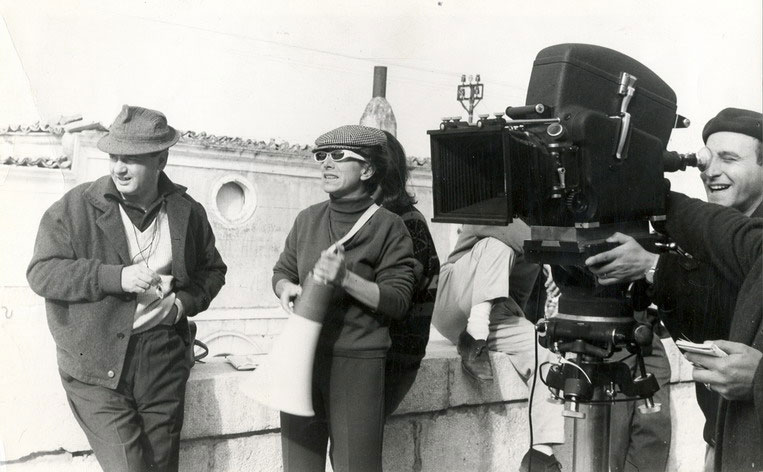
Wertmuller during the filming of The Lizards (1963)

Although The Lizards, which was scored by Ennio Morricone, was critically well received, it did not garner the level of attention her later works did. Throughout the 1960s, Wertmüller produced a series of films that were well liked but that failed to garner international success. Of these, her first collaboration with Giancarlo Giannini occurred in 1966's musical comedy Rita the Mosquito. Darragh O'Donoghue wrote in Cineaste that generally "her early films comprise a fairly straight pastiche of neorealism and early Fellini (The Lizards, 1963), an episodic comedy, two musicals, and a Spaghetti Western (The Belle Starr Story, 1968, directed under the pseudonym Nathan Wich), works where knowledge of generic predecessors was essential".

=== 1970s ===
The 1970s saw the release of virtually all of Wertmüller's most influential and highly regarded films, many of which featured Giannini. According to Geoffrey Nowell-Smith's Companion to Italian Cinema, 1972 "marked the beginning of Wertmüller's golden age". Beginning in 1972 with The Seduction of Mimi, and continuing until 1978 with Blood Feud, Wertmüller released seven films, many of which are considered masterpieces of Commedia all'italiana. It was during this time she saw critical and international success, gaining traction as a filmmaker outside of Italy and in the United States on a scale that many of her contemporaries were unable to attain.

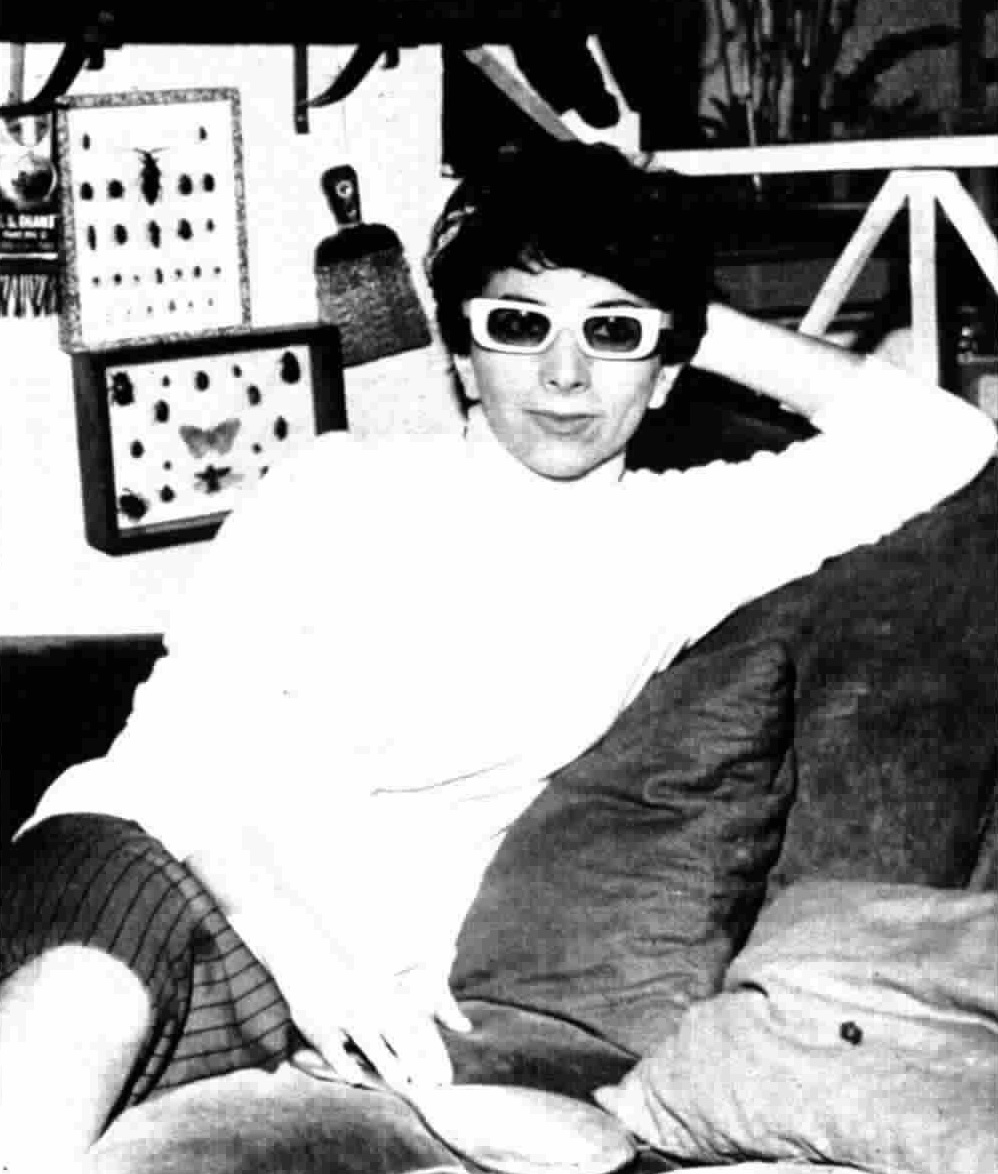
Wertmüller in 1972, from the magazine Radiocorriere TV

In 1975, the National Board of Review in the United States awarded Swept Away Top Foreign Film, and in 1976, Wertmüller became the first female director to be nominated for an Oscar, for Seven Beauties. This film, which again features Giannini in the lead role, pushes Wertmüller's specific brand of tragic comedy to its limits, following a self-obsessed Casanova from a small Italian town who is sent to a German concentration camp. The film initially met with controversy due to Wertmüller's frankness in her rendering of the apparatuses of genocide as well as her perceived macabre insensitivity toward its survivors, but since has been accepted as her masterwork.

Wertmüller then signed a contract with Warner Bros. to make four films. The first was her first English-language film, A Night Full of Rain, which was entered into the 28th Berlin International Film Festival in 1978. The film was not a success and Warner canceled the contract. Wertmüller also had creative differences with the studio and wanted more creative freedom. In the same year, Wertmüller had another unsuccessful film, Blood Feud, a mafia thriller starring Giannini, Marcello Mastroianni and Sophia Loren.

=== 1980s & '90s ===
Wertmüller's 1983 film A Joke of Destiny was entered into the 14th Moscow International Film Festival in 1985 and Camorra (A Story of Streets, Women and Crime) was entered into the 36th Berlin International Film Festival in 1986. In 1985, she received the Women in Film Crystal Award for outstanding women who have helped to expand the role of women within the entertainment industry.

After this period of acclaim, Wertmüller began to fade from international prominence, though she continued to release films well into the 1980s and '90s. Some of these films were sponsored by American financiers and studios, but failed to have the breadth of reach that her 1970s films achieved. These films are less widely seen and were neglected or disparaged by most, but Summer Night (1986) and Ferdinando & Carolina (1999) have since improved in reputation. Ciao, Professore (1992) is one of her few films of this period that was relatively well-received as the number 10 film in Italy that year.

== Later life ==
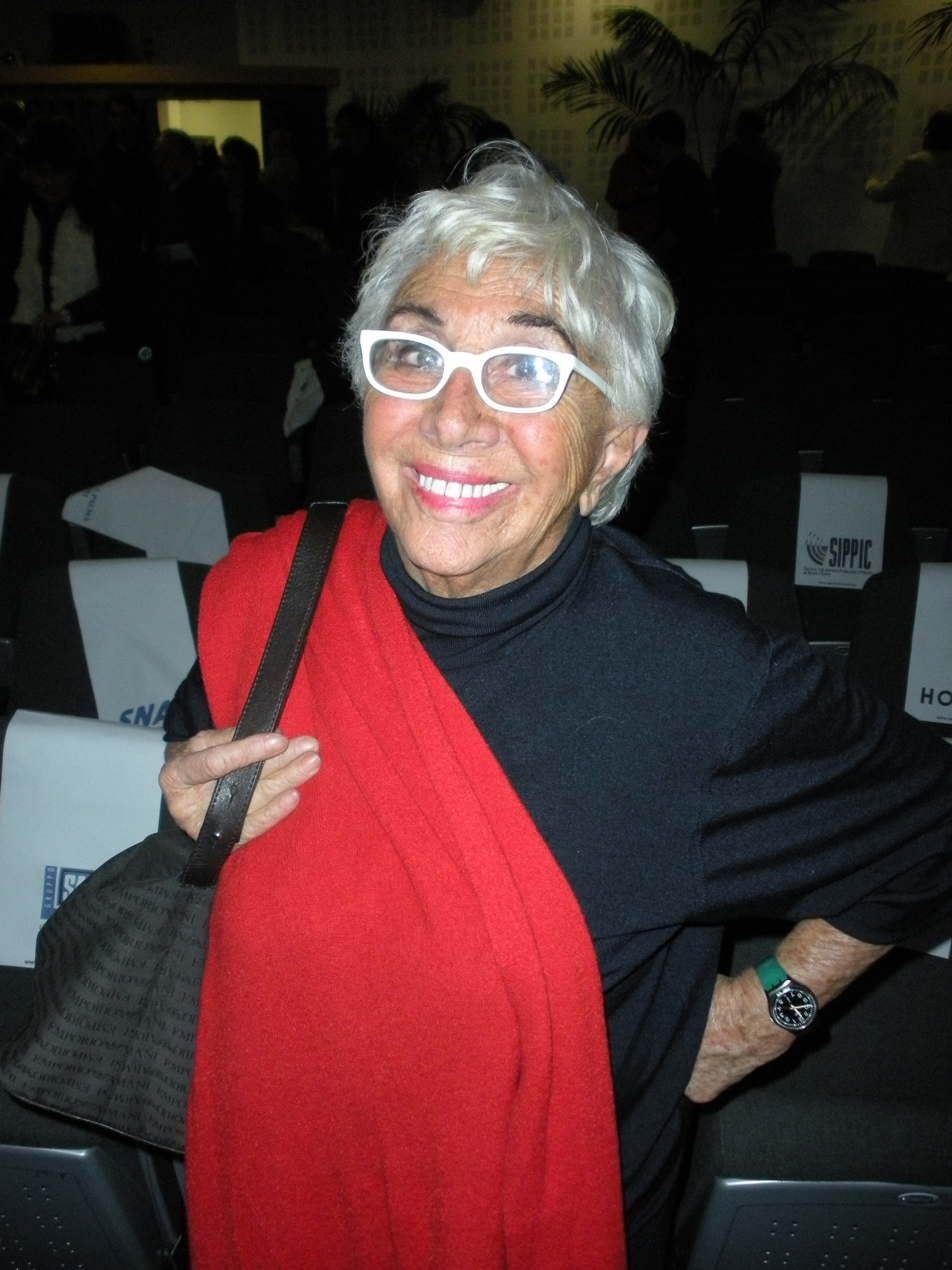
Wertmüller in 2011

Wertmüller was married to Enrico Job (died 4 March 2008), an art designer who worked on several of her pictures. They are survived by their daughter Maria Zulima (born 17 January 1991), who was an actress in a few of Wertmüller's films, including The Blue Collar Worker and the Hairdresser in a Whirl of Sex and Politics (1996), Ferdinando and Carolina (1999), Too Much Romance... It's Time for Stuffed Peppers (2004) and Mannaggia alla Miseria! (2009).

In 2015, Wertmüller was the subject of a biographical film directed by Valerio Ruiz, Behind the White Glasses, in which she reflects on her life's work. Wertmüller continued to work as a theater director, until her death at her home on 9 December 2021, at the age of 93.

== Style and themes ==
Fellini's influence is evident in much of Wertmüller's work. They share empathy with the Italian working class, showing the realities of life for the politically neglected and economically downtrodden, with a tendency toward the preposterous. Wertmüller's work also seems to exhibit adoration of Italy and its varied locales, beautifying elements of her film's locations with cinematography that presents its subjects with a colorful extravagance that idealizes the distinctly Italian settings of her films. Her aesthetic borrows heavily from her background in theater, routinely using the camera to emphasize performance and the grandiose comedy of her characters’ near constant emotional frenzy. Much of her work uses formal film tactics to dramatize the misapplication and destructive qualities that political ideology can have on individuals, satirizing common conceptions of revolution and the political status quo in the process.

Narrative and cinematic reflexivity are also commonplace in Wertmüller's films, as she rehashed and reconfigured signs and modes of presentation in a way that references her inspirations and her contemporaries. This is made clear through her disruption of traditional conceptions of virtually all political dogma and the irrationality of her characters, taking recognizable elements of society and film and critiquing them by doing away with narrative and/or character plausibility.

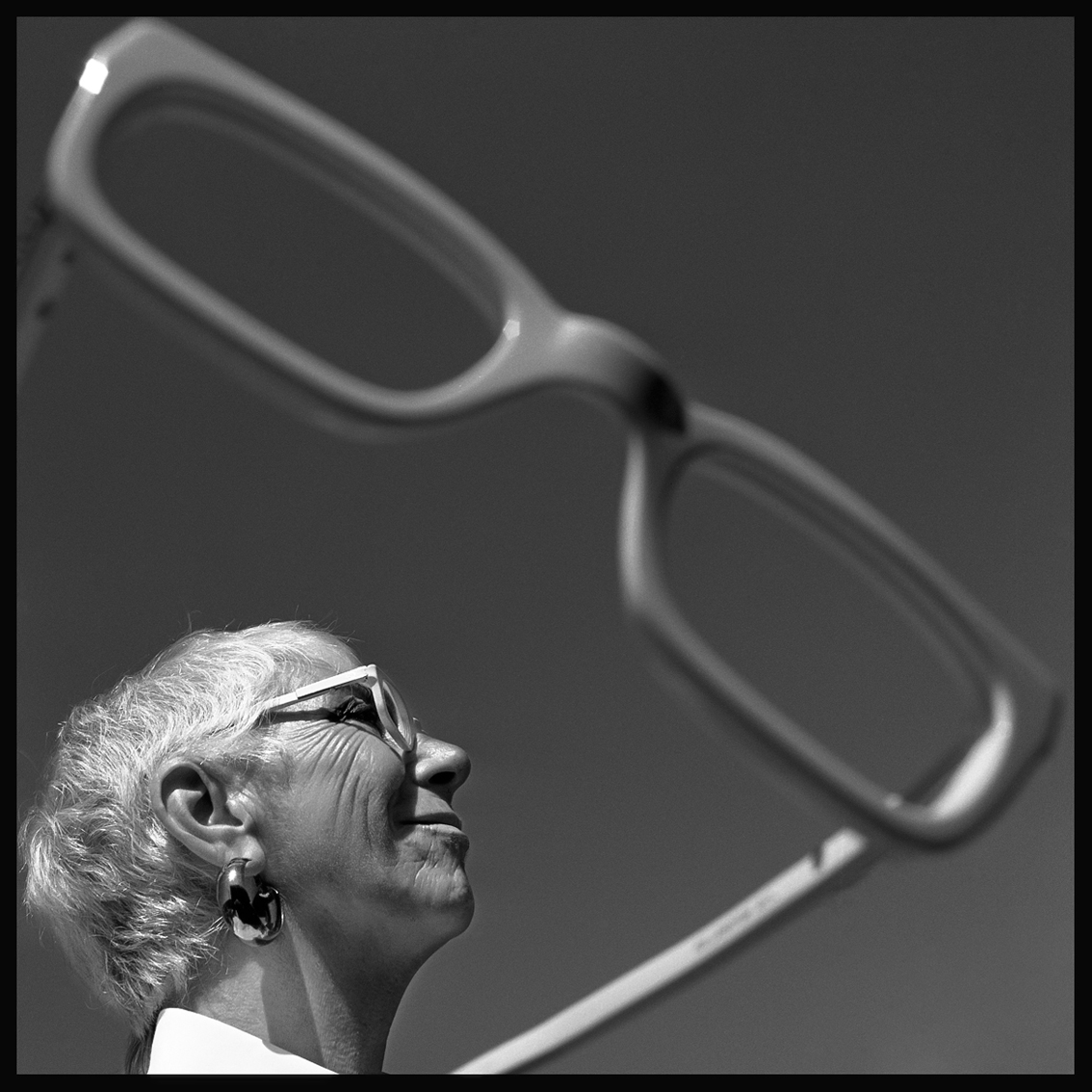
Lina Wertmuller in 1987, photographed by Augusto De Luca

This is particularly evident in a film like The Seduction of Mimi. This positions Mimi (played by Giannini) as an impossibly inept and simple man who fully embodies the notion of Italian machismo, as he fumbles his way through a world that throws a variety of ideologies and economic positions at him, all of which he readily inhabits. Mimi is perpetually successful in his performance of these roles, despite the audience's awareness of their inauthenticity that results from a diegetic acknowledgement of Mimi's hapless ignorance. This element of critique in the film functions as one example of one of the most prevalent themes in Wertmüller's work, a desire to deconstruct and subvert the institutions and social ideologies of a capitalist modernity. This socialist-inflected politicization of class and the institution are also extended to sexuality and gender. Most of her films deploy these elements in conjunction with her affection for the theatrical in such a way that creates a unique concoction that is undeniably within the generic confines of Commedia all’italiana. According to Peter Bondanella, "Wertmüller's work combined a concern with topical political issues and the conventions of traditional Italian grotesque comedy".

Wertmüller is known for her whimsically prolix movie titles. For instance, the full title of Swept Away is Swept away by an unusual destiny in the blue sea of August. These titles were invariably shortened for international release. She is entered in the Guinness Book of Records for the longest film title. The previously mentioned Blood Feud has the full name of Un fatto di sangue nel comune di Siculiana fra due uomini per causa di una vedova. Si sospettano moventi politici. Amore-Morte-Shimmy. Lugano belle. Tarantelle. Tarallucci e vino, which totals 179 characters.

== Filmography ==
Year	Title	Role	Notes
1963	The Lizards	Writer, Director	
1965	Let's Talk About Men	Writer, Director	
1966	Rita the Mosquito	Writer, Director	
1967	Don't Sting the Mosquito	Writer, Director	
1968	The Belle Starr Story	Writer, Director	
1972	The Seduction of Mimi	Writer, Director	
1973	Love and Anarchy	Writer, Director	
1974	All Screwed Up	Writer, Director	
1974	Swept Away by an Unusual Destiny in the Blue Sea of August	Writer, Director	
1975	Seven Beauties	Writer, Director	
1978	Blood Feud	Writer, Director	
1978	The End of the World in Our Usual Bed in a Night Full of Rain	Writer, Director	
1983	A Joke of Destiny, Lying in Wait Around the Corner Like a Bandit	Writer, Director	
1984	Softly, Softly	Writer, Director	
1986	Summer Night, with Greek Profile, Almond Eyes and Scent of Basil	Writer, Director	
1986	Camorra (A Story of Streets, Women and Crime)	Writer, Director	
1989	The Tenth One in Hiding	Writer, Director	
1989	As Long as It's Love	Writer, Director	
1990	Saturday, Sunday and Monday	Writer, Director	
1992	Ciao, Professore!	Writer, Director	
1996	The Blue Collar Worker and the Hairdresser in a Whirl of Sex and Politics	Writer, Director	
1996	The Nymph	Writer, Director	
1999	Ferdinando and Carolina	Writer, Director	
2004	Too Much Romance... It's Time for Stuffed Peppers	Writer, Director	

== Awards and nominations ==
Year	Award	Category	Title	Result	Notes
2019	Academy Awards	Academy Honorary Award		Won	
2017	Boston Society of Film Critics Awards	Best Rediscoveries	Seven Beauties	Won	
2010	David di Donatello Awards	Career Achievement Award		Won	
2009	Golden Globes Italy	Career Achievement Award		Won	
2008	Flaiano International Prizes	Career Achievement Award		Won	
1986	Berlin International Film Festival	Otto Dibelius Film Award	Camorra (A Story of Streets, Women and Crime)	Won	
1985	Crystal Awards			Won	
1977	Golden Globe Awards	Golden Globe Award for Best Foreign Language Film	Seven Beauties	Nominated	
1977	Directors Guild of America Awards	Outstanding Directorial Achievement in Motion Pictures	Seven Beauties	Nominated	
1977	Academy Awards	Best Original Screenplay	Seven Beauties	Nominated	
1977	Academy Awards	Best Director	Seven Beauties	Nominated	
1975	Tehran International Film Festival	Golden Ibex	Swept Away	Won	
1975	National Board of Review	Top Foreign Film	Swept Away	Won	
1973	Cannes Film Festival	Palme d'Or	Love and Anarchy	Nominated	
1972	Cannes Film Festival	Palme d'Or	The Seduction of Mimi	Nominated	
1964	Golden Goblets Italy	Plate	The Lizards	Won	
1963	Locarno International Film Festival	Silver Sail for Direction	The Lizards	Won	

== See also ==
- List of Italian Academy Award winners and nominees

== Sources ==
- Biskind, Peter (December 1974). "Lina Wertmuller: The Politics of Private Life". Film Quarterly. 28 (2): 10–16. doi:10.2307/1211628. JSTOR 1211628.
- Bullaro, Grace Russo. Man in Disorder - The Cinema of Lina Wertmüller in the 1970s ISBN 978-1-905886-39-5
- Déléas, Josette. Lina Wertmüller - Un rire noir chaussé de lunettes blanches - a critical biography filled with anecdotes and Lina's humor ISBN 978-1-4251-2755-8
- William R. Magretta and Joan Magretta. "Lina Wertmuller and the Tradition of Italian Carnivalesque Comedy" in Genre 12, pp. 25–43. (1979)
- Tiziana Masucci. I chiari di Lina (Edizioni Sabinae, Roma 2009)ISBN 978-88-96105-22-1
- O'Donoghue, Darragh (2018). "Laughter in the Dark: The Black Comedy of Lina Wertmüller". Cineaste. 43 (4): 15–21, 78. ProQuest 2093229170.
- Jacobs, Diane; Riley, Brooks (1976). "Lina Wertmüller". Film Comment. 12 (2): 48–51, 64. ProQuest 210265585.
- Behind The White Glasses, Dir. Valerio Ruiz, Italy, 2015.
- Bondanella, Peter (1990). Italian Cinema : From Neorealism to the Present. Continuum. ISBN 0-8264-0426-X. OCLC 20911414.
