= Augusto De Luca =

Italian photographer (born 1955)

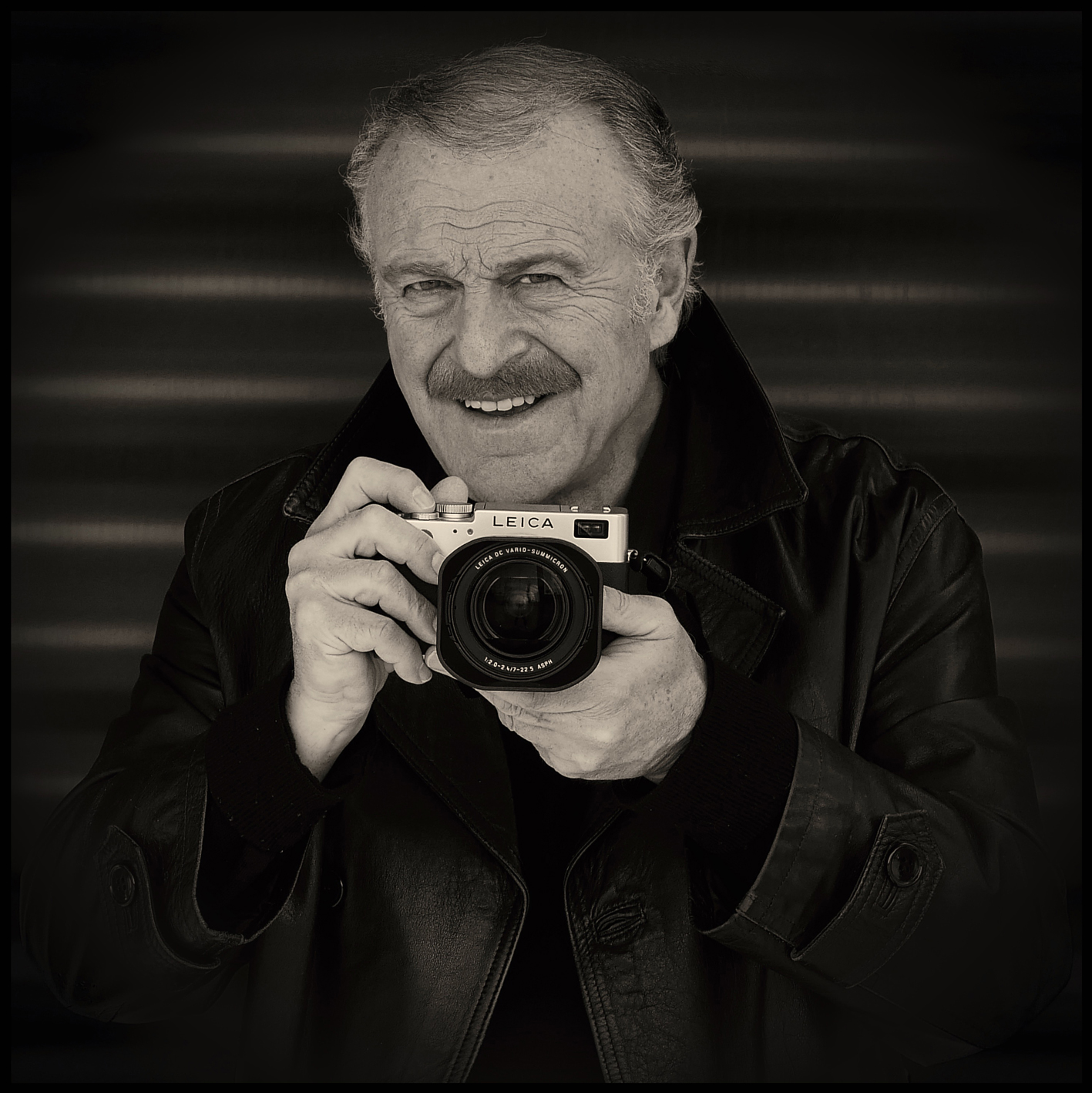
- Augusto De Luca in 2021
- Born: 1 July 1955 (age 71); Naples, Italy
- Known for: Photography
- Awards: Città di Roma prize, 1996

Augusto De Luca (Naples, 1 July 1955) is an Italian photographer specialized in portraits.

His first solo show was at Centro Teatro Spazio Libero, a theater founded in 1972 by puppeteer Renato Barbieri at Parco Margherita in Naples.

In 1996, he was awarded the "città di Roma" prize for the photographs in the book Roma Nostra. In 1997, the photos from this book were exhibited at the "il Diaframma" gallery in Milan.
