= Isa Danieli =

Italian actress (born 1937)

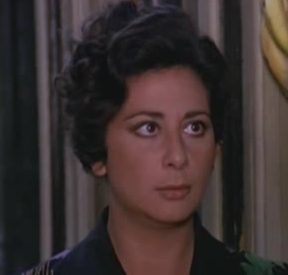
- Isa Danieli in the movie Il lumacone (1974)
- Born: 13 March 1937 (age 89); Naples, Kingdom of Italy
- Occupation: Actress
- Years active: 1962–present

Isa Danieli (born 13 March 1937) is an Italian film actress. She has appeared in 32 films since 1962.

== Early life ==
Danieli's mother Rosa Moretti (stage name of Maria Santoro, widow of Amatucci, 1904-1959) was one of the voices of Radio Napoli with Tito Petralia's orchestra from 1928. Her paternal grandparents were a great dynasty of actors: the Di Napoli. Her father, Renato Di Napoli, was her mother's partner for a certain period of time, before separating definitively without ever having married. Born and raised in the theaters of the Neapolitan sceneggiata, where her mother and uncles Di Napoli worked, she made her debut at 14 with the stage name of Luisa Moretti, in 'O curniciello in the role of seduced and abandoned.

== Career ==
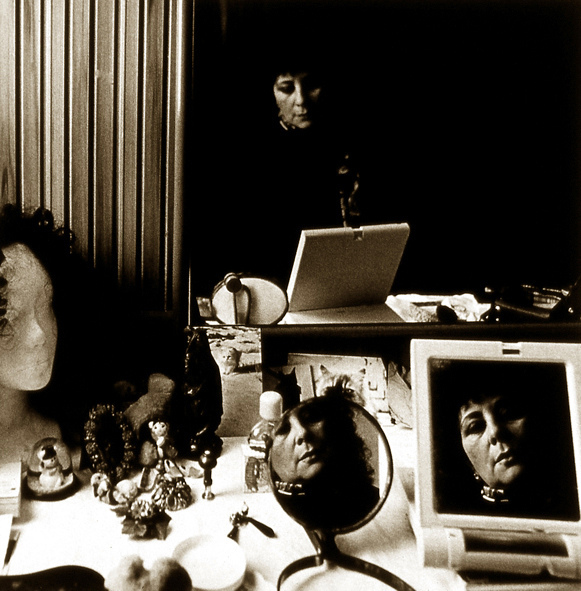
Isa Danieli in 1987, photographed by Augusto De Luca

While she was acting in the Neapolitan sceneggiata she met Eduardo De Filippo, as she herself explains: "I learned about this great figure, this man who had remade the Teatro San Ferdinando. (…) I wrote a letter to Eduardo saying that I would have really liked to work in their company and that I was a young actress. Eduardo probably wouldn’t have even thought of me, if it hadn’t happened instead, after a couple of weeks or even three, a girl died of an urgent appendicitis. In short, they were making Napoli milionaria! and he needed one of these girls who played the part of his daughter’s friends, the one who talked about her friends the most. (…) He received this letter and the photograph (…) and the poster of the sceneggiata. (…) He called me, I went and I debuted the same evening of the show.", still with the stage name of Luisa Moretti.

After the reruns of Napoli milionaria!, in the role of Teresa, Eduardo confirmed her as an extra in Questi fantasma! and wrote the parts of the waitress for her in Mia famiglia, and Bene mio e core mio. In 1955, during the tour in Rome, she changed her stage name, definitively, to Isa Danieli. Her first time on television was again with Eduardo's company, in the role of Gemma in Miseria e nobiltà, broadcast live on 30 December 1955 from the Odeon Theatre in Milan. In 1956, after Il dono di Natale and Quei figureri di tanti anni fa, dissatisfied with the small roles that Eduardo assigned her, she decided to leave the De Filippo company for the variety show, understanding that to be a complete actress she had to learn to dance and sing. She thus had the opportunity to act with Trottolino (stage name of Umberto D'Ambrosio) and Rino Marcelli.

== Selected filmography ==
- Love and Anarchy (1973)
- The Peaceful Age (1974)
- Swept Away (1974)
- Il marsigliese (1975) by Giacomo Battiato
- Caro Michele (1976)
- Blood Feud (1978)
- Così parlò Bellavista (1984)
- Macaroni (1985)
- Camorra (A Story of Streets, Women and Crime) (1986)
- Cinema Paradiso (1988)
- Journey of Hope (1990)
