= 2022 in film =

2022 in film is an overview of events, including the highest-grossing films, award ceremonies, critics' lists of the best films of 2022, festivals, a list of country-specific lists of films released, and movie programming. Universal Pictures and Paramount Pictures celebrated their 110th anniversary, Motion Picture Association celebrated their 100th anniversary, Aardman celebrated its 50th anniversary and Illumination celebrated its 15th anniversary.

== Evaluation of the year ==
In his article highlighting the best movies of 2022, Richard Brody of The New Yorker said, "This year, it's all the more important to offer a widely inclusive list, because a wide range of American filmmakers have caught up with the inescapable phenomenon of the recent past: the resurgence of openly anti-democratic forces and brazenly hate-driven ideologies, the crisis of illegitimate rule, the menace of authoritarianism, the potential end of even our current debilitated American democracy. The phenomenon is certainly not limited to the United States, and filmmakers from around the world have long been confronting it in their own countries bravely, insightfully, and ingeniously. For years, many of the best American filmmakers have been making films of political outrage, with the unsurprising likes of Spike Lee, Jim Jarmusch, and Frederick Wiseman at the forefront, and such younger filmmakers as Jordan Peele, Garrett Bradley, and Eliza Hittman joining them. This year offers a shift in the cinematic paradigm by way of a host of memorable movies; there's something new and extraordinary in the air, and it has precisely to do with history and memory—and, most powerfully, their intersection."

== Highest-grossing films ==
Highest-grossing films of 2022
Rank	Title	Distributor	Worldwide gross
1	Avatar: The Way of Water	20th Century	$2,320,250,281 (Note: Excluding grosses from subsequent re-releases.)
2	Top Gun: Maverick	Paramount	$1,495,696,292
3	Jurassic World Dominion	Universal	$1,001,978,080
4	Doctor Strange in the Multiverse of Madness	Disney	$955,775,804
5	Minions: The Rise of Gru	Universal	$940,628,210
6	Black Panther: Wakanda Forever	Disney	$859,208,836
7	The Batman	Warner Bros.	$772,245,583
8	Thor: Love and Thunder	Disney	$760,928,081
9	The Battle at Lake Changjin II	Bona	$626,571,697
10	Puss in Boots: The Last Wish	Universal	$485,261,639

=== 2022 box office records ===
- The Jurassic Park franchise became the tenth film franchise to gross $6 billion with the release of Jurassic World Dominion.
  - Additionally, Jurassic World Dominion became the 50th film to gross $1 billion worldwide.
- The Marvel Cinematic Universe became the first film franchise to gross $26 billion, $27 billion, and $28 billion with the releases of Doctor Strange in the Multiverse of Madness, Thor: Love and Thunder, and Black Panther: Wakanda Forever.
- The Despicable Me and Shrek franchises became the first animated film franchises and the 15th and 17th overall film franchises to gross $4 billion with the release of Minions: The Rise of Gru and Puss in Boots: The Last Wish.

==== Studio records ====
- With the release of Avatar: The Way of Water, Walt Disney Studios Motion Pictures led over other film distributors in worldwide box office grosses and crossed the $4.9 billion mark for the eighth year. Disney's cumulative gross was generated from 16 film releases across its various studio divisions.
- Top Gun: Maverick became the highest-grossing film distributed solely by Paramount Pictures worldwide, surpassing Transformers: Dark of the Moon (2011), and also Paramount's highest-grossing film in the United States and Canada, surpassing Titanic (1997).

==== Film records ====
- Avatar: The Way of Water became the 51st film to gross $1 billion worldwide, the sixth film to gross $2 billion worldwide, the sixth-fastest film to cross the billion-dollar mark at 14 days, the second fastest to gross the $2 billion mark, the highest-grossing film of 2022, and the highest-grossing film of the COVID-19 pandemic era.
  - It had the 11th-biggest global opening of all time and the third-biggest global opening for a film in the pandemic era behind Spider-Man: No Way Home and Doctor Strange in the Multiverse of Madness, earning $441.7 million in its first weekend.
  - It also achieved the second-highest global opening weekend ever for a film released in IMAX cinemas with $48.8 million.
- Top Gun: Maverick became the 49th film to gross $1 billion worldwide.
  - Additionally, the film surpassed Mission: Impossible – Fallout (2018) to become Tom Cruise's highest-grossing film of all time at the worldwide box office and also surpassed War of the Worlds (2005) to become Cruise's highest-grossing film at the domestic box office.
  - It also passed The Mummy (2017) as Cruise's biggest opening weekend at the worldwide box office and also passed War of the Worlds (2005) as Cruise's biggest opening at the domestic box office and his first film to open to over $100 million in the U.S.
  - Top Gun: Maverick also passed Shrek 2 (2004) for the lowest second-weekend drop (29%) for a film that opened to over $100 million.
  - It also passed Pirates of the Caribbean: At World's End (2007), another Jerry Bruckheimer produced movie, to have the highest Memorial Day opening weekend and passed Shrek 2 (2004) to have the lowest second-weekend drop for a movie that made over $100 million in its opening weekend.
- Jurassic World Dominion became the 50th film to gross $1 billion worldwide.
  - The Jurassic Park film franchise grossed over $6 billion with the release of Jurassic World Dominion.
- Doctor Strange in the Multiverse of Madness surpassed Spider-Man 3 (2007) to become director Sam Raimi's highest-grossing film.
- Minions: The Rise of Gru became the highest-grossing animated film released since the COVID-19 pandemic, surpassing the 2020 anime film Demon Slayer: Mugen Train.
- Black Panther: Wakanda Forever attained the biggest opening weekend ever for a film released in the month of November in the U.S. and Canada with $181.3 million.
  - It was also the third-biggest opening weekend for a film in the U.S. and Canada during the pandemic era, behind Spider-Man: No Way Home and Doctor Strange in the Multiverse of Madness.
  - Disney Africa reported that the film set an all-time box office record in West Africa and had the biggest opening of 2022 in East Africa, as well as the second-highest box office gross ever in Southern Africa.
  - In Nigeria, it achieved the highest opening weekend ever for a film.
- Avatar became the first movie to gross more than $2.9 billion worldwide, following a worldwide re-release.
- KGF: Chapter 2 becomes the most-liked trailer and teaser on YouTube with 9 million likes, surpassing Avengers: Infinity War's likes.

== Events ==
- March 11 - Everything Everywhere All at Once premieres at South by Southwest, becoming a cultural phenomenon in the independent film community and eventually A24's highest-grossing film at the time.
- April – DNA testing indicates that Marilyn Monroe's biological father was Charles S. Gifford, her mother's line manager at a film studio.
- April 8 – AT&T sells WarnerMedia, the parent company of Warner Bros., to Discovery, Inc., which then reorganizes to form the new media company Warner Bros. Discovery.
- September 10 - The Fabelmans premieres at the 2022 Toronto International Film Festival, where it won the festival's People's Choice Award and marked the film's director Steven Spielberg's first film premiere at the festival.

=== Award ceremonies ===
2022 film award ceremonies
Date	Event	Host	Location(s)	Ref.
January 9	79th Golden Globe Awards	Hollywood Foreign Press Association	Beverly Hills, California, U.S.	
January 29	9th Feroz Awards	Asociación de Informadores Cinematográficos de España	Zaragoza, Spain	
February 12	36th Goya Awards	Academy of Cinematographic Arts and Sciences of Spain	Valencia, Spain	
February 12	11th Magritte Awards	Académie André Delvaux	Brussels, Belgium	
February 25	47th César Awards	Académie des Arts et Techniques du Cinéma	Paris, France	
February 27	28th Screen Actors Guild Awards	SAG-AFTRA	Los Angeles, California, U.S.	
March 6	37th Independent Spirit Awards	Independent Spirit Awards	Santa Monica, California, U.S.	
March 6	14th Gaudí Awards	Catalan Film Academy	Barcelona, Spain	
March 11	2022 American Film Institute Awards	Beverly Wilshire Hotel	Beverly Hills, California, U.S.	
March 12	74th Directors Guild of America Awards	Directors Guild of America	Beverly Hills, California, U.S.	
March 12	49th Annie Awards	ASIFA-Hollywood	Los Angeles, California, U.S.	
March 13	27th Critics' Choice Awards	Broadcast Film Critics Association	Los Angeles, California, U.S.	
March 13	75th British Academy Film Awards	British Academy of Film and Television Arts	London, England, UK	
March 14	30th Actors and Actresses Union Awards	Actors and Actresses Union	Madrid, Spain	
March 15	National Board of Review Awards 2021	National Board of Review	New York City, New York, U.S.	
March 19	33rd Producers Guild of America Awards	Producers Guild of America	Beverly Hills, California, U.S.	
March 20	74th Writers Guild of America Awards	Writers Guild of America, East; Writers Guild of America West	Los Angeles, California, U.S. and New York City, New York, U.S.	
March 26	42nd Golden Raspberry Awards	Golden Raspberry Awards Foundation	Los Angeles, California, U.S.	
March 27	94th Academy Awards	Academy of Motion Picture Arts and Sciences	Los Angeles, California, U.S.	
May 1	9th Platino Awards	EGEDA, FIPCA	Madrid, Spain	
May 3	67th David di Donatello	Accademia del Cinema Italiano	Rome, Italy	
3–4 June	22nd International Indian Film Academy Awards	International Indian Film Academy	Abu Dhabi, United Arab Emirates	
July 17	40th Hong Kong Film Awards	Hong Kong Film Awards Association Ltd.	Hong Kong	
August 30	67th Filmfare Awards	The Times Group	Mumbai, Maharashtra, India	
September 10–11	10th South Indian International Movie Awards	Vibri Media Group	Bengaluru, Karnataka, India	
September 29	8th APAN Star Awards	Korea Entertainment Management Association	Ilsanseo-gu, Goyang, Gyeonggi Province, South Korea	
September 30	Chunsa Film Art Awards 2022	Korean Film Directors Association	Sowol Art Hall, Seoul, South Korea	
October 6	31st Buil Film Awards	Busan Ilbo	Busan, South Korea	
October 25	47th Saturn Awards	Academy of Science Fiction, Fantasy and Horror Films	Los Angeles, California, U.S.	
December 6	48th People's Choice Awards	People's Choice Awards	Santa Monica, California, U.S.	
December 17	28th Forqué Awards	EGEDA	Madrid, Spain	

=== Film festivals ===
List of some of the film festivals for 2022 that have been accredited by the International Federation of Film Producers Associations (FIAPF).

2022 film festivals
Date	Event	Host	Location(s)	Ref.
January 20 – 30	2022 Sundance Film Festival	Sundance Film Festival	Park City, Utah, United States	
January 26 – February 6	51st International Film Festival Rotterdam	International Film Festival Rotterdam	Rotterdam, Netherlands	
February 10 – 20	72nd Berlin International Film Festival	Berlin International Film Festival	Berlin, Germany	
March 18 – 27	25th Málaga Film Festival	Málaga Film Festival	Málaga, Spain	
April 26 – May 1	24th Kristiansand International Children's Film Festival	Kristiansand International Children's Film Festival	Kristiansand, Norway	
May 17 – 28	2022 Cannes Film Festival	Cannes Film Festival	Cannes, France	
July 7 – 17	26th Bucheon International Fantastic Film Festival	Bucheon International Fantastic Film Festival	Bucheon, South Korea	
August 3 – 13	75th Locarno Film Festival	Locarno Film Festival	Locarno, Switzerland	
August 31 – September 10	79th Venice International Film Festival	Venice International Film Festival	Venice, Italy	
September 8 – 18	2022 Toronto International Film Festival	Toronto International Film Festival	Toronto, Ontario, Canada	
September 16 – 24	70th San Sebastián International Film Festival	San Sebastián International Film Festival	San Sebastián, Spain	
October 5 – 14	27th Busan International Film Festival	Busan International Film Festival	Busan, South Korea	
November 20–28	53rd International Film Festival of India	Directorate of Film Festivals	Goa, India	

== Awards ==
Category/Organization	80th Golden Globe Awards January 10, 2023		28th Critics' Choice Awards January 15, 2023	76th BAFTA Awards February 19, 2023	Producers, Directors, Screen Actors, and Writers Guild Awards February 18 - March 5, 2023	95th Academy Awards March 12, 2023
Category/Organization	Drama	Musical or Comedy	28th Critics' Choice Awards January 15, 2023	76th BAFTA Awards February 19, 2023	Producers, Directors, Screen Actors, and Writers Guild Awards February 18 - March 5, 2023	95th Academy Awards March 12, 2023
Best Picture	The Fabelmans	The Banshees of Inisherin	Everything Everywhere All at Once	All Quiet on the Western Front	Everything Everywhere All at Once	
Best Director	Steven Spielberg; The Fabelmans		Daniel Kwan and Daniel Scheinert; Everything Everywhere All at Once	Edward Berger; All Quiet on the Western Front	Daniel Kwan and Daniel Scheinert; Everything Everywhere All at Once	
Best Actor	Austin Butler; Elvis	Colin Farrell; The Banshees of Inisherin	Brendan Fraser; The Whale	Austin Butler; Elvis	Brendan Fraser; The Whale	
Best Actress	Cate Blanchett; Tár	Michelle Yeoh; Everything Everywhere All at Once	Cate Blanchett; Tár		Michelle Yeoh; Everything Everywhere All at Once	
Best Supporting Actor	Ke Huy Quan; Everything Everywhere All at Once			Barry Keoghan; The Banshees of Inisherin	Ke Huy Quan; Everything Everywhere All at Once	
Best Supporting Actress	Angela Bassett; Black Panther: Wakanda Forever			Kerry Condon; The Banshees of Inisherin	Jamie Lee Curtis; Everything Everywhere All at Once	
Best Screenplay, Adapted	Martin McDonagh; The Banshees of Inisherin		Sarah Polley; Women Talking	Edward Berger, Lesley Paterson and Ian Stokell; All Quiet on the Western Front	Sarah Polley; Women Talking	
Best Screenplay, Original	Martin McDonagh; The Banshees of Inisherin		Daniel Kwan and Daniel Scheinert; Everything Everywhere All at Once	Martin McDonagh; The Banshees of Inisherin	Daniel Kwan and Daniel Scheinert; Everything Everywhere All at Once	
Best Animated Film	Guillermo del Toro's Pinocchio					
Best Original Score	Justin Hurwitz; Babylon		Hildur Guðnadóttir; Tár	Volker Bertelmann; All Quiet on the Western Front	—N/a	Volker Bertelmann; All Quiet on the Western Front
Best Original Song	"Naatu Naatu"; RRR			—N/a	—N/a	"Naatu Naatu"; RRR
Best Foreign Language Film	Argentina, 1985		RRR	All Quiet on the Western Front	—N/a	All Quiet on the Western Front
Best Documentary (Note: From 2016 onward, the category was shifted from the Critics' Choice Awards to the ancillary Critics' Choice Documentary Awards.)	—N/a		Good Night Oppy; Fire of Love; Navalny (tie)	Navalny		

Palme d'Or (75th Cannes Film Festival):

Triangle of Sadness, directed by Ruben Östlund, Sweden

Golden Lion (79th Venice International Film Festival):

All the Beauty and the Bloodshed, directed by Laura Poitras, United States

Golden Bear (72nd Berlin International Film Festival):

Alcarràs, directed by Carla Simón, Spain

People's Choice Award (47th Toronto International Film Festival):

The Fabelmans, directed by Steven Spielberg, United States

== 2022 films ==
=== By country/region ===
- List of American films of 2022
- List of Australian films of 2022
- List of British films of 2022
- List of Bangladeshi films of 2022
- List of Canadian films of 2022
- List of Chinese films of 2022
- List of French films of 2022
- List of Hong Kong films of 2022
- List of Indian films of 2022
- List of Italian films of 2022
- List of Japanese films of 2022
- List of Nigerian films of 2022
- List of Pakistani films of 2022
- List of Portuguese films of 2022
- List of Philippine films of 2022
- List of Russian films of 2022
- List of South Korean films of 2022
- List of Spanish films of 2022

=== By genre/medium ===
- List of action films of 2022
- List of animated feature films of 2022
- List of avant-garde films of 2022
- List of crime films of 2022
- List of comedy films of 2022
- List of drama films of 2022
- List of horror films of 2022
- List of science fiction films of 2022
- List of thriller films of 2022

== Deaths ==
Month	Date	Name	Age	Country	Profession	Notable films	Ref.
January	1	Barbara Chilcott	99	Canada	Actress	Lies My Father Told Me; The Full Treatment	
January	1	Paul Hubschmid	84	Switzerland	Actor	Bagdad; The Beast from 20,000 Fathoms	
January	1	Max Julien	88	US	Actor	The Mack; Getting Straight	
January	3	Mario Lanfranchi	94	Italy	Director, Screenwriter	Death Sentence; The Mistress Is Served	
January	4	Joan Copeland	99	US	Actress	The Peacemaker; Brother Bear	
January	5	George Rossi	60	UK	Actor	Comfort and Joy; Roseanna's Grave	
January	6	Peter Bogdanovich	82	US	Director, Screenwriter, Actor	The Last Picture Show; Paper Moon	
January	6	Sidney Poitier	94	US	Actor, Director	In the Heat of the Night; Lilies of the Field	
January	7	Mark Forest	89	US	Actor	Goliath and the Dragon; Son of Samson	
January	8	Marilyn Bergman	93	US	Songwriter	The Way We Were; The Thomas Crown Affair	
January	9	Dwayne Hickman	87	US	Actor	Cat Ballou; A Night at the Roxbury	
January	9	Bob Saget	65	US	Actor, Comedian, Director	Critical Condition; Dirty Work	
January	10	Gary Waldhorn	78	UK	Actor	Escape to Victory; Zeppelin	
January	11	Christian Gasc	76	France	Costume Designer	Ridicule; Farewell, My Queen	
January	13	Jean-Jacques Beineix	75	France	Director, Screenwriter	Diva; Betty Blue	
January	13	Leon Lissek	82	Australia	Actor	Nicholas and Alexandra; Time Bandits	
January	14	Carol Speed	76	US	Actress	The New Centurions; Abby	
January	15	Jean-Claude Lord	78	Canada	Director, Screenwriter, Film Editor	Visiting Hours; Tadpole and the Whale	
January	17	Michel Subor	86	France	Actor	Topaz; Le petit soldat	
January	18	Yvette Mimieux	80	US	Actress	The Time Machine; The Black Hole	
January	18	Peter Robbins	65	US	Actor	A Boy Named Charlie Brown; Good Times	
January	19	Hardy Krüger	93	Germany	Actor	Barry Lyndon; A Bridge Too Far	
January	19	Gaspard Ulliel	37	France	Actor	It's Only the End of the World; Hannibal Rising	
January	20	Meat Loaf	74	US	Singer, Actor	The Rocky Horror Picture Show; Fight Club	
January	20	Camillo Milli	92	Italy	Actor	Il Marchese del Grillo; We Have a Pope	
January	21	Louie Anderson	68	US	Actor, Comedian	Coming to America; Quicksilver	
January	21	Mace Neufeld	93	US	Producer	The Hunt for Red October; The Equalizer	
January	22	Kathryn Kates	73	US	Actress	The Many Saints of Newark; Pastime	
January	23	Renato Cecchetto	70	Italy	Actor	All My Friends Part 2; The Story of Piera	
January	23	Serge Korber	85	France	Director, Screenwriter	Hearth Fires; A Little Virtuous	
January	23	Rolf Zehetbauer	92	Germany	Production Designer	Cabaret; Enemy Mine	
January	24	Ayberk Pekcan	51	Turkey	Actor	Mustang; Winter Sleep	
January	25	Etchika Choureau	92	France	Actress	I Vinti; Children of Love	
January	27	Kenneth Wannberg	91	US	Composer, Music Editor	The Philadelphia Experiment; Schindler's List	
January	29	Howard Hesseman	81	US	Actor	About Schmidt; The Rocker	
January	29	Pete Smith	63	New Zealand	Actor	Once Were Warriors; The Piano	
January	30	Leonid Kuravlyov	85	Russia	Actor	Viy; Ivan Vasilievich: Back to the Future	
January	30	Robert Wall	82	US	Actor	The Way of the Dragon; Enter the Dragon	
January	31	Carleton Carpenter	95	US	Actor	Up Periscope; The Prowler	
February	1	Paolo Graziosi	82	Italy	Actor	China Is Near; Il Divo	
February	2	Robert Blalack	73	US	Visual Effects Artist	Star Wars; Airplane!	
February	2	Ezio Frigerio	91	Italy	Art Director, Costume Designer	Cyrano de Bergerac; I cannibali	
February	2	Monica Vitti	90	Italy	Actress	L'Avventura; Red Desert	
February	3	Dieter Mann	80	Germany	Actor	Downfall; 13 Semester	
February	6	Frank Pesce	75	US	Actor	Beverly Hills Cop; Midnight Run	
February	7	Margarita Lozano	90	Spain	Actress	A Fistful of Dollars; Viridiana	
February	7	Douglas Trumbull	79	US	Visual Effects Artist, Director	Blade Runner; The Andromeda Strain	
February	8	Rosalind Miles	82	US	Actress	Shaft's Big Score!; Friday Foster	
February	9	Alicia Hermida	89	Spain	Actress, Acting Coach	Sweet Hours; El bosque animado	
February	9	André Wilms	74	France	Actor	Le Havre; Europa Europa	
February	12	Ivan Reitman	75	Canada	Director, Producer	Ghostbusters; Dave	
February	12	Beryl Vertue	90	UK	Producer	Tommy; Steptoe and Son	
February	13	Enzo Robutti	88	Italy	Actor, Comedian	Bingo Bongo; The Godfather Part III	
February	14	Alfred Sole	78	US	Director, Production Designer	Alice, Sweet Alice; Glory Daze	
February	15	Arnaldo Jabor	81	Brazil	Director, Screenwriter	All Nudity Shall Be Punished; Pindorama	
February	17	David Brenner	59	US	Film Editor	Born on the Fourth of July; Independence Day	
February	17	Billy Watson	98	US	Actor	Mr. Smith Goes to Washington; In Old Chicago	
February	18	Leo Fong	93	China	Actor, Director	Blind Rage; Killpoint	
February	18	Brad Johnson	62	US	Actor	Always; Flight of the Intruder	
February	20	Stewart Bevan	73	UK	Actor	To Sir, with Love; Brannigan	
February	21	Chor Yuen	87	Hong Kong	Director, Actor, Screenwriter	Death Duel; Police Story	
February	22	Anna Karen	85	South Africa	Actress	Beautiful Thing; Mutiny on the Buses	
February	24	Sally Kellerman	84	US	Actress, Singer	M*A*S*H; Brewster McCloud	
February	25	Laurel Goodwin	79	US	Actress	Girls! Girls! Girls!; Papa's Delicate Condition	
February	27	Veronica Carlson	77	UK	Actress	Dracula Has Risen from the Grave; Vampira	
February	27	Ned Eisenberg	65	US	Actor	Flags of Our Fathers; Limitless	
February	28	Kirk Baily	59	US	Actor	Bottle Shock; Bumblebee	
March	1	Conrad Janis	94	US	Actor	The Brasher Doubloon; That Hagen Girl	
March	2	Johnny Brown	84	US	Actor, Singer	The Out-of-Towners; Life	
March	2	Alan Ladd Jr.	84	US	Producer, Executive	Braveheart; Gone Baby Gone	
March	2	Tony Walton	87	UK	Production Designer, Costume Designer	Murder on the Orient Express; All That Jazz	
March	2	Corey Yuen	71	Hong Kong	Director, Action Choreographer	Fist of Fury; The New Legend of Shaolin	
March	3	Tim Considine	81	US	Actor	The Shaggy Dog; Patton	
March	4	Mitchell Ryan	88	US	Actor	Lethal Weapon; Liar Liar	
March	5	Lynda Baron	82	UK	Actress, Singer	Yentl; Scoop	
March	5	Elguja Burduli	80	Georgia	Actor	Dark Eyes; Hard to Be a God	
March	7	Jeremy Child	77	UK	Actor	A Fish Called Wanda; Darkest Hour	
March	8	Ron Pember	87	UK	Actor	Aces High; Murder by Decree	
March	9	John Korty	85	US	Director, Animator	Alex & the Gypsy; Oliver's Story	
March	9	Jimmy Lydon	98	US	Actor	Twice Blessed; Life with Father	
March	10	Emilio Delgado	81	US	Actor	Follow That Bird; The Adventures of Elmo in Grouchland	
March	11	Rustam Ibragimbekov	83	Azerbaijan	Screenwriter	Burnt by the Sun; The Barber of Siberia	
March	12	Robert Vincent O'Neil	91	US	Director, Screenwriter	Angel; Wonder Women	
March	12	Biagio Proietti	81	Italy	Screenwriter	Death Occurred Last Night; The Black Cat	
March	13	William Hurt	71	US	Actor	Kiss of the Spider Woman; Broadcast News	
March	14	Akira Takarada	87	Japan	Actor	Godzilla; Latitude Zero	
March	16	Helene Vannari	73	Estonia	Actress	All My Lenins; Georg	
March	17	Peter Bowles	85	UK	Actor	Blowup; The Bank Job	
March	18	Pepper Martin	85	Canada	Actor	Walking Tall; Superman II	
March	19	Alan Hopgood	87	Australia	Actor	My Brilliant Career; Evil Angels	
March	21	Waldemar Bergendahl	88	Sweden	Producer	My Life as a Dog; Adam & Eva	
March	21	Lawrence Dane	84	Canada	Actor	Scanners; Bride of Chucky	
March	21	Vitaly Melnikov	93	Russia	Director, Screenwriter	Poor Poor Paul; Mama Married	
March	21	Eva Ingeborg Scholz	94	Germany	Actress	Emil and the Detectives; The Lost One	
March	24	Denise Coffey	85	UK	Actress	Far from the Madding Crowd; Saving Grace	
March	25	Kathryn Hays	88	US	Actress	Ride Beyond Vengeance; Counterpoint	
March	26	Bang Jun-seok	51	South Korea	Composer	Joint Security Area; Escape from Mogadishu	
March	26	Gianni Cavina	81	Italy	Actor	The House with Laughing Windows; Il turno	
March	27	Lars Bloch	83	Denmark	Actor	The Ravine; Fantozzi contro tutti	
March	27	Valora Noland	80	US	Actress	Beach Party; The War Wagon	
March	29	Paul Herman	76	US	Actor	Silver Linings Playbook; The Irishman	
April	1	Aleksandra Yakovleva	64	Russia	Actress	Air Crew; Flight Crew	
April	2	Estelle Harris	93	US	Actress	Toy Story; Once Upon a Time in America	
April	3	June Brown	95	UK	Actress	Misunderstood; Bean	
April	4	Kathy Lamkin	74	US	Actress	No Country for Old Men; Waiting for Guffman	
April	5	Nehemiah Persoff	102	US	Actor	Some Like It Hot; Yentl	
April	5	Jimmy Wang Yu	79	Taiwan	Actor, Director, Producer	Master of the Flying Guillotine; Dragon	
April	6	Rae Allen	95	US	Actress	A League of Their Own; Reign Over Me	
April	8	Massimo Cristaldi	66	Italy	Producer	Salvo; Sicilian Ghost Story	
April	9	Michael Degen	90	Germany	Actor	Dr. M; Beyond Good and Evil	
April	9	Jeremy Young	87	UK	Actor	Crooks and Coronets; Hopscotch	
April	12	Sonny Caldinez	89	Trinidad	Actor	Raiders of the Lost Ark; The Fifth Element	
April	12	Gilbert Gottfried	67	US	Actor, Comedian	Aladdin; Beverly Hills Cop II	
April	13	Michel Bouquet	96	France	Actor	Toto the Hero; How I Killed My Father	
April	14	Rio Hackford	51	US	Actor	Sherrybaby; Jonah Hex	
April	15	Liz Sheridan	93	US	Actress	Star 80; Who's That Girl	
April	17	James Olson	91	US	Actor	Rachel, Rachel; The Andromeda Strain	
April	17	Catherine Spaak	77	France	Actress, Singer	Il Sorpasso; The Cat o' Nine Tails	
April	18	Andrzej Korzyński	82	Poland	Composer	Possession; Man of Marble	
April	20	Robert Morse	90	US	Actor	The Loved One; How to Succeed in Business Without Really Trying	
April	21	Jacques Perrin	80	France	Actor, Producer	Z; Cinema Paradiso	
April	26	Ann Davies	87	UK	Actress	Peter's Friends; In the Bleak Midwinter	
April	26	Klaus Schulze	74	Germany	Composer	Angst; Next of Kin	
April	27	David Birney	83	US	Actor	Oh, God! Book II; Trial by Combat	
April	27	Bob Elkins	89	US	Actor	Coal Miner's Daughter; The Dream Catcher	
April	27	Kenneth Tsang	86	Hong Kong	Actor	The Killer; A Better Tomorrow	
April	28	Juan Diego	79	Spain	Actor	The Dumbfounded King; Go Away from Me	
April	28	Harold Livingston	97	US	Screenwriter	Star Trek: The Motion Picture; The Hell with Heroes	
April	29	Joanna Barnes	87	US	Actress	Spartacus; The Parent Trap	
May	1	Charles Siebert	84	US	Actor	...And Justice for All; Coma	
May	3	Lino Capolicchio	78	Italy	Actor	The Garden of the Finzi-Continis; Fiorile	
May	3	Andra Martin	86	US	Actress	The Thing That Couldn't Die; Up Periscope	
May	5	Mike Hagerty	67	US	Actor	Wayne's World; Overboard	
May	5	Faye Marlowe	95	US	Actress	Hangover Square; Junior Miss	
May	5	Kenneth Welsh	80	Canada	Actor	Legends of the Fall; The Day After Tomorrow	
May	7	Kang Soo-yeon	55	South Korea	Actress	Girls' Night Out; The Surrogate Woman	
May	7	Jack Kehler	75	US	Actor	The Big Lebowski; Fever Pitch	
May	7	Bruce MacVittie	65	US	Actor	Million Dollar Baby; Lonely Hearts	
May	8	John R. Cherry III	73	US	Director, Screenwriter	Ernest Goes to Camp; Ernest Goes to Jail	
May	8	Fred Ward	79	US	Actor	The Right Stuff; Tremors	
May	8	Dennis Waterman	74	UK	Actor, Singer	Scars of Dracula; Man in the Wilderness	
May	9	Qin Yi	100	China	Actress	Far Away Love; Troubled Laughter	
May	11	June Preston	93	US	Actress	Anne of Green Gables; Happy Land	
May	14	Breno Silveira	58	Brazil	Director, Cinematographer	Two Sons of Francisco; The Man of the Year	
May	15	Rainer Basedow	83	Germany	Actor	Four Times That Night; Das Rad	
May	15	Klara Höfels	73	Germany	Actress	Toni Erdmann; Cut Off	
May	15	Maggie Peterson	81	US	Actress, Location Manager	The Love God?; Pay It Forward	
May	15	Jerzy Trela	80	Poland	Actor	Man of Iron; Ida	
May	16	Josef Abrhám	82	Czech Republic	Actor	Kafka; I Served the King of England	
May	16	John Aylward	75	US	Actor	Thirteen Days; The Crazies	
May	17	Vangelis	79	Greece	Composer	Blade Runner; Chariots of Fire	
May	18	Linda Lawson	86	US	Actress, Singer	Night Tide; Apache Rifles	
May	19	Chete Lera	72	Spain	Actor	Open Your Eyes; The Red Squirrel	
May	20	Susan Roces	80	Philippines	Actress	Mga Bituin ng Kinabukasan; Mano Po 2: My Home	
May	21	Colin Cantwell	90	US	Concept Artist	Star Wars; WarGames	
May	21	Peter Koper	75	US	Producer, Screenwriter, Actor	Island of the Dead; Hairspray	
May	22	Greg Jein	76	US	Model Maker	Close Encounters of the Third Kind; Avatar	
May	23	Jamie Bartlett	55	South Africa	Actor	Red Dust; Mandela: Long Walk to Freedom	
May	24	Maurizio Silvi	73	Italy	Makeup Artist	Moulin Rouge!; The Great Beauty	
May	25	Gary Nelson	87	US	Director	The Black Hole; Freaky Friday	
May	26	Ray Liotta	67	US	Actor	Goodfellas; Field of Dreams	
May	26	George Shapiro	91	US	Producer	Summer School; Man on the Moon	
May	28	Bo Hopkins	84	US	Actor	American Graffiti; Midnight Express	
May	28	Marino Masé	83	Italy	Actor	The Leopard; The Godfather Part III	
May	29	Ronnie Hawkins	87	US	Singer, Actor	Heaven's Gate; Snake Eater	
May	30	Milton Gonçalves	88	Brazil	Actor	Kiss of the Spider Woman; Carandiru	
June	1	May Routh	87	UK	Costume Designer	Being There; Ronin	
June	2	Uri Zohar	86	Israel	Director	Bloomfield; Three Days and a Child	
June	3	Anna Maria Tatò	82	Italy	Director, Screenwriter	The Night and the Moment; I Remember	
June	7	Tommy Dysart	86	Australia	Actor	The Man from Snowy River; Next of Kin	
June	7	Raivo Trass	76	Estonia	Actor	Viimne reliikvia; Tangerines	
June	9	Matt Zimmerman	87	Canada	Actor	Thunderbirds Are Go; A Man for All Seasons	
June	12	Philip Baker Hall	90	US	Actor	Magnolia; Boogie Nights	
June	13	Henri Garcin	93	Belgium	Actor	The Pink Panther; The Woman Next Door	
June	15	Maureen Arthur	88	US	Actress	The Love God?; How to Commit Marriage	
June	17	Jean-Louis Trintignant	91	France	Actor	The Conformist; A Man and a Woman	
June	19	Carol Raye	99	Australia	Actress, Singer	Strawberry Roan; Green Fingers	
June	21	Duncan Henderson	72	US	Producer	Master and Commander: The Far Side of the World; Oblivion	
June	21	Artie Kane	93	US	Composer, Conductor	Looking for Mr. Goodbar; Good Will Hunting	
June	22	Robert A. Katz	79	US	Producer	Gettysburg; Selena	
June	23	Ernst Jacobi	88	Germany	Actor	The Tin Drum; The White Ribbon	
June	23	Massimo Morante	69	Italy	Composer	Deep Red; Suspiria	
June	23	Tommy Morgan	89	US	Musician	Spider-Man 2; Toy Story 3	
June	26	Raffaele La Capria	99	Italy	Screenwriter	Hands over the City; Many Wars Ago	
June	26	Mary Mara	61	US	Actress	Bound; A Civil Action	
June	26	Frank Williams	90	UK	Actor	Dad's Army; Jabberwocky	
June	27	Joe Turkel	94	US	Actor	Blade Runner; The Shining	
June	28	Cüneyt Arkın	84	Turkey	Actor, Director, Screenwriter	Love and Grudge; Ottoman Eagle	
June	28	Hichem Rostom	75	Tunisia	Actor	The English Patient; Whatever Lola Wants	
July	1	Maurizio Pradeaux	91	Italy	Director, Screenwriter	Churchill's Leopards; Death Carries a Cane	
July	2	Peter Brook	97	UK	Director, Screenwriter	Lord of the Flies; King Lear	
July	2	Susana Dosamantes	74	Mexico	Actress	Rio Lobo; Blacker Than the Night	
July	2	Alex Law	69	Hong Kong	Director, Screenwriter	Painted Faces; Echoes of the Rainbow	
July	2	Brian Jackson	91	UK	Actor	Revenge of the Pink Panther; Saint Maud	
July	3	Lennart Hjulström	83	Sweden	Actor	My Life as a Dog; Evil	
July	3	Ni Kuang	87	Hong Kong	Screenwriter	Five Deadly Venoms; One-Armed Swordsman	
July	4	Mona Hammond	91	Jamaica	Actress	Manderlay; Kinky Boots	
July	5	Lenny Von Dohlen	63	US	Actor	Electric Dreams; Twin Peaks: Fire Walk with Me	
July	6	James Caan	82	US	Actor	The Godfather; Misery	
July	8	Gregory Itzin	74	US	Actor	Evolution; Lincoln	
July	8	Tony Sirico	79	US	Actor	Bullets Over Broadway; Goodfellas	
July	8	Larry Storch	99	US	Actor	The Great Race; Airport 1975	
July	9	L. Q. Jones	94	US	Actor, Director	The Wild Bunch; Casino	
July	11	Terence Macartney-Filgate	97	UK	Director, Cinematographer	Fields of Endless Day; Symbiopsychotaxiplasm	
July	11	Monty Norman	94	UK	Composer	Dr. No; The Two Faces of Dr. Jekyll	
July	13	Charlotte Valandrey	53	France	Actress	Red Kiss; Orlando	
July	14	Christian Doermer	87	Germany	Actor, Director	Love at Twenty; Oh! What a Lovely War	
July	14	Germano Longo	89	Italy	Actor	Sunflower; Claretta and Ben	
July	16	Mickey Rooney Jr.	77	US	Actor	Hot Rods to Hell; Honeysuckle Rose	
July	18	Rebecca Balding	73	US	Actress	The Silent Scream; The Boogens	
July	18	Dani	77	France	Actress, Singer	Day for Night; Love on the Run	
July	19	William Richert	79	US	Actor, Director	Winter Kills; My Own Private Idaho	
July	21	Taurean Blacque	82	US	Actor	Rocky II; DeepStar Six	
July	22	Carla Cassola	74	Italy	Actress	Captain America; Dangerous Beauty	
July	23	Aaron Latham	78	US	Screenwriter	Urban Cowboy; The Program	
July	23	Bob Rafelson	89	US	Director, Screenwriter, Producer	Five Easy Pieces; The King of Marvin Gardens	
July	24	Berta Riaza	94	Spain	Actress	Ten Ready Rifles; Entre tinieblas	
July	24	David Warner	80	UK	Actor	Time Bandits; Titanic	
July	25	Yoko Shimada	69	Japan	Actress	Castle of Sand; Crying Freeman	
July	25	Paul Sorvino	83	US	Actor	Goodfellas; Reds	
July	27	Mary Alice	85	US	Actress	Awakenings; The Matrix Revolutions	
July	27	Tony Dow	77	US	Actor	The Kentucky Fried Movie; Back to the Beach	
July	27	Burt Metcalfe	87	Canada	Actor	The Canadians; Gidget	
July	27	Bernard Cribbins	93	UK	Actor	Frenzy; The Wrong Arm of the Law	
July	29	Tom Richmond	72	US	Cinematographer	Stand and Deliver; Slums of Beverly Hills	
July	30	George Bartenieff	89	US	Actor	See No Evil, Hear No Evil; Julie & Julia	
July	30	Pat Carroll	95	US	Actress	The Little Mermaid; Freedom Writers	
July	30	Kiyoshi Kobayashi	89	Japan	Voice Actor	The Castle of Cagliostro; Lupin III	
July	30	Nichelle Nichols	89	US	Actress	Star Trek; Snow Dogs	
July	30	Roberto Nobile	74	Italy	Actor	Everybody's Fine; We Have a Pope	
July	31	John Steiner	81	UK	Actor	Tenebrae; Caligula	
August	1	Paul Eenhoorn	73	Australia	Actor	This Is Martin Bonner; Land Ho!	
August	1	Hiroshi Ōtake	90	Japan	Actor	Fist of the North Star; Akira	
August	3	Shirley Barrett	61	Australia	Director, Screenwriter	Love Serenade; South Solitary	
August	4	Adriana Roel	88	Mexico	Actress	Viva Maria!; Alucarda	
August	5	Cherie Gil	59	Philippines	Actress	Oro, Plata, Mata; Just a Stranger	
August	5	Clu Gulager	93	US	Actor	The Last Picture Show; The Return of the Living Dead	
August	7	Biyi Bandele	54	Nigeria	Director, Screenwriter	Half of a Yellow Sun; Fifty	
August	7	Roger E. Mosley	83	US	Actor	The Mack; McQ	
August	8	Lamont Dozier	81	US	Songwriter, Singer	Buster; Leonard Part 6	
August	8	Olivia Newton-John	73	Australia	Singer, Actress	Grease; Xanadu	
August	9	Gene LeBell	89	US	Stuntman, Actor	Total Recall; L.A. Confidential	
August	11 (Note: She was declared brain dead and officially pronounced dead on August 11, 2022, but she was kept on life support until August 14.)	Anne Heche	53	US	Actress	Donnie Brasco; Six Days, Seven Nights	
August	11	Manuel Ojeda	81	Mexico	Actor	Romancing the Stone; Herod's Law	
August	11	Pauline Stroud	92	UK	Actress	Lady Godiva Rides Again; Passport to Shame	
August	12	Wolfgang Petersen	81	Germany	Director, Producer, Screenwriter	Das Boot; In the Line of Fire	
August	13	Rossana Di Lorenzo	84	Italy	Actress	Flic Story; Le Bal	
August	13	Denise Dowse	64	US	Actress	Ray; Coach Carter	
August	14	Marshall Napier	70	New Zealand	Actor	Babe; The Water Horse: Legend of the Deep	
August	14	Kristaq Dhamo	89	Albania	Actor, Director	Tana; Qortimet e vjeshtës	
August	16	Duggie Brown	82	UK	Comedian, Actor	Kes; Between Two Women	
August	16	Eva-Maria Hagen	87	Germany	Singer, Actress	The Legend of Paul and Paula; Lore	
August	17	Motomu Kiyokawa	87	Japan	Actor	The End of Evangelion; Vampire Hunter D	
August	18	Robert Q. Lovett	95	US	Film Editor	The Cotton Club; A Bronx Tale	
August	18	Virginia Patton	97	US	Actress	It's a Wonderful Life; The Lucky Stiff	
August	18	Josephine Tewson	91	UK	Actress	The Hound of the Baskervilles; Wilt	
August	19	Leon Vitali	74	UK	Actor	Barry Lyndon; Eyes Wide Shut	
August	20	Masahiro Kobayashi	68	Japan	Director, Producer, Screenwriter	Bashing; The Rebirth	
August	21	Vincent Gil	83	Australia	Actor	Mad Max; Snapshot	
August	23	Gerald Potterton	91	UK	Director, Screenwriter, Animator	Heavy Metal; Yellow Submarine	
August	23	Winston Stona	82	Jamaica	Actor	Cool Runnings; The Harder They Come	
August	24	William Reynolds	90	US	Actor	All That Heaven Allows; Carrie	
August	25	Graziella Galvani	91	Italy	Actress	Pierrot le Fou; Seduction	
August	25	Enzo Garinei	96	Italy	Actor	Toto and Carolina; Banana Joe	
August	26	Espen Skjønberg	98	Norway	Actor	The Last Lieutenant; O' Horten	
August	27	Robert LuPone	76	US	Actor	Jesus Christ Superstar; Funny Games	
August	27	Amanda Mackey	70	US	Casting Director	A League of Their Own; The Fugitive	
August	28	Ralph Eggleston	56	US	Production Designer, Art Director	Toy Story; Finding Nemo	
August	29	Charlbi Dean	32	South Africa	Actress	Triangle of Sadness; An Interview with God	
September	4	Bo Brundin	85	Sweden	Actor	The Great Waldo Pepper; Raise the Titanic	
September	6	Ligia Borowczyk	89	Poland	Actress	La Jetée; Goto, Island of Love	
September	6	Just Jaeckin	82	France	Director, Screenwriter	Emmanuelle; Lady Chatterley's Lover	
September	7	David A. Arnold	54	US	Comedian, Actor	Whiteboyz; Bad Ass	
September	7	Marsha Hunt	104	US	Actress	Pride and Prejudice; Johnny Got His Gun	
September	9	Mark Miller	97	US	Actor, Screenwriter	Savannah Smiles; A Walk in the Clouds	
September	10	Jack Ging	90	US	Actor	Play Misty for Me; High Plains Drifter	
September	10	William Klein	94	US	Director, Screenwriter	Who Are You, Polly Maggoo?; Mr. Freedom	
September	11	Harry Landis	95	UK	Actor	Bitter Victory; Dunkirk	
September	11	Krishnam Raju	83	India	Actor, Producer	Bhakta Kannappa; Thandra Paparayudu	
September	11	Alain Tanner	92	Switzerland	Director, Screenwriter	The Salamander; Fourbi	
September	12	Jimmy Flynn	88	US	Transportation Coordinator, Actor	Good Will Hunting; The Cider House Rules	
September	13	Jack Charles	79	Australia	Actor	Mystery Road; Pan	
September	13	Jean-Luc Godard	91	France	Director, Screenwriter	Breathless; Contempt	
September	14	Irene Papas	93	Greece	Actress	Zorba the Greek; The Guns of Navarone	
September	14	Andy Romano	86	US	Actor	Beach Party; Under Siege	
September	14	Henry Silva	95	US	Actor	Ocean's 11; The Manchurian Candidate	
September	15	Axel Jodorowsky	57	Mexico	Actor	Santa Sangre; The Dance of Reality	
September	15	Radko Polič	80	Slovenia	Actor	Battle of Neretva; Silent Gunpowder	
September	15	Dennis Virkler	80	US	Film Editor	The Hunt for Red October; The Fugitive	
September	16	Marva Hicks	66	US	Singer, Actress	Virtuosity; Labor Day	
September	17	Anna Gaël	78	Hungary	Actress	The Bridge at Remagen; Sweeney 2	
September	19	Robert Brown	95	US	Actor	The Flame Barrier; Tower of London	
September	20	Sergei Puskepalis	56	Russia	Actor	Simple Things; How I Ended This Summer	
September	21	Lydia Alfonsi	94	Italy	Actress	Black Sabbath; Life Is Beautiful	
September	23	Louise Fletcher	88	US	Actress	One Flew Over the Cuckoo's Nest; Cruel Intentions	
September	23	Franciszek Pieczka	94	Poland	Actor	The Saragossa Manuscript; The Promised Land	
September	24	Rita Gardner	87	US	Singer, Actress	P.S. I Love You; Shiva Baby	
September	26	Venetia Stevenson	84	UK	Actress	Day of the Outlaw; The City of the Dead	
September	27	Joan Hotchkis	95	US	Actress	Breezy; Ode to Billy Joe	
September	28	Bruno Arena	65	Italy	Actor	Pinocchio; The Jokes	
September	28	Coolio	59	US	Rapper, Actor	Batman & Robin; Dear God	
October	2	Sacheen Littlefeather	75	US	Actress	Johnny Firecloud; Winterhawk	
October	4	Günter Lamprecht	92	Germany	Actor	The Marriage of Maria Braun; Das Boot	
October	5	Wolfgang Kohlhaase	91	Germany	Screenwriter	Mama, I'm Alive; The Legend of Rita	
October	6	Judy Tenuta	72	US	Comedian, Actress	Going Down in LA-LA Land; Love Bites	
October	7	Austin Stoker	92	Trinidad	Actor	Assault on Precinct 13; 3 from Hell	
October	8	Gabrielle Beaumont	80	UK	Director	The Godsend; He's My Girl	
October	9	Eileen Ryan	94	US	Actress	Parenthood; Magnolia	
October	9	Susan Tolsky	79	US	Actress	Love at First Bite; Pretty Maids All in a Row	
October	10	Roberto Bisacco	83	Italy	Actor	Torso; Romeo and Juliet	
October	10	Michael Callan	86	US	Actor	Cat Ballou; The Victors	
October	11	Doru Ana	68	Romania	Actor	The Death of Mr. Lazarescu; Silent Wedding	
October	11	André Brassard	76	Canada	Director, Actor	Once Upon a Time in the East; 2 Seconds	
October	11	Angela Lansbury	96	UK	Actress, Singer	The Manchurian Candidate; Beauty and the Beast	
October	13	Jeff Barnaby	46	Canada	Director, Screenwriter, Composer	Blood Quantum; Rhymes for Young Ghouls	
October	13	Mike Schank	53	US	Actor	Coven; Storytelling	
October	14	Robbie Coltrane	72	UK	Actor	Harry Potter; Mona Lisa	
October	14	Jan Rabson	68	US	Voice Actor	Toy Story 3; WALL-E	
October	14	Ted White	96	US	Stuntman, Actor	Escape from New York; Friday the 13th: The Final Chapter	
October	14	Ralf Wolter	95	Germany	Actor	One, Two, Three; Cabaret	
October	16	Josef Somr	88	Czech Republic	Actor	Closely Watched Trains; The Joke	
October	16	Ian Whittaker	94	UK	Set Decorator, Actor	Alien; Howards End	
October	20	Ron Masak	86	US	Actor	Ice Station Zebra; Tora! Tora! Tora!	
October	23	Michael Kopsa	66	Canada	Actor	Miracle; Watchmen	
October	24	Leslie Jordan	67	US	Actor	The Help; The United States vs. Billie Holiday	
October	24	Peter Yang	87	Hong Kong	Actor, Producer	Enter the Fat Dragon; Tragic Hero	
October	25	Jules Bass	87	US	Director, Producer, Lyricist	The Last Unicorn; Mad Monster Party?	
October	25	Leonie Forbes	85	Jamaica	Actress	Club Paradise; Milk and Honey	
October	28	Marvin March	92	US	Set Decorator	Ghostbusters; Addams Family Values	
October	31	Andrew Prine	86	US	Actor	The Miracle Worker; Gettysburg	
November	1	Lu Shuming	66	China	Actor	A Terra-Cotta Warrior; A Chinese Odyssey	
November	2	Alan Chui Chung-San	70	Hong Kong	Actor, Stuntman	7 Grandmasters; Vengeance	
November	3	Douglas McGrath	64	US	Screenwriter, Director, Actor	Emma; Bullets Over Broadway	
November	4	Toralv Maurstad	95	Norway	Actor	Song of Norway; The Pinchcliffe Grand Prix	
November	5	Aaron Carter	34	US	Actor, Singer	Fat Albert; Supercross	
November	5	Bill Treacher	92	UK	Actor	Tale of the Mummy; The Musketeer	
November	7	Leslie Phillips	98	UK	Actor	Carry On; Harry Potter	
November	8	Marie Poledňáková	81	Czech Republic	Director, Screenwriter	I Enjoy the World with You; You Kiss like a God	
November	8	Lohithaswa	80	India	Actor	Abhimanyu; Time Bomb	
November	10	Kevin Conroy	66	US	Actor, Voice Actor	Batman: Mask of the Phantasm; Yoga Hosers	
November	11	Sven-Bertil Taube	87	Sweden	Actor, Singer	Puppet on a Chain; The Eagle Has Landed	
November	12	David English	76	UK	Actor	A Bridge Too Far; Lisztomania	
November	12	Budd Friedman	90	US	Comedian, Actor	Star 80; That's Adequate	
November	12	Kazuki Ōmori	70	Japan	Director, Screenwriter	Godzilla vs. Biollante; Godzilla vs. King Ghidorah	
November	13	Constantin Codrescu	91	Romania	Actor	Michael the Brave; The Mill of Good Luck	
November	15	Veronica Hurst	91	UK	Actress	Laughter in Paradise; Angels One Five	
November	15	Krishna	79	India	Actor, Director, Producer	Thene Manasulu; Gudachari 116	
November	15	Gudrun Parker	102	Canada	Director, Screenwriter, Producer	The Stratford Adventure; Royal Journey	
November	16	Nicki Aycox	47	US	Actress	Jeepers Creepers 2; Perfect Stranger	
November	16	Robert Clary	96	France	Actor, Singer	The Hindenburg; Ten Tall Men	
November	18	Jean Lapointe	86	Canada	Comedian, Actor, Singer	Orders; The Last Tunnel	
November	19	Nico Fidenco	89	Italy	Composer	John the Bastard; Taste of Killing	
November	19	Jason David Frank	49	US	Actor	Mighty Morphin Power Rangers; Turbo	
November	20	Gray Frederickson	85	US	Producer	Apocalypse Now; The Outsiders	
November	20	Mickey Kuhn	90	US	Actor	Gone with the Wind; Red River	
November	20	Jean-Marie Straub	89	France	Director, Screenwriter	Class Relations; Moses and Aaron	
November	25	Irene Cara	63	US	Actress, Singer, Songwriter	Fame; Sparkle	
November	26	Albert Pyun	69	US	Director, Screenwriter	Cyborg; Captain America	
November	26	Vikram Gokhale	77	India	Actor	Aaghaat; Anumati	
November	27	Gianfranco Piccioli	78	Italy	Producer	Beach House; Bix	
November	27	Yoichi Sai	73	Japan	Director, Screenwriter	Blood and Bones; Gohatto	
November	28	Cliff Emmich	85	US	Actor	Payday; Halloween II	
November	28	Clarence Gilyard	66	US	Actor	Top Gun; Die Hard	
November	29	Brad William Henke	56	US	Actor	Split; Fury	
November	30	Christiane Hörbiger	84	Austria	Actress	Schtonk!; The Major and the Bulls	
December	1	Mylène Demongeot	87	France	Actress	Fantômas; Bonjour Tristesse	
December	1	Julia Reichert	76	US	Documentarian	American Factory; A Lion in the House	
December	2	Louis Negin	93	Canada	Actor	Rabid; The Saddest Music in the World	
December	2	Al Strobel	83	US	Actor	Shadow Play; Twin Peaks: Fire Walk with Me	
December	3	Gina Romand	84	Cuba	Actress	I Am Very Macho; Immediate Delivery	
December	4	June Blair	89	US	Actress	Hell Bound; Island of Lost Women	
December	4	Bob McGrath	90	US	Actor, Singer	Follow That Bird; The Adventures of Elmo in Grouchland	
December	5	Kirstie Alley	71	US	Actress	Star Trek II: The Wrath of Khan; Look Who's Talking	
December	5	Terrence O'Hara	76	US	Actor	Naked Vengeance; Something Short of Paradise	
December	6	Miha Baloh	94	Slovenia	Actor	Battle of Neretva; Among Vultures	
December	6	Andrée Damant	93	France	Actress	Amélie; Belle and Sebastian	
December	7	Jacques Ciron	94	France	Actor	Frantic; The Unbearable Lightness of Being	
December	7	Jan Nowicki	83	Poland	Actor	The Hourglass Sanatorium; The Third Part of the Night	
December	7	Helen Slayton-Hughes	92	US	Actress	Good Night, and Good Luck; Moxie	
December	8	Albert Brenner	96	US	Production Designer, Art Director	Bullitt; Pretty Woman	
December	8	Richard Miller	80	US	Visual Effects Artist	Star Trek: First Contact; The Mask	
December	8	Yoshishige Yoshida	89	Japan	Director, Screenwriter	Akitsu Springs; Eros + Massacre	
December	9	Pedro Miguel Arce	46	Nicaragua	Actor	Land of the Dead; Polar	
December	9	Ruth Madoc	79	UK	Actress, Singer	Fiddler on the Roof; Very Annie Mary	
December	10	Soňa Valentová	76	Slovakia	Actress	Witchhammer; The Feather Fairy	
December	11	Angelo Badalamenti	85	US	Composer	Blue Velvet; Mulholland Drive	
December	11	Neal Jimenez	62	US	Screenwriter	River's Edge; The Waterdance	
December	12	Stuart Margolin	82	US	Actor	The Stone Killer; Death Wish	
December	13	Stephen "tWitch" Boss	40	US	Actor	Step Up; Magic Mike XXL	
December	14	Christopher Tucker	81	UK	Makeup Artist	The Elephant Man; The Meaning of Life	
December	15	James J. Murakami	91	US	Production Designer, Art Director	Changeling; True Romance	
December	15	Michael Reed	93	Canada	Cinematographer	On Her Majesty's Secret Service; The Gorgon	
December	16	Doreen Brownstone	100	Canada	Actress	The Stone Angel; High Life	
December	16	Hans Peter Hallwachs	84	Germany	Actor	Degree of Murder; Slap in the Face	
December	17	Mike Hodges	90	UK	Director, Screenwriter	Get Carter; Flash Gordon	
December	18	Lando Buzzanca	87	Italy	Actor	Divorce Italian Style; Seduced and Abandoned	
December	18	Daniela Giordano	76	Italy	Actress	I See Naked; Find a Place to Die	
December	18	Maggie Thrett	76	US	Actress, Singer	Out of Sight; The Devil's Brigade	
December	19	Sonya Eddy	55	US	Actress	Coach Carter; Barbershop	
December	20	Quinn Redeker	86	US	Actor, Screenwriter	Ordinary People; The Deer Hunter	
December	21	Tony Barry	81	Australia	Actor	Australia; Mystery Road	
December	21	Diane McBain	81	US	Actress	Spinout; The Broken Hearts Club	
December	22	Ronan Vibert	58	UK	Actor	The Pianist; Saving Mr. Banks	
December	23	Stephen Greif	78	UK	Actor	Nicholas and Alexandra; Casanova	
December	24	John Bird	86	UK	Actor	Jabberwocky; The Seven-Per-Cent Solution	
December	24	Edie Landau	95	US	Producer	Hopscotch; The Chosen	
December	26	Blasco Giurato	81	Italy	Cinematographer	Cinema Paradiso; A Pure Formality	
December	26	Si Litvinoff	93	US	Producer	A Clockwork Orange; Walkabout	
December	26	Christian Roberts	78	UK	Actor	To Sir, with Love; The Last Valley	
December	29	Eduard Artemyev	85	Russia	Composer	Solaris; Burnt by the Sun	
December	29	Ruggero Deodato	83	Italy	Director, Screenwriter	Cannibal Holocaust; Cut and Run	
December	31	Bert-Åke Varg	90	Sweden	Actor	Exponerad; Kärlekens språk	

== Film debuts ==
- Dexter Sol Ansell – Christmas on Mistletoe Farm
- Trinity Jo-Li Bliss – Avatar: The Way of Water
- Andrew Barth Feldman – White Noise
- Chloe Fineman – Home Team
- Caleb Hearon – Jurassic World Dominion
- Maitreyi Ramakrishnan – Turning Red
- Hunter Schafer – Belle
- Mallory Wanecque – The Worst Ones
