= Giuseppe Rotunno =

Italian cinematographer (1923–2021)

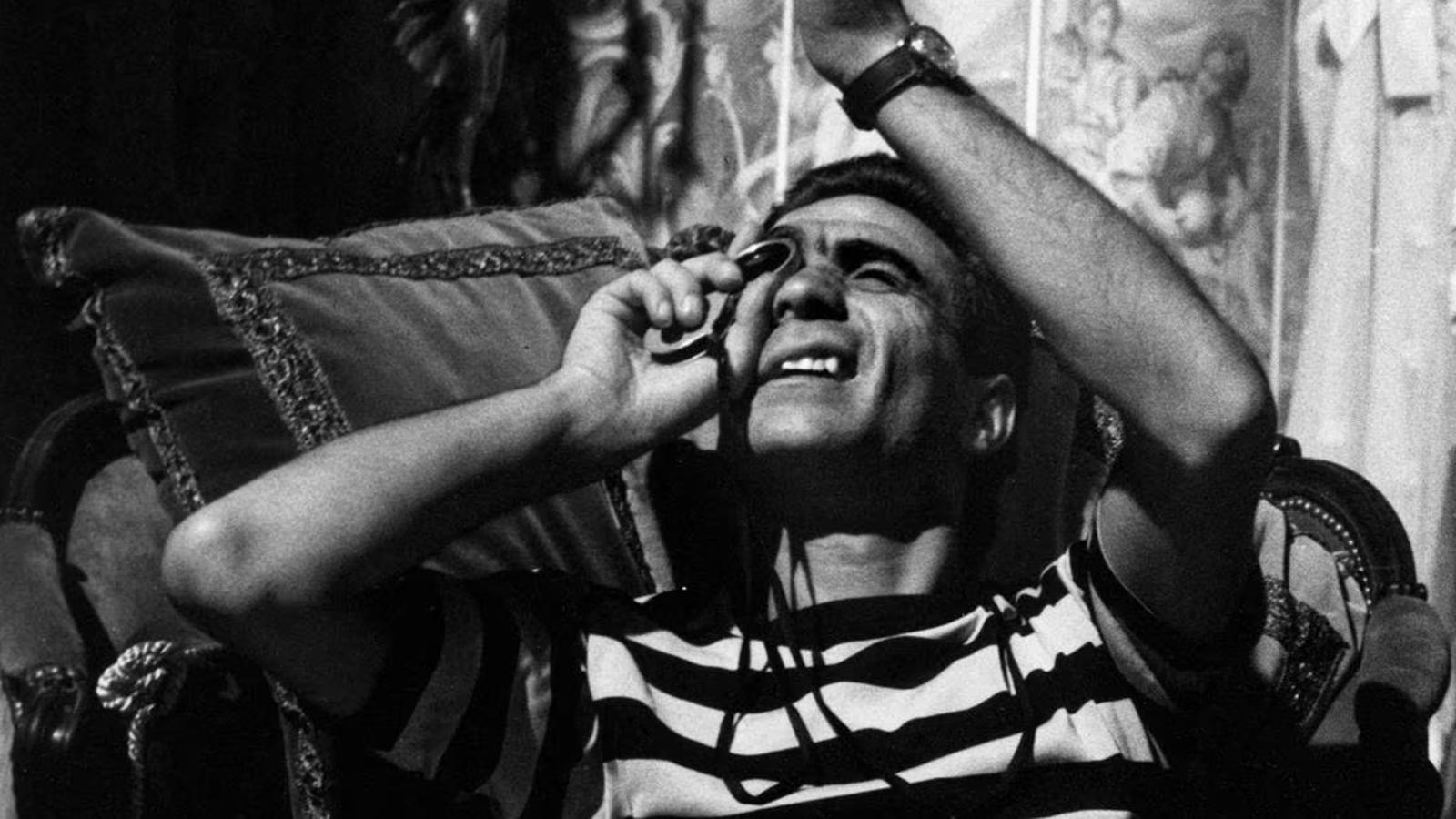
- Giuseppe Rotunno
- Born: Giuseppe Rotunno; 19 March 1923; Rome, Italy
- Died: 7 February 2021 (aged 97); Rome, Italy
- Other name: Peppino Rotunno
- Years active: 1943–1997

Giuseppe Rotunno (19 March 1923 – 7 February 2021) was an Italian cinematographer.

== Career ==
Sometimes credited as Peppino Rotunno, he contributed to 77 film productions over the course of his career. Rotunno was director of photography on eight films by Federico Fellini. He collaborated with several other celebrated Italian directors, including Vittorio De Sica, Pier Paolo Pasolini, Mario Monicelli, and Luchino Visconti.

Rotunno also served as the director of photography for Julia and Julia (1987), the first feature shot using high definition television taping technique and then transferred to 35 mm film.

He was nominated for the Academy Award for Best Cinematography for All That Jazz and won seven Silver Ribbon Awards.

Rotunno was the first non-American member admitted to the American Society of Cinematographers in 1966.

== Death and legacy ==
Rotunno died on 7 February 2021, at the age of 97.

Mark Lager, on Senses of Cinema, praised Giuseppe Rotunno's cinematography as "especially attuned to colour, composition, and perspective", particularly in Luchino Visconti's The Leopard and Federico Fellini's Amarcord, writing "Rotunno's cinematography in Amarcord is nostalgic as it presents the carnivalesque citizens and their daily lives during the four seasons in Fellini's reimagined seaside village of Rimini. His cinematography in The Leopard is elegant and panoramic as it surveys the rituals of the Sicilian nobility, centred upon Don Fabrizio Corbera, Prince of Salina."

== Filmography ==
=== Feature film ===
Year	Title	Director	Notes
1955	Scandal in Sorrento	Dino Risi	
1955	Cristo non si è fermato a Eboli	Michele Gandin	
1956	Tosca	Carmine Gallone	
1956	The Monte Carlo Story	Samuel A. Taylor	
1957	White Nights	Luchino Visconti	
1958	The Love Specialist	Luigi Zampa	
1958	Anna of Brooklyn	Reginald Denham; Carlo Lastricati	
1958	The Naked Maja	Henry Koster	
1959	Policarpo	Mario Soldati	
1959	The Great War	Mario Monicelli	With Roberto Gerardi
1959	On the Beach	Stanley Kramer	
1960	Five Branded Women	Martin Ritt	
1960	The Angel Wore Red	Nunnally Johnson	
1960	Rocco and His Brothers	Luchino Visconti	
1961	Ghosts of Rome	Antonio Pietrangeli	
1961	The Best of Enemies	Guy Hamilton	
1962	Family Diary	Valerio Zurlini	
1963	The Leopard	Luchino Visconti	
1963	The Organizer	Mario Monicelli	
1963	Yesterday, Today and Tomorrow	Vittorio De Sica	
1966	The Bible: In the Beginning...	John Huston	
1967	The Witches	Mauro Bolognini; Vittorio De Sica; Pier Paolo Pasolini; Franco Rossi; Luchino Visconti	
1967	The Stranger	Luchino Visconti	
1968	Anzio	Edward Dmytryk	
1968	Candy	Christian Marquand	
1969	Fellini Satyricon	Federico Fellini	
1969	The Secret of Santa Vittoria	Stanley Kramer	
1970	Sunflower	Vittorio De Sica	
1970	Splendori e miserie di Madame Royale	Vittorio Caprioli	
1971	Carnal Knowledge	Mike Nichols	
1972	Roma	Federico Fellini	
1972	Man of La Mancha	Arthur Hiller	
1973	Love and Anarchy	Lina Wertmüller	
1973	Amarcord	Federico Fellini	
1974	All Screwed Up	Lina Wertmüller	
1974	The Beast	Sergio Corbucci	
1974	Erotomania	Marco Vicario	
1975	The Divine Nymph	Giuseppe Patroni Griffi	
1975	Fellini's Casanova	Federico Fellini	
1976	Stormtroopers	Salvatore Samperi	
1977	Ecco noi per esempio	Sergio Corbucci	
1978	A Night Full of Rain	Lina Wertmüller	
1978	China 9, Liberty 37	Monte Hellman	
1978	Orchestra Rehearsal	Federico Fellini	
1979	All That Jazz	Bob Fosse	
1980	City of Women	Federico Fellini	
1980	Popeye	Robert Altman	
1981	Rollover	Alan J. Pakula	With Guglielmo Garroni (Credited as William Garroni)
1982	My Darling, My Dearest	Sergio Corbucci	
1982	Five Days One Summer	Fred Zinnemann	
1983	And the Ship Sails On	Federico Fellini	
1984	Desiderio	Anna Maria Tatò	
1984	American Dreamer	Rick Rosenthal	With Jan de Bont
1984	Nothing Left to Do But Cry	Roberto Benigni; Massimo Troisi	
1985	The Assisi Underground	Alexander Ramati	
1985	Red Sonja	Richard Fleischer	
1985	Orfeo	Claude Goretta	
1987	Hotel Colonial	Cinzia TH Torrini	
1987	Julia and Julia	Peter Del Monte	
1987	Rent-a-Cop	Jerry London	
1988	Haunted Summer	Ivan Passer	
1988	The Adventures of Baron Munchausen	Terry Gilliam	
1989	Rebus	Massimo Guglielmi	
1990	The Bachelor	Roberto Faenza	
1991	Regarding Henry	Mike Nichols	
1992	Once Upon a Crime	Eugene Levy	
1994	Wolf	Mike Nichols	
1995	The Night and the Moment	Anna Maria Tatò	
1995	Sabrina	Sydney Pollack	
1996	The Stendhal Syndrome	Dario Argento	
1997	Marcello Mastroianni: I Remember	Anna Maria Tatò	Documentary film

=== Television ===
TV movies

Year	Title	Director	Notes
1975	E il Casanova di Fellini?	Gianfranco Angelucci; Liliana Betti	Documentary film
1983	The Scarlet and the Black	Jerry London	

TV series

Year	Title	Director	Notes
1976	Origins of the Mafia	Enzo Muzii	Miniseries

== Awards and nominations ==
Year	Award	Nomination	Title	Result
1979	Academy Awards	Best Cinematography	All That Jazz	Nominated
1978	BAFTA Awards	Best Cinematography	Fellini's Casanova	Nominated
1979	BAFTA Awards	Best Cinematography	All That Jazz	Won
1966	David di Donatello	Best Cinematography	The Bible: In the Beginning...	Won
1990	David di Donatello	Best Cinematography	The Bachelor	Won
1957	Silver Ribbon	Best Cinematography	The Monte Carlo Story	Nominated
1958	Silver Ribbon	Best Cinematography	White Nights	Nominated
1959	Silver Ribbon	Best Cinematography	The Naked Maja	Nominated
1960	Silver Ribbon	Best Cinematography	Policarpo	Nominated
1960	Silver Ribbon	Best Cinematography	The Great War	Nominated
1961	Silver Ribbon	Best Cinematography	Rocco and His Brothers	Won
1962	Silver Ribbon	Best Cinematography	Ghosts of Rome	Nominated
1963	Silver Ribbon	Best Cinematography	Family Diary	Won
1963	Silver Ribbon	Best Cinematography	Yesterday, Today and Tomorrow	Nominated
1963	Silver Ribbon	Best Cinematography	The Leopard	Won
1966	Silver Ribbon	Best Cinematography	The Bible: In the Beginning...	Nominated
1969	Silver Ribbon	Best Cinematography	Fellini Satyricon	Won
1974	Silver Ribbon	Best Cinematography	Amarcord	Nominated
1975	Silver Ribbon	Best Cinematography	The Divine Nymph	Nominated
1976	Silver Ribbon	Best Cinematography	Fellini's Casanova	Won
1980	Silver Ribbon	Best Cinematography	City of Women	Won
1983	Silver Ribbon	Best Cinematography	And the Ship Sails On	Won
1988	Silver Ribbon	Best Cinematography	Julia and Julia	Nominated
1990	Silver Ribbon	Best Cinematography	The Adventures of Baron Munchausen	Won
1990	Silver Ribbon	Best Cinematography	The Bachelor	Nominated
