= Walk the Talk =

Walk the Talk may refer to:

- Walk the Talk EP, a 2012 EP by William Beckett
- Walk the Talk (film), a 2001 Australian film
