= The 13th Floor (1988 film) =

- Directed by: Chris Roache
- Written by: Chris Roache
- Produced by: David Hannay; Charles Hannah
- Starring: Miranda Otto; Lisa Hensley
- Cinematography: Stephen Prime
- Edited by: Peter McBain
- Music by: Mick Coleman
- Release date: 1988
- Running time: 94 minutes
- Country: Australia
- Language: English
- Budget: AU $600,000 (est.)

The 13th Floor is a 1988 Ozploitation horror film directed by Chris Roache and starring Miranda Otto and Lisa Hensley.

== Plot ==
A car pulls up to a building under construction, and a man instructs his daughter, Heather, to stay in the car while he attends to some business. The girl sneaks inside and witnesses her father kill a man. The man's young son is electrocuted, turning him into a ghost.

Twelve years later, Heather Thompson is twenty years old and her father is running for re-election. Heather has some incriminating documentation that she could use to expose her father. She decides to squat, with her friend Rebecca on the abandoned thirteenth floor of the building from twelve years earlier. Meanwhile, Mr. Thompson hires a thug, Brenner, to tail Heather, in order to retrieve the documents. The girls' friend, Nick, joins them and overnight, Heather is awakened by crackling coming from an electrical closet and hides the documents there.

The girls run into John Burke, a social worker stationed in the building. Heather meets him for a drink and asks him to keep their squatting a secret. When Burke drops Heather back, the thug, Brenner, sees her and gives chase. She escapes, before running into the security officer, whose gun she steals. She returns to the thirteenth floor, where Brenner is lying in wait. He disarms Heather and demands she hand over the files, but is startled by the mysterious electricity in the closet. He tries to flee, but falls down the elevator shaft.

After Burke illegally sets Heather up for social security, she takes him to the thirteenth floor, where they have sex. While Heather is asleep, Rebecca injects heroin. The ghost of the boy from the opening scene tries to alert Heather, but she does not wake, and Rebecca overdoses. Heather discovers her body in the bathroom.

Burke is accosted by Mr. Thompson's thugs. They torture him and force him to call Heather to tell her to give up the documents, before killing him. They then invade the thirteenth floor, and trap Heather and Nick in the elevator. The pair escape and head to the security guard’s apartment, where they steal his gun and find him murdered. The thugs drown Nick in a swimming pool, but Heather survives.

Heather wakes up in a hospital, being injected with heroin. Heather steals the doctor's keys, escapes and hitchhikes back to the building. She hears electricity crackling and sees the ghost, who wants justice, holding the documents. Heather calls her father and lures him to the building, with the promise of the files, where the ghost grabs him. Heather, who has acquired electrical powers, zaps him and he falls to his death down the elevator shaft.

== Cast ==
- Miranda Otto as Rebecca
- Lisa Hensley as Heather Thompson
  - Kylie Clare as 8-year-old Heather
- Tony Blackett as Robert Thompson
- Vic Rooney as Brenner
- Paul Hunt as Nick
- Tim McKenzie as John Burke
- Nik Forster as Tom Poulsen
- Matthew Nicholls as Tom Poulsen's son
- Jeff Truman as Bert
- Georgie Parker as Maid
- Michael Caton as Dr. Fletcher

== Production ==
The film was directed by Chris Roache, who had just graduated from film school. He never directed anything else, but went on to write for numerous Australian TV shows, including Heartbreak High and Home and Away.

The film was produced by David Hannay Productions.

== Filming locations ==
The film was shot in Sydney, where the harbour and the Sydney Harbour Bridge are visible in the date scene and the closing scene.

== Reception ==
Film critic David Stratton of At the Movies wrote for Variety: "The 13th Floor is a creaky ghost story gone direct to video in Oz. It’s the weakest in a quartet of pics assembled by Premiere Film Marketing and Medusa Communications... Pic is light on thrills, since the ghost obviously is on the heroine’s side. The villains, including the building’s macho caretaker and another hitman, aren’t very threatening... Hensley has little to do except look nervous. Technically, the film is fine except for the great banks of light in the supposedly deserted office. Newcomer Chris Roache, who wrote and directed, misses an opportunity here.

Peter Walkden of Walkden Entertainment said: "Overall, this is a good choice if you’re looking for a horror film with a minor ghost element. As an Ozploitation film, it presents extreme violence right from the opening scene, and as the film progresses, the violent kills are often surprising and unexpected. The performances by Kylie Clare and Tim McKenzie are enjoyable and engaging. However, if you’re specifically seeking a ghost story, that aspect takes time to develop, and other subplots are introduced that feel forced. Nonetheless, the film’s finale is quite satisfying and wraps up nicely, providing a fulfilling experience as a classic Australian film."

== See also ==
- Cinema of Australia
