= Walk the Talk (film) =

2000 film

- U.S. DVD cover
- Directed by: Shirley Barrett
- Written by: Shirley Barrett
- Produced by: Jan Chapman
- Starring: Salvatore Coco; Sacha Horler; Nikki Bennett
- Cinematography: Mandy Walker
- Edited by: Denise Haratzis
- Music by: Todd Hunter; Mark O'Connor
- Distributed by: 20th Century Fox
- Release dates: September 9, 2000 (Toronto); March 15, 2001 (Australia)
- Running time: 95 minutes
- Country: Australia
- Language: English
- Budget: A$5 million
- Box office: A$75,910 (Australia)

Walk the Talk is a 2000 Australian black comedy film written and directed by Shirley Barrett and starring Salvatore Coco, Sacha Horler, and Nikki Bennett. Having been impressed by Barrett's debut film Love Serenade, David Geffen at DreamWorks Pictures agreed to finance the film. However, DreamWorks later found itself unable to market the film and feared that the film's disturbing content would not fit well in its television output deals, ultimately releasing it on DVD sometime in 2003. The film premiered at the Toronto International Film Festival on September 9, 2000, and was given a limited theatrical release in Sydney and Melbourne on March 15, 2001, by 20th Century Fox.

== Premise ==
After being mesmerized by fading club singer Nikki Raye, aspiring talent manager Joey Grassy attempts to revive her career by opening his own talent agency using his paraplegic girlfriend Bonita's insurance payout. When Nikki's wacky shenanigans drive away an interested record producer, Joey decides to go to extremes to save face and make her a household name.

== Cast ==
- Salvatore Coco as Joey Grassy
- Sacha Horler as Bonita
- Nikki Bennett as Nikki Raye
- Carter Edwards as Marty Raye
- Robert Coleby as Pastor Bob
- Skye Wansey as Barbara Jacobs-Alsop
- John Burgess as Rex Hanna
- Jon English as Phil Wehner
- Nicki Wendt as Linda Mundell
- David Franklin as Trevor Whitney
- Bille Brown as Barry
