= Shirley Barrett =

Australian film director (1961–2022)

- Born: 1961; Melbourne, Australia
- Died: 3 August 2022 (aged 61); Sydney, Australia
- Occupations: Film director, screenwriter, novelist
- Years active: 1988–2021
- Spouse: Chris Norris
- Children: 2

Shirley Barrett (1961 – 3 August 2022) was an Australian film director, screenwriter, and novelist. From 1981 to 1983, Barrett was a singer in the band Fruit Pastilles. After ending her time in the band, she became a film maker. Her first feature, Love Serenade, won the Caméra d'Or at the 1996 Cannes Film Festival. She wrote and directed two other feature films, Walk the Talk (2000) and South Solitary (2010).

Barrett's script for South Solitary was awarded multiple prizes, including the Queensland Premier's Prize and the West Australian Premier's Prize. Her first novel, Rush Oh! (2016), was shortlisted for the 2016 Indie Awards for Debut Fiction and the 2016 Nita May Dobbie Award, and long-listed for the 2016 Baileys Women's Prize for Fiction. Her second novel, The Bus on Thursday, was released in 2018.

== Early life and education ==
Barrett was born in Melbourne in 1961. In 1985, she moved to Sydney, where she studied screenwriting at the Australian Film, Television and Radio School (AFTRS). In 1988, during her final year at the AFTRS she made a short film entitled Cherith which won the Australian Film Institute Award for Best Short Fiction.

== Television ==
Barrett began her career in television “with production work on the Logies.” After meeting Verity Lambert, she was given the opportunity to direct for a television series The Boys From the Bush. She continued working in television during the 1990s and 2000s, directing episodes for various television series including Love My Way, Wild Boys, Offspring, and A Place to Call Home.

== Film ==
=== Love Serenade ===
Barrett's first feature Love Serenade (1996) was a film that explored, “how women can get completely the wrong idea about some men.” It was shot almost entirely on location in Robinvale, Victoria. The story concerns two young sisters who develop a fierce and competitive crush on their neighbour, a brooding and self-centred radio personality. The film humorously incorporates "small town constrictions with visual flights of fancy". The sisters are played by Miranda Otto and Rebecca Frith and George Shevtsov stars as the washed up deejay. The film was generally well-received, with Variety describing it as “one of the most striking, fully formed and assured debuts in years.” It won the Camera D'Or (Best First Feature) at Cannes film Festival 1996, and Barrett was awarded Best New Director at the Vallodolid International Film Festival in 1996.

=== Walk the Talk ===
Her second feature Walk the Talk (2000) was also inspired by the location in which the film is set. Walk the Talk in this case is set on the Gold Coast of Queensland. "Shirley had met Carter Edwards, a variety circuit veteran who appears in the film as Marty". This encounter "came in handy when Walk the Talk started to develop as a script". The film is "about dreamers and schemers, isolation and redemption, populated with iconic places and people", and stars Salvatore Coco as Joey, a desperately ambitious young man and Sacha Horler as his girlfriend Bonita. After winning a large settlement from an accident that leaves Bonita paraplegic, Joey starts a talent agency hoping to "make his mark on the world". Joey encounters Nikki Raye (Nikki Bennett), “a variety club singer” and decides to represent her as an agent in attempts to thrust her, and himself into the limelight. The characters that Shirley Barrett created in Walk the Talk are "relegated to the fringes of a hero's journey". The comedic effect of the film emerges through the "desperation of these people living on the margins". Variety described it as "a bitingly funny, hard-hitting and yet compassionate examination of a bunch of losers on the fringe of showbiz."

=== South Solitary ===
Barrett's third feature South Solitary (2010) is "another tale of outcasts". The film stars Miranda Otto (who starred in Love Serenade) as Meredith a lonely young woman. This time around, she situates the actress "on an island in 1927, tending to a lighthouse so isolated that the only way of communicating with the mainland is via carrier pigeon". In the film, Meredith and “her uncle George (Barry Otto), a lighthouse keeper who has come to replace the previous one.” They arrive on the desolate island and meet the island's inhabitants, a family consisting of the mother Alma (Essie Davis), her husband Stanley (Rohan Nichol), and their daughter Nettie (Annie Martin). Similar to her character's romantic perils in Love Serenade, "Meredith is desperate for some kind of connection with men", which drives her to have an affair with Stanley. As the film continues, "the population of the island dwindles to two", leaving Meredith in the company of Fleet (Marton Csokas), "a returned First World War soldier recovering form shell shock". Meredith is searching and longing for companionship while Fleet "shies away from the confusion and misunderstandings of human contact". Despite this tension between the characters, they develop affections for one another.

== Novels ==
=== Rush Oh! ===
Barrett's first novel Rush Oh! (2015) is set in Eden, New South Wales:in 1908. It tells the story of a family of whalers and their unusual relationship with a pod of killer whales. It is based on a true story.

=== The Bus on Thursday ===
Barrett's second novel The Bus on Thursday (2018) tells the story of a young woman recently recovering from breast cancer who takes a job as teacher in a tiny school in a remote country town, where she finds herself set upon by demons.

== Personal life ==
Barrett was married to Chris Norris. They had two daughters. She lived in Sydney. In March 2022, she wrote about her battle with terminal cancer. She died in Sydney on 3 August 2022, aged 61.

== Filmography ==
=== As writer ===
- 1988 — Cherith (short)
- 1996 — Love Serenade (screenplay)
- 2000 — Walk the Talk
- 2010 — South Solitary

=== As director ===
- 1988 — Cherith
- 1991 — Boys from the Bush (4 episodes)
- 1992–1993 — A Country Practice
- 1994 — Heartbreak High (7 episodes)
- 1995 — Police Rescue (1 episode)
- 1996 — Love Serenade
- 2000 — Walk the Talk
- 2006–2007 — Love My Way (5 episodes)
- 2010 — South Solitary
- 2011 — Packed to the Rafters (2 episodes)
- 2010–2013 — Offspring (6 episodes)
- 2011 — Wild Boys (2 episodes)
- 2012 — House Husbands (2 episodes)
- 2013 — Mr & Mrs Murder (2 episodes)
- 2014 — Love Child (2 episodes)
- 2015 — Winter (2 episodes)
- 2015 — A Place to Call Home (2 episodes)
- 2016 — A Place to Call Home (4 episodes)
- 2017 — Offspring (2 episodes)
- 2021 — Five Bedrooms (6 episodes)

== Other writings ==
- 2015 — Rush Oh! (novel)
- 2018 — The Bus On Thursday (novel)

== Awards ==
=== Won ===
- Australian Film Institute 1988:
  - AFI Award for Best Short Fiction Film Cherith
- Cannes Film Festival 1996:
  - Camera D'Or for Love Serenade
- Valladolid International Film Festival 1996:
  - Best New Director for Love Serenade
- Queensland Premier Prize 2010:
  - Script for South Solitary
- West Australian Premier's Literary Prize 2010:
  - Script for South Solitary
- West Australian Premiers Prize 2010:
  - Script for South Solitary

=== Nominated ===
- Australian Film Institute 2006:
  - AFI Award for Best Direction in Television Love My Way

==== Shortlisted ====
- 2016 Indie Awards for Debut Fiction Rush Oh!
- 2016 Nita May Dobbie Literary Award Rush Oh!

==== Long-listed ====
- 2016 Baileys Women's Prize for Fiction Rush Oh!
