= E il Casanova di Fellini? =

1975 film by Liliana Betti

- Directed by: Gianfranco Angelucci; Liliana Betti
- Starring: Olimpia Carlisi; Federico Fellini
- Cinematography: Giuseppe Rotunno
- Edited by: Maurizio Tedesco
- Music by: Nino Rota
- Distributed by: Rai Cinema
- Release date: 1975
- Running time: 72 minutes
- Country: Italy
- Language: Italian

E il Casanova di Fellini? is an Italian documentary directed by Gianfranco Angelucci and Liliane Betti released in 1975.

== Plot ==
Five famous actors present what Fellini's Casanova, which remains to be filmed, would be if they are chosen for the leading part.

== Production ==
This “film on the film”, which is in a way the reverse of a making of, was actually shot to make the producer wait, because the gestation of the film was difficult. Fellini made a commitment to Dino De Laurentiis to make a "Casanova", but reading Casanova's memoirs annoyed him, because he found the character particularly full of himself and his boring story, and he couldn't seem to start. But Gianfranco Angelucci's film also served as a cast for Fellini's main movie.

== Cast ==
- Olimpia Carlisi
- Piero Chiara
- Alain Cuny
- Federico Fellini
- Vittorio Gassman
- Roberto Gervaso
- Tonino Guerra
- Luigi Latini De Marchi
- Marcello Mastroianni
- Alberto Sordi
- Ugo Tognazzi
