= Miranda Otto =

Australian actress (born 1967)

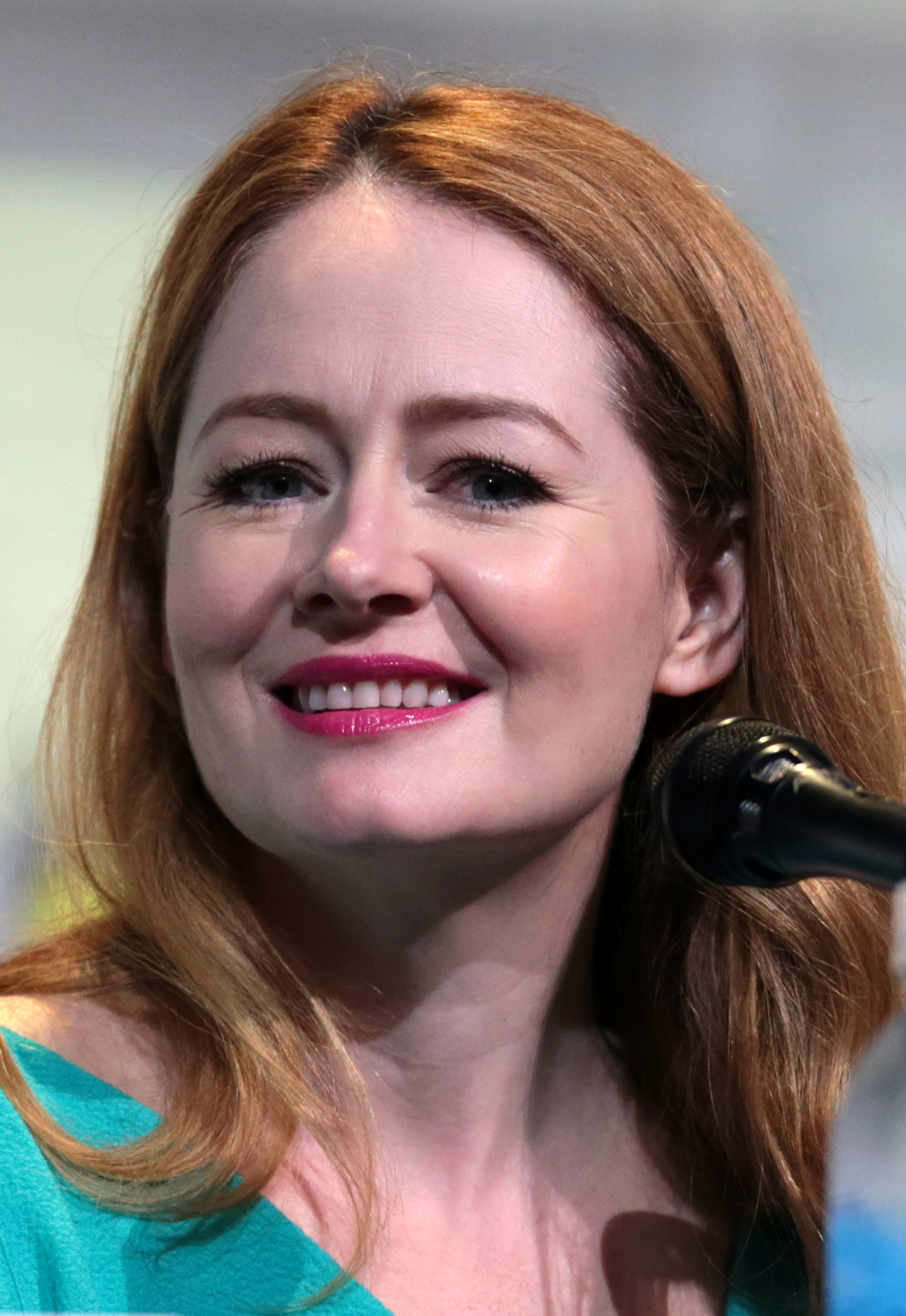
- Otto at the 2016 San Diego Comic-Con
- Born: 16 December 1967 (age 58); Brisbane, Queensland, Australia
- Education: National Institute of Dramatic Art (BFA)
- Occupation: Actress
- Years active: 1985–present
- Known for: Éowyn in The Lord of the Rings
- Spouse: Peter O'Brien (m. 2003)
- Children: 1
- Parent: Barry Otto (father)
- Relatives: Gracie Otto (half-sister)

Miranda Otto (born 16 December 1967) is an Australian actress. After a decade of critically acclaimed roles in Australian films, Otto gained attention in Hollywood during the 1990s after appearing in supporting roles in the films The Thin Red Line and What Lies Beneath. She rose to fame in the early 2000s for playing Éowyn in Peter Jackson's The Lord of the Rings film series, based on the classic fantasy novel of the same name by English author J. R. R. Tolkien. She has since starred in the films War of the Worlds (2005), I, Frankenstein (2013), Annabelle: Creation (2017), and Talk to Me (2022), and the television series Homeland (2015), 24: Legacy (2017), and Chilling Adventures of Sabrina (2018).

Otto is the daughter of actors Barry and Lindsay Otto and the paternal half-sister of actress Gracie Otto. Otto began her acting career in 1986 at age 18 and appeared in a variety of independent and major studio films in Australia. She made her major film debut in Emma's War in 1987 in which she played a teenager who moves to Australia's bush country during World War II.

== Early life ==
Otto was born on 16 December 1967 in Brisbane and was raised there and in Newcastle. She briefly lived in Hong Kong following her parents' divorce at age six. She spent weekends and holidays with her father in Sydney and developed an interest in acting through him. Research revealed that she is biologically of Scottish and Irish ancestry. Her surname comes from her father's stepfather, a butcher of German descent.

During her childhood, Otto and her friends wrote scripts and designed costumes and flyers in their spare time. She appeared in several plays at the Nimrod Theatre, which attracted the attention of casting director Faith Martin. Subsequently, Otto received a role in the 1986 World War II drama Emma's War.

She had wanted to be a ballerina but was forced to abandon that goal due to moderate scoliosis. Otto graduated from the National Institute of Dramatic Art in Sydney in 1990. Prior to graduation, she appeared in minor film roles including Initiation (1987) and The 13th Floor (1988).

== Career ==
=== Early career ===
Otto's first post-graduation film role in 1991, as Nell Tiscowitz in The Girl Who Came Late, was her breakthrough role which brought her to the attention of the Australian film industry and the general public. In the film, directed by Kathy Mueller, she starred as a young woman who could communicate with horses. Her appearance garnered Otto her first Australian Film Institute nomination for the best actress award the following year.

Otto's next role was in The Last Days of Chez Nous (1991), which portrayed the complex relationships between the members of an Australian family. The film earned Otto her second Australian Film Institute nomination, this time for the best supporting actress award.

In 1993, Otto co-starred with Noah Taylor in the sexually provocative comedy film The Nostradamus Kid, which was based on the memories of author Bob Ellis during the 1960s. Otto was drawn to the film because she was "fascinated by the period and the people who came out of it". A small role in the independent film Sex Is a Four Letter Word followed in 1995.

In 1995, she began to doubt her career choice as she failed to get the parts for which she auditioned. She retreated to her home in Newcastle for almost a year, during which she painted her mother's house. In 1996, director Shirley Barrett cast Otto as a shy waitress in the film Love Serenade. She played Dimity Hurley, a lonely young woman who competes with her older sister Vicki-Ann for the attention of a famous DJ from Brisbane. She starred in the 1997 films The Well and Doing Time for Patsy Cline. When Otto received the film script for The Well, she refused to read it, fearing that she would not get the part. Otto believed that she could not convincingly play the role of Katherine, who is supposed to be 18, as she was 30 at the time. The film, directed by Samantha Lang, starred Otto as a teenager involved in a claustrophobic relationship with a lonely older woman. The Well received mixed reviews; critic Paul Fisher wrote that Otto's performance was not "convincing" as she was "playing another repetitious character about whom little is revealed", while Louise Keller stated that Otto had delivered "her best screen performance yet." Otto earned her third Australian Film Institute nomination for the film. Later that year, she co-starred with Richard Roxburgh in the drama Doing Time for Patsy Cline. The low-budget Australian film required Otto to perform country music standards and also received mixed reviews from film critics.

Soon after the release of The Well and Doing Time for Patsy Cline, magazines and other media outlets were eager to profile the actress. In 1997, Otto began dating her Doing Time for Patsy Cline co-star Richard Roxburgh. Her involvement with Roxburgh made her a regular subject of Australian tabloid magazines and media at the time, a role to which she was unaccustomed.

Otto's next project was the romantic comedy Dead Letter Office (1998). The film was Otto's first with her father, Barry, who makes a brief appearance. In the Winter Dark, directed by James Bogle, followed later that year. Otto played Ronnie, a pregnant woman recently abandoned by her boyfriend. The film was a critical success in Australia, and Otto was nominated for her fourth Australian Film Institute Award. A small role in The Thin Red Line (1998) led to further film roles outside of Australia, such as in Italy, where she co-starred as Ruth in the low-budget Italian film La volpe a tre zampe ("The Three-legged Fox"), produced in 2001 and broadcast for the first time on Italian television in March 2009.

=== Hollywood ===
Otto's first Hollywood role was the suspense thriller What Lies Beneath in 2000. She played Mary Feur, a mysterious next-door neighbour.

In 2001, she was cast as a naturalist in the comedy Human Nature. Writer Charlie Kaufman, impressed by her audition two years earlier for his film Being John Malkovich, arranged for Otto to audition and meet with the film's director Michel Gondry. Critic Jeffrey M. Anderson criticised Otto's French accent and wrote that she "doesn't seem to mesh with what's going on around her".

Also in 2001, Otto appeared in the BBC adaptation of Anthony Trollope's The Way We Live Now, as a strong-willed American Southerner.

In 1999, Otto was cast as Éowyn in The Lord of the Rings film trilogy, after Uma Thurman turned down the role. Director Peter Jackson cast her immediately after viewing the audition video she had filmed in Australia. For the role, Otto spent six weeks learning stunt choreography and horse riding. Otto's character was introduced in the trilogy's second film The Lord of the Rings: The Two Towers in 2002 and appeared in the third film, The Lord of the Rings: The Return of the King, the following year. The Lord of the Rings trilogy was a critical and financial success, and the third film won the Academy Award for Best Picture in 2004. Otto's performance earned her an Academy of Science Fiction, Fantasy & Horror Films nomination for Best Supporting Actress.

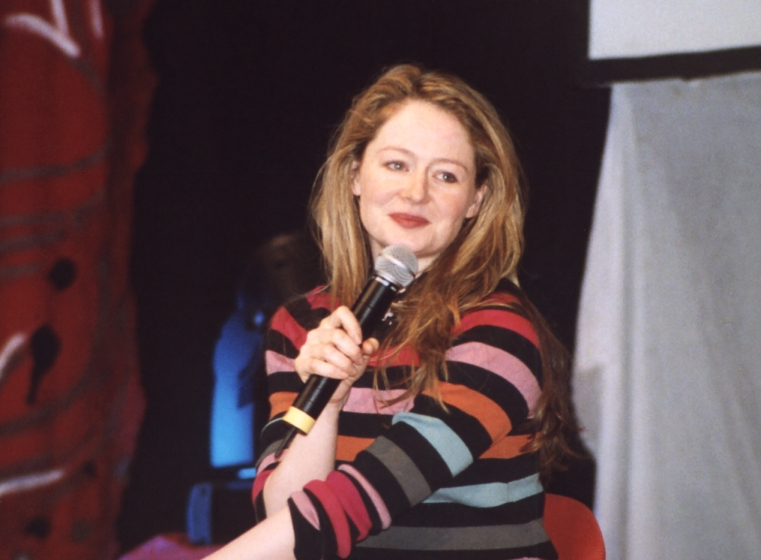
Otto at Ring*Con in Germany in 2006

Otto's next project was playing the lead in the Australian film Danny Deckchair (2003). She then took on the Australian television miniseries Through My Eyes: The Lindy Chamberlain Story (2004). The film is a drama that portrays the story of Lindy Chamberlain, who was wrongfully convicted in 1982 of killing her baby daughter, Azaria, in one of the country's most publicized murder trials. Otto was cast as Chamberlain, and her husband, Peter O'Brien, was cast as prosecutor Ian Barker. She was drawn to the role because it provided her with the "prospect of exploring an unconventional character." At the 2005 Logie Awards, Otto won Most Outstanding Actress in a Drama Series for her role.

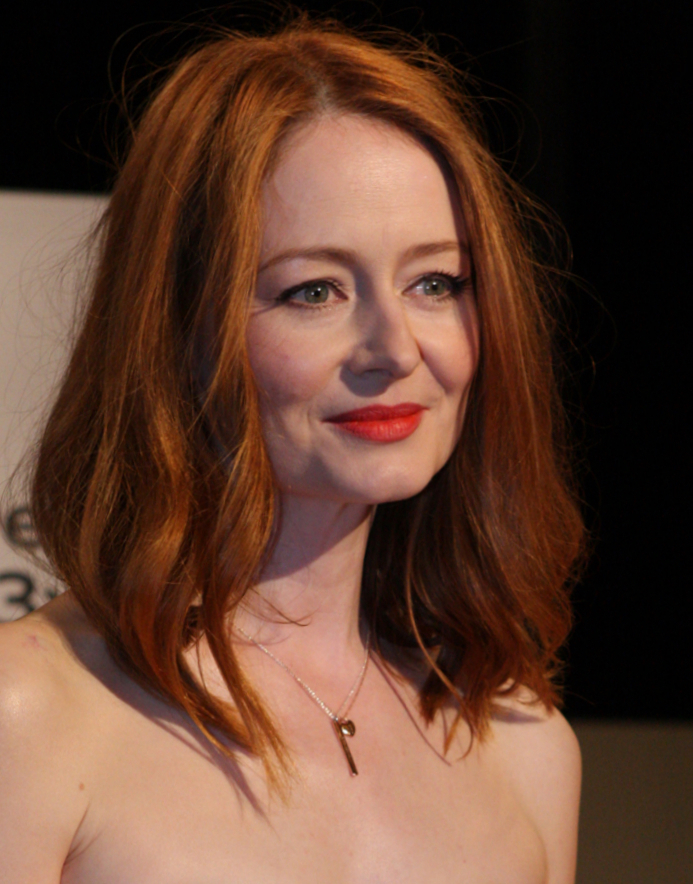
Otto at InStyle Women of Style Awards Red Carpet 2012.

Director Steven Spielberg, impressed by Otto's performance in The Lord of the Rings, called her to ask if she would play opposite Tom Cruise in the big-budget science fiction film War of the Worlds (2005). Otto, pregnant at the time, believed she would have to turn down the role, but the script was reworked to accommodate her. After giving birth to her daughter, she took a rest from films to concentrate on motherhood and theatre roles in Australia.

In 2007, Otto starred as Cricket Stewart, the wife of a successful director, in the television miniseries The Starter Wife. That same year, she was cast in the American television series Cashmere Mafia. In the series she plays Juliet Draper, a successful female executive who must rely on her friends to juggle the demands of a career and family in New York City. Otto chose to star in the series because "American television at the moment is so interesting and, particularly, the characters for women are so fantastic" and she "liked the idea of having a character over a long period of time and developing it." The series was cancelled in May 2008.

In 2013, Otto played the role of American poet Elizabeth Bishop opposite Glória Pires in Brazilian director Bruno Barreto’s Reaching for the Moon.

In 2015, Otto played Alison Carr, the CIA's Berlin station chief, in the fifth season of the American spy thriller series Homeland.

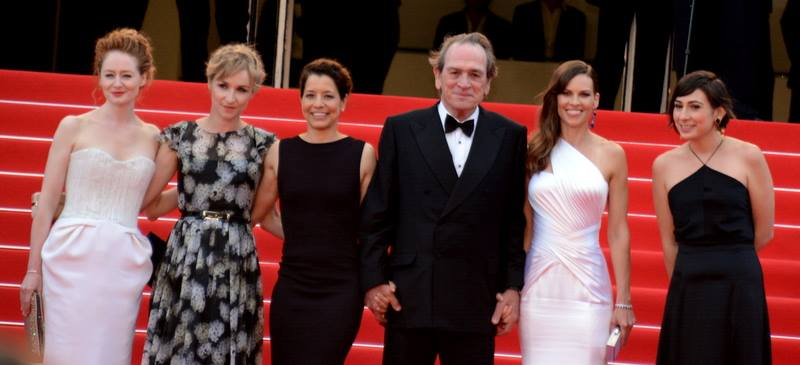
Otto (far left) at Cannes Film Festival 2014

Otto starred opposite Stephanie Sigman and Anthony LaPaglia in the horror prequel Annabelle: Creation, directed by David F. Sandberg. The film was released on 12 August 2017. She portrayed Zelda Spellman in Netflix's Chilling Adventures of Sabrina (2018–2020).

On 31 May 2020, Otto joined Josh Gad's YouTube series Reunited Apart, which reunites the cast of popular films through video-conferencing and promotes donations to non-profit charities, with her fellow Lord of the Rings cast and crew members.

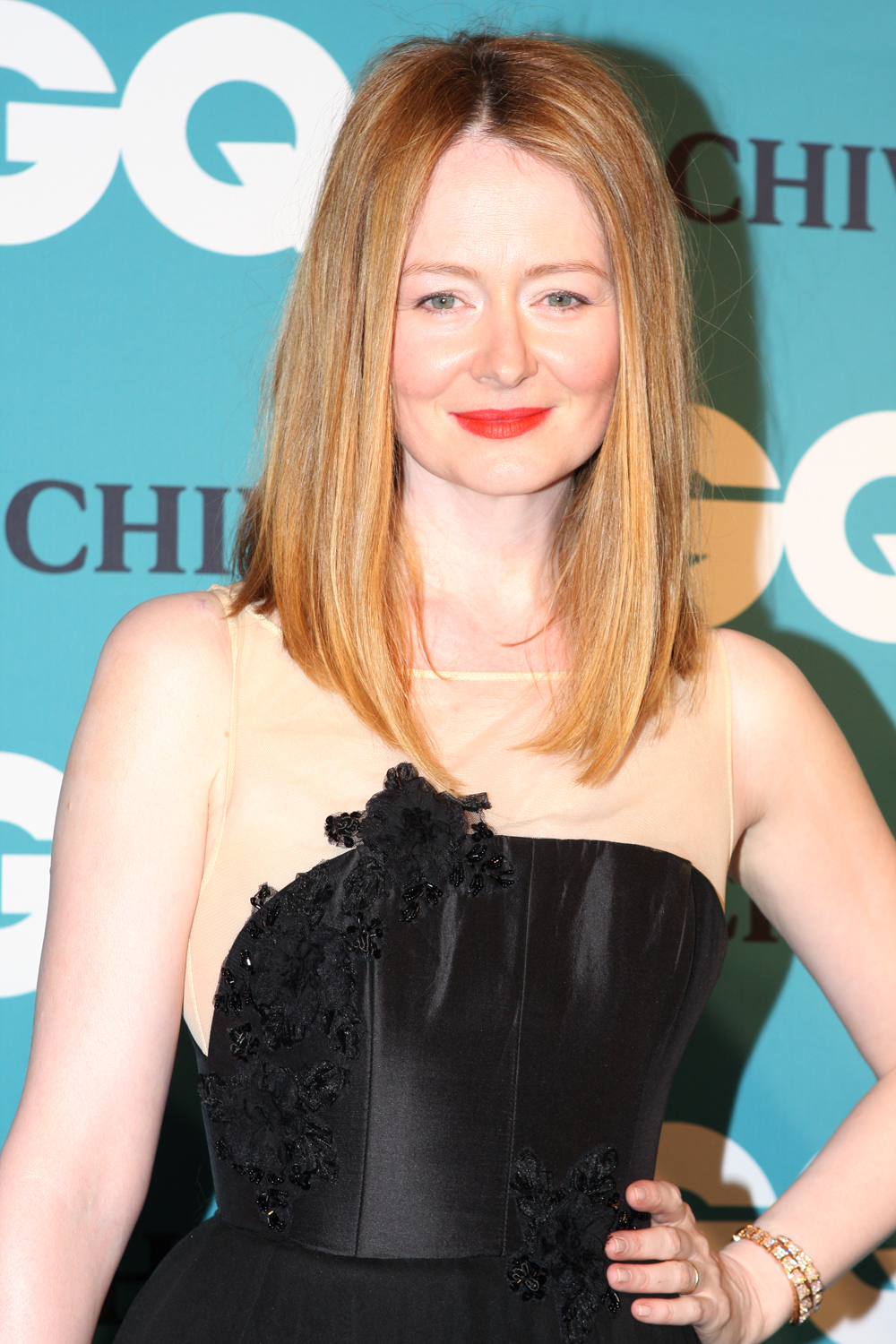
Otto at The Ivy Ballroom in 2013

On 13 November 2023, Otto was announced for ABC drama series Ladies In Black. In 2024, Otto reprised her role as Éowyn from Peter Jackson's The Lord of the Rings film series in the anime fantasy film The Lord of the Rings: The War of the Rohirrim, a prequel directed by Kenji Kamiyama, to which she served as the narrator.

=== Theatre ===
Otto made her theatrical debut in the 1986 production of The Bitter Tears of Petra Von Kant for the Sydney Theatre Company. Three more theatrical productions for the Sydney Theatre Company followed in the late 1980s and early 1990s. In 2002, she returned to the stage playing Nora Helmer in A Doll's House opposite her future husband Peter O'Brien. Otto's performance earned her a 2003 Helpmann Award nomination and the MO Award for "Best Female Actor in a Play".

Her next stage role was in the psychological thriller Boy Gets Girl (2005), in which she played Theresa, a journalist for a New York magazine. Otto committed to the project days before she found out she was pregnant. Robyn Nevin, the director, rescheduled the production from December 2004 to September 2005 so that Otto could appear in it.

== Personal life ==
On 1 January 2003, she married actor Peter O'Brien, after the two met while performing in A Doll's House. Otto and O'Brien have one child, a daughter. After the birth of her daughter, Otto limited her work to spend more time with her family at their home in Australia.

== Filmography ==
=== Film ===
Year	Title	Role	Notes
1986	Emma's War	Emma Grange	
1987	Initiation	Stevie	
1988	The 13th Floor	Rebecca	
1992	Daydream Believer	Nell Tiscowitz	Nominated—Australian Film Institute Award for Best Actress
1992	The Last Days of Chez Nous	Annie	Nominated—Australian Film Institute Award for Best Supporting Actress; Nominated—Film Critics Circle of Australia Award for Best Female Supporting Actor
1993	The Nostradamus Kid	Jennie O'Brien	
1995	Sex Is a Four Letter Word	Viv	
1996	Love Serenade	Dimity Hurley	
1997	The Well	Katherine	Nominated—Australian Film Institute Award for Best Actress; Nominated—Film Critics Circle of Australia Award for Best Female Actor
1997	True Love and Chaos	Mimi	
1997	Doing Time for Patsy Cline	Patsy Cline	
1998	Dead Letter Office	Alice Walsh	Nominated—Film Critics Circle of Australia Award for Best Female Actor
1998	In the Winter Dark	Ronnie	Nominated—Australian Film Institute Award for Best Supporting Actress
1998	The Thin Red Line	Marty Bell	
2000	Kin	Anna	
2000	What Lies Beneath	Mary Feur	
2001	The Three-Legged Fox	Ruth	
2001	Human Nature	Gabrielle	
2002	Close Your Eyes	Clara Strother	
2002	Julie Walking Home	Julie	
2002	The Lord of the Rings: The Two Towers	Éowyn	Online Film Critics Society Award for Best Cast; Internet Movie Award for Best Supporting Actress; Internet Movie Award for Breakthrough Performance; Nominated—Empire Award for Best Actress; Nominated—Screen Actors Guild Award for Outstanding Performance by a Cast in a Motion Picture
2003	The Lord of the Rings: The Return of the King	Éowyn	Broadcast Film Critics Association Award for Best Cast; Internet Movie Award for Best Supporting Actress; National Board of Review Award for Best Cast; Screen Actors Guild Award for Outstanding Performance by a Cast in a Motion Picture; Nominated—International Online Cinema Award for Best Supporting Actress; Nominated—Saturn Award for Best Supporting Actress
2003	Danny Deckchair	Glenda Lake	
2004	In My Father's Den	Penny	
2004	Flight of the Phoenix	Kelly Johnson	
2005	War of the Worlds	Mary Ann Ferrier	
2009	In Her Skin	Mrs Barber	
2009	Blessed	Bianca	
2010	South Solitary	Meredith Appleton	
2010	Get It at Goode's	Patty Williams	
2013	Reaching for the Moon	Elizabeth Bishop	
2013	The Turning	Sherry	
2014	I, Frankenstein	Queen Leonore	
2014	The Homesman	Theoline Belknapp	
2015	The Daughter	Charlotte Finch	AACTA Award for Best Actress in a Supporting Role
2017	Dance Academy: The Movie	Madeline Moncur	
2017	Annabelle: Creation	Esther Mullins	
2018	Zoe	The Designer	
2018	The Chaperone	Ruth St. Dennis	
2019	The Silence	Kelly Andrews	
2020	Downhill	Charlotte	
2022	Talk to Me	Sue	
2023	The Portable Door	Countess Judy	
2024	The Lord of the Rings: The War of the Rohirrim	Éowyn (voice)	Also narrator
2026	The Pout-Pout Fish	Marin (voice)	
TBA	Fog City	Dorothy Hargrove	Filming

=== Television ===
Year	Title	Role	Notes
1988	A Country Practice	Millie Alcott	TV series, 4 episodes
1992	Heroes II: The Return	Roma Page	TV film
1995	Police Rescue	Amanda	TV series, episode: "On the Outer"
1999	The Jack Bull	Cora Redding	TV film
2001	The Way We Live Now	Mrs Hurtle	Miniseries
2004	Through My Eyes: The Lindy Chamberlain Story	Lindy Chamberlain	Miniseries; Silver Logie Award for Most Outstanding Drama Actress; Nominated—Australian Film Institute Award for Best Lead Television Actress
2007	The Starter Wife	Cricket Stewart	Miniseries
2007	Cashmere Mafia	Juliet Draper	TV series, 7 episodes
2012	Miss Fisher's Murder Mysteries	Lydia Andrews	TV series, episode: "Cocaine Blues"
2014	Rake	Maddy Deane	TV series, 13 episodes
2015	Homeland	Allison Carr	TV series, 12 episodes Nominated—Screen Actors Guild Award for Outstanding Performance by an Ensemble in a Drama Series
2017	24: Legacy	Rebecca Ingram	TV series, 12 episodes
2018–2020	Chilling Adventures of Sabrina	Zelda Spellman	TV series, Main cast
2021	The Unusual Suspects	Sara Beasley	Miniseries, main cast
2021	Fires	Kath Simpson	TV series, 2 episodes
2022	True Colours	Isabelle Martin	TV series, main cast
2023	Koala Man	Mindy (voice)	TV series, episode: "Hot Christmas"
2023	The Clearing	Adrienne	TV series, 8 episodes
2023	Wellmania	Camille Lavigne	TV series, 1 episode
2024	Ladies In Black	Virginia Ambrose	TV series: 6 episodes
2024	Thou Shall Not Steal	Maxine	TV series

=== Television (as self) ===
Year	Title	Role	Notes
1996	Midday with Kerri-Anne	Herself – Guest	TV series, 1 episode
1997; 1998	The Movie Show	Herself – Guest	TV series, 1 episode
1997	Monday to Friday	Herself – Guest	TV series, 1 episode
1998; 2002	The Movie Show	Herself – Guest	TV series, 1 episode
2002	The Movie Show	Herself – Guest (from Venice Film Festival)	TV series, 1 episode
2023; 2024	News Breakfast	Herself - Guest	TV series, 1 episode
2023	The Project	Herself - Guest (with Teresa Palmer)	TV series, 1 episode
2024	News Breakfast	Herself & Gracie Otto	TV series, 1 episode
2024	Who Do You Think You Are?	Herself	TV series, 1 episode

== Theatre ==
Year	Title	Role	Notes
1986	The Bitter Tears of Petra Von Kant		Wharf Studio Theatre with Sydney Theatre Company
1986	The Real Thing		Playhouse Newcastle with Hunter Valley Theatre Company
1991	Sixteen Words for Water	Betsy	Wharf Theatre with Sydney Theatre Company
1992	Time and the Room	Sleep Woman	Wharf Studio Theatre with Sydney Theatre Company
1992	The Girl Who Saw Everything	Edwina Rouse	Wharf Theatre with Sydney Theatre Company
1993	Brilliant Lies	Susy	Suncorp Theatre, Playhouse Melbourne, Monash University, Her Majesty’s Theatre Ballarat, Ford Theatre Geelong, West Gippsland Arts Centre, Theatre Royal, Hobart, Playhouse Adelaide, Sydney Opera House, Canberra Theatre with Queensland Theatre Company
1995	Gigi	Gigi	Suncorp Theatre, Brisbane with Queensland Theatre Company
2002	A Doll’s House	Nora Helmer	Wharf 1 Theatre with Sydney Theatre Company
2002	Hanging Man	Casting Director	Wharf 2 Theatre with Sydney Theatre Company
2005	Boy Gets Girl	Theresa Bedell	Wharf 1 Theatre with Sydney Theatre Company
2011	The White Guard	Lena	Sydney Theatre Company

== Awards and nominations ==
Year	Awards	Category	Nominated work	Result
1992	Australian Film Institute	Best Actress in a Supporting Role	The Girl Who Came Late	Nominated
1992	Australian Film Institute	Best Actress in a Supporting Role	The Last Days of Chez Nous	Nominated
1993	Film Critics Circle of Australia Awards	Best Supporting Actor – Female	The Last Days of Chez Nous	Nominated
1996	Film Critics Circle of Australia Awards	Best Actor – Female	Love Serenade	Nominated
1997	Australian Film Institute	Best Performance by an Actress in a Leading Role	The Well	Nominated
1998	Australian Film Institute	Best Performance by an Actress in a Supporting Role	In the Winter Dark	Nominated
1998	Film Critics Circle of Australia Awards	Best Actor – Female	The Well	Nominated
1999	Film Critics Circle of Australia Awards	Best Actor – Female	Dead Letter Office	Nominated
1999	Satellite Awards	Outstanding Motion Picture Ensemble	The Thin Red Line	Won
2002	Awards Circuit Community Awards	Best Cast Ensemble	The Lord of the Rings: The Two Towers	Nominated
2003	Empire Awards	Best Actress	The Lord of the Rings: The Two Towers	Nominated
2003	Gold Derby	Ensemble Cast	The Lord of the Rings: The Two Towers	Nominated
2003	Online Film Critics Society Awards	Best Ensemble	The Lord of the Rings: The Two Towers	Won
2003	Phoenix Film Critics Society Awards	Best Acting Ensemble	The Lord of the Rings: The Two Towers	Won
2003	Screen Actors Guild Awards	Outstanding Performance by the Cast of a Theatrical Motion Picture	The Lord of the Rings: The Two Towers	Nominated
2003	Newport Beach Film Festival	Best Actress	Julie Walking Home	Won
2003	Helpmann Award	Best Female Actor in a Play	A Doll's House	Nominated
2003	Mo Awards	Best Female Actor in a Play	A Doll's House	Won
2003	Awards Circuit Community Awards	Best Cast Ensemble	The Lord of the Rings: The Return of the King	Won
2003	DVD Exclusive Awards	Best Audio Commentary (New for DVD)	The Lord of the Rings: The Return of the King	Nominated
2003	Golden Schmoes Awards	Best Supporting Actress of the Year	The Lord of the Rings: The Return of the King	Nominated
2003	National Board of Review	Best Acting by an Ensemble	The Lord of the Rings: The Return of the King	Won
2004	Saturn Awards	Best Supporting Actress	The Lord of the Rings: The Return of the King	Nominated
2004	Critics' Choice Movie Awards	Best Acting Ensemble	The Lord of the Rings: The Return of the King	Won
2004	Gold Derby	Ensemble Cast	The Lord of the Rings: The Return of the King	Won
2004	International Online Cinema Awards	Best Supporting Actress	The Lord of the Rings: The Return of the King	Nominated
2004	Phoenix Film Critics Society Awards	Best Ensemble Acting	The Lord of the Rings: The Return of the King	Nominated
2004	Screen Actors Guild Awards	Outstanding Performance by a Cast in a Motion Picture	The Lord of the Rings: The Return of the King	Won
2005	Logie Awards	Most Outstanding Actress in a Drama Series	Through My Eyes	Won
2005	Australian Film Institute	Best Lead Actress in Television	Through My Eyes	Nominated
2011	Film Critics Circle of Australia Awards	Best Actor – Female	South Solitary	Nominated
2011	InStyle Women Of Style Award	Arts & Culture		Won
2012	Helpmann Award	Best Female Actor in a Supporting Role – Play	The White Guard	Nominated
2014	Women Film Critics Circle Awards	Best Ensemble Cast	The Homesman	Won
2016	Screen Actors Guild Awards	Outstanding Performance by an Ensemble in a Drama Series	Homeland	Nominated
2016	AACTA Award	Best Supporting Actress	The Daughter	Won
2017	Australian Film Critics Association	Best Supporting Actress	The Daughter	Nominated
2017	Film Critics Circle of Australia Awards	Best Actress – Supporting Role	The Daughter	Won
2021	AACTA Award	Best Lead Actress in a Drama	Fires	Nominated
