= Salvatore Coco =

Australian actor

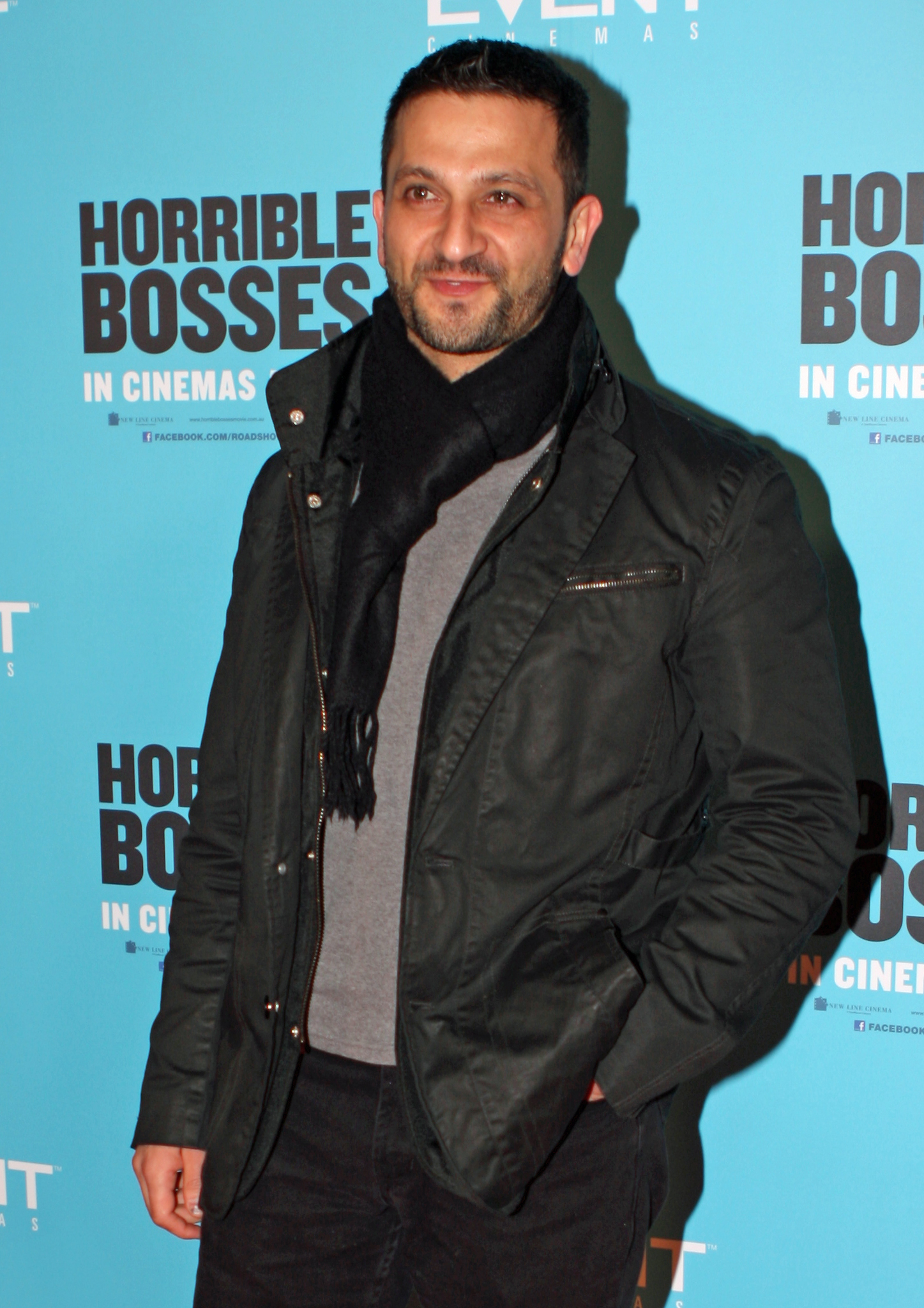
- Coco in August 2011
- Born: 22 April 1975 (age 51); Sydney, Australia
- Occupations: Actor, Singer, Voice Artist
- Years active: 1991-

Salvatore Coco (born 22 April 1975) is an Australian film and television actor of Italian descent.

== Early life ==
Coco was born in Sydney and is of Sicilian (from Italy) descent. He performed with the Australian Theatre for Young People, where he developed his talents in acting, singing, guitar, dance and cabaret. He is also a qualified chef.

== Career ==
Coco began his acting career with guest roles in television series such as G.P. and the mini-series Brides of Christ. He is best known for his role as Con Bordino in the television series Heartbreak High. After two years in that role, Coco joined the cast of the final series of Police Rescue as Joseph Cardillo. He had many guest roles in television series such as Country Practice, Water Rats, Wildside, Stingers, Love My Way, East West 101, All Saints and Farscape. His feature film credits include a lead role in Walk the Talk and roles in Looking for Alibrandi, Bootmen and Two Hands. On television, he played Harry Hammoud, Kings Cross standover man and friend of John Ibrahim in the third instalment of the Underbelly series, The Golden Mile, in 2010. He also played Frank Calabrisi in the four-part drama The Principal in 2015, Bruno Rossi in The Secret Daughter in 2016, and was seen in Brock that same year.

Coco also appeared in the 2020 series Informer 3838 in the role of Steve Moore.

Salvatore reprised the role of Dimitri in Home and Away in 2022 as the father of Theo.

== Filmography ==
=== Film ===
Year	Title	Role	Notes
2018	Harmony	Junkie	Feature film
2015	Damaged	Guard Reiner	
2013	Depths	Saverio	Short film
2011	Ricky and Juliet	Ricky	Short film
2009	The Neighbour		
2009	A Model Daughter: The Killing of Caroline Byrne	Angelo Georgillo	TV movie
2008	The Sin Bleeder	Sal	Short film
2008	The Informant	Ian Lincoln	TV movie
2008	Scorched	Research Co-ordinator	TV movie
2007	Almost	Rocky Maldini	
2006	The New Life	Bee	Short film
2004	Blackjack Sweet Science	Mozz	TV movie
2002	Diagnosis Narcolepsy	Taxi Driver	
2001	South Pacific	Devito	TV movie
2000	Bootmen	Ricco the roadie	Feature film
2000	Walk the Talk	Joey Grasso	Feature film
2000	Looking for Alibrandi	Angelo Pezzini	Feature film
1999	Airtight	Dimitri	TV movie
1999	Two Hands	Young Greek Man	Feature film
1997	Heaven's Burning	Gullbuddin	Feature film
1992	Big Ideas	Ernesto	TV movie

=== Television ===
Year	Title	Role	Notes
2021	Australian Gangster	Les Elias	2 episodes
2020	Informer 3838	Steve Moore	2 episodes
2019	SeaChange	Rocco Bellini	3 episodes
2018	Rake	Loz	1 episode
2016	The Secret Daughter	Bruno Rossi	5 episodes
2016	Brock	Jack 'Peanut' Freebody	2 episodes
2016	Hyde and Seek	Marty	1 episode
2015	The Principal	Frank Calabrisi	3 episodes
2015	Catching Milat	Detective Mark Camenzuli	2 episodes
2010	Cops LAC	William	1 episode
2010	Rescue Special Ops	Matty Conti	1 episode
2010	Underbelly	Harry Hammoud	12 episodes
2010	Sea Patrol	Sergio Jamali	1 episode
2007	East West 101	Beatty	1 episode
2007	All Saints	Tony Zammit	1 episode
2004	Love My Way	Nick Papendou	2 episodes
2004	Stingers	Vince Zamerto	1 episode
2003	Bad Cop Bad Cop	Jimmy the Greek	1 episode
2003, 2005, 2022	Home and Away	Dimitri Poulos	15 episodes
2002	Farscape	Voodi	1 episode
1997, 1999	Water Rats	Michael Gallo (1997) / Alex Granville (1999)	3 episodes
1998	A Difficult Woman	Valet	3 episodes
1998	Wildside	Mark Toilos	2 episodes
1997	Spellbinder: Land of the Dragon Lord	Jimbo	2 episodes
1994–1997	Heartbreak High	Con Bordino	72 episodes
1996	Twisted	Sav Rocca	1 episode
1992,	Police Rescue	Nick (1992) / Joe Cardillo (1996)	10 episodes
1996	Pacific Drive	Nick Kelly	
1992	A Country Practice	Howie Scott	1 episode
1991	Brides of Christ	Joe	1 episode
1991	G.P.	Dino	1 episode
