= List of Portuguese films of 2022 =

This is a list of Portuguese films released in 2022.

== Films ==
| Title | Director | Cast | Notes | Ref |
|---|---|---|---|---|
| Dry Ground Burning (Mato seco em chamas) | Joana Pimenta, Adirley Queirós | | Portugal-Brazil coproduction | |
| Mistida | Falcão Nhaga | | | |
| Pacifiction (Tourment sur les îles) | Albert Serra | Benoît Magimel, Pahoa Mahagafanau, Marc Susini, Matahi Pambrun, Alexandre Melo, Sergi López, Montse Triola, Michael Vautor, Cécile Guilbert, Lluis Serrat, Mike Landscape, Cyrus Arai, Mareva Wong, Baptiste Pinteaux | France-Spain-Germany-Portugal coproduction | |
| Remains of the Wind (Restos do vento) | Tiago Guedes | | | |
| Will-o'-the-Wisp (Fogo-Fátuo) | João Pedro Rodrigues | Mauro Costa, André Cabral | | |
