= Marcello Mastroianni: I Remember =

1997 film

- US DVD cover
- Directed by: Anna Maria Tatò
- Written by: Anna Maria Tatò
- Produced by: Mario Di Biase
- Starring: Marcello Mastroianni
- Cinematography: Giuseppe Rotunno
- Edited by: Anna Maria Tatò
- Music by: Armando Trovajoli
- Release date: 10 September 1997
- Running time: 194 minutes
- Country: Italy
- Language: Italian

Marcello Mastroianni: I Remember (Italian: Marcello Mastroianni: mi ricordo, sì, io mi ricordo) is a 1997 Italian documentary film about the actor Marcello Mastroianni and directed by Anna Maria Tatò. It was screened in the Un Certain Regard section at the 1997 Cannes Film Festival.

== Cast ==
- Marcello Mastroianni - Himself
- Renato Berta - Himself
- Manoel de Oliveira - Himself
- Diogo Dória - Himself
- Leonor Silveira - Herself

== Release ==
Mastroianni's estranged wife Flora Carabella as well as his former partner, Catherine Deneuve, and their daughter, Chiara Mastroianni, tried to block the film from release. They were unsuccessful and the film went on to play at the 1997 Cannes Film Festival.

== Reception ==
On review aggregator website Rotten Tomatoes, the film holds an approval rating of 100% based on 8 reviews, with an average rating of 7.8/10.
