= South Solitary =

- DVD cover
- Directed by: Shirley Barrett
- Written by: Shirley Barrett
- Produced by: Miranda Culley
- Starring: Miranda Otto; Marton Csokas
- Cinematography: Anna Howard
- Music by: Mary Finsterer
- Distributed by: Icon Film Distribution
- Release date: 29 July 2010 (Australia)
- Running time: 121 minutes
- Country: Australia
- Language: English
- Box office: $5441 (New Zealand); A$279,341 (Australia)

South Solitary is a 2010 Australian romance film set on South Solitary Island and directed by Shirley Barrett.

== Plot ==
In 1928, Meredith Appleton (Miranda Otto) arrives on South Solitary island with her elderly uncle George Wadsworth (Barry Otto). Her uncle has been sent as the new Head Lighthouse Keeper after the suicide of the previous one. Her uncle is a gruff man, very critical of the slightest disorder.

Meredith meets local girl Nettie (Annie Martin), whom she asks to care for her lamb. She then meets Nettie's mother, Alma Stanley (Essie Davis), and her two sons, Tom (Reef Ireland) and Robbie (Benson Adams). The father, Harry Stanley (Rohan Nichol) takes George for a tour of inspection, during which George expresses disapproval of the state of loose animals, the absence of lighthouse keeper Jack Fleet (Marton Csokas), and a history of lighthouse outages.

On the first night, as Meredith is preparing tea for her uncle, she hears baby birds chirping in the stovepipe so she douses the fire and is not able to prepare hot tea for her uncle. Jack Fleet has a panic attack on his watch, brought on by his war trauma. Nettie introduces Meredith to the unreliable emergency message system using homing pigeons. When Nettie tries to send a routine message that all is well on South Solitary the birds return to their coop thus rendering the system useless.

While having afternoon tea with Alma, Meredith reveals to the unsympathetic mother that she is unable to give birth. She lost her fiancé in World War I, then became pregnant through an affair with a married man, but complications meant her womb had been removed. Making friends with South Solitary’s strange residents is hard for Meredith who finds the isolation difficult. Harry visits her during her bath and seduces her. Sent to fetch her dad, Nettie sees Meredith and Harry in bed together and tells her mother, who tells George. The family quits the island on the next available ship.

While pushing up a store of supplies from the beach without Stanley to help, George over-exerts himself, becomes very ill with a heart attack and dies. Jack must keep solitary watch because there is no one else, and proves himself a sensitive and capable keeper. Together the pair bury George and provide a eulogy for him. A gale sets in, stranding Meredith at the lighthouse with Fleet for several days, during which she gets to know him, andlearns how to turn on the light and use the flag semaphore system. She tells Jack about her sense of loneliness and her desire for a sense of permanence. The conversation disturbs Jack, who has a panic attack, with hallucinations of a ship in distress, and runs off into the wilderness.

Covering the island, Meredith finds her lost lamb which Jack helps her to recover. Jack sees a ship in the distance and signals for it to pick up Meredith, although wants to stay. She begs him not to send her away, but he finds it too stressful having close company and refuses. As she leaves they kiss, and arrange to keep in touch, and that Jack will visit when he next has leave. Meredith looks out for him from the water then catches sight of the semaphore message he has displayed. She is seen smiling as she draws away from South Solitary.

== Cast ==
- Miranda Otto ... Meredith Appleton
- Marton Csokas ... Jack Fleet
- Rohan Nichol ... Harry Stanley
- Essie Davis ... Alma Stanley
- Barry Otto ... George Wadsworth
- Annie Martin ... Nettie Stanley

== Reviews ==
Rotten Tomatoes gave the film a 71% with a rating of 5.6 out of 10. Out of 17 reviews counted, 12 gave it a positive review and 6 gave it a negative review.
