= The Night and the Moment =

1994 film by Anna Maria Tatò

- Theatrical release poster
- Directed by: Anna Maria Tatò
- Screenplay by: Jean-Claude Carrière; Anna Maria Tatò
- Based on: La Nuit et le Moment by Crebillon Fils
- Produced by: Boudjemaa Dahmane; Pierre Novat
- Starring: Willem Dafoe; Lena Olin; Miranda Richardson; Jean-Claude Carrière; Carole Richert
- Cinematography: Giuseppe Rotunno
- Edited by: Ruggero Mastroianni
- Music by: Ennio Morricone
- Production companies: Arthur Pictures; SFP Cinema; Cecchi Gori Group Tiger
- Distributed by: MKL Distribution (France)
- Release dates: 4 September 1994 (Venice); 9 June 1995 (Italy); 5 July 1995 (France)
- Running time: 86 minutes
- Countries: France; United Kingdom; Italy
- Language: English

The Night and the Moment is a 1994 erotic drama film co-written and directed by Anna Maria Tatò and starring Willem Dafoe, Lena Olin and Miranda Richardson. It was screened out of competition at the 51st Venice International Film Festival.

== Synopsis ==
A writer (Dafoe) is invited to the house of a noblewoman (Olin) who adores free-thinkers. He attempts to seduce her but she insists that he tell her of his past love exploits. While doing so, he takes her through his time in prison where he was unknowingly incarcerated in the cell beside hers.

== Cast ==
- Willem Dafoe as the writer
- Lena Olin as the marquise
- Miranda Richardson as Julie
- Jean-Claude Carrière as the governor
- Christine Sireyzol as Justine
- Carole Richert as Armande
