= Richard Miller (visual effects) =

American artist (1942–2022)

Richard Miller (December 6, 1942 – December 8, 2022) was an American sculptor and visual effects artist. He worked on such films as Star Trek: First Contact, Who Framed Roger Rabbit, and The Rocketeer. He created Princess Leia's bikini costume, which appeared in the 1983 film Return of the Jedi.

Miller died in Northern California on December 8, 2022, at the age of 80.
