= Anna Maria Tatò =

Italian film director (1940–2022)

- Born: 19 April 1940; Barletta, Italy
- Died: 3 June 2022 (aged 82); Rome, Italy
- Occupation: Film director
- Years active: 1978–1997
- Partner: Marcello Mastroianni (1976–1996; his death)

Anna Maria Tatò (19 April 1940 – 3 June 2022) was an Italian film director. She directed six films between 1978 and 1997. Her film Marcello Mastroianni: mi ricordo, sì, io mi ricordo was screened in the Un Certain Regard section at the 1997 Cannes Film Festival.

== Filmography ==
- Le serpentine d'oro (1978)
- Doppio sogno dei Sigg. X (1980)
- Desiderio (1983)
- L'addio a Enrico Berlinguer (1984)
- The Night and the Moment (1995)
- Marcello Mastroianni: mi ricordo, sì, io mi ricordo (1997)

== Personal life ==
By 1976, she became involved with Marcello Mastroianni. They remained together until his death in 1996.
