= Love Serenade =

- Directed by: Shirley Barrett
- Screenplay by: Shirley Barrett
- Produced by: Jan Chapman
- Starring: Miranda Otto; Rebecca Frith; George Shevtsov
- Cinematography: Mandy Walker
- Edited by: Denise Haratzis
- Distributed by: Beyond Films (Australia); Miramax Films (international)
- Release date: 20 May 1996
- Running time: 101 minutes
- Country: Australia
- Language: English
- Box office: $836,110

Love Serenade is a 1996 Australian comedy film written and directed by Shirley Barrett. It has the tagline: "Two sisters will do anything to hook the right man".

There are not many characters in Love Serenade, which is set in a fictitious, almost-deserted town called Sunray, located on the Murray River. It is a thinly disguised version of Robinvale, Victoria, which was the location of the film.

== Synopsis ==
Dimity and Vicki-Ann are a pair of siblings living in the town of Sunray. The shy and unsmiling Dimity works at a local Chinese restaurant owned by Albert, while the brash Vicki-Ann works as a hair stylist. The two are immediately taken with a Ken Sherry, a thrice divorced Brisbane DJ personality who has moved next door in order to work at the local radio station. Vicki-Ann immediately announces her intent to date Sherry, however it is Dimity who ends up sleeping with him first. She enters into a sexual relationship with Sherry that she mistakes as romantic, while Vicki-Ann continues her own pursuit. This causes the man to generally muse on-air about his interactions with women, admitting that he is "old enough to know better" before saying that he is not the one at fault

Vicki-Ann and Sherry go on a date at Dimity's workplace, upsetting the young woman. Later that same night Sherry seduces Vicki-Ann and an upset Dimity enters Sherry's house but is unable to locate them. The following morning Sherry tells a disgusted Dimity that he is willing to have sexual relationships with both sisters. She believes that she sees gills on his neck and leaves to talk to Albert, who suggests that he is actually a fish. Later that day Vicki-Ann tells Dimity that she will be marrying Sherry, to which Dimity responds that she believes him to be a fish.

Vicki-Ann later dons a wedding dress and approaches Sherry, who rejects her and asks that she never bother him again. This causes her to experience an anxiety attack and climb a silo. Dimity is able to get an apathetic Sherry to come to the rescue, where he tells her that he cannot commit to any one woman. He talks about how he has set both sisters free and wishes for Vicki-Ann to do the same. A smiling Dimity then pushes Sherry off the silo. The sisters take Sherry's body to the lake for disposal. Dimity ties a balloon to his body before they push him into the lake. His body resurfaces, terrifying the two women as he appears to swim away. It is left unanswered if Sherry was actually a fish or if he was being carried away by a large carp rumored to live within the water, the currents, or both.

== Cast ==
- Miranda Otto – Dimity Hurley
- Rebecca Frith – Vicki-Ann Hurley
- George Shevtsov – Kenneth "Ken" Sherry
- John Alansu – Albert Lee
- Jessica Napier – Deborah "Debbie"
- Jill McWilliam – Curler Victim
- Ryan Jackson – Boy on Bike (Ride)
- Sabrina Norris – Beautiful Baby

== Production ==
During the filming of the Silo Scene, stuntman Collin Dragsbaek died when he fell onto a faulty airbag.

== Release ==
Love Serenade premiered on 20 May 1996 at the Cannes Film Festival, where it was screened as part of Un Certain Regard. It was given a theatrical release in Australia on 10 October of the same year.

=== Box office ===
Love Serenade grossed $836,110 at the box office in Australia.

== Reception ==
Love Serenade has a rating of 90% "fresh" on Rotten Tomatoes, based on 10 reviews.

=== Awards ===
The film was screened in the Un Certain Regard section at the 1996 Cannes Film Festival, where it won the Caméra d'Or.

== See also ==
- Cinema of Australia
