= Marshal Bennett =

Marshal Bennett was a barque launched in Liverpool in 1820. It was employed in voyages in different parts of the world for many years, up to c.1860. The ship took its name from the Belize merchant Marshall Bennett (no fixed spelling), who was not the owner, the naming being honorific; and gave it to the Marshall Bennett Islands, now part of Papua New Guinea, when in 1836 the barque's whaler captain Robert L. Hunter adopted for the island group the name of his vessel.

== 1820s ==
An editorial "Piracies in the West Indies" in the Liverpool Mercury for 20 September 1822 mentioned the Marshal Bennett, as "about to proceed for the Bay of Honduras, completely armed, manned, and equipped, as a letter of marque. It was reported in March 1823 that the Marshal Bennett, captain D. M'Arthur, had arrived at Liverpool from Honduras with 288 logs of mahogany and other cargo. As D. McArthur, he was still associated with the barque in the 1829 Honduras Almanack.

At the beginning of 1829 the Marshal Bennett arrived in Barbados, acting as a troop ship, with the William Harris for the 19th Regiment, 27th Regiment and 93rd Regiment. On 19 May 1829, still as a transport, she arrived at Dominica. She arrived at Portsmouth from Barbados in 31 days.

== 1830s ==
In March 1835, the Marshal Bennett set sail from London to the South Seas as a whaler, captain Hunter, owner Soames. She passed through the Banks Islands in December.

The Marshal Bennett arrived in New Zealand at the Bay of Islands on 15 January 1836 with 250 barrels, departing again on 21 January. She passed through Bougainville Strait at the end of July. In September Hunter had the encounter with the Marshall Bennett Islands, in the Solomon Sea, that led to the islands bearing the name of the ship.

In October 1836 the Marshal Bennett visited the Massim, anchoring off Kiriwina, and visiting Woodlark Island, also that year. Hunter sent details of the journey for publication in the Nautical Magazine, his paper appearing in 1840.

The return journey from the Maluku Islands started on 16 March 1838, reached St Helena on 17 June, and arrived at the Downs off the English coast on 20 August.

Scrimshaw survives by George LeCluse, British armourer on the Marshal Bennett 1839–1843.

== 1840s ==
An incident off Samboangan (Zamboanga City), Mindanao, on 14 June 1842 caused salvage litigation. The barque Ann was stranded on a coral reef. She was assisted by the Marshal Bennett, the Australia Packet, and two boats from the Cyrus whaler. Seeking repair, and not permitted it on the Philippines, the Ann went in convoy with the Marshal Bennett to Surabaya. In court 5% of the value of her tea cargo was awarded by Stephen Lushington to the rescuers, most going to the masters of the Marshal Bennett.

In March 1843 the Marshal Bennett was up for sale, at the East Country Dock, Rotherhithe, commander R. L. Hunter.

While lying in the Brunswick Dock, Liverpool, with a cargo of cotton and cannel coal, the Marshal Bennett suffered fire damage on 16 May 1846. The owner was its master Captain Walters. Water from fire engines filled the barque to above the level of the deck. On 20 July 1847, the Marshal Bennett sailed from Cowes for Riga.

In January 1848 the Marshal Bennett was at Naples, captain M'Ausland, arrived from Alexandria. Lloyd's List in October of that year had her at Constantinople, same captain, owner Rogers. On the night of 3 December 1848 she was in The Downs in a storm, while bound for Constantinople, and suffered a collision in which she lost the bowsprit and a crew member, with the Christiana, for New York. Litigation followed (Edmund Hammond and others v. John Rogers and John Rodd), with the decision of the High Court of Admiralty appealed to the Privy Council, which upheld it.

== 1850s ==
On 2 October 1851 the Marshal Bennett was at Appledore in Devon.

George Backhaus was a passenger from Adelaide to Melbourne in 11 days on the Marshal Bennett in March 1852. On 23 December 1852 she sailed from Plymouth with an emigrant cargo of government passengers, and arrived after a difficult journey at Port Adelaide, South Australia on 28 April 1853—practically down to her gunwales. In 1854 the vessel was chartered through the agent J. H. Rogers for emigration to Victoria. In April of that year it was at the West India Dock in London, advertised to depart shortly to take on passengers at Southampton, for a direct journey to Geelong, by Rogers brokers at 2 White Hart Court, Lombard Street.

In 1856 the Marshall Bennett was taken on as a government transport, to Balaklava, captain Harris.
