= Women of the World =

- Theatrical poster
- Directed by: Gualtiero Jacopetti; Paolo Cavara; Franco Prosperi
- Written by: Gualtiero Jacopetti; Paolo Cavara; Franco Prosperi
- Produced by: Gualtiero Jacopetti; Paolo Cavara; Franco Prosperi
- Narrated by: Stefano Sibaldi; Peter Ustinov (English-language version)
- Cinematography: Antonio Climati; Benito Frattari
- Edited by: Gualtiero Jacopetti
- Music by: Nino Oliviero; Riz Ortolani orchestrated and conducted by Riz Ortolani
- Production company: Cineriz
- Distributed by: Embassy Pictures
- Release date: 30 January 1963 (Italy)
- Running time: 110 minutes
- Country: Italy
- Language: Italian

Women of the World (original title La donna nel mondo) is a 1963 Italian mondo film, also described as a "shockumentary", written and directed by filmmakers Gualtiero Jacopetti, Paolo Cavara, and Franco Prosperi. It was rushed into release on 30 January, following the international box-office success achieved by its predecessor, the initial mondo film, Mondo Cane, which premiered in Italy ten months earlier, 30 March 1962. The English language print was narrated by Peter Ustinov.

Following the pattern set by the original concept and consisting mostly of leftover footage from the first film, Women of the World is, again, a series of travelogue vignettes which provide glimpses into the lives of its title subjects, with the intention of shocking or surprising Western film audiences. However, unlike the previous film which had no specific central subject matter, but rather presented a kaleidoscopic display of shocking content, the second film was marketed as directly promising a titillating display of feminine flesh and intrigue as well as exotic sexual practices. As with the first film, despite its claims of being a genuine documentary, a number of the depicted scenes are either staged or creatively manipulated.

== Vignettes ==
=== Israel, Iwa Island, Australia ===
The film opens with servicemen in dress uniform, participants in a festive march down city streets, gazing at the women lining the streets. Staying with the military theme, Israeli women soldiers, serving alongside their male counterparts, are shown enjoying nude bathing. Then, thousands of kilometers in another direction, Roger Hopkins, a retired Scotsman who once held the rank of colonel, is visited on tropical Iwa Island, 200 kilometers [130 miles] from mainland New Guinea, where he lives with his 84 "wives", who are aged from about 13 to 18, and their 52 children. On another warm island, off the coast of Australia, the absence of women causes some, many, or most members of the island's male population to act out the roles of seductive mermaids.

=== Paris, Ravenna, Sweden, Papua New Guinea, China ===
Turning the focus to Europe, French summer behavior also elevates the temperature, as July celebrations of Bastille Day in Paris include passionate public kissing among strangers in the streets. Then, to Italy, where, in the city of Ravenna, the military statue of 15th-century condottiero Guidarello Guidarelli is the object of endless kisses from visiting women who stand in line for the privilege. In a brief look at women's subservient roles in religion, Sweden's sole female minister is shown conducting mass. Then the focus is back in Paris to observe cabarets welcoming gays and lesbians. Returning to the faraway jungles of Papua New Guinea, homosexual tribesmen preen while decorating themselves, while the tribeswomen are shown doing endless chores. Back in France, on the nudist Île du Levant, bodies are fully on display, while in China, women, afraid of sun rays injuring their skin, take outdoor baths while wearing light gowns.

=== New Guinea, Sardinia, Cannes Film Festival, Hollywood, Japan, Malaysia ===
On to New Guinea again, where local women are shown attempting to make their skin less dark by bathing in mud. On the large Italian island of Sardinia, funeral services are enhanced by a paid display of female grief, while back on tropical islands, Tahitian women launch into sensual dance routines. Then, another look at France, as starlets participate in an annual routine at the Cannes Film Festival by stripping down to the briefest of bikinis as they pose and parade for photographers. Their American counterparts in Hollywood are shown marking time waiting for their big break by taking any available employment, such as running an elevator or pumping gas. A photographer takes endless photographs of innumerable women so that he can merge their characteristics into one perfect specimen.

In contrast, Japanese women seek perfection in surgical enhancements for their eyes. In America, rubber falsies, which make breasts appear more prominent, are a huge industry. Back in Southeast Asia, Malaysian villagers realistically simulate labor pains at the same moments as the mothers of their children go through the birth process.

=== Hamburg, Stockholm, South of Italy, Sidney, America, Honolulu, Las Vegas ===
Sex in Europe comes into focus next, as German prostitutes wave at passersby from their apartment buildings in the red-light district of Hamburg, while in Sweden, a dormitory in a Stockholm school is preoccupied with intimate activity, and in other parts of the country, girls in their teens and early twenties hitchhike and accept rides from lecherous male drivers. In the South of Italy, sexual activity takes place immediately after the marital vows are pronounced, while the same region's women who died "dishonored" are not allowed to be interred in marked graves. In Australia, bowls are played on the lawn of a Sydney cemetery by the Sporting Widows Association and, in America, the car is the favorite venue for young women to lose their virginity, a specially built tree house in Honolulu is a popular place for honeymooners to spend their first night and, in Las Vegas dude ranches, cowboys make a habit of visiting and comforting/entertaining women who go there to finalize their divorces.

=== Japan, Washington, New York, Singapore, Hong Kong, Kenya, Borneo, Arabian desert, New Zealand, Switzerland, Middle East, Lourdes ===
In Japan, dangerous diving for seaweed and pearls is done by women while, in America, powerful women are seen at work — United States Treasurer Elizabeth Rudel Smith who inspects the Bureau of Engraving each day and a New York-based female bank president who chairs a meeting of the bank's directors. Back in Southeast Asia, the "Sisterhood of the Night Butterflies" in Singapore gives thanks for enjoying prosperity during the cycle of business activity, and prostitution in Hong Kong is combatted by female police officers. Faraway and exotic locations are visited as Masai tribe members are baptized by nuns working as missionaries in Kenya, a European fashion pageant appears baffling to native women, tattoos are imprinted upon women in the Borneo jungle, while plastic surgeons cut into the flesh of European women who aspire to improve their appearance. In the Arabian Desert, women in Bedouin tribes hold similar hopes as they rub creamed camel effluvia into their facial skin. Childbirth ritual among New Zealand's Māori involves dangerous feats of daring which the men perform while the mothers of their children are giving birth. Remaining with the topic of birth, a clinic in Switzerland is shown giving instructions in painless labor. Women in an Arab conflict zone risk their lives by running into battlefields to collect shrapnel which they sell for scrap metal, collecting small amounts of money to feed their children. At the end, children deformed by the drug Thalidomide are shown with their suffering mothers, while other crestfallen mothers travel to Lourdes as pilgrims to beseech God for their children's cure.

== Dedication to Belinda Lee ==
During the opening credits as well as the sequence highlighting the Cannes Film Festival, clips are shown from the Festival's 1955 appearance of English ingenue and leading actress in Italian exploitation films Belinda Lee, who died two years earlier, in a March 1961 auto crash which also injured the film's writers/producers Gualtiero Jacopetti, with whom she was involved in a personal relationship, and Paolo Cavara. The final segment of the opening credits depicts the dedication: "To Belinda Lee, who throughout this long journey accompanied and helped us with love" (this caption is seen against the background of an overcast sky with an aloft jetliner — the jazzy title score is suddenly replaced with total silence for the ten seconds that the caption remains on the screen — and then the music resumes).

== Censorship ==
The Memphis, Tennessee, film censor board requested cuts of four sequences before the film could be shown in the city. The film distributor refused and filed suit against the Memphis Censor Board in federal court. In a 1965 decision, the United States District Court for the Western District of Tennessee held that the city ordinances under which the board operated were unconstitutional, resulting in the board shutting down.

== Bibliography ==
- Goodall, Mark. Sweet & Savage: The World Through the Shockumentary Film Lens. London: Headpress, 2006.
- Kerekes, David and Slater, David. Killing for Culture: An Illustrated History of Death Film from Mondo to Snuff. London: Creation Books, 1995.
- Loparco, Stefano. 'Gualtiero Jacopetti – Graffi sul mondo'. The first complete biography dedicated to the co-director of 'Mondo cane'. Il Foglio Letterario, 2014 – ISBN 9788876064760
- Fogliato, Fabrizio. Paolo Cavara. Gli occhi che raccontano il mondo Il Foglio Letterario 2014. (never previously published study of Mondo Cane's co-creator; a critical analysis of Cavara's artistic approach to Mondo Cane and La donna nel mondo (pp. 57–88; 187–212)
