= Alexei Grabco =

Moldovan caricaturist and illustrator

- Born: August 18, 1936; Camenca, Moldova
- Died: July 5, 2016 (aged 79); Chișinău, Moldova
- Education: Republican School of Fine Arts "I. Repin"
- Known for: Caricature, Illustration
- Notable work: "Neighbors, The Adventures of Trică and Ciupică"
- Awards: Gold Medal, Diploma of the Union of Journalists of the USSR

Alexei Grabco (August 18, 1936 – July 5, 2016) was a Moldovan caricaturist and illustrator known for his distinctive style and humorous works.

== Biography ==
Grabco was born on August 18, 1936, in Camenca, situated on the left bank of the Dniester River. He pursued his education at the Republican School of Fine Arts "I. Repin" in Chișinău from 1954 to 1957, where he interacted with notable contemporaries such as Emil Childescu, Ion Daghi, Gheorghe Munteanu, Aleksandr Hmelnițki, and Dumitru Trifan.

His debut came in 1956 when his works appeared in the magazine "Scînteia". Encouraged by fellow artist Igor Vieru, he embarked on a successful career at the magazine "Chipăruș" as an artistic editor for 25 years, spanning from 1958 to 1984. His satirical and innovative caricatures quickly gained attention and recognition for their unique style.

Grabco's caricatures often addressed social issues and found publication not only in "Chipăruș" but also in various newspapers and magazines across Moldova and the former Soviet republics. His meticulous attention to detail and artistic talent were evident in his work, which ranged from simple yet impactful pieces to intricate narratives filled with complex ideas.

His most notable contributions include the series "Neighbors" and "The Adventures of Trică and Ciupică". Additionally, he authored two collections for children during the 1960s and 1965, followed by two albums of cartoons tailored for adult audiences. Grabco's creativity extended beyond static works to animation; he played significant roles as a screenwriter, director, painter, and even cameraman for the animated film "Two Neighbors". In the 1970s and 1980s, he established his own studio, "Animafilm".

Grabco was a distinguished member of the Union of Artists of the Republic of Moldova. His contributions were acknowledged with awards such as the gold medal and Diploma of the Union of Journalists of the USSR. In 2006, he received the honorary title of "Master of Art" from the Republic of Moldova. He died on July 5, 2016, in Chișinău, leaving behind a legacy of humor and creativity.
