= Gibba =

Italian animator (1924–2018)

Gibba (pen name of Francesco Maurizio Guido; 18 December 1924 – 7 October 2018) was an Italian animator who made several erotic cartoons in the 1970s and 1980s.

He died, aged 93 on 7 October 2018 in Albenga.

== Filmography ==
- Scandalosa Gilda (1985) only the animated sequence for the erotic Italian film by Gabriele Lavia
- "E Tanta Paura" (1976) designed the erotic cartoon sequence for the giallo/poliziotteschi by Paolo Cavara. Released in the US as "Plot of Fear"
- Il Racconto della giungla (1974) Italian-Romanian co-production (with Victor Antonescu from the Romanian side), also known as Robinson Crusoe
- Il Nano e la strega (1975) - released in the U.S. as King Dick and Zi Zi Pan Pan
- L'ultimo Sciuscià (1946) - The only example of a Neorealistic Animated Film
