= Maria, Mirabela =

- Directed by: Ion Popescu-Gopo
- Written by: Ion Popescu-Gopo
- Starring: Gilda Manolescu; Medeea Marinescu; Ingrid Celia
- Cinematography: Alecu Popescu
- Edited by: Elena Belyavskaya; S. Kusursuz
- Music by: Eugen Doga
- Production companies: Moldova-Film; Soyuzmultfilm; Casa de Filme 5 Animafilm
- Release dates: 21 December 1981 (Socialist Republic of Romania); 3 March 1982 (Soviet Union)
- Running time: 68 min.
- Countries: Socialist Republic of Romania; Soviet Union
- Languages: Romanian; Russian

Maria, Mirabela is a live-action/animated film jointly produced by Romanian and Soviet movie studios. The Romanian premiere took place on 21 December 1981 in Bucharest, The Soviet premiere took place on March 3, 1982 in Moscow.

== Maria, Mirabela (1981) ==
=== Plot ===
Oache (Romanian pronunciation: [ˈo̯ake], [ˈwaki]), a frog meets old acquaintances: a butterfly, Omide (Romanian pronunciation: [omiˈde]) and a firefly, Scăpărici (Romanian pronunciation: [skəpəˈrit͡ʃʲ]). Together they watch two girls playing in a meadow, Maria and Mirabela. Oache remembers an adventure when they all first met each other, and Oache begins to tell the story.

The story begins with Oache meeting the Fairy of the Forest who stopped to drink fresh water at his spring. He is surprised to receive thanks from the Fairy for the good water and, being impressed by the visit, he asserts that frogs are not good for anything. In punishment for the lie, the Fairy of the Forest freezes Oache's legs in the stream.

Two sisters playing with a ball, Maria and Mirabela come across Oache whose legs are frozen and decide to help him. They are helped by Oache's friends, a bunch of funny frogs. They cheerfully dance and melt the ice around Oache, then the girls take Oache with the remaining ice with them. They want to go to the Fairy of the Forest to cure and release Oache.

On the way to the Fairy the girls meet other fantastic beings who need help. They meet Scăpărici, a firefly whose shoes cannot glow because when he lights them, they set on fire. Then they meet the King of Caterpillars whose daughter Omide becomes a beautiful butterfly, but she is too afraid to fly.

The girls must get to the Fairy of the Forest before midnight, but time is running out. They visit the strict Lord of Time who does not want to stop the time for them for 5 minutes, so Maria and Mirabella sing a lullaby to him so that he can fall asleep, and time can be stopped. But, the sleeping lord had his arm on Maria's dress, therefore Mirabela hurries to the fairy by herself. But when she reaches the destination, it appears that when the time stopped, the Fairy of the Forest and all of her fantastic companions, including the 4 Seasons, have fallen asleep as well.

After the time starts again the awaken Fairy is surprised to see that the old natural order has been disrupted and, as a consequence, the order of the seasons changed, Summer falling asleep near Winter. Because of that the Seasons got a serious cold, therefore the Fairy needs hot tea to cure them. But there is no water available in her kitchen. In order to prepare the medical tea to cure the sick Seasons, the Fairy gets help from the girls who run to Oache's springs. And there Oache helps them to choose the right source with the purest water. As soon as Oache understands that he can be useful, the ice on his feet thaws like magic. Maria and Mirabela then go to prepare the tea, but they have no matches to light the stove. They are helped by Scăpărici, setting fire to the stove, but his shoes start to burn. Being worried for Scăpărici, the butterfly Omide flies up and extinguishes the flames with her wings. Mirabela helped by the Fairy gives Scăpărici new shiny shoes.

The final song tells how it is fine to live when friends are near. After that it appears that the adventure was all a girls' dream, the Fairy of the Forest turns into their mother, and the Lord of Time into their father.

=== Production ===
The film starred Romanian actors Gilda Manolescu (Maria), Medeea Marinescu (Mirabela), Ingrid Celia (Fairy of the Forest) and the film director, Ion Popescu-Gopo (Lord of Time). Musical lyrics were written Grigore Vieru and translated into Russian by Valentin Berestov and Eugene Agranovici. Music was composed by Eugen Doga and performed by Romanian Radio and Television Orchestra, conducted by Cornel Popescu. The songs were sung in Romanian by Anda Călugăreanu, Mihai Constantinescu, Alexandrina Halic, Paula Radulescu, Adrian Stefanescu and Vocal Group 5T.

Gopo used 8 actors and some clay models at first. Later the models were edited from the movie and were then replaced by the animated characters. The beginning of the movie is entirely animated, but the ending is almost entirely live action.

The soundtrack of the Soviet version was authored by Dan Ionescu and Vladimir Kutuzov and character animation was done by Boris Kotov. Editors were V. Istrate, M. Gaspar, and N. Savitsev. The Russian version of the film's theme song was performed by Leonid Serebrennikov.

== Maria, Mirabela in Tranzistoria ==
The sequel of Maria, Mirabela which was produced in 1988 continues the adventures of Maria and Mirabela, this time in an imaginary world inside the TV. Along with the characters played by actors in this movie and three animated characters appear: Oache, Scăpărici and Omide, which symbolize the three vital elements of nature: water, fire and air, without which there is no life on earth. They turn into humans and are played by real actors.

The film starred Ioana Moraru, Stela Popescu, Jorj Voicu, Grigore Grigoriu, and Andrianu Kuchinska. Additional crew includes co-director Vladimir Pekar, art directors Tatyana Kolyusheva, Constantin Simionescu, and assistant art director Sergey Mavrody. The film is a Romanian-Soviet co-production made by the Romanian Casa de Filme 5 studio in collaboration with the Soviet Soyuzmultfilm animation studio.

== Awards ==
- Best music award, by composer Eugen Doga, by Filmmakers Association of Romania (ACIN), 1981
- Honorary achievement award to Alexandru Popescu, Filmmakers Association of Romania (ACIN), 1981
- Special Mention of the Jury at the 1981 Film Festival in Athens.
- Special prize and diploma in the 1982 All-Union Festival of Children's Films in Tallinn, Estonia
- The Grand prize at the Festival of Children's Films in Piatra Neamt, Romania. 1982
- Prize for the animation/live action combination at the Festival in Chicago, USA. 1984
- Honorary Mention at the Festival in Quito, Ecuador. 1986
- Prize at the International Film Festival in Giffoni, Italy. 1989
