= Plot of Fear =

- Italian film poster by Guido Crepax
- Directed by: Paolo Cavara
- Screenplay by: Bernardino Zapponi; Paolo Cavara; Enrico Oldoini
- Story by: Bernardino Zapponi; Paolo Cavara
- Produced by: Guy Luongo
- Starring: Corinne Cléry; Michele Placido; Quinto Parmeggiani; Edoardo Faieta; John Steiner; Cecilia Polizzi; Tom Skerritt; Eli Wallach
- Cinematography: Franco Di Giacomo
- Edited by: Sergio Montanari
- Music by: Daniele Patucchi
- Production companies: G.P.E. Enterprises; Centro Produzioni Cinematografiche Città di Milano
- Distributed by: Interfilm
- Release date: 1976
- Running time: 98 minutes
- Country: Italy
- Language: English

Plot of Fear (Italian: ...e tanta paura, lit. '... And Too Much Fear'), also known as Bloody Peanuts, is a 1976 Italian giallo film co-written and directed by Paolo Cavara, starring Eli Wallach and Tom Skeritt. The film also includes a well-known animated erotic insert directed by Gibba in which, as said by Marco Giusti, 'the great Gibba broke out in all kinds of sado-masochistic excesses'.

== Plot ==
Inspector Lomenzo investigates a series of murders committed against wealthy people. The inspector's sole lead is that the murderer is in the habit of leaving illustrations of the Struwwelpeter at the crime scene.

== Cast ==
- Michele Placido as Inspector Gaspare Lomenzo
- Corinne Cléry as Jeanne
- Eli Wallach as Pietro Riccio
- Tom Skerritt as Chief Inspector
- Quinto Parmeggiani as Angelo Scanavini
- Edoardo Faieta (credited as Eddy Fay) as Fulvio Colaianni
- John Steiner as Hoffmann
- Jacques Herlin as Pandolfi
- Cecilia Polizzi as Woman
- Greta Vaillant (credited as Greta Vajant) as Laura Falconieri
- Sarah Crespi (credited as Sarah Ceccarini) as Rosa Catena
- Enrico Oldoini as Lomenzo's Assistant

== See also ==
- List of Italian films of 1976
