= Dugumenu Island =

Island in Papua New Guinea

Coordinates: 8.8017°S 151.9175°E

Dugumenu Island is an island in Papua New Guinea. It is a member of the Marshall Bennett Islands and therefore belongs to Milne Bay Province. The island is about 180 hectares (440 acres) in area and uninhabited, but islanders from nearby Kwaiwatta and Gawa islands use Dugumenu for coconut production and probably fishing.
