= Lars Bloch =

Danish actor and producer (1938–2022)

Lars Bloch (6 August 1938 – 27 March 2022), was a Danish-Italian actor and producer, sometimes credited as Lars Block or Carlos Ewing.

Born in Hellerup, after military service in the Navy, Bloch moved to Italy and in the late 1950s embarked upon a prolific career as a character actor, specializing in villainous roles. In the 1980s, Bloch semi-retired from acting and later became a DVD producer and distributor of Italian films, especially Spaghetti Westerns, in Japan.

== Selected filmography ==
- The Hunchback of Rome (1960)
- La bellezza di Ippolita (1962)
- Beautiful Families (1964)
- Il disco volante (1964)
- A Stranger in Town (1966)
- The Wild Eye (1967)
- The Ravine (1969)
- The Divorce (1970)
- Long Live Robin Hood (1971)
- Alleluja & Sartana are Sons... Sons of God (1972)
- Return of Halleluja (1972)
- Heroes in Hell (1973)
- Giubbe rosse (1975)
- Who Breaks... Pays (1975)
- The Virgo, the Taurus and the Capricorn (1977)
- Fantozzi contro tutti (1980)
- Fracchia contro Dracula (1985)
