= Ion Popescu-Gopo =

Romanian graphic artist (1923–1989)

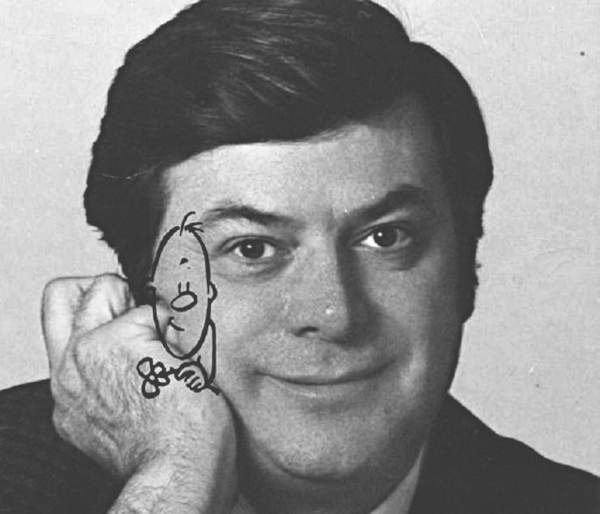
- Born: 1 May 1923; Bucharest, Kingdom of Romania
- Died: 29 November 1989 (aged 66); Bucharest, Socialist Republic of Romania
- Occupations: Graphic artist and animator

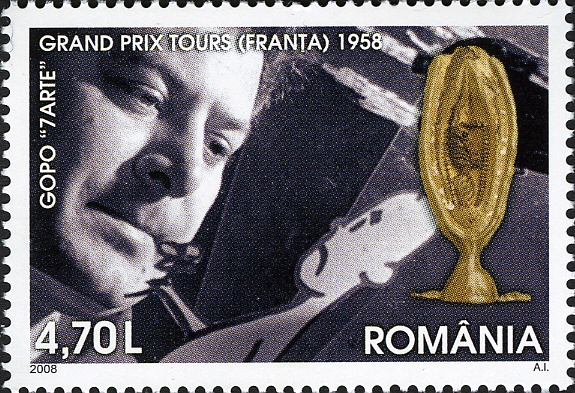
Ion Popescu Gopo on a Romanian stamp from 2008

Ion Popescu-Gopo (Romanian pronunciation: [iˈon poˈpesku ˈɡopo]; 1 May 1923 – 29 November 1989) was a Romanian graphic artist and animator, but also writer, film director, and actor.

He was born in Bucharest, Romania. He was a prominent personality in the Romanian cinematography and the founder of the modern Romanian cartoon school. He was, together with Liviu Ciulei and Mirel Ilieșiu, one of the few Romanian film artists who won an award at the Cannes Film Festival in the 20th century. His film, "Scurtă Istorie" (A Brief History), won the Short Film Palme d'Or for best short film in 1957. A few years later, his feature-length film A Bomb Was Stolen entered the 1962 Cannes Film Festival. His 1965 film, The White Moor, was entered into the 4th Moscow International Film Festival, where he won the award for Best Director. In 1969, and again in 1977 and 1983 he was a member of the jury at the 6th Moscow International Film Festival, the 10th Moscow International Film Festival. and the 13th Moscow International Film Festival.

Ion Popescu-Gopo attended (but never graduated from) the Academy of Fine Arts in Bucharest. He also attended animation courses in Moscow. He made Maria, Mirabela in 1981, which is a Romanian-Russian co-production. In 1989, he directed the film's sequel Maria, Mirabela în Tranzistoria, also a co-production with the Soviet Union.

His career started as a designer and cartoonist in 1939, publishing caricatures and editorial cartoons in newspapers. 1949 brought his debut in the film industry with "Punguța cu doi bani" (Bag with two coins). Since 1950 he started working for Studioul Cinematografic București (Cinematographic Studio Bucharest) in the animation department, that later broke into a separate animation studio, Animafilm.

His most known cartoon character is a little black and white man sometimes referred to as "Gopo's Little Man" after his creator. Later in his life Popescu-Gopo confessed that he tried to start an "anti-Disney rebellion". Unable to surpass Disney's animation characters in color and beauty, Popescu-Gopo tried to be more profound in message and substance and simplify the form and techniques used. Unlike Disney's cartoon characters, Popescu-Gopo's cartoon characters were black and white, designed in simple lines.

Ion Popescu-Gopo died in Bucharest on 29 November 1989, just weeks before the Romanian Revolution. He suffered a heart attack while trying to push his car, stuck in snow, into his garage. His death was the first step into the downfall of the Romanian animation studios Animafilm, which later suffered from financial issues after the 1989 revolution.
