= George Backhaus =

Reverend George Henry Backhaus

Orders
- Ordination: 24 August 1836 at Rome

Personal details
- Born: George Henry Backhaus; 15 February 1811 Paderborn, North Rhine-Westphalia, Germany
- Died: 7 September 1882 (aged 71) Bendigo, Victoria, Australia
- Buried: St Kilian's Church, Bendigo, Victoria, Australia
- Denomination: Catholic Church
- Occupation: Catholic priest

George Henry Backhaus (15 February 1811 – 7 September 1882) was a German-born Catholic priest in Australia.

Backhaus was born in Paderborn and was one of nine children of a boot merchant. He studied with distinction in Paderborn, going from there to Rome to study for the priesthood at the College of the Propagation of the Faith, graduating Doctor of Divinity in 1836 and being ordained on 24 August 1836. His enthusiasm for mission work took him to India, sailing from Ireland as chaplain, and later working at Berhampur in the vicariate of Bengal. He stayed there for several years and in 1841 visited Ireland, returning to India with some Loreto Sisters from Rathfarnham.

== Leaving India ==
Health problems with his liver forced him to leave India in 1846 for a cooler climate. Calling at Singapore and Batavia, he landed in Australia, spending eleven months in Sydney and finding an outlet for his musical talents with the Sydney Metropolitan Choir. Hearing that the Bishop of Adelaide was looking for a priest for the German Catholics in his diocese, Backhaus decided to fill the post. Leaving Sydney on 20 October 1847, he endured demanding conditions in Adelaide for more than four years. During this period he resolved to make the Australian mission his life work.

== Victoria goldfields ==
When many of the settlers in the area left in 1852 to seek their fortune on the Victoria goldfields, Backhaus decided to follow them there. He left Adelaide in the Marshal Bennett on 4 March and landed in Melbourne eleven days later. Once there, he volunteered to minister to the spiritual needs of the diggers. In those early months he travelled extensively from Mount Alexander, visiting the various diggings. Later, a priest was stationed at Kyneton freeing Backhaus to focus on Bendigo Creek. The first Mass site of the district was at Golden Square, but by the end of 1852 Backhaus was camping at the future location of St Kilian's Church.

== Church construction ==
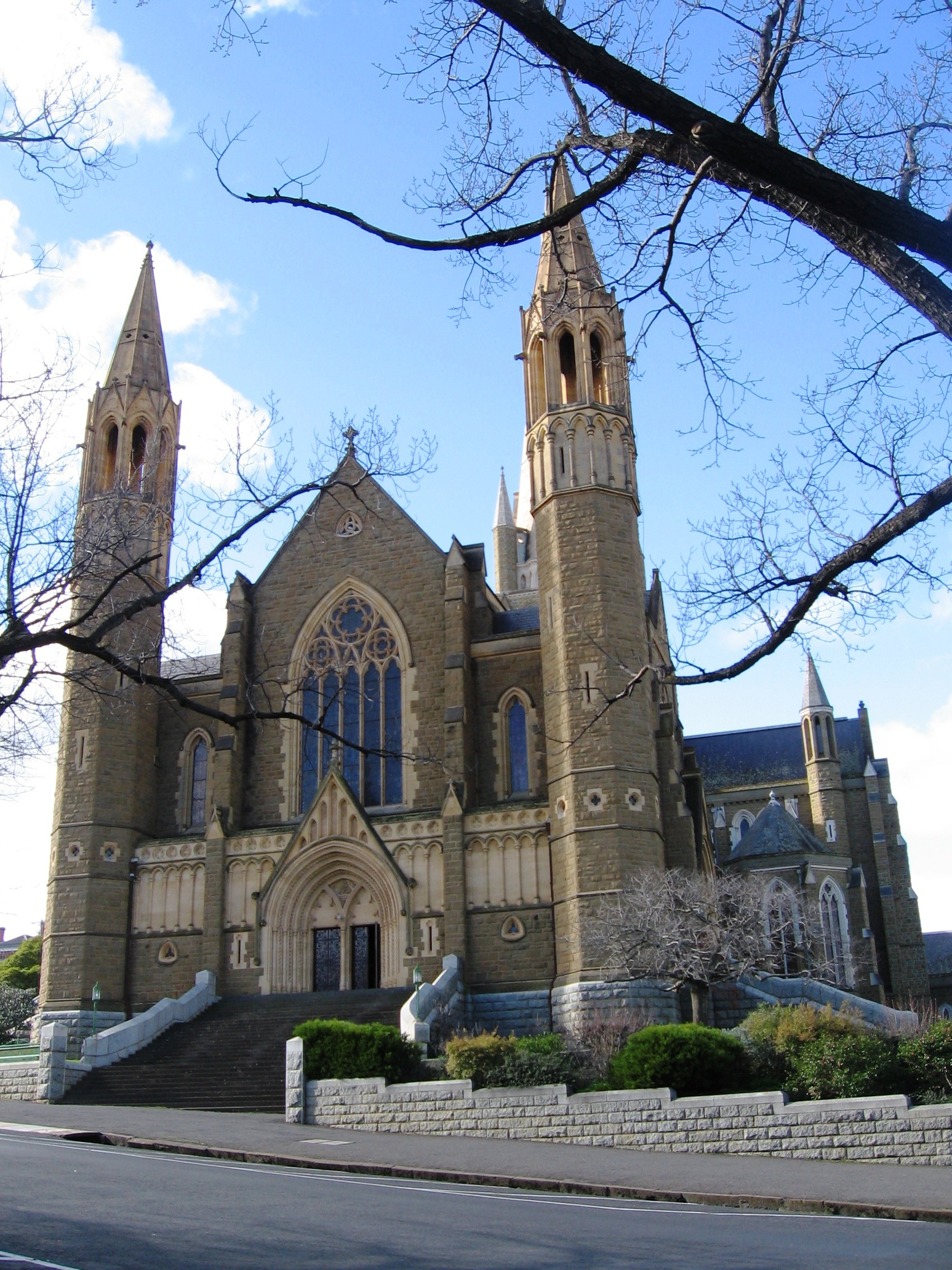
Sacred Heart Cathedral, Bendigo

When Bishop James Goold from Melbourne visited in 1855, he strongly suggested the construction of a church. Plans for a stone church were drawn up and building commenced so that it was in use in early 1858 but only completed after five more years. Knowing that most of the diggers were Irish, Backhaus dedicated the church to St Kilian, a pioneer Irish missionary in Germany and one of the patron saints of Paderborn.

== Clerical duties ==
Backhaus was diligent in his clerical duties, and played an active part in public matters - his extensive medical knowledge was frequently called upon. In 1863 he tendered his resignation and announced his return to Europe for personal reasons. A banquet was arranged in his honour. In 1866 he returned to Australia and resumed work in Adelaide. He left for Bendigo in May 1867 and some months later when it was declared a diocese, Bishop Martin Crane appointed Backhaus as his vicar-general. He gave up his parish work in 1881 and after another ceremonial farewell, retired to a house he owned at Brighton near Melbourne. In August 1882 he became gravely ill, but insisted on returning to Bendigo, where he was buried in the churchyard of St Kilian's.

== Real estate ==
He was an accomplished musician, creating some notable compositions and maintaining an excellent church choir. A sound investor, he acquired valuable properties in his early days. In 1863 he had pledged to make St Kilian's his heir, and to this end he allowed real estate worth $75,000 to appreciate over twenty years. His work and bequests made possible the construction of Bendigo's Sacred Heart Cathedral, one of Australia's largest churches and second tallest after St Patrick's Cathedral in Melbourne. It has the distinction of being the last Gothic style cathedral ever built.

== Bibliography ==
- The Enterprising Life of Dr. Henry Backhaus, Bendigo Pioneer - M. J. Nolan
