= Heroes in Hell (film) =

1974 film

- Video cover
- Directed by: Joe D'Amato
- Written by: Joe D'Amato
- Produced by: Walter Brandi
- Starring: Klaus Kinski
- Cinematography: Joe D'Amato
- Edited by: Piera Bruni; Gianfranco Simoncelli
- Music by: Vassili Kojucharov
- Distributed by: Variety Distribution
- Release date: 27 November 1974
- Running time: 90 minutes
- Country: Italy
- Language: Italian

Heroes in Hell (Italian: Eroi all'inferno) is a 1974 Italian Macaroni War film written, directed and lensed by Joe D'Amato (using the pseudonym "Michael Wotruba" for the directorial credit), produced by Walter Brandi and starring Klaus Kinski, Luciano Rossi and Franco Garofalo.

== Plot ==
A group of American POW's escape from a vile Nazi prison camp in Germany during World War II. They escape into the countryside, pursued by a squadron of Nazi soldiers assigned to recapture them. The Americans join forces with a group of French freedom fighters, and agree to help them kidnap the high-level German general Kaufmann from his chateau. Using German uniforms captured in combat, the men succeed in capturing the general, but when he puts up a fight they are forced to tranquilize him and physically carry him out of the building. The Nazi platoon catches up with them and a firefight ensues, killing almost everyone on both sides. The last surviving Americans succeed in escaping with their unconscious prisoner.

== Cast ==
- Lars Bloch as Capt. Alan Carter
- Ettore Manni as Bakara, the drunken doctor
- Klaus Kinski as SS-Brigadeführer Kaufmann
- Luciano Rossi
- George Manes as German Lt.
- Carlos Ewing
- Rosemarie Lindt as Maria
- Lu Kamante as Lt. Duncan
- Luis Joyce as Julian's Sister in Law
- Christopher Oakes as Bunny Segar
- Stan Simon as Lt. Stain
- Dick Foster as German Comandant
- Edmondo Tieghi as Pratt
- Luigi Antonio Guerra as Julian
- Roberto Dell'Acqua as Julian's Brother
- Paul Muller as German Soldier
- Attilio Dottesio
- Pietro Torrisi as Van co-driver (uncredited)

== Production ==
D'Amato had directed Kinski earlier in Death Smiles on a Murderer (1973) and said Kinski "(was) an excellent professional actor."

== Release and distribution ==
In Italy, the film received a limited regional release in very few cinemas and only for a short time, premiering on 27 November 1974. The film was shown on the Italian regional TV station Tele Video TVR on 15 November 1980.

In August 1985, the English dub Heroes in Hell was distributed by "Lightning Video" as Nr. 7502 for the price of $69.95. A VHS of the Italian dub was published by "Shendene & Moizzi" in 2000. In July 2007, Heroes in Hell was released on DVD under the title Hrdinové v pekle by the Czech label "Řitka video, s.r.o." containing both the Czech dub and the Italian dub with forced Czech subtitles. This edition was reissued by Řitka in 2009 and 2012. Also in 2007, a DVD of the English dub was released in South Africa by "Impact Video".

== Bibliography ==
- Chiti, Roberto; Poppi, Roberto; Pecorari, Mario (1991). Dizionario del cinema italiano (in Italian). Gremese Editore. p. 282. ISBN 9788876059353.
