= Edmondo Tieghi =

Italian film actor

- Born: Italy
- Occupation: Actor

Edmondo Tieghi was an Italian actor.

He appeared in Perdiamoci di vista (1994), directed by Carlo Verdone, L'avvertimento (1980) by Damiano Damiani, Le avventura di Enea (1974) by Franco Rossi, Brillantina rock by Michele Massimo Tarantini, Corte marziale (1973) by Roberto Mauri, Eroi all'inferno (1974) by Aristide Massaccesi, and Diary of a Roman Virgin (1973) by Joe D'Amato.

He played a Mexican soldier in the western film A Fistful of Dollars (1964), Nino in Rudeness (1975), and the hostage in the restaurant in Day of Violence.

== Filmography ==
=== Films ===
- A Fistful of Dollars (1964) as Mexican soldier
- For a Few Dollars More (1965) as 2nd Agua Caliente Villager watching Monco
- Duck, You Sucker (1971) as Member of firing squad
- Fra' Tazio da Velletri (1973) as Lapo De' Pazzi
- Corte marziale (1973) as Presiding Judge
- ven Nuns in Kansas City (1973) as Marrisson Right Hand
- Diary of a Roman Virgin (1973) as Conspirator
- Day of Violence (1977) as Nonno
- El hampa ataca, la policía responde (1977) as Biondo
- Contrólese soldado (1977)
- Il giorno dei cristalli (1978) as Padre Ernesto
- La Cage aux Folles (1978)
- Aspetterò (1978) as Addetto reception
- Deadly Chase (1978) as Civetta
- Brillantina Rock (1979)
- The Warning (1980)
- The Fascist Jew (1980)
- Storia senza parole (1981)
- Il piacere dell'onestà (1982) as Marchetto Fongi
- Il passo falso (1983)
- Caligula's Slaves (1984)
- Uomo contro uomo (1987) as Avvocato Arcuzio
- Perdiamoci di vista (1994) as Arianna's father
- Ustica: una spina nel cuore (2000) as Mr.Kappa
- Soldiers, la historia de Kosovo (2001) as Zoran Jukovic
- L'altra donna (2002)

=== TV series ===
- La Eneida (1971−1972) as Acate
- Nucleo centrale investigativo (1974) as Magnaghi
- Heroes in Hell (1974) as Julian
- La mafia mi fa un baffo (1974)
- How Wonderful to Die Assassinated (1975) as Congiurato
- El genio (1975)
- Rudeness (1975)
- Qui squadra mobile (1976) as Uomo della Lotus
- Il commissario De Vincenzi 2 (1977) as Tecnico
- The Last Three Days (1977) as Un fascista
- La riva di Charleston (1978)
- I racconti fantastici di Edgar Allan Poe (1979) as Lionel
- El capitán Maffei (1985)
- Mino (1986) as Gen. Diaz
- Piazza Navona (1988)

== Bibliography ==
- Chiti, Roberto; Poppi, Roberto; Pecorari, Mario (1991). Dizionario del cinema italiano. Gremese Editore. p. 428. ISBN 9788876059353.
- Curti, Roberto (28 September 2013). Italian Crime Filmography, 1968-1980. McFarland Publishing. p. 332. ISBN 9781476612089.
