= Dniester Sanatorium =

Coordinates: 48.03437227913074°N 28.682308702508244°E

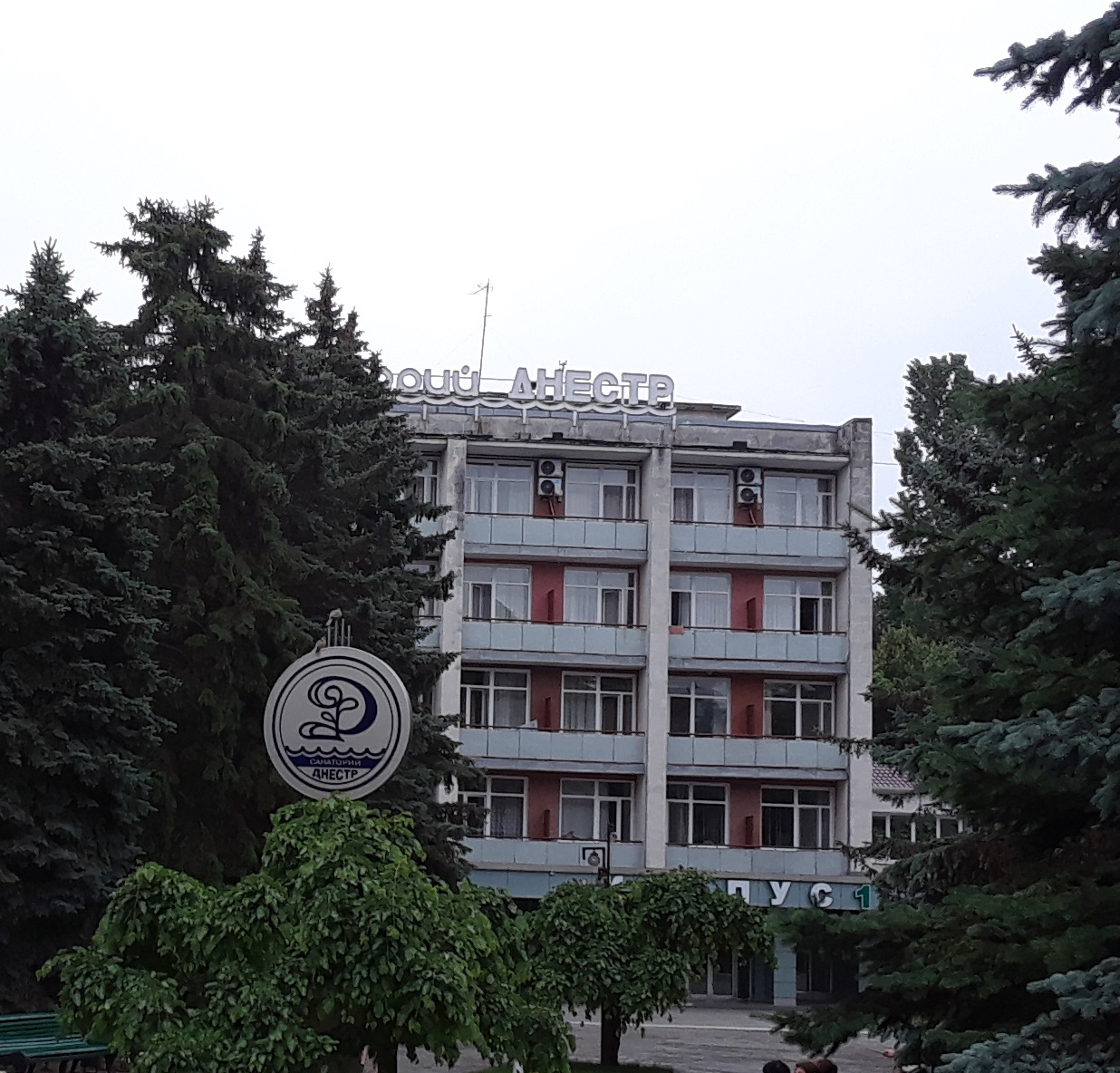
Dniester Sanatorium

The Dniester Sanatorium (Russian: Ка́менский санато́рий «Днестр», romanized: Kamensky sanatory "Dnestr") is a health resort in Camenca, Transnistria, Moldova. Founded immediately after World War II, in what was then the Moldavian SSR, the sanatorium is located on the banks of the Dniester river in the North of region, near the town of Camenca. It offers therapeutic treatment, most notably ampelotherapy which is described as treatment by grape juice and wine. The resort includes a large cinema, a library and other recreational facilities.
