= Iwa Island =

Island in Papua New Guinea

Coordinates: 8.704°S 151.675°E

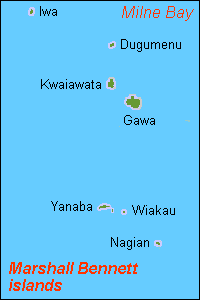
Marshall Bennett Islands

Iwa Island is an island located in the Solomon Sea, approximately 130 miles (200 km) from mainland New Guinea and 310 miles (500 km) from Port Moresby. It is part of the Marshall Bennett Islands group and considered part of Papua New Guinea.

The island is featured briefly in the 1963 documentary "La Donna Nel Mondo (Women of the World)." At that time, it was home to a retired Scottish colonel, Roger Hopkins, his 84 wives, and their 52 children. It is stated that his wives were 13–18 years of age. Hopkins, much older than his wives, was said to be unintelligible as he was both deaf and mute — although he is wearing a hearing aid in his right ear during filming. He is seen smoking tobacco from a pipe and wearing worn-out Western clothing, but otherwise there appear to be no objects of Western origin on the island.

According to the population census of 2000, Iwa Island had a population of 766, making it the second most populous island of the Marshall Bennett Islands, after Gawa Island. Obomatu Village is located on Iwa Island.
