= Black Belly of the Tarantula =

1971 film by Paolo Cavara

- Theatrical release poster
- Italian: La tarantola dal ventre nero
- Directed by: Paolo Cavara
- Screenplay by: Lucile Laks
- Story by: Marcello Danon
- Produced by: Marcello Danon
- Starring: Giancarlo Giannini; Claudine Auger; Barbara Bouchet; Rossella Falk; Silvano Tranquilli; Annabella Incontrera; Ezio Marano; Barbara Bach; Stefania Sandrelli; Giancarlo Prete; Anna Saia
- Cinematography: Marcello Gatti
- Edited by: Mario Morra
- Music by: Ennio Morricone
- Production companies: Da.Ma. Produzione; Production Artistique et Cinématographique
- Distributed by: Cinema International Corporation (Italy); Metro-Goldwyn-Mayer (international)
- Release dates: 4 September 1971 (Italy); 19 July 1972 (France)
- Running time: 98 minutes
- Countries: Italy; France
- Language: Italian

Black Belly of the Tarantula (Italian: La tarantola dal ventre nero) is a 1971 giallo film directed by Paolo Cavara and starring Giancarlo Giannini, Barbara Bouchet and Barbara Bach.

== Plot ==
Maria is interrupted during a massage by her angry husband, Paolo. He has proof that she has been unfaithful to him, though she denies it. That night, an individual dressed in black and wearing surgical gloves brutally murders Maria in her home after injecting her with a chemical that leaves her paralyzed but still conscious. The next day, the inspector assigned to the case, Tellini, questions Paolo. The police find a picture of Maria being caressed by a man's hand, but his identity is unknown because half the picture is missing. At home that night, Tellini confesses to his artist wife, Anna, that he does not feel cut out for homicide investigations.

The killer strikes again, this time murdering a clothing store owner with no connection to Maria. Tellini continues to investigate the crime and trace the needles used in the crime to a local doctor. The doctor protests his innocence, and when Tellini leaves the office, he is accosted by Paolo. Paolo too insists he is innocent and plans to conduct his own investigation. Tellini visits a scientist acquaintance of the second victim, who demonstrates that a species of wasp will use a toxin to paralyze and eviscerate a tarantula to lay its eggs in the corpse. Tellini has the scientist arrested on drug possession charges.

Laura, who owns the spa that Maria patronized the day of her death, phones Mario, who was Maria's lover in the picture. He and Laura take photos of lovers to blackmail them, and she tells him to deliver the last batch of photos of Maria's indiscretions to a woman named Franca. When Mario goes to deliver the package, Tellini and Paolo (who is now working with Tellini) chase him. After a brief struggle with Mario on the rooftop of a building, Paolo falls to his death, and Mario is then run down by a car in the street below. Shortly after being interviewed by Tellini, Franca is murdered in her apartment. Tellini is ridiculed by his colleagues after a tape of him and his wife having sex is found at Mario's house, prompting Tellini to again consider leaving the force. However, when he is nearly killed in a staged automobile accident, he realizes he needs to solve at least this one last crime.

One of Laura's spa employees, Jenny, resigns in protest of the blackmail ring. Laura obliquely threatens her life, but their conversation is interrupted by the spa's blind masseur. Jenny spends the night at a friend's house but is followed by the killer who brutally murders her, leaving her body in a trash bag to be found the following day. Tellini interviews some of Jenny's co-workers, including the aloof Laura, a nurse who wears gloves identical to the killer's, and the blind masseur, who takes off his darkened glasses to reveal colorless, unseeing eyes.

That night, Laura telephones Tellini to inform him that she has uncovered the killer's identity. But when he goes to the spa, he finds her murdered, with a white contact lens next to her body. Realizing the masseur had been faking his blindness and was indeed the killer, Tellini races home to find the killer attacking Anna. The men struggle, and Tellini subdues him and saves Anna. The next day, a psychiatrist tells Tellini that the masseur had begun faking his sightlessness after killing his unfaithful, sexually voracious wife five years earlier; he then continued to kill to satisfy his inner demons. Satisfied at solving the case but still disillusioned with police work, Tellini wanders the crowded streets of Rome.

== Cast ==
- Giancarlo Giannini as Inspector Tellini
- Claudine Auger as Laura
- Barbara Bouchet as Maria Zani
- Rossella Falk as Franca Valentino
- Silvano Tranquilli as Paolo Zani
- Annabella Incontrera as Mirta Ricci
- Ezio Marano as Masseur
- Barbara Bach as Jenny
- Stefania Sandrelli as Anna Tellini
- Giancarlo Prete as Mario
- Anna Saia as Maria's friend
- Eugene Walter (credited as Walter Eugene) as Ginetto, the waiter
- Nino Vingelli as Inspector Di Giacomo

== Production ==
=== Filming ===
The film was shot on location in Rome, Italy, in 1971.

=== Music ===
Ennio Morricone did the music score for the film.

== Release ==
=== Home media ===
Blue Underground Entertainment released the film on DVD in 2006. A 3-disc 4K UHD and Blu-ray Limited Edition, featuring a new 4K transfer from the original camera negative, is scheduled for release by Celluloid Dreams in May 2026.

=== Legacy ===
Black Belly of the Tarantula is one of many Italian giallo films to be inspired by Dario Argento's successful debut thriller The Bird with the Crystal Plumage (1970). Though fairly obscure for many years, the film has recently made a comeback thanks to the rising fan base for the giallo genre. The film has gained much praise from the horror community, with one writer at Horrorview.com citing it as the best giallo ever made.

== Sources ==
- Bondanella, Peter (2009). A History of Italian Cinema. New York: Continuum. pp. 389–90. ISBN 978-0-826-41785-5.
- Luther-Smith, Adrian (1999). Blood & Black Lace: The Definitive Guide to Italian Sex and Horror Movies. Liskeard: Stray Cat Publishing Ltd. p. 9. ISBN 978-0-9533261-1-2.
