= The Ravine =

- Directed by: Paolo Cavara
- Screenplay by: Paolo Cavara
- Story by: Paolo Cavara; John Crawford
- Produced by: Richard Irving Marx
- Starring: David McCallum; Nicoletta Machiavelli; Lars Bloch
- Cinematography: Tomislav Pinter
- Edited by: Carlo Reali
- Music by: Riz Ortolani
- Production companies: Francesca Film; Jadran Films; Group W Films
- Distributed by: Metro-Goldwyn-Mayer; Variety Distribution
- Release date: 7 November 1969
- Running time: 97 minutes
- Countries: Italy; Yugoslavia; United States
- Languages: Italian; English

The Ravine (Italian: La cattura) is a 1969 Italian-Yugoslav-American war drama film written and directed by Paolo Cavara and starring David McCallum, Nicoletta Machiavelli and John Crawford.

== Plot ==
The story takes place in winter, during World War II, at an isolated, snowed-in area. This area is occupied by Germany but contested by partisans who have Russian backing.

One of the local partisans is Anja Kovach. Her entire family was executed in retaliation for the death of a single German. She survived and, eventually, joined the partisans. She has become renowned as a sniper. She has killed almost half the local German garrison. The German troops live in fear of her.

Sergeant Stephen Holmann is an expert sniper in the German army. Before the war, he worked as a teacher. He attended the 1936 Olympics, an expert in marksmanship and a hunter. He gets reassigned from North Africa, and parachuted into the area, for a special assignment: to capture Anja. He must not kill her, lest she become a martyr.

For several days, Stephen and Anja stalk each other through snow and woods. Eventually, Stephen wins: he manages to capture Anja, whilst she is occupied with signalling a Russian supply plane.

Simultaneously, a fierce battle erupts between Germans and partisans. The battle moves away, leaving Stephen and Anja alone, without supplies, and surrounded by dead bodies.

Stephen, with Anja his captive, is forced to find shelter and food, in hopes that the German forces will prevail and return. As days pass, Stephen and Anja's relationship evolves from adversarial to cooperative. They become lovers.

Subsequently, the battle returns to the area. Amidst flying bullets, Stephen returns Anja's rifle to her. They go in opposite directions but a German soldier spots Anja and kills her. Stephen sees this, and kills the soldier. A Russian soldier sees Stephen heading toward Anja and assumes he has shot her, and in retaliation, kills Stephen.

== Cast ==
- David McCallum as Sergeant Stephen Holmann
- Nicoletta Machiavelli as Anja Kovach
- John Crawford as Captain Keller
- Lars Bloch as Lt. Alexei Soloviev
- Demeter Bitenc as Lt. Eisgruber
- Lewis W. Bushnell as Corporal Busch
- Tana Mascarelli as First Old Woman
- Ivona Petri as Second Old woman
- Branko Špoljar as Thin Soldier
- Mirko Boman as Tall Soldier
- Rikard Brzeska as Old Soldier
- Radko Polič as First Soldier
