= The Wild Eye =

1967 Italian film

- French film poster
- Directed by: Paolo Cavara
- Written by: Paolo Cavara
- Produced by: Georges Marci
- Starring: Philippe Leroy
- Music by: Gianni Marchetti
- Release date: 31 August 1967
- Running time: 98 minutes
- Country: Italy
- Language: Italian

The Wild Eye (Italian: L'occhio selvaggio) is a 1967 Italian drama film directed by Paolo Cavara. It was entered into the 5th Moscow International Film Festival.

== Cast ==
- Philippe Leroy as Paolo
- Delia Boccardo as Barbara Bates
- Gabriele Tinti as Valentino
- Giorgio Gargiullo as Rossi
- Luciana Angiolillo as Mrs. Davis
- Lars Bloch as John Bates
- Gianni Bongioanni as The Hunter
- Tullio Marini as Ruggero
