= Camenca =

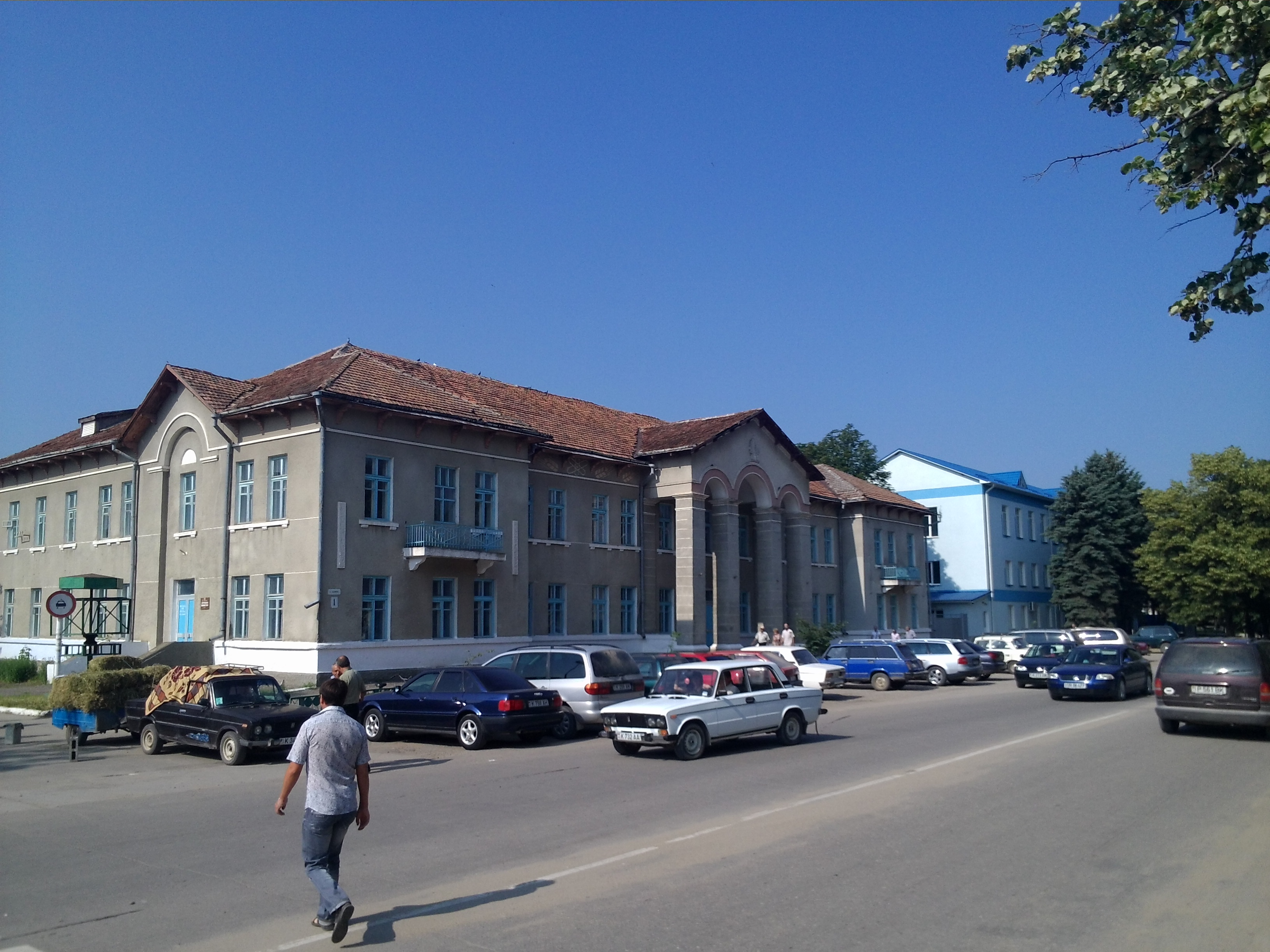

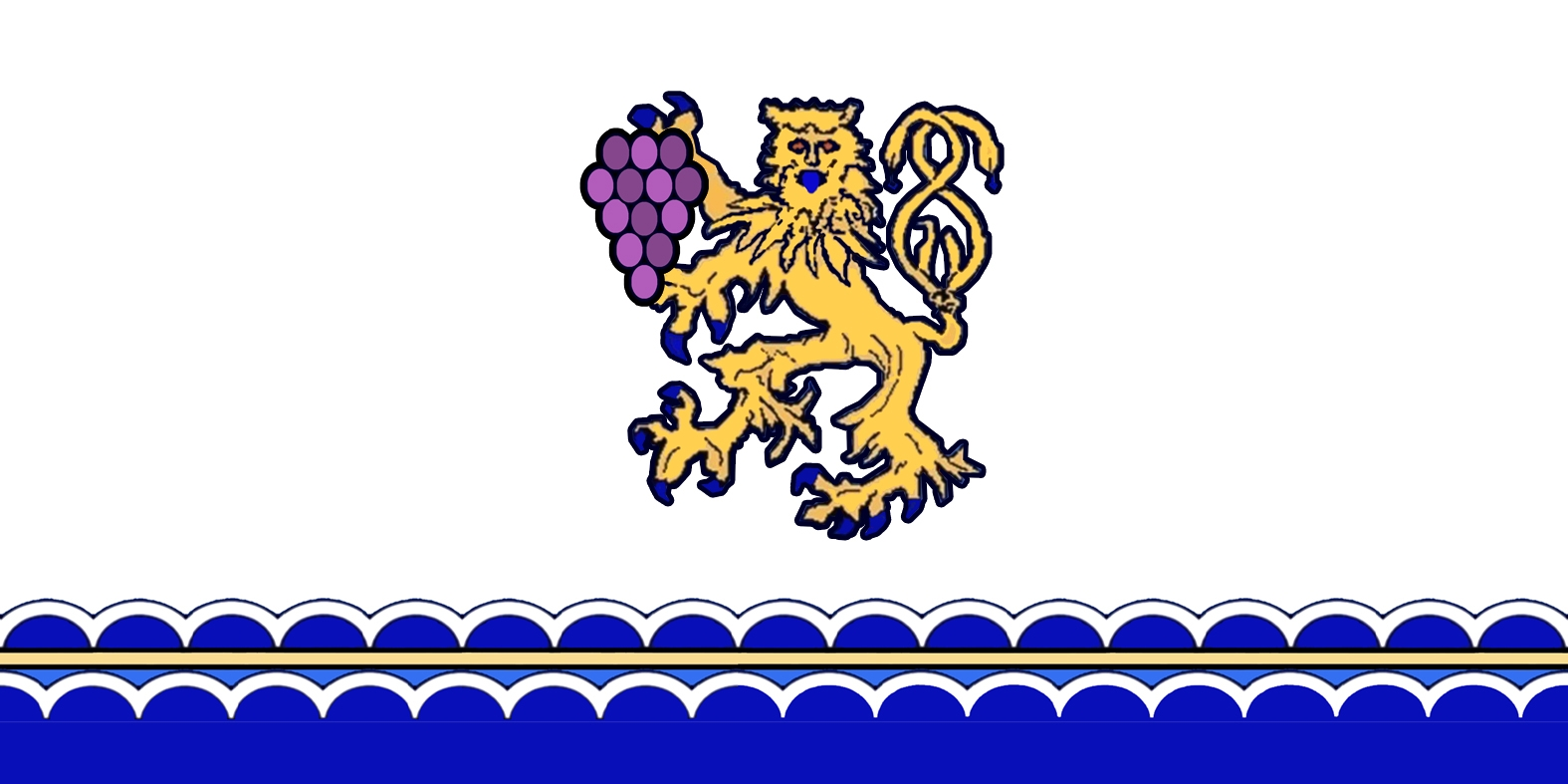
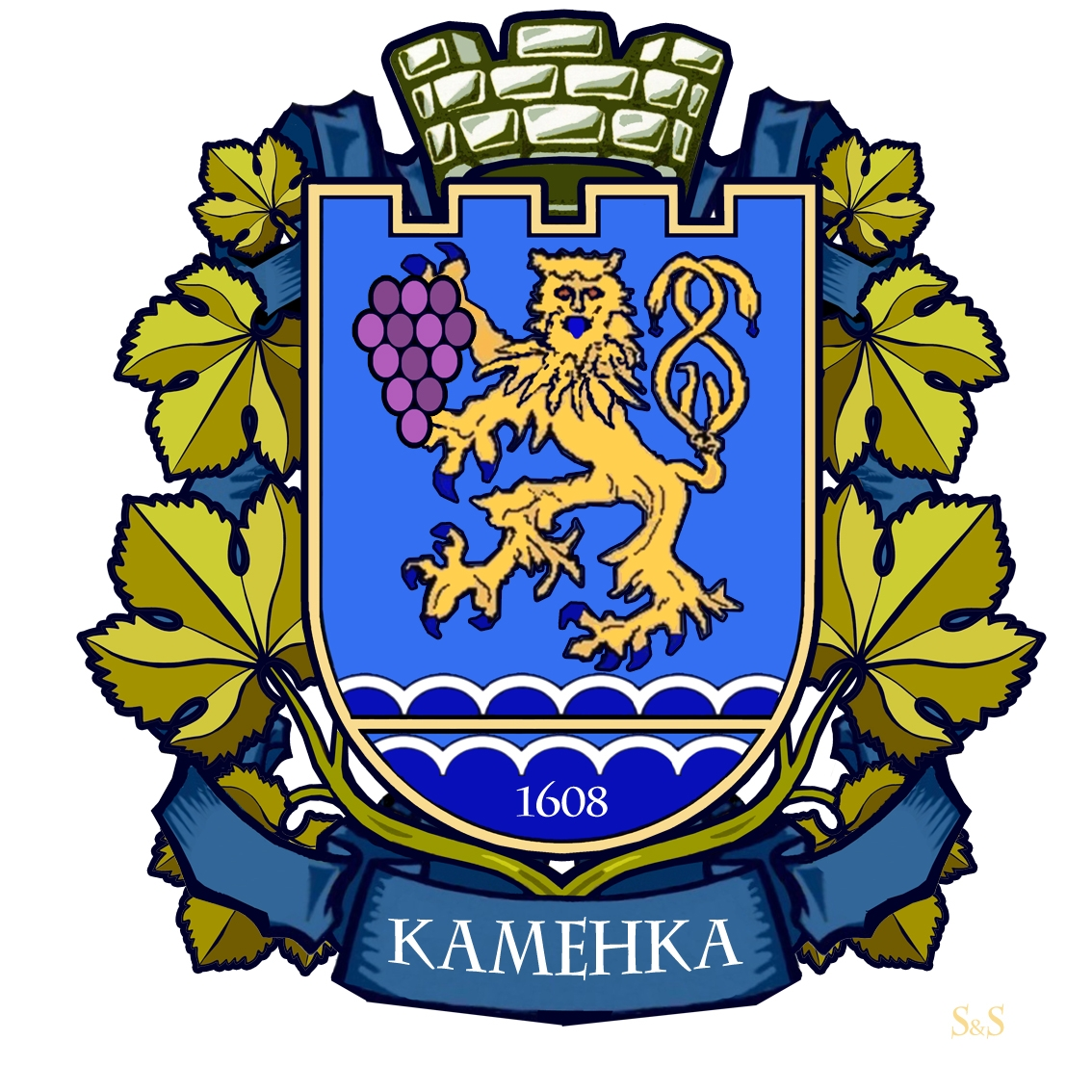
- Flag Coat of arms

- Location within Moldova Location within Transnistria
- Coordinates: 48°01′N 28°43′E
- Country (de jure): Moldova
- Country (de facto): Transnistria (Note: Transnistria's political status is disputed. It considers itself to be an independent state, but this is not recognised by any UN member state. The Moldovan government and the international community consider Transnistria a part of Moldova's territory.)

Population (2019)
  - Total: 8,705
- Time zone: UTC+2 (EET)
- Climate: Dfb
- Website: camenca.gospmr.org

Camenca (Romanian: Camenca [ˈkameŋka], Moldovan Cyrillic: Каменка; Russian: Каменка, romanized: Kamenka; Ukrainian: Кам'янка, romanized: Kamyanka) is a town in Transnistria, a breakaway republic internationally recognized as part of Moldova. It is composed of the town itself and the village of Solnecinoe. Camenca is the seat of Camenca District. The town is located on the Dniester, in the north of Transnistria.

The mayor is Pyotr Mustya.

== History ==
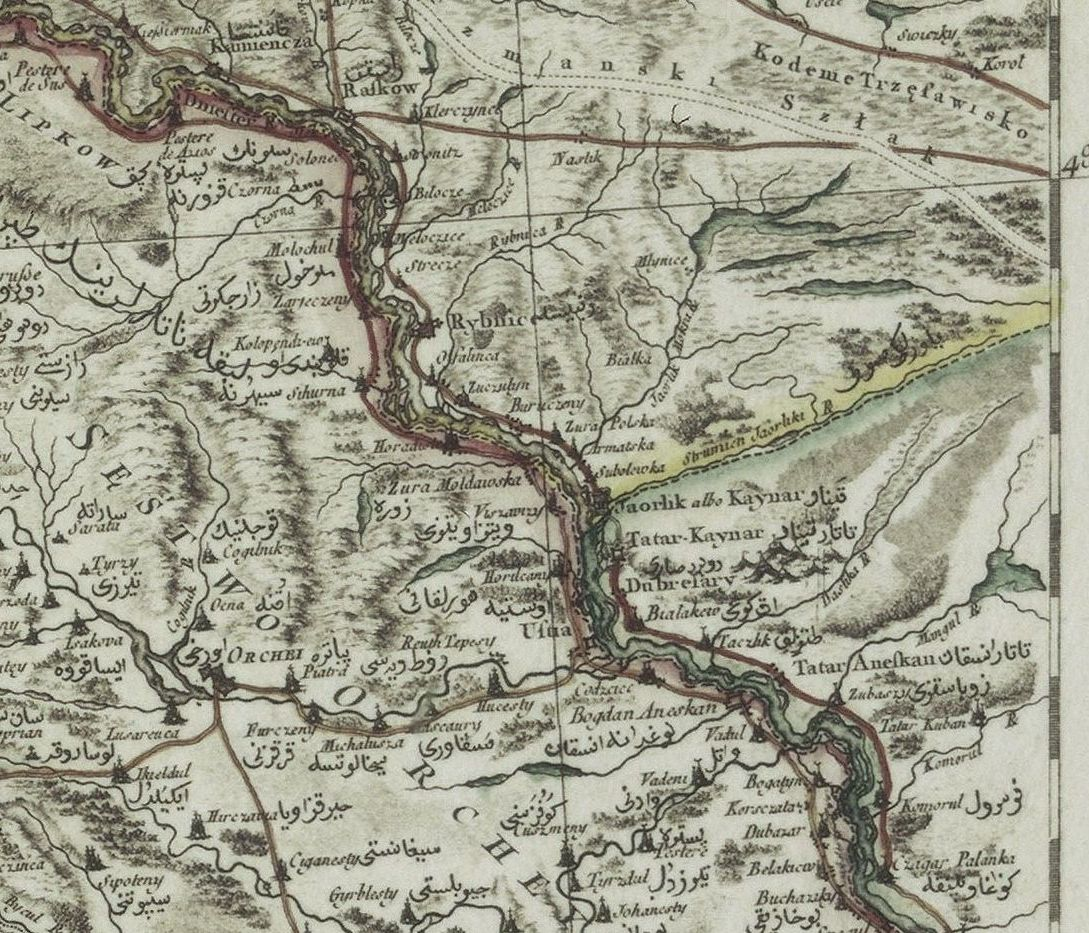
Fragment of a map of Poland from 1772 with Kamiencza marked

The settlement was founded in 1609, when it was part of the Kingdom of Poland. In 1672 it fell to the Ottoman Empire, but was regained by Poland in 1699. Kamionka, as it was known in Polish, was a private village of the Lubomirski family, administratively located in the Bracław County in the Bracław Voivodeship in the Lesser Poland Province. Following the Second Partition of Poland, in 1793, it was annexed by Russia.

The town became part of Soviet Ukraine in 1920 and was incorporated into the Moldavian Autonomous Oblast in 1924, which was reorganized later that year as the Moldavian Autonomous Soviet Socialist Republic. In 1940, following the Soviet occupation of Bessarabia and Northern Bukovina, Camenca became part of the newly created Moldavian Soviet Socialist Republic. After the Axis invasion of the Soviet Union in June 1941, Romanian and German forces occupied the area, and Camenca was incorporated into the Romanian-administered Transnistria Governorate, where it remained until the return of Soviet forces in 1944.

=== Jewish history ===
Camenca, known to its Jewish inhabitants as Kamenka, had a substantial Jewish community by the nineteenth century. In the Russian imperial census of 1897, 2,902 of the town's 6,746 inhabitants were Jews. Commerce and crafts played an important role in the community's economic life, and a 1913 business directory recorded four Jewish prayer houses in the town. The community also maintained a Jewish cemetery, with burials dating to at least the nineteenth century.

Under Soviet rule, the Jewish population declined. In 1939, 1,283 Jews lived in Camenca, comprising 17.4 percent of the town's population. Some Jewish residents were mobilized into the Red Army following the German invasion of the Soviet Union in June 1941, while others evacuated eastward before Axis forces reached the town.

=== The Holocaust ===
Romanian forces entered Camenca on 23–24 July 1941. During their arrival, dozens of Jews were shot near the town's fire station, after which the remaining Jewish population was confined in a ghetto. Jews displaced from other localities were also brought to Camenca. Prisoners were guarded by Romanian gendarmes and local police and were subjected to forced labour, robbery, beatings and killings.

During late 1941 and early 1942, groups of Jews were regularly removed from the ghetto and murdered. Some victims were taken to the Dniester, shot or drowned in the river. Survivor Esiah Kleiman, who was confined in Camenca during 1941, recalled that Jews taken out for forced labour were sometimes drowned in the Dniester at the end of the working day. More than 1,000 Jews were killed in Camenca and the surrounding district during the occupation.

The ghetto was liquidated in early 1942. Its prisoners were assembled in the town centre; Jews who were unable to walk were taken to the Dniester and killed, while the others were marched toward Rîbnița. Many were subsequently transferred farther into Romanian-administered Transnistria, where large numbers were murdered or died from the conditions of detention.

== Demographics ==
Historical population
Year	Pop.	±%
1989	13,689	—
2004	10,323	−24.6%
2014	8,871	−14.1%

According to the 2004 Census in Transnistria, the town itself has 10,323 inhabitants, including 5,296 Moldovans (51.3%), 3,476 Ukrainians (33.67%), 1,305 Russians (12.64%), 61 Belarusians, 42 Poles, 35 Bulgarians, 32 Gagauzes, 23 Germans, 10 Armenians, 8 Jews, 3 Gypsies and 32 others.

== Climate ==
Climate data for Camenca (1991–2020, extremes 1951–2021)
Month	Jan	Feb	Mar	Apr	May	Jun	Jul	Aug	Sep	Oct	Nov	Dec	Year
Record high °C (°F)	14.9 (58.8)	21.1 (70.0)	26.1 (79.0)	31.2 (88.2)	34.9 (94.8)	38.2 (100.8)	41.5 (106.7)	39.7 (103.5)	38.3 (100.9)	31.0 (87.8)	25.0 (77.0)	17.4 (63.3)	41.5 (106.7)
Mean daily maximum °C (°F)	0.5 (32.9)	2.7 (36.9)	9.1 (48.4)	16.9 (62.4)	22.7 (72.9)	26.2 (79.2)	28.4 (83.1)	28.3 (82.9)	22.5 (72.5)	15.0 (59.0)	7.7 (45.9)	1.9 (35.4)	15.2 (59.4)
Daily mean °C (°F)	−2.7 (27.1)	−1.2 (29.8)	3.7 (38.7)	10.7 (51.3)	16.3 (61.3)	19.9 (67.8)	21.8 (71.2)	21.3 (70.3)	16.1 (61.0)	9.7 (49.5)	4.0 (39.2)	−1.1 (30.0)	9.9 (49.8)
Mean daily minimum °C (°F)	−5.6 (21.9)	−4.4 (24.1)	−0.5 (31.1)	5.0 (41.0)	10.1 (50.2)	13.9 (57.0)	15.6 (60.1)	14.9 (58.8)	10.4 (50.7)	5.2 (41.4)	1.1 (34.0)	−3.8 (25.2)	5.1 (41.2)
Record low °C (°F)	−32.8 (−27.0)	−27.4 (−17.3)	−23.4 (−10.1)	−13.4 (7.9)	−2.6 (27.3)	3.1 (37.6)	7.4 (45.3)	3.9 (39.0)	−5.1 (22.8)	−8.8 (16.2)	−19.2 (−2.6)	−28.7 (−19.7)	−32.8 (−27.0)
Average precipitation mm (inches)	33 (1.3)	30 (1.2)	33 (1.3)	40 (1.6)	57 (2.2)	71 (2.8)	72 (2.8)	51 (2.0)	49 (1.9)	38 (1.5)	39 (1.5)	34 (1.3)	547 (21.4)
Average precipitation days (≥ 1.0 mm)	7	6	7	6	8	8	7	5	6	5	6	7	77
Average relative humidity (%)	83	81	76	65	63	67	67	66	69	75	83	86	74
Source 1: NOAA
Source 2: Serviciul Hidrometeorologic de Stat (extremes, relative humidity)

== Notable people ==
- Nicolae Coval (1904–1970), Soviet Moldavian politician, prime minister of the Moldavian SSR from 1945 to 1946
- Alexei Grabco (1936–2016), Soviet and Moldovan caricaturist
- Vadim Hranovschi (born 1983), Moldovan discus thrower
- Oleg Khorzhan (1976–2023), Transnistrian lawyer and politician

== Gallery ==
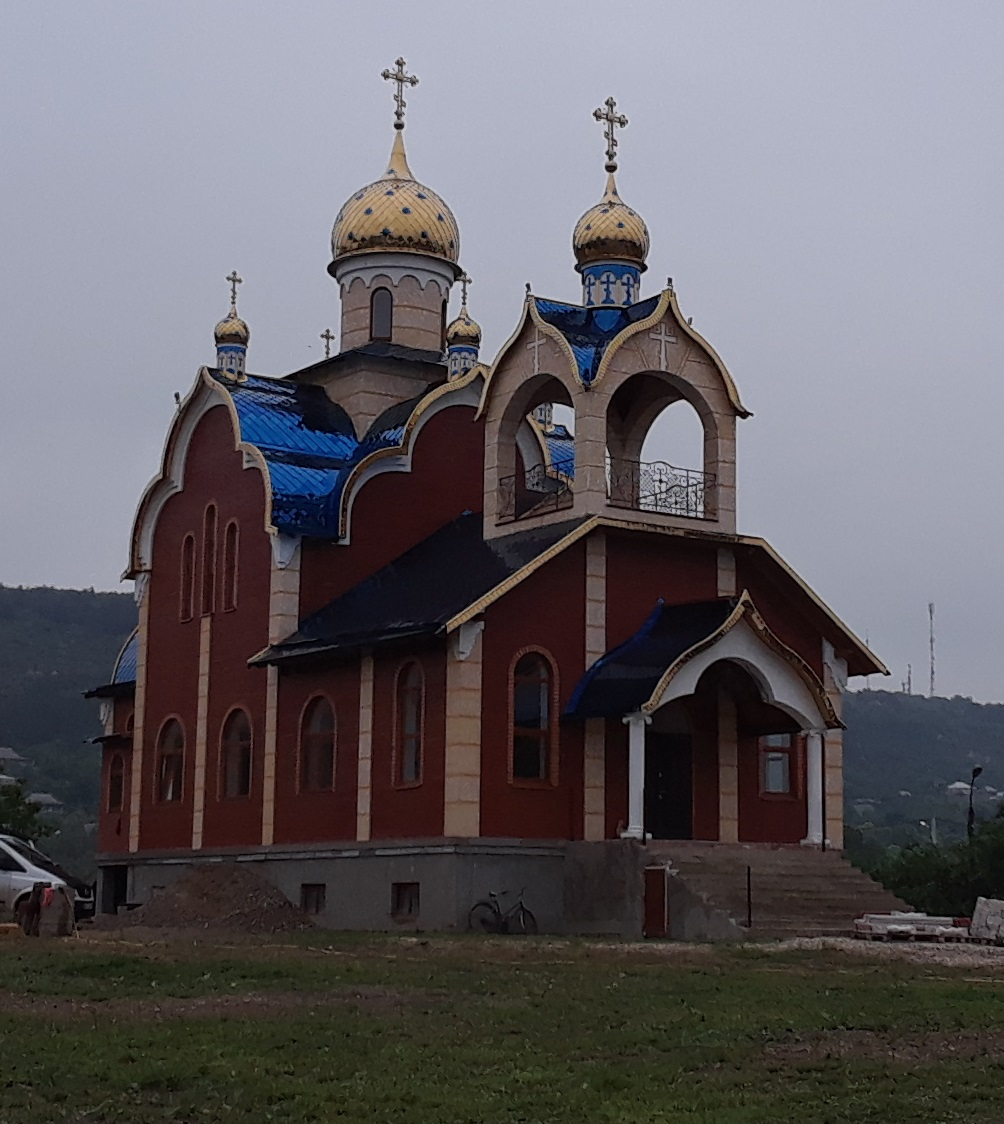
Dormition of the Theotokos Church

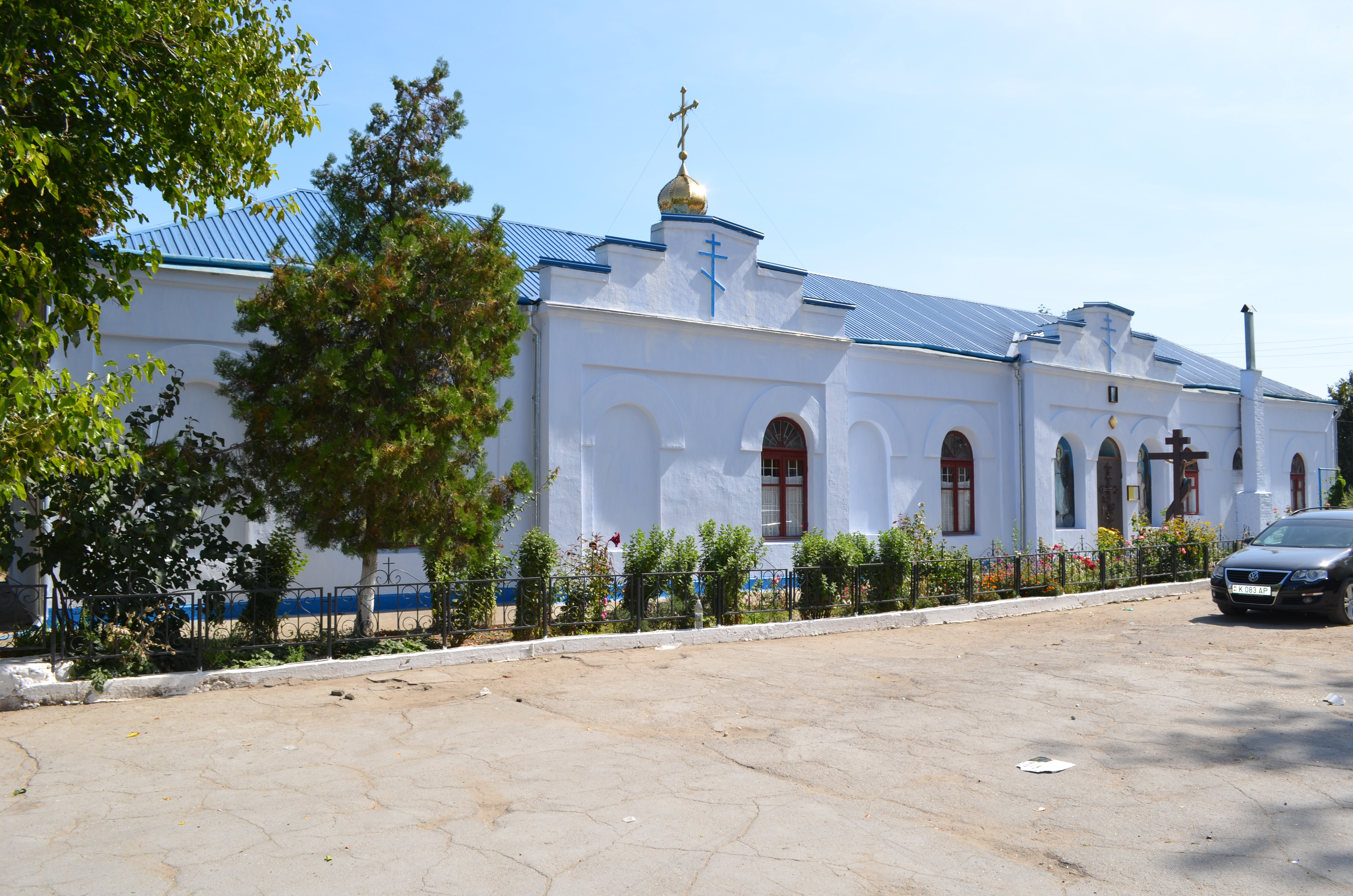
Church

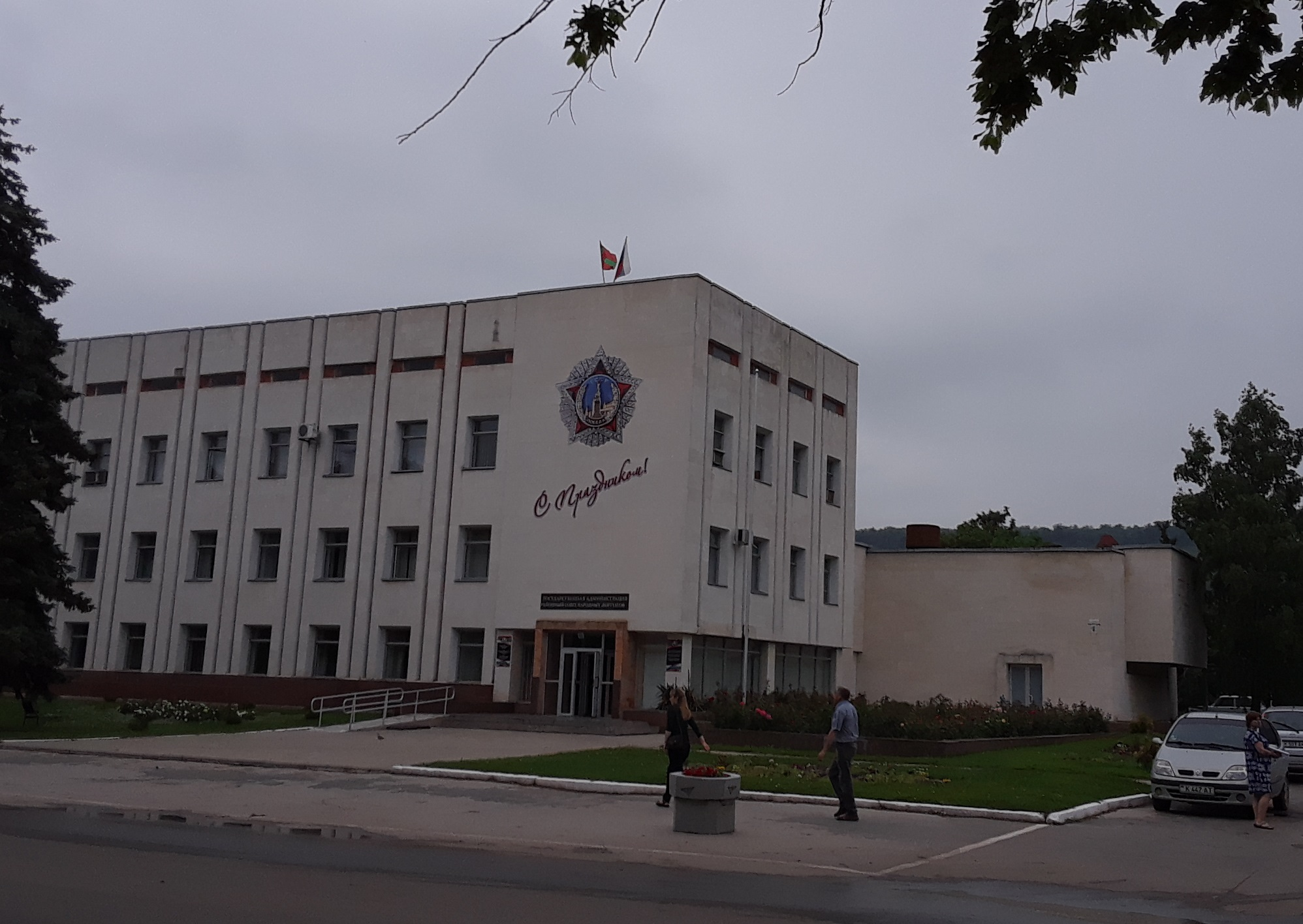
Administrative building

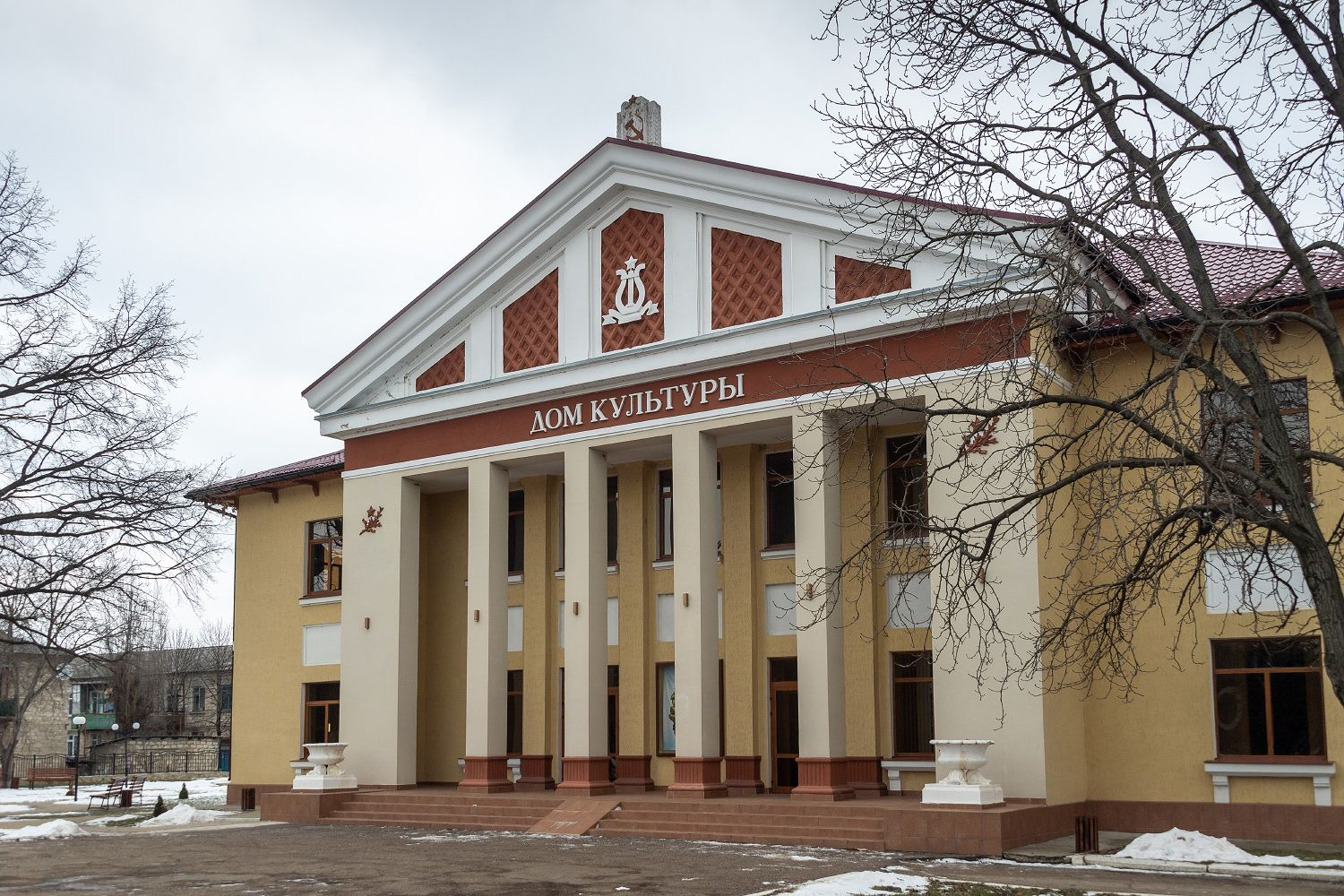
House of culture

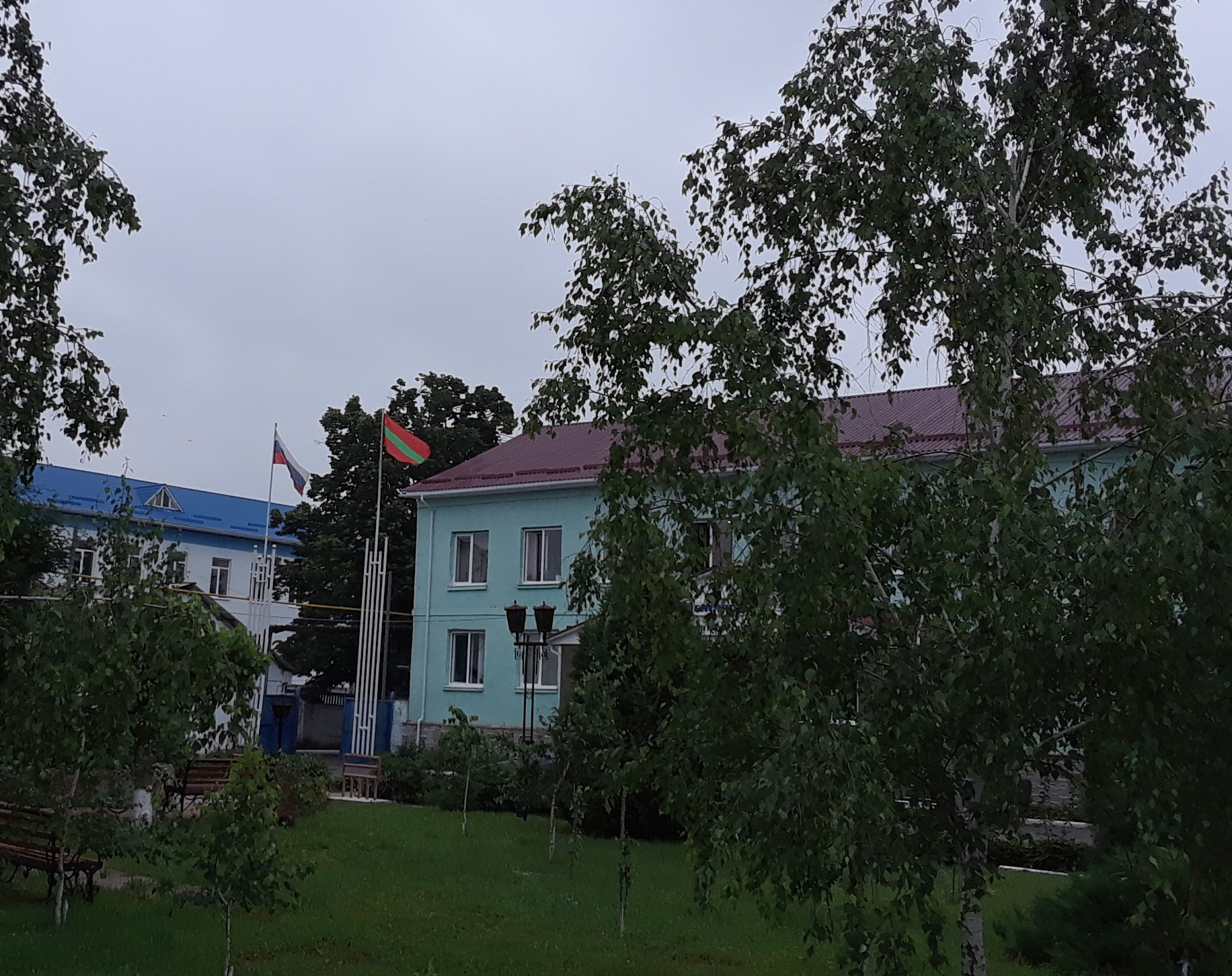
Police station

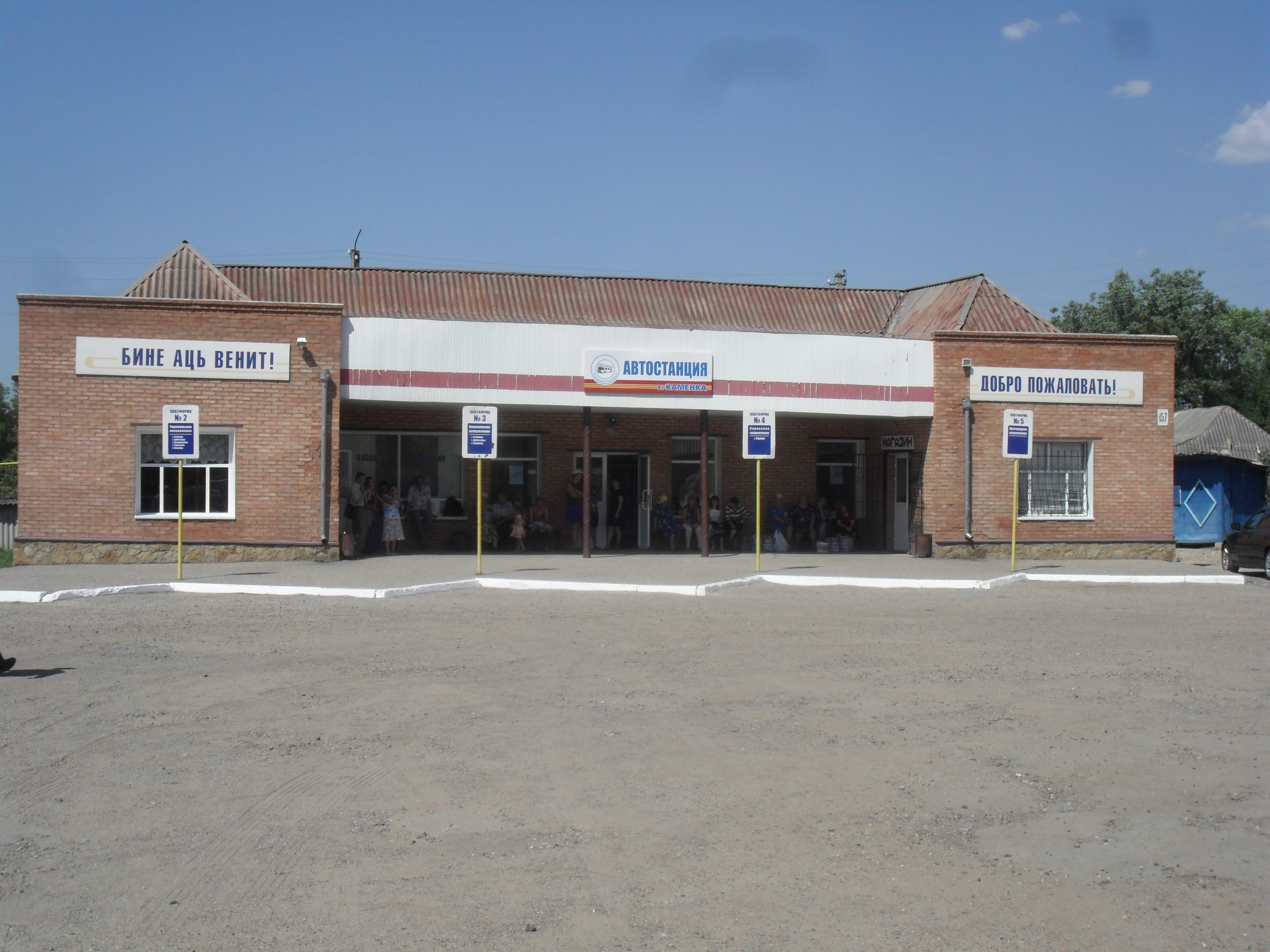
Bus station

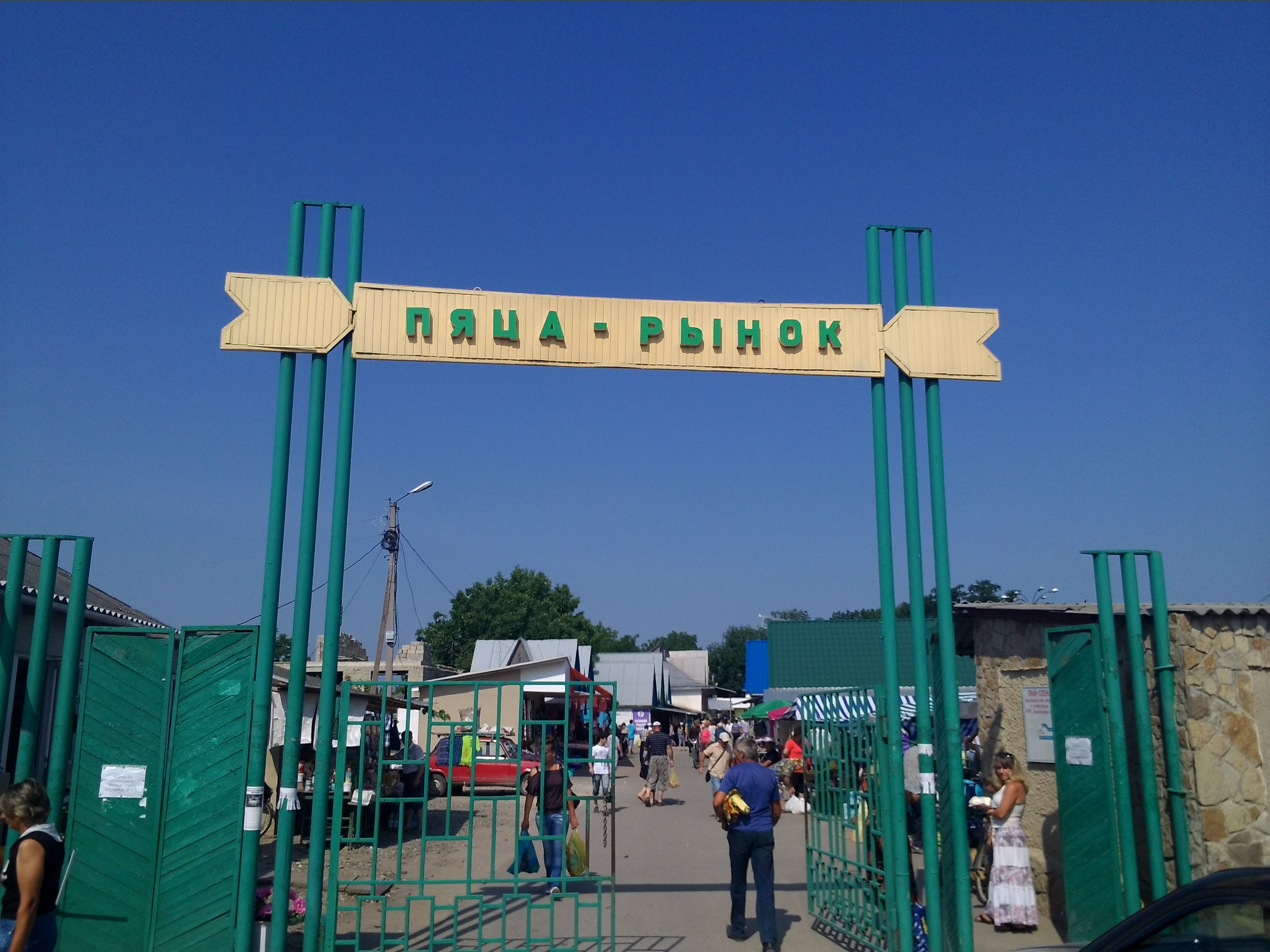
Central market

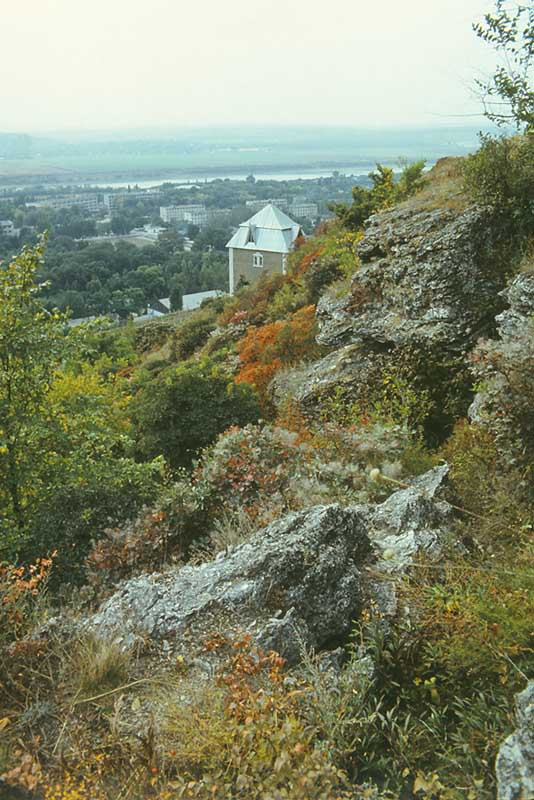
Camenca surroundings

== See also ==
- Dniester Sanatorium, based in Camenca
