= Animafilm =

- Founded: 1964
- Headquarters: Bucharest, Romania
- Owner: Ministry of Culture (Romania)
- Website: https://www.studioulanimafilm.ro/

Animafilm is a Romanian animation studio, founded in Bucharest in 1964 after Ion Popescu-Gopo won numerous awards at international festivals.

After the fall of the communist regime in 1989, the institution was reorganized as a joint-stock company by Romanian Government Decision no. 53/1991 on the establishment of autonomous film companies and commercial companies in the field of cinematography, and at the end of October 2006 Animafilm S.A. was transferred to AVAS for privatization.

Currently, the state is the majority shareholder and holds 70% of the company's shares, which are subordinated to the Ministry of Culture.

== History ==
=== Period 1964–1989 ===
The Animafilm studio was created in 1964 from the animation team of the Bucharest Cinematographic Studio, and the most famous artist and animator who worked there was the filmmaker Ion Popescu-Gopo. During the period 1964–1989, around 1260 cartoons were produced here, including 7 feature films and 15 series. Some of the Animafilm studio's productions were sold abroad, bringing in about 40% of the foreign exchange income obtained by the Socialist Republic of Romania from film exports.

The studio was led by directors Marin Pârâianu (1964–1971), Lucia Olteanu (1971–1983), George Anania (1983–1987) - interim and Mihaela Vârtopeanu (1987–1989).

=== The period after 1990 ===
Animafilm, which was originally a state studio, was reorganized after the fall of the communist regime in 1989 into a joint-stock company with state capital. The deteriorating economic situation and the underfinancing of culture had dramatic effects on the old film studio. Thus, only 15 animated films were made here until 2001, of which two were its own creations. The studio only received orders from various companies or foundations that wanted to transmit educational messages through images.

As a result, Animafilm S.A. had only ten employees in 2004, and the only production that year was an educational short film entitled Un alt fel de Love Story, made following an order received from the Bucharest Public Health Directorate, without any contribution from the state budget. The company had a profit of 248 million lei that year.

In December 2009, Animafilm produced, in collaboration with a private company, the documentary film Gopo – a legendary name directed by Manuela Hodor. This film was shown only once at the Cinemateca Eforie.

The studio was led in the post-communist period by Manuela Hodor (1992–2022) and then by Elisa Covaliu (since 2022).

== Productions ==
=== Movies ===
- Omulețul (1964). Regia: Ion Popescu Gopo
- Poveștile piticului Bimbo (1970)
- Pisica, iepurele și nevăstuica (1970) – regia: Horia Ștefănescu
- Robinson Crusoe (1974) – regia: Victor Antonescu
- Misiunea spațială Delta (serial, 1980–1983) – regia: Victor Antonescu
- Misiunea spațială Delta (1984) – regia: Mircea Toia și Călin Cazan
- Cine râde la urmă... (1986)
- Uimitoarele aventuri ale muschetarilor (1988) – regia: Victor Antonescu
- Fiul stelelor (1988) – regia: Mircea Toia
- Novăceștii (1988) – regia: Constantin Păun
- Temerarii de la scara doi (1988) – regia: Zaharia Buzea, Marian Mihail, Anamaria Buzea și Artin Badea
- Călătoriile lui Pin-Pin (1990) - regia: Luminița Cazacu

=== Serials ===
- Aventurile lui Bobo (1965-19??)
- Mihaela (1968-1983)
- Aventurile lui Dixy (1968-1971)
- Formica (1973-1974)
- Pic și Poc (1974-1975)
- Coco și Roco (1974-1975)
- Bălănel și Miaunel (1975-1983)
- Familia (1975-1978)
- Organigrame (1975-1976)
- Găina (1975-1976)
- Aventurile lui Pătrăţel (1976-1980)
- Ulise şi Penelopa (1976-1982)
- Cicy (1977-1981)
- Clubul curioșilor (1977-1983)
- Omule, mașina mică (1977-1978)
- Aventuri submarine (1978-1980)
- Știați că... (1978-1979)
- Năzdrăvanii (1979-1980)
- Detectivul amator (1980-19??)
- Misiunea spațială Delta (1980-1983)
- Peripețiile lui Ionuț (1982-19??)
- Trei prieteni (1982-1985)
- Cine râde la urmă... (1983-1985)
- Mihaela și basmele bunicii (1983-1989)
- Cei trei mușchetari (1983-1987)
- Poveste cu păpuși (1983-1984)
- Ultima Misiune (1984-1986)
- Vreau Să Ştiu (1984-1991)
- Temerarii de la scara doi (1984-1986)
- Tainele desenului (1985-1989)
- Pățaniile Mariei (1986-1992)
- Lăsați-ne să trăim (1986-1987)
- Universul muzicii (1987-1992)
- Gore și Grigore (1987-1992)
- Planetele Otiliei (1987-1991)
- Omul învingător (1987-1989)
- Gheme de lână (1987-1992)
- Noile aventuri ale muschetarilor (1987-1989)
- Harap Alb (1987-1991)
- Înapoi spre casă (1988-1992)
- Peripețiile lui Nod (1988-1990)
- Călătorind cu Kipling (1989-1991)
- Memorabila campanie (1989-1990)
- Noile aventuri ale lui Pătrățel (1992-1993)
- Țara basmelor (197?)

== See also ==
- Filmul românesc de animație#Perioada Animafilm (1964 - 1989)
- Filmul românesc de animație#Perioada de după 1990
