= Killing for Culture =

1994 book by David Kerekes and David Slater

Killing for Culture: An Illustrated History of Death Film from Mondo to Snuff
- First edition (1994)
- Author: David Kerekes, David Slater
- Language: English
- Series: Creation Cinema
- Subject: Film history, snuff film
- Publisher: Creation Books
- Publication date: 1994
- Publication place: United Kingdom
- Media type: Print (paperback)
- Pages: 284
- ISBN: 1-871592-20-8
- OCLC: 1015431001
- LC Class: PN1995.9.D37 K47 1995

Killing for Culture: An Illustrated History of Death Film from Mondo to Snuff is a 1994 book by David Kerekes and David Slater as the first part in the Creation Cinema series and deals with death in film and media. It received a second edition in 2016 as Killing for Culture: From Edison to ISIS: A New History of Death on Film, published by Headpress.

== Background and publication history ==
Killing for Culture was authored by David Kerekes and David Slater, first published in 1994 by Creation Books. Creation Books was then a new publishing house, based in London, largely focused on shocking and transgressive topics. It was the first entry in their Creation Cinema series. The cover of the first edition features a severed head being displayed.

It received a second edition in 2016 as Killing for Culture: From Edison to ISIS: A New History of Death on Film, published by Headpress in London. This edition is updated with new inclusions on the internet's portrayals of violence.

As of 2024, it was set to be adapted into a documentary by Kier-La Janisse.

== Summary ==
Killing for Culture is a look into death on film including mondo films and snuff films. It is divided into three sections, each with its own focus. The book contains several graphic photographs.

This section deals with snuff films as seen in fictional movies. It starts with a chapter on the infamous 1976 film Snuff. Made by husband-and-wife team Michael Findlay and Roberta Findlay in 1971, it was left unreleased until 1976 when Allan Shackleton added a new ending, a scene depicting what was supposed to be the film crew for the preceding movie murdering one of the actresses. Shackleton marketed the film as authentic snuff and the film was a huge hit.

The second chapter starts with an examination of Michael Powell's 1960 Peeping Tom. The film follows the exploits of a photographer, who in his spare time kills women while filming them. Considered obscene and depraved, even with its lack of nudity or blood, the film ruined Powell's otherwise good career. The next film looked at in this chapter is Joe D'Amato's 1976 film Emanuelle in America, part of the Black Emanuelle series. Emanuelle, played by Laura Gemser, is a photographer and journalist who investigates a snuff film and gets a little too close to the truth.

The second section of the book covered mondo films, a series of exploitation "shockumentaries" that presented "actual" footage of deviant sexual activities or death. Many scenes in these films, while represented as real, were fake.

The third section of the book discusses actual deaths caught on film, as presented through the media. One of the main subjects of the section was the televised suicide of Pennsylvania treasurer R. Budd Dwyer.

== Reception ==
IGN described it as "the definitive book on truly transgressive cinema", while The Guardian called it "the snuff-movie bible". The Times found its combination of "lofty academic analysis" to be "somewhat difficult to square" with the horror of its subject matter, even if the book was primarily critical. A 2017 analysis from scholar Bernice M. Murphy considered it "the seminal history of death on film".
