= Victor Antonescu (director) =

Romanian animation film director

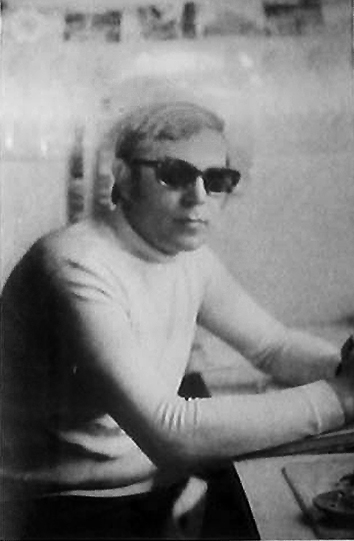
- Born: July 16, 1936 (age 90)

Victor Antonescu (born July 16, 1936, in Bucharest) is a Romanian animation film director.

Antonescu directed Robinson Crusoe, also released in Italy as Il racconto della giungla, an Italian-Romanian co-production between the Bucharest-based Animafilm studio and Corona Cinematografica. The film, co-directed on the Italian side by animator Gibba, was produced largely in Bucharest and is regarded as Romania's first animated feature film. Although it was prevented from receiving a theatrical release in Romania during the communist period, it premiered in Italy in 1974.

== Main films ==
- Robinson Crusoe (a.k.a. Il racconto della giungla) with Italian director Gibba in 1974.
- Aventuri submarine (in English Submarine Adventures) in 1978.
- Uimitoarele aventuri ale muschetarilor (in English The amazing adventures of the musketeers) two series, in 1986 and in 1990.
