= Marshall Bennett Islands =

Island group in Papua New Guinea

Coordinates: 8°50′S 151°55′E

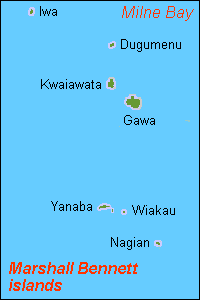
Marshall Bennett Islands

Marshall Bennett Islands (also known as the Marshall Bennets) are several islands in Milne Bay, Papua New Guinea.

== Geography ==
They consist of:

- Gawa
- Dugumenu
- Iwa Island
- Kwaiawata
- Egum Atoll with 12 islands
  - Yanaba Island (reef)
  - Egom (lagoon)
  - uninhabited islands on the fringing reef (clockwise starting west)
    - Digaragara
    - Wiakau (second largest island)
    - Napasa
    - unnamed island
    - Tabunagora
    - Nagian
  - uninhabited islands in the lagoon
    - Mua
    - Fandaio
    - Simlakita
    - Nasakori (Panamote)

They are usually considered to be part of the Woodlark Islands group. Of the islands only Dugumenu is uninhabited but is used by neighbouring islanders for the growing of coconuts.
