= 50,000 B.C. =

Studio album by Shudder to Think
- Released: 1997
- Studio: Magic Shop, New York City; Electric Lady, New York City; Soundtrack, New York City; Water Music, Hoboken, New Jersey
- Genre: Rock; pop metal; post-punk; power pop
- Length: 44:27
- Label: Epic
- Producer: Ted Niceley

Shudder to Think chronology
Pony Express Record (1994)	50,000 B.C. (1997)	First Love, Last Rites (1998)

Singles from 50,000 B.C.
- 1. "Red House" Released: 1997

50,000 B.C. is the final studio album by the American band Shudder to Think, released in 1997. The album was a commercial disappointment. The band supported it with a North American tour.

== Production ==
Kevin March, formerly of the Dambuilders, joined the band as its new drummer prior to the recording of 50,000 B.C. Singer Craig Wedren was battling Hodgkin's disease during the writing of the album; the band rewrote many of its songs to avoid producing an album that sounded too much like Pony Express Record. The album was produced by Ted Niceley.

== Critical reception ==
Professional ratings
Review scores
Source	Rating
AllMusic	4/5 stars
Chicago Tribune	3/4 stars
The Encyclopedia of Popular Music	3/5 stars
The Huntsville Times	3.5/5 stars
MusicHound Rock: The Essential Album Guide	1/5 stars
Pitchfork	3.7/10
Spin	5/10
St. Petersburg Times	A−
Uncut	5/5 stars

The Washington Post thought that "Shudder hasn't sacrificed any of its cleverness, but it has added a little bit of soul, which is what makes this the band's most compelling album." Guitar Player wrote that "the band forgets about punk credibility and lets guitarist Nathan Larson fashion the kind of gleaming pop-metal hooks that his gutsy playing has always hinted at." The Chicago Tribune noted that "STT has purged much of the complexity from its sound, leaving a brash, sophisticated power pop in its place."

Spin opined that, "for fully half the tracks on this album, Wedren's voice could not unfairly be compared to that of Journey's Steve Perry." The Sunday Times declared that "'Beauty Strike' is the perfect Shudder to Think song, rushing at breakneck speed round unpredictable musical blind corners, an irresistible melody nailed to its back bumper, but the album is eventually marooned in a swamp of lumpy metallic riffing." The Independent wrote that the album "has real fibre, a depth and passion that's rare in guitar power rock."

AllMusic called the album "the kind of eclectic post-punk that will primarily appeal to critics and record collectors."

== Track listing ==
All tracks are written by Craig Wedren, except where noted. All songs arranged by Wedren, Nathan Larson, and Stuart Hill, except where noted.

No.	Title	Writer(s)	Arranger(s)	Length
1.	"Call of the Playground"	Wedren, Nathan Larson	Wedren, Larson, Stuart Hill, Adam Wade	3:25
2.	"Red House"	Wedren, Chris Matthews	Wedren, Matthews, Hill, Mike Russell	3:44
3.	"Beauty Strike"	Wedren, Larson	Wedren, Larson, Hill, Wade	2:48
4.	"The Saddest Day of My Life"			4:02
5.	"The Man Who Rolls"		Wedren, Larson, Hill, Wade	4:08
6.	"All Eyes Are Different"	Wedren, Larson		4:05
7.	"Kissesmack of Past Action"			2:33
8.	"Resident Wine"			3:34
9.	"She's a Skull"	Wedren, Larson		2:36
10.	"Survival"			4:27
11.	"You're Gonna Look Fine, Love"	Wedren, Larson	Wedren, Larson, Hill, Wade	3:20
12.	"Hop on One Foot"			5:45
Total length:				44:27

Japanese edition bonus tracks
No.	Title	Length
13.	"There's a Word"
14.	"No RM. 9, Kentucky (Acoustic Version)"

== Personnel ==
Personnel per booklet.

Band

- Craig Wedren – lead vocals, guitar, keyboards
- Nathan Larson – guitar, keyboards, backing vocals
- Stuart Hill – bass, backing vocals
- Kevin March – drums (1–10, 12–14)

Additional musicians

- Adam Wade – drums (11)
- Steve Calhoun - percussion

Technical personnel

- Ted Niceley – producer
- Andy Baker – engineer
- Carl Glanville – engineer & mixer
- Juan Garcia – recording assistant
- Jamie Campbell – recording assistant
- Vince Reynolds – recording assistant
- Jay Nicholis – mixing assistant
- Artie Smith – equipment and technical support
- Sean Evans – art direction
- Nitin Vadukul – photography
