= List of Hung episodes =

Hung is an American comedy-drama series created by Colette Burson and Dmitry Lipkin. It premiered on June 28, 2009, on HBO and ran for three seasons, airing its final episode on December 4, 2011, before being cancelled by HBO.

Thomas Jane stars as Ray Drecker, a down-on-his-luck high school basketball coach whose life hits a particularly rough patch. His team is on a losing streak, his parents' lake house burns down and his ex-wife Jessica (Anne Heche) is remarried. He is also charged with raising his two teenage children, fraternal twins Damon and Darby (Charlie Saxton and Sianoa Smit-McPhee). Determined to turn his luck around and make sense of his life, Ray attends a self-help seminar hosted by Floyd Gerber (Steve Hytner) where he meets up with an old one-night stand, Tanya (Jane Adams), who suggests that he uses the fact that he is very well endowed to make money. With Tanya's help, Ray begins making a career for himself as a male prostitute. With the exception of the pilot, every episode is named after a quote spoken by one of the characters.

== Series overview ==
Season	Episodes	Originally released	
Season	Episodes	First released	Last released
1	10	June 28, 2009	September 13, 2009
2	10	June 27, 2010	September 12, 2010
3	10	October 2, 2011	December 4, 2011

== Episodes ==
In the following tables, "U.S. viewers (million)" refers to the number of Americans who viewed the episode on the night of its original broadcast.

=== Season 1 (2009) ===
No. overall	No. in season	Title	Directed by	Written by	Original release date	US viewers (millions)
1	1	"Pilot"	Alexander Payne	Dmitry Lipkin & Colette Burson	June 28, 2009	2.8 (3.7^{[a]})
Down-on-his-luck Ray Drecker can't catch a break. The high school basketball team he coaches is on a losing streak, his ex-wife Jessica is remarrying, his two teenage children won't even talk to him, and to top it all off, the summer house he inherited from his parents burns down, leaving him with nowhere to live. Desperate to change his life (and his luck), Ray signs up for a self-help class, where he reconnects with Tanya, an old one-night stand. She suggests Ray use his impressive endowment to enter into the escort business, with her as his pimp. At first Ray is skeptical, but after re-examining his life, he agrees to the proposal and shakily prepares for his first client.
2	2	"Great Sausage" or "Can I Call You Dick?"	Craig Zisk	Colette Burson & Dmitry Lipkin	July 12, 2009	3.6
After Damon and Darby request to move back in with Ray, he is in urgent need of quick cash and Tanya has the solution in a woman named Lenore, who has connections to many rich potential clients for Ray and Tanya's "Happiness Consultant" business. There is only one catch; Lenore insists on giving Ray a test run before recommending him to her friends. Ray and Lenore have a night together and the next morning Ray is unable to find his wallet. He reports back to Tanya, saying it went well and she promises him that not only is their business well on the way to success, but that she will also get his wallet back.
3	3	"Strange Friends" or "The Truth Is, You're Sexy"	Scott Ellis	Dmitry Lipkin & Colette Burson	July 19, 2009	2.77
Lenore has disappeared with Ray's wallet and worst of all, someone has charged four hundred dollars to his credit card. Tanya finally tracks Lenore down to her apartment, who is insulted that Tanya thinks of her as a thief. Ray and Tanya have an argument, resulting in Ray quitting the business. A despondent Tanya is unsure of what to do next when Lenore calls, saying she was satisfied with Ray's performance and that the four hundred dollars she charged to Ray's credit card was a commission. Ray and Tanya reconcile and he reconsiders quitting the business.
4	4	"The Pickle Jar"	David Petrarca	Colette Burson & Dmitry Lipkin	July 26, 2009	N/A
Ray's class presents him with a pickle jar of money, which amounts to over two hundred dollars. He dedicates it to his house repairs, but finds that the money won't even cover the cost of a single roof beam. Desperate for money, he takes Tanya up on her offer of re-entering their business and she sets up a date for him with a woman named Molly, who turns out to be older and heavier than Ray had imagined. He falls ill and excuses himself. Later, Tanya suggests that his illness may be psychosomatic. With his money woes in mind, Ray has another try at an evening with Molly, but finds a pleasant surprise waiting for him. Meanwhile, Damon has problems with Darby's new boyfriend.
5	5	"Do it, Monkey!"	Bronwen Hughes	Dmitry Lipkin & Colette Burson	August 2, 2009	3.4
Ray's new client is a young woman named Jemma (Natalie Zea), who has very specific ideas about her "fantasy date", which Ray continues to get wrong, leaving her unsatisfied. Damon and Darby's step-father Ronnie reveals to them that he is not as rich as they used to be and Ray, determined to one-up Ronnie, offers to buy them a car. After messing up yet another date with Jemma, Tanya insists that it is over and they need to find a new client. Ray goes to Jemma's house and asks for one more chance to get it right, while Tanya is miserable over another failed date.
6	6	"Doris Is Dead" or "Are We Rich or Are We Poor?"	Matt Shakman	Colette Burson & Dmitry Lipkin and Ellie Herman	August 9, 2009	N/A
Ray and Jemma are on shaky ground and Tanya fires her as a client for breaking the business rules. Jessica, acting on advice from her mother, snoops through Ronnie's papers and discovers that he's lost almost a million dollars. Ray is furious at Tanya for firing Jemma as a client and insists she go hire her back. Tanya reluctantly does so. At their dinner date, Jemma asks to know who Ray really is and he tells her that he is a high school basketball coach. That night, Jessica, along with Damon and Darby, show up at the basketball game and, much to Ray's dismay, so does Tanya and Jemma. Ray leads his team to victory and then asks Jemma if she wants to go steady, enraging Tanya that he revealed his true identity to a client.
7	7	"The Rita Flower" or "The Indelible Stench"	Jim McKay	Emily Kapnek	August 16, 2009	2.8
Tanya hooks up with a photojournalist named Pierce, who encourages her to confront her mother issues by going to a dinner party that her mother, Vera-Joan, is throwing. Ray tells Tanya he doesn't want Jemma to be a paying client anymore and she challenges him to book his own clients. After striking out with new opportunities, Ray is given some good news when Jemma agrees to go on a real date with him. Tanya reads an angry poem about her mother at the dinner party, but finds no catharsis in the experience, but is inspired to start writing poems again when she gets home.
8	8	"Thith ith a Prothetic" or "You Cum Just Right"	Bronwen Hughes	Brett C. Leonard	August 23, 2009	3.3
Ray is left broken hearted by Jemma after she rejects him and Tanya herself realizes that she doesn't know anything about her new boyfriend Pierce, even though they are sleeping together. At a dinner party hosted by Jessica, Ray confronts Ronnie about how he managed to steal her away from him. Jessica later berates Ray, and gives him some harsh truths about their failed marriage. Ray finds Tanya in his tent with a load of money from Jemma and Tanya explains to him that Jemma's fantasy date was being able to hurt a man the same way she had been hurt. Tanya comforts Ray as he drifts off to sleep.
9	9	"This Is America" or "Fifty Bucks"	Seith Mann	Angela Robinson	August 30, 2009	N/A
Tanya is continuing to struggle with finding clients and mounting financial pressure on Ray, forcing him to consider lowering his fees. Lenore coaches Ray and suggests to him that he shouldn't lower his prices, but raise them. Tanya is distrustful of Lenore and her advice and orders Ray to stay away from her. Meanwhile, Jessica forgives Ronnie for lying about his financial situation but their relationship becomes rocky once again when Ronnie discovers Jessica has been on a spending spree in Lenore's clothing store. Damon explores his sexuality with his friend Powell and Lenore makes Ray an offer to team up with her that may be too good to refuse.
10	10	"A Dick and a Dream" or "Fight the Honey"	Dan Attias	Dmitry Lipkin & Colette Burson and Emily Kapnek & Brett C. Leonard	September 13, 2009	2.9
In the first season finale, Tanya is outraged when she learns Ray wants a three-way partnership with Lenore. Ray learns he may lose his coaching job at the high school. Jessica, having made friends with Lenore, confides that she feels powerless and Lenore suggests she consult a "sex therapist". Damon breaks it off with Powell and turns to his sister for comfort. Lenore sets up Ray's next client and he is shocked to discover that it is Jessica. He calls her before she sees him and tells her he thinks they're both good parents. Ray changes his mind and goes home, so Jessica does not find out the truth about his new profession.

=== Season 2 (2010) ===
No. overall	No. in season	Title	Directed by	Written by	Original release date	US viewers (millions)
11	1	"Just the Tip"	Dan Attias	Dmitry Lipkin & Colette Burson	June 27, 2010	2.44
12	2	"Tucson Is the Gateway to Dick" or "This is Not Sexy"	David Petrarca	Dmitry Lipkin & Colette Burson and Julia Brownell	July 11, 2010	2.55
Ray irritates Lenore and risks losing a client by giving Claire marriage advice. Tanya tries to prove she can land a big fish for Ray after being humiliated by Lenore during a meeting with a 60-year-old widow. Ray uses his sex earnings to pay for the school baseball team's transportation to away games, raising Mike's suspicions. Jessica embarrasses Darby by crashing an eat-in protest outside a fitness gym. At the end of a long day, Ray reconsiders accepting a gift delivered by his neighbor's wife, Yael.
13	3	"Mind Bullets" or "Bang Bang Bang Bang Motherfucker"	Jennifer Getzinger	Colette Burson & Dmitry Lipkin	July 18, 2010	2.53
Spurred by criticism from Damon and Darby, Ray tries to prove he's not an insensitive ex-jock. Seething from the demands of her new boss at work, Tanya turns to Charlie for advice on how to deal with an even more irritable problem: Lenore. Meanwhile, Jessica feels the pinch of the economic downturn, but can't stomach Ronnie's remedy.
14	4	"Sing It Again, Ray" or "Home Plate"	Uta Briesewitz	Brett C. Leonard	July 25, 2010	2.35
Ray gives Lenore an ultimatum, and probes Tanya about the possibility of cutting ties with her fellow pimp. Disturbed that Damon has defiled the school baseball diamond, Ray considers Tanya's suggestion that his son find a new hobby to shake him out of his recent doldrums. Ignoring Ray's warning, Lenore offers Jessica advice in dealing with Ronnie. On his way to meet a new client, Ray has to think on his feet when he runs into Mike in a hotel lobby.
15	5	"A Man, a Plan" or "Thank You, Jimmy Carter"	Adam Davidson	Eileen Myers	August 1, 2010	2.43
Tanya finally gets Francis to agree to dinner with Ray and Lenore is continuing to be a pest as usual. Ray can tell that Mike is struggling to not continue with his life and tells that he needs to look at himself and tell himself that he is wonderful. Damon goes back to the Poetry Bar and embarrasses Darby after which he has a performance "enhancing" scone and sees Jessica and Ronnie naked and arguing with each other. Ray has to choose whether to cancel on the big client or his son who needs him. He chooses his son over the client by sending mike to apologize to the client behalf of him and it turns out the client and mike likes each other.
16	6	"Beaverland"	Lisa Cholodenko	Angela Robinson	August 8, 2010	2.53
Jessica turns to Ray for help with a rodent problem that may be imaginary. Rebuffed by Ray in her attempts to add Mike to her stable, Tanya gets guilt-management advice from Charlie (Lennie James), then goes to extremes to prove her success. Ray has difficulty thawing a client who is cold as ice.
17	7	"The Middle East is Complicated"	Gloria Muzio	Brett C. Leonard & Kyle Peck	August 15, 2010	2.48
When Tanya finds Lenore's sweater in Ray's bathroom, she goes to Charlie for some "relief" and Lenore finds out that Francis is no longer her client and vows revenge. Meanwhile, Ray is caught in the middle and needs to choose between Yael and a new Arab client, Samara. Things get a little complicated and it spirals for the twist.
18	8	"Third Base" or "The Rash"	Bronwen Hughes	Julia Brownell & Eileen Myers	August 22, 2010	2.42
Ray's unscheduled appointment with Claire threatens his participation in a student-alumni baseball game; Frances has doubts about her affair with Mike and her business relationship with Tanya; Ronnie delivers a stern message to Ray.
19	9	"Fat Off My Love" or "I'm the Allergen"	Colette Burson	Angela Robinson	August 29, 2010	2.53
Ray learns he's going to lose his job, as his relationship with Mike deteriorates. Ray confronts Tanya about the money from Francis. Tanya assaults her boss, who was previously warned by Lenore of Tanya's "sociopathic" tendencies. During an awards banquet, Ronnie publicly embarrasses Jessica by questioning her commitment to their marriage in front of the audience. Ray and Jessica share a late night dip and a kiss
20	10	"Even Steven" or "Luckiest Kid in Detroit"	Dan Attias	Dmitry Lipkin & Eduardo Machado and Julia Brownell & Brett C. Leonard	September 12, 2010	2.31
Ray considers a break from the business when he thinks that he might have a second chance with Jessica, but Lenore may not let him go that easily. Tanya tries to smooth things over with Frances after separate encounters with her mother and Damon. After an interesting ride home with Mindy, Ronnie returns to find that Jessica has made an important decision about their relationship.

=== Season 3 (2011) ===
No. overall	No. in season	Title	Directed by	Written by	Original release date	US viewers (millions)
21	1	"Don't Give Up on Detroit" or "Hung Like a Horse"	Colette Burson	Dmitry Lipkin & Colette Burson	October 2, 2011	1.11
In the third-season premiere, Ray and Tanya get creative to find financing when they hatch an idea to relaunch a proven product. Meanwhile, Lenore stumbles upon a valuable resource that may catch her former business partners off guard.
22	2	"Take the Cake" or "Are You Packing?"	Uta Briesewitz	Julia Brownell	October 9, 2011	1.01
Ray meets his new rival after he sweeps one of his regulars off her feet, but Tanya doesn't take the news of stolen clients lying down. Meanwhile, Jessica decides to go it alone; and Charlie reaches out to a protégé for help.
23	3	"Mister Drecker" or "Ease Up on the Whup-Ass"	Gloria Muzio	Eduardo Machado & Drew Lindo	October 16, 2011	1.03
Ray takes a nervous walk down memory lane when he thinks a former student might be a new client. Meanwhile, Jessica starts working in the office of the doctor who was married to Ronnie's mistress; Tanya pays a price to be reunited with her mentor; and Lenore makes Sandee an offer she can't refuse.
24	4	"Fuck Me, Mr. Drecker" or "Let's Not Go to Jail"	Dan Attias	Brett C. Leonard	October 23, 2011	1.04
Charlie gives Tanya advice about how to handle Lydia; Jessica finds a kindred spirit in Matt; Sandee's demands for Lenore become more extravagant; Ray and Tanya hatch a plan to rid themselves of a troublesome client.
25	5	"We're Golden" or "Crooks and Big Beaver"	Gloria Muzio	Colette Burson & Dmitry Lipkin	October 30, 2011	1.12
Jason misses a date with a client, which draws Lenore's wrath; Darby is fed up with her home life; Lydia gives Ray and Tanya an unforgettable experience after he announces a big career move.
26	6	"Money on the Floor"	Uta Briesewitz	Angela Robinson & Julia Brownell	November 6, 2011	1.09
Ray wonders if his missing money was stolen by Lenore; a new client may be added to the mix.
27	7	"What's Going on Downstairs?" or "Don't Eat Prince Eric!"	Bronwen Hughes	Eduardo Machado & Micah Schraft	November 13, 2011	1.02
Ray's night with Kyla leaves him wondering who she really is; a competition develops at the Wellness Center; Tanya gets help from Charlie in finding out what happened to Ray's money.
28	8	"I, Sandee" or "This Sex. Which Is. Not One."	Adam Davidson	Angela Robinson & Alex Kondracke	November 20, 2011	0.91
Tanya calls on the mother of Charlie's baby to help find him after he skips bail; Lenore makes it her mission to destroy the Wellness Center; Sandee coaches Jason on how to make his move; Ray worries that he's lost his magic touch with women, including Jessica.
29	9	"A Monkey Named Simian" or "Frances is Not a Fan"	Howard Deutch	Brett C. Leonard & Eileen Myers	November 27, 2011	0.97
The guest list for Frances and Mike's wedding doesn't include Tanya; Ray takes back what was his after a physical confrontation with Jason; Tanya finds a connection with Charlie's kids.
30	10	"The Whole Beefalo"	Adam Davidson	Kyle Peck	December 4, 2011	0.93
In the third-season and de facto series finale, the survival of Tanya and Ray's business depends on Charlie's whereabouts; Jessica is accused of negligence by Matt; and Sandee tries to get Lenore out of the picture for good.

== Notes ==
- ^{a} Number includes additional viewers from a midnight rebroadcast airing the same night.
