= Craig Wedren =

American singer-songwriter

- Wedren in 2025

Background information
- Born: Craig Benjamin Wedren; August 15, 1969 (age 57)
- Origin: Washington, D.C., United States
- Genres: Indie rock, post-hardcore, alternative rock
- Occupations: Singer, musician, songwriter, composer
- Instruments: Vocals, guitar
- Years active: 1986–present
- Labels: Dischord, Epic, Team Love
- Formerly of: Shudder to Think
- Website: craigwedren.com

Craig Benjamin Wedren (born August 15, 1969) is an American musician who began his career fronting the post-hardcore band Shudder to Think. Following the group's disbandment, he pursued a career as a television and film music composer, as well as releasing solo material.

== Career ==
Wedren began his career as the singer and primary songwriter for Washington, D.C.-based Shudder to Think, a band that started out in the hardcore music scene, only to challenge the aesthetics and limitations of this then-emerging musical genre. After breaking indie music tradition by signing with Epic Records (Sony Music), Shudder to Think released three major label albums including their opus Pony Express Record. Shudder to Think toured widely with bands like Smashing Pumpkins, Fugazi, and Pearl Jam, and their videos were featured in regular rotation on MTV. At the peak of their career, a battle with Hodgkin's Disease grounded Wedren and the band, but following successful treatments Shudder to Think returned with a new goal in mind – to create music for film. With Shudder to Think, Wedren scored the independent films First Love Last Rites, and High Art, and contributed music to the film Velvet Goldmine. Shortly after making the transition to film work, the band dissolved their partnership, and Wedren continued his dual career as both film composer and solo artist.

As a composer, Wedren has scored a host of popular feature films including Wanderlust, Role Models, School of Rock, Wet Hot American Summer, By the People: The Election of Barack Obama, Laurel Canyon, Reno 911!: Miami, Roger Dodger, The Baxter, and Boxers and Ballerinas. Wedren has also written and performed music for the television shows Hung, United States of Tara, Reno 911!, Stella, The State, The Whitest Kids U' Know, Dawson's Creek, Bones and Don't Trust the B— in Apartment 23.

In 2004, Wedren released a recording by his band Baby, which was in an electronic dance vein, but distinguished by glam and pop sensibilities. In addition to Wedren, Baby's lineup also included Amy Miles (The Citizens Band), Charles Scott, Lee Mars (Nine Inch Nails), Alex Edinburgh, and Brad Vander Ark (The Verve Pipe).

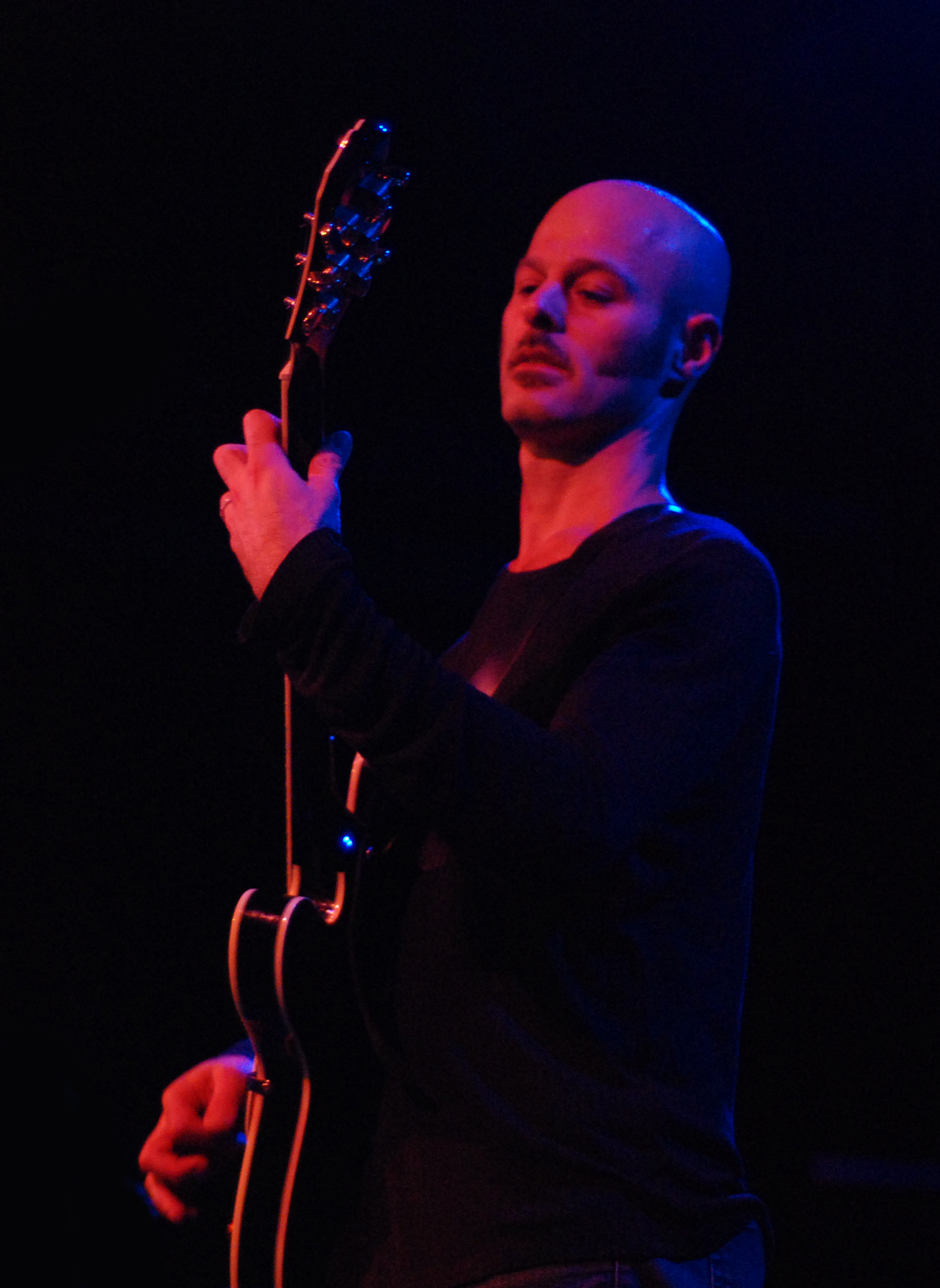
Craig Wedren performing at the Bowery Ballroom in 2007

While continuing to grow creatively and commercially as a composer, Wedren has also developed a career as a solo artist. In 2005 he released his first solo album Lapland on the Team Love label, after which he toured supporting Foo Fighters, and Greg Dulli of Afghan Whigs. In September 2011, Wedren released Wand. To accompany the release of Wand, Wedren toured the United States with Chris Cornell, and he worked with director Tim Nackashi to create a series of 360-degree interactive videos.

In 2012, Wedren re-released recordings by his band Baby. The release included previously unreleased demos, and mixes, as well as a mixed tape which includes covers, and other unreleased material.

Wedren has also contributed vocals to the musical act Tweaker with Chris Vrenna, formerly of Nine Inch Nails, The Verve Pipe's self-titled album, the musical act Cex, The Dead Science's album Villainaire and Someone To Run Away From with Pocket, Jherek Bischoff, and a Fleetwood Mac cover with St. Vincent on Fleetwood Mac Tribute record Just Tell Me That You Want Me.

Wedren wrote the theme for and was a regular extra on MTV's The State and was close friends with many members of the show. Wedren also played a part in 2009's I Love You, Man as a member of the wedding band, as well a role in David Wain's 2012 film Wanderlust. He is a regular player with Wain's cover band the Middle Aged Dad Jam Band.

Wedren also wrote and performed the title track for the movie Balls of Fury. Additionally, he wrote the song "Bondage" for the movie soundtrack.

In 2021, Wedren and Anna Waronker collaborated on the soundtrack to Showtime's Yellowjackets. The original theme song No Return, for the opening credits, was composed by the duo, alongside the score for the show. They also collaborated on the soundtrack for Hulu's Shrill in 2019.

== Personal life ==
Wedren was diagnosed with Hodgkin's lymphoma in 1995. He successfully fought the disease and, after several years of treatments, remains in remission. Since 2006, he has been married to Meggan Lennon, the sister of his The State collaborator Thomas Lennon. They share a son.

He is Jewish.

== Discography ==
=== Solo discography ===
- Lapland (2005)
- The Spanish Amnesian (2009)
- Wand (2011)
- Adult Desire (2017)
- "Sanctuary" from Hanukkah+ (2019)
- Sabbath Sessions, Vol. 1 (2020)
- Sabbath Sessions Spring 2022 (2022)
- Sabbath Sessions Summer 2022 (2022)
- Sabbath Sessions F/W 2022-23 (2023)
- The Dream Dreaming (2024)
- Sabbath Sessions Summer 2025 (2025)

=== With Shudder to Think ===
- Curses, Spells, Voodoo, Mooses (1988)
- Ten Spot (1990)
- Funeral at the Movies (1991)
- Get Your Goat (1992)
- Pony Express Record (1994)
- 50,000 B.C. (1997)

=== With Baby ===
- Baby (2004)

=== With Jefferson Friedman ===
- On in Love (2014)

=== With Flesh Car ===
- Flesh Car (2024)

=== Film and television soundtracks ===
- First Love, Last Rites (1998; with Shudder to Think)
- High Art (1998; with Shudder to Think)
- The Ten (2007)
- Role Models (2009)
- Wet Hot American Summer (2016; with Theodore Shapiro)
- Dog Days (2018; with Matt Novack)
- New Amsterdam (2021)
- Blood Hive (Original Score from the Showtime Series Yellowjackets) (2022; with Anna Waronker)
- Blood Hive 2 (Original Score from the TV Series Yellowjackets (2023; with Anna Waronker)
- Blood Hive 3 (Original Score from the TV Series Yellowjackets (2025; with Anna Waronker)

== Filmography ==
As a composer

=== Films ===
| Year | Title | Director(s) | Notes |
|---|---|---|---|
| 1997 | First Love, Last Rites | Jesse Peretz | Composed with Shudder to Think |
| 1998 | High Art | Lisa Cholodenko | Composed with Shudder to Think |
| 2001 | Wet Hot American Summer | David Wain | Composed with Theodore Shapiro |
| 2002 | Roger Dodger | Dylan Kidd | |
| 2002 | Laurel Canyon | Lisa Cholodenko | |
| 2003 | School of Rock | Richard Linklater | |
| 2004 | P.S. | Dylan Kidd | |
| 2004 | Boxers and Ballerinas | Mike Cahill; Brit Marling | |
| 2005 | The Baxter | Michael Showalter | |
| 2006 | Beautiful Ohio | Chad Lowe | |
| 2007 | The Ten | David Wain | |
| 2007 | Reno 911!: Miami | Robert Ben Garant | |
| 2008 | Role Models | David Wain | |
| 2009 | By the People: The Election of Barack Obama | Amy Rice; Alicia Sams | |
| 2012 | Wanderlust | David Wain | |
| 2013 | Afternoon Delight | Joey Soloway | |
| 2013 | Lucky Them | Megan Griffiths | |
| 2014 | They Came Together | David Wain | Composed with Matt Novack |
| 2014 | Search Party | Scot Armstrong | |
| 2017 | XX | Jovanka Vuckovic; Annie Clark; Roxanne Benjamin; Karyn Kusama | Composed with Jefferson Friedman, Carly Paradis, St. Vincent & The Gifted |
| 2017 | How to Be a Latin Lover | Ken Marino | |
| 2017 | Permanent | Colette Burson | |
| 2017 | Thank You for Coming | Sara Lamm | |
| 2018 | A Futile and Stupid Gesture | David Wain | |
| 2018 | Dog Days | Ken Marino | Composed with Matt Novack |
| 2019 | William | Tim Disney | |
| 2021 | Lady of the Manor | Justin Long; Christian Long | Composed with Bo Boddie |
| 2022 | Am I OK? | Tig Notaro; Stephanie Allynne | Composed with Annie Clark |
| 2022 | What Comes Around | Amy Redford | |
| 2023 | Organ Trail | Michael Patrick Jann | Composed with Jherek Bischoff |
| 2024 | Born Innocent: The Redd Kross Story | Andrew Reich | Composed with Anna Waronker |
| 2025 | Alma and the Wolf | Michael Patrick Jann | Composed with Jherek Bischoff |
| 2026 | Gail Daughtry and the Celebrity Sex Pass | David Wain | |

=== Television ===
| Year | Title | Showrunner(s) | Network |
|---|---|---|---|
| 1994–1995 | The State | The State | MTV (seasons 1–4); CBS (special) |
| 2005 | Stella | Michael Ian Black; Michael Showalter; David Wain | Comedy Central |
| 2009–2011 | Hung | Colette Burson; Dmitry Lipkin | HBO |
| 2010–2011 | United States of Tara | Diablo Cody; Joey Soloway | Showtime |
| 2012–2014 | Don't Trust the B— in Apartment 23 | Nahnatchka Khan | ABC |
| 2014–2015 | A to Z | Ben Queen | NBC |
| 2015–2020 | Fresh Off the Boat | Nahnatchka Khan | ABC |
| 2015 | Wet Hot American Summer: First Day of Camp | Michael Showalter; David Wain | Netflix |
| 2015–2016 | Blunt Talk | Jonathan Ames | Starz |
| 2017 | Powerless | Ben Queen | NBC (episodes 1–9); TVNZ OnDemand (episodes 10–12) |
| 2017 | Wet Hot American Summer: Ten Years Later | Michael Showalter; David Wain | Netflix |
| 2017–2019 | GLOW | Liz Flahive; Carly Mensch | Netflix |
| 2018–2023 | New Amsterdam | David Schulner | NBC |
| 2019 | Mrs. Fletcher | Tom Perrotta | HBO |
| 2019–2020 | Shrill | Aidy Bryant; Alexandra Rushfield; Lindy West | Hulu |
| 2020 | Zoey's Extraordinary Playlist | Austin Winsberg | NBC |
| 2020–2022 | Reno 911! | Robert Ben Garant; Thomas Lennon; Kerri Kenney-Silver | Quibi (season 7); The Roku Channel (season 8) |
| 2021 | The Republic of Sarah | Jeffrey Paul King | The CW |
| 2021–present | Yellowjackets | Ashley Lyle; Bart Nickerson | Showtime |
