= Michael Santos =

Michael Santos may refer to:

- Michael dos Santos (born 1983), Brazilian volleyball player
- Michael G. Santos (born 1964), American life coach and writer
- Michael Santos (footballer) (born 1993), Uruguayan footballer
