= Lapland (album) =

Studio album by Craig Wedren
- Released: October 25, 2005
- Studios: Loho, New York City; Wiggle Room, New York City
- Genre: Alternative rock
- Length: 41:05
- Label: Team Love
- Producers: Carl Glanville; Kevin March; Craig Wedren

Craig Wedren chronology
Baby (2004)	Lapland (2005)	Wand (2011)

Professional ratings
Review scores
Source	Rating
AllMusic	4.5/5 stars
PopMatters	8/10
Pitchfork	6.3/10

Lapland is an album by Craig Wedren. It was released on October 25, 2005, via Team Love Records. It was the fourth release from Team Love Records.

== Critical reception ==
Orlando Weekly called the album "reflective singer/songwriter pop." AllMusic considered it "a set of crafty, inviting pop that's also musically curious and quite personal."

== Track listing ==
All songs written by Craig Wedren, except where noted.

No.	Title	Writer(s)	Length
1.	"Kingdom"		3:21
2.	"Night Is Over"		3:05
3.	"Do You Harm"	Wedren, Jimmy Harry	2:55
4.	"Wanna Drive?"		3:12
5.	"Alone in Love"		2:35
6.	"Fifteen Minutes Late"		3:43
7.	"Rain Diamonds"		3:05
8.	"Born Curious"		2:46
9.	"Stuck"		2:57
10.	"She Don't Sleep"		3:45
11.	"Love Among Ruins"		3:35
12.	"One Man's Heart"	Wedren, Harry	5:09
13.	"Laughing Liddy"		0:57
Total length:			41:05

== Personnel ==
Personnel per booklet.

The Players

- Craig Wedren – guitar, vocals, programming, keyboards, extra bits
- Kevin March – drums, vocals
- Kevin McGinnis – guitar
- James Elliot – bass

Additional musicians

- Tara Angell – vocals (2, 3, 9)
- Angela McCluskey – vocals (2, 9)
- Amy Miles – vocals (2, 3, 9)
- Shira Berk – vocals (12)
- Stuart Blumberg – vocals (12)
- David Wain – vocals (12)
- Alethea Allen – vocals (13)
- Joe McGinty – piano (6)
- Jimmy Harry – additional programming (3)

Technical

- Carl Glanville – production, mixing, engineering
- Kevin March – production, mixing
- Craig Wedren – production, mixing, additional engineering
