= Lidè Haiti =

Haitian nonprofit organization

Lidè Haiti is an education non-profit operating in rural Haiti that provides programs in the arts, education, health, and parent and community engagement for over 1,200 adolescent girls. It was founded in 2014 by actor Rainn Wilson, author Holiday Reinhorn, and executive director Dr. Kathryn Adams.

== Visiting artists ==
Lidè has hosted writers, actors, filmmaker, and photographers who come to share their skills with teachers, apprentices and students in master classes. These artists have included: David Choe, Saelee Oh, Emily Baldoni, Stan Cahill, Philip Pardee, Christopher Heltai, Jason Jaworski, Hannah Sparkman, Erin Shachory, Olivia Melodia, Kayla Stokes, Maya Wong, and Kezia Jean. LIDÈ also hosts interns from Haitian universities who are part of the HELP scholarship program, and master teachers from among Ciné Institute graduates.
