= Permanent (film) =

- Film poster
- Directed by: Colette Burson
- Written by: Colette Burson
- Produced by: Sam Bisbee; Joshua Blum; Mary Ann Marino; Haroula Rose
- Starring: Patricia Arquette; Rainn Wilson
- Cinematography: Paula Huidobro
- Edited by: Chris Plummer
- Music by: Craig Wedren
- Production companies: 2929 Entertainment; Park Pictures; Washington Square Pictures
- Distributed by: Magnolia Pictures
- Release date: September 30, 2017 (Edmonton)
- Running time: 93 minutes
- Country: United States
- Language: English

Permanent is a 2017 American comedy film written and directed by Colette Burson and starring Patricia Arquette and Rainn Wilson.

== Plot ==
The film is set in the 1982 in small town Virginia. Aurelie is the new girl in town, having recently relocated from Washington, D.C., with her parents Jim (a former steward for Air Force One) and Jeanne. Jim is attending college on a scholarship to become a physician while Jeanne, now the breadwinner, works at the local chicken shack. Aurelie asks her parents if she can have a permanent to fit in with the "Farrah Fawcett" types in town. Her parents finally relent and take her to a local beauty school to get her hair processed at a discount. The result is disastrous, making Aurelie look more like Little Orphan Annie than Farrah. She starts school and is immediately teased by everyone. She tries to befriend the only black girl in school, Lydia, but is rebuffed. Aurelie furthers her unpopularity by overly participating in class and is frequently bullied by a group of popular girls. Aurelie reluctantly takes a karate class in order to defend herself. She sees a sign on another beauty shop in town that advertises permanent fixes for $60 and resolves to make the money. Eventually the school holds a poetry reading contest, with a top prize of $75. Aurelie signs up herself and Lydia. Lydia initially does not want to participate. During the poetry contest she panics and recites the lyrics to "Feeling Good" instead of her assigned poem. Meanwhile, Aurelie is confronted by the popular girls. She uses her karate training to defeat the girls and returns to the contest to see that Lydia has been announced the winner. Lydia offers Aurelie the money to fix her hair, and Aurelie declines saying that she no longer cares.

Jim, who wears a hairpiece, has been told by his college counselor that he must take a swimming class in order to receive his scholarship. He returns to the pool several times but cannot bring himself to put his head underwater or be seen without his hairpiece. Jeanne feels unfulfilled by her new life. Jim is unresponsive to her sexual advances, again stating he does not want to ruin his hairpiece or take it off. Jeanne instead becomes emotionally involved with their neighbor Jerry, who volunteers to teach her to be an artist and to help with family counseling. He reveals his true intentions when he comments on her breasts. During a family counseling session, Jim affirms his love and commitment to Jeanne. The film ends with Jim, Jeanne, and Aurelie at the school pool. Jim climbs the high dive, tosses his hairpiece off, and dives into the pool.

== Cast ==
- Patricia Arquette as Jeanne Dickson
- Rainn Wilson as Jim Dickson
- Kira McLean as Aurelie Dickson
- Jacqueline Jones as Maylene (Beautician)
- Michael Greene as Jerry (The Therapist)
- Sean Ramey as Pete (Martial Arts instructor)
- Nena Daniels as Lydia Johnson
- Abby Wathen as Mrs. Tripp
- Katherine S. Wright as Ginger-Ale (Druggie)
- Grey Garrett as the Tutor
- Devin Albert as Son
- Elainey Bass as Cafeteria Kid

== Production ==
The film was shot in Virginia.

== Reception ==
The film has a 38% rating on Rotten Tomatoes. Michael Ordona of Common Sense Media awarded the film three stars out of five. Sheila O'Malley of RogerEbert.com awarded the film two stars.
