= Shudder to Think =

American indie rock band

- Shudder to Think in 1996. L–R: Craig Wedren, Nathan Larson, Kevin March, and Stuart Hill

Background information
- Origin: Washington, D.C., U.S.
- Genres: Post-hardcore; indie rock; alternative rock; glam rock; experimental rock; emo; art rock; math rock; power pop; jangle pop; noise rock
- Years active: 1986–1998; 2007–2009; 2013; 2025–present
- Labels: Sammich; Hoss; Dischord; Your Choice; Sub Pop; Epic; Team Love
- Members: Craig Wedren; Nathan Larson; Adam Wade; Jherek Bischoff; Clint Walsh
- Past members: Stuart Hill; Chris Matthews; Mike Russell; Kevin March; Mark Watrous; Jesse Krakow
- Website: shuddertothinkofficial.com

Shudder to Think is an American rock band from Washington, D.C., formed in 1986. During the course of their initial existence, the band released three albums on the D.C.–based label Dischord Records, and two on Epic Records. Their early work was largely influenced by post-hardcore, although they gradually drew upon a wide range of stylistic influences, including art rock and power pop.

== History ==
In 1984, bassist Stuart Hill formed the hardcore punk band Stüge, recruiting drummer Mike Russell, alongside guitarist Sam Fleming and vocalist Bobby Jones. By 1986, Fleming and Jones left for college, with Hill inviting guitarist Chris Matthews, who had been playing in new wave group 3-2-1, to join the band. Matthews in turn suggested vocalist Craig Wedren, a high school acquaintance, after seeing him perform at a school play and being impressed by his singing. Shortly after, the band changed its name to Shudder to Think, after Russell said that he “shuddered to think that we would be just another hardcore band” during a drive to practice. It was this lineup and name change that drove the band to abandon its previous hardcore influenced sound to something more akin to post-hardcore.

In this incarnation, the band released one song on the Fetal Records compilation, F-R-5 in 1987, two singles, and their debut album in 1988, Curse, Spells, Voodoo, Mooses, before being signed by Dischord Records. Three albums were then released on the label (Ten-Spot, Funeral at the Movies, and Get Your Goat), before the band gained greater exposure by touring alongside Fugazi and The Smashing Pumpkins in 1993. The band's May 7, 1992, concert in Albig, Germany was released by Tobby Holzinger as Your Choice Live Series Vol. 21.

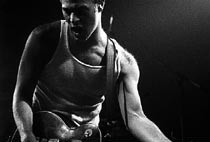
Craig Wedren performing with Shudder to Think in the early 1990s.

Swiz ex-bassist Nathan Larson and ex-Jawbox drummer Adam Wade replaced Matthews and Russell in 1992 on guitar and drums respectively. Matthews and Russell last performed live with the band on January 1, 1992, and June 28, 1992, as announced by Wedren to the crowd during those concerts.

The band subsequently signed to Epic Records, with whom Pony Express Record was released in September 1994. The album's angular, mathematical post-hardcore earned it a devoted cult following, especially after the video for the track "X-French Tee Shirt" became a buzz clip on MTV and was regularly aired on the channel, as well as an article in Rolling Stone. The track also peaked at #36 on the Radio and Records Alternative chart. The album had sold 30,000 copies in the United States by the end of October 1994, and by February 1997 had sold 60,000 copies.

Over the next few years, Wedren successfully battled Hodgkin's Disease, Larson recorded an album with side project band Mind Science of the Mind, and Wade left the group. He was replaced by Kevin March, the former drummer of The Dambuilders.

They released another album, 50,000 B.C. in 1997, touring in support of it with March on drums, and touring member Chuck Scott on keyboards and percussion. The album was released to mixed reviews and was a commercial flop. It was after this that the band pivoted to writing soundtracks for films, composing the soundtracks to First Love, Last Rites, High Art, and providing two songs for the film Velvet Goldmine in 1998.

However, 1998 marked Larson's departure and the end of the group. Wedren has pursued a solo career, including an appearance on the Down to You soundtrack with "Didn't Mean to Do You Harm", and contributed backing vocals to The Verve Pipe's 1999 eponymous album.

Both Larson and Wedren have gone on to create highly regarded music for films. David Wain, founder of comedy troupe The State, was a high-school friend of Wedren's, and Wedren's music has appeared in many television series and films stemming from the troupe and its alumni, such as Reno 911! and Wet Hot American Summer. Wedren also makes solo music, and released his debut album, Lapland, in 2005. Larson has formed a new band called Hot One.

=== Reunions ===
Shudder to Think reunited on September 17, 2007, when Craig Wedren, Nathan Larson, and Kevin March performed a short set at the Mercury Lounge in New York City, joined by guitarist Mark Watrous and Time of Orchids bassist Jesse Krakow. The group continued performing through 2008 with Watrous and Krakow, with March playing eastern U.S. shows and Adam Wade handling the western dates, including a stop in New Orleans.

A live album, Live from Home, followed in 2009, documenting performances from that reunion period. Later that year, the band—without Larson—played a farewell show at the Bowery Ballroom in New York City, where founding guitarist Chris Matthews joined for the encore.

The band reunited again in 2013 to celebrate the 20th anniversary of the Black Cat in Washington, D.C., performing with the Pony Express Record lineup—Wedren, Larson, Wade, and Stuart Hill—joined by founding members Matthews and Mike Russell for the encore. In 2025, Shudder to Think returned after more than a decade away, performing two shows at Los Angeles’ Permanent Records Roadhouse and debuting the new song “Playback.” The band has remained active since, touring intermittently and releasing the 7″ single “Thirst Walk” on Dischord Records in November 2025.

On September 11, 2026, the band released a 3-song EP entitled Who Sent You? featuring composer Jherek Bischoff, who joined the band on bass in 2025. During a 3-city mini-tour in the Fall of 2026, singer Wedren alerted fans of their first full-length album, slated for release in early 2027.

== Legacy ==
Shudder to Think has been noted as an influence by numerous bands and artists. In a 1995 interview, Jeff Buckley listed Shudder to Think as a favorite band of his. Incubus also went as far as covering part of "X-French Tee Shirt" in their song "Nowhere Fast" during Lollapalooza in 2003. In 1998, Pearl Jam invited Shudder to Think to open for them on a tour of Australia and even played a snippet of the band's song "Pebbles" during their set. Deftones have cited Shudder to Think as an influence and have even covered bits of "X-French Tee Shirt" and "So Into You" at live shows. Cursive mentions the band in their song "Sink to the Beat" off their EP, Burst and Bloom. Additionally, emo pioneers Sunny Day Real Estate and Braid have both cited the band as an influence.

OK Go frontman Damian Kulash has expressed admiration for Shudder to Think, stating "I worshipped them. There was one year I saw them twelve times." Kulash has specifically noted the band's impact on his music:

"Shudder To Think: They taught me a certain sense of intentional rock. Their music was decidedly counter-intuitive. It was weird, especially Get Your Goat and Pony Express Record. It was music that refused to resolve something you already knew and was really beautiful and melodic and emotional. (...) Shudder made music unlike anything else you ever heard and was still poppy and beautiful and accessible. I think it convinced me that there’s space for music to be interesting and challenging while still beautiful."

== Musical style ==
Shudder to Think, often classified as a post-hardcore band, emerged from Washington, D.C.’s hardcore punk scene through their early affiliation with Dischord Records. While rooted in punk, the band quickly developed a distinctive sound that fused angular rhythms with melodic pop sensibilities and art-rock experimentation. AllMusic described their approach as blending “pop influences and a skewed sense of songwriting.”

Critic Charles Spano noted that the group “skewed their pop brilliance with Ric Ocasek grooves, a Bowie- and Roxy Music-inspired glam bent, and the theatrics of Queen.”

In the 2018 book Long Live Queen, DJ and VJ Matt Pinfield cited Shudder to Think’s “X-French Tee Shirt” as an example of the band’s bold originality, describing it as “such a great song, because [the middle part] was one note, and he was singing two octaves over that.”

James Iha of The Smashing Pumpkins also praised the band’s uniqueness, stating in 1995:

“Shudder to Think, I think, is a wholly original, amazing rock band. They’re a rock band but they’re totally different than what you’ve heard before... They write good songs. They’re totally original.”

== Band members ==
Current members

- Craig Wedren - lead vocals (1986–1998, 2007–2009, 2013, 2025–present); guitar (1991–1998, 2007–2009, 2013); keyboards (1996–1998)
- Nathan Larson - guitar (1992–1998, 2007–2008, 2013, 2025–present); keyboards (1996–1998)
- Clint Walsh - guitar (2025–present)
- Jherek Bischoff - bass (2025–present)
- Adam Wade - drums (1992–1996, 2008, 2013, 2025–present)

Former members

- Chris Matthews - guitar (1986–1992, 2009, 2013, 2026)
- Mark Watrous - guitar (2007–2009)
- Stuart Hill - bass (1986–1998, 2013)
- Jesse Krakow - bass (2007–2009)
- Mike Russell - drums (1986–1992, 2013)
- Kevin March - drums (1996–1998, 2007–2009)

== Discography ==
=== Studio albums ===
- Curses, Spells, Voodoo, Mooses (1988, Sammich)
- Ten Spot (1990, Dischord)
- Funeral at the Movies (1991, Dischord)
- Get Your Goat (1992, Dischord)
- Pony Express Record (1994, Epic)
- 50,000 B.C. (1997, Epic)

=== Soundtrack Albums ===
- Music from the Motion Picture Soundtrack High Art (1998, Velvel)
- Music from the Motion Picture First Love, Last Rites (1998, Epic/Sony Music Soundtrax)
- Music from the Original Motion Picture Velvet Goldmine (1998, London Records/Inner-State Recordings)

=== Live Albums ===
- Your Choice Live Series (1992, Your Choice)
- Live from Home (2009, Team Love)

=== Compilations ===
- Funeral at the Movies & Ten Spot (1991, Dischord)
- 1987 (100,019 Men Go Wow Wow Wow) (2024, L.G.)

=== Singles and EPs ===
- It Was Arson (1988, Sammich)
- Medusa Seven (1989, Hoss 45 Recordings)
- Catch of the Day - split w/ Unrest (1990, Big Dragg/Union Hall)
- Hit Liquor / No Room 9, Kentucky (1992, Dischord)
- Inside Dave's Garage: Volume Four - split w/ Shonen Knife (1994, Radiopaque Recordings)
- Hit Liquor (1994, Epic/Big Cat)
- Shudder to Think (1994, Epic)
- X-French Tee Shirt / Shake Your Halo Down (1994, Sub Pop)
- X-French Tee Shirt / In Circles (Edit) - split w/ Sunny Day Real Estate (1994, Sub Pop)
- X-French Tee Shirt (1995, Big Cat)
- So Into You (1995, Epic)
- Red House (1997, Epic)
- Thirst Walk / Playback (2025, Dischord)
- Who Sent You? (2026, Dischord)
