= The Bassoon King =

Nonfiction book by Rainn Wilson

- Author: Rainn Wilson
- Language: English
- Subject: Memoir
- Publisher: Dutton Penguin
- Publication date: November 2015
- Publication place: United States
- ISBN: 978-0-525-95453-8

The Bassoon King: My Life in Art, Faith, and Idiocy is a nonfiction book by American actor Rainn Wilson, published in November 2015 by Dutton. It is a combination of a coming-of-age memoir discussing his career and celebrity status coupled with discussions on religion and more, with Wilson's involvement in the Baháʼí Faith since his early childhood playing a major role. The book has received supportive coverage in a variety of publications such as the Los Angeles Times and Publishers Weekly.

== Background and book contents ==
Wilson has remarked, "I kind of wanted to do a reader's guide for young people about spirituality". He's added that he wished to describe his interests in "the essentials of life", creating a work that "would be for anyone who was going on a spiritual journey". The actor goes into many details about his early life, describing eccentricities such as having a pet sloth growing up and spending time in weekend-long Dungeons & Dragons marathons. The book's title refers to his hobby of playing the bassoon. Various twists and turns in his acting career get explored in depth. Details about muggings and robberies coupled with his going through drug and alcohol related problems fill his depictions of the 1980s in New York City; he ultimately fails to really break into theatre acting despite his best efforts making it on Broadway.

Much of the book goes into the filming of the popular American television series The Office, in which Wilson played the character Dwight Schrute. The author wrote an introductory piece to The Bassoon King in the fictional voice of Schrute. The character criticizes the actor that plays him as a "privileged Hollywood windbag".

== Reviews and reception ==
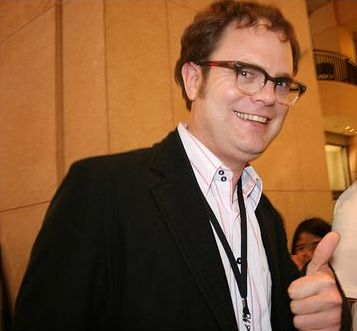
Wilson is pictured in October 2007 at the Dan in Real Life premiere.

Publishers Weekly responded favorably to the book, with the publication's review commenting that "Wilson’s story is engaging" and that readers "will relish his experiences". The review also cited Wilson's "digressions on favorite albums, unremarkable jobs, and his various acting teachers" coupled with the author's "description of gritty, raucous Manhattan".

== See also ==
- 2015 in literature
