= Michael G. Santos =

American prison reform activist

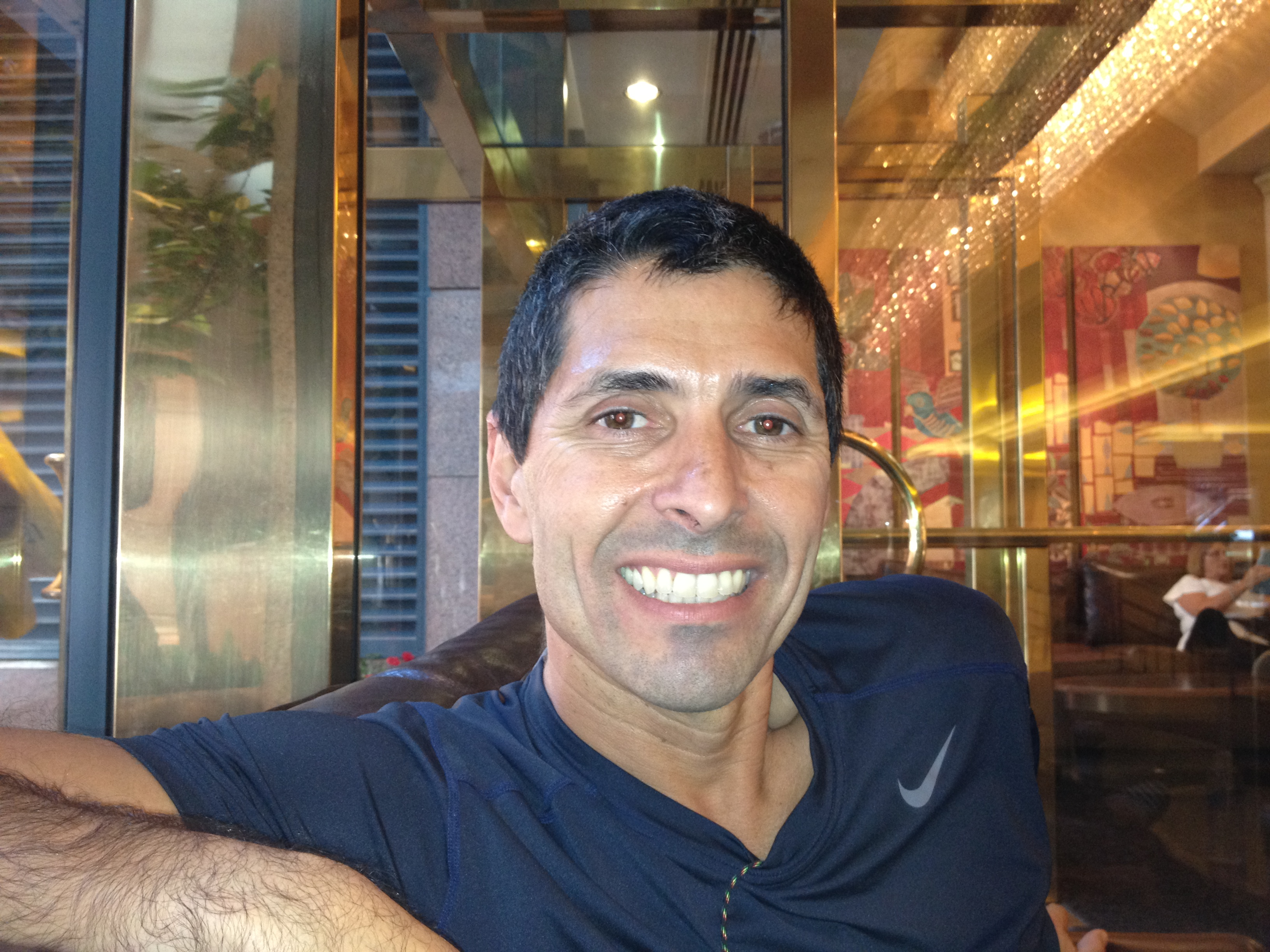
- Born: January 15, 1964 (age 62); Seattle, Washington
- Education: Mercer University (B.A.); Hofstra University (M.A.); University of Connecticut (Ph.D. Candidate)
- Occupations: Consultant; author; activist/reformer
- Notable work: Inside: Life Behind Bars in America (2007)
- Spouse: Carole Santos
- Website: MichaelSantos.com

Michael Gerard Santos (born January 15, 1964) is an advocate for criminal justice reform and an author of several books and courses. He teaches strategies that justice-impacted people can use to prepare for success after prison.

Santos spent 26 years in federal prison, on a 45-year sentence. He served time in prisons of every security level and served his sentence in 19 different United States federal prisons.

During his decades of federal prison incarceration, Santos successfully transformed his life for the better by obtaining an education, getting married, writing several books, blogging, and working to prepare himself for a successful law-abiding life.

After release from prison, Santos taught criminal justice students at San Francisco State University, works as a prison consultant, is a motivational speaker and life coach, and continues to advocate for reformation of America's criminal justice system.

== Early life ==
Michael Santos grew up with two sisters in Lake Forest Park, a city near Seattle in Washington. He had a relatively stable family life. Santos is the son of a Cuban immigrant father and a mother of Spanish descent. His parents were small business owners.

Santos attended Shorecrest High School. He was a mediocre student, played football, and skied on the team. Santos graduated from high school in 1982. While in high school, a judge sentenced Santos to probation for receiving stolen property, which was given to him as partial payment of a gambling debt owed to him. This was the extent of Santos' criminal record prior to his conviction for distributing cocaine.

== Drug trafficking, trial, and sentencing ==
=== Crime ===
After high school Santos worked for the family's highway construction business, which the family had operated since 1970. In 1985 Santos and a friend participated in a several-kilogram cocaine deal. After this first big sale, Santos began buying and selling cocaine. Although he made a lot of money in Seattle, Santos wanted more. So he moved to Miami to work with suppliers.

In search of lower wholesale prices for cocaine, Santos relocated to Key Biscayne, South Florida. There his lifestyle was influenced by the movies Scarface and Miami Vice. Santos purchased cocaine from a source in Miami, a friend transported it from Miami to Seattle, and the friend from the original purchase would distribute it locally in Seattle. In June 1986, Drug Enforcement Administration Agents arrested Santos' friend in Seattle.

=== Arrest and trial ===
In 1987, at the age of 23, federal agents arrested Santos for allegedly leading a scheme to distribute cocaine. In exchange for Santos's friend's cooperation, he received a four-year prison term, for which he served about 27 months. In contrast, relying on the advice of counsel Santos took his case to trial, at which Santos' partners testified against him. Additionally, Santos testified on his own behalf in the trial stemming from the first indictment against him. Santos was found guilty on all counts.

Although Santos was not initially charged with distribution of cocaine that took place after his arrest, he made a statement to the U.S. attorney accepting full responsibility for distribution while incarcerated. Santos further admitted to lying at his trial (committing perjury). For this conduct Santos separately agreed to plead guilty to perjury, and guilty for helping others distribute the cocaine leftover from the previous indictment.

=== Setting goals and sentencing ===
As Santos awaited sentencing, he picked up a copy of Treasury of Philosophy by Dagobert D. Runes and learned about Socrates. Santos told Judge Jack Edward Tanner: "I have to find a way to reconcile with society." Santos set three goals: to educate himself, to find a way to contribute to society, and to start building a support network of law-abiding citizens who could mentor him.

Judge Tanner sentenced Santos to a 45-year sentence for "operating a continuing criminal enterprise". Santos was tried and convicted during Ronald Reagan's heightened War on Drugs which included creating mandatory minimum sentencing. Once he was determined to be guilty, this resulted in the federal government using Santos' sentencing to make an example to deter other criminals.

== Prison ==
Michael served his sentence in many different prisons of every security level, from high-security United States Penitentiaries to minimum-security federal prison camps across the United States. Santos began his sentence at the infamous United States Penitentiary, Atlanta. Santos also was imprisoned at Federal Correctional Institution, McKean, Federal Correctional Institution, Fairton, Federal Correctional Institution, Fort Dix, and Federal Correctional Institution, Lompoc, among others.

=== Education ===
When Santos arrived at the Atlanta penitentiary his then-wife divorced him. Santos' father lost his business; his parents separated. Despite such adversity Santos remained disciplined and stuck to his goals. By 1992 Santos earned a bachelor's degree from Mercer University (with a degree in human resources management). By 1995 Santos earned a master's degree from Hofstra University, and began work toward his doctorate at the University of Connecticut; however, a Bureau of Prisons warden blocked Santos from completing his studies to earn a doctorate.

=== Writing and activism ===
After the warden ended his education opportunities Santos shifted focus to develop programs and resources to help fellow inmates and their families. Additionally, while incarcerated Santos authored seven books and had published a number of articles, including for The Huffington Post and Forbes. Since prisons did not offer access to computers, Santos in longhand manually wrote all books and articles. Santos' wife Carole would then transcribe his work into computer format. Carole also served as a liaison with publishers.

With help from his wife and family, from within prison Santos nevertheless built a significant presence on the Internet. Through the website MichaelSantos.com chronicled his long arduous journey. Moreover, the appeal of his writing resulted in Santos receiving widespread popularity. Media publications cite Santos saying his published writings are his way of contributing to society. His wife maintained his contributions to a blog. Those writings resulted in his receiving significant recognition and universities use his work in courses that teach criminal justice.

== Release ==
The Bureau of Prisons released Michael Santos to community confinement in August 2012, when he was 48. At that time he had served more than 25 years in federal prison, a (total of 9,135 days in federal custody). Michael remained in federal custody for another year within the confines of the halfway house. He concluded his obligation to the Bureau of Prisons after more than 26 years on August 12, 2013. The San Francisco Chronicle published an article describing Michael Santos' lengthy odyssey. Michael claimed that he could maintain a high level of discipline and energy because he kept his focus on reconciling with society and emerging with his dignity intact. The Chronicle quoted Distinguished Stanford Professor Joan Petersilia as saying that Michael was a "Messiah" to other prisoners.

After his release Michael continued to work toward ending mass incarceration and toward helping others who were being prosecuted by the criminal justice system. Along with Justin Paperny of The Michael G. Santos Foundation, Michael developed programs to help people emerge from the prison experience successfully; he worked to help the formerly incarcerated transition into the labor market; and he worked to bring more awareness to social breakdowns which he believes are spawned by "America's commitment to mass incarceration". He is also a public speaker on overcoming adversity, using the context of his journey as evidence that anyone can become more than external circumstances. Michael has also lectured at numerous universities, including Stanford Law School, the University of San Francisco, and UC Berkeley.

In 2014, PBS's Newshour did video feature story on Santos' efforts to help empower people incarcerated in America and Santos' criticism of America's commitment to mass incarceration.

In 2015, Santos teamed with the Maine Department of Corrections to improve the outcomes of the state's prison system through programs designed by Santos.

== Books ==
- Earning Freedom: Conquering a 45-year Prison Term (2011)
- Triumph!: Straight-A Guide to Preparing Offenders for Reentry (2011)
- Prison! My 8,344th Day (2010)
- Step Up and Don't Look Back (2007)
- Gangsters and Thugs: Consequences That Hustlers Pay (2007)
- Inside: Life Behind Bars in America (2007)
- What If I Go to Prison? (2004)
