= Shorecrest High School =

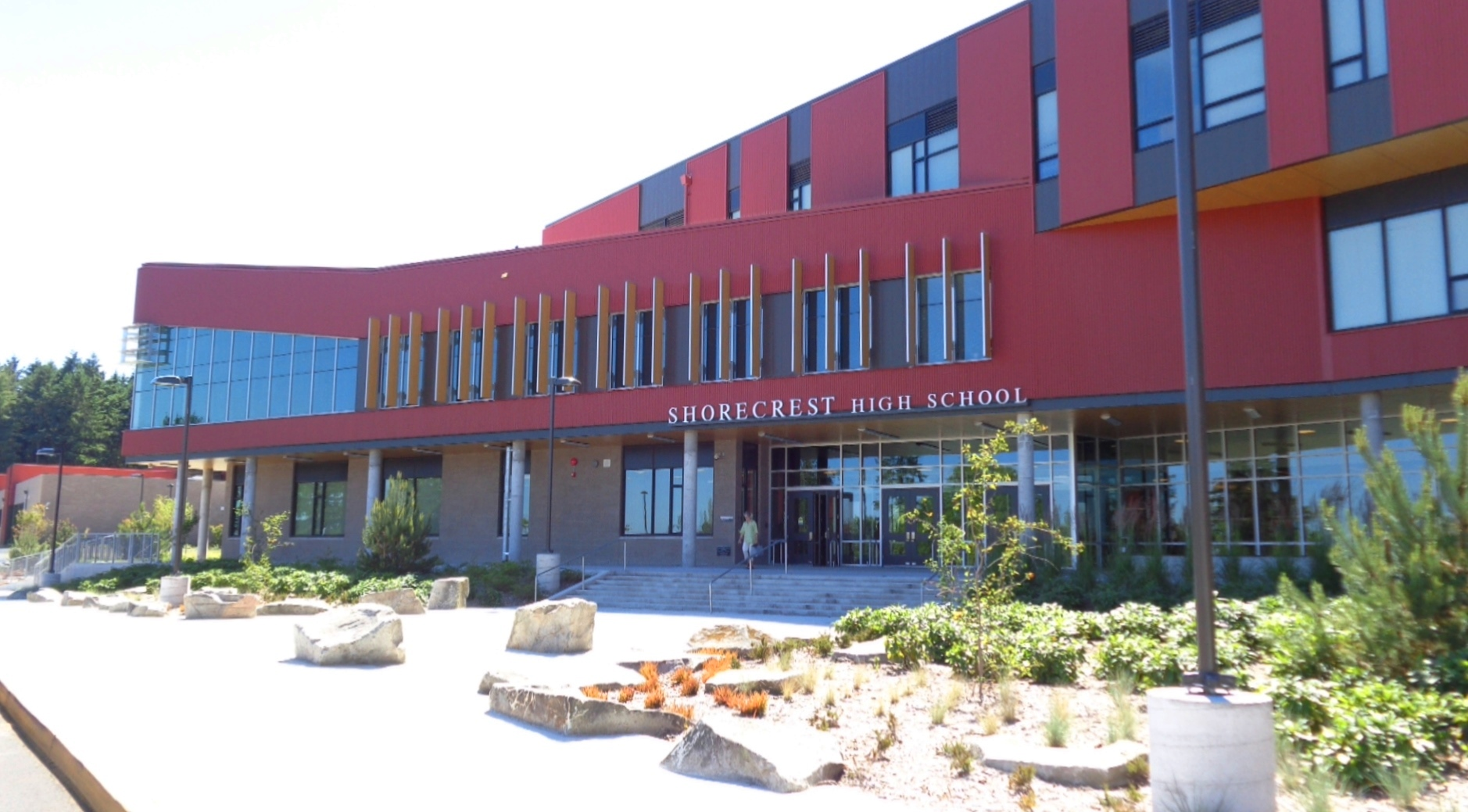
- Main entrance in 2015

Location
- 15343 25th Avenue NE; Shoreline, Washington 98155; United States; 47°44′28″N 122°18′14″W

Information
- Type: Public
- Motto: Seeing far... Working close... Creating choices... Building excellence... We are Shorecrest
- Established: 1961
- Teaching staff: 59.91 (FTE)
- Enrollment: 1,527 (2023–2024)
- Student to teacher ratio: 25.49
- Colors: Navy, Forest green and gold
- Mascot: Otis, the Fighting Scot
- Nickname: Highlanders
- Newspaper: The Highland Piper
- Yearbook: The Loch
- Website: shorecrest.ssd412.org

Shorecrest High School is a public high school (grades 9 through 12) in Shoreline, Washington, United States. It was founded in 1961 and is one of two high schools in the Shoreline School District. Its mascot is Otis the Fighting Scot, and students refer to themselves as “Scots” or the “Highlanders,” the latter a reference to the Clan Gordon.

The high school's 42-acre (17 ha) campus was originally on land leased from the Washington State Department of Natural Resources until the Shoreline School District bought it outright in 1985. Shorecrest moved to a new building on the campus over two phases in 2012 and 2014 that cost $94 million to construct. The new buildings include a three-story academic building with a commons area and library, a separate gymnasium and athletic complex, and a performing arts center with a 450-seat theater.

== Demographics ==
The demographic breakdown of the 1,450 students enrolled for the 2017–2018 school year was:

- Male – 50.8%
- Female – 49.2%
- American Indian/Alaska Native – 0.2%
- Asian – 14.3%
- Black – 8.7%
- Hispanic – 11.0%
- Native Hawaiian/Pacific Islander – 0.5%
- White – 52.8%
- Two or More Races – 12.5%

In addition, 26.8% of the students were eligible for free or reduced lunch.

== Student media ==
- Tattoo (literary arts magazine)
- The Highland Piper (student newspaper)
- The Loch (annual)
- SCNN/Shorecrest News Network (video news)

== Notable alumni ==
=== Arts and entertainment ===
- Rainn Wilson, actor
- Jeff Kashiwa, jazz musician
- Sanjaya Malakar, American Idol contestant (Season 6)
- Richard Sparks, choral conductor
- Adam Ray, actor, comedian, podcaster
- Stephen O'Malley, experimental musician, producer and composer
- Ray Dalton, contemporary pop singer-songwriter

=== Athletes ===
- Michelle Akers, professional soccer player, member of 1991 and 1999 U.S. Women's National Teams
- Ken Bone, former Washington State University and Portland State University head men's basketball coach
- Tony Crudo, professional soccer player
- Jason Farrell, former Major League Soccer and National Professional Soccer League midfielder with Columbus Crew, Kansas City Attack, and Wichita Wings
- Caros Fodor, professional Mixed Martial Artist for WSOF
- Allen James, two-time Olympian in the 20k (1992) and 50k walk, (1996)
- Phoenix Jones, professional MMA fighter
- Charlie McKee, Olympic bronze medalist, 1988 sailing – 470; Olympic bronze medalist, 2000 sailing – 49'er
- Jonathan McKee, Olympic gold medalist, 1984 sailing – Flying Dutchman; Olympic bronze medalist, 2000 sailing – 49'er
- Ray Pinney, former National Football League offensive lineman with Pittsburgh Steelers
- Glendon Rusch, Major League Baseball pitcher, minor-league coach
- Sue Semrau, head women's basketball coach at Florida State University
- Marc Wilson, former NFL quarterback with New England Patriots, Oakland Raiders
- Henry Wingo, professional soccer player, Seattle Sounders FC
- Katrina Young, Olympic platform diver at the 2016 and 2020 Olympic Games

=== Business ===
- Matt Williams, American Internet entrepreneur and CEO of Pro.com

=== Government, law, social activism ===
- Dan Kristiansen, 39th District Washington State Representative (R)
- Michael G. Santos, prison reform activist and author

== Athletics ==
The following is a listing of the sports offered at Shorecrest and the state tournament championships won.

- Baseball – State champions, 1975.
- Tennis – Boy's state champions, 2015.
- Cross country running – Boy's state champions, 1984, 1985.
- Football
- Volleyball
- Soccer – Boy's state champions, 1976, 2005 and 2009; Girl's state champions 1983, 1985, 1992, 1993 and 1995
- Swimming
- Basketball
- Gymnastics
- Dance – Highland dancing, hip hop
- Wrestling
- Golf
- Track and field – Girl's state champions, 2015.
- Softball – 4A state champions, 2001
- Cheerleading
- Color guard (flag spinning)
