= Hung (TV series) =

American television series

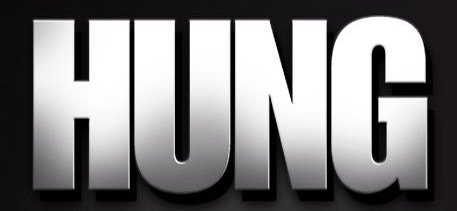
- Genre: Comedy drama
- Created by: Colette Burson; Dmitry Lipkin
- Starring: Thomas Jane; Jane Adams; Anne Heche; Eddie Jemison; Sianoa Smit-McPhee; Charlie Saxton; Rebecca Creskoff; Gregg Henry; Lennie James; Stephen Amell
- Opening theme: "I'll be your Man" by The Black Keys
- Composer: Craig Wedren
- Country of origin: United States
- Original language: English
- No. of seasons: 3
- No. of episodes: 30 (list of episodes)

Production
- Executive producers: Colette Burson; Dmitry Lipkin; Alexander Payne; Michael Rosenberg; Noreen Halpern; John Morayniss
- Running time: 28 minutes
- Production companies: Tennessee Wolf Pack; E1 Entertainment (2009-10); Entertainment One (2011); HBO Entertainment

Original release
- Network: HBO
- Release: June 28, 2009 – December 4, 2011

Hung is an American comedy-drama television series that ran on HBO from June 28, 2009, to December 4, 2011. It was created by Colette Burson and Dmitry Lipkin, and stars Thomas Jane as Ray Drecker, a struggling suburban Detroit high-school basketball and baseball coach who resorts to prostitution. The second season premiered on June 27, 2010, and concluded its 10-episode run on September 12, 2010. The third season premiered on October 2, 2011, and concluded its 10-episode run on December 4, 2011. The series was cancelled after three seasons.

== Plot ==
Hung follows Ray Drecker, a high-school basketball coach in the suburbs of Detroit, who is short on money. He is also the father of twin teenagers who move in with their remarried mother after a fire damages the childhood home Ray still owns. With no insurance to cover the damage from the fire, Ray is left without many options. With the help of a friend, Tanya, Ray decides to use his above-average-sized penis as an opportunity to make money. The episodes center on Ray's attempts to maintain a normal life while starting his business as a prostitute. Together, Tanya and Ray start their business, Happiness Consultants.

The second season focuses on the complex dynamic between Ray and his two pimps, Tanya and Lenore. Lenore, a life coach whom Tanya brought in to help them in the early stages of the business, began taking over Happiness Consultants late in the first season, as she believes she can take Ray into new business areas and views Tanya as an obstacle.

The third season has Tanya and Ray forced to compete for clients against Lenore and her younger gigolo Jason.

== Episodes ==
Season	Episodes	Originally released	
Season	Episodes	First released	Last released
1	10	June 28, 2009	September 13, 2009
2	10	June 27, 2010	September 12, 2010
3	10	October 2, 2011	December 4, 2011

== Cast and characters ==
=== Main ===
- Thomas Jane as Ray Drecker, a former star athlete-turned-high-school-teacher/coach and single dad, who decides to parlay his nine-inch penis into a career as a prostitute in order to provide a better life for himself and his children.
- Jane Adams as Tanya Skagle, a former flame of Ray's who reunites with him later on. She takes on the role of his pimp after proving to have the optimism to make money in the business.
- Anne Heche as Jessica Haxon, Ray's ex-wife, who is trying to build a relationship with her children as they drift away from her. She also finds herself drifting from her new husband, Ronnie.
- Charlie Saxton as Damon Drecker, Ray and Jessica's son. He partakes in goth-like activities and is unsure as to his exact sexuality. He has issues with his mom, has an unhealthy fixation on his sister and has a very positive relationship with his father.
- Sianoa Smit-McPhee as Darby Drecker, Ray and Jessica's daughter and Damon's twin. Darby has had issues with her boyfriend and is very close to her brother, often a source of support.
- Eddie Jemison as Ronnie Haxon (seasons 1–2, recurring season 3), Jessica's new husband, who is starting to focus more on business than romance, causing both Jessica and himself to drift to outside romantic sources.
- Rebecca Creskoff as Lenore Bernard (recurring season 1, seasons 2–3), a life coach who is introduced to Ray by Tanya to bring in clients. Eventually, Lenore proves she can be a better pimp than Tanya, resulting in the two battling for Ray's attention.
- Gregg Henry as Mike Hunt (recurring season 1, seasons 2–3), Ray's good friend and assistant coach. He gradually becomes suspicious of Ray's behavior and is worried about being laid off as the school begins cutting costs.
- Lennie James as Charlie (recurring season 2, season 3), Tanya's pimp mentor.
- Stephen Amell as Jason (season 3), a young prostitute found by Lenore to serve as competition against Ray.

=== Recurring ===
- Natalie Zea as Jemma (season 1)
- Bob Piggott as himself (season 1-pilot)
- Joshua Leonard as Pierce (season 1)
- Steve Hytner as Floyd Gerber (season 1)
- Alanna Ubach as Yael Koontz (seasons 1–3)
- Loren Lester as Howard Koontz (seasons 1–2)
- Marylouise Burke as Lottie (seasons 1–3)
- Gina Hecht as Principal Mumu (season 1)
- Lauren Weedman as Horny Patty (season 1)
- Amy Farrington as Mindy Saline (season 1)
- Kathryn Hahn as Claire (season 2)
- Roxanne Hart as Frances (seasons 2–3)
- Merrin Dungey as Liz (season 2)
- Matt Walsh as Matt Saline (season 2–3)
- Mageina Tovah as Christina (season 2)
- Mozhan Marnò as Samara (season 2)
- Lio Tipton (Note: Credited as Analeigh Tipton; Tipton came out as non-binary and changed their name in 2021.) as Sandee: Jason's fiancée (season 3)
- Ana Ortiz as Lydia: A violent client with personal problems (season 3)
- Kaitlin Doubleday as Logan: A former student of Ray (season 3)
- Jamie Clayton as Kyla (season 3)

== Production ==
The show's pilot was directed by filmmaker Alexander Payne, who served as executive producer along with Burson, Lipkin, and Blueprint Entertainment. Burson and Lipkin's script was the first major purchase by the network's new entertainment president Sue Naegle in April 2008. This led the writers to immediately work on five more episodes for the series, a total of 10 episodes. On December 18, 2008, HBO announced picking up the series for its first season, which ran from June 28, 2009, to September 13, 2009. On July 30, 2009, HBO announced it had renewed the series for its second season, which ran from June 27, 2010. In December 2011, HBO announced the cancellation of the series, ending it after three seasons.

For his role as Ray Decker, Thomas Jane was nominated three times as Best Actor for a Golden Globe.

The theme song for Hung is "I'll Be Your Man" by The Black Keys from their debut album The Big Come Up (2002).

Much of the show was filmed in the suburban Detroit cities of Royal Oak, Hamtramck, White Lake, Troy, Walled Lake, Clarkston, and West Bloomfield, Michigan.; and from 2010 to 2011 was shot in Stage 7 at the Paramount Studios.

== Home media ==
DVD releases
Season	Region 1 Release Date	Region 2 Release Date	Region 4 Release Date	Episodes	Discs	Bonus Features
1	June 22, 2010	September 13, 2010	August 4, 2010	10	2	Disc 1: Audio commentary on episodes 1 and 4 with the creators and executive producers of the series Colette Burson and Dmitry Lipkin. – Disc 2: About Hung. • Women Hung. • Personals Ray and Tanya. • Audio commentary on episode 8 with the creators and executive producers of the series Colette Burson and Dmitry Lipkin and writer Brett C. Leonard.
2	September 27, 2011	October 17, 2011	TBA	10	2	TBA
3	September 4, 2012	TBA	TBA	10	2	TBA

== Reception ==
Hung was well received by critics. For its first season, the series' reviews equated to generally positive, with special mentions made to Thomas Jane and Jane Adams for their lead performances. The show received many nominations during its run.

Casting Society of America, USA

- 2010: Outstanding Achievement in Casting – Television Pilot (Comedy): Lisa Beach and Sarah Katzman (nominated)

Golden Globe Awards

- 2012: Best Actor – Television Series: Musical or Comedy: Thomas Jane (nominated)
- 2011: Best Actor – Television Series: Musical or Comedy: Thomas Jane (nominated)
- 2010: Best Actor – Television Series: Musical or Comedy: Thomas Jane (nominated)
- 2010: Best Supporting Actress – Series, Miniseries, or Television Film: Jane Adams (nominated)

Primetime Emmy Award

- 2010: Outstanding Cinematography for a Half-Hour Series: Uta Briesewitz (Episode: "Pilot") (nominated)

Satellite Awards

- 2010: Best Actor – Television Series: Musical or Comedy: Thomas Jane (nominated)
- 2010: Best Actress – Television Series: Musical or Comedy: Jane Adams (nominated)

Writers Guild of America Award

- 2010: Best Screenplay – New Series: Colette Burson, Ellie Herman, Emily Kapnek, Brett C. Leonard, Dmitry Lipkin, and Angela Robinson (nominated)
