= Pony Express Record =

Studio album by Shudder to Think
- Released: September 13, 1994
- Recorded: 1993
- Studios: Oz, Baltimore
- Genres: Post-hardcore; math rock; alternative rock; noise rock; glam rock; art rock
- Length: 53:50
- Label: Epic
- Producer: Ted Niceley

Shudder to Think chronology
Get Your Goat (1992)	Pony Express Record (1994)	50,000 B.C. (1997)

Singles from Pony Express Record
- 1. "Hit Liquor" Released: 1994; 2. "X-French Tee Shirt" Released: 1994; 3. "So Into You" Released: 1995

Pony Express Record is the fifth studio album by American post-hardcore band Shudder to Think, released in 1994 by Epic Records. It was the first album of the band to feature guitarist Nathan Larson and drummer Adam Wade, after the departure of founding members Chris Matthews and Mike Russell. The album saw the band attempting to craft a unique sound. According to Wade, "high up on our agenda it was like, 'No matter what, we cannot sound like anybody else.' We didn’t want to be Fugazi or Soundgarden—though those influences were there." Larson recalls of the album: "We definitely made our strangest record to date. We really did want to have a pop hit, but we made a really weird record. Get Your Goat is brighter and poppier. Pony Express is velvety and dark".

== Reception ==
Professional ratings
Review scores
Source	Rating
AllMusic	4.5/5 stars
The Boston Phoenix	2.5/4 stars
The Encyclopedia of Popular Music	4/5 stars
The Great Alternative & Indie Discography	7/10
Kerrang!	4/5 stars
MusicHound Rock	woof!
Pitchfork	9.1/10
Q	4/5 stars

Pony Express Record has received considerable critical acclaim. Greg Prato of AllMusic retrospectively regarded it as "one of the most underrated rock records of the '90s". In 2003, Stylus Magazine writer Deen Freelon wrote that the album was "a jaw-dropping, head-scratching masterpiece back in '94 and remains so today".

Pitchfork placed the album at number 29 on its original 1999 list of the top 100 albums of the 1990s.

Magnet wrote: "Even as the alt-rock market got saturated in the mid-'90s ... there were still some surprises in store. Shudder To Think was one of the oddest major-label signings of the decade, partnering with Epic for 1994's Pony Express Record." They describe the band as "a mix of avant-garde punk, glam and Queen-y arena rock." The A.V. Club's Marc Hawthrone similarly writes: "One of the weirdest major-label signings during the indie feeding frenzy of the ’90s—leaping from the punker-than-punk Dischord, no less—Shudder To Think never really fit into any easily recognizable category, acting too pop to be punk, too post-punk to be pop, and just too strange to have any hits."

In 2017, Treble included Pony Express Record in their list of "10 Weird Major Label Debuts" They added that the group's signing with Epic could be considered an effect of the "signing frenzy" that followed Nirvana's rise to fame, they also deemed Shudder to Think to be Epic's equivalent of signing fellow post-hardcore band Fugazi. Terich said "when they made the majors, they were no longer an art-punk band, but rather an art band, with a side of punk. ... This is a brilliant album, and an underrated gem of the '90s. It's also the last thing you’d think a label looking for the next Nirvana would've asked for." Elsewhere, Terich considered it "not only an unusual album for what's ostensibly presented as mainstream-friendly alternative rock, it's an unusual album by any measure."

Brian Stout of PopMatters writes: "Pony Express Record is one of the most enduring releases of the 1990s, evergreen for the very reasons it wasn’t a massive hit upon release." While considering the album to perfect the group's blend of punk, glam and new wave, Stout adds that it is "also a challenging record, filled with riffs that stop and start and lyrics filled with compelling images that are sinister at times and hilarious at others". Peter Gaston of Spin describes Pony Express Record as "a polarizing Rubik's Cube of a major-label debut that becomes, for those who ultimately learn to love it, the best record ever made. While the band's cocktail of tricky time changes, aggressive guitar bursts, and Craig Wedren’s effeminate falsetto proved inaccessible for the mainstream, many musicians found it utterly compelling". He lists Deftones, Incubus, Cursive, the Forms and the Dead Science as five bands influenced by the album.

Pitchfork's Tyler Grisham opines that the album "pushed the boundaries of mid-1990s indie rock in new and exhilarating directions." In his AllMusic review, Prato writes that despite its superior sound and production over earlier releases, Pony Express Records was not a "sellout", stating that the record "challenges the listener in many ways: stop/start riffing ('X-French Tee Shirt'), oblique lyrics ('Earthquakes Come Home'), often dramatic, Freddie Mercury-like vocals ('Gang of $'), and everything-but-the-kitchen-sink song structures ('No Rm. 9, Kentucky'). The music is consistently unpredictable, mixing jazz, metal, art rock, folk, experimental, and alternative in the band's melting pot. And all of the songs boast strong melodies".

OK Go frontman Damian Kulash has cited Pony Express Record as one of his favorite albums.

== Track listing ==
All songs written by Craig Wedren, except where noted.

No.	Title	Writer(s)	Length
1.	"Hit Liquor"		4:08
2.	"Gang of $"	Wedren, Nathan Larson	3:45
3.	"9 Fingers on You"		2:41
4.	"Sweet Year Old"	Larson	4:52
5.	"Earthquakes Come Home"		3:44
6.	"Kissi Penny"		3:06
7.	"X-French Tee Shirt"		4:06
8.	"No RM. 9, Kentucky"	Wedren, Larson	5:34
9.	"Chakka"	Wedren, Larson	4:47
10.	"Own Me"	Larson	4:48
11.	"So Into You (Atlanta Rhythm Section cover)"	Buddy Buie, Dean Daughtry, Robert Nix	3:43
12.	"Trackstar"		6:47
13.	"Full Body Anchor"		1:50
Total length:			53:50

PonyExpressRecord.com exclusive MP3s

1. "Little by Little (vox)"
2. "Little by Little (no vox)"
3. "Circus Metal (PXR demo)"
4. "Kissi Penny (PXR demo)"
5. "Gang of $ (PXR demo)"
6. "X-French Tee Shirt (PXR demo)"

== Personnel ==
Personnel per booklet.

Band

- Craig Wedren – lead vocals, guitar
- Nathan Larson – guitar
- Stuart Hill – bass
- Adam Wade – drums

Production

- Ted Niceley – production
- Andy Wallace – mixing
- Bob Ludwig – mastering
- Michael Rippe – assistant engineer
- Steve Palmieri – engineer
- Steve Cisco – engineer (mix)
- Will Weems – artwork, photography
