= Hanukkah+ =

Compilation album by various artists
- Released: November 22, 2019
- Genre: Hanukkah music, Children's music
- Length: 34:38
- Label: Verve Forecast Records
- Producer: Randall Poster

Hanukkah+ is a compilation album featuring songs themed around the Jewish holiday of Hanukkah. (Note: The Hebrew word חֲנֻכָּה is variously transliterated into English as Chanukah, Chanukkah, Hanukah, and Hanukkah. For consistency, this article matches the spelling used in the album's title.) Music producer Randall Poster was inspired by the annual Hanukkah concerts put on by Yo La Tengo. Ira Kaplan, the frontman of the band, remarked that he felt the holiday "could use some spotlight". Although he is Jewish, not all of his bandmates are, but all enjoyed the challenge of playing eight nights in a row in contrast with "all the hoopla over Christmas".

Poster highlighted Jack Black's performance on the album as "the gift wrapping".

The album was sold at "nontraditional" retailers, such as synagogue gift shops.

== Track listing ==
No.	Title	Writer(s)	Artist	Length
1.	"Oh Hanukkah"	Traditional	Jack Black	1:55
2.	"Dreidels of Fire"	Adam Green, Michael Cummings	Adam Green	2:28
3.	"Eight Candles"	Sam Elwitt	Yo La Tengo	2:32
4.	"If It Be Your Will"	Leonard Cohen	HAIM	3:42
5.	"Sing It Now, Sing It Somehow"	Steve Drozd, Wayne Coyne	The Flaming Lips	3:26
6.	"Hanukkah In '96"	Alex Frankel, Chris McLaughlin	Alex Frankel	2:46
7.	"Give You Everything"	Greta Morgan Salpeter, Buzzy Lee	Buzzy Lee	3:42
8.	"Dedication"	Tommy Guerrero	Tommy Guerrero	2:55
9.	"Eight Nights A Week"	Loudon Wainright III	Loudon Wainwright III	2:56
10.	"Hanukkah Dance"	Woody Guthrie	Watkins Family Hour	1:54
11.	"Sanctuary"	Craig Wedren	Craig Wedren	3:51
12.	"Chad Gadya"	Traditional	Jack Black	2:35
