= Rainn Wilson =

American actor (born 1966)

- Wilson at GalaxyCon Richmond in 2025
- Born: Rainn Percival Dietrich Wilson; January 20, 1966 (age 60); Seattle, Washington, U.S.
- Other name: Rainnfall Heat Wave Rising Sea Levels Wilson (social media)
- Education: University of Washington (BFA); New York University (MFA)
- Occupations: Actor; comedian; podcaster; producer; writer
- Years active: 1993–present
- Spouse: Holiday Reinhorn (m. 1995)
- Children: 1

Rainn Percival Dietrich Wilson (born January 20, 1966) is an American actor. He starred as Dwight Schrute on NBC's American adaptation of The Office from 2005 to 2013 and received three consecutive Emmy Award nominations for Outstanding Supporting Actor in a Comedy Series for the role.

Wilson began acting at the University of Washington. Following his 1986 graduation from NYU, he worked in theater in New York City. He made his film debut in Galaxy Quest (1999), followed by supporting parts in Almost Famous (2000), and House of 1000 Corpses (2003). He also had a recurring part as Arthur Martin in the HBO series Six Feet Under from 2003 to 2005.

Wilson's other film credits include lead roles in the comedies The Rocker (2008) and Super (2010), and supporting roles in the horror films Cooties (2014) and The Boy (2015). In 2009, he was heard in the animated science fiction film Monsters vs. Aliens as the villain Gallaxhar, and voiced Gargamel in Smurfs: The Lost Village (2017). He has had the guest-starring role of Harry Mudd on Star Trek: Discovery (2017) and Star Trek: Short Treks (2018), and a supporting role in The Meg (2018). From 2018 to 2021, he had a recurring role as Trevor on seasons 6–8 of the CBS sitcom Mom. He is also the voice of Lex Luthor in the DC Animated Movie Universe. Outside of acting, Wilson published his autobiography, The Bassoon King, in 2015, and cofounded the digital media company SoulPancake in 2008. His 2023 book Soul Boom: Why We Need a Spiritual Revolution was a New York Times best seller, and since 2024 he has hosted the podcast Soul Boom, featuring celebrity guests like Mark Ruffalo, Bryan Cranston and Chelsea Handler as well as thinkers and theologians like Anne Lamott, Kate Bowler and Father Greg Boyle.

== Early life and education ==
Wilson's Freshman yearbook photo at Shorecrest High School

Wilson's senior yearbook photo at New Trier High School

Wilson was born on January 20, 1966, at the University of Washington Medical Center in Seattle, Washington, the son of Shay Cooper, a yoga teacher and actress, and Robert G. Wilson (1941–2020), a novelist, artist and business consultant who wrote the science fiction novel Tentacles of Dawn. Wilson is of part Norwegian ancestry. From ages three to five, he lived with his father and stepmother, Kristin, in Nicaragua before they returned to Seattle after their divorce. He attended Kellogg Middle School and Shorecrest High School in Shoreline, Washington, where he played the clarinet and bassoon in the school band. He transferred to and graduated from New Trier High School after his family moved to Wilmette, Illinois, to serve at the Baháʼí National Center.

Wilson attended Tufts University in Medford, Massachusetts, before transferring to the University of Washington in Seattle, where he graduated with a bachelor's degree in drama in 1986. He then enrolled in New York University's Graduate Acting Program at the Tisch School of the Arts where he graduated with an MFA in acting and was a member of The Acting Company. Between acting jobs in New York City, he drove a moving van to make ends meet.

Wilson worked extensively in the theater early in his career, performing with The Public Theater, The Acting Company, the Ensemble Studio Theatre, Playwrights Horizons, the Roundabout, and the Guthrie Theater, among others. He played one of the eight chorus members in Richard Foreman's 1996 production of Suzan-Lori Parks' Venus, and was nominated for three Helen Hayes Awards for Best Supporting Actor for his work at the Arena Stage.

== Career ==
=== 1997–2004: Early roles ===
Wilson first appeared onscreen in 1997 in an episode of the soap opera One Life to Live, followed by a supporting role in the television film The Expendables (1999). He made his feature film debut in Galaxy Quest (1999), followed by a minor supporting role in Cameron Crowe's Almost Famous (2000). In 2001, he played Dennis Van De Meer in When Billie Beat Bobby. In 2002, he was cast in a lead role in Rob Zombie's horror film House of 1000 Corpses (2003). Beginning in 2003, Wilson played Arthur Martin, an intern at Fisher & Diaz Funeral Home in HBO's Six Feet Under, earning a Screen Actors Guild award for best drama ensemble for the series. He also had minor roles in America's Sweethearts (2001) and the Melvin van Peebles biopic Baadasssss! (2003). He guest-starred in Law & Order: Special Victims Unit, CSI: Crime Scene Investigation, Entourage, Monk, Numbers, Charmed, Tim and Eric Awesome Show, Great Job, and Reno 911!

=== 2005–2013: The Office and recognition ===
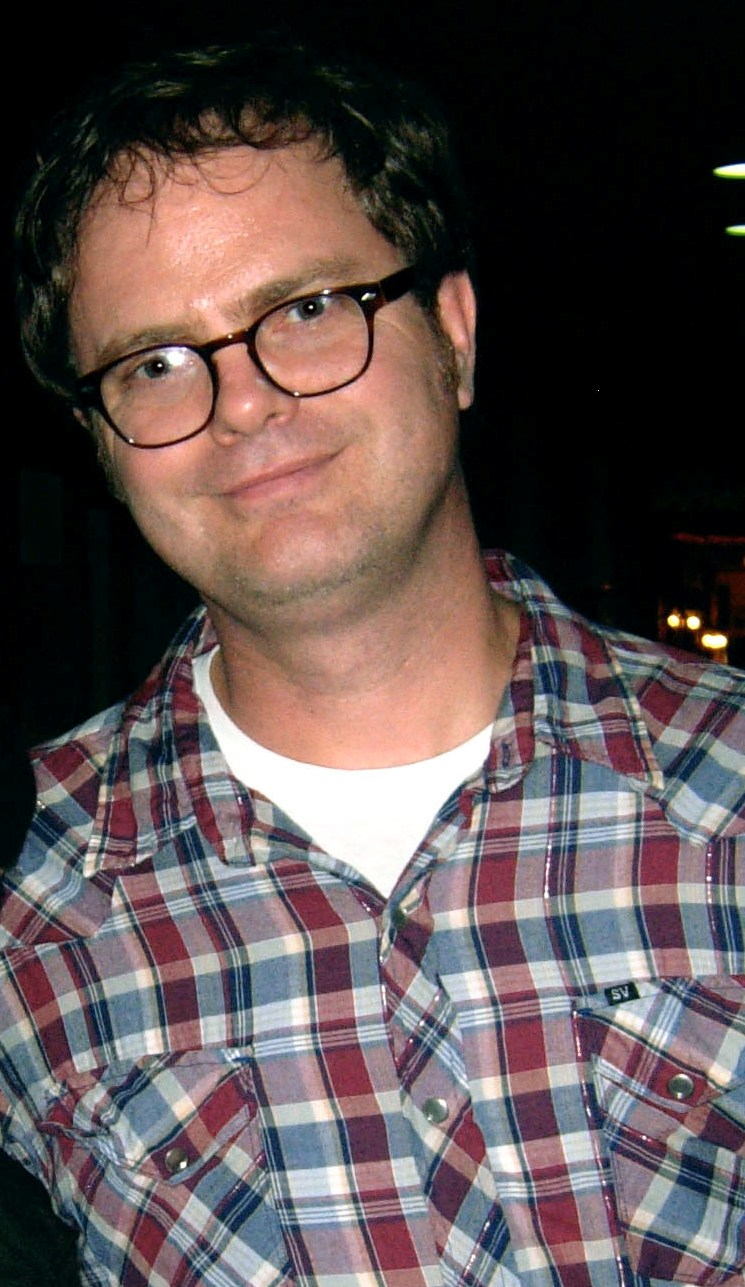
Wilson in 2008

In 2005, Wilson appeared in the action-adventure film Sahara. The same year, he was cast as neurotic sales representative Dwight Schrute in the network series The Office, for which he was nominated for Emmy Awards for Best Supporting Actor in 2007, 2008 and 2009, and won two SAG awards as part of Best Comedy Ensemble on the series. As well as acting on the series, he directed three episodes: "The Cover-Up" (season 6), "Classy Christmas" (season 7) and "Get the Girl" (season 8).

On February 24, 2007, Wilson hosted Saturday Night Live, becoming the second The Office cast member to host (after Steve Carell).

Wilson starred in the Fox Atomic comedy The Rocker (2008). In 2009 he joined the voice cast of DreamWorks Animation film Monsters vs. Aliens as villainous alien overlord Gallaxhar; and was featured in Transformers: Revenge of the Fallen, playing a university professor. In 2010, he had the lead role of the unhinged protagonist in Super. Critic Roger Ebert faulted the script, but praised Wilson's performance: "[Wilson] never seems to be trying to be funny, and that's a strength."

For his role of Paul, the bereft father, in Hesher (2011), Roger Ebert said of Wilson's work: “He has that rare quality in an actor, an uncanny presence. There are a few like him (Jack Nicholson, Christopher Walken, Bill Murray) who need only to look at something to establish an attitude toward it."

=== 2014–present: continued film and television ===
In 2014, Wilson had roles in the independent horror comedy Cooties and the thriller The Boy (2015). In the Fox crime-drama series Backstrom, he played Everett Backstrom, an offensive, self-destructive detective, based on Leif G. W. Persson's Swedish book series of the same name. Wilson was also one of the show's producers. It was cancelled by Fox after 13 episodes. In 2016, Wilson appeared as a guest star on the TV series Roadies.

Wilson at GalaxyCon Richmond in 2025

In 2017, Wilson voiced Gargamel in the 2017 animated reboot of Smurfs: The Lost Village for Sony Pictures Animation. He also starred in the independent comedy film Permanent, directed by Colette Burson and produced by 2929 Entertainment. Wilson starred in Shimmer Lake (2017) for Netflix and The Meg (2018), which grossed over 500 million at the box office for Warner Brothers.

Wilson was cast in the guest role of Harry Mudd in Star Trek: Discovery, and directed and starred in the Star Trek: Short Treks episode "The Escape Artist". He has voiced Lex Luthor in various DC animated films, including The Death of Superman, Reign of the Supermen, Batman: Hush, and Justice League Dark: Apokolips War.

In 2019, Wilson appeared in the independent drama Blackbird, and in 2020 starred in the independent thriller Don't Tell a Soul. In 2020, he was also a series regular in the Amazon Original Series Utopia as virologist Dr. Michael Sterns. On October 10, 2019, he was featured in the 30-minute YouTube documentary Laughing Matters, created by SoulPancake in collaboration with Funny or Die, wherein a variety of comedians discuss mental health. Wilson voiced the villain, a Las Vegas showman known as the Leapin' Lord of the Leotard, in the animated film Hitpig!, released in North America in November 2024. In 2020, he executive-produced and narrated the Netflix documentary series We Are the Champions.

Wilson played Trevor Wells, the recurring therapist to Bonnie (Allison Janney) on nine episodes of the CBS sitcom Mom. He was also cast in mystery series Dark Winds on AMC. In 2023, Wilson appeared in four episodes of the Apple TV+ miniseries Lessons in Chemistry as Phil Lebensmal, the abrasive owner and manager of the television station KCTV, opposite Brie Larson. Decider wrote that Wilson's "line delivery, inflections, cutting tone, and palpable emotion leave you wanting more."

Wilson presented the travel series Rainn Wilson and the Geography of Bliss in 2023 for Peacock. Wilson's other streaming credits include a role in Jerry & Marge Go Large for Paramount+, and a loose depiction of Dr. Demento in Weird: The Al Yankovic Story. Wilson played the lead role of Randy, a burned-out Los Angeles paramedic working his final 24-hour shift, in the buddy comedy film Code 3 (2025), opposite Lil Rel Howery and Aimee Carrero. Screen Rant called it "a stunning film that boasts a career-defining performance for Rainn Wilson", and Clint Worthington of RogerEbert.com wrote that Wilson's "innate dryness as a performer allows him to flit between grim joke and exhausted confession with admirable fluidity." The New York Times included it among five action films to stream, calling Wilson and Howery "a fantastic double act, making much of 'Code 3' a witty buddy comedy."

In 2026, Wilson played George, a wealthy benefactor of a dance company, opposite Amy Adams in Kornél Mundruczó's drama At the Sea, which premiered in competition at the 76th Berlin International Film Festival.

As of 2026, Wilson is filming a feature-length faith documentary, tentatively titled The Notorious G.O.D., exploring what God means in the modern world; as part of the project he rehearsed with the Tabernacle Choir at Temple Square in Salt Lake City.

Rainn Wilson and Aasif Mandvi backstage at the Geffen Theater before a performance of Waiting for Godot

In 2017 Wilson appeared in a screen adaptation of the play Thom Pain: Based on Nothing which had been performed at the Geffen Playhouse. In late 2024, Wilson played Vladimir opposite Aasif Mandvi's Estragon in a revival of Samuel Beckett's Waiting for Godot at the Geffen Playhouse in Los Angeles, directed by Judy Hegarty Lovett and produced with Gare St Lazare Ireland. Wilson portrayed Caldwell B. Cladwell in Urinetown during a limited run production at New York City Center as a part of their Encores! series in early 2025.

== Other ventures ==
Wilson co-founded the website and YouTube channel SoulPancake with Joshua Homnick and Devon Gundry in 2008. As of February 20, 2019, the channel had over 3 million subscribers and 557 million video views. In 2016 the channel was purchased by Participant Media.

Wilson co-wrote SoulPancake: Chew on Life's Big Questions (2010). In 2015, he published The Bassoon King, a humorous memoir of his personal life, career and faith. His 2023 book Soul Boom: Why We Need a Spiritual Revolution was a New York Times best seller, and was followed in 2025 by the Soul Boom Workbook: Spiritual Tools for Modern Living, co-written with SoulPancake co-founder Shabnam Mogharabi.

Wilson is a climate-change activist. He visited Greenland in 2019 with Arctic Basecamp, whose Advisory Board he also serves on. During the trip he shot the web docuseries The Idiot’s Guide to Climate Change for SoulPancake's YouTube channel.

In 2021, Wilson voiced the title character in the comedy audio series Dark Air with Terry Carnation. The podcast series is based on his character Terry Carnation from the Radio Rental podcast, created by Payne Lindsey.

Wilson also competed in Chess.com's PogChamps 3 chess competition, finishing in second place after a tiebreaker game with French streamer Sardoche.

In April 2024, Wilson launched a weekly long-form interview podcast titled Soul Boom w/ Rainn Wilson, released on YouTube and podcast platforms, featuring conversations about spirituality, mental health and societal transformation.

== Personal life ==
Wilson at Los Angeles Comic Con in 2026

Wilson is married to writer Holiday Reinhorn, whom he met in an acting class at the University of Washington. They married on the Kalama River in Washington in 1995, and have a son, Walter, born in 2004. They have a home outside of Sisters, Oregon, and a house in Los Angeles. Their animals have included pit bulls; two Vietnamese pot-bellied pigs, Snortington and Amy; a donkey named Chili Beans; and a zonkey named Derek.

Wilson and his family are members of the Baháʼí Faith. The website Baháʼí Blog, which is popular in the Bahá’í community, hosts Wilson's podcast, the Baháʼí Blogcast, for which he interviews Baha’í celebrities, such as Justin Baldoni, about the intersection of their faith and work.

On Bill Maher's Real Time, Wilson described himself as a diverse independent, having voted for Republican, Green and Democratic candidates. In 2008, he said he regretted the statement: "It was kind of a mistake, I don’t want to talk politics. […] The process of politics is so deeply corrupt on so many levels. Even the greatest candidate in the world couldn’t really make that much of a difference. But people with compassionate hearts can make the world a better place." However, Wilson does vote.

Wilson's charitable works include fundraising for the Mona Foundation, a Bahá’í-inspired charity operating in developing countries. In 2013, he co-founded Lidè Haiti, an educational initiative that uses the arts and literacy to empower adolescent girls in rural Haiti. As of 2024, the group works in 13 locations with over 500 girls, providing scholarships to many of them.

On November 10, 2022, Wilson changed his name on social media to Rainnfall Heat Wave Rising Sea Levels Wilson in an effort to raise awareness about climate change, though he did not change his legal name.

As a native of Seattle, Wilson is an avid fan of the NFL's Seattle Seahawks, having made several appearances on the team's behalf.

== Filmography ==
Key
†	Denotes works that have not yet been released

=== Film ===
Year	Title	Role	Notes
1999	Galaxy Quest	Lahnk	
2000	Almost Famous	David Felton	
2001	America's Sweethearts	Dave O'Hanlon	
2002	Full Frontal	Brian	
2003	House of 1000 Corpses	Bill Hudley	
2003	Baadasssss!	Bill Harris	
2005	The Life Coach	Dr. Watson Newmark	
2005	Sahara	Rudi Gunn	
2006	My Super Ex-Girlfriend	Vaughn Haige	
2007	The Last Mimzy	Larry White	
2007	Juno	Rollo	
2008	The Rocker	Robert 'Fish' Fishman	
2009	Monsters vs. Aliens	Gallaxhar	Voice
2009	Transformers: Revenge of the Fallen	Professor Colan	Cameo
2010	The New Recruits	Narrator	
2010	Super	Frank Darbo / The Crimson Bolt	Also executive producer
2010	Hesher	Paul Forney	
2010	Peep World	Joel Meyerwitz	
2013	The Stream	Adult Ernest	
2014	Cooties	Wade Johnson	
2015	Uncanny	Castle	
2015	The Boy	William Colby	Also executive producer Nominated – Fangoria Chainsaw Award for Best Supporting Actor
2016	Army of One	Agent Simons	
2017	Permanent	Jim Dixon	
2017	Smurfs: The Lost Village	Gargamel	Voice
2017	Shimmer Lake	Andy Sikes	
2017	Thom Pain	Thom Pain	Ccreen adaptation of the play Thom Pain: Based on Nothing
2018	The Death of Superman	Lex Luthor	Voice
2018	The Meg	Jack Morris	
2018	Where in the Hell is the Lavender House?		Executive producer Documentary of Longmont Potion Castle
2019	Reign of the Supermen	Lex Luthor	Voice
2019	Brightburn	Frank Darbo / The Crimson Bolt	Cameo (photograph only)
2019	Batman: Hush	Lex Luthor	Voice
2019	Blackbird	Michael	
2020	Justice League Dark: Apokolips War	Lex Luthor	Voice
2020	Don't Tell a Soul	Hamby	
2020	Don't Look Back	George Reed	Cameo; Also known as Good Samaritan
2022	Jerry & Marge Go Large	Bill	
2022	Weird: The Al Yankovic Story	Dr. Demento	
2023	Ezra	Nick	
2024	Empire Waist	Mark	
2024	Hitpig!	Leapin' Lord of the Leotard	Voice
2025	Paradise Records	Creepy Guy	
2025	Deepfaking Sam Altman	Himself	Documentary
2025	Home Delivery	Cheyenne	
2025	Code 3	Randy	
2026	At the Sea	George	

=== Television ===
Year	Title	Role	Notes
1997	One Life to Live	Casey Keegan	
1999	The Expendables	Newman	Television film
2000	Road Rules: Maximum Velocity Tour	Roadmaster	Uncredited
2001	Charmed	Kierkan	Episode: "Coyote Piper"
2001	When Billie Beat Bobby	Dennis Van De Meer	Television film
2001	Dark Angel	Phil	Episode: "I and I Am a Camera"
2001	CSI: Crime Scene Investigation	Guy in Supermarket	Episode: "The Strip Strangler"
2002	Law & Order: Special Victims Unit	Janitor	Episode: "Waste"
2003	Monk	Walker Browning	Episode: "Mr. Monk Goes to the Ballgame"
2003–2005	Six Feet Under	Arthur Martin	13 episodes
2005	Numb3rs	Martin Grolsch	Episode: "Vector"
2005	Entourage	R. J. Spencer	Episode: "I Love You Too"
2005–2013	The Office	Dwight Schrute	201 episodes
2007	Saturday Night Live	Host	Episode: "Rainn Wilson/Arcade Fire"
2008	Tim and Eric Nite Live!	The Psychic	Episode: "1.8"
2008; 2010	Tim and Eric Awesome Show, Great Job!	Various	5 episodes
2009	Reno 911!	Calvin Robin Tomlinson	Episode: "Digging with the Murderer"
2010	Family Guy	Dwight Schrute	Voice, episode: "Excellence in Broadcasting"
2012	Rove LA	Himself	Episode: "Rainn Wilson/Sarah Wayne/The Miz"
2013	The High Fructose Adventures of Annoying Orange	Dr. Po	Voice, episode: "Orange James Orange"
2013	Comedy Bang! Bang!	Himself	Episode: "Rainn Wilson Wears a Short Sleeved Plaid Shirt & Colorful Sneakers"
2013	Arcade Fire in Here Comes The Night Time	Greeter; stage crew member	NBC special
2014–2018	Adventure Time	Rattleballs / Peacemaster	Voice, 4 episodes
2015	Backstrom	Detective Everett Backstrom	13 episodes
2016	Roadies	Bryce Newman	Episode: "The Bryce Newman Letter"
2017	Star Trek: Discovery	Harry Mudd	Guest role (2 episodes)
2018	Room 104	Jim Herbers	Episode: "Mr. Mulvahill"
2019	Star Trek: Short Treks	Harry Mudd / Harry Mudd (androids)	Also director; Episode: "The Escape Artist"
2019	Transparent	Arthur	Episode: "Transparent Musicale Finale"
2019–21	Mom	Dr. Trevor Wells	9 episodes
2020	Solar Opposites	Mouse Milk Farmer	Voice, episode: "Terry and Korvo Steal a Bear"
2020	Home Movie: The Princess Bride	Vizzini	Episode: "Chapter Two: The Shrieking Eels"
2020	Utopia	Michael Stearns	8 episodes
2020	We Are the Champions	Narrator	Also executive producer
2021	The Rookie	Himself	Episode: "True Crime"
2021	Explained	Narrator	Episode: "Chess"
2022	Dark Winds	Devoted Dan	3 episodes
2023	Rainn Wilson and the Geography of Bliss	Himself	Main role
2023	StoryBots: Answer Time	Cosmic Caller	Episode: "Fractions"
2023	Lessons in Chemistry	Phil Lebensmal	Recurring role (4 episodes)
2025	Rhett and Link's Wonderhole	Himself	Episode: "We Tested 1-Star Hotels"
2026	Studio C	Various characters	Episode: "#22.1"

=== Theatre ===
Year	Title	Role	Notes
1989	Titus Andronicus	Martius	Shakespeare in the Park
1989	Twelfth Night or What You Will	Ensemble	Shakespeare in the Park
1995	The Tempest	Kuroko	New York Shakespeare Festival Broadhurst Theatre
1996	Venus	Father	The Joseph Papp Public Theater
1997	London Assurance	Charles Courtly	Criterion Center Stage Right
2016	Thom Pain (based on nothing)	Thom Pain	Geffen Playhouse
2018	The Doppelgänger (an international farce)	Thomas Irdley / Jimmy Peterson	Steppenwolf Theatre
2024	Waiting for Godot	Vladimir	Geffen Playhouse
2025	Urinetown	Caldwell B. Cladwell	New York City Center

=== Video games ===
Year	Title	Role	Notes
2009	Monsters vs. Aliens	Gallaxhar	

== Awards and nominations ==
Rainn Wilson earned three consecutive Primetime Emmy nominations for Outstanding Supporting Actor in a Comedy Series as Dwight Schrute on The Office. He also won three Screen Actors Guild Awards for Outstanding Performance by an Ensemble—two for The Office and an earlier one for HBO’s Six Feet Under.

On April 26, 2024, Wilson received an honorary doctorate from Weber State University in Ogden, Utah, and delivered the university's commencement address to about 3,700 graduates. In 2025, Time named Wilson, as co-founder of the climate-communication nonprofit Climate Basecamp, one of six recipients of its TIME Earth Awards; he accepted the award at a ceremony in New York City on April 23, 2025. That October, the Environmental Media Association honored him with its Ongoing Commitment Award at its 35th annual awards gala. On November 8, 2025, the Temple of Understanding, an interfaith organization, honored him with its Juliet Hollister Award at its 65th-anniversary Global Interfaith Summit in New York. Later that month, the Charter for Compassion presented him with its Karen Armstrong Humanitarian Award at its virtual Global Gala. In 2026, the Religion Communicators Council named him the inaugural recipient of its Struchen Award, which recognizes work that elevates religious communication and spiritual consciousness beyond traditional boundaries of faith.

Year	Award	Category	Nominated work	Result
2004	Screen Actors Guild Awards	Outstanding Performance by an Ensemble in a Drama Series	Six Feet Under	Won
2007	Screen Actors Guild Awards	Outstanding Performance by an Ensemble in a Comedy Series	The Office	Won
2007	Teen Choice Awards	Choice TV Sidekick	The Office	Nominated
2007	Primetime Emmy Awards	Outstanding Supporting Actor in a Comedy Series	The Office	Nominated
2007	TV Guide Awards	Favorite TV Sidekick	The Office	Won
2007	TV Guide Awards	Favorite Frenemies	The Office	Won
2007	TV Guide Awards	Favorite Ensemble	The Office	Won
2008	Screen Actors Guild Awards	Outstanding Performance by an Ensemble in a Comedy Series	The Office	Won
2008	Primetime Emmy Awards	Outstanding Supporting Actor in a Comedy Series	The Office	Nominated
2009	Writers Guild of America Awards	Best Comedy/Variety – Specials	23rd Independent Spirit Awards	Won
2009	Screen Actors Guild Awards	Outstanding Performance by an Ensemble in a Comedy Series	The Office	Nominated
2009	Primetime Emmy Awards	Outstanding Supporting Actor in a Comedy Series	The Office	Nominated
2010	Satellite Awards	Best Supporting Actor – Series, Miniseries or Television Film	The Office	Nominated
2010	Screen Actors Guild Awards	Outstanding Performance by an Ensemble in a Comedy Series	The Office	Nominated
2011	Screen Actors Guild Awards	Outstanding Performance by an Ensemble in a Comedy Series	The Office	Nominated
2012	Screen Actors Guild Awards	Outstanding Performance by an Ensemble in a Comedy Series	The Office	Nominated
2013	Screen Actors Guild Awards	Outstanding Performance by an Ensemble in a Comedy Series	The Office	Nominated
2016	Fangoria Chainsaw Awards	Best Supporting Actor	The Boy	Nominated
2019	Daytime Emmy Awards	Outstanding Special Class – Short Format Daytime Program	Food Interrupted	Nominated
2024	Astra TV Awards	Best Supporting Actor in a Streaming Limited or Anthology Series or Movie	Weird: The Al Yankovic Story	Nominated

== Written publications ==
- Rainn Wilson, Devon Gundry, Golriz Lucina and Shabnam Mogharabi. SoulPancake: Chew on Life's Big Questions. 2010. Hachette Books, ISBN 978-1401310332
- Rainn Wilson. The Bassoon King. 2015. Dutton, ISBN 978-0-525-95453-8
- Rainn Wilson. Soul Boom: Why We Need a Spiritual Revolution. 2023. Hachette Books, ISBN 978-0-306-82827-0
- Rainn Wilson and Shabnam Mogharabi. Soul Boom Workbook: Spiritual Tools for Modern Living. 2025. Grand Central Publishing, ISBN 978-1-5387-7554-7
