= Matt Williams (Internet entrepreneur) =

American entrepreneur (born 1972)

- Born: August 21, 1972 (age 54); Dallas, Texas, U.S.
- Education: University of Arizona
- Occupation: CEO of Pro.com
- Known for: CEO of Digg.com, Amazon executive

Matt Williams (born August 21, 1972 in Dallas, Texas) is an American Internet entrepreneur and the CEO of Pro.com. Previous positions include CEO of Digg.com, executive roles at Amazon, and Entrepreneur-In-Residence at venture capital firm Andreessen Horowitz.

== Early life and education ==
Williams was born in Dallas, Texas, and grew up in the Pacific Northwest, attending Shorecrest High School near Seattle, Washington. His parents were both entrepreneurs: his father starting radio stations, including KUBE 93.3 in Seattle and his mother starting Lake Forest Park Montessori in North Seattle. Williams graduated from the Eller College of Management at the University of Arizona.

== Career ==
=== LiveBid.com ===
In 1996 Williams and high-school friend Sky Kruse cofounded Seattle-based LiveBid.com, a proprietary software site that partnered with traditional auction houses to stream their events online, allowing Internet bidders to participate in bidding. The firm was acquired by Amazon in 1999.

=== Amazon ===
Williams remained at Amazon until 2010, he occupied several executive roles, including General Manager of Payments. He was responsible for early iterations of various web products, including Amazon's Selling on Amazon and WebStore by Amazon.

In 2001, Williams initiated a partnership between Amazon and the Annual Today Show Holiday Drive, a project of the Today Show Charitable Foundation, Inc. The partnership allowed Amazon customers to select and purchase a wish list of toy products for needy children from the site.

=== Digg.com ===
In September 2010, Williams became CEO of social news aggregator Digg.com. He inherited a number of challenges: the technically marred release of site redesign Digg v4 had resulted in a decline in customer usage and an alienation of the site's core audience; at the same time, changes in the internet milieu - most particularly Google's search algorithm - had made Digg's news aggregation model less relevant. After the departure of former CEO Jay Adelson, founder Kevin Rose had run the company, making Williams the company's third CEO within a span of months.

During Williams' tenure, the firm's metrics began to rebound. Site engagement increased significantly: Diggs and time on site by 20%, the total number of comments submitted per day by 50%. Despite this, the company's burn rate remained high, resulting in layoffs of 40% of staff and cuts in operational costs in order to approach cash flow positive in 2011.

In July 2012, Williams completed the sale of Digg in three parts: some staff members were transferred to The Washington Post's SocialCode project for $12 million, a suite of patents were sold to LinkedIn for $4 million, and the Digg brand and website was sold to Betaworks for stock plus at least $500,000 cash.

=== Pro.com ===
In mid-2013, Williams became CEO of the Internet startup Pro.com, a home services marketplace where users receive instant price estimates from home professionals and schedule appointments online.

== Other activities ==
In 2012 Williams became Entrepreneur in Residence at the venture capital firm Andreessen Horowitz. Williams is a Member of the Board of Directors for SmartThings.
