= First Love, Last Rites (film) =

1997 American romantic drama film by Jesse Peretz

- Directed by: Jesse Peretz
- Screenplay by: David Ryan; Jesse Peretz
- Based on: First Love, Last Rites by Ian McEwan
- Produced by: Herbert Beigel; Scott Macaulay; Robin O'Hara
- Starring: Natasha Gregson Wagner; Giovanni Ribisi
- Cinematography: Tom Richmond
- Edited by: James Lyons
- Music by: Nathan Larson; Craig Wedren
- Production companies: Forensic Films; Toast Films
- Distributed by: Strand Releasing; Trimark Pictures
- Release dates: September 7, 1997 (TIFF); August 7, 1998 (U.S.)
- Running time: 94 minutes
- Country: United States
- Language: English
- Budget: $300,000
- Box office: $42,953

First Love, Last Rites is a 1997 American romantic drama film directed by Jesse Peretz in his directional debut and starring Natasha Gregson Wagner and Giovanni Ribisi. It is based on the short story of the same name by Ian McEwan and centers on the passionate love affair between a young couple over one Louisiana summer.

The film premiered at the Toronto International Film Festival in 1997 and received a limited release on August 7, 1998.

== Plot ==
During a summer in Louisiana, Joey and Sissel are two young lovers fresh out of high school entangled in a consuming love affair. How the couple met is not disclosed, but Joey is originally from Brooklyn and Sissel is a local. In a house on stilts by the river, the couple do little more than talk and have sex, with the occasional interruption by Sissel’s younger brother Adrian. Sissel’s parents are divorced. Her father Henry, a Vietnam War veteran, befriends Joey, and the two men look into trapping eels with the aim of selling them to sushi restaurants. Jealousy and communication issues start to creep into Joey and Sissel’s relationship.

== Cast ==
- Natasha Gregson Wagner as Sissel
- Giovanni Ribisi as Joey
- Eli Marienthal as Adrian
- Robert John Burke as Henry
- Jeannetta Arnette as Sissel's Mom

== Soundtrack ==
The film's soundtrack was composed and performed by Shudder to Think, with singers such as Cheap Trick's Robin Zander and The Smashing Pumpkins' Billy Corgan providing vocals for many of the tracks. Despite the film's poor reception, the soundtrack received positive reviews.

== Release ==
The film premiered at the Toronto Film Festival and went on to play the festival circuit, including the London Film Festival, the Seattle International Film Festival, and the International Film Festival Rotterdam, where it won the FIPRESCI Award for Best Direction. It also screened at the 1998 Sundance Film Festival.

== Reception ==
On Rotten Tomatoes the film has an approval rating of 40% based on reviews from 10 critics.

Criticisms hinged on the film’s narrative and heavy-handed symbolism. AllMovie opined, "The lack of a sufficient narrative doesn't help as the two characters become unable to communicate with each other, resulting in a heavily symbolic climax with a pesky rat. After the initial scene is set, First Love, Last Rites becomes almost painful to watch as it heads toward the inevitable conclusion, but at least it contains lush scenery and convincing atmosphere."

Emanuel Levy of Variety wrote the film "is good at illustrating how initial thrills of freedom and lust gradually turn into confusion, fear and anxiety", and "It’s always a challenge to make an excitingly dramatic film about ennui, a task that is only partially achieved by helmer Peretz", but ”In switching the locale of McEwan’s short story from an industrial seaside town in England to the hot Bayou country, Peretz…has also aborted the poignancy, irony and black humor that the original material possessed."

Though the story was criticized, the film’s atmosphere and visuals were praised. Stephen Holden wrote of The New York Times wrote, "Although the geographical shift makes for a film that is steeped in local color (this world of ruddy tattooed fishermen and houses on stilts and crushing humidity is so richly evoked you can almost smell the thick summer air), its main characters seem distinctly out of place." Ethan Alter of Film Journal complimented Jesse Peretz’ camera work and said he "has designed some very nice shots and his interesting use of color highlights his background in music-videos", but said the plot "bored him to tears" and criticized the lack of chemistry between its two leads.
