= Holiday Reinhorn =

American writer known for short stories

- Born: March 12, 1964 (age 62); Portland, Oregon, U.S.
- Education: University of Iowa; University of Washington
- Occupation: Writer
- Spouse: Rainn Wilson (m. 1995)
- Children: 1

Holiday Reinhorn (born March 12, 1964) is an American fiction writer known for her short stories.

== Biography ==
Reinhorn was born and raised in Portland, Oregon.

She is a graduate of the Iowa Writers' Workshop and the author of Big Cats, published by Free Press in 2005. Big Cats received largely positive notice in Seattle Times, Post Magazine, Kirkus Reviews and Publishers Weekly. It was a Powell's bestseller.

Her work has been published in Ploughshares, Zoetrope: All-Story, Gulf Coast, and many other literary magazines.

She is married to actor Rainn Wilson, whom she met while both were students at the University of Washington. The couple married on the Kalama River in Washington in 1995 and have one son, Walter (b. 2004). They are both adherents of the Baháʼí Faith. In 2009 Reinhorn was invited by Sean Penn's charity J/P Haitian Relief Organization to hold writing workshops for girls. While in Haiti she co-founded Lide (Haitian Creole for "leader" or "idea"), a foundation to support young women interested in writing and creative arts. Rather than the capital city, Port-au-Prince, Reinhorn chose the city of Gonaïves for its site, to "boost literacy and help the girls find dignity and learn life skills."

== Works ==
- Reinhorn, Holiday (2005). Big Cats. Simon and Schuster. ISBN 978-0-743-27294-0.
