= Justin Paperny =

American prison consultant, author, and criminal justice reform advocate

- Born: 1971 or 1972 (age 54–55); Encino, Los Angeles, California, U.S.
- Education: University of Southern California (BA, Psychology, 1997)
- Occupations: Prison consultant, author, nonprofit founder, speaker
- Known for: Co-founding White Collar Advice; Prison Professors Charitable Corporation; FBI Academy lecturer Criminal justice reform advocacy
- Works: Lessons from Prison (2009); Ethics in Motion (2010)
- Criminal charges: Conspiracy to commit mail, wire, and securities fraud (2007)
- Criminal penalty: 18 months federal prison
- Criminal status: Released (May 2009)
- Website: www.whitecollaradvice.com

Justin Paperny is an American prison consultant and former stockbroker who served 18 months in federal prison for securities fraud. Paperny now operates White Collar Advice, a consulting firm.

== Early life and education ==
Paperny attended Montclair Prep in Van Nuys, California where he played on the baseball team with Brad Fullmer. He then attended the University of Southern California (USC), where he played for the USC Trojans baseball team and graduated in 1997 with a Bachelor of Arts in psychology.

== Finance career ==
Paperny began his career in finance in 1997. He worked for firms including Merrill Lynch, Bear Stearns, and UBS Financial Services.

In February 2007, Paperny pleaded guilty to one count of conspiracy to commit mail, wire, and securities fraud related to the GLT Venture Fund scheme operated by hedge fund manager Keith G. Gilabert. As part of his plea agreement, Paperny admitted to misleading investors about the fund's performance and receiving kickbacks. He agreed to cooperate with federal investigators.

On February 25, 2008, U.S. District Judge Stephen V. Wilson sentenced Paperny to 18 months in federal prison and ordered him to pay $510,378 in restitution to victims. In a related civil case, the U.S. Securities and Exchange Commission alleged that Paperny earned $220,500 in commissions from the fraudulent scheme. He settled the charges without admitting or denying the SEC's allegations.

== Prison consulting career ==
Following his release from federal prison in 2009, Paperny wrote a memoir entitled Lessons from Prison and began advising defendants in white-collar cases. White Collar Advice was founded in 2008. Paperny has provided consultation and media commentary on numerous high-profile federal cases and appeared with well-known media figures such as Dr. Phil.

Paperny's past clients included actress Lori Loughlin, parents in the Varsity Blues college admissions scandal, and former cast member of The Real Housewives of Salt Lake City, Jen Shah.

== Published works ==
- Lessons from Prison (Etika LLC, 2009; reissued CreateSpace, 2016) – Memoir detailing his criminal case and prison experience
- Ethics in Motion (APS Publishing, 2010) – Analysis of ethical decision-making in business, used as required reading at USC Marshall School of Business
- Living Deliberately (with Michael G. Santos, 2019) – Guide for entrepreneurs and business owners on digital media strategies
- Prepare: What Defendants Need to Know About Lawyers, Mitigation, Sentencing, Prison, and the First Step Act (with Michael G. Santos, 2019) – Comprehensive guide to federal sentencing and prison preparation
