= Colette Burson =

American film director

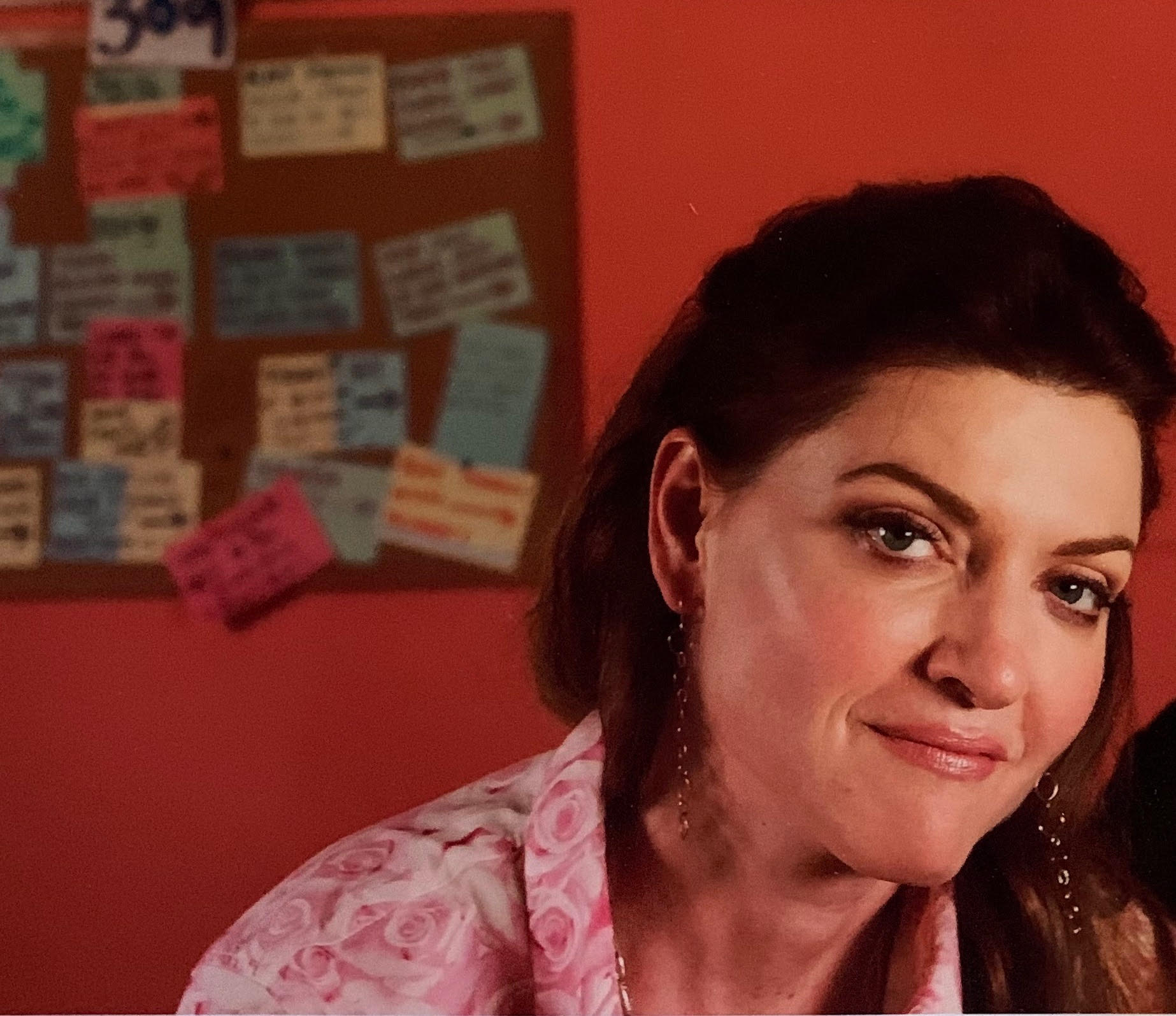
- Born: Colette Burson; June 22, 1970 (age 55)
- Education: University of Virginia (BA); New York University (MFA)
- Occupations: Director; producer; writer
- Notable work: Hung, The Riches, Permanent

Colette Burson (born June 22, 1970) is an American television writer, screenwriter, producer and director. She is the creator, executive producer and showrunner of the HBO television show, Hung. In 2021, she is adapting the best-selling novel The Growing Season by Sarah Frey for ABC, as well as writing the limited series Love Canal for Showtime, directed by Patricia Arquette. Past work on shows includes Los Espookys for HBO and The Riches for FX. She is also the writer and director of the 2017 film Permanent.

== Early life and education ==
Burson grew up in Abingdon, Virginia. She attended the University of Virginia, majoring in rhetoric and French, and went on to receive her MFA in dramatic writing from New York University's Tisch School of the Arts.

== Career ==
Burson was a founding member of the theater company the Playwrights Collective, working at the company from 1991 until 1999, along with Kate Robin, Eduardo Machado, Lucy Thurber, Dan Rybicky, Jennifer Farber Dulos, Carrie Luft, Dmitry Lipkin and Wendy Riss.

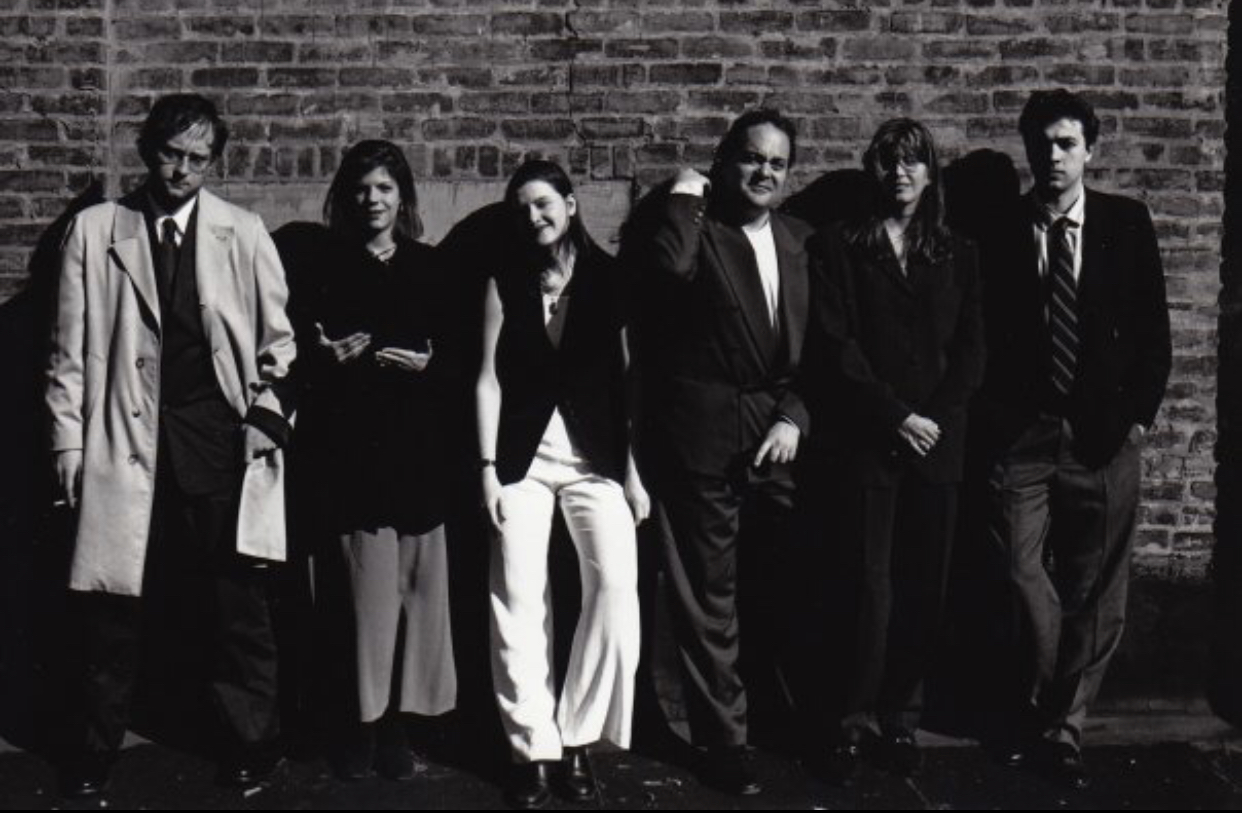
The Playwrights’ Collective Theater Company, circa 1998. From left to right: Tim Cunningham, Kate Robin, Colette Burson, Eduardo Machado, Jennifer Farber, Dmitry Lipkin

== Hung ==
Burson created Hung for HBO with her then-writing partner and now ex-husband Dmitry Lipkin. The show ran for three seasons, during which time Burson was nominated for a WGA award for Best New Series while Hung was nominated for four Golden Globes. The New York Times described Hung as “the most topical fictional programming on television” in 2010.

The show examined gender and racial diversity at a time when it was not commonly discussed or held up as a goal for television creators. By the third season of Hung, 6 out of 10 of the show's directors were women, including Burson, which according to an official Directors Guild of America study released in 2011 ranked it the #1 top cable show in terms of hiring female episodic directors. Hung was unusually feminist in both its approach to content as well as behind the scenes. Hung has been described as a "mixture of feminist sexual activism with capitalist entrepreneurship."

== Television ==
As a writer for television, Burson has written original comedy and drama pilots and episodes for Showtime, FX, NBC, and Canal+/Europa. She recently completed the pilot Retired for Paramount Television. In 2018, she served as Executive Producer on This Close (Sundance Now) and Consulting Producer on Los Espookys (HBO).

== Directing ==
Burson wrote and directed the short film BURP (2019), described as a "feminist horror fantasia". She also wrote and directed the 2017 feature film Permanent, produced by 2929 Entertainment. The film stars Academy Award-winner Patricia Arquette, Rainn Wilson, and Kira McLean. Burson's short film Little Black Boot, a Cinderella-like lesbian love story starring Jane Lynch as the evil stepmother, premiered at Sundance and won over ten national and international awards, including the Grand Prize from Planet Out and Best Short Film Prize from Logo Television, Additional directing credits include Coming Soon starring Mia Farrow and Ryan Reynolds (co-written with Kate Robin), as well as several episodes of Hung, including the season three premiere, "Don't Give Up on Detroit."

== Personal life ==
Burson was married to Hung co-creator Dmitry Lipkin for nine years before divorcing in 2015. They have two children together.
