= Kevin March (musician) =

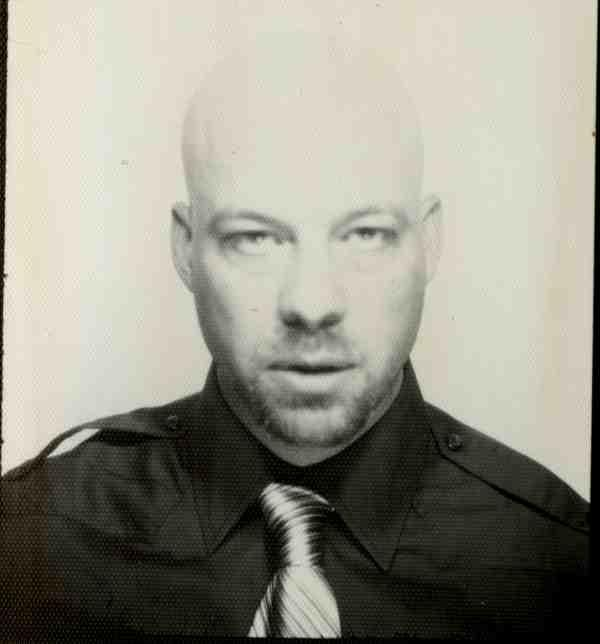

Background information
- Birth name: Kevin Daniel March
- Also known as: Kevin Williamson; Ryan Stone
- Genres: Indie rock
- Occupations: Musician; producer
- Instruments: Drums; vocals
- Years active: 1992–present
- Member of: Guided by Voices
- Formerly of: The Rentals; The Dambuilders; Those Bastard Souls; Shudder to Think

Kevin Daniel March (born May 12) is an American musician, record producer, and songwriter. March is known for his work as a drummer with Guided by Voices, Those Bastard Souls, Shudder to Think, and The Dambuilders. He has previously managed the band The Nowherenauts.

March has a daughter, Katherine, with his wife Bridget.
