= Jeff Levy-Hinte =

American film producer

- Born: Santa Monica, California
- Education: California State University, Northridge; University of Michigan
- Occupations: Film producer, Woodworker

Jeff Levy-Hinte (a.k.a. Jeffrey Kusama-Hinte) is an American film producer. He serves as the President of Antidote International Films (also known as Antidote Films), Inc. based in New York City. He produced The Kids Are All Right, co-written and directed by Lisa Cholodenko, which won the 68th Golden Globe Awards for Best Motion Picture, Comedy or Musical, and Best Performance by an Actress for Annette Bening.

== Biography ==
Jeffrey Levy-Hinte was born to a Jewish family in Santa Monica, California. He graduated from California State University, Northridge and the University of Michigan in Ann Arbor, Michigan.

He produced Mysterious Skin and The Hawk Is Dying. His other productions include Chain, Thirteen, Laurel Canyon, Wendigo, American Saint, and Limon. Prior to 2000, Levy-Hinte produced Lisa Cholodenko's film High Art and co-edited the Academy Award-winning documentary When We Were Kings. In 2003 Levy-Hinte was selected as one of Variety's "Producers to Watch".

Additionally, he produced the eco-horror thriller The Last Winter (released by IFC Films) and the documentary Bomb It, an investigation of graffiti covering street art from all around the world. He also produced Roman Polanski: Wanted and Desired, a documentary directed by Marina Zenovich. Winner of the Documentary Editing Award at the 2008 Sundance Film Festival, the film was released domestically by HBO and THINK Films and internationally through The Weinstein Company and the BBC. He made several documentaries, including Soul Power (produced and directed by Levy-Hinte) and The Dungeon Masters, both of which premiered at the 2009 AFI Dallas International Film Festival, the 2009 South by Southwest Film Festival and the 2008 Toronto International Film Festival. In 2013, he produced Fading Gigolo, starring Woody Allen and Sharon Stone.

He serves as the Chair of the Board for the Independent Features Project in New York City.

In 2003, Daily Variety reported Antidote's plans for a film adaptation of the JT LeRoy novel Sarah, to be directed by Steven Shainberg. According to The New York Times, when Shainberg learned that LeRoy was a literary persona and that Laura Albert was the actual author of Sarah, he decided "to make a 'meta-film,' a triple-layered movie that would blend the novel with the lives of its real and purported authors in a project he took to calling 'Sarah Plus.'" The Times also reported that this new project "required the rights to Laura Albert's story, rights that she in no uncertain terms refused to grant." In June 2007, Antidote sued Albert for fraud, claiming that a contract signed with LeRoy to make a feature film of Sarah was null and void. After a Manhattan jury found Albert liable in monetary damages for the tort of fraud because she had signed her nom de plume to the movie contract, The New York Times noted that Levy-Hinte said, "if Ms. Albert, who never made a fortune from her literary works, could not afford to pay the judgment, he might have to consider laying claim to the rights to her past and future books." Levy-Hinte's chief lawyer insisted, "Neither Jeff nor I want to ruin Laura Albert. We just want her to behave with a little more integrity." After an appeal, the damages awarded were reduced by settlement with Antidote in 2009, and Albert retained the rights to her books and her life story.

== Film productions ==
- High Art (1998)
- American Saint (2001)
- Ghosts of Attica (2001)
- Limon: A Life Beyond Words (2001)
- Wendigo (2001)
- Laurel Canyon (2002)
- Thirteen (2003)
- Mysterious Skin (2004)
- Chain (2004)
- The Hawk Is Dying (2006)
- The Last Winter (2006)
- Bomb It (2007)
- The Dungeon Masters (2008)
- Soul Power (2008)
- Roman Polanski: Wanted and Desired (2008)
- Cropsey (2009)
- The Kids Are All Right (2010)
- Camp Victory, Afghanistan (2010)
- Fading Gigolo (2013)
