= Mary Jane Skalski =

American film producer

- Education: University of Michigan
- Occupation: Film producer

Mary Jane Skalski is a film producer based in New York City and winner of the Independent Spirit John Cassavetes Award for The Station Agent. She attended University of Michigan during the late 1980s and moved to New York, NY upon graduation. Her first job in film making was with the Association of American Independent Video and Filmmakers (AIVF). In 2018 she was appointed as Executive Vice-President (Creative Affairs) for Echo Lake Entertainment.

== Filmography ==
- American Animals (2018) (producer)
- Wilson (2017) (producer)
- The Cobbler (2014) (producer)
- Very Good Girls (2013) (producer)
- The Moment (2013) (producer)
- Putzel (2012) (executive producer)
- Hello I Must Be Going (2012) (producer)
- Win Win (2011) (producer)
- Pariah (2011) (executive producer)
- Dare (2009) (producer)
- Against the Current (2009) (producer)
- The Visitor (2007) (producer)
- Fur: An Imaginary Portrait of Diane Arbus (2006) (co-producer)
- The Hawk Is Dying (2006) (producer)
- Mysterious Skin (2004) (producer)
- Chain (2004) (producer)
- The Station Agent (2003) (producer)
- The Jimmy Show (2001) (producer)
- Gina, an Actress, Age 29 (2001) (producer)
- Conrad & Butler Take a Vacation (2000) (producer)
- Lola and Billy the Kid (1999) (associate producer)
- Trick (1999) (executive producer)
- The Lifestyle (1999) (co-producer/executive producer)
- Wonderland (1997) (co-producer)
- The Myth of Fingerprints (1997) (producer)
- Up On the Roof (1997) (producer)
- Greetings from Africa (1996) (producer)
- The Brothers McMullen (1995) (associate producer)
- Central Park (1994) (producer)
