= Lisa Cholodenko =

American screenwriter and director

- Born: Los Angeles, California, U.S.
- Education: San Francisco State University; Columbia University
- Occupations: Film director, screenwriter
- Years active: 1994–present
- Notable work: High Art; Laurel Canyon; The Kids Are All Right; Olive Kitteridge; Unbelievable
- Children: 1

Lisa Cholodenko is an American screenwriter and director. Cholodenko wrote and directed the films High Art (1998), Laurel Canyon (2002), and The Kids Are All Right (2010). She has also directed television, including the miniseries Olive Kitteridge (2014) and Unbelievable (2019). She has been nominated for an Academy Award and a Golden Globe and has won an Emmy and a DGA Award.

== Early life and education ==
Cholodenko is from the San Fernando Valley, and grew up in a liberal Jewish family. Her paternal grandfather emigrated from USSR.

Cholodenko received a BA in anthropology and ethnic studies from San Francisco State University, where she was a teaching assistant for Angela Davis. In the early 1990s, she was an apprentice editor on John Singleton's Boyz n the Hood. She also worked as an assistant editor on Beeban Kidron's Used People, Brett Leonard's The Lawnmower Man, and Gus Van Sant's To Die For. In 1997, Cholodenko received an MFA from Columbia University School of the Arts in screenwriting and directing. While at Columbia, Cholodenko wrote and directed a number of short films, including Souvenir (1994) and Dinner Party (1997), which won the British Film Institute's Channel 4 TX prize and aired on UK, French, and Swiss television.

== Career ==
=== Film ===
==== High Art (1998) ====
While at Columbia, Cholodenko wrote and directed her feature film debut High Art. High Art won the Waldo Salt Screenwriting Award at the Sundance Film Festival as well as the National Society of Film Critics award for Ally Sheedy's performance. premiered at Cannes Director's Fortnight and was distributed by October Films.

==== Laurel Canyon (2002) ====
Her next film Laurel Canyon, starring Frances McDormand, Christian Bale, and Kate Beckinsale, premiered at Cannes Director's Fortnight. It was nominated for multiple Independent Spirit Awards and was distributed by Sony Pictures Classics.

==== Cavedweller (2004) ====
Cholodenko directed the 2004 film Cavedweller for Showtime. It earned Independent Spirit Award nominations for cast members Kyra Sedgwick and Aidan Quinn.

==== The Kids are All Right (2010) ====
Cholodenko next co-wrote and directed The Kids Are All Right. She was nominated for an Academy Award for Best Original Screenplay. The film was nominated for another 3 Academy Awards, including Best Picture, and won a Golden Globe for Best Picture, Comedy or Musical. Filmed in 23 days, Cholodenko directed the film on a $3.5 million budget, a much smaller amount than her fellow 2011 Oscar nominees. The film was made with three different sources of equity financing, with Focus Features picking up the film for distribution.

=== Television ===
In 2014, Cholodenko directed the HBO four-part mini-series Olive Kitteridge starring Frances McDormand and Richard Jenkins. Olive Kitteridge is based on the novel of the same name by Elizabeth Strout. Bill Murray, Jesse Plemons, Zoe Kazan, and John Gallagher Jr. co-starred. Olive Kitteridge premiered at the 2014 Venice Film Festival to overwhelmingly positive reviews. The show received widespread critical acclaim when it premiered on television in November. It received three Golden Globe nominations, and Cholodenko received a Directors Guild Award and a Primetime Emmy Award for Outstanding Directing for her work on the miniseries.

In 2018, Cholodenko was an executive producer and directed the first three episodes of Netflix's limited series Unbelievable. Based on the 2015 news article "An Unbelievable Story of Rape" written by Christian Miller and Ken Armstrong, the show received universal acclaim when it premiered in October 2019. It received three Golden Globe nominations, three Emmy nominations, and won the Peabody Award.

Cholodenko has also directed episodes of Homicide: Life on the Street, Six Feet Under, The L Word, Hung, and Here and Now. Cholodenko was an executive producer, and directed the first episode, of the 2015 eight-part NBC miniseries The Slap, which was based on the Australian miniseries of the same name.

Cholodenko directed and executive produced the first two episodes of the Hulu series The Girl from Plainville, starring Elle Fanning.

== Personal life ==
Cholodenko has a son with musician Wendy Melvoin.

== Filmography ==
Short film

| Year | Title | Director | Writer | Producer | Notes |
|---|---|---|---|---|---|
| 1994 | Crawl | | | Yes | |
| 1994 | Souvenir | Yes | Yes | Yes | |
| 1997 | Dinner Party | Yes | Yes | | Also editor |

Feature film

| Year | Title | Director | Writer |
|---|---|---|---|
| 1998 | High Art | Yes | Yes |
| 2002 | Laurel Canyon | Yes | Yes |
| 2004 | Cavedweller | Yes | |
| 2010 | The Kids Are All Right | Yes | Yes |

TV

| Year | Title | Director | Executive Producer | Notes |
|---|---|---|---|---|
| 1999 | Homicide: Life on the Street | Yes | | Episode "The Same Coin" |
| 2001 | Six Feet Under | Yes | | Episode "Familia" |
| 2002 | Push, Nevada | Yes | | Episode "The Letter of the Law" |
| 2005 | The L Word | Yes | | Episode "Lynch Pin" |
| 2010 | Hung | Yes | | Episode "Beaverland" |
| 2014 | Olive Kitteridge | Yes | | Episodes "Pharmacy", "Incoming Tide", "A Different Road" and "Security" |
| 2015 | The Slap | Yes | Yes | Episode "Hector" |
| 2018 | Here and Now | Yes | | Episodes "Fight, Death" and "Wake" |
| 2019 | Unbelievable | Yes | Yes | 3 episodes |
| 2022 | The Girl from Plainville | Yes | Yes | Episode "Star-Crossed Lovers and Things Like That" |

== Awards and nominations ==
- 2010: Women in Film, Dorothy Arzner Directors Award
- 2011: Independent Spirit Awards, Best Screenplay for The Kids Are All Right – with Stuart Blumberg
- 2011: Writers Guild of America, Best Original Screenplay (nominee) for The Kids Are All Right – with Stuart Blumberg

== See also ==
- List of female film and television directors
- List of lesbian filmmakers
- List of LGBTQ-related films directed by women
- List of LGBTQ Academy Award winners and nominees
