= Antidote Films =

American independent film production company

Antidote International Films, Inc.
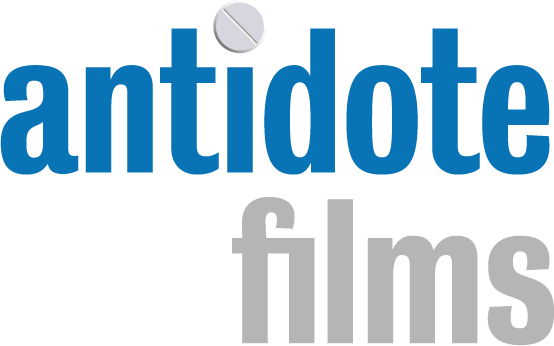
- Type: Independent Film Company
- Headquarters: New York, NY, United States
- Owner: Jeff Levy-Hinte
- Website: http://www.antidotefilms.com

Antidote Films, also known as Antidote International Films, Inc., is an independent film production company founded by producer Jeff Levy-Hinte based in the Hudson Square neighborhood of New York City. In 2008, Antidote completed several documentaries, including Soul Power and The Dungeon Masters, both of which premiered at the 2008 Toronto International Film Festival.

Antidote produced Roman Polanski: Wanted and Desired, a documentary directed by Marina Zenovich, which was nominated for the Grand Jury Prize and winner of the Documentary Editing Award at the 2008 Sundance Film Festival, the film will be released domestically by HBO and internationally through The Weinstein Company.

Prior to this, Antidote produced several narrative films until The Last Winter, when the company shifted its focus to documentary.

Other Antidiote productions include the eco-horror thriller The Last Winter; The Hawk Is Dying, adapted from Harry Crews' novel and directed by Julian Goldberger; Mysterious Skin, directed by Gregg Araki; and Thirteen, directed by Catherine Hardwicke.

In 2003, Daily Variety announced Antidote's plans for a film adaptation of the JT LeRoy novel 'Sarah', to be directed by Steven Shainberg. According to The New York Times, when Shainberg learned that JT LeRoy was a literary persona and that Laura Albert was the actual author of Sarah, he decided "to make a 'meta-film,' a triple-layered movie that would blend the novel with the lives of its real and purported authors in a project he took to calling 'Sarah Plus.'" The Times also reported that this new project "required the rights to Laura Albert's story, rights that she in no uncertain terms refused to grant." In June 2007 Antidote sued Albert for fraud, claiming that a contract signed with JT LeRoy to make a feature film of Sarah was null and void. After a Manhattan jury found Albert liable in monetary damages for the tort of fraud because she had signed her nom de plume to the movie contract, The New York Times noted that Jeffrey Levy-Hinte said, “if Ms. Albert, who never made a fortune from her literary works, could not afford to pay the judgment, he might have to consider laying claim to the rights to her past and future books.” Levy-Hinte's chief lawyer insisted, "Neither Jeff nor I want to ruin Laura Albert. We just want her to behave with a little more integrity." After an appeal, the damages awarded were reduced by settlement with Antidote in 2009, and Laura Albert retained the rights to her books and her life story.

== Film productions ==
- The Kids Are All Right (2010)
- Soul Power (2008)
- The Dungeon Masters (2008)
- Roman Polanski: Wanted and Desired (2008)
- Bomb It (2007)
- The Last Winter (2006)
- Mysterious Skin (2004)
- Chain (2004)
- Thirteen (2003)
- Laurel Canyon (2002)
- American Saint (2001)
- Ghosts of Attica (2001)
- Limon: A Life Beyond Words (2001)
- Wendigo (2001)
- High Art (1998)
