= Alejandro Alcondez =

American actor (born 1970)

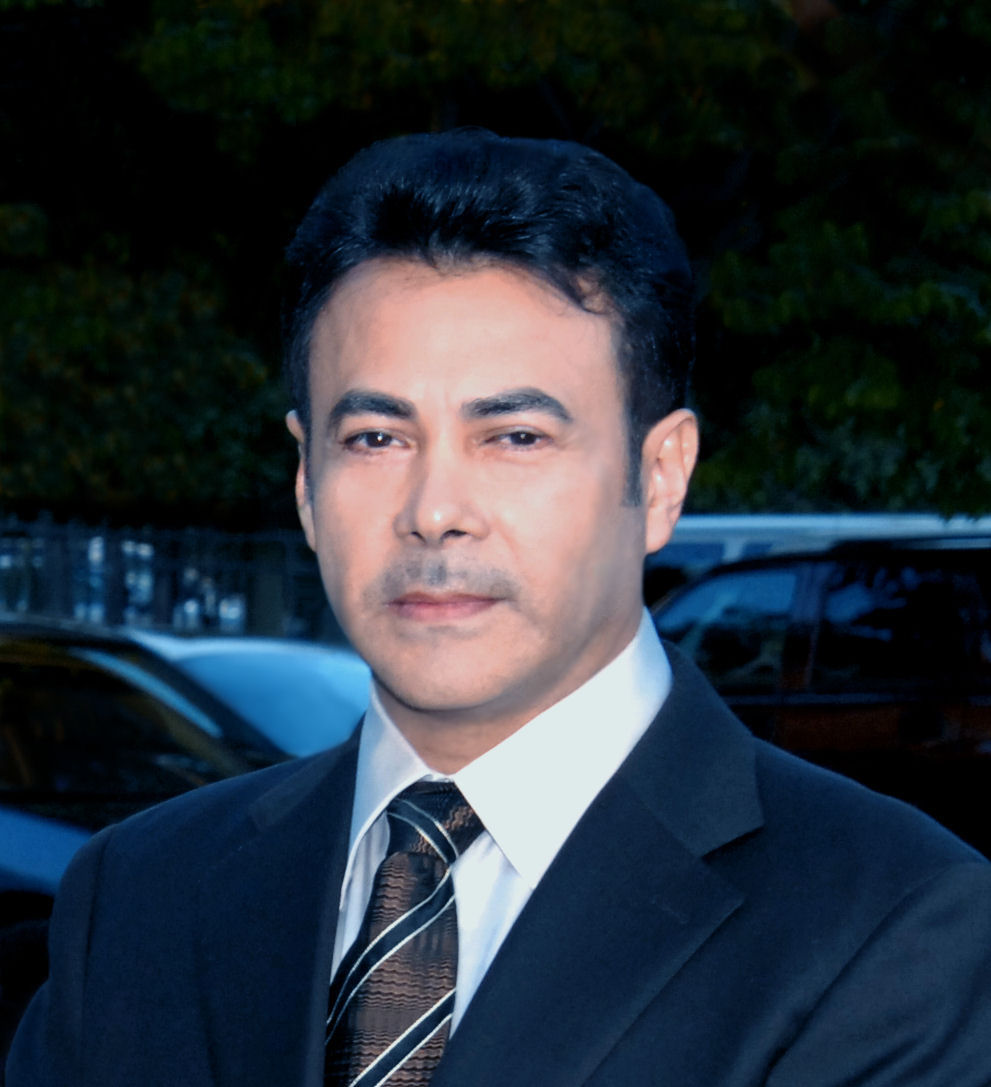
- Born: August 3, 1970 (age 55); Guadalajara, Jalisco, Mexico
- Occupations: Actor, film director, film producer, screenwriter
- Years active: 1990–present
- Notable work: Cielito Lindo: "Beautiful Heaven"

Alejandro Alcondez (born August 3, 1970) Is a Mexican/American Actor, Filmmaker, Film Director, Film Producer and Screenwriter. Born in Jalisco, Mexico, Alcondez moved to Hollywood, California in the early 1990s. His acting career began in theater production plays, he then moved on to produce and write his own Mexican films Impacto de Muerte, Furia Salvaje and El Bronko Negro, which were distributed by his company Producciones Alejandro Alcondez.

His most recent American film "Cielito Lindo" Beautiful Heaven (produced, written and directed by Alejandro Alcondez) was written especially for Alcondez where he plays the lead role of Pablo Pastor. This film was released by his own production and distribution company Alejandro Alcondez Pictures

== Biography ==
=== Career in Mexico ===
Alejandro Alcondez founded Producciones Alejandro Alcondez and decided to produce his first film. Alejandro called upon Mexican actor Mario Almada (actor) he produced the film he also wrote the story and had a lead part alongside Mario Almada. The film was directed by Alberto Mariscal.

Alcondez continued to film as a producer, writer, director and lead actor in a large number of films alongside Mexican actors Luis Aguilar, Sergio Goyri, Jorge Reynoso, Hugo Stiglitz, Fernando Almada, Fernando Saenz, Manuel Ojeda, Luis de Alba, Cesar Bono, Jaime Fernández, Miguel Angel Rodriguez, Bernabe Melendrez, Los Tucanes de Tijuana, Patricia Rivera, Roxana San Juan, Karla Barahona, Rebeca Silva, Lorena Velasquez, Lina Santos, and Rosenda Bernal, just to name a few. Alcondez has also starred in many film productions produced by Mr. Delfino Lopez of Baja Films.

=== Career in Hollywood ===
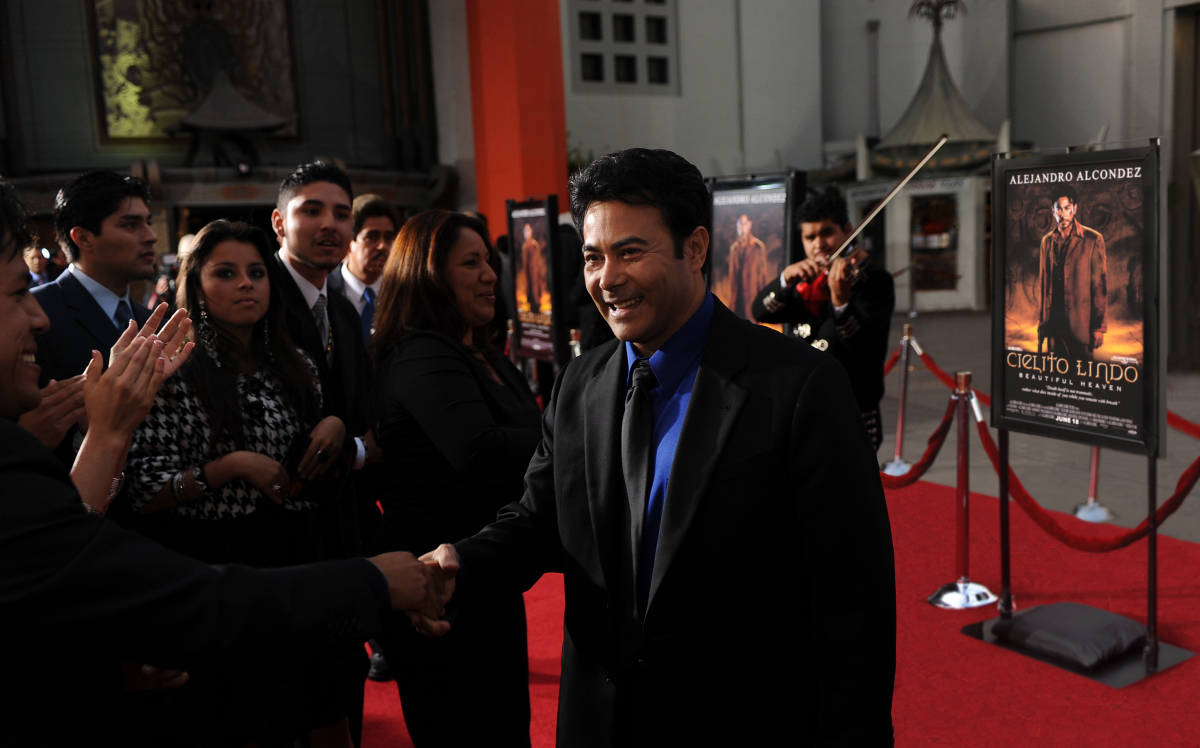
Alejandro Alcondez Cielito Lindo Premiere at Grauman's Chinese Theatre

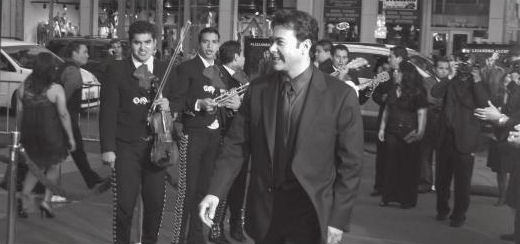
Alejandro Alcondez Cielito Lindo "Beautiful Heaven" film Premiere

Alejandro Alcondez decided that he was ready for Hollywood and founded his American production company, Alejandro Alcondez Pictures, which produces English and Spanish movies for worldwide distribution. He produced his first English-speaking film entitled Cielito Lindo (Beautiful Heaven) in 2007. Alcondez visited many locations and decided to begin film production in Chihuahua, Chihuahua, Mexico. The film premiered at Grauman's Chinese Theatre on May 27, 2010 Alejandro Alcondez not only wrote the script, produced the film, he also directed and starred as a lead actor alongside Adam Rodríguez, Nestor Serrano, Nicole Paggi, Ilia Volok, and Pato Hoffmann, among others.

== Filmography ==
=== Acting career ===
Year	Film	Notes	Production Company
2010	"Cielito Lindo" Beautiful Heaven	Lead Actor	Alejandro Alcondez Pictures
2004	"Los Mas Buscados I"	Lead Actor	Baja Films
2004	"Los Mas Buscados II"	Lead Actor	Baja Films
2004	"Los Mas Buscados III"	Lead Actor	Baja Films
2002	"Sueños Amargos"	Lead Actor	Provizion Films
2000	"La Camioneta Gris II"	Lead Actor	Baja Films
1999	"Por ser Mexicano"	Lead Actor	Baja Films
1998	"El Bronco Negro"	Lead Actor	Producciones Alejandro Alcondez
1997	"El Señor de los Cielos I"	Lead Actor	Baja Films
1997	"El Señor de los Cielos II"	Lead Actor	Baja Films
1997	"El Señor de los Cielos III"	Lead Actor	Baja Films
1997	"AK-47 – Cuerno de Chivo"	Lead Actor	Condor Pictures
1996	"Clave Privada"	Lead Actor	Baja Films
1996	"Clave Nueva"	Lead Actor	Baja Films
1996	"Una Pagina Mas"	Lead Actor	Baja Films
1996	"La Fichera mas Rapida del Oeste II"	Lead Actor	Baja Films – PM Films
1995	"Furia Salvaje"	Lead Actor	Producciones Alejandro Alcondez
1995	"Arturo El Rey de Copas"	Lead Actor	Baja Films
1995	"Crimen en Chihuahua"	Lead Actor	Baja Films
1995	"La Trampa"	Lead Actor	Baja Films
1993	"Impacto de Muerte"	Lead Actor	Producciones Alejandro Alcondez
1991	"El Corrido de los Perez"	Lead Actor	Million Dollar
1990	"Asesino de Media Noche"	Lead Actor	
1990	"La Quebradita Caliente I"	Lead Actor	
1990	"La Quebradita Caliente II"	Lead Actor	

=== As producer ===
Year	Film	Notes	Production Company
2010	"Cielito Lindo" Beautiful Heaven	Executive Producer	Alejandro Alcondez Pictures
1998	"El Bronco Negro"	Executive Producer	Producciones Alejandro Alcondez
1995	"Furia Salvaje"	Executive Producer	Producciones Alejandro Alcondez
1993	"Impacto de Muerte"	Executive Producer	Producciones Alejandro Alcondez

=== As writer ===
Year	Film	Notes	Production Company
2010	"Cielito Lindo" Beautiful Heaven	Story and screenplay	Alejandro Alcondez Pictures
2002	"Sueños Amargos"	Story and screenplay	Provizion Films
1998	"El Bronco Negro"	Story and screenplay	Producciones Alejandro Alcondez
1995	"Furia Salvaje"	Story and screenplay	Producciones Alejandro Alcondez
1993	"Impacto de Muerte"	Story and screenplay	Producciones Alejandro Alcondez

=== As director ===
Year	Film	Notes	Production Company
2010	"Cielito Lindo" Beautiful Heaven	35 mm. Film	Alejandro Alcondez Pictures
2002	"Sueños Amargos"	Filmed in Los Angeles California	Provizion Films
1998	"El bronko negro"	Filmed in Mexico	Producciones Alejandro Alcondez
1995	"Furia salvaje; El corrido de Juan Pastor"	Filmed in Mexico	Producciones Alejandro Alcondez
1993	"Impacto de muerte"	Filmed in Mexico	Producciones Alejandro Alcondez

== Theater ==
During his early career, Alcondez participated in various theater productions as an actor, director, writer and producer, gaining valuable experience in screenwriting and filmmaking

Title	Role	Director
Don Juan Tenorio	Juan Tenorio – Lead Actor	Guillermo Lepe
La Virginidad	Arturo – Lead Actor	Alejandro Alcondez
Martin el Zapatero	Martin – Lead Actor	Alejandro Alcondez
Por la Vida de Jesucristo	Director	Alejandro Alcondez

== Other works ==
Alcondez has been part of many other projects including screen writing, producing and directing many music videos and various feature films like. Cielito Lindo (Beautiful Heaven) filmed at Chihuahua, Mexico. In an interview in a Mexican newspaper, Alcondez explained the reason he chose to film at that location as well the plot of the film and when he wrote the Screenplay for "Cielito Lindo" (Beautiful Heaven). as well as the number of films he has participated.
