= Trans (1998 film) =

- Trans DVD cover
- Directed by: Julian Goldberger
- Written by: Julian Goldberger; Michael Robinson; Martin Garner
- Produced by: Michael A. Robinson; Joe Monteleone; Martin Garner
- Starring: Ryan Daugherty; Edge Edgerton; Jon Daugherty; Stephanie Davis
- Cinematography: Jesse Rosen
- Edited by: Affonso Gonçalves
- Music by: Fat Mama & Her Trans World Orchestra; Jonathan Goldberger
- Production companies: Down Home Productions; Yid Panther
- Distributed by: Cowboy Booking International
- Release dates: September 11, 1998 (TIFF); January 7, 2000 (United States)
- Running time: 80 minutes
- Country: United States
- Language: English

Trans is a 1998 American independent film written and directed by Julian Goldberger. It is based on a story by Goldberger, Michael Robinson and Martin Garner, and stars Ryan Daugherty as Ryan Kazinski. It was filmed in Fort Myers, Florida.

The film is in part inspired by the work of Athens, Georgia-based filmmaker James Herbert, particularly his collaborations with the band R.E.M.

== Plot ==
In a southwestern Florida youth detention center, Ryan Kazinski is having a difficult time with his confinement. Through prisoners' interactions with the guards and Ryan's own experience with the warden, the harsh conditions and level of discipline in the facility are shown.

While Ryan is on trash pickup detail, a fight breaks out between two inmates. In the ensuing confusion, Kazinsky and several inmates escape the prison. The young men run through an orange grove and a swamp, eventually coming to a farmhouse where they enter and steal civilian clothes. The inmates leave the farmhouse and travel down a dirt road to a rural convenience store where Ryan steals an ice cream bar. While he is eating in the restroom, the other two escapees steal a truck and drive away, leaving Ryan behind. Ryan emerges to find them gone and is questioned by some of the locals who take a liking to him and ask him about his plans and whether he intends to keep running. One of the locals gives Ryan a ride into town.

In the city, Ryan spends time listening to a street musician and talking with a parking meter. Ryan then ends up in a supermarket where he inhales nitrous oxide from whipped cream cans and observes and interacts with customers. Upon leaving the supermarket, Ryan steps on the bottle cap of one of two men who are drinking beer on the hood of a car. The men become offended and one proceeds to beat Ryan unconscious. While unconscious, Ryan has a vision of a silhouetted woman against a blue sky.

Ryan is recognized and awakened by three other ex-inmates, with whom he attends a party. He leaves, assuring his friends that he has a place to stay. Ryan visits his brother, who questions him as to why he ran when he only had one month left of his sentence to serve. Ryan cannot answer, and informs his brother of his plan to go to Colorado and seek out his mother. Ryan's brother then reluctantly tells him to leave before he becomes too attached to him again.

Ryan enters a bus station and asks for a one-way ticket to Denver. He discovers that he doesn't have the money for the ticket, and after attempting to bribe the bus station manager, he is thrown out of the station. Ryan then hitches a ride with a lady who takes him to a doughnut shop. While she is inside, he discovers a gun in her purse and steals it before running away.

Ryan is later approached by one of the other escapees who enlists his help in breaking into a veterinary clinic to steal drugs. The two break in, but while the other inmate steals the drugs, Ryan is distracted by the dogs in the kennels, one of which he frees and later places in the window of his brother's room.

Soon after, Ryan is spotted by police. He pulls out his gun, which the police notice, and then runs. The police fire two shots, but it is never made clear if Ryan is hit. The following morning, Ryan is seen observing planes taking off and landing at a small airport. He approaches a man sitting at a table and asks if he could take him up. The man notices the gun in Ryan's hand, and we then see the plane taking off. The film ends with Ryan looking out of the window smiling.

== Cast ==
- Ryan Daugherty as Ryan Kazinski
- Jon Daugherty as Little Brother
- Edge Edgerton as Bus Station Manager
- Stephanie Davis as Boston Cream Girl
- Charles Walker as Inmate/Party Rapper
- Elijah Smith as Inmate/Party Rapper
- Jeremiah Robinson as Inmate/Party Rapper
- Marshall Williams III as Drill Guard
- Julian Goldberger as Man at desk (uncredited)

== Production ==
The rural country store in the film is in actuality The Corkscrew Country Store in Estero, Florida. The animal clinic scenes were filmed at the Miracle Mile Animal Clinic in Fort Myers.

== Release ==
=== Film festivals ===
Trans received screenings at the 1998 Toronto International Film Festival, the 1999 Berlin Film Festival, the 1999 Sundance Film Festival, and the 1999 South By Southwest Film Festival.

=== Distribution ===
Despite praise from critics and recognition at film festivals, Trans had difficulty in securing distribution, and went a year after its 1998 Toronto festival screening without a deal. Robert Horton of Film Comment wrote, "Given the state of the arthouse/indie scene these days, it can't be too surprising that a film like Trans is left by the roadside...yet Trans is exactly the sort of smallish, idiosyncratically personal movie that belongs in the arthouse loop; for various reasons it will never draw the Happy, Texas-size crowd, but it will mesmerize the kind of audience that regularly takes a chance on something at a repertory house with an adventurous calendar."

Of the film's distribution concerns, Brett Sokul of Miami New Times wrote, "Despite the reams of praise, conventional industry wisdom saw Trans as 'difficult,' i.e., not a reliable arthouse ticket-seller. It's an attitude that dramatizes the increasingly commercial pressures on the world of independent film, once a respite from the dictates of the box office but now often just as enslaved to it."

Eventually, Trans secured a distribution deal with Cowboy Booking International and was given a limited theatrical release in the U.S. on January 7, 2000. The film was also aired in the U.S. on both The Independent Film Channel and the Sundance Channel.

=== Home media ===
Trans was first released on DVD by Fox Lorber on November 20, 2001. The DVD features the film, a trailer, the soundtrack, and web links. It was re-released on DVD by Wellspring Media on December 26, 2006.

== Critical response ==
Wesley Morris of the San Francisco Chronicle wrote "Trans itches to be hyper-stylized but settles for occasional flights into coolness". Sam Adams of Philadelphia City Paper opined, "Goldberger’s exceptionally weird debut invokes Jarmusch, Southern Gothic and THX 1138-style sci-fi". Gavin Smith from Film Comment magazine said, "Julian Goldberger's idiosyncratic Trans, which follows the nocturnal wanderings and random encounters of a juvenile detention center escapee amid the strip malls and neighborhoods of Ft. Myers, Florida, may have had a budget a fraction of anything in competition, but it showed ten times the inspiration and cinematic integrity." Lawrence Van Gelder from The New York Times wrote, "Trans remains a sensitive evocation of youthful turmoil". In a favorable review from The Village Voice, critic Amy Taubin wrote: "What's most remarkable about Trans is how faithful it is to Ryan's consciousness and to the way it shifts between fantasy and a mesmerized response to details of the outside world."

The film also caught the attention of producer, Ted Hope, who offered to produce Goldberger's next feature, The Hawk Is Dying.

=== Awards and nominations ===
- 1999, Reader's Jury Prize for Best Film - Berlin International Film Festival
- 2000, Someone to Watch Award at Independent Spirit Awards (nominee)

== Original score and soundtrack ==
The score contains music by Fat Mama and her Trans World Orchestra and Jonathan Goldberger. The film includes the following tracks:

- "Peace" performed by Lonnie Liston Smith and The Cosmic Echoes
- "Peace" performed by Horace Silver Quintet
- "Theme" performed by Cibo Matto
- "In a Blink" performed by The Mondal Family
- "Baby D" performed by The Mondal Family
- "Lions on the Loose" performed by The Mondal Family
- "Pimp Slap" performed by Fat Mama
- "Gifeltiluv" performed by Fat Mama
- "D.U.O" performed by Eulipion Journey Agents
