= Pasadena (TV series) =

American prime time soap opera

- Genre: Soap opera
- Created by: Mike White
- Starring: Dana Delany; Martin Donovan; Balthazar Getty; Alison Lohman; Chris Marquette; Nicole Paggi; Alan Simpson; Mark Valley; Natasha Gregson Wagner
- Composer: Mark Snow
- Country of origin: United States
- Original language: English
- No. of seasons: 1
- No. of episodes: 13

Production
- Production companies: Brad Grey Television; Go Mike Go Productions; Columbia TriStar Television

Original release
- Network: Fox
- Release: September 28 – November 2, 2001

Pasadena is an American primetime soap opera that aired on Fox from September 28 to November 2, 2001. It was created by Mike White and produced by Brad Grey Television, Go Mike Go Productions and Columbia TriStar Television

== Summary ==
The series starred Alison Lohman as Lily McAllister, an initially naïve young woman who witnesses a stranger's suicide, and begins to investigate the secrets being hidden by her own very wealthy California family, the Greeleys. Other cast members included Dana Delany and Martin Donovan as Lily's parents, Will and Catherine McAllister, and Chris Marquette as Lily's brother, Mason. Mark Valley, Balthazar Getty, and Natasha Gregson Wagner portrayed Catherine's siblings Robert, Nate, and Beth Greeley, while Philip Baker Hall and Barbara Babcock played Greeley patriarch and matriarch George and Lillian, respectively, in recurring roles. Alan Simpson was cast as Lily's love interest Henry Bellow, with Derek Cecil as Henry's brother Tom in a recurring role.

== Cast ==
Cast of Pasadena

- Dana Delany as Catherine McAllister, Lily's unstable mother
- Martin Donovan as Will McAllister, Lily's unfaithful father
- Balthazar Getty as Nate Greeley, Lily's drug-addled uncle
- Alison Lohman as Lily McAllister, a high-school girl uncovering her family's secrets
- Christopher Marquette as Mason McAllister, Lily's sexually frustrated brother
- Nicole Paggi as Jennie Bradbury, Lily's bratty best friend
- Alan Simpson as Henry Bellow, a new boy at Lily's school, who is searching for his mother
- Mark Valley as Robert Greeley, Lily's arrogant and violent uncle
- Natasha Gregson Wagner as Beth Greeley, Lily's free-spirited aunt
- Barbara Babcock as Lillian Greeley, Catherine's domineering mother

== Production ==
Pasadena was created by Mike White, who attended elementary and high school in Pasadena, California. Actress/director Diane Keaton directed the pilot episode, and was among the show's executive producers. Other producers included Mark B. Perry, Dana Baratta, R. W. Goodwin, and Bill Robinson. The pilot was edited by Tatiana S. Riegel.

== Episodes ==
No.	Title	Directed by	Written by	Original release date
1	"Pilot"	Diane Keaton	Mike White	September 28, 2001
Young Lily McAllister (Alison Lohman) discovers that her affluent and seemingly perfect California family may be hiding shocking secrets.
2	"The Rat"	R. W. Goodwin	Mike White	October 5, 2001
3	"Henry's Secret"	Ellen S. Pressman	Mike White	October 26, 2001
4	"Hostile Environment"	David Petrarca	Mark B. Perry	November 2, 2001
5	"Puppy Love"	Tim Van Patten	Kim Newton	Unaired
6	"The Body"	Michael Lange	Dana Baratta	Unaired
7	"The Bones"	Mary Harron	Alexandra Cunningham	Unaired
8	"Run Lily Run"	Michael Lehmann	Timothy J. Lea	Unaired
9	"Someone to Talk To"	Bill L. Norton	Hilly Hicks, Jr.	Unaired
10	"A River in Egypt"	Steve Robman	Christy Callahan	Unaired
11	"The Truth Hurts"	Sanford Bookstaver	Mike White	Unaired
12	"A Lie Worth Fighting For"	Roy H. Wagner	Mike White	Unaired
13	"Don't It Always Seem to Go?"	Ellen S. Pressman	Mike White	Unaired

== Release ==
=== Broadcast and syndication ===
Only four episodes were originally aired in the U.S. in 2001, though 13 were filmed, with the last episode seemingly resolving the central mystery of the series. In late 2005, the series was shown in its entirety for the first time in the United States, on the cable channel SoapNet.

In 2003 and 2004, all 13 episodes were aired in various countries, such as Romania (by the public television TVR 1), Bulgaria (BTV Channel), Colombia, Croatia, Mexico, Serbia, Slovakia, New Zealand, Finland, Denmark, Russia, South Africa (on the pay channel M-Net), Israel (on cable Channel 3), and China. It began airing in Belgium on Club RTL on June 27, 2010.

As of May 6, 2026, it is currently streaming on Tubi.

=== Home media ===
Mill Creek Entertainment announced the series on DVD.

== Reception ==
Although the show was critically acclaimed, it was watched by only 4.3 million viewers. The general speculation at the time was that, with the series having premiered two weeks after the September 11, 2001 attacks, American audiences were not willing to watch a show like Pasadena, with its dark atmosphere and cynical storylines.
