= Laurel Canyon (film) =

2002 film by Lisa Cholodenko

- Theatrical release poster
- Directed by: Lisa Cholodenko
- Written by: Lisa Cholodenko
- Produced by: Jeff Levy-Hinte; Susan A. Stover
- Starring: Frances McDormand; Kate Beckinsale; Christian Bale; Natascha McElhone; Alessandro Nivola
- Cinematography: Wally Pfister
- Edited by: Amy E. Duddleston
- Music by: Craig Wedren
- Production company: Antidote Films
- Distributed by: Sony Pictures Classics
- Release dates: May 18, 2002 (Cannes); March 7, 2003
- Running time: 101 minutes
- Country: United States
- Language: English
- Box office: $4.4 million

Laurel Canyon is a 2002 American drama film written and directed by Lisa Cholodenko. The film stars Frances McDormand, Christian Bale, Kate Beckinsale, Natascha McElhone, and Alessandro Nivola.

== Plot ==
Sam and Alex are a newly engaged couple who move to Los Angeles to further their careers. Sam is a recently graduated medical student from Harvard Medical School, starting his residency in psychiatry, while Alex, who graduated top of the class at Harvard with a M.D., is finishing her Harvard Ph.D. dissertation on genomics. The relatively straitlaced, upwardly mobile couple plans to stay at the vacant home of Sam's mother, Jane, a free-spirited record producer in the Laurel Canyon section of Los Angeles.

In a change of plans, however, Jane is still around, recording an album with her British boyfriend, Ian McKnight, and his band.

Jane and Ian are in the midst of a fiery romance, and both the producer and the band seem more interested in partying than finishing the record. Jane's presence is a source of consternation for Sam, as he and his mother have quite different mindsets and a strained relationship.

The new lifestyle options presented by her soon-to-be mother-in-law intrigue the normally hardworking Alex, who begins spending more time with the band and less time on her dissertation. Alex's growing fascination with Jane and Ian leads to a scene where the three of them kiss one another while naked in the swimming pool.

Sam himself feels attracted to an Israeli fellow resident, Sara, who is unapologetically interested in him as well. They share one first kiss while returning from an informal interns' meeting, around the same time Alex has her first tryst with Jane and Ian in the pool. Some time later, while Alex attends Jane and Ian's party held in a crowded hotel suite to celebrate the band's new album release, Sam and Sara meet in a parking lot and, in a conversation filled with sexual tension, they declare their attraction for one another.

The situation strains Sam and Alex's relationship almost to the point of breaking by the end of the film. After the party has finished and the three of them are left alone in the suite, Ian tries to "finish" (in his words) his encounter with Alex and Jane, but the latter decides against it and the threesome does not take place. Upon returning home after his conversation with Sara, Sam decides to go to the hotel and discovers Jane, Ian, and Alex scantily-clad in the bedroom. In a fit of rage, he repeatedly punches Ian, hits his mother with his elbow as she tries to split up the fight, and leaves the hotel, but Alex chases him down the street and professes her love for him.

The next morning, the situation seems back to normal again. But Sara phones Sam and tells him she can't control her heart, as opposed to what he told her the day before. Sam watches his surroundings, postpones any further conversation, and takes a moment of reflection.

== Cast ==
- Frances McDormand as Jane
- Christian Bale as Sam
- Kate Beckinsale as Alex
- Natascha McElhone as Sara
- Alessandro Nivola as Ian McKnight
- Lou Barlow as Frip
- Imaad Wasif as Dean
- Russell Pollard as Rowan
- Mickey Petralia as Mickey
- Melissa De Sousa as Claudia

== Production ==
Cholodenko has said the film was inspired by Joni Mitchell's album Ladies of the Canyon. The script was workshopped at Sundance Institute's lab.

The film focuses in some depth on the challenge of trying to create successful pop music, showing work on two tracks (both actually written, and previously released, by the band Sparklehorse).

== Reception ==
Laurel Canyon has a 69% approval rating on Rotten Tomatoes from 112 reviews, with an average rating of 6.4/10. The site's critical consensus reads, "Though the movie itself is flawed, McDormand is fantastic as Jane." On Metacritic, it has a weighted average score of 61 out of 100, based on 36 critics, indicating "generally favorable" reviews.

Roger Ebert of The Chicago Sun-Times awarded the film two stars out of a possible four.

"Laurel Canyon" is not a successful movie—it's too stilted and pre-programmed to come alive—but in the center of it McDormand occupies a place for her character and makes that place into a brilliant movie of its own. There is nothing wrong with who she is and what she does, although all around her actors are cracking up in strangely written roles.

The relationship between Alex Leam and Jane earned the film a ranking of #133 on Autostraddle's list of the 200 Best Lesbian Films of All Time.

== See also ==
- Laurel Canyon
- Counterculture of the 1960s
