= The Dungeon Masters =

- Directed by: Keven McAlester
- Produced by: Brian Gerber; Jeffrey Kusama-Hinte; Kel Symons
- Cinematography: Lee Daniel
- Edited by: Christine Khalafian; Victor Livingston
- Music by: Blonde Redhead
- Release date: 2008
- Running time: 87 minutes
- Country: United States
- Language: English

The Dungeon Masters is a 2008 documentary film about the role playing game Dungeons & Dragons and its significance in the lives of three dungeon masters (self described as "gamemasters"): Scott Corum, Richard Meeks and Elizabeth Reesman. The film is director Keven McAlester's second feature documentary after You're Gonna Miss Me, and premiered at the 2008 Toronto International Film Festival. It was an official selection of the South by Southwest Film Festival and the AFI Dallas Film Festival. The original film score is by Blonde Redhead. Cinematography is by Lee Daniel. The film's executive producers are Phil Hay and Matt Manfredi, the directors of Bug. The film's producers are Jeff Levy-Hinte, Brian Gerber and Kel Symons.

== Synopsis ==
The Dungeon Masters explores the lives of three devoted Dungeons & Dragons enthusiasts who find the harsh realities of life impeding on their rich worlds of fantasy. This commentary on the frail psyche of the American middle-class examines the subculture of gamers and role-playing games, specifically Dungeons & Dragons.

== Development ==
The movie was originally envisioned as a history of Dungeons & Dragons, but shifted its focus to the lives of the players early on. The film was produced by Antidote Films.

== Release ==
It was released on DVD in 2010 by MPI Media Group.

== Reception ==
Rob Vaux of mania.com comments: "Even when their wounds come self-inflicted or the movie settles for surface impressions rather than more nuanced details, we remain firmly in the trio's corner. We pull madly for them to succeed and die a little bit when life hands them its inevitable failures. McAlister structures the documentary after classic fantasy novels, with rising challenges leading to moments of darkness and an eventual (if comparatively minor) triumph. It demonstrates how the game they love teaches lessons on life, and how life in turn feeds back into the game. They're not in opposition to each other, but act together: something few outsiders understand but which The Dungeon Masters—despite some shortcomings–illustrates with thoughtfulness and empathy."

On Rotten Tomatoes the film has an approval rating of 67% based on reviews from 6 critics.
