= The Kids Are All Right (film) =

2010 film by Lisa Cholodenko

- Theatrical release poster
- Directed by: Lisa Cholodenko
- Written by: Lisa Cholodenko; Stuart Blumberg
- Produced by: Gary Gilbert; Jeffrey Levy-Hinte; Celine Rattray; Jordan Horowitz
- Starring: Annette Bening; Julianne Moore; Mark Ruffalo; Mia Wasikowska; Josh Hutcherson
- Cinematography: Igor Jadue-Lillo
- Edited by: Jeffrey M. Werner
- Music by: Carter Burwell
- Production companies: Gilbert Films; Mandalay Vision; Antidote Films
- Distributed by: Focus Features (Select territories); Inferno Distribution (International)
- Release dates: January 25, 2010 (Sundance Film Festival); July 9, 2010 (United States)
- Running time: 107 minutes
- Country: United States
- Language: English
- Budget: $4 million
- Box office: $34.7 million

The Kids Are All Right is a 2010 American comedy drama film directed by Lisa Cholodenko and written by Cholodenko and Stuart Blumberg. It is among the first mainstream movies to show a same-sex couple raising two teenagers. A hit at the 2010 Sundance Film Festival, it opened in limited release on July 9, 2010, expanded to more theaters on July 30, 2010, and was released on DVD and Blu-ray on November 16, 2010.

The film won the Golden Globe Award for Best Motion Picture – Musical or Comedy and Annette Bening was awarded the Golden Globe Award for Best Actress – Musical or Comedy. The film also received 4 Academy Award nominations, including Best Picture, at the 83rd Academy Awards.

== Plot ==
Nicole "Nic" and Jules Allgood are a married lesbian couple living in the Los Angeles area. Nic is an obstetrician and Jules is a housewife who is starting a landscape design business. Each has given birth to a child using the same sperm donor.

Nic and Jules' 15-year-old son Laser wants to find his biological father, but as he is too young to request that information from the sperm bank, he enlists his 18-year-old sister Joni to contact them. The sperm bank identifies Paul Hatfield, a restaurant owner, as the donor and shares his contact information.

When the three meet, the kids are impressed by Paul's bohemian lifestyle, and Paul becomes enthusiastic about being in their lives. Joni and Laser avoid telling their mothers, fearful of upsetting them. Yet, Jules and Nic find out and invite Paul over to dinner. When Jules mentions her landscape business, Paul asks her to transform his back garden. Jules agrees, although Nic is apprehensive.

As Jules begins the job, she finds that Paul is appreciative of her talent, something she feels she is lacking from Nic. After Jules impulsively kisses Paul one afternoon, they end up in bed together and start an affair. Jules and the kids start spending more time with Paul, much to Nic's chagrin as she feels that Paul undermines her authority over the children. After a heated argument with Jules, Nic suggests they all have dinner at Paul's house to ease the tension. The dinner goes well until Nic discovers traces of Jules's hair in Paul's bathroom and bedroom.

When confronted by Nic later that night, Jules assures Nic that she is not in love with Paul and has not turned straight; she just wanted to be appreciated. Joni and Laser overhear the argument, causing the household to become tense. Paul, believing he has fallen in love with Jules, calls her to suggest that she leave Nic and come live with him, bringing the kids. Jules declines, disgusted with Paul's lack of understanding about her sexuality.

The night before Joni leaves for college, Paul arrives at the Allgoods' house. He is rejected by Joni and angrily confronted by Nic. Laser ignores him as he tries to get his attention through the window. Later that night, Jules tearfully begs her family's forgiveness.

The next morning, the family drives Joni to college. While Nic and Jules hug Joni goodbye, they also affectionately touch each other. During the ride home, Laser tells his mothers that they should not break up because they are too old. Jules and Nic laugh, and the film ends with them smiling at each other and holding hands.

== Cast ==
- Annette Bening as Dr. Nicole 'Nic' Allgood, an OB/GYN specialist and the principal breadwinner of the family. She is Joni and Laser's mother and Jules's wife. She is the biological mother of Joni. Nic feels threatened when the children decide to bring Paul into their lives and worries he will disrupt the family dynamic. She is an alcoholic, but she eventually gives up alcohol.
- Julianne Moore as Jules Allgood, the main homemaker who never had a formal career, but is starting a landscape design business. She is Joni and Laser's mother and Nic's wife. She is the biological mother of Laser.
- Mark Ruffalo as Paul Hatfield, the free-spirited owner of an organic foods restaurant. He was the anonymous sperm donor for both children.
- Mia Wasikowska as Joni Allgood, who has recently turned 18 and is set to leave for college. She is Laser's older sister and was named after Joni Mitchell, Nic's favorite female singer.
- Josh Hutcherson as Laser Allgood, the 15-year-old son who asks Joni to help him meet their biological father.
- Yaya DaCosta as Tanya, an employee and occasional lover of Paul.
- Eddie Hassell as Clay, a friend of Laser who Nic and Jules think is unstable.
- Zosia Mamet as Sasha, a close friend of Joni.
- Kunal Sharma as Jai, a close friend and love interest of Joni.
- James Macdonald as Clay's Dad

== Production ==
Lisa Cholodenko and Stuart Blumberg began outlining the script in late 2004, based in part on some aspects of her life. The project was helped to get off the ground by the caliber of actors who agreed to join, first Julianne Moore, followed by Mark Ruffalo and Annette Bening. Cholodenko stated "People really admired what Stuart [Blumberg] and I got on the page but there was a fear factor regarding how the film was going to make money, as the subject matter is tricky." The film nearly got the green-light in 2006, but Cholodenko postponed the project after she became pregnant by way of an anonymous sperm donor. After giving birth, she resumed work on the film and won financing from three major investors, including the French distributor UGC.

Principal photography was completed in 23 days in Los Angeles in July 2009. The film was made for approximately $4 million. The filmmakers rushed to finish the post-production in time for the Sundance Film Festival, where it was admitted after the deadline for competitive entries. On January 25, 2010 the film had its premiere, becoming one of the festival's breakout hits. A few days later, Focus Features acquired distribution rights to the film in the United States, United Kingdom, Germany and South Africa for $4.8 million. At the 60th Berlinale the film won a Teddy Award. The film closed the 2010 Sydney Film Festival and opened the Los Angeles Film Festival.

== Reception ==
=== Box office ===
Opening in limited release at seven theaters, The Kids Are All Right grossed $491,971 in its first weekend. At $70,282 per theater, the film scored the highest average gross in 2010 as of mid-July 2010. It expanded to 38 theaters on July 16, then 201 on July 23, and finally 847 on July 30. As of December 20, 2010, the film grossed a total of $34,758,951 worldwide.

=== Critical response ===
The film was released to wide acclaim from critics, with Bening receiving widespread praise for her performance. Rotten Tomatoes reports that 93% of critics have given the film a positive review based on 224 reviews, with an average rating of 7.80/10. The site's consensus is that "Worthwhile as both a well-acted ensemble piece and as a smart, warm statement on family values, The Kids Are All Right is remarkable." Metacritic, which assigns a weighted average score out of 1–100 reviews from film critics, has a rating score of 86 based on 39 reviews, with the film in the "universal acclaim" category. Roger Ebert gave the film 3½ stars out of 4 and wrote, "The Kids Are All Right centers on a lesbian marriage, but is not about one. It's a film about marriage itself, an institution with challenges that are universal. Just imagine: You're expected to live much, if not all, of your married life with another adult. We're not raised for this." The film appeared on 39 critics' top ten movie lists for the year 2010. Anthony Quinn of The Independent and Elizabeth Weitzman of the Daily News both listed it as the best film of the year, and four other critics picked it as the second best movie of the year.

=== Accolades ===
Annette Bening won the Golden Globe Award for Best Actress in a Motion Picture – Musical or Comedy, and the film won the Golden Globe Award for Best Motion Picture – Musical or Comedy. Nominations were also given to Julianne Moore for Best Actress and Lisa Cholodenko and Stuart Blumberg for Best Screenplay. Moore and Bening were both nominated for the BAFTA Award for Best Actress in a Leading Role, and Mark Ruffalo was nominated for the BAFTA Award for Best Actor in a Supporting Role. Cholodenko and Blumberg were also nominees for Best Original Screenplay. The film was nominated for Best Picture at the 83rd Academy Awards. Bening and Ruffalo were nominated for Best Actress and Best Supporting Actor respectively. Cholodenko and Blumberg were also nominated for Best Original Screenplay. Laura Rosenthal and Liz Dean won the Artios Award for Outstanding Achievement in Casting – Feature – Studio or Independent Comedy, given by the Casting Society of America. The screenplay was ranked the 21st best American screenplay of the 21st century in IndieWire, with Jude Dry praising the script as "a witty and artful take on contemporary family life. Bitingly clever and unafraid to take unexpected turns."

=== Top ten lists ===
The Kids Are All Right was listed on many critics' top 10 lists.

- 1st – Michael Phillips, Chicago Tribune
- 1st – Elizabeth Weitzman, New York Daily News
- 1st – Rafer Guzmán, Newsday
- 2nd – Lisa Schwarzbaum and Owen Gleiberman, Entertainment Weekly
- 2nd – Joe Neumaier, New York Daily News
- 2nd – Anne Thompson and Caryn James, Indiewire
- 3rd – Ty Burr, Boston Globe
- 3rd – Lisa Kennedy, Denver Post
- 4th – Richard Roeper, Chicago Sun-Times
- 4th – David Ansen, Newsweek
- 4th – Betsy Sharkey, Los Angeles Times
- 5th – Peter Travers, Rolling Stone
- 5th – A.O. Scott, The New York Times
- 6th – Gregory Ellwood, HitFix
- 7th – Joshua Rothkopf, Time Out New York
- 7th – Philip French, The Observer
- 8th – Ann Hornaday, Washington Post
- 8th – Stephen Holden, The New York Times
- 8th – Kirk Honeycutt, The Hollywood Reporter
- 9th – Roger Ebert, Chicago Sun-Times
- 9th – Todd McCarthy, The Hollywood Reporter
- 9th – Mick LaSalle, San Francisco Chronicle
- 10th – Peter Knegt, Indiewire
- 10th – Andrew O'Hehir, Salon.com
- Top 10 (listed alphabetically, not ranked) – Joe Morgenstern, The Wall Street Journal
- Top 10 (listed alphabetically, not ranked) – Carrie Rickey and Steven Rea, Philadelphia Inquirer
- Top 10 (listed alphabetically, not ranked) – Dana Stevens, Slate

== See also ==
- List of LGBT films directed by women
