= Very Good Girls =

- Official movie poster
- Directed by: Naomi Foner
- Written by: Naomi Foner
- Produced by: Norton Herrick; Michael London; Mary Jane Skalski; Janice Williams
- Starring: Dakota Fanning; Elizabeth Olsen; Boyd Holbrook; Ellen Barkin; Clark Gregg; Peter Sarsgaard; Richard Dreyfuss; Demi Moore
- Cinematography: Bobby Bukowski
- Edited by: Andrew Hafitz; Devin Maurer
- Music by: Jenny Lewis
- Production companies: Groundswell Productions; Herrick Entertainment
- Distributed by: Tribeca Film
- Release dates: January 22, 2013 (Sundance Film Festival); June 24, 2014
- Running time: 91 minutes
- Country: United States
- Language: English
- Box office: $6,940

Very Good Girls is a 2013 American drama film and the first feature film directed by American screenwriter Naomi Foner, whose script for drama Running on Empty was Oscar-nominated. First screened publicly in early 2013, the film stars Dakota Fanning and Elizabeth Olsen as two friends who fall for the same man (Boyd Holbrook). The film premiered at the Sundance Film Festival on January 22, 2013; it was given a release on home formats on June 24, 2014.

The supporting cast includes Demi Moore, Richard Dreyfuss, Ellen Barkin, Clark Gregg, and Peter Sarsgaard. The film was produced by Norton Herrick, Michael London, and Mary Jane Skalski.

== Plot ==
Best friends Lilly and Gerri spend their last summer in New York together. At Brighton Beach, they muse about swimming nude before Gerri suddenly takes off her shirt and runs into the water, followed by Lilly. On their way back home, they meet David, a guy selling ice cream. After an awkward conversation, David takes a picture of Lilly from the back.

Arriving home, Lilly sees her father with a woman in the office. She takes comfort in spending the evening with Gerri's family, who are loud and open in contrast to Lilly's stony mother and absent father. The girls talk and vow to lose their virginity before leaving for college.

As Lilly walks to work as a boat tour guide in Manhattan, David watches from a distance. He shows interest in her which she doesn't tell Gerri about, while Gerri exhibits an affection for him despite the lack of reciprocation, and despite neither girl knowing him well. David asks Lilly out, and she agrees.

Lilly's mother learns about her father's affair and asks him to leave, against Lilly's wishes. She begins to hang out with David and they kiss. Gerri invites David to an open mic night where she sings a song she wrote for him, while out of her sight, David takes Lilly's hand and holds it under the table.

Lilly's boss flirts with her, offering lucrative night shifts with an obvious implication. Walking home, she sees David waiting outside her house; they kiss and have sex in the garage. The next morning Lilly bumps into her father who apologizes, asking her to have dinner with him, which she declines. Afterward, David sneaks in through the bathroom window. They shower together before spending the day flocking around the city. They arrive at a basketball court where a stylishly dressed man strips to his underwear and dances ballet liberatingly. Kids join him while David videos.

Later in the evening, Lilly learns that Gerri's father died after collapsing in the subway. She leaves David to be with a despairing Gerri. Sharing her grief encourages Lilly to ask her mother to forgive her father. Gerri tells Lilly she can't stop thinking about David. Guiltily, Lilly rejects David's attempts to meet again. He confronts her and she rebuffs him, asking him to meet up with Gerri, but is dismayed when David complies. He comforts Gerri and they kiss in her backyard garden, which Lilly sees.

At her father's memorial service, Gerri tells Lilly she lost her virginity to David, prompting her to see her boss and agree to his advances. They kiss in the tour boat, but then she changes her mind. However, when she confronts David about having sex with Gerri and he does not respond, she lies and tells him she had sex with her boss. The next day, Lilly surprisingly finds her parents cooking in the kitchen as her mother has forgiven her father. David shows up, claiming he didn't sleep with Gerri, and Lilly storms off.

Gerri tells Lilly that David is leaving for Paris, so Lilly finds him, admitting she didn't sleep with her boss. Angry, David warns her not to manipulate other people's feelings but still kisses her goodbye before leaving in a cab. As Lilly walks away, Gerri confronts her furiously, having witnessed the kiss by chance.

Lilly makes amends with her father and he suggests she ask for forgiveness, but she does not take his advice. The morning before leaving for college, Gerri comes over with a photograph David sent her for Lilly, his way of making sure the girls saw each other before she left. Gerri reveals she never actually had sex with David, she asked him to but he told her he was already in love with someone else. The girls make up, taking off their clothes to dance in the sprinklers.

== Cast ==
The film deals with female sexuality and friendship in a way we haven't seen before. These girls will be stunning young women in a couple of years, but they've struggled through high school with only each other. Most of us have been there. This is the summer where they finally get to touch real life.

— Naomi Foner
- Dakota Fanning as Lilly Berger
- Elizabeth Olsen as Gerri Fields
- Boyd Holbrook as David Avery
- Demi Moore as Kate Fields, Gerri's Mother
- Richard Dreyfuss as Danny Fields, Gerri's Father
- Ellen Barkin as Norma Berger, Lilly's Mother
- Clark Gregg as Edward Berger, Lilly's Father
- Kiernan Shipka as Eleanor Berger, Lilly's Sister
- Clare Foley as Phoebe Berger, Lilly's Other Sister
- Peter Sarsgaard as Fitzsimmons, Lilly's Summertime Job Boss
- Owen Campbell as Karl

== Production ==
Production company Herrick Entertainment announced on July 20, 2012, that principal photography had begun in New York City. Herrick was producing and financing the project, with Michael London's Groundswell Productions also producing.

Shooting locations included Ditmas Park, Brooklyn.

Cast-member Peter Sarsgaard is the son-in-law of writer-director Naomi Foner, who is the mother of his wife, Maggie Gyllenhaal.

In January 2012, Anton Yelchin was in final negotiations to play a role in the film, but he dropped out due to scheduling conflicts and was replaced with Boyd Holbrook.

== Release ==
The film was released on June 6, 2014 through iTunes, Amazon Video, Vudu, and VOD. The film started a limited theatrical release in the United States on July 25, 2014.

== Reception ==
The film received negative reviews from critics. On the review aggregator website Rotten Tomatoes, 20% of 35 critics' reviews are positive, with an average rating of 4.3/10. The website's consensus reads: "Resting on a love triangle played out by poorly drawn characters, Very Good Girls succeeds mainly in making viewers want a better project for Dakota Fanning and Elizabeth Olsen." Metacritic, which uses a weighted average, assigned the film a score of 35 out of 100, based on 11 critics, indicating "generally unfavorable" reviews. David Rooney of The Hollywood Reporter described the film as "a limp directing debut" for Foner, claiming the film's outdated "counter-culture" sensibilities made it appear "frozen in time". Rooney also found the characters unconvincing and criticized the "artificiality" of the love interest who asks the lead character to "read a couple of lines of Sylvia Plath before their first kiss". Variety criticized the "vapid and clichéd" screenplay, while Susan Wloszczyna of RogerEbert.com compared the film negatively to 1980's Little Darlings, which shares a plot element with Very Good Girls.

Bilge Ebiri of Vulture did not find the film's love triangle to be plausible, but stated, "In these and other works, [Naomi] Foner displayed a real feel for the various undercurrents that rage within families, both happy and broken ones. She understands how irritation can transform into profound need at a moment's notice, as well as how happiness can quickly turn rotten. Very Good Girls is full of memorable, subtle touches that come through whenever Foner seems to be working to her strengths." He concluded that "what's actually happening onscreen often feels a lot less interesting than what's clearly boiling beneath the film's surface."
