= High Art =

1998 film by Lisa Cholodenko

- Promotional poster
- Directed by: Lisa Cholodenko
- Written by: Lisa Cholodenko
- Produced by: Jeff Levy-Hinte; Susan A. Stover; Dolly Hall
- Starring: Ally Sheedy; Radha Mitchell; Gabriel Mann; Patricia Clarkson; Bill Sage; Anh Duong; David Thornton; Tammy Grimes
- Cinematography: Tami Reiker
- Edited by: Amy E. Duddleston
- Music by: Shudder to Think
- Production companies: 391 Productions; Antidote Films
- Distributed by: October Films (United States); Odeon Films (Canada)
- Release dates: January 21, 1998 (Sundance); June 12, 1998 (United States)
- Running time: 101 minutes
- Countries: United States; Canada
- Language: English
- Box office: $2 million

High Art is a 1998 independent romantic drama written and directed by Lisa Cholodenko, and starring Ally Sheedy and Radha Mitchell. It premiered at the 1998 Sundance Film Festival, where it won the Waldo Salt Screenwriting Award, and saw a limited release in the United States on June 12, 1998.

The film received positive reviews from critics, with particular praise for Sheedy's performance, which earned several accolades, including the Independent Spirit Award for Best Female Lead, the Los Angeles Film Critics Association Award for Best Actress and the National Society of Film Critics Award for Best Actress.

== Synopsis ==
Sydney (or simply "Syd"), age 24, is a woman who has her whole life mapped out in front of her. Living with longtime boyfriend James, and working her way up at the respected high-art photography magazine Frame, Syd has desires and frustrations that seem typical and manageable. But when a crack in her ceiling springs a leak and Syd finds herself knocking on the door of her upstairs neighbor, a chance meeting suddenly takes her on a new path.

Syd meets Lucy Berliner, a renowned photographer who is now retired. Now 40, Lucy lives with her once glamorous, heroin-addicted German girlfriend Greta, and plays host to a collection of hard-living party kids. Syd is fascinated by Lucy and becomes drawn into the center of Lucy's strangely alluring life upstairs.

Syd mentions Lucy to her bosses (without realising that she is famous) but they remain uninterested until they realise exactly who Lucy is. At a lunch, Lucy agrees to work for the magazine as long as Syd is her editor. Soon a working relationship develops between the two and a project is underway which promises a second chance for Lucy's career. But as Syd and Lucy's collaboration draws them closer together, their working relationship turns sexual and the lines between love and professionalism suddenly blur. As Syd slowly discovers the darker truths of Lucy's life on the edge, she is forced to confront her own hunger for recognition and the uncertain rewards of public esteem.

== Cast ==
- Ally Sheedy as Lucy Berliner
- Radha Mitchell as Syd, an assistant editor at Frame
- Gabriel Mann as James, Syd's live-in boyfriend
- Charis Michelsen as Debby
- David Thornton as Harry, an editor at Frame and Syd's boss
- Anh Duong as Dominique, chief editor of Frame
- Patricia Clarkson as Greta, a German actress and Lucy's live-in girlfriend
- Helen Mendes as White Hawk
- Bill Sage as Arnie
- Tammy Grimes as Vera, Lucy's mother
- Cindra Feuer as Delia
- Anthony Ruivivar as Xanderr
- Elaine Tse as Zoe
- Rudolf Martin as Dieter
- Laura Ekstrand as Waitress
- Sarita Choudhury as Joan

== Production notes ==
The photography by Lucy Berliner (Sheedy) was based on Nan Goldin's work. The photographs were made by Jojo Whilden.

== Reception ==
=== Release ===
The film premiered at the 1998 Sundance Film Festival to rave reviews. A 4K restoration was released in April 2025.

=== Critical response ===
On Rotten Tomatoes, the film holds an approval rating of 78%, based on 51 reviews, and an average rating of 6.8/10. The site's critics consensus reads, "A surprisingly sultry performance from Ally Sheedy elevates High Art from pretentious melodrama to compelling—if still a little pretentious—romance." On Metacritic, High Art has a score of 73 based on 17 reviews, indicating "generally favorable" reviews.

Film critic Roger Ebert praised the film as "masterful", noting "High Art is so perceptive and mature it makes similar films seem flippant. The performances are on just the right note, scene after scene, for what needs to be done."

Emanuel Levy of Variety wrote, "The beauty of Cholodenko’s writing is that she etches the evolving friendship, and the transformation of the two women, step by step, without any cheating," and that she "painstakingly dissects the culture of heroin chic and its implications." Of Sheedy, Levy wrote after years of "’80s teen-angst movies, [she] shakes up her old screen image entirely and emerges as a mature, highly disciplined actress." Levy noted "Clarkson excels in portraying an aging, disenchanted actress, desperately clinging to Lucy – and to drugs", and singled out Mitchell as the film's "real revelation", saying "her scenes with Sheedy are so truthfully touching."

Janet Maslin of The New York Times praised the performances, but said the ending is one of "contrived inevitability."

IndieWire listed it as #7 of The 15 Greatest Lesbian Movies of All Time. In 2022, Autostraddle listed it as #58 of The 200 Best Lesbian Movies of All Time.

== Awards and nominations ==
Award	Category	Nominee(s)	Result	Ref.
Boston Society of Film Critics Awards	Best Supporting Actress	Patricia Clarkson	Nominated	
Boston Society of Film Critics Awards	Best Actress	Ally Sheedy	Nominated	
Cannes Film Festival	Golden Camera	Lisa Cholodenko	Nominated	
Chicago Film Critics Association Awards	Best Actress	Ally Sheedy	Nominated	
Chlotrudis Awards	Best Movie		Nominated	
Chlotrudis Awards	Best Actress	Ally Sheedy	Nominated	
Chlotrudis Awards	Best Supporting Actress	Patricia Clarkson	Nominated	
Chlotrudis Awards	Best Director	Lisa Cholodenko	Nominated	
Deauville Film Festival	Jury Special Prize	Lisa Cholodenko	Won	
Deauville Film Festival	Grand Special Prize	Lisa Cholodenko	Nominated	
14th Independent Spirit Awards	Best Female Lead	Ally Sheedy	Won	
14th Independent Spirit Awards	Producers Award	Susan A. Stover	Won	
14th Independent Spirit Awards	Best First Feature	Lisa Cholodenko, Dolly Hall, Jeffrey Kusama-Hinte, Susan A. Stover	Nominated	
14th Independent Spirit Awards	Best Cinematography	Tami Reiker	Nominated	
14th Independent Spirit Awards	Best Supporting Female	Patricia Clarkson	Nominated	
14th Independent Spirit Awards	Best First Screenplay	Lisa Cholodenko	Nominated	
GLAAD Media Awards	Outstanding Film (Limited Release)		Won	
Gotham Independent Film Awards	Breakthrough Director	Lisa Cholodenko	Nominated	
Los Angeles Film Critics Association Awards	Best Actress	Ally Sheedy	Won	
National Society of Film Critics Awards	Best Actress	Ally Sheedy	Won	
National Society of Film Critics Awards	Best Supporting Actress	Patricia Clarkson	Nominated	
Stockholm Film Festival	Bronze Horse	Lisa Cholodenko	Nominated	
Sundance Film Festival	Waldo Salt Screenwriting Award	Lisa Cholodenko	Won	
Sundance Film Festival	Grand Jury Prize – Dramatic	Lisa Cholodenko	Nominated	
Valladolid International Film Festival	Golden Spike	Lisa Cholodenko	Nominated	

== See also ==
- List of LGBT films directed by women
