= Nicole Paggi =

American actress

- Occupation: Actress
- Years active: 2001–present
- Notable work: Pasadena; Hope & Faith; One on One

Nicole Paggi is an American actress. She is best known her role of Jennie Bradbury in the critically acclaimed FOX television series Pasadena, which was directed by Diane Keaton and created by Mike White. She also had additional series regular roles, such as the first Sydney Shanowski on the television sitcom Hope & Faith alongside Kelly Ripa and Faith Ford, and as Sara Crawford in One on One.

== Career ==
Paggi made her television debut in 2001 when she received the series regular role of Jennie Bradbury in the FOX television critically acclaimed drama Pasadena. Following her role on Pasadena, she played the recurring role of Britney in the Emmy Award winning NBC series Providence. Paggi continued to appear in guest roles on television series such as Glory Days, Fastlane, Judging Amy, CSI: Miami and the CBS pilot Expert Witness. In 2003, Paggi appeared in the television film Frozen Impact, playing the daughter of Ted McGinley's character, who would later play his daughter in the television series Hope & Faith.

In 2003, Paggi received the role of Sydney Shanowski on the ABC sitcom Hope & Faith, alongside Faith Ford and Kelly Ripa. She appeared throughout the series' first season, before being replaced by Megan Fox for its second and third seasons. Paggi received another television series regular role, as Sara Crawford in the UPN television sitcom One on One, during the show's fifth and final season. Her other television credits include guest appearances in Quintuplets, Jake in Progress, CSI: Crime Scene Investigation, for which she appeared in 2002 and again in 2008, Mad Love and 90210, as well as the television films Campus Confidential and Undercover Bridesmaid. In 2007, Paggi played a leading role in the feature film Cielito Lindo, opposite Alejandro Alcondez, who also directed, produced and wrote the film.

In 2011, she starred in Girls Talk, a play written by Roger Kumble, alongside Brooke Shields and Constance Zimmer, and was nominated for an Ovation Award.

She most recently played the role of Maxie Jones on General Hospital.

She has appeared in guest roles such as 9-1-1 on FOX, The Rookie: Feds (2022), and The Sterling Affairs on FX (2023), playing Kristen Rivers (Doc Rivers' wife).

== Filmography ==
Year	Title	Role	Notes
2001–2002	Pasadena	Jennie Bradbury	Season 1 - 13 episodes Uncredited role
2002	Glory Days	Maddie Mills	"Everybody Loves Rudy" (season 1, episode 6)
2002	CSI: Crime Scene Investigation	Nicole Exmoor	"Let the Seller Beware" (season 3, episode 3)
2002	Providence	Britney	"Gotcha" (season 4, episode 18) "Smoke and Mirrors" (season 4, episode 21) "Out of Control" (season 4, episode 22) "A New Beginning" (season 5, episode 1) "Cloak & Dagger" (season 5, episode 3) "The Sound of Music" (season 5, episode 9)
2003	Expert Witness	Stephanie	Television Film
2003	Fastlane	Zoe	"Dogtown" (seasob 1, episode 10)
2003	Frozen Impact	Marie Blanchard	TV film
2003	Judging Amy	Ms. Griffin	"Going Down" (season 5, episode 2)
2003–2004	Hope & Faith	Sydney Shanowski	Season 1
2004	CSI: Miami	Laura Spelman	"MIA/NYC NonStop" (season 2, episode 23)
2004	Quintuplets	Julie	"Shall We Fight" (season 1, episode 20)
2005	Jake in Progress	Skylar Simms	"Loose Thread" (season 1, episode 6)
2005	Campus Confidential	Melinda	TV film
2005–2006	One on One	Sara Crawford	Season 5 - 22 episodes
2007	Cielito Lindo	Nicole	Mexican song
2008	CSI: Crime Scene Investigation	Sylvie Thornton	"Let It Bleed" (season 9, episode 4)
2011	Mad Love	Waitress	"Pub Quiz" (season 1, episode 9)
2012	Undercover Bridesmaid	Daisy	TV film
2012	90210	Carrie Anne Monroe	"Into the Wild" (season 5, episode 4) "The Con" (season 5, episode 6)
2014	Rizzoli & Isles	Sydney Allen	"Lost & Found" (season 5, episode 8)
2015	How Not to Propose	Hannah	TV film
2021	9-1-1	Lizzie Hill	"Ghost Stories" (season 5, episode 7)
2023-25	General Hospital	Maxie Jones	Temporarily filling in for Kirsten Storms

== Awards and nominations ==
Ovation Awards

- 2011: Nominated for Featured Actress in a Play for the role of Scarlett in "Girls Talk"
