= Thanks for Sharing =

- Theatrical release poster
- Directed by: Stuart Blumberg
- Written by: Stuart Blumberg; Matt Winston
- Produced by: William Migliore; David Koplan; Leslie Urdang; Dean Vanech; Miranda de Pencier
- Starring: Mark Ruffalo; Tim Robbins; Gwyneth Paltrow; Josh Gad; Joely Richardson; Patrick Fugit; Carol Kane; Alecia Moore
- Cinematography: Yaron Orbach
- Edited by: Anne McCabe
- Music by: Christopher Lennertz
- Production companies: Olympus Pictures; Class 5 Films
- Distributed by: Lionsgate; Roadside Attractions
- Release dates: September 6, 2012 (TIFF); September 20, 2013 (United States)
- Running time: 112 minutes
- Country: United States
- Language: English
- Box office: $3.5 million

Thanks for Sharing is a 2012 American comedy-drama film directed by Stuart Blumberg, who co-wrote the screenplay with Matt Winston. The film stars Mark Ruffalo, Tim Robbins, Gwyneth Paltrow, Josh Gad, Joely Richardson, Patrick Fugit, Carol Kane, and Alecia Moore, with a supporting cast including Michaela Watkins, Emily Meade, and Isiah Whitlock Jr.

The film premiered at the 2012 Toronto International Film Festival to mixed reviews, and was released in the United States a year later.

== Plot ==
In New York City, Adam is recovering from his sexual addiction. He has been abstinent for five years. Neil is a doctor who was court ordered to attend sex addiction meetings after being convicted of rubbing against people in public. He grinds against a stranger on the subway and gets punched for it on the way to a sex addiction meeting. Mike is a married recovering sex addict and group leader. He sponsors Adam, who in turn, sponsors Neil.

At work, Neil makes inappropriate jokes and gets in trouble. Adam asked Neil to do journaling work, but Neil watched porn instead. After finding out, Adam threatens to stop sponsoring Neil if he will not do the work.

Adam meets Phoebe at a party, and they go on a date. Phoebe's ex is an alcoholic, and she refuses to date another addict, so Adam does not mention his own addiction.

At work, Neil tries to excuse his behavior the previous day to his boss, but is later caught secretly filming up her skirt. After being fired, he admits to the group that he is out of control and intends to take his meetings seriously. Adam agrees to sponsor him again, but demands that he is not allowed to take the subway, and must attend ninety meetings in ninety days.

Meanwhile, Mike's son Danny, a recovering drug addict, returns home and attempts to make amends to his parents. Danny says that he has been clean and sober for the past eight months.

Phoebe discovers a sobriety medal after sleeping with Adam and confronts him about it. Adam admits his sex addiction.

Dede, a member of the meetings, calls Neil. She wants to have sex with her abusive ex, but cannot get a hold of her sponsor. Neil talks her out of having sex with her ex and runs to her location to give her support. She lends Neil her bike, and he embraces the biking lifestyle. Later, the two go dancing. They almost kiss, but do not.

Phoebe and Adam are having dinner when they are approached by Becky, one of his casual flings. Phoebe later catches Adam on the phone. He says that it is someone he sponsors. Phoebe does not believe him and asks to see his phone. At first Adam refuses, but then relents. He was telling the truth. Adam brings up Phoebe's trust issues, and the two argue, with her leaving.

Mike and Danny get into a fight when Mike assumes that he stole his mother's pills. Danny mentions Mike gave Katie hepatitis C, and confronts him about hitting him as a child. Mike slaps him, he fights back knocking Katie over; realizing what he has done, Danny flees.

The next day, Adam goes on a work trip to DC. There, he tries to get hold of Mike for support, afraid that he will fall off the wagon. Since Mike is busy, Adam goes on a bender. He buys a laptop, masturbates to porn and hires a prostitute.

Dede goes over to Neil's and helps him to clean up his house and burn his porn. She admits that she has never been "just friends" with a man before.

Mike finds Katie's pills, realizing that Danny did not steal them. She tells him off for "always having to be right" and tells him to leave the house. While he is about to relapse with bourbon, Katie calls to tell him Danny is in the hospital after a DUI. Mike hugs his son and apologizes.

After returning to New York, Adam invites Becky over, and they start doing daddy/daughter role play. During it, Becky starts slapping Adam, daring him to slap her back. When he says that he is not into that, she freaks out and starts screaming and crying, then locks herself in the bathroom. Adam calls Neil, who breaks down the bathroom door, discovers that Becky took several pills and takes care of her.

Adam gets sober and apologizes to Phoebe, who recognizes her own trust issues. Neil confronts his inappropriately sexual mother, and the addicts celebrate their sobriety.

== Cast ==
- Mark Ruffalo as Adam
- Tim Robbins as Mike
- Gwyneth Paltrow as Phoebe
- Josh Gad as Neil
- Joely Richardson as Katie
- Alecia Moore as Dede
- Patrick Fugit as Danny
- Carol Kane as Roberta
- Michaela Watkins as Marney
- Isiah Whitlock Jr. as Charles
- Emily Meade as Becky
- Poorna Jagannathan as Lili Kazhani
- Okieriete Onaodowan as Lou

Cameos

- David Wain as SAA Group Member
- Brian Koppelman as SAA Group Member
- Matt Winston as SAA Group Member

== Reception ==
Thanks for Sharing was met with mixed reviews. On Rotten Tomatoes, the film has a positive score of 51% based on 114 reviews, with an average rating of 5.59/10. The site's critics consensus reads: "Thanks For Sharing showcases some fine performances but doesn't delve into its thorny premise as deeply as it should". Metacritic reports a score of 54 out of 100, based on 38 reviews, indicating "Mixed or average reviews".

Richard Roeper gave the film a largely positive review, saying "First-time director Blumberg does a fine job and makes some brave choices." Laremy Legel of Film.com was among the most critical, giving the film a D+, and commenting that it "can't quite find its footing as either a drama or a comedy, and near the end it's actively sliding off the rails". Nigel Barrington of the Daily Chronicle also criticized the film heavily, dubbing it First World Problems: The Movie. Otherwise, Alecia Moore's role was praised by critics. Dan Callahan wrote about her performance saying, "Of all the cast here, the least experienced is the pop singer Pink, yet she does the best acting in the film: natural, a little harsh, a little unstable. Pink, like Macy Gray in her Lee Daniels movie roles, knows instinctively how to behave on camera by just pretending that the camera is not there." Sandy Schaefer praised the film, arguing that "the good elements outweigh the bad in Thanks for Sharing and the final result is a commendable examination of addiction, sex and the nature of grown-up relationships (among other issues that are rarely black and white)."
