= Soul Power (film) =

- Directed by: Jeff Levy-Hinte
- Produced by: Leon Gast; David Sonenberg; Jeff Levy-Hinte
- Cinematography: Paul Goldsmith; Kevin Keating; Albert Maysles; Roderick Young
- Edited by: David Smith
- Production company: Antidote Films
- Distributed by: Sony Pictures Classics (theatrical)
- Release dates: September 4, 2008 (Toronto International Film Festival); July 10, 2009 (United States)
- Running time: 93 minutes
- Country: United States
- Language: English

Soul Power is a 2008 documentary film directed by Jeff Levy-Hinte about the Zaire 74 music festival that took place in Kinshasa, Zaire, in September 1974. Although it was planned to accompany the Rumble in the Jungle heavyweight boxing championship match between Muhammad Ali and George Foreman, the festival went ahead as scheduled when the fight was delayed by 6 weeks after Foreman sustained an injury during training. The film was made from archival footage; other footage shot at the time focusing on the fight was edited to form the 1996 film When We Were Kings.

Performers in the film include James Brown ("Soul Power"), The Spinners ("One of a Kind"), OK Jazz featuring Franco ("Simba Nkoni"j, Bill Withers ("Hope She'll Be Happier"), Miriam Makeba ("Qongqothwane" a.k.a. "The Click Song"), B.B. King ("The Thrill Is Gone"), Pembe Dance Troupe, The Crusaders ("Put It Where You Want It"), Fania All-Stars featuring Celia Cruz, Danny "Big Black" Rey, Afrisa featuring Tabu Ley Rochereau ("Seli-Ja"), The J.B.'s ("Cold Sweat") and Manu Dibango.

The DVD includes bonus tracks by James Brown ("Try Me"), Sister Sledge ("On and On"), and Abeti, and an additional folk dance performance by Pembe Dance Troupe ("Stilts and Bells").

Footage was shot by a variety of camera operators, including Albert Maysles.

== Music, background, and Black Power ==
Music played on stage makes up about half of the running time. The rest comprises documentary clips about the event, including footage of the musicians, and behind-the-scenes planning, such as the stage set-up. The DVD release also includes longer clips with jam sessions and interviews with local citizens.

James Brown performs at the beginning of the film and sings two songs in the end; another of his performances is included as a bonus feature on the DVD. Brown is also shown behind the scenes, and the musicians are seen mixing with the boxers. In one scene, Ali has a short, humorous sparring match with Philippé Wynne of The Spinners.

Many of the artists express their views about Black Power and their role in it. Muhammad Ali is seen before the fight speaking about imperialism and the like, as well as about how important it is for the movement that he win. Comparing New York City with Kinshasa, Ali calls NYC the "real" jungle.

== Reception ==
On the review aggregator website Rotten Tomatoes, 85% of 73 critics' reviews are positive. The website's consensus reads: "Featuring some incredible performances from many 70s soul legends, Soul Power is an exhilarating snap-shot of a bygone era."
