= Pato Hoffmann =

Bolivian actor and theater director (born 1956)

- Born: Erwin Eduardo Hoffmann-Alarcon; 23 August 1956 (age 69); La Paz, Bolivia
- Occupation: Actor
- Years active: 1990–present
- Website: Official website

Erwin Eduardo Hoffmann-Alarcon (born 23 August 1956) is a Bolivian actor and theater director who has performed in such films as Geronimo: An American Legend, Lakota Woman: Siege at Wounded Knee, Cheyenne Warrior and The Last Winter. The nickname "Pato" was given to him as a child. Hoffmann was named the 1999 Indian Celebrity of the Year. He was born in La Paz, Bolivia to Bolivian parents of Aymara, Quechua, Spanish, and German heritage. Hoffmann's family moved to New York City when he was four years old. He thereafter spent the formative years of his childhood and youth alternating between the United States and Bolivia, and more briefly in Mexico.

== Acting career ==
After the success of Dances with Wolves, agents were looking for Native American talent and signed on Hoffmann. His acting career in the U.S., Canada, Australia and Bolivia includes 13 feature films; over 30 episodes of television in series, mini-series, cartoons and soap operas; and numerous plays and readings with reputable theatre companies. His first significant role in a big budget feature film was The Dreamer in Geronimo: An American Legend. Next, he co-starred in the romantic film Cheyenne Warrior as Hawk, a Cheyenne warrior, who is nursed back to health by a pregnant, widowed Rebecca Carver (played by Kelly Preston). In 2006, Hoffmann portrayed the character Lee Means in The Last Winter, playing opposite Ron Perlman.

Hoffmann has been specifically chosen for several roles throughout his acting career to include his role of Lee in The Last Winter, and was asked by Valerie Red-Horse to play her leading man in the film Naturally Native. The film Naturally Native was produced and financed entirely by the Mashantucket Pequot Tribal Nation of Connecticut, and contains one of the sexiest Native American love scenes between Hoffmann and Red-Horse.

Hoffmann is bilingual in Spanish and English, and conversational in Portuguese. He has performed roles in those languages as well as Cheyenne, Apache, Sioux, Creek, Zuni, Aztec and Quechua, demonstrating extraordinary linguistic abilities.

== Education ==
Pato Hoffmann attended college for eight years and was awarded a Bachelor's Degree in Economics with a minor in Anthropology by the American University in Washington, D.C., where he also pursued graduate studies in Agricultural Development as a part of his education in International Development.

== Filmography (partial) ==
- Geronimo: An American Legend (1993) .... The Dreamer
- Dr. Quinn, Medicine Woman (1993–1996, TV Series) .... Franklin / Strong River
- Cheyenne Warrior (1994, TV Movie) .... Hawk
- Lakota Woman: Siege at Wounded Knee (1994, TV Movie) .... Spencer
- A Perry Mason Mystery: The Case of the Grimacing Governor (1994, TV Movie) .... Sgt. Whitehorse
- The Secret of Lizard Woman (1995, TV Series)
- Wild Bill (1995) .... Cheyenne Leader
- Raven Hawk (1996, TV Movie) .... Rhyia's Father
- Profiler (1997, TV Series) .... Carl 'Two Mules' Smythe
- Born Into Exile (1997, TV Movie) .... Detective Sanyo
- The Pretender (1997, TV Series) .... Ronny Tiger
- Naturally Native (1998) .... Steve Bighawk
- Meteorites! (1998, TV Movie) .... Sheriff John Whitehorse
- Pendulum (2001) .... Petty
- A.K.A. Birdseye (2002) .... Alvin Karpis
- The Last Winter (2006) .... Lee Means
- Cielito Lindo (2007, Directed / Produced by Alejandro Alcondez) .... Don Mario

== Current projects ==
- Feature Film: Cielito Lindo
- Feature Film: Jumping off Bridges

== Work as a director ==
As a director, Pato Hoffmann’s credits include Georges Bizet's opera Carmen; the musicals Rent, Cats, Les Misérables, and Oliver; and a half dozen plays in Spanish by Latin American authors. He served as production consultant and acting coach on the award-winning play The Vagina Monologues and the feature length video Autonomía. He worked as a casting associate and consultant in the U.S. and Bolivia.
