= Alan Simpson (actor) =

American actor

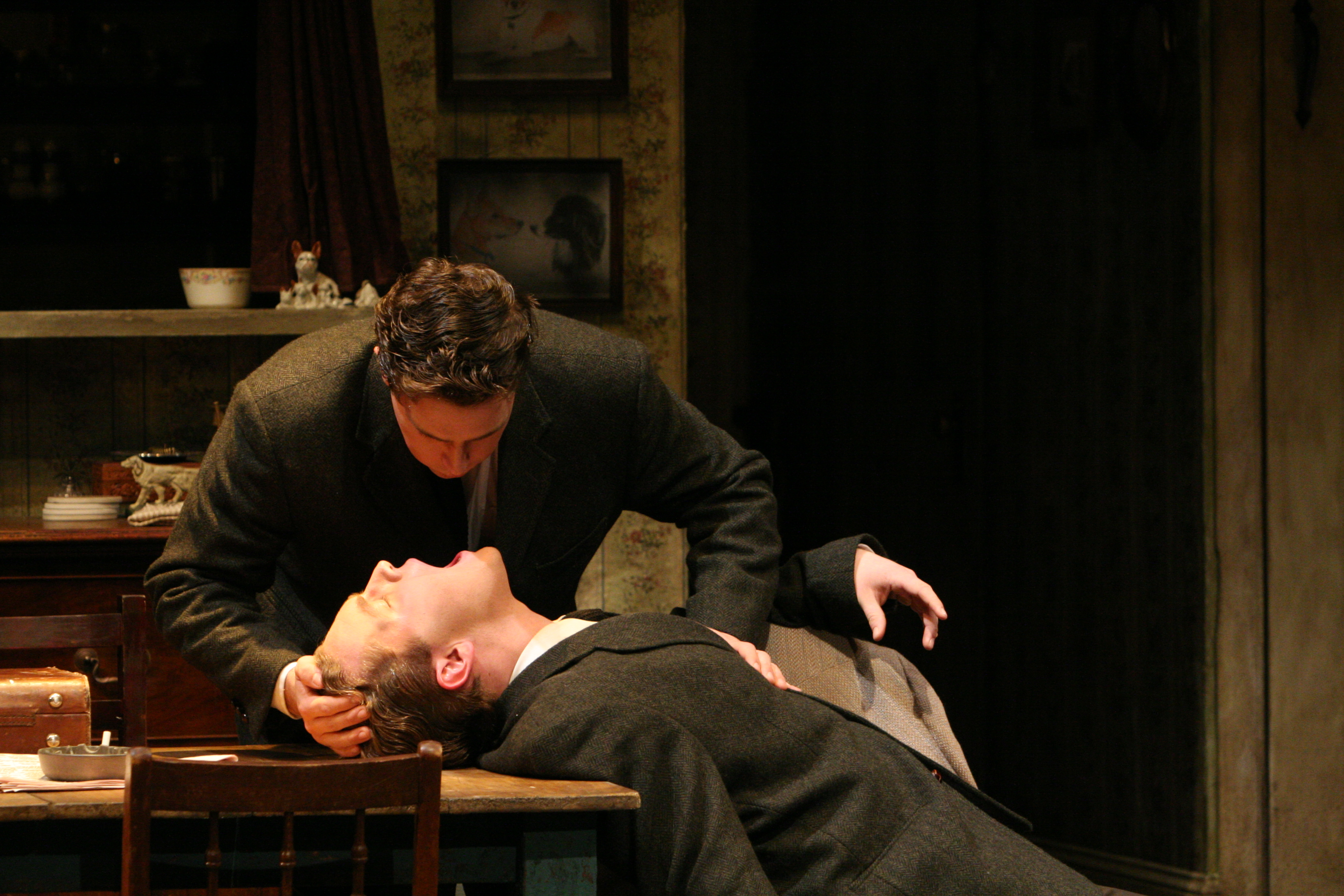
- Simpson as McCann in Act II of The Birthday Party
- Born: October 2, 1983 (age 41)
- Occupation: Actor

Alan Simpson (born October 2, 1983), is an American actor who appeared in the TV series Pasadena as Henry Bellow, Gilmore Girls as Keebler, This Is How the World Ends as Casper Van Dyke, and Freaks and Geeks as Tom. Simpson has carried additional supporting roles in films, such as The Last Five Years, Swelter as "Ronnie", as well as numerous other films.

== Filmography ==
=== Film ===
Year	Title	Role	Notes
2014	Swelter	Ronnie	
2014	The Last Five Years	Ryan James	Uncredited
2015	Emily & Tim	Ethan Lerner	
2019	The Way We Weren't	Steven	

=== Television ===
Year	Title	Role	Notes
1999	Freaks and Geeks	Jock #2 / Tom	2 episodes
2000	This Is How the World Ends	Casper Van Dyke	Television film
2001–2002	Pasadena	Henry Bellow	13 episodes
2003	Gilmore Girls	Keebler	Episode: "The Fundamental Things Apply"
