= Cheyenne Warrior =

1994 TV film

- Written by: Michael B. Druxman
- Directed by: Mark Griffiths
- Starring: Kelly Preston; Dan Haggerty; Pato Hoffmann
- Music by: Arthur Kempel
- Country of origin: United States
- Original language: English

Production
- Executive producers: Roger Corman; Lance H. Robbins
- Producer: Mike Elliott
- Cinematography: Blake T. Evans
- Editor: Roderick Davis
- Running time: 90 minutes
- Production company: Libra Pictures

Original release
- Network: Starz
- Release: July 22, 1994

Cheyenne Warrior is a 1994 American Western television film written by Michael B. Druxman, directed by Mark Griffiths, and stars Kelly Preston, Dan Haggerty and Pato Hoffmann. The film follows the struggle of a widowed, pregnant woman who is stranded at a trading post during the American Civil War.

== Plot summary ==
As war brews between the Union and the Confederate States of America, Matthew and Rebecca travel to the west to start a new life in Oregon. Along the way, they stop at a remote trading post, where they meet up with some Cheyenne Indians. Though the Cheyenne are friendly toward the pioneers, Matthew does not like them and warns a group of hunters that hostile Indians are preparing for an attack. In the confrontation that results, only a pregnant Rebecca and a single wounded Cheyenne warrior named Hawk are left alive. As the winter closes in, and the two are forced to rely on each other for survival, they begin to fall in love.

== Cast ==
- Kelly Preston as Rebecca Carver
- Pato Hoffmann as Hawk
- Bo Hopkins as Jack Andrews
- Dan Haggerty as Barkley
- Clint Howard as Otto Nielsen
- Rick Dean as Daniel Kearney
- Charles Edwin Powell as Matthew Carver
- Noah Colton as Matthew Carver Jr.
- Louise Baker as Pioneer Woman
- Nik Winterhawk as Tall Elk
- Patricia Van Ingen as Crow Woman
- Frankie Avina as Crazy Buffalo
- Joseph Wolves Kill as Running Wolf
- Terrance Fredricks as Little Rabbit
- Mark S. Brien as Spotted Face
- Mark Cota as Yellow Moccasin
- Jules Desjarlais as Warrior
- Danny Lee Clark as Red Knife
- Jesse James Youngblood as Owl Eyes
- Ezra Gabey as Iron Bear
- Lewis Ninham as Mole On Face
