= Ilia Volok =

Ukrainian actor (b. 1960s)

- Ілля Волох
- Born: Illia Andriyovych Volok; November 22, 1964 (age 61); Kiev, Ukrainian SSR, Soviet Union (now Kyiv, Ukraine)
- Other name: Ilia Volokh
- Education: Moscow Art Theatre School
- Occupation: Actor
- Years active: 1994–present

Ilia Andriyovych Volok (Ukrainian: Ілля Андрійович Волох, romanized: Illia Andriyovych Volokh; born November 22, 1964) is a Ukrainian actor, based in the United States. He has appeared in over 170 films, television series, and video games since his debut in 1994.

== Early life ==
Volok was born in Kyiv on November 22, 1964. Prior to his acting career, he was a member of the Soviet national rowing team, finishing third place in the Men's Pair at the 1982 World Rowing Junior Championships, and later becoming Ukrainian national champion.

He studied at the Moscow Art Theatre School under Alexander Kalyagin. He worked as a professional stage actor in Russia, before emigrating to the United States at the age of 26, in 1990. He initially supplemented his income by working in a cemetery.

== Career ==
Volok has appeared in more than 90 films and television programs. He starred as Vladimir Krasin in Air Force One and portrayed Master Org in Power Rangers Wild Force. Additionally, he has had recurring roles in General Hospital and The Young and the Restless. He guest starred in an episode of Friends in which reference was made to Air Force One without mentioning him as one of its actors.

Volok frequently performs on stage. He co-wrote, co-created, and starred as the title character in the comedy play Fakov in America. He plays a leading part in Cat's Paw, an Actors Studio project. In Diary of a Madman by short story writer Nikolai Gogol. The character Vladimir Kamarivsky in the Electronic Arts video game Battlefield 3 is modeled after and voiced by Volok. Volok also plays and voices the character Vladislav "Vlad" Kozak in the Overkill Software video game Payday 2.

He won the 2013 LA Weekly Theater Award for Best Solo Performance for his role in Diary of a Madman.

== Personal life ==
Volok splits his time between Los Angeles and Paris. He is married to an American woman.

Volok is fluent in Ukrainian, Russian, English, and proficient in several other languages.

== Filmography ==
- 1994 Hail Caesar as Wlad
- 1995 Midnight Man as Slav
- 1996 Police Story 4: First Strike as Russian Group No. 9
- 1996 Executive Decision as Chechen Thug
- 1997 Air Force One as Vladimir Krasin
- 1997 U Turn as Sergi
- 1997 Plan B as "Flash"
- 1998 Best of the Best 4: Without Warning as Ilia
- 1999 One Man's Hero as Daniel Grzbalski
- 1999 Kolobos "Faceless"
- 2000 Night All Day as Karloff
- 2000 Camera Obscura as Taxi Driver
- 2000 Friends as The Dry Cleaner
- 2000 Shadow Hours as Russian
- 2000 Between Christmas and New Year's as Ilia
- 2001 Monkeybone as Rasputin
- 2001 Swordfish as Gabriel's Crew
- 2001 The Quickie as Slava
- 2002 Power Rangers Wild Force (TV Series) as Reincarnated Master Org / Dr. Viktor Adler
- 2002 Firefly (TV Series, 1 episode) as Marco
- 2002 Boris (Short) as Yuri
- 2002 Judging Amy (TV Series, 1 episode) as Trajan Popovici
- 2002 Six Feet Under (TV Series, 2 episodes) as Yuri
- 2003 The King of Queens (TV Series, 1 episode) as Andrei
- 2003 Monk (TV Series, 1 episode) as Nikolai Petroff
- 2003 Spinning Boris as Elvis Impersonator
- 2004 The D.A. (TV Series, 1 episode) as Davonovich
- 2003–2005 Alias (TV Series, 2 episodes) as Ushek San'ko
- 2005 Commander in Chief (TV Series, 1 episode) as Dmitri Kharkov
- 2006 The Unit (TV Series, 1 episode) as Deputy Grubo
- 2006 CSI: NY (TV Series, 1 episode) as Gabe
- 2006 Domestic Import as Sasha
- 2006 Company Town (TV Movie) as Yuri
- 2007 The Young and the Restless (TV Series) as Milan
- 2007 The Wedding Bells (TV Series, 1 episode) as "Wolfie"
- 2007 Burn Notice (TV Series, 1 episode) as Jan Haseck
- 2007 The Red Chalk (Short) as Young Stalin
- 2007 Charlie Wilson's War as Russian Helicopter Pilot
- 2008 1% (TV) as Russian Ranger No. 1
- 2008 Las Vegas (TV Series, 1 episode) as Rudy Vinovich
- 2008 Indiana Jones and the Kingdom of the Crystal Skull as Russian Suit No. 2
- 2008 Primo as Egor Denko
- 2008 Identity Crisis as Drunken Russian
- 2008 La-La Loco Baby as Kazimir
- 2008 The Curious Case of Benjamin Button as Russian Interpreter
- 2008 Worst Week (TV Series, 1 episode) as Vanya
- 2008 General Hospital (TV Series) as Andrei Karpov
- 2009 Hired Gun as Yegor
- 2009 Without a Trace (TV Series, 1 episode) as Yuri
- 2009 The Soloist as Harry Barnoff
- 2009 Rogue Warrior (Video Game) as Russian 1
- 2010 Treasure of the Black Jaguar as Gregor
- 2010 Cielito Lindo as Borowski
- 2011 The Bad Penny as Terry Rubelev
- 2011 Water for Elephants as Mr. Jankowski
- 2011 Abduction as "Sweater"
- 2011 Battlefield 3 (Video Game) as Vladimir Kamarivsky (voice)
- 2011 Mission: Impossible – Ghost Protocol as "The Fog"
- 2012 Femme Fatales (TV Series, 1 episode) as Dimitri "Uzi" Olesky
- 2013 G.I. Joe: Retaliation as Russian Leader
- 2013 The Immigrant as Wojtek Bistricky
- 2013 Payday 2 (Video Game) as Vlad
- 2014 Agents of S.H.I.E.L.D. (TV Series) as Vladimir
- 2014 The Last Ship (TV Series) as Dmitri Belenko
- 2014 Pawn Sacrifice as KGB Guy
- 2015 How to Be a Gangster in America as Dimitri
- 2016 Taking Liberty as Boss
- 2017 Finding Mother as Uncle Borya
- 2017 Prey (Video Game) as Luka Golubkin (voice)
- 2018 Hunter Killer as Captain Vlade Sutrev
- 2019 Magnum P.I. (TV Series, 1 Episode) as Sergei
- 2019 The Punisher (TV Series, 1 Episode) as Kazan
- 2019 Gemini Man as Yuri Kovács
- 2023 Payday 3 (Video Game) as Vlad
- 2023 The Palace as Ambasador Rosji
- 2023 Self Reliance as Mario
- 2024 Diarra from Detroit as The Russian
- 2025 Idiotka as Vlad
- 2026 Big Mistakes as Andrei
- 2026 The Accompanist as Alyosha
- 2026 "The Terminal List" as The Colonel
