= The Last Winter (2006 film) =

2006 horror film by Larry Fessenden

- Theatrical release poster
- Directed by: Larry Fessenden
- Written by: Larry Fessenden; Robert Leaver
- Produced by: Larry Fessenden; Jeffrey Levy-Hinte
- Starring: Ron Perlman; Pato Hoffmann; James LeGros; Connie Britton; Suyash Pachauri
- Cinematography: G. Magni Ágústsson
- Music by: Jeff Grace
- Production companies: Antidote Films; Glass Eye Pix; Zik Zak Filmworks
- Distributed by: IFC Films
- Release dates: September 11, 2006 (TIFF); September 1, 2007 (US)
- Running time: 107 minutes
- Countries: United States; Iceland
- Language: English
- Budget: $7 million
- Box office: $97,522

The Last Winter is a 2006 horror film directed by Larry Fessenden. The Last Winter premiered in The Contemporary World Cinema Programme at the 2006 Toronto International Film Festival on September 11, 2006. The script for the film originally featured a more woodsy Alaska with pine trees and it was after a research trip to Prudhoe Bay that they discovered the harsh flat conditions that ultimately ended up in the film. The movie received mostly positive reviews from critics, praised for its tension and character dynamics.

== Plot ==
The American oil company K.I.K. Corporation is building an ice road to explore the remote northern Arctic National Wildlife Refuge, seeking energy independence. Independent environmentalists work together in a drilling base headed by the tough Ed Pollack in a sort of agreement with the government, approving procedures and sending reports of the operation. A friendly football game outside of the housing area is interrupted when environmental scientist Elliot accidentally collides with rookie oil worker Maxwell, resulting in Elliot getting a bloody nose. That night, Maxwell is disturbed by the sighting of a spectral herd of caribou charging past the camp; the eerie sight of the ghostly animals unnerves him.

The next day, Maxwell is dispatched to check on one of the sites the drilling team is working on and mysteriously goes missing for most of the day. He stumbles back to camp that night traumatized, just as the others are about to head out into the wastes to look for him, claiming that his radio had not been working – Hoffman checks the radio, which states Maxwell walked 300 miles. Maxwell gets into an angry confrontation with environmental scientist James Hoffman, admitting that he did not want to work on the oil site but his father, a friend of Pollack, thought it would be good for him; Maxwell states that he "saw something" out in the snow and demands that Hoffman, who has repeatedly been raising the alarm about drilling in the area due to the extremely warm (for Alaska) temperature, tells the public.

That night, Maxwell, still partly delirious, strips naked and ventures out with a video camera, intending to document the paranormal phenomena. He captures the spectral herd of caribou passing on camera before something strikes him from behind. When he is found dead out on the snow the next morning, Hoffman suspects that sour gas (natural gas containing hydrogen sulfide) may have been leaked out as a result of runaway climate change (arctic methane release). The sour gas might then be provoking hallucinations and insanity in the group.

Elliot, Hoffman's partner, attempts to e-mail the outside world, but can't get a signal; he then dies shortly thereafter, possibly of a brain aneurysm. Hoffman had refused to sign off on permission for heavy equipment to be brought in to help move drilling equipment due to potential damage to the tundra earlier in the film; Pollack and his boss, Foster, arrange for Hoffman to be replaced as a result. Hoffman convinces Ed to travel with the team to a hospital for examination after Elliot's death; however, the bush plane arriving to pick them up crashes into their building, badly damaging it. Gary, the pilot, and the replacement environmental scientist, Marshowitz, are both killed in the crash; Foster is horrifically burned, but manages to live out the night before dying.

Native Alaskan worker Lee vanishes without a trace the next morning; the sound of hooves, the same sound which occurred prior to each appearance of the ghostly caribou, is heard. The only thing left are his boots, still propped up as if someone was standing in them. His fellow Native Alaskan worker, Dawn, goes insane shortly thereafter and murders Motor, the station mechanic, who had been injured when the plane crashed into the building. Abby stumbles upon the scene and, in an altercation with Dawn, pushes her over a shelf, causing Dawn to fall and break her neck.

One of the characters presently opines that nature itself has turned against mankind. Documentation and research found in an abandoned shack in the middle of the Arctic by another team member suggest that the Earth is releasing 'The Last Winter'. This implies that the rapacious, virus-like behavior of oil-seeking humans has resurrected the 'ghosts' of the fossil-fuels being siphoned out of the ground. The chief catalyst is allegedly the spirit of the Wendigo. Dawn, while treating one of Elliot's nose bleeds, refers to a similar spirit from Algonquin mythology known as the Chenoo.

In the penultimate scene, Hoffman must decide whether to fire a flare gun at a ghost stalking Pollack, or up into the air to summon help from a nearby town, opting for the latter. This action causes the creature, a massive, ghostly moose, to focus on Hoffman instead of Pollack, and it grabs him and carries him off. The scene then segues into a montage of past life images, which interrupt themselves long enough to reveal Pollack being attacked and presumably killed by a trio of spectral creatures.

The ending scene is that of the only surviving researcher, Abby Sellers, waking up alone in a deserted hospital with no recollection of arriving there. A news anchorman is broadcasting over a television in the waiting room about natural disasters occurring nationwide. She discovers a male employee who has committed suicide by hanging himself in one of the rooms. She proceeds outside, and the camera's perspective switches to a claustrophobic overhead shot that gives away very little of what she is witnessing. There are pools of water on the ground nearby. In the background she hears car alarms and the sound of the wind, as well as a fluttering noise similar to that made by the murderous "ghost" creatures further north in the Alaskan snow fields.

== Cast ==
- Ron Perlman as Ed Pollack
- James LeGros as James Hoffman
- Connie Britton as Abby Sellers
- Zach Gilford as Maxwell McKinder
- Kevin Corrigan as Motor
- Jamie Harrold as Elliot Jenkins
- Suyash Pachauri as OTT
- Pato Hoffmann as Lee Means
- Joanne Shenandoah as Dawn Russell
- Larry Fessenden as Charles Foster

== Production ==
Fessenden's first idea for the script involved a Muslim and a non-Muslim forced to depend on each other in a remote location. This was later mixed with and refined by other ideas that involved the Arctic National Wildlife Refuge and global warming. The idea of stranding two people with radically different outlooks was subsequently incorporated into the film's ending. The setting was partially inspired by Endurance: Shackleton's Incredible Voyage, a non-fiction book about wilderness survival in the Antarctic. Fessenden brought in co-writer Robert Leaver to collaborate with, and the two went back and forth on various ideas. Fessenden said, "Ultimately I wanted to show how an individual’s worldview affects how he or she deals with reality." When writing the characters, Fessenden gave Pollack ideas and personality traits that he could relate to while keeping the character's outlook reactionary. For Fessenden, this demonstrated a common American outlook that he wanted to highlight as having to change to fit the needs a changing world. Fessenden said the monsters are not to be taken literally and are "a manifestation within Hoffman's mind".

When casting the film, Fessenden looked to recruit Perlman because of his gruff performance as the title character in Hellboy. LeGros and Britton are actors that Fessenden enjoys, and he wanted to give them starring roles. Funding came from the Icelandic Film Commission and Katapult. Shooting took place in both Iceland and Alaska. Iceland was chosen because of the poor film infrastructure in Alaska, and Canada – the other obvious shooting location – was not flat or snowy enough. Fessenden credited shooting some scenes in Alaska with adding authenticity to the film and further inspiring him to make changes to the script as he scouted locations.

== Release ==
The Last Winter premiered at the Toronto International Film Festival. The U.S. cable channel IFC had been supportive of Fessenden's career and often played his films. When someone from IFC Films said he liked the film, Fessenden sought out a distribution deal from them. They released it in the US on September 19, 2007, where it grossed $33,190. It grossed another $64,332 internationally, for a worldwide total of $97,522.

== Reception ==
Rotten Tomatoes, a review aggregator, reports that 76% of 50 surveyed critics gave the film a positive review; the average rating is 6.7/10. The site's consensus reads: "The Last Winter creatively and effectively uses horror tactics – fear, tension, anticipation, and just enough gore – to shock, but never repulse, its audience." Metacritic rated it 69/100 based on 17 reviews. Dennis Harvey of Variety called it "an imperfect but compelling thriller" that returns to Fessenden's interest in character dynamics, atmosphere, and offbeat narrative ideas rather than genre cliches. Manohla Dargis of The New York Times selected it as a "NYT Critics' Pick" and wrote that it "breathes fresh air into a stale setup", comparing it to the "elegantly restrained horror" of Val Lewton. In describing it as a traditional Gothic horror story, Carina Chocano of the Los Angeles Times wrote that it "accomplishes with a modest budget and a talented cast what bigger, slicker, gorier contemporary horror movies rarely do".
