= Chain (film) =

- Directed by: Jem Cohen
- Written by: Jem Cohen
- Produced by: Jem Cohen; Mary Jane Skalski
- Starring: Miho Nikaido; Mira Billotte
- Cinematography: Jem Cohen
- Edited by: Jem Cohen; Davey Frankel
- Music by: Godspeed You! Black Emperor
- Production company: Antidote Films
- Distributed by: Gravity Hill Films
- Release date: August 22, 2004 (EIFF)
- Running time: 99 minutes
- Language: English

Chain is a 2004 docufiction film written and directed by Jem Cohen. It follows two young women from opposite ends of the socioeconomic spectrum. One (Miho Nikaido) is a Japanese professional who has been sent by her corporation to inspect theme parks in the United States. The other (Mira Billotte) is a runaway who is squatting near a mall and works a series of dead-end jobs. The women never meet or communicate with each other, but by the end of the film, their viewpoints have become similar as their lives are both impacted by the homogenization of retail culture and infrastructure.

It has been described as a "narrative/documentary" hybrid, with Stephen Holden of The New York Times saying it "deliberately blurs the lines between fiction, documentary and cinematic essay."

== Plot ==
Tamiko, a corporate executive from Japan, is sent to the United States by her company, which is looking to enter the theme park business with a venture potentially called "Floating World". Her assignment is to compile information on American theme parks and report the findings to her bosses. Amanda, a young homeless drifter, squats in an abandoned warehouse across the street from a mall. While working a series of short-term jobs, including as a concessions worker on a sightseeing boat and as a cleaning woman at a motel, she records a video diary that she intends to send to estranged family. Amanda and Tamiko's lives and differences are contrasted. Increasingly, both women are changed by the loss of regional identity due to the similarity of retail culture worldwide.

== Cast ==
- Miho Nikaido as Tamiko
- Mira Billotte as Amanda
- Tarik O'Regan as Currency Trader
- Rick Aquino as Piano Store Salesman
- Douglas A. Scocco as Piano Store Salesman
- Bill Stuckey as TV Announcer
- Minda Martin as Amanda's Half-Sister
- Robert C. Gibson as Motel Manager
- Anne Truitt as Woman in Car and Parking Lot

== Production ==
Jem Cohen said the original idea behind the film was to take structures that seemed out of place in a photograph, such as billboards or franchise restaurants, and put them front and center. He commented, "We’re so surrounded by malls and logos, big-box stores and all, but they seem to take on this weird invisibility...I shot them for years, using fine-grain 16 mm film to do it more clearly. A sort of archive of nothingness."

An influence on the film was the Barbara Ehrenreich book Nickel and Dimed, which investigates the difficulties faced by low-wage workers in America.

The fictional storyline of the two women was interwoven into the footage Cohen shot over several years at malls, hotels and office parks in Europe, the continental US, Japan, and Australia.

== Release ==
The filmed premiered at the 2004 Berlinale and in the United Kingdom on August 22, 2004 at the Edinburgh International Film Festival. In Belgium, it premiered on October 6, 2004 at the Flanders International Film Festival. In France, it premiered at the Belfont Entrevues Film Festival on November 30, 2004. Its American debut was at the Museum of Modern Art and festivals included the Independent Film Festival of Boston on April 23, 2005. The film was given a brief theatrical run at Manhattan's Independent Film Center.

== Critical reception ==
On Rotten Tomatoes, Chain has an approval rating of 63% based on 8 reviews.

Ed Halter of The Village Voice called the film "a dreamlike travelogue that transforms a mundane world into something strange and new." In his review for The New York Times, Stephen Holden wrote, "For all its bleakness, the movie, filmed in nearly a dozen states and in half a dozen countries, is not without a certain beauty. There is comfort to be found in blandness and homogeneity. And late in the film, when the camera lingers on a landscape darkening under a blood-red sunset, its evocation of human civilization at its twilight stirs up a piercing sadness." Kieron Corless of Time Out London wrote "Cohen shows how [Tamiko and Amanda] manage to map their way through this social landscape with courage and dignity, finding something worthwhile, even redemptive and beautiful, in their solitary lives."

== Accolades ==
Chain won the Someone to Watch award at the 2005 Independent Spirit Awards. At the Belfort Entrevues Film Festival, the film won the Prix Leo Scheer Award. The film also made the Ten Most Promising Films of the Year list of at the Montreal World Film Festival.
