= Stuart Blumberg =

American screenwriter & actor

- Born: July 19, 1969 (age 57); United States
- Education: Yale University
- Occupations: Screenwriter; Producer; Director
- Years active: 1996–present
- Spouse: Mia Moross (m. 2017)

Stuart Blumberg (born July 19, 1969) is an American screenwriter, actor, producer and director.

== Early life ==
Blumberg grew up in Shaker Heights, Ohio and graduated from University School. He is of Jewish descent. He graduated from Yale University in 1991 with a BA in History, where Edward Norton was a roommate.

== Career ==
Blumberg was nominated for an Oscar for Best Original Screenplay in 2010 for co-writing The Kids Are All Right.

Blumberg made his directorial debut with the Hollywood film Thanks for Sharing starring Mark Ruffalo, Tim Robbins, Gwyneth Paltrow, Josh Gad, Joely Richardson, and Alecia Moore. The film is about sex addiction and how a group of New Yorkers deal with recovery.

== Filmography ==
=== As director ===
- Thanks for Sharing (2012)
- She Said, She Said (short, 2013)
- The Testament (TBA)

=== As writer ===
- MADtv (TV series, 1996)
- Keeping the Faith (2000)
- The Girl Next Door (2004)
- The Kids Are All Right (2010)
- Thanks for Sharing (2012)
