= Julian Goldberger =

American film director

Julian Goldberger is an independent film director and musician based in Los Angeles.

His feature film directing debut, Trans, screened at the 1998 Toronto International Film Festival, 1999 Sundance Film Festival, 1999 Berlin International Film Festival (READERS’ JURY PRIZE for BEST FILM), 1999 New Directors/New Films Festival at New York City's Museum of Modern Art, as well as various other international festivals.

Mr. Goldberger was honored as an Independent Spirit Award nominee for the Movado Someone To Watch Award, recognizing talented up-and-coming directors with a singular vision.

In 2006, his second narrative feature, an adaptation of the Harry Crews novel The Hawk Is Dying (2006) starring Paul Giamatti, Michael Pitt, and Michelle Williams, premiered in competition at the Sundance Film Festival. It also screened in the Director's Fortnight Competition at the 2006 Cannes Film Festival. Both of his films are part of the Sundance Collection at the UCLA Film & Television Archives.

In 2011 Goldberger joined the faculty at NYU's graduate film program, Tisch Asia, teaching there through 2014.

Since 2019 Goldberger has been releasing experimental ambient albums under the moniker Eulipion Corps. His work has been featured in the global sound project, Cities and Memory, and has been archived in the British Library's Sound & Moving Image Catalogue. Several of his Eulipion Corps albums were distributed by the UK label Wormhole World. He's also a founding member and guitarist for the acclaimed psych/prog band Vitskär Süden.

Goldberger teaches at Chapman University, as well as UCLA Extension—Entertainment Studies & Writers Program.

== Filmography ==
- Trans (1998)
- The Hawk Is Dying (2006)

== Albums as Eulipion Corps ==
- Orphans of the Sky (2019)
- Orphans of the Helix (2020)
- Beth Om (2020)
- Friendly Islands (2021)
- Prayers to Yonder (2021)
- Mt Wilson (2021)
- Aenean Fields (2022)
- Rites & Mysteries (2022)

== Vitskär Süden albums ==
- Vitskär Süden (2020)
- The Faceless King (2022)
