= Mysterious Skin =

2004 film by Gregg Araki

- Theatrical release poster
- Directed by: Gregg Araki
- Screenplay by: Gregg Araki
- Based on: Mysterious Skin by Scott Heim
- Produced by: Gregg Araki
- Starring: Joseph Gordon-Levitt; Brady Corbet; Michelle Trachtenberg; Jeff Licon; Bill Sage; Mary Lynn Rajskub; Elisabeth Shue
- Cinematography: Steve Gainer
- Edited by: Gregg Araki
- Music by: Harold Budd; Robin Guthrie
- Production companies: Fortissimo Films; Antidote Films; Desperate Pictures
- Distributed by: Tartan Films (United Kingdom); TLA Releasing (United States); 1More Film (Netherlands)
- Release dates: September 3, 2004 (Venice); May 6, 2005 (United States); May 25, 2005 (Netherlands)
- Running time: 105 minutes
- Countries: United States; Netherlands
- Language: English
- Box office: $2.1 million

Mysterious Skin is a 2004 coming-of-age drama film written, produced, and directed by Gregg Araki, adapted from Scott Heim's 1995 novel of the same name. The film tells the story of two pre-adolescent boys who both experienced sexual abuse, and how it affects their lives in different ways into their young adulthood. One boy becomes a reckless, sexually adventurous prostitute (played by Joseph Gordon-Levitt), while the other (Brady Corbet) retreats into a reclusive fantasy of alien abduction.

Mysterious Skin premiered at the 61st Venice International Film Festival in September 2004, moving into wider distribution in May 2005 without a rating. It grossed $2.1 million at the box office and received critical acclaim. Psychologists have praised Mysterious Skin for its accurate depiction of the long-term effects of child sexual abuse.

== Plot ==
During the summer of 1981, two eight-year-old Little League teammates, Neil McCormick and Brian Lackey, both experience life-altering events in Hutchinson, Kansas. Neil, the son of an irresponsible single mother and already discovering his own homosexuality, is sexually abused by the Little League coach, who leaves town after that summer. Neil views the coach's abuse as love, and develops an attraction to older men. Brian, whose parents are often neglectful or busy working, only remembers that it started to rain during a game and that he later awoke in the crawl space of his house with a bloody nose, with no memory of the intervening five hours.

In 1987, at the age of 15, Neil begins engaging in sex work. He continues to do so four years later when he moves to New York City, where his best friend Wendy Peterson now lives. In New York, Neil has an emotional encounter with a client who is dying from AIDS and only wants to be touched. Afterward, Neil begins withdrawing from sex work and takes a job at a local sandwich shop with assistance and encouragement from Wendy.

Meanwhile, Brian has been suffering from chronic nosebleeds, blackouts, and incontinence since the night he found himself in the crawl space. His recurring dreams about being touched by a strange, bluish hand eventually lead Brian to suspect he may have been abducted by aliens as a child. Another boy wearing the same Little League uniform begins to appear in these dreams later on. Brian meets a woman named Avalyn Friesen, who also claims to have had an alien encounter. They start to form a friendship, but when she makes sexual advances toward him, he panics and refuses to speak to her again.

As he struggles to uncover his repressed memories, Brian finds a photo of his Little League team and recognizes a young Neil as the other boy from his dreams. Meanwhile, Neil returns to Hutchinson to spend Christmas with his mother after being brutally raped and beaten by a client. There, he and Brian meet for the first time in over a decade.

After breaking into the house that was previously rented by the Little League coach, Neil reveals to Brian the truth about what happened that night - the coach offered to drive Brian home with Neil after a baseball game was rained out, as Brian did not have a ride. Instead, they all went to the coach's house, where he performed sex acts on the boys, as well as forcing them to perform sex acts on each other. By the end of the night, Brian collapsed face-first onto the floor, causing his nosebleed. A porch light caused the atmosphere to have an eerie blue color, contributing to his later delusion about being abducted by aliens as a child. Realizing that his previous understanding was merely a coping mechanism after enduring sexual abuse, Brian breaks down crying and is comforted by Neil as Christmas carolers outside sing "Silent Night".

== Cast ==
- Joseph Gordon-Levitt as Neil McCormick
  - Chase Ellison as young Neil McCormick
- Brady Corbet as Brian Lackey
  - George Webster as young Brian Lackey
- Michelle Trachtenberg as Wendy Peterson
  - Riley McGuire as young Wendy Peterson
- Jeff Licon as Eric Preston
- Mary Lynn Rajskub as Avalyn Friesen
- Elisabeth Shue as Ellen McCormick
- Bill Sage as Coach
- Chris Mulkey and Lisa Long as George and Margaret Lackey
- Richard Riehle as Charlie
- Kelly Kruger as Deborah Lackey
  - Rachael Nastassja Kraft as young Deborah Lackey
- Billy Drago as Zeke

== Production ==
Both Joseph Gordon-Levitt and Michelle Trachtenberg, by the time the film went into production, were looking for independent films where making money was not the main goal. Trachtenberg was filming EuroTrip (2004) in Prague when she first received the script, and quickly decided to join production. Gordon-Levitt was especially fulsome in his praise of Araki for allowing him to join production, commenting in a 2005 interview: "It is a really different role for me, and I'll always be really grateful to Gregg for believing that I could do a role like this. I've played the nice kid, and the smart one or funny one and even the angry one, but Gregg was the first one to call me sexy, and I'll always be really grateful for that." Araki approached Gordon-Levitt, who was by then struggling to find work for over a year, after seeing him in Manic (2001). Made on a low budget, filming commenced in August 2003 and lasted only three weeks, which gave the cast and crew no possibility of doing retakes. In a 2024 interview, the actor for the sexually abusive coach, Bill Sage, revealed that he went through child sexual abuse himself, which encouraged him to take on the role and "show how normal abusers can appear."

A number of measures were taken to avoid exposing the child actors to the sexual and abusive aspects of the story. Although their parents were given the entire shooting script to review, the boys were given separate scripts which included only the activities they would be performing, while their roles and the characters' relationships were explained to them in innocent terms. All of the sexual abuse involving children is implied rather than directly depicted, and the scenes in which this seduction and abuse takes place were filmed with each actor performing alone and addressing the camera and edited together. This was to spare the children from having to deal with the abusive nature of the other character's part.

== Reception ==
Mysterious Skin received an 87% rating on review aggregator Rotten Tomatoes based on 109 reviews with an average rating of 7.40/10. The site's consensus states: "Bold performances and sensitive, spot-on direction make watching this difficult tale of trauma and abuse a thought-provoking, resonant experience." On Metacritic, which uses a weighted average, the film has a score of 74 out of 100 based on 32 critics indicating generally favourable reviews.

Ella Taylor from LA Weekly wrote "A warped, but beautiful and strangely hopeful, coming-of-age tale." Roger Ebert gave Mysterious Skin 3.5 out of a possible 4 stars, describing it as "at once the most harrowing and, strangely, the most touching film I have seen about child abuse". Steven Rea of The Philadelphia Inquirer awarded the film 3 out of 4 stars, stating that Mysterious Skin ultimately "manages to deal with its raw, awful subject matter in ways that are both challenging and illuminating". Gordon-Levitt was praised by critics for his performance, and the actor has stated that people on the streets had come up to him to applaud his performance in the film. His portrayal of a teenage hustler inspired director Scott Frank to cast him in The Lookout (2007).

In 2025, it was one of the films voted for the "Readers' Choice" edition of The New York Times' list of "The 100 Best Movies of the 21st Century," finishing at number 184.

According to psychologist Richard Gartner, the novel Mysterious Skin is an uncommonly accurate portrayal of the long-term effect of child sexual abuse on boys.

=== Rating issues ===
The US MPAA rated the film NC-17, which the studio appealed unsuccessfully. The film was released theatrically in the US without a rating.

Mysterious Skin was the subject of some controversy in Australia, where the Australian Family Association requested a review of its classification, seeking to have the film outlawed due to its depiction of pedophilia. They suggested that the film could be used by pedophiles for sexual gratification or to help them groom children for sexual abuse. The six-member Classification Review Board voted four-to-two in favour of maintaining an R18+ rating. The controversy is referenced in a review excerpt from The Sydney Morning Herald on the Region 4 DVD that reads: "How anyone could have wanted it banned is beyond me"; film critic Margaret Pomeranz evinced that the film does more for the case against pedophilia, stating: "People who do indulge in crimes like that, if they saw this film they would understand the damage that they do."

== Soundtrack ==
The film score was composed by Harold Budd and Robin Guthrie.

Other songs include:

1. "Golden Hair" – Slowdive (written by Syd Barrett)
2. "Galaxy" – Curve
3. "Game Show" – Dag Gabrielsen, Bill Campbell, Nelson Foltz, Robert Roe
4. "Catch the Breeze" – Slowdive
5. "Crushed" – Cocteau Twins
6. "Dagger" – Slowdive
7. "I Guess I Fell in Love Last Night" – Dag Gabrielsen, Alex Lacamoire
8. "I Could Do Without Her" – Dag Gabrielsen, Alex Lacamoire
9. "Drive Blind" – Ride
10. "O Come All Ye Faithful" – Tom Meredith, Cydney Neal, Arlo Levin, Isaiah Teofilo
11. "Away in a Manger" – Tom Meredith, Cydney Neal, Arlo Levin, Isaiah Teofilo
12. "Silent Night" – Tom Meredith, Cydney Neal, Arlo Levin, Isaiah Teofilo, Evan Rachel Wood, John Mason
13. "Samskeyti" – Sigur Rós

== Awards ==
- 2004 Bergen International Film Festival – Jury Award
- 2006 Polished Apple Awards – Best Movie
- 2006 Icelandic Queer Film Festival – Best Fictional Work
