= The Hawk Is Dying =

- Promotional poster
- Directed by: Julian Goldberger
- Written by: Julian Goldberger
- Based on: The Hawk Is Dying by Harry Crews
- Produced by: Jeffrey Levy-Hinte; Mary Jane Skalski
- Starring: Paul Giamatti; Michelle Williams; Michael Pitt; Robert Wisdom; Ann Wedgeworth
- Cinematography: Bobby Bukowski
- Edited by: Affonso Gonçalves
- Music by: Jonathan Goldberger
- Production companies: This is that; Antidote Films; Exile Productions; Next Wednesday Productions; Big Heart Pictures
- Distributed by: Strand Releasing
- Release dates: January 21, 2006 (Sundance); March 30, 2007 (United States)
- Running time: 106 minutes
- Country: United States
- Language: English

The Hawk Is Dying is a 2006 American drama film written and directed by Julian Goldberger, based on the 1973 novel of the same name by Harry Crews. It stars Paul Giamatti, Michelle Williams, and Michael Pitt. The film premiered at the 2006 Sundance Film Festival, and was also accepted to the 2006 Director's Fortnight Competition at the Cannes Film Festival. It released to theatres in New York City and Los Angeles on March 30, 2007.

== Plot ==
George Gattling, a Gainesville, Florida auto upholsterer, is a man out of place in the world and out of place in his own skin.

Gattling attempts to transcend his mundane life by training a wild red-tailed hawk. He owns University Custom Auto Shop and is the disgruntled patriarch of his family: his divorced sister, Precious, and her 20-year-old autistic son, Fred. He's also the unwitting case study of a "life-gone-wrong" for Betty, a young psychology student who works in the auto shop.

Gattling dreams of capturing and training hawks. It is an ancient art that requires precision (you only have a few days to succeed) and extremes (only through practically killing yourself and the bird are you brought together). It is the obsession he shares with Fred. In the quiet pre-dawn tracking of the birds, Gattling feels like a man temporarily freed from the absurdity of civilized life.

After several years of failed attempts, George and his nephew Fred capture the most magnificent bird they have ever seen—the red-tailed hawk. That night, Fred dies in a freak accident, drowning in his water bed. Grief-stricken, George sees his only chance to survive tied together with this bird. He becomes determined to tame her — meaning that he will not eat or sleep, nor will she, until it's all over. At his weakest moment, he locks himself into a battle of wills with the only creature on earth that would rather die than succumb. To the rest of the world, it appears George has gone mad; the closer he gets to achieving success, the crazier his family thinks he's become. Betty is the only one who realizes that George must take himself to the bottom to truly be saved. She watches as George is released into a world where the senses are awakened and emotions are unchecked—a world where one can see and feel the "blood of things".

== Cast ==
- Paul Giamatti as George Gattling
- Michelle Williams as Betty
- Michael Pitt as Fred
- Rusty Schwimmer as Precious
- Robert Wisdom as Billy Bob
- Ann Wedgeworth as Ma Gattling
- John Hostetter as Nebbish Professor
