= Walter Henry Wilson =

Irish ship designer (1839–1904)

Walter Henry Wilson JP FICE FRINA

Personal details
- Born: 4 November 1839 Belfast, Ireland
- Died: 14 May 1904 (aged 64)
- Occupation: Naval architect

Walter Henry Wilson (4 November 1839 – 14 May 1904) was an Irish ship designer and one of the founding partners of the firm Harland and Wolff.

== Early life ==
He was the eldest son and heir of Alexander George Wilson (1797-1856) of Maryville House, Belfast, and Emily Lawrence Boyd. He was a descendant of the Wilsons of Croglin in Dumfriesshire.

Following his education in Belfast, he pursued a career in naval architecture and engineering.

== Career ==
Wilson became a gentleman apprentice in Robert Hickson's shipyard in 1857, which later became Harland and Wolff. In 1861, Wilson completed his apprenticeship and was given a position in the drawing office; he was appointed chief draughtsman in 1863. Wilson became a sub-manager of the shipyard in 1868 and then general manager of the works in 1870. In 1874 Wilson was made a partner of Harland and Wolff (the firm created out of Hickson's shipyard). Wilson served as partner of the firm alongside Sir Edward Harland, William Pirrie, 1st Viscount Pirrie and Gustav Wilhelm Wolff.

During his time with Harland and Wolff, Wilson made many notable contributions to the development of shipbuilding. Wilson's developments are still considered today to have been the most reliable contributions of the time.

Wilson was appointed to the Northern Counties Committee of Midland Railway and became President of the Belfast Chamber of Commerce in 1904 until his sudden death.

== Personal life ==
Wilson lived at Stranmillis House before he bought a 20-year lease of Belvoir Park (which was ended in 1918) from Robert de Yarburgh-Bateson, 3rd Baron Deramore in 1900 and also bought Cranmore House, which was close to his original family property Maryville House.

He married Sarah Elizabeth Wynne in 1875 and had one son and six daughters. His son, Alexander George Wilson (1876-1959), succeeded him in the ownership of his property in Belfast.
