= Margaret Pirrie, Viscountess Pirrie =

Irish public figure and philanthropist

The Right Honourable The Viscountess Pirrie
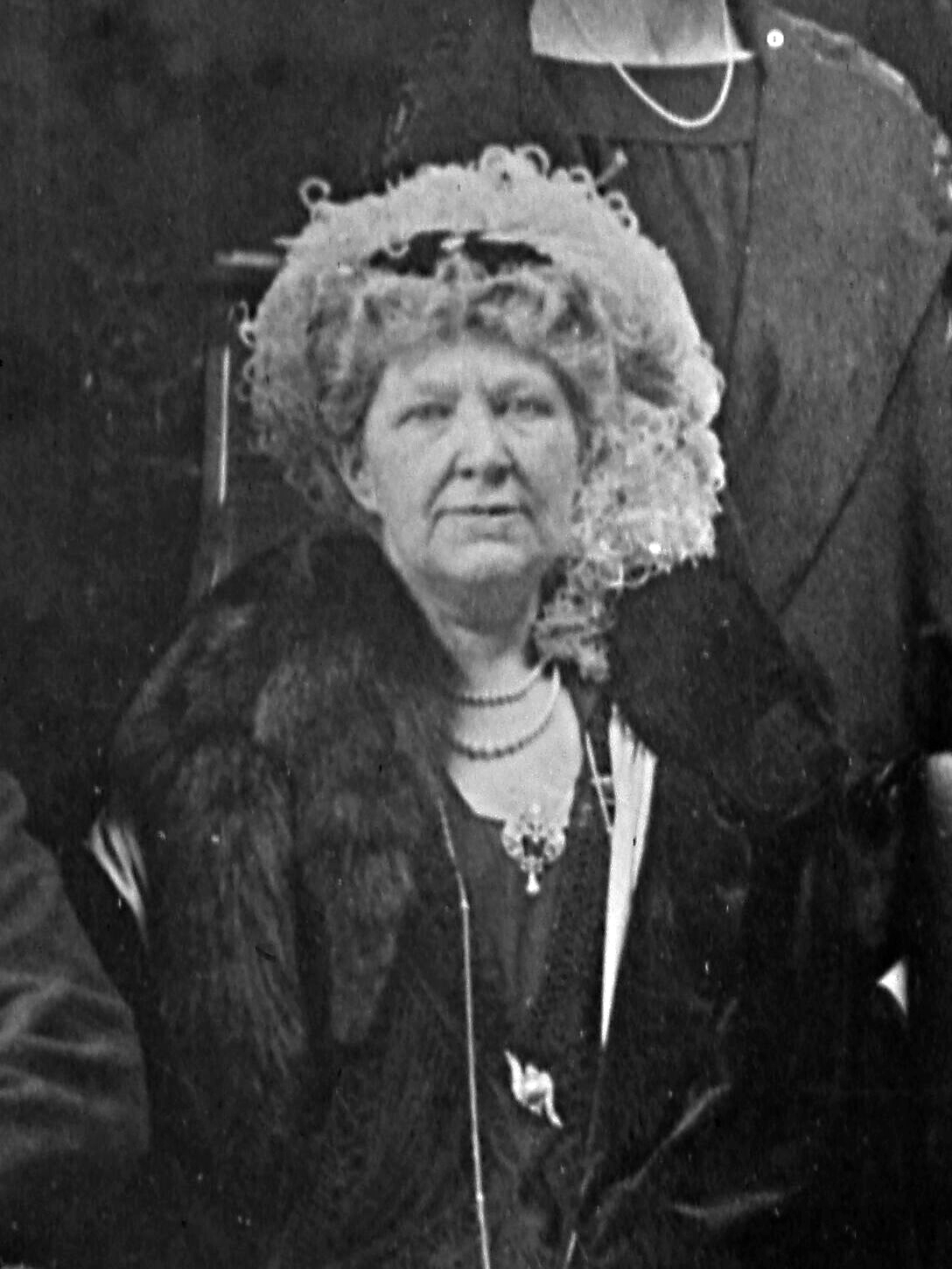
- The Viscountess Pirrie in 1923
- Born: Margaret Montgomery Carlisle; 31 May 1857; Belfast, County Antrim, Ireland, United Kingdom of Great Britain and Ireland
- Died: 19 June 1935 (aged 78); London, United Kingdom
- Spouse: William Pirrie, 1st Viscount Pirrie (m. 1879; died 1924)

Margaret Montgomery Pirrie, Viscountess Pirrie (née Carlisle; 31 May 1857 – 19 June 1935) was an Irish public figure and philanthropist, the first woman Justice of the Peace in Belfast, and the first woman to receive the freedom of the city.

== Early life and family ==
Margaret Montgomery Pirrie was born on 31 May 1857, most likely in Belfast. She was eldest daughter and third child in the family of three sons and two daughters of an English master in the Belfast Academical Institution, John Carlisle, and Catherine (née Montgomery). Her mother's sister was the mother of William James Pirrie. Her brother, Alexander Carlisle, was the general manager of the Harland and Wolff shipyards. Their father educated the children. On 17 April 1879, she married her cousin William James Pirrie, who eventually became chairman of Harland & Wolff from 1895. Pirrie was hugely involved in her husband's business affairs, which was unusual for the time. She would often accompany him on business trips and visited the shipyard often, getting to know the managers and some of the workers. She would work with her husband on engineering designs and financial planning in the evenings, at first from their home in Belfast, Ormiston, and then from their London office.

== Public life ==
Pirrie served as the mayoress of Belfast in 1896 and 1897 when her husband served as lord mayor, described by Frederick Hamilton-Temple-Blackwood, 1st Marquess of Dufferin and Ava as "the most charming and most popular lady mayoress who ever sceptred a city or disciplined a husband". The Pirries' greatest contribution to Belfast city was their fund-raising work for the new Royal Victoria Hospital, which was to replace the old Belfast General Hospital and to celebrate Queen Victoria's diamond jubilee. Under Pirrie's direction the campaign to raise £100,000 to build a 300-bed hospital was reached in under a year. Her husband donated £5,000, and she gave £2,000, and later gave an additional £11,000 to ensure the project was completed debt free. She later campaigned to raise a further £100,000 endowment for the hospital for expansion and running costs. This allowed for the purchase of equipment, resulting in two of the wards being named after the Pirries. She raised an additional £10,000 to name a ward in honour of her doctor, Professor James Cuming. She served as chair on the ladies' committee and the nursing committee. She was recognised as the single most important benefactor of the hospital, serving as the president of the hospital from 1904 until her death. In 1929 and 1931, she donated 1,000 guineas and £1,000 to buy radium for cancer treatment, and would give generous Christmas gifts to patients and staff every year. She would extend these gifts to shipyard employees.

Pirrie became the first woman to be made an honorary burgess of Belfast in 1904 in recognition of her work for the hospital. She was the first woman to serve as a Justice of the peace in Belfast in 1922, and on 25 November 1926 elected an honorary life member of Belfast chamber of commerce. Following the sudden death of her husband on a business trip on 6 June 1924 in the mid-Atlantic, it was discovered that Harland & Wolff's affairs were in disarray. Her husband's personal finances were in a state that the trustees struggled to carry out the provisions of his will. She was appointed president of the company, a position that was created especially for her. Pirrie took an intense dislike to the new managing director, and attempted to undermine his position, even going so far as to appear to challenge his leadership on a number of occasions including a meeting of the works committee she chaired in late 1924 in Belfast. She later accepted the new arrangements, and sold her homes in England, with her Belfast home being taken over by the new managing director.

== Further Information ==
In 1921, Pirrie unveiled War Memorials to Harland and Wolff employees who had lost their lives in World War I, These had been in Greenock, Finnieston, two in Govan and on Friday 25th March in Belfast where she unveiled three brass memorials to the 494 men from the shipyard who had died in the conflict.

== Death and legacy ==
Pirrie died on 19 June 1935 in London, and is buried in Belfast city cemetery. In obituaries she was remembered as a woman of huge influence on "every field of useful endeavour, industry, philanthropy, social service, learning and the arts". There is a bust of Pirrie in the Royal Victoria Hospital, Belfast.

== Portrayals ==
- Eileen O'Brien (2005) - Titanic: Birth of a Legend; TV Documentary
- Eleanor Methven (2012) - Titanic: Blood and Steel; TV series/8 episodes/Episodes 1-2 & 7-12
