= Titanic: Blood and Steel =

2012 12-part television costume drama

- Region 1 DVD cover
- Genre: Historical fiction Historical drama
- Screenplay by: Mark Skeet; Matthew Faulk; Stefano Voltaggio; Alan Whiting; Francesca Brill
- Story by: Mark Skeet; Matthew Faulk; Stefano Voltaggio; Ciaran Donnelly
- Directed by: Ciaran Donnelly
- Starring: Kevin Zegers; Liam Cunningham; Alessandra Mastronardi; Derek Jacobi; Neve Campbell; Chris Noth; Bill Carter; Jonathan Harden; Ophelia Lovibond
- Theme music composer: Maurizio de Angelis
- Countries of origin: France; Italy; Canada; Ireland
- Original language: English
- No. of episodes: 12

Production
- Producer: Guido de Angelis
- Cinematography: James Welland
- Running time: 634 minutes
- Production company: De Angelis Group
- Budget: $30 million

Original release
- Network: History Asia
- Release: May 13 – July 29, 2012

Titanic: Blood and Steel is a 12-part television period drama series about the construction of the RMS Titanic. Produced by History Asia, it is one of two large budget television dramas aired in April 2012, the centenary of the disaster; the other is Titanic.

Titanic: Blood and Steel premiered in Germany and Denmark on April 15, 2012, in Italy on April 22, 2012, and in France in December 2012. Part of the filming took place in Serbia, where the series aired beginning September 9, 2012. In Canada, it began to air on September 19, 2012, on CBC. It was aired in the United States as a six-part mini-series with two episodes back-to-back from October 8, 2012, until October 13, 2012, on Encore.

== Cast ==
- Kevin Zegers as Mark Muir/Marcus Malone
- Alessandra Mastronardi as Sofia Silvestri
- Derek Jacobi as William Pirrie, 1st Viscount Pirrie
- Neve Campbell as Joanna Yaegar
- Ophelia Lovibond as Kitty Carlton / Burlington
- Billy Carter as Thomas Andrews
- Branwell Donaghey as Michael McCann
- Martin McCann as Conor McCann
- Ian McElhinney as Sir Henry Carlton
- Valentina Corti as Violetta Silvestri
- Denise Gough as Emily Hill
- Jonathan Harden as Walter Hill
- Edoardo Leo as Andrea Valle
- Gray O'Brien as J. Bruce Ismay
- Michael McElhatton as Albert Hatton
- Liam Cunningham as James Larkin
- Chris Noth as J. P. Morgan
- Massimo Ghini as Pietro Silvestri
- Paul Herwig as Florian von Altenberg
- Liam Carney as Sean Malone
- Bill Murphy as Bremner
- Eleanor Methven as Margaret Montgomery Pirrie
- Michael Cochrane as Captain Edward Smith
- Barry Barnes as Father Thomas Byles
- Michael Grennell as R. J. McMordie, Mayor of Belfast
- Robert Whitelock as Winston Churchill

== Summary ==
The series follows the lives of the people who made the Titanic, from the workers who built it to its rich financiers. Dr. Mark Muir, an engineer and metallurgist, convinces American tycoon J. P. Morgan to hire him for the biggest shipping project in the world, the construction of the RMS Titanic at Belfast's Harland and Wolff shipyard. Mark is, in truth, a Belfast native born Marcus Malone. Now, with a new name and identity, he tries to hide his heritage from his employers, as he is Catholic and his employers, the Protestant elite that rule Belfast, dislike Catholics.

While working there, Mark falls in love with Sofia Silvestri, an Italian immigrant. However, during the construction of the Titanic, tensions rise between the lower-class workers and the rich elite. More setbacks stall the construction: Harland and Wolff want to save costs and use cheaper materials, the workers wish to form a trade union, the women suffrage movement heats up in the UK, and the pro Home Rule and pro-Unionist groups battle each other. Mark attempts to deal with these while trying to escape his past.

== Deviations from historical fact ==
Below is a selection of some deviations from historical fact:

- The riots and labour unrest in the series are portrayed as safety and wage related; however, they were caused by Harland and Wolff's hiring practices. Harland and Wolff practiced sectarian discrimination and hired predominantly Protestant workers. Catholics rioted against this and the Royal Irish Constabulary were called in. For the period, Harland and Wolff's wages were considered fair, as were the death and injury benefits paid to workers, or to their families, who suffered mishap in their yard. That said, in the plot the sectarian tensions are shown to be a driving force among the various socioeconomic levels and how they relate to each other; including in the fifth episode Lord Pirrie regretfully acknowledging to Dr. Muir that he could have never been employed at White Star at his level if it was known that he was a Catholic, even with a letter of recommendation from J. P. Morgan himself.
- It is also insinuated that Harland and Wolff favored cheaper steel of lower quality to save money, with the implication that cheaper steel played a part in the sinking and loss of life. It has been thoroughly documented, however, that the ship's steel plates were of good quality for the period. Indeed, the RMS Olympic showed great inherent strength prior to the Titanic disaster, and remained in service on the Atlantic until the mid-1930s; Titanic's hull strength is demonstrated by the fact that, even after her bow section plunged 2 1/2 miles to the sea floor, it still remains largely intact. Although her hull broke apart in the final few minutes of the sinking, this was because the strains imposed upon it were simply greater than any ocean liner was designed to bear, and not a symptom of structural weakness.
- American Financier J. P. Morgan is portrayed as overseeing construction of the Titanic, heavily involved in decisions regarding the liner's construction. Although Morgan had acquired the White Star Line in 1902, and had rolled it into his shipping combine, the International Mercantile Marine (or IMM), the White Star Line was run by its managing director, J. Bruce Ismay. Ismay, in turn, became President of the IMM in 1904. It was in fact White Star, not Morgan and IMM, which financed the construction of Olympic, Titanic and Britannic. However the series does correctly show that it was Ismay, not Morgan, who was involved in decisions regarding the ships' design, interior appointments, safety features, etc. His domineering character which is the traditional depiction of his reputation is intact.
- The timeline of events during Titanic's construction and fitting out is significantly distorted in this miniseries. Olympic and Titanic were built side by side on Harland & Wolff Slips Nos. 2 & 3, with Olympic enjoying a lead of several months' progress over her sister. Olympic was launched on October 20, 1910; Titanic was launched on May 31, 1911. On that date, Olympic had just finished her trials, and she began her maiden voyage in June. Olympic's collision with HMS Hawke was September 20, 1911 - well into the time of Titanic's fitting-out. However, in the series, the Olympic had entered service close to the time that Titanic's keel was laid, the collision with the Hawke happened long before Titanic was launched, a significant inaccuracy.
- Titanic did not embark passengers in Belfast. Titanic departed Belfast on April 2, arrived in Southampton 28 hours later, and did not depart Southampton until April 10. With just one exception, the only non-crew members embarked at Belfast were members of the H&W guarantee group and a Board of Trade official.
- In the show, Ismay says that Titanic was 'significantly larger' than the Olympic; in reality, the two ships were of similar size.
- In the series, the term "unsinkable" (or "theoretically unsinkable") is thought of and applied primarily to Titanic by the fictional character Muir after the collision with HMS Hawke, when in reality it was introduced by White Star publicity and period Trade journals such as The Shipbuilder during construction of the two liners, and was applied to both equally. (Coincidentally, the special number of The Shipbuilder in which the term appeared is seen in the series long before Muir supposedly thought of it).
- While the damage to the Olympic by the collision with the Hawke was on her aft-starboard quarter, the damage is shown on her forward-port quarter.
- The worries portrayed among Lord Pirrie, Thomas Andrews and Dr. Muir about the Titanic being just "too big" are a great exaggeration. Although Olympic and Titanic were the two largest ships in the world, at the time, the Hamburg-Amerika Line was beginning work on a trio of even larger superliners, and the Cunard Line was planning to build a similarly-sized liner that would be the larger, slower sister to Mauretania and Lusitania.

== Episode list ==
| No. | Title | Written by | Original airdate on History Channel Asia |
|---|---|---|---|
| 1 | "A City Divided" | Unknown | May 13, 2012 |
In 1909, Dr. Mark Muir, a young metallurgist living in New York City, persuades American tycoon J.P. Morgan to hire him for the biggest shipping construction project the world has ever seen: RMS Titanic, at the Harland & Wolff shipyard, in Belfast, Ireland. Muir received his doctorate at Imperial College in London, and previously had been chief metallurgist on HMS Dreadnought. The shipyard's visionary Chairman Lord Pirrie takes the young scientist under his wing, introducing him to Belfast's Protestant elite. Mark quickly catches the eye of the charming, albeit spoiled, daughter of a magnate: Kitty Carlton. But he is also intrigued by a very different woman: Sofia Silvestri, an Italian immigrant's daughter. Belfast, seen through Mark's eyes, is a city ridden with divisions of class and religion, from which, as a stranger, Mark should be far removed. But we soon discover that Mark is a man with a past mysteriously connected to the Catholic suburbs of Belfast.
| 2 | "Stained Steel" | Unknown | May 20, 2012 |
During Mark's first week on the job at working at Harland & Wolff, he starts finding out things about the steel used that lead him into conflict with chief designer Thomas Andrews. In the meantime, social tension escalates. A prominent figure in the labour movement, Jim Larkin, is organizing the workers in Belfast to form a union. At a carnival, Kitty Carlton seduces Mark with her elegant charms. Sofia gets more involved in her fight for freedom, which she interprets in a personal way, turning down her father's apprentice, Andrea Valle, much to her father's grief. At the end, Mark's secret is revealed: he was born as Marcus Malone (he changed his name to Mark Muir after he arrived in New York), and he is the only son and child of Sean Malone, a Belfast Catholic dockworker. Sean is an old drunkard, mentally and physically broken by a life of unimaginable harshness of working at the shipyards. His only remaining pride lies in Mark whom father and son share an awkward but warm reunion after not seeing each other in years. Now, Sean is worried that if Mark's identity were to be disclosed, he would lose his job at the Protestant-managed shipyard since Mark is Catholic. But Mark is careful and guarded and tells his father that he has everything under control.
| 3 | "Good Man Down" | Unknown | May 27, 2012 |
Mark has put his father up in a small hotel until he finds better living quarters for him and even gives Sean some money out of his own pocket. But Sean spends all the money that Mark gives him on hard liquor and confines himself to his room doing nothing but drinking all day and night. However, another man is looking for Mark, someone that Sean fears. Mark's job has made him closer to Sofia Silvestri. Sofia is charmed by Mark: he seems genuinely interested in her. Sofia's friend, Emily, warns her to be careful being around Mark. But Sofia has other worries. Her father is encouraging Andrea to fight for her. But Sofia won't be forced. Meanwhile, Mark discovers a problem with the steel used to build the ship. But science is put to test by the divides in Belfast. The Protestant magnates, worried by the success of the Union, call in the Royal Army to boycott a peaceful march that Larkin organizes. The Army sabotages the march in the Catholic area, causing accidents that seem organised by Catholic workers. Mark is there to show his respect for the workers. Sofia is there with Emily and the McCann's younger brother, Conor, whom has bitter resentment against the British army since being discharged months earlier. To everybody's shock, innocent school teacher Walter Hill, Emily's husband, is killed by a soldier. Mark only just manages to rescue Sofia from the havoc. Andrea Valle is also wounded during the riot.
| 4 | "Danger Looms" | Unknown | June 3, 2012 |
Walter's death has changed the whole picture. Malcontent breeds amongst workers, especially at the shipyard. Larkin has been forced to leave the city. Andrea, to Sofia's embarrassment, is staying at her house. Emily returns to work, but cannot emotionally function leading to her job being at risk. Lord Pirrie is shocked by the unrest and fights with his former friend Henry Carlton – Kitty's father – whom he holds responsible. He seeks an understanding with Michael McCann, one of the leaders of the workers' movement. They are both intelligent and moral men and Lord Pirrie offers to work with Michael any way he can to help the workers. Andrea recovers from his head wound during the riot at the Silvestri household with Sofia attending to him, in which his continuing boyish love to her turns into obsession and anger as she still will not accept his love to her. Meanwhile, Mark keeps his mind on his job and finally identifies the problem with the steel: impurities. But the steel complies with regulations. Eventually Thomas Andrews will see his point, and a new relationship will form. But work is not Mark's only occupation: he finally kisses Sofia. Mark also rejects Kitty when she tries to come onto him again. At the end, when Mark goes to the hotel to visit his father, he is assaulted by Bernard Doyle who accuses Mark of having abandoned his fiancée, Bernard's daughter Siobhan, who died in childbirth years ago.
| 5 | "Under Lock and Key" | Unknown | June 10, 2012 |
Mark's story is fully revealed. When he lived in Belfast, he had a girlfriend, named Siobhan Doyle. She was supposed to follow him to America but never did. Siobhan died soon after. Mark's father told him she had died of TB. Instead, she had died at childbirth without him ever knowing. Mark realises how much Siobhan suffered, and is heartbroken. She was sent to a convent. Mark confronts Sean, who insists that he lied because he didn't want his son giving up his own new life in America, and he insists Siobhan didn't want that either, so she did not contact him. Mark angrily turns his back on his father, and visits the convent where Siobhan is buried. To his utter shock, he finds out that the child, a baby girl, survived and was handed over to the church for adoption. He tries to find her, but the nuns will not tell him anything. An accident occurs that forces him back to work: RMS Olympic, a ship in the same class as Titanic, has had a serious accident. Mark is asked to study the implications. Mark's new discoveries are now less important that delivering on schedule. Meanwhile, Pirrie and Andrews discover Mark's true identity and that he is Catholic, but sympathetic to him, they guard his secret.
| 6 | "The Imposter" | Unknown | June 17, 2012 |
The RMS Olympic accident has created a terrible workload. Tensions between the Protestant and Catholic classes escalate. Lord Pirrie and Michael finally manage to come to an understanding that appease the workers, but not magnate Charles Stokes. Unfortunately, Conor McCann, Emily's younger brother, is driven towards more extremist acts after he gets fired. The Fenian movement, a Catholic terrorist group, takes Conor in. Meanwhile, Mark suggests building a double hull for the Titanic, but Pirrie is unimpressed. It would mean wasting too much time and money. To try and forget his many concerns, Mark manages to take Sofia away for a romantic weekend in the countryside. It is a time when love flourishes, giving both of them the illusion that everything will be fine. Meanwhile, Henry Carlton has discovered Mark's real identity. He is also furious when he finds out his daughter, Kitty, has been in a relationship with a Catholic impostor. Kitty is disowned and she decides to leave Belfast. As soon as Mark comes back, he is summoned to the office by the board and fired.
| 7 | "The Truth Shall Set You Free" | Unknown | June 24, 2012 |
Losing his job is not Mark's only problem. Sofia knows his truth. Mark tells her everything, even about Siobhan and the baby. She eventually forgives him. It is also time for Mark to reconcile with his father, Sean. Mark's situation seems to get better still when J.P. Morgan arrives from New York. When told the reason why his chief metallurgist has been fired, Morgan has him immediately reinstated. Mark starts looking for a viable alternative to the double hull, an alternative he finds in higher bulkheads. Meanwhile, General Elections are in sight. Home Rule for Ireland is at stake. The possibility of London putting a stop to controlling the island is strongly opposed by the Protestant minority, which fears the power the Catholic majority would get should Ireland become an independent republic. Emily persuades her brother, Michael, to stand for Parliament, and Pirrie helps and supports his main counterpart in the shipyard. Also, Conor makes an arms deal with a German mercenary for arms, but the arrival of a British platoon forces Conor and his group to flee their rural hideout. Elsewhere, Sofia wants to take her romantic relationship with Mark public. Mark knows that this would mean new tensions that could ostracize him. Above all, Mark is trying to protect Sofia. She would be fired immediately. But Sofia is independent minded. She is tired of Belfast. She goes back to studying, trying to create a better future for herself. A sad coldness slowly builds between them and, quite unexpectedly, Mark gets news of his daughter.
| 8 | "High Stakes" | Unknown | July 1, 2012 |
The high-staked General Elections are drawing closer. The magnates have their own candidate, the Unionist extremist Albert Hatton. The fact that Pirrie does not support Hatton makes him an enemy of the Protestant ruling class. Michael is campaigning for Labour. His sister Emily helps him. But she gets arrested for giving out leaflets. This is a political measure, and Emily is only the scapegoat. On the ship front, Mark's proposition to erect higher bulkheads to defend Titanic is crushed by Bruce Ismay, the Chairman of White Star Line, the company Titanic is being built for. When the elections occur, Albert Hatton wins a handsome majority. The third candidate, Michael, only gets a very small number of votes. Protestant and anti-Home Rule extremists fume with rage and hatred, and Michael is assaulted, cruelly beaten and forced to leave Belfast. His brother, Conor, has become a terrorist and has taken lives when he chooses to kill a collaborator. Even more disgusted with the ways of Belfast, Sofia now wants to leave and go to London. She asks Mark to go with her. But Mark is forced to make a choice between being with Sofia or searching for his daughter. He chooses to stay in Belfast to continue looking for his daughter.
| 9 | "Burden of Proof" | Unknown | July 8, 2012 |
The Admiralty has opened an inquiry into the Olympic accident, and Pirrie, Andrews, Morgan and Mark are invited to London. Mark is pleased to see his old friend Kitty, who has become a star silent screen actress. At the inquiry, the First Lord of the Admiralty, Winston Churchill, suggests that the yard could serve several ends in case of military escalation. Joanna Yaeger, an American journalist who is Mark's old friend and Morgan's protégée, is soon forced into a very dangerous position: that of being a spy. With Joanna's unparalleled access, she can prove to be extremely useful to the Austro-Hungarian and German causes. Back in Belfast, Mark faces a new crisis. Andrea, Sofia's old fiancé, has seen her with him and has told Pietro. Sofia is forced to choose. Sofia chooses Mark. Finally he agrees to follow Sofia: they will move to London, together. He will leave Harland & Wolff and all hopes to ever find his own daughter. At the end in a breathtaking ceremony, the Titanic is finally launched.
| 10 | "A Crack in the Armor" | Unknown | July 15, 2012 |
Titanic's sister ship, the Olympic, is damaged again. Mark can't leave Belfast for the time being. Sofia also has to postpone her plans. Pietro has been injured at work and she must look after him. Mark and Andrews look for new solutions. The gashes in Olympic suggest that the steel is just too weak. Eventually they have to concede that the steel, combined with the sheer scope, is just not good enough. The double hull would have protected the ship - perhaps the bulkheads too. For this to become a serious problem, Titanic would have to crash into something very solid - an occurrence that seems remote on the Atlantic Ocean. While Mark and Andrews slowly come to their conclusions, Emily is sentenced to an astoundingly unfair six months in jail. But another terrible event occurs: Conor is shot dead while the Unionists start advocating a new, separate state: Ulster (Northern Ireland).
| 11 | "The Tipping Point" | Unknown | July 22, 2012 |
An accountant from the United States, named Samuel, arrives and makes Mark feel jealous. Samuel is handsome and witty. He is American and unaware and uninterested in divisions. For Sofia, he represents a real temptation: Pietro is better and Mark still can't leave his job. Mark is still uncertain: he still hopes to find his daughter. Mark discovers what the girl's name was: Sarah. The girl might live in a small village outside Belfast. But the girl, who had indeed been living there, has left. They have moved to Belfast, but no one knows where. Meanwhile, Emily is released from prison after serving her time and wants to go back into fighting for the Catholic cause in Ireland. Meanwhile, Joanna continues her double-agent status when she is asked to steal important documents out of Pierre's office safe for her German contact. Elsewhere, Andrews fights, and loses, a memorable battle to equip Titanic with more life boats. While Pirrie and Churchill try to campaign for Home Rule in Belfast, the divide between the Catholic and Protestant communities has grown. Lord Pirrie, by now disillusioned with most of his liberal principles, falls ill.
| 12 | "The ‘Unsinkable’ Sets Sail" | Unknown | July 29, 2012 |
April 2, 1912. The time has come for the great ship to leave for the New World. In New York City, as J.P. Morgan always wanted, the Titanic's maiden voyage will become one of the first great PR events for his firm as he decides to promote a gala to celebrate the ship's first voyage upon arrival. Back in Belfast, Sofia and Joanna Yaeger become friends, and she gets Sofia a job as an illustrator for The New York Times. Pietro uses most of his money to buy Sofia a ticket for the Titanic. Mark himself only gets on board by chance when Thomas Andrews asks him to be a part of the ship's guarantee group. The group also includes Jack Lowry, a young riveter we met at the beginning of the story. Violetta goes with the baby, whom Michael McCann has come back to marry and they board together. Emily decides not to go to America, but to remain in Belfast to continue her activist work. Sean also decides against traveling to America because he considers Belfast his only world and he would not feel at home anywhere else. Thomas Andrews will come on board as well as White Star Chairman Bruce Ismay. Lord Pirrie, still recovering from his bout of influenza, decides not to partake in the voyage. Joanna will be on-board to take her stolen documents to New York to another German contact. Kitty will also be on board, who is now an acclaimed stage and screen actress. A little girl by the name of Sarah (Mark's daughter), with her adopted mother, board Third Class. Neither Mark nor his daughter are aware of each other's presence on board the Titanic. Andrea also happens to be on board, courtesy of his friend Giacomo; they are both working their way to America as two of the Titanic's stokers. And, while the ship sails for New York, Mark and Sofia finally find happiness and reconciliation as they meet on the ship. At the very conclusion, as Sean watches the Titanic sail away with his son on board, the audience is left asking: who amongst these characters will survive the impending great disaster?

== Nielsen Ratings ==
In the United States, Titanic: Blood and Steel aired on Encore, which does not publish Nielsen Ratings on a frequent basis. Due to the lack of published reports, only ratings for certain episodes are available.

| Episode | Rating (18–49) | Viewers (millions) |
|---|---|---|
| 7 | 0.0 | 0.231 |
| 8 | 0.0 | 0.229 |
| 11 | 0.1 | 0.195 |
| 12 | 0.1 | 0.253 |

== Home media release ==
Lions Gate Entertainment has released the 12-part miniseries on DVD and Blu-ray Disc on December 4, 2012.
