= Alexander Carlisle =

British shipbuilder (1854–1926)

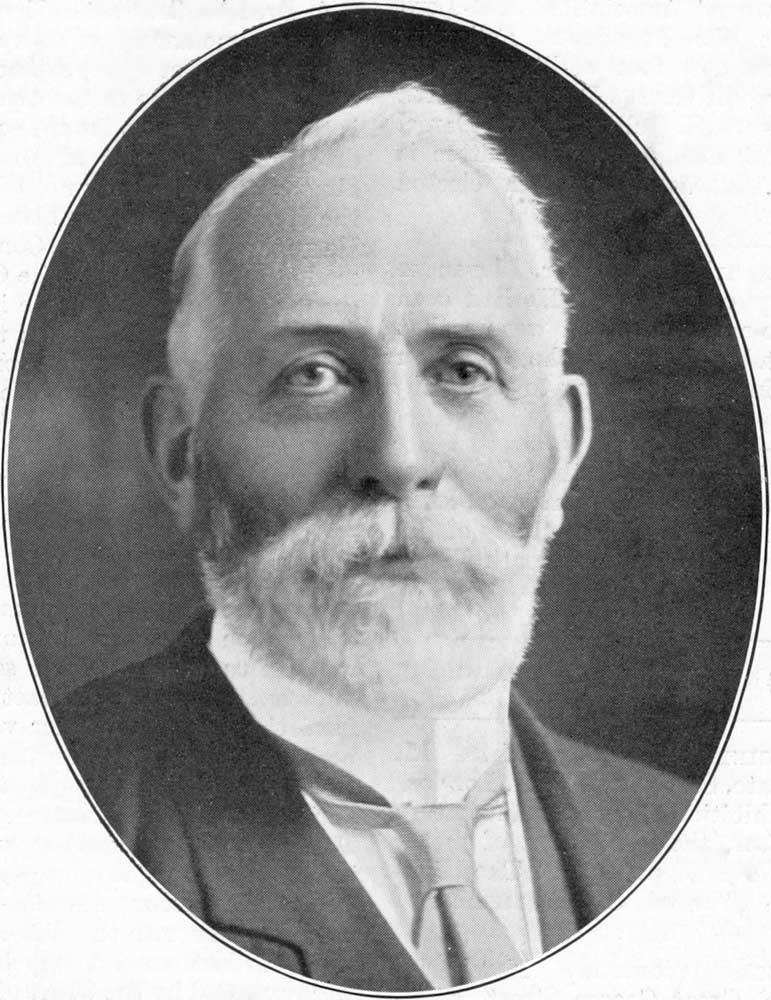
Alexander Carlisle

Alexander Montgomery Carlisle PC (Ire) (8 July 1854 – 6 March 1926) was a British shipbuilder who was general manager of the shipbuilding company Harland and Wolff.

brother-in-law to Viscount Pirrie, was one of the men involved with designing the Olympic-class ocean liners in As a Privy Councillor of Ireland, he was known as "The Right Honorable".

== Biography ==
Carlisle was born in Ballymena, the eldest son of John Carlisle, director of the Royal Belfast Academical Institution. He studied at his father's school until he left at 16 to join the shipyard Harland & Wolff, starting out as an apprentice. It was during this period that he met Pirrie, who would later marry his sister Margaret in 1879.

In 1884 he married Edith Wooster, an American woman from San Francisco; the marriage produced a son and two daughters.

Carlisle was one of the men who designed the three ships of the Olympic class: the Olympic, Titanic, and Britannic. In the design of the Olympic and Titanic, he was responsible for the decor, the equipment and general arrangements, as well as the implementation of the davits system for the lifeboats. After 40 years at Harland & Wolff, Carlisle retired in 1910, becoming a shareholder in the Welin Davit & Engineering Company Ltd, the company that made the davits.

While working on the liners, Carlisle had some minor disputes with Lord Pirrie over the number of lifeboats required for a vessel of this size. Pirrie, the chairman of Harland & Wolff, was satisfied that the number of lifeboats supplied more than met the board of trade regulations. Carlisle then retired and did not have anything more to do with shipbuilding. Thomas Andrews, Pirrie's nephew, was then made master shipbuilder. Contemporary documentaries claimed Carlisle retired in anger due to Pirrie not accepting his lifeboat recommendations, but Carlisle's statements suggest the retirement was already planned. The Olympic-class liners were the last ships that Carlisle was involved with.

Carlisle was appointed to the Privy Council of Ireland in 1907 by King Edward VII, serving in the House of Lords with Pirrie. Ultimately, he was expelled in 1920 during an intense debate over home-rule in Ireland.

== Portrayals ==
- Charles Lawson (2005) - Titanic: Birth of a Legend; TV Documentary
- Shaughan Seymour (2008) - The Unsinkable Titanic; TV Documentary

== See also ==
- Thomas Andrews
