= Thomas Andrews =

British businessman and shipbuilder (1873–1912)

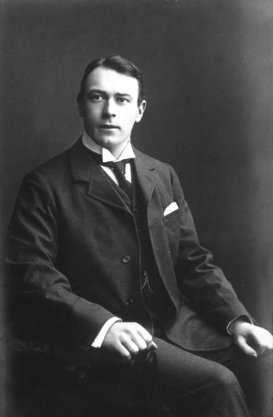
- Andrews in 1911
- Born: 7 February 1873; Comber, County Down, Ireland
- Died: 15 April 1912 (aged 39); North Atlantic Ocean
- Occupations: Businessman; shipbuilder
- Title: Managing director of Harland and Wolff
- Spouse: Helen Reilly Barbour (m. 1908)
- Children: 1
- Relatives: William Pirrie, 1st Viscount Pirrie (uncle); J. M. Andrews (brother); Sir James Andrews, 1st Baronet (brother)

Thomas Andrews Jr. (7 February 1873 – 15 April 1912) was a British businessman and shipbuilder, who was managing director and head of the drafting department of the shipbuilding company Harland and Wolff in Belfast, Ireland.

Andrews was one of the architects in charge of the plans for the Olympic-class ocean liners, most notably the RMS Titanic. He perished along with more than 1,500 people when the ship sank on her maiden voyage.

== Early life ==
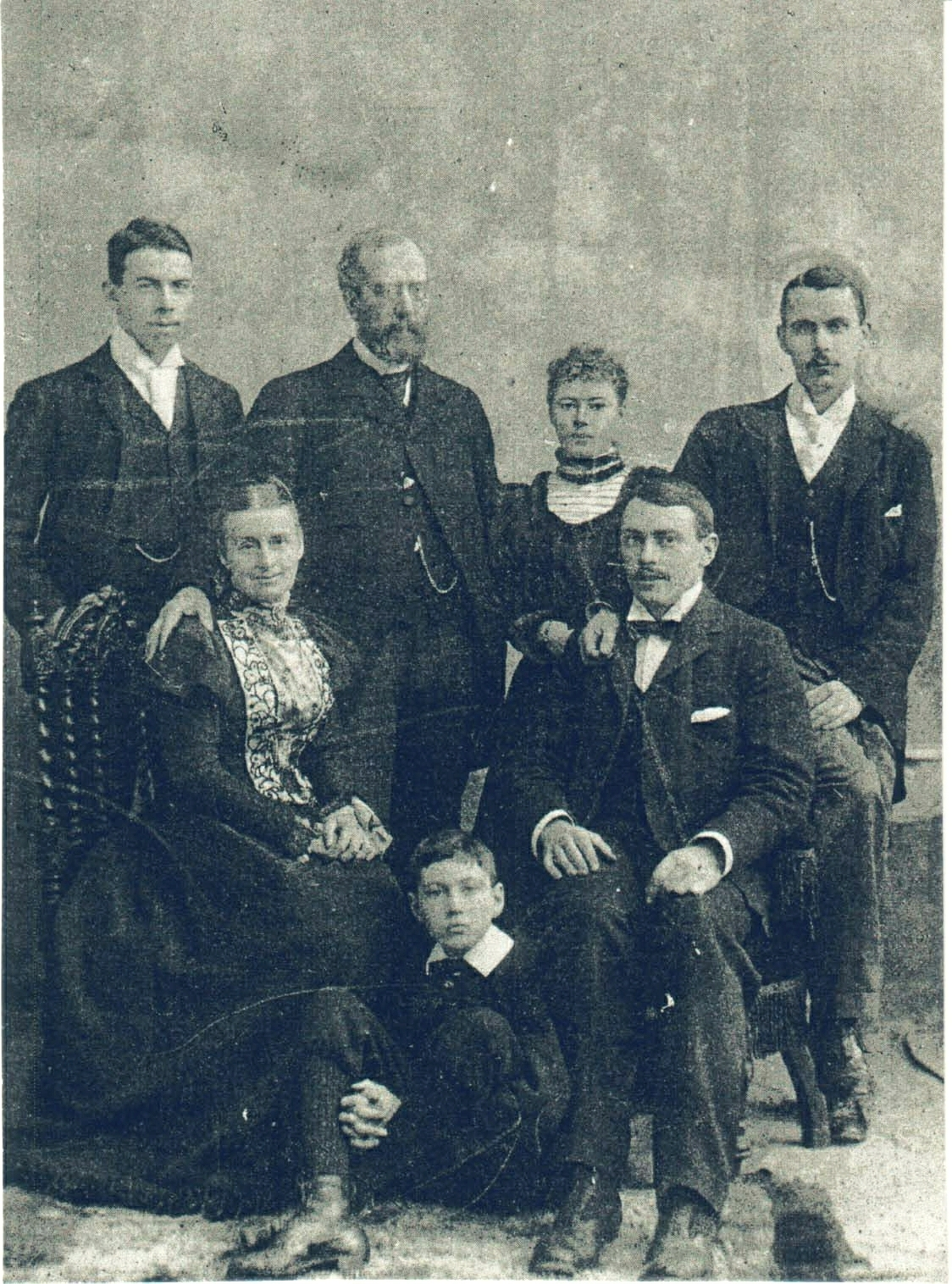
Thomas (second from right) with family, c. 1895

Thomas Andrews Jr. was born on 7 February 1873 at Ardara House, Comber, County Down, in Ireland, to The Rt. Hon. Thomas Andrews, a member of the Privy Council of Ireland, and Eliza Pirrie. Andrews was a Presbyterian of Scottish descent and considered himself British. His siblings included J. M. Andrews, the future Prime Minister of Northern Ireland, and Sir James Andrews, the future Lord Chief Justice of Northern Ireland. Thomas Andrews lived with his family in Ardara, Comber. In 1884, he began attending the Royal Belfast Academical Institution until 1889 when, at the age of sixteen, he began a premium apprenticeship at Harland and Wolff where his uncle, the Viscount Pirrie, was part owner. Andrews' sharp wit and penchant for hard work had brought him prominence within his uncle's company.

== Harland and Wolff ==
At Harland and Wolff, Andrews began with three months in the joiners' shop, followed by a month in the cabinetmakers' and then a further two months working on the ships. The last eighteen months of his five-year apprenticeship were spent in the drawing office. Andrews worked tirelessly during the day and continued his studies in the evening hours. In 1901, boarding at 11 Wellington Place, after working in the many departments of the company, he was deeply involved in the construction of White Star's ocean liners and was serving as Assistant Shipyard Manager and was later appointed Manager of the Construction Works. That same year, he also became a member of the Institution of Naval Architects. By 1907, he had been appointed the managing director of Harland and Wolff and began to oversee the plans for the new Olympic-class ocean liners for the White Star Line. All three ships of the class were designed by Andrews, William Pirrie and general manager Alexander Carlisle to be the largest, safest and most luxurious ships at sea. He was intimately connected with the design of Olympic and Titanic. By that point, Andrews had earned a reputation as a genius in the field of ship design. Andrews usually referred to his position as that of a "shipbuilder" or a "director" of the shipbuilding firm he worked at, rather than claiming the more formal title of "Naval Architect".

During his long years of apprenticeship, study, and work, Andrews had become well-loved in the company and amongst the shipyard's employees. Andrews was a tireless worker; he frequently showed up at the shipyard at any time. He was always willing to pitch in and lend a hand at some physically demanding work task as the need arose. He was known to have shared his lunch with fellow workers when the need came up. Even so, Andrews was not afraid to correct workers when he saw them doing something the wrong way or breaking shipyard rules. It was said that while he wouldn't fire a worker when he found him in the middle of some such nonsense, he would give the worker "the rough side of his tongue and a friendly caution." He also enjoyed it when workers did more than just mindlessly plug away at their tasks - he encouraged them to put their minds into it. Andrews was willing to listen to input from workers who thought they had a better way to do something. Well-documented sources seemed to describe him as cheery, optimistic, and generous. One yard foreman recalled that it "seemed his delight to make those around him happy. His was ever the friendly greeting and the warm handshake and kind disposition" and one co-worker described him as "diligent to the point of strenuousness".

== Family ==
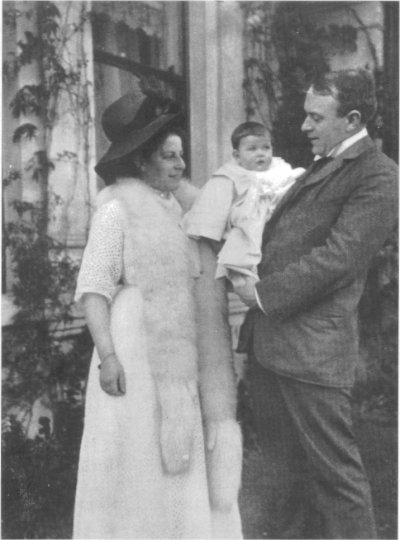
Andrews with wife, Helen Barbour, and daughter, Elizabeth Law Barbour Andrews

On 24 June 1908, Andrews married Helen Reilly Barbour, daughter of textile industrialist John Doherty Barbour and sister to the politician Sir John Milne Barbour, known as "Milne". The couple honeymooned in Switzerland and lived at Dunallan, 12 Windsor Avenue, Belfast, now numbered 20, and worshipped at First Presbyterian Church on Rosemary Street. Their daughter, Elizabeth Law Barbour Andrews (known by her initials, "ELBA"), was born on 27 November 1910. It is known that Andrews took Helen to view the Titanic one night, shortly before Elizabeth was born.

He was always willing to acknowledge the hard work of other people, and his wife recalled that he had of himself "the humblest opinion of anyone I ever knew." During the maiden voyage of RMS Olympic, Andrews and J. Bruce Ismay made selected notes on what could be improved upon Titanic. Andrews suffered from varicose veins in his legs. According to stewardess Violet Jessop, during the voyage of RMS Olympic, some crew members presented him with a very handsome walking stick; the crew were grateful for his ongoing efforts in making their accommodations more comfortable. She even felt that, in some way, Andrews managed to impart some of his positive personality into the ships he had designed and helped build.

== RMS Titanic ==
=== Departure ===
Andrews also headed a group of Harland and Wolff workers called the guarantee group, who went on the maiden voyages of their ships in order to observe ship operations and spot any necessary improvements. Titanic was no exception, so Andrews and the rest of his Harland and Wolff group travelled from Belfast on Titanic for her sea trials on 2 April 1912. He had been assigned to head the builder's delegation during the trials. He was accompanied by Edward Wilding and yard employees. He was booked in First Class and would occupy cabin A-36. At the time of the departure from Belfast, Andrews' father was ill and his wife Helen had not been well, either. Andrews wrote a quick line to his wife: "Just a line to let you know that we got away this morning in fine style and have had a very satisfactory trial. We are getting more ship-shape every hour, but there is still a great deal to be done."

According to Edward Wilding, when the ship made its way to Southampton, Andrews was "ceaselessly employed going round with representatives of the owners and of the Firm, in taking notes and preparing reports of work still to be done." Andrews did find time to eat, as Saloon Steward Frederick Ray, who had served him previously on RMS Olympic, was assigned to wait on Andrews' table during the trip down to Southampton. At Southampton, Andrews was up early on April 4, left the South Western Hotel where he was staying, and spent the day "with managers and foremen putting work in hand". Andrews and others coordinated in order to help finish the ship by Tuesday night. On Thursday evening, he wrote to his wife, "I wired you this morning of our safe arrival after a very satisfactory trip. The weather was good and everyone most pleasant. I think the ship will clean up all right before sailing on Wednesday."

Andrews went on to mention that Lord Pirrie's doctors had refused to allow him to make the maiden voyage. From that point on, Andrews was constantly busy. Andrews' secretary, Thompson Hamilton, wrote of Andrews' activities at Southampton, that he "was never for a moment idle. He generally left his hotel about 8:30 for the offices, where he dealt with his correspondence, then went on board until 6:30, where he would return to the offices to sign letters. During the day I took to the ship any urgent papers and he always dealt with them no matter what his business. He would himself put in their place such things as racks, tables, chairs, berth ladders, electric fans, saying that except he saw everything right he could not be satisfied." On April 9, Andrews wrote to his wife, "The Titanic is now about complete and will I think do the old Firm credit to-morrow when we sail."

=== Voyage ===
On 10 April, Andrews boarded the ship, having left his room at the South Western Hotel. Immediately upon boarding, he began a thorough inspection. He was pleased with what he found, it was said. Titanic began her maiden voyage from Southampton. Before departure, Andrews took the opportunity to say goodbye to Thomas Hamilton and others who were not accompanying the ship on the voyage. His spirits were high and he said, "Remember now and keep Mrs Andrews informed of any news of the vessel". When the ship nearly collided with the liner SS City of New York, Andrews thought that the situation was "decidedly unpleasant".

A few hours later, the Titanic called at Cherbourg Harbour in north-western France, and Andrews wrote to his wife, "We reached here in nice time and took on board quite a number of passengers...the weather is fine and everything shaping for a good voyage." After departing Queenstown (now Cobh) in Ireland, Andrews, at a dining table, mentioned that in certain ways, the ship was not ready to sail but they had to proceed because the prescheduled sailing date of April 10 arrived and the ship simply had to sail on time. On April 11, Third Class Steward John E. Hart recalled that at some point during the day, there was a general bulkhead inspection. He saw Andrews and Chief Officer Henry Tingle Wilde checking to make sure that the crew would close the watertight doors manually. Andrews' bedroom steward, Henry Etches, noticed that Andrews "was working all the time" taking notes on various improvements he felt were needed, primarily cosmetic changes to various facilities. Jessop said that Andrews "never failed to stop for a cheerful word, his only regret that we were "getting further from home"."

On the night of April 12, stewardess Mary Sloan conversed with Andrews in the Grand Staircase and noted Dr William Francis Norman O'Loughlin note Andrews seemed "loth to go, he wanted to talk about home; he was telling me his father was ill and Mrs Andrews was not so well...he said...he did not like (that the ship) was taking us further away from home...his face struck me as having a very sad expression". However, on the night of 14 April, Sloan felt Andrews was in "good spirits". Eleanor Cassebeer put on a stunning gown and arrived at the Purser's table, which she shared with Dr O'Loughlin and Andrews, a chipper Andrews let out a friendly little cheer for her choice, then he leaned over to her and said, "Now that's the way a lady should look!" Albert Dick and his wife Vera had grown attached to Andrews and noticed that "upon every occasion, and especially at dinner on Sunday evening, he talked almost constantly about his wife, little girl, mother and family, as well as of his home". After dinner, Andrews made his way aft "to thank the baker for some special bread he had made for him" and returned to his stateroom to make calculations and drawings for future use. Andrews reportedly remarked to a friend that Titanic was "as nearly perfect as human brains can make her."

=== Collision ===
At 11:40 PM, Titanic struck an iceberg on the ship's starboard side. Eleanor Cassebeer may have been the first witness to see Andrews after the collision and said that he "assured everybody that we were absolutely safe, and that the Titanic was absolutely unsinkable. He said that she could break in three separate and distinct parts and that each part would stay afloat indefinitely"; Andrews may have felt the collision and immediately gone out on deck to investigate for himself, moving forward along A Deck. He may have seen the iceberg as it faded into the distance astern. Albert and Vera Dick saw Andrews who said "that he was going below to investigate...he knew the ship as no one else did and that he might be able to allay the fear of the passengers".

Saloon Steward James Johnstone saw Andrews race down to E Deck, seemingly heading towards the Engine Room, to help examine the damage; he reassured some First Class Ladies. Johnstone saw Andrews come back up to D Deck and head towards the mail room. Stewardess Annie Robinson saw him on E Deck, heading towards the Mail Room with a mail clerk and Chief Purser Hugh McElroy. She saw Andrews come back with Captain Edward J. Smith and overheard Andrews saying, "Well, three have gone already, Captain"; Smith and Andrews separated, with Smith heading up to the bridge, while Andrews stayed below to continue his inspection.

Andrews determined that the first five of the ship's sixteen watertight compartments were rapidly flooding, more than the four that the vessel was supposed to withstand. He was seen by First Class passenger Anna Warren rushing up the Grand Staircase on D Deck, taking the steps three at a time, with a "look of terror" on his face. Passenger William Sloper saw Andrews rushing up the staircase on A Deck, hurrying towards the bridge, "worried". Albert and Vera Dick were told by Andrews, "There is no cause for any excitement. All of you get what you can in the way of clothes and come on deck as soon as you can. She is torn to bits below, but she will not sink if her after bulkheads hold". Andrews may have relayed the information to Captain Smith on the bridge, adding that in his opinion, the vessel had only about an hour and a half before foundering. He and Smith had to have realised the severe shortage of lifeboats on board the ship.

=== Evacuation ===
As the evacuation began, Andrews appears to have gone below deck in order to help prepare passengers for evacuation. He may have told George Rheims and his brother-in-law Joseph Loring to put their lifebelts on, and continued down onto A Deck, where he helped crewmembers who were trying to get passengers roused, dressed and up on deck with their lifebelts on. He came upon Stewardess Annie Robinson and told her, "Put on your lifebelt and walk about and let the passengers see you." When she protested, "It looks rather mean." Andrews firmly replied, "No, put it on", and added, "Well, if you value your life put your belt on." Mary Sloan said that he was "here, there and everywhere, looking after everybody, telling the women to put on lifebelts, telling the stewardesses to hurry the women up to the boats, all about everywhere, thinking of everyone but himself."

Etches bumped into Andrews who asked if he had awakened all of his passengers. Andrews told Etches to follow him down the Pantry stairs to C Deck, and began to instruct Etches to "be sure and make the passengers open their doors, and to tell them the lifebelts were on top of the wardrobes and on top of the racks", as well as to assist them in every way that the steward could, which Etches endeavoured to follow through on. Before parting, Andrews said that Etches should make sure no lifebelts were left in the cabins. Etches re-joined Andrews on C Deck, and proceeded to the first class entrance and forward grand staircase. When Chief Purser McElroy told them he wanted passengers to put lifebelts on, Andrews said, "That is exactly what I have been trying to get them to do"; he left to go down the stairs to D Deck.

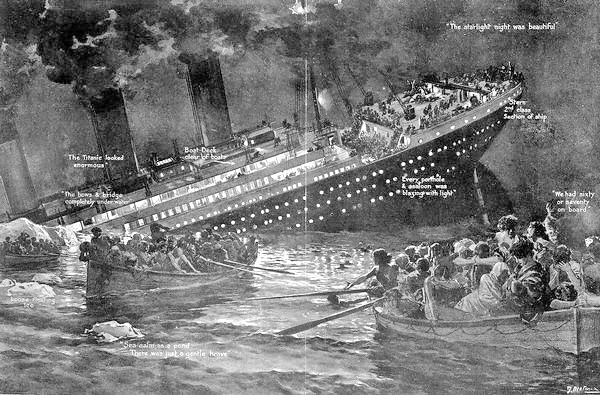
Illustration of the sinking of the Titanic

Andrews and Ismay were present at the launch of Boat No.7, and they moved on to help at boat No.5. Fully aware of the short time the ship had left and of the lack of lifeboat space for all passengers and crew, he urged people into the lifeboats in the hope of filling them with as many people as possible. He motioned Eleanor Cassebeer into Boat No.5; when asked why he did not get in, he replied, "No, women and children first". John and John "Jack" Borland Thayer III ran into Andrews; the father asked Andrews what the situation was; Andrews replied quietly that he did not give the ship "much over an hour to live". Titanic sank at 2:20 a.m, on April 15. Andrews perished along with more than 1,500 others; his body was never recovered.

=== Death ===
Andrews was reportedly last seen by an assistant steward, named by some sources as steward John Stewart, after approximately 2:05 am; Andrews was standing alone in the first-class smoking room, his arms folded and lifebelt lying on a nearby table. The steward asked Andrews, "Aren't you going to have a try for it, Mr. Andrews?" Andrews did not answer or move, "just stood like one stunned". In his 1955 book A Night to Remember, Walter Lord reported that Andrews was staring at the Norman Wilkinson painting Plymouth Harbour that hung over the fireplace and depicted the entrance to Plymouth Sound, which Titanic had been expected to visit on her return voyage. (Note: This painting is often incorrectly portrayed on television and in movies about the sinking of the Titanic as another Wilkinson painting, Approach to the New World, which portrayed the entrance to New York Harbor. This was an error made by Walter Lord in his research, and has been repeated by several authors; that painting was in fact hung in the first-class smoking room of Olympic) The sighting of Andrews in the smoking room became one of the most famous stories of the Titanic disaster – published in a 1912 book, Thomas Andrews: Shipbuilder by Shan Bullock, and thereby perpetuated – and led to popular belief that Andrews may have made no attempt to escape and awaited his end in the smoking room, although in the book itself Bullock clearly stated that Andrews worked "to the bitter end" to help both passengers and crew.

Moreover, there is circumstantial evidence to suggest that Stewart had left the ship in lifeboat No. 15 at approximately 1:40 am, 40 minutes before the ship sank. In Thomas Andrews: Shipbuilder, Bullock concluded that Andrews likely stayed in the smoking room for some time to gather his thoughts, then continued assisting with the evacuation, and discussed several other later sightings of Andrews, including one in the engine room, where he was allegedly seen with Chief Engineer Joseph Bell and guarantee group member Archie Frost, and another on the boat deck. This is further corroborated by a private letter written by Andrews' friend David Galloway to Lord Pirrie; Galloway interviewed crewmembers to see if they had any information on Andrews' fate.

An unnamed crewmember reportedly saw Andrews "throwing deck chairs overboard to the unfortunates struggling in the water below" to use as floatation devices. Mary Sloan, a stewardess on the ship, said that Andrews persuaded her to enter a lifeboat, saying, "Ladies, you must get in at once! There is not a moment to lose! You cannot pick and choose your boat! Don't hesitate, get in!" Bullock placed this event at 2:05 am. Andrews was also reportedly seen, carrying a lifebelt, possibly the lifebelt in the smoking room, heading to the bridge, perhaps to find Captain Smith. Mess steward Cecil Fitzpatrick claimed to have seen Andrews and Captain Smith together on the bridge just a few minutes before the ship began its final plunge, and that both men put on lifebelts; Smith told Andrews, "We cannot stay any longer; she is going!" Fitzpatrick saw Andrews and Smith both jump overboard just as the water reached the bridge.

== Legacy ==
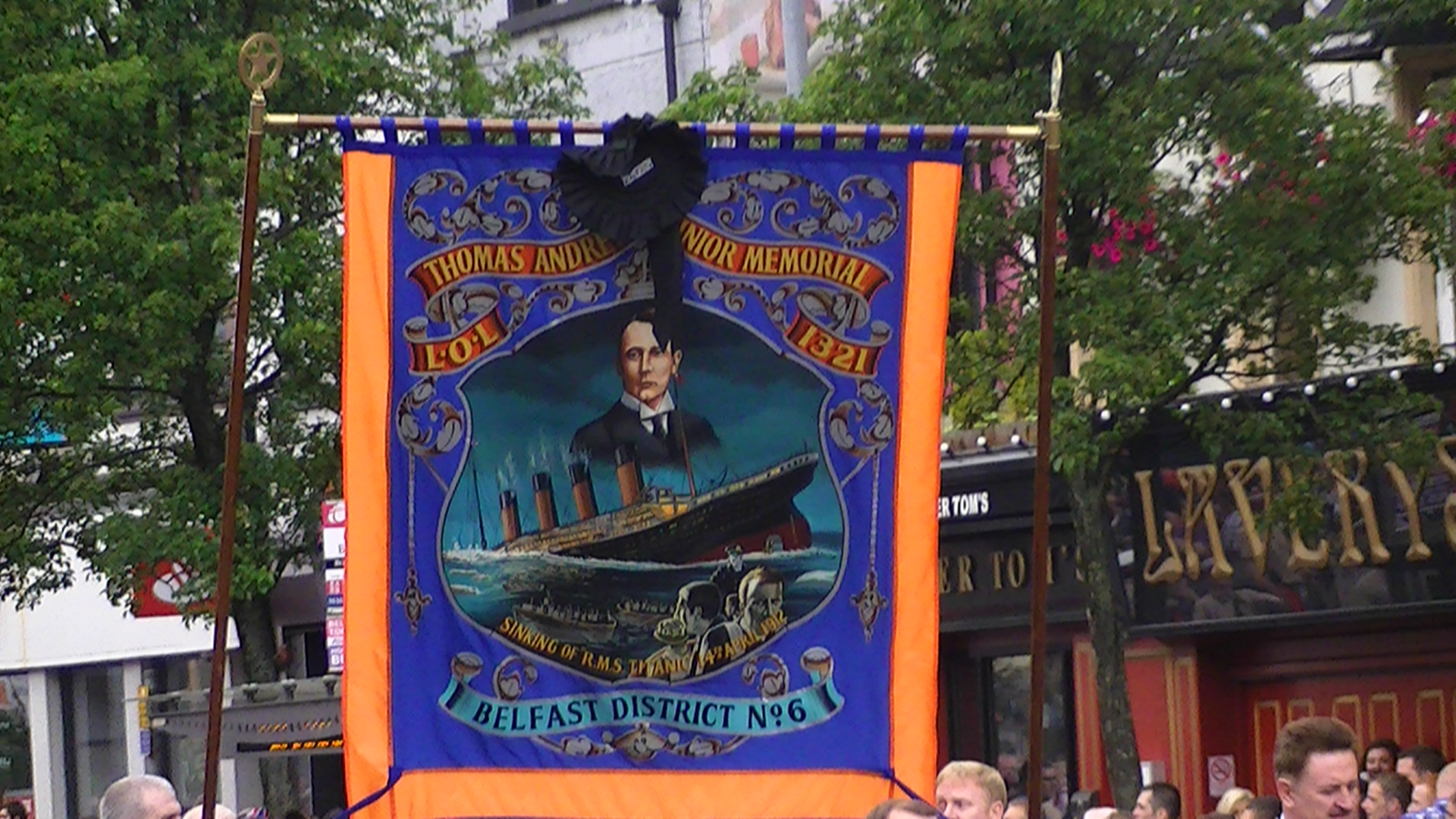
Unionist banner in Belfast commemorating Thomas Andrews, and showing the sinking Titanic

Violet Jessop said that while on the Carpathia, she had searched for Andrews but found he was among the missing when the roll was called. On 19 April 1912, his father received a telegram from his mother's cousin, who had spoken with survivors in New York: "INTERVIEW WITH TITANIC'S OFFICERS. ALL UNANIMOUS THAT ANDREWS DIED A HEROIC DEATH, THINKING ONLY OF OTHER'S SAFETY. EXTEND HEARTFELT SYMPATHY TO ALL."

Newspaper accounts of the disaster labelled Andrews a hero. Mary Sloan later wrote in a letter: "Mr. Andrews met his fate like a true hero, realising the great danger, and gave up his life to save the women and children of the Titanic. They will find it hard to replace him." A short biography, Thomas Andrews: Shipbuilder, was produced within the year by Shan Bullock at the request of Sir Horace Plunkett, a member of Parliament, who felt that Andrews' life was worthy of being memorialised.

In his home town, Comber, one of the earliest and most substantial memorials for a single victim of the Titanic disaster was built. The Thomas Andrews Jr. Memorial Hall was opened in January 1914. The architects were Young and McKenzie with sculpted work by the artist Sophia Rosamond Praeger. The hall is now maintained by the South Eastern Education Board and used by The Andrews Memorial Primary School. An Ulster History Circle blue plaque is located on his house in Windsor Avenue, Belfast.

The SS Nomadic remains the sole surviving ship designed by Andrews.

Asteroid 245158 Thomasandrews was named in his honour in 2004.

== Portrayals ==
- Patrick Macnee (1956) Kraft Television Theatre; A Night to Remember
- Michael Goodliffe (1958) A Night to Remember (British film)
- Geoffrey Whitehead (1979) S.O.S. Titanic; TV Movie
- Geoffrey Whitehead (1996) Danielle Steel's No Greater Love
- Victor Garber (1997) Titanic
- Michael Cerveris (1997) Titanic; Broadway Musical
- Vern Urich (1998) Titanic: Secrets Revealed; TV Documentary
- Don Lynch (2003) Ghosts of the Abyss; Documentary
- Damian O'Hare (2005) Titanic: Birth of a Legend; TV Documentary
- Paul Mundell (2011) Curiosity Episode: "What Sank Titanic?"
- Stephen Campbell Moore (2012) Titanic; TV series/3 episodes
- Billy Carter (2012) Titanic: Blood and Steel; TV series/12 episodes
- Nick Danan (2012) The Titanic Boys; Stage Production- Grand Opera House, Belfast
- Stephen Hogan (2012) Saving The Titanic; PBS TV Movie
- Robert Bagdon (2013) Belfast Air; Short Film
- Greg Castiglioni (2013) Titanic (musical) (London premier) & 2015; (Toronto); directed by Thom Southerland
- Kazuki Kato (2015) Titanic; Japanese Musical; directed by Thom Sutherland
- Mark Davison (2016) - Drunk History (British TV series): Season 2: Episode 2: "Scott of the Antarctic/Sinking of the Titanic"
- Michael Joseph (2017) - Titanic: Sinking the Myths (docudrama)
- Jonny Everett (2025) - Titanic Sinks Tonight (BBC 4-part drama-documentary series)
