= Sir James Andrews, 1st Baronet =

Lord Chief Justice of Northern Ireland

The Right Honourable Sir James Andrews Bt PC (NI)
- Plaque sited in the Queen's University of Belfast School of Law. It reads; "This building is named James Andrews House in memory of the Rt. Hon. Sir James Andrews, Baronet, Lord Chief Justice of Northern Ireland 1937–1951, Pro-Chancellor of Queen's University 1929–1951, President of the Faculty of Law Society 1937-1951"
- Born: January 3, 1877; Comber, County Down, Ireland
- Died: February 18, 1951 (aged 74); Comber, County Down, Northern Ireland
- Education: Royal Belfast Academical Institution; Trinity College Dublin
- Spouse: Jane Lawson Ormrod (m. 1922-1951)
- Children: 3
- Family: J. M. Andrews (brother); Thomas Andrews (brother); William Pirrie, 1st Viscount Pirrie (uncle); William Drennan (great-grandfather)

Sir James Andrews, 1st Baronet, PC (NI) (3 January 1877 – 18 February 1951) was Lord Chief Justice of Northern Ireland and brother of Prime Minister J. M. Andrews and Thomas Andrews, builder of the RMS Titanic.

== Early life ==
Andrews was born in Comber, County Down, the third son of Thomas Andrews and his wife, Eliza Pirrie, sister of William Pirrie, 1st Viscount Pirrie. He was a great-grandson of the United Irishman leader William Drennan. Andrews was a sports fan and was passionate about shooting, golf, cricket and sailing (mainly on Strangford Lough).

In 1922 Andrews married Jane Lawson Ormrod (d. 1964), daughter of Joseph Ormrod, of Bolton, and widow of Captain Cyril Gerald Haselden RE. From her first marriage, Jane had three children, Alexander Gerrard Haselden, Mick Haselden and Joyce Haselden.

== Career ==
Although he came from a family of industrialists, Andrews chose to read law.

The barrister and memoirist Maurice Healy, who admired both James and his uncle William, thought that on balance James was the better judge, as he did not have his uncle's fondness for handing down prison sentences of exceptional severity.

He died in Comber in 1951, his estate valued at £40,142 1s. 3d. in England; Northern Irish probate sealed in England, 30 June 1951. The baronetcy died with him.

The School of Law at Queen's University of Belfast named its building on University Square Sir James Andrews House in his honour.

Legal offices
Preceded by William Moore	Lord Chief Justice of Northern Ireland; 1937–1951	Succeeded by John MacDermott
Baronetage of the United Kingdom
New creation	Baronet (of Comber); 1942–1951	Extinct
