= William Pirrie, 1st Viscount Pirrie =

Shipbuilder and businessman (1847–1924)

The Right Honourable The Viscount Pirrie KP PC PC (Ire)
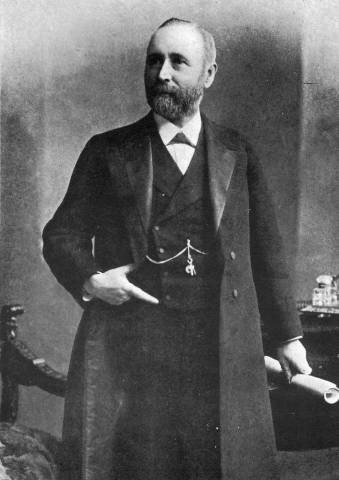

Lord Lieutenant of Belfast
- In office 1911–1924
- Preceded by: The Earl of Shaftesbury
- Succeeded by: Sir Thomas Dixon

Lord Mayor of Belfast
- In office 1896–1898
- Preceded by: William McCammond
- Succeeded by: James Henderson

Senator
- In office 1921–1924

Personal details
- Born: 31 May 1847 Quebec City, Canada East, Province of Canada
- Died: 7 June 1924 (aged 77) RMS Ebro, Atlantic Ocean
- Resting place: Belfast City Cemetery
- Spouse: Margaret Montgomery Carlisle (m. 1879)
- Relatives: J. M. Andrews (nephew); Thomas Andrews (nephew); Sir James Andrews, 1st Baronet (nephew); Alexander Carlisle (brother-in-law)
- Occupation: Shipbuilder, businessman

William James Pirrie, 1st Viscount Pirrie (31 May 1847 – 7 June 1924) was a leading British shipbuilder and businessman. He was chairman of Harland & Wolff, shipbuilders, between 1895 and 1924, and also served as Lord Mayor of Belfast between 1896 and 1898. He was ennobled as Baron Pirrie in 1906, appointed a Knight of the Order of St Patrick in 1908 and made Viscount Pirrie in 1921. Lord Pirrie was involved in the building of the Olympic-class ocean liners, along with his nephew Thomas Andrews. In Belfast, he was already a controversial figure: a Protestant employer associated as a leading Liberal with a policy of Home Rule for Ireland.

== Background ==
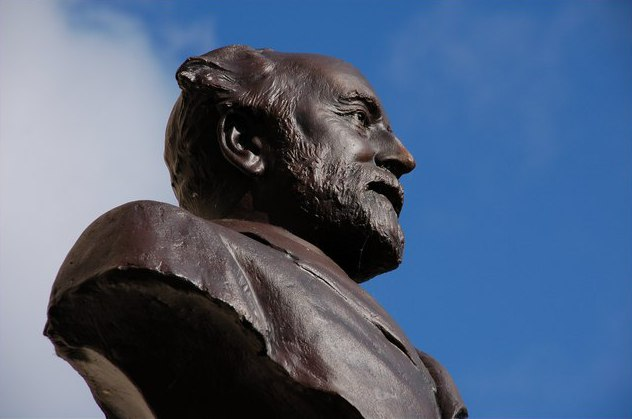
Bust of Lord Pirrie in the grounds of Belfast City Hall.

Pirrie was born in Quebec City, Canada East. He was taken back to Ireland when he was two years old and spent his childhood at Conlig House, aka Little Clandeboye Conlig, County Down. Belonging to a prominent family, his nephews included J. M. Andrews, who would later become Prime Minister of Northern Ireland, Thomas Andrews, who succeeded Pirrie as managing director, and Sir James Andrews, 1st Baronet, the Lord Chief Justice of Northern Ireland.

== Career ==
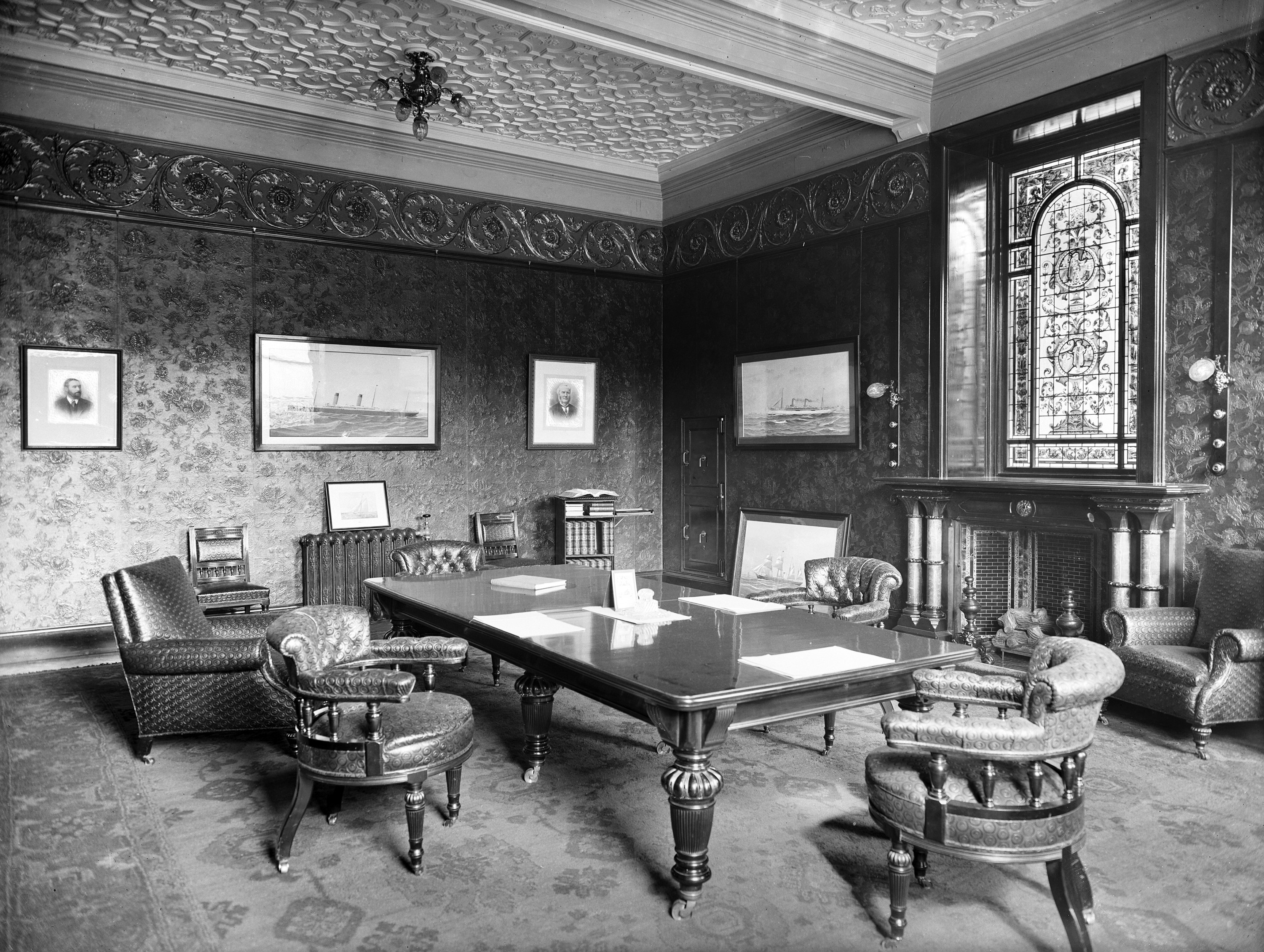
Chairman Pirrie's office at the headquarters of Harland & Wolff.

Pirrie was educated at the Royal Belfast Academical Institution before entering Harland and Wolff shipyard as a gentleman apprentice in 1862. Twelve years later he was made a partner in the firm, and on the death of Sir Edward Harland in 1895 he became its chairman, a position he was to hold until his death. As well as overseeing the world's largest shipyard, Pirrie was elected Lord Mayor of Belfast in 1896, and was re-elected to the office as well as made an Irish Privy Counsellor the following year. He became Belfast's first honorary freeman in 1898, and served in the same year as High Sheriff of Antrim and subsequently of County Down. In February 1900, he was elected President of the Chamber of Shipping of the United Kingdom, where he had been vice-president the previous year. He helped finance the Liberals in Ulster in the 1906 general election, and that same year, at the height of Harland and Wolff's success, he was raised to the peerage as Baron Pirrie, of the City of Belfast.

In 1907, Pirrie was appointed Comptroller of the Household to the Lord-Lieutenant of Ireland, and in 1908, he was appointed Knight of St Patrick (KP). Pro-Chancellor of The Queen's University of Belfast from 1908 to 1914, Pirrie was also in the years before the First World War a member of the Committee on Irish Finance as well as Lieutenant for the City of Belfast (both 1911)

In February 1912, after chairing a famous meeting of the Ulster Liberal Association at which Winston Churchill defended the government's policy of Home Rule for Ireland, Pirrie was jeered on the streets of Belfast, and assaulted as he boarded a steamer in Larne: pelted with rotten eggs, herrings, and bags of flour. In 1910, the Ulster Liberal Association, an overwhelmingly Protestant body, with a weekly newspaper, and branch network throughout Ulster, had adopted (in opposition to the Ulster Liberal Unionist Association) an explicitly pro-home rule position.

Two months later, April 1912, he was to travel aboard RMS Titanic, but illness prevented him. During the war he was a member of the War Office Supply Board, and in 1918 became Comptroller-General of Merchant Shipbuilding, organising British production of merchant ships.

In 1921, Pirrie was elected to the Northern Ireland Senate, and that same year was created Viscount Pirrie, of the City of Belfast, in the honours for the opening of the Parliament of Northern Ireland in July 1921, for his war work and charity work.

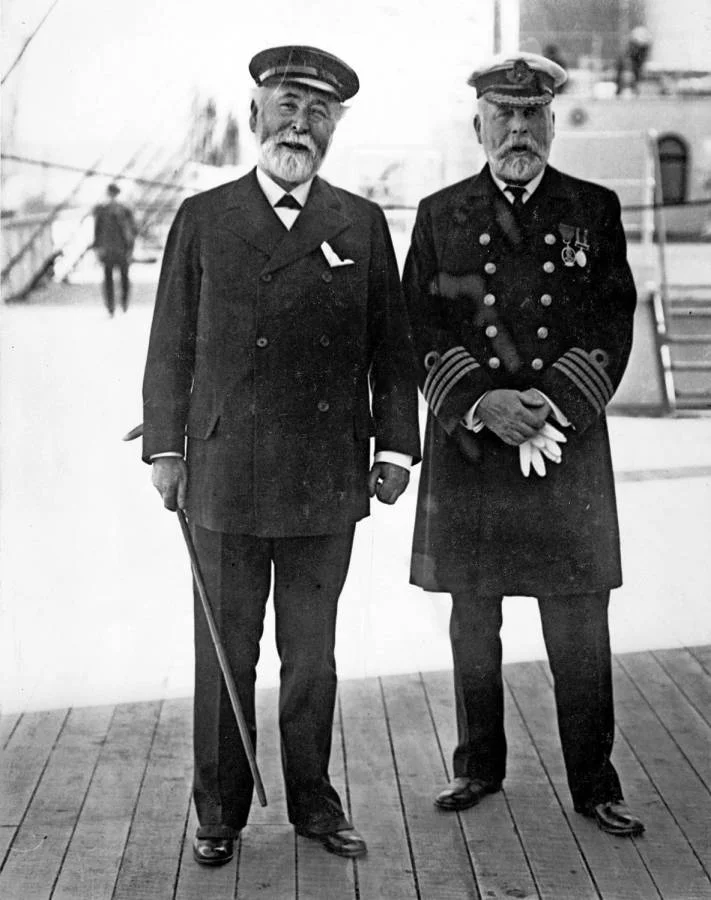
Lord Pirrie and Captain Smith aboard Olympic, photo taken 9 June 1911.

== Personal life ==
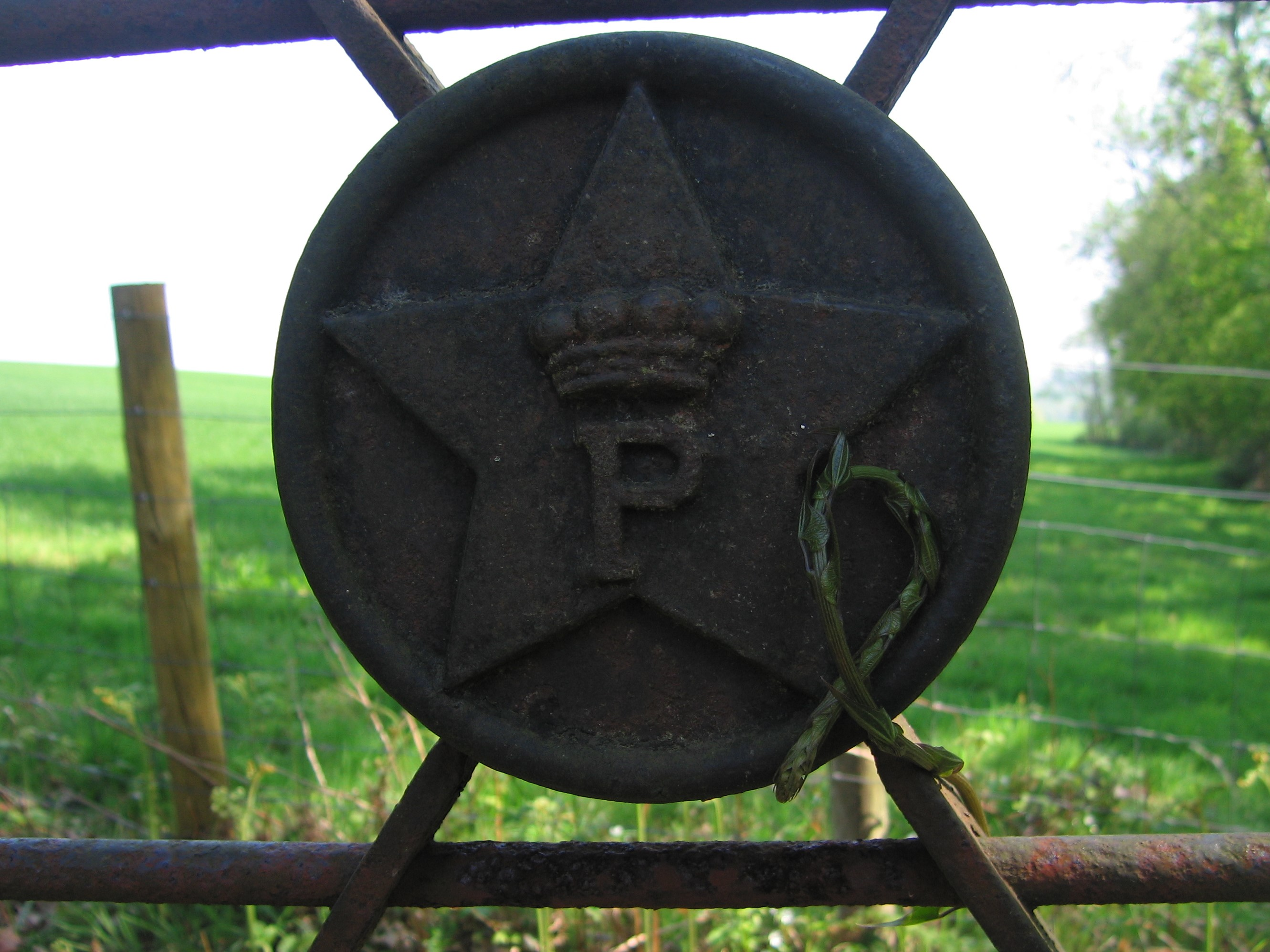
Pirrie crown emblem

Lord Pirrie married Margaret Montgomery Carlisle, sister of future Harland & Wolff architect Alexander Carlisle and daughter of John Carlisle, M.A., of Belfast, on 17 April 1879. In 1909 Lord Pirrie bought Witley Park, formerly the residence of Whitaker Wright. The letter P with a coronet above adorn metal gates and fence posts in the estate and previously owned lands.

Pirrie built the Temple of the Four Winds near the Devil's Punchbowl, Hindhead. The octagonal plinth still remains. Lord Pirrie's nephew, Thomas Andrews, died on RMS Titanic.

== Death ==
In March 1924, Pirrie, his wife, and her sister sailed on a Royal Mail Steam Packet Company liner from Southampton on a business trip to South America. They travelled overland from Buenos Aires to Chile, where they embarked aboard the Pacific Steam Navigation Company's RMS Ebro. Pirrie caught pneumonia in Antofagasta, and his condition worsened when the ship reached Iquique. At Panama City two nurses embarked to care for him. By then he was very weak, but insisted on being brought on deck to see the canal. He admired how Ebro was handled through the locks.

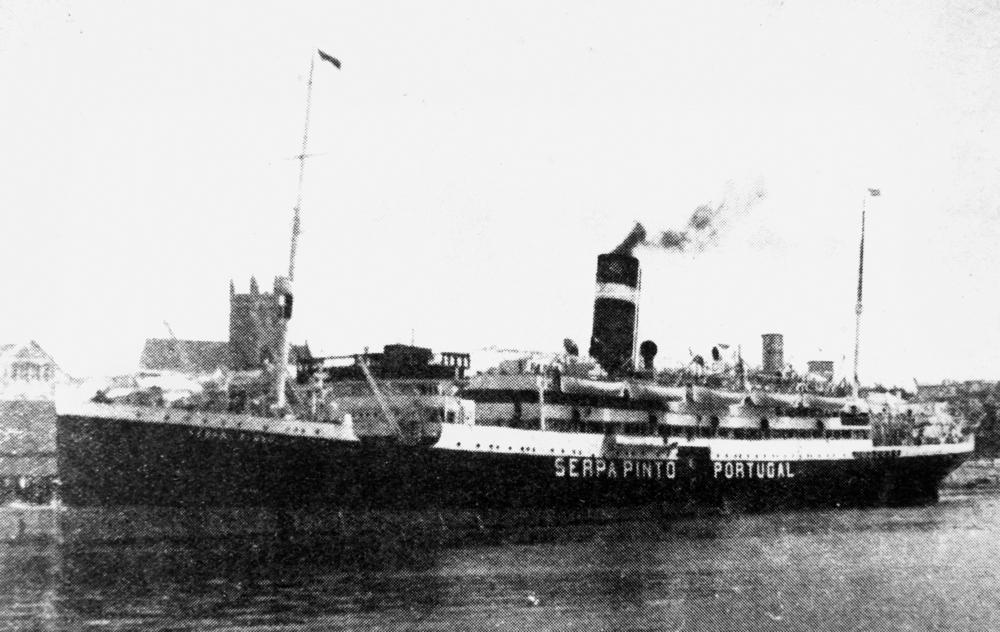
RMS Ebro, aboard which Pirrie died

On 7 June Pirrie died at sea off Cuba. His body was embalmed. On 13 June Ebro reached Pier 42 on the North River in New York, where Pirrie's friend Baron Inverforth and his wife met Viscountess Pirrie and her sister. UK ships in the port of New York lowered their flags to half-mast, and Pirrie's body was transferred to Pier 59, where it was embarked on White Star Line's RMS Olympic, one of the largest ships Pirrie ever built, to be repatriated to the UK. He was buried in Belfast City Cemetery. The barony and viscountcy died with him. Lady Pirrie died on 19 June 1935. A memorial to Pirrie in the grounds of Belfast City Hall was unveiled in 2006.

== Portrayals ==
- Gordon Langford Rowe (2005) - Titanic: Birth of a Legend; TV Documentary
- Timothy West (2012) - Titanic; TV series
- Derek Jacobi (2012) - Titanic: Blood and Steel; TV series/12 episodes

== Arms ==
Coat of arms of William Pirrie, 1st Viscount Pirrie
Crest A falcon's head erased per saltire Argent and Gules. Escutcheon Argent a saltire Gules between in chief and in base a bugle horn stringed Sable and in fess two sea horses respecting one another Proper. Supporters On either side a falcon each resting its exterior claw on an anchor Proper beaked membered and collared Sable belled Or. Motto Deeds Not Words Orders Order of Saint Patrick: QUIS SEPARABIT? (Latin for 'Who will separate [us]?')

Civic offices
Preceded by William McCammond	Lord Mayor of Belfast; 1896–1898	Succeeded by James Henderson
Honorary titles
Preceded by The Earl of Shaftesbury	Lord Lieutenant of Belfast; 1911–1924	Succeeded by Sir Thomas Dixon, Bt
Peerage of the United Kingdom
New creation	Viscount Pirrie; 1921–1924	Extinct
New creation	Baron Pirrie; 1906–1924	Extinct
