= Harland & Wolff =

Shipyard in Belfast, Northern Ireland

Coordinates: 54.605°N 5.905°W

Harland & Wolff Group

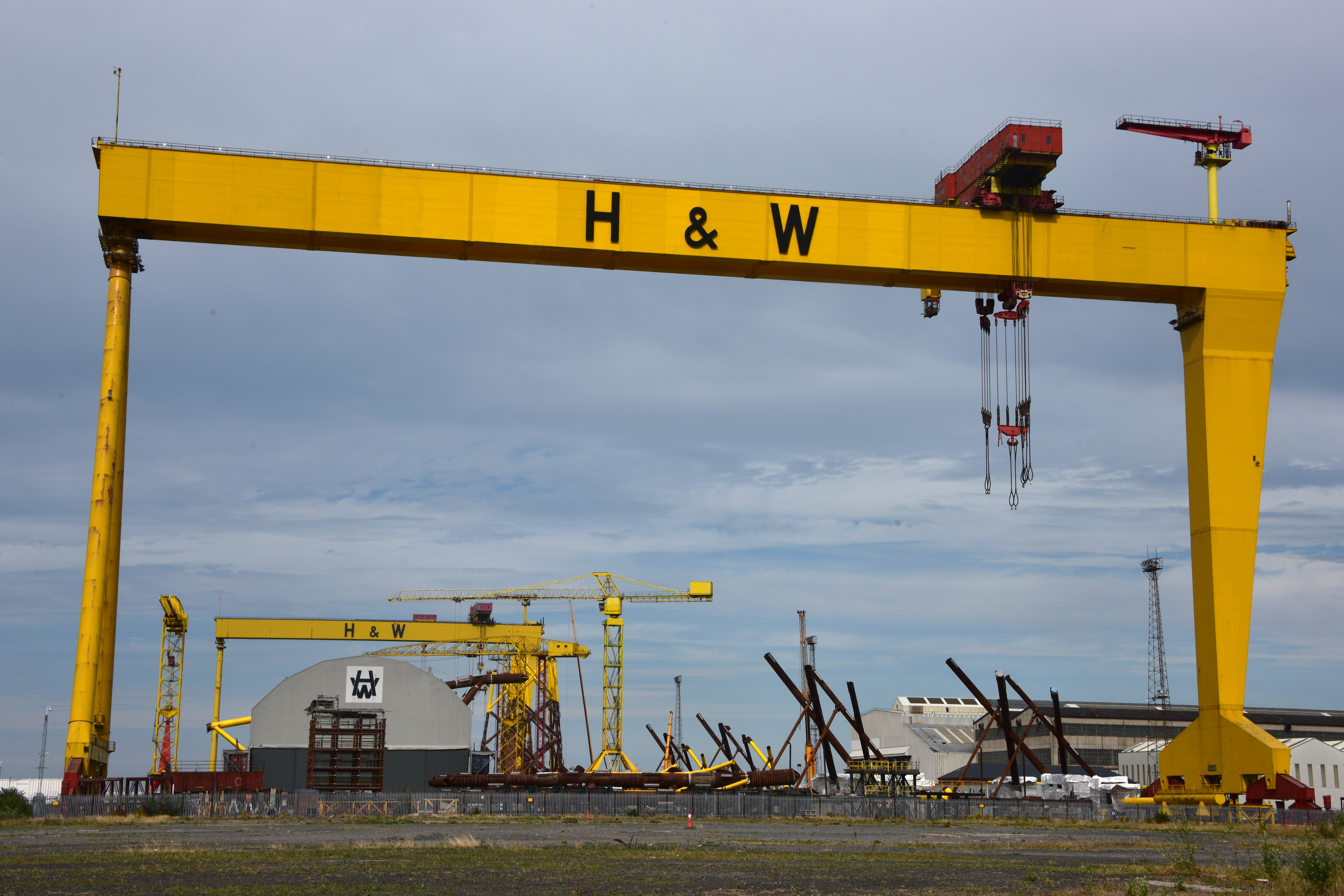
- The gantry cranes Samson and Goliath (built in 1974 and 1969, respectively) have become symbols of the city of Belfast.
- Type: Private
- Industry: Shipbuilding; Ship repair; Civil Engineering; Marine Engineering; Offshore construction
- Founded: 11 April 1861; 165 years ago; 1977 (nationalised); 1989 (privatised)
- Founders: Edward Harland; Gustav Wilhelm Wolff
- Headquarters: London, England
- Revenue: ▼£27.7 million (2022)
- Operating income: ▼ -£70.4 million (2022)
- Number of employees: 800 (2023)
- Parent: Navantia
- Website: www.harland-wolff.com

Harland & Wolff is a British shipbuilding and fabrication company headquartered in London with sites in Belfast, Arnish, Appledore and Methil. It specialises in ship repair, shipbuilding and offshore construction.

Today, the company is focused on supporting five sectors: defence, energy, cruise and ferry, renewables, and commercial. It offers services including technical services, fabrication and construction, repair and maintenance, in-service support, conversion, and decommissioning.

Having entered administration for the second time in five years, it was bought by Navantia in January 2025.

== Overview ==
Harland & Wolff built the majority of the ocean liners for the White Star Line in the early 20th century, including the Olympic-class trio – RMS Olympic, RMS Titanic and HMHS Britannic. Their ships also include the Royal Navy's HMS Belfast; Royal Mail Line's flagship Andes; Shaw, Savill & Albion's Southern Cross; Union-Castle's RMS Pendennis Castle; P&O's Canberra; and Hamburg-America's Amerika of 1905.

In 2022, the company was awarded a major naval contract as part of Team Resolute (alongside Navantia UK and BMT), to deliver the Royal Fleet Auxiliary's three new Fleet Solid Support vessels. Harland and Wolff's official history, Shipbuilders to the World, was published in 1986.

== History ==
=== 19th century ===
Harland & Wolff was formed in 1861 by Edward Harland (1831–1895) and Hamburg-born Gustav Wilhelm Wolff (1834–1913) who had moved to England aged 15, and then to Ireland in 1857. In 1858, Harland, then general manager, bought the small shipyard on Queen's Island from his employer Robert Hickson.

After buying Hickson's shipyard, Harland made his assistant Wolff a partner in the company. Wolff was the nephew of Gustav Schwabe, Hamburg, who was heavily invested in the Bibby Line, and the first three ships that the newly incorporated shipyard built were for that line. Harland made several innovations, including replacing the wooden upper decks with iron ones which increased the strength of the ships; and giving the hulls a flatter bottom and squarer cross section, which increased their capacity. Walter Henry Wilson became a partner of the company in 1874.

When Harland died in 1895, William James Pirrie became the chairman of the company and remained so until his death in 1924.

=== 1900s to 1940s ===
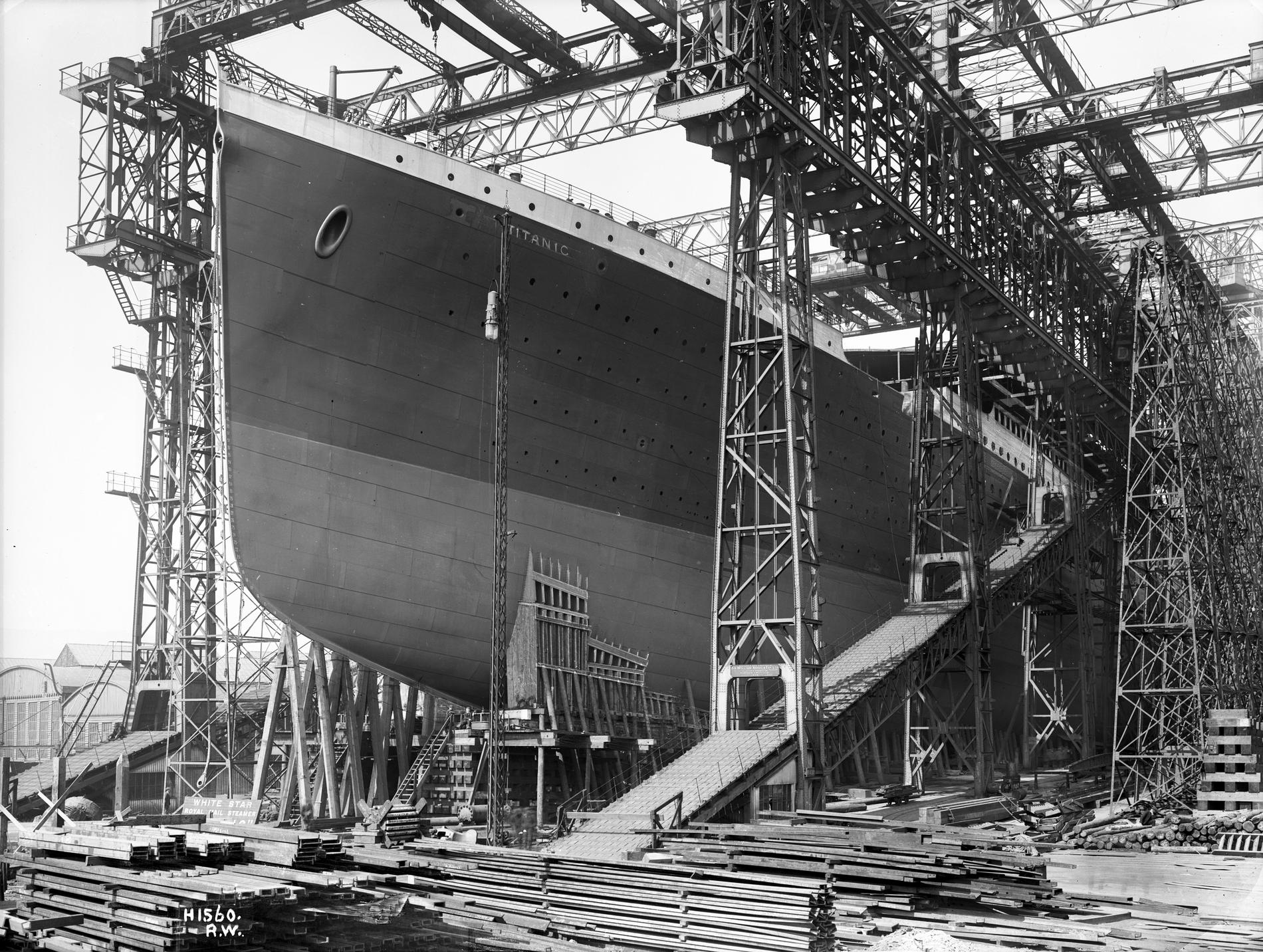
RMS Titanic ready for launch

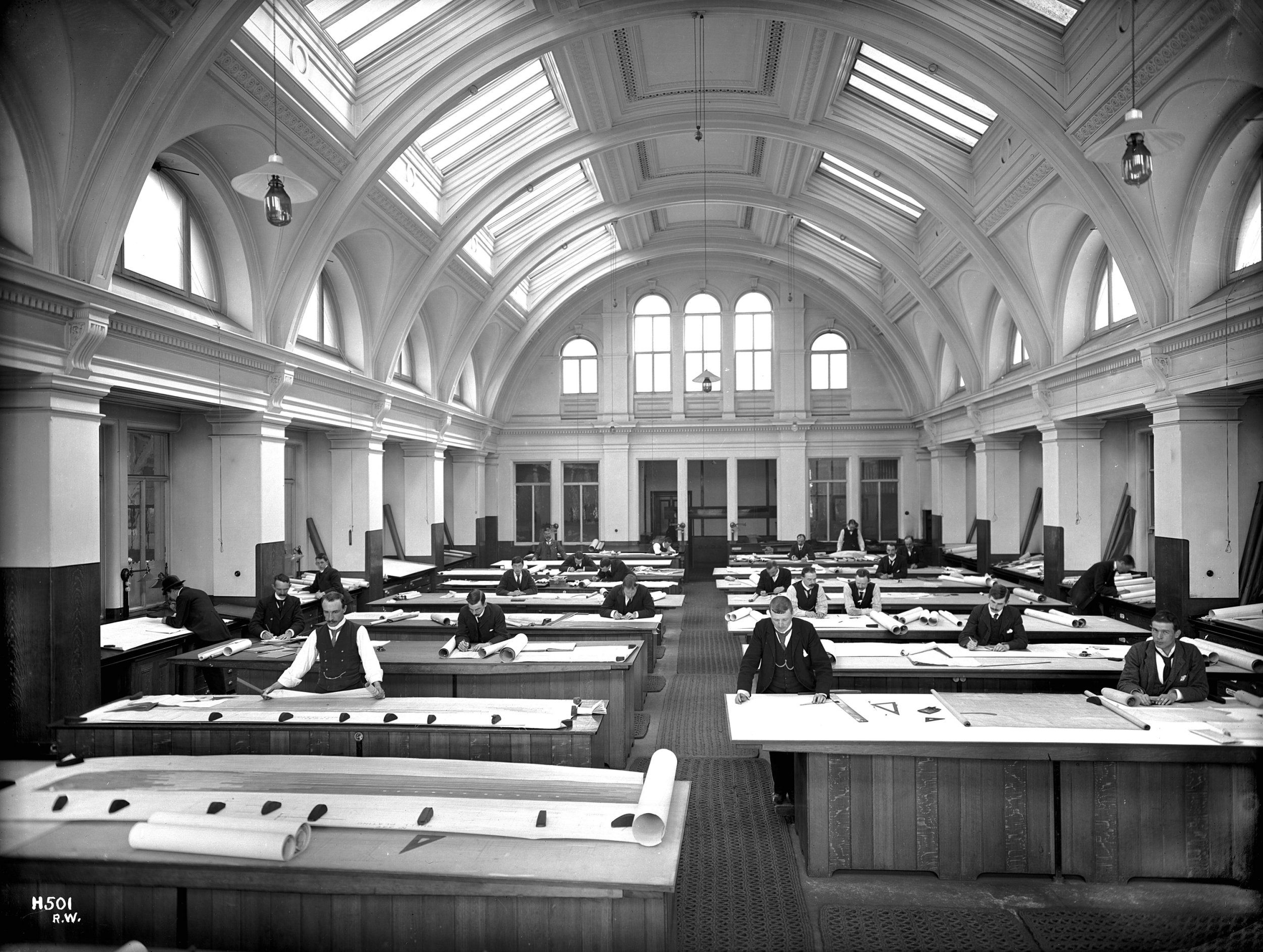
Harland & Wolff's Belfast drawing offices early in the 20th century

Thomas Andrews, nephew of the then-chairman William Pirrie, became the general manager and head of the draughting department in 1907. It was in this period that the company built Olympic and the two other ships in her class, Titanic and Britannic, between 1909 and 1914. It commissioned Sir William Arrol & Co. to construct a massive twin slipway and gantry structure for the project.

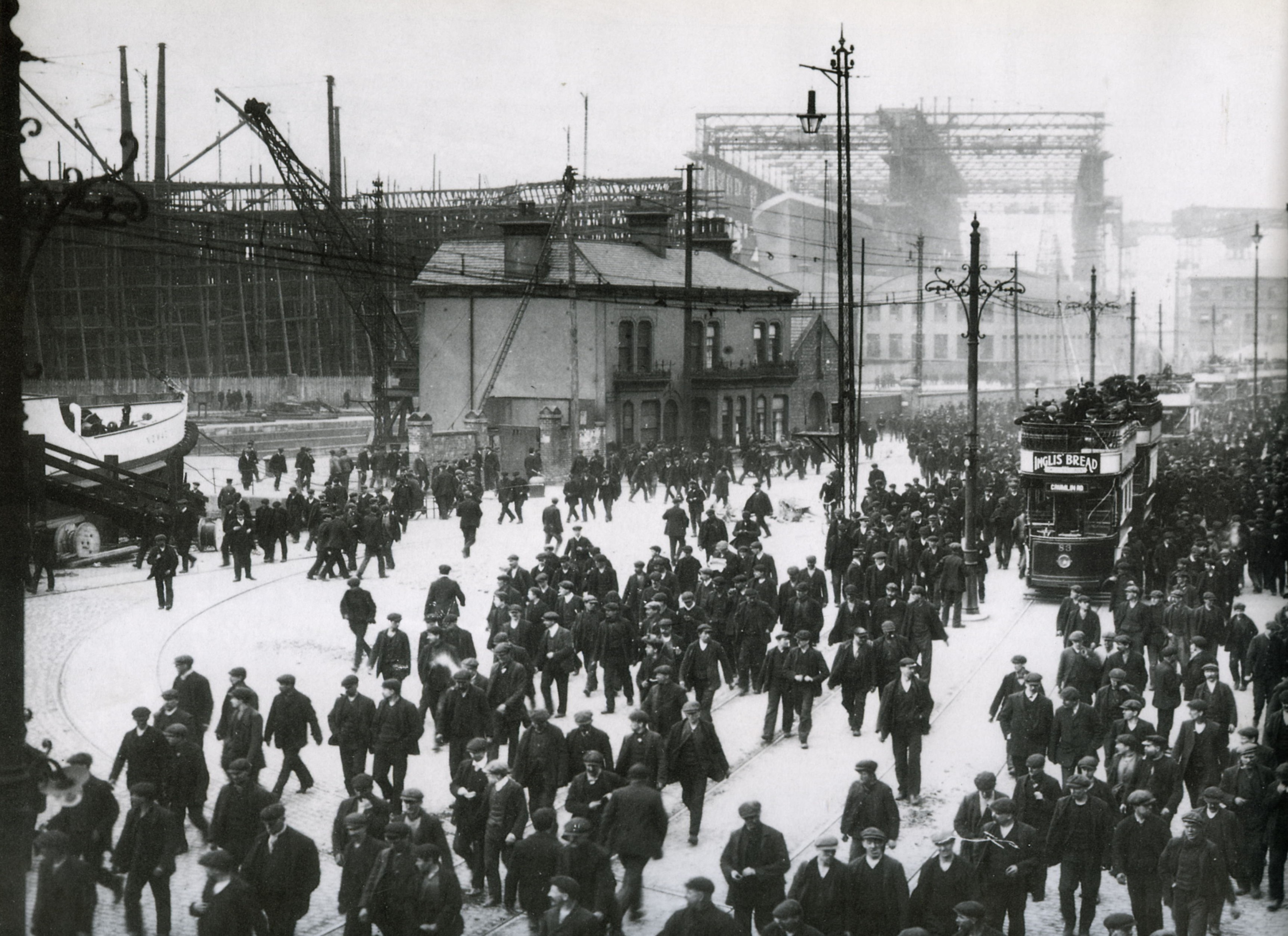
Workers leaving the shipyard at Queens Road in early 1911. RMS Titanic is in the background, beneath the Arrol Gantry. The bow of SS Nomadic is at the far left.

In 1912, due primarily to increasing political instability in Ireland, the company acquired another shipyard at Govan in Glasgow, Scotland. It bought the former London & Glasgow Engineering & Iron Shipbuilding Co's Middleton and Govan New shipyards in Govan and Mackie & Thomson's Govan Old Yard, which had been owned by William Beardmore & Company. The three neighbouring yards were amalgamated and redeveloped to provide a total of seven building berths, a fitting-out basin and extensive workshops. Harland & Wolff specialised in building tankers and cargo ships at Govan. The nearby shipyard of A. & J. Inglis, on the north bank of the Clyde and the east bank of the Kelvin, was also purchased by Harland & Wolff in 1919, along with the Meadowside shipyard of D. and W. Henderson and Company, on the north bank of the Clyde but on the west bank of the Kelvin. The company also bought a stake in the company's primary steel supplier, David Colville & Sons. Harland & Wolff also established shipyards at Bootle in Liverpool, North Woolwich in London and Southampton. However, these shipyards were all eventually closed, beginning in the early 1960s when the company opted to consolidate its operations in Belfast.

In the First World War, Harland & Wolff built Abercrombie-class monitors and cruisers, including the 15-inch gun armed "large light cruiser" HMS Glorious. In 1918, the company opened a new shipyard on the eastern side of the Musgrave Channel which was named the East Yard. This yard specialised in mass-produced ships of standard design developed in the First World War.

In March 1921, Margaret Pirrie unveiled memorials, naming the company employees who had lost their lives in the recent war. They totalled 886, comprising 494 from Belfast, 171 from Govan, 87 from Liverpool, 52 from Greenock, 35 from Finnieston, 32 from Southampton and 15 from Scotstoun; including Harland & Wolff's associated companies took the group's loss of employees to 1694.

During the 1920s, Catholic workers, Socialists and labour activists were routinely expelled from their jobs in the shipyard: Similar actions had occurred in June 1898 and July, 1912. See The Troubles in Ulster (1920–1922).

The company started an aircraft manufacturing subsidiary with Short Brothers, called Short & Harland Limited in 1936. Its first order was for 189 Handley Page Hereford bombers built under licence from Handley Page for the Royal Air Force. In the Second World War, this factory built Short Stirling bombers as the Hereford was removed from service.

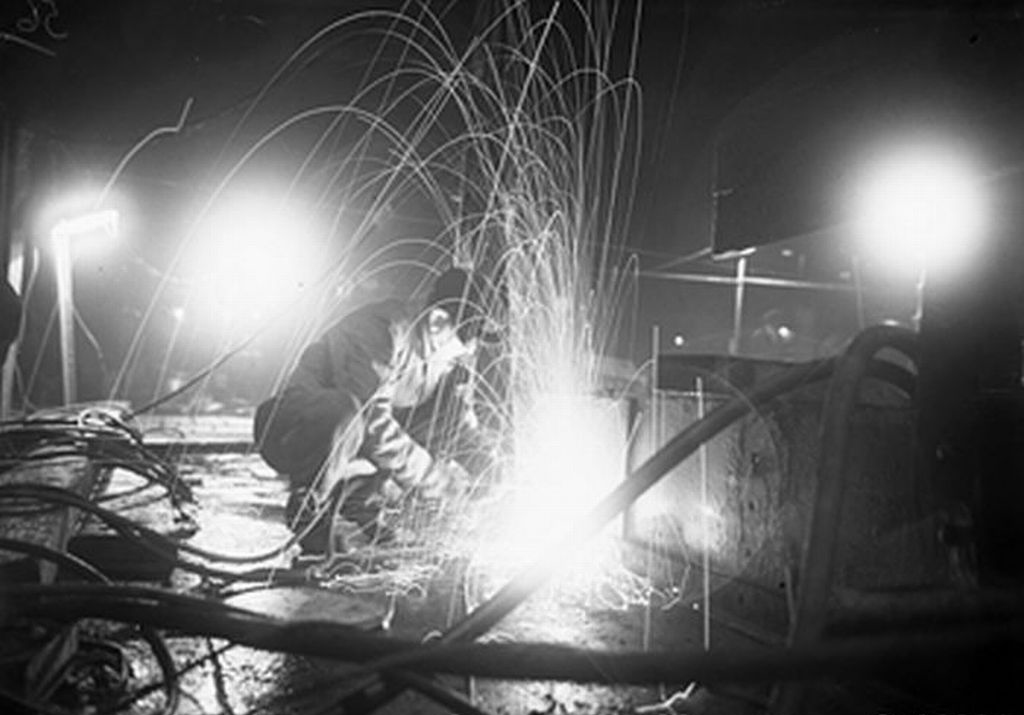
A burner operating at night on the deck of a ship at Harland & Wolff's Liverpool yard (27 October 1944)

The shipyard was busy in the Second World War, building six aircraft carriers, two cruisers (including HMS Belfast) and 131 other naval ships; and repairing over 22,000 vessels. It also manufactured tanks and artillery components. It was in this period that the company's workforce peaked at around 35,000 people. However, many of the vessels built in this era were commissioned right at the end of the Second World War, as Harland & Wolff were focused on ship repair in the first three years of the war. The yard on Queen's Island was heavily bombed by the Luftwaffe in April and May 1941 during the Belfast Blitz, causing considerable damage to the shipbuilding facilities and destroying the aircraft factory.

=== 1950s to 1990s ===
With the rise of the jet-powered airliner in the late 1950s, the demand for ocean liners declined. This, coupled with competition from Japan, led to difficulties for the British shipbuilding industry. The last liner that the company launched was MV Arlanza for Royal Mail Line in 1960; the last liner completed was SS Canberra for P&O in 1961.

In the 1960s, achievements for the yard included the tanker Myrina, which was the first supertanker built in the UK and the largest vessel ever launched down a slipway, as it was in September 1967. In the same period the yard also built the semi-submersible drilling rig Sea Quest which, due to its three-legged design, was launched down three parallel slipways. This was a first and only time this was ever done.

In the mid-1960s, the Geddes Committee recommended that the British government advance loans and subsidies to British shipyards to modernise production methods and shipyard infrastructure to preserve jobs. A major modernisation programme at the shipyard was undertaken, centred on the creation of a large construction graving dock serviced by two Krupp Goliath cranes, the iconic Samson and Goliath, enabling the shipyard to build much larger post-war merchant ships, including one of 333,000 tonnes.

The shipyard had a long-standing reputation as a Protestant closed shop, and in 1970, during the Troubles, 500 Catholic workers were expelled from their role.

In 1971, the Arrol Gantry complex, within which many ships were built until the early 1960s, was demolished.

Shipbuilding Industry (Northern Ireland) Order 1975
- Statutory Instrument
- Parliament of the United Kingdom
- Citation: SI 1975/814

Dates
- Made: 14 May 1975
- Commencement: 21 May 1975
Other legislation
Made under	Northern Ireland Act 1974

Text of statute as originally enacted

Shipbuilding Industry (No. 2) (Northern Ireland) Order 1975
- Statutory Instrument
- Parliament of the United Kingdom
- Citation: SI 1975/1309

Dates
- Made: 6 August 1975
- Commencement: 13 August 1975
Other legislation
Made under	Northern Ireland Act 1974

Text of statute as originally enacted

Continuing financial problems led to the company's nationalisation by the interim Shipbuilding Industry (Northern Ireland) Order 1975 (SI 1975/814) and the permanent Shipbuilding Industry (No. 2) (Northern Ireland) Order 1975 (SI 1975/1309). It did not become part of British Shipbuilders when other shipbuilders were nationalised in 1977. The nationalised company was sold by the British government in 1989 to a management/employee buy-out in partnership with the Norwegian shipping magnate Fred Olsen; this buy-out led to a new company called Harland & Wolff Holdings Plc. By this time, the number of people employed by the company had fallen to around 3,000.

For the next few years, Harland & Wolff specialised in building standard Suezmax oil tankers, and has continued to concentrate on vessels for the offshore oil and gas industry. It has made some forays outside this market.

In the late 1990s, the yard was part of the then British Aerospace team for the Royal Navy's Future Carrier (CVF) programme. It was envisaged that the ship would be assembled at the Harland & Wolff dry-dock in Belfast. In 1999, BAE merged with Marconi Electronic Systems. The new company, BAE Systems Marine, included the former Marconi shipyards on the Clyde and at Barrow-in-Furness thus rendering H&W's involvement surplus to requirements.

Faced with competitive pressures, Harland & Wolff sought to shift and broaden their portfolio, focusing less on shipbuilding and more on design and structural engineering, as well as ship repair, offshore construction projects and competing for other projects to do with metal engineering and construction. This led to Harland & Wolff constructing a series of bridges in Britain and also in the Republic of Ireland, such as the James Joyce Bridge and the restoration of Dublin's Ha'penny Bridge, building on the success of its first foray into the civil engineering sector with the construction of the Foyle Bridge in the 1980s.

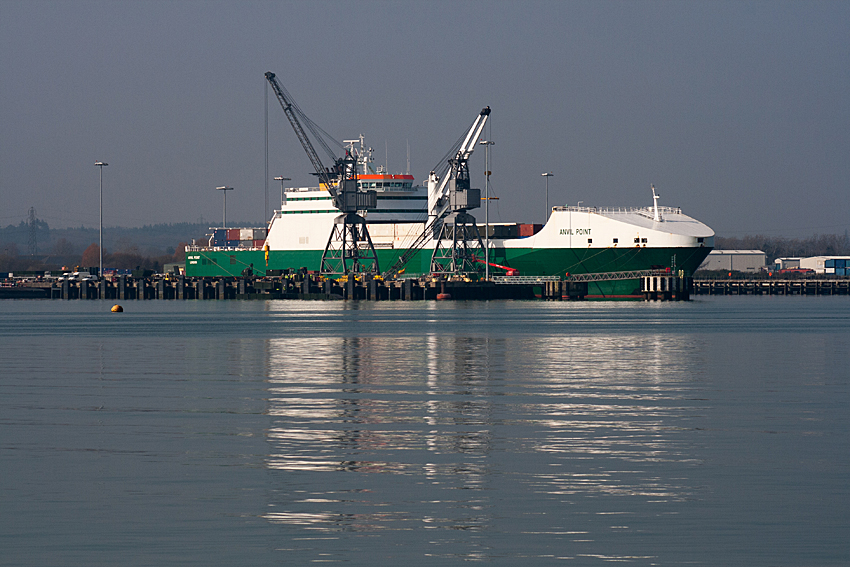
Anvil Point at Marchwood

Harland & Wolff's last shipbuilding project was MV Anvil Point, one of six near identical Point-class sealift ships built for use by the Ministry of Defence. The ship, built under licence from German shipbuilders Flensburger Schiffbau-Gesellschaft, was launched in 2003.

The company unsuccessfully tendered against Chantiers de l'Atlantique for the construction of Cunard's Queen Mary 2.

=== 2000s to 2020s ===
In 2003, Harland & Wolff's parent company sold 185 acres of surplus shipyard land and buildings to Harcourt Developments for £47 million. This is now known as the Titanic Quarter, and includes the £97 million Titanic Belfast visitor attraction.

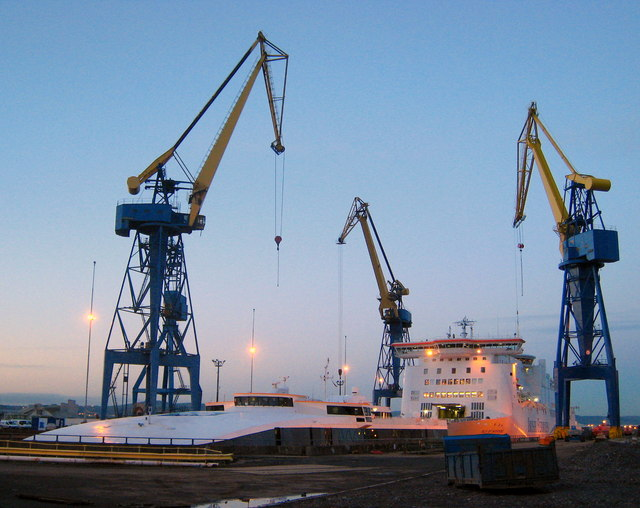
Isle of Inishmore and Jonathan Swift during refit at Harland & Wolff in 2008

In recent years the company has seen its ship-related workload increase. While Harland & Wolff has had no recent involvement in shipbuilding projects, the company is increasingly involved in overhaul, re-fitting and ship repair, as well as the construction and repair of off-shore equipment such as oil platforms. On 1 February 2011 it was announced that Harland & Wolff had won the contract to refurbish SS Nomadic, effectively rekindling its nearly 150-year association with the White Star Line. Structural steel work on the ship began on 10 February 2011 and was completed in time for the 2012 Belfast Titanic Festival. In July 2012 Harland & Wolff was to carry out the dry docking and service of the Husky Oil SeaRose FPSO (Floating Production, Storage and Offloading) vessel.

Harland & Wolff's twin gantry cranes, Samson and Goliath, built in 1974 and 1969 respectively, are a feature of Belfast's skyline. In late 2007, the 'Goliath' crane was re-commissioned, having been mothballed in 2003 due to the lack of heavy-lifting work at the yard.

In June 2008, assembly work at the Belfast yard was underway on 60 Vestas V90-3MW wind turbines for the Robin Rigg Wind Farm. This was the second offshore wind farm assembled by the company for Vestas having completed the logistics for the Barrow Offshore Wind Farm in 2006. In August 2011 Harland & Wolff completed the logistics for the Ormonde Wind Farm which consisted of 30 REpower 5MW turbines.

In March 2008, the construction of the world's first commercial tidal stream turbine, for Marine Current Turbines, was completed at the Belfast yard. The installation of the 1.2MW SeaGen Tidal System was begun in Strangford Lough in April 2008.

In July 2010, Harland & Wolff secured a contract to make a prototype tidal energy turbine for Scotrenewables Ltd. Manufacture of the SR250 device was completed in May 2011 and has been undergoing testing in Orkney since.

Since April 2012, the booming offshore wind power industry has taken centre stage. Harland & Wolff had been working on three innovative meteorological mast foundations for the Dogger Bank and Firth of Forth offshore wind farms, as well as putting the finishing touches to two Siemens substations for the Gwynt y Môr offshore wind farm. Seventy-five per cent of the company's work was based on offshore renewable energy. Harland & Wolff was one of many UK and international companies profiting from the emergence of UK wind- and marine-generated electricity, which had been attracting significant inward investment. As the business environment became increasingly competitive the yard began to have difficulty in generating enough business to meet overhead expenses. The yard was last profitable in 2015 and the following year it had an operating loss of £6 million.

In 2018, the parent company Fred. Olsen & Co. restructured and decided to place Harland & Wolff up for sale. No buyer emerged and on 5 August 2019 the company announced that they would cease trading and entered formal administration.

Subsequently, on 1 October 2019, it was announced that the shipyard had been bought for £6 million by the London-based energy firm, InfraStrata.

In August 2020, InfraStrata also bought the dormant Appledore shipyard for £7 million. The deal will see the shipyard renamed H&W Appledore complementing the H&W Belfast shipyard by focusing on smaller ships of up to 119 metres in the shipbuilding and ship repair market.

In February 2021, InfraStrata acquired two BiFab yards, the £850,000 deal was struck for the Methil and Arnish yards, (but not the Burntisland facility). These Scottish facilities will trade under the Harland & Wolff brand. In September 2021, Infrastrata plc was renamed Harland & Wolff Group Holdings plc.

In April 2023, the Belfast yard completed its first new vessel since Anvil Point in 2003. It is a barge for the waste management company, Cory, the first of an order for 23 such craft. From 2025 the yard is expecting to construct three new solid stores replenishment vessels for the Royal Fleet Auxiliary as part of the Team Resolute Consortium.

On 16 September 2024, it was reported that Harland & Wolff entered administration for the second time in 5 years. The company was expected to continue operations normally, with its non-core operations winding down and up to 60 jobs being lost. On 19 December 2024, it was announced that the Spanish state-owned shipbuilding company Navantia had agreed to buy Harland & Wolff's four shipyards and retain all employees.

In January 2025, it was announced that Navantia had completed its purchase of the British company.

== Archives ==
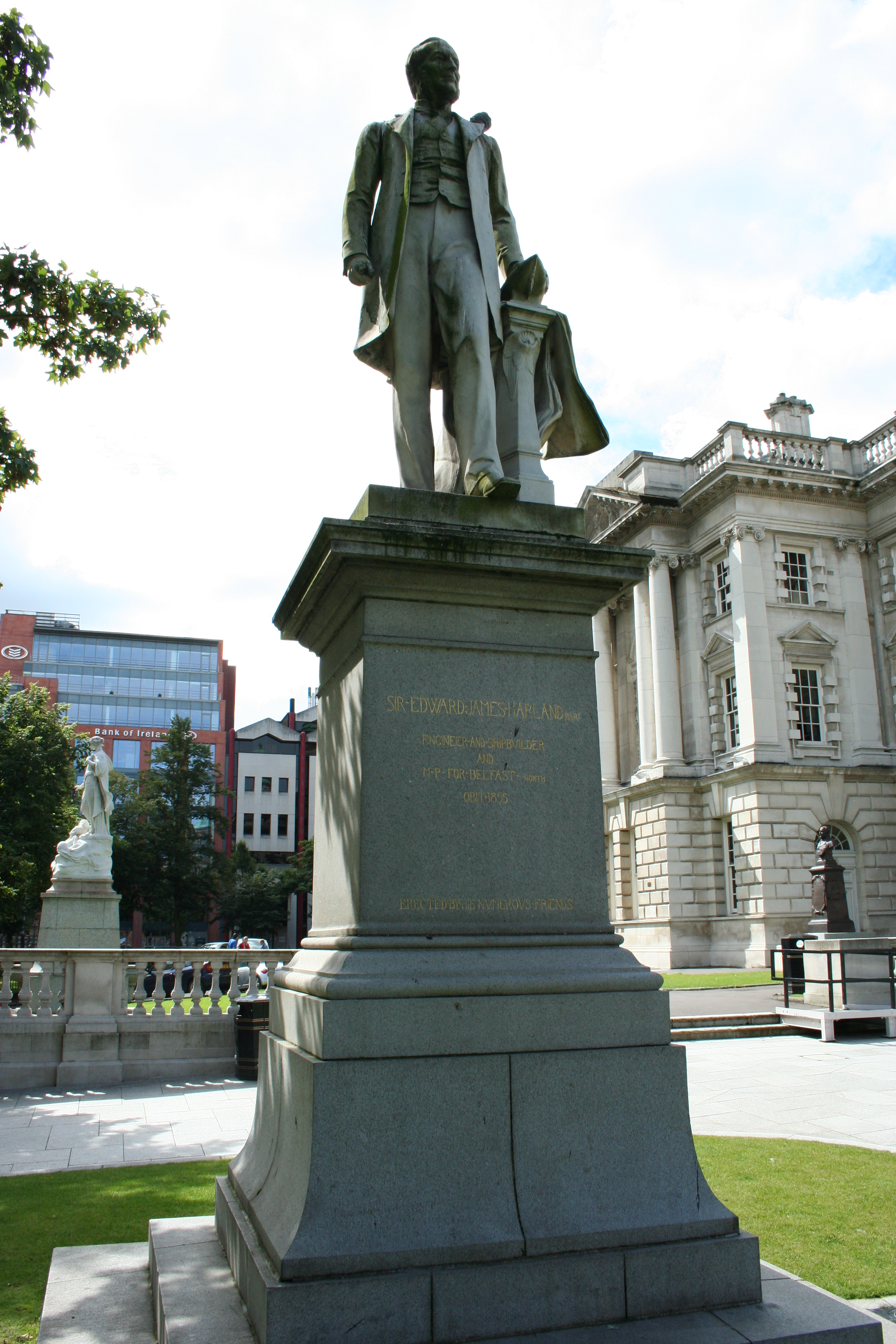
Statue of Sir Edward James Harland in the grounds of Belfast City Hall

A collection of Harland & Wolff papers are held at Public Record Office of Northern Ireland (PRONI). The Harland & Wolff archive in PRONI comprises c.2,000 files, c.200 volumes and c.16,000 documents, 1861–1987, documenting most aspects of the history of the company.

A further major archive is held at the Ulster Folk and Transport Museum (UFTM). This has a photographic collection and a ships' plans collection (i.e., technical drawings). Around 8,000 prints of Harland & Wolff-built ships covering the period 1890-1945 are held in bound volumes in the UFTM's library. However the UFTM's collection of ships' plans is not currently available to the public nor is there a copy service.

Selected early ship's plans (dating from 1860 to 1882) are reproduced in a pictorial book by McCluskie (1998). Records relating to the Govan yard of Harland & Wolff plc are maintained by the Archives of the University of Glasgow (GUAS).
