= Geddes Committee =

The Geddes Committee is the name by which the United Kingdom's Shipbuilding Inquiry Committee of 1965-1966 was more generally known. It took this name from its chairperson, Reay Geddes, the managing director of Dunlop Rubber.

The Geddes Committee was appointed in February 1965. Their remit was to consider ways to save the shipbuilding industry in the United Kingdom by achieving greater competitiveness through organisational changes and in the methods of production. The Committee was sponsored by the Board of Trade.

They started gathering evidence from the Shipbuilding Conference and Shipbuilding Employers Federation, the Chamber of Shipping, the Dry Dock Owners and Repairers Central Council, the National Association of Marine Engineers, and the Confederation of Shipbuilding and Engineering Unions.

The financial collapse of the Fairfield Shipbuilding and Engineering Company occurred in October 1965, leading to the "Fairfield Experiment".

The Geddes Committee published its report in 1966, calling for the reorganisation of UK shipbuilding into five large concerns. Harold Wilson's government accepted these recommendations and set up the Shipbuilding Industry Board (SIB) through the Shipbuilding Industry Act 1967.
