= 3rd Golden Satellite Awards =

Awards ceremony for film and television

- Date: January 17, 1999

Highlights
- Best drama film: The Thin Red Line
- Best comedy/musical film: Shakespeare in Love
- Best television drama: Oz
- Best television musical/comedy: Ellen
- Best director: Terrence Malick for The Thin Red Line

The 3rd Golden Satellite Awards, given by the International Press Academy, honored the best in film and television for 1998.

== Special achievement awards ==
Mary Pickford Award (for outstanding contribution to the entertainment industry) – Alan J. Pakula

Outstanding New Talent – Eamonn Owens

== Motion picture winners and nominees ==
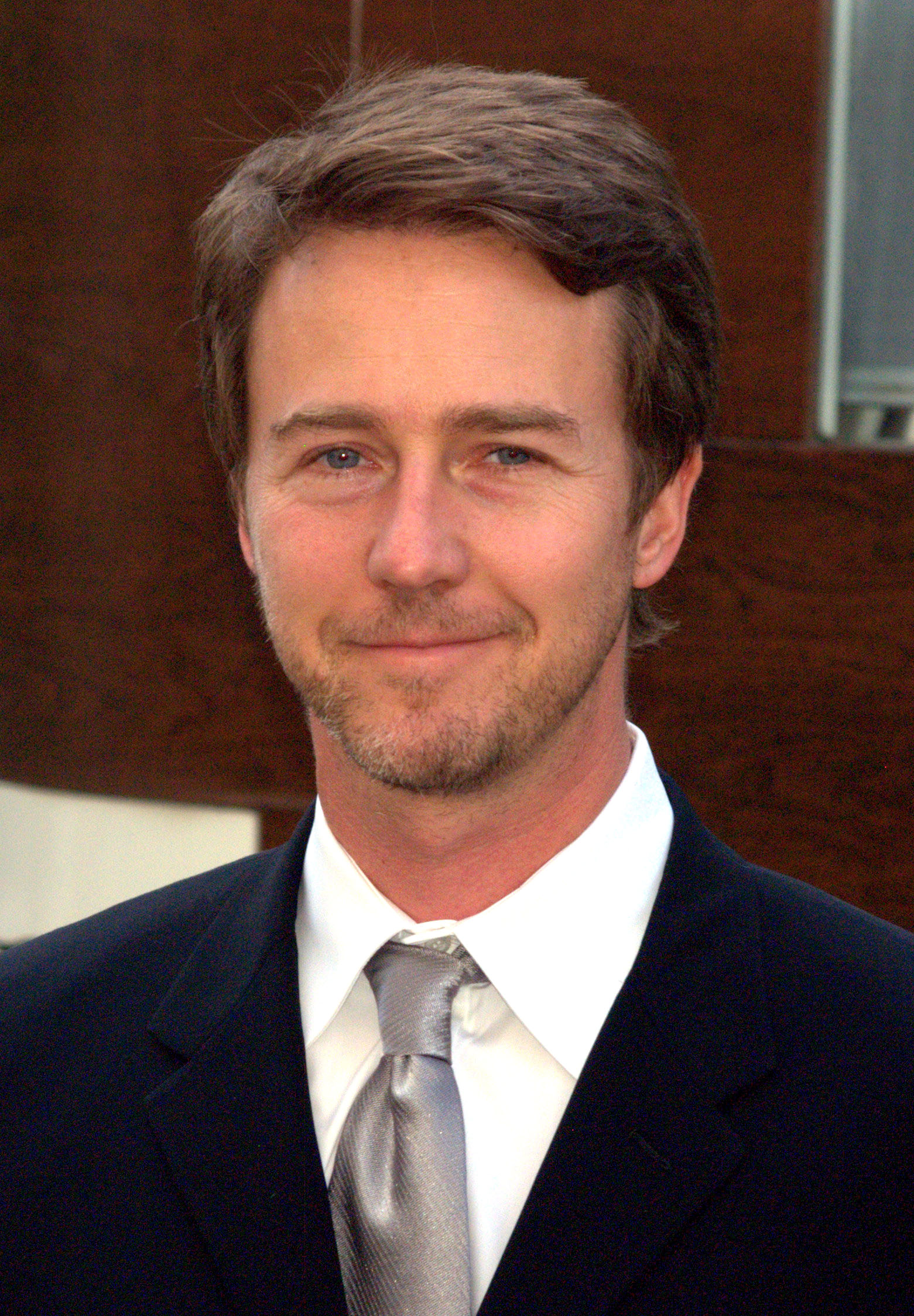
Edward Norton – Best Actor in a Motion Picture, Drama

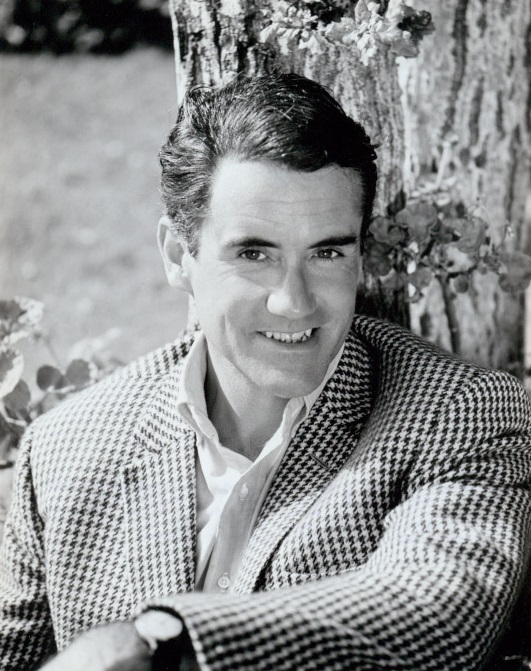
Ian Bannen – Best Actor in a Motion Picture, Comedy or Musical

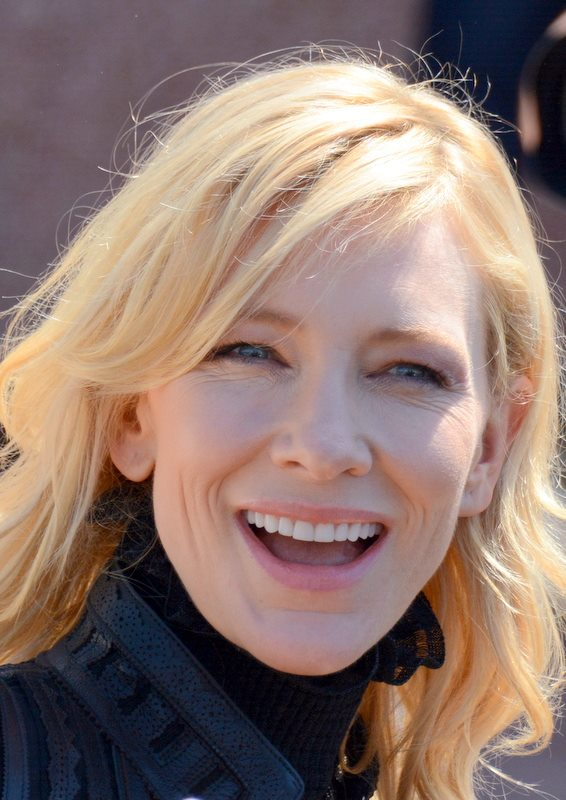
Cate Blanchett – Best Actress in a Motion Picture, Drama

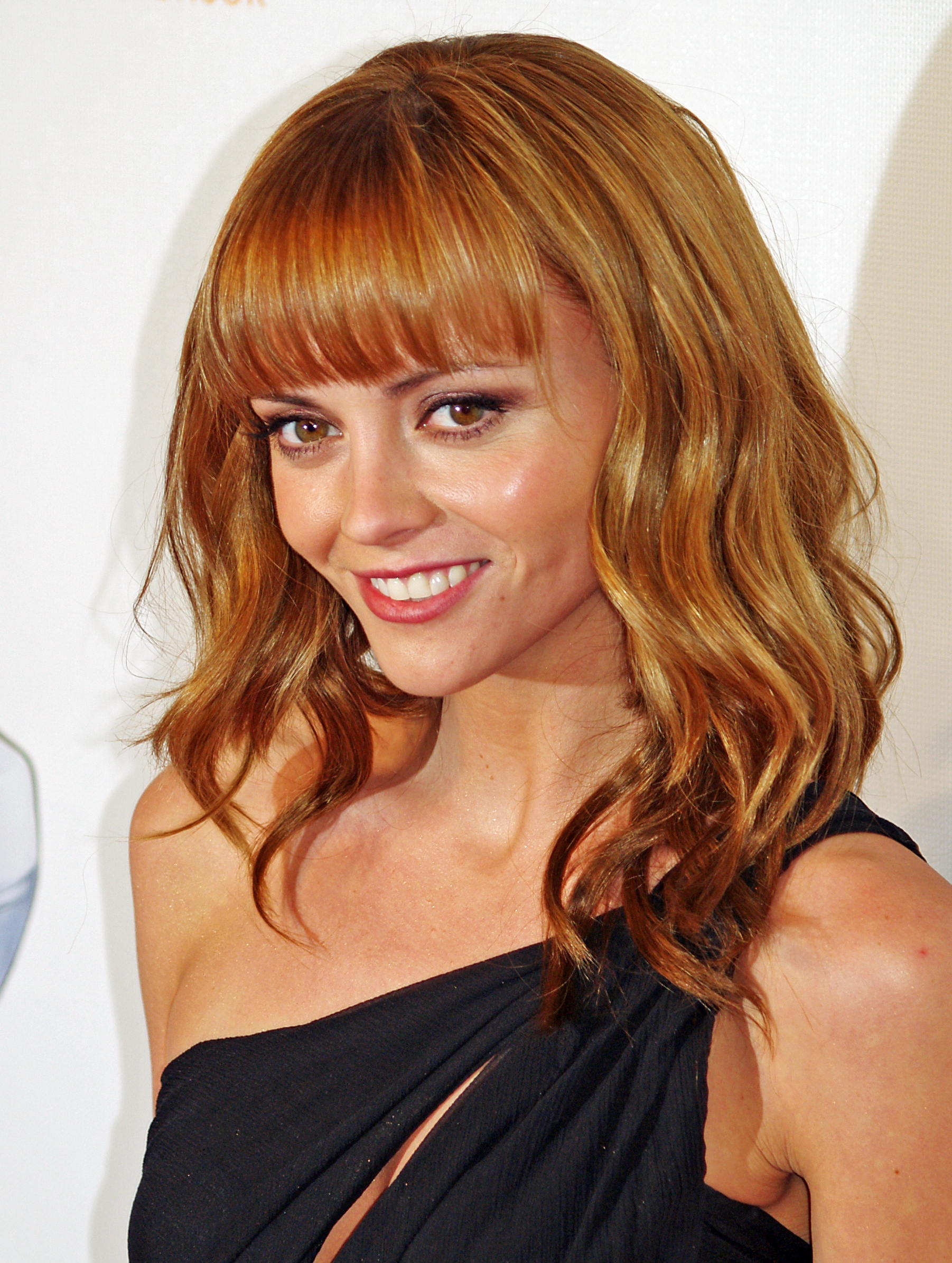
Christina Ricci – Best Actress in a Motion Picture, Comedy or Musical

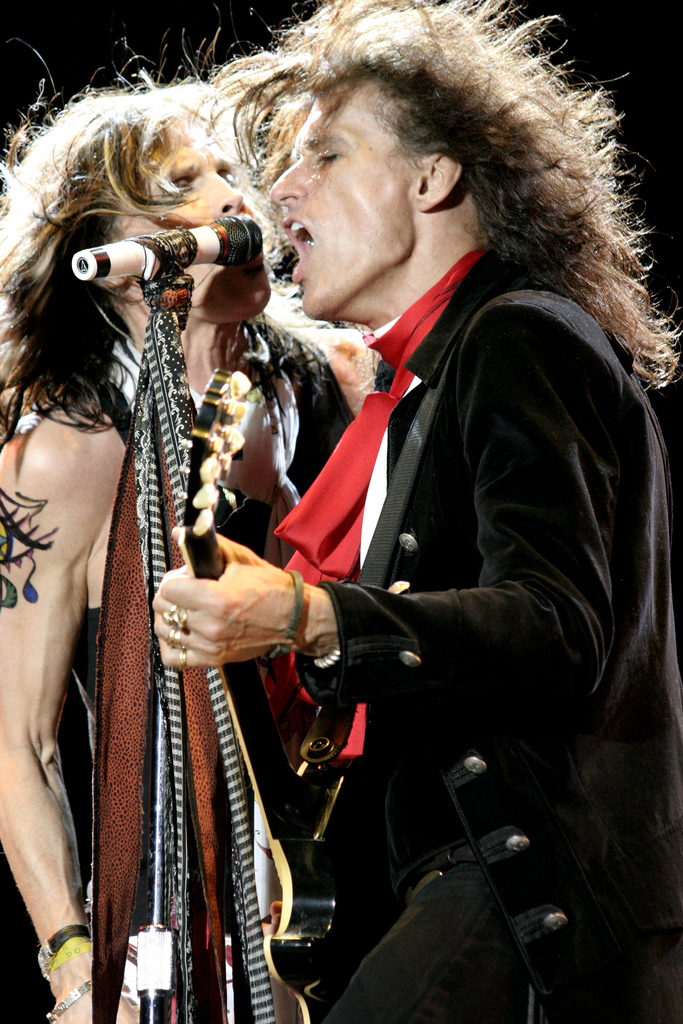
Aerosmith – Best Original Song: "I Don't Want to Miss a Thing"

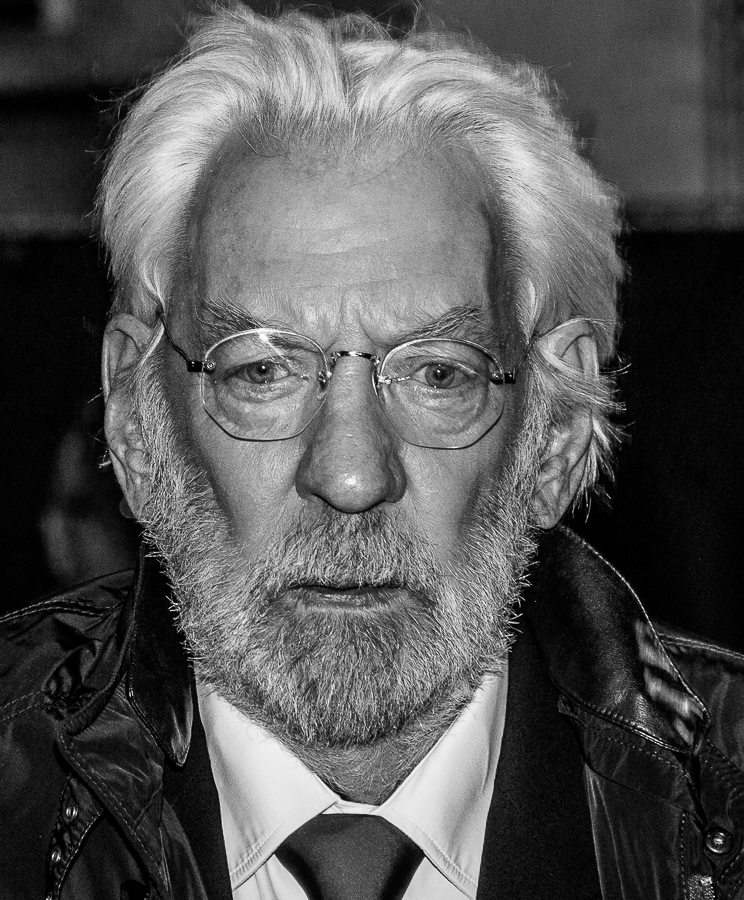
Donald Sutherland – Best Supporting Actor in a Motion Picture, Drama

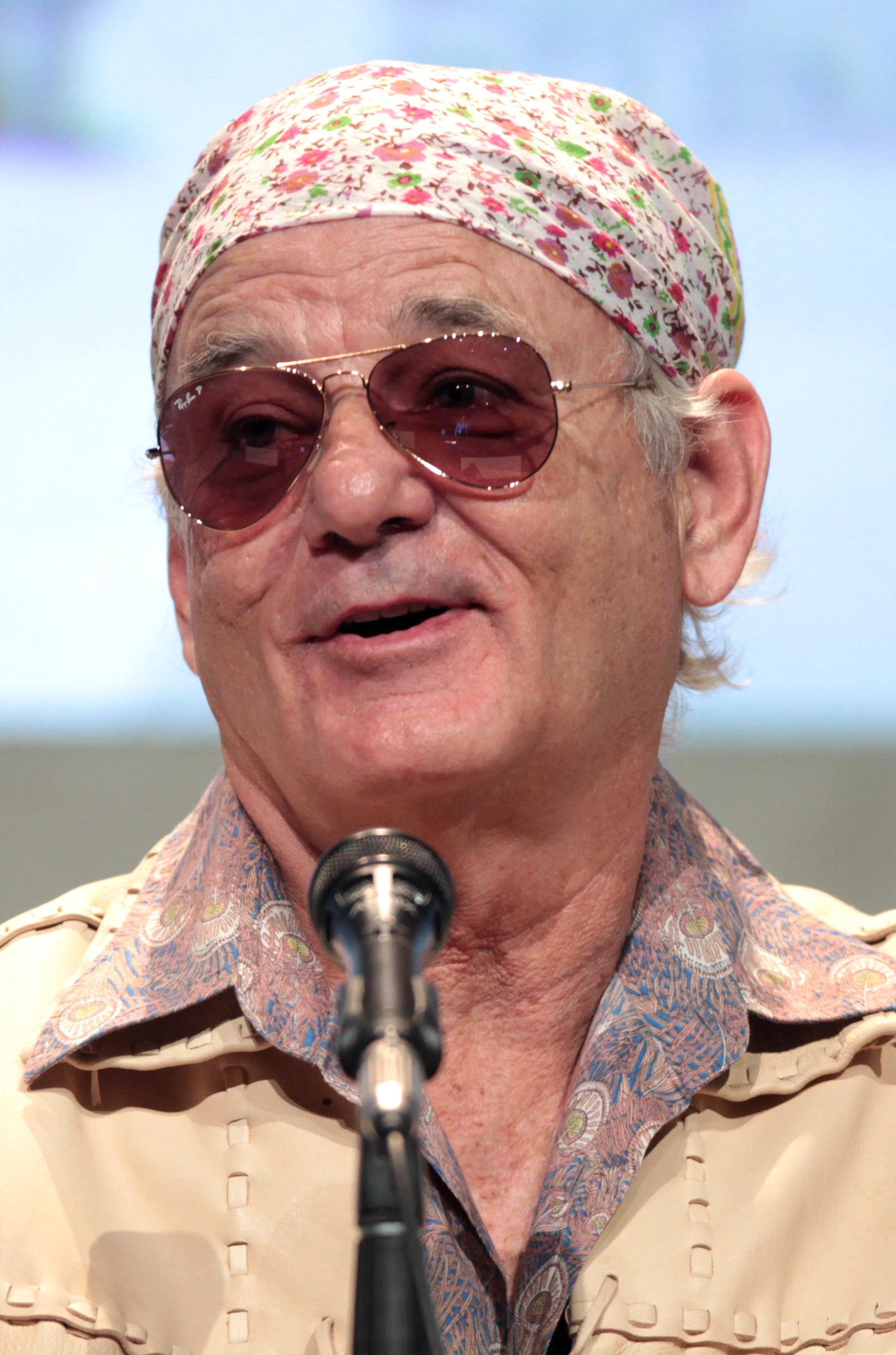
Bill Murray – Best Supporting Actor in a Motion Picture, Comedy or Musical

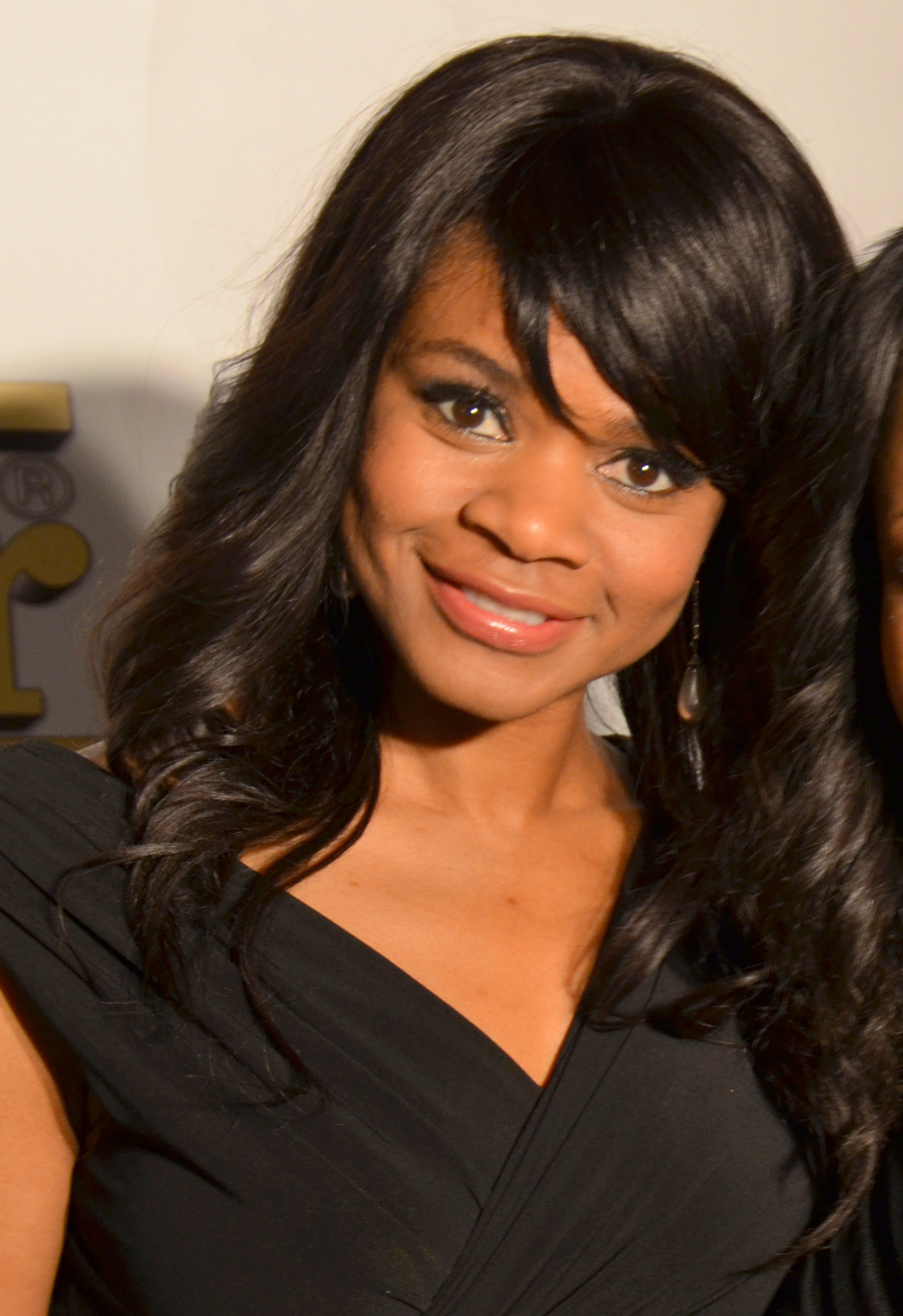
Kimberly Elise – Best Supporting Actress in a Motion Picture, Drama

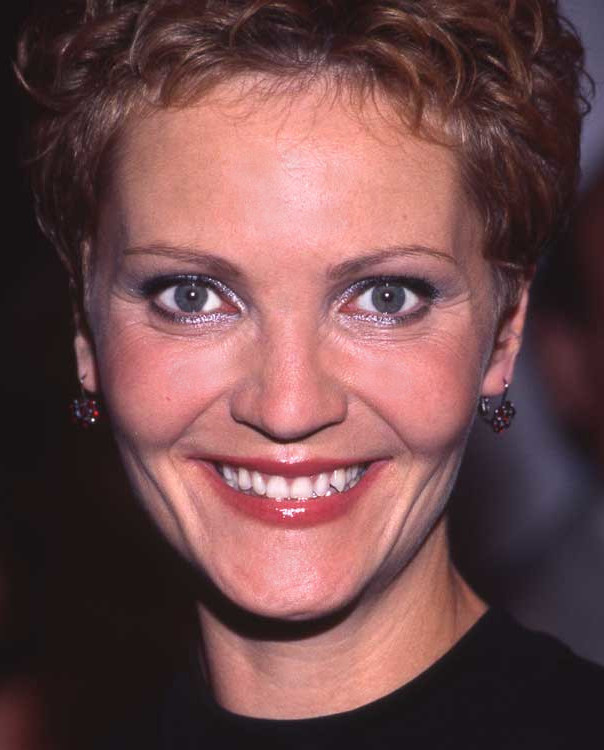
Joan Allen – Best Supporting Actress in a Motion Picture, Comedy or Musical

=== Best Actor – Drama ===
Edward Norton – American History X

- Stephen Fry – Wilde
- Brendan Gleeson – The General
- Derek Jacobi – Love Is the Devil: Study for a Portrait of Francis Bacon
- Nick Nolte – Affliction
- Ian McKellen – Gods and Monsters

=== Best Actor – Musical or Comedy ===
Ian Bannen – Waking Ned (TIE)
David Kelly – Waking Ned (TIE)

- Warren Beatty – Bulworth
- Jeff Bridges – The Big Lebowski
- Michael Caine – Little Voice
- Robin Williams – Patch Adams

=== Best Actress – Drama ===
Cate Blanchett – Elizabeth

- Helena Bonham Carter – The Theory of Flight
- Fernanda Montenegro – Central Station (Central do Brasil)
- Susan Sarandon – Stepmom
- Meryl Streep – One True Thing
- Emily Watson – Hilary and Jackie

=== Best Actress – Musical or Comedy ===
Christina Ricci – The Opposite of Sex

- Jane Horrocks – Little Voice
- Holly Hunter – Living Out Loud
- Gwyneth Paltrow – Shakespeare in Love
- Meg Ryan – You've Got Mail

=== Best Animated or Mixed Media Film ===
A Bug's Life

- Antz
- Mulan
- The Prince of Egypt
- The Rugrats Movie

=== Best Art Direction ===
The Truman Show – Dennis Gassner

- Beloved
- Elizabeth
- Pleasantville
- Shakespeare in Love

=== Best Cinematography ===
The Thin Red Line – John Toll

- Beloved
- Pleasantville
- Saving Private Ryan
- Shakespeare in Love

=== Best Costume Design ===
Elizabeth – Alexandra Byrne

- Beloved
- Ever After
- Pleasantville
- Shakespeare in Love

=== Best Director ===
Terrence Malick – The Thin Red Line

- John Boorman – The General
- Shekhar Kapur – Elizabeth
- Gary Ross – Pleasantville
- Steven Spielberg – Saving Private Ryan

=== Best Documentary Film ===
Ayn Rand: A Sense of Life

- The Cruise
- The Farm: Angola, USA
- Kurt & Courtney
- Public Housing

=== Best Editing ===
Saving Private Ryan – Michael Kahn

- Beloved
- Pleasantville
- Shakespeare in Love
- The Thin Red Line

=== Best Film – Drama ===
The Thin Red Line

- Elizabeth
- The General
- Gods and Monsters
- Saving Private Ryan

=== Best Film – Musical or Comedy ===
Shakespeare in Love

- Little Voice
- Pleasantville
- Waking Ned
- You've Got Mail

=== Best Foreign Language Film ===
Central Station (Central do Brasil), Brazil

- The Celebration (Festen), Denmark
- Life Is Beautiful (La vita è bella), Italy
- Only Clouds Move the Stars (Bare skyer beveger stjernene), Norway
- The Separation (La Séparation), France

=== Best Original Score ===
"The Thin Red Line" – Hans Zimmer

- "Beloved" – Rachel Portman
- "City of Angels" – Gabriel Yared
- "Pleasantville" – Randy Newman
- "Saving Private Ryan" – John Williams

=== Best Original Song ===
"I Don't Want to Miss a Thing" performed by Aerosmith – Armageddon

- "Anyone at All" – You've Got Mail
- "The Flame Still Burns" – Still Crazy
- "That'll Do" – Babe: Pig in the City
- "When You Believe" – The Prince of Egypt

=== Best Screenplay – Adapted ===
Gods and Monsters – Bill Condon

- Beloved – Adam Brooks, Akosua Busia and Richard LaGravenese
- Hilary and Jackie – Frank Cottrell Boyce
- Little Voice – Mark Herman
- The Thin Red Line – Terrence Malick

=== Best Screenplay – Original ===
Pleasantville – Gary Ross

- American History X – David McKenna
- Central Station (Central do Brasil) – Marcos Bernstein and João Emanuel Carneiro
- Saving Private Ryan – Robert Rodat
- Shakespeare in Love – Marc Norman and Tom Stoppard

=== Best Supporting Actor – Drama ===
Donald Sutherland – Without Limits

- Robert Duvall – A Civil Action
- Jason Patric – Your Friends & Neighbors
- Tom Sizemore – Saving Private Ryan
- Billy Bob Thornton – A Simple Plan

=== Best Supporting Actor – Musical or Comedy ===
Bill Murray – Rushmore

- Jeff Daniels – Pleasantville
- John Goodman – The Big Lebowski
- Bill Nighy – Still Crazy
- Geoffrey Rush – Shakespeare in Love

=== Best Supporting Actress – Drama ===
Kimberly Elise – Beloved

- Kathy Burke – Dancing at Lughnasa
- Beverly D'Angelo – American History X
- Thandie Newton – Beloved
- Lynn Redgrave – Gods and Monsters

=== Best Supporting Actress – Musical or Comedy ===
Joan Allen – Pleasantville

- Kathy Bates – Primary Colors
- Brenda Blethyn – Little Voice
- Julianne Moore – The Big Lebowski
- Joan Plowright – Dance with Me

=== Best Visual Effects ===
What Dreams May Come – Ellen Somers

- Armageddon
- Babe: Pig in the City
- Saving Private Ryan
- Star Trek: Insurrection

=== Outstanding Motion Picture Ensemble ===
The Thin Red Line

== Television winners and nominees ==
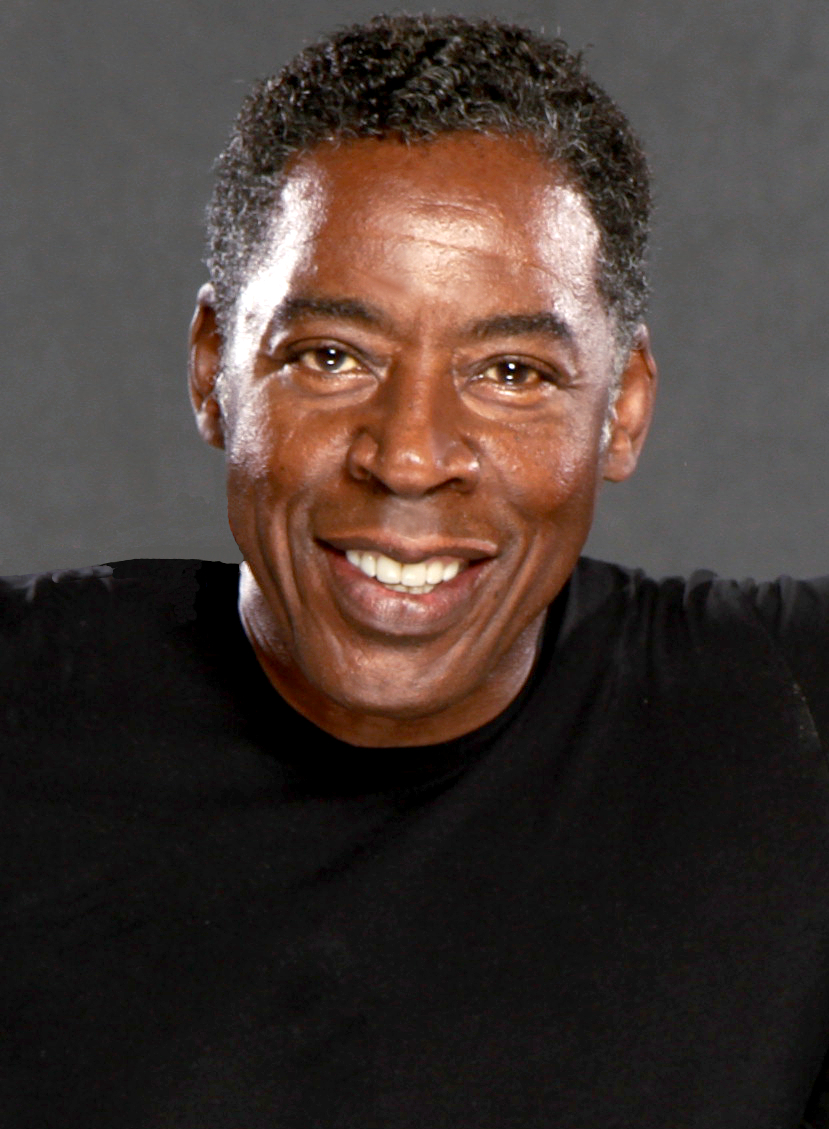
Ernie Hudson – Best Actor in a Series, Drama

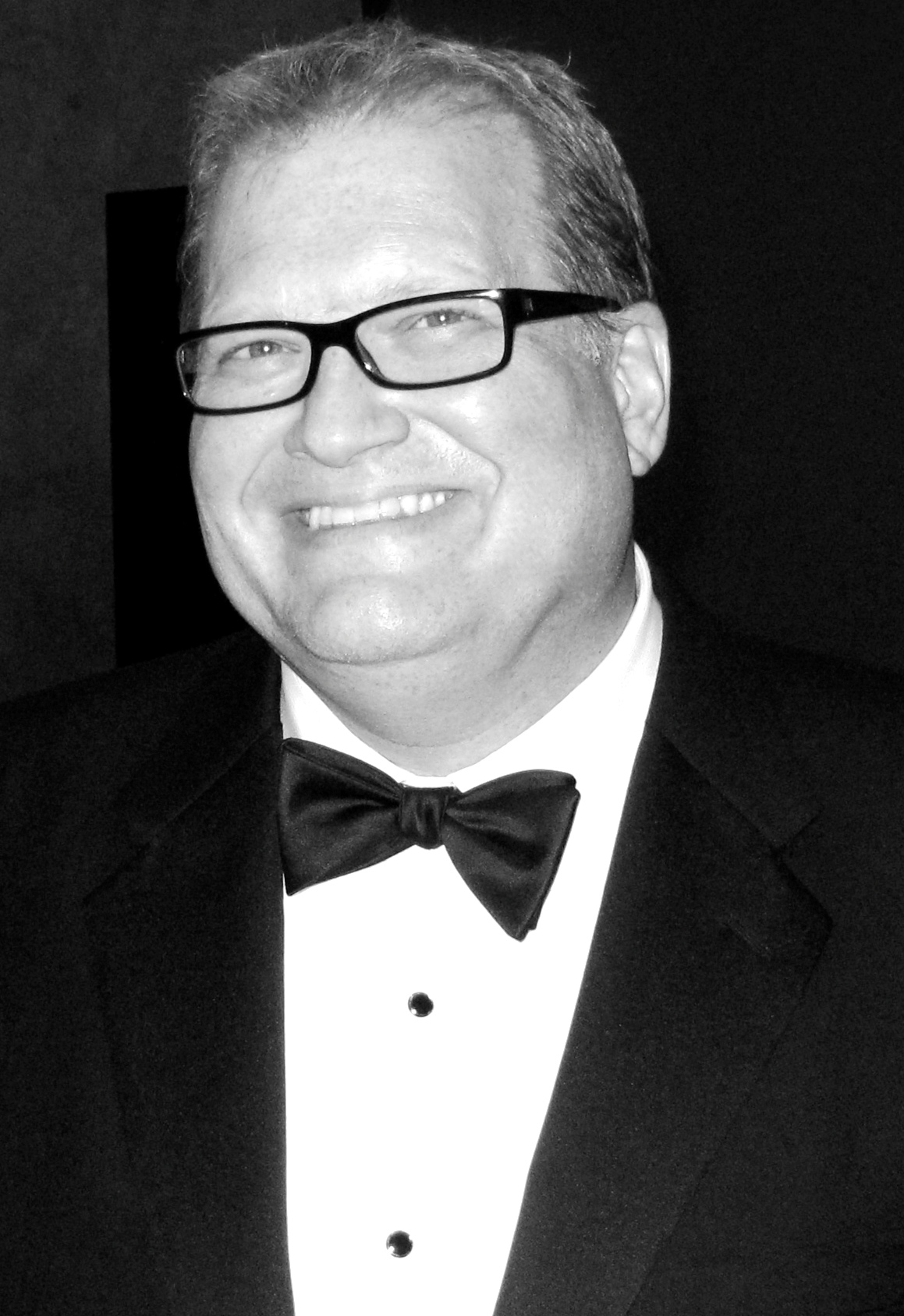
Drew Carey – Best Actor in a Series, Comedy or Musical

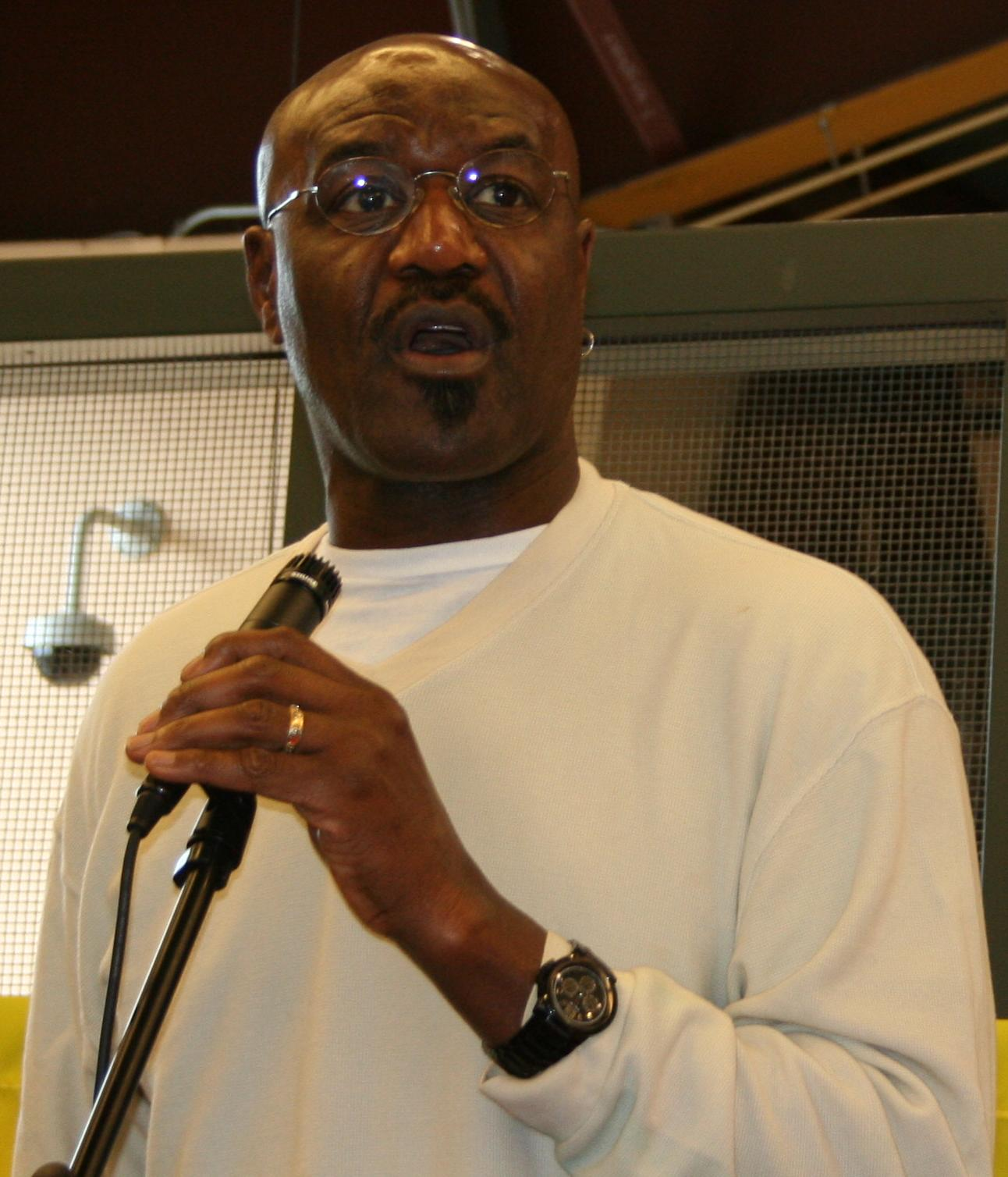
Delroy Lindo – Best Actor in a Miniseries or Television Film

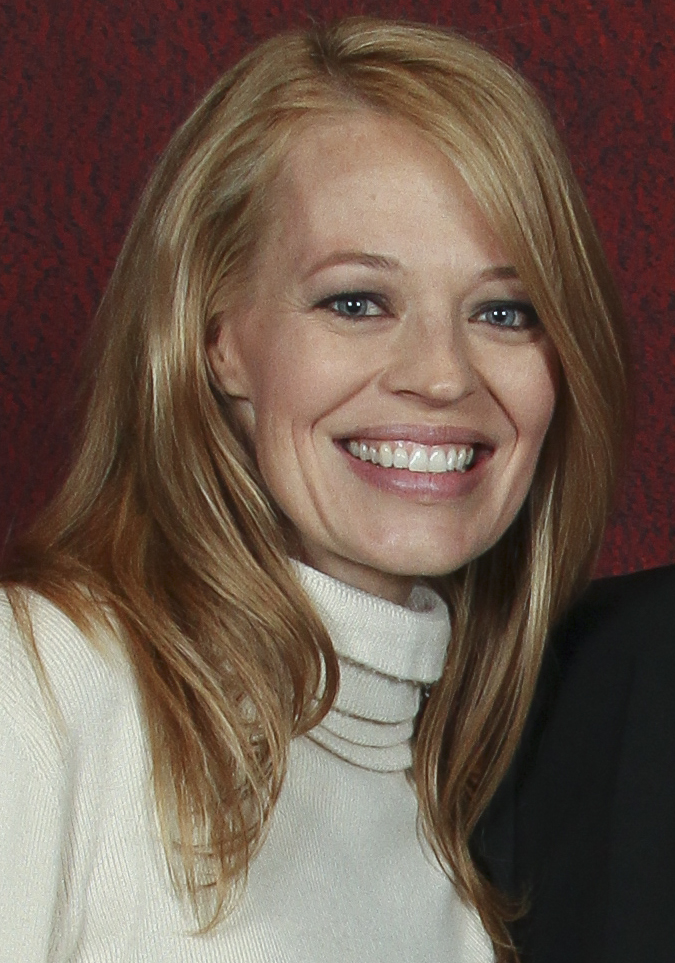
Jeri Ryan – Best Actress in a Series, Drama

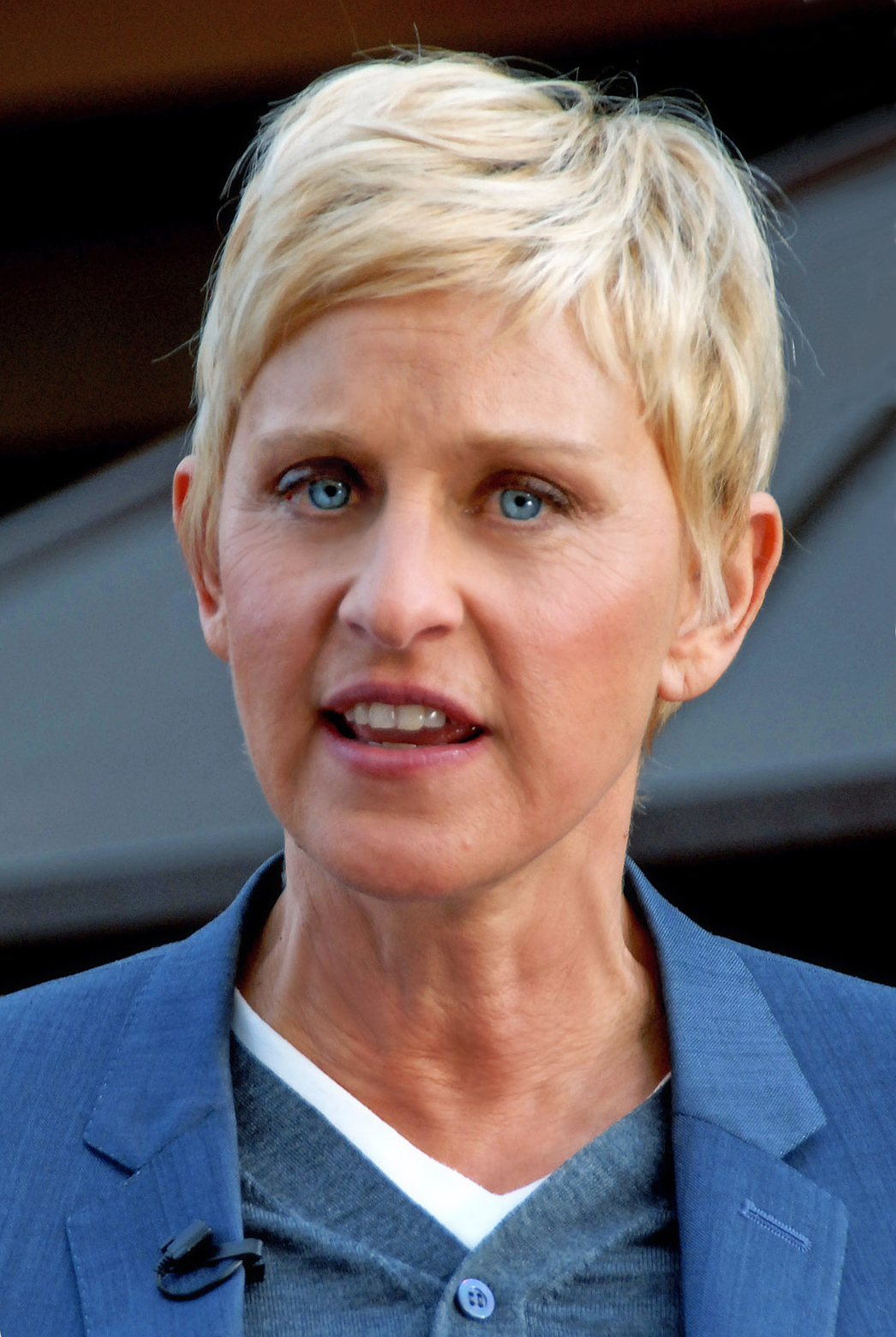
Ellen DeGeneres – Best Actress in a Series, Comedy or Musical

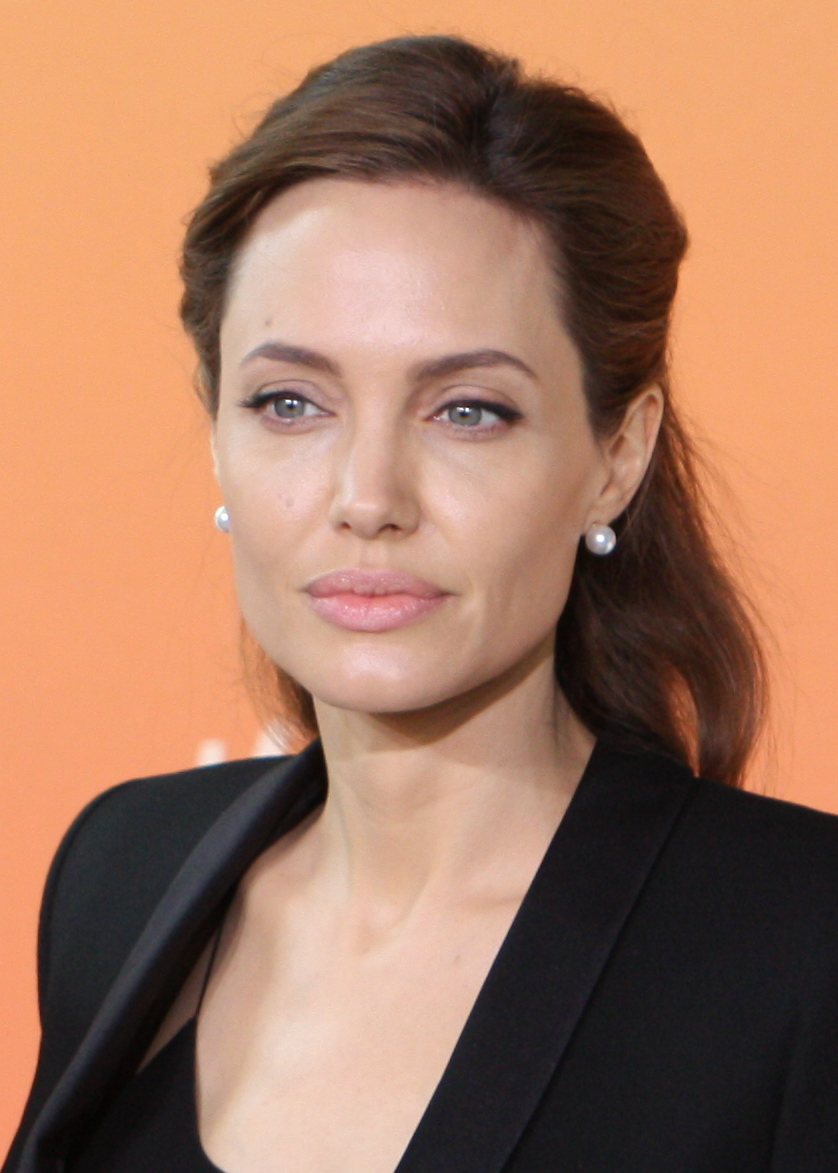
Angelina Jolie – Best Actress in a Miniseries or Television Film

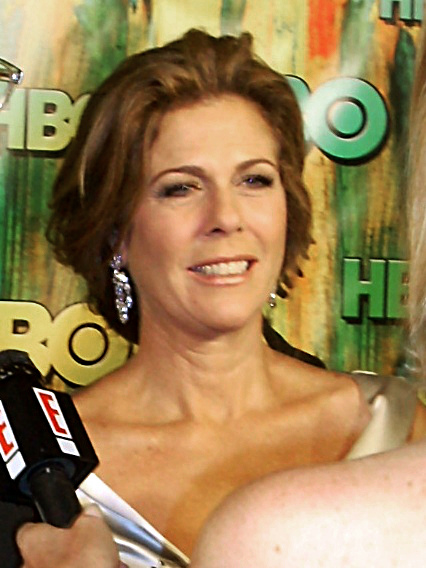
Rita Wilson – Best Supporting Actress in a Series, Miniseries or Television Film

=== Best Actor – Drama Series ===
Ernie Hudson – Oz

- George Clooney – ER
- Dylan McDermott – The Practice
- Jimmy Smits – NYPD Blue
- Michael T. Weiss – The Pretender

=== Best Actor – Musical or Comedy Series ===
Drew Carey – The Drew Carey Show

- Michael J. Fox – Spin City
- Kelsey Grammer – Frasier
- John Lithgow – 3rd Rock from the Sun
- Paul Reiser – Mad About You

=== Best Actor – Miniseries or TV Film ===
Delroy Lindo – Glory & Honor

- Cary Elwes – The Pentagon Wars
- Laurence Fishburne – Always Outnumbered
- Kevin Pollak – From the Earth to the Moon
- Patrick Stewart – Moby Dick

=== Best Actress – Drama Series ===
Jeri Ryan – Star Trek: Voyager

- Gillian Anderson – The X-Files
- Sharon Lawrence – NYPD Blue
- Rita Moreno – Oz
- Andrea Parker – The Pretender

=== Best Actress – Musical or Comedy Series ===
Ellen DeGeneres – Ellen

- Calista Flockhart – Ally McBeal
- Helen Hunt – Mad About You
- Phylicia Rashad – Cosby
- Brooke Shields – Suddenly Susan

=== Best Actress – Miniseries or TV Film ===
Angelina Jolie – Gia

- Olympia Dukakis – More Tales of the City
- Mia Farrow – Miracle at Midnight
- Barbara Hershey – The Staircase
- Jennifer Jason Leigh – Thanks of a Grateful Nation

=== Best Miniseries or TV Film ===
From the Earth to the Moon

- A Bright Shining Lie
- Gia
- More Tales of the City
- Thanks of a Grateful Nation

=== Best Series – Drama ===
Oz

- ER
- NYPD Blue
- The Pretender
- The X-Files

=== Best Series – Musical or Comedy ===
Ellen

- 3rd Rock from the Sun
- Frasier
- Mad About You
- Suddenly Susan

=== Best Supporting Actor – (Mini)Series or TV Film ===
David Clennon – From the Earth to the Moon

- Brian Dennehy – Thanks of a Grateful Nation
- Lance Henriksen – The Day Lincoln Was Shot
- Martin Short – Merlin
- Daniel Williams – Always Outnumbered

=== Best Supporting Actress – (Mini)Series or TV Film ===
Rita Wilson – From the Earth to the Moon

- Jackie Burroughs – More Tales of the City
- Faye Dunaway – Gia
- Shirley Knight – The Wedding
- Amy Madigan – A Bright Shining Lie

== New Media winners and nominees ==
=== Best Home Entertainment Product/Game ===
Dilbert's Desktop Games

- Gran Turismo
- Half-Life
- Madden NFL 99
- NBA Live 99

=== CD-ROM Entertainment ===
Big Brother

- Baldur's Gate
- Heretic II
- Rainbow Six
- Unreal

== Awards breakdown ==
=== Film ===
Winners:

5 / 7 The Thin Red Line: Best Cinematography / Best Director / Best Film – Drama / Best Original Score & Outstanding Motion Picture Ensemble
2 / 3 Waking Ned: Best Actor – Musical or Comedy (2x)
2 / 5 Elizabeth: Best Actress – Drama / Best Costume Design
2 / 10 Pleasantville: Best Screenplay – Original / Best Supporting Actress – Musical or Comedy
1 / 1 A Bug's Life: Best Animated or Mixed Media Film
1 / 1 Ayn Rand: A Sense of Life: Best Documentary Film
1 / 1 The Opposite of Sex: Best Actress – Musical or Comedy
1 / 1 Rushmore: Best Supporting Actor – Musical or Comedy
1 / 1 The Truman Show: Best Art Direction
1 / 1 What Dreams May Come: Best Visual Effects
1 / 1 Without Limits: Best Supporting Actor – Drama
1 / 2 Armageddon: Best Original Song
1 / 3 American History X: Best Actor – Drama
1 / 3 Central Station (Central do Brasil): Best Foreign Language Film
1 / 4 Gods and Monsters: Best Screenplay – Adapted
1 / 8 Beloved: Best Supporting Actress – Drama
1 / 8 Saving Private Ryan: Best Editing
1 / 8 Shakespeare in Love: Best Film – Musical or Comedy

Losers:

0 / 5 Little Voice
0 / 3 The Big Lebowski, The General, You've Got Mail
0 / 2 Babe: Pig in the City, Hilary and Jackie, The Prince of Egypt

=== Television ===
Winners:

3 / 4 From the Earth to the Moon: Best Miniseries or TV Film / Best Supporting Actor & Actress – (Mini)Series or TV Film
2 / 2 Ellen: Best Actress – Musical or Comedy Series / Best Series – Musical or Comedy
2 / 3 Oz: Best Actor – Drama Series / Best Series – Drama
1 / 1 The Drew Carey Show: Best Actor – Musical or Comedy Series
1 / 1 Glory & Honor: Best Actor – Miniseries or TV Film
1 / 1 Star Trek: Voyager: Best Actress – Drama Series
1 / 3 Gia: Best Actress – Miniseries or TV Film

Losers:

0 / 3 Mad About You, More Tales of the City, NYPD Blue, The Pretender, Thanks of a Grateful Nation
0 / 2 3rd Rock from the Sun, A Bright Shining Lie, Always Outnumbered, ER, Frasier, Suddenly Susan, The X-Files
