= E-Ring =

America television series

- Genre: Military drama
- Created by: Ken Robinson; David McKenna
- Starring: Benjamin Bratt; Dennis Hopper; Aunjanue Ellis; Kerr Smith; Kelly Rutherford
- Composer: Trevor Morris
- Country of origin: United States
- Original language: English
- No. of seasons: 1
- No. of episodes: 22 (8 unaired in the U.S.)

Production
- Executive producers: Jonathan Littman; David McKenna; Kenneth Biller; Jerry Bruckheimer
- Producers: David Barrett; Erik Oleson; Paul Moen; Ken Robinson
- Running time: 42–44 minutes
- Production companies: Jerry Bruckheimer Television; Warner Bros. Television

Original release
- Network: NBC
- Release: September 21, 2005 – February 1, 2006

E-Ring is an American military drama television series created by Ken Robinson and David McKenna and executive produced by Jerry Bruckheimer, that premiered on NBC on September 21, 2005, and aired through February 1, 2006. The series stars Benjamin Bratt, Dennis Hopper, Aunjanue Ellis, Kerr Smith and Kelly Rutherford and was produced by Jerry Bruckheimer Television and Warner Bros. Television.

== Series overview ==
The title of the show refers to the structure of The Pentagon, which is configured in five concentric rings, from "A" to "E", with E being the outermost ring. Before any military action can be taken anywhere in the world, the mission must be planned and approved by the most important ring of the Pentagon, the E-ring. This is where the more high-profile work is done, all operations must be legally approved and the green light given by the Joint Chiefs of Staff. The show starred Benjamin Bratt as Major James Tisnewski, a former Delta Force operator and Dennis Hopper as Colonel Eli McNulty, as officers working in the E-ring of the Pentagon in the Special Operations Division (SOD) – planning and co-ordinating covert US special operations actions around the globe.

The show struggled from the onset because it was up against ABC's Top 20 hit Lost, CBS's Top 30 hit Criminal Minds, FOX's Top 10 hit American Idol and the network's other Top 30 hit Unan1mous. Although NBC gave it an earlier time slot which led to better ratings, the show was pulled from the lineup during the February sweeps and officially canceled at the NBC upfront on May 15.

== Cast ==
- Benjamin Bratt – Major James "JT" Tisnewski, a former Army Ranger and a Delta Force operator reassigned to the Joint Staff's Special Operations Division after 14 months in the Middle East. Four years prior to the series, he was an Operational Detachments-A Captain (as seen in "Cemetery Wind"). He was promoted to lieutenant colonel in "The General" and was assigned as the SOD Liaison to Delta Force.

In "Acceptable Losses" (the series finale), after taking down a Mexican drug cartel leader who'd allegedly smuggled Al Qaeda operatives across the border on US soil, LTC Tisnewski was arrested and was last seen in pre-trial confinement at the United States Disciplinary Barracks in Fort Leavenworth, Kansas.

- Dennis Hopper – Colonel Eli McNulty, the principal staff officer of the Special Operations Division. A Vietnam War veteran and former prisoner of war with two Silver Stars, COL McNulty is still sometimes a little old-fashioned when it comes to dealing with female personnel.

In "Acceptable Losses" (the series finale), COL McNulty tendered his resignation after it was publicly revealed that the US Army used FISA warrants to spy on American citizens who had extremely loose or tangential ties to terrorists.

- Aunjanue Ellis – Master Sergeant Jocelyn Pierce, USMC, a career Pentagon non-commissioned officer who has worked as COL McNulty's aide for two years. She is a widow; her husband Danny was killed in action.
- Kerr Smith – Captain Bobby Wilkerson, JT's former second-in-command who is now a Delta Force team leader. He is married with two kids, but is rarely ever home due to his job.
- Kelly Rutherford – Samantha "Sonny" Liston, the Deputy General Counsel of the Department of Defense, with whom MAJ Tisnewski has a past with. She was later appointed the Assistant Secretary of Defense for Special Operations after the resignation of Assistant Secretary Algazi.

=== Recurring cast ===
- Joe Morton – Steven Algazi, the Assistant Secretary of Defense for Special Operations who resigned after MAJ Tisnewski and his team stopped a terrorist attack at the Pentagon station. He is a Marine veteran. (9 episodes)
- Maurice Compte – Sergeant First Class Charlie Gutierrez, one of JT's teammates. (9 episodes)
- Tavis Bohlinger – Mark "Doc" Jones (8 episodes)
- Kelsey Oldershaw – Angie Aronson, MAJ Tisnewski's girlfriend and a CIA operative. (7 episodes)
- Ashley Williams – Beth Wilkerson, Bobby's wife. (6 episodes)
- Mitch Morris – Ken Watkins (5 episodes)
- Andrew McCarthy – Aaron Gerrity, the Assistant Secretary of Defense for International Security Affairs with aspirations of higher office. (5 episodes)
- Brittany Ishibashi – Ashley Nakahino (5 episodes)
- Robert Picardo - Larry Kincaid, a reporter who has been working at the Pentagon for over 20 years. He was paralyzed during his time as a war correspondent during the Vietnam War. (4 episodes)
- Jaime Ray Newman – Nathalie Hughes, the daughter of General Hughes, the Commanding Officer of United States Special Operations Command, who begins a fellowship in Assistant Secretary of Defense Samantha Liston's office and a relationship with LTC Tisnewski. (4 episodes)

== Episodes ==
No.	Title	Directed by	Written by	Original release date	Prod. code
1	"Pilot"	Taylor Hackford	David McKenna & Ken Robinson	September 21, 2005	2T6750
Colonel McNulty finds himself at odds with Major James Tisnewski (JT). The major must convince his superiors at the Pentagon and the Joint Chiefs of Staff that the United States should risk war with China to extract a Chinese national spying for the United States.
2	"Snatch and Grab"	David Barrett	Story by : David McKenna & Ken Robinson; Teleplay by : David McKenna	September 28, 2005	2T6751
McNulty and his staff must act quickly to keep a terrorist ally from slipping away. The high-risk mission requires the best of the special-ops teams, and JT must send his old unit into harm's way. A wounded soldier and a captured terrorist are retrieved with the Fulton surface-to-air recovery system.
3	"Escape and Evade"	Michael Robison	Erik Oleson	October 5, 2005	2T6754
McNulty sends JT on a mission to Iraq to investigate unauthorized covert action and accusations the United States is illegally treading on Iranian soil. He winds up wounded and on the run. Sonny and Algazi must assemble a team to rescue JT from Iran.
4	"Tribes"	Fred Keller	Story by : David Gerken; Teleplay by : Karen Hall	October 12, 2005	2T6752
Africa is experiencing another threat of genocide reminiscent of Rwanda and JT enlists a bureaucrat to help out before time runs out.
5	"Weekend Pass"	Jesús Salvador Treviño	Laurie Arent	October 19, 2005	2T6753
Two US Marines are accused of raping a young local woman in Suriname. JT immediately jumps to action only to find opposition from senior staff. The United States does not want to jeopardize aluminum interests controlled by the Surinamese government. He must navigate the political maze to discern the truth and try to save the soldiers' lives.
6	"Toy Soldiers"	John Showalter	Kenneth Biller & David Gerken	October 26, 2005	2T6755
JT challenges his superiors' reasons for unexpectedly placing a known terrorist on the capture/kill list and learns that politics in the Pentagon can be deadly.
7	"Cemetery Wind (Part 1)"	Tim Matheson	Story by : David McKenna & Ken Robinson; Teleplay by : David McKenna	November 2, 2005	2T6757
JT's girlfriend Angie is put in a dangerous situation, and JT must recall his old Special Ops missions and follow the clue she left for him.
8	"Cemetery Wind (Part 2)"	David Barrett	Story by : David McKenna & Ken Robinson; Teleplay by : Kenneth Biller & David McKenna	November 9, 2005	2T6758
In Colombia, JT risks exposing an undercover operation against a murderous drug lord to discover who attacked Angie. Now, he has to finish a job they started together years ago.
9	"Delta Does Detroit"	Perry Lang	Erik Oleson	November 16, 2005	2T6759
JT and a Special Ops team are sent to Detroit to address a situation with a radical Christian group that has taken hostages inside a mosque. JT must address legal concerns around the action due to FBI jurisdiction.
10	"The Forgotten"	Dean White	Michael Ostrowski	November 23, 2005	2T6756
McNulty discovers that a captured Navy Seal could be alive in the Philippines. When attempts to save the man faces resistance from the Pentagon brass, he and JT discuss a "backdoor" mission to save the soldier. Some of McNulty's mysterious past is revealed.
11	"Christmas Story"	Alex Zakrzewski	Cinque Henderson	December 7, 2005	2T6760
On Christmas Eve, JT works on a humanitarian aid mission for an Afghanistan village that helped Delta team several years ago. He finds the village confronting bad weather and an advancing Taliban force. Also, Sonny helps JT's father who needs a favor.
12	"Breath of Allah"	Deran Sarafian	Scott Reynolds	January 11, 2006	2T6761
When an interagency strike in Amsterdam turns up an illegal lab producing the Plague, JT and his SOD team rush an anti-terrorism plan into effect, only to realize that the threat is much, much closer to home. Samantha finds herself with an enticing job offer, further complicating her relationship with JT.
13	"War Crimes"	Gloria Muzio	Lauren Gussis	January 18, 2006	2T6762
JT and his team of Special Ops soldiers put themselves in harm's way to help investigate war criminals in Sarajevo. Things heat up when the attorney they are guarding is suddenly poisoned.
14	"The General"	David Barrett	David McKenna	February 1, 2006	2T6763
JT is celebrating his promotion to lieutenant colonel when he and the Special Ops team receive word that a general officer is kidnapped in Spain. He and his team must travel the globe to track down the people responsible and before the terrorists' deadline. (Kerr Smith is promoted to series regular, and this is the last episode to air on NBC)
15	"Five Pillars"	Craig R. Baxley	Kenneth Biller & Erik Oleson	September 21, 2006 (TG4)	2T6764
A foiled Special Ops mission in Pakistan leads JT to believe there is a spy in the E-Ring. When suspicion builds around the man Sgt. Pierce is dating, she must make a difficult decision.
16	"Fallen Angels"	David Anspaugh	Larry Moskowitz	September 28, 2006 (TG4)	2T6765
The Venezuelan press claims a crashed plane was not a medical relief mission but rather a cover for a US assassination attempt against their president. JT and his team get caught in a fire fight and McNulty plots their escape from his hospital bed.
17	"Friends and Enemies"	Tawnia McKiernan	Scott Reynolds	October 5, 2006 (TG4)	2T6766
A US submarine collides with a North Korean submarine, which begins to sink. JT and his team race to rescue survivors but a few North Korean officers would rather kill their own crew.
18	"Two Princes"	Kevin Dowling	John Hlavin & Angela Russo	October 12, 2006 (TG4)	2T6767
Sent to Riyadh, Saudi Arabia to protect a crown prince, JT and Bobby become involved in a scheme to kidnap his children and bring them to the US.
19	"Brothers in Arms"	Paul Michael Glaser	David McKenna & Erik Oleson	October 19, 2006 (TG4)	2T6768
During a mission to train an elite Iraqi service unit, JT and Bobby meet a young man who becomes a soldier to defend his country and family. As the unit prepares for high-ranking visitors, including Sonny, the young soldier learns his younger brother has chosen a different path.
20	"Hard Sell"	Steve Boyum	Story by : Ken Robinson & Matthew Federman & Stephen Scaia; Teleplay by : Matthew Federman & Stephen Scaia	October 26, 2006 (TG4)	2T6769
During a psychological evaluation, JT experiences flashbacks of a traumatic mission to Lebanon to rescue a man who is being tortured by insurgents. Bobby loses his composure when a known terrorist refuses to co-operate.
21	"Isolation"	David Barrett	Lauren Gussis & Erik Oleson	November 2, 2006 (TG4)	2T6770
JT and the team travel to Mexico to apprehend a drug lord who has allied himself with Al Qaeda and is smuggling terrorists into the US.
22	"Acceptable Losses"	Kenneth Biller	Kenneth Biller & Ken Robinson	November 9, 2006 (TG4)	2T6771
After escaping capture by Mexican authorities during a dangerous covert mission, JT becomes involved in a gunfight with a drug gang and later discovers that one of the men he shot is a federal agent. The series ends on a cliffhanger.

== Broadcast ==
E-Ring aired in the United Kingdom on FX, as of July 28, 2006. They have shown all 22 episodes filmed, and have repeated the series several times since the conclusion of the original run. It is also currently (as of July 2006) shown in Kanal 5 for the Swedish market and in La Sexta for the Spanish market. On September 8, 2006, Hong Kong's ATV began showing it.

In October, E-Ring aired on Premiere (a German pay TV company) starting on October 5 synced in German language as well as the original sound. The show also aired on TVMax in (Panama) and on Rádio e Televisão de Portugal and is airing again on Fox. The show is also currently airing on the Israeli Cable channel XTRA Hot. The show was aired on Philippine cable channel Crime/Suspense. The show is also airing on SubTV (Finland). The show is also due to air on Nine HD (Australia) in April 2008. In Italy the show is due to air on Rai Due since March 21, 2008. In Croatia the show was aired on Croatian television HRT in September 2008, and again on RTL2 in September 2017. In July 2008 show started to air on Avala (Serbia).

The remaining episodes were shown on the Irish network TG4.
