= What Josiah Saw =

- Poster
- Directed by: Vincent Grashaw
- Written by: Robert Alan Dilts
- Produced by: Ran Namerode; Vincent Grashaw; Bernie Stern; Angelia Adzic
- Starring: Robert Patrick; Nick Stahl; Scott Haze; Kelli Garner; Jake Weber; Tony Hale
- Cinematography: Carlos Ritter
- Edited by: Vincent Grashaw
- Music by: Robert Pycior
- Production company: Randomix Productions
- Distributed by: Shudder
- Release dates: August 13, 2021 (Fantasia); August 4, 2022 (United States)
- Running time: 120 minutes
- Country: United States
- Language: English

What Josiah Saw is a 2021 American Southern Gothic psychological horror drama film edited and directed by Vincent Grashaw in his directorial debut. The film follows members of a damaged family before they reunite at their remote farmhouse, where they will confront long-buried secrets and sins of the past.

== Plot ==
=== Part 1: The Ghost of Willow Road ===
Thomas "Tommy" Graham is a man with intellectual disability who lives on a farm in Texas with his abusive and alcoholic father Josiah. His twin siblings Eli and Mary have long since left the farm.

Two representatives of an oil company are looking to buy the farm and the land around it for oil drilling. The assemblyman they contact for assistance informs them that the Graham property has a troubled past, due to Josiah's wife Miriam hanging herself in their garden several decades prior.

Tommy goes to a shop and speaks to a young boy named Tanner, whom he is not supposed to speak to. Later, Tommy admits to Josiah that he looks for his mother at night through the window and notes that people are talking about her death, causing Josiah to slap him.

The next day, Josiah tells Tommy that Miriam's spirit visited him while he was asleep and told him that they need to right their ways to save her from hell. He orders Tommy to clean up the house. Josiah later finds a pornographic magazine under Tommy's bed and forces him to masturbate to it. That night, Josiah tells Tommy that God has something that needs to be done.

=== Part 2: Eli and the Gypsies ===
Eli Graham is a convicted sex offender who did time for the statutory rape of a sixteen year old girl five years prior and is in deep debt due to gambling and drugs. He is briefly arrested due to a 9 year old girl having gone missing in the vicinity.

Eli is forced to accept a job from Boone, a bartender and criminal, to steal some Nazi gold from a band of Romani in exchange for his record being cleared and his debt being settled. He is accompanied by two men, and is tasked with keeping the Romani distracted at a party they are having while the two men steal the gold.

At the party, Eli bonds with Gina, a Romani, who offers to provide consultation with a fortune teller. The fortune teller reads his palms and initially provides innocuous details about Eli, but later says that Eli is going to die and that he could not save "her". She then reads his tea leaves and says that he is the reason his mother is burning, he is running from something "unspeakable" and that he has come to steal their gold. The Romani proceed to kill the two men Eli came with; during the commotion, he spots the missing girl in the building.

Eli obtains the chest containing the gold and rescues the girl. They manage to escape the pursuing Romani by car, and Eli brings the gold to Boone. Boone falls over dead while examining the gold. Eli brings the girl to the sheriff, who lets him go. He returns to the trailer he lives in and finds a letter from the oil company offering to buy the farm.

=== Part 3: Mary May I ===
Mary Milner and her husband Ross are at an adoption agency looking to qualify to adopt a child. The agent asks Mary about her tubal ligation operation she had 20 years ago. Mary explains she was "young" and it was before she knew she wanted to be a mother. The agent expresses concerns about the couple filing for separation six years ago, and asks Mary if she would be open to psychiatric evaluation. That night, Mary becomes defensive at a dinner party when a friend tells her she would be a wonderful mother. After dinner, Ross angrily confronts her about her remarks and over past threats she made to kill herself. While sleeping, she dreams that she is stabbing herself in the stomach.

The next day, Eli arrives at Mary's place to discuss the offer by the oil company to buy the farm. Eli tries to convince her to sign off on the offer, but she decides she'll go back to the farm, so that she'll know it's gone for good.

Mary and Eli arrive at the farm and reunite with Tommy for the first time in years. Tommy informs Josiah that the twins have arrived, and Josiah says that they are the reason their mother is "burning" while watching them walk through the garden. Tommy and Mary talk together in the kitchen, while Eli tries to dig up something buried in the garden without success.

That night, the three siblings sit together with Josiah, and it is revealed that Tommy has been repeatedly and unknowingly violating his restraining order against his ex-wife and their son Tanner. Tommy accuses Eli and Mary of committing incest due to Mary having a child when they were young. It is then revealed that Josiah has been dead for 23 years and Tommy has been interacting with a hallucination of him throughout the film. Josiah abused Tommy and Eli and molested Mary when they were children, leading to Mary becoming pregnant. Mrs Graham committed suicide after learning that Josiah had impregnated Mary, which prompted the three siblings to kill Josiah and bury his body in the garden.

Eli breaks open a chest to reveal the skeletons of Mary's child and Josiah. Tommy snaps completely and kills Eli and Mary with an axe. Josiah's hallucination drinks from a cup while seated on his chair. The final scene reveals that Eli and Mary had sex at the motel they stayed at prior to coming to the farm.

In a post-credits scene, Josiah lunges at the camera while laughing maniacally.

== Cast ==
- Robert Patrick as Josiah Graham
- Nick Stahl as Eli Graham
- Scott Haze as Thomas Graham
- Kelli Garner as Mary Milner
- Jake Weber as Boone
- Tony Hale as Ross Milner
- Ronnie Gene Blevins as Billy
- Dana Namerode as Gypsy Gina
- Riley Kahn as Little Girl

== Production ==
In December 2019, it was announced that filming had wrapped in Oklahoma. Some scenes were removed from the film's final cut, including a scene in which Josiah torments Mary, which Patrick described as his favorite scene to film, and one that delved into Mary's trauma.

== Release ==
The film had its world premiere at the Fantasia International Film Festival on August 13, 2021. The distribution rights were acquired by Shudder in April 2022; it was released on the platform on August 4, 2022.

== Reception ==
On the review aggregator website Rotten Tomatoes, 91% of 43 critics' reviews are positive, with an average rating of 7.40/10. The website's consensus reads: "What Josiah Saw may be too unrelentingly unpleasant for some viewers, but this slow-burning look at generational trauma leaves a lingering, nightmarish impact." Metacritic, which uses a weighted average, assigned the film a score of 70 out of 100, based on 8 critics, indicating "generally favorable" reviews.

Brian Tallerico of RogerEbert.com gave the film a positive review and wrote that the film "is unapologetically brutal, the kind of haunting drama that feels unsettling and dangerous even in its quiet, character-driven moments." Andrew Mack of Screen Anarchy also gave the film a positive review and wrote, "Robert Patrick is an absolute force to be reckoned with." Michelle Swope of Dread Central awarded the film four and a half stars out of five and wrote, "Masterful storytelling, spectacular performances, and an overwhelming atmosphere of dread make What Josiah Saw brilliantly agonizing psychological horror." Bobby LePire of Film Threat gave the film a 10 out of 10 and wrote that it "examines religion, trauma, grief, sanity, and familial bonds in a truly unique way." The Guardian's Phil Hoad gave it 4/5 stars, writing, "What Josiah Saw isn’t quite as accomplished as Pulp Fiction, whose intersecting trajectories and penchant for petty criminal sleaze it shares. But it has a stubborn, almost literary feel for character that accumulates a baleful momentum by the time the finale hits."

Brian Costello of Common Sense Media gave the film 3/5 stars, calling it "a good but not great movie that seems like it has a shot at attaining cult status, as it's likely to reward repeated viewings (assuming one would want to do such a thing, considering what transpires in some of the more shocking scenes)", but said it was "damaged by too-long scenes involving traveling Romani who are portrayed stereotypically." He concluded, "It's maddeningly close to being a great movie, but these forays into the Tarantino-esque (particularly with the second vignette) make the whole thing feel less inspired than the rest of it."

Katie Rife of The A.V. Club gave the film a negative review and wrote that "the writer-director piles deviancy on top of taboo until your trauma receptors go numb." Josh Bell of Comic Book Resources wrote, "Plenty of horror movies, from Ari Aster's Hereditary to Bryan Bertino's similar – and superior – The Dark and the Wicked, mine family trauma for terror, but What Josiah Saw barely wrings any terror out of its familial history and relationships."
