= Gravity Entertainment =

Film and television production company

Gravity Entertainment was a film and television production company formed in 1997. The company was modeled on the traditional Hollywood Studio, where the main business is development and production of motion pictures and television programming.

In 2008, Gravity Entertainment agent Marshall Carson was issued a cease and desist orders in Alabama and Wisconsin, following the sale of unlicensed securities.

== Films ==
- Bully (2001)
- 360 (2011)

== Television ==
- The Suitor (2001)

== Music ==
- "Somebody Loves You" - Anthony B
- "Lighter" - Anthony B, Wyclef Jean and Bone Crusher
