= Thanks of a Grateful Nation =

1998 American television film

- Genre: Drama
- Written by: John Sacret Young
- Directed by: Rod Holcomb
- Starring: Ted Danson; Brian Dennehy; Marg Helgenberger; Jennifer Jason Leigh; Steven Weber; Matt Keeslar; Robin Gammell; Sabrina Grdevich
- Music by: David Hamilton
- Country of origin: United States
- Original language: English

Production
- Executive producers: Andrew Adelson; Tracey Alexander; John Sacret Young
- Producer: Lisa Niedenthal
- Cinematography: Paul Elliott
- Editor: Christopher Nelson
- Running time: 180 minutes
- Production companies: Adelson Entertainment; Tracey Alexander Productions

Original release
- Network: Showtime
- Release: May 31, 1998

Thanks of a Grateful Nation is a 1998 original film about the Gulf War. Directed by Rod Holcomb, it stars Ted Danson, Jennifer Jason Leigh, and Brian Dennehy.

== Cast ==
- Ted Danson as Jim Tuite
- Brian Dennehy as Senator Donald Riegle
- Jennifer Jason Leigh as Terri Small
- Marg Helgenberger as Jerrilyn Folz
- Steven Weber as Jared Gallimore
- Matt Keeslar as Chris Small
- Robin Gammell as Clark Nugent
- Sabrina Grdevich as Sandra
- C. David Johnson as Steve Robertson
- Cynthia Dale as Lisa Tuite
- Amy Carlson as Tammy Boyer
- Kenneth Welsh as Senator Shelby
- Booth Savage as Gary Wall
- Bruce Gray as Senator Rockefeller
- Michael Rhoades as Sergeant George Grass
- Jonathan Whittaker as Representative Steve Buyer
- Hrant Alinak as Dr. Sid Beria
- Liisa Repo-Martell as Kristie Schuermann
- Steve Mousseau as Sterling Sims
- Susan Coyne as Ammie West
- Martha Burns as Dr. Rosemary Dove
- Lynne Deragon as Mrs. Gallimore
- Garnet Harding as Jimmy
- Richard Chevolleau as Tater
- Tony Munch as Ned Brisby
- Janet Kidder as Rosca
- Gina Clayton as Dr. Applebaum
- Robert Bockstael as Dr. Lavigello
- Nicholas Campbell as Representative Joseph P. Kennedy II
- Richard Fitzpatrick as Dr. Egilson
- Scott Gibson as Tray Haworth
- Karyn Dwyer as Deeni
- Hardee T. Lineham as Major Thomas Cross
- Gerard Parkes as Ferdinand Noble
- Marcia Bennett as Dr. Joyce Lasnot
- J. Patrick McCormack as Bert Tardino
- Nigel Bennett as Colonel Sanitsky
- Ken James as Dr. Evan Johns
- Christina Collins as Jan Sparks
- John Nelles as Dr. Fritz Roddam
- Tyrone Benskin as Supervisor Meeker
- Michael Dyson as Stewy Galardi
- Robert Bidaman as Dr. Donald Curtis
- Norma Dell'Agnese as Vanna
- William Colgate as Dr. Seawell
- Patrick Chilvers as Keith Ruckhauser
- Sharon Bernbaum as Dr. Nashal
- Greg Ellwood as Dr. Tobias Azian
- Ralph Small as Major Rongjaw
- Lynne Cormack as Diedre Tama
- Alan Murley as General Stalls
- John Mark Robinson as Sergeant Elvis Jones
- Carolyn Dunn as Sally Goodnight
- Victoria Snow as Marcia Timmerman
- David Crean as James Holsinger
- Carol Anderson as Dr. Susan Mather
- Dan Lett as Dr. Lucifer
- Richard Blackburn as Senator Bennett
- Jan Filips as Congressman
- Andrew Miller as Jeff Bradford
- John Innes as Pastor
- Barry Flatman as Lieutenant Colonel Nalls
- Matthew Bennett as Dr. Larson
- Mung-Ling Tsui as Dr. Nishimi
- John Dibben as Dr. Caplan
- James Downing as David Folz
- Jean Daigle as Jon Querry
- Amanda Farrace as Kourtney Foir
- Jonathan Higgins as George Littell
- Panou as Kim
- William Pappas as Representative Sonny Montgomery
- Kinnery Thompson as Alexandra Small

== Awards and nominations ==
Year	Award	Category	Nominee(s)	Result	Ref.
1998	Artios Awards	Best Casting for TV Movie of the Week	Lynn Kressel	Nominated	
1999	Golden Reel Awards	Best Sound Editing – Television Movies of the Week – Sound Effects & Foley		Nominated	
1999	Golden Reel Awards	Best Sound Editing – Television Movies of the Week – Music	Michael Baber and Dean Hovey	Nominated	
1999	Humanitas Prize	PBS/Cable Television	John Sacret Young	Won	
1999	Satellite Awards	Best Miniseries or Motion Picture Made for Television		Nominated	
1999	Satellite Awards	Best Actress in a Miniseries or a Motion Picture Made for Television	Jennifer Jason Leigh	Nominated	
1999	Satellite Awards	Best Actor in a Supporting Role in a Miniseries or a Motion Picture Made for Television	Brian Dennehy	Nominated	
