= Bully: A True Story of High School Revenge =

1997 novel by Jim Schutze

- Author: Jim Schutze
- Language: English
- Genre: Nonfiction
- Publisher: William Morrow and Company
- Publication date: 1997
- Publication place: United States
- Pages: 256
- ISBN: 978-0-688-13517-1

Bully: A True Story of High School Revenge is a 1997 nonfiction book by Houston Chronicle writer Jim Schutze.

The book was adapted into the 2001 Larry Clark directed film Bully.

== Overview ==
The book is based on the murder of Bobby Kent, a high-school bully in an upscale Fort Lauderdale, Florida neighborhood, by seven of his friends.

== Critical reception ==
Patricia Fieldsteel of The New York Times, described it as "A deeply disturbing book, an indictment of suburban values and of an aimless, violent middle-class youth culture that is depraved because it is morally -- not economically -- deprived." The book received positive reviews from Kirkus Reviews, and Publishers Weekly.
