= Bully (2001 film) =

Crime drama film by Larry Clark

- Theatrical release poster
- Directed by: Larry Clark
- Screenplay by: David McKenna (Note: credited as 'Zachary Long'.); Roger Pullis
- Based on: Bully (1997 book) by Jim Schutze
- Produced by: Don Murphy; Chris Hanley; Fernando Sulichin
- Starring: Brad Renfro; Bijou Phillips; Rachel Miner; Michael Pitt; Kelli Garner; Leo Fitzpatrick; Nick Stahl
- Cinematography: Steve Gainer
- Edited by: Andrew Hafitz
- Music by: Joe Poledouris; Jerome Dillon
- Production companies: Blacklist Films; Gravity Entertainment; Muse Productions; StudioCanal
- Distributed by: Lionsgate Films
- Release dates: June 15, 2001 (Method Fest); July 13, 2001 (US); December 12, 2001 (France)
- Running time: 113 minutes
- Countries: United States; France
- Language: English
- Budget: $2.1 million
- Box office: $1.4 million

Bully is a 2001 teen crime drama film directed by Larry Clark, based on the events surrounding the 1993 murder of Bobby Kent. It stars Brad Renfro, Bijou Phillips, Rachel Miner, Michael Pitt, Leo Fitzpatrick, Daniel Franzese, Kelli Garner, and Nick Stahl. The screenplay was adapted by David McKenna (under the pseudonym Zachary Long) and Roger Pullis from the book Bully: A True Story of High School Revenge by Jim Schutze. Its plot follows a group of teenagers in South Florida who enact a murder plot against their mutual bully, Kent, who has emotionally, physically, and sexually abused them for years.

Bully was given a limited release in the United States on July 13, 2001, by Lionsgate Films. The film received mixed reviews from critics, with some deriding it as an exploitation film for its graphic depiction of teen sexuality, while others praised it for its straightforward portrayal of youth crime and murder. It was nominated for the Golden Lion award at the 58th Venice International Film Festival, and both Miner and director Clark received awards at the Stockholm Film Festival.

== Plot ==
In 1993, South Florida high school dropouts Ali Willis and Lisa Connelly befriend local deli employees Bobby Kent and Marty Puccio, going out on a double date. Later that evening, in Bobby's parked car, Ali performs oral sex on Bobby, while Lisa and Marty have sex in the back seat. Lisa later learns she is pregnant, but thinks the child is Bobby's instead of Marty's, since Bobby beat Marty unconscious and raped her after.

Bobby emotionally and physically abuses Marty, who puts up with his violent tendencies. On one occasion, Bobby rapes Ali while forcing her to watch gay pornography with him. Lisa later tells Marty that everyone suspects Bobby is attracted to him. Marty reveals that the abuse started when they were boys, starting with Marty taking drugs at an early age, which Marty thinks Bobby has been using to take advantage of him. Marty and Bobby later go to a gay bar, where Marty is told to strip down and dance for money, while Bobby takes pleasure in his humiliation.

Lisa eventually proposes that the group murder Bobby. Ali recruits her new boyfriend, the pot-smoking and acid-dropping Donny Semenec, and a troubled friend, Heather Swallers, who has recently been released from rehab. Lisa recruits her cousin, the shy and nerdy Derek Dzvirko. They initially plan to kill Bobby with a gun stolen from Lisa's mother. Ali and Lisa lure Bobby to the Everglades, the plan being that Lisa will shoot him while he has sex with Ali, but Lisa finds herself unable to do it. Realizing they need help, the group hires a supposed "hitman" and a friend of Ali's, Derek Kaufman.

The group orchestrates a new plan: they drive with Bobby to the Everglades again, and Ali again lures Bobby to the bank of a canal with the promise of sex. Heather haphazardly gives a signal to Donny, who sneaks up behind Bobby and stabs him in the back of the neck. Horrified by the violence, Ali, Heather, and Dzvirko run back to Ali's car. Lisa watches as Marty and Donny repeatedly stab Bobby and slit his throat, before Kaufman bludgeons Bobby with a baseball bat. Kaufman forces Dzvirko to help carry the dying Bobby into the swamp, presuming alligators will consume the corpse.

Marty later realizes that he left the sheath to his diving knife at the canal. The group returns to retrieve the sheath and finds Bobby's corpse being devoured by crabs. Lisa, Dzvirko, Ali, and Heather do not believe they did anything wrong, since they did not directly participate in Bobby's actual murder. Lisa decides to dispose of the knife, which is the only evidence linking them to the crime.

Unable to maintain the secret, Dzvirko and Lisa reveal to their other friends what they've done, while Ali phones in an anonymous tip to the media, alerting them to Bobby's death. Lisa calls Kaufman and speaks to his younger brother, who says that Kaufman has already been arrested for the murder. Eventually, all the teenagers turn themselves in, except for Marty, who is subsequently arrested. Some time later, the group appears in court, wearing prison jumpsuits, with Lisa visibly pregnant by this time. Marty and Donny begin to argue, leading the others to join in as they each respectively deny their culpability in front of an onlooking courtroom.

Title cards reveal the convictions the perpetrators received in real life: Derek Kaufman, Donny Semenec, and Lisa Connelly received life sentences; Ali Willis, 40 years; Derek Dzvirko, 11 years; Heather Swallers, seven years; and Marty Puccio, the death penalty, which was vacated in 1997.

== Cast ==
- Brad Renfro as Martin "Marty" Puccio, Bobby's best friend
- Bijou Phillips as Alice "Ali" Willis, Bobby's ex-girlfriend
- Rachel Miner as Lisa Connelly, Marty's girlfriend
- Nick Stahl as Bobby Kent
- Michael Pitt as Donny Semenec, Ali's boyfriend
- Leo Fitzpatrick as Derek Kaufman, a hitman
- Kelli Garner as Heather Swallers, Lisa's friend
- Daniel Franzese as Derek Dzvirko, Lisa's cousin
- Nathalie Paulding as Claudia
- Olivia Burnette as Jennifer Stable
- Jessica Sutta as Emma
- Ed Amatrudo as Fred Kent
- Deborah Smith Ford as Farah Kent
- Steven Raulerson as Mr. Willis
- Judith Clayton as Mrs. Willis
- Alan Lilly as Martin Puccio
- Irene B. Colletti as Veronica Puccio
- Marc Pearson as Marty's brother

== Production ==
=== Development ===
The film was originally slated to go into production in the mid-to-late '90s before the Columbine school shootings, but financiers backed away in the wake of the events. Screenwriter David McKenna said that the Columbine shootings, along with other high-school gun-related tragedies at the time, were justification for the script, commenting, "It's time that we woke up to the way many of our kids are living."

Several drafts of the screenplay had been written, all of which were turned down by Larry Clark in favor of filming scenes straight from Schutze's book, which featured real court testimonies and first-hand accounts of the murder. Whilst staying faithful to the real events, Clark opted to have the film set contemporarily. Clark said an early screenplay draft removed any homosexual subtext, particularly the implication Bobby is gay and closeted, but Clark tried to put it back in.

=== Casting ===
Before Brad Renfro was cast as Marty, Jake Gyllenhaal and Ashton Kutcher were considered for the role. Clark sought Nick Stahl for the role of Bobby, though Stahl initially thought he was not right for the role, saying, "If you drew the polar opposite of who I was at that time, it would probably be Bobby Kent. I mean, I was rail thin. I'd worked out twice before the movie started, so clearly it wasn't any kind of physicality that intrigued Larry." Though Lionsgate Films thought the roles of Bobby and Marty were miscast, Clark embraced the casting of Renfro and Stahl in their respective roles because he wanted to subvert audience expectations of what a bully looks like. Casting director Carmen Cuba said, "The idea of who is a bully and who gets bullied — in this case, it felt unusual to make the choice this way, but that made it more interesting and more layered."

Zooey Deschanel was originally set to play Ali Willis, but ended up filming Big Trouble that was also shooting in Florida at the time. Jared Leto was also considered for the role of Derek Kaufman before Leo Fitzpatrick, who had previously worked with Clark on Kids, was cast. Daniel Franzese had no prior screen credits and was scouted by Cuba while singing at a talent show night at a Florida bar.

Clark said that the casting of Bijou Phillips helped the film get green-lit, saying, "She hadn't acted, but that name - because she was in the paper every day for being a club kid…that name got us the money to get financed." Kelli Garner had just completed the short film The Architecture of Reassurance by director Mike Mills at the time she was cast: "[I] had dyed my hair blue [for that film], and I also had these, like, clear braces on my teeth. I think Larry was very obsessed or attracted to how I looked in that film. He was originally interested in me for a smaller role, as the Pizza Hut girl, and I was like, “No, I don’t want to do that role. I’ll do this film if I get to play Heather.”"

=== Filming ===
Principal photography of Bully began August 21, 2000, in southern Florida. Filming took place at many of the locations where the real-life incidents occurred. The crew was originally given 40 days to complete filming, but this was reduced to 23 days due to budgetary restrictions from Lionsgate. The shoot was said to be "chaotic" due to a "compressed production schedule, tempestuous weather conditions, and behind-the-scenes drama."

The plainclothes officer who arrests Marty is Frank Ilarraza, a police detective who arrested the real Marty Puccio in 1993. Several production assistants on the film had attended high school with the actual perpetrators.

Producers were able to secure the rights for the song "Forgot About Dre" because Eminem was a fan of Clark's work.

Daniel Franzese later alleged that Bijou Phillips had "ridiculed" him about his sexuality and weight, and physically assaulted him on set, requiring the intervention of other cast members. He called the shoot "one of the most stressful experiences of my life on or off a set." Phillips subsequently apologized for her behavior, which Franzese accepted.

== Release ==
Bully was originally slated for a wide theatrical release, but these plans were derailed due to executive changes at Lionsgate three weeks before release. Clark had sought an R rating for the film, but the MPAA ruled in favor of an NC-17. Clark chose to release the film unrated, and it opened on July 13, 2001, to a total of six theaters, later expanding to 20 theaters at its widest.

Screenwriter David McKenna was unhappy with the finished film and chose to be credited under the pseudonym "Zachary Long".

=== Home media ===
Bully was released on DVD and VHS on January 29, 2002, by Lionsgate. The film was released on Blu-ray on October 31, 2023, in France by StudioCanal. Umbrella Entertainment issued a limited edition Blu-ray in Australia on March 20, 2024, featuring an exclusive booklet and art cards, limited to 750 units. A standard numbered edition limited to 2,250 units was also released.

== Reception ==
=== Box office ===
The film earned $47,502 during its opening weekend in the United States, screening at six theaters. The film concluded its American theatrical run with a gross of $881,824. It earned an additional $500,000 internationally, making for a worldwide box office gross of $1,381,824.

=== Critical response ===
Bully received mixed reviews from critics. On the review aggregator website Rotten Tomatoes, 54% of 89 critics' reviews are positive, with an average rating of 6.4/10. The website's consensus reads: "With its lingering shots of naked teenage bodies, Bully feels more sordidly exploitative than realistic." Metacritic, which uses a weighted average, assigned the film a score of 45 out of 100, based on 26 critics, indicating "mixed or average" reviews.

Criticism of the film largely focused on the prolonged scenes of graphic sex and nudity, particularly of its female cast, which critics called "gratuitous", "voyeuristic," and "prurient." Dennis Harvey of Variety wrote while the film "certainly does sport believe-it-or-not black-comedy aspects, some of which Clark grasps — as in [a] late courtroom scene", it "seems convinced that staring agog at the banalities of affluent suburbia constitutes a scorching critique". Harvey claimed the film was hypocritical because "Clark wags a shaming finger [at the audience] on one hand while the other frantically keeps titillation value at full tumescence".

Critics were also divided about the intent and messaging of the film. Manohla Dargis of LA Weekly praised how Clark "catches, the way Warhol once did, the bottomed-out timelessness of too many hours spent hanging out, but since Clark is also a rigorous (and here, at least, rigid) moralist, he also puts the screws to the audience. He does it by refusing to offer up an ounce of psychological depth or rationale. He shows us a group of kids who murder then declines to really tell us why." In contrast, Rene Rodriguez of the Miami Herald said, "What Bully doesn't do -- what it can't do -- is explain how these otherwise sane kids went from merely talking about killing someone to actually doing it…Clark shies away from embellishing the story told in Schutze's book, which means that while the movie gets the facts right, it misses the inner life of its protagonists. The kids are all surface, with nothing underneath." Rodriguez added, "Although the performances are strong…the film keeps its distance, and that detachment has led some to dismiss Bully as a pointless wallow in degradation and exploitation".

Marjorie Baumgarten of The Austin Chronicle said, "The film's naked plenitude (and pulchritude) casts suspicion on Clark's ulterior reasons for making the movie—especially in light of the fact that Bully doesn't seem to have an overall point of view that it's trying to push. There are no heroes or victims, and everyone is at least a minor villain. Clark's film is disturbing not only for what it shows, but how it shows it. If it weren't so rivetingly realistic, it would be an easy film to dismiss. And if it weren't so easily dismissible, it would be an easy film to defend." Kim Morgan of The Oregonian echoed the sentiment that Clark portrays the events in the film in a clinical manner, writing: "Bully is neither sympathetic or demonizing. It forces the viewer to fill in the blanks. It's both a moral tale and a bit of exploitation. It's often dumb and disturbing, and sometimes powerful. Either way, you can't look away." Peter Bradshaw of The Guardian similarly described the film as "a magnificent, coldly brilliant movie conveyed to us in an amoral neon glare, in which the director's only compelling value judgment is a swooning reverie at the beauty of his teen stars. In this Lord of the Flies world, adult supervision is not so much absent as irrelevant. Parents are indifferent or ineffective, and teenagers see no reason not to avail themselves of the adult prerogative of violence."

David E. Williams of Film Threat described the film as "simply a borderline porno flick that only becomes a real movie in its third act" and critiqued the inconsistency of its character development; however, he praised the performances of Fitzpatrick, Pitt, and Garner. James Mottram of Sight & Sound said compared to Clark's film Kids, "the vérité visual style is missing". Kevin Thomas of the Los Angeles Times said Clark "brings alive so compellingly the aimless, brutal existence" of these teenagers, but "whatever aspirations he may have had in attempting to make a movie of the level of Jonathan Kaplan's Over the Edge or Tim Hunter's River's Edge, two classic studies of lethally disaffected suburban youth", are undercut by the film's lingering on sex and nudity. Thomas added, "Clark demands the utmost of Renfro, Miner and Stahl...[they] respond by daringly walking a tightrope between a craziness that escalates to a dark absurdity and an all-out ludicrousness. Renfro comes across as a good kid neither strong nor smart enough to resist Lisa and Bobby's relentlessly destructive personalities".

Roger Ebert was one of the film's notable admirers and gave the film four out of four stars. In his review, he stated: "Larry Clark's Bully calls the bluff of movies that pretend to be about murder but are really about entertainment. His film has all the sadness and shabbiness, all the mess and cruelty and thoughtless stupidity of the real thing...The movie is brilliantly and courageously well-acted by its young cast; it's one of those movies so perceptive and wounding that there's no place for the actors to hide, no cop out they can exercise."

Ebert added, "Clark is obviously obsessed by the culture of floating, unplugged teenagers. Sometimes his camera seems too willing to watch during the scenes of nudity and sex, and there is one particular shot that seems shameless in its voyeurism...But it's this very drive that fuels his films. If the director doesn't have a strong personal feeling about material like this, he shouldn't be making movies about it...I believe Bully is a masterpiece on its own terms, a frightening indictment of a society that offers absolutely nothing to some of its children—and an indictment of the children, who lack the imagination and courage to try to escape. Bobby and his killers deserve one another."

=== Accolades ===
Award	Year	Category	Nominee(s)	Result	Ref.
Prism Awards	2002	PRISM Certificate of Merit for Theatrical Feature Film	Bully	Won	
Stockholm Film Festival	2001	Best Actress	Rachel Miner	Won	
Stockholm Film Festival	2001	Bronze Horse	Larry Clark	Won	
Venice Film Festival	2001	Golden Lion	Bully	Nominated	

== Soundtrack ==
Bully: Music from the Larry Clark Film

Soundtrack album by Various artists
- Released: October 2, 2001
- Genres: Hip hop, rock, electronic
- Length: 56:02
- Label: OCF Entertainment

The soundtrack was released on October 2, 2001, by OCF Entertainment. Other songs that appear in the film include "Forgot About Dre" by Dr. Dre feat. Eminem, "Excess" by Tricky, and "When the Shit Goes Down" by Cypress Hill.

=== Track listing ===
1. "Intro - Kill the Bully" – Thurston Moore
2. "Thug Ass Bitch" – Ghetto Inmates
3. "Last Call" – Ol' Dirty Bastard
4. "Bottom Feeders" – Smut Peddlers feat. R.A. the Rugged Man
5. "Suicidal Failure" – Cage
6. "Blood on My Shirt" – Thurston Moore
7. "Who Dat" – JT Money feat. Solé
8. "Joyride" – Bomber
9. "We About to Get Fuck Up" – Tha Dogg Pound
10. "Shut the Fuck up Donny" – Thurston Moore
11. "Latin Thug" – Sen Dog
12. "Bury the Evidence" – Tricky
13. "Jesus" – Bizzy Bone
14. "Unloved" – Zoe Poledouris
15. "Song for Shelter" – Fatboy Slim
16. "Outro - Get Your Story Together" – Thurston Moore

== See also ==
- River's Edge
- Mean Creek
- List of hood films
- List of films that most frequently use the word fuck
