= American History X =

1998 American crime drama film by Tony Kaye

- Theatrical release poster
- Directed by: Tony Kaye
- Written by: David McKenna
- Produced by: John Morrissey
- Starring: Edward Norton; Edward Furlong; Fairuza Balk; Stacy Keach; Elliott Gould; Avery Brooks; Beverly D'Angelo
- Cinematography: Tony Kaye
- Edited by: Gerald B. Greenberg; Alan Heim
- Music by: Anne Dudley
- Production companies: New Line Cinema; The Turman-Morrissey Company
- Distributed by: New Line Cinema
- Release date: October 30, 1998 (United States)
- Running time: 119 minutes
- Country: United States
- Language: English
- Budget: $20 million
- Box office: $23.8 million

American History X is a 1998 American crime drama film directed by Tony Kaye in his feature directorial debut, and written by David McKenna. Starring Edward Norton, Edward Furlong, Fairuza Balk, Stacy Keach, Elliott Gould, Avery Brooks, and Beverly D'Angelo, the film follows Derek (Norton), and Danny Vinyard (Furlong), two skinhead brothers from Los Angeles who are involved in the White supremacist movement. After Derek serves three years in prison for killing two gang members, he is released on parole as a changed man and tries to prevent Danny from being indoctrinated further.

McKenna wrote the script based on his own childhood and experiences of growing up in San Diego. He sold the script to New Line Cinema, which was impressed by the writing. Steve Tisch and Lawrence Turman served as executive producers on the film. Principal photography began in Los Angeles on March 17, 1997, and concluded on May 21. Prior to the film's release, Kaye and New Line Cinema were in disagreements over the final cut of the film, which Norton had played a pivotal role in editing. The final version was 40 minutes longer than Kaye's 95-minute cut, which resulted in him publicly disowning the film through dozens of trade paper advertisements, thus negatively affecting his directing career.

American History X was theatrically released in limited screenings in the United States on October 30, 1998, before expanding to wide release on November 20. The film received critical acclaim, with Norton's performance earning widespread praise, often considered to be one of the best performances of his career. However, it underperformed at the box office, grossing $23.8 million against its $20 million production budget. Norton was nominated for the Academy Award for Best Actor at the 71st Academy Awards and the Saturn Award for Best Actor at the 25th Saturn Awards. At the 3rd Satellite Awards, Norton won for Best Actor in a Motion Picture – Drama, while D'Angelo was nominated for Best Supporting Actress in a Motion Picture – Drama and McKenna was nominated for Best Original Screenplay.

A follow-up, African History Y, with Kaye returning as director, as well as co-writer and co-producer, and starring Djimon Hounsou, was in development as of 2020.

== Plot ==
In 1997, White student Danny Vinyard, 17, antagonizes his Jewish history teacher, Mr. Murray, by writing an essay on Mein Kampf. Black School principal and outreach worker Dr. Bob Sweeney gives Danny an ultimatum to either study history directly under him through current events, branded as "American History X", or be expelled. Danny must write a paper on his older brother, Derek, Sweeney's former student and neo-Nazi gang leader, about to be released from prison. Later in the school restroom, when a Black youth bullies another White student, Danny confronts the bully by blowing cigarette smoke in his face, and the bully leaves.

Years earlier, Danny and Derek's firefighter father, Dennis Vinyard, is shot and killed by a Black drug dealer while extinguishing a fire at a crack house in Compton, Greater Los Angeles. Immediately afterwards, Derek erupts in a televised, racially motivated tirade. Neo-Nazi Cameron Alexander becomes his mentor, and they form a violent White supremacist gang called the Disciples of Christ (D.O.C.). Derek's charismatic argumentation of White supremacist views quickly expand the D.O.C., and the gang attacks a local supermarket employing illegal immigrants. Later, Derek challenges and defeats Crips in a basketball game for territorial rights to a basketball court in his Venice Beach neighborhood.

In 1994, Derek's mother, Doris, invites Murray, her boyfriend, to dinner, where Derek escalates an argument about Rodney King and the 1992 Los Angeles riots. Derek assaults his sister Davina and insults Murray for being Jewish, causing Doris to banish Derek. That night, the Crips who Derek had antagonized on the basketball court attempt to steal his truck. Alerted by Danny to the theft in progress, Derek fatally shoots one and curb stomps the other in front of Danny. Derek is arrested and sentenced to three years in prison for voluntary manslaughter.

In prison, Derek joins the Aryan Brotherhood, and despite initial resistance, he befriends Black inmate Lamont, his co-worker in the prison laundry. Abandoned by the D.O.C. and disillusioned by prison gang politics and drug-dealing, Derek subsequently leaves the Aryan Brotherhood, realizing it is a criminal gang using White supremacy as a facade. In retaliation, the Brotherhood beat and gang rape him in the communal shower.

Sweeney visits the hospitalized Derek, who pleads for help to leave prison. Rebuking Derek for needing to deal with the consequences of his actions, Sweeney reveals his own racist past and informs Derek that the D.O.C. is indoctrinating Danny. After leaving the hospital, Derek publicly snubs the Aryan Brotherhood; Lamont warns Derek that he has exposed himself to murder by other inmates for his past affiliation. Derek is never harmed due to Lamont's intervention; before leaving prison, Derek thanks Lamont.

Returning home to find a D.O.C.-tattooed skinhead Danny, Derek tries to persuade him to leave the group. At a D.O.C. party, Derek confronts Cameron for using and then abandoning him for three years. Declaring his departure from the group, Derek forbids them to use Danny. When mocked, Derek brutally beats Cameron. D.O.C. member Seth, Derek's ex-girlfriend Stacey, and others attack Derek. Seth pulls a gun, but Derek disarms him and holds everyone at gunpoint before fleeing, tossing the gun into a nearby dumpster.

Finding Derek, Danny angrily confronts him over his actions. Derek relates his experiences in prison, prompting a change in Danny. Returning home, they remove neo-Nazi posters from their shared bedroom. The next morning, Danny completes his paper for American History X, reflecting on how Derek adopted racist views from their father, as shown in flashback. As Derek walks Danny to school, they encounter Sweeney and a police officer who inform them that Seth and Cameron were attacked the night before and are in an intensive care unit. Derek denies any involvement but ostensibly agrees to see what he can find out.

In the restroom before class, Danny encounters the Black student he confronted the day before, who pulls a gun and kills him. Derek runs to the school, pushing past crowds and police officers. Cradling Danny's bloodied corpse in hysterics, he blames himself for influencing Danny's views and actions. In a voiceover, Danny reads the final lines of his paper for Dr. Sweeney, quoting the final lines of Abraham Lincoln's first inaugural address.

== Cast ==
- Edward Norton as Derek Vinyard, a former neo-Nazi
- Edward Furlong as Danny Vinyard, Derek's younger brother
- Beverly D'Angelo as Doris Vinyard, Derek's mother
- Jennifer Lien as Davina Vinyard, Derek's younger sister
- Ethan Suplee as Seth Ryan
- Fairuza Balk as Stacey
- Avery Brooks as Dr. Bob Sweeney, Danny's history teacher and Derek's old English teacher
- Elliott Gould as Murray, a history teacher who dated Derek's mother briefly.
- Stacy Keach as Cameron Alexander
- William Russ as Dennis Vinyard
- Guy Torry as Lamont
- Joe Cortese as Rasmussen
- Alex Sol as Mitch McCormick
- Jason Bose Smith as Little Henry
- Antonio David Lyons as Lawrence
- Keram Malicki-Sánchez as Chris
- Giuseppe Andrews as Jason
- Christopher Masterson as Daryl Dawson
- Paul Le Mat as McMahon

== Production ==
=== Development ===
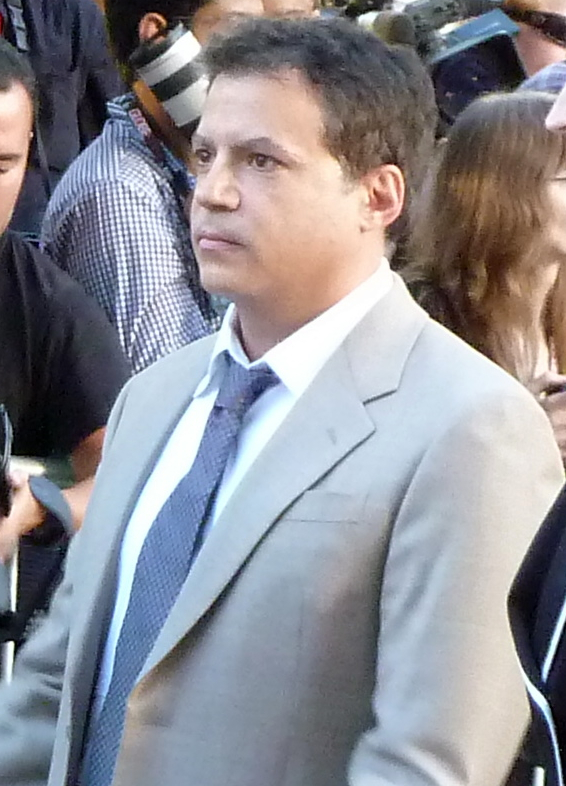
Michael De Luca, former production president at New Line Cinema

Screenwriter David McKenna wrote the screenplay for American History X and sold the rights to New Line Cinema when he was 26. The inspiration for the story came from the punk-rock scene of McKenna's childhood, where he often witnessed violent behavior. "I saw a lot of bigotry growing up, and it made me think about writing something about the world of hate-mongers. The point I tried to make in the script is that a person is not born a racist. It is learned through environment and the people that surround you. The question that intrigued me is: why do people hate and how does one go about changing that? My premise was that hate starts in the family". In order to make the characters as realistic as possible, McKenna interviewed and observed the behavior of skinheads during the writing process. He said "I had seen documentaries that just didn't ring true to me, and I wanted to write an accurate portrayal of how good kids from good families can get so terribly lost".

Producer John Morrissey, who read the script three years prior, was impressed by the script's intense characters and dialogue. Michael De Luca, then-production president of New Line Cinema, said "I was intrigued by its intensity, conviction and brutal honesty. There was a brilliant character study woven into the screenplay, and I knew we had something special if we did it correctly". In 1996, the producers first approached Dennis Hopper to direct the film. Hopper turned down the offer, Larry Clark was approached to direct the film, but turned it down due to a scheduling conflict, Tony Kaye was then approached to direct. Kaye, who had been De Luca's preferred choice from the beginning, accepted and made his directorial debut in a feature film on American History X. He took the contract to a synagogue, "I signed it in front of the rabbi. I thought it would make it good", Kaye said. After the film was released, De Luca stated "It's everything I had hoped for. The performances are explosive and frightening, and the film dramatically demonstrates both the subtle and overt roots of racism while also showing the possibility for redemption".

=== Casting ===
Joaquin Phoenix was offered the role of Derek Vinyard, but he was not interested. After holding casting calls, Kaye was unable to find a suitable actor for the lead role, but casting director Valerie McCaffrey suggested Edward Norton. Kaye initially objected, feeling that Norton lacked the "weight or presence", but he eventually conceded. According to executive producer Steve Tisch, Norton's passion for the project was "contagious", and he even agreed to a pay cut of more than $500,000 from his usual $1 million fee, to be cast in the lead. Norton was initially reluctant about the project until Francis Ford Coppola convinced him. McCaffrey also cast Edward Furlong for the role of Danny Vinyard. To prepare for the role, Norton increased his calorie intake and spent hours in the gym to gain 25 pounds (11 kg) of muscle.

=== Filming ===
I was attracted to the complexity of the role. This character travels so far within the course of the film. By the end, he's completely humanized and the audience might even be sympathetic, or at least, empathetic towards him. Derek is very much a guy whose anger and rage have superseded his intelligence. They have paralyzed his boundless potential. I liked the transformation that he goes through as his intelligence reasserts itself over his anger.

— Norton on his character

Principal photography took place in Los Angeles and Venice Beach, lasting for several months and finishing in May 1997. Kaye served as cinematographer and camera operator, and would often silently walk around the set, scouting for camera angles or visuals. During filming, Kaye established a casual environment for the cast and crew. He welcomed visitors on set, including singer Courtney Love, Norton's girlfriend at the time, and British historian John Richardson. Kaye would arrive for work in a Lincoln Town Car with a chauffeur, and a license plate that read "JEWISH". He carried four cell phones and a fax machine, and during the Passover holidays, Kaye had boxes of matzo delivered to the set. He also discovered at the time a newsletter published by a British political group, the National Front, which said he was a prominent Jew who supposedly controlled Britain's media.

Both Furlong and Ethan Suplee found taking on their roles that had hateful views to be uncomfortable. Furlong said "It's pretty intense, having to say this incredibly hateful stuff". The actors had "white power" tattoos painted on their arms, which Suplee forgot to remove one day after filming, and was confronted by a man in a convenience store. Norton recalls "Doing that film created the strangest distortion of perception on me ... the degree to which that film and the magic of camera and art and black and white photography ... made a lot of people think that I was a larger and tougher person than I am". The flashback scenes were edited to be in black-and-white, whereas the present-day scenes were edited to be in color.

=== Music ===
Kaye hired British composer Anne Dudley to score the film, and wanted the music to be "big and elegiac". She employed a full orchestra and a boys' choir, and decided against using hip-hop sounds. She said, "The neo-Nazi faction is personified in the music by a boys choir – what could be a more Aryan sound? ... A calming string orchestra instead provides a much more expressive and timeless palette".

No.	Title	Length
1.	"American History X"	4:46
2.	"The Assignment"	2:36
3.	"Venice Beach"	1:28
4.	"Playing to Win"	3:49
5.	"People Look at Me and See My Brother"	1:41
6.	"If I Had Testified"	4:05
7.	"A Stranger at My Table"	3:31
8.	"Putting Up a Flag"	2:06
9.	"Raiders"	3:02
10.	"Complications"	1:38
11.	"Starting to Remind Me of You"	1:43
12.	"The Right Questions"	3:24
13.	"The Path to Redemption"	2:56
14.	""We Are Not Enemies""	2:05
15.	"Two Brothers"	2:31
16.	"Storm Clouds Gathering"	2:04
17.	"Benedictus"	3:35
Total length:		47:00

== Release ==
Kaye's original cut of the finished film had a run time of 95 minutes, which was delivered on time and within budget. Although it generated a positive response from test screenings, New Line Cinema insisted on further edits to the film. Kaye was mortified, saying "I'm fully aware that I'm a first-time director, but I need the same autonomy and respect that Stanley Kubrick gets". Soon afterwards, Norton was involved with editing alongside Kaye, which was a difficult experience for the pair. At one point, Kaye punched a wall which resulted in stitches to his hand.

In June 1998, the film studio test-screened a second cut of the film which included changes made by Norton. The studio tried to persuade Kaye to release Norton's cut, but he objected. Although the differences between the two cuts are disputed, Kaye objected to an additional 18 minutes of footage, and they disagreed with the length of certain scenes such as a family argument, Norton's anti-immigration speech, and a flashback where Norton's father is criticizing a teacher. Subsequently, the studio compromised and gave Kaye an extra eight weeks to edit and submit a new cut of the film.

During this period, Kaye took a number of combative actions. He spent $100,000 on cryptic advertisements in the Hollywood press that quoted John Lennon and Abraham Lincoln, and condemned the behavior of Norton and the studio. At one point, Kaye brought a priest, a rabbi and a Buddhist monk to a meeting with producers while videotaping the entire encounter. When the company offered him an additional eight weeks to re-cut the film, Kaye said he had a "radical" new vision in mind, which he did not know when he would finish. He collaborated with Nobel Prize-winning poet Derek Walcott on new narration for the film.

American History X was due to premiere at the 1998 Toronto International Film Festival, but Kaye requested that organizer Piers Handling withdraw the film. On July 28, 1998, after the eight week deadline, Kaye had nothing new to show and the studio announced that it would release Norton's cut. Kaye attempted to remove his name from the film credits, applying for various pseudonyms, including "Humpty Dumpty", a request that the Directors Guild of America (DGA) refused. Kaye subsequently filed a $200 million lawsuit against DGA and New Line Cinema, although the case was dismissed in 2000. Kaye disowned the film, describing the released version, which was 24 minutes longer than his own cut, as a "total abuse of creativity" and "crammed with shots of everyone crying in each other's arms". Kaye's behavior caused Hollywood to view him as unemployable, and he did not watch the film until June 2007. He later admitted that "My ego got in the way. That was entirely my fault. [...] Whenever I can, I take the opportunity to apologize". He did not direct another film until 2006's Lake of Fire.

=== Home media ===
The film was released by New Line Home Video on DVD on April 6, 1999, on laserdisc on April 13, and on VHS on August 24 of the same year. The film was later released on Blu-ray on April 7, 2009

== Reception ==
=== Box office ===
American History X premiered in Los Angeles on October 28, 1998, and on the same week in New York. It received a wider release in the United States on October 30. The film grossed $156,076 in 17 theaters during its opening weekend. The film went on to gross $6,719,864 from 513 theaters in the United States, for a worldwide total of $23,875,127.

=== Critical response ===
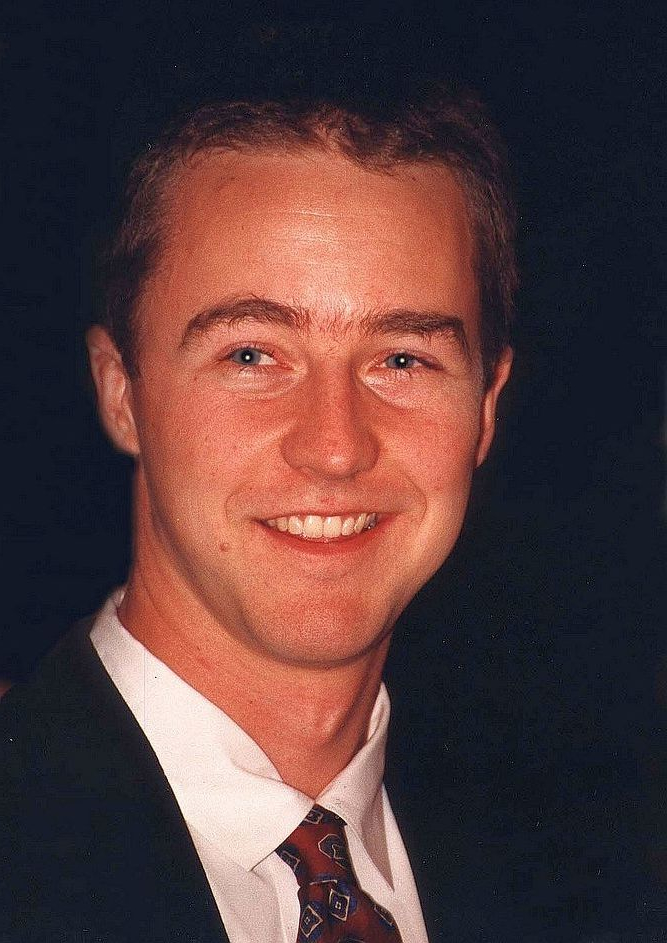
Edward Norton (pictured in 1997) received widespread critical acclaim for his performance, and was nominated for the Academy Award for Best Actor.

On Rotten Tomatoes, American History X has an approval rating of 84% based on 89 reviews, with an average rating of 7.3/10. The website's critical consensus reads, "American History X doesn't contend with its subject matter as fully as it could, but Edward Norton's performance gives this hard-hitting drama crucial weight." On Metacritic, the film has a weighted score of 62 out of 100 based on 32 critic reviews, indicating "generally favorable" reviews. Audiences surveyed by CinemaScore gave the film a grade "A" on scale of A to F.

Gene Siskel of the Chicago Tribune, gave American History X four out of four stars, describing it as "a shockingly powerful screed against racism that also manages to be so well performed and directed that it is entertaining as well", adding it was "also effective at demonstrating how hate is taught from one generation to another". He said Norton was an "immediate front-runner" for an Academy Award. Todd McCarthy, writing for Variety, gave the film a positive review stating "This jolting, superbly acted film will draw serious-minded upscale viewers interested in cutting-edge fare". He particularly praised Norton's performance, saying "His Derek mesmerizes even as he repels, and the actor fully exposes the human being behind the tough poses and attitudinizing". Janet Maslin of The New York Times wrote "Though its story elements are all too easily reduced to a simple outline, American History X has enough fiery acting and provocative bombast to make its impact felt. For one thing, its willingness to take on ugly political realities gives it a substantial raison d'être. For another, it has been directed with a mixture of handsome photo-realism and visceral punch".

Film critic Roger Ebert gave the film three out of four stars, but was critical of the underdeveloped areas, stating "the movie never convincingly charts Derek's path to race hatred". Ebert concluded "This is a good and powerful film. If I am dissatisfied, it is because it contains the promise of being more than it is". Owen Gleiberman of Entertainment Weekly called the film "riveting", and praised the narrative structure despite "thinness of the script".

Mick LaSalle of the San Francisco Chronicle expressed disappointment with the picture. LaSalle felt that while it succeeded in portraying Derek's descent into neo-Nazism, it failed to portray his renouncement of his past beliefs, "We had to watch him think his way in. We should see him think his way out". LaSalle also noted that "In some places the dialogue is surprisingly stilted. Far worse, the ending is a misfire". However, he complimented Norton's performance. Stephen Hunter, writing for The Washington Post, was highly critical of the film and gave it a negative review, calling it "an old melodramatic formula hidden under pretentious TV-commercial-slick photography". Michael O'Sullivan wrote "There are moments when Anne Dudley's string-laden score overpowers the stark simplicity of the film's message and other times when the moral of brotherly love is hammered a bit heavily", but conceded "the blunt and brutal American History X is ultimately only as imperfect as we ourselves are".

=== Accolades ===
Edward Norton was nominated for an Academy Award for Best Actor for his role as Derek Vinyard, but lost to Roberto Benigni for Life Is Beautiful. Norton's loss was included on Empire's list of "22 Incredibly Shocking Oscars Injustices".

Award	Category	Recipient(s)	Result
Academy Awards	Best Actor	Edward Norton	Nominated
Awards Circuit Community Awards	Best Motion Picture	John Morrissey	Nominated
Awards Circuit Community Awards	Best Actor in a Leading Role	Edward Norton	Won
Awards Circuit Community Awards	Best Actor in a Supporting Role	Edward Furlong	Nominated
Awards Circuit Community Awards	Best Original Screenplay	David McKenna	Nominated
Awards Circuit Community Awards	Best Film Editing	Gerald B. Greenberg and Alan Heim	Nominated
Chicago Film Critics Association Awards	Best Actor	Edward Norton	Nominated
Chlotrudis Awards	Best Actor	Edward Norton	Nominated
Golden Reel Awards	Best Sound Editing – Music (Foreign & Domestic)	Richard Ford	Nominated
Online Film Critics Society Awards	Best Actor	Edward Norton	Nominated
Political Film Society Awards	Peace		Nominated
Satellite Awards	Best Actor in a Motion Picture – Drama	Edward Norton	Won
Satellite Awards	Best Actress in a Supporting Role in a Motion Picture – Drama	Beverly D'Angelo	Nominated
Satellite Awards	Best Original Screenplay	David McKenna	Nominated
Saturn Awards	Best Actor	Edward Norton	Nominated
Southeastern Film Critics Association Awards	Best Actor	Edward Norton	Won
Taormina International Film Festival	Best Actor	Edward Norton	Won
Turkish Film Critics Association Awards	Best Foreign Film		14th Place
Young Artist Awards	Best Performance in a Feature Film: Supporting Young Actor	Edward Furlong	Nominated

=== Legacy ===
In 1999, Amnesty International USA used American History X for an educational campaign, screening the film in colleges and in nationwide events for raising awareness on human rights. Zara Toussaint, of Amnesty International in France, organized screenings in her country followed by debates. "The reactions [to the film] were varied. Some people thought that this was only an extreme case, that this kind of group was very marginal and that there could be no equivalent in France", she said. In response to the French screening, Sébastien Homer of L'Humanité wrote, "Police violence, the Rodney King affair, unsanitary prisons, ill-treatment, rejection of asylum seekers, the United States has still not assimilated what human rights, freedom, equality meant". In September 1999, Empire magazine ranked the film 311th in a list of the 500 greatest movies of all time. In 2008, Norton's performance was ranked by Total Film as the 72nd greatest film performance of all time. Although director Kaye did not watch the film until 2007, he has acknowledged that it has become "quite a little classic in its own befuddled way". In 2012, he said that he was "very proud of what we all achieved".

For its 20th anniversary, Christopher Hooton writing for The Independent opined that the film "feels more essential now that it ever has". Clayton Schuster of Vice drew comparisons between the film and both the racial rhetoric of Donald Trump and real life atrocities; the murders of nine African-Americans in a Charleston church in 2015, a far-right march in Charlottesville, Virginia in 2017 that turned violent, and a year later, a mass shooting in a Pittsburgh synagogue. He argues that these violent acts are no different to the hate represented in the movie, adding, "White supremacy has existed for centuries. It's lurked on the fringes of American power since the birth of this nation". He added "there is at least one notable difference ... The movie portrays skinheads as visually different ... They're suited up in boots with red laces, heads gleaming from a fresh shave, and tatted with Nazi insignia and racist slogans. White supremacists today have largely adopted a policy of fitting into society rather than standing out". Writing for Esquire magazine in 2018, Justin Kirkland stated that he believed that "Perhaps the reason that American History X still feels so relevant two decades after its release is because we haven't done enough for it not to be ... I'm afraid we're going to be writing about American History X forever. I'm afraid of what will happen if we don't".

== See also ==
- Betrayed
- The Believer
- Imperium
- This Is England
- Romper Stomper
- BlacKkKlansman
- NSU German History X
- List of hood films
- Radical right (United States)
- Racism in the United States
- American militia movement
