= Nick Stahl =

American actor (born 1979)

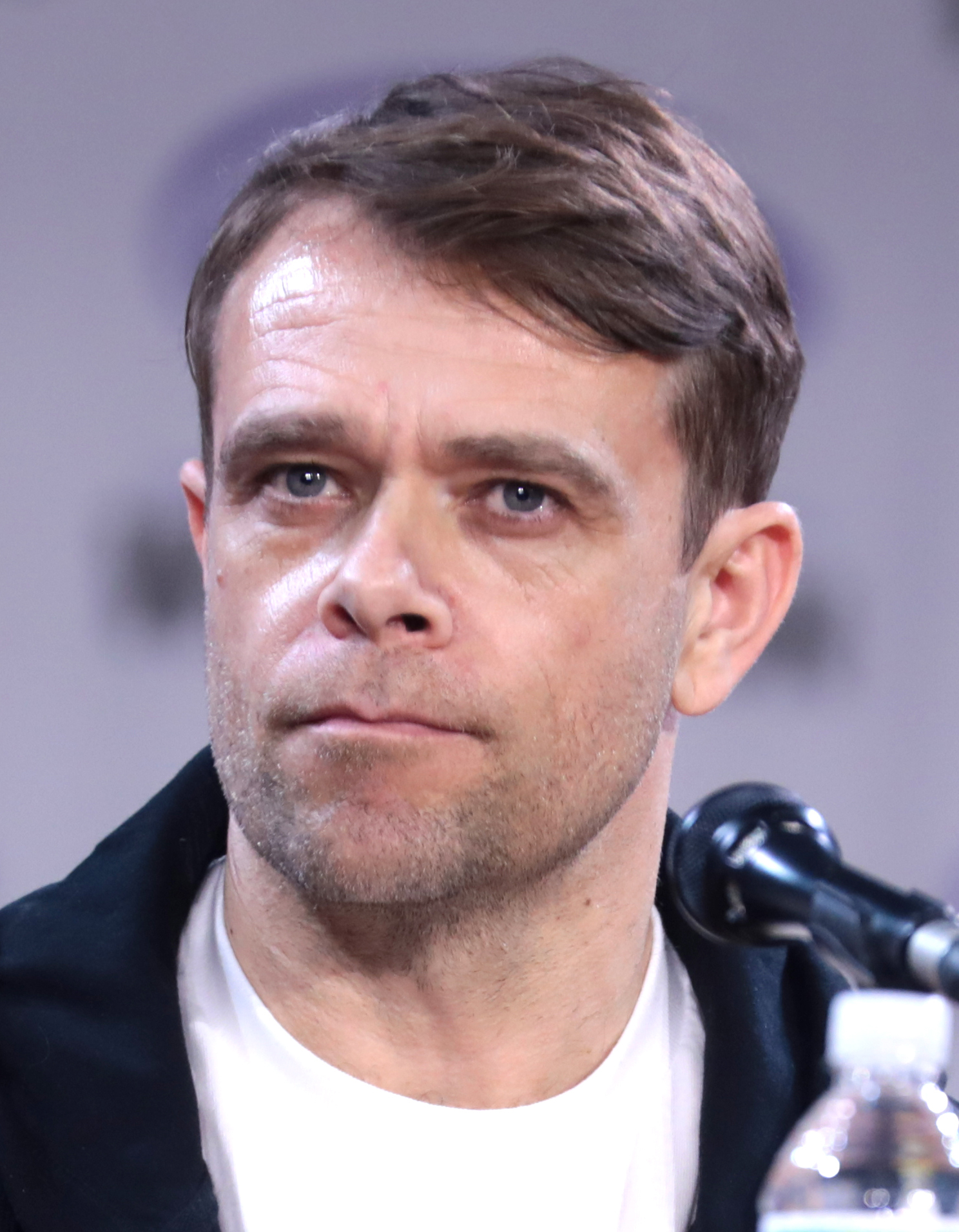
- Stahl at the 2023 WonderCon
- Born: Nicolas Kent Stahl; December 5, 1979 (age 46); Harlingen, Texas, U.S.
- Occupation: Actor
- Years active: 1991–present
- Spouse: Rose Murphy (m. 2009; div. 2019)
- Children: 1

Nicolas Kent Stahl (born December 5, 1979) is an American actor. Starting out as a child actor, he gained recognition for his performance in the 1993 film The Man Without a Face, in which he was directed by and starred alongside Mel Gibson.

Stahl later transitioned into adult roles in the films Disturbing Behavior, The Thin Red Line, In the Bedroom, Bully, Sin City, and Terminator 3: Rise of the Machines in the role of John Connor.

On television, he starred as Ben Hawkins in the HBO series Carnivàle, Jason Riley in the AMC television series Fear the Walking Dead, and Lucas in the Hulu television miniseries Tiny Beautiful Things.

== Early life ==
Stahl was born in Harlingen, Texas, the son of Donna Lynn (née Reed), a brokerage assistant, and William Kent Stahl, a businessman who abandoned his family before Nick was born. Stahl stated in a 2021 interview, "I don’t know my dad. I never met him." He was raised in Dallas along with his two sisters by his divorced mother, who struggled to make ends meet.

== Career ==
Stahl's first professional castings were small roles in Stranger at My Door (1991) and Woman With a Past (1992), although he had been acting in children's plays since he was four years old. The 1993 film The Man Without a Face, directed by and co-starring Mel Gibson, helped boost Stahl's career at the age of 13. The following year, he had a supporting role in the ensemble film Safe Passage. In 1996, he played the role of Puck in Benjamin Britten's opera A Midsummer Night's Dream at The Metropolitan Opera in New York.

In 1998, he played a doomed young soldier during the World War II Pacific War in The Thin Red Line. He scored critical and box office success again with his role in the 2001 movie In the Bedroom, which starred Sissy Spacek and Tom Wilkinson as his parents. Stahl achieved box office success again in Terminator 3: Rise of the Machines (2003) as John Connor (replacing Edward Furlong from Terminator 2: Judgment Day), co-starring with Arnold Schwarzenegger and Claire Danes. Also in the same year, he starred in the HBO series Carnivàle, which drew a loyal audience as well as rave reviews. The show lasted two seasons, ending in 2005.

Stahl has played two villains to good reviews: Bobby Kent in the film Bully (2001) and Roark Junior / Yellow Bastard in Sin City (2005). Stahl did not reprise his role as John Connor in Terminator Salvation, with Christian Bale taking over instead. Stahl noted the film's concept as "a jump to the future, so John Connor will be quite a bit older."

Stahl's other film roles included How to Rob a Bank (2007), Sleepwalking and Quid Pro Quo (both in 2008), Mirrors 2, the sequel to Mirrors, and On the Inside (both in 2010), Afghan Luke (2011), and Away from Here (2014).

In 2019, Stahl portrayed serial killer Glen Edward Rogers in The Murder of Nicole Brown Simpson. Filming commenced over the summer in 2018 and the film was released in the UK on December 9, 2019. Also in the same year, Stahl appeared in The Lumineers’ short film, III, which is based on their album of the same name. Stahl played the character Jimmy Sparks, who is a father and gambling addict.

In November 2021, The Hollywood Reporter reported that Stahl would star alongside Sean Bean, Mark Dacascos, and Famke Janssen in the film Knights of the Zodiac, a live-action adaptation of the Saint Seiya manga series. The film was released on May 12, 2023. In April 2023, he appeared in a recurring role as Lucas on the Hulu television miniseries Tiny Beautiful Things, opposite Kathryn Hahn. In May 2024, Stahl starred in the suspense horror film What You Wish For, written and directed by Nicholas Tomnay and distributed by Magnolia Pictures.

== Personal life ==
Stahl married actress and singer Rose Murphy in June 2009. They have a daughter, Marlo, born in 2010. The couple separated in 2012 and finalized their divorce in 2019.

Stahl struggled with alcoholism for decades. He spent time in rehabilitation facilities in 2007 and 2009. In May 2012, Stahl's wife reported him missing. It was later reported that Stahl had checked into a rehabilitation facility. On December 27, 2012, Stahl was arrested at an adult film store in Hollywood, California, on suspicion of committing a lewd act. No charges were filed due to insufficient evidence. On June 28, 2013, Stahl was arrested in Hollywood for alleged possession of methamphetamine.

In a 2017 interview at the Dallas Comic Show, Stahl stated he had moved to Texas and was taking a leave of absence from acting to concentrate on family and sobriety. Stahl returned to acting in 2019 with the filming of The Murder of Nicole Brown Simpson. In 2021, Stahl said in an interview that he had been sober for four years.

== Filmography ==
=== Film ===
Year	Title	Role	Notes
1993	The Man Without a Face	Chuck Norstadt	
1994	Safe Passage	Simon Singer	
1995	Tall Tale	Daniel Hackett	
1997	Eye of God	Tom Spencer	
1998	Disturbing Behavior	Gavin Strick	
1998	Soundman	Tommy Pepin	
1998	The Thin Red Line	Pfc. Edward Bead	
2000	Lover's Prayer	Vladimir	
2000	Sunset Strip	Zach	
2001	In the Bedroom	Frank Fowler	
2001	The Sleepy Time Gal	Morgan	
2001	Bully	Bobby Kent	
2002	Taboo	Christian Turner	Direct-to-video
2003	Bookies	Toby Winter	
2003	Terminator 3: Rise of the Machines	John Connor	
2003	Twist	Artful Dodger	
2005	Sin City	Roark Junior / Yellow Bastard	
2006	The Night of the White Pants	Horace "Raff" Rafferty	
2007	How to Rob a Bank	Jason Taylor / Jinx	
2008	Quid Pro Quo	Isaac Knott	
2008	Sleepwalking	James Reedy	
2009	My One and Only	Bud	
2010	The Chameleon	Brendan Kerrigan	
2010	Burning Palms	Robert Kane	
2010	Meskada	Noah Cordin	
2010	Dead Awake	Dylan	
2010	Kalamity	Billy Klepack	
2010	Mirrors 2	Max Matheson	Direct-to-video
2010	Everything Will Happen Before You Die	Hunter Robinson	
2011	The Speed of Thought	Joshua Lazarus	
2011	Afghan Luke	Luke Benning	
2011	388 Arletta Avenue	James Deakin	
2012	On the Inside	Allen Meneric	Direct-to-video
2014	Away from Here	James	
2019	III	Jimmy Sparks	Short film
2019	The Murder of Nicole Brown Simpson	Glen Edward Rogers	
2020	Hunter Hunter	Lou	
2021	What Josiah Saw	Eli Graham	
2021	American Dream	Yuri	
2021	Grace and Grit	Bob Doty	
2021	Night Blooms	Wayne	
2023	Knights of the Zodiac	Cassios	
2023	Confidential Informant	Mike Thorton	
2023	What You Wish For	Ryan	
2024	Keep Quiet	Darius Humphrey	
2025	Violent Ends	Tuck Whitehead	
TBA	Devoted	TBA	Post-production

=== Television ===
Year	Title	Role	Notes
1991	Stranger at My Door	Robert Fortier	Television film
1992	Woman with a Past	Brian	Television film
1994	Incident in a Small Town	John Bell Trenton	Television film
1995	Blue River	Young Edward Sellars	Television film
1996	My Son Is Innocent	Eric Sutter	Television film
1996	Out of Order	Unknown	Episode: "Hey Joey"
1997	Promised Land	Billy Sullivan	Episode: "Cowboy Blues"
1999	Seasons of Love	Grover Linthorne	Television film
2002	Wasted	Chris	Television film
2003–2005	Carnivàle	Ben Hawkins	Main role; 24 episodes
2009	Law & Order: Special Victims Unit	Peter Harrison	Episode: "Zebras"
2011	Locke & Key	Duncan Locke	Unaired pilot
2012	House of Lies	Kurt	Episode: "Mini Mogul"
2012	Body of Proof	Marcel Trevino	2 episodes
2021	Fear the Walking Dead	Jason Riley	5 episodes
2021	Animal Kingdom	Mike	5 episodes
2022	Dead in the Water: A Fear the Walking Dead Story	Jason Riley	Web series; main role
2022	Let the Right One In	Matthew	Main role
2023	Tiny Beautiful Things	Lucas	Miniseries; recurring role
2027	Heated Rivalry	Curtis Barrett	Season 2

=== Music videos ===
Year	Artist	Role	Notes
2019	The Lumineers	Jimmy Sparks	4 videos

== Awards and nominations ==
Year	Award	Category	Work	Results
1994	Young Artist Award	Best Youth Actor Co-Starring in a Motion Picture Drama	The Man Without a Face	Nominated
1999	Satellite Awards	Best Cast – Motion Picture	The Thin Red Line	Won
2001	Awards Circuit Community Awards	Best Cast Ensemble	In the Bedroom	Nominated
2002	Screen Actors Guild Awards	Outstanding Performance by a Cast in a Motion Picture	In the Bedroom	Nominated
2003	Prism Award	Performance in TV Movie or Miniseries	Wasted	Nominated
2004	Satellite Awards	Best Actor – Television Series Drama	Carnivàle	Nominated
2004	Saturn Awards	Best Supporting Actor on Television	Carnivàle	Nominated
2005	Genie Awards	Best Performance by an Actor in a Leading Role	Twist	Nominated
2006	Gold Derby Awards	Ensemble Cast	Sin City	Nominated
2006	Critics Choice Awards	Best Acting Ensemble	Sin City	Nominated
2021	Brooklyn Horror Film Festival	Best Actor	What Josiah Saw	Won
2021	Mammoth Lakes Film Festival	Best Cast	What Josiah Saw	Won
