= Murder of Bobby Kent =

1993 murder of Iranian American man in Florida, US

Bobby Kent
- Kent in 1992
- Born: Bobby Khayam; May 12, 1973; Hollywood, Florida, U.S.
- Died: July 14, 1993 (aged 20); Weston, Florida, U.S.
- Cause of death: Homicide (multiple stabbings, throat slashing, and bludgeoning)

Bobby Kent (né Khayam; May 12, 1973 – July 14, 1993) was a 20-year-old American man who was murdered by seven people, including his best friend, Martin Joseph "Marty" Puccio Jr (born March 21, 1973) in Weston, Florida. The murder was adapted into the 2001 film Bully.

== Events before the murder ==
Bobby Kent, the son of Iranian immigrants Fred and Farah Kent (original surname was Khayam), attended South Broward High School in the South Florida suburb of Hollywood, Florida. According to Tim Donnelly, who prosecuted all the conspirators for this murder, one attorney described Kent as "like Eddie Haskell. All the parents loved him in the neighborhood, but the kids all looked at him a different way."

Marty Puccio is an Italian-American, and was raised Catholic. Kent and Puccio had known each other since third grade, when they had lived on the same block in Hollywood, Florida. They were good friends as teenagers. Bad blood, however, existed between the two. Puccio felt "ill-will and hatred" towards Kent, who would bully and pummel him.

Kent and Puccio had experimented with making gay porn movies, hoping to distribute them to local shops. Neither Kent nor Puccio actually participated in these movies, but, rather, directed them and coaxed a man in his 40s to perform on camera. Kent tried to peddle a movie, titled Rough Boys, to porn shops across South Florida. None took him up on the offer, due to the poor audio and video quality as well as the lack of any sexual activities in the film beyond the man dancing nude and playing with a dildo.

== Murder ==
Toward the beginning of 1993, Puccio (aged 20) began dating Lisa Connelly (aged 18). Frustrated by how much time Puccio spent with Kent (aged 20) as well as Kent's treatment of Puccio, Connelly tried to distract Kent from Puccio by setting up her friend Alice "Ali" Willis (aged 17) with Kent. Kent and Willis dated for a few weeks, but she ultimately ended the relationship because he was abusive. In June, Puccio confided to Connelly that Kent had been abusive to him quite often over the years. Connelly tried to convince him to end the friendship, but Puccio seemed hesitant. By this time, Connelly knew she was pregnant with Puccio's child (refusing to believe it might be Kent's—with whom she had also had sex), and was determined to pursue a permanent relationship with Puccio, who to her was "the Impossible Dream, the God of the Beach". The night before the murder, Alice Willis claimed that Kent had raped her.

Connelly decided that Kent needed to be eliminated permanently, and began talking to Puccio and other friends about murdering him. On July 13, 1993, Connelly called Willis and told her that "Bobby Kent was planning to come to Palm Bay, Florida, where Willis was living, to murder her and smother her baby [by a previous relationship], unless she returned to Broward County to date him again." Willis claimed Connelly asked her to come to Connelly's house to discuss murdering Bobby Kent. Willis went to Connelly's house and brought two friends, her current boyfriend, Donald "Donny" Semenec (aged 17), and Heather Swallers (aged 18).

On the night of July 13, 1993, Puccio, Semenec, Swallers, Connelly and Willis met with Kent. Puccio, Semenec, and Swallers became uncomfortable and left. Connelly and Willis decided to lure Kent to a new development under construction, in nearby Weston, with the promise that he would be able to drive Willis' Mustang 5.0 and have sex with her. Connelly had brought along her mother's pistol, intending to kill Kent while he was distracted by sexual activity with Willis, but was unable to go through with shooting him.

Despite the failed attempt, Connelly still wanted Kent dead. Seeking assistance, she contacted a self-proclaimed hitman named Derek Kaufman (aged 20), who had been recommended by a friend of Willis. The group met Kaufman at his home in Rolling Oaks. They wanted him to get a gun so they could kill Kent that night, but Kaufman told them he could not procure a weapon that quickly. Willis, Connelly, Semenec and Swallers then went back to Connelly's house and were joined by her cousin, Derek Dzvirko (aged 19). The group continued to discuss their plans, and ultimately decided to go ahead with murdering Kent the next night, with Kaufman's assistance.

Late on the night of July 14, 1993, the seven met at Puccio's house and finalized their plans. Puccio contacted Kent and convinced him to come out with the group that night, with the promise that they would race their cars and that Willis wanted to have sex with him again. The group assembled their weapons: between them, they had two knives, a lead pipe, and a baseball bat. Around 11:30 p.m., they picked Kent up from his home and headed out to a construction site.

When they arrived at the site, Willis, in accordance with the plan, took Kent off to a secluded spot where they were talking. Swallers joined them there. While she and Willis distracted Kent, Semenec came up and stabbed Kent in the back of the neck with a knife. When Kent asked for Puccio's help, Puccio stuck a knife in Kent's stomach. Kent yelled out an apology, but Puccio continued to stab him. When Kent tried to flee, Puccio, Semenec, and Derek Kaufman followed him and continued wounding him. Puccio then slit Kent's throat and hit his head against the ground. Kaufman then approached and hit Kent in the head with the baseball bat, which was the final blow. After this, Dzvirko, Semenec, Puccio, and Kaufman helped dump Kent's body on the edge of the shore of the marsh, in the belief that alligators would eat the decaying body.

== Aftermath ==
In the days following the crime, many of the conspirators confessed to various other people. Connelly confessed to her mother, who contacted her sister, Dzvirko's mother. Together, the two mothers called in their brother, Joe Scrima (uncle to the young Connelly and Dzvirko), who had friends in the police department they thought would know what to do. Scrima's friends put them in touch with Detective Frank Ilarraza of the Broward County Sheriff's Office, and Dzvirko confessed everything. As proof, he led Ilarraza to Kent's body.

== Adjudications ==
Of the seven perpetrators, three will be in Florida prisons for life:

- Martin Puccio was found guilty of first-degree murder and conspiracy to commit murder; in August 1995, he was sentenced to death by electrocution, plus a concurrent 30-year sentence for conspiracy. In 1997, the Supreme Court of Florida ruled that Puccio should not be executed due to mitigating factors, so his death sentence was vacated and he was resentenced to life in prison, concurrent with his existing 30-year sentence for conspiracy, with parole eligibility occurring in 25 years. As of January 2026, he remains in custody at the Everglades Correctional Institution, 20 miles (32 km) inland from Miami, Florida.
- Donald Semenec was found guilty of second-degree murder, but at his May 1995 sentencing, the judge chose to give him the equivalent of a first-degree murder sentence of life in prison. As of January 2026, he remains in custody at the Okeechobee Correctional Institution, 10 miles (16 km) north of Okeechobee, Florida.
- Derek Kaufman was found guilty of first-degree murder and conspiracy to commit murder; in June 1995, he was sentenced to life in prison without parole for 25 years, plus a consecutive 30-year sentence for conspiracy. As of January 2026, he remains in custody at the Marion Correctional Institution, 10 miles (16 km) north of Ocala, Florida.

The four remaining perpetrators had all been released from Florida prisons by February 2004:

- Lisa Connelly, who with Alice Willis was the driving force behind the murder conspiracy, provided evidence and was found guilty of second-degree murder and conspiracy to commit aggravated battery with a deadly weapon (a lesser charge than conspiracy to commit murder), but at her July 1995 sentencing, the judge chose to give her the equivalent of a first-degree murder sentence of life in prison, plus a concurrent 5-year sentence for conspiracy. Her sentence was overturned on appeal as unduly harsh, and was reduced in 1998 to 22 years. After having served less than 9 years, she was released in February 2004. As of 2013, she was a certified optician living in Pennsylvania, was married and had a then-6-year-old child, in addition to her then-19-year-old daughter with Puccio, who was born while Connelly and Puccio were both in jail pending their murder and conspiracy trials.
- Alice Willis, who with Lisa Connelly was the driving force behind the murder conspiracy, was found guilty of second-degree murder and conspiracy to commit murder; in May 1995, she was sentenced to 40 years in prison, plus a concurrent 15-year sentence for conspiracy. The murder sentence was reduced on appeal to 17 years, to be followed by 40 years of probation. After having served less than 7 years, she was released in September 2001. As of 2013, she was a homemaker and parent living in Florida.
- Derek Dzvirko, who led police to Kent's body and provided other evidence, pleaded guilty to second-degree murder and conspiracy to commit murder; in May 1995, he was sentenced to concurrent terms of 11 years in prison. After having served less than 5 years, he was released in October 1999. As of 2013, he was a former long-haul truck driver who had settled in Missouri in 2009 as a single parent to raise his daughter.
- Heather Swallers, who cooperated with police and provided evidence, pleaded guilty to second-degree murder and conspiracy to commit murder; in May 1995, she was sentenced to concurrent terms of 7 years in prison. After having served less than 3 years, she was released in February 1998. As of 2013, she was living in Georgia.

== In popular culture ==
Jim Schutze, a reporter with the Houston Chronicle, wrote the 1997 best-selling true crime book Bully: A True Story of High School Revenge.

The book was adapted by David McKenna (credited under the pseudonym "Zachary Long", after he demanded his name be removed from the film) and Roger Pullis into the 2001 film Bully, directed by Larry Clark. In the film, Kent was portrayed by Nick Stahl, Puccio was portrayed by Brad Renfro, Willis was portrayed by Bijou Phillips, Connelly was portrayed by Rachel Miner, Semenec was portrayed by Michael Pitt, Swallers was portrayed by Kelli Garner, Dzvirko was portrayed by Daniel Franzese, and Kaufman was portrayed by Leo Fitzpatrick.

The story was covered on American Justice, Forensic Files, and Murder Among Friends. The 2001 Forensic Files episode, "Payback", includes an interview with Derek Dzvirko about the murder.
