= David McKenna (writer) =

American screenwriter and producer (born 1968)

- Born: 14 August 1968 (age 58); San Diego, California
- Occupations: Screenwriter; producer
- Writing career
- Language: English

David McKenna is an American screenwriter and producer. He wrote the screenplays for American History X (1998), Blow (2001) and S.W.A.T. (2003). He is also a film professor at Columbia University and Barnard College.

== Career ==
McKenna wrote and sold American History X when he was 26. It drew from his upbringing around the punk music scene, as well as interviews with real skinheads. The film became the focus of a post-production dispute between director Tony Kaye and lead actor Edward Norton. Made on a budget of $20 million, the film grossed $24 million at the worldwide box office. He then wrote the screenplays for Blow, about American cocaine smuggler George Jung, and Get Carter, a remake of the 1971 film of the same name, starring Michael Caine. Also in 2001, his adaptation of the book Bully: A True Story of High School Revenge by Jim Schutze was released as Bully. The book and film were based on the 1993 murder of Bobby Kent. McKenna was unhappy with the finished film, and chose to be credited under the pseudonym Zachary Long.

He was also the creator and Executive Producer of NBC's E-Ring (2005–2006). The show starred Benjamin Bratt as Major James Tisnewski, a former Delta Force operator and Dennis Hopper as Colonel Eli McNulty, as officers working in the E-ring of the Pentagon in the Special Operations Division (SOD) – planning and co-ordinating covert US special operations actions around the globe. The show struggled from the onset because it was up against ABC's Top 20 hit Lost, CBS's Top 30 hit Criminal Minds, FOX's Top 10 hit American Idol and the network's Top 30 hit Unan1mous. Although NBC gave it an earlier time slot which led to better ratings, the show was pulled from the lineup during the February sweeps and officially canceled at the NBC upfront on May 15.

McKenna also ventured into video games, writing the script for the 2006 open world action-adventure video game Scarface: The World Is Yours. The game is not a direct adaptation of the 1983 film directed by Brian De Palma, but is instead a broad strokes sequel which changes the ending of the film.

== Filmography ==
=== Film ===
Year	Film	Writer	Producer	Notes
1998	American History X	Yes	Yes	Co-Producer
1999	Body Shots	Yes	No	
2000	Get Carter	Yes	No	
2001	Blow	Yes	No	Co-Wrote screenplay with Nick Cassavetes
2001	Bully	Yes	No	Credited as Zachary Long
2003	S.W.A.T.	Yes	No	Co-Wrote screenplay with David Ayer
2017	Cocaine Godmother	Yes	Yes	Co-Wrote Screenplay with Molly McAlpine, executive producer
2020	Embattled	Yes	No	
TBA	Cabo	Yes	No	

=== Television ===
Year	Title	Writer	Producer	Creator	Notes
2005–2006	E-Ring	Yes	Yes	Yes	Co-creator, writer, executive producer

=== Video games ===
- Scarface: The World Is Yours (2006)
