= Cary Elwes filmography =

List of films featuring Cary Elwes

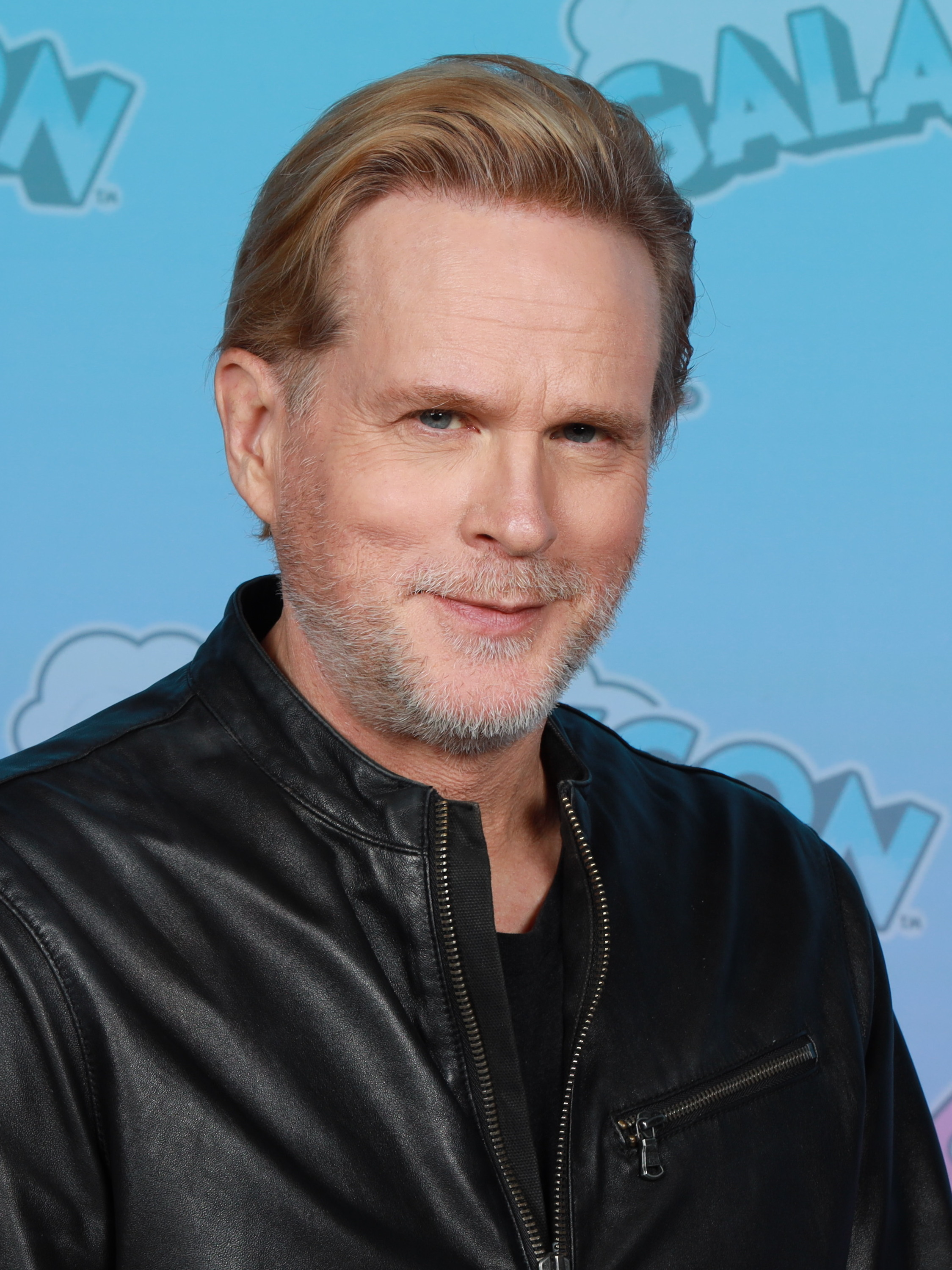
- Elwes at GalaxyCon Richmond in 2025
- Film: 95
- Television: 39
- Others: 3 video games

Cary Elwes is an English actor known for his performances in various projects including film, television, and video games.

His film roles include Westley in The Princess Bride (1987), Major Cabot Forbes in Glory (1989), Russ Wheeler in Days of Thunder (1990), Lieutenant Kent Gregory in Hot Shots! (1991), Lord Arthur Holmwood in Bram Stoker's Dracula (1992), Robin Hood in Robin Hood: Men in Tights (1993), Dr. Jonas Miller in Twister (1996), Jerry in Liar Liar (1997), Detective Nick Ruskin in Kiss the Girls (1997), Fritz Arno "Fritzy" Wagner in Shadow of the Vampire (2000), Thomas H. Ince in The Cat's Meow (2001), Sir Edgar in Ella Enchanted (2004), Dr. Lawrence Gordon in the Saw series, Karol Wojtyla in Pope John Paul II (2005), Dr. Steven Metzner in No Strings Attached (2011), Jacques Christoffersen in Burning at Both Ends (2022), Carl Yankowski in BlackBerry (2023), and Denlinger in Mission: Impossible – Dead Reckoning Part One (2023) and Mission: Impossible – The Final Reckoning (2025).

Elwes has also appeared on television in a number of series, including as David Lukner in Seinfeld (1996), Michael Collins in From the Earth to the Moon (1998), FBI Assistant Director Brad Follmer in The X-Files (2001–2002), Pierre Despereaux in Psych (2009–2014), Professor Sinclair Wilde in Life in Pieces (2016–2017), Mayor Larry Kline in Stranger Things (2019), Gavin Hawk in The Marvelous Mrs. Maisel (2019), and "Pistol" Pete Whipple in Knuckles (2024).

== Film ==
Key
†	Denotes projects that have not yet been released

List of film and roles
Year	Title	Role	Notes	Reference(s)
1979	Yesterday's Hero	Disco Dancer		
1984	Another Country	James Harcourt		
1984	Oxford Blues	Lionel		
1985	The Bride	Captain Josef Schoden		
1986	Lady Jane	Guilford Dudley		
1987	Maschenka	Lev Glebovich Ganin		
1987	The Princess Bride	Westley / Dread Pirate Roberts / The Man in Black		
1989	Never on Tuesday	Tow Truck Driver	Uncredited	
1989	Glory	Major Cabot Forbes		
1990	Days of Thunder	Russ Wheeler		
1991	Hot Shots!	Lieutenant Kent Gregory		
1992	Bram Stoker's Dracula	Lord Arthur Holmwood		
1992	Leather Jackets	Dobbs	Also associate producer	
1993	Robin Hood: Men in Tights	Robin Hood		
1993	The Crush	Nick Eliot		
1994	The Jungle Book	Captain William Boone		
1994	The Chase	Steve Horsegroovy		
1996	Twister	Dr. Jonas Miller		
1997	Kiss the Girls	Detective Nick Ruskin		
1997	The Informant	Lieutenant David Ferris		
1997	Liar Liar	Jerry		
1998	The Pentagon Wars	Lieutenant Colonel James Burton		
1998	Quest for Camelot	Garrett	Voice	
1999	Cradle Will Rock	John Houseman		
2000	Shadow of the Vampire	Fritz Arno "Fritzy" Wagner		
2001	The Cat's Meow	Thomas H. Ince		
2002	Wish You Were Dead	Mac "Macbeth" Wilson		
2002	Comic Book Villains	Carter	Also co-producer	
2003	Porco Rosso	Donald Curtis	Voice; English dub	
2004	Saw	Dr. Lawrence Gordon		
2004	Ella Enchanted	Sir Edgar		
2004	The Riverman	Ted Bundy		
2004	American Crime	Albert Bodine		
2005	Edison Force	District Attorney Jack Reigert		
2005	Neo Ned	Dr. Magnuson		
2005	National Lampoon's Pucked	Norman		
2005	The Cat Returns	Baron Humbert von Gikkingen	Voice; English dub	
2006	Factory Girl	Sam Green	Uncredited	
2006	Whisper of the Heart	Baron Humbert von Gikkingen	Voice; English dub	
2007	Walk the Talk	Erik	Also executive producer	
2007	Georgia Rule	Arnold		
2008	The Alphabet Killer	Captain Kenneth Shine		
2009	A Christmas Carol	Portly Gentleman, Guest #2, Businessman #1	Voice and motion-capture	
2010	Psych 9	Dr. Clement		
2010	Flying Lessons	Steven Jennings		
2010	As Good as Dead	Ethan Belfrage		
2010	Little Murder	Barry Fitzgerald		
2010	Saw 3D	Dr. Lawrence Gordon		
2011	No Strings Attached	Dr. Steven Metzner		
2011	Delhi Safari	Bee Commander / Sultan	Voice	
2011	The Adventures of Tintin	Seaplane Pilot	Voice and motion-capture	
2011	New Year's Eve	Stan's Doctor		
2011	The Story of Luke	Uncle Paul		
2011	Camilla Dickinson	Rafferty Dickinson		
2011	Hellgate	Jeff Mathews		
2012	The Oogieloves in the Big Balloon Adventure	Bobby Wobbly		
2012	The Citizen	Earl Miller		
2013	Hansel & Gretel Get Baked	Meter Man		
2013	Behaving Badly	Joseph Stevens		
2013	Justice League: The Flashpoint Paradox	Aquaman	Voice	
2013	Armed Response	Joshua		
2014	A Bit of Bad Luck	Brooks		
2014	Reach Me	Kersey		
2015	A Mouse Tale	Sir Thaddeus	Voice	
2015	H8RZ	Principal Donato		
2015	Being Charlie	David Mills		
2015	A Haunting in Cawdor	Lawrence O'Neil		
2016	Lost & Found	John Broman		
2016	Sugar Mountain	Jim Huxley		
2016	Elvis & Nixon	—N/a	Writer and producer	
2016	Indiscretion	Jake		
2016	The Elephant Kingdom	Rock	Voice	
2016	Beyond Beyond	Jonah's Father	Voice	
2016	The Queen of Spain	Gary Jones		
2017	We Don't Belong Here	Frank Harper		
2017	Don't Sleep	Dr. Richard Sommers		
2018	Billionaire Boys Club	Andy Warhol		
2018	Ghost Light	Alex Pankhurst		
2019	Black Christmas	Professor Gelson		
2021	Best Sellers	Halpren Nolan		
2021	The Unholy	Bishop Gyles		
2021	Last Train to Christmas	Roger Towers		
2021	A Castle for Christmas	Myles, the Duke of Dunbar		
2021	Burning at Both Ends	Jacques Christoffersen	Entitled Resistance: 1942 in some territories	
2022	The Hyperions	Professor Ruckus Mandulbaum		
2023	Operation Fortune: Ruse de Guerre	Nathan Jasmine		
2023	BlackBerry	Carl Yankowski		
2023	Sweetwater	Ned Irish		
2023	Mission: Impossible – Dead Reckoning Part One	Denlinger		
2023	Rebel Moon – Part One: A Child of Fire	The King		
2024	Rebel Moon – Part Two: The Scargiver	The King		
2024	The Ministry of Ungentlemanly Warfare	Brigadier Colin Gubbins		
2025	Mission: Impossible – The Final Reckoning	Denlinger	Cameo; Flashback Scenes	
2025	Dead Man's Wire	Detective Michael Grable		
2025	The Panic	Charles Barney		
TBA	The American Spring †	TBA		

== Television ==
List of television appearances and roles
Year	Title	Role	Notes	Reference(s)
1996	Seinfeld	David Lukner	Episode: "The Wait Out"	
1998	The Pentagon Wars	Lieutenant Colonel James G. Burton	Television film	
1998	From the Earth to the Moon	Michael Collins	3 episodes	
1998	Pinky and the Brain	Director, Hamlet	Voice, 2 episodes	
1998	Hercules	Paris of Troy	Voice, episode: "Hercules and the Trojan War"	
1999	The Outer Limits	Dr. John York	Episode: "Ripper"	
1999	Batman Beyond	Paxton Powers	Voice, episode: "Ascension"	
2000	Race Against Time	Burke	Television film	
2001	Night Visions	Gerald	Episode: "Quiet Please"	
2001	Uprising	Fritz Hippler	Television film	
2001–2002	The X-Files	FBI Assistant Director Brad Follmer	6 episodes	
2004	The Riverman	Ted Bundy	Television film	
2005	Pope John Paul II	Young Karol Wojtyla	Television film	
2006	Haskett's Chance	Mark Haskett / Chris Dalness	Television film	
2007	Law & Order: Special Victims Unit	Sidney Truex	Episode: "Dependent"	
2009–2014	Psych	Pierre Despereaux	4 episodes	
2011	Wonder Woman	Henry Detmer	Unsold pilot	
2012	Leverage	Scott Roemer	Episode: "The (Very) Big Bird Job"	
2012	Perception	British Intelligence Officer	Episode: "Cipher"	
2013	The Anna Nicole Story	E. Pierce Marshall	Television film	
2014	Cosmos: A Spacetime Odyssey	Edmond Halley, Robert Hooke	Voice, episode: "When Knowledge Conquered Fear"	
2014	Granite Flats	Hugh Ashmead	4 episodes	
2014–2016	Family Guy	Himself, Dr. Watson, additional voices	6 episodes	
2015–2016	The Art of More	Arthur Davenport	20 episodes	
2015–2016	Sofia the First	Prince Roderick, Basil	Voice, 2 episodes	
2016–2017	Life in Pieces	Professor Sinclair Wilde	4 episodes	
2017	Workaholics	Fox	Episode: "The Most Dangerless Game"	
2018	Youth & Consequences	Joel Cutney	3 episodes	
2018	André the Giant	Himself	HBO documentary	
2018	The Adventures of Puss in Boots	Guy Fox	Voice, episode: "Like a Fox"	
2019	Stranger Things	Mayor Larry Kline	5 episodes	
2019	The Marvelous Mrs. Maisel	Gavin Hawk	4 episodes	
2020	Katy Keene	Leo Lacy	Episode: "Chapter Thirteen: Come Together"	
2020	Home Movie: The Princess Bride	Westley, Humperdinck	Episode: "Chapter Ten: To the Pain!"	
2024	Knuckles	"Pistol" Pete Whipple	2 episodes	
2026	Kevin	Michael	Episode: "Opening Night"; Voice	
2026	M.I.A.	Tim Kincaid	7 episodes	
TBA	Very Young Frankenstein	President of the United States		
TBA	Industry	Padgett Stillman		

== Video games ==
List of video game voice roles
Year	Title	Role	Notes	Reference(s)	Publisher
2004	The Bard's Tale	The Bard	Voice		inXile Entertainment
2007	Pirates of the Caribbean: At World's End	Black Bart	Voice		Disney Interactive Studios
2012	Epic Mickey 2: The Power of Two	Gremlin Gus	Voice		Disney Interactive Studios
