= Jinn (2014 film) =

- Directed by: Ajmal Zaheer Ahmad
- Written by: Ajmal Zaheer Ahmad
- Produced by: Benjamin Dresser
- Starring: Dominic Rains; Ray Park; William Atherton; Faran Tahir; Serinda Swan
- Cinematography: Robert Mehnert
- Edited by: Justin Hynous
- Music by: Noah Sorota
- Production company: Exxodus Pictures
- Distributed by: Freestyle Releasing
- Release date: April 4, 2014
- Running time: 97 minutes
- Country: United States
- Languages: English; Urdu; Arabic
- Box office: $297,381

Jinn is a 2014 American action-horror-thriller film written and directed by Ajmal Zaheer Ahmad, starring Dominic Rains, Ray Park, William Atherton, Faran Tahir and Serinda Swan.

== Synopsis ==
According to Dread Central, the producers claim the film will "introduce the accurate mythological concept of the jinn to Western audiences".

In the Beginning, Three were Created ...

Man made of Clay.

Angels made of Light.

And a Third ... made of Fire.

From the beginning, stories of angels and men have captured our imaginations and have been etched into our history crossing all boundaries of culture, religion, and time. These two races have dominated the landscape of modern mythology for countless centuries, almost washing away the evidence that a third ever existed. This third race, born of smokeless fire, was called the jinn. Similar to humans in many ways, the jinn live invisibly among us and only under dire or unusual circumstances do our paths ever cross.

As humans became the dominant force on Earth, contact between man and jinn steadily decreased.

Modern man has all but forgotten the jinn.

== Plot ==
In 1901, a man enters a shack in the forest to confront a jinn sitting, waiting for him, and he starts to recite an Arabic prayer to establish a layer of protection for himself as he nears. The man has only one request, the release of a girl being kept hostage by the Jinn, but the jinn refuses to answer and attacks him. After a struggle, the man throws holy water on the jinn. The jinn swears vengeance and states that he will slaughter all of his blood-line from one generation to another.

113 years later, Shawn and Jasmine are a happy couple living in Michigan. Shawn gets a delivery, an early birthday present of a note and VHS tape. Later, he tells his wife about the promotion at his job, and that he thinks they're ready to have their first child, but Jasmine tells him that it's impossible for her to have children, upsetting Shawn. He leaves to think, and in his office he watches the VHS tape. The tape was recorded by his father, with the message that strange things might start happening to him, and he must seek out the helpers who will get him ready to fight the unknown forces. His Father also states that if this tape has managed to reach him, that means he has failed to defeat these forces and protect his family, and that Shawn will now need to prevail in this battle to ensure survival of his family.

When he gets home, he finds the furniture stacked up and his wife missing. He calls the police but Jasmine arrives, to his relief. When more odd things begin happening at home, the couple meets Father Westhoff and Gabriel, who explain the concept of jinn to them. Shawn doesn't believe this, but is prompted by Father Westhoff to visit his adoptive parents. He does so and is surprised to have Father Westhoff's story corroborated. They are then attacked by an unseen force that takes Jasmine. Shawn sets off with Gabriel to gather information from Ali, Shawn's estranged uncle. As Ali is of the same bloodline, the Jinns have tormented him, and his failure to defeat the Jinns has driven him mad. Ali, through his supernatural power, shows Shawn that his wife is pregnant. Ali warn Shawn that to save himself and his family, he will have to pass the Chilla (Physical, Mental & Spiritual test) and defeat the Jinns. Ali senses that the jinn has been spying on them and is there to attack him. As they flee, Gabriel sacrifices himself for Shawn. It is revealed that Gabriel is a jinn, though he dies in the fight with the other jinn.

Now relying solely on Father Westhoff for help, Shawn finds out the reason the jinn are after him, and Father Westhoff sends him on a quest to learn how to defeat the jinn. Shawn manages to draw the jinn to a scheduled place for their final battle. The Jinns try several physical tortures and mental deceptions, but Shawn manages to survive the Chilla, and he must next confront the main jinn from his great-grandfather's clash over 100 years ago. Ali fights alongside him, but it appears the jinn is only toying with them. Eventually, though, Shawn finally defeats the jinn. Jinns from different dimensions come and ask Shawn for peace but Shawn wants them to leave him alone. He kills one of them as a warning to the others. Father Westhoff shows him that Jasmine is safe in the church, along with the now revived Gabriel.

A year later, Shawn, Jasmine, and Ali are at the apartment with the couple's new baby boy. The baby drops his pacifier, and as Ali and Shawn both bend down to pick it up, it moves to the baby's mouth without being touched. They look at each other, knowing that the child has the power to defeat the jinn once and for all.

== Cast ==
- Dominic Rains as Shawn Walker / Jehangir Amin / Doppelganger Jinn
- Ray Park as Gabriel
- William Atherton as Father Westhoff
- Faran Tahir as Ali Amin
- Serinda Swan as Jasmine Walker
- Ajmal Zaheer Ahmad as Zaheer Amin
- Arman Pirzada as Young Shawn
- Imtiaz Ahmad as Baby Jehan
- Dennis North as Owen Walker
- Milica Govich as Milla Walker
- Jaan Ahmad as Village Woman

== Production ==
=== Development ===
A car known as the Firebreather was created for the film. The car was unveiled to the public at the Autorama in Detroit on February 26, 2010. Designed by Ajmal Zaheer Ahmad, the Firebreather is based on the fifth generation Chevrolet Camaro made to resemble the second generation Pontiac Firebird Trans Am.

=== Filming ===
Shooting began in March 2010, and wrapped in May. Some of the shooting for the film occurred at the University of Michigan Law Quad. The film was released on April 4, 2014.

== Reception ==
Critical reception of Jinn was negative, with a Rotten Tomatoes approval rating of 18% based on 11 reviews. The film also has a Metacritic score of 24 out of 100, based on five reviews. Joe Leydon of Variety commented on his review that "This ponderously paced, needlessly convoluted and altogether unexceptional thriller will be fortunate to reach beyond a thin sliver of undiscriminating genre fans with its bogus mythos about ancient evil spirits bent on world domination." Frank Scheck of The Hollywood Reporter wrote on his review that "despite the exoticism of its mythology, Jinn proves itself a typically formulaic B-movie exercise that will have little resonance for those unfamiliar with its inspiration." Peter Keough of The Boston Globe wrote: "With its awful acting, terrible dialogue, and laughable special effects, Jinn strains for the hapless genius of Ed Wood, but ends up just another bad movie."
