= Kelli Garner =

American actress (born 1984)

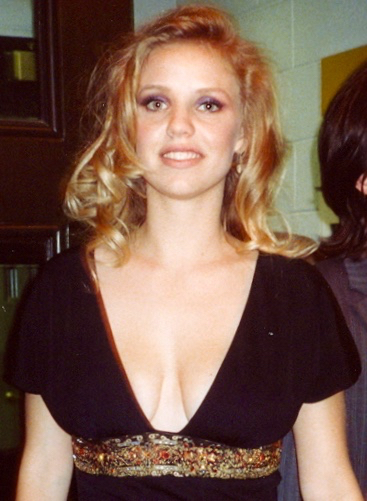
- Garner in 2005
- Born: Kelli Brianne Garner; April 11, 1984 (age 42); Bakersfield, California, U.S.
- Occupation: Actress
- Years active: 2000–present

Kelli Brianne Garner (born April 11, 1984) is an American actress who has appeared in a variety of independent and mainstream films, television, and theater.

A native of Southern California, Garner made her feature film debut at age 16 in Larry Clark's thriller Bully (2001), followed by a supporting role as Faith Domergue in Martin Scorsese's The Aviator (2004). In 2005, she made her New York stage debut in an off-Broadway production of Dog Sees God. Over the following several years, Garner had lead roles in the independent film Thumbsucker (2005), the studio comedy Man of the House (2005), and the comedy-drama Lars and the Real Girl (2007). She returned to theater in 2008, appearing in an off-Broadway production of The Seagull opposite Dianne Wiest.

Garner subsequently had a supporting role in the Disney animated film G-Force (2009), and from 2011 to 2012, had a lead role on the short-lived period drama Pan Am, portraying a flight attendant. She later co-starred in Alexandre Aja's fantasy horror film Horns (2014) opposite Daniel Radcliffe. In 2015, Garner portrayed Marilyn Monroe in the television film The Secret Life of Marilyn Monroe, opposite Susan Sarandon. She subsequently guest-starred on the series Looking (2014–2015) before starring as the lead on the NBC drama series The Enemy Within, which ran for one season in 2019. She also had a minor role in the monster film Godzilla: King of the Monsters (2019).

== Early life ==
Garner was born on April 11, 1984, in Bakersfield, California, and spent her early childhood in Newbury Park before her family settled in Thousand Oaks. Although she described herself as a "shy" young girl, Garner caught the attention of a talent agent while attending a friend's bar mitzvah, and was subsequently cast in an Eggo commercial. While a student at Thousand Oaks High School, Garner was cast in director Mike Mills's short film Architecture of Assurance in 2000. Garner was a talented soccer player in high school, and had planned on pursuing it as a career before she began working as an actress.

== Career ==
Garner had appeared in several short films before being cast in a supporting role in the television film Time Share in 2000. In 2000, she was cast in Larry Clark's controversial crime thriller Bully (2001), in which she portrayed Heather Swallers, a teenager who participates with her friends in an orchestrated murder of one of their peers; Clark cast Garner in the film after seeing her performance in Architecture of Assurance. The film, which was based on the real-life 1993 murder of Bobby Kent, received critical acclaim.

Her next major role came at age 19 in Martin Scorsese's The Aviator (2004), in which she portrayed actress Faith Domergue, opposite Leonardo DiCaprio as Howard Hughes. According to Garner, she wore brown contact lenses to her audition to further embody Domergue; she has said that she tripped and fell when entering the audition room in front of Scorsese and DiCaprio. "I thought I'd lost the job," she recalled, "But I think it was that moment that made it work [because] the character was someone who was trying to be much older than she was." The next year, she appeared in the comedy Man of the House, and the independent teen drama Thumbsucker (2005), opposite Lou Taylor Pucci and Vince Vaughn. She had supporting parts in the independent films London (2005) and Dreamland (2006), the latter of which earned her a Best Actress award at Method Fest Independent Film Festival, shared with co-star Agnes Bruckner.

In December 2005, Garner starred in the off-Broadway production of Dog Sees God: Confessions of a Teenage Blockhead at the Century Center for the Performing Arts, co-starring with America Ferrera, Eddie Kaye Thomas, and Ari Graynor, among others. She later appeared in the Green Day music video "Jesus of Suburbia" (with Thumbsucker co-star Lou Taylor Pucci).

In 2007, Garner appeared in a lead role in the critically acclaimed drama Lars and the Real Girl as Ryan Gosling's co-worker and love interest. In 2008, she appeared again onstage in an off-Broadway production of Anton Chekhov's The Seagull opposite Dianne Wiest, as Nina. Ben Brantley of The New York Times, though critical of some elements of the production, praised Garner's performance among her younger co-stars. She had a minor part in the comedy Taking Woodstock (2009), and in the Disney film G-Force (2009), which she followed with a supporting role in Going the Distance (2010), opposite Drew Barrymore. Between 2011 and 2012, she had a main role as Kate Cameron on the period series Pan Am, opposite Christina Ricci.

Garner was next cast in Alexandre Aja's horror-fantasy Horns (2014) with Daniel Radcliffe, and played the title role in the Lifetime miniseries The Secret Life of Marilyn Monroe, opposite Susan Sarandon as her mother. She also appeared in the independent film One More Time (2015) with Christopher Walken and Amber Heard. Between 2014 and 2015, she had a guest-starring role on the gay-themed series Looking, playing the sister of the lead character, Patrick Murray. In 2019, Garner had a supporting part in the action film Godzilla: King of the Monsters, and also starred as a lead opposite Jennifer Carpenter and Morris Chestnut on the series The Enemy Within.

== Filmography ==
=== Film ===
Year	Title	Role	Director(s)	Notes	Ref.
2001	Bully	Heather Swallers	Larry Clark		
2002	Love Liza	Huffer Girl	Todd Louiso		
2002	Hometown Legend	Josie	James Anderson		
2002	Outside	The Girl	Jeff Mahler		
2004	The Aviator	Faith Domergue	Martin Scorsese		
2005	The Toast	Bride	Kevin McDermott		
2005	Thumbsucker	Rebecca	Mike Mills		
2005	Man of the House	Barbara 'Barb' Thompson	Stephen Herek		
2005	London	Maya	Hunter Richards		
2005	Piggy Banks	Archer	Morgan J. Freeman	Also known as: Born Killers	
2006	Dreamland	Calista	Jason Matzner		
2006	Return to Rajapur	Samantha Hartley / Samantha Doyle	Nanda Anand		
2007	Normal Adolescent Behavior	Billie	Beth Schacter		
2007	Lars and the Real Girl	Margo	Craig Gillespie		
2008	Red Velvet	Linda	Bruce Dickson		
2009	Taking Woodstock	VW Girl	Ang Lee		
2009	G-Force	Marcie	Hoyt Yeatman		
2010	Going the Distance	Brianna	Nanette Burstein		
2011	The Lie	Brianna	Joshua Leonard		
2013	Horns	Glenna Shepherd	Alexandre Aja		
2015	Americana	Kate	Zachary Shedd		
2015	One More Time	Corinne	Robert Edwards		
2019	Godzilla: King of the Monsters	USS Argo Officer Cross	Michael Dougherty		
2021	What Josiah Saw	Mary Milner	Vincent Grashaw		
2023	V/H/S/85	Dr. Sara Greyson	David Bruckner, Scott Derrickson, Gigi Saul Guerrero, Natasha Kermani, Mike P. Nelson	Segment: "Total Copy"	
2023	Walden	Emily Duperon			
2026	Misty Green	Carol			

=== Television ===
Year	Title	Role	Notes	Ref.
2000	Time Share	Kelly, The Beach Girl	Television film	
2001	Buffy the Vampire Slayer	Kirstie	Episode: "The Body"	
2001–2002	Grounded for Life	Tracey	2 episodes	
2002	Da Möb	Melanie Spores	Voice role; episode: "Lo Fidelity"	
2003	Regular Joe	Nikki	Episode: "Boobysitting"	
2004	Law & Order: Special Victims Unit	Brittany O'Malley	Episode: "Mean"	
2009	American Dad!	Waitress	Voice role; episode: "Stan Time"	
2010	My Generation	Dawn Barbuso	Main role	
2011–2012	Pan Am	Kate Cameron	Main role	
2013	Two Wrongs	Jenny	Television film	
2014–2015	Looking	Megan Murray	2 episodes	
2015	The Secret Life of Marilyn Monroe	Marilyn Monroe	Miniseries	
2019	The Enemy Within	Kate Ryan	Main role	
2022	American Gigolo	Claire	2 episodes	

=== Music videos ===
Year	Title	Role	Artist	Notes
2000	"Temperamental"	Teenage actress	Everything but the Girl	
2001	"Epiphany"	N/A	Staind	
2001	"Provider"	Girlfriend	N.E.R.D.	
2005	"Jesus of Suburbia"	Whatsername	Green Day	
2005	"Whatsername"	Whatsername	Green Day	Unreleased
2019	"I Don't Want to be Your Love"	Unknown	Joseph Shabason	

== Stage credits ==
Year	Title	Role	Notes	Ref.
2005	Dog Sees God: Confessions of a Teenage Blockhead	Tricia	Century Center for the Performing Arts, New York City	
2008	The Seagull	Nina	East 13th Street Theater, New York City	
