= Trailer Park Awards =

American film awards

== Golden Trailer Awards^{1} ==
7th Annual (2006)

Best Action: Mission: Impossible III
Best Horror: The Exorcism of Emily Rose
Summer 2006 Blockbuster: Mission: Impossible III
Best of Show: Mission: Impossible III
Nominations: 10 trailers

6th Annual (2005)

Best Action: War of the Worlds
Best Horror: The Amityville Horror
Summer 2005 Blockbuster: War of the Worlds
Nominations: 9 trailers

5th Annual (2004)

Best Horror/Thriller: Dawn of the Dead
Nominations: 3 trailers

4th Annual (2003)

Best Romance: Secretary *
Trashiest: The Rules of Attraction *
Nominations: 4 trailers

== The Hollywood Reporter Key Art Awards^{2} ==
36th Annual (2007)

First Place: Action/Adventure TV Spots: X-Men: The Last Stand
First Place: Animation A/V (Trailers & TV Spots): Cars
First Place: Horror Trailer: The Hills Have Eyes
First Place: International Poster: Paris je t'aime
Nominations: 12

35th Annual (2006)

nominations and winners not known at this time

34th Annual (2005)

nominations and winners not known at this time

33rd Annual (2004)

Best of Show Audiovisual: The Texas Chainsaw Massacre
Action Adventure Trailers The Texas Chainsaw Massacre **
Action Adventure TV Spots The Texas Chainsaw Massacre **
Comedy TV Spots Bringing Down The House **
Internet Advertising Lost in Translation * **
Home Entertainment Consumer TV Spots The Lion King, Special Edition * **

32nd Annual (2003)

nominations and winners not known at this time

31st Annual (2002)

First Place: Comedy Trailer Not Another Teen Movie *

29th Annual (2000)

Second Place: Comedy Poster Stuart Little *

28th Annual (1999)

Best of Show Audio-Visual: Saving Private Ryan *

First Place: Drama Trailer Saving Private Ryan *

First Place: Teaser Trailer Godzilla *

Second Place: Home Video Trailer The Mask of Zorro *

Third Place: Teaser Trailer Saving Private Ryan *

Third Place: Drama TV Spot Apt Pupil *

27th Annual (1998)

Honorable Mention: Teaser Absolute Power *

26th Annual (1997)

First Place: Drama TV Spot Jerry Maguire *
First Place: Drama Trailer Jerry Maguire *

23rd Annual (1994)

Second Place: Action/Adventure TV Spot In the Line of Fire *
Third Place: Action/Adventure Trailer In the Line of Fire *
Honorable Mention: Action/Adventure Trailer Wolf *

22nd Annual (1993)

First Place: Drama TV Spot Bram Stoker's Dracula *
Second Place: Action/Adventure TV Spot Stephen King's Sleepwalkers *
Third Place: Drama TV Spot Bram Stoker's Dracula *

21st Annual (1992)

Second Place: Drama TV Spot The Prince of Tides *

== PROMAX & BDA Awards^{3} ==
Home Entertainment 2006 Awards

nominations and winners not known at this time

Home Entertainment 2005 Awards

PROMAX - Promotion and Marketing Categories
Gold Award: Movie Campaign Spider-Man 2 *
Gold Award: Television Series Campaign Friends Season 7 *
Gold Award: Print Ad - Consumer The Aviator *
Gold Award: Poster - Promotion Scooby Doo 2 *
Gold Award: Print Campaign - Consumer The Last Samurai (U.S.) *
Gold Award: Print Campaign - Consumer The Last Samurai (Japan) *
Gold Award: Action/Adventure Trailer Spider-Man 2 *
Gold Award: In-Store Display Promotion Scooby Doo 2 Merchandiser *
Gold Award: New Media Mulan Special Edition DVD Website *
Gold Award: Extra Bonus Features Without a Trace Season 1 *
Silver Award: Action/Adventure Movie Spot Spider-Man 2 *
Silver Award: Action/Adventure Movie Television Spot Arthur & Guinevere
Silver Award: Comedy Television Series Spot Friends Season 7 *
Silver Award: Copywriting - Television Trailer Kermit's 50th Anniversary *
Silver Award: Drama Television Series Spot Nip/Tuck Season 1 *
Silver Award: Horror Movie Spot M. Night Shyamalan's The Village
Silver Award: New Media The Three Musketeers DVD Website *

BDA Design Awards Categories
Gold Award: Best Work Never Seen Frankenstein Key Art *
Gold Award: In-Store Display The Last Samurai Merchandiser *
Gold Award: Outdoor Ad Seinfeld Seasons 1-3 *
Gold Award: Print Packaging Seinfeld Seasons 1-3 *
Silver Award: DVD Meny Million Dollar Baby *
Silver Award: In-Store Display Scooby Doo 2 Standee *
Silver Award: Print Packaging The Last Samurai (Japan) *
Silver Award: TV Spot Spy Kids 3-D *
Bronze Award: Print Packaging The Last Samurai (U.S.) *

Home Entertainment 2004 Awards

Gold Award: Drama Trailer Love in the Time of Money *
Gold Award: Copywriting – Television/Trailer The Alice in Wonderland Masterpiece Edition *
Silver Award: Drama Trailer Blue Car *

* as Creative Domain
** award rank not known at this time
