= Buried Alive II =

1997 American television film

- VHS cover
- Genre: Horror; Thriller
- Written by: Walter Klenhard
- Directed by: Tim Matheson
- Starring: Ally Sheedy; Stephen Caffrey; Tracey Needham
- Music by: Michel Colombier
- Country of origin: United States
- Original language: English

Production
- Executive producer: Niki Marvin
- Producer: John V. Stuckmeyer
- Cinematography: Jacques Haitkin
- Editor: Virginia Katz
- Running time: 97 minutes
- Production companies: Niki Marvin Productions; USA Pictures; Universal Television

Original release
- Network: USA Network
- Release: June 18, 1997

Related
- Buried Alive (1990)

Buried Alive II is a 1997 American horror thriller television film directed by Tim Matheson and written by Walter Klenhard. It is a sequel to the 1990 film Buried Alive, and stars Ally Sheedy, Stephen Caffrey and Tracey Needham. Matheson also reprises his character from the previous film, Clint Goodman. It first aired on June 18, 1997, on the USA Network.

== Plot ==
Clint Goodman lives a solitary life under the assumed name Michael Haden, while everyone who knew him believes he died. (Note: This happens ten years after the events of the first movie.) Despite the survival of his attempted murder, he now suffers from serious health issues due to the effects of the toxin and his near-death experience.

When his old friend Sheriff Sam Eberly passes away, Clint decides to come back and attend the funeral. Sam's niece Laura Riskin, who knew Clint a long time before, notices him, but he leaves before she can approach him.

Laura then finds out that she has inherited stock worth $250,000, which her uncle Sam left to her. She wants to start a family with the money, but her husband Randy, who hates his life in the small town, wants to buy a yacht instead and leave there for good. Laura does not sympathize with him, as her uncle had just died and she thinks she needs to support her family that lives there.

Unknown to Laura, Randy is having an affair with a woman named Roxanne. He promises Roxanne to dump Laura as soon as he finds a way to leave with her, but she cannot wait. Randy knows what happened to Clint and decides to do the same thing to Laura. Meanwhile, Laura corners Clint, who tells her to forget him because he is just like a wanted man. After hearing of her marriage troubles, he advises her to leave Randy before she ends up regretting it like he did with Joanna.

Laura decides to forgive Randy, believing he has changed. When they go out for dinner that evening, he slips the toxin into her wine. Laura gets into a cardiac arrest and seemingly dies after consuming the wine, realizing as she collapses that Randy has poisoned her. When the doctor asks Randy if he wants an autopsy, he declines. The case does not raise the police's suspicion because Laura's family has a history of heart failure.

Clint has a heart attack after reading about Laura's death in the newspaper. At the hospital, he asks how Laura died, but the doctor only says that her funeral is being prepared. He wants to go there, but the doctor refuses to let him leave.

At the morgue, as Laura is about to be embalmed, the machine malfunctions. As a result, the staff does not embalm her, despite Randy's insistence on the contrary.

After Laura's funeral, Clint approaches Randy and warns him that Laura may not be dead. Randy questions who Clint is. That night, after having a nightmare about his own past escape from the grave, Clint digs Laura up and believes that she is dead. His exertions on top of his already weakened condition cause another heart attack, and he dies. Laura wakes up and escapes her grave. She puts Clint's body in her coffin and buries it.

She goes home to find Randy and Roxanne in bed together. Devastated, she intends to kill them with a spear gun. However, when she hears that Randy wants to have children with Roxanne, something he refused to do with her, she changes her mind, plotting a different revenge.

Over the next days, Randy notices unusual things in his home, including finding Laura's wedding ring, which had supposedly been buried with her. He has Laura's grave exhumed to make sure she is dead, but the authorities find Clint's body instead. Upon learning that the body is Clint, they then exhume Clint's grave, and find the remains of Joanna and Cortland, along with the money they got from selling Clint's business. Suspecting that Laura is still alive, Randy buys a yacht, and he and Roxanne prepare to leave town. As they are packing their luggage, Laura traps them both inside a tool shed by shutting and blocking the door with Randy's truck. She attaches a hose to the exhaust pipe and feeds it through the vent, knocking the two unconscious with the fumes.

Randy and Roxanne wake up on board the yacht with all doors locked and sealed shut with screws. Roxanne sees Laura peering down through a skylight just before she blocks it off. Randy tries to save himself by blaming Roxanne, causing her to fire a flare gun at him. When the yacht tilts, Randy realizes that Laura intends to sink it and bury them alive at sea. With the water pouring in through the open bilges, he tries to shut off the bilge valve, but she has broken it off. Reaching a storage room, they find funeral clothes and a lifebuoy with "R.I.P. Randy and Roxanne" painted on it. Laura asks Randy why he tried to kill her, then blocks off the last vent and leaves in a motorized dinghy, pausing to watch as the yacht sinks.

The next day, Laura visits Clint's grave, thanking him for his help. She then leaves town with Clint's dog Duke to start a new life. Meanwhile, on the seabed, Randy and Roxanne scream for help inside the sunken yacht.

== Cast ==
- Ally Sheedy as Laura Riskin
- Stephen Caffrey as Randy Riskin
- Tracey Needham as Roxanne
- Tim Matheson as Clint Goodman/Michael Haden
- Brian Libby as Earl, the embalmer
- Shawnette Baity as the Gospel Singer
- Clifton Daniel as Walter
- Ron Dortch as Doctor Diner
- Keith Flippen as the Assistant Embalmer
- Tommy Hinkley as Sheriff Jim Puller
- Lonnie Horsey as Ed
- Elaine Nalee as Edith
- Eric Paisley as Minister
- Mike Pniewski as Dr. Ford
- J. C. Quinn as Curtis
- Ruth Reid as Geena
- Nina Repeta as Sherry
- Gina Stewart as Dr. Unser
- Robert C. Treveiler as Eric
- David Wells as Harold
- Jeff Johnston as E.M.T. (uncredited)

== Production ==
The film was produced by Niki Marvin who also produced the original film.

Buried Alive II has a similar plot to Buried Alive, with the gender of the main characters reversed.

== Reception ==
Allmovie.com gave the film two out of five stars and summed the film up by stating "Entertaining in its own 'they liked it once, they'll love it twice' fashion."

The Video Graveyard gave the film two out of five stars and wrote "Ho-hum sequel basically steps into the same plot mold as the original only with the sexes reversed as Ally Sheedy finds herself the victim of a murder plot by husband Stephen Caffrey and his lover Tracey Needham only for her death to be mistaken after which she returns from her grave and extracts revenge. While familiarity with the original is a plus this is only a mild thriller that panders to its television limitations and suffers from having too much in common with the first one. Not nearly as gripping with Matheson's involvement weak and revenge that's too little, too late. Pretty tedious with Caffery and Needham eventually slipping into bad acting territory during the finale. Brian Libby reprises his comic relief role as the town's embalmer."

Both the Video Movie Guide 2002 (Ballantine Books) and The Video Source Book (Performing Arts) gave the film a rating of 2.5 stars out of five.

== Home media release ==
The film's video premiere was in the summer/autumn of 1997 for America, the UK, Hungary and Portugal. The film made its premiere in Finland on August 11, 2005, via Mainostelevisio (MTV3).

Since its release, the film remained only available in America on out-of-print VHS, distributed by Universal Home Video on March 10, 1998. A VHS was also released in the Netherlands via Universal Pictures Benelux. In 2001, the film was released by Universal in the Philippines on Video CD distributed by Magnavision (CB970702001). In mid-2011, the film was released on DVD in the UK via Boulevard Entertainment.
