= One More Time (2015 film) =

- Theatrical release poster
- Directed by: Robert Edwards
- Written by: Robert Edwards
- Produced by: Lucas Joaquin; Saemi Kim; Saerom Kim; Lars Knudsen; Chris Maybach; Ferne Pearlstein; Jay Van Hoy
- Starring: Christopher Walken; Amber Heard; Kelli Garner; Hamish Linklater; Ann Magnuson; Oliver Platt; Gavin McInnes
- Cinematography: Anne Etheridge
- Edited by: Mollie Goldstein
- Music by: Joe McGinty
- Production companies: Maybach Film Productions; Parts and Labor
- Distributed by: Starz Digital
- Release dates: April 18, 2015 (Tribeca Film Festival); April 8, 2016 (United States)
- Running time: 98 minutes
- Country: United States
- Language: English

One More Time (originally When I Live My Life Over Again) is a 2015 American drama film written and directed by Robert Edwards. The film stars Christopher Walken and Amber Heard, and features performances from Kelli Garner, Hamish Linklater, Ann Magnuson, Gavin McInnes, and Oliver Platt. The film was released on April 8, 2016, by Starz Digital.

== Plot ==
Jude is a 31-year-old, struggling singer-songwriter who leaves New York City to visit her father Paul, an old crooner trying to make a musical comeback, and their dysfunctional family in The Hamptons.

== Cast ==
- Christopher Walken as Paul Francis Lippman / Paul Lombard
- Amber Heard as Jude Lippman / Starshadow Lombard
- Kelli Garner as Corinne Lombard Sanderson
- Hamish Linklater as Tim Sanderson
- Ann Magnuson as Lucille Lombard
- Oliver Platt as Alan Sternberg
- Henry Kelemen as David Sanderson
- Sandra Berrios as Lourdes, The Maid
- Gavin McInnes as Record Producer

== Production ==
Director Robert Edwards previously directed the 2006 film Land of the Blind.

In October 2014, Deadline Hollywood announced that Oliver Simon and Daniel Baur from K5 International would executive produce with Lars Knudsen and Jay Van Hoy from Parts & Labor, Chris Maybach, Saemi and Saerom Kim with Maybach Film Productions, and Ferne Pearlstein and Lucas Joaquin all producing. Filming took place in East Hampton, New York; and New York City.

== Release and reception ==
The film was released on April 8, 2016, by Starz.

One More Time received mixed reviews from critics. Glenn Kenny of RogerEbert.com gave the film 2.5/4 stars. Writing for The New York Times, Neil Genzlinger criticized its reliance on tropes, calling it a "boilerplate family drama". Writing for the Los Angeles Times, Gary W. Goldstein criticized the film's structure, writing that it has a "slender plot", though he also compliments its "many fine small moments". Allen Salkin of the New York Daily News compliments the film's complexity, criticizing its trailer for portraying it as "campy". Nathanael Hood of The Young Folks gave it a 6/10.
