= Tim Matheson =

American actor (born 1947)

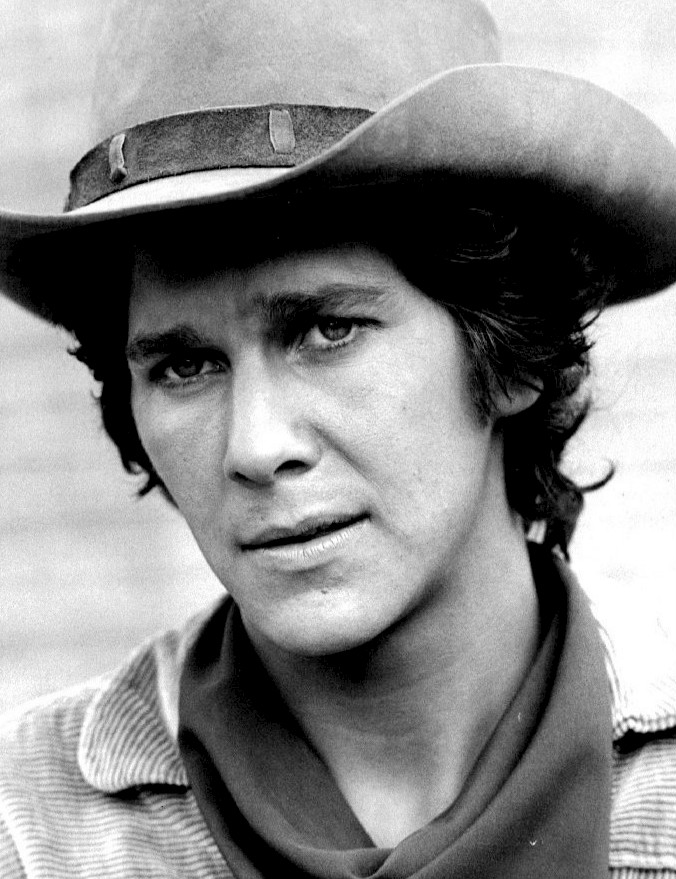
- Matheson in a Bonanza publicity photo, 1972
- Born: Timothy Lewis Matthieson; December 31, 1947 (age 78); Glendale, California, U.S.
- Other name: Tim Matthieson (early credits)
- Occupations: Actor; director
- Years active: 1961–present
- Spouses: Jennifer Leak (m. 1968; div. 1971) Megan Murphy Matheson (m. 1985; div. 2010) Elizabeth Marighetto (m. 2018)
- Children: 3

Timothy Lewis Matheson (born December 31, 1947) is an American actor and director. Some of his best-known acting roles include the title character of the 1960s animated Jonny Quest TV series, Eric "Otter" Stratton in the 1978 comedy film National Lampoon's Animal House, and the recurring role of Vice President John Hoynes in the 2000s NBC drama The West Wing, which earned him two Primetime Emmy Award nominations for Outstanding Guest Actor in a Drama Series.

== Early life ==
Matheson was born in Glendale, California, the son of Clifford Matthieson, a training pilot, and Sally Matthieson. Matheson served a tour of duty in the United States Marine Corps Reserve.

== Career ==
At age 13, Matheson appeared as Roddy Miller in Robert Young's CBS nostalgia comedy series Window on Main Street during the 1961–1962 television season. In the 1962–1963 season he appeared in two episodes of Leave It to Beaver, cast as Mike Harmon, a friend of Beaver’s. In 1962, Matheson also appeared in the CBS situation comedy My Three Sons. In 1964, he provided the voice of the lead character in the animated series Jonny Quest. He also supplied the voices of Sinbad Jr. the Sailor in the 1960s Hanna-Barbera animated series Sinbad Jr. and His Magic Belt and Jace in Space Ghost. He co-starred as Joe Hardy, opposite Richard Gates as Frank Hardy, in a 1967 pilot episode for what would have been a TV series called The Hardy Boys, based on the novel series of the same name, but the series was not picked up.

He played the role of the oldest son, Mike Beardsley, in the film Yours, Mine and Ours (1968), which starred Lucille Ball and Henry Fonda.

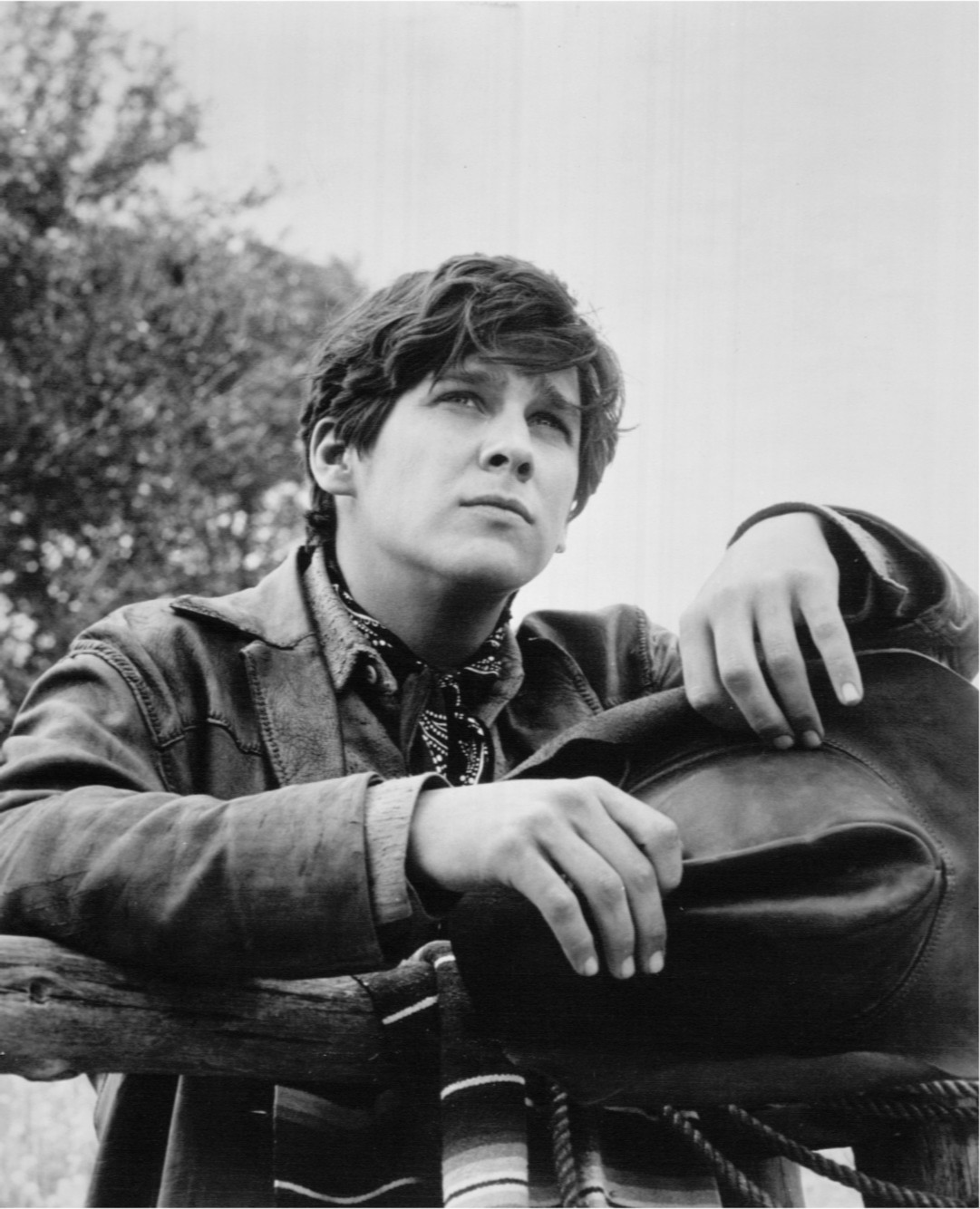
Matheson as Jim Horn in The Virginian

In 1969, Matheson played a modern-day cowboy/horse thief named Leroy Samuel Rutherford in an episode of Adam-12. Also in 1969, he joined the cast of NBC's television Western The Virginian in the eighth season as Jim Horn. He had a guest role in the 14th episode of the second season of Night Gallery, in the story "Logoda's Heads". In the final season of the television Western Bonanza in 1972–1973, Matheson played Griff King, a parolee who tries to reform his life as a worker at the Ponderosa Ranch under Ben Cartwright's tutelage. He portrayed a corrupt motorcycle cop, Phil Sweet, who was part of a death squad with some other young cops in the film Magnum Force (1973). In 1975, he guest starred in CBS's short-lived family drama Three for the Road.

In 1976, Matheson appeared with Kurt Russell in the 15-episode NBC series The Quest. In 1978, he was part of the ensemble cast of National Lampoon's Animal House. The following year, he appeared with John Belushi again in Steven Spielberg's 1941. In 1980 he auditioned for the role of Indiana Jones in Raiders of the Lost Ark, for which Harrison Ford won the part.

Matheson appeared in the film To Be or Not to Be (1983) starring Mel Brooks and Anne Bancroft. He and Catherine Hicks played Rick and Amanda Tucker, who operate a detective agency in Laurel Canyon in CBS' Tucker's Witch, which aired during the 1982–1983 season. Then Matheson starred in the comedy films Up the Creek (1984) and Fletch (1985). In 1989, he starred in the short-lived sitcom Just in Time produced by Warner Bros.

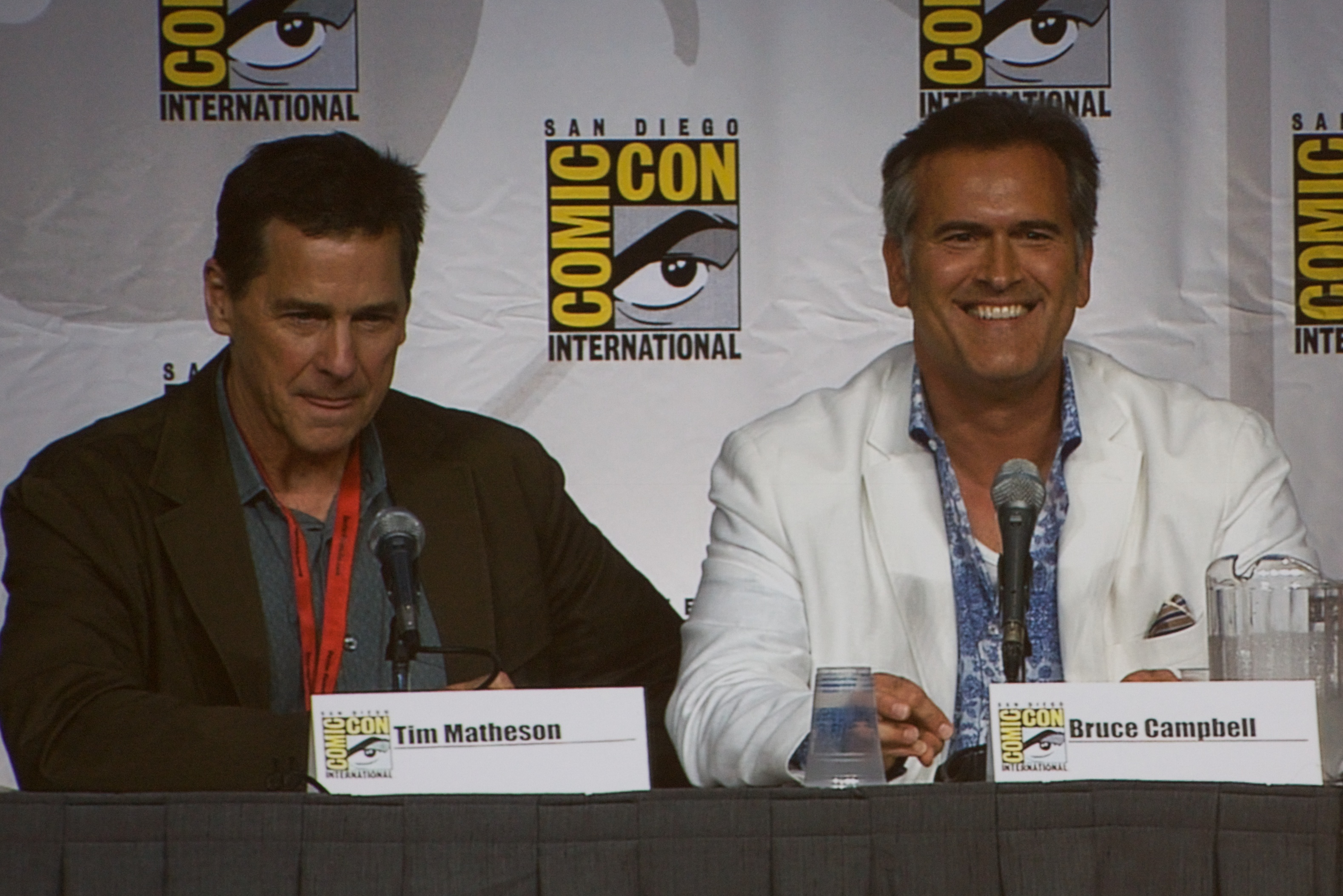
Matheson and Bruce Campbell at San Diego Comic-Con, July 22, 2010

Along with business partner Daniel Grodnik, he bought National Lampoon in 1989, selling it in 1991.

He had a recurring role as Vice President John Hoynes on The West Wing. His work on The West Wing earned him two Primetime Emmy award nominations.

He has directed episodes of Third Watch, Ed, The Twilight Zone, Cold Case, Without a Trace, The West Wing, Psych, The Good Guys, Shark, White Collar, Criminal Minds, Suits and Burn Notice (on which he also performed in a recurring role).

In 1996, Matheson took on the role of a con man who claims to be Carol Brady's thought-to-be-dead husband in A Very Brady Sequel. He appeared in the film Van Wilder (2002), playing the father of the title character, who was inspired by his own character in Animal House; Matheson's character even makes a veiled reference to the fun times he had had at Dartmouth, where the fraternity upon which Animal House is rumored to have "had a strong tradition of existence." He appeared in the auto-racing film Redline. He also appeared in a Volkswagen commercial in 2008.

In 2009, Matheson directed the pilot episode of Covert Affairs, premiered on USA Network in 2010. Matheson also directed the pilot episodes of The Good Guys (2010) for the Fox Network, Criminal Behavior (2011) for Lifetime, and Wild Card (2011) for USA Network. He played Dr. Brick Breeland on Hart of Dixie from 2011 to 2015. Since 2019, Matheson has starred as Doc Mullins in the Netflix series Virgin River.

== Personal life ==
Matheson has been married three times. From 1968 to 1971, he was married to actress Jennifer Leak, whom he met on the set of Yours, Mine, and Ours. In 1985 he married Megan Murphy, with whom he had three children; they divorced in 2010. He married Elizabeth Marighetto in March 2018; they live in Hollywood, California.

== Filmography ==
=== Film ===
Year	Title	Role	Notes
1967	Divorce American Style	Mark Harmon	
1968	Yours, Mine and Ours	Mike Beardsley	
1969	How to Commit Marriage	David Poe	
1973	Magnum Force	Officer Phil Sweet	
1978	National Lampoon's Animal House	Eric "Otter" Stratton	
1978	Almost Summer	Kevin Hawkins	
1979	Dreamer	Harold "Dreamer" Nuttingham	
1979	The Apple Dumpling Gang Rides Again	Private Jeff Reed/Captain Jeff Phillips	
1979	1941	Captain Loomis Birkhead	
1982	A Little Sex	Michael Donovan	
1983	To Be or Not to Be	Lieutenant Andre Sobinski	
1984	The House of God	Roy Basch	
1984	Up the Creek	Bob McGraw	
1984	Impulse	Stuart	
1985	Fletch	Alan Stanwyck	
1989	Speed Zone	Jack O'Neill	
1990	Solar Crisis	Steve Kelso	
1991	Drop Dead Fred	Charles	
1995	Midnight Heat	Tyler Grey	
1996	Black Sheep	Al Donnelly	
1996	A Very Brady Sequel	Roy Martin/Trevor Thomas	
1998	A Very Unlucky Leprechaun	Howard Wilson	
1999	She's All That	Harlan Siler	
1999	The Story of Us	Marty	
2000	Chump Change	Simon "Sez" Simone	
2002	Van Wilder	Vance Wilder Sr.	
2003	Where Are They Now?: A Delta Alumni Update	Dr. Eric "Otter" Stratton, OB/GYN	Short
2005	Don't Come Knocking	Producer 1	
2005	Magnificent Desolation: Walking on the Moon 3D	Houston Capcom	Voice
2007	Redline	Jerry Brecken	
2009	Behind Enemy Lines: Colombia	Carl Dobbs	Video
2009	American Pie Presents: The Book of Love	Alumnus Guy No. 4	Video
2011	No Strings Attached	Eli's Dad #2	
2015	Tom and Jerry: Spy Quest	The President	Voice
2017	Jumanji: Welcome to the Jungle	Old Man Vreeke	Uncredited
2018	6 Balloons	Gary	
2019	Child's Play	Henry Kaslan	

=== Television ===
Year	Title	Role	Notes
1961–1962	Window on Main Street	Roddy Miller	First acting role
1961–1962	The Alvin Show	Additional voices	1 episode
1962–1963	Leave It to Beaver	Michael "Mike" Harmon	2 episodes
1962–1963	My Three Sons	Alan Edgerton	3 episodes
1963	Ripcord	David	Episode: "The Final Jump"
1964–1965	Jonny Quest	Jonny Quest	Voice
1965	O.K. Crackerby!	Huntington Hawthorne	Episode: "Woodman, Spare That Family Tree"
1965–1966	Sinbad Jr. and His Magic Belt	Sinbad Jr.	Voice
1966	Space Ghost	Jace	Voice
1966	Thompson's Ghost	Eddie Thompson	Television film
1967	The Mystery of the Chinese Junk	Joe Hardy	Television pilot
1967	Samson & Goliath	Samson	Voice
1967	NBC Children's Theatre	Randy	Episode: "Like the Red Sea, We Will Never Part"
1969	Adam-12	Leroy	Episode: "Log 62: Grand Theft Horse?"
1969–1970	The Virginian	Jim Horn	
1970	San Francisco International Airport	SFX	Episode: "We Once Came Home to Parades"
1970	Bracken's World	Teek Howell	Episode: "The Country Boy"
1971	Matt Lincoln	Stan Lowell	Episode: "Karen"
1971	Room 222	Jerry Cates	Episode: "The Long Honeymoon"
1971	Hitched	Clarence Bridgeman	Television film
1971	Lock, Stock and Barrel	Clarence Bridgeman	Television film
1971	The D.A.	Howard Goodman	Episode: "The People vs. Slovik"
1971	The Bold Ones: The Lawyers	Miles Parker	Episode: "By Reason of Insanity"
1971	Night Gallery	Henley	Episode: "Logoda's Heads"
1971–1974	Owen Marshall, Counselor at Law	Various	4 episodes
1972	Here's Lucy	Peter Sullivan	Episode: "Kim Moves Out"
1972	Ironside	Darryl Podell	Episode: "His Fiddlers Three"
1972	The Smith Family	Mark	Episode: "Father-in-Law"
1972–1973	Bonanza	Griff King	14 episodes
1972–1978	Insight	Various	6 episodes
1973	The Wide World of Mystery	Tommy	Episode: "Night Life"
1973	Medical Center	Sam Miller	Episode: "Impasse"
1973	Kung Fu	Lieutenant Bill Wyland	Episode: "The Soldier"
1974	The Magician	Jerry Purcell	Episode: "The Illusion of the Fatal Arrow"
1974	Police Story	Allen Rich	Episode: "Fingerprint"
1974	Remember When	Warren Thompson	Television film
1975	The Last Day	Emmet Dalton	Television film
1975	The Runaway Barge	Danny Worth	Television film
1975	Three for the Road	Tom Aberling	Episode: "Match Point"
1976	Rhoda	Michael Stearns	Episode: "A Federal Case"
1976	Jigsaw John	Nick Pappas	Episode: "Thicker Than Blood"
1976	Petrocelli	Mike Fisher	Episode: "Shadow of a Doubt"
1976	The Hemingway Play	Wemidge – Young Hemingway	Television film
1976	The Quest	Quentin Beaudine	Television film
1976	Visions	Leonard	Episode: "The War Widow
1977	Hawaii Five-O	Brent Saunders	Episode: "Deadly Doubles"
1977	Mary White	William L. White	Television film
1977	What Really Happened to the Class of '65?	Jay Miller	Episode: "Everybody's Girl"
1978	Baa Baa Black Sheep	Major Bud Warren	Episode: "Wolves in the Sheep Pen"
1978	How the West Was Won	Curt Grayson	3 episodes
1982	Bus Stop	Beauregard "Beau" Decker	Television film
1982–1983	Tucker's Witch	Rick Tucker	
1983	Listen to Your Heart	Josh Stern	
1984	The Best Legs in the Eighth Grade	Mark Fisher	Television film
1985	Obsessed with a Married Woman	Tony Hammond	Television film
1985	George Burns Comedy Week	"The Girl With Something Extra"	Episode: "The Dynamite Girl"
1986	Blind Justice	Jim Anderson	Television film
1987	Warm Hearts, Cold Feet	Mike Byrd	Television film
1987	Bay Cove	Jerry Lebon	Television film
1987	Trying Times	Mitch	Episode: "Get a Job"
1988	Just in Time	Harry Stadlin	
1989	Nikki and Alexander	Alexander	Television film
1989	The Littlest Victims	Doctor James Oleske	Television film
1989	Little White Lies	Dr. Harry McCrae	Television film
1990	Buried Alive	Clint Goodman	Television film
1990	Joshua's Heart	Tom	Television film
1991	Sometimes They Come Back	Jim Norman	Television film
1991	The Woman Who Sinned	Michael Robeson	Television film
1991	Charlie Hoover	Charlie Hoover	
1992	Quicksand: No Escape	Scott Reinhardt	Television film
1993	Relentless: Mind of a Killer	Dr. Peter Hellman	Television film
1993	Dying to Love You	Roger Paulson	Television film
1993	Batman: The Animated Series	Deputy Commissioner Gil Mason	Voice, episode: "Shadow of the Bat"
1993	Fallen Angels	Howard Hughes	Episode: "Since I Don't Have You"
1993	Shameful Secrets	Daniel	Television film
1993	A Kiss to Die For	William Tauber	Television film
1993	Trial & Error	Peter Hudson	Television film
1993	Harmful Intent	Dr. Rhodes	Television film
1994	Target of Suspicion	Nick	Television film
1994	While Justice Sleeps	Winfield 'Win' Cooke	Television film
1995	Cybill	Teddy	Episode: "Virgin, Mother, Crone"
1995	Fast Company	Detective Jack Matthews	Television film
1995	Tails You Live, Heads You're Dead	Detective McKinley	Television film
1995	Jonny Quest vs. The Cyber Insects	4-Dac	Voice, television film
1996	An Unfinished Affair	Alex Connor	Television film
1996	Twilight Man	Jordan P. Cooper	Television film
1996	Buried Secrets	Clay Roff	Television film
1996	Christmas in My Hometown	Jacob (Jake) Peterson	Television film; also known as A Holiday for Love
1997	The Legend of Calamity Jane	Captain John O'Rourke	Voice
1997	Sleeping with the Devil	Dick Strang	Television film
1997	Buried Alive II	Clint Goodman	Television film
1998	Dead Man's Gun	Reverent Jeremiah Early	Episode: "Wages of Sin"
1998	Rescuers: Stories of Courage: Two Families	Adolf Althoff	Television film
1998	Forever Love	Alex Brooks	Television film
1998	The New Batman Adventures	Michael Vreeland	Voice, episode: "Chemistry"
1998	Catch Me If You Can	Norm	Television film
1999	At the Mercy of a Stranger	John Davis	Television film
1999–2006	The West Wing	Vice President John Hoynes	20 episodes Nominated — Primetime Emmy Award for Outstanding Guest Actor in a Drama Series (2002–2003)
2000	Navigating the Heart	John Daly	Television film
2000	Hell Swarm	Kirk Bluhdorn	Television film
2000	Sharing the Secret	John Moss	Television film
2000	Jackie Bouvier Kennedy Onassis	John F. Kennedy	Television film
2001	Second Honeymoon	George	Television film
2001–2002	Wolf Lake	Sheriff Matthew Donner	
2002	Mom's on Strike	Alan Harris	Television film
2002	The King of Queens	Dr. Farber	Episode: "Two-Thirty"
2002	Breaking News	Bill Dunne	
2003	Martha, Inc.: The Story of Martha Stewart	Andy Stewart	Television film
2003	The King and Queen of Moonlight Bay	Al Dodge	Television film
2003	Ed	Peter Evashavik	Episode: "Blips"
2003	Without a Trace	Dr. Aaron Morrison	Episode: "The Friendly Skies"
2004	Judas	Pontius Pilate	Television film
2004	Justice League Unlimited	Maxwell Lord	Voice, episode: "Ultimatum"
2006	Augusta, Gone	Ben Dudman	Television film
2007	The World According to Barnes		Television film
2007	Shark	Judge Andrew Bennett	Episode: "Here Comes the Judge"
2007–2013	Burn Notice	Larry Sizemore	Recurring role
2008	Entourage	Steve Parles	Episode: "Fire Sale"
2008	To Love and Die	James White	Television film
2009	Batman: The Brave and the Bold	Jarvis Kord	Voice, episode: "Fall of the Blue Beetle!"
2009	Body Politic	Senator Webster	Television film
2010	White Collar	Edward Walker	Episode: "Withdrawal"
2011–2015	Hart of Dixie	Dr. Bertram "Brick" Breeland	Recurring role episodes 1–14; regular role episodes 15-76
2012–2013	Scooby-Doo! Mystery Incorporated	Brad Chiles	Voice, 13 episodes
2013	CSI: Crime Scene Investigation	Oliver Tate	2 episodes
2015	The Prince	Soloman	Television film
2015	Last Chance of Christmas	Reginald Buckley	Television film
2016	Motive	Brent Rodman	Episode: "Chronology of Pain"
2016	Killing Reagan	Ronald Reagan	Television film Nominated — Critics' Choice Television Award for Best Actor in a Movie/Miniseries (2016)
2017	Snowfall	George Miller	Unaired pilot
2017	Magical Christmas Ornaments	J. P. Presley	Television film
2017, 2019	Madam Secretary	Fred Moran	2 episodes
2017–2018	Me, Myself & I	Richard	2 episodes
2018	The Good Fight	Tully Nelson	4 episodes
2018	The Affair	James	2 episodes
2019	Ryan Hansen Solves Crimes on Television	Steve	3 episodes
2019	The Goldbergs	Eric	Episode: "Animal House"
2019–present	Virgin River	Doc Mullins	Main role; also director
2019–2021	This Is Us	Dave Malone	3 episodes
2019–2020	Fast & Furious Spy Racers	General Dudley	Voice; 4 episodes
2021	Evil	Edward Tragoren	2 episodes
2023	Quantum Leap	Neal Russell	Episode: "The Lonely Hearts Club"
2025 -	9-1-1: Nashville	Edward Raleigh	Recurring

=== Theme parks ===
Year	Title	Role	Notes
1989	Body Wars	Captain Braddock	Disney attraction

=== As director ===
Year	Title	Notes
1984	St. Elsewhere	
1994	Breach of Conduct	Television film
1995	Tails You Live, Heads You're Dead	Television film
1997	Buried Alive II	Television film
1999	In the Company of Spies	Television film
2000	Hell Swarm	Television film
2003	The Twilight Zone	
2003	Threat Matrix	
2003	Ed	
2003–2004	Third Watch	
2003–2004	Without a Trace	
2004–2005	Cold Case	
2005	Numbers	
2005	Las Vegas	
2005	Threshold	
2005	E-Ring	
2006	Killer Instinct	
2006	Augusta, Gone	Television film
2006	The West Wing	
2006	Just Legal	
2006–2009	Criminal Minds	
2007	Traveler	
2007	Eureka	
2007	Bionic Woman	
2007–2009	Psych	
2007–2010	Burn Notice	
2008	True Confessions of a Hollywood Starlet	Television film
2009	Behind Enemy Lines: Colombia	Video
2009	Dirty Sexy Money	
2009	Greek	
2010	The Good Guys	
2010	White Collar	
2010	Covert Affairs	
2010	Persons Unknown	
2011	Criminal Minds: Suspect Behavior	
2011	Suits	
2011	Criminal Behavior	Television film
2011–2012	Drop Dead Diva	
2012–2015	Hart of Dixie	
2014	Wild Card	Pilot
2015	The Last Ship	
2016	Lucifer	
2016	Person of Interest	
2017	Taken	
2019–2020	Virgin River	
