= Buried Alive (1990 TV film) =

1990 American television film

- American/UK VHS cover of Buried Alive
- Genre: Thriller, horror
- Screenplay by: Mark Patrick Carducci
- Story by: David A. Davies
- Directed by: Frank Darabont
- Starring: Tim Matheson; Jennifer Jason Leigh; William Atherton; Hoyt Axton
- Theme music composer: Michel Colombier
- Country of origin: United States
- Original language: English

Production
- Producer: Niki Marvin
- Production locations: Botswana; Los Angeles
- Cinematography: Jacques Haitkin
- Editor: Richard G. Haines
- Running time: 93 minutes
- Production companies: Niki Marvin Productions; Universal Television
- Budget: $2,000,000

Original release
- Network: USA Network
- Release: May 9, 1990

Related
- Buried Alive II (1997)

Buried Alive is a 1990 American made-for-television horror thriller film directed by Frank Darabont and starring Tim Matheson, Jennifer Jason Leigh, William Atherton and Hoyt Axton.

The film received mixed reviews from critics, while the scenario, dark humor, and ending received some praise.

== Plot ==
Clint Goodman is a successful contractor who lives with his wife Joanna. Joanna has been having an affair with local doctor Cortland van Owen. They conspire to kill Clint and sell his company and house, so that Joanna can buy a clinic in Beverly Hills. Cortland gives Joanna poison, taken from a tropical fish. While having dinner with Clint, Joanna begins to have a change of heart but still spikes his wine with some of the poison. After drinking the poisoned wine, Clint has a heart attack and seems to die, but while his body is at the morgue, he shows signs of life. However, Joanna instructs that Clint be given a quick funeral, skipping the embalming process and choosing a cheap, water-damaged casket for him.

Clint, surviving the diluted poisoning, wakes up, buried alive. After breaking through the coffin and escaping his grave, he returns to his house and learns the truth about his wife and Cortland. He hides in the basement to recuperate and overhears that Joanna was pregnant, and that she and Cortland had his child aborted secretly.

The next morning, Clint's friend Sheriff Sam Eberly discovers that Clint's grave has been disturbed and the body is missing.

Joanna finds the home's bathroom floor covered with mud. She frantically calls Cortland but gets his answering machine. She is startled by Clint's dog, Duke. Just as she is about to shoot the dog, Clint, disguised in a welding mask, appears from behind the open basement door. Surprised, Joanna falls in the basement, knocking herself unconscious, and Clint locks her inside.

Meanwhile, Cortland loads a syringe with more fish poison. Arriving at Clint's house, he finds the money in a suitcase on the bed, and takes it. Searching for Joanna, he enters the basement. Believing Cortland to be the masked figure, Joanna knocks him unconscious, causing him to drop the syringe. She then takes the money and tries to escape, but Clint locks them both inside. As Cortland regains consciousness, Joanna realizes her mistake. In the house, Clint knocks out walls and moves furniture ominously.

Joanna then finds the fish poison syringe and realizes that Cortland was going to kill her. Cortland reveals that there never was a clinic and that he was actually trying to rob both her and Clint in order to pay for a trip to the tropics. They fight, and just as Cortland is about to use the syringe on Joanna, the basement door opens. Exiting the basement, the pair finds that most of the house is now blocked off by wooden panels. While trying to find a way out, they are led through a maze and separated. At the end of a passage leading to an unblocked window, Cortland sees a shadowy figure and, thinking it is Sam, tries to bribe him. Clint reveals himself; a stunned Cortland tries to flee, but trips on the money briefcase and falls on the syringe, fatally injecting himself with the poison.

Shortly afterwards, Joanna is trapped between Clint and a small hatch. She crawls through the hatchway along a low passage but reaches a dead-end, allowing Clint to shut her inside. Clint reveals himself to her and mentions their aborted child, asking if it was a boy or a girl. He dumps the dead Cortland and money inside what is now a large wooden coffin and nails it shut. He then loads it onto his truck and sets fire to the house.

Sam arrives at the house. After the fire is extinguished, no bodies are found inside. Returning to the cemetery, Sam sees a man standing at Clint's filled-in grave. Realizing it is Clint, Sam tells him to never come back, obliquely promising to keep his secret. Clint and Duke drive away, and the final shot reveals that the still-alive Joanna, the dead Cortland, and the money all now occupy Clint's grave, with Joanna hopelessly screaming for help.

== Cast ==
- Tim Matheson as Clint Goodman
- Jennifer Jason Leigh as Joanna Goodman
- William Atherton as Dr. Cortland 'Cort' Van Owen
- Hoyt Axton as Sheriff Sam Eberly
- Jay Gerber as Quintan
- Wayne Grace as Bill Scorby
- Donald Hotton as Reynolds
- Brian Libby as Earl, The Embalmer
- Peg Shirley as Helen Eberley
- David Youse as Billy
- Milt Hamerman as The Coroner

== Production ==
The film's budget was $2,000,000 and had the working title of Till Death Do Us Part.

John Carpenter stated in the audio commentary for his film Vampires that Darabont (his close friend, who also had a cameo in that film) asked Carpenter to play a truck driver in Buried Alive. Carpenter stated that he turned the offer down because he only wanted to play a character that is killing someone, or about to, or if he's in bed with a beautiful woman.

== Release ==
The film first premiered on May 9, 1990, on the USA Network. The film was released with two taglines: "She planned on her husband's death. But not on his coming back for revenge." and "One of them put an end to the marriage, until the other came back for revenge."

Following the film's release, it remained only available on out-of-print VHS in America on March 21, 1991. It was released on DVD in the UK in October 2011. Other previous DVD releases included a Dutch import and the Australian double feature DVD which included the 2001 film They Crawl. Kino Lorber released the film on Blu-ray and DVD in America on January 12, 2021, in a new 2k master featuring an audio commentary by author and journalist Bryan Reeseman and an interview with William Atherton.

== Sequel ==
A sequel followed in 1997, titled Buried Alive II, which starred Ally Sheedy and Stephen Caffrey. The film also was directed by and co-starred Tim Matheson, who along with Brian Libby were the only cast members from the original to return. The film followed a similar plot to Buried Alive, switching the genders of the leading characters.

== Reception ==
Cavett Binion of AllMovie gave the film two and a half stars out of five, writing, "Produced for cable TV, this pedestrian thriller purports to be a riff on Edgar Allan Poe's 'The Premature Burial' but actually bears more of a resemblance to Diabolique." Tom Leins for Devon & Cornwall Film wrote a favorable review, stating, "Buried Alive is a quirky little curio elevated above TV-movie nonsense by committed performances from the three charismatic leads. The horror genre has loomed large in Darabont's work since he scripted A Nightmare on Elm Street 3: Dream Warriors back in 1987, and although his work in the horror sphere arguably reached its peak with zombie series The Walking Dead – prior to his untimely sacking – Buried Alive represents an appealing footnote in an often-inspired career." Gary Collinson of Flickering Myth gave the film a favorable review, writing, "Although the plot of Buried Alive is fairly predictable, the film benefits immensely from some inventive direction from Darabont, while a capable cast of familiar faces including Matheson, Leigh, Atherton and country singer Hoyt Axton also helps to elevate it above your typical TV movie standards."

In the book Time Capsule: Reviews of Horror, Science Fiction and Fantasy Films and TV Shows from 1987–1991, J. P. Harris wrote a mixed review of the film, stating, "Buried Alive is more of a murder story than a horror movie. Whilst the plot actually makes sense and is professionally presented with a nicely ironic ending, there is little suspense and the whole thing is somewhat of a disappointment, given Frank Darabont's previous excellent genre record."

The book DVD & Video Guide 2005 (Ballantine Books) gave the film four out of five stars, whilst TV Guide (Triangle Publications) gave it two stars out of five.
