= Mike Pniewski =

American actor and public speaker (born 1961)

- Born: Michael Pniewski; April 20, 1961 (age 65); Los Angeles, California, U.S.
- Occupations: Actor; public speaker
- Years active: 1984–present

Michael Pniewski (born April 20, 1961) is an American actor and public speaker.

== Life and career ==
Pniewski was born in Los Angeles, California. His education began at UCLA, where he graduated in 1983 with a Bachelor of Arts Degree in Theater and also won the Natalie Wood Acting Award.

His most notable role has been that of Chief of Detectives Kenny Moran on the hit television series Law & Order: Criminal Intent. He was seen on the Emmy Award-winning HBO series Recount. Pniewski appeared as legendary football coach Bobby Bowden in the film We Are Marshall and co-starred in the CBS/Hallmark Hall of Fame production Front of the Class. In 2019, he appeared in the Clint Eastwood film Richard Jewell. Additional credits include Big Love, Thief, The Riches, Miami Vice, The Ultimate Gift, The Sopranos, Madam Secretary, Blue Bloods, CSI: NY, Conviction, Warm Springs, Buried Alive II, Spaceballs, One Tree Hill, CSI: Miami, ER, Runaway Jury, From the Earth to the Moon, Ray, Remember the Titans, NCIS: New Orleans and Two Soldiers, the 2003 Academy Award winner for Best Live Action Short Film.

He has appeared in many commercials and done voice over work for Xerox, Ford, Buffalo’s, Wal-Mart, TNT, Bell South, Sprite, CNN, McDonald's, UPS, Hills Brothers, Georgia Power, Publix, Wachovia, Sudafed, Zoo Atlanta, Chevrolet, the Atlanta Thrashers, Miller Lite, SunTrust Bank, GTE, and Blockbuster Video.

From January 2002 until September 2004, he served as Georgia’s representative on the National Board of the Screen Actors Guild (SAG). He is currently the Atlanta Local First Vice-President of SAG-AFTRA.

In 2026, Pniewski portrayed Larry Van Oosten in the Lifetime film Rescued by Faith: The Connie and Larry Van Oosten Story which detailed their kidnapping and ransom at the hands of Chad Schipper.

== Selected filmography ==
- Beverly Hills Cop (1984) - Bonded Warehouse Clerk #1
- Highway to Heaven (Season 1 Episode 20) (1985) - Cop #1
- Modern Girls (1986) - Fire Marshal
- St. Elsewhere (season 5 episode 10) (1986) - Delivery Man
- Burglar (1987) - Man in Grey Uniform #1
- Spaceballs (1987) - Laser gunner Phillip Asshole
- Remote Control (1988) - Artie
- L.A. Law (season 2 episode 10 (1988), season 3 episode 4 (1988), season 8 episode 3 (1993), season 8 episode 10 (1994)) - Judge James M. McCall
- Matlock (episode: The Priest) (1989) - Father David Burke
- Downtown (1990) - Man with Gun
- House Party (1990) - Cop #2
- The Willies (1990) - Mr. Belcher
- Life Stinks (1991) - Male Nurse
- A Time to Kill (1996) - Deputy Tatum
- The People vs. Larry Flynt (1996) - Trucker
- Our Son, the Matchmaker (1996) - Kevin Harris
- The Gingerbread Man (1998) - Chatham County Sheriff
- From the Earth to the Moon (episode 4) (1998) - Flight Surgeon
- Forces of Nature (1999) - Conductor
- Takedown (2000) - Businessman
- Remember the Titans (2000) - Cop
- Unshackled (2000) - Guard Dobbs
- Walker Texas Ranger (2000) - Chief Moss Tucker
- Out of Time (2003) - Agent White
- Runaway Jury (2003) - Strode
- The Clearing (2004) - Detective Kyle Woodward
- Bobby Jones: Stroke of Genius (2004) - Mr. Mullen
- Ray (2004) - Bus Driver
- Diary of a Mad Black Woman (2005) - Foreman
- Law and Order "License to Kill" (2005, TV Series) - Randall Stoller
- Miami Vice (2006) - ER Doctor
- Heavens Fall (2006) - Deputy (uncredited)
- The Ultimate Gift (2006) - Operative
- We Are Marshall (2006) - Bobby Bowden
- Blood Done Sign My Name (2010) - William Burgwyn
- Lottery Ticket (2010) - Carl
- The Ledge (2011) - Lt. Markowitz
- Seeking Justice (2011) - Gibbs
- Dolphin Tale (2011) - Prosthetic Consultant
- Mean Girls 2 (2011) - Mr. Giamatti
- Safe Haven (2013) - Lieutenant Robinson
- Devil's Knot (2013) - Landlord (uncredited)
- Halt and Catch Fire (2014 - 2015, TV Series) - Barry Shields
- Madam Secretary (2014 - 2019, TV Series) - Gordon Becker
- Million Dollar Arm (2014) - Walter (Pittsburgh Scout)
- The Good Lie (2014) - Nick
- The Founder (2016) - Harvey Peltz
- Vengeance: A Love Story (2017) - Judge Schpiro
- The Case for Christ (2017) - Kenny London
- American Made (2017) - Willie (State Police)
- The Good Fight (2018 - 2022, TV Series) - Frank Landau
- Quantico (2018, TV Series) - Dick Booth
- Lodge 49 (2018, TV Series) - Ken Boyer
- The Resident (2018 - 2019, TV Series) - Abe Benedict
- Richard Jewell (2019) - Brandon Hamm
- Bluff City Law (2019, TV Series) - US Attorney Blumberg
- Hightown (2020 - 2024, TV Series) - Ed Murphy
- Ozark (2022, TV Series) - Ricky DiCicco
- Law & Order: Organized Crime (2022, TV Series) - Captain Patrick Darnell
- National Treasure: Edge of History (2022, TV Series) - Mark
- FBI: Most Wanted (2023, TV Series) - Captain James Kennedy
- Class of '09 (2023, Miniseries) - Chief Albury
- Reptile (2023) - Chief Marty Graeber
- His & Hers (2026, Miniseries) - Jim Pruss
- Rescued by Faith: The Connie and Larry Van Oosten Story (2026) - Larry Van Oosten
- Chicago Med (2026, TV Series) - Mark Asher
- Cape Fear (2026, TV Series) - Coburn
