= Ajmal Zaheer Ahmad =

American film director

- Born: Ajmal Zaheer Ahmad; Detroit, Michigan, U.S.
- Education: Detroit Country Day School; Art Center College of Design
- Occupation: Film maker
- Years active: 2000-present

Ajmal Zaheer Ahmad is an American film director, writer and producer from Detroit, Michigan. He is also co-founder and current CEO of Detroit-based film production company Exxodus Pictures. His work as a film maker includes Perfect Mismatch, Jinn and My Soul To Keep.

== Early life and career ==
Ajmal was born to Pakistani parents in West Bloomfield, Michigan. He attended Detroit Country Day School in Southfield, Michigan and Art Center College of Design in Pasadena, California.

Ajmal began his career as a concept designer in California for film, television and commercials. He made his debut in 2000 by creating a commercial for Apple Computer called Apple Core. Ajmal then produced a short film Alliance in 2005 and a Bollywood film It's a Mismatch (now Perfect Mismatch) in 2009. He gained public recognition by his action-horror-thriller film Jinn, released in April 2014. Ajmal has also appeared Television series Icon News in 2010 and film The Citizen in 2012.

=== Jinn ===
The film Jinn was written and produced by Ajmal Zaheer Ahmad. He told in an interview that he was thinking of making 'Jinn' for more than 10 years. He also told that he was listening stories of Jinn since childhood and his mother used to say "If you don't eat your veggies, the Jinn is going to come out of the woods and get you.".

== Filmography ==
Year	Film	Role
2005	Alliance (short film)	Director & Writer, Producer
2009	Perfect Mismatch	Director & Writer
2012	The Citizen	Rajiv
2014	Jinn	Director & Writer, Producer
2014	Still Here (short film)	Executive Producer
2019	My Soul To Keep	Director & Writer, Producer

Television

Year	Television	Notes
2010	Icon News	Cameo Appearance
