= Ray Park =

British actor and martial artist (born 1974)

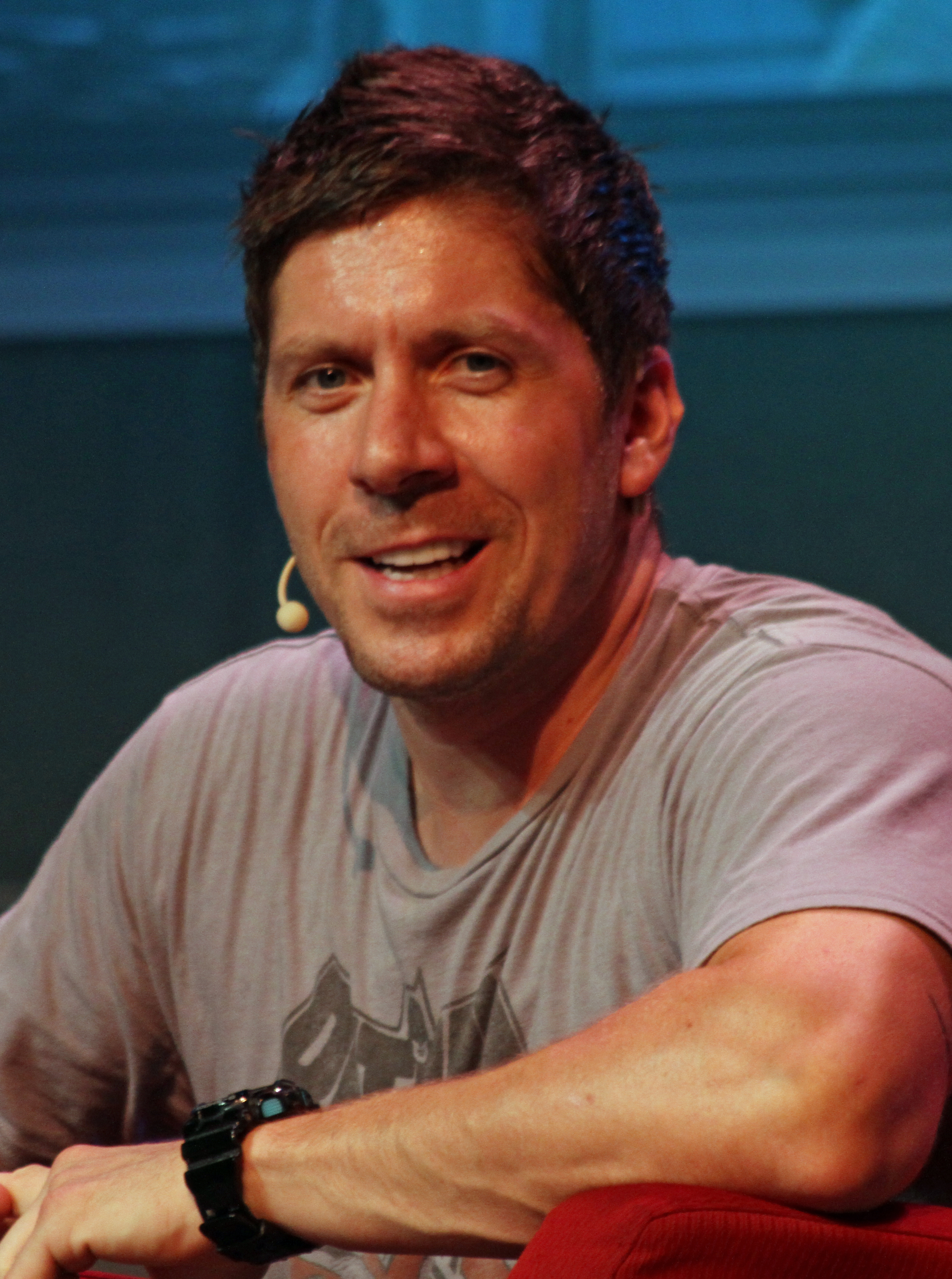
- Park speaking at Star Wars Weekends 2011 at Walt Disney World
- Born: Raymond Park; 23 August 1974 (age 51); Glasgow, Scotland
- Occupations: Actor; martial artist; stuntman
- Years active: 1997–present
- Spouse: Lisa Park
- Children: 2
- Website: raypark.com

Raymond Park (born 23 August 1974) is a British actor, martial artist and stuntman. He is best known for physically portraying Darth Maul in Star Wars: Episode I – The Phantom Menace and Solo: A Star Wars Story, along with a motion capture performance in the final season of Star Wars: The Clone Wars, Toad in X-Men, Snake Eyes in G.I. Joe: The Rise of Cobra and G.I. Joe: Retaliation, and Edgar in Heroes.

== Early life ==
Park was born on 23 August 1974 in Glasgow, Scotland. At the age of seven, he moved with his family to London, England.

Park was introduced to martial arts by his father, who was a fan of Bruce Lee, and began training martial arts at the age of 7, starting with one year of Hapkido, then traditional Shaolin Kung Fu such as Nam Pai Chuan at UK Chin Woo Northern Shaolin, as well as modern wushu. When he was 15, Park went to Malaysia to improve his skills. From 1991 to 1996, he was a member of the British national wushu team. Park went on to compete in martial arts tournaments around the world including the World Wushu Championships before turning his attention to acting in the late 1990s.

== Career ==
Park began working in films as a stunt double for the film Mortal Kombat Annihilation, doing the stunts for both Robin Shou and James Remar. Park also did some cameos as monsters, including Baraka. All of these were non-speaking roles.

In 1999, Park appeared in Star Wars: Episode I – The Phantom Menace, as the Sith Lord Darth Maul. While the character only had three lines, Park's voice was dubbed over with that of actor Peter Serafinowicz. From his work on Star Wars, Park was cast in a cameo role in Fanboys as a Skywalker Ranch security guard who says, "Time for you to get mauled, boy," as he pulls out two nightsticks.

In addition to this acting work, he has also been Christopher Walken's fight stunt double for the film Sleepy Hollow. Park appeared in the scene where Walken's character, the Headless Horseman, murders the Killian family and Brom Van Brunt, among others.

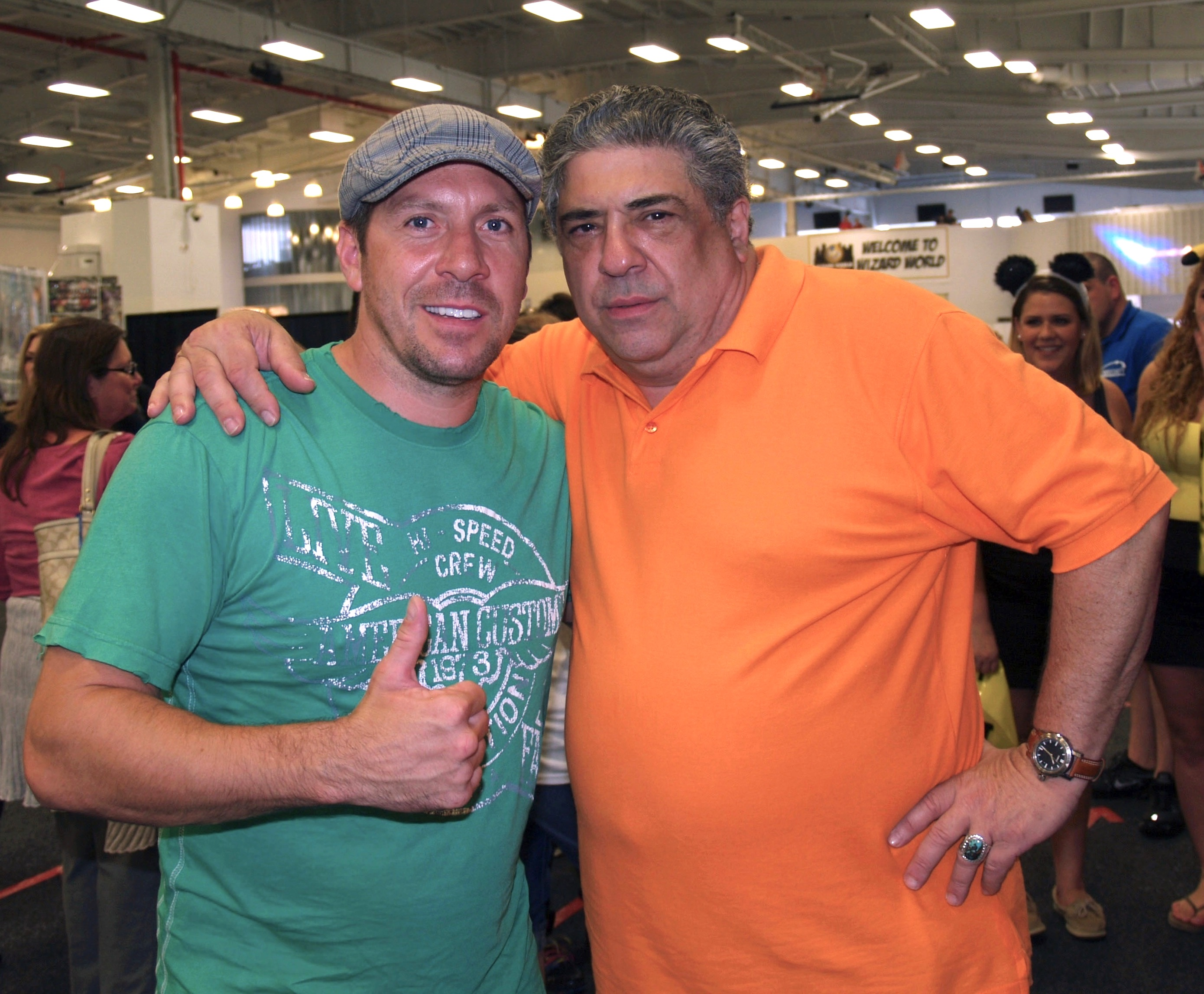
Park with Vincent Pastore at the 2013 Wizard World New York Experience

Park had his first real speaking part in X-Men as Toad.

In December 2007, Park was confirmed for the role of Snake Eyes in G.I. Joe: The Rise of Cobra and G.I. Joe: Retaliation involving a variation of the international G.I. Joe force who fought the minions of Cobra in the comics.

He worked with comic book creator-turned-filmmaker Kevin VanHook in the film Slayer, starring in the dual roles of acrobatic twin vampires. This film also saw him appearing again with Sleepy Hollow co-star Casper Van Dien.

ComiCon 2007 saw the premiere of the teaser trailer for The Descendants, another comic book adaptation based on an independent comic by writer Joey Andrade.

Park appeared as Edgar in the fourth season of the television series Heroes.

Park was also included in the motion capture team of the 2008 James Bond video game adaptation of Quantum of Solace.

In the comic book-styled film Hellbinders, he plays a soulless mercenary who, along with an elite assassin (Johnny Yong Bosch) and the last remaining member of the long dead Knights Templar, Esteban Cueto, must overcome their innate mistrust of each other and join forces to defeat Legion before it opens the gates of hell itself and overruns the entire world. Park narrated on 26 February 2010 the introduction of The FireBreather, a car from Classic Design Concepts in Detroit Autorama 2010, which appears in Park's supernatural thriller Jinn.

In 2011, Park guest starred in the TV series Nikita as the London Guardian, Brendan. He reprised his role as Maul in Solo: A Star Wars Story (2018), with Sam Witwer providing the voice.

In 2019 during Star Wars Celebration, Dave Filoni revealed that Park reprised his role as Maul for the Star Wars: The Clone Wars episode "The Phantom Apprentice" through a motion capture performance, with Witwer again providing the voice.

In 2020, it was reported by LRM Online that Lucasfilm had allegedly decided to move forward with Darth Maul without Park following the actor posting inappropriate sexual material on his Instagram account, which was later removed.

In 2022, Park was reportedly set to originally reprise his role as Maul again in the Disney+ streaming series Obi-Wan Kenobi, but his character's inclusion was dropped late into development; sources claim that Park went as far to perform some stunt training and shoot some footage, though other sources claim that Park's scenes consisted solely on test footage before the character was written out.

== Filmography ==
=== Film ===
Year	Title	Role	Notes	Ref.
1997	Mortal Kombat Annihilation	Raptor #3 / Tarkatan (Baraka) #2	Also stunt double for Robin Shou and James Remar	
1999	Star Wars: Episode I – The Phantom Menace	Darth Maul/Naboo Royal Guard	Voiced by Peter Serafinowicz; Nominated—MTV Movie Award for Best Fight (shared with Liam Neeson and Ewan McGregor); Nominated—MTV Movie Award for Best Villain	
1999	Sleepy Hollow	Headless Horseman	Apart from Christopher Walken scenes	
2000	X-Men	Mortimer Toynbee / Toad		
2002	Ballistic: Ecks vs. Sever	DIA Agent A.J. Ross		
2005	Potheads: The Movie	Mr. D.		
2006	Slayer	Acrobatic Vampire Twins		
2007	What We Do Is Secret	Brendan Mullen		
2009	Fanboys	Carl the Security Guard		
2009	G.I. Joe: The Rise of Cobra	Snake Eyes		
2009	Hellbinders	Max Lindermann		
2010	The King of Fighters	Rugal Bernstein		
2013	G.I. Joe: Retaliation	Snake Eyes		
2014	Jinn	Gabriel		
2018	Accident Man	Mac		
2018	Solo: A Star Wars Story	Darth Maul	Cameo; Voiced by Sam Witwer	
2021	City Limits	Brian Hull		

=== Television ===
Year	Title	Role	Notes	Ref.
2008	The Legend of Bruce Lee	Chuck Norris	4 episodes	
2009-2010	Heroes	Edgar	8 episodes	
2009	Spartacus: Motion Comic	Arkadios / Narrator	Voice	
2011	Nikita	London Guardian, Brendan	Episode: "Into the Dark"	
2011	Supah Ninjas	Harry	Episode: "Kickbutt"	
2012	Breaking In	Todd	Episode: "Episode XIII"	
2020	Star Wars: The Clone Wars	Maul	Episode: "The Phantom Apprentice"; motion capture; Voiced by Sam Witwer	
2022	Obi-Wan Kenobi	Maul	Episode: "Part I" (archival material)	
