= Niki Marvin =

American film producer

Nicolette Marvin, known as Niki Marvin, is an English actor and film producer active since the 1980s.

Marvin acted with Alan Rickman in a 1975 production of Guys and Dolls at the Haymarket Theatre, Leicester.

== Credits ==
- A Nightmare on Elm Street 3: Dream Warriors (1987) (associate producer)

... aka A Nightmare On Elm Street Part III (USA: closing credits title)

- Buried Alive (1990/II) (TV) (producer)
- Midnight Cabaret (1990) (producer)
- Strays (1991) (TV) (producer)
- The Shawshank Redemption (1994) (producer) Nominated for the Academy Award for Best Picture
- Buried Alive II (1997) (TV) (executive producer)
- Hope Springs Eternal: A Look Back at 'The Shawshank Redemption' (2004) (V) .... Herself
- Shawshank: The Redeeming Feature (2001) (TV) .... Herself
