= William Atherton =

American actor (born 1947)

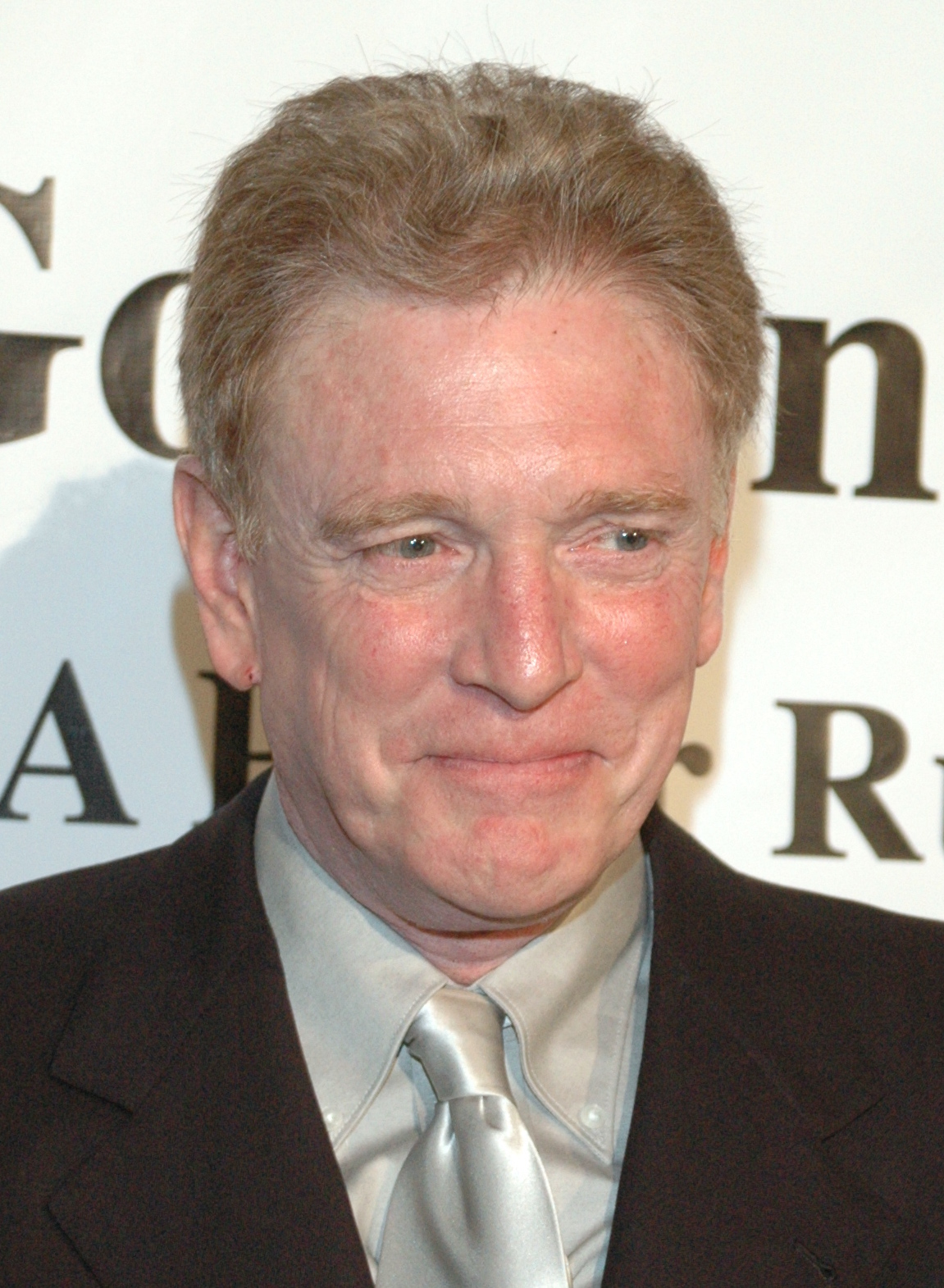
- Atherton in 2009
- Born: William Atherton Knight; July 30, 1947 (age 79); Orange, Connecticut, U.S.
- Education: Carnegie Mellon University (BFA)
- Occupation: Actor
- Years active: 1972–present
- Spouse: Bobbi Goldin (m. 1980)

William Atherton Knight (born July 30, 1947) is an American actor. He had starring roles in The Sugarland Express (1974), The Day of the Locust (1975), The Hindenburg (1975) and Looking for Mr. Goodbar (1977), but is most recognized for what have become iconic roles in the Ghostbusters and Die Hard film series.

== Early life ==
Atherton was born July 30, 1947, in Orange, Connecticut. He studied acting at the Drama School at Carnegie Tech and graduated from Carnegie Mellon University in 1969.

== Career ==
Atherton was successful on the New York stage immediately after graduating and worked with many of the country's leading playwrights including David Rabe, John Guare, and Arthur Miller, winning numerous awards for his work on and off Broadway.

He got his big break playing hapless fugitive Clovis Poplin in The Sugarland Express (1974), the feature film debut of Steven Spielberg. After this, he garnered major roles in dark dramas such as The Day of the Locust (1975) and Looking for Mr. Goodbar (1977), as well as the big-budget disaster film The Hindenburg (1975). He provided lead vocals for "What'll I Do", the main title theme for the Robert Redford film version of The Great Gatsby.

Atherton also starred as cowboy Jim Lloyd in the miniseries Centennial (1978), based on the novel by James Michener. He appeared in the comedy Ghostbusters (1984) as the officious and condescending EPA agent Walter Peck.

Martha Coolidge chose Atherton to play Professor Jerry Hathaway in the teen comedy Real Genius (1985). He played reporter Richard "Dick" Thornburg in the blockbuster action film Die Hard (1988), and reprised the role in its sequel Die Hard 2 (1990).

Other film credits include No Mercy (1986), The Pelican Brief (1993), Bio-Dome (1996), Mad City (1997), The Crow: Salvation (2000), The Last Samurai (2003), Grim Prairie Tales (1990), the TV movies Buried Alive (1990), Headspace (2005) and Virus (1995). He has also made guest appearances on such television series as The Twilight Zone, Murder, She Wrote, Desperate Housewives, Law & Order, The Equalizer, Boston Legal, Castle and Monk. Atherton provided the voice of Dr. Destiny on Justice League. He had a recurring role in NBC's detective drama Life.

His 2007 appearances included the film The Girl Next Door, an adaptation of the best-selling Jack Ketchum novel of the same name. He also reprised his role as Walter Peck in Ghostbusters: The Video Game, released on June 16, 2009.

Atherton was cast in the final season of ABC's Lost. He appeared in the musical Gigi for the Reprise Theatre in Los Angeles as "Honoré Lachailles" in 2011.

Following his work on the musical, he stepped into a comedic role in Tim and Eric's Billion Dollar Movie (2012), produced by Will Ferrell's Funny or Die, Gary Sanchez Productions and Abso Lutely Productions.

In summer 2014, Atherton was cast in a recurring role as Viceroy Mercado in the Syfy series Defiance's second season.

Atherton co-starred in the 2017 Netflix thriller, Clinical, and appears in several upcoming documentaries on his most iconic films. The first to be released is Cleanin' Up the Town: Remembering Ghostbusters (2019) which features the original 1984 cast.

In 2024, Atherton reprised his role as Walter Peck, now the mayor of New York City, in the film Ghostbusters: Frozen Empire.

== Personal life ==
Atherton has been married to writer Bobbi Goldin since December 8, 1980. On The Phil Donahue Show in 1981, Atherton claimed that he was once homosexual but changed due to the Aesthetic Realism of Eli Siegel.

Atherton has sung in various productions in later years. In 2011, he performed "I Remember It Well," a popular song from Gigi with his former Reprise Theater co-star, Millicent Martin, at a sold-out performance in Palm Springs for Michael Childers's One Night Only, benefiting the Jewish Family Service of the Desert. He returned in 2013 to the same sold-out event to sing the classic, "Isn't It Romantic?"

Atherton appeared with his former Centennial costar Stephanie Zimbalist in the Gregory Peck Reading Series, a project of the Library Foundation of Los Angeles benefiting the Los Angeles Public Library. Roddy McDowall was host for the event.

In December 2018, Atherton participated in the Library Foundation's reading of excerpts from book editor and critic, David Kipen's best-seller, Dear Los Angeles: The City in Diaries and Letters, 1542 to 2018.

== Filmography ==
=== Film ===
Year	Title	Role	Notes
1972	The New Centurions	Johnson	
1973	Class of '44	Fraternity President	
1974	The Great Gatsby	Singing voice for "What'll I Do"	
1974	The Sugarland Express	Clovis Michael Poplin	
1975	The Day of the Locust	Tod Hackett	
1975	The Hindenburg	Karl Boerth	
1976	Independence	Benjamin Rush	
1977	Looking for Mr. Goodbar	James	
1984	Ghostbusters	Walter Peck	
1985	Real Genius	Professor Jerry Hathaway	
1986	No Mercy	Allan Deveneux	
1988	Die Hard	Richard Thornburg	
1990	Die Hard 2	Richard Thornburg	
1990	Grim Prairie Tales: Hit the Trail... to Terror	Arthur	
1991	Oscar	Overton	
1993	The Pelican Brief	Bob Gminski	
1994	Saints and Sinners	Terence McCone	
1994	Frank & Jesse	Allan Pinkerton	
1996	Bio-Dome	Dr. Noah Faulkner	
1997	Hoodlum	Thomas Dewey	
1997	Mad City	Malt Dohlen	
1998	Michael Kael vs. the World News Company	James Denit	
1999	The Stranger	Arthur	
2000	The Crow: Salvation	Nathan Randall	
2000	Bread and Roses	Himself – Party Guest	Uncredited
2001	Burning Down the House	Arthur Kranston	
2001	Race to Space	Ralph Stanton	
2003	The Last Samurai	Mr. McCabe, Winchester Rep	
2003	Who's Your Daddy?	Uncle Duncan "Duncay" Mack	
2005	Into the Sun	Agent Block	
2005	Headspace	Dr. Ira Gold	
2007	Kush	King	
2007	Hacia la oscuridad	John	
2007	Totally Baked	Mr. Lyle Funonion	Segment: "FunOnion Boardroom"
2007	The Girl Next Door	Adult David Moran	
2008	Black Crescent Moon	Jo Dexton	
2010	The Kane Files: Life of Trial	Daniel Morgan	
2012	Tim and Eric's Billion Dollar Movie	Earle Swinter	
2012	Jersey Shore Shark Attack	Dolan	
2012	The Citizen	Winston	
2013	Getting Back to Zero		
2014	Jinn	Father Westhoff	
2017	Clinical	Terry Drummond	
2018	Bad Company		
2019	Cleanin' Up the Town: Remembering Ghostbusters	Himself	Documentary film
2024	Ghostbusters: Frozen Empire	Mayor Walter Peck	
2025	Where Did the Adults Go?	The Father	

=== Television ===
Year	Title	Role	Notes
1978–1979	Centennial	Jim Lloyd	9 episodes Miniseries
1981	The House of Mirth	Lawrence Selden	Television film
1983	Malibu	Stan Harvey	Television film
1985, 1987	The Twilight Zone	Mr. Dundee/Brian Wolfe	2 episodes
1985, 1987, 1991	Murder, She Wrote	Larry Holleran/Greg Dalton/Andy Henley	3 episodes
1987	The Equalizer	Martin "Alpha" Loeber	Episode: "Blood and Wine"
1989	The Equalizer	Gideon	Episode: "17 Zebra"
1990	Buried Alive	Cortland "Cort" van Owen	Television film
1991	Tales from the Crypt	Malcolm Mayflower	Episode: "Easel Kill Ya"
1992	Diagnosis: Murder – Diagnosis of Murder	Eric Walker	Television film
1995	Virus	Dr. Reginald Holloway	Television film
1996	Nash Bridges	Dr. Linus Mills	Episode: "Key Witness"
1997, 1999	The Practice	D.A. Keith Pratt	3 episodes
1998	The Outer Limits	Franklin Murdoch	Episode: "To Tell the Truth"
1999	Introducing Dorothy Dandridge	Darryl Zanuck	Television film
2001	Night Visions	William Price	Episode: "Hate Puppet/Darkness"; Segment: "Hate Puppet"
2002, 2004	Law & Order	Don Snyder/Dan Jensen	2 episodes
2003	Justice League	John Dee / Doctor Destiny	2 episodes Voice
2005	Boston Legal	A.D.A. Howard Zale	Episode: "It Girls and Beyond"
2006	Stargate SG-1	Varta	Episode: "Collateral Damage"
2006	Desperate Housewives	Dr. Barr	2 episodes
2007	Numb3rs	Warren Pierce	Episode: "Tabu"
2008	Monk	Commander Nathan Whitaker	Episode: “Mr. Monk Is Underwater”
2008–2009	Life	Mickey Rayborn	8 episodes
2010	Lost	Principal Donald Reynolds	Episode: "Dr. Linus"
2010	Law & Order: Special Victims Unit	Ned Bogden	Episode: "Bedtime"
2011	Castle	Dr. Ari Weiss	Episode: "Head Case"
2012	Workaholics	Thor Holmvik	Episode: "The Meat Jerking Beef Boys"
2013	Defiance	Viceroy Berto Mercado	5 episodes

=== Video games ===
Year	Title	Role	Notes
2009	Ghostbusters: The Video Game	Walter Peck	Voice
2019	Planet Coaster	Walter Peck	Voice
2019	Ghostbusters: The Video Game Remastered	Walter Peck	Voice
