= Perfect Mismatch =

- Theatrical poster
- Directed by: Ajmal Zaheer Ahmad
- Produced by: Xperience Films
- Starring: Anubhav Anand; Nandana Sen; Anupam Kher; Boman Irani
- Cinematography: Robert Mehnert
- Release date: 24 July 2009
- Country: India
- Language: English

Perfect Mismatch (formerly known as It's a Mismatch) is a Bollywood film directed by Ajmal Zaheer Ahmad.

== Plot summary ==
Mr. Bhalla (Anupam Kher) is a Punjabi living in United States with his wife, daughter and nephew Aman (Anubhav Anand). Aman is in love with Neha (Nandana Sen), daughter of Mr. Patel (Boman Irani), a conventional Gujarati. Although the two are in love, their families have huge differences due to drastically different lifestyles. In the end, it's up to Aman and Neha to not only bring their families together but to live up to their expectations.

== Cast ==
- Anubhav Anand as Aman Bhalla
- Nandana Sen as Neha Patel
- Anupam Kher as Sukhwinder Bhalla
- Boman Irani as Dinesh Patel
- Sheel Gupta as Preeti Bhalla
- Geeta Sugandh as Mrs. Shah
- Kanaiya Sugandh as Mr. Shah
- Osman Soykut as Mr. Brenner
- Rashmi Rustagi as Meena Patel

== Release ==
Perfect Mismatch was produced under the banner Xperience Films and had a limited release in India. The film was originally titled It's A Mismatch, but the producers had to change to title as it was not available. The film was released contemporaneously with another Bollywood film, Luck, which adversely affected its ticket sales. Perfect Mismatch didn't perform well at the box office in India, but had a successful festival run in the United States. It was an official selection at one of the top 10 International Film Festivals - Cinequest Film Festival. The original songs for the soundtrack were composed by the Montreal-based group, Josh.
