= Dreamland (2006 film) =

- Movie poster
- Directed by: Jason Matzner
- Written by: Tom Willett
- Produced by: Peter Heller; Doug Mankoff; Andrew Spaulding
- Starring: Agnes Bruckner; Kelli Garner; Justin Long; John Corbett; Gina Gershon; Chris Mulkey; Luce Rains; Brian Klugman
- Cinematography: Jonathan Sela
- Edited by: Zene Baker
- Music by: Anthony Marinelli; Photek
- Distributed by: Echo Lake Productions
- Release date: December 19, 2006
- Running time: 88 minutes
- Country: United States
- Language: English

Dreamland is an American drama film that was released on December 19, 2006. The primary plot focuses concern overcoming fear, struggling friend to friend relationships, and overall coming of age in small-town America.

== Plot ==
Eighteen-year-old Audrey (Agnes Bruckner) lives with her agoraphobic father (John Corbett) in a remote community in the breathtakingly beautiful New Mexico desert. Though Audrey longs to go to college, she spends her days taking care of her father, who hasn’t left home since Audrey’s mother died, and her best friend Calista (Kelli Garner), who dreams of becoming Miss America but is struggling with multiple sclerosis.

The summer after Audrey graduates from high school, her world is changed forever when an attractive young man named Mookie (Justin Long) moves in next door with his mother Mary (Gina Gershon) and her fiancé, Herb (Chris Mulkey). Knowing how much Calista longs for romance, Audrey encourages Mookie to ask Calista on a date. He obliges, and he and Calista soon become a couple. Audrey, however, finds herself developing feelings for Mookie, and as these feelings grow it becomes harder and harder for her to be the dependable, selfless person that her father and best friend have always counted on her to be.

Ultimately, Audrey, who has taken care of everyone around her, finally learns to take care of herself, and those whose lives she touched must find the strength to let her go.

== Reception ==
On Rotten Tomatoes, the film holds an approval rating of 67% based on 15 reviews, with an average rating of 6/10. At Metacritic, the film has a weighted average score of 57 out of 100, based on 5 critics, indicating "mixed or average" reviews.
