= The Anna Nicole Story =

- DVD cover
- Based on: Life of Anna Nicole Smith
- Written by: Joe Batteer; John Rice
- Directed by: Mary Harron
- Starring: Agnes Bruckner; Martin Landau; Adam Goldberg; Cary Elwes; Virginia Madsen
- Theme music composer: Zack Ryan; Michael Stern
- Country of origin: United States
- Original language: English

Production
- Producers: Neil Meron; Robert J. Wilson
- Cinematography: Heather R. Dumas
- Editors: Ann Dingeman; Cary Israel
- Running time: 105 minutes
- Production companies: Storyline Entertainment; Sony Pictures Television

Original release
- Network: Lifetime
- Release: June 29, 2013

The Anna Nicole Story (also known as Anna Nicole) is an American biographical drama television film about late actress and Playboy Playmate Anna Nicole Smith. The film stars Agnes Bruckner as Smith and was distributed by Lifetime Movie Network. It premiered on June 29, 2013.

== Plot ==
The movie depicted the tragic life of model Anna Nicole Smith from small town dancer to Playboy centerfold, to her marriage to a billionaire, and her death in 2007.

== Cast ==
- Agnes Bruckner as Anna Nicole Smith
  - Alexa Blair as 14-Year Old Anna Nicole Smith
  - Julia Walters as 7-Year Old Anna Nicole Smith
- Martin Landau as J. Howard Marshall
- Adam Goldberg as Howard K. Stern
- Cary Elwes as E. Pierce Marshall
- Virginia Madsen as Virgie Arthur
- Graham Patrick Martin as Daniel Wayne Smith
  - Caleb Barwick as Middle Daniel Wayne Smith
  - Luke Donaldson as Young Daniel Wayne Smith
  - Gavyn Tyler Dye as Toddler Daniel Wayne Smith
  - Jackson Walters as Baby Daniel Wayne Smith
- Donny Boaz as Larry Birkhead
- Cristina Franco as Sylvan
- Jay Huguley as Lawfton
- Billy Slaughter as Producer

== See also ==
- List of American films of 2013
