= Spiritual test =

A spiritual test, according to several religious traditions, is a life situation, provided by God, to evaluate man's individual moral character and obedience to His laws. Spiritual tests assess one's virtue in many aspects of everyday life, individual conduct, particularly when no witnesses exist, and reflect the maturation of the character with regards to such moral imperatives as honesty, respect, and consideration for others.

== Overview ==
A spiritual agreement, pact or covenant is established between the individual believer and God. God tests the person's resolve in this covenant by giving that person physical, mental, emotional and spiritual difficulties to overcome. It is a common belief in many religions that God does not test humanity beyond their capacity to handle these tests, which are designed to check their full commitment to their own Faith.

== In religious books ==
Judaism

“For I command you today to love Yahuwah your Elohim, to walk in his ways, and to keep his commands, decrees and laws; then you will live and increase, and Yahuwah your Elohim will bless you in the land you are entering to possess. But if your heart turns away and you are not obedient, and if you are drawn away to bow down to other gods and worship them, I declare to you this day that you will certainly be destroyed. You will not live long in the land you are crossing the Yarden to enter and possess. “(Devarim 30:15-18)

Christianity

"It was there at Marah that the LORD set before them the following decree as a standard to test their faithfulness to him. He said, 'If you will listen carefully to the voice of the LORD your God and do what is right in his sight, obeying his commands and keeping all his decrees, then I will not make you suffer any of the diseases I sent on the Egyptians; for I am the LORD who heals you'"

"No testing has overtaken you that is not common to everyone. God is faithful, and he will not let you be tested beyond your strength, but with the testing he will also provide the way out so that you may be able to endure it" (1 Corinthians:10:13, New Revised Standard Version).

Islam

“Sa’ad bin Abi Waqqas reported that he asked the Messenger of Allah (SAW): “Which of the people are tested most severely?” Rasulullah (SAW) replied: “The Prophets, then the righteous, then those who are most like them, then those who are most like them from the people. A man is tested according to his religious commitment. So, if his religious practice is sound, then his testing is increased, and if his religious practice is weak, then his testing is reduced. A servant continues to be tested until he walks the Earth without a single sin on him.” (Ahmad, Tirmidhi)

“Allah will not leave the believers in the state in which you are now until He distinguishes the wicked from the good.” (Surah Al ‘Imrân 3:179, Quran)

Baháʼí Faith

“The more one is severed from the world, from desires, from human affairs, and conditions, the more impervious does one become to the tests of God. Tests are a means by which a soul is measured as to its fitness, and proven out by its own acts. God knows its fitness beforehand, and also its unpreparedness, but man, with an ego, would not believe himself unfit unless proof were given him. Consequently his susceptibility to evil is proven to him when he falls into the tests, and the tests are continued until the soul realizes its own unfitness, then remorse and regret tend to root out the weakness.

The same test comes again in greater degree, until it is shown that a former weakness has become a strength, and the power to overcome evil has been established”

== As a means for spiritual growth ==
Baha’i Writing

“Thou hast written concerning the tests that have come upon thee. To the sincere ones, tests are as a gift from God, the Exalted, for a heroic person hasteneth, with the utmost joy and gladness, to the tests of a violent battlefield, but the coward is afraid and trembles and utters moaning and lamentation. Likewise, an expert student prepareth and memorizeth his lessons and exercises with the utmost effort, and in the day of examination he appeareth with infinite joy before the master. Likewise, the pure gold shineth radiantly in the fire of test. Consequently, it is made clear that for holy souls, trials are as the gift of God, the Exalted; but for weak souls they are an unexpected calamity. This test is just as thou hast written: it removeth the rust of egotism from the mirror of the heart until the Sun of Truth may shine therein. For, no veil is greater than egotism and no matter how thin that covering may be, yet it will finally veil man entirely and prevent him from receiving a portion from the eternal bounty.“

== See also ==
- Spiritual distress
