= Agnes Bruckner =

American actress (born 1985)

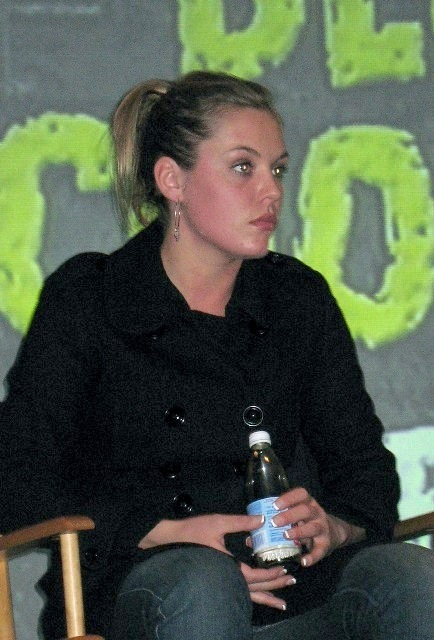
- Bruckner promoting Blood & Chocolate in 2007
- Born: August 16, 1985 (age 41); Los Angeles, California, U.S.
- Occupations: Actress, model
- Years active: 1996–present
- Children: 2

Agnes Bruckner (born August 16, 1985) is an American actress and former model. She began acting in television in the late 1990s and appeared in several films, including The Woods, Blue Car, Murder by Numbers, Blood & Chocolate, The Anna Nicole Story, The 11th Green, and Private Practice.

== Early life ==
Bruckner was born in Los Angeles, California, to a Hungarian father and a Russian mother who have since divorced; her grandfather is German. Her parents met in Hungary and emigrated to the U.S. in 1984 through a refugee camp in Italy.

Bruckner speaks some Russian and is fluent in Hungarian, having spoken that language since birth. She had studied dance, ballet, and tap since the age of five, intending a career as a dancer. At age eight, Bruckner appeared in a beauty pageant while working as a child model at her mother's suggestion. Bruckner was raised in the Los Feliz section of Los Angeles until age five, then in Portland, Oregon until age ten, when her family moved to Burbank for her to pursue an acting career in Los Angeles.

== Career ==
Bruckner began her career at age 11. She appeared in commercials, in a few television pilots, and on the daytime soap opera The Bold and the Beautiful as Bridget Forrester from 1997 to 1999. At age 15, Bruckner got her first lead role in the independent film Blue Car (2002), in which she played a high school student involved in an affair with her teacher, played by David Strathairn. Film critic Roger Ebert wrote that Bruckner "negotiates this difficult script with complete conviction." Bruckner received an Independent Spirit Award nomination for "Best Female Lead" for the role.

In the 2000s, other minor roles in television and film followed, including roles in the thrillers The Glass House (2001) and the Sandra Bullock vehicle Murder by Numbers (2002). Bruckner has appeared in episodes of the television series 24 and Alias. She starred in the horror films Venom (2005) and The Woods (2006). Also in 2006, she appeared in the drama Peaceful Warrior opposite Scott Mechlowicz and received a ShoWest Female Star of Tomorrow Award and played the lead role in Dreamland.

Bruckner appeared in the horror/romance film Blood and Chocolate (2007) and Say Hello to Stan Talmadge (2008), Kill Theory (2008), Vacancy 2: The First Cut (2009), and The Craigslist Killer (2011).

On October 3, 2012, Bruckner was cast to play Anna Nicole Smith in a Lifetime original movie The Anna Nicole Story. In 2020, Bruckner played the female lead in the film The 11th Green.

== Personal life ==
In March 2016, Bruckner gave birth to her son. In April 2019, she gave birth to her daughter. The father of both of Bruckner's children is ex-boyfriend Alefaio Brewer.

== Filmography ==
=== Film ===
Year	Title	Role	Notes
1997	Girl	Lydia	Short film
1998	The Shrunken City	Lori	Direct-to-video
2001	The Glass House	Zoe	
2002	Blue Car	Megan 'Meg' Denning	
2002	Home Room	Cathy	
2002	Murder by Numbers	Lisa Mills	
2003	Rick	Eve O'Lette	
2004	Stateside	Sue Dubois	
2004	Haven	Pippa Ridley	
2005	The Iris Effect	Katya	
2005	Venom	Eden Sinclair	
2006	Dreamland	Audrey	
2006	The Woods	Heather Fasulo	
2006	Peaceful Warrior	Susie	
2007	Blood & Chocolate	Vivian Gandillon	
2008	Vacancy 2: The First Cut	Jessica	Direct-to-video
2009	Kill Theory	Jennifer	
2009	A Good Funeral	Junior	
2011	Open Gate	Jesselyn	
2012	Breaking the Girls	Sara Ryan	
2012	The Pact	Nicole Barlow	
2012	The Millionaire Tour	Billie	
2012	The Baytown Outlaws	Mona	
2012	The Citizen	Diane	
2013	Wrong Cops	Julia Kieffer	
2014	A Bit of Bad Luck	Heather	
2015	There Is A New World Somewhere	Sylvia	
2018	Back Fork	Raylene	
2019	The Murder of Nicole Brown Simpson	Kris Jenner	
2020	The 11th Green	Laurie Larkspur	
2026	The Roots	Martha	

=== Television ===
Year	Title	Role	Notes
1997–1999	The Bold and the Beautiful	Bridget Forrester	66 episodes, soap opera
2000	American Adventure	Sydney	Television film
2000	Pacific Blue	Connie Lamb	Episode: "Fifty-Nine Minutes"
2001	The Fugitive	Mallory Wickes	Episode: "Safekeeping"
2001	Touched by an Angel	Lisa	Episode: "Visions of Thy Father"
2002	Alias	Kelly McNeil	Episodes: "The Box: Parts 1 & 2"
2003	24	Linda	Recurring role (season 3)
2006	Law & Order: Criminal Intent	May	Episode: "Country Crossover"
2009	Dirty Sexy Money	Daphne	Episode: "The Bad Guy"
2009	Private Practice	Heather	5 episodes
2011	The Craigslist Killer	Megan McAllister	Television film
2011	Hawaii Five-0	Tanya	Episode: "Kai e' e"
2012	Fairly Legal	Lea Ferran	Episode: "Ripple of Hope"
2012	Covert Affairs	Zarya Fischer	Episodes: "Let's Dance", "Rock 'n' Roll Suicide"
2013	The Anna Nicole Story	Anna Nicole Smith	Television film
2015	The Returned	Deputy Nikki Banks	Main cast
2015	Once Upon a Time	Lilith "Lily" Page/Starla	3 episodes
