= Blue Car =

- Theatrical release poster
- Directed by: Karen Moncrieff
- Written by: Karen Moncrieff
- Produced by: Peer J. Oppenheimer; Amy Sommer; David Waters
- Starring: David Strathairn; Agnes Bruckner; Margaret Colin; Frances Fisher
- Cinematography: Rob Sweeney
- Edited by: Toby Yates
- Music by: Adam Gorgoni
- Distributed by: Miramax Films
- Release dates: January 11, 2002 (Sundance Film Festival); May 2, 2003 (United States)
- Running time: 96 minutes
- Country: United States
- Language: English
- Budget: $500,000
- Box office: $476,551

Blue Car is a 2002 American drama film directed and written by Karen Moncrieff. It was the first film she directed and wrote. The film stars David Strathairn, Agnes Bruckner, Margaret Colin, and Frances Fisher.

Blue Car had its world premiere at the 2002 Sundance Film Festival, where it was acquired by Miramax Films. It was given a limited release in North American theaters on May 2, 2003.

== Plot ==
Meg is a high school senior living in the Dayton, Ohio area. She uses writing as an outlet for her troubled home life, having been abandoned by her father and now neglected by her mother Diane, whose busy work schedule leaves Meg as the babysitter for her younger sister, Lily. The girls' father does not pay child support, causing financial strain for the family. After Meg reads aloud a poem (titled "Blue Car") in her English class, her teacher, Mr. Auster, recognizes her talent and assumes the role of a mentor and father figure for her. He encourages Meg to enter a local poetry competition, which she ends up winning. Mr. Auster recommends she next compete at the national competition in Florida during spring break.

Meg's home life worsens when Lily displays increasingly worrying emotional behavior; she cuts herself, refuses to eat, and speaks about becoming an angel. After being checked into the psychiatric ward of a hospital, Lily kills herself by jumping out of an open window as she tries to "fly". A distraught Meg finds solace in Mr. Auster, who reveals he lost a son. During their one-on-one poetry tutoring, she learns he is also writing a novel.

When Diane says she does not have the money to pay for her daughter's Florida trip, Meg resorts to stealing. This results in Meg getting fired from her after-school job and her moving out to stay with her friend, Georgia. At Georgia’s place, Meg becomes acquainted with Georgia’s older brother, Pat. When she tells Pat she’s trying to find a way to get to Florida, he offers her a way to make money by stealing prescription drugs. Meg takes up the offer and steals from a pharmacy for him. The following day, Meg discovers that Pat has skipped town with the money.

Meg ends up taking a bus by herself to Florida and sleeps on the beach. On the day before the competition, she spots Mr. Auster with his family relaxing near the water. When she walks over to say hi, his wife Delia invites her to join them. When Mr. Auster is not paying attention, Delia makes a comment to Meg that hints that their marriage is troubled. Later, Mr. Auster walks alone with Meg on the beach and kisses her. They go to a hotel room, where Meg reluctantly has sex with Mr. Auster. He stops after realizing that she is not comfortable with the situation. Meg learns that Mr. Auster has not written a novel at all, and that it was all just a ruse to impress her.

At the competition the following day, Meg leaves her "Blue Car" poem on her chair when she is called to the mic. She recites a new poem in which she subtly denounces Mr. Auster for manipulating her and abusing his authority. In the audience, Mr. Auster and his wife look visibly uncomfortable. After finishing her reading, Meg leaves the auditorium, and, later on the beach alone, she throws the old poem into the water. Meg returns to Ohio and goes to Diane’s apartment, where she has an emotional reconciliation with her mother. Diane leaves Meg a box containing old wedding photos of her and Meg’s father. The next day, Meg, who is now going to live with her father, gets into a blue car with him and they drive off.

== Cast ==
- Agnes Bruckner as Meg Denning
- David Strathairn as Auster
- Margaret Colin as Diane
- Frances Fisher as Delia
- A. J. Buckley as Pat
- Regan Arnold as Lily
- Sarah Buehler as Georgia
- Dustin Sterling as Rob
- Mike Ward as Dad
- Wayne Armstrong as Don
- Andrew Gottschlich as Tall Boy
- Tommy Gottschlich as Taller Boy

== Production ==
Karen Moncrieff wrote the screenplay for the film thinking it would not be produced because it was so "uncommercial", but it won the Nicholl Fellowship from the Academy of Motion Picture Arts and Sciences in 1998.

The role of Auster was written with David Strathairn in mind. Moncrieff named the character Auster because she saw a photo of the author Paul Auster and thought Strathairn resembled him.

Blue Car was filmed primarily in Dayton, with two days in Oxnard, California. Principal photography, which began in June 2001, took 20 days.

== Reception ==
=== Release ===
Blue Car premiered at the 2002 Sundance Film Festival. It was acquired by Miramax for one million dollars and given a limited theatrical release on May 2, 2003. It also screened at the Toronto International Film Festival.

=== Home media ===
Blue Car was released on DVD on October 14, 2003 in the United States and Canada. It was released on Blu-ray by Via Vision Entertainment on August 30, 2023.

=== Critical reception ===
On review aggregator website Rotten Tomatoes, the film has an approval rating of 81% based on 89 reviews. The website's critical consensus states that the film is "a cautionary tale that rings true." On Metacritic, the film has a weighted average score of 76 out of 100, based on 31 critics, indicating "generally favorable" reviews.

In a positive review, Lisa Schwarzbaum of Entertainment Weekly compared Moncrieff to Scottish filmmaker Lynne Ramsay, writing "Each has a knockout storytelling voice and works with a raw, innately feminine strength that scrubs away the soapy film from sad sagas." Writing on David Strathairn's performance, Stephen Holden of The New York Times said his "complex, exquisitely nuanced portrayal of a man who goes over the line allows his character to be both hero and villain, sometimes at once." Agnes Bruckner was lauded for what many critics called a breakout performance. Mark Caro of the Chicago Tribune wrote Bruckner "delivers an indelible portrait of a girl on the brink of womanhood finding her own artistic voice and sense of purpose."

Though some critics, like Kenneth Turan of the Los Angeles Times, cited the film's more melodramatic turns as drawbacks, they still praised the film as sensitively directed and well-acted. Roger Ebert of the Chicago Sun-Times gave the film 3 and 1/2 stars out 4. He decried the film's R rating, reasoning the film has "no nudity, no explicit sex and only ordinary adolescent language", and lamenting the fact that young people who would benefit from seeing this "valuable cautionary tale" would not be able to see it.

Claudia Puig of USA Today wrote, "Primarily a character study, Blue Car has the feel of a novel in which the characters linger in one's memory well after the book has been read," and that the film "is like an unpolished sapphire, at once harshly realistic and resplendent." The film was also New York's pick for "sleeper hit of the fall."

=== Awards and nominations ===
- Chicago International Film Festival
  - New Directors Competition - Karen Moncrieff (nominee)
- Independent Spirit Awards
  - Best First Screenplay - Karen Moncrieff (nominee)
  - Best Female Lead - Agnes Bruckner (nominee)
- Woodstock Film Festival
  - Honorable Mention for Best Feature Film - Karen Moncrieff (won)
