= A Bit of Bad Luck =

- Film poster
- Directed by: John Fuhrman
- Written by: John Fuhrman
- Story by: John Fuhrman
- Produced by: Mykel Dennis; Stephen J. Lineweaver; Gerrarda O’Beirne
- Starring: Cary Elwes
- Cinematography: Matthew Irving
- Edited by: Sandra Granovsky
- Music by: David Buckley
- Release date: April 17, 2014 (Boston)
- Running time: 86 minutes
- Country: United States
- Language: English

A Bit of Bad Luck is a 2014 American thriller comedy film written and directed by John Fuhrman and starring Cary Elwes. It is set in Seattle, and was filmed in Seattle and Morton, Washington.

== Cast ==
- Cary Elwes as Brooks
- Teri Polo as Amanda
- Agnes Bruckner as Heather
- Marshall Bell as Mr. Creech
