= The Citizen (film) =

- Directed by: Sam Kadi
- Written by: Sam Kadi; Jazmen Darnell Brown; Samir Younis
- Produced by: Sam Kadi; Noel Alan Vega; Chris Wyatt
- Starring: Khaled El Nabawy; Agnes Bruckner; Rizwan Manji; William Atherton; Cary Elwes; Ajmal Zaheer Ahmad
- Cinematography: Joseph White
- Edited by: Mike Saenz
- Music by: Christopher Brady
- Production company: 3K Pictures
- Distributed by: Monterey Media (US)
- Release date: September 20, 2012 (Boston Film Festival)
- Running time: 99 minutes
- Country: United States
- Languages: English; Arabic

The Citizen is a 2013 American drama independent film directed by Sam Kadi, written by Sam Kadi, Samir Younis, Jazmen Darnell Brown, and starring Khaled El Nabawy, Agnes Bruckner, Rizwan Manji, William Atherton, and Cary Elwes. The Citizen was filmed in New York City, Detroit Masonic Temple in Detroit Michigan, and the Detroit Metropolitan Wayne County Airport in Michigan. The film premiered on September 20, 2012, at the Boston Film Festival.

== Plot ==
The Citizen integrates many true stories of the difficulties and triumphs that Arab-Americans face in 21st-century America. The story follows an Arab immigrant who wins the American green card lottery and arrives in New York City on September 10, 2001 (the day before the September 11th terrorist attacks). The events of 9/11 change the struggles he faces on his way to live out the American Dream.

== Cast ==
- Khaled El Nabawy as Ibrahim
- Agnes Bruckner as Diane
- Rizwan Manji as "Mo"
- William Atherton as Winston
- Cary Elwes as Miller
- Ajmal Zaheer Ahmad as Rajiv
- Cole Corey as Josh
- Kerry Birmingham as Nancy

== Production ==
=== Development ===
The Citizen is Sam Kadi's feature film debut. The film was written by director/producer Sam Kadi, Samir Younis, and Jazmen Darnell Brown.

=== Filming ===
The film was shot in New York City, Detroit Masonic Temple in Detroit Michigan, and the Detroit Metropolitan Wayne County Airport in Michigan.

== Release ==
In May 2013, Monterey Media brought the United States distribution rights from the production company 3K Pictures. Radiant Films International handles the foreign rights to the film. Radiant Films International CEO Mimi Steinbauer and President presented the film to buyers in Cannes in 2013. The film was released on DVD and VOD in the United States and Canada on November 12, 2013.

=== Festivals and awards ===
The Citizen was selected to screen at the following film festivals:

- 2012 Boston Film Festival - Winner Best Ensemble Cast & Mass Impact Award
- 2013 International Family Film Festival - Winner Best Feature Drama
- 2012 Tri Media Film Festival - Winner Director's Choice Award & Best Actor Award Agnes Bruckner
- 2012 Hollywood Film Festival - Nominated for Discovery Award
- 2013 Cinequest Film Festival - Nominated for Audience Choice Award
- 2012 Abu Dhabi Film Festival
- 2012 Heartland Film Festival
- 2012 Gotham Screen International Film Festival
- 2013 Shanghai International Film Festival
