= Julio Navarro =

Julio Navarro can refer to the following people:

- Julio Navarro (astrophysicist) (born 1962), Argentine professor of astronomy
- Julio Navarro (baseball) (1934–2018), Puerto Rican baseball player

== See also ==
- Julio Navarrine
- Julia Navarro
