= Luca Ward =

Italian actor and voice actor

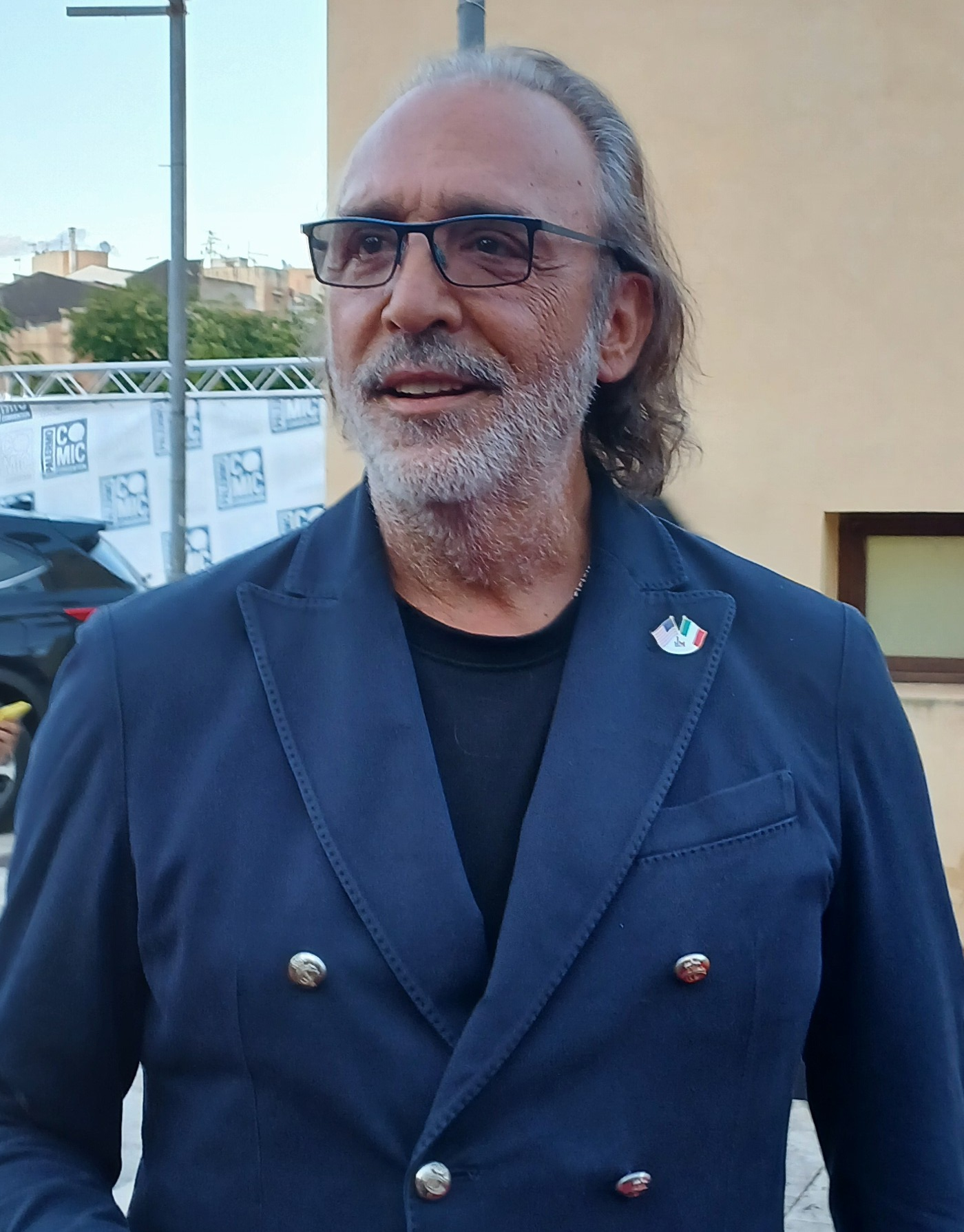
- Ward at Palermo Comic Convention in 2025
- Born: Ostia, Italy
- Occupations: Actor; voice actor; dubbing director
- Years active: 1981–present
- Spouses: Claudia Razzi (m. 1983; div. 2004) Giada Desideri (m. 2013)
- Children: 3, including Guendalina Ward
- Parents: Aleardo Ward (father); Maresa Ward (mother)
- Relatives: Monica Ward (sister); Andrea Ward (brother); Jone Romano (grandmother); Carlo Romano (step-grandfather)

Luca Ward is an Italian actor and voice actor.

== Biography ==
Born in Ostia, which is near Rome, and the oldest child of actor Aleardo Ward, brother of Andrea and Monica Ward, Luca Ward has American ancestry on his father's side: his paternal grandfather was a U.S. Marine during World War I. Ward made his debut appearance on television in 1963. His film roles include the 1984 teen-comedy film Chewingum directed by Biagio Proietti. He was also renowned for his role as Massimo Forti in the soap opera CentoVetrine.

Ward is well known to the Italian public as a voice-dubbing artist. He is the official Italian voice of Pierce Brosnan, Samuel L. Jackson, Keanu Reeves and Russell Crowe, as well as occasionally dubbing Hugh Grant, Brandon Lee, Gerard Butler, Antonio Banderas and Jean-Claude Van Damme in some of their works. He dubbed voices in most of their films and he also provided the Italian voice of James Bond during his portrayal by Pierce Brosnan. In his animated roles, Ward dubbed Dr. Facilier in The Princess and the Frog as well as the title character in the Corto Maltese cartoons and Sam Fisher in the Splinter Cell video game franchise.

In 2010, Ward was a contestant on the reality show L'Isola dei Famosi but he left after a week due to an injury in the vertebral column.

=== Personal life ===
Ward was previously married to voice actress Claudia Razzi from 1983 until 2004. Their daughter Guendalina is also a voice actress. He also has an additional two children with his current wife Giada Desideri, Lupo (born 2007) and Luna (born 2009).

== Filmography ==
=== Cinema ===
| Year | Title | Role(s) | Notes |
|---|---|---|---|
| 1984 | Chewingum | Luca | |
| 1991 | Barocco | DJ | Cameo appearance |
| 1999 | The Legend of the Titanic | Barone Van Der Tilt (voice) | Animated film |
| 2001 | The House of Chicken | Scooter driver | Uncredited |
| 2004 | City Limits | Agent Dario Lattanzi | |
| 2005 | Dalla parte giusta | Giorgio | |
| 2005 | Mother Nature | Lawyer Sacco | |
| 2007 | Seven Kilometers from Jerusalem | Alessandro Forte | |
| 2008 | Animanera | Inspector Masciandro | |
| 2008 | Scusa ma ti chiamo amore | Tony | |
| 2010 | Piazza giochi | Luciano | |
| 2011 | Nauta | Davide | |
| 2012 | La ricotta e il caffè | Domenico | Short film |
| 2015 | Le leggi del desiderio | Paolo Rubens | |
| 2019 | La mia seconda volta | Davide's father | |
| 2020 | Under the Riccione Sun | Lucio | |
| 2020 | Il cinema non si ferma | Voice-over | Docufilm |
| 2022 | Under the Amalfi Sun | Lucio | |
| 2024 | PAPmusic - Animation for Fashion | Giuseppe (voice) | Animated film |

=== Television ===
| Year | Title | Role(s) | Notes |
|---|---|---|---|
| 1971 | E le stelle stanno a guardare | 3-years-old child | Episode: "Episode 1" |
| 1982 | Inverno al mare | Pino Lauri | Television film |
| 1993 | Tre passi nel delitto: Villa Maltraversi | Walter Cavicchi | Television film |
| 1998 | Una donna per amico | Gianni | Episode: "Per un uomo è diverso" |
| 2001 | Incantesimo | Goffredo Favare | 8 episodes |
| 2002 | Don Matteo | Alberto Mei | Episode: "Bellissima" |
| 2002–2004 | CentoVetrine | Massimo Forti | Recurring role |
| 2003–2004 | Elisa di Rivombrosa | Ottavio Ranieri | 15 episodes |
| 2007 | Un dottore quasi perfetto | Alessandro Franchi | Television film |
| 2007 | La stella dei re | Balthasar | Television film |
| 2007–2010 | Donna Detective | Maurizio Farnese | 20 episodes |
| 2008 | Capri | Cosimo Rizzuto | 13 episodes |
| 2008 | Distretto di Polizia | Dr. Maffei | Episode: "Fino a prova contraria" |
| 2009 | Il mistero del lago | Fosco De Dominici | Television film |
| 2009 | Il cacciatore di uomini | Robert Hill | Television film |
| 2009 | Un amore di strega | Vlad | Television film |
| 2009 | Negli occhi dell'assassino | Giona Di Falco | Television film |
| 2010 | Virus Attack | Siderno (voice) | Animated series |
| 2011 | Non smettere di sognare | Walter Vallieri | 6 episodes |
| 2012–2018 | Le tre rose di Eva | Ruggero Camerano | 50 episodes |
| 2013 | Rex | Paolo Miano | 4 episodes |
| 2014 | Un angelo all'inferno | Ivan | Television film |
| 2016 | Braccialetti rossi | Leone Campo | 5 episodes |
| 2016–2017 | Un posto al sole | Matteo Serra | 10 episodes |
| 2022 | Tre sorelle | Father | Television film |
| 2024 | Mameli - Il ragazzo che sognò l'Italia | Father Sinaldi | TV miniseries |
| 2024 | FBI: International | Banchero | TV series, 1 episode |
| 2025 | Mina Settembre | Arnaldo | TV series, 3rd season |

=== Dubbing ===
==== Films (Animation, Italian dub) ====
| Year | Title | Role(s) | Ref |
|---|---|---|---|
| 1992 | FernGully: The Last Rainforest | Zak | |
| 1996 | Heavy Metal | Harry Canyon (1996 redub) | |
| 2000 | Casper's Haunted Christmas | Kibosh | |
| 2001 | Osmosis Jones | Drix | |
| 2002 | Corto Maltese: Secret Court of the Arcanes | Corto Maltese | |
| 2002 | Treasure Planet | Scroop | |
| 2004 | Team America: World Police | Samuel L. Jackson | |
| 2004 | Home on the Range | Rico | |
| 2004 | Bionicle 2: Legends of Metru Nui | Lhikan | |
| 2006 | Over the Hedge | RJ | |
| 2006 | Asterix and the Vikings | Doublehelix | |
| 2007 | Happily N'Ever After | The Prince | |
| 2007 | Surf's Up | Tank "The Shredder" Evans | |
| 2009 | Planet 51 | Charles T. "Chuck" Baker | |
| 2009 | Bionicle: The Legend Reborn | Mata Nui | |
| 2009 | The Princess and the Frog | Dr. Facilier | |
| 2009 | A Christmas Carol | Ghost of Christmas Present | |
| 2010 | Dante's Inferno: An Animated Epic | Dante | |
| 2013 | Dragon Ball Z: Battle of Gods | Shenron | |
| 2014 | The Lego Movie | Lando Calrissian | |
| 2022 | DC League of Super-Pets | Bruce Wayne / Batman | |
| 2022 | Fireheart | Shawn Nolan | |

==== Films (Live action, Italian dub) ====
| Year | Title | Role(s) | Original actor | Ref |
|---|---|---|---|---|
| 1984 | Bachelor Party | Rick Gassko | Tom Hanks | |
| 1984 | Friday the 13th: The Final Chapter | Jimmy Mortimer | Crispin Glover | |
| 1985 | Runaway Train | Buck McGeehy | Eric Roberts | |
| 1987 | No Way Out | Tom Farrell | Kevin Costner | |
| 1987 | Full Metal Jacket | Sergeant "Animal Mother" | Adam Baldwin | |
| 1987 | Wall Street | Roger Barnes | James Spader | |
| 1988 | The Deceivers | William Savage | Pierce Brosnan | |
| 1988 | Talk Radio | Dan | Alec Baldwin | |
| 1988 | Stormy Monday | Brendan | Sean Bean | |
| 1988 | Kansas | Doyle Kennedy | Matt Dillon | |
| 1988 | Young Guns | Jose Chavez y Chavez | Lou Diamond Phillips | |
| 1989 | Next of Kin | Joey Rosselini | Adam Baldwin | |
| 1989 | The Karate Kid Part III | Terry Silver | Thomas Ian Griffith | |
| 1990 | Blood Oath | Lieutenant Corbett | Russell Crowe | |
| 1990 | Predator 2 | Adam Garber | Adam Baldwin | |
| 1990 | The Ages of Lulu | Pablo | Óscar Ladoire | |
| 1990 | Lionheart | Lyon "Lionheart" Gaultier | Jean-Claude Van Damme | |
| 1990 | Double Impact | Alex Wagner / Chad Wagner | Jean-Claude Van Damme | |
| 1990 | Fire Birds | Jake Preston | Nicolas Cage | |
| 1990 | Hardware | Moses "Hard Mo" Baxter | Dylan McDermott | |
| 1990 | Midnight Ride | Lawson | Michael Dudikoff | |
| 1990 | Darkman | Dr. Peyton Westlake / Darkman | Liam Neeson | |
| 1990 | Air America | Gene Ryack | Mel Gibson | |
| 1991 | Robin Hood: Prince of Thieves | Robin Hood | Kevin Costner | |
| 1991 | The Wicked | Gustav | Julian Sands | |
| 1992 | White Sands | Greg Meeker | Samuel L. Jackson | |
| 1992 | Raising Cain | Jack Dante | Steven Bauer | |
| 1992 | Indochine | Jean-Baptiste Le Guen | Vincent Perez | |
| 1993 | Short Cuts | Stormy Weathers | Peter Gallagher | |
| 1993 | Mother's Boys | Robert Madigan | Peter Gallagher | |
| 1993 | The Piano | Alisdair Stewart | Sam Neill | |
| 1993 | The Shawshank Redemption | Tommy Williams | Gil Bellows | |
| 1994 | Sirens | Reverend Anthony Campion | Hugh Grant | |
| 1994 | Four Weddings and a Funeral | Charles | Hugh Grant | |
| 1994 | Pulp Fiction | Jules Winnfield | Samuel L. Jackson | |
| 1994 | The House of the Spirits | Pedro Tercero | Antonio Banderas | |
| 1994 | The River Wild | Wade | Kevin Bacon | |
| 1994 | The Getaway | Carter "Doc" McCoy | Alec Baldwin | |
| 1994 | Nobody's Fool | Carl Roebuck | Bruce Willis | |
| 1994 | Miracle on 34th Street | Bryan Bedford | Dylan McDermott | |
| 1994 | The Hudsucker Proxy | Smitty | Bruce Campbell | |
| 1994 | The Crow | Eric Draven / The Crow | Brandon Lee | |
| 1994 | Disclosure | Mark Lewyn | Dennis Miller | |
| 1995 | GoldenEye | James Bond | Pierce Brosnan | |
| 1995 | Die Hard with a Vengeance | Zeus Carver | Samuel L. Jackson | |
| 1995 | Murder in the First | Henri Young | Kevin Bacon | |
| 1995 | Home for the Holidays | Leo Fish | Dylan McDermott | |
| 1995 | Soldier Boyz | Major Howard Toliver | Michael Dudikoff | |
| 1995 | Money Train | Charlie Robinson | Woody Harrelson | |
| 1995 | Never Talk to Strangers | Tony Ramirez | Antonio Banderas | |
| 1995 | Rob Roy | Rob Roy MacGregor | Liam Neeson | |
| 1995 | Congo | Charlie Travis | Bruce Campbell | |
| 1995 | French Kiss | Luc Teyssier | Kevin Kline | |
| 1996 | The Mirror Has Two Faces | Alex Rogers | Pierce Brosnan | |
| 1996 | Sleepers | Lorenzo "Shakes" Carcaterra | Jason Patric | |
| 1996 | The Juror | Vincent "The Teacher" / Mark Cordell | Alec Baldwin | |
| 1996 | A Time to Kill | Jake Brigance | Matthew McConaughey | |
| 1996 | The Fan | Juan Primo | Benicio del Toro | |
| 1996 | Heaven's Prisoners | Bubba Rocque | Eric Roberts | |
| 1996 | Beautiful Girls | Tommy "Birdman" Rowland | Matt Dillon | |
| 1996 | Daylight | Roy Nord | Viggo Mortensen | |
| 1996 | Moll Flanders | Jonathan | John Lynch | |
| 1997 | L.A. Confidential | Wendell "Bud" White | Russell Crowe | |
| 1997 | Jackie Brown | Ordell Robbie | Samuel L. Jackson | |
| 1997 | Dante's Peak | Harry Dalton | Pierce Brosnan | |
| 1997 | Tomorrow Never Dies | James Bond | Pierce Brosnan | |
| 1997 | The Devil's Advocate | Kevin Lomax | Keanu Reeves | |
| 1997 | Cop Land | Gary Figgis | Ray Liotta | |
| 1997 | Anna Karenina | Count Aleksei Kirillovich Vronskiy | Sean Bean | |
| 1998 | Sphere | Dr. Harry Adams | Samuel L. Jackson | |
| 1998 | Knock Off | Marcus Ray | Jean-Claude Van Damme | |
| 1998 | Judas Kiss | Lizard Browning | Gil Bellows | |
| 1998 | Just the Ticket | Gary Starke | Andy García | |
| 1998 | A Perfect Murder | David Shaw | Viggo Mortensen | |
| 1998 | Your Friends & Neighbors | Cary | Jason Patric | |
| 1999 | Stir of Echoes | Tom Witzky | Kevin Bacon | |
| 1999 | The Matrix | Neo | Keanu Reeves | |
| 1999 | The Confession | Roy Bleakie | Alec Baldwin | |
| 1999 | Onegin | Yevgeny Onegin | Ralph Fiennes | |
| 1999 | The Thomas Crown Affair | Thomas Crown | Pierce Brosnan | |
| 1999 | The World Is Not Enough | James Bond | Pierce Brosnan | |
| 1999 | Grey Owl | Archibald "Grey Owl" Belaney | Pierce Brosnan | |
| 1999 | Inferno | Eddie Lomax | Jean-Claude Van Damme | |
| 1999 | Restraining Order | Robert Woodfield | Eric Roberts | |
| 1999 | The 13th Warrior | Ahmad ibn Fadlan | Antonio Banderas | |
| 1999 | Play It to the Bone | Cesar Dominguez | Antonio Banderas | |
| 1999 | Deep Blue Sea | Russell Franklin | Samuel L. Jackson | |
| 1999 | Any Given Sunday | Jack "Cap" Rooney | Dennis Quaid | |
| 1999 | Forever Mine | Mark Brice | Ray Liotta | |
| 1999 | A Walk on the Moon | Marty Kantrowitz | Liev Schreiber | |
| 2000 | Unbreakable | Elijah Price / Mr. Glass | Samuel L. Jackson | |
| 2000 | Dracula 2000 | Dracula / Judas Iscariot | Gerard Butler | |
| 2000 | My Dog Skip | Jack Morris | Kevin Bacon | |
| 2000 | Gladiator | Maximus Decimus Meridius | Russell Crowe | |
| 2000 | Proof of Life | Terry Thorne | Russell Crowe | |
| 2000 | Wonder Boys | Terry Crabtree | Robert Downey Jr. | |
| 2000 | The Watcher | David Allen Griffin | Keanu Reeves | |
| 2000 | The Replacements | Shane Falco | Keanu Reeves | |
| 2000 | The Gift | Donnie Barksdale | Keanu Reeves | |
| 2000 | Me, Myself & Irene | Dickie Thurman | Daniel Greene | |
| 2000 | Jill Rips | Matt Sorenson | Dolph Lundgren | |
| 2000 | The Million Dollar Hotel | Geronimo | Jimmy Smits | |
| 2000 | Tripfall | Eddie | Eric Roberts | |
| 2000 | Mercy Streets | Rome | Eric Roberts | |
| 2000 | Traffic | Carlos Ayala | Steven Bauer | |
| 2000 | Forever Lulu | Ben Clifton | Patrick Swayze | |
| 2000 | XChange | Toffler | Kim Coates | |
| 2001 | The Tailor of Panama | Andrew "Andy" Osnard | Pierce Brosnan | |
| 2001 | The Body | Matt Gutierrez | Antonio Banderas | |
| 2001 | Druids | Vercingetorix | Christopher Lambert | |
| 2001 | Sweet November | Nelson Moss | Keanu Reeves | |
| 2001 | Hardball | Conor O'Neill | Keanu Reeves | |
| 2001 | The 51st State | Elmo McElroy | Samuel L. Jackson | |
| 2001 | Bridget Jones's Diary | Daniel Cleaver | Hugh Grant | |
| 2001 | Hidden Agenda | Agent Jason Price | Dolph Lundgren | |
| 2001 | Heartbreakers | Dean Cumanno | Ray Liotta | |
| 2001 | Ticker | Lieutenant Frank Glass | Steven Seagal | |
| 2001 | Don't Say a Word | Patrick Koster | Sean Bean | |
| 2001 | Human Nature | Nathan Bronfman | Tim Robbins | |
| 2001 | Rock Star | Kirk Cuddy | Dominic West | |
| 2002 | Evelyn | Desmond Doyle | Pierce Brosnan | |
| 2002 | Die Another Day | James Bond | Pierce Brosnan | |
| 2002 | About a Boy | Will Freeman | Hugh Grant | |
| 2002 | Unconditional Love | Dirk Simpson | Rupert Everett | |
| 2002 | Chicago | Billy Flynn | Richard Gere | |
| 2003 | Basic | Nathan West | Samuel L. Jackson | |
| 2003 | Imagining Argentina | Carlos Rueda | Antonio Banderas | |
| 2003 | Out for a Kill | Professor Robert Burns | Steven Seagal | |
| 2003 | Belly of the Beast | Jake Hopper | Steven Seagal | |
| 2003 | Lara Croft: Tomb Raider – The Cradle of Life | Terry Sheridan | Gerard Butler | |
| 2003 | Mystic River | Sean Devine | Kevin Bacon | |
| 2003 | Master and Commander: The Far Side of the World | Jack Aubrey | Russell Crowe | |
| 2003 | The Matrix Reloaded | Neo | Keanu Reeves | |
| 2003 | The Matrix Revolutions | Neo | Keanu Reeves | |
| 2003 | Perfect Strangers | The Man | Sam Neill | |
| 2003 | Open Range | Charley Waite / Charles Travis Postelwaite | Kevin Costner | |
| 2003 | The Cooler | Sheldon "Shelly" Kaplow | Alec Baldwin | |
| 2003 | Wonderland | Ron Launius | Josh Lucas | |
| 2003 | 11:14 | Frank | Patrick Swayze | |
| 2003 | Carmen | José | Leonardo Sbaraglia | |
| 2004 | Laws of Attraction | Daniel Rafferty | Pierce Brosnan | |
| 2004 | After the Sunset | Max Burdett | Pierce Brosnan | |
| 2004 | The Matador | Julian Noble | Pierce Brosnan | |
| 2004 | Undertow | Deel Munn | Josh Lucas | |
| 2004 | The Day After Tomorrow | Jack Hall | Dennis Quaid | |
| 2004 | Flight of the Phoenix | Franklin "Frank" Towns | Dennis Quaid | |
| 2004 | Bridget Jones: The Edge of Reason | Daniel Cleaver | Hugh Grant | |
| 2004 | In My Country | Langston Whitfield | Samuel L. Jackson | |
| 2004 | Romasanta | Manuel Romasanta | Julian Sands | |
| 2004 | Touch of Pink | Cary Grant’s ghost | Kyle MacLachlan | |
| 2005 | Dreamer | Everett Palmer | David Morse | |
| 2005 | Constantine | John Constantine | Keanu Reeves | |
| 2005 | Cinderella Man | James J. Braddock | Russell Crowe | |
| 2005 | The Mechanik | Nikolai "Nick" Cherenko | Dolph Lundgren | |
| 2005 | London | Bateman | Jason Statham | |
| 2006 | A Good Year | Max Skinner | Russell Crowe | |
| 2006 | Them | Lucas | Michaël Cohen | |
| 2006 | A Scanner Darkly | Bob Arctor | Keanu Reeves | |
| 2006 | The Lake House | Alex Wyler | Keanu Reeves | |
| 2006 | The Hard Corps | Phillippe Sauvage | Jean-Claude Van Damme | |
| 2006 | Poseidon | Dylan Johns | Josh Lucas | |
| 2006 | Home of the Brave | Dr. William "Will" Marsh | Samuel L. Jackson | |
| 2006 | Fur | Lionel Sweeney | Robert Downey Jr. | |
| 2007 | 3:10 to Yuma | Ben Wade | Russell Crowe | |
| 2007 | Cleaner | Thomas "Tom" Cutler | Samuel L. Jackson | |
| 2007 | Butterfly on a Wheel | Tom Ryan | Pierce Brosnan | |
| 2007 | The Hitcher | John Ryder / The Hitchhiker | Sean Bean | |
| 2007 | Death Sentence | Nick Hume | Kevin Bacon | |
| 2007 | Rails & Ties | Tom Stark | Kevin Bacon | |
| 2007 | Hannibal Rising | Inspector Pascal Popil | Dominic West | |
| 2007 | Music and Lyrics | Alex Fletcher | Hugh Grant | |
| 2007 | Live Free or Die Hard | Thomas Gabriel | Timothy Olyphant | |
| 2008 | Jumper | Roland Cox | Samuel L. Jackson | |
| 2008 | Vantage Point | Thomas Barnes | Dennis Quaid | |
| 2008 | The Express: The Ernie Davis Story | Ben Schwartzwalder | Dennis Quaid | |
| 2008 | Street Kings | Detective Tom Ludlow | Keanu Reeves | |
| 2008 | The Day the Earth Stood Still | Klaatu | Keanu Reeves | |
| 2008 | My Mom's New Boyfriend | Tommy Lucero / Tomas Martinez | Antonio Banderas | |
| 2008 | The Other Man | Ralph | Antonio Banderas | |
| 2008 | Body of Lies | Ed Hoffman | Russell Crowe | |
| 2008 | Nim's Island | Jack Rusoe / Alex Rover | Gerard Butler | |
| 2008 | Prom Night | Detective Winn | Idris Elba | |
| 2008 | 21 | Cole Williams | Laurence Fishburne | |
| 2008 | Meet the Spartans | Captain Artemis | Kevin Sorbo | |
| 2009 | The Greatest | Allen Brewer | Pierce Brosnan | |
| 2009 | Mother and Child | Paul | Samuel L. Jackson | |
| 2009 | Did You Hear About the Morgans? | Paul Morgan | Hugh Grant | |
| 2009 | The Private Lives of Pippa Lee | Chris Nadeau | Keanu Reeves | |
| 2009 | The Line | Javier Salazar | Andy García | |
| 2009 | Lilly the Witch: The Dragon and the Magic Book | Jerome | Ingo Naujoks | |
| 2009 | Sherlock Holmes | Sherlock Holmes | Robert Downey Jr. | |
| 2009 | Law Abiding Citizen | Clyde Shelton | Gerard Butler | |
| 2009 | Horsemen | Aidan Breslin | Dennis Quaid | |
| 2009 | Thick as Thieves | Gabriel Martin | Antonio Banderas | |
| 2009 | The New Daughter | John James | Kevin Costner | |
| 2009 | Holy Water | Tom Gaffney | John Lynch | |
| 2010 | My One and Only | Danny Devereaux (2010 redub) | Kevin Bacon | |
| 2010 | Percy Jackson & the Olympians: The Lightning Thief | Chiron | Pierce Brosnan | |
| 2010 | The Ghost Writer | Adam Lang | Pierce Brosnan | |
| 2010 | The Company Men | Jack Dolan | Kevin Costner | |
| 2010 | Tooth Fairy | Derek Thompson | Dwayne Johnson | |
| 2010 | The Next Three Days | John Brennan | Russell Crowe | |
| 2010 | The Expendables | Gunner Jensen | Dolph Lundgren | |
| 2010 | Due Date | Peter Highman | Robert Downey Jr. | |
| 2010 | Resident Evil: Afterlife | Luther West | Boris Kodjoe | |
| 2010 | Burlesque | Vincent "Vince" Scali | Peter Gallagher | |
| 2010 | The Losers | Clay | Jeffrey Dean Morgan | |
| 2010 | Cemetery Junction | Mr. Kendrick | Ralph Fiennes | |
| 2011 | Arena | Logan | Samuel L. Jackson | |
| 2011 | X-Men: First Class | Sebastian Shaw | Kevin Bacon | |
| 2011 | Elephant White | Jimmy | Kevin Bacon | |
| 2011 | Someday This Pain Will Be Useful to You | Paul Sveck | Peter Gallagher | |
| 2011 | Coriolanus | Tullus Aufidius | Gerard Butler | |
| 2011 | Machine Gun Preacher | Sam Childers | Gerard Butler | |
| 2011 | Texas Killing Fields | Brian Heigh | Jeffrey Dean Morgan | |
| 2011 | Sherlock Holmes: A Game of Shadows | Sherlock Holmes | Robert Downey Jr. | |
| 2011 | Black Gold | Emir Nesib | Antonio Banderas | |
| 2011 | I Don't Know How She Does It | Jack Abelhammer | Pierce Brosnan | |
| 2011 | Love Is All You Need | Philip | Pierce Brosnan | |
| 2011 | Fast Five | Luke Hobbs | Dwayne Johnson | |
| 2011 | The Three Musketeers | Athos | Matthew Macfadyen | |
| 2012 | Les Misérables | Javert | Russell Crowe | |
| 2012 | The Man with the Iron Fists | Jack Knife | Russell Crowe | |
| 2012 | Playing for Keeps | George | Gerard Butler | |
| 2012 | Cloud Atlas | Various roles | Hugh Grant | |
| 2012 | Six Bullets | Samson Gaul | Jean-Claude Van Damme | |
| 2012 | The Expendables 2 | Gunner Jensen | Dolph Lundgren | |
| 2012 | Resident Evil: Retribution | Luther West | Boris Kodjoe | |
| 2013 | Man of Tai Chi | Donaka Mark | Keanu Reeves | |
| 2013 | The World's End | Guy Shepherd | Pierce Brosnan | |
| 2013 | The Love Punch | Richard Jones | Pierce Brosnan | |
| 2013 | The Last Stand | Gabriel Cortez | Eduardo Noriega | |
| 2013 | Olympus Has Fallen | Mike Banning | Gerard Butler | |
| 2013 | Fast & Furious 6 | Luke Hobbs | Dwayne Johnson | |
| 2013 | Empire State | James Ransome | Dwayne Johnson | |
| 2013 | Man of Steel | Jor-El | Russell Crowe | |
| 2013 | Movie 43 | Charlie Wessler | Dennis Quaid | |
| 2013 | The Hobbit: The Desolation of Smaug | Smaug | Benedict Cumberbatch | |
| 2013 | The Scorpion King 3: Battle for Redemption | Mathayus | Victor Webster | |
| 2014 | Jack Ryan: Shadow Recruit | Thomas Harper | Kevin Costner | |
| 2014 | The Judge | Henry "Hank" Palmer | Robert Downey Jr. | |
| 2014 | A Long Way Down | Martin Sharp | Pierce Brosnan | |
| 2014 | The November Man | Peter Devereaux | Pierce Brosnan | |
| 2014 | Some Kind of Beautiful | Richard Haig | Pierce Brosnan | |
| 2014 | Survivor | Nash | Pierce Brosnan | |
| 2014 | The Expendables 3 | Gunner Jensen | Dolph Lundgren | |
| 2014 | The Rewrite | Keith Michaels | Hugh Grant | |
| 2014 | Winter's Tale | Pearly Soames / Demon | Russell Crowe | |
| 2014 | The Water Diviner | Joshua Connor | Russell Crowe | |
| 2014 | The Hobbit: The Battle of the Five Armies | Smaug | Benedict Cumberbatch | |
| 2014 | John Wick | John Wick | Keanu Reeves | |
| 2014 | Kingsman: The Secret Service | Richmond Valentine | Samuel L. Jackson | |
| 2014 | Big Game | President William Alan Moore | Samuel L. Jackson | |
| 2015 | Fathers and Daughters | Jake Davis | Russell Crowe | |
| 2015 | No Escape | Hammond | Pierce Brosnan | |
| 2015 | Pound of Flesh | Deacon Lyle | Jean-Claude Van Damme | |
| 2015 | The Man from U.N.C.L.E. | Alexander Waverly | Hugh Grant | |
| 2015 | The Hateful Eight | Major Marquis Warren | Samuel L. Jackson | |
| 2015 | The SpongeBob Movie: Sponge Out of Water | Burger Beard | Antonio Banderas | |
| 2016 | Miss Peregrine's Home for Peculiar Children | Mr. Barron | Samuel L. Jackson | |
| 2016 | I.T. | Mike Regan | Pierce Brosnan | |
| 2016 | The Nice Guys | Jackson Healy | Russell Crowe | |
| 2016 | London Has Fallen | Mike Banning | Gerard Butler | |
| 2016 | Gods of Egypt | Set | Gerard Butler | |
| 2016 | A Family Man | Dane Jensen | Gerard Butler | |
| 2016 | Exposed | Detective Scott Galban | Keanu Reeves | |
| 2016 | The Bad Batch | The Dream | Keanu Reeves | |
| 2016 | The Whole Truth | Richard Ramsay | Keanu Reeves | |
| 2016 | The Correspondence | Ed Phoerum | Jeremy Irons | |
| 2016 | The Darkness | Peter Taylor | Kevin Bacon | |
| 2017 | The Hitman's Bodyguard | Darius Kincaid | Samuel L. Jackson | |
| 2017 | The Music of Silence | The Maestro | Antonio Banderas | |
| 2017 | Geostorm | Jake Lawson | Gerard Butler | |
| 2017 | Paddington 2 | Phoenix Buchanan | Hugh Grant | |
| 2017 | The Broken Key | Francis Rosebud | Christopher Lambert | |
| 2017 | The Mummy | Dr. Henry Jekyll / Mr. Edward "Eddie" Hyde | Russell Crowe | |
| 2017 | John Wick: Chapter 2 | John Wick | Keanu Reeves | |
| 2017 | Molly's Game | Charlie Jaffey | Idris Elba | |
| 2018 | Mamma Mia! Here We Go Again | Sam Carmichael | Pierce Brosnan | |
| 2018 | Life Itself | Samuel L. Jackson | Samuel L. Jackson | |
| 2018 | Den of Thieves | Nick "Big Nick" O'Brien | Gerard Butler | |
| 2018 | Hunter Killer | Joe Glass | Gerard Butler | |
| 2018 | Boy Erased | Marshall Eamons | Russell Crowe | |
| 2018 | Destination Wedding | Frank | Keanu Reeves | |
| 2019 | Glass | Elijah Price / Mr. Glass | Samuel L. Jackson | |
| 2019 | Unicorn Store | The Salesman | Samuel L. Jackson | |
| 2019 | John Wick: Chapter 3 – Parabellum | John Wick | Keanu Reeves | |
| 2019 | The Lion King | Mufasa | James Earl Jones | |
| 2019 | Angel Has Fallen | Mike Banning | Gerard Butler | |
| 2019 | The Gentlemen | Fletcher | Hugh Grant | |
| 2019 | Unplanned | Doug | Brooks Ryan | |
| 2019 | Doom: Annihilation | Stanga | Dominic Mafham | |
| 2020 | Eurovision Song Contest: The Story of Fire Saga | Erick Erickssong | Pierce Brosnan | |
| 2020 | The SpongeBob Movie: Sponge on the Run | Sage | Keanu Reeves | |
| 2020 | Greenland | John Garrity | Gerard Butler | |
| 2020 | Unhinged | Tom Cooper | Russell Crowe | |
| 2020 | Creators: The Past | Lord Kal | Bruce Payne | |
| 2021 | Spiral | Marcus Banks | Samuel L. Jackson | |
| 2021 | Hitman's Wife's Bodyguard | Darius Kincaid | Samuel L. Jackson | |
| 2021 | Cinderella | King Rowan | Pierce Brosnan | |
| 2021 | The Matrix Resurrections | Neo / Thomas Anderson | Keanu Reeves | |
| 2021 | The Suicide Squad | Nanaue / King Shark | Sylvester Stallone | |
| 2022 | Glass Onion: A Knives Out Mystery | Phillip | Hugh Grant | |
| 2022 | Thor: Love and Thunder | Zeus | Russell Crowe | |
| 2022 | The Greatest Beer Run Ever | Arthur Coates | Russell Crowe | |
| 2022 | Black Adam | Kent Nelson / Doctor Fate | Pierce Brosnan | |
| 2023 | John Wick: Chapter 4 | John Wick | Keanu Reeves | |
| 2023 | The Kill Room | Gordon | Samuel L. Jackson | |
| 2023 | The Pope's Exorcist | Gabriele Amorth | Russell Crowe | |
| 2023 | Dungeons & Dragons: Honor Among Thieves | Forge Fitzwilliam | Hugh Grant | |
| 2023 | Wonka | Lofty | Hugh Grant | |
| 2023 | Plane | Brodie Torrance | Gerard Butler | |
| 2023 | Kandahar | Tom Harris | Gerard Butler | |
| 2023 | Expend4bles | Gunner Jensen | Dolph Lundgren | |
| 2024 | Land of Bad | Captain Eddie Grimm "Reaper" | Russell Crowe | |
| 2024 | The Exorcism | Anthony Miller | Russell Crowe | |
| 2024 | Argylle | Alfie | Samuel L. Jackson | |

==== Television (Animation, Italian dub) ====
| Year | Title | Role(s) | Notes | Ref |
|---|---|---|---|---|
| 1980 | King Arthur | King Arthur | Main role | |
| 1999 | Excel Saga | Il Palazzo | Main cast | |
| 1999–2003 | Bob the Builder | Bob | 1st voice | |
| 2003 | Corto Maltese | Corto Maltese | Main cast | |
| 2004 | Transformers: Energon | Rodimus Convoy | TV series | |
| 2010 | Firebreather | Agent "Blitz" Barnes | TV film | |
| 2012–2017 | Teenage Mutant Ninja Turtles | Shredder | Main role | |
| 2024 | Secret Level | Pilot | | |

==== Television (Live action, Italian dub) ====
| Year | Title | Role(s) | Notes | Original actor | Ref |
|---|---|---|---|---|---|
| 1993 | Love, Honor & Obey: The Last Mafia Marriage | Bill Bonanno | TV film | Eric Roberts | |
| 1995 | Night Watch | Mike Graham | TV film | Pierce Brosnan | |
| 1995–1999 | Highlander: The Series | Methos | Recurring role (seasons 3–6) | Peter Wingfield | |
| 1995–2009 | Law & Order | Reynaldo Curtis | 95 episodes | Benjamin Bratt | |
| 1998 | Blackjack | Jack Devlin | TV film | Dolph Lundgren | |
| 1999 | RKO 281 | Orson Welles | TV film | Liev Schreiber | |
| 2001 | Mindstorm | David Mendez | TV film | Eric Roberts | |
| 2003–2007 | The O.C. | Sandy Cohen | Main cast | Peter Gallagher | |
| 2004 | Stauffenberg | Claus von Stauffenberg | TV film | Sebastian Koch | |
| 2005 | Karol: A Man Who Became Pope | Karol Józef Wojtyła | TV miniseries | Piotr Adamczyk | |
| 2005–2007 | Rome | Titus Pullo | Main cast | Ray Stevenson | |
| 2005–2007 | Prison Break | Alexander Mahone | Recurring role (seasons 2–3) | William Fichtner | |
| 2007 | Pandemic | Mayor D'Alesandro | TV miniseries | Eric Roberts | |
| 2007 | Stargate Atlantis | Mike Branton | 1 episode | Matthew Del Negro | |
| 2007–2008 | Moonlight | Mick St. John | Main cast | Alex O'Loughlin | |
| 2015–2018 | Daredevil | Wilson Fisk / Kingpin | 27 episodes | Vincent D'Onofrio | |
| 2015–2019 | Ballers | Spencer Strasmore | Main cast | Dwayne Johnson | |
| 2021 | Hawkeye | Wilson Fisk / Kingpin | TV miniseries | Vincent D'Onofrio | |
| 2022 | The Last Days of Ptolemy Grey | Ptolemy Grey | TV miniseries | Samuel L. Jackson | |
| 2022 | Obi-Wan Kenobi | Darth Vader | TV miniseries | James Earl Jones | rowspan=2 |
| 2022 | Obi-Wan Kenobi | Anakin Skywalker | TV miniseries | Hayden Christensen | |
| 2024 | Echo | Wilson Fisk / Kingpin | TV miniseries | Vincent D'Onofrio | |

==== Video games (Italian dub) ====
| Year | Title | Role(s) | Ref |
|---|---|---|---|
| 2002 | Treasure Planet: Battle at Procyon | Scroop | |
| 2002 | Tom Clancy's Splinter Cell | Sam Fisher | |
| 2004 | Tom Clancy's Splinter Cell: Pandora Tomorrow | Sam Fisher | |
| 2005 | Tom Clancy's Splinter Cell: Chaos Theory | Sam Fisher | |
| 2005 | The Matrix: Path of Neo | Neo | |
| 2013 | Tom Clancy's Splinter Cell: Blacklist | Sam Fisher | |
| 2015 | Tom Clancy's Rainbow Six Siege | Sam Fisher | |
| 2017 | Tom Clancy's Ghost Recon Wildlands | Sam Fisher / El Sueño | |
| 2019 | Tom Clancy's Ghost Recon Breakpoint | Sam Fisher | |
| 2020 | Cyberpunk 2077 | Johnny Silverhand | |
