= Galust =

Galust is an Armenian given name. Notable people with the name include:

- Galust Aloyan (1864–1914), Armenian fedayi and one of the Armenian national liberation movement figures
- Calouste Gulbenkian (1869–1955), British Armenian businessman and philanthropist
- Galust Petrosyan (born 1981), Armenian football forward
- Galust Sahakyan (1949–2022), Armenian politician, MP and the former President of the National Assembly of Armenia
- Galust Trapizonyan, Abkhazian politician and former military commander

== See also ==
- Galstyan, surname derived from the name
