= Caselli =

Caselli is an Italian surname derived from Casello, a diminutive of the personal name Caso. Notable people with the surname include:

- Caterina Caselli (born 1946), Italian record producer, former actress and singer
- Chiara Caselli (born 1967), Italian Actress
- Cristoforo Caselli (c. 1460–1521), Italian artist, late-15th to early-16th century
- Giovanni Caselli (1815–1891), the inventor of the 'pantelegraph', the forerunner of the modern fax machine
- Hilda Caselli (1836–1901) Swedish educational reformer
- Patrizia Caselli (1960–2026), Italian actress
