= Dime Quién Soy: Mistress of War =

Historical drama television series

- Spanish: Dime quién soy
- Genre: Historical drama
- Created by: José Manuel Lorenzo; Eduard Cortés
- Based on: Tell Me Who I Am by Julia Navarro
- Written by: Piti Español
- Directed by: Eduard Cortés
- Starring: Irene Escolar; Oriol Pla; Pierre Kiwitt; Maria Pia Calzone; Will Keen
- Composer: Lucas Vidal
- Country of origin: Spain
- Original languages: Spanish (some dialogue in French, Russian, Italian, German and Polish)
- No. of seasons: 1
- No. of episodes: 9

Production
- Cinematography: Domi Parra
- Editor: David Omedes
- Production companies: Movistar+; DLO Producciones; Telemundo International Studios; Beta Film

Original release
- Network: Movistar+ (Spain); Peacock (United States)
- Release: December 4, 2020 – January 1, 2021

Dime Quién Soy: Mistress of War (Spanish: Dime quién soy) is a Spanish historical drama television limited series created by José Manuel Lorenzo and Eduard Cortés for Movistar+ and Peacock, based on the novel of the same name by Julia Navarro. It was directed by Eduard Cortés and written by Piti Español. The series, which spans the Spanish Civil War, World War II and the Cold War, follows Amelia Garayoa, a Madrilenian socialite who is plunged into the world of international espionage.

The series premiered on December 4, 2020 on Movistar+.

== Main cast ==
- Irene Escolar as Amelia Garayoa
- Oriol Pla as Pierre Comte
- Pierre Kiwitt as Max von Schumann
- Maria Pia Calzone as Carla Alessandrini
- Will Keen as Albert James
- Oleg Kricunova as Krisov
- Stefan Weinert as Ulrich Jürgens

== Plot ==
=== Episode 1 ===
In 1998, Albert James (Will Keen) sets out to find his mother, whom he never knew. In 1934, Amelia Garayoa (Irene Escolar), a daughter of the Madrid bourgeoisie, is torn between the demands of her environment and her progressive convictions. Pushed by her father, Juan Garayoa, an industrialist whose business is on the verge of bankruptcy, as one of his factories is closed in Berlin, she marries a rich heir, and they have a son. In the turmoil of the Second Spanish Republic, Amelia wants to get involved. She meets the French communist journalist Pierre Comte (Oriol Pla) and falls in love with him. Her life changes abruptly when she decides to leave her family behind and follow him to Argentina.

=== Episode 2 ===
Amelia and Pierre have been living in Buenos Aires for two years and are making friends with the Italian diva Carla Alessandrini (Maria Pia Calzone) and her friends. Thanks to these contacts, the couple opens a bookstore. Pierre secretly works for the Soviet secret service, which Amelia accidentally finds out. The couple are on the verge of separation, but for the sake of the matter, Pierre is summoned to Moscow and Amelia follows him again.

=== Episode 3 ===
In Moscow, Amelia and Pierre live with relatives and quickly feel the atmosphere of mistrust and Stalinist purges that prevails in the USSR under Stalin. Pierre is closely monitored for his connections to a former contact accused of treason, and finally arrested, detained and tortured by the political police. Helpless Amelia learns of the detention. Hosting an international congress gives her the opportunity to alert the British journalist Albert, whom she met in Madrid.

=== Episode 4 ===
In 1939, Amelia leaves Moscow accompanied by Albert, and returns to Madrid, where she meets her family again. Her husband does not forgive her for leaving the family, and she has difficulty seeing her 5-year-old son Javier again. Since the end of the Spanish Civil War, Spain has been living under the Franco dictatorship. Amelia has to pay a high price for trying to achieve the release of her father and her uncle who were imprisoned. The friendship with Albert opens up new possibilities for her.

=== Episode 5 ===
In Berlin, Amelia meets old acquaintances from Argentina again: the Italian singer Carla Alessandrini and the German military doctor Max von Schuman. Married to an attractive supporter of Hitler's government, he is opposed to Hitler, but loyal to his country. Amelia’s courage attracts the attention of the British military intelligence authorities, who recruit her as an intelligence agent despite Albert’s resistance. Plagued by guilt, the young woman must choose between her mission and a new love.

=== Episode 6 ===
Amelia’s mission takes her to Warsaw together with Max. The situation becomes more complicated when her new lover is transferred back to the Eastern Front (World War II). Alone in the Polish capital and spied on by the dreaded SS colonel Jürgens, Amelia joins a countrywoman who works as a nurse. They are included in a network of Polish resistance fighters who support the Jews in the Warsaw Ghetto. Amelia agrees to stand up for the threatened Jewish population as the repression of the Nazi occupiers increases.

=== Episode 7 ===
Amelia is being held under the supervision of Colonel Jürgens, and narrowly escapes her execution thanks to the intervention of Max, who has returned to Warsaw. The German soldier, now a family man, takes her to Carla Alessandrini in Italy before saying goodbye to her. The diva, supported by her husband and pianist, is active in the resistance. Amelia, who could not do anything about their arrest by the SS, resumes her service for the British. She takes the opportunity to settle with an enemy.

=== Episode 8 ===
In 1944, the British Secret Service sends Amelia to Athens to prepare for the capture of Wehrmachtsstabschef and logistic director Karl Kleist, called Albatros. Kleist learns of the young woman’s secret activities, but she can kidnap him with the help of the Greek resistance. Max, who is passing through, once again saves his beloved from the vigilance of the SS command. But Amelia expects a painful surprise when the Greek resistance recruits her for an armed operation.

=== Episode 9 ===
Seventeen years have passed and Amelia now lives in Berlin, together with Max and his son Friedrich. In 1961, the Berlin Wall is being built and soon embodies the division of the Cold War. Although Amelia works in the East German Foreign Ministry, she helps the philosophy teacher of her adopted son to migrate to the West. Amidst the tensions of history, she repeatedly meets faces who have shaped her own history, until the last reunion at the end of her life.

== Release ==
The first two episodes of the nine-part series premiered on Movistar+ on December 4, 2020. Episodes 3 to 5 were released on a weekly basis, and the last four episodes were released on January 1, 2021.

The first three episodes were previously screened at the 2020 San Sebastián International Film Festival on September 21, 2020.

In Latin America, the series aired on HBO Latin America and HBO Go from December 6, 2020. The series was acquired by DR in Denmark, Yle in Finland, NRK in Norway, RTP in Portugal, and Nova in Greece and Cyprus.

All nine episodes of the series were released March 8, 2021 in the United States on Peacock under the title Dime Quién Soy: Mistress of War in both Spanish and English.

The series aired on Arte TV from 07/04/2023 until 30/09/2023.
