= I peggiori =

- Theatrical Release Poster
- Directed by: Vincenzo Alfieri
- Screenplay by: Alessandro Aronadio; Giorgio Caruso; Raffaele Verzillo; Renato Sannio; Vincenzo Alfieri
- Story by: Vincenzo Alfieri
- Produced by: Federica Lucisano; Fulvio Lucisano
- Starring: Vincenzo Alfieri; Lino Guanciale; Antonella Attili; Tommaso Ragno; Sara Tancredi; Biagio Izzo
- Cinematography: Davide Manca
- Edited by: Vincenzo Alfieri
- Music by: Mirko Mancini
- Production company: Italian International Film
- Distributed by: Warner Bros. Pictures
- Release date: 18 May 2017
- Country: Italy
- Language: Italian

I peggiori is a 2017 Italian crime comedy film directed by Vincenzo Alfieri. It was released on 18 May 2017 by Warner Bros. Pictures.

== Cast ==
- Vincenzo Alfieri as Fabrizio
- Lino Guanciale as Massimo
- Antonella Attili as Eva Perrot
- Tommaso Ragno as Durim
- Miriam Candurro as Serena
- Daniele Favilli as Adan
- Sara Tancredi as Chiara
- Biagio Izzo as commissioner Natale Piervi
- Ernesto Mahieux as the landlord
- Francesco Paolantoni as Arturo
- Arcangelo Iannace as Giardini
- Roberto Pedicini as the Chief of Police
- Giorgio Musumeci as officer Torre
- Rufin Doh Zeyenouin as Joseph
- Teresa del Vecchio as principal Maffei
- Jin Liyu as Chun
- Francesco Pennasilico as Totò
- Marianna Robustelli as a journalist
- Giovanni Napolitano as Ruffen
- Maria Pia Calzone as Loredana
