= Grazia Daddario =

Italian actress (1932–2026)

- Born: 12 July 1932; Bari, Kingdom of Italy
- Died: 18 September 2026 (aged 94); Bari, Italy
- Occupation: Actress
- Years active: 1980–2022

Grazia Daddario (12 July 1932 – 18 September 2026) was an Italian actress.

== Life and career ==
Daddario was born in Bari on 12 July 1932, and made her theatre debut in 1980 alongside Nico Salatino.

She was cast in several films, including Mannaggia alla miseria by Lina Wertmüller, Buona giornata by Carlo Vanzina, and Ever Been to the Moon? by Paolo Genovese.

Daddario died in Bari on 18 September 2026, at the age of 94.

== Filmography ==
=== Film ===
- Odore di pioggia, directed by Nico Cirasola (1989)
- Soul Mate, directed by Sergio Rubini (2002)
- Non me lo dire, directed by Vito Cea (2012)
- Buona giornata, directed by Carlo Vanzina (2012)
- 100 metri dal paradiso, directed by Raffaele Verzillo, Fabio Verzillo (2012)
- Ever Been to the Moon?, directed by Paolo Genovese (2015)
- Tale of Tales, directed by Matteo Garrone (2015)
- Io che amo solo te, directed by Marco Ponti (2015)
- Non c'è più religione, directed by Luca Miniero (2016)
- La ragazza dei miei sogni, directed by Saverio Di Biagio (2017)
- Bar Giuseppe, directed by Giulio Base (2019)
- Madklubben, directed by Barbara Topsøe-Rothenborg (2020)
- Si vive una volta sola, directed by Carlo Verdone (2021)

=== Television ===
- Ama il tuo nemico, TV film directed by Damiano Damiani (1999)
- Mannaggia alla miseria, TV film directed by Lina Wertmüller (2009)
- Imma Tataranni: Deputy Prosecutor, directed by Francesco Amato - TV series (2 episodes)
