= Galstyan =

Galstyan is the surname of the following people:

- Aharon Galstyan (born 1970), Russian serial killer
- Arsen Galstyan (born 1989), American judoka
- Hambardzum Galstyan (1955–1994), Armenian politician and historian
- Haykaz Galstyan (born 1977), Armenian Greco-Roman wrestler
- Hovhannes Galstyan (born 1969), American film director
- Katya Galstyan (born 1993), Armenian cross-country skier
- Lilit Galstyan (born 1962), Armenian politician
- Marine Galstyan (born 1980), Armenian actress
- Martin Galstyan (born 1978), Armenian economist
- Poghos Galstyan (born 1961), American footballer
- Sargis Galstyan (born 1979), American actor and theatre director
- Slavik Galstyan (born 1996), Armenian sport wrestler
- Vaghinak Galstyan (born 1973), Armenian Greco-Roman wrestler
- Vilen Galstyan (1941–2021), American ballet dancer
- Vruir Galstyan (1924–1996), Armenian painter
