= Marco Ponti =

Italian film director

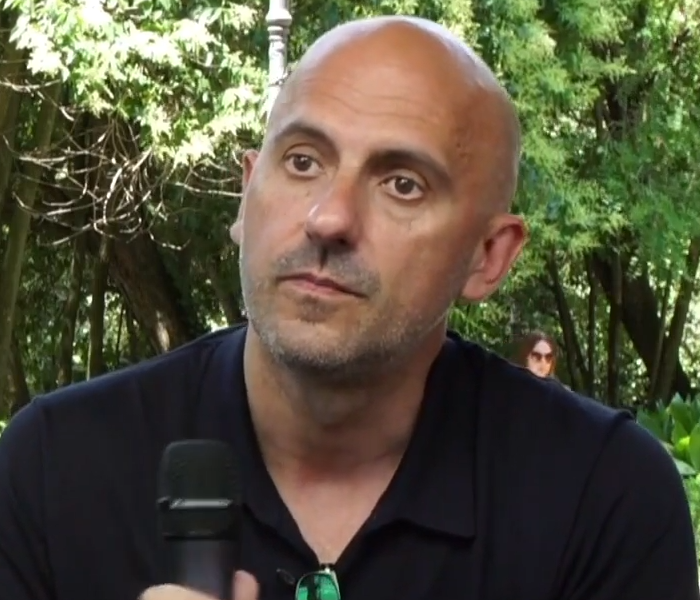
Marco Ponti

Marco Ponti (born 25 July 1967, in Avigliana, Piedmont) is an Italian film director.

== Life and career ==
He graduated in Modern Letters at the University of Turin and started working as a copywriter and as an assistant at the Faculty of Semiotics at the University of Turin. In 1995 he attended a scriptwriting course at the Scuola Holden in Turin; the following year he worked at the same place under the direction of Alessandro Baricco. In 1997 he attended a course for movie writers at the RAI Cinema Fiction School; in the same year he published a book dedicated to Quentin Tarantino.

After writing and/or directing some award-winning shorts (Benevenuto a San Salvario won the European Film Award in 1998; Amsterdam won an award for the best short feature and for the best actor at the Saint Vincent Festival in 1999), his debut feature film as a writer/director, Santa Maradona, in 2001 has been one of the smash hits of the year.

Starring Stefano Accorsi, Libero De Rienzo, Anita Caprioli e Mandala Tayde, the movie won two David di Donatello Awards (the award given by the Italian Academy of Motion Pictures) in 2002 for Best New Director and Best Supporting Actor, the Ciak d'Oro Award 2002 (given by the most influential movie magazine, Ciak) and, always in the same year, the Critics Award and Best Actor in the International Film Festival of Mar del Plata (Argentina).

The movie repeated his success in the DVD edition, reaching number 1 in the charts, and achieving cult status among Italian moviegoers (same happened for the soundtrack CD). Now, it is considered the movie that defined the post-gen X in Italy. Santa Maradona also became as well a popular movie in the film festivals circuit (from Toronto to Cuba, from Burkina Faso to Japan, from Berkeley to Sydney) and has been broadcast in several countries all around the five continents, and was chosen by Wim Wenders in 2003 as a case study in new filmmaking in the Berlin Film Festival.

In 2004, Marco Ponti wrote and directed his sophomore movie: A/R Andata + Ritorno (Round Trip) starring again Libero De Rienzo with Spanish beauty Vanessa Incontrada and the Indian star Kabir Bedi. The movie was in top ten charts both in theatres and DVD sells and was screened, between others, in the Mill Valley Film Festival (US), Honolulu, New Zealand and Australia.

In addition to his career as director, Marco Ponti co-wrote some movies: Se Fossi In Te di Giulio Manfredonia (Cattleya, 2001), L'uomo perfetto (Cattleya/Warner, 2005—nominee for Best Story in the Nastri D'Argento del Cinema Italiano 2006, the critics' award), Cardiofitness (2007). He also co-wrote and story edited the Italian adaptation of the play, film and TV series, The Odd Couple, in 2007.

Marco Ponti also worked in theatre since 1997; his last works are the translations/adaptations for the stage of Shakespeare's Romeo and Juliet (2005) and Ethan Coen's off-Broadway play Almost an Evening.

In 2007–2008 he teamed with the most famous Italian rockstars Lorenzo Jovanotti and Vasco Rossi.

With Jovanotti, he shot the documentary film La Luna di Giorno - Un ritratto in Movimento (The Moon by Day - A Portrait in Movement, edited in DVD and number one in the charts in January—March 2008), and the documentary Nessuna Ombra Intorno - Safari Live 2008.

With Vasco Rossi, the music video Il Mondo Che Vorrei.

In 2010 he wrote and directed a TV movie: Ti amo troppo per dirtelo, starring Jasmine Trinca, Carolina Crescentini and Francesco Scianna. The movie ranked number 1 the day of screening.

In 2012 he wrote and directed his third feature film, Passione Sinistra, starring Alessandro Preziosi, Valentina Lodovini, Vinicio Marchioni and the international supermodel Eva Riccobono.

In 2015 he co-wrote and directed the adaptation of the best-seller novel Io che amo solo te (Loving only you), written by Luca Bianchini. Shot in Polignano a Mare, in the Apulia region, starring Riccardo Scamarcio, Michele Placido, Maria Pia Calzone, Luciana Littizzetto and again Eva Riccobono. The movie reached number one in the first weekend of release.

In 2016 he co-wrote and directed the sequel of his previous movie, as well adapted by the best-seller novel La cena di Natale (The Christmas Dinner) by Luca Bianchini. The same cast was reunited, again in Polignano a Mare. The movie was released on 24 November 2016 and opened at #2 in the Italian charts.

In 2017 he wrote and directed his sixth feature film, Una Vita Spericolata (Reckless), starring Lorenzo Richelmy, Eugenio Franceschini, and 2018 Berlin Film Festival's Shooting Star Matilda De Angelis. The movie is scheduled to be released in spring 2018.

Both movies Io che amo solo te and La Cena di Natale were screened at the Italian television Rai Uno in December 2017 and went straight to #1 and #2 in the season television charts.

== Feature films ==
- Santa Maradona (2001)
- Roundtrip (2004)
- A Liberal Passion (2012)
- Io che amo solo te (2015)
- La cena di Natale (2016)
- Reckless (2018)

== Scripts ==
- Benvenuto in San Salvario, short (1998)
- Kissing Paul Newman, short (2001)
- Se fossi in te (2001)
- Playgirl, short (2002)
- L’uomo perfetto (2005)
- Cardiofitness (2007)

== Short features ==
- Amsterdam (1999)

== Various ==
- "Novecento" live broadcasting of Alessandro Baricco's play (2003)
- "TIM Mobile" commercial with Joaquin Cortez (2003)
- "Romeo & Juliet" play adaptation and translation (2005)
- "La strana coppia" TV show, Italia Uno (2007)
- "La Luna di giorno" documentary, (2008)
- "Nessuna Ombra Intorno - Safari Tour, (2008)
- "Colazione da Tiffany" Radio show, regular guest (2007–2010)
- Music video for Vasco Rossi (2008) by
- Music video for Elisa and Giuliano Sangiorgi (2009)
- "Almost an Evening" play adaptation and translation (2009)
- Music video for Emma Marrone (2016)
