= Fosca Innocenti =

Italian police procedural television series

- Italian: Fosca Innocwenti
- Genre: Drama; Police procedural
- Created by: Massimo Del Frate
- Directed by: Fabrizio Costa, first series; Giulio Manfredonia, second series
- Starring: Vanessa Incontrada; Francesco Arca; Desirée Noferini; Cecilia Dazzi; Giorgia Trasselli; Francesco Leone; Claudio Bigagli; Irene Ferri; Maria Malandrucco; Sergio Múñiz; Giovanni Scifoni; Caterina Signorini; Maria Chiara Centorami; Giulio Pampiglione; Sargis Galstyan
- Country of origin: Italy
- Original language: Italian
- No. of seasons: 2
- No. of episodes: 8

Production
- Running time: 50 min

Original release
- Network: Canale 5
- Release: 11 February 2022 – present

Fosca Innocenti is an Italian police procedural drama television series, broadcast on Canale 5 from 11 February 2022. It is based around deputy police chief Fosca Innocenti, commissioner of Arezzo, who works at a station made up almost exclusively of women investigators.

== Cast and characters ==
- Vanessa Incontrada as Fosca Innocenti
- Francesco Arca as Cosimo
- Desirée Noferini a Giulia De Falco
- Cecilia Dazzi as Rosa Lulli
- Giorgia Trasselli as Bice
- Francesco Leone as Pino Ricci
- Claudio Bigagli as Dr. Fontana
- Irene Ferri as Giuliana Perego
- Maria Malandrucco as Susy
- Sergio Múñiz as José Rodríguez
- Giovanni Scifoni as Lapo Fineschi
- Caterina Signorini as Rita Fiorucci
- Maria Chiara Centorami as Greta
- Giulio Pampiglione as don Paolo
- Sargis Galstyan as Interpreter
