= La Hermandad de la Sábana Santa =

La Hermandad de la Sábana Santa is a novel by Spanish author Julia Navarro, published in 2004.

== Plot ==
The novel recreates the investigation of a group of Italian policemen, led by the detective Marco Valoni and his right-hand woman, Doctor Sofia Galloni, to unravel the mystery of the successive mishaps in the Cathedral of Turin that have put the well-known Shroud of Turin at risk. At the same time, as a flashback, it narrates the origins of the Shroud, which the author locates in the city of Edessa in the time of King Abgaro.

== Sales ==
The book has reached 42 editions and has sold more than one million copies. It has been translated into fifteen languages.
