= Laura Chiatti =

Italian actress and singer

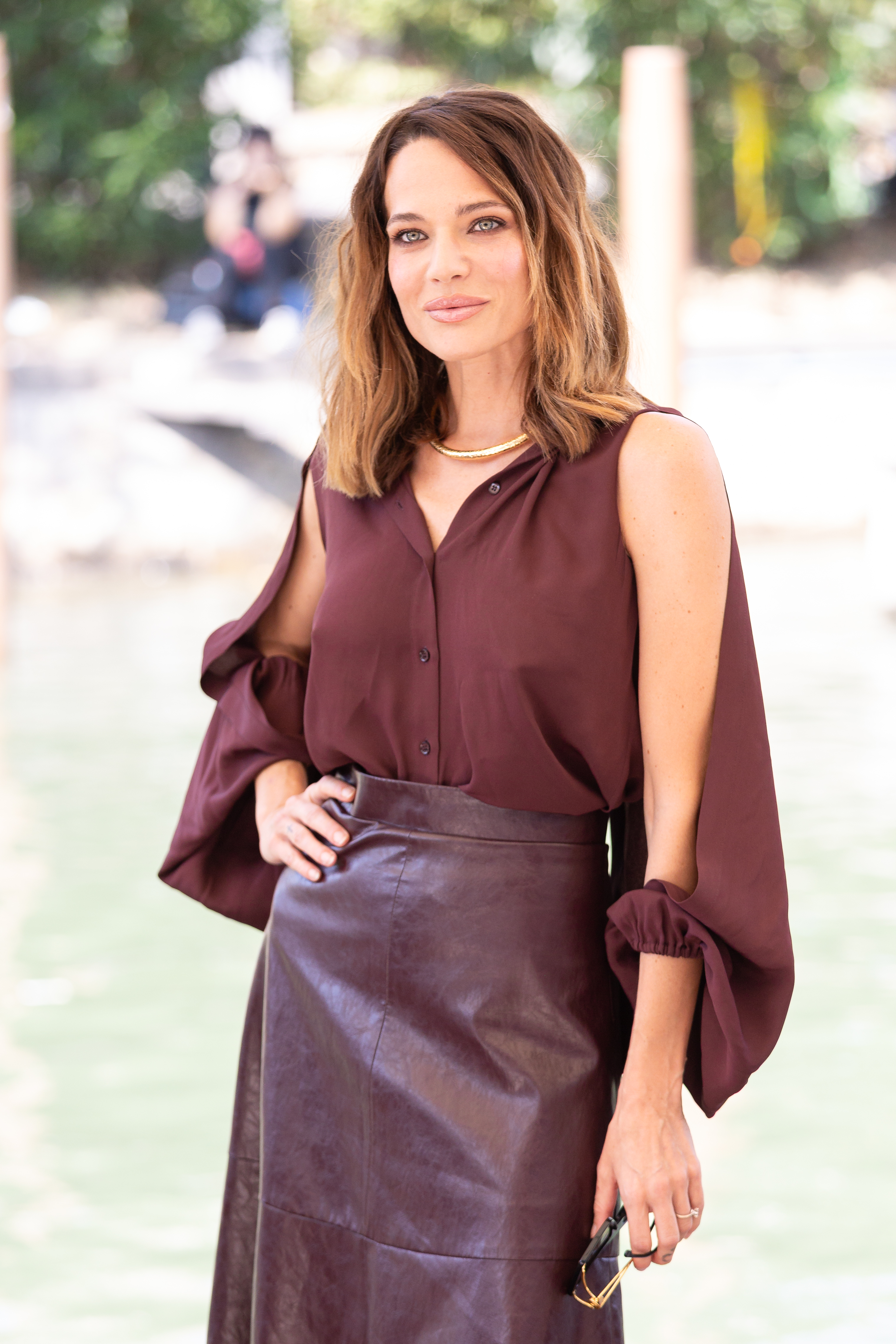
- Laura Chiatti at 81st Venice International Film Festival
- Born: 15 July 1982 (age 44); Castiglione del Lago, Perugia, Italy
- Occupation: Actress
- Years active: 1998–present
- Spouse: Marco Bocci (m. 2014)
- Children: 2
- Website: laurachiatti.it

Laura Chiatti (born 15 July 1982) is an Italian actress and singer. She is the leading lady in two successful films: Ho voglia di te, alongside Riccardo Scamarcio, and Paolo Sorrentino's third film The Family Friend. The latter was entered into the 2006 Cannes Film Festival. In 2010, she voiced Princess Rapunzel in the Italian version of the Disney-animated feature film Tangled.

She married fellow actor Marco Bocci in 2014. They have two sons: Enea (born 2015) and Pablo (born 2016).

== Filmography ==
=== Films ===
Year	Title	Role(s)	Notes
1998	Laura non c'è	Stefania	
1999	Vacanze sulla neve	Francesca	
1999	Pazzo d'amore	Roberta	
2000	Via del Corso	Monica	
2005	Never Again as Before	Giulia	
2005	Passo a due	Francesca	
2006	The Family Friend	Rosalba De Luca	
2006	Our Country	Elodie	
2007	Ho voglia di te	Ginevra Biro	
2008	The Early Bird Catches the Worm	Cristiana	
2009	Iago	Desdemona	
2009	The Case of Unfaithful Klara	Klara	
2009	The Friends at the Margherita Café	Marcella	
2009	Baarìa	Student	Cameo appearance
2010	Me, Them and Lara	Lara Vasilescu	
2010	Tangled	Rapunzel (voice)	Italian dub; voice role
2010	Somewhere	Sylvia	
2011	The Ages of Love	Micol	
2012	Gladiators of Rome	Lucilla (voice)	Italian dub; voice role
2012	Piazza Fontana: The Italian Conspiracy	Gemma Calabresi	
2012	The Worst Christmas of My Life	Benedetta Caccia	
2013	Il volto di un'altra	Bella	
2014	Pane e burlesque	Matilde	
2015	Io che amo solo te	Chiara	
2015	Il professor Cenerentolo	Morgana De Filippo	
2016	The Secret Life of Pets	Gidget (voice)	Italian dub; voice role
2016	La cena di Natale	Chiara	
2019	Un'avventura	Francesca	
2019	The Secret Life of Pets 2	Gidget (voice)	Italian dub; voice role
2020	The Players	Silvia	
2021	Addio al nubilato	Linda	
2022	Ero in guerra ma non lo sapevo	Elena	
2026	Quasi vera	Caterina	

=== Television ===
Year	Title	Role(s)	Notes
1999–2000	Un posto al sole	Giorgia Balestra	3 episodes
2001	Compagni di scuola	Valeria Filangeri	Main role
2002	Padri	Anna	Television movie
2002	Carabinieri	Teresa Guglielmi	Episode: "Cortocircuito"
2003	Arrivano i Rossi	Laura Rossi	Main role
2004	Incantesimo	Stella Rinaldo	Recurring role (season 7)
2004	Don Matteo	Roberta	Episode: "Tre spari nel buio"
2007	Rino Gaetano: Ma il cielo è sempre più blu	Chiara Argelli	2 episodes
2012	Il sogno del maratoneta	Luciana	Television movie
2014–2015	Braccialetti rossi	Lilia Di Salvo	Recurring role
2017	1993	Arianna Rosato	Main role
2019	1994	Arianna Rosato	Episode: "Episodio 1"

== Advertising ==
- Luigi Lavazza S.p.A. (2004–2005) testimonial
- Vodafone (2006) testimonial
- Breil (2012) testimonial with Nicolas Vaporidis

Prizes and awards

- Prize Etruria Cinema as a revelation of the year (2005)
- Prize Simpatia (2009) – withdrawn at Capitoline Hill

== Gallery ==
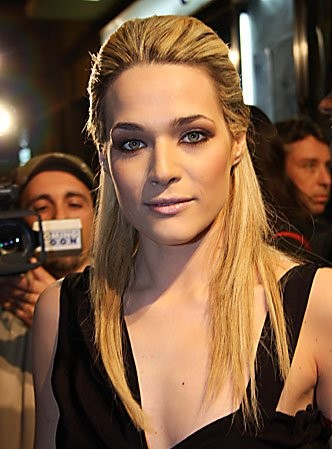

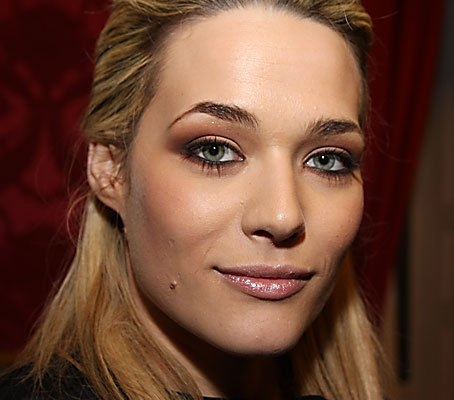

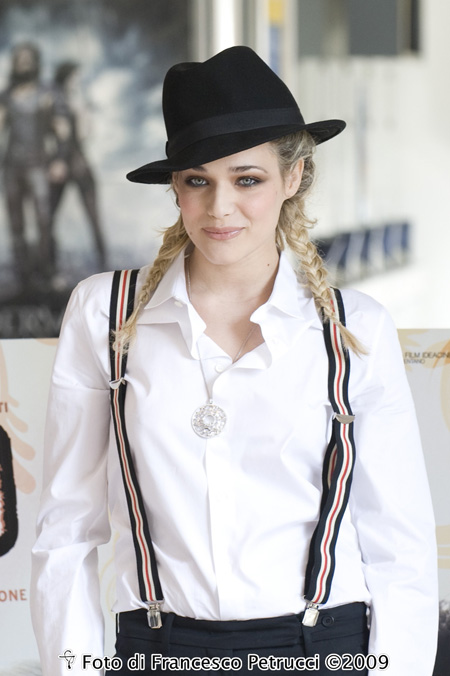

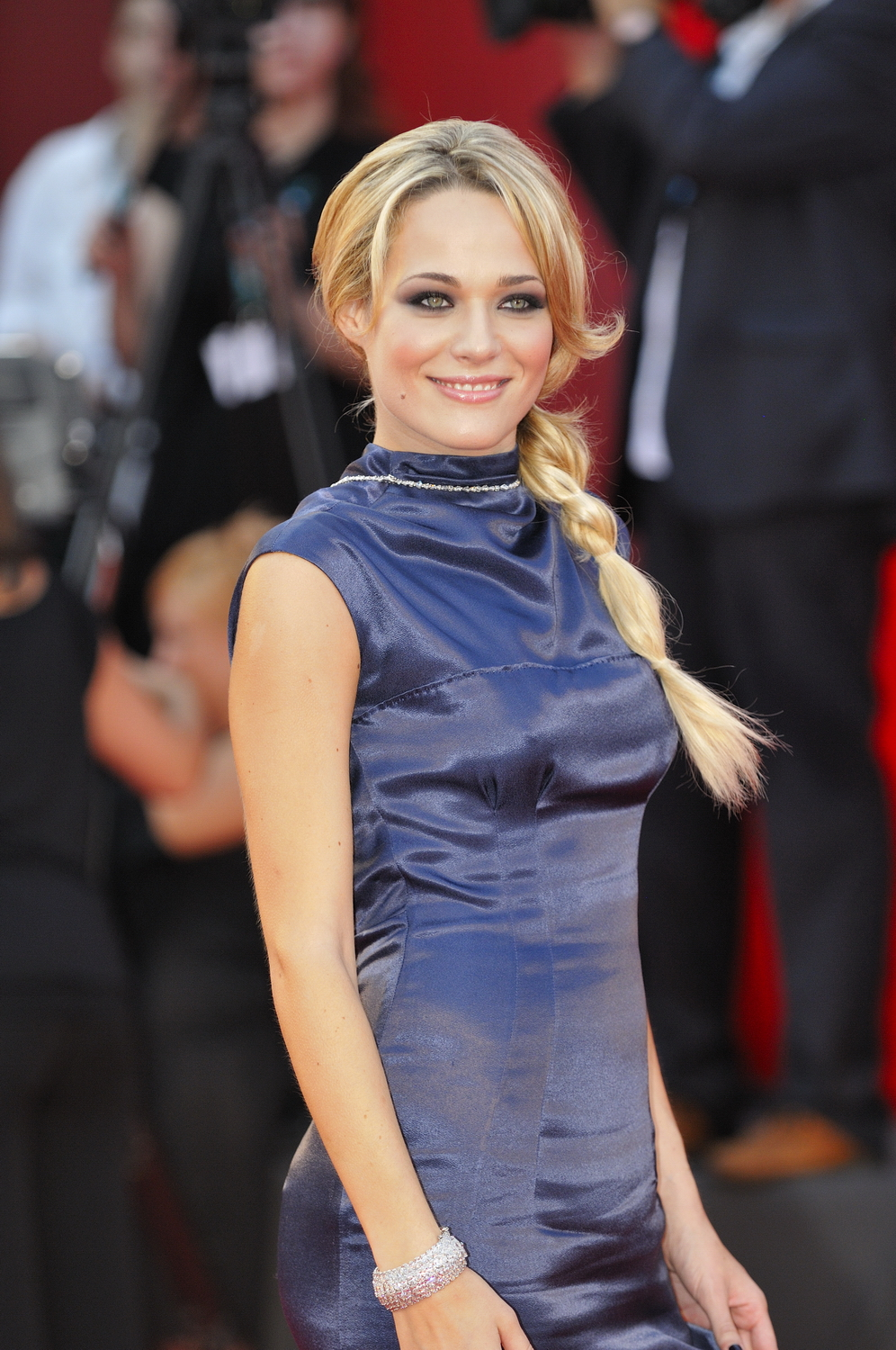
