= La cena di Natale =

2016 Italian comedy film

- Film poster
- Directed by: Marco Ponti
- Written by: Marco Ponti
- Based on: La cena di Natale (novel) by Luca Bianchini
- Produced by: Fulvio Lucisano; Federica Lucisano
- Starring: Riccardo Scamarcio; Laura Chiatti; Michele Placido; Maria Pia Calzone; Antonella Attili; Eugenio Franceschini; Antonio Gerardi; Veronica Pivetti; Eva Riccobono; Uccio De Santis
- Cinematography: Roberto Forza
- Edited by: Consuelo Catucci
- Music by: Gigi Meroni
- Release date: 24 November 2016 (Italy)
- Running time: 95 minutes
- Country: Italy
- Language: Italian

La cena di Natale (lit. 'The Christmas dinner') is a 2016 Italian Christmas comedy film directed by Marco Ponti.

The film is a sequel to the 2015 film Io che amo solo te.

== Cast ==
- Riccardo Scamarcio as Damiano Scagliusi
- Laura Chiatti as Chiara
- Michele Placido as don Mimì
- Maria Pia Calzone as Ninella Torres
- Antonella Attili as Matilde
- Eugenio Franceschini as Orlando Scagliusi
- Antonio Gerardi as Franco Torres
- Veronica Pivetti as Pina
- Eva Riccobono as Daniela
- Uccio De Santis as father Gianni
- Dario Aita as Mario
- Giulia Elettra Gorietti as Deborah
- Crescenza Guarnieri as Maura
- Ivana Lotito as Mariangela
- Angelo De Matteis as Antonio
- Massimo De Lorenzo as the doctor
