= Maria Pia Calzone =

Italian actress (born 1967)

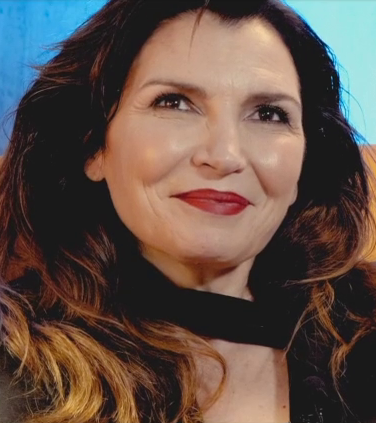
- Born: 10 October 1967 (age 58); Reino, Campania, Italy
- Education: Centro Sperimentale di Cinematografia • University of Naples "L'Orientale"
- Occupation: Actress
- Years active: 1988–present
- Known for: Gomorrah
- Website: www.mariapiacalzone.it

Maria Pia Calzone (Italian pronunciation: [maˈriːa ˈpiːa kalˈtsoːne]; born 10 October 1967) is an Italian actress. She's best known for her role as Immacolata "Imma" Savastano, in the first season of Italian crime drama series, Gomorrah (2014).

She graduated from Italy's national film school, the Centro Sperimentale di Cinematografia, and has a degree in Literature from the Università degli Studi di Napoli "L'Orientale" in Naples. Calzone has won the Premio Riccardo Cucciolla in 2006 for Best Lead Actress at the Festival di Vasto San Salvo and the Premio Ippocampo for Best Actress at the Festival di Trieste Maremetraggio 2006.

== Biography ==
Born in Reino, Campania, in the Province of Benevento but raised in Naples, she holds a bachelor's degree in literature with a specialization in contemporary art, and went on to graduate from the Centro sperimentale di cinematografia in Rome.

She made her Cinematography debut in 1988 with Lello Arena's Chiari di luna. In 2002 she played the part of the wife of leading actor Christian Bale in Kurt Wimmer US film Equilibrium.

In the 2000s she got her first leading roles: in 2005 she was the trans woman Desideria in the film Mother Nature (film) and in 2007 she played the Madonna in Giulio Base The Inquiry (2006 film).

Active in Television, she participated in Maurizio Ponzi E poi c'è Filippo, Giulio Base's Don Matteo 5 and Alberto Sironi's Ad occhi chiusi. In 2014, she played the female lead in Gomorrah (TV series),.

In October 2015 she was in theaters with Io che amo solo te adapted from Luca Bianchini's best seller and directed by Marco Ponti, where she plays Ninella Torres.

In 2015 he also takes part in the video clip of the unreleased Non ho che te by Luciano Ligabue.

In November 2016 she was in theaters with La cena di Natale, sequel to Io che amo solo te, also based on the Novel of the same name by Luca Bianchini and directed by Marco Ponti, again in the role of Ninella. In 2016 she began recording episodes for the TV series Sirene, which aired the following year on Rai 1.

In 2017 she participated in two films: Napoli velata by Ferzan Özpetek and I peggiori by Vincenzo Alfieri. In 2018 she was directed by Carlo Verdone in Blessed Madness, as well as a lot of theater.

Since June 9, 2020, she has been a founding member and board member of the National Union of Theatre and Audiovisual Performers (UNITA). She is also an ambassador for Telethon.

Between April and May 2023 she took part, with Antonio Folletto, in the filming of the movie SottoCoperta, produced by Minerva Pictures, Tile Storytellers, Bronx Film and Flicktales, directed by Simona Cocozza selected at the Bif&st in Bari.

== Filmography ==
=== Film ===
Year	Title	Role	Notes
1988	Chiari di luna	Foundry Worker	Uncredited
1994	De Generazione	Giulia	
1995	State Secret	Carola	
1997	Figurine	Luisa	
1998	Marriages	Matilde	
2001	Ribelli per caso	Dr. Del Giudice	
2002	Un Aldo qualunque	Officer Simonetti	
2002	Equilibrium	Viviana Preston	
2003	Pater Familias	Giovanni's Mother	
2005	Mother Nature	Desiderio	
2008	Marcello Marcello	Mrs. Lombardi	
2012	Aspromonte	Adelaide	
2015	Io che amo solo te	Ninella Torres	
2015	Let's Talk	Costanza	
2016	La cena di Natale	Ninella Torres	
2017	I peggiori	Loredana Miele	
2017	Cinderella the Cat	Angelica Carrannante	Voice role
2017	Naples in Veils	Rosaria	
2018	Blessed Madness	Ornella	
2023	SottoCoperta	Matrona	

=== Television ===
Year	Title	Role	Notes
1998	The Count of Monte Cristo	2nd Femme Marin	Miniseries
2000	Padre Pio: Miracle Man	Village Woman	Television movie
2000	Sei forte, maestro	Lucia Gasanti	Episode: "Piccoli e grandi segreti"
2000, 2003	Distretto di Polizia	Brioschi's Wife	Episode: "Sotto sequestro"
2000, 2003	Distretto di Polizia	Livia Persico	Episode: "Legami mortali"
2001	Donne di Mafia	Francesca	Television movie
2003	Salvo D'Acquisto	Gloria	Television movie
2006	Don Matteo	Margherita Perla	Episode: "Legittima difesa"
2006	The Inquiry	Mary, Mother of Jesus	Television movie
2007	Era mio fratello	Luisa Libertino	Miniseries
2008	L'avvocato Guerrieri – Ad occhi chiusi	Alessandra Mantovani	Episode: "Ad occhi chiusi"
2008	Il coraggio di Angela	Grazia	Television movie
2011	R.I.S. Roma – Delitti imperfetti	Mrs. Parrella	Episode: "2012"
2012	Anita Garibaldi	Enrichetta Pisacane	Miniseries
2014	Gomorrah	Immacolata "Imma" Savastano	Main role (season 1)
2017	Sirene	Marica	Main role
2020–2021	Dime Quién Soy: Mistress of War	Carla Alessandrini	Main role
2021	Una storia chiamata Gomorrah – La serie	Herself	Docuseries
2021	Non ti pago	Concetta Quagliolo	Television movie
2023	Resta con me	Nunzia Raimondi	Main role
2026	In Utero †	TBA	Upcoming series
