= Santa Maradona =

2001 film by Marco Ponti

- Directed by: Marco Ponti
- Starring: Stefano Accorsi; Anita Caprioli; Libero De Rienzo; Mandala Tayde
- Edited by: Walter Fasano
- Music by: Motel Connection; Mano Negra
- Release date: 2001
- Running time: 96 minutes
- Country: Italy
- Language: Italian

Santa Maradona is a 2001 Italian comedy film directed by Marco Ponti.

== Cast ==
- Stefano Accorsi as Andrea
- Anita Caprioli as Dolores
- Libero De Rienzo as Bartolomeo "Bart" Vanzetti
- Mandala Tayde as Lucia
- Fabio Troiano as Marco, Lucia's boyfriend
- Franco Neri as Pizzaiolo
