= Antonella Attili =

Italian film and television actress

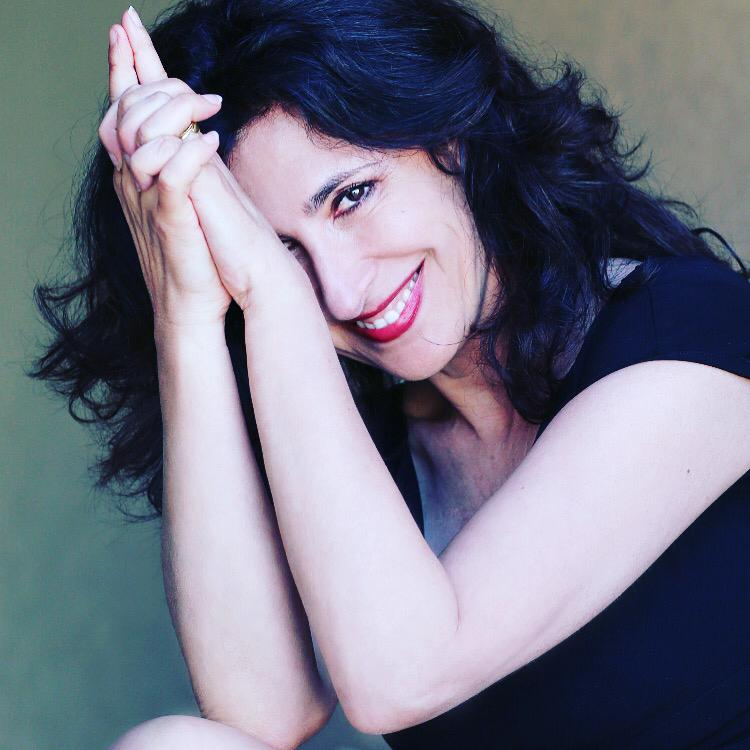
- Attili in January 2021
- Born: 3 April 1963 (age 63); Rome, Italy
- Years active: 1988–present

Antonella Attili (born 3 April 1963) is an Italian film, theater and television actress.

== Career ==
After performing in avant-garde theater, Attili made her film acting debut in 1988's critically acclaimed Cinema Paradiso, directed by Giuseppe Tornatore. Among other awards the film won the Grand Jury Prize at the Cannes Film Festival and the Oscar for best foreign film in 1989. In 1990 she once again worked with Tornatore for the film Everybody's Fine.

In 1993 she appeared in The Long Silence, Margarethe von Trotta 's only Italian film. In 1994 she worked on Pupi Avati's Declarations of Love, where she appeared among the protagonists alongside Delia Boccardo.

Stefano Incerti's 1999 film Prima del tramonto (Before Sunset) earned her a nomination for the Italian Nastro d'argento film award, for best supporting actress.

Attili regularly appears on the Italian television talk show Propaganda Live with a segment called "Antonella Atiili's Monologue", where she gives her views about various social, political and cultural topics.

== Personal life ==
Attili is an ambassador for children's rights charity Terres des Hommes, and supports environmental causes, receiving the Sentinel of Creation Award from environmental group Greenaccord in 2022. In her free time she often visits the cinema and theater.

== Filmography ==
=== Film ===
Year	Title	Role(s)	Notes
1988	Cinema Paradiso	Maria Di Vita	
1990	Everybody's Fine	Angela Virzì	
1990	Towards Evening	Stella's Friend	
1991	Cena alle nove	The Wife	
1993	The Long Silence	Fantoni's Wife	
1994	Declarations of Love	Gaby	
1994	Quando finiranno le zanzare	Professor's Wife	
1995	The Star Maker	Nurse	Cameo appearance
1996	The English Patient	Extra	Uncredited
1998	Un bugiardo in paradiso	Teresa	
1999	Prima del tramonto	Rosina	
2001	Unfair Competition	Giuditta Della Rocca	
2001	Quello che cerchi	Agnese	
2002	Solino	Rosa Amato	
2004	Windows	Shirley	Short film
2006	Don't Make Any Plans for Tonight	Andrea's Wife	
2007	SoloMetro	Massimo's Mother	
2008	Quiet Chaos	Gloria	
2010	Christine Cristina	Nanà	
2010	Hai paura del buio	Anna's Mother	
2011	Missione di pace	Teresa Vinciguerra	
2011	Horses	Amanda	
2011	Scattered Cloud	Rita	
2012	Balancing Act	Pension's Owner	Cameo appearance
2013	Amiche da morire	Mrs. Zuccalà	
2013	How Strange to Be Named Federico	Wanda	
2014	Arance & martello	Grazia Benussi	
2015	Lost and Beautiful	Journalist	Cameo appearance
2015	Io che amo solo te	Matilde	
2015	Quando a Roma nevica	Cosimo's Mother	Short film
2016	La cena di Natale	Matilde	
2017	I peggiori	Eva Perrot	
2017	Pure Hearts	Angela	
2017	The Music of Silence	Miss Giamprini	
2017	Rainbow: A Private Affair	Concetta	
2018	Dreamfools	Sonia	
2020	Tolo Tolo	Lella	
2020	Il ladro di cardellini	Olga	
2022	The Perfect Dinner	PM Maria Iodice	
2022	Per niente al mondo	Nadia	
2022	The Egg	Dr. Salemi	Short film
2022	The Desired War	Lea's Mother	
2022	The Wedding Days	Lietta	
2023	The Worst Days	Barbara	
2023	Castelrotto	Agnese	
2024	Il complottista	Susanna	

=== Television ===
Year	Title	Role(s)	Notes
1996	Dio vede e provvede	Ida	Episode: "La lucciola"
1996	Il caso Graziosi	Maria Cappa	Television movie
1998	Amico mio	Marinella	Main role (season 2)
2000	Don Matteo	Simonetta Gargani	Episode: "In attesa di giudizio"
2000	Vola Sciusciù	Clarice	Television movie
2003	Tutti i sogni del mondo	Ms. Farinelli	Television movie
2004	Le stagioni del cuore	Diana Castelli	Main role
2006, 2012	Distretto di Polizia	Simona Baresi	Episode: "Condannato a morte"
2006, 2012	Distretto di Polizia	Riccardo's Mother	Episode: "Il figlio sbagliato"
2007	Il giudice Mastrangelo	Antonella	3 episodes
2008–2009	Romanzo criminale – La serie	Maria, Libanese's Mother	Main role (season 1)
2008–2011	I liceali	Mrs. Campitelli	Recurring role
2009	Fratelli detective	Marco's Mother	Television movie
2009	Un caso di coscienza	Marcella	Episode: "Nessuna pietà"
2009–2010	Squadra antimafia – Palermo oggi	Lucia	6 episodes
2012	Mary of Nazareth	Saint Anne	Television movie
2013	I segreti di Borgo Larici	Rosa Olivieri	Main role
2014	Un posto al sole	Stefania De Falco	Recurring role
2016	Baciato dal sole	Caterina Sorrentino	Main role
2018–2023	The Ladies' Paradise	Agnese Amato	Series regular (season 3-6); guest star (season 7)
2021–present	Màkari	Marilù	Main role
2024	La Storia	Filomena Marrocco	2 episodes
2025	Tutto quello che ho	Vittoria Cassarà	Main role
2026	Morbo K – Chi salva una vita salva il mondo intero	Fernanda	Two-parts television movie
