= Io che amo solo te (film) =

- Directed by: Marco Ponti
- Written by: Marco Ponti; Luca Bianchini; Lucia Moisio
- Produced by: Federica Lucisano; Fulvio Lucisano
- Starring: Riccardo Scamarcio; Laura Chiatti; Michele Placido; Maria Pia Calzone; Luciana Littizzetto
- Cinematography: Roberto Forza
- Edited by: Consuelo Catucci
- Distributed by: IIF Film
- Release date: 22 October 2015
- Running time: 97 min
- Country: Italy
- Language: Italian

Io che amo solo te (Italian pronunciation: [ˈiːo ke ˈaːmo ˈsoːlo ˈte]) is a 2015 romantic comedy-drama film written and directed by Marco Ponti and starring Riccardo Scamarcio and Laura Chiatti. It is loosely based on a novel by Luca Bianchini, who also collaborated to the screenplay of the film. It debuted at the first place at the Italian box office.

== Plot ==
Ninella's daughter falls in love with the son of Don Mimì ...the man she always dreamed of marrying. Ninella's dream never became reality and history may repeat itself, when her daughter Chiara and Don Mimì's son Damiano find themselves involved in a whirlpool of different obstacles that may compromise their marriage as well.

== Cast ==
- Riccardo Scamarcio as Damiano
- Laura Chiatti as Chiara
- Michele Placido as Don Mimì
- Maria Pia Calzone as Ninella
- Antonella Attili as Matilde
- Michele Venitucci as Vito
- Luciana Littizzetto as Aunt Dora
- Grazia Daddario as Mrs. Campanella
- Angela Semerano as Nancy
- Eva Riccobono as Daniela
- Uccio De Santis as Uccio
- Eugenio Franceschini as Orlando
- Dario Bandiera as Pascal
- Beppe Convertini as Antonino
- Enzo Salvi as Giancarlo Showman
- Antonio Gerardi as Franco Torres
- Ivana Lotito as Mariangela
- Dino Abbrescia as Modesto
- Alessandra Amoroso as herself

== Sequel ==
A sequel film entitled La cena di Natale, loosely based on the novel of the same name by Luca Bianchini, was released on 24 November 2016.

== See also ==
- List of Italian films of 2015
