= Lino Guanciale =

Italian actor

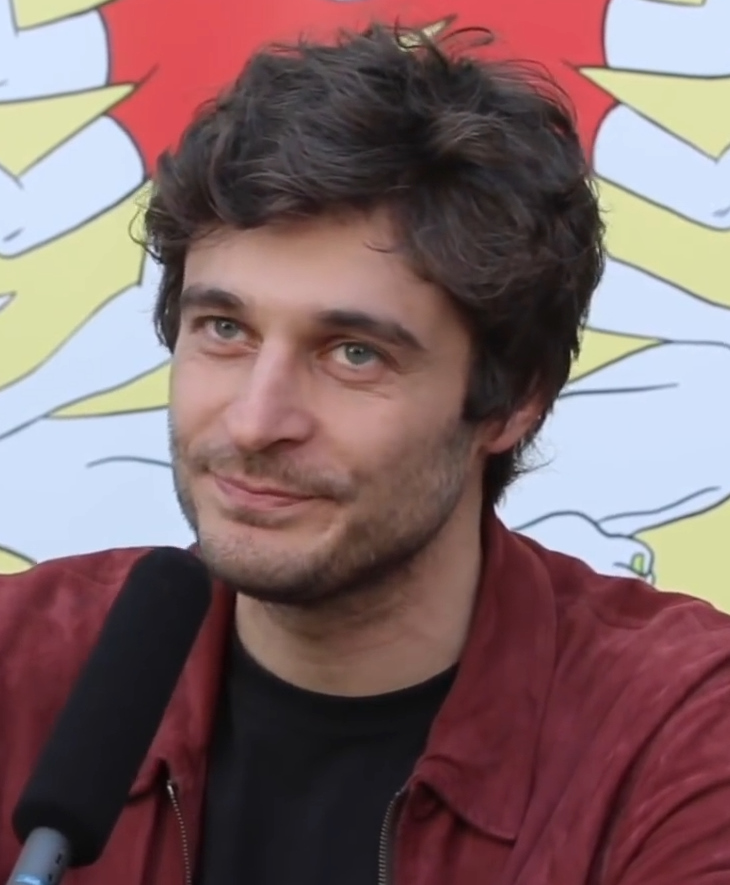
- Lino Guanciale in April 2017
- Born: May 21, 1979 (age 47); Avezzano, Italy
- Occupation: Actor

Lino Guanciale (born 21 May 1979) is an Italian actor.

== Early life ==
Born in Abruzzo, his father is a doctor and his mother is a teacher; he has a brother whose name is Giorgio. He graduated from Liceo Scientifico, and then he attended the Faculty of Humanities at the Sapienza University of Rome.

He played rugby for some time. He attended Accademia Nazionale di Arte Drammatica Silvio D'Amico and graduated in 2003, there he also obtained the Gassman Prize.

== Career ==
His career starts with theatre: acting in Romeo e Giulietta directed by Gigi Proietti. Then he worked with Franco Branciaroli, Luca Ronconi, Walter Le Moli, Massimo Popolizio, Claudio Longhi and Michele Placido.

Since 2005 he works as a teacher and as a scientific and theatrical popularizer at University and high school.

== Credits ==
=== Films ===
Year	Title	Role	Notes
2009	I, Don Giovanni	Wolfgang Amadeus Mozart	
2009	The Front Line	Piero	
2010	Angel of Evil	Nunzio	
2011	The Jewel	Filippo Magnaghi	
2011	Il sesso aggiunto	Valentino	
2011	Il mio domani	Lorenzo	
2012	To Rome with Love	Leonardo	
2012	Il volto di un'altra	Tru Tru	
2012	Discovery at Dawn	Marco Tessandori	
2013	Lao	Nephew	Short film
2015	Wondrous Boccaccio	Buffalmacco	
2016	Un'avventura romantica	Himself/ Journalist	Documentary film
2016	The Space Between	Claudio	
2017	I peggiori	Massimo Miele	Ciak d'Oro – Cineciak d'Oro. Premio MuMi – Actor of the Year
2017	Preghiera	Himself	Documentary film
2017	La casa di famiglia	Alex Lombardi	
2018	Show Dogs	Luthe (voice)	Voice-over-role; italian version
2018	Arrivano i prof	Antonio Cioncoloni	
2018	Pepita's	Andrea	Short film
2019	Lectura Ovidii	Himself	Documentary film
2021	Un marziano di nome Ennio	Carlo	
2023	The First Day of My Life	Tommaso	

=== Television ===
Year	Title	Role	Notes
2011	Il segreto dell'acqua	Doctor Mancino	Main role; 6 episodes
2012–15	Una grande famiglia	Ruggero Valentini	Main role; 17 episodes
2013–17	Che Dio ci aiuti	Guido Corsi	Main role (seasons 2–3), recurring role (season 4); 39 episodes
2015	La dama velata	Count Guido Fossà	Lead role; 12 episodes
2016	Don Matteo	Enrico Vinci	Episode: "Nei Secoli Fedele"
2016–18	Non dirlo al mio capo	Enrico Vinci	Lead role; 24 episodes
2016–20	L'allieva	Dr. Claudio Conforti	Lead role; 35 episodes
2017	Stanotte a Venezia	Himself	Special
2017–23	La porta rossa	Leo Cagliostro	Lead role; 32 episodes
2020	The Sea Beyond	Security guard	Episode: "Morire per vivere"
2021–present	Inspector Ricciardi	Inspector Luigi Ricciardi	Lead role; 10 episodes
2022	Noi	Pietro Peirò	Main role; 12 episodes
2022	Sopravvissuti	Luca Giuliani	Lead role; 10 episodes
2023	Un'estate fa	Elio Santamaria	Lead role; 8 episodes
2024	The Count of Monte Cristo	Luigi Vampa	Main role; 8 episodes
2026	Free Women	Mario Tobino	Lead role; 6 episodes

.

== Awards and nominations ==
=== Films and television ===
Award	Year	Category	Work	Result	Ref.
Ciak d'Oro	2017	CinèCiak d'oro	I peggiori	Won	
Ciak d'Oro	2021	Best Leading Actor in a Television Series	Il commissario Ricciardi	Nominated	
Ciak d'Oro	2023	Best Actor in a Television Series	Sopravvissuti	Won	
Ciak d'Oro	2024	Best Leading Actor in a Film	L'invenzione di noi due	Nominated	
Ciak d'Oro	2024	Best Leading Actor in a Television Series	Un'estate fa	Nominated	
Corti d'argento	2018	Best Actor in a ShortFilm	Il regalo di Alice	Won	
Flaiano Award for Cinema	2013	Best Supporting Actor	Un'avventura romantica	Won	
Italian Global Series Festival	2026	Best Actor in a Drama Series	I peggiori	Won	
Italian Global Series Festival	2026	Best Actor in a Miniserie	L'invisibile - La cattura di Matteo Messina Denaro	Nominated	
Nastri d'argento - Grandi Serie	2026	Special Award	Himself	Honoreed	

=== Theatre ===
Award	Year	Category	Work	Result	Ref.
Flaiano Award for Theatre	2013	Breakout Actor of the Year	Himself	Won	
Le Maschere Awards	2025	Best Lead Actor in a Play	Ho paura Torero	Won	
UBU Theatre Award	2013	Social Role of Theater Award	Himself	Honoreed	
UBU Theatre Award	2018	Best Actor in a Play	La classe operaia va in paradiso	Won	
