= Claudia Razzi =

Italian voice actress

- Born: 30 March 1962 (age 63); Rome, Italy
- Occupations: Voice actress; dubbing director
- Spouse: Luca Ward (m. 1983; div. 2004)
- Children: Guendalina Ward
- Father: Claudio Razzi

Claudia Razzi (born 30 March 1962) is an Italian voice actress.

== Biography ==
Razzi is well known for voicing Marion in the Winx Club films and for providing the Italian voice of Francine Smith in the Italian-language version of the animated series American Dad!. She also dubs Vicky in the Italian-language version of the Nickelodeon animated series The Fairly OddParents and Cleo in the Italian dub of Heathcliff and the Catillac Cats. In 2016 she appeared in the documentary film Being George Clooney.

She works at C.D. Cine Dubbing, Pumaisdue, Dubbing Brothers, and other dubbing studios in Italy.

== Voice work ==
- Marion in Winx Club: The Secret of the Lost Kingdom, Winx Club 3D: Magical Adventure

=== Dubbing ===
==== Animation ====
- Francine Smith in American Dad!
- Blaineley in Total Drama
- Cleo in Heathcliff and the Catillac Cats
- Vicky in The Fairly OddParents
- Mai Kirifuda in Duel Masters
- Oyuki (Episode 8) and Ran (Episodes 60 and 77) in Urusei Yatsura
- Doreen Nickle in The Ant Bully
- Hitomi Kisugi in Cat's Eye
- Miriam in Winx Club: The Secret of the Lost Kingdom
- Miriam in Winx Club 3D: Magical Adventure
- Pedro's wife in Excel Saga
- Eri Kagurazaka in Full Metal Panic! The Second Raid
- Claudia Schiffer's head in Futurama
- Ms. Millions in MegaMan NT Warrior
- Maggie's Mom in Maya & Miguel
- Ikuko Tsukino in Sailor Moon (Viz Media redub)
- Larry's Mom in VeggieTales
- Vexus in My Life as a Teenage Robot
- Arnold in Kipper
- Gingerbread Boy in Blue's Clues
- Cleo in Heathcliff (1984 TV series)
- Shereen Pena in Sarah Lee Jones (since 1998)
- Mileena in Invincible Steel Man Daitarn 3 (second dub)
- Big Mama in Sorcerer Hunters
- Diana, the Acrobat in Dungeons & Dragons
- Emily, the Corpse Bride in Corpse Bride
- Hyzenthlay in Watership Down
- Mizuha Miyama in Magic User's Club
- Yūko Ichihara in xxxHolic: A Midsummer Night's Dream
- Yūko Ichihara in The Princess in the Birdcage Kingdom
- Bécassine in Becassine and the Viking Treasure
- Flat Person in ChalkZone

==== Live action shows and films ====
- Red Queen in Alice in Wonderland
- Zoe Barnes in Defying Gravity
- Nova in Planet of the Apes
- Brigitte Parker in The Pretender
- Mrs. Lovett in Sweeney Todd: The Demon Barber of Fleet Street
- Switch in The Matrix
- Janice Higgins in Deep Blue Sea
- Odette Toulemonde in Odette Toulemonde
- Anna in The Night Listener
- Fabienne in Pulp Fiction
- Dr. Serena Kogan in Terminator Salvation
- Bella Zygler in The Round Up
- Allegra Cole in Hitch
- Lia in Play It to the Bone
- Norma in 11:14
- Raven Darkholme/Mystique in X-Men, X2, and X-Men: The Last Stand
- Kitty Galore in Cats & Dogs: The Revenge of Kitty Galore
- Betty Shin in Stark Raving Mad
- Robin Harris in The Cable Guy
- Nina Cortlandt in All My Children
- Helena Peabody in The L Word
- Mary Haines in The Women
- Roxanne Torcoletti in Eastwick
- Olga in Onegin
- Carolyn Crumley in Raines
- Meredith King in The Nine Lives of Chloe King
- Lieutenant Ana Ruiz in The Good Guys

== Work as a dubbing director ==
- Law Abiding Citizen
- The Body
- Just Like Heaven
- Jack and Sarah
- Bratz: Starrin & Stylin
- Life as We Know It (film)
- The Honeymooners
- Beauty & the Briefcase
- Prom
- American Pie Presents: The Naked Mile
- Brandy & Mr. Whiskers
- The Fourth Kind
- Greek
- Confessions of a Shopaholic
- Orphan
- Dolphin Tale
- The Nutcracker in 3D

== See also ==
- List of American Dad! voice actors
