= Francesco Arca =

Italian actor (born 1979)

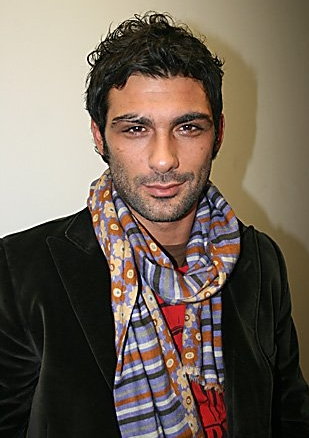
- Arca in 2008
- Born: November 19, 1979 (age 46); Siena, Italy
- Occupations: Actor; model

Francesco Arca (born November 19, 1979) is an Italian actor and model.

Born in Siena to a Sardinian father, in 2013 it was announced that he would be the successor of Ettore Bassi in the Austrian-Italian police TV series Inspector Rex. He played in the 16th, 17th and 18th season of the TV series Inspector Rex where he interpreted the role of Inspector Marco Terzani.

== Filmography ==
=== Films ===
Year	Title	Role(s)	Notes
2010	Sorry If I Want to Marry You	Photographer	Cameo appearance
2014	Fasten Your Seatbelts	Antonio	
2015	I calcianti	Savelli	
2015	Spectre	Francesco	
2022	Gli idoli delle donne	Filippo	

=== Television ===
Year	Title	Role(s)	Notes
2008	Incantesimo	Giacomo	2 episodes
2009	Don Matteo	Ferdinando Esposito	Episode: "Who Killed Toro Seduto?"
2010	Ho sposato uno sbirro	Antonio Branca	Main role (season 2); 24 episodes
2011	Che Dio ci aiuti	Filippo Misiti	Episode: "Sotto la maschera"
2012–2013	Le tre rose di Eva	Bruno Attali	Main role (season 1–2); 26 episodes
2012–2015	Rex	Marco Terzani	Recurring role; 32 episodes
2017	Il bello delle donne… alcuni anni dopo	Inspector Gadda	Episode: "Episode 7"
2017–2018	Sacrificio d'amore	Brando Prizzi	Lead role; 16 episodes
2018–2020	La vita promessa	Vincenzo Spanò	Main role; 6 episodes
2019	L'isola di Pietro	Valerio Ruggeri	Main role (season 3); 6 episodes
2020	Vite in fuga	Elio	Miniseries
2021	Svegliati amore mio	Domenico Giuliani	2 episodes
2021–2022	Guida astrologica per cuori infranti	Alejandro	Recurring role; 3 episodes
2022–present	Fosca Innocenti	Cosimo	Main role; 8 episodes

== Personal life ==
Arca began a relationship with Irene Capuano in 2013. Together, the couple has two children, born in September 2015 and April 2018.

His father was a paratrooper officer who died in a hunting accident in 1995. Arca published an autobiography on March 19, 2024, titled Basta che torni, confronting his relationship with his father and his untimely death.
