= Un amore di strega =

- Written by: Grazia Giardiello; Roberto Iannone
- Directed by: Angelo Longoni
- Starring: Alessia Marcuzzi; Pietro Sermonti; Anna Galiena; Luca Ward
- Theme music composer: Stefano Caprioli
- Country of origin: Italy
- Original language: Italian

Production
- Producers: Edwige Fenech; Constantino Margiotta; Francesco Martino
- Running time: 95 minutes
- Production company: Rete Televisiva Italiana (RTI)

Original release
- Network: Canale 5
- Release: 21 April 2009

Un amore di strega (lit. 'A witch's love') was an Italian TV movie from 2009, in which Alessia Marcuzzi, Pietro Sermonti, Anna Galiena and Luca Ward were the main cast.

== Plot ==
On her 30th birthday Carlotta, an organizer of weddings, discovers that her boyfriend is having an affair. Depressed, she doesn't realize that she received magical powers as a gift from her father, who she believed was dead. She discovered the possession only when she met the charming Ricardo Valenti, the manager that the mother has hired to save the business from bankruptcy. The two become a couple, but the sudden discovery of Carlotta's powers pushes Ricardo to marry his former girlfriend. It's up to Emma and Vlad, Carlotta's magical parents, stop it before it's too late.

== Broadcasting ==
The movie made its premiere in the Italian TV channel Canale 5 on April 29, 2009.

== See also ==
- List of films about witchcraft
