= Roundtrip (film) =

2004 Italian comedy film

- Directed by: Marco Ponti
- Written by: Marco Ponti
- Starring: Libero De Rienzo; Vanessa Incontrada
- Cinematography: Marcello Montarsi
- Edited by: Walter Fasano
- Music by: Motel Connection
- Distributed by: 01 Distribution
- Release date: 2004
- Country: Italy
- Language: Italian

Roundtrip (Italian: A/R Andata + Ritorno) is a 2004 Italian comedy film written and directed by Marco Ponti and starring Libero De Rienzo and Vanessa Incontrada.

== Cast ==
- Libero De Rienzo as Dante Cruciani
- Vanessa Incontrada as Nina
- Kabir Bedi as Tolstoj
- Remo Girone as Dante's Father
- Ugo Conti as Man in White
- Michele Di Mauro as Skorpio
- Fabio Troiano as Smeg
- Giuseppe Loconsole as Stampella
- Germana Pasquero as Number One

== See also ==
- List of Italian films of 2004
