= Chiara Gensini =

Italian actress

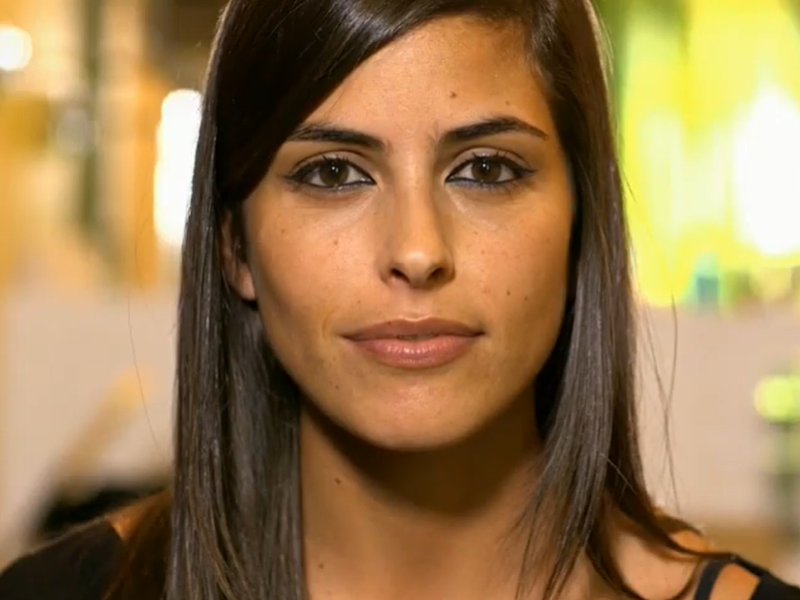
- Chiara Gensini
- Born: May 2, 1982 (age 44); Rome, Italy
- Occupation: Actress
- Modeling information
- Hair color: Brown
- Eye color: Brown

Chiara Gensini (Greek: Κιάρα Τζενσίνι, born 2 May 1982) is an Italian actress.

== Biography ==
Born in Rome, to an Italian father and a Greek mother, Gensini graduated at the London Drama School and also achieved the diploma of the fifth and sixth year at the Guildhall, London. In Rome she attended the acting course of Jenny Tamburi and that of Bernard Hiller in 2006.

She worked in theater, film and television. Among her credits the films Tickets (2005), directed by Ken Loach, and Virgin Territory (2007), directed by David Leland, and television dramas Born Yesterday (2006), Man of charity - Don Luigi Di Liegro (2007), Capri 2 (2008), I Cesaroni 3 (2009) and Un medico in famiglia (2013).
