= City Limits (2004 film) =

2004 film by Andrea Costantini

- Directed by: Andrea Costantini
- Written by: Andrea Costantini
- Starring: Edoardo Leo
- Cinematography: Daniele Massaccesi
- Edited by: Patrizia Ceresani
- Release date: 2004
- Country: Italy
- Language: Italian

City Limits (Italian: Dentro la città) is a 2004 Italian crime drama film written and directed by Andrea Costantini and starring Edoardo Leo. It won the award for best production at the 2005 Brooklyn Film Festival.

== Plot ==
Commissioner Aldo Chessari is sent to direct a police detachment on the outskirts of Rome, a temporary station in a hot area where he is entrusted with few means and few men. His deputy, Lorenzo Corsi, a young man just out of the Academy, collides with the corrupt and deformed reality of real life. The small police station appears to be a frontier outpost, a punitive destination where recruits and hotheads have been assigned. Chessari would like a quiet department, routine operations, stalking and wiretapping and no fuss that could affect his chances of career advancement. But his men, a group of mavericks, do not stop in front of the rules imposed by power, even reaching the limit of legality.

== Cast ==
- Edoardo Leo as Deputy Commissioner Lorenzo Corsi
- Elisabetta Cavallotti as Francesca Scanni
- Luca Ward as Dario Lattanzi
- Andrea Rivera as Benedetto aka Ben
- Rolando Ravello as Inspector De Paolis
- Giorgio Colangeli as Commissioner Chessari
- Simone Colombari as Franco Stiffi
- Luciano Curreli as Mariani
- Vincenzo Ferrera as Aglietti
- Patrizia Caselli as Mara
- Nello Mascia as Francesco
- Anna Longhi as Lorenzo Corsi's Grandma
