= Mother Nature (film) =

2005 film

- Directed by: Massimo Andrei
- Screenplay by: Massimo Andrei; Silvia Ranfagni
- Produced by: Kubla Khan
- Starring: Maria Pia Calzone; Vladimir Luxuria; Valerio Foglia Manzillo; Enzo Moscato; Gino Curcione; Fabio Brescia; Luca Ward
- Cinematography: Vladan Radovic
- Edited by: Shara Spinella
- Music by: Lino Cannavacciuolo
- Distributed by: Istituto Luce
- Release date: 2005
- Language: Italian

Mother Nature (Italian: Mater Natura) is a 2005 Italian comedy film directed by Massimo Andrei, in his directorial debut.

The film premiered at the 62nd edition of the Venice Film Festival in the Venice International Film Critics' Week sidebar, winning the Audience Award. For this film Andrei got a Silver Ribbon nomination for Best New Director.

== Cast ==
- Maria Pia Calzone as Desiderio
- Valerio Foglia Manzillo as Andrea
- Enzo Moscato as Europa
- Vladimir Luxuria as Massimino
- Franco Javarone as Guido
- Luca Ward as Lawyer Sacco
- Teresa Del Vecchio as Armandina
