= Chewingum =

1984 Italian teen comedy film

- Directed by: Biagio Proietti
- Written by: Castellano & Pipolo
- Produced by: Claudio Bonivento
- Starring: Mauro Di Francesco; Isabella Ferrari; Massimo Ciavarro; Mara Venier; Fabrizio Temperini; Orsetta Gregoretti; Liliana Eritrei; Enrico Montuori; Carlo Mucari; Luca Ward; Marina Viro; Sandro Ghiani; Marina Occhiena; Anna Melato
- Cinematography: Giuseppe Maccari
- Edited by: Raimondo Crociani
- Music by: Giancarlo Bigazzi
- Release date: 1984
- Running time: 100 minutes
- Language: Italian

Chewingum is a 1984 Italian teen comedy film directed by Biagio Proietti. It premiered at the 41st Venice International Film Festival in the "De Sica" section.

== Cast ==
- Mauro Di Francesco as Mauro Lorenzi
- Isabella Ferrari as Isabella De Santi
- Massimo Ciavarro as Massimo
- Mara Venier as Professor Emanuela Raveggi
- Marina Viro as Anna
- Orsetta Gregoretti as Orsetta
- Liliana Eritrei as Patrizia
- Carlo Mucari as Carlo
- Fabrizio Temperini as Fabrizio
- Luca Ward as Luca Antigoni
- Enrico Montuori as Enrico
- Anna Melato as Orsetta's mother
- Marina Occhiena as Marina
- Sandro Ghiani as the waiter
- Maurizio Donadoni as the barman
