= Vanessa Incontrada =

Spanish-Italian actress (born 1978)

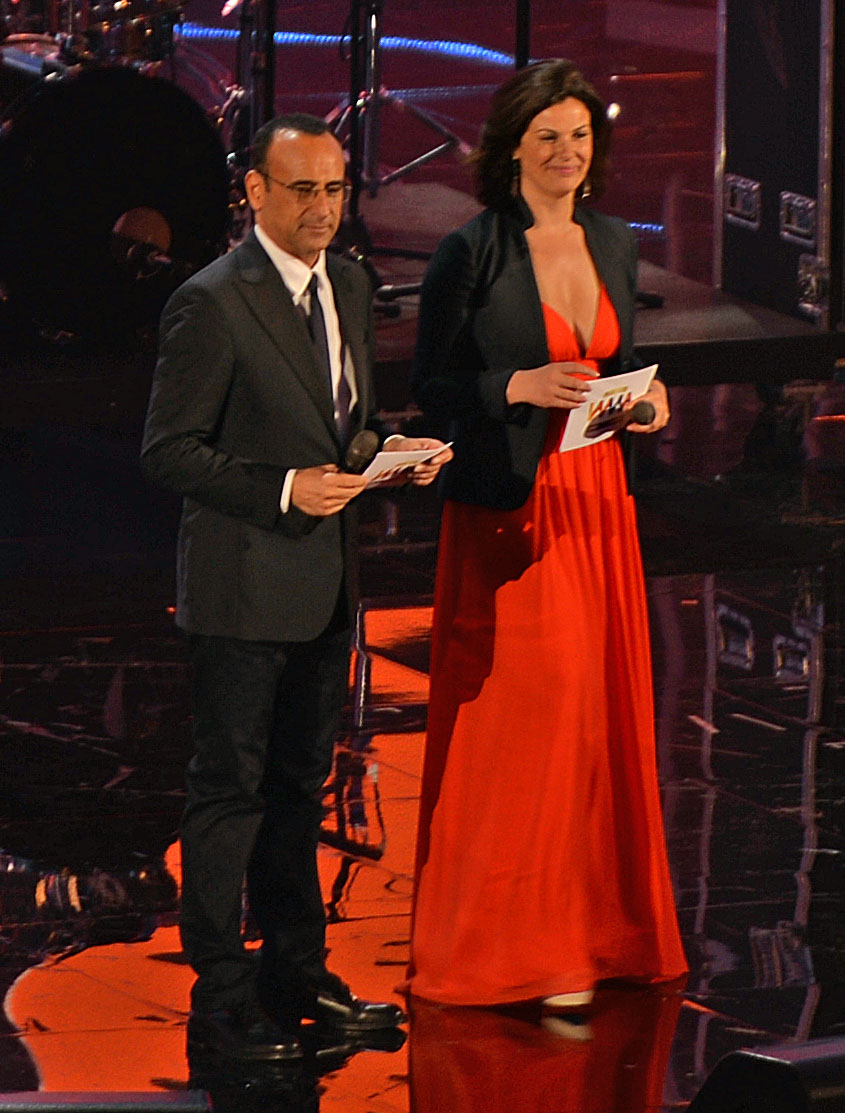
- Incontrada and Carlo Conti hosting the Wind Music Awards in 2016
- Born: Vanessa Incontrada Soler; 24 November 1978 (age 47); Barcelona, Catalonia, Spain
- Citizenship: Italy; Spain
- Occupations: Actress; model; television presenter
- Years active: 1995/1996–present (as model); 2003–present (as actress)
- Modeling information
- Height: 172 cm (5 ft 8 in)
- Hair color: Chestnut
- Eye color: Hazel

Vanessa Incontrada Soler (born 24 November 1978) is a Spanish-Italian actress, model, and television presenter. She starred in the 2003 Italian film Incantato.

== Early life and career ==
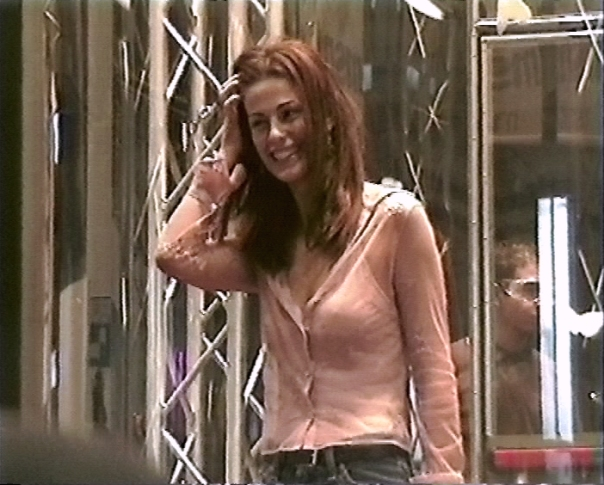
Incontrada in 2000

Born to an Italian father and a Spanish mother, Incontrada grew up between Barcelona and Follonica and is a native speaker of Spanish. She began her modeling career at the age of 17 and began appearing in film and television in 2003.

== Selected filmography ==
=== Film ===
List of film appearances, with year, title, and role shown
Year	Title	Role	Notes
2003	Incantato	Angela	
2004	Roundtrip	Nina	
2006	Quale amore	Antonia	
2006	A Dinner for Them to Meet	Clara Lanza	
2007	Tutte le donne della mia vita	Monica	
2009	Aspettando il sole	Kitty	
2013	Mi rifaccio vivo	Sandra Bianchetti	
2014	Ti sposo ma non troppo	Andrea	
2015	Tutte le vogliono	Chiara	
2017	Non c'è campo	Laura Basile	
2021	Ostaggi	Ambra	

=== Television ===
List of television appearances, with year, title, and role shown
Year	Title	Role	Notes
1998–2000	Super Classifica Show	Herself	Co-host
2001	Bande sonore	Herself	Special; host
2004–2010	Zelig	Herself	Co-host
2010	Un paradiso per due	Alice	Television film
2010	Let's Dance	Herself	Special; host
2011	I cerchi nell'acqua	Bianca Della Rocca	4 episodes
2012	Caruso, la voce dell'amore	Ada Botti Giachetti	2 episodes
2013	Benvenuti a tavola	Irene	12 episodes
2014	Un'altra vita	Emma Conti	6 episodes
2014	Angeli – Una storia d'amore	Luisa	Television film
2015	Italia's Got Talent	Herself	Host (season 6)
2016	Don Matteo	Lisa Marcelli	Episode: "Nei secoli fedele"
2016	La classe degli asini	Mirella Casale	Television film
2016–2018	Dance Dance Dance	Herself	Judge
2016–2018	Non dirlo al mio capo	Lisa Marcelli	24 episodes
2017	Scomparsa	Nora Telese	12 episodes
2018	Il capitano Maria	Maria Elena Guerra	4 episodes
2018	I nostri figli	Anna	Television film
2019	Purché finisca bene	Corinne	Episode: "L'amore, il sole e le altre stelle"
2020	Come una madre	Angela Graziani	6 episodes
2020	Amici di Maria De Filippi	Herself	Judge
2022–2023	Fosca Innocenti	Fosca Innocenti	8 episodes
