= Miriam Candurro =

Italian actress

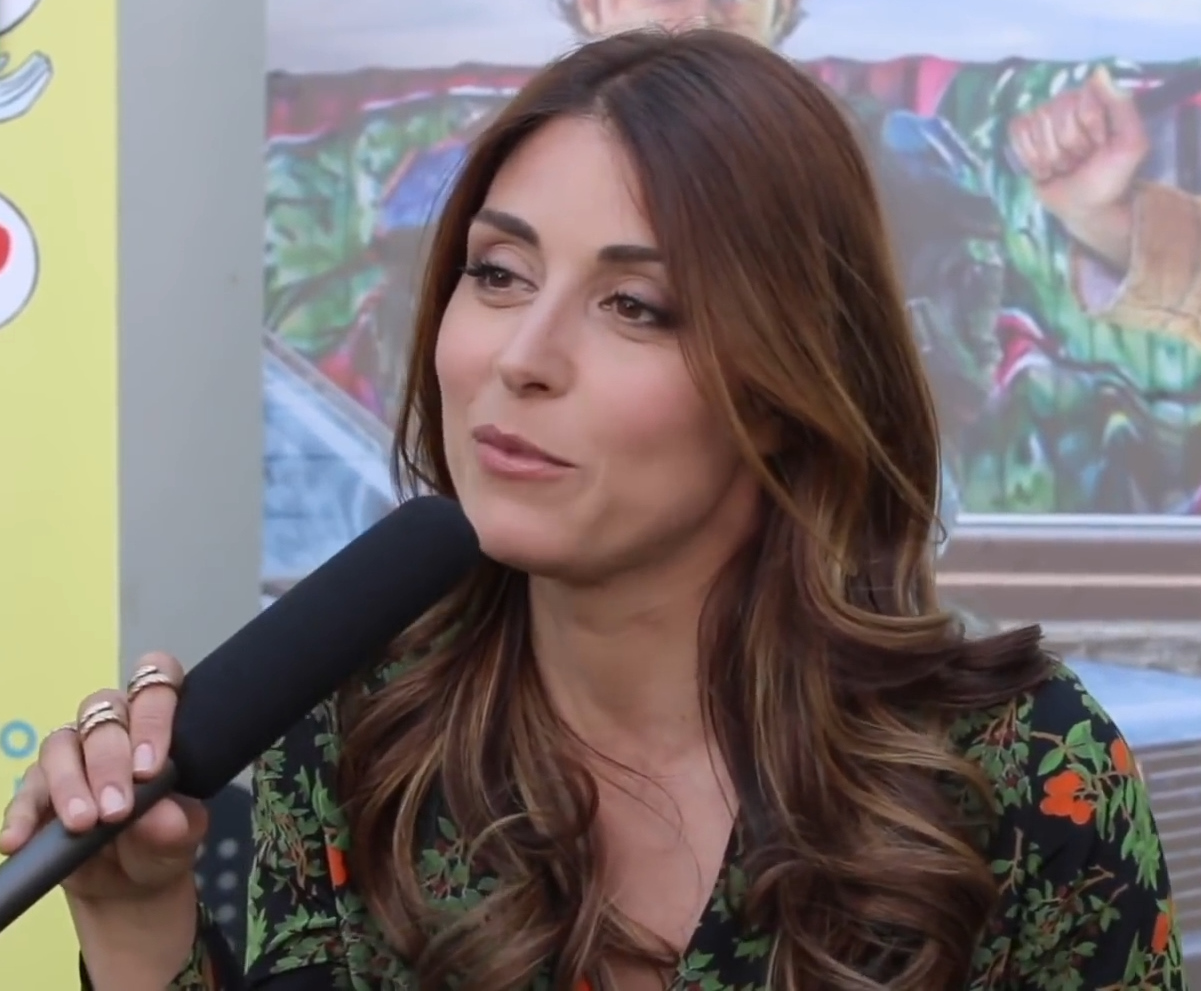
- Miriam Candurro
- Born: 10 October 1980 (age 45); Naples, Italy
- Occupation: Actress
- Years active: 2004–present

Miriam Candurro (born 10 October 1980) is an Italian actress.

== Early life and career ==
Miriam was born and lives in Naples, where she graduated at Liceo Classico Giuseppe Garibaldi, and where she later graduated in Classical Literature at the University of Naples Federico II.

In 2004 she made her debut as an actress with A Children's Story by Andrea and Antonio Frazzi, film winner of three David di Donatello. The complex and suffered role of Caterina will be worth the Domenico Rea Prize, as best new actress.

Subsequently she participates in various TV dramas: E poi c'è Filippo, with Neri Marcorè and Giorgio Pasotti, Angela, Rai 1 TV movie, with Sabrina Ferilli, Don Matteo 5, La squadra 7, The Inquiry. In 2007 she was the protagonist, together with Massimo Ranieri and Michelle Bonev, of the TV miniseries Operazione pilota, broadcast on Rai 1.

In 2008 she returned to the small screen with the successful TV series Capri, and to the big screen with the comedy La seconda volta non si scorda mai and with the Italian-American film The Eternal City. In 2010 she starred in Capri 3.

On 12 March 2012 she made her debut in the Rai 3 soap opera Un posto al sole in the role of Serena Cirillo.

In 2015 and 2016 she was testimonial of the Biancaluna brand photographed by Gaetano Mansi.

== Personal life ==
Miriam Candurro is married and has 2 children.

== Filmography ==
=== Television ===
- Angela, directed by Andrea Frazzi and Antonio Frazzi - TV film (2005)
- E poi c'è Filippo, directed by Maurizio Ponzi - TV series (2006)
- Don Matteo, directed by Giulio Base - TV series (2006)
- The Inquiry, TV series (2006)
- La squadra, TV series (2006)
- Operazione pilota, directed by Umberto Marino - TV series (2007)
- Capri 2, directed by Andrea Barzini and Giorgio Molteni - TV series (2008)
- Giochi sporchi, directed by David Emmer - TV series (2009)
- Capri 3, directed by Dario Acocella and Francesca Marra - TV series (2010)
- Un posto al sole, TV series (2012–present)
- Sotto copertura, directed by Giulio Manfredonia - TV series (2015)
- Don Matteo, directed by Daniela Borsese - TV series (2016)
- Non dirlo al mio capo, TV series (2016)
- The Bastards of Pizzofalcone, TV series (2017-2021)
- Che Dio ci aiuti, TV series (2017)
- Sotto copertura, directed by Giulio Manfredonia - TV series (2017)

=== Film ===
- La merendina tropicale, directed by Edoardo De Angelis (2005)
- Il colpo di pistola, directed by Laura Muscardin (2005)
- Noemi, directed by Sydney Sibilia (2007)
- Gunes, directed by Salvatore Allocca (2010)
- Orizzonti, directed by Sibilla Barbieri (2010)
