= Julio Navarrine =

Argentine singer, actor, poet, and composer

Personal details
- Born: December 20, 1889 Argentina
- Died: March 11, 1966 (aged 76)

Julio Navarrine (December 20, 1889 – March 11, 1966) was an Argentine singer, actor, poet and composer.

He is known for his tango lyrics, especially his song 1926 "Oro muerto", written with Juan Raggi.
