= Sargis Galstyan =

Armenian born Italian actor (born 1979)

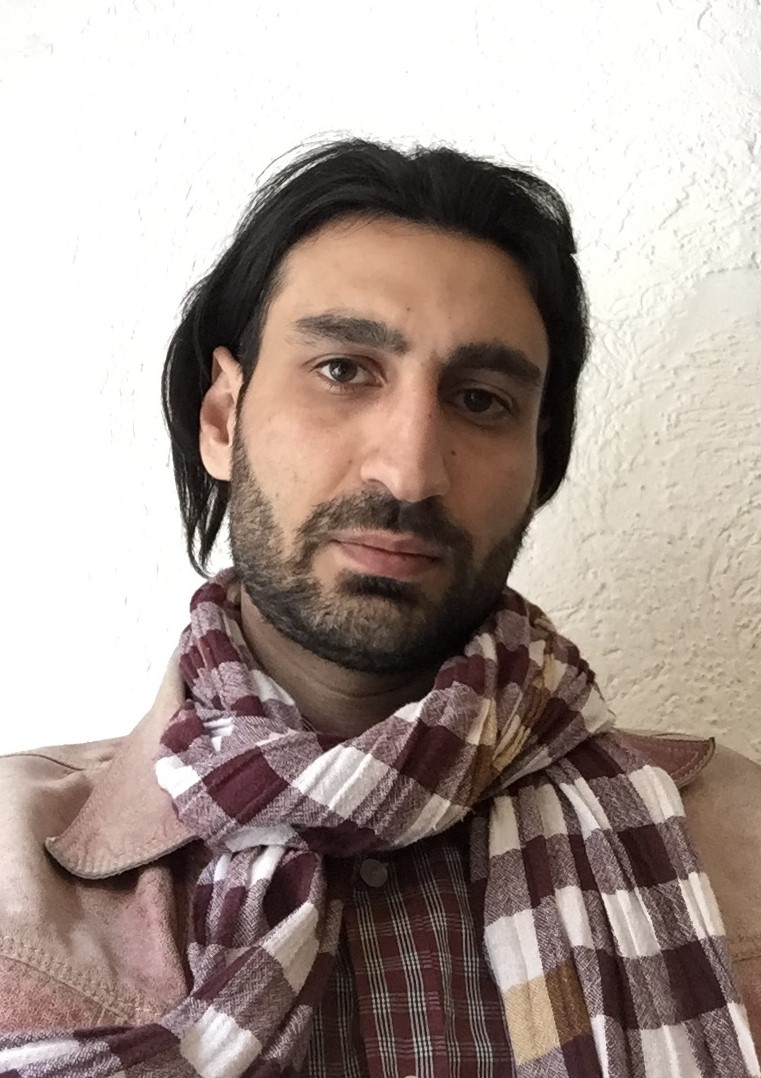
- Born: January 20, 1979 (age 46); Yerevan, Armenian SSR, Soviet Union
- Occupation: Actor
- Years active: 2000–present
- Spouse: Marine Galstyan

Sargis Galstyan (Armenian: Սարգիս Գալստյան; January 20, 1979), is an Armenian-born Italian actor, dancer and director. He arrived in Italy at the beginning of 2000 and developed his performances.

== Biography ==
He was born in 1979 and raised in Yerevan. In 1991 he attended the dance school at the Officers House and, in 1994, began attending the Yerevan State Choreography High School. In 2001 he graduated from the Armenian State Pedagogical University as director-choreographer.

From 1996 to 2004 he was the principal dancer of the Barekamutyun State Dance Complex of Armenia. In 2000 he founded the tip-tap school SNG Step Studio.

In 2004 he moved to Italy. In 2012 he founded, with his wife Marine, the Italian-Armenian Cultural Association Incontroverso. He speaks English, Armenian, Italian, and French.

=== Awards ===
- 2002: Grand Prix at the International Festival Голос Друзей, Sochi.

== Filmography ==
=== Television ===
- In the Same Garden, (2016)
- Fuoco Amico, (2016)
- Il resto con i miei occhi, dir. Massimiliano Amato (2017)
- Rocco Schiavone, (2018)
- Un Posto Al Sole, (2020)
- Fosca Innocenti, (2022)
- Il Re, dir. Giuseppe Gagliardi (2023)
- Assassin Club, dir. Camille Delamarre (2023)

== Theatre ==
=== As director ===
- Il grande male, 2015, Teatro India
- Blablateca di Tango
- Pole dance, 2019–2023, Teatro Cometa Off
- La casa delle api, 2023, Teatro Cometa Off
- Quattro cavalieri dell'Apocalisse, 2024
