= Biagio Proietti =

Italian film director and screenwriter (1940–2022)

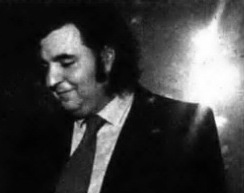
- Born: 23 June 1940; Rome, Italy
- Died: 12 March 2022 (aged 81); Rome, Italy
- Occupation(s): Screenwriter, director

Biagio Proietti (23 June 1940 – 12 March 2022) was an Italian screenwriter, director and writer.

== Life and career ==
Born in Rome, graduated in law, Proietti started his career as an assistant director of Francesco Maselli in Time of Indifference. He made a name for himself as a screenwriter of a number of successful television gialli films and series, often directed by Daniele D'Anza and which he often wrote together with his wife Vittoria Prisco. He made his directorial debut with the TV-movie Storia senza parole, and in the 1980s directed two teen comedies.

Proietti was also a novelist, a radio writer, a playwright and a documentarist. He died on 12 March 2022, at the age of 81.

== Selected filmography ==
Screenwriter

- Kill Me Quick, I'm Cold, directed by Francesco Maselli (1967)
- A Taste of Death, directed by Sergio Merolle (1968)
- Psychout for Murder, directed by Rossano Brazzi (1969)
- Coralba (TV, 1970)
- Death Occurred Last Night, directed by Duccio Tessari (1970)
- The Killer Reserved Nine Seats, directed by Giuseppe Bennati (1974)
- Dov'è Anna? (TV, 1976)
- The Black Cat, directed by Lucio Fulci (1981)

Director and screenwriter

- Chewingum (1984)
- Puro cashmere (1986)
