= Patrizia Caselli =

Italian actress (1960–2026)

- Born: 13 May 1960; Udine, Italy
- Died: 9 June 2026 (aged 66); Milan, Italy
- Occupation: Actress

Patrizia Caselli (13 May 1960 – 9 June 2026) was an Italian actress and television presenter.

Caselli began her career in the 1970s as a television actress and presenter with Antennatre and Telealtomilanese. She also took part in a small amount of singing and stage acting, including a solo in the show Master 88. In 1993, she co-hosted the television program Ricomincio da due.

Caselli died from lung cancer on 9 June 2026, at the age of 66.

== Filmography ==
=== Film ===
- La fabbrica del vapore (2000)
- City Limits (2004)

=== Television ===
- Bella d'estate (1987)
- Chi tiriamo in ballo? (1987)
- Vita in diretta (1991–1994)
