= Galust Aloyan =

Armenian fedayi

- Born: 1864; Yerevan
- Died: 1914 (aged 49–50); Beyazid, Western Armenia
- Military career
- Branch: Armenian fedayi
- Conflicts: Armenian national liberation movement

Galust Aloyan (Armenian: Գալուստ Ալոյան; 1864 in Yerevan – 1914) was an Armenian fedayi and one of the Armenian national liberation movement figures.
