= Marine Galstyan =

Armenian born Italian actress (born 1980)

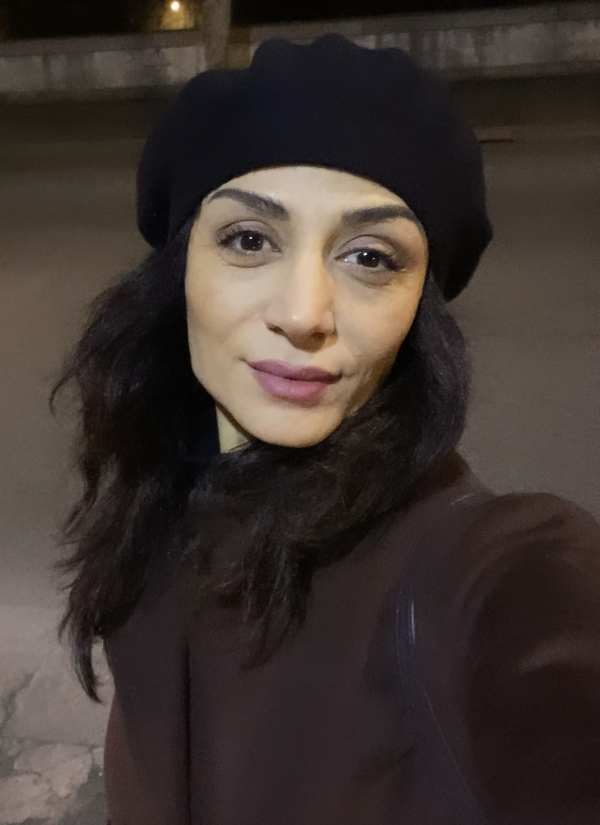
- Born: June 14, 1980 (age 45); Yerevan, Armenian SSR, Soviet Union
- Other names: Mariné Galstyan
- Occupation: Actress
- Years active: 2000–present

Marine Galstyan (Armenian: Մարինե Գալստյան; June 14, 1980), sometimes credited as Mariné Galstyan, is an Armenian-born Italian actress. She has appeared as a guest star in several television series and has acted in feature films.

== Biography ==
Born in Yerevan in 1980, she studied at the Eravan Theater and Cinema Academy, in 1999 she undertook a course of studies at the State Academy of Theater and Cinema, obtaining a degree in direction at the faculty of theatrical art. From 2000 to 2003 she hosted the television program Parnas on Armenia 1 and in 2002 she graduated from the Municipal Dance Center of Yerevan. In 2003 she moved to Italy where she joined the cast of the film Bella of Notre Dame De Paris and the following year, in 2004, she starred in T'amo e t'amrò by Arthur Vardanyan. Between 2003 and 2006 she attended the Yerevan University of Dramatic Arts where she graduated as a theater and film actress. Since 2006 you have been teaching Argentine tango and flamenco in some Italian dance schools. In 2012 he founded the Italian-Armenian Cultural Association and the theater company InControVerso. In 2008 she starred as the protagonist in the films Il caso di Amati Malik by Emanuele Turbanti, in 2013 in Miradas by Lorenzo Righini and in 2016 in In the Same Garden by Ali Asgari.

In area theatre she was the protagonist and choreographer in The strange night by Vito Renica, The sold out apartment by Vanessa Gasparri, The Great Male by Sargis Galstyan, The rest with my eyes by Max Amato, Reality by Alessandro Sena. In her artistic career she has played roles of various kinds, including: Lady Macbeth (Macbeth), Ophelia (Hamlet ), Dorotea (Dangerously) and Ines Serrano (No Exit), furthermore as a director he has staged works such as: No Exit by Jean-Paul Sartre, The house of Bernarda Alba by García Lorca and Marriage Proposal.

In the cinematographic area, she has contributed to independent productions and major films such as Corrida de Toros, A Place in the Sun, country, In the Same Garden and The boy from Giudecca.

=== Private life ===
She speaks English, Armenian, Italian, and Russian.

She is married to her colleague and compatriot Sargis Galstyan.

== Filmography ==
=== Film ===
- Bella, dir. Notre Dame De Paris (2003)
- T'amo e t'amerò, dir. Arthur Vardanyan (2004)
- Il caso di Amati Malik, dir. Emanuele Turbanti (2008)
- Miradas, dir. Lorenzo Righini (2013)
- Coupe Fatale, dir. Raffaele Totaro (2013)
- Il ragazzo della Giudecca, dir. Alfonso Bergamo (2016)
- In the Same Garden, dir. Ali Asgari (2016)
- Il resto con i miei occhi, dir. Massimiliano Amato (2017)
- Corrida de Toros, dir. Fabio Romani and Fabio Pollio (2021)

=== Television ===
- Parnas (Armenia1, 2000–2003)
- Tutto il mondo è paese (2020) dir. Giulio Manfredonia
- Un posto al sole (2020)
