= Capri (TV series) =

- Genre: Romantic drama
- Created by: Carlo Rossella
- Starring: Gabriella Pession; Kaspar Capparoni; Sergio Assisi; Maria Comegna; Isa Danieli; Bianca Guaccero; Antonella Stefanucci; Chiara Gensini; Alexandra Dinu; Miriam Candurro; Gabriele Greco; Lucia Bosè; Fabrizio Nevola; Fabio Ghidoni; Laura Barriales
- Country of origin: Italy
- Original language: Italian
- No. of seasons: 3
- No. of episodes: 38

Production
- Running time: 100 min.

Original release
- Network: Rai Uno
- Release: October 15, 2006 – April 12, 2010

Capri is an Italian television series produced by Rai Fiction. The story involves a young woman from Milan, Vittoria Mari (played by Gabriella Pession), who discovers, one month before she is to be married, that she has been named as a beneficiary in the will of a woman she has never met. She travels to the island of Capri to find out why, becomes entwined in the lives of the people she meets, and learns something shocking about her past. The two other main characters in the drama are brothers Massimo (played by Kaspar Capparoni) and Umberto (played by Sergio Assisi).
