= Julia Navarro =

Spanish novelist and journalist

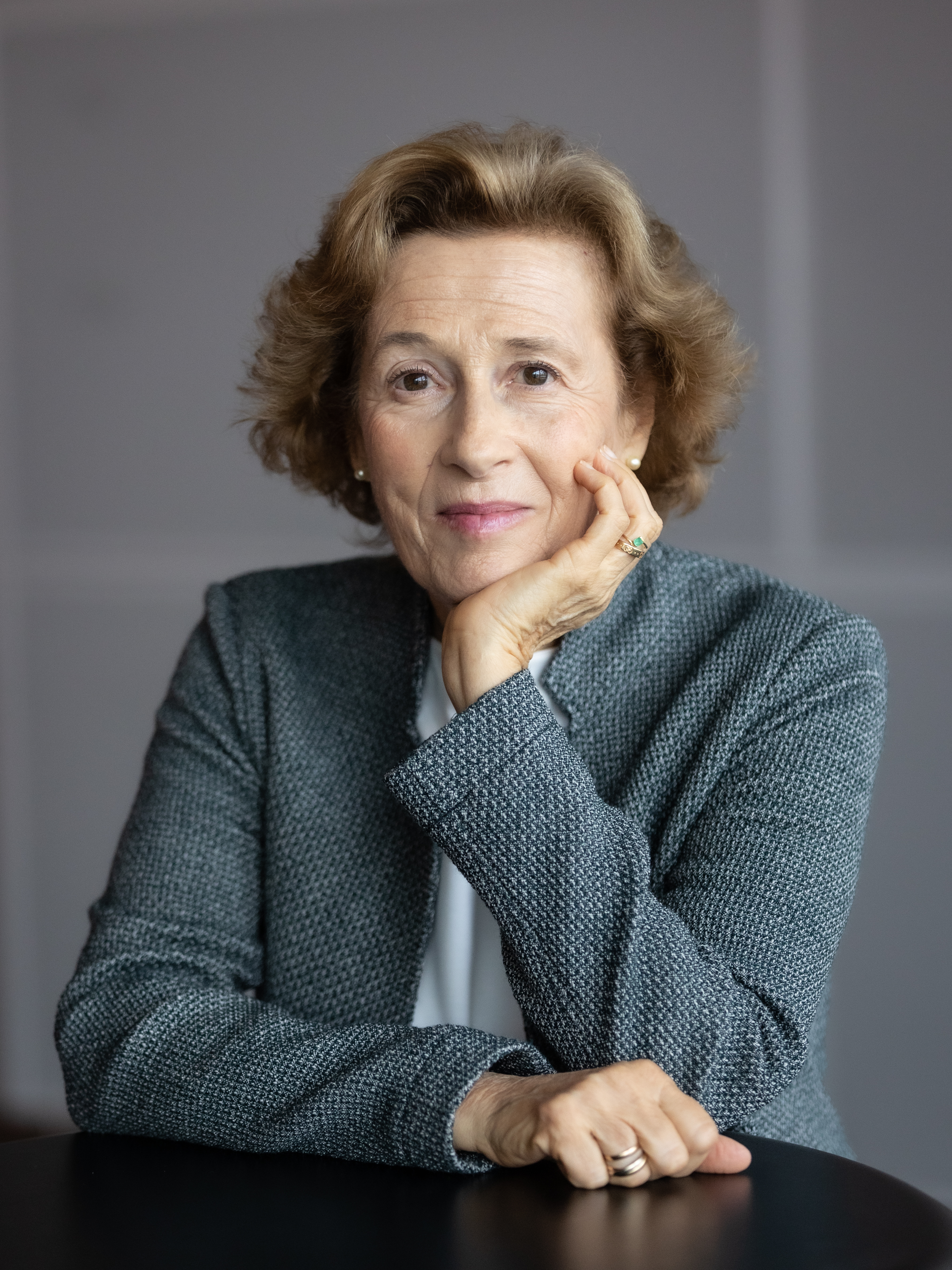
Navarro at the 2022 Frankfurt Book Fair

Julia Navarro (Born Madrid, 1953) is a Spanish novelist and journalist. She is the daughter of Spanish journalist, Felipe Navarro "Yale". After writing books on current affairs and politics, she published her first novel The Brotherhood of the Holy Shroud, which was on best-seller lists, both in Spain and abroad.

== Career ==
Navarro has been a journalist since 1983. She has contributed to Spanish media outlets Cadena SER, Cadena Cope, Telecinco, Canal Sur, and OTR Agency/Europa Press. She began her professional career during Spain’s transition to democracy. She reported on the journalistic era that she lived through, writing ongoing analysis on the country’s social evolution toward a new constitution in 1978. In 2010-2011, she participated in political roundtable discussions on the Telemadrid program Madrid opina. Currently, she is a political analyst for OTR Agency/Europa Press and a frequent editorial writer on political issues for Escaño Cero1.

Navarro’s novels have been translated into more than thirty languages.

== Awards and honours ==
She has been awarded the Premio Qué Leer for best Spanish novel, VIII premio de los Lectores de Crisol, Premio Ciudad de Cartagena, Premio Pluma de Plata de Bilbao, Premio Protagonistas de Literatura and the Premio Más que Música de los Libros.

== Selected works ==
=== Novels ===
- La Hermandad de la Sábana Santa (2004; tr:The Brotherhood of the Holy Shroud)
- La Biblia de barro (2005; tr: The Bible of Clay)
- La sangre de los inocentes (2007; tr: The Blood of the Innocent)
- Dime quién soy (2010; tr: Tell Me Who I Am)
- Dispara, yo ya estoy muerto (2013; Tr: Shoot, I’m Already Dead)
- Historia de un canalla (2016; Tr: A Scoundrel's Story, or Story of a Sociopath)
- Tu no matarás (2018)
- De ninguna parte (2021; Tr: Out of nowhere)

=== Non-fiction ===
- 1982-1996, entre Felipe y Aznar (tr: 1982-1996, Between Felipe and Aznar)
- Nosotros, la transición (tr: We, The Transition)
- La izquierda que viene (tr: The Left To Come)
- Señora Presidenta (tr: Madame President)
- El nuevo socialismo: la visión de José Luis Rodríguez Zapatero (tr: The New Socialism: José Luis Rodríguez Zapatero’s Vision)

== Personal life ==
On April 16, 1983, she married the journalist Fermín Bocos.
