= Beau St. Clair =

American film producer

- Born: Beau Marie St. Clair; 1952; California, U.S.
- Died: January 9, 2016 (aged 63–64); Malibu, California, U.S.
- Occupation: Film producer
- Spouse: Lloyd Phillips

Beau Marie St. Clair (c. 1952 – January 9, 2016) was an American film producer. In 1996, St. Clair, together with her friend and producing partner, actor Pierce Brosnan, established Irish DreamTime, a production company whose credits include The Thomas Crown Affair (1999), Evelyn (2002), Laws of Attraction (2004), The Matador (2005), The November Man (2014) and I.T. (2016).

St. Clair, a California native, also worked as a production supervisor for several Broadway shows, including The Threepenny Opera in 1989 and Shōgun: The Musical in 1990. During the 1980s and 1990s, she worked as an assistant to film producer Jerome Hellman, including work on The Mosquito Coast (1986). Her other assistant producing credits included Hideaway(1995), Race the Sun (1996) and The Edge (1997).

St. Clair and Brosnan were longtime friends by the mid-1990s. Brosnan had starred as James Bond in 1995's GoldenEye, the seventeenth film in the Bond series. GoldenEye, a commercial success, was a boost to Brosnan's career. He and St. Clair decided to begin producing films. In a 2014 interview, Brosnan recalled: "When GoldenEye … had the success that it had, we said, 'Let's make movies. Let's step forth and create our own projects.' It's as simple as that, really." Together, Beau St. Clair and Pierce established the Irish DreamTime production company in 1996, with additional backing from Metro-Goldwyn-Mayer (MGM).

Under St. Clair and Brosnan, Irish DreamTime produced and released ten films between 1998 and 2016. Their first production was The Nephew, a drama released in 1998. They then produced the remake of The Thomas Crown Affair (1999), which starred Brosnan and Rene Russo. Other Irish DreamTime films have included Evelyn (2002), Laws of Attraction (2004), The Matador (2005) and The November Man (2014). St. Clair also produced Irish DreamTime's I.T., a 'tech' thriller released in 2016. She also produced the 2002 remake, Rollerball.

Her husband, film producer Lloyd Phillips, died from a heart attack in January 2013. Beau St. Clair died following a lengthy illness with ovarian cancer at her home in Malibu, California, on January 9, 2016, at age 63.

Brosnan, whose first wife, Cassandra Harris, and her daughter, Charlotte, also both died of ovarian cancer, released a statement following her death: "My dearest friend Beau Marie St Claire passed away on Saturday, Jan 9th from Ovarian Cancer. She fought this insidious disease valiantly for ten long years. Beau was the sister I never had, my dearest friend for 30 years, and my producing partner at Irish Dreamtime, a company we formed twenty years ago. In that time we produced 10 films including The Thomas Crown Affair, The Matador, Evelyn, The November Man, and this past summer a thriller called IT. Beau Marie was a beautiful woman in every way. She had style, grace, humor, intellect, and a kind heart that I will forever miss."

== Filmography ==
She was a producer in all films unless otherwise noted.

=== Film ===
Year	Film	Credit	Notes
1995	Hideaway	Associate producer	
1996	Race the Sun	Associate producer	
1998	The Nephew		
1999	The Thomas Crown Affair		
1999	The Match	Executive producer	
2002	Rollerball		
2002	Evelyn		
2004	Laws of Attraction		
2005	The Matador		
2006	Have Mercy		
2007	Butterfly on a Wheel	Executive producer	
2009	The Greatest		
2014	The November Man		
2014	Some Kind of Beautiful		Final film as a producer
2016	I.T.		Posthumous credit

Miscellaneous crew

Year	Film	Role
1986	The Mosquito Coast	Assistant to producer

Thanks

Year	Film	Role
2009	The Lost Tribe	Very special thanks
2015	Miss You Already	Special thanks
2016	I.T.	In loving memory of
