= List of songs about Dublin =

This is a list of songs about Dublin, Ireland, including parts of the city such as individual neighborhoods and sections, and famous personages, arranged chronologically.

== 18th century ==
- "The Night Before Larry Was Stretched" - about the night before a hanging, in old Newgate cant; recorded by Frank Harte. Other Dublin execution ballads from this period include "The Kilmainham Minit", "Luke Caffrey's Ghost" and "Larry's Ghost".
- "The Dublin Privateer", late 1700s
- "The Dublin Baker", late 1700s
- "The Dublin Tragedy, or, the Unfortunate Merchant's Daughter", late 1700s
- "Miss King of Dublin", late 1700s
- "The Country Recruit's Description of the Military", late 1700s
- "A New Song on the Police Guards", late 1700s
- "The May Bush", late 1700s
- "Lock Hospital" (also known as "St. James Hospital" and "The Unfortunate Rake") - Irish version of a song also found in Britain and the USA (where it developed into "The Dying Cowboy" and "St. James Infirmary)"

== 19th century ==
- "Ye Men of Sweet Liberties Hall" - written by Dubliner Zozimus (Michael Moran, 1794–1846) about the Dublin Liberties.
- "The Holly and Ivy Girl" - a Christmas song written by John Keegan (1809–1849).
- "Donnelly and Cooper" - relates a bout between the Dublin boxer and an Englishman, from about 1845
- "The Twangman" - a comical murder ballad attributed (by Dominic Behan) to Zozimus (Michael Moran).
- "The Finding of Moses" - a comical ballad attributed to Zozimus (Michael Moran).
- "Molly Malone" - probably the best-known song about Dublin.
- "Courtin' in the Kitchen" - a music-hall-type song made popular by Delia Murphy.
- "The Spanish Lady" - a man becomes enamoured of a Spanish lady; versions of this popular song were recorded by Al O'Donnell, the Clancy Brothers and the Dubliners.
- "The Return of Pat Malloy"
- "The Little Beggarman" - sung to the melody of the "Red-Haired Boy", recorded by The Clancy Brothers.
- "General Guinness" - a song about the stout from Dublin, recorded by The Boys of the Lough.
- "Miss Brown of Dublin City" - a murder ballad related to "The Cruel Ship's Carpenter", recorded by Ed McCurdy.
- "'Twas in the end of King James's Street" - a romance ending in tragedy, from the Petrie collection
- "The Humours of Donnybrook Fair", 1830-1850 - at least three songs were written about Donnybrook Fair.
- "Hannah Healy, the Pride of Howth", c. 1840 - about a girl from Howth.
- "The Phenix of Fingal", c. 1840
- "Catherine Skelly, for the Drowning of her Child", c. 1850
- "Willy O", c. 1850
- "The Seducer Outwitted", c. 1850
- "Tim Finigan's Wake" - also known as "Finnegan's Wake" - mid 19th-century broadside and music-hall song published in New York, attributed to John F. Poole. to an air called "The French Musician"
- "Sally and Johnny", c. 1854
- "The True-Lovers' Trip to the Strawberry Beds", c. 1854 - about a trip to a favourite courting spot.
- "The Night of the Ragman's Ball" - collected by Colm O'Lochlainn from a ballad singer in Thomas Street in 1913; melody, called "It was in Dublin city", is in the Petrie collection (1855). Luke Cheevers said it, and a follow-up, "The Ragman's Wake", was written by Tommy Winters, who died in WW1. Recorded by Frank Harte, The Dubliners.
- "The Rocky Road to Dublin" - a rollicking song written by Galwayman D. K. Gavan for music-hall artist Harry Clifton around 1863.
- "Lannigan's Ball" - written by Galwayman D. K. Gavan for popular music-hall artist Harry Clifton around 1863.
- "Dublin Jack of All Trades" - a broadside ballad from the 1860s recorded by The Johnstons, among others.
- "Tied my Toes to the Bed", c. 1870
- "The New Tramway", on the new horse tramway of the Dublin Tramway Company, 1872.
- "Waxies' Dargle" - about the annual outing to Ringsend by Dublin cobblers (waxies).

== 1900 - 1950 ==
- "The Pride of Pimlico" - a song about the Dublin Liberties written by Arthur Griffith.
- "The Cruise of the Calabar" - a comical song about a canal barge by Arthur Griffith
- "Twenty Men From Dublin Town" - written by Arthur Griffith, recorded by Danny Doyle
- "Down by the Liffeyside (Fish and Chips)" - written by Peadar Kearney
- "Dying Rebel" - a song about the aftermath of the 1916 Rising in Dublin
- "Easy and Slow" - a song of somewhat constant innuendo set in Dublin's Liberties
- "Biddy Mulligan the Pride of the Coombe" - written by Seamas Kavanagh about a Dublin street-seller, made popular by Jimmy O'Dea.
- "Kevin Barry" - about young medical student and Irish revolutionary Kevin Barry controversially executed during the Irish War of Independence
- "The Foggy Dew" - about the Easter Rising of 1916, written by Canon Charles O’Neill in 1919.
- "The Row in the Town" - a song written by Peadar Kearney commemorating the 1916 Rising.
- "Dublin City 1913" - the struggle from 1913 to 1916, written by Donagh MacDonagh
- "Arbour Hill" - written by Declan Hunt about the burial place of the Easter 1916 Leaders.

== 1950 - 2000 ==
- "The Auld Triangle" - by writer Brendan Behan, about his time in Mountjoy Prison
- "The Burning of the Abbey Theatre" - a comical song about the Abbey Theatre by Sylvester Gaffney (Leo Maguire).
- "Three Lovely Lasses from Kimmage" - a comical song by Sylvester Gaffney (Leo Maguire).
- "Dublin Me Darlin'" - written by Sylvester Gaffney (Leo Maguire), recorded by Danny Doyle.
- "Monto (Take Her Up To Monto)" - a song by George Hodnett about the famous red-light district around Montgomery Street in Dublin.
- "On Raglan Road" - Patrick Kavanagh poem to the 19th-century melody "The Dawning of the Day"
- "The Ferryman" - about the ferries on the River Liffey, by Pete St. John.
- "Ringsend Rose" - about a girl from Ringsend, written by Pete St. John.
- "Summer in Dublin" - written by Liam Reilly and recorded by Bagatelle
- "Anne Devlin" - about Robert Emmet's sweetheart, by Pete St John
- "Mother Redcaps" - song by Pete St John about a cherished music pub in the Dublin Liberties, closed in 2005
- "Danny Farrell" - a song about a traveller, by Pete St John, recorded by The Dubliners
- "Rosie Up in Moore Street" - about a Dublin street dealer, by Pete St John
- "Dicey Riley" - Dublin song about a woman who enjoys her little drop, with verses by Dominic Behan and Tom Munnelly
- "The Zoological Gardens" - by Dominic Behan about Dublin Zoo
- "Come Out Ye Black and Tans" - British Army-taunting song written by Dominic Behan
- "The Mero" - a song about a former cinema in Mary St., Dublin, popular with children, by Pete St. John
- "Johnie McGory" - a song about children, by Pete St John, recorded by The Dubliners
- "Ringsend Boatman" - by Pete St John
- "The Maid From Cabra West" - an Irish version of an English song, sung by Frank Harte
- "Dublin in my Tears" - written by Dubliner Brendan Phelan and recorded by the Dublin City Ramblers.
- "Dublin in the Rare Old Times" - 1980s song about Dublin before the 1960s (composer: Pete St. John)
- "Grace" - written in 1985 by Frank and Seán O'Meara about Grace Gifford; recorded by Jim McCann, Anthony Kearns, the Wolfe Tones and others.
- "Christchurch Bells" - a song about a summer night in Dublin, sung by The Hothouse Flowers

== Since 2000 ==
- "800 Voices" - about the Artane Industrial school, written and recorded by Danny Ellis
- "The Bold Christian Brothers" - about the Artane Industrial school, written and recorded by Danny Ellis
- "The Ballad of Ronnie Drew - by U2, the Dubliners and others; #1 in March 2008

== See also ==
- Music of Ireland
