= Lee National Denim Day =

Fundraiser event

Lee National Denim Day is a fundraiser created by Lee Jeans to support the women's cancer programs of the Entertainment Industry Foundation. Every year, people are asked to donate the money they would spend on a pair of jeans to support breast cancer research and wellness programs. The beneficiary of the program is the American Cancer Society. It is celebrated on the first Friday of October.

== Program history ==
Lee National Denim Day has raised more than $83 million in the fight against breast cancer. In 2008, an estimated 800,000 individuals wore denim on Lee National Denim Day.

== Celebrity spokespersons ==
- 1996 – Professional Basketball player Rebecca Lobo, whose mother is a breast cancer survivor.
- 1998 – Actress Yasmine Bleeth, who played Caroline Holden on the TV show Baywatch. Bleeth's mother died from inflammatory breast cancer when Bleeth was 20 years old.
- 1999 – Actress Patricia Arquette, who played the psychic Allison DuBois on the TV show Medium. Arquette's mother died from breast cancer in 1997.
- 2000 – Actor Rob Lowe, who later played Sam Seaborn in the TV show The West Wing, was the first male spokesperson for the Lee National Denim Day. His grandmother and great-grandmother both suffered from breast cancer.
- 2001 – Actress Lucy Liu, co-star in the film Charlie's Angels and on TV's Ally McBeal. Liu was once diagnosed with a non-cancerous breast lump.
- 2002 – Actress Melina Kanakaredes, star of CSI: NY as Detective Stella Bonasera. A friend of hers was diagnosed with breast cancer.
- 2003 – Actress Christina Applegate, who played Kelly Bundy on the sitcom Married... with Children. Applegate and her mother, Nancy Priddy, are both breast cancer survivors.
- 2004 – Actor Charlie Sheen, of the TV show Two and a Half Men. A close friend of his lost her life to breast cancer and Sheen wanted to help find a cure for the disease.
- 2005 – Actors James Denton and Ricardo Antonio Chavira, stars of the TV show Desperate Housewives, helped raise $8.5 million. The mothers of both actors lost their lives to breast cancer.
- 2006 – Actor Pierce Brosnan, who played British spy James Bond. Brosnan's first wife, Australian actress Cassandra Harris, died due to ovarian cancer, and he has been a cancer research advocate ever since.
- 2007 – Actress Mariska Hargitay, who plays detective Olivia Benson on Law & Order: SVU. Her childhood friend died of breast cancer in Spring 2007. Billy Ray Cyrus, and actresses Gabrielle Union and Kerry Washington also supported the campaign.
- 2008 – Actors Chandra Wilson, who plays Dr. Miranda Bailey on Grey's Anatomy, and Tim Daly, who plays Dr. Pete Wilder on Private Practice, joined the campaign in support of loved ones who have struggled with the disease.
- 2009 – Actress Christina Applegate, program ambassador in 2003, announced in May 2009 she was returning to support the campaign after suffering from breast cancer herself in 2008.
- 2010 - Actress Felicity Huffman, who plays Lynnette Scavo on Desperate Housewives, joined the campaign in support of loved ones who have struggled with the disease.
- 2011 - Mike Rowe, creator, host and executive producer of Dirty Jobs with Mike Rowe. His mother, Peggy, was diagnosed with breast cancer.
- 2012 - no celebrity spokesperson for 2012
- 2013 - no celebrity spokesperson for 2013.

== Related observances ==
In Chattanooga, Tennessee there is an annual burger week to celebrate Southern culture.

In Canada, National Denim Day is organized by the CURE Foundation, and is held in May, rather than October.
