= Irish DreamTime =

Production company

Irish DreamTime is a production company founded by actor Pierce Brosnan and his partner Beau St. Clair.

After many of the names he considered for the production company were already taken, Brosnan recalled the Australian Aborigines' concept of Dreamtime and adapted that into the company name.

== Films ==
Year	Title
1998	The Nephew
1999	The Match
1999	The Thomas Crown Affair
2002	Evelyn
2004	Laws of Attraction
2005	The Matador
2007	Shattered
2009	The Greatest
2014	The November Man
2015	Some Kind of Beautiful
2016	I.T.
