= The Greatest (2009 film) =

2009 film by Shana Feste

- Theatrical release poster
- Directed by: Shana Feste
- Written by: Shana Feste
- Produced by: Lynette Howell; Beau St. Clair
- Starring: Pierce Brosnan; Susan Sarandon; Carey Mulligan
- Cinematography: John Bailey
- Edited by: Cara Silverman
- Music by: Christophe Beck
- Production companies: Barbarian Film Group; Oceana Media Finance; Silverwood Films; Irish DreamTime
- Distributed by: Paladin
- Release dates: January 17, 2009 (Sundance); April 2, 2010 (United States)
- Running time: 98 minutes
- Country: United States
- Language: English
- Budget: $6 million
- Box office: $985,181

The Greatest is a 2009 American drama film written and directed by Shana Feste in her directorial debut, and starring Pierce Brosnan, Susan Sarandon, Carey Mulligan, and Michael Shannon.

== Plot ==
Eighteen-year-old Bennett Brewer and Rose have sex together, the only time either of them have ever done so. When Bennett is killed when a truck crashes into his car while he is parked in the middle of the road at night, his family feel like they cannot go on. His mother Grace and his father Allen get an unexpected visitor knocking at their door; it turns out to be Rose, who is pregnant with Bennett's child. As the story develops, Bennett's younger brother Ryan is introduced and he is grieving the fact he did not say a final good bye to his brother. One sees the true relationships of the family as the story comes together, Grace waits at the bed of Jordan Walker, the man driving the truck which collided with Bennett's car in the crash. She is waiting for him to wake so she can ask him what occurred during the 17 minutes between the crash and his death. After a while, she finds out the truth, but is disappointed with what she hears. In the last moments, Bennett was not calling for his mother – he was calling to Rose asking Walker to make sure that she was safe.

Allen hires a cleaner to clean the house, but when Grace finds out, she is terribly angry, claiming their son has been washed away. Allen then appears to be having a heart attack, whilst Grace carries on shouting until she realises what is happening. At the hospital bed, shortly after Grace returns from finding out about Bennett's final minutes, Allen breaks down crying, saying that he had been holding in all his grief and upset, and that he could have done something to prevent the crash and his son's death.

Meanwhile, Rose has overheard Grace saying Rose should have died instead of Bennett, so she leaves and seeks the help of her own mother. She soon realises that all her mother is bothered about is trying to get money from the Brewers, claiming it will help her. The Brewers try to find Rose and they find her in labor and persuade her to go to the hospital and, while in the car on the way, she seeks to find out everything about Bennett she did not already know.

When film draws to a close, one sees Rose and the baby, a girl called Ruby, Grace's favourite girl's name. The film ends with the moment Bennett spoke to Rose earlier on the day he died.

== Cast ==
- Pierce Brosnan as Allen Brewer
- Susan Sarandon as Grace Brewer
- Carey Mulligan as Rose
- Johnny Simmons as Ryan Brewer
- Aaron Taylor-Johnson as Bennett Brewer
- Zoë Kravitz as Ashley
- Jennifer Ehle as Joan
- Amy Morton as Lydia
- Michael Shannon as Jordan Walker

== Production ==
=== Development ===
Feste received the help of Creative Artists Agency (CAA) director Richard Lovett, for whom she had been working as an assistant in the past. The CAA sent Pierce Brosnan's producing partner, Beau St. Clair, the script and she convinced him to read it. Shortly after, Susan Sarandon joined the film, convinced by Brosnan.

=== Casting ===
Feste met with a lot of actresses for Carey Mulligan's role but ultimately Mulligan stood out. It was Feste's directorial debut. To gain the confidence of investors and producers, she made a scrapbook which contained her ideas on tone, camera movement, color, space and lines.

=== Filming ===
Principal photography took place in Rockland County, New York. The film was shot in 35 mm format.

== Release ==
The film screened at the 2009 Sundance Film Festival. Another film starring Mulligan, the Oscar-nominated An Education, also screened at the festival.

== Reception ==
On the review aggregator website Rotten Tomatoes, 55% of 58 critics' reviews are positive, with an average rating of 5.5/10. The website's consensus reads: "It's burdened by a predictable, overly melodramatic story, but The Greatest benefits from strong performances by its talented cast." On Metacritic, which uses a weighted average, the film holds a score of 45 out of 100 based on 17 critics, indicating "mixed or average" reviews.
