= Desmond Doyle =

Irish painter and pianist (1924–1986)

Desmond Doyle (1924–1986) was an Irish painter and professional pianist, whose children (Evelyn, Maurice, Noel, John, Kevin, and Dermot) were taken into the custody of the Irish NSPCC (the forerunner of the Irish Society for the Prevention of Cruelty to Children (ISPCC)).

== Background ==
On Boxing Day one year, Charlotte Doyle got on a bus with a cousin and left her six children behind.

The children were placed in an industrial school, where their father found them upon returning from job seeking in London. Evelyn was sent to High Park Convent. Her five brothers were sent to the Boys Industrial School.

Doyle left to find work in England to earn enough money to set up a home for his children. While there, he met Jessie Powers (née Cunningham), who was his landlady and who later accompanied him back to Ireland.

Upon returning in 1955, the State refused to give his children back without written permission from both the father and mother. Since the mother could not be located, the wishes of one parent acting alone did not count and the law stated they would not be released until they reached the age of 16.

== Campaign to return children to him ==
Upon his return to his homeland in the autumn of 1954, Doyle petitioned for the return of his children. Nevertheless, the government denied his request, citing the best interests of the children. He subsequently fought a legal battle to regain custody of them, which required overturning the provisions of the Irish Children Act, 1941. This law prevented a father from caring for his own children in the absence of their mother if she was living unless she gave written permission for him to do so. Doyle became involved in a case presented before the Irish Supreme Court in which it was claimed that the Children's Act contravened several sections of the Irish Constitution. In December 1955, the Supreme Court ruled in favor of Desmond Doyle, and ordered that the children be returned to him and that his court costs were to be reimbursed by the government.

== Controversy ==
Years later, the oldest Doyle, Evelyn, contacted her birth mother. She had remarried the cousin and started a second family. Charlotte described Desmond as abusive and an alcoholic, giving examples of him engaging in violent burst of aggression, sexual assaults and tirades. Half-siblings remembered being told Charlotte left that day after a violent episode and in fear for her life, she ran out of the building; a stark contrast to Evelyn's memory of Charlotte walking calmly out the door and across the street. Ann Walsh, daughter of Charlotte, from the second family, recounted an occasion Desmond beat her mother unconscious and had to throw cold water over her to bring her round. Three of the Doyle siblings conceded with the memory that their mother had been beaten. In her second memoir, Evelyn admitted her father was an alcoholic and remembered loud arguments between her parents but said: " ... everyone in the flats shouted and roared at each other.". Evelyn also admitted to frequently attempting to run away when growing up and recalling one instance of her father hitting her until she was too weak to get off the floor when he thought she had shoplifted.

== Written accounts ==
The events leading up to the Supreme Court's decision were recounted in the book Evelyn: A True Story. The story was also published as Tea and Green Ribbons: A Memoir (2003, Free Press, New York). Her sequel describing the Doyles' life and Evelyn's life after the Supreme Court decision was published as Nothing Green: The Sequel to the Bestselling "Evelyn" (2004, Orion Publishing Group, London).

== Film based on events ==
A highly fictionalised account of these events has been recorded in the film Evelyn (2002), starring Pierce Brosnan (who plays Desmond), Julianna Margulies, Sophie Vavasseur, Stephen Rea, Aidan Quinn and Alan Bates and directed by Bruce Beresford. The film only showed three children, Evelyn and two brothers (Maurice and Dermot), instead of all six of the real-life family's children, and involved no period in England or Jessie Powers.
