= The Nephew =

- Directed by: Eugene Brady
- Written by: Eugene Brady
- Produced by: Jerry A. Baerwitz; Pierce Brosnan; Doug Mayfield
- Starring: Donal McCann; Pierce Brosnan; Hill Harper; Aislín McGuckin; Niall Toibin
- Music by: Stephen McKeon
- Distributed by: United International Pictures
- Release date: August 28, 1998
- Running time: 106 minutes
- Country: Ireland
- Language: English
- Box office: £241,000 (UK/Ireland)

The Nephew is a 1998 Irish film directed by Eugene Brady, which tells the story of a young biracial American man, Chad Egan-Washington (played by Hill Harper).

== Plot ==
Following the death of his father, and later his mother, a long time Irish immigrant to the United States, the teenage and biracial Chad travels from his home in New York to a small Irish island where his mother was brought up, to live with his uncle, a smalltime farmer.

In addition to facing initial prejudices, Chad finds himself the center of a grievance his uncle Tony (Donal McCann) holds against local bar owner Joe Brady (Pierce Brosnan), for his illicit relationship with Chad's mother, which Tony opposed, before she left twenty years before.

Further complications ensue when Chad develops a relationship with Brady's daughter Aislinn (Aislin McGuckin). Her admirer Peter O'Boyce (David Quinn), who works in her father's bar, is jealous and attempts to stop the ensuing romance.

== Production ==
The Nephew was the first film released by Irish DreamTime, a production company which had been founded by Pierce Brosnan and film producer Beau St. Clair in 1996.

Locations in Ireland used for shooting The Nephew included Roundwood, Wicklow Town, Wicklow Head. A large prop Cromlech was built for the movie.

== Reception ==
The film grossed £241,000 ($0.4 million) in the United Kingdom and Ireland.
