= I.T. (film) =

- Theatrical release poster
- Directed by: John Moore
- Screenplay by: Dan Kay; William Wisher
- Story by: Dan Kay; David T. Friendly (uncredited)
- Produced by: David T. Friendly; Beau St. Clair; Nicolas Chartier; Craig J. Flores
- Starring: Pierce Brosnan; James Frecheville; Anna Friel; Stefanie Scott; Michael Nyqvist
- Cinematography: Ekkehart Pollack
- Edited by: Ivan Andrijanic
- Music by: Timothy Williams
- Production companies: Voltage Pictures; Friendly Films; Irish DreamTime; Mutressa Movies
- Distributed by: RLJ Entertainment (United States); Signature Entertainment (Ireland)
- Release date: September 23, 2016 (United States)
- Running time: 96 minutes
- Countries: United States; Ireland; France; Denmark
- Language: English
- Budget: €11.2 million
- Box office: $2.1 million

I.T. is a 2016 thriller film directed by John Moore and written by Dan Kay and William Wisher. It stars Pierce Brosnan, James Frecheville, Anna Friel, Stefanie Scott, and Michael Nyqvist and revolves around the aviation tycoon and his family who are stalked by I.T. consultant using the technology in retaliation for firing him. It was produced by David T. Friendly and Beau St. Clair, who was Brosnan's producing partner at the production company Irish DreamTime before her death. The film was released in theaters and via video on demand in the United States on September 23, 2016, by RLJ Entertainment.

== Plot ==
Mike Regan is an aviation tycoon who lives in a state-of-the-art smart house full of modern technology with his wife Rose and 17-year-old daughter Kaitlyn. His company, Regan Aviation, is developing an app called "Omni Jet" which will increase business while the company raises much-needed financial capital with a stock offering. However, it requires Securities and Exchange Commission (SEC) approval. Mike meets Ed Porter, a 28-year-old information technology consultant and calls him to fix his home's poor Wi-Fi signal. While Porter also upgrades the GPS in Mike's car, he tells that he also worked at the National Security Agency (NSA) and had taken part in a military exercise in Kandahar.

Porter meets Kaitlyn and starts a relationship with her through social media, but Mike disapproves Porter's advantage to Kaitlyn. When Kaitlyn invites Porter into the house, Mike fires Porter. This ends his promising career at the company. Devastated, Porter begins to stalk Mike's family by taking full control of their smart house, mobile devices, and private credentials. To make matters worse, Porter sends fake emails to Mike's clients and the SEC – threatening the company's survival, records Kaitlyn masturbating in the shower, and uses an email spoofing to send Rose fake mammogram results, saying that she tested positive for breast cancer. Rose is extremely distressed until her attending physician test confirms that she is actually tested negative. Realising Porter has done this, Mike attacks and threatens to kill him if he does not stay away from his family.

Porter then uploads the video of Kaitlyn masturbating online, earning a humiliation from her schoolmates. She blames her father for installing the technology in their house. Angered, Mike drives to see Porter, but on the way Porter mockingly calls him through the car's navigation system and sends him his daughter's video. Porter then remotely deactivates the brake system, wrecking his car.

Mike requests help Henrik, an I.T. expert, who says that Mike must destroy all the smart technology in the house and delete all of their data from the computer, including bank accounts. Henrik reveals that Porter's real name is Richard Edward Portman, whose father committed suicide when he was six years old. Porter spent in protective custody when his mother became abusive towards him. Porter never worked for the NSA and the photograph of him with soldiers in Kandahar is fake.

To allow Mike to obtain evidence from Porter's apartment, Henrik creates a diversion to lure Porter out. While Porter is gone, Mike manages to get in his apartment and steal several thumb drives containing evidence, escaping just as Porter returns to his apartment after realising a ruse. When Porter realises the masked man he saw in his apartment was Mike, he hits himself in the head and frames him for assault. The police arrests Mike, who provides the evidence from the thumb drives to the police.

After being released, Mike returns home to find Kaitlyn and Rose tied and gagged by Porter, who holds them at gunpoint. A struggle ensues until Mike mercilessly beats Porter and holds the gun to his chest, but Rose gets her gag off and begs Mike not to kill him.

Some time later, the company's employees applaud Mike and his family for successfully developing the app and their house has been restored.

== Cast ==
- Pierce Brosnan as Mike Regan
- James Frecheville as Richard Edward Portman / Ed Porter
- Anna Friel as Rose Regan
- Stefanie Scott as Kaitlyn Regan
- Michael Nyqvist as Henrik
- Adam Fergus as Sullivan
- Jason Barry as Patrick
- Clare-Hope Ashitey as Joan
- Eric Kofi-Abrefa as Detective Kayden
- Brian Mulvey as George
- Austin Swift as Lance

== Production ==
The film was first announced in October 2013 as a revenge thriller with Pierce Brosnan headlining the project. It was set to be financed by Voltage Pictures and directed by Stefano Sollima. In August 2014, it was revealed that John Moore had replaced Sollima as the film's director, and commissioned a complete rewrite of the script by William Wisher. Stefanie Scott was cast in April 2015 as the daughter of Brosnan's character, and that the film was to start shooting in June later that year, in Ireland. A month later (in May), it was reported that Anna Friel had joined the cast as the wife of Brosnan's character and that James Frecheville would play the young antagonist. Michael Nyqvist joined the project a few days later. It is the last film produced by Beau St. Clair before she died from cancer. Principal photography began on June 25, 2015, and concluded on July 29, 2015.

== Release ==
I.T. was first released theatrically in Bulgaria and Romania on September 9, 2016. RLJ Entertainment released the film in theaters and via video on demand in the United States on September 23, 2016. The theatrical trailer for the film debuted in August 2016.

== Reception ==
I.T. received negative reviews from critics. On the review aggregator website Rotten Tomatoes, the film has an approval rating of 9% based on 43 reviews and an average rating of 3.4 out of 10. On Metacritic, the film has a score of 27 out of 100 based on 9 reviews, indicating "generally unfavorable" reviews. Joe Leydon of Variety criticized the cliched screenplay, but gave praise to Brosnan's performance and the direction. The Guardian gave the film two out of five stars, calling it "blundering". The New York Times found little to recommend, criticizing the screenplay and execution.
