= Thomas & Friends: The Great Discovery =

2008 British film

- North American DVD cover art
- Directed by: Steve Asquith
- Written by: Sharon Miller
- Based on: Thomas & Friends by Britt Allcroft; The Railway Series by Wilbert Awdry
- Produced by: Simon Spencer
- Starring: Pierce Brosnan
- Cinematography: Terry Permane
- Edited by: Kate Buckland
- Music by: Robert Hartshorne
- Production company: HIT Entertainment
- Distributed by: HIT Entertainment
- Release date: 20 September 2008 (United Kingdom)
- Running time: 61 minutes
- Country: United Kingdom
- Language: English
- Box office: $188,317

Thomas & Friends: The Great Discovery is a 2008 British fantasy adventure film based on the children's television series Thomas & Friends created by Britt Allcroft, which in turn was based on The Railway Series by Wilbert Awdry. It is the second full-length special in the Thomas & Friends franchise, following Calling All Engines! (2005), and is the final non-computer animated production of the franchise. It stars Pierce Brosnan as a guest narrator, and it would be Brosnan's only role in the Thomas & Friends series.

The Great Discovery premiered in Leicester Square on 20 September 2008, and was followed by a limited theatrical release, before being released onto DVD on 9 September in the United States and 6 October in the United Kingdom. It was positively received by critics and grossed $188,317.

== Plot ==
As the island's annual "Sodor Day" celebration is approaching, Thomas is sent to the wharf to collect timber with Duncan, one of the island's narrow-gauge engines, who teases Thomas for not knowing his way around the hills. Duncan tricks Thomas by leading him down a path that requires crossing an old bridge. As Thomas attempts to cross the bridge, several portions fall off into the ravine below, before the bridge ultimately collapses entirely. Once he retreats from the scene, he takes an alternate path leading him to an overgrown abandoned town. Word quickly spreads across the island and eventually reaches Sir Topham Hatt, who identifies the town as Great Waterton.

Sir Topham orders a complete restoration of the town, puts Thomas in charge of the process, and orders a new tank engine named Stanley to do Thomas' usual work in his absence. While the other engines become fond of Stanley, Thomas grows increasingly jealous when he sees Stanley doing his work and getting along with the engines so well. Thomas finds Stanley in his berth at Tidmouth Sheds that night and furiously leaves to sleep elsewhere for the night. The next day, Thomas derails and rolls down an embankment; he is sent for repairs and Stanley takes over his duties, much to his chagrin. Upon being repaired, Thomas decides to play a trick on Stanley by asking him to carry a load of heavy trucks. As Stanley pulls the train, it uncouples from him and ultimately crashes into a brick standpipe tower, causing it to collapse to the ground and damage the surroundings.

When Sir Topham announces that there may be a setback in the restoration of the town, the engines are upset with Thomas and avoid talking to him as they leave for the night. While Thomas clears away some of the debris alone, he bumps into a truck that leads into an abandoned mine, which he then chases throughout it. At a set of points, the truck goes down the right track while Thomas unknowingly goes down the left. He crashes through a boarded wall and lands in a body of water, on which he floats across. The next morning, Thomas is reported missing, and Sir Topham Hatt initiates a large-scale search party to rescue Thomas. Eventually, Thomas exits the mine, falls across a ravine, and settles down at the bottom of a hill next to a set of rails, unable to move. As the engines continue searching for him, Stanley reflects on how Thomas must have felt seeing him getting along with his friends and doing his duties.

Stanley decides to venture himself to find Thomas. In doing so, Stanley stops on the tracks and blows a long and loud whistle. Thomas, hearing the whistle, musters up enough strength to blow a whistle back, which Stanley hears the whistle. Stanley finds Thomas and helps him onto the rails, but he bursts a safety valve in his boiler in the process. Reconciling with each other, Thomas uses some of Stanley's coal to bring Stanley back to Great Waterton, and word immediately spreads that Thomas has been found. After the restoration had been completed, Stanley offers Thomas the opportunity to bring the mayor of Sodor to the grand opening. While the festivities carry forward, Thomas reflects on the importance of his friends.

== Production ==
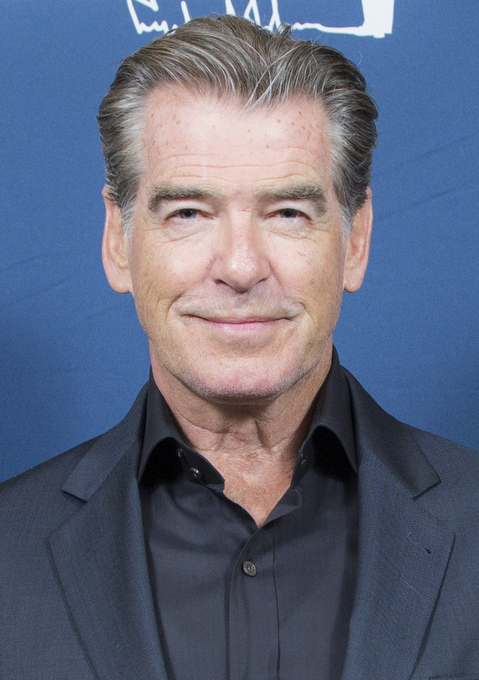
Pierce Brosnan narrates this special; this is his only role in the Thomas & Friends series.

On July 19, 2007, HIT Entertainment announced that Pierce Brosnan would be the new narrator of the series, starting with a new hour-long special titled The Great Discovery, and would be the narrator for both the British and American versions of the show, replacing previous narrators Michael Angelis in the United Kingdom, and Michael Brandon in the United States. Brosnan stated he was excited at the prospect of narrating the series he had watched with his children. HIT Entertainment's CEO, Bruce Steinberg, stated that Brosnan would be a "unique voice that children and parents around the world will recognise and trust", and credited the current narrators, Angelis and Brandon, for laying the foundation for future narrators of the show.

Filming of the special took place at Shepperton Studios in Shepperton, England, where it had been filmed since the television show's second series. It would be the last special filmed at Shepperton Studios, prior to the series' transition to computer animation in 2009.

== Release and reception ==
Thomas & Friends: The Great Discovery premiered at the Vue West End cinema in Leicester Square on 20 September 2008, and received a limited theatrical release in the United Kingdom. It was released onto DVD in the United States on 9 September, and in the United Kingdom on 6 October. Thomas & Friends: The Great Discovery grossed $188,317 at the box office.

Brosnan was praised for his narration by the media and by HIT Entertainment. Common Sense Media rated the film 4 out of 5, stating that it teaches lessons about jealousy and leadership through Thomas' adventures.
