= Lloyd Phillips =

New Zealand film producer (1949–2013)

Lloyd Phillips (14 December 1949 in Cape Town – 25 January 2013 in Los Angeles) was a South African-born New Zealand film producer.

== Biography ==
In 1980, he produced the movie The Dollar Bottom. The film received an Academy Award for Best Live Action Short Film in 1981, making Phillips the first New Zealander to win an Academy Award in any category.

Phillips was an executive producer on films such as Inglourious Basterds, The Tourist, and Man of Steel. His commercially most successful films had been Man of Steel which grossed US$649 million, Inglourious Basterds which grossed US$321 million and The Tourist which grossed US$278 million worldwide. Phillips died of a heart attack on 25 January 2013 in Malibu, California, at the age of 63. A message reading 'In Memory Of Lloyd Phillips 1949–2013' appears during the ending credits of Man of Steel.

Phillips' widow, film producer Beau St. Clair, died on January 9, 2016.
