= O'Donoghue's Opera =

O'Donoghue's Opera is an Irish 1965/1998 film starring Ronnie Drew and his bandmates in The Dubliners. The film is a mock opera, based on the ballad The Night Before Larry Was Stretched. It was shot in 1965, but was left uncompleted after the film's production ran into financial difficulties. In 1996, filmmaker Sé Merry Doyle of Loopline film oversaw its restoration, and it was first shown at the 1998 Dublin Film Festival. Producer Seamus Byrne's first job in the film industry was on this film working with the assistant director and the art director.
