= The Night Before Larry Was Stretched =

"The Night Before Larry Was Stretched" is an Irish execution ballad written in the Newgate cant.

== History ==
The song is in The Festival of Anacreon, with tune direction "To the hundreds of Drury I write." It is also listed in Colm Ó Lochlainn's Irish Street Ballads and Frank Harte's Songs of Dublin.

Donagh MacDonagh gives the following sleeve note 'One of a group of Execution Songs written in Newgate Cant or Slang Style in the 1780s, others being The Kilmainham Minuet, Luke Caffrey's Ghost and Larry's Ghost in which, as promised in the seventh stanza of the present ballad, Larry comes "in a sheet to sweet Molly"!' The Newgate Cant or Slang Style is not unique to Dublin and all the cant and slang is to be found in Partridge's A Dictionary of Slang and Unconventional English (1937). Nubbing cheat or Nubbin chit is cant for the gallows, while Darkmans is cant for night. James Joyce, working out of Thomas Dekker's The Gul's Hornbook and The Belman of London (1608), wrote:

White thy fambles, red thy gan
And thy quarrons dainty is.
Couch a hogshead with me then.
In the Darkmans clip and kiss.

Writing in "Three Centuries of Canting Songs and Slang Rhymes (1536–1896)" (published 1896), John S Farmer asserted that neither the song's date nor its author were definitely known. He gave 1816 as an approximate date, and wrote "According to the best authorities, Will Maher, a shoemaker of Waterford, wrote the song. Dr. Robert Burrowes, Dean of St. Finbar’s Cork, to whom it has been so often attributed, certainly did not." In Ballads from the Pubs of Ireland, p. 29, James N Healy attributes the song to a William Maher (Hurlfoot Bill), but doesn't note when Maher lived. However, the song is attributed to a 'Curren' in The Universal Songster, 1828, this possibly being the witty barrister John Philpot Curran or JW Curren.

== Text ==
The Newgate cant in which the song was written was a colloquial slang of 18th-century Dublin, similar to the thieves' cant still used in London (an example of the London use is seen in the 1998 film Lock, Stock and Two Smoking Barrels). This is only one of a group of execution songs written in Newgate Cant or slang style somewhere around 1780, others being The Kilmainham Minuet, Luke Caffrey's Ghost and Larry's Ghost, which, as promised in the seventh verse, "comes in a sheet to sweet Molly".

A French translation of the song called La mort de Socrate was written by Francis Sylvester Mahony, better known as "Father Prout" for Fraser's Magazine, and is also collected in Musa Pedestris, Three Centuries of Canting Songs and Slang Rhymes [1536―1896], collected and annotated by John S Farmer.

== Melody ==
The tune is not an Irish one, but stems from the first line of an English song, The Bowman Prigg's Farewell. The British Union-Catalogue of Early Music (BUCEM) lists four single sheet copies with music, all tentatively dated c 1740, and there is another copy in the Julian Marshal collection at Harvard. However, the tune To the Hundreds of Drury I write is in the ballad opera The Devil of a Duke, 1732, Air No 4 Bowman Prig is mentioned in song No 22 of the ballad opera The Fashionable Lady, 1730, but this may not be a reference to the song. "Bowman Prigg" is a cant term for a pick-purse.

The melody and first verse of To the Hundreds of Drury I Write are in John Barry Talley's Secular Music in Colonial Annapolis, 1988. The Night Before Larry Was Stretched is just possibly a reworking of, or may at least have been inspired by To the Hundreds of Drury.

== Recordings ==
- The song provides the narrative basis for the film O'Donoghue's Opera, filmed in 1965 with members of The Dubliners; "The Night Before Larry was Stretched" was performed by Johnny Moynihan.
- The song was recorded by Frank Harte for the album Dublin Street Songs (1967). As in this recording, the last line of each verse is often performed spoken for effect.
- Elvis Costello recorded the song for 1996's Common Ground – Voices of Modern Irish Music.
- Recorded by The Wolfe Tones for Irish to the Core (CD-S-52033).

== See also ==
- List of Irish ballads
- List of songs about Dublin
