= Laws of Attraction =

- Theatrical release poster
- Directed by: Peter Howitt
- Screenplay by: Robert Harling; Aline Brosh McKenna
- Story by: Aline Brosh McKenna
- Produced by: David T. Friendly; Marc Turtletaub; Beau St. Clair; Julie Durk; David Bergstein
- Starring: Pierce Brosnan; Julianne Moore; Michael Sheen; Parker Posey; Nora Dunn; Frances Fisher
- Cinematography: Adrian Biddle
- Edited by: Tony Lawson
- Music by: Edward Shearmur
- Production companies: Mobius Pictures; Stratus Film Company; MHF Zweite Academy Film; Intermedia; Initial Entertainment Group; Deep River Productions; Irish DreamTime; Fern Valley Limited
- Distributed by: Entertainment Film Distributors (United Kingdom); Universum Film (Germany); Initial Entertainment Group (Overseas); New Line Cinema (United States)
- Release dates: 4 April 2004 (Phoenix); 30 April 2004 (US); 7 May 2004 (Ireland/UK); 7 June 2005 (Germany)
- Running time: 90 minutes
- Countries: Ireland; United Kingdom; Germany
- Language: English
- Budget: $32 million
- Box office: $30 million

Laws of Attraction is a 2004 romantic comedy film directed by Peter Howitt, based on a story by Aline Brosh McKenna and screenplay by Robert Harling and McKenna. It stars Pierce Brosnan and Julianne Moore. In the film, NYC divorce attorneys Audrey Woods and Daniel Rafferty find love amidst a sea of litigation despite being polar opposites.

The film was released in the US on April 30, 2004 to mostly unfavorable reviews and failed to recover its budget.

== Plot ==
Divorce attorneys Audrey Woods and Daniel Rafferty have seen love go wrong in many scenarios—so, how good could their own chances be? As two of the top divorce lawyers in New York, Audrey and Daniel are opposites. She practices law strictly by the book, but he seems to win by the seat of his pants, or by "cheap theatrics," as Audrey says.

Soon the two lawyers are pitted against one another in several high-profile divorce cases, including a nasty public split between rock star Thorne Jamison and his dress-designer wife, Serena. The settlement hinges on an Irish castle, Caisleán Cloiche, or "Rock Castle," that each spouse wants. Audrey and Daniel travel to Ireland to chase down depositions, and both stay in the castle.

Although Audrey, at least, is reluctant to acknowledge their mutual attraction, they find themselves attending a romantic Irish festival together. After a night of wild celebration, they wake up the next morning to discover they have wed. Audrey is shocked, though Daniel takes their apparent marriage in stride.

The pair return to New York and find news of their wedding printed on Page 6 of the New York Post the following day. Audrey suggests they maintain the semblance of a marriage for the sake of their careers. So, Daniel moves into the guest room of Audrey's apartment.

Although in the courtroom they continue to fight the Jamisons' high-profile divorce case with the gusto they have always shown, at home, they settle into domestic life together. While disposing of the trash one day, Daniel accidentally discovers some sensitive information about Audrey's client, Thorne Jamison, which he reveals in the next day's court proceedings. Feeling betrayed, Audrey demands a divorce, which Daniel agrees to give, citing his love for her.

Next, their famous clients each return to the castle in Ireland, although they are not permitted to be there because of the pending division of assets. Judge Abramovitz sends their respective counselors to Ireland to inform them of this and give them a deadline to return or have their case thrown out. However, on arrival they discover the celebrity couple has reconciled on the seventh anniversary of their wedding, which took place at the castle. Audrey and Daniel then learn that the "priest" who performed their own marriage ceremony is in fact the Jamisons' butler, and the "weddings" he presided over at the festival were simply romantic gestures.

Daniel returns immediately to New York alone, but with Audrey fast on his heels, as she realizes she has fallen in love with him. Confronting him in the grocery store below Daniel's Chinatown office, she asks if he is willing to fight to save their relationship. In the romantic final scenes, the couple are married in a private ceremony in Judge Abramovitz's chambers, with Audrey's mother as the sole witness.

== Cast ==
- Pierce Brosnan as Daniel Rafferty
- Julianne Moore as Audrey Woods
- Parker Posey as Serena Jamison
- Michael Sheen as Thorne Jamison
- Frances Fisher as Sara Miller, Audrey's mother
- Nora Dunn as Judge Abramovitz
- Mike Doyle as Michael Rawson
- Allan Houston as Adamo Shandela
- Johnny Myers as Ashton Phelps
- Heather Ann Nurnberg as Leslie
- Brette Taylor as Mary Harrison
- Sara Gilbert as Gary Gadget's assistant

== Reception ==
On the review aggregator website Rotten Tomatoes, 18% of 146 critics' reviews are positive. The website's consensus reads: "A bland and forgettable copy of Adam's Rib." Metacritic, which uses a weighted average, assigned the film a score of 38 out of 100, based on 36 critics, indicating "generally unfavorable" reviews.

The film opened at No. 5 in the US box office in the weekend of 30 April 2004, raking in US$6,728,905 in its first opening weekend.
