= Come Buy My Nice Fresh Ivy =

Christmas carol

Come Buy My Nice Fresh Ivy is a Christmas carol that originated in Ireland.

The music is O'Carolan's Lament (Irish: Uaill-Cuma ui Cearballain), by Turlough O'Carolan.

The lyrics were written by John Keegan (1809–1849). They were published originally in the first edition of The Irishman of 1849

== Lyrics ==
Come, buy my nice fresh ivy, and my holly sprigs so green.
I have the finest branches that ever yet were seen.
Come buy from me, good Christians, and let me home, I pray,
That God will bless your Christmas and a happy New Year's Day

Ah, won't you buy my ivy? It's the loveliest I've seen.
Ah, won't you buy my holly? Oh you who love the green.
Do take a little branch of each, and on my knees I'll pray
That God will bless your Christmas and a happy New Year's Day.

Like many traditional or older pieces a number of versions of the lyrics exist. For example:

Come buy my nice fresh ivy,
And my holly boughts so green,
I have the fairest branches,
That ever yet were seen.

Come buy from me good Christians,
And let me home I pray,
And I'll wish you a merry Christmas time,
And a happy New Year's Day.

Ah! won't you take my ivy?
The loveliest ever seen,
Ah! won't you have my holly boughts?
All you that love the Green.

Do! take a little bunch of each
And on my knees I'll pray,
That God may bless your Christmas
And be with you New Year's Day.

These are the lyrics performed by the Cór Na Nog Rté Choir in the opening moments of the 2002 movie Evelyn. The song is not on the film's soundtrack.

Turlough O'Carolan, also called Terence Carolan, born Toirdhealbhach Ó Cearbhalláin was born in 1670, near Nobber, County Meath. He died on March 25, 1738, in Alderford, County Roscommon), one of the last Irish harpist-composers and the only one whose songs survive in both words and music in significant number.

== Alternative Titles ==
- Irish Flower Girl Song
- Irish Flower Girl's Song
- The Holly and Ivy Girl
- The Holly And The Ivy Girl
