= Aislín McGuckin =

Northern Irish actress (born 1974)

- Born: May 1974 (age 51–52); Enniskillen, County Fermanagh, Northern Ireland
- Education: Rose Bruford College
- Occupation: Actress
- Years active: 1995–present
- Notable work: Royal Shakespeare Company
- Spouse: Aidan McArdle (m. 2004; div. 2019)
- Children: 3

Aislín McGuckin (born May 1974) is a Northern Irish actress. She has appeared in theatre, television, and film roles. Her early film work includes The Nephew and The White Countess. From 2014 to 2015, she starred as Letitia MacKenzie in the Starz series Outlander, and in 2020, played Marianne's mother, Denise, in the BBC One miniseries Normal People.

== Early life ==
McGuckin was born in Enniskillen, Northern Ireland to parents Lorcan and Margaret. She grew up the eldest of three children in a Catholic family in Lurgan, County Armagh. She attended Sacred Heart Grammar School in Newry. She was going to study law at university, but changed her mind and instead pursued a degree in acting at Rose Bruford College in South East London.

== Personal life ==
McGuckin met Aidan McArdle in London through a Royal Shakespeare Company production of Richard III. They married in 2004 and have three children, Mireille, Lorcan, and Senan. The family moved to Dublin in 2015. They divorced in 2019.

== Filmography ==
=== Film ===
Year	Title	Role	Notes
1996	Trojan Eddie	Kathleen	
1998	The Nephew	Aislín Brady	
1999	David Copperfield	Emily	TV film
2005	The White Countess	Maria	
2010	The Duchess of Malfi	The Duchess	Direct-to-Video
2016	Almeida Theatre Live: Richard III	Queen Elizabeth	
2017	Oasis	Vivian Hades	TV film
2018	The Music Room	Mum	Short film
2019	The Other Lamb	Maria	
2021	The Carer	Carol	Short film
2022	Joyride	Angela	

=== Television ===
Year	Title	Role	Notes
1995	Casualty	Niamh Quinn	Episode: "When All Else Fails"
1998	The Unknown Soldier	Jenny Davis	Miniseries; 3 episodes
1998	Amongst Women	Nell	Miniseries; 2 episodes
1998–2000	The Creatives	Rhona Platt	Series regular; 12 episodes
2003–04	Heartbeat	Dr. Liz Merrick	Series regular; 46 episodes
2008–09	Holby City	Callie Taylor	Recurring role; 8 episodes
2012	New Tricks	Laura Marsh	Episode: "Queen and Country"
2014–15	Outlander	Letitia MacKenzie	Recurring role; 5 episodes
2017	Paula	Diane	Miniseries; 2 episodes
2017	Overshadowed	Mum	Miniseries; 1 episode
2017	The Miniaturist	Agnes Meermans	Miniseries; 3 episodes
2020	Normal People	Denise	Recurring role; 8 episodes
2020	Cold Courage	Toni Gallagher	Recurring role; 5 episodes
2021	Modern Love	Dr. Wyman	Episode: "A Second Embrace, with Hearts and Eyes Open"
2021	Red Election		Episode: "Series 1, Episode 7"
2022	Death in Paradise	Eve Wilding	Episode: "Series 11, Episode 6"
2023	Silent Witness	Aoife Connolly	Episode: "Series 26, Episodes 6, 7 & 8"

== Theatre credits ==
Year	Title	Role	Venue	Notes
1995	The Steward of Christendom	Dolly	Royal Court Theatre – London, Gate Theatre – Dublin & Australia/New Zealand Tour	
1999	Our Father	Emer	Almeida Theatre, London	
2000	Henry VI, Part 1	Countess of Auvergne	Swan Theatre, Stratford-upon-Avon	with Royal Shakespeare Company
2000	Henry VI, Part 2	Margery Jourdemayne	Swan Theatre, Stratford-upon-Avon	with Royal Shakespeare Company
2000	Henry VI, Part 3	Rutland	Swan Theatre, Stratford-upon-Avon	with Royal Shakespeare Company
2001	Richard III	Lady Anne Neville	Young Vic, London	with Royal Shakespeare Company
2002	The Clearing	Madeline	The Rep, Birmingham & UK Tour	with Shared Experience
2005	Twelfth Night	Olivia	Royal Shakespeare Theatre – Stratford-upon-Avon, Theatre Royal – Newcastle upon Tyne & Novello Theatre – London	with Royal Shakespeare Company
2007	Dancing at Lughnasa	Agnes Mundy	Lyric Theatre, Belfast	
2009	The Home Place	Margaret O'Donnell	Grand Opera House, Belfast	
2009	Dial M for Murder	Sheila Wendice	West Yorkshire Playhouse, Leeds & UK Tour	
2010	The Duchess of Malfi	The Duchess	Greenwich Theatre, London	
2010	Volpone	Celia	Greenwich Theatre, London	
2011	Macbeth	Lady Macbeth	Royal Shakespeare Theatre, Stratford-upon-Avon	with Royal Shakespeare Company
2011	The Homecoming	Ruth	Swan Theatre, Stratford-upon-Avon	with Royal Shakespeare Company
2013	King Lear	Goneril	Theatre Royal, Bath	
2014	Heartbreak House	Lady Ariadne Utterword	Abbey Theatre, Dublin	
2015	A Month in the Country	Natalya Petrovna	Gate Theatre, Dublin	
2015	Famished Castle	Angie	Pavilion Theatre, Dún Laoghaire	
2016	Richard III	Elizabeth	Almeida Theatre, London	
2018	Come On Home	Martina	Peacock Theatre, Dublin	
2019	Hecuba	Hecuba	Project Arts Centre, Dublin	
