= Pierce Brosnan =

Irish actor (born 1953)

Pierce Brosnan OBE
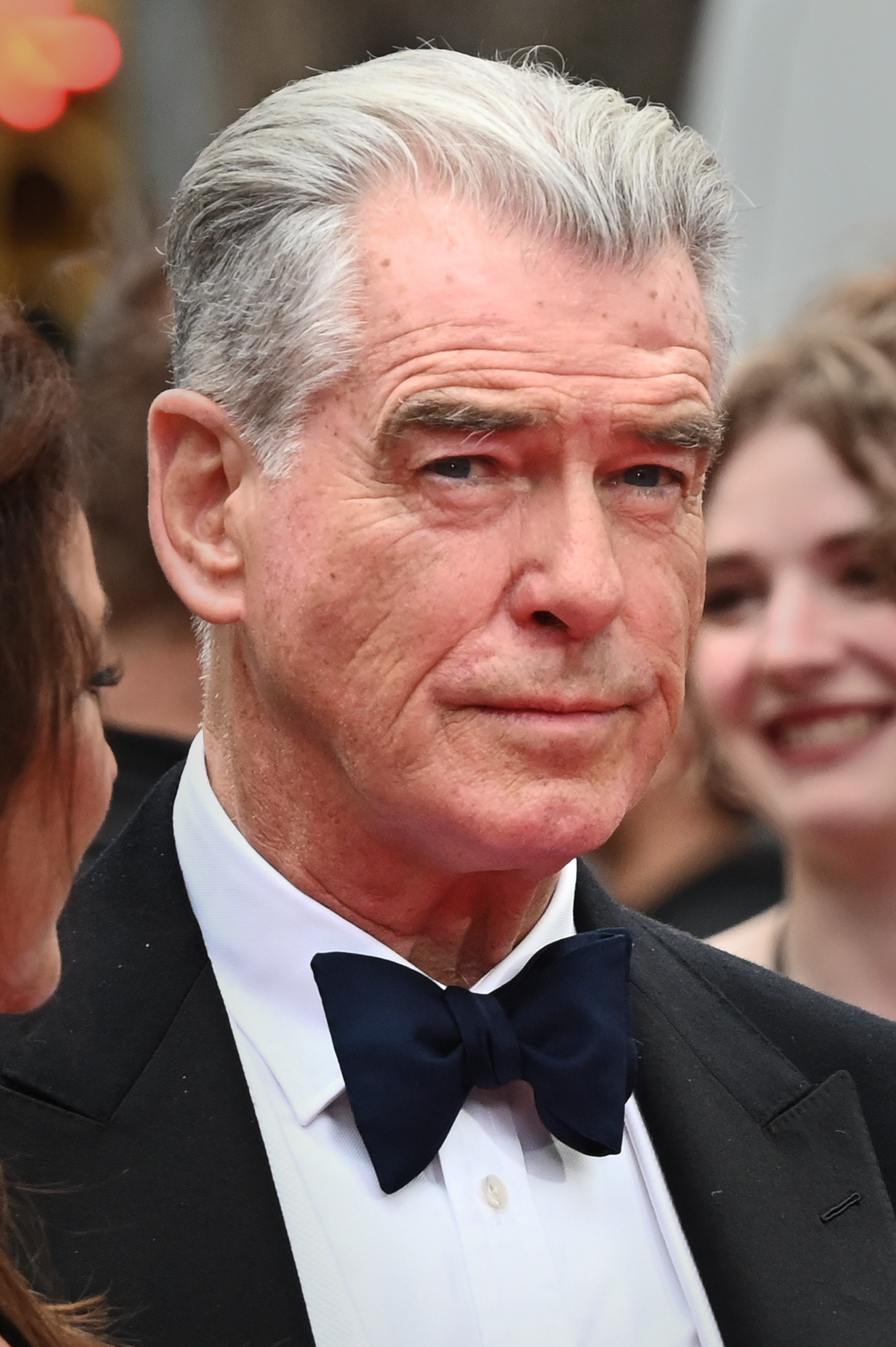
- Brosnan in 2025
- Born: Pierce Brendan Brosnan; 16 May 1953 (age 73); Drogheda, County Louth, Ireland
- Citizenship: Ireland; United States
- Education: Drama Centre London
- Occupation: Actor
- Years active: 1975–present
- Spouses: Cassandra Harris (m. 1980; died 1991); Keely Shaye Smith (m. 2001)
- Children: 5

Pierce Brendan Brosnan (born 16 May 1953) is an Irish (Note: Brosnan became an American citizen in 2004, but retains Irish citizenship and considers himself Irish.) actor. He achieved worldwide fame playing James Bond in four James Bond films from 1995 to 2002: GoldenEye (1995), Tomorrow Never Dies (1997), The World Is Not Enough (1999) and Die Another Day (2002). He has also received two Golden Globes nominations for the television series Nancy Astor (1982) and the film The Matador (2005).

After leaving school at 16, Brosnan trained in commercial illustration before attending the Drama Centre London for three years. Following a stage acting career, he rose to popularity in the television series Remington Steele (1982–1987). After the show concluded, Brosnan appeared in films, including The Fourth Protocol (1987), his break-out roles were in The Lawnmower Man (1992) and Mrs. Doubtfire (1993). Post-Bond, Brosnan top-lined other major films including Dante's Peak (1997) and the remake of The Thomas Crown Affair (1999), The Tailor of Panama (2001), Butterfly on a Wheel (2007) and has starred in The Ghost Writer (2010), Mamma Mia! (2008), its sequel Mamma Mia! Here We Go Again (2018),The November Man (2014) and Eurovision Song Contest: The Story of Fire Saga (2020). In 2022, Brosnan played Dr. Kent Nelson / Doctor Fate in the DC Extended Universe film Black Adam. Additionally, Brosnan narrated the 2008 Thomas & Friends film The Great Discovery. In 2025, he starred in the movie The Thursday Murder Club and in Ronan Bennett’s crime drama series MobLand.

In 1996, he and American film producer Beau St. Clair founded the production company Irish DreamTime. He is also known for charitable work and environmental activism. In 1997, he received a star on the Hollywood Walk of Fame for his contributions to the film industry. In 2020, he was listed at No. 15 on The Irish Times' list of the greatest Irish film actors.

== Early life ==
Pierce Brendan Brosnan was born on 16 May 1953 in Drogheda, County Louth, the only child of May Smith and Thomas Brosnan, a carpenter. For 11 years, he lived in Navan, County Meath, and said in 1999 that he considers it to be his hometown. His father abandoned the family when Brosnan was an infant. When he was four years old, his mother moved to London to work as a nurse. From then on, he was largely brought up by his maternal grandparents, Philip and Kathleen Smith. After their deaths, he lived with an aunt and then an uncle, but was subsequently sent to live in a boarding house run by a woman named Eileen. He later said, "Childhood was fairly solitary. I never knew my father. He left when I was an infant. [...] To be Irish Catholic in the 1950s, and have a marriage which was not there, a father who was not there [...] the mother, the wife suffered greatly. My mother was very courageous. She took the bold steps to go away and be a nurse in England. Basically wanting a better life for her and myself. My mother came home once a year, twice a year."

Brosnan was brought up in a Catholic family, and educated in a local school run by the De La Salle Brothers while serving as an altar boy. He left Ireland on 12 August 1964 and went to Scotland to be reunited with his mother and her new husband, William Carmichael, at their home in Longniddry. Carmichael took Brosnan to see a James Bond film for the first time (Goldfinger) at the age of 11. They later moved back to London, where Brosnan was educated at Elliott School, Putney, now known as Ark Putney Academy. When discussing his transition from Ireland to England, he said, "When you go to a very large city, a metropolis like London, as an Irish boy of 10, life suddenly moves pretty fast. [...] And you're Irish. And they make you feel it; the British have a wonderful way of doing that, and I had a certain deep sense of being an outsider." His nickname at school was simply "Irish".

After leaving school at 16, Brosnan decided to be a painter and began training in commercial illustration at Saint Martin's School of Art in London. While attending a rehearsal for a workshop at the Ovalhouse, he saw a fire eater teaching people how to eat fire and decided to join in. He trained for three years as an actor at the Drama Centre London. Describing the feeling of becoming an actor and the influence it had on his life, he said, "When I found acting, or when acting found me, it was a liberation. It was a stepping stone into another life, away from a life that I had, and acting was something I was good at, something which was appreciated. That was a great satisfaction in my life."

== Career ==
=== Early career ===
Graduating from the Drama Centre in 1975, Brosnan began working as an acting assistant stage manager at the York Theatre Royal, making his acting debut in Wait Until Dark. Within six months, he was selected by the playwright Tennessee Williams to play the role of McCabe in the British première of The Red Devil Battery Sign (billed as "Pierce Brosman"). His performance caused a stir in London and Brosnan still has the telegram sent by Williams, stating only "Thank God for you, my dear boy". In 1977, he was picked by Franco Zeffirelli to appear in the play Filumena by Eduardo De Filippo opposite Joan Plowright and Frank Finlay.

Brosnan continued his career making brief appearances in films such as The Long Good Friday (1980) and The Mirror Crack'd (1980), as well as early television performances in The Professionals, Murphy's Stroke, and Play for Today. He became a television star in the United States with his leading role in the popular miniseries Manions of America. He followed this in 1982 with the BBC's nine-part miniseries Nancy Astor (which aired in America on Masterpiece Theatre) that dramatised the life of Lady Astor, the first woman to sit in the British Parliament. His portrayal of Robert Gould Shaw II garnered him a 1985 Golden Globe Award nomination for Best Supporting Actor.

In 1982, Brosnan moved to Southern California and rose in popularity in the United States playing the title role in the NBC romantic, often-comedic detective series Remington Steele. The Washington Post noted that same year that Brosnan "could make it as a young James Bond". After Remington Steele ended in 1987, Brosnan went on to appear in, among other projects, The Fourth Protocol (1987), a Cold War thriller in which he starred alongside Michael Caine, The Deceivers, the mini-series James Clavell's Noble House (both 1988), and The Lawnmower Man (1992). In 1992, he shot a pilot for NBC called Running Wilde, playing a reporter for Auto World magazine with Jennifer Love Hewitt playing his daughter, which never aired. In 1993, he played a supporting role in the comedy film Mrs. Doubtfire. He appeared in several television films, including Victim of Love (1991), Death Train (1993) and Night Watch (1995), a spy thriller set in Hong Kong. In 2003, Brosnan was awarded the Irish Film and Television Academy Lifetime Achievement Award for his contribution to Irish Film.

=== James Bond ===
==== 1986 offer ====
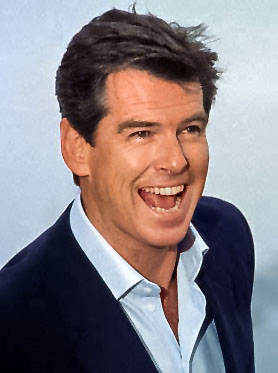
Brosnan at the 2002 Cannes Film Festival

Brosnan first met James Bond film producer Albert R. Broccoli on the sets of For Your Eyes Only, as his first wife, Cassandra Harris, had been cast as Countess Lisl von Schlaf, mistress to Milos Columbo. Broccoli said, "if he can act ... he's my guy" to inherit the role of Bond from Roger Moore. It was reported by both Entertainment Tonight and the National Enquirer that Brosnan was going to inherit another role of Moore's, that of Simon Templar in The Saint. Brosnan denied the rumours in July 1993 but added, "it's still languishing there on someone's desk in Hollywood."

In 1986, NBC cancelled Remington Steele. As Brosnan was offered the role of James Bond, the publicity improved Remington Steele's ratings and it was renewed, contractually requiring Brosnan to return to the show. This caused Eon Productions to have to look elsewhere for the new 007. The producers instead hired Timothy Dalton for The Living Daylights (1987) and Licence to Kill (1989). While Brosnan was reluctant to discuss losing the Bond role, in part because Dalton was a friend, he appeared in Diet Coke commercials portraying what the Los Angeles Times described as "a dashing Bond-like character", and NBC advertised Noble House with Brosnan dressed in a Bond-like tuxedo.

==== Being Bond ====
Legal disputes between the Bond producers and the studio over distribution rights resulted in the cancellation of a proposed third Dalton film in 1991 and put the Bond series on a hiatus for several years. After the legal issues had been resolved, Dalton decided not to return for a third film. On 7 June 1994, Brosnan was announced as the fifth actor to play Bond.

Brosnan was signed for a three-film Bond deal with the option of a fourth. The first, 1995's GoldenEye, grossed US$350 million worldwide, the fourth-highest worldwide gross of any film in 1995, making it the most successful Bond film since Moonraker (1979), adjusted for inflation. It holds a 78% rating on Rotten Tomatoes, while Metacritic holds it at 65%. In the Chicago Sun-Times, Roger Ebert gave the film 3 stars out of 4, saying that Brosnan's Bond was "somehow more sensitive, more vulnerable, more psychologically complete" than the previous ones, also commenting on Bond's "loss of innocence" since previous films. James Berardinelli described Brosnan as "a decided improvement over his immediate predecessor" with a "flair for wit to go along with his natural charm", but added that "fully one-quarter of Goldeneye is momentum-killing padding."

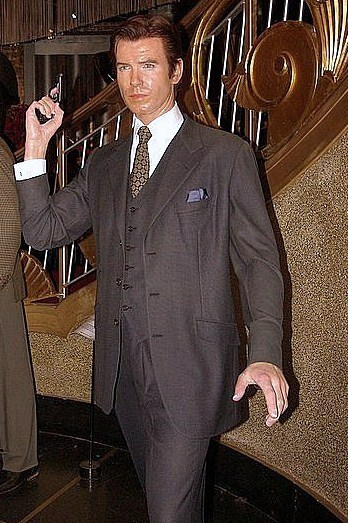
Wax figure of Brosnan as James Bond at Madame Tussauds, London

Brosnan returned as Bond in 1997's Tomorrow Never Dies, 1999's The World Is Not Enough, and 2002's Die Another Day: all three movies received mixed reviews, but were a success at the box office; Brosnan himself subsequently criticised many aspects of his fourth Bond movie. During the promotion for the fourth movie, he mentioned that he would like to continue his role as James Bond: "I'd like to do another, sure. Connery did six. Six would be a number, then never come back."

When accepting the Bond role, Brosnan asked Eon Productions to be allowed to work on other projects between Bond films. The request was granted, and for every Bond film, Brosnan appeared in at least two other mainstream films, including several he produced, playing a wide range of roles, ranging from a scientist in Tim Burton's Mars Attacks! (1996), to the title role in Grey Owl (1999), which documents the life of Englishman Archibald Stansfeld Belaney, one of Canada's first conservationists.

In 1996, Brosnan formed a film production company called Irish DreamTime along with producing partner and longtime friend Beau St. Clair. Brosnan and St. Clair released Irish DreamTime's first production, The Nephew, in 1998. One year later, the company's second studio project, The Thomas Crown Affair, was released and met both critical and box office success.

Shortly after the release of Die Another Day, the media began questioning whether or not Brosnan would reprise the role for a fifth time. At that time, Brosnan was approaching his 50th birthday. Brosnan kept in mind that both fans and critics were very unhappy with Roger Moore playing the role until the age of 57, but he was receiving popular support from both critics and the franchise fanbase for a fifth instalment. For this reason, he remained enthusiastic about reprising his role. In October 2004, Brosnan said he considered himself dismissed from the role. Although Brosnan had frequently been rumoured as still in the running to play Bond, he had denied it several times, and in February 2005 he posted on his website that he was finished with the role. Daniel Craig took over the role on 14 October 2005. In an interview with The Globe and Mail, Brosnan was asked what he thought of Craig as the new James Bond. He replied, "I'm looking forward to it like we're all looking forward to it. Daniel Craig is a great actor and he's going to do a fantastic job." He re-affirmed this support in an interview to the International Herald Tribune, stating that "[Craig's] on his way to becoming a memorable Bond." Brosnan later admitted that he was hurt by the end of his tenure; "Barbara [Broccoli] and Michael [Wilson] were on the line – 'We're so sorry.' She was crying, Michael was stoic and he said, 'You were a great James Bond. Thank you very much,' and I said, 'Thank you very much. Goodbye.' That was it. I was utterly shocked and just kicked to the kerb with the way it went down."

During his tenure as Bond, Brosnan also appeared as Bond in multiple video games, such as GoldenEye 007 (1997). In 2002, his likeness was used as the face of Bond in James Bond 007: Nightfire (voiced by Maxwell Caulfield). In 2004, Brosnan starred in the Bond game James Bond 007: Everything or Nothing, contracting for his likeness to be used as well as doing the voice-work for the character. He also starred along with Jamie Lee Curtis and Geoffrey Rush in The Tailor of Panama in 2001, and lent his voice to The Simpsons episode "Treehouse of Horror XII" as a machine.

=== 2000s ===
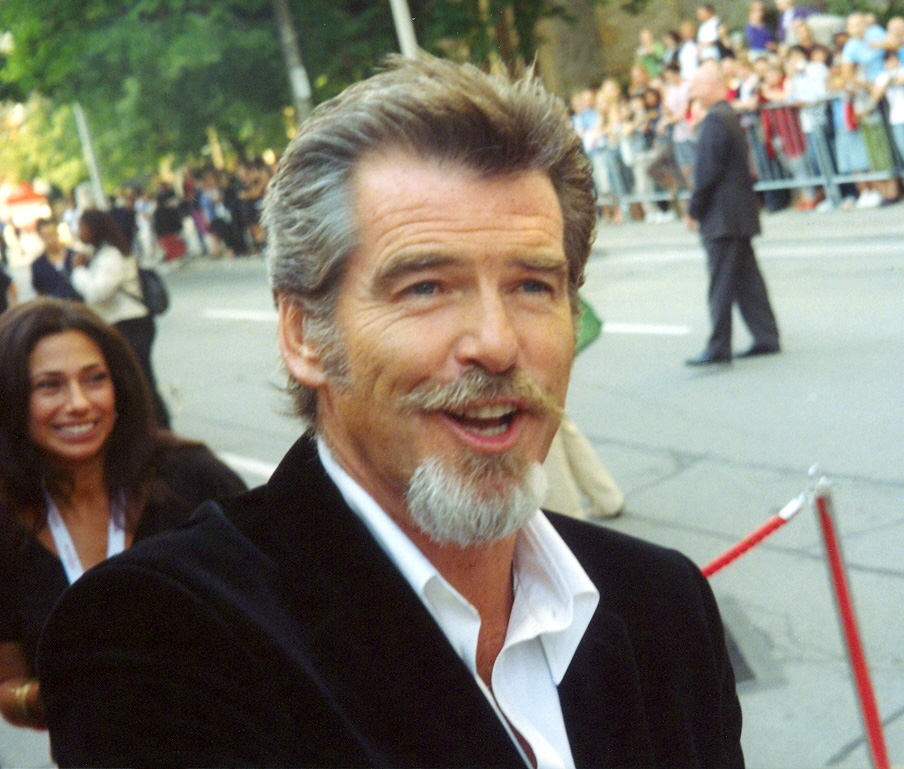
Brosnan at the 2005 Toronto International Film Festival

Since 2004, Brosnan has talked of backing a film about Caitlin Macnamara, wife of poet Dylan Thomas, the title role to be played by Miranda Richardson. Brosnan's first post-Bond role was that of Daniel Rafferty in 2004's Laws of Attraction. Garreth Murphy, of entertainment.ie, described Brosnan's performance as "surprisingly effective, gently riffing off his James Bond persona and supplementing it with a raffish energy". In the same year, Brosnan starred in After the Sunset alongside Salma Hayek and Woody Harrelson. The film received generally negative reviews and was a box office flop. Brosnan's next film was 2005's The Matador. He starred as Julian Noble, a jaded, neurotic assassin who meets a travelling salesman (Greg Kinnear) in a Mexican bar. The film garnered generally positive reviews. Roger Ebert for the Chicago Sun-Times called Brosnan's performance the best of his career. Brosnan was nominated for a Golden Globe award for Best Actor in a Musical or Comedy, but lost to Joaquin Phoenix for Walk the Line. In 2006, Brosnan narrated The Official Film of the 2006 FIFA World Cup, directed by Michael Apted.

In 2007, Brosnan appeared in the film Seraphim Falls alongside fellow Irishman Liam Neeson. The film opened in limited released on 26 January 2007 to average reviews. Kevin Crust of the Los Angeles Times noted that Brosnan and Neeson made "fine adversaries"; Michael Rechtshaffen of The Hollywood Reporter thought that they were "hard-pressed to inject some much-needed vitality into their sparse lines". During the same year, Brosnan spoke of making a western with fellow Irish actors Gabriel Byrne and Colm Meaney. In that same year Brosnan starred as Tom Ryan in Butterfly on a Wheel. The film was released in the United States under the name of Shattered and in Europe as Desperate Hours.

In 2008, Brosnan joined Meryl Streep in the film adaptation of the ABBA musical Mamma Mia!. He played Sam Carmichael, one of three men believed to be the father of Sophie (Amanda Seyfried), while Streep played Sophie's mother. Judy Craymer, producer of the film, said "Pierce brings a certain smooch factor, and we think he'll have great chemistry with Meryl in a romantic comedy." Brosnan's preparation in singing for the role included walking up and down the coast and singing karaoke to his own voice for about six weeks, followed by rehearsals in New York, which he noted "sounded dreadful". Brosnan's singing in the film was generally disparaged by critics, with his singing compared in separate reviews to the sound of a water buffalo, a donkey, and a wounded raccoon. Brosnan was a guest star narrator for the Thomas & Friends movie The Great Discovery (2008). He was originally set to narrate for both UK and US dubs from Series 12 to Series 16, but was dismissed due to the production studio found Brosnan's recordings were "weird" and "unacceptable"..

=== 2010s ===
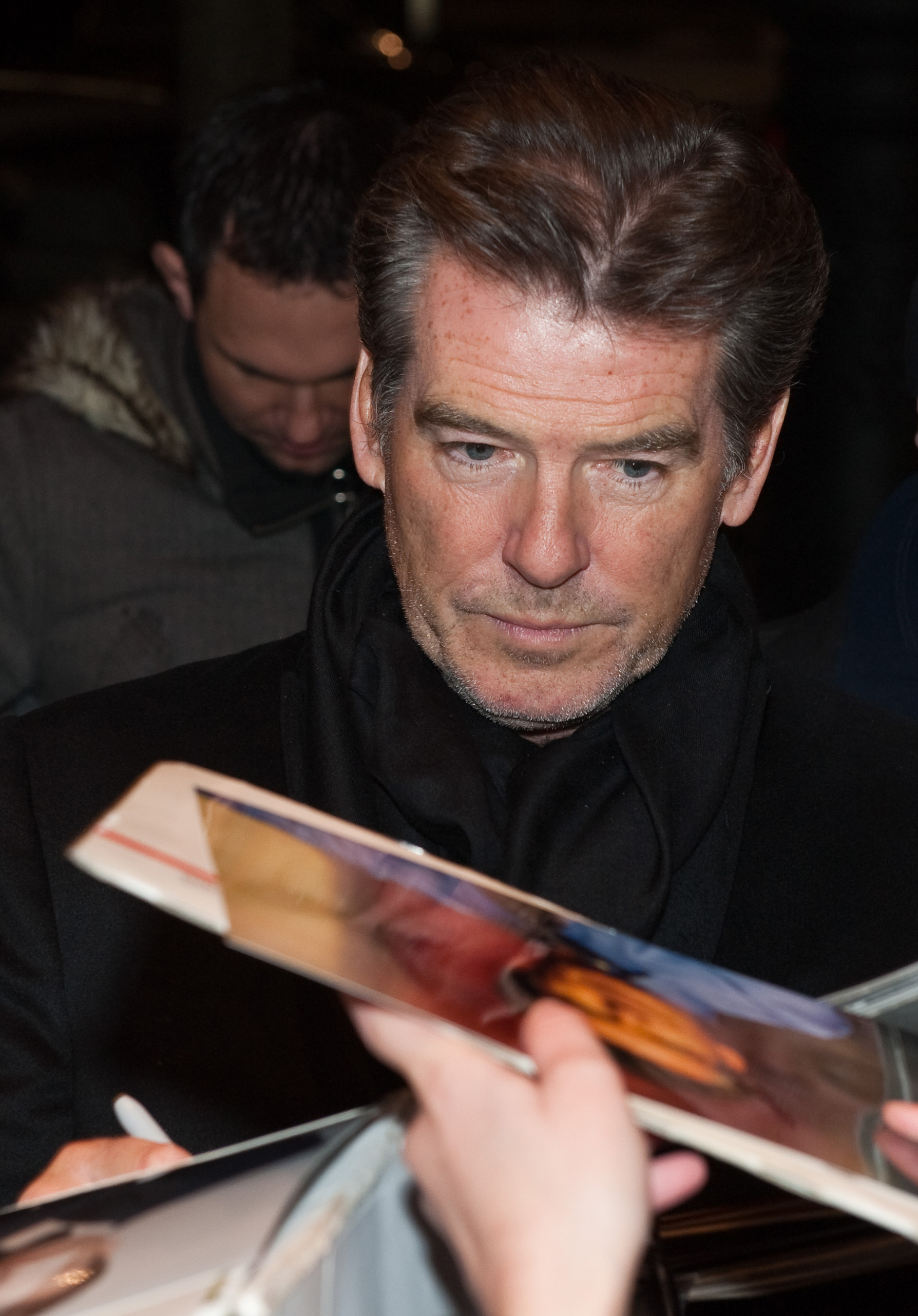
Brosnan at the 2010 Berlin Film Festival

In Roman Polanski's 2010 political thriller The Ghost Writer, Brosnan played a disgraced British Prime Minister. The film won a Silver Bear at the Berlin International Film Festival. He starred as Charles Hawkins in the film Remember Me and as Chiron in Percy Jackson & the Olympians: The Lightning Thief, both released in the same year. In 2012, Brosnan played the role of Philip in the Danish romantic comedy Love Is All You Need.

In 2013, Brosnan was awarded honorary patronage of Dublin University Players at Trinity College Dublin. He also starred opposite Owen Wilson in No Escape, playing a "heroic government agent". Brosnan was slated to star in Last Man Out, a crime film adapted from Stuart Neville's novel titled The Twelve (released as Ghosts of Belfast in the US) by Craig Ferguson and Ted Mulkerin, with director Terry Loan at the helm. However, it never came to fruition after years in development, and Brosnan is no longer attached to the production.

In 2013, Brosnan appeared in television commercials as a tongue-in-cheek version of himself to promote the launch of Sky Broadband in Ireland. In 2014, Brosnan starred in The November Man, an adaptation of Bill Granger's action novel, There Are No Spies, playing a retired CIA operative called Devereaux, alongside co-star Olga Kurylenko in a supporting role. The project had been in development limbo for almost a decade. The film was received negatively, with a 34% on Rotten Tomatoes and a 38/100 on Metacritic. In 2015, he appeared alongside Milla Jovovich in a suspense thriller movie written by Phil Shelby, called Survivor, with Charles and Irwin Winkler producing, and James McTeigue directing. Brosnan later starred in a revenge thriller called I.T. (2016), which opened in limited release through video on demand.

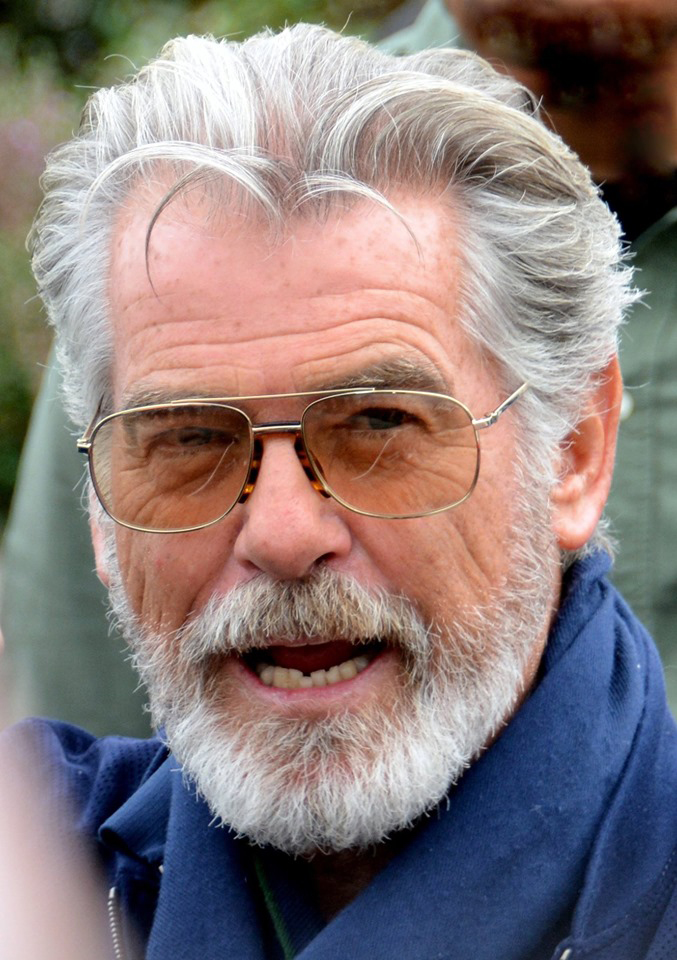
Brosnan in 2019

Brosnan replaced actor Sam Neill in the role of Eli McCullough in a television adaptation of Philipp Meyer's novel The Son, with Kevin Murphy serving as both executive producer and showrunner of the series, which aired for two seasons from 2017 to 2019. In 2017, Brosnan starred in The Foreigner, opposite Jackie Chan, as a former IRA man turned government official, Liam Hennessy. The Foreigner was filmed in London, and was directed by Martin Campbell, who previously worked with Brosnan on his debut James Bond film, GoldenEye. It was noted that Brosnan's character bore a strong resemblance to Sinn Féin leader Gerry Adams.

A third collaboration with director Martin Campbell would have seen Brosnan starring in a film adaptation of Ernest Hemingway's 1950 novel Across the River and into the Trees. However, the reluctance of investors to finance the production along with several delays led both Brosnan and Campbell to drop out of the project. Paula Ortiz was later brought on to direct the film and Liev Schreiber replaced Brosnan in the lead role.

In 2018, Brosnan co-starred with Guy Pearce and Minnie Driver in the mystery thriller Spinning Man, based on George Harrar's novel of the same name. He later reprised his role as Sam Carmichael in the sequel to Catherine Johnson's Mamma Mia!, entitled Mamma Mia! Here We Go Again, along with the rest of the cast members from the first film. He also had a supporting role in the action thriller headlined by Dave Bautista in Final Score.

=== 2020s ===
In 2021, Brosnan executive produced and starred in the heist caper entitled The Misfits directed by Renny Harlin from a screenplay by Robert Henry and Kurt Wimmer. The film was released to poor reception from critics. He also appeared in A24's horror film False Positive opposite Ilana Glazer, who co-wrote and co-produced it, as well. The film was a moderate success.

Brosnan played Doctor Fate/Kent Nelson in the 2022 DC Extended Universe film Black Adam. He joined Adam Devine in the Netflix action-comedy film The Out-Laws (2023) directed by Tyler Spindel. Also that year, Brosnan starred as King Louis XIV in the family adventure film The King's Daughter based on the 1997 novel The Moon and the Sun by Vonda N. McIntyre.

Brosnan led the 2023 hitman thriller film Fast Charlie directed by Phillip Noyce.

In 2025, he played Ron in the movie adaptation of the book The Thursday Murder Club.

== Philanthropy and activism ==
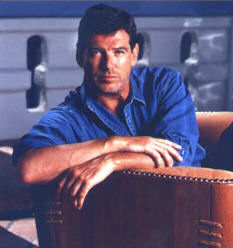
Brosnan during his time as an environmental spokesman for Pacific Green in the late 1990s

Brosnan has been an Ambassador for UNICEF Ireland since 2001—following in the footsteps of Bond actor Roger Moore, who had been a Goodwill Ambassador from 1991 until his death in 2017—and recorded a special announcement to mark the launch of UNICEF's "Unite for Children, Unite against AIDS" Campaign with Liam Neeson. Brosnan supported John Kerry in the 2004 United States presidential election and is a vocal supporter of same-sex marriage.

Brosnan first became aware of the nuclear arms race in 1962, at the age of nine, when worldwide condemnation of U.S. nuclear testing in Nevada made international headlines. During the 1990s, he participated in news conferences in Washington, D.C., to help Greenpeace draw attention to the campaign to bring an end to nuclear weapons testing with a Comprehensive Nuclear-Test-Ban Treaty. Brosnan boycotted the French premiere of GoldenEye in support of Greenpeace's protest against the French nuclear testing program.

From 1997 to 2000, Brosnan and wife Keely Shaye Smith worked with the Natural Resources Defense Council (NRDC) and International Fund for Animal Welfare (IFAW) to stop a proposed salt factory from being built at San Ignacio Lagoon. The couple with Halle Berry, Cindy Crawford, and Daryl Hannah successfully fought the Cabrillo Port Liquefied Natural Gas facility that was proposed off the coast of Malibu; the State Lands Commission eventually denied the lease to build the terminal. In May 2007, Governor Arnold Schwarzenegger vetoed the facility.

In May 2007, Brosnan and Smith donated $100,000 to help replace a playground on the Hawaiian island of Kauaʻi, where they own a house. On 7 July 2007, Brosnan presented a film at Live Earth in London; he also recorded a television advertisement for the cause.

Brosnan is also listed as a member of the Sea Shepherd Conservation Society's Board of Advisors. In 2004, he was named 'Best-dressed Environmentalist' by the Sustainable Style Foundation.

Brosnan also raises money for charitable causes through sales of his paintings. After Brosnan left school, he pursued a career in art and began working as an illustrator. "I always wanted to be an artist, a painter. I started as a Trainee Artist in a small studio in South London." A colleague suggested that Pierce attend a theatre workshop, and eventually he abandoned his artwork to pursue a career in acting. Brosnan took up painting again in the late 1980s during his first wife's illness as he found it therapeutic. "Sometimes dramatic moments affect the way you see yourself in the world…from a very hard time in my life, I started painting again and out came every colour I could imagine." Citing his influences as Pablo Picasso, Henri Matisse, Pierre Bonnard, and Wassily Kandinsky, Brosnan spends much of his free time between film shoots in front of his easel. "I am self taught, an enthusiastic painter as a friend of mine likes to say." He has continued painting since then, using spare time on set and at home. Profits from sales of giclée prints of his works are given to a trust to benefit "environmental, children's and women's health charities". Since Harris' death, Brosnan has been an advocate for cancer awareness and, in 2006, he served as spokesperson for Lee National Denim Day, a breast cancer fundraiser which raises millions of dollars and raises more money in a single day than any other breast cancer fundraiser.

In 2021, Brosnan launched his first-ever NFT collection of digital artworks entitled "Big Noise" – on a digital platform focusing on artist empowerment, sustainability, and technical innovation – inspired by his painting Earplugs, which he painted while filming the James Bond film GoldenEye, incorporating abstract movement, self-recorded sound elements, including his voice, and bespoke visuals.

== Personal life ==
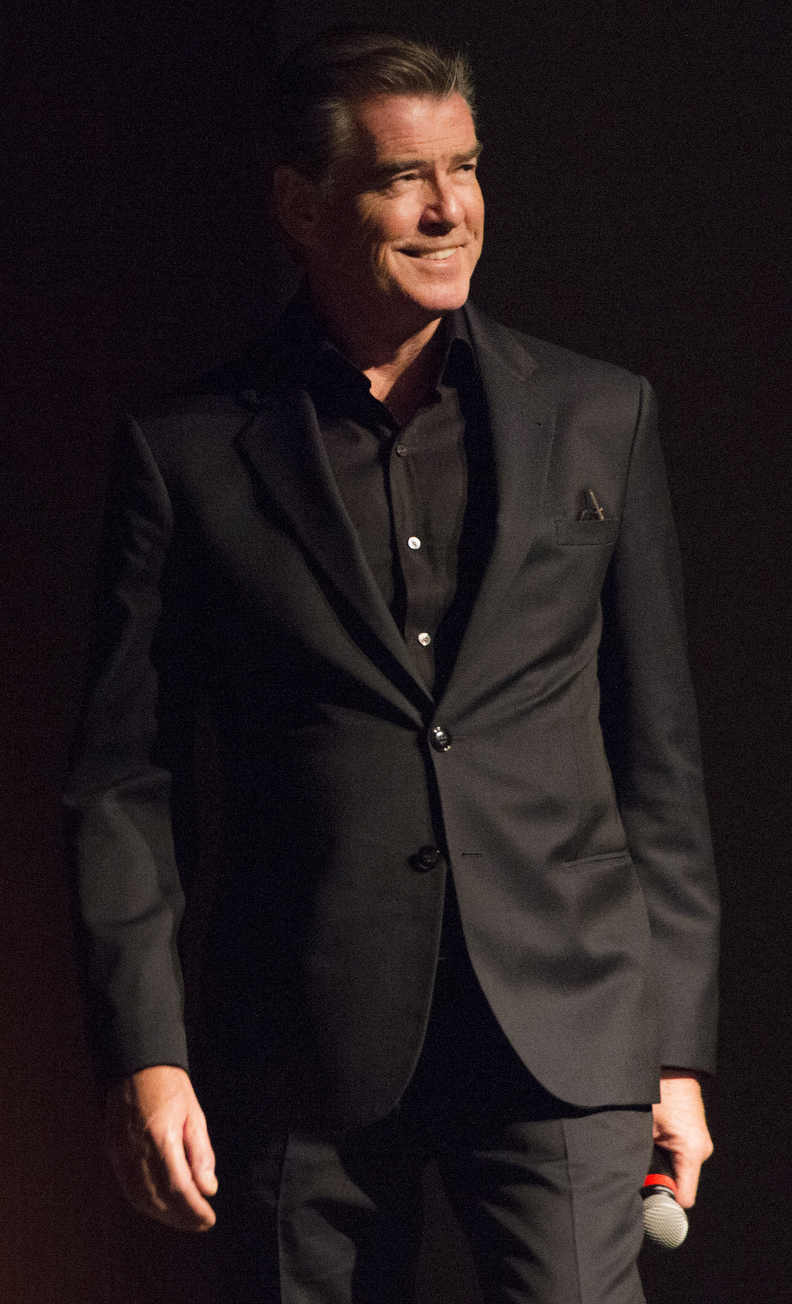
Brosnan at the LBJ Presidential Library in Austin, Texas, March 2017

Brosnan has married twice, was widowed once, and has five children and four grandchildren. He met Australian actress Cassandra Harris through David Harris, the younger brother of Richard Harris, shortly after leaving drama school. On meeting her, he said, "What a beautiful-looking woman. I never for an instant thought she was someone I'd spend 17 years of my life with. I didn't think of wooing her, or attempting to woo her; I just wanted to enjoy her beauty and who she was." They began dating and bought a house in Wimbledon. They married in December 1980 and had one son together, Sean Brosnan, who was born on 13 September 1983 and later became an actor. They also raised Harris's two children from her prior marriage, Charlotte (1971–2013) and Chris. Brosnan adopted them after their father Dermot Harris died in 1986; they subsequently took his surname. Early in their relationship, Brosnan worked in West End plays and television films. After Harris appeared in the James Bond film For Your Eyes Only in 1981, they moved to Southern California, where Brosnan was cast in the title role of the TV series Remington Steele.

An episode of Remington Steele that was filmed in Ireland generated significant publicity. This led to Brosnan meeting his father, who left when Brosnan was an infant, at his hotel. He expected to see a "very tall man" but instead described his father as "a man of medium stature, pushed-back silver hair, flinty eyes, and a twizzled jaw" who "had a very strong Kerry accent". He was regretful that they met under such public circumstances and wished for a more private arrangement.

While filming The Deceivers in Rajasthan, India in 1987, Harris became seriously ill. She was later diagnosed with ovarian cancer and died on 28 December 1991. Brosnan struggled to cope with her death:

When your partner gets cancer, then life changes. Your timetable and reference for your normal routines and the way you view life, all this changes. Because you're dealing with death. You're dealing with the possibility of death and dying. And it was that way through the chemotherapy, through the first-look operation, the second look, the third look, the fourth look, the fifth look. Cassie was very positive about life. I mean, she had the most amazing energy and outlook on life. It was and is a terrible loss, and I see it reflected, from time to time, in my children.

His adopted daughter Charlotte also died of ovarian cancer, on 28 June 2013.

In 1994, Brosnan met American journalist Keely Shaye Smith in Mexico. They were married in 2001 at Ballintubber Abbey in Ireland. They have two sons together named Dylan and Paris. They primarily live in Malibu, California, with a second American home in Hawaii. He has no permanent residences in Ireland. On 11 February 2015, the $18 million Malibu home caught fire and sustained $1 million in damages. During the 30 minutes it took firefighters to extinguish the fire, flames destroyed the contents of the garage, including Brosnan's 2002 Aston Martin V12 Vanquish, and spread to a bedroom above it; no injuries were sustained.

In July 2003, Queen Elizabeth II made Brosnan an Honorary Officer of the Order of the British Empire (OBE) for his "outstanding contribution to the British film industry". As an Irish citizen, he is only an honorary appointee of the order and ineligible to receive the full honour, which is awarded only to a citizen of the Commonwealth realms, but he is still allowed the letters "OBE" after his name. In 2002, he was also awarded an honorary degree from the Dublin Institute of Technology and, a year later, the University College Cork. On 23 September 2004, he became an American citizen while retaining his Irish citizenship. He said, "My Irishness is in everything I do. It's the spirit of who I am, as a man, an actor, a father. It's where I come from." When asked by a fan if it annoyed him when people confused his nationality because of his fairly neutral accent, he said, "It amuses me in some respects that they should confuse me with an Englishman when I'm a dyed-in-the-wool, born and bred Irishman... I don't necessarily fly under any flag, but no, it doesn't bother me."

Regarding his Catholic Christian Brothers schooling, he commented in 2013,

It always helps to have a bit of prayer in your back pocket. At the end of the day, you have to have something and for me that is God, Jesus, my Catholic upbringing, my faith ... God has been good to me. My faith has been good to me in the moments of deepest suffering, doubt and fear. It is a constant, the language of prayer. I might not have got my sums right from the Christian Brothers or might not have got the greatest learning of literature from them, but I certainly got a strapping amount of faith.

== Filmography ==
Key
†	Denotes films that have not yet been released

=== Film ===
Year	Title	Role	Notes
1980	The Long Good Friday	1st Irishman	Cameo
1980	The Mirror Crack'd	Actor playing "Jamie"	Uncredited Cameo
1986	Nomads	Jean Charles Pommier	
1987	Taffin	Mark Taffin	
1987	The Fourth Protocol	Valeri Petrofsky / James Edward Ross	
1988	The Deceivers	William Savage	
1990	Mister Johnson	Harry Rudbeck	
1992	The Lawnmower Man	Lawrence Angelo	
1992	Live Wire	Danny O'Neill	
1993	Mrs. Doubtfire	Stuart "Stu" Dunmeyer	
1993	Entangled	Garavan	
1994	Love Affair	Ken Allen	
1995	GoldenEye	James Bond	Nominated—Saturn Award for Best Actor; Nominated—MTV Movie Award for Best Fight (Shared with Famke Janssen)
1996	Mars Attacks!	Professor Donald Kessler	
1996	The Mirror Has Two Faces	Alex	
1997	Robinson Crusoe	Robinson Crusoe	
1997	Dante's Peak	Harry Dalton	
1997	Tomorrow Never Dies	James Bond	Saturn Award for Best Actor; Nominated—European Film Award for Outstanding European Achievement in World Cinema
1998	Quest for Camelot	King Arthur	Voice
1998	The Nephew	Joe Brady	Also producer
1999	Grey Owl	Archibald "Grey Owl" Belaney	
1999	The Match	John MacGhee	Also producer
1999	The Thomas Crown Affair	Thomas Crown	Also producer
1999	The World Is Not Enough	James Bond	Empire Award for Best Actor; Nominated—Golden Raspberry Award for Worst Screen Combo (Shared with Denise Richards)
2001	The Tailor of Panama	Andrew Osnard	
2002	Die Another Day	James Bond	Nominated—Saturn Award for Best Actor
2002	Evelyn	Desmond Doyle	Also producer
2004	Laws of Attraction	Daniel Rafferty	Also executive producer
2004	After the Sunset	Max Burdett	
2005	The Matador	Julian Noble	Also producer Nominated—Saturn Award for Best Actor; Nominated—Golden Globe Award for Best Actor – Motion Picture Musical or Comedy; Nominated—Irish Film & Television Award for Best Actor in a Lead Role – Film; Nominated—St. Louis Gateway Film Critics Association Award for Best Actor
2006	Seraphim Falls	Gideon	
2007	Butterfly on a Wheel	Tom Ryan	Also producer
2007	Married Life	Richard Langley	
2008	Mamma Mia!	Sam Carmichael	National Movie Award for Best Performance – Male; Golden Raspberry Award for Worst Supporting Actor
2008	Thomas & Friends: The Great Discovery	Narrator	Voice
2009	The Greatest	Allen Brewer	Also executive producer
2010	The Ghost Writer	Adam Lang	Irish Film & Television Award for Best Supporting Actor; Nominated—London Film Critics Circle Award for British Supporting Actor of the Year; Nominated—Satellite Award for Best Supporting Actor – Motion Picture
2010	Percy Jackson & the Olympians: The Lightning Thief	Chiron	
2010	Remember Me	Charles Hawkins	
2011	Salvation Boulevard	Dan Day	
2011	I Don't Know How She Does It	Jack Abelhammer	
2012	Love Is All You Need	Philip	
2013	The World's End	Guy Shephard	
2014	The Love Punch	Richard Jones	
2014	A Long Way Down	Martin Sharp	
2014	The November Man	CIA Agent Peter Devereaux	Also executive producer
2015	Some Kind of Beautiful	Richard Haig	Also producer
2015	Survivor	The Watchmaker	
2015	No Escape	Hammond	
2015	A Christmas Star	Mr. Shepherd	
2016	Urge	Daemon Sloane / The Man	
2016	I.T.	Mike Regan	Also executive producer
2017	The Only Living Boy in New York	Ethan Webb	
2017	The Foreigner	Liam Hennessy	
2018	Spinning Man	Detective Robert Malloy	
2018	Mamma Mia! Here We Go Again	Sam Carmichael	
2018	Final Score	Dimitri Belov	
2020	Eurovision Song Contest: The Story of Fire Saga	Erick Erickssong	
2021	Riverdance: The Animated Adventure	Patrick / Grandad	Voice
2021	The Misfits	Richard Pace	Also executive producer
2021	False Positive	John Hindle	
2021	Cinderella	King Rowan	
2022	The King's Daughter	King Louis XIV	
2022	Black Adam	Kent Nelson / Doctor Fate	Nominated—Irish Film & Television Award for Best Supporting Actor
2023	The Out-Laws	Billy McDermott	
2023	Fast Charlie	Charlie Swift	
2023	The Last Rifleman	Artie Crawford	
2024	Four Letters of Love	William Coughlan	
2025	Black Bag	Arthur Steiglitz	
2025	The Unholy Trinity	Gabriel Dove	
2025	The King of Kings	Pontius Pilate	Voice
2025	The Thursday Murder Club	Ron Ritchie	
2025	Giant	Brendan Ingle	
2027	Cliffhanger †	Ray Cooper	Post-production
TBA	Extraction 3 †		Filming

=== Television ===
Year	Title	Role	Notes
1979	Murphy's Stroke	Edward O'Grady	Television film
1980	Hammer House of Horror	Last Victim	Episode: "Carpathian Eagle"
1980	The Professionals	Surveillance operator	Episode: "Blood Sports"
1981	Manions of America	Rory O'Manion	Main role – 3 episodes
1982	Play for Today	Dennis	Episode: "The Silly Season"
1982	Nancy Astor	Robert Gould Shaw II	4 episodes
1982–1987	Remington Steele	Alias "Remington Steele"	Main role – 94 episodes
1988	Noble House	Ian Dunross	Main role – 4 episodes
1989	Around the World in 80 Days	Phileas Fogg	Main role – 3 episodes
1989	The Heist	Neil Skinner	Television film
1991	Murder 101	Charles Lattimore	Television film
1991	Victim of Love	Paul Tomlinson	Television film
1993	Death Train	Michael "Mike" Graham	Television film
1993	The Broken Chain	Sir William Johnson	Television film
1994	Don't Talk to Strangers	Douglas Patrick Brody	Television film
1995	Night Watch	Michael "Mike" Graham	Television film
1997	Muppets Tonight	Himself	Episode: "Pierce Brosnan"
2001	Saturday Night Live	Himself	Episode: "Pierce Brosnan/Destiny's Child"
2001	The Simpsons	Ultra House 300 as Pierce Brosnan/Himself (cameo)	Voice; Episode: "Treehouse of Horror XII"
2011	Bag of Bones	Mike Noonan	Main role – 2 episodes
2017–19	The Son	Eli McCullough	Main role – 20 episodes
2018	2019 Breakthrough Prize Ceremony	Himself (host)	Television special
2023	History's Greatest Heists With Pierce Brosnan	Himself (presenter)	Documentary; 8 episodes
2024	The Great Lillian Hall	Ty Maynard	Television film
2025–present	MobLand	Conrad Harrigan	Main role – 18 episodes

=== Video games ===
Year	Title	Role	Notes
1997	GoldenEye 007	MI6 Agent 007 James Bond	Physical likeness, archive footage
1999	Tomorrow Never Dies	MI6 Agent 007 James Bond	Physical likeness, archive footage
2000	The World Is Not Enough (Nintendo 64)	MI6 Agent 007 James Bond	Physical likeness, archive footage
2000	The World Is Not Enough (PlayStation)	MI6 Agent 007 James Bond	Physical likeness, archive footage
2000	007 Racing	MI6 Agent 007 James Bond	Physical likeness, archive footage
2002	James Bond 007: Nightfire	MI6 Agent 007 James Bond	Physical likeness
2004	James Bond 007: Everything or Nothing	MI6 Agent 007 James Bond	Physical likeness and voice

== Notes ==
Preceded by Timothy Dalton	Actor of James Bond; 1994-2005	Succeeded by Daniel Craig
