= The Matador =

- Theatrical poster
- Directed by: Richard Shepard
- Written by: Richard Shepard
- Produced by: Pierce Brosnan; Ricardo Del Río; Bryan Furst; Sean Furst; Beau St. Clair
- Starring: Pierce Brosnan; Greg Kinnear; Hope Davis; Philip Baker Hall
- Cinematography: David Tattersall
- Edited by: Carole Kravetz
- Music by: Rolfe Kent
- Production companies: The Weinstein Company; Miramax Films; Stratus Film Company; DEJ Productions; Equity Pictures; Furst Films; Irish DreamTime
- Distributed by: The Weinstein Company (North America); Miramax International (through Buena Vista International, select territories)
- Release dates: January 2005 (Sundance); December 30, 2005 (United States)
- Running time: 96 minutes
- Countries: United States; Germany; Ireland; United Kingdom
- Language: English
- Budget: $12.5 million
- Box office: $17.3 million

The Matador is a 2005 black comedy crime film written and directed by Richard Shepard, and starring Pierce Brosnan and Greg Kinnear.

The film was released on DVD on July 4, 2006, and on HD DVD on December 19, 2006. Brosnan received praise and was nominated for both a Golden Globe Award and a Saturn Award for his performance as disillusioned, unstable hitman Julian Noble.

== Plot ==
Tired businessman Danny Wright, hoping to land a career-saving contract in Mexico, meets jaded, unstable assassin Julian Noble in a Mexico City hotel bar. Julian is experiencing a mid-life crisis over the immorality of his profession, while Danny is terrified that his vital deal will fall through. After an uncomfortable conversation, Danny leaves the bar, but Julian tracks him down to apologize and invites him to a bullfight. During the event, Julian reveals the kind of work he does and, when Danny is skeptical, takes him through the steps of how to murder a portly spectator in the arena bathroom. Danny is shocked at how easily Julian can get within inches of the man, even though he ends the "tutorial" without going through with the murder.

Later, while at an outdoor cafe, Julian asks Danny to assist him in "facilitating a fatality"; Danny flatly refuses and Julian leaves. On leaving, it appears that Julian has definitively had enough of Danny. However, that evening Julian knocks on Danny's hotel room door, pleading to be let in, wanting to apologize for attempting to involve Danny in his work. Danny sits inside looking undecided, and the scene cuts to black with the sound of glass breaking, not revealing what happened next.

The film picks up again six months later, during the Christmas season. Danny and his wife, Bean, are relaxing at their home in Denver when Julian arrives, looking for a place to stay. Danny and Bean have reservations but decide to let him in. Julian is touched when he notices that Danny has framed the bullfight ticket. That night, he shares the reason for his visit: he needs help with his last job. Julian convinces Danny to go along with the plan because, he tells Danny, "you owe me." They fly to Arizona together and head to the race track. Julian gets Danny to open a door to set off the alarm so he can disable it when the time comes. He then asks Danny to bump into the target so Julian can have a clear shot. Julian is on the stairwell with a sniper rifle. Danny does his part, but Julian is unable to take the shot and breaks down. After much internal struggle and with Danny talking him through it, Julian completes the task.

On the plane back from Tucson, Julian reveals that the man he just killed was his long-term employer, Mr. Stick. Having killed him means that now Julian can retire to Greece. Danny is surprised, then amused at Julian's craftiness, but is reminded of Julian's profession when he lightly punches Julian in the shoulder and is quietly warned by Julian, "Don't ever hit me again." He immediately apologizes. A split flashback sequence during the flight home (a recollection triggered by a statement of Danny's) shows what took place a year prior when Danny let Julian into his hotel room: Danny asked Julian to kill his business opponents. Julian says no as he doesn't think Danny is that type of person and knows Danny will regret it. The flashback ends, and they are back on the plane. Danny says, " You became my friend that night, Julian. You surprised me!" Julian replies, "I surprised myself."

Later, Danny and Bean are shown visiting their son's grave, a custom they maintain on the anniversary of his death. Julian watches respectfully from a distance, places a brochure for Greece on their windshield, then slips away.

== Cast ==
- Pierce Brosnan as Julian Noble
  - Ramon Valverde as Young Julian Noble
- Greg Kinnear as Danny Wright
- Hope Davis as Carolyn "Bean" Wright
- Philip Baker Hall as Mr. Randy
- Dylan Baker as Mr. Lovell
- William Raymond as Mr. Stick
- Adam Scott as Phil Garrison
- Portia Dawson as Genevive
- Arturo Echeverria as Manila Target
- Israel Tellez as The Matador
- Guillermo Ruiz as Fat Man
- Hanny Saenz as Fat Man's Girlfriend
- Azucena Medina as Denver Fling
- Claudia Lobo as Vienna Fling
- Gabriela Goldsmith as Flirting Woman At Outdoor Cafe
- Maureen Muldoon as Australian Bar Waitress
- Carolyn Horwitz as Cantina Trista #1
- Rachel Schwartz as Cantina Trista #2
- Luz Maria Molina as School Girl

== Production ==
Although Julian travels to Vienna, Las Vegas, Moscow, Sydney, Budapest, Tucson and Manila, the film was shot entirely in Mexico City.

During the commentary for the first deleted scene on the DVD, director Richard Shepard states that the first cut of the film was 2 hours and 10 minutes and was cut down to its current length of 1 hour and 37 minutes.

== Critical reaction ==
On Rotten Tomatoes, the film holds a 75% approval rating based on 151 reviews, with an average rating of 6.9/10. The critical consensus states that "This humorously amoral, oddball comic thriller features strong performances by Pierce Brosnan and Greg Kinnear as a flamboyant, aging hit-man and an out of work suburban businessman, respectively." On Metacritic it has a score of 65% based on reviews from 36 critics, indicating "generally favorable" reviews. Audiences polled by CinemaScore gave the film an average grade of "C+" on an A+ to F scale.

Having been screened at the Sundance, Toronto International, and Chicago International film festivals prior to its release, the film was generally well received by critics. Early reviews praised Pierce Brosnan's performance, as well as the film's unique and provocative premise and themes.

Roger Ebert and Richard Roeper, on their television show At the Movies with Ebert & Roeper, gave it an enthusiastic "two thumbs up," with Ebert praising the movie as "an overlooked gem" and "Pierce Brosnan's best work to date."

=== Accolades ===
Pierce Brosnan was nominated for the Golden Globe Award for Best Actor – Motion Picture Musical or Comedy at the 63rd Golden Globe Awards, although Joaquin Phoenix ultimately won for Walk the Line (2005).

== Soundtrack ==
The soundtrack was released in 2006 on Superb Records.

Track listing

1. "Town Called Malice" – The Jam – 2:54
2. "El Matador" – Los Fabulosos Cadillacs – 4:35
3. "It's Not Unusual" – Tom Jones – 2:00
4. "1, 2, 3, 4" – Titan – 4:13
5. "Manila Fiasco" – Rolfe Kent – 2:38
6. "Garbageman" – The Cramps – 3:35
7. "Heat of the Moment" – Asia – 3:50
8. "Bahía Blanca" – Ramón Stagnaro – 3:03
9. "A Mi Guitarra" – Daniel Indart – 2:49
10. "Matador Theme" – Rolfe Kent – 2:42
11. "One Night in Mexico" – Rolfe Kent – 2:39
12. "In the Wee Small Hours of the Morning" – Dave VanNorden – 3:13
13. "No Te Rajes" – Mariachi La Estella – 3:03
14. "All These Things That I've Done" – The Killers – 5:02
