= The November Man =

2014 spy thriller film directed by Roger Donaldson

- Theatrical release poster
- Directed by: Roger Donaldson
- Screenplay by: Michael Finch; Karl Gajdusek
- Based on: There Are No Spies by Bill Granger
- Produced by: Beau St. Clair; Sriram Das
- Starring: Pierce Brosnan; Luke Bracey; Olga Kurylenko; Eliza Taylor; Caterina Scorsone; Bill Smitrovich; Will Patton
- Cinematography: Romain Lacourbas
- Edited by: John Gilbert
- Music by: Marco Beltrami
- Production companies: Irish DreamTime; SPD Films; Envision Entertainment
- Distributed by: Relativity Media (United States); Walt Disney Studios Motion Pictures (United Kingdom)
- Release date: August 27, 2014
- Running time: 108 minutes
- Countries: United States; United Kingdom
- Language: English
- Budget: $15 million
- Box office: $34.8 million

The November Man is a 2014 spy action thriller film based on the novel There Are No Spies by Bill Granger, which is the seventh installment in The November Man novel series, published in 1987. A British-American production, it stars Pierce Brosnan, Luke Bracey and Olga Kurylenko, Bill Smitrovich and Will Patton, with the screenplay written by Michael Finch and Karl Gajdusek. The film is directed by Roger Donaldson, who previously worked with Brosnan on Dante's Peak. The film was released on August 27, 2014 in the United States.

The film depicts an attempt to use photographic evidence of Russian war crimes in the Second Chechen War against a new Russian President-elect who was directly involved in the crimes.

== Plot ==
In 2008, CIA agent Peter Devereaux supervises a young operative, David Mason, during a protective mission in Montenegro. Mason disobeys Devereaux's orders not to fire. He shoots and kills an assassin but also kills a child.

In 2013, Devereaux is retired in Lausanne, Switzerland. His former boss, John Hanley, arrives and convinces him to extract Natalia Ulanova, the aide of Russian President-elect and former Army General Arkady Fedorov. Ulanova breaks into Fedorov's safe and copies old photos depicting his war crimes. She contacts the CIA extraction team, and escapes. Fedorov alerts the FSB, who pursue her through the streets of Moscow until Devereaux rescues her. She gives him a name, Mira Filipova, which he relays to Hanley. The CIA team, coordinated by Hanley, is unaware of Devereaux's presence.

The station chief, Perry Weinstein, gives the order to kill Ulanova, which Mason does. A dying Ulanova hands Devereaux her phone containing the photos. As the CIA team leaves the parking lot, Devereaux kills everyone in the squad until he faces Mason at gunpoint. The two separate without shooting. It is revealed that Devereaux and Ulanova were involved before. Hanley is detained for interrogation.

Meanwhile, The New York Times journalist Edgar Simpson tracks down refugee case worker Alice Fournier and requests her assistance to write an exposé of Fedorov's war crimes during the Second Chechen War. Alexa, an assassin, arrives in Belgrade, and finds out that Fournier will meet Simpson in a café. Devereaux also arrives in Belgrade, Serbia then heads to Hanley's house and finds Fournier as Filipova's only known contact. He arrives at the café and rescues Fournier from both Alexa and Mason's team.

Fournier says that Filipova pretended to Fedorov to be mute. She actually spoke Russian and overheard Fedorov's conversations, including the false flag conspiracy to bomb a Russian Army building to initiate war and seizure of Chechen oil fields. A former Fedorov associate, Semyon Denisov, confirms the conspiracy and reveals the CIA's involvement. Devereaux sends Fournier away.

Fedorov arrives in Belgrade for an energy conference. Fournier meets Simpson at his apartment where Alexa attacks them and kills him; but Fournier escapes. Devereaux infiltrates the CIA site where Hanley is being held; and Hanley claims Weinstein aided Fedorov and reveals that Fournier is actually Filipova. Mason also discovers the real Fournier died years ago and Filipova stole her identity. Filipova, disguised as a prostitute, goes to Fedorov's hotel room. It is revealed that during the war as a teenager, Filipova's family was murdered in front of her by Fedorov, who then held her captive as a sex slave for two years. She surprises Fedorov but is unable to kill him as he attacks her; Devereaux ascends the stairs in the Hotel, shoots the bodyguards, and saves her.

Devereaux interrogates Fedorov, demanding to know the name of the CIA operative involved in the operation. Fedorov, filmed by Filipova's phone, admits it was Hanley, not Weinstein; and Filipova confirms it. Mason arrives at the hotel but Devereaux and Filipova escape after he knocks out Mason and leaves him Fedorov's recorded confession. However, when Mason and Celia, his CIA partner, attempt to present the evidence to Weinstein, they realize that he has been replaced by Hanley.

Devereaux calls his and Ulanova's daughter, Lucy; Hanley answers the phone, having kidnapped her. Devereaux convinces Filipova to wait for him at a train station. There, she goes to a public computer to write her story regarding Fedorov. Devereaux meets with Hanley and Mason, lying that Filipova is waiting at a bus station. Mason is tasked by Hanley to recover her. Alexa finds Filipova at the station, but she escapes and knocks Alexa unconscious before finishing the exposé and sending it to the press. Hanley reveals his intention to blackmail Fedorov after he becomes the President, forcing Russia to join NATO against the Middle-East. Celia finds the kidnappers' location and informs Mason, who rescues Lucy instead. He returns and helps Devereaux kill Hanley's men and subdue Hanley. Devereaux reunites with Lucy and together they find Filipova, whereupon all three leave on the train. Later, Filipova testifies at the International Criminal Court against Fedorov, annulling his candidacy. Fedorov is then shot in the head by an unknown sniper on his yacht.

== Cast ==
- Pierce Brosnan as Agent Peter Devereaux
- Luke Bracey as Agent David Mason
- Olga Kurylenko as Alice Fournier / Mira Filipova
  - Nina Mrdja as Young Mira Filipova
- Eliza Taylor as Sarah
- Caterina Scorsone as Agent Celia
- Bill Smitrovich as Officer John Hanley
- Will Patton as Officer Perry Weinstein
- Amila Terzimehić as Alexa Demoistria
- Lazar Ristovski as General Arkady Fedorov
- Mediha Musliović as Natalia Ulanova
- Akie Kotabe as Meyers
- Patrick Kennedy as Edgar Simpson
- Miloš Timotijević as Fedorov’s Chief of Staff
- Dragan Marinković as Semyon Denisov
- Ben Willens as Agent Jones
- Tara Jevrosimović as Lucy Devereaux

== Production ==
=== Development ===
When Pierce Brosnan retired from playing the role of James Bond in 2005, it was reported that along with his then-business partner, Beau St. Clair, through their Irish DreamTime production company, he would be producing a down-to-earth spy thriller based on Bill Granger's book series, called The November Man, focusing on one particular novel in the series titled There Are No Spies, with shooting scheduled to begin in 2006. The project, however, was shelved sometime in 2007 for unknown reasons, while Brosnan held on to the screen rights to the novel with the plan to produce an adaptation in the future.

=== Pre-production ===
Eventually, in 2012, it was reported that Brosnan had the project resurrected and was put back on the trail with Dominic Cooper reportedly joining the production shortly after its announcement. In April 2013, whilst promoting his then-latest romantic comedy, Love Is All You Need, Brosnan told the media: "I am about to go off to Serbia and do my own spy movie. Finally I have the director I want in Roger Donaldson and we’re gonna do a piece called November Man so I shall jump back into that arena".

=== Casting ===
Brosnan revealed that Olga Kurylenko, who had leading roles in the James Bond film Quantum of Solace and Oblivion, would co-star alongside him, commenting "I think there’s another room on the stage for another spy! Daniel [Craig] can’t have it all to himself. My co-star is a lovely actress called Olga Kurylenko, who seems to be going through leading men like hot dinners. She started with Daniel Craig and she’s gonna end up with Brosnan! She’s a gorgeous actress, beautiful woman. She’s in and it’s the older spy, younger spy". A month later, it was announced that shooting on the film would begin on 20 May 2013, with Luke Bracey and Bill Smitrovich joining the cast. Dominic Cooper, however, left the project to star in Need For Speed, and was replaced with Bracey in the role of the main character Peter Devereaux's protégé David Mason. In June 2013, it was reported that Will Patton and Caterina Scorsone joined the cast; the former played Perry Weinstein an old-school senior CIA operative, while the latter played Celia, an "ambitious up-and-comer".

=== Filming ===
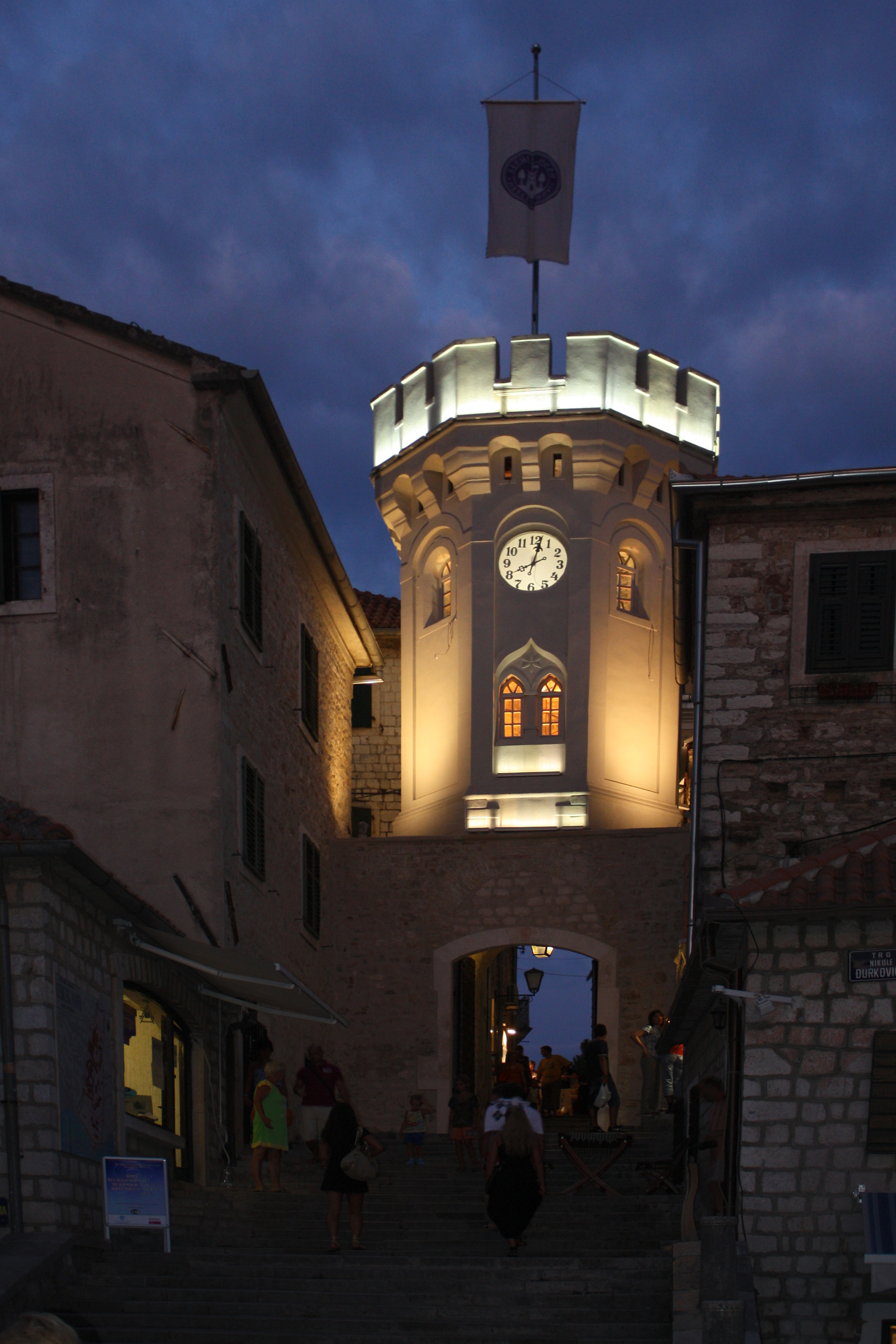
Fortress of Herceg Novi, Montenegro

Principal photography began on May 20, 2013 in Belgrade, with Brosnan, Bracey and many other supporting actors seen on site, but nothing particularly came out of the regular photographers and journalists, because it was moved away from public eye, and the sets were closed down for filming, guarded by tight security against all unauthorized personnel. In the original novel, Berlin was the main setting, but Brosnan stated that the production couldn't afford shooting there. Meanwhile, the second unit production team shot additional scenes in Montenegro locations posing as Switzerland. On June 2, 2013, Kurylenko was spotted filming an action scene with Brosnan. Production on the film officially wrapped in late July 2013, and entered its post-production phase in September, later that year.

=== Music ===
On December 3, 2013, it was announced that Marco Beltrami would be composing the soundtrack for the film. "I wanted to create a taut score incorporating a guitar theme with a slightly Eastern European meets Western motif befitting an action thriller about international espionage," said Beltrami. A soundtrack album was released by Varèse Sarabande on September 9, 2014.

Other songs featured in the film include:

- "Die This Way" by Storm Large
- "Keep It Up" by Makao
- "Gnossienne No. 3" by Erik Satie
- "Ticking Bomb" by Aloe Blacc

== Release ==
The film was released on August 27, 2014. On June 6, 2014, the first trailer for the film was released worldwide. The seventh novel in the original book series, There Are No Spies, was republished as The November Man to promote the release. The film was released on Blu-ray on November 25, 2014.

=== Box office ===
The November Man grossed $25 million in North America and $7.5 million in other territories for a worldwide total of $32.6 million, against a budget of $15 million.

In its opening weekend the film grossed $7.9 million, finishing in 6th place at the box office.

=== Reception ===
On Rotten Tomatoes, the film has an approval rating of 35%, based on 124 reviews, with an average rating of 4.7/10. The site's critical consensus reads, "The November Man has a few of the ingredients necessary for a better-than-average spy thriller, making it all the more disappointing that it falls back on dull genre clichés." On Metacritic, the film has a score of 38 out of 100, based on 32 critics, indicating "generally unfavorable reviews". On CinemaScore, audiences gave the film an average grade of "B+" on an A+ to F scale.

Bilge Ebiri of Vulture wrote, "Brosnan, who was a better James Bond than he often gets credit for, doesn’t like to smile much, but he still brings a weary likability to a grim part, just enough to keep us invested as the movie trots through its gauntlet of familiar twists and double-crosses."

== Possible sequel ==
On June 12, 2014, it was revealed that Sriram Das' production company, Das Films, had commissioned a sequel to the film. On August 20, 2014, while on The Tonight Show Starring Jimmy Fallon, Brosnan said that a sequel was in preparation, and Relativity Media would soon be entering pre-production. However, nothing further has been reported since then, and it is presumed that the project has been shelved.
