= Some Kind of Beautiful =

2015 film by Tom Vaughan

- Theatrical release poster
- Directed by: Tom Vaughan
- Written by: Matthew Newman
- Produced by: Richard Barton Lewis; Pierce Brosnan; Beau St. Clair; Kevin Frakes; Raj Brinder Singh; Remington Chase; Grant Cramer; Simon Orange
- Starring: Pierce Brosnan; Salma Hayek; Jessica Alba; Ben McKenzie; Malcolm McDowell
- Cinematography: David Tattersall
- Edited by: Matthew Friedman
- Music by: Stephen Endelman; David Newman
- Production companies: Saban Films; PalmStar Entertainment; Southpaw Entertainment; Irish DreamTime
- Distributed by: Lionsgate
- Release dates: November 6, 2014 (AFM premiere); August 21, 2015 (United States)
- Running time: 99 minutes
- Country: United States
- Language: English
- Budget: $30 million
- Box office: $6.3 million

Some Kind of Beautiful (released as How to Make Love Like an Englishman in Canada, Lessons in Love in the United Kingdom, and Teach Me Love in Europe) is a 2014 American romantic comedy film directed by Tom Vaughan, based on a screenplay by Matthew Newman. The film stars Pierce Brosnan, Salma Hayek, and Jessica Alba and was produced by Kevin Frakes and Richard Lewis.

Some Kind of Beautiful was released in the United States on August 21, 2015, by Lionsgate Premiere. A critical and commercial failure, the film was overwhelmingly panned by critics and grossed approximately $6.3 million worldwide against an estimated budget of $30 million.

== Plot ==
Richard Haig, a charismatic Cambridge literature professor, reflects on the events leading to a major turning point in his life as he speaks to his young son, Jake. Influenced by his philandering father, Gordon, Richard has long embraced a similar lifestyle, dating a series of younger women. Among them is Kate, a 25-year-old American student.

While preparing to meet Kate’s father at a hotel bar, Richard flirts with a woman who turns out to be Kate’s sister, Olivia. Their father does not show, so he sits down with the half sisters. They tell Richard about their philandering father, who was secretly a polygamist. Kate and Olivia met one day on the beach, when he foolishly had both families on the beach simultaneously but at opposite extremes.

The two form a fast friendship, agreeing to always be honest with one another. Kate soon announces that she is pregnant, but gives Richard time to decide if he wants to be with them, as it would mean relocating to Los Angeles. Despite initial hesitation, after visiting Gordon, Richard commits to settling down. He marries Kate and finds work at a local community college, though he finds the job unfulfilling, as the students are disinterested.

Over time, their relationship deteriorates. Kate has an affair with workmate Brian, which develops into a relationship, and they separate. Two years later, Richard has continued to live on the property Gordon had bought for them as a wedding present.

Richard is pulled over for driving under the influence, having mixed medication with alcohol. He loses his driving license and is forced to attend Alcoholics Anonymous meetings. Meanwhile, Olivia, now separated from her husband, returns to help Richard care for Jake while Kate travels with Brian.

As they spend time together, Richard and Olivia's mutual attraction resurfaces, culminating in a romantic encounter. When Kate and Brian return unexpectedly, the situation is exposed, causing friction. Richard’s father arrives and meets Jake for the first time.

Despite completing his required AA meetings, Richard is denied certification due to misbehavior. During a lecture, he abandons the prepared material, impressing a university representative who offers him a teaching position. However, Kate refuses to support his green card renewal, resulting in his deportation.

Back in the UK, Richard resumes teaching and cares for his ailing father, who encourages him to pursue Olivia. After Gordon's death, Richard returns to the U.S. illegally to fulfill his father's wish of having his ashes scattered in Los Angeles. He reconciles with Kate and attends Olivia’s book launch with the family. At the beach, after scattering the ashes, Richard proposes to Olivia.

== Cast ==
- Pierce Brosnan as Richard Haig
  - Oliver Bell as young Richard
- Salma Hayek as Olivia
- Jessica Alba as Kate
- Ben McKenzie as Brian
- Fred Melamed as Piggott
- Ivan Sergei as Tim
- Malcolm McDowell as Gordon Haig
- Lombardo Boyar as Ernesto
- Merrin Dungey as Angela
- Duncan Joiner as Jake
- Lee Garlington as Wendy
- Robert Mailhouse as Alan
- Marlee Matlin as Cindy

== Production ==
Jessica Alba, Pierce Brosnan, and Kristin Scott Thomas were the first actors to be cast in May 2013. Thomas later exited the project and was replaced by Salma Hayek. Ben McKenzie joined the cast on October 17, 2013.

== Filming ==
Principal photography began in Los Angeles on October 14, 2013, and concluded on November 9, 2013, with the shoot lasting 25 days.

== Release ==
The film had its world premiere at the American Film Market (AFM) on November 6, 2014. It was released in Denmark on June 4, 2015, followed by a DirecTV release on July 23, 2015. It later received a limited theatrical release, and was made available through video on demand on August 21, 2015.

== Reception ==
Some Kind of Beautiful was overwhelmingly panned by critics.

On Rotten Tomatoes, the film holds an approval rating of 6% based on 33 reviews, with an average rating of 3.25/10. The website’s critics consensus reads: "Stranding Pierce Brosnan as a charmless cad, this tone-deaf romantic comedy is Some Kind of something, but it definitely isn't beautiful." On Metacritic, the film has a weighted average score of 11 out of 100, based on 9 critics, indicating "overwhelming dislike."

Glenn Kenny of RogerEbert.com awarded Some Kind of Beautiful 1 star, describing it as “flimsy, clunky, and stale” and criticizing its lack of coherence and tonal inconsistency. Variety’s Justin Chang called it “a drearily unfunny romantic comedy,” remarking that the film squanders its cast in a contrived and directionless narrative. Vulture labeled the film “some kind of ugly,” taking aim at its dated gender politics and lifeless humor. Neil Genzlinger of The New York Times wrote that the film “struggles to find a purpose,” criticizing the uneven tone and underdeveloped characters.

Common Sense Media rated Some Kind of Beautiful 1 out of 5 stars, citing excessive sexual content, gender stereotypes, and a lack of emotional depth, concluding that it offers little of value even to adult audiences. Yahoo Movies described Some Kind of Beautiful as “tone-deaf and outdated,” failing to balance romantic comedy with serious themes and suffering from a clichéd, meandering plot. At Home in Hollywood similarly described Some Kind of Beautiful as “a prime example of miscasting and missed opportunity,” noting that even the charisma of its stars couldn’t redeem the film’s shallow script.
