= Bill Granger (author) =

American writer

- Born: June 1, 1941; Wisconsin Rapids, Wisconsin
- Died: 22 April 2012 (aged 70); Manteno, Illinois
- Citizenship: United States
- Education: DePaul University (B.A.)
- Occupations: Writer and novelist
- Years active: 1966–2000
- Known for: writing
- Spouse: Lori Granger
- Children: Alec Granger
- Awards: Edgar Award from the Mystery Writers of America for Public Murders (1981) and UPI Best Newspaper Columnist in Illinois (1984)

Bill Granger (June 1, 1941 – April 22, 2012) was an American novelist from Chicago specializing in political thrillers. He also wrote under the pseudonyms Joe Gash and Bill Griffith. He worked at the Chicago Tribune and other Illinois newspapers.

Some of his thrillers are Public Murders (1981), The November Man, Schism and The Shattered Eye.

== Early years ==
Born June 1, 1941, in Wisconsin Rapids, Wisconsin, William F. Granger lived most of his life in Chicago, on the city's South Side. He attended St. Ambrose Catholic School until 1955. Next, Granger attended DePaul University, where he was a student newspaper editor of The DePaulia. He graduated with a bachelor's degree in English in 1963. During his student years he was a copy boy with The Washington Post, where he met his wife Lori.

== Military service and writing career ==
From 1963 to 1965, Granger served with the United States Army before his writing career that span from the 1960s to 2000 with several Chicago newspapers:

- 1963-1966 Reporter with United Press International Chicago bureau
- 1966-1969 Reporter with Chicago Tribune
- 1969 Began teaching journalism classes at Columbia College, Chicago
- 1969-1978 Reporter and columnist with Chicago Sun Times
  - 1971 6-month leave from Sun Times to Europe and later covering Belfast civil war for Newsday, The Washington Post, and the Los Angeles Times news service
- 1972-1974 Returns and becomes suburban feature writer with Sun Times
- 1975-1977 Radio-television critic columnist with the Sun Times
- 1980 Contributing columnist with Chicago Tribune
- 1994-1999 Columnist with Daily Herald

== Novels ==
=== The November Man series ===
- 1979 The November Man
- 1981 Schism
- 1982 The Shattered Eye
- 1983 The British Cross
- 1984 The Zurich Numbers
- 1986 Hemingway's Notebook
- 1987 There Are No Spies
- 1988 The Infant Of Prague
- 1988 Henry McGee Is Not Dead
- 1990 The Man Who Heard Too Much
- 1990 League Of Terror
- 1991 The Last Good German
- 1993 Burning The Apostle

=== Drover series ===
- 1991 Drover
- 1992 Drover and the Zebras
- 1994 Drover and the Designated Hitter

=== Others ===
- 1980 Sweeps
- 1981 Public Murders (Edgar Award winner)
- 1982 Queen's Crossing
- 1982 Time for Frankie Coolin (as Bill Griffith)
- 1984 Priestly Murders
- 1985 Newspaper Murders
- 1987 The El Murders

== Later years and death ==
Granger had a stroke in January 2000, and ended his writing career. From 2002 to his death he lived in the Manteno Veterans Home; the immediate cause of death was a heart attack, although he had suffered a series of strokes since the 1990s. He is survived by wife Lori and son Alec.

In 2001, Lori Granger gave the DePaul University Special Collections and Archives a collection of documents and correspondence, including personal documents, photographs, and childhood items, related to her husband's career as a journalist and novelist.
