= Butterfly on a Wheel =

- Theatrical release poster
- Directed by: Mike Barker
- Written by: William Morrissey
- Produced by: William Vince; William Morrissey; Pierce Brosnan
- Starring: Pierce Brosnan; Maria Bello; Gerard Butler
- Cinematography: Ashley Rowe
- Edited by: Guy Bensley; Bill Sheppard
- Music by: Robert Duncan
- Production companies: Irish DreamTime; Infinity Features
- Distributed by: Icon Entertainment
- Release date: July 2007
- Running time: 91 minutes
- Countries: Canada; United Kingdom
- Language: English
- Budget: $20 million

Butterfly on a Wheel (US: Shattered) is a 2007 thriller film directed by Mike Barker, co-produced and written by William Morrissey. A British-Canadian joint production, it stars Pierce Brosnan, Gerard Butler, and Maria Bello. The film's title is an allusion to a line of Alexander Pope's poem "Epistle to Dr Arbuthnot": "Who breaks a butterfly upon a wheel?" The line is usually interpreted as questioning why someone would put great effort into achieving something minor or unimportant, or who would punish a minor offender with a disproportional punishment.

== Plot ==
Chicago couple Neil and Abby Randall have the perfect life and a perfect marriage. With their beautiful young daughter, Sophie, they are living the American dream until Sophie is suddenly kidnapped. Neil and Abby have no choice but to comply with the abductor's demands. Tom Ryan, an apparent sociopath, takes over their lives with the brutal efficiency of someone who has nothing to lose.

In the blink of an eye, Neil and Abby's safe and secure existence is turned upside down. Tom doesn't want their money and instead wants their life to be systematically dismantled and destroyed, piece by piece.

With time running out, Neil and Abby realise they have to submit to Tom's challenges over the next 24-hour period. He asks them how far will they go to save their child, and gives them a series of tasks to complete before they can have their daughter back. He requires them to withdraw more than US$130,000 (equivalent to $202,000 in 2025) from their bank which is all the money they have. After they give him the money, Tom burns it and throws it into a river along with their wallets. Tom then requires the pair to obtain $300 from nowhere, in a part of town where they don't have any friends. Abby pawns her bracelet and Neil his watch to get the $300. Tom requires Abby to deliver a document to the office of Neil's employer's competitor within 20 minutes, and Tom shows Neil a copy of the document, containing details of Neil's hacking into customer accounts, which if leaked will ruin Neil. Neil watches Abby deliver the document from a distance. Neil and Abby think that Sophie is being held in a hotel, and they try to rescue her, only to get caught by Tom. As punishment, Tom makes Abby take off her dress and put on an enticing short dress in front of both him and Neil.

Tom has one last test for Neil to save Sophie, in which he requires Neil to enter a house and kill the occupant. There, Neil finds Judy, a co-worker he has been having an affair with. Neil is greeted warmly by Judy, and is desperately confused as he sees a picture of Tom on the mantel and learns that Tom and Judy are married. Tom enters the house and tells Neil to shoot Judy or he will kill Sophie. Neil pulls the trigger but the gun isn't loaded. Tom reveals he knows about their affair and tells Neil that Sophie is safe at home.

As they head home, Neil lies to Abby and tells her that his boss was having an affair with Judy and Tom mistook Neil for that person, which is why Tom had tormented them the whole day. When they reach home, Sophie is asleep and has been there the whole time. Abby reveals to Neil that their daughter had never been kidnapped, and Tom had concocted the entire day to let Neil experience for one day the pain he had undergone. Neil says that Abby has ruined his career by delivering the document to the competitor's office, but she tells him it was blank, revealing she was involved in the deception. For 24 hours Abby has paid Neil back a portion of the pain she has experienced since learning of his affair.

== Cast ==
- Pierce Brosnan as Tom Ryan
- Gerard Butler as Neil Randall
- Maria Bello as Abby Randall
- Claudette Mink as Judy Ryan
- Callum Keith Rennie as Det. McGill
- Peter Keleghan as Karl Granger
- Nicholas Lea as Jerry Crane
- Emma Karwandy as Sophie Randall
- Samantha Ferris as Diane
- Dustin Milligan as Matt Ryan
- Desiree Zurowski as Helen Schriver

== Production ==
Pierce Brosnan joined the film's cast in late 2005. Maria Bello and Gerard Butler joined production on 19 January 2006.

Filming began in February 2006 and finished in May 2006. Vancouver stands in for Chicago but the production shot in the latter city for landscapes before moving to the United Kingdom for post-production. Filming also took place in Los Angeles.

== Remake ==
The 2010 Indian Malayalam film Cocktail and the 2014 Indian Tamil film Athithi are uncredited remakes of Butterfly on a Wheel.

The Marathi TV serial Guntata Hriday He, starring Mrunal Kulkarni, is based on the film's storyline.
