= Evelyn (2002 film) =

2002 Irish film by Bruce Beresford

- US theatrical release poster
- Directed by: Bruce Beresford
- Written by: Paul Pender
- Produced by: Pierce Brosnan; Michael Ohoven; Beau St. Clair
- Starring: Sophie Vavasseur; Pierce Brosnan; Stephen Rea; Alan Bates; Julianna Margulies; Aidan Quinn
- Cinematography: André Fleuren
- Edited by: Humphrey Dixon
- Music by: Stephen Endelman
- Production companies: United Artists; First Look Media; Cinerenta; Irish DreamTime
- Distributed by: Pathé Distribution
- Release dates: September 9, 2002 (TIFF); December 13, 2002 (U.S. limited); March 21, 2003 (UK)
- Running time: 93 minutes
- Country: Ireland
- Language: English
- Budget: $10 million
- Box office: $4.2 million

Evelyn is a 2002 Irish drama film directed by Bruce Beresford and written by Paul Pender, loosely based on the true story of Desmond Doyle and his fight in the Irish courts (December 1955) to be reunited with his children. The film stars Sophie Vavasseur in the title role, Pierce Brosnan as her father and Aidan Quinn, Julianna Margulies, Stephen Rea, and Alan Bates as supporters to Doyle's case. The film had a limited release in the United States, starting on December 13, 2002 and was later followed by the United Kingdom release on March 21, 2003.

The film was produced by Brosnan's own production company, Irish DreamTime, and others. It opened to positive reviews.

== Plot ==
Nine-year-old Evelyn Doyle and her two brothers, Maurice and Dermot, are left motherless when their mother leaves their drunkard, out-of-work father Desmond Doyle. When Desmond's mother-in-law reports the situation to the authorities, a judge decrees that the children are prohibited by law from being left in a broken home; they are placed in Church-run orphanages.

Evelyn's grandfather takes her to the girls' orphanage and explains to her that rays of light created by the sun shining in a specific spot through the clouds are called "angel rays"; they indicate that a guardian angel is watching over her. Evelyn finds when she enters the orphanage that conditions are harsh and many of the girls have been there for years.

Desmond finds little hope in regaining custody of his children because he cannot afford a lawyer, turns to drink, and assaults Father O'Malley—who punches him back. Desmond is helped by the local part-time bartender and chemist, Bernadette, who tells him to see her brother Michael, a solicitor. He makes it clear to Desmond that he cannot help him until he gets his act together—regular income and orderly life. Desmond finds decorating jobs and spends nights singing for tips with his father in the pub where Bernadette works.

Desmond gets a letter from Evelyn that says she hasn't been adjusting well and that Sister Brigid beat her when she questioned the Sister's authority; the Sister had beaten another student when she forgot Bible Scripture, although it stated that "God is merciful" therefore God would not want Sister Brigid to beat the children for forgetting Scripture. While seeking out Evelyn, he finds and shakes the Sister while threatening to "tear her limb from limb" should she ever touch his daughter again.

Desmond returns to drink, and after several rampages Bernadette refuses to continue her relationship with him until he shapes up; Desmond reforms. The American Nick Barron, and the injured rugby player and rebel lawyer Thomas Connolly, argue Desmond's court plea for regaining custody of his children; it is rejected by the courts leading Desmond and his children heartbroken and separated. But that night, the same night Desmond quits drinking, a gambler rigs Desmond to win copious amounts of money to pay his legal bills. But with nowhere to go, the case seems hopeless until Connolly proposes bringing an entirely new issue to the Irish Supreme Court: that the lack of children's custody by a parent is contrary to the Irish Constitution — an issue never successfully argued before the Court.

It takes public pressure (aided by television which had recently been introduced into Ireland) for the case to be heard before the Court. Desmond gives compelling testimony. The following day, Evelyn says in court that she formerly upheld the false story about her bruised face because she didn’t want Sister Brigid to get in trouble. Evelyn becomes visibly excited when ‘angel rays’ shine into the court windows—a sign to her that her grandfather is watching over her. Her replies to the questions directed at her elicit a number of sympathetic chuckles from the public gallery. Evelyn concludes her testimony with a recitation of a prayer asking God to forgive Sister Brigid and to ensure the prospering of Ireland and its people. Two of the three judges side with Desmond, the children are returned to him, and he acknowledges his love for Bernadette. They are shown on Christmas Day, celebrating as a family.

== Historical accuracy ==
Survivors of the industrial schools have criticised the claim in the credits of the film that changes in Irish law resulting from the case led to children being reunited with their families.

== Cast ==
- Pierce Brosnan as Desmond Doyle
- Julianna Margulies as Bernadette Beattie
- Frank Kelly as Henry Doyle
- Stephen Rea as Michael Beattie
- Aidan Quinn as Nick Barron
- Alan Bates as Tom Connolly
- Sophie Vavasseur as Evelyn Doyle
- Bosco Hogan as Father O'Malley
- Mark Lambert as Minister of Education
- John Lynch as Senior Counsel Mr. Wolfe
- Andrea Irvine as Sister Brigid
- Marian Quinn as Sister Theresa
- Karen Ardiff as Sister Felicity

== Production ==
Ardmore Studios and Castleknock College were used as filming locations. Rathcoran House, a disused convent school in Baltinglass, was also used as the orphanage / school scene.

== Reception ==
On Rotten Tomatoes the film has an approval rating of 65% based on reviews from 116 critics. On Metacritic the film has a score of 55% based on reviews from 30 critics.
