= Cassandra Harris =

Australian actress (1948–1991)

- Born: Sandra Colleen Waites; 15 December 1948; Sydney, New South Wales, Australia
- Died: 28 December 1991 (aged 43); Los Angeles, California, U.S.
- Occupation: Actress
- Years active: 1954–1985
- Spouses: William Firth (m. 1964; div. 1970) Dermot Harris (m. 1970; div. 1978) Pierce Brosnan (m. 1980)
- Children: 3

Sandra Colleen Waites (15 December 1948 – 28 December 1991), known professionally as Cassandra Harris, was an Australian actress.

== Early life ==
Born in Sydney, Harris was a student at the National Institute of Dramatic Art. She enrolled in 1961, aged 12, under the name Sandra Gleeson. She went on to perform in the Sydney stage production of Boeing Boeing (1964–1965).

== Career ==
Harris appeared in The Greek Tycoon (1978), Rough Cut (1980), and the James Bond film For Your Eyes Only (1981) as the Countess Lisl von Schlaf, the ill-fated mistress of Milos Columbo (played by Israeli actor Topol). While filming this movie, her third husband, Pierce Brosnan, met producer Albert R. Broccoli. Her dream was for Brosnan to become Bond and encouraged him to pursue the role. He was supposed to take over from Roger Moore after impressing Broccoli in his role in the TV series Remington Steele. He agreed to take the role but the TV producers refused to release him from his contract, he eventually was signed for the role in the early 90s and would proceed to play James Bond in four films. She guest-starred in several episodes of the television series Remington Steele with Brosnan; they married on 27 December 1980.

== Personal life and death ==
Harris had three children: Charlotte Harris (1971–2013) and Christopher Harris (b. 1972) by Dermot Harris, brother of actor Richard Harris, and a son Sean Brosnan (b. 1983), by Pierce Brosnan, who adopted Charlotte and Christopher after their father died in 1986.

In 1987, Harris was diagnosed with ovarian cancer, the same disease that had claimed her own mother's life. She had the diagnosed illness for four years until her death on 28 December 1991, at the age of 43. Her daughter Charlotte also died from ovarian cancer on 28 June 2013, aged 41.

== Filmography ==
Year	Title	Role	Notes
1978	The Greek Tycoon	Cassandra	
1980	Rough Cut	Mrs. Lloyd Palmer	
1981	For Your Eyes Only	Countess Lisl von Schlaf	

== Television ==
Year	Title	Role	Notes
1977	Space: 1999	Controller Sares	Episode "Devil's Planet"
1979	Enemy at the Door	Trudy Engel	
1982	Remington Steele	Felicia	Season 1 Ep 5 "Thou Shalt Not Steele"
1984	Remington Steele	Anna Simpson	Season 2 Ep 20 "Woman of Steele"
1985	Remington Steele	Felicia	Season 4 Ep 2 "Steele Searching: Part 2"
