= Matteo Ceccarini =

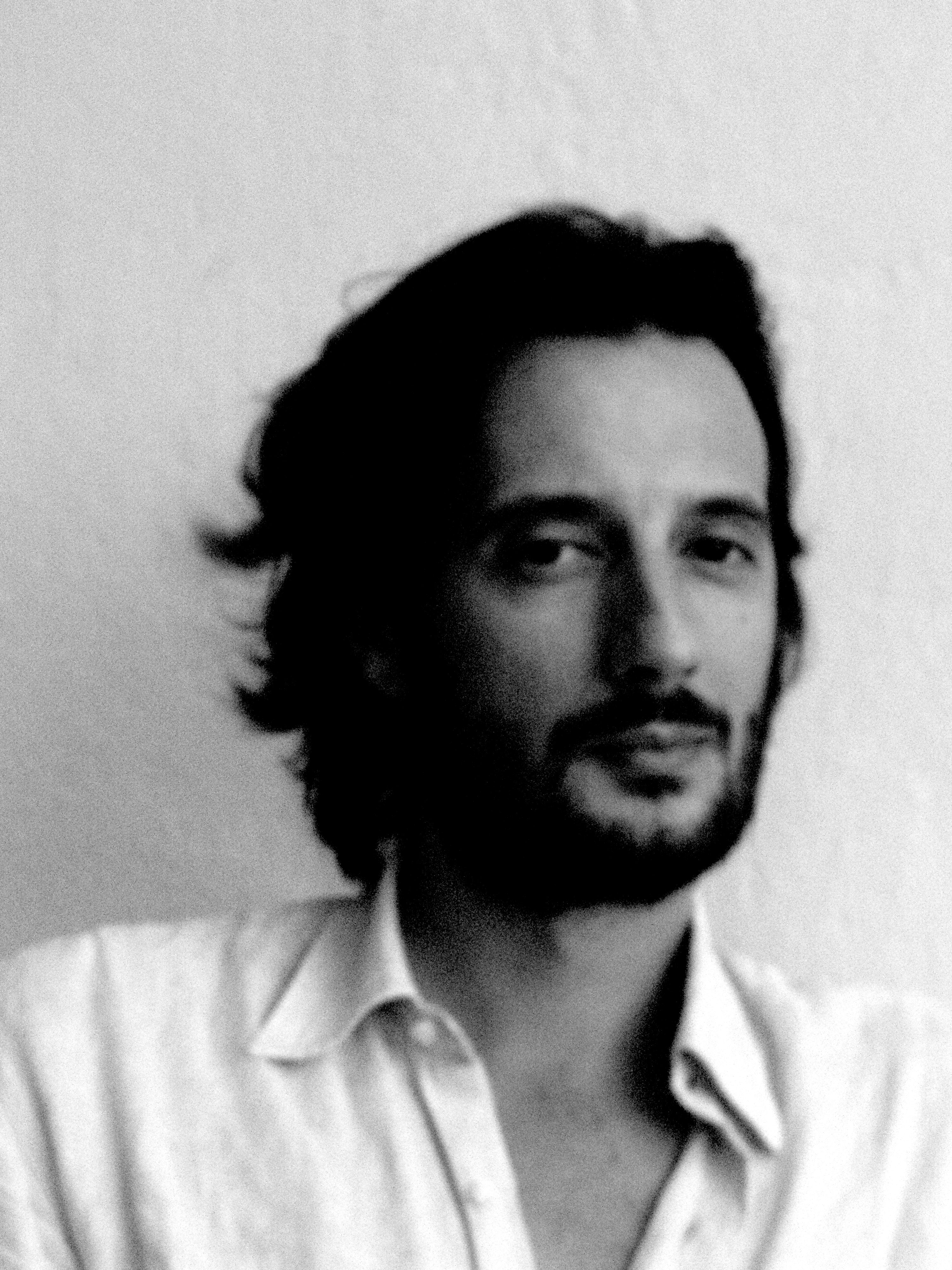
- Ceccarini in 2008

Background information
- Also known as: Vision, Deriva Collective, AstroMat
- Born: Matteo Ceccarini; 3 April 1972 (age 54)
- Genres: Electronica, ambient, techno, contemporary classical, minimalistic
- Occupations: DJ, Composer, Sound Designer, Producer
- Instruments: Turntables, Emulator, Moog, Doepfer
- Years active: 1993–present
- Labels: Sony, Edel, Wagram
- Website: www.derivacollective.co.uk

Matteo Ceccarini (born April 3, 1972) is a DJ, music producer, and sound designer.

== Early life ==
In the nineties Matteo began his career as an international deejay in some trendy clubs of Milan, including La Gare, Shocking Club, Plastic, Hollywood, Armani Privè. He worked in Paris at the Queen Club, La Locomotive and in Bali, Indonesia, where he became resident DJ at the Double Six Club in Legian from 1996 to 1999 and at the Cafè Luna for the White Parties.

Matteo has spent many years of his life in Asia, especially in India, where he has researched traditional sacred music.

Matteo was discovered by the designer Gianfranco Ferré who introduced him to the world of fashion. In 1993 he began working for some international designers composing music, DJing and sound designing for their shows.

== Career ==
Since 1992 Matteo has composed and played music as DJ for fashion designers and parties such as Giorgio Armani, Christian Dior, Vivienne Westwood, Valentino, Gianfranco Ferré, Ferragamo, Donna Karan, Hermes. In 1992 he released his first EP, Politic Dance. This was followed the following year by an EP under the pseudonym of "Lady Kiova" which contained 2 tracks; "Rotation" which was based on the music by Herb Alpert and the track "Macumba Love" was released on "Unknown Label", a sub-label of Klf Music.

In 1997 he worked with Richard Gere composing the music for Richard Gere's pro Tibetan photographic exhibition "Zanskar and Tibet" in Milan.

In 1999 Matteo composed a scandalous soundtrack for the Swish fashion show. Newspaper headlines said "Fashion Shock!" The sound contained a blessing by Pope Karol Wojtyla mixed with an avant-garde performance of the Greek actress Irene Papas simulating an orgasm. Matteo was questioned by the authorities. He explained that the concept was a blessing of procreation and was therefore released. The same year under the pseudonym "Vision" he released an album on the label Edel Music where the song Ponger Star featured on international compilations like Hôtel Costes, Buddha Bar and Nirvana Lounge.

In 2000 his dj set opened the "Frock 'n' Roll" event in Barcelona . The event was attended by Nelson Mandela and U2. In 2003 Matteo played at Mick Jagger's private 60th birthday party.

From 2003 until 2015, he produced the Emporio Armani Caffè and Giorgio Armani Privè compilations.

On 4 September 2004 Ceccarini curated the music for the wedding of John Elkann and Lavinia Borromeo Arese Taverna, at the Isola Madre, Stresa, Italy.

In 2009 Matteo and his partner Eva Riccobono composed and sang "Labbra" ("Lips"), a song recorded in bed. The song was a tribute for the 30th anniversary of "Je t'aime moi non plus" by Serge Gainsbourg.

In 2009 the photographer Paolo Roversi chose to shoot Matteo Ceccarini and Eva Riccobono as part of "L'Uomo Vogue" celebrities feature.

In 2012 Matteo composed the song "Petit Essai" that became the soundtrack of a film for Jaeger Lecoultre The song is a part of a mini album of piano solos called "Ma richesse c'est ma libertè". The same year he composed 2 more songs : "The Tube" and "Dimmi tu cos'è" for the soundtrack of the movie "E la chiamano estate" They Call It Summer by Paolo Franchi. The movie went on to win best director and best actress at the Rome International Film Festival.

In 2013 he released the EP Money Maker, with included a cover song by the band The Black Keys, The EP was recorded and mastered at the Abbey Road Studios, London.

2013 was the beginning of his collaboration with the Italian fashion magazine Flair. In his column Matteo interviewed international celebrities using visual stimulus only. In the same year his aesthetic sense in photography led him to be chosen to shoot Jacob Cohen's new international campaign, previously shot by the legendary photographer Elliott Erwitt.

In 2014 he founded the "Deriva Collective", a collective of artists who deal with sound research and experimentation known as sound sculpture. The Deriva Collective is based in London.

In August 2015 Ceccarini curated the music for the wedding of Beatrice Borromeo and Pierre Casiraghi, at the Rocca Borromeo di Angera, Italy.

Matteo Ceccarini has frequently curated the soundtrack for the annual Life Ball in Wien. Each year he collaborated with various international fashion designers, Missoni (2003), Gianfranco Ferré (2004), Calvin Klein, Kenneth Cole, Diane von Fürstenberg (2010), Vogue Italia hosts the 20th Anniversary Life Ball Fashion Show (2012), Roberto Cavalli (2013), Givenchy, Viktor & Rolf, Lanvin, Vivienne Westwood, Etro and DSquared², under the direction of Franca Sozzani (2014), Jean Paul Gaultier (2015).

Since its advent in 2013 every year Ceccarini has curated the entire sound for Vogue Fashion Dubai Experience, including fashion shows, the Dubai Mall soundscape and the party at the Armani Privè Club.

From February 2016, Matteo Ceccarini is the music columnist for GQ magazine.

In February 2016, Matteo Ceccarini released the sound project Ballchestra.

== Personal life ==
Matteo Ceccarini has a daughter Virginia born in 2001, from his relationship with Floriana Lainati. In 2004, in Wien during the Life Ball Event, Matteo met the Italian top model Eva Riccobono with whom he lives in London.

== Selected discography ==
=== Releases ===
- Politic Dance Vol. 1 (1992) Cadorna Records
- Rotation (1993) Klf Music
- Baje Bodie (1993) Future Rhythm
- Ponger Star (1999) Wagram
- Rites (2000) Edel Music
- Santa Maria (2000) Edel Music
- Beyond (2001) Edel Music
- Gomorra (2002) George V Records
- Until the fucking piano (2002) Wagram
- Silver Cox (2003) Neverstop
- Shotgun (2004) Sony Bmg
- Gate of heaven (2004) Ediemme Edizioni Musicali
- Jazz Suite, No. 2, Waltz 2 (2004) Sony Bmg
- Africanism (2004) Sony Bmg
- Labbra "Lips" (2009) SoDe Records
- Blue Ice (2010) SoDe Records
- Strong String (2011) SoDe Records
- Emporio Armani Caffè Vol. 1 (2003) Neverstop Music
- Emporio Armani Caffè Vol. 2 (2004) Sony Bmg
- Emporio Armani Caffè Vol. 3 (2006) SoDe Records
- Emporio Armani Caffè Vol. 4 (2008) SoDe Records
- Emporio Armani Caffè Vol. 5 (2009) SoDe Records
- Emporio Armani Caffè Vol. 6 (2011) SoDe Records
- Emporio Armani Caffè Vol. 7 (2012) SoDe Records- Giorgio Armani
- Emporio Armani Caffè Vol. 8 (2015) Deriva Collective Records - Giorgio Armani
- Emporio Armani Caffè Vol. 9 (2017) Deriva Collective Records - Giorgio Armani
- Emporio Armani Caffè Vol. X (2018) Deriva Collective Records - Giorgio Armani
- Amigdala (2012) SoDe Records
- Petit Essai (2012) SoDe Records
- Money Maker (2013) SoDe Records
- The Tube (2013) SoDe Records
- Beijing Blues (2013) SoDe Records
- Light me (2013) SoDe Records
- Giorgio Armani Privè (2014) Deriva Collective Records-Giorgio Armani
- Matteo Ceccarini for Oxfam (2015) Deriva Collective Records
- Ballchestra (2016) Deriva Collective Records
- One Planet One Future (2016) (Original Soundtrack) Deriva Collective Records
- Geometric Physical (2018) Deriva Collective Records
- Ode (2019) Deriva Collective Records
- Private Ouverture (2019) Deriva Collective Records
- Medusa (2020) Deriva Collective Records

== Awards ==
In 2013, he produced in association with Ginevra Elkann, Ryan Gosling, Babak Jalali, Eva Riccobono the movie White Shadow by the director Noaz Deshe, who went on to win the Lion of the Future at the 70° Venice International Film Festival. In 2018 he won the best music for fashion Chi e' Chi Award.
