= New Horizons Film Festival =

Annual film festival held in Wrocław, Poland

New Horizons International Film Festival
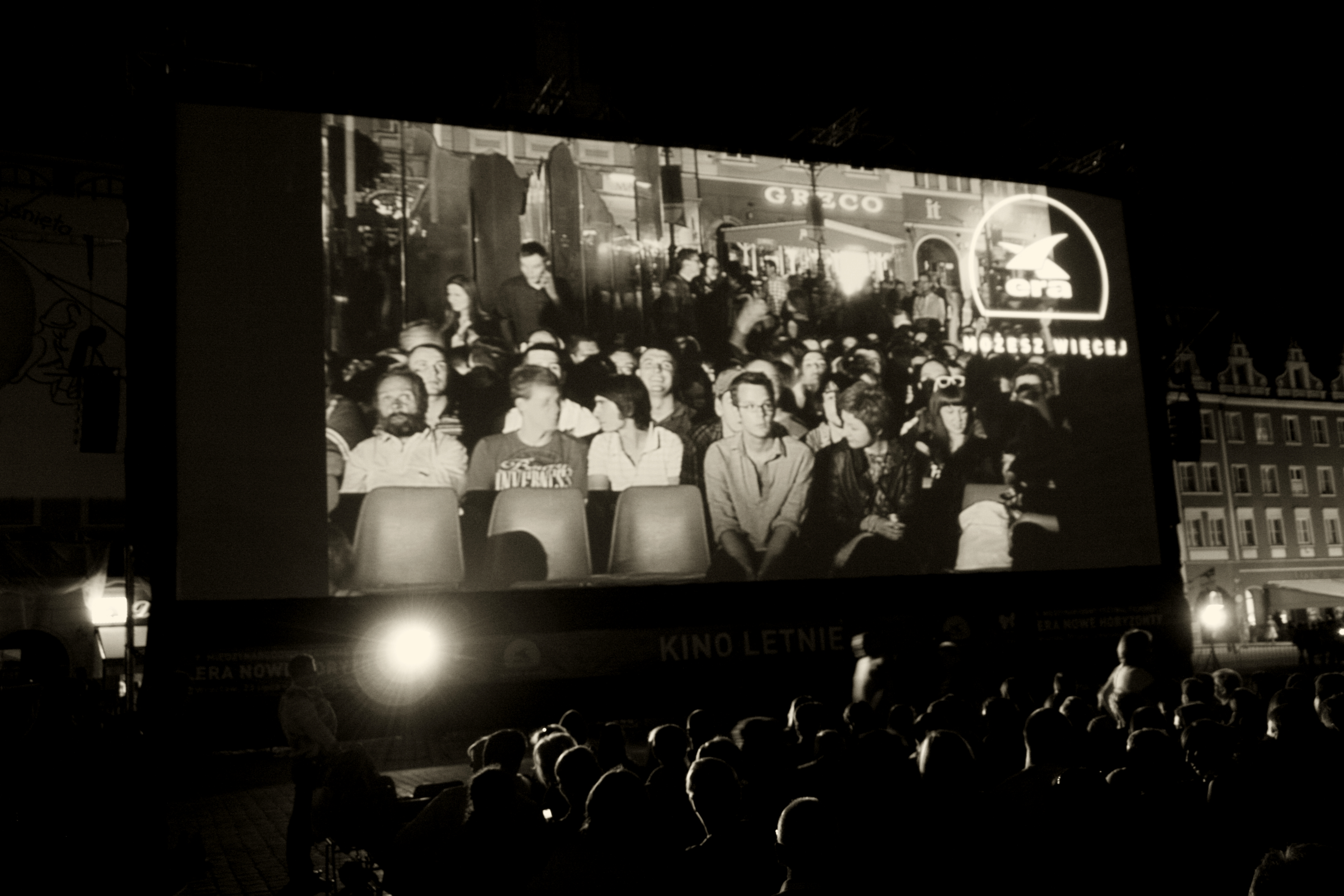
- NHIFF, Wrocław, 2009
- Location: Wrocław, Poland
- Founded: 2001
- Awards: Grand Prix; Audience Award
- Hosted by: New Horizons Association
- No. of films: 283 films in 2026
- Website: NHIFF

The New Horizons International Film Festival (pl: Międzynarodowy Festiwal Filmowy Nowe Horyzonty) is a film festival held annually at the end of July in Wrocław, Poland since 2001. It is the biggest and most popular film festival and cultural event in the country and region.

The festival focuses on arthouse cinema. Its programmes include retrospectives of avant-garde and experimental filmmakers, showcases of national cinemas, a panorama of auteur films of the season, as well as curated thematic sections. The most important of several competitions is the New Horizons International Competition, which aims to present uncompromising films searching for bold forms of expression i.e. the new horizons of cinema. Awards in the competition include the Grand Prix, Special Mention(s), and the Audience Award.

New Horizons is an interdisciplinary festival, where visual arts and music are presented alongside cinema. Filmmakers whose works are shown at New Horizons tend to cross the boundaries of traditional cinema and enter the experimental field of visual and performing arts. The festival's Artistic Stage, organised in cooperation with BWA Wrocław, and presenting film forms in the so-called extended field as part of exhibitions in Wrocław galleries, is a natural extension and complement to the film programmes.

Accessible to all, the festival combines various types of initiatives, including film screenings, educational activities, and industry meetings. In 2026, 283 films from 92 countries (including 43 Polish productions and co-productions), 240 features and 43 shorts were screened.

== Festival history ==
The event is organized by the New Horizons Association (Stowarzyszenie Nowe Horyzonty). The founder and moving spirit of the festival is Roman Gutek. Marcin Pieńkowski held the position of Festival Director 2021-2025. Dorota Lech has been the Festival Director since 2026.

In recent years, the festival has organised retrospectives of Chantal Akerman, Wang Bing, Bertrand Bonello, Lee Chang-dong, Alice Diop, Bruno Dumont, Jean-Luc Godard, Lucile Hadžihalilović, Wojciech Has, Joanna Hogg, Agnieszka Holland, Jonas Mekas, Anne-Marie Miéville, Laura Mulvey, Andrzej Munk, Nagisa Ōshima, Satyajit Ray, Anka Sasnal & Wilhelm Sasnal, Angela Schanelec, Albert Serra, Terayama Shūji, Yvonne Rainer, Alain Robbe-Grillet, Glauber Rocha, Ulrich Seidl, Alain Tanner, Athina Rachel Tsangari, Glauber Rocha, Brothers Quay, and Krzysztof Zanussi.

After the first edition in Sanok, the Festival was moved to Cieszyn, where it was held between 2002 and 2005. Since 2006, the event has taken place in Wrocław and has evolved significantly. It is frequented by a growing number of cinephiles and hosts many notable guests each year, including Lisandro Alonso, Theo Angelopoulos, Šarūnas Bartas, Leos Carax, Nick Cave, James Benning, Dardenne brothers, Lav Diaz, Claire Denis, Bruno Dumont, Asghar Farhadi, Abel Ferrara, Terry Gilliam, Amos Gitai, Jean-luc Godard, Miguel Gomes, Peter Greenaway, Hal Hartley, Agnieszka Holland, Kim Ki-duk, Radu Jude, Naomi Kawase, Abdellatif Kechiche, Kim Ki-duk, Andrey Konchalovskiy, Marie Kreutzer Nadav Lapid, Sebastián Lelio, Lou Ye, Dušan Makavejev, Tsai Ming-liang, Nanni Moretti, Cristian Mungiu, Gaspar Noé, Ulrike Ottinger, Jafar Panahi, Carlos Reygadas, Carlos Saura, Béla Tarr, Alexander Sokurov, Peter Tscherkassky, Agnès Varda, Andrzej Wajda, Vincent Ward, and Andrzej Żuławski.

Since 2008, it has been accredited by the International Federation of Film Producers' Associations (FIAPF) as a competitive, specialized festival with an "avant-garde status", recognizing its focus on bold and unconventional cinema.

Between 2010 and 2017, a FIPRESCI Award was awarded.

In 2016, when Wrocław was named the European Capital of Culture, the festival included events related to this occasion including a special section called Masters of European Cinema.

== New Horizons International Competition ==
12 films selected in the section compete for the Grand Prix and the Audience Award.

=== Grand Prix ===
At the beginning the festival's Grand Prix was an audience award, but since 2009 it is given by the International Jury. The first main prize selected that way was awarded to Steve McQueen's Hunger.

Year	Title	Director	Country	notes
2002	Paradox Lake	Przemysław Reut	(United States) / (Poland)	chosen by audience
2003	Dolls	Takeshi Kitano	(Japan)	chosen by audience
2004	A Common Thread (Brodeuses)	Éléonore Faucher	(France)	chosen by audience
2005	Tarnation	Jonathan Caouette	(United States)	chosen by audience
2006	The Sacred Family (La sagrada familia)	Sebastián Lelio (as Sebastián Campos)	(Chile)	chosen by audience
2007	Potosi, le temps du voyage	Ron Havilio	(France) / (Israel)	chosen by audience
2008	Rain of the Children	Vincent Ward	(New Zealand)	chosen by audience
2009	Hunger	Steve McQueen	(United Kingdom) / (Republic of Ireland)	the first Grand Prix chosen by International Jury
2010	Mundane History	Anocha Suwichakornpong	(Thailand)	
2011	Attenberg	Athina Rachel Tsangari	(Greece)	
2012	Thursday Till Sunday	Dominga Sotomayor Castillo	(Chile) / (Netherlands)	
2013	Celestial Wives of the Meadow Mari	Aleksei Fedorchenko	(Russia)	
2014	White Shadow	Noaz Deshe	(Italy) / (Germany) / (Tanzania)	
2015	Lucifer	Gust Van den Berghe	(Belgium)	
2016	In the Last Days of the City	Tamer El Said	(Egypt) / (Germany) / (United Kingdom) / (United Arab Emirates)	
2017	Western	Valeska Grisebach	(Germany) / (Bulgaria) / (Austria)	
2018	Holiday	Isabella Eklöf	(Denmark) / (Netherlands) / (Sweden)	
2019	Bait	Mark Jenkin	(United Kingdom)	
2020	The Metamorphosis of Birds	Catarina Vasconcelos	(Portugal)	event held online due to the COVID-19 pandemic
2021	Theo and the Metamorphosis	Damien Odoul	(France)	
2022	See You Friday, Robinson	Mitra Farahani	(France) / (Switzerland) / (Lebanon) / (Iran)	
2023	The Delinquents	Rodrigo Moreno	(Argentina) / (Brazil) / (Chile)	
2024	Explanation for Everything	Gábor Reisz	(Hungary) / (Slovakia)	
2025	Punku	J. D. Fernández Molero	(Peru) , (Spain)	
2026	Dry Leaf	Alexandre Koberidze	(Georgia (country)) , (Germany)	

=== Audience award ===
Since the main prize became jury-selected in 2009, the Audience Award became a separate recognition, the second in importance. Three films managed to win both Grand Prix and Audience award: White Shadow in 2014, Bait in 2019 and The Metamorphosis of Birds in 2020.

Year	Title	Director	Country
2009	Oxygen	Ivan Vyrypaev	(Russia)
2010	Le quattro volte	Michelangelo Frammartino	(Italy)
2011	Brownian Movement	Nanouk Leopold	(Netherlands)
2012	Donoma	Djinn Carrénard	(France)
2013	Floating Skyscrapers	Tomasz Wasilewski	(Poland)
2014	White Shadow	Noaz Deshe	(Italy) / (Germany) / (Tanzania)
2015	Goodnight Mommy	Severin Fiala, Veronika Franz	(Austria)
2016	All These Sleepless Nights	Michał Marczak	(Poland)
2017	Photon	Norman Leto	(Poland)
2018	An Elephant Sitting Still	Hu Bo	(China)
2019	Bait	Mark Jenkin	(United Kingdom)
2020	The Metamorphosis of Birds	Catarina Vasconcelos	(Portugal)
2021	Death of a Virgin and the Sin of Not Living	George Peter Barbari	(Lebanon)
2022	107 Mothers	Péter Kerekes	(Slovakia) / (Czech Republic) / (Ukraine)
2023	Blackbird Blackbird Blackberry	Elene Naveriani	(Switzerland) / (Georgia (country))
2024	Hoard	Luna Carmoon	(United Kingdom)
2025	The Devil Smokes (and Saves the Burnt Matches in the Same Box)	Ernesto Martínez Bucio	(Mexico)
2026	La Gradiva	Marine Atlan	(France)

== Festival programmes ==
=== 2009 ===
- Opening gala – Michael Haneke's The White Ribbon
- Closing – Martin Provost's Séraphine
- New horizons international competition
- Films on art international competition
- New Polish films competition
- Polish short films competition
- European short films competition
- Panorama
- Special screenings
- Documentaries / Essays
- Third eye
- Midnight madness: ozploitation
- Cinema of Canada
- Cinema of Sweden
- Golden era of Hungarian cinema
- Retrospective: Tsai Ming-liang
- Retrospective: Jennifer Reeves
- Retrospective: Krzysztof Zanussi
- Retrospective: Piotr Dumała
- 60 years of WFDiF
- From Polański to...
- New horizons of film language: editing
- Season 2008/2009
- Films for children
- Silent films with live music
- Screenings at the market square
- Concerts
- Exhibitions

=== 2010 ===
- Opening gala – Xavier Beauvois' Of Gods and Men
- Closing – Francis Ford Coppola's Tetro
- New horizons international competition
- Films on art international competition
- New Polish films competition
- Polish short films competition
- European short debuts competition
- Panorama
- Special screenings
- Documentaries / Essays
- Third eye
- Midnight madness: Philippe Mora; samurai cinema
- Cinema of Turkey
- Retrospective: Jean-Luc Godard
- Retrospective: Brothers Quay
- Retrospective: Klaus Maria Brandauer
- Retrospective: Laura Mulvey
- Retrospective: Wojciech Jerzy Has
- Retrospective: Daniel Szczechura
- New horizons of film language
- Season 2009/2010
- Screenings at the market square
- Concerts
- Exhibitions

=== 2011 ===
- Opening gala – Asghar Farhadi's A Separation
- Closing – Pedro Almodóvar's The Skin I Live In
- New horizons international competition
- Films on art international competition
- New Polish films competition
- Polish short films competition
- European short debuts competition
- Panorama
- Documentaries / Essays
- Third eye
- Special screenings
- 'Round midnight
- Behind the pink curtain
- Red westerns
- Norway expanded
- New horizons of film language: production design
- Hommage: Anja Breien
- Retrospective: Bruno Dumont
- Retrospective: Werner Nekes
- Retrospective: Jack Smith
- Retrospective: Terry Gilliam
- Retrospective: Andrzej Munk
- Retrospective: Mariusz Wilczyński
- Season 2010/2011
- Films for children
- Screenings at the market square
- Concerts
- Discussion panels, workshops
- Exhibitions

=== 2012 ===
- Opening gala – Michael Haneke's Amour
- Closing – Walter Salles' On the Road
- New horizons international competition
- Films on art international competition
- Polish short films competition
- European short films competition
- Panorama
- Special screenings
- Gdynia in Wrocław
- Documentaries / Essays
- Third eye: The Happy End. Images for the end of the world
- Midnight madness: From stage to screen
- Mockumentaries
- New horizons of film language: sound
- The Karol Irzykowski Film Studio
- Films for children
- The Cinema of Mexico
- Retrospective: Carlos Reygadas
- Retrospective: Ulrich Seidl
- Retrospective: Dušan Makavejev
- Retrospective: Peter Tscherkassky and Eve Heller
- Retrospective: Witold Giersz
- Season 2011/2012
- Screenings at the market square
- Concerts
- Discussion panels, workshops
- Exhibitions

=== 2023 ===
23rd mBank New Horizons International Film Festival was held in Wrocław from 20 July to 30 2023. 251 films including 196 features and 55 shorts were screened.

- Grand Prix award: 2023 heist comedy-drama The Delinquents by Rodrigo Moreno.
- Special Mention: After (France) by Anthony Lapia
- Audience Award: Blackbird Blackbird Blackberry (Switzerland, Georgia) by Elene Naveriani.

=== 2024 ===
- Grand Prix award: Explanation for Everything by Gábor Reisz.

=== 2025 ===
- Grand Prix award: Punku by J. D. Fernández Molero
- Audience Award:: The Devil Smokes (and Saves the Burnt Matches in the Same Box) by Ernesto Martínez Bucio.

=== 2026 ===
The 26th edition the film festival was held in Wrocław from 23 July to 2 August.

- Grand Prix award: Dry Leaf by Alexandre Koberidze
- Audience Award:: La Gradiva by Marine Atlan

== See also ==
- List of film festivals
- American Film Festival (other film festival held in Wrocław organized by Stowarzyszenie Nowe Horyzonty)
