= Primeira Idade =

Primeira Idade, Lda.
- Company type: Privately held company
- Industry: Film production
- Genre: Drama film, Documentary film
- Founded: 2014
- Founder: Pedro Fernandes Duarte
- Headquarters: Lisbon, Portugal
- Website: http://www.primeira-idade.pt

Primeira Idade is an independent Portuguese film production company based in Lisbon.

== Awards ==
It has produced the feature-length hybrid documentary The Metamorphosis of Birds, directed by Catarina Vasconcelos which was world premiered at the 70th Berlin International Film Festival in February 2020, at the Encounters Section, where it was awarded the FIPRESCI Award for Best Film at the Encounters Section.

== Films ==
- Ruby a fiction short film, directed by Mariana Gaivão, winner of the Best Director Award at the Curtas Vila do Conde Festival in 2019, and screened at the International Film Festival Rotterdam in January 2020.
- Look No Further, directed by André Marques.
- Bad Bunny, directed by Carlos Conceição, world premiered at the 70th Cannes Film Festival's Critics' Week, in May 2017.

== International Co-production ==
Primeira Idade has also co-produced internationally titles such as Snakeskin, directed by Singaporean Daniel Hui, highlighted with the Special Jury Award of the Torino Film Festival in November 2014, as well as the Award of Excellency for the New Asian Currents section of the Yamagata Documentary Film Festival, and a Special Jury Mention at the Montreal International Documentary Festival.

== Filmography ==
- 2020 - The Metamorphosis of Birds, directed by Catarina Vasconcelos
- 2019 - Ghosts: Long Way Home, directed by Tiago Siopa
- 2019 - Bird's Nest, directed by Miguel de Jesus
- 2019 - Ruby, directed by Mariana Gaivão
- 2019 - Look No Further, directed by André Marques, in co-production with Offshore Films in France
- 2016 - Bad Bunny, directed by Carlos Conceição, in co-production with Epicentre Films in France
- 2016 - Fado, directed by Jonas Rothlaender, in co-production with StickUp Filmproduktion in Germany
- 2015 - Wake Up, Leviathan, directed by Carlos Conceição, in co-production with Mirabilis Produções in Angola
- 2014 - Snakeskin, directed by Daniel Hui, in co-production with 13 Little Pictures in Singapore
