= André Marques =

André Marques may refer to:

- André Marques (footballer) (born 1987), Portuguese footballer
- André Marques (pianist) (born 1975), Brazilian jazz pianist
- André Marques (actor) (born 1979), Brazilian actor, television host and entertainer
- André Marques (filmmaker) (born 1984), Portuguese film director, screenwriter and a musician
