= Babak Jalali =

Iranian film director and producer

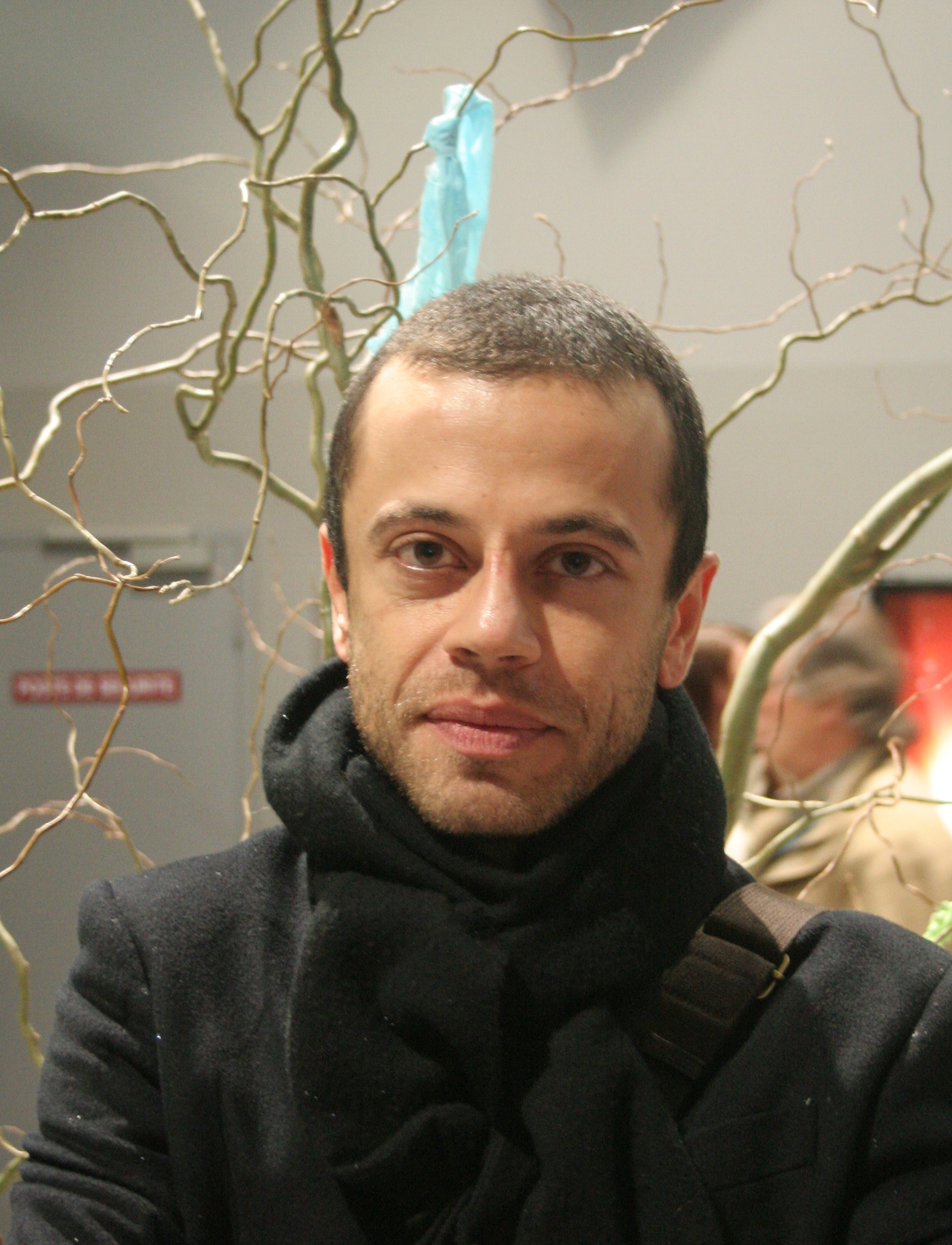
Babak Jalali

Babak Jalali (Persian: بابک جلالی) is an Iranian–British film director and producer, notably directing Radio Dreams, for which he won the Hivos Tiger Award at the 45th International Film Festival Rotterdam.

== Early life ==
Jalali was born in Gorgan, Iran, and grew up in London, where he attended the London Film School.

== Career ==
=== Directing ===
In 2006, Jalali was nominated for the BAFTA Award for Best Short Film for his short "Heydar, an Afghan in Tehran."

Jalali's first feature film, the 2010 Frontier Blues, was developed with support from the Cannes Cinéfondation. Frontier Blues premiered in Locarno Festival Competition and also screened in the 2010 "New Directors" series at the Museum of Modern Art and Lincoln Center.

In 2016, Jalali's film Radio Dreams premiered at the 45th International Film Festival Rotterdam, winning for the Hivos Tiger Award, the festival's top honor.

Jalali's third feature Land is an Italian-French-Dutch co-production, supported by CNC, TorinoFilmLab, Eurimages, Mibac and Doha Film Institute among others. It premiered in Berlin International Film Festival.

Jalali co-wrote, edited, and directed his fourth feature Fremont, which premiered at the Sundance Film Festival in January 2023. For Fremont, Jalali was nominated as a director for Best International Feature Film at the British Independent Film Awards in 2024, and he won the John Cassavetes Awards at the Independent Spirit Awards 2024.

=== Producing ===
Jalali has also produced films, including Italian director Duccio Chiarini’s Short Skin, which won support from the Venice Biennale College and premiered at the Venice Film Festival in 2014; Israel-born, Berlin-based director Noaz Deshe's feature White Shadow; and Iranian director Ali Jaberansari's feature The Ladder, for which Jalali, Jaberansari and Chiarini (also producing) won production support at the Sofia International Film Festival.
