= Life Ball =

HIV and AIDS awareness event in Vienna

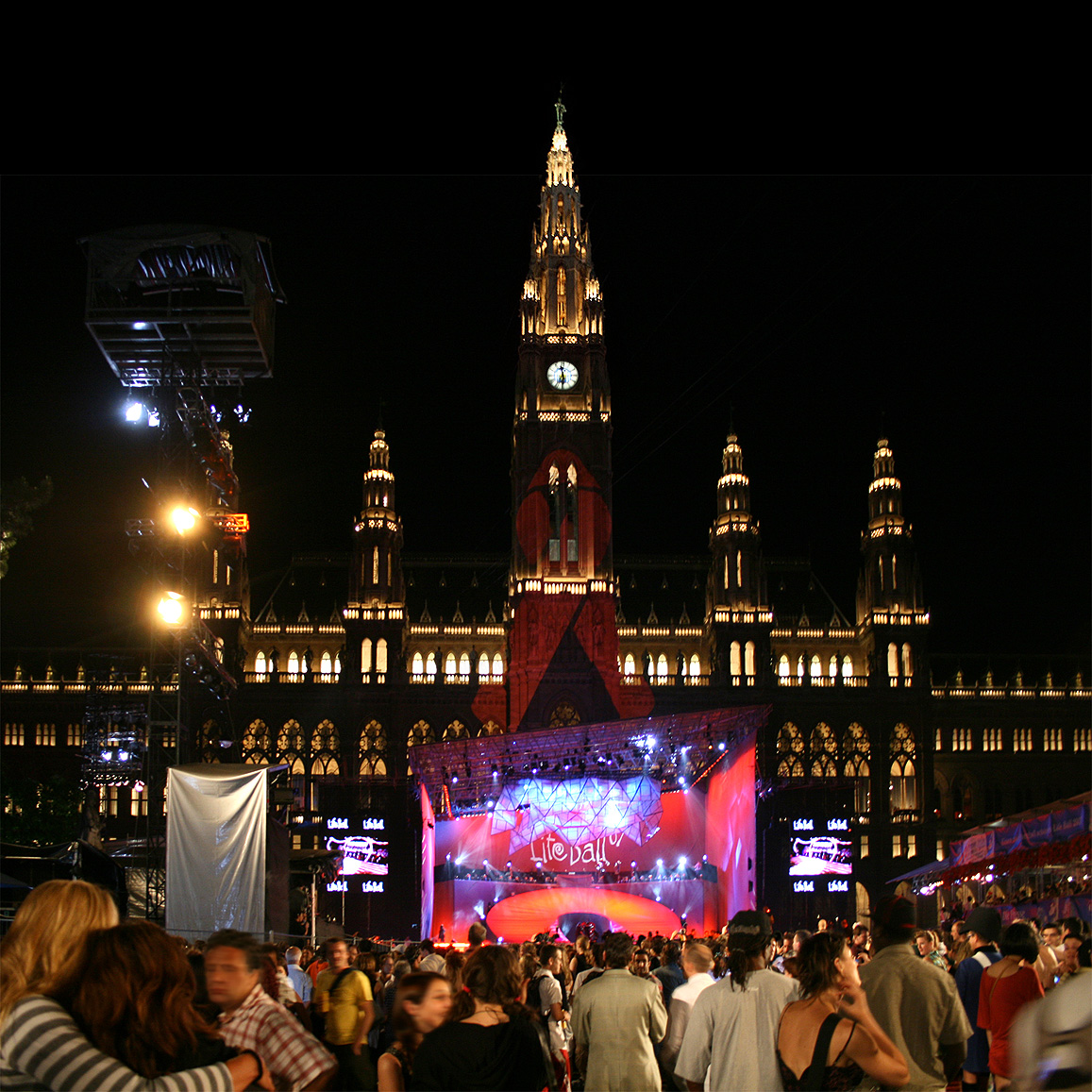
Life Ball 2007

The Life Ball in Vienna is the biggest charity event in Europe supporting people with HIV or AIDS. The event is organized by the nonprofit organization AIDS LIFE, which was founded in 1992 by Gery Keszler and Torgom Petrosian.

AIDS LIFE supports aid organizations devoted to helping people who are HIV-positive or have AIDS. The team entrusted with the allocation of funds thoroughly examines each petition. Moreover, it is an explicit goal of AIDS LIFE to raise public awareness.

== The event ==
The Life Ball—one of the biggest annual charity events in the world—has attracted strong international interest and attention. The main priority of the Ball is, however, not only the celebration of the party people live acts, but the fight against AIDS.

To ensure that the meaning of this major event is not forgotten, the opening ceremony on Vienna's city hall square includes moments of silence and speeches by international stars and partners, which focus on raising awareness for AIDS. Since the establishment of this society highlight, which has become a real tradition, numerous celebrities (designers, actors, musicians, politicians, and models) show their personal commitment to the issue with live performances and send a strong signal of solidarity. They make use of their popularity and position as role models for a good cause.

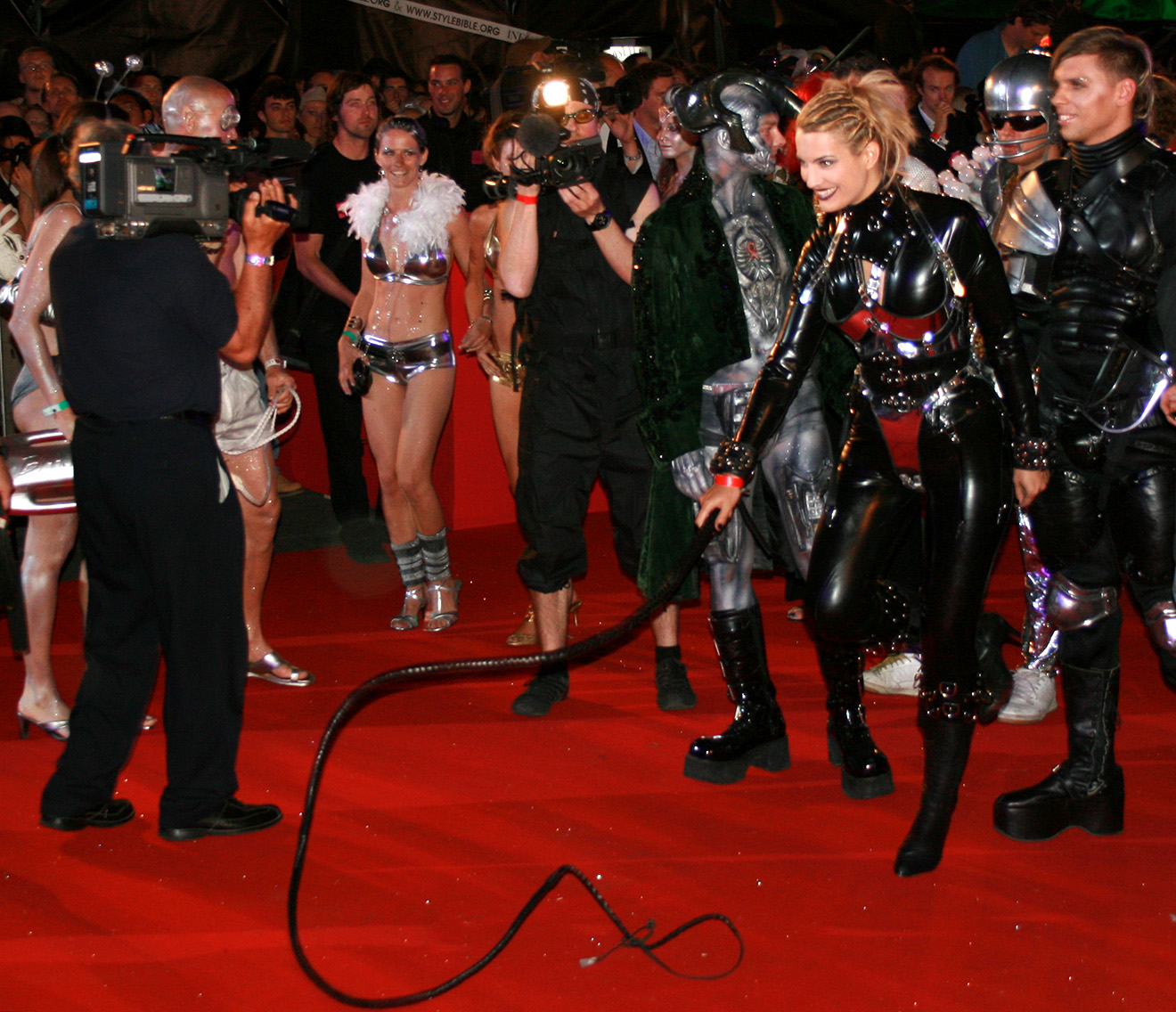
Zweitfrau on the red carpet (2008)

The number of tickets for the Life Ball is limited to 3,780. To maintain the unique style of the event, different ticket categories are available: a fixed number of tickets called "Style Tickets" are available at half price and are for those who meet the dress code of the Life Ball Style Bible. The costumes should correspond to the theme of the Ball. These are also the only guests—besides the stars—who are allowed to walk down the red carpet, which leads from Ringstrasse Boulevard across city hall square to the main stage in front of Vienna's city hall. In the run-up to the 2008 Ball, Gery Keszler voiced the wish that guests try to be less provocative and more creative. As Chris Lohner put it: "A penis is not yet a costume". Guests can apply for Style Tickets on the Style Bible webpage. Guests in normal evening attire pay the full ticket price. In 2001, a ticket sales system in which interested parties register in a raffle for tickets via text message was introduced. Usually, as many as 60,000 ticket registrations are received within the two-day sales period. The ticket winners in both categories are selected randomly from all applications. A small number of tickets is issued through various campaigns (e.g., Life Ball Warm Up, eBay auctions, types of raffles where the ticket win is hidden in condom packages that are sold in selected bars and restaurants, a.s.o.) International guests can book Life Ball Packages including plane tickets and hotel as well as table bookings, which cost 4- to 5-figure euro amounts. In 2009, early table bookings slowed down due to the new Austrian anti-corruption act that entered into force in 2008.

The opening gala features a wide variety of music, from operetta to pop, national as well as international stars, and the fashion show on the huge Red Ribbon stage. Until 2008, it could be viewed free of charge on city hall square, which could accommodate 45,000 people; in 2009, however, access to the first part of the opening ceremony was limited to those who had tickets to the Ball itself and a viewers' stand was constructed for those who wanted to view the opening ceremony. Guests can dance in the various patios and rooms of the city hall as they enjoy the offerings of the many bars and buffets. Some of the international stars perform on stages on the Ball premises.

The charity event is known far beyond the Austrian borders today. By now, over 60 TV stations and a total of 500 national and international media representatives cover the event each year. In case of repeated accreditation, the organizers check whether the topic of AIDS was also addressed in the coverage to avoid that only stars and celebrities are mentioned. Austrian public broadcaster ORF 1 has been covering the opening show live since 2007 as part of a "theme night" followed by interviews with famous guests after the opening, attracting around 400,000 viewers each year. Since 2007, the opening show has also been broadcast on 3sat with a time delay. In 2008, Austrian channel Puls 4 also had a live broadcast of the Ball after ORF's live broadcast. The new German TV station TIMM covered the event in 2009 in a 4-hour non-stop program, for which the ORF signal was used in part.

== History ==
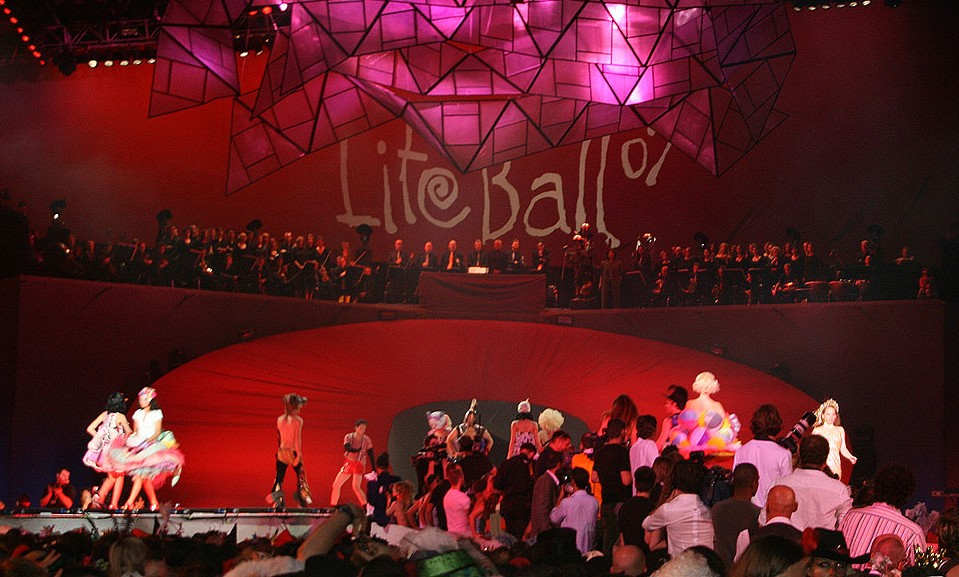
Opening show of Life Ball 2007

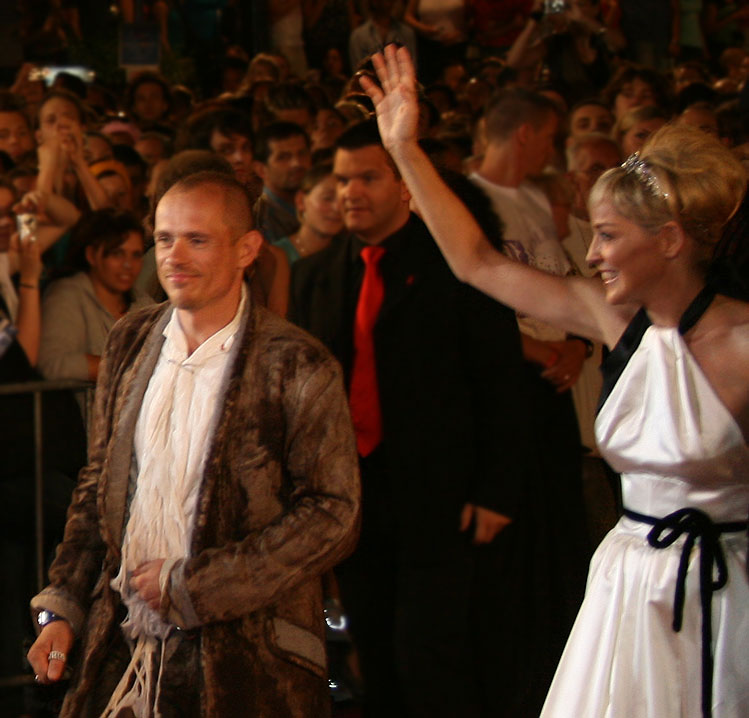
Gery Keszler and Sharon Stone (Life Ball 2007)

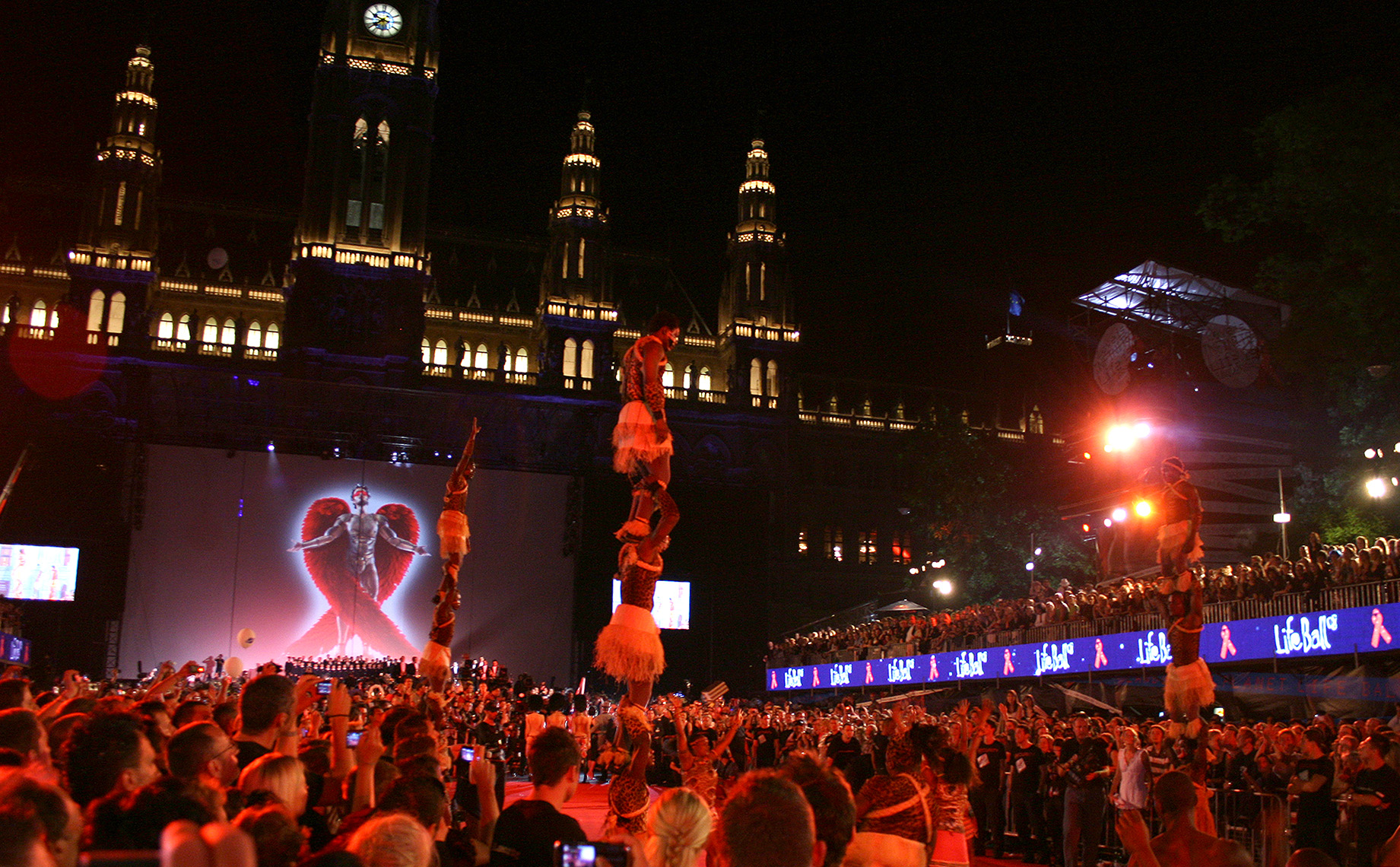
Artists of Afrika! Afrika! at the Opening show of Life Ball 2008

Organizer and founder Gery Keszler is the "face" and engine of the Life Ball. It is also mainly his achievement that fashion representatives and celebrities of the entertainment industry such as Roseanne Barr, Elton John, Catherine Deneuve, Liza Minnelli, Sharon Stone, Dita von Teese, Anastacia, Heidi Klum, Naomi Campbell and Jenna Jameson attend the opening show. Some play an active role in the event's program, others just enjoy the party and celebrate. Gery Keszler chose the Vienna city hall as venue because he found it had great symbolic value. He felt that it should be part of the Viennese ball tradition, but be more provocative and glamorous. He was given the opportunity to present his project to then mayor Helmut Zilk. Zilk was convinced of the positive effect of such an event and gave it a try. He agreed to let Keszler have the festival hall in the Vienna city hall and supported him despite all opposition. Zilk's stance was remarkable as support for this cause was not something that could be taken for granted at that time. There were also doubts as to whether the event would be a success. For Keszler it was exciting and nerve-racking until the opening, because the first guests arrived rather late.

The first Life Ball took place on May 29, 1993. In addition to the Vienna city administration, the event had only two sponsors. The ATS 1,100,000 (EUR 79,940) raised by the first Ball were donated to the non-profit organization AIDS LIFE, which was founded by Gery Keszler and Torgom Petrosian in 1992, to support other organizations helping people who are HIV-positive or have AIDS. Ever since the first Life Ball, a fashion show, then presented by Thierry Mugler, has become a key feature of the event. In the second year, at the Life Ball on May 28, 1994, the money raised through donations, sponsoring and ticket sales was doubled. The first two Balls were covered by TV stations in Austria and Germany. The third Ball on May 6, 1995, already attracted interest from French and Spanish broadcasters as well as MTV. In the subsequent years, the number of guests attending the opening show and the Ball as well as the number of journalists, radio stations, print media articles and sponsors rose steadily. This also increased the funds raised by the Life Ball to be donated to AIDS projects and research. In 1999, the Vienna city hall was renovated and the Ball took place in the Hofburg palace.

A cornerstone was accomplished at the 8th Life Ball on May 13, 2000: it was the first time the funds raised broke the ATS 10,000,000 (EUR 726,728) barrier. It was also the first Ball at which the opening show took place on the city hall square and was publicly accessible. The next year, for the first time projects in Africa (cf. HIV/AIDS in Africa) were supported through a cooperation with the Elton John Aids Foundation (EJAF) – Elton John was himself a regular guest at the event from 2001 to 2005 and also held the opening speeches. The 13th Life Ball on May 21, 2005, for the first time exceeded the EUR 1 million mark with a total of EUR 1,017,600 generated by ticket sales, catering, auctions, raffle, stamp and record sales and the contributions of various donors and sponsors. Half of the proceeds are donated to international projects. Since 2006, the American Foundation for AIDS Research (amfAR), which was founded by Elizabeth Taylor and whose current president is Sharon Stone, has been a cooperation partner of the Life Ball. The main focus in 2006 was on the fight of HIV and AIDS in babies and toddlers.

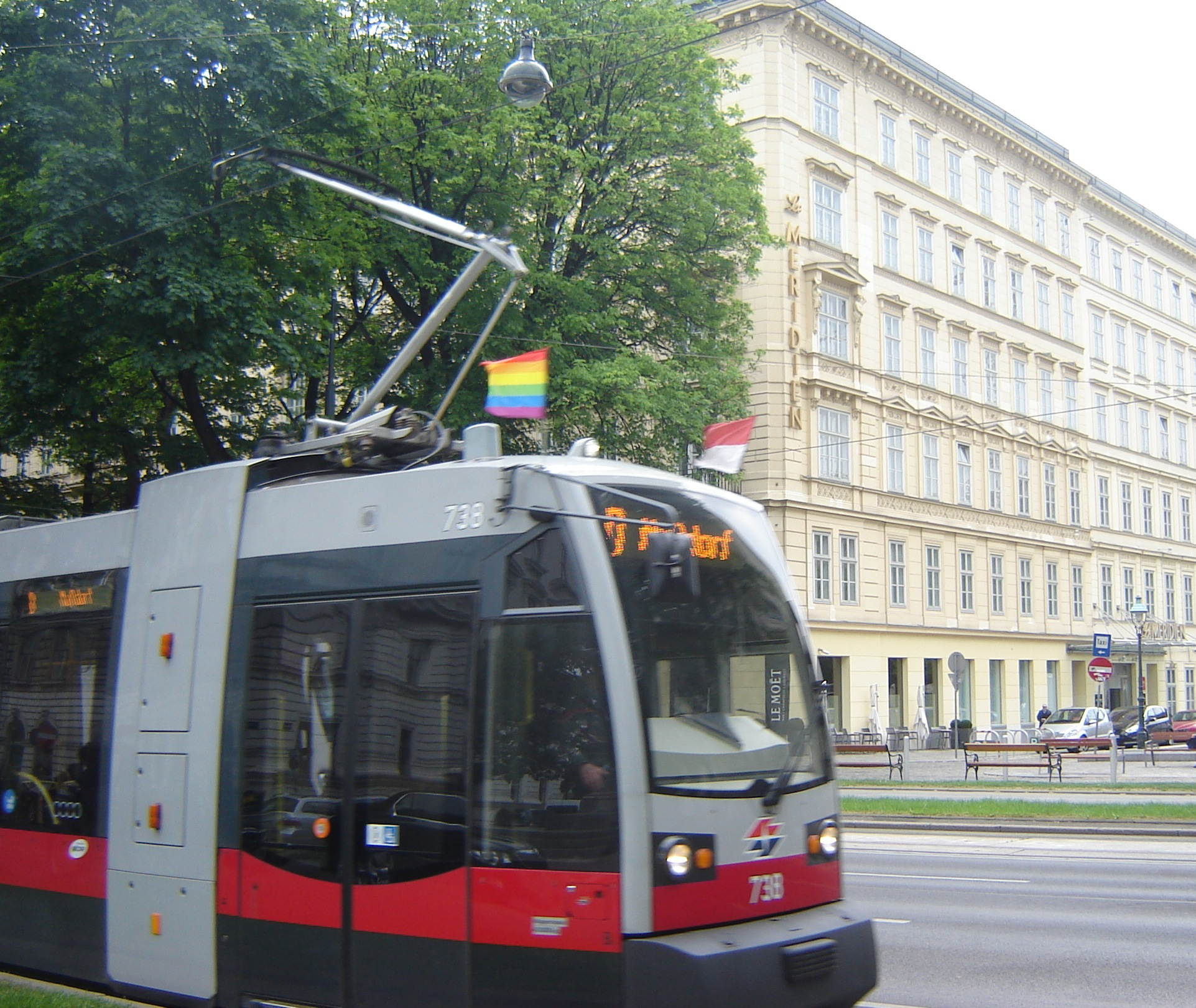
The municipality decorates all trams with rainbow flags during the four weeks of the Life Ball and the Vienna Pride parade.

Compared to today, the Life Ball started as a small event from the gay community. In contrast to other events attended by Keszler back then, it was never intended to be an event only for the gay scene or jet-setters. It combines Viennese ball tradition with fancy-costume queer balls. Some of the gay community supported the project greatly, especially when it was still in its infancy, e.g., Café Berg (since its opening). However, the Ball has attracted a majority of heterosexual guests for some time now, and also many companies make a contribution. To avoid the potential worst case – that gay people do not get tickets to an event which had its origins in the gay scene—the lesbian and gay community has had a ticket quota for some years. Even though the Life Ball has not been a mere "gay" event for some time, just as much as AIDS is no longer a "gay" epidemic, it still has this reputation. The attribute "gay" has, however, not been detrimental to revenue. When not discussed in the equal rights context, "gays are considered creative and fun—and are said to throw better parties", which is a money-making cliché. Moreover, trend expert Bernhard Heinzlmaier adds that "it is considered hip to move in a gay environment. It indicates an open and modern set of mind." In addition to the charity aspect, the "gay hipness" surrounding the heterosexual guests is therefore another reason for donations. The homosexuals in Austria alone would not be a big enough crowd to get companies to make such generous donations.

At least two celebrity couples met at the event: Austrian professional swimmer Markus Rogan and then Miss Austria Christine Reiler met at the 2007 Ball in which they both participated in the fashion show as models. At the Life Ball 2008, they celebrated their one-year anniversary and graced the runway in a partner-look outfit. The same night, TV presenter Nazan Eckes and Julian Khol, the Düsseldorf-based Austrian model, art student, and son of politician Andreas Khol, also met.

From 2000 to 2007, a wedding chapel for couples of any sexual orientation with famous "show priests" was hosted together with Austrian TV channel ATV to point out the unequal treatment of heterosexual and homosexual couples.

On the occasion of the XVIII International AIDS Conference that is beginning one day after the big event in Vienna, this year's Life Ball will be very special. On the 17th of July Europe's biggest AIDS charity event not only takes place in the Vienna City Hall and on City Hall Square, but also at the Burgtheater (the former imperial court theatre) and the Parliament. The "concept of the three houses" unites three extraordinary events and important organizations; the amfAR gala in the Parliament, the Elton John AIDS Foundation at the Red Ribbon Cotillion in the Burgtheater, and the William J. Clinton Foundation at the traditional Life Ball in the Vienna City Hall. With the support of many different personalities these three events together set a clear signal for tolerance and solidarity.

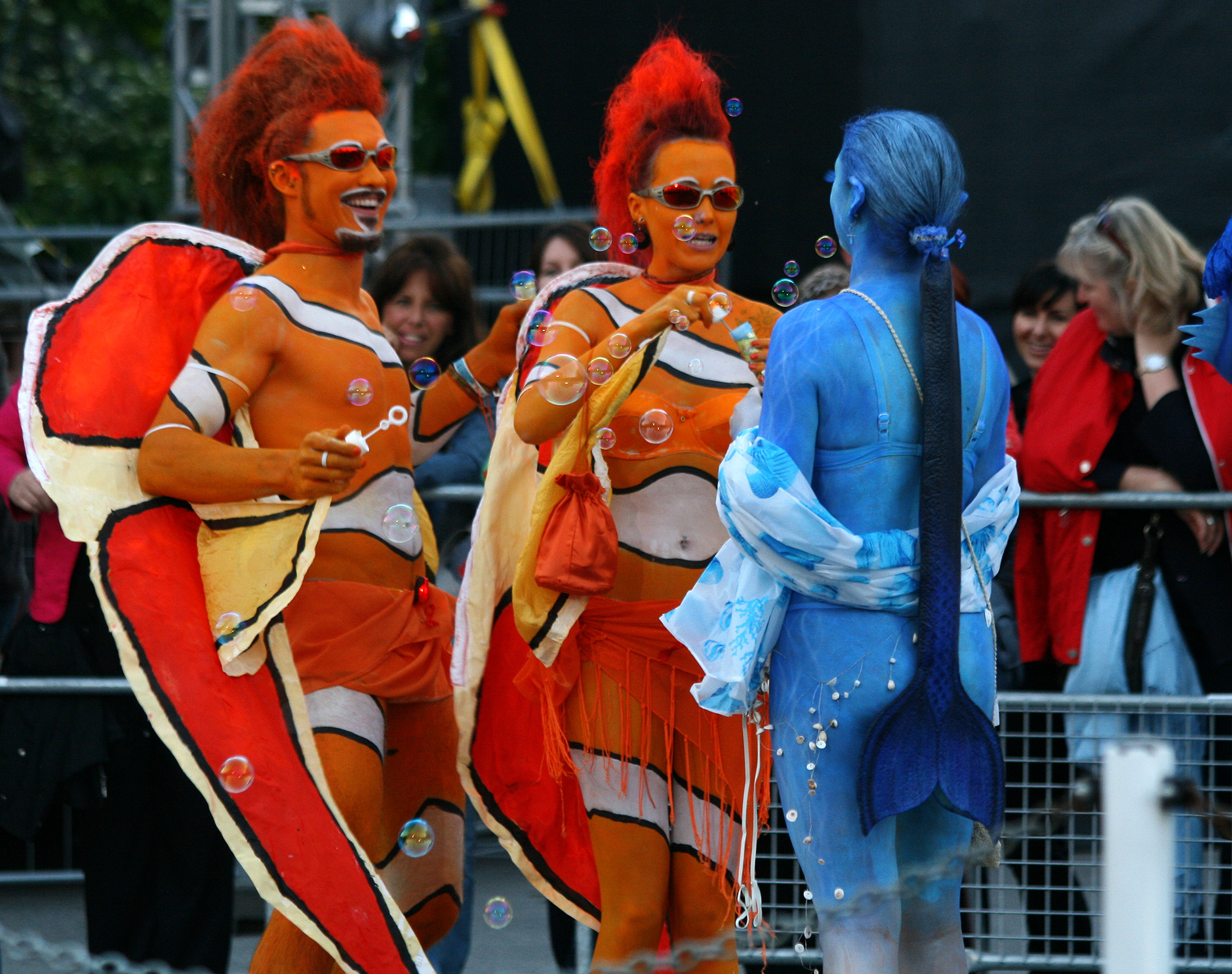
Visitors at Life Ball 2009

Access to the Life Ball is extremely limited. Each year, thousands of requests for Life Ball Tickets are received and few are granted to this exclusive experience. Recently, the Life Ball opened their doors to international guests who want to attend. A few international travel representatives have been selected to exclusively represent a region in offering travel packages to the Life Ball.

A notable event at the 2013 Life Ball was Barbara Eden appearing, wearing her Jeannie outfit.

In November 2015, Keszler said that there would be no Life Ball in 2016, and that the next ball would be held in the summer of 2017. However, the Red Ribbon Cotillion will still be held that year.

== Campaigns ==
The event is usually accompanied by a number of campaigns. In 2006, guests from western Austria could for the first time make use of a dedicated "Ö3 Life Ball Express" train with a special party carriage and shuttle buses that brought them to Vienna's city hall, and also the specially modified "Life Ball Party Plane" premiered in 2008, flying in guests and media representatives from New York City to Vienna, already setting the right mood for the Ball. The dance club Volksgarten, located not far from the Ball venue, hosts the Life Ball Party and the after hour in the early hours of the morning for all those who did not get tickets to the Ball itself. The money from these campaigns also goes to the Life Ball. Also, there is a "Diners Club Life Ball" credit card carrying the Red Ribbon design, which automatically transfers 0.5% of each transaction to AIDS LIFE.

=== Special issue stamps ===
Limited edition stamps on the occasion of the Life Ball have been issued for a number of years now. The 2005 stamp bore Heidi Klum's picture, followed by Naomi Campbell in 2006. In that year, also a limited edition of stamps featuring Naomi Campbell in comic style was sold on eBay. German supermodel Nadja Auermann was the face of the 2007 Life Ball stamps.

=== Life Ball Song ===
The performance of the Life Ball Song marks the official opening of the Ball.

- 2002: Live for the moment performed by Hot Pants Road Club, Dorretta Carter, Rounder Girls, Eddie Cole, Cedric Lee Bradley, Christian Kolonovits, and the Ambassade Orchester Wien
- 2003: High Life performed by Gianna, Loud 9, Sandra Pires, and Family Bizz
- 2004: Immer lauter (louder and louder) performed by Nina Hagen
- 2005: instead of the traditional song, the Vienna State Opera Ballet, choirs, singers and DJs performed an overture for the opening of the Ball in front of Vienna's city hall.
- 2006: Everything Can Change performed by Rebekka Bakken
- 2007: Get a Life – Get Alive, performed by Austrian casting show Starmania contestant Eric Papilaya, was also Austria's contribution to the Eurovision Song Contest.
- 2008: The Life performed by transgender icon Amanda Lepore, club host, show host and singer Mel Merio and Chicks on Speed
- 2009: I Bring You Love performed by Cindy Gomez together with composer Dave Stewart
- 2011: Ask the Universe performed by Cheyenne Jackson
- 2012: Melody Angel, Judith Hill, Truth Hurts und Natalia Kelly - Blindfold
- 2013: Love Wins Over Glamour performed by Adam Lambert
- 2014: Lust for Life performed by Candice Glover
- 2015: Love Child performed by Trevor Jackson

Since 2006, the Life Ball Fanfare, composed by Bela Fischer, has been played at the beginning of the opening show.

== Fashion show ==
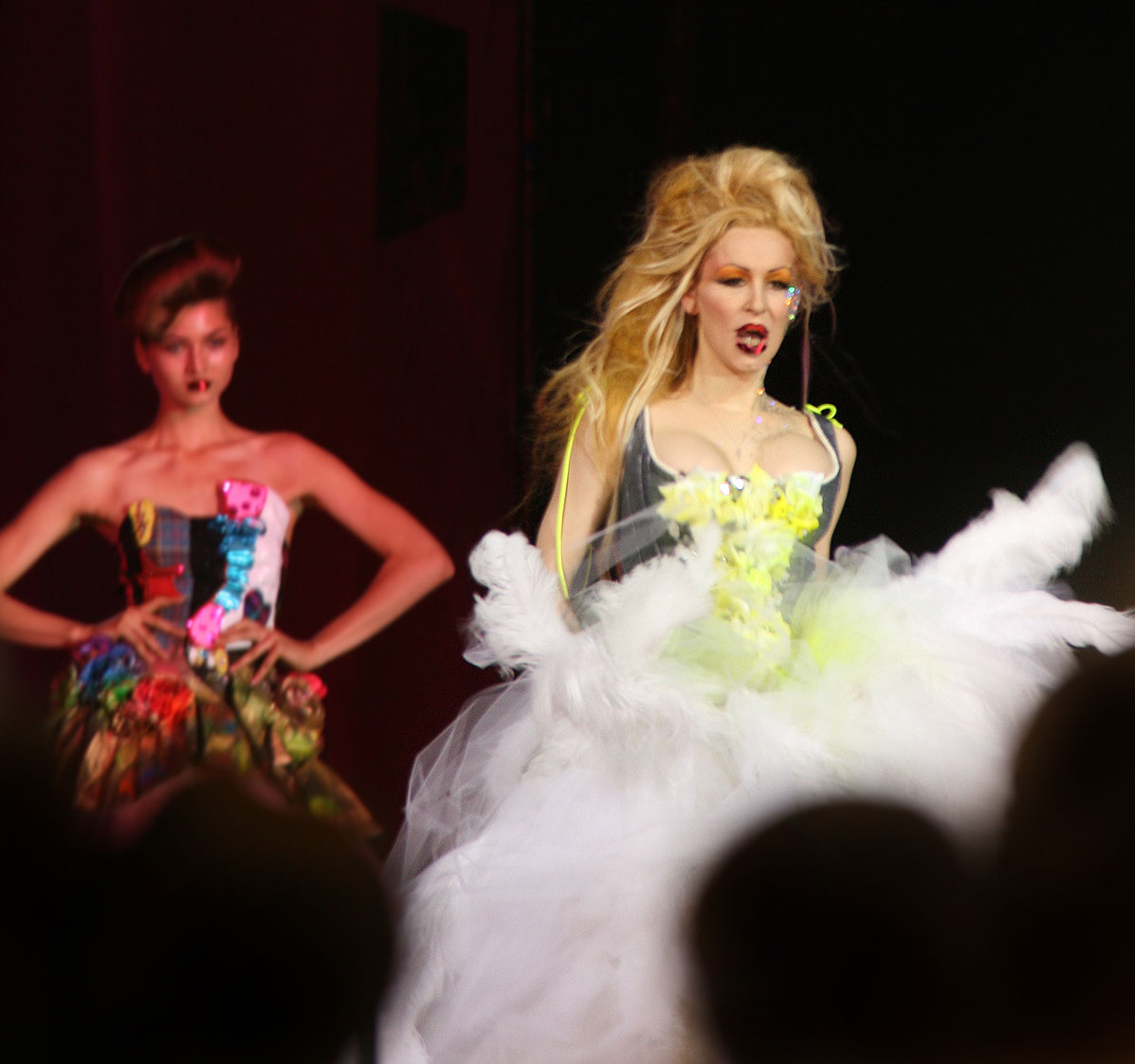
Heatherette-Fashion show (Life Ball 2007)

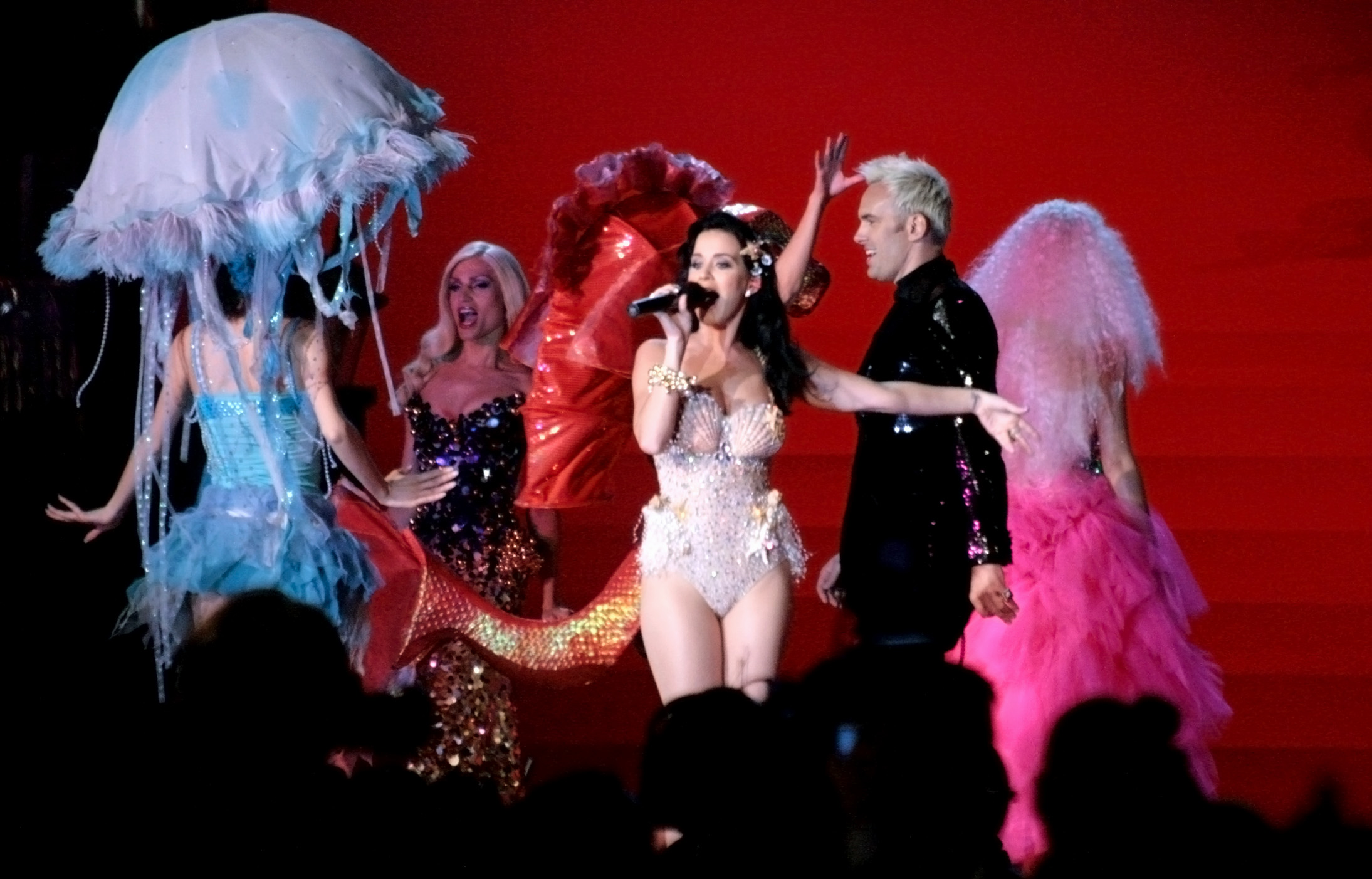
Katy Perry sings at the fashion show of The Blonds (Life Ball 2009).

Each year, one or more famous fashion designers are responsible for the event's fashion show. Professional models on the catwalk such as Marcus Schenkenberg, Alek Wek, Nadja Auermann, Heidi Klum, Eva Padberg, Eva Riccobono, and Naomi Campbell appear alongside stars and celebrities such as Udo Kier, Olivia Jones, Til Schweiger, Kylie Minogue, Cyndi Lauper, Dolly Buster, Austrian Health Minister Andrea Kdolsky.

Fashion designers since the inception of the Life Ball:

- 1993 - Thierry Mugler
- 1994 - John Galliano
- 1995 - Jean-Paul Gaultier
- 1996 - Paco Rabanne
- 1997 - Vivienne Westwood
- 1998 - Jean-Charles de Castelbajac
- 1999 - Christian Lacroix, Philip Treacy, Vivienne Westwood, Jeremy Scott, Paco Rabanne and Julien Macdonald
- 2000 - Walter Van Beirendonck, Olivier Theyskens, Seredin & Vasiliev, Shirtology and Benoit Méléard
- 2001 - Roberto Cavalli
- 2002 - Moschino
- 2003 - Missoni
- 2004 - Gianfranco Ferré
- 2005 - Donatella Versace
- 2006 - Renzo Rosso (Diesel)
- 2007 - Heatherette
- 2008 - Agent Provocateur
- 2009 - Patricia Field presents The Blonds
- 2010 - Calvin Klein, Kenneth Cole, Diane von Fürstenberg
- 2011 - DSquared²
- 2012 - VOGUE Italia hosts the 20th Anniversary Life Ball Fashion Show presented by MINI
- 2013 - Roberto Cavalli
- 2014 - Givenchy, Viktor & Rolf, Lanvin, Jean Paul Gaultier, Vivienne Westwood, Etro and DSquared² – under the direction of Franca Sozzani

== Crystal of Hope donated by Swarovski, designed by Darko Mladenovic ==
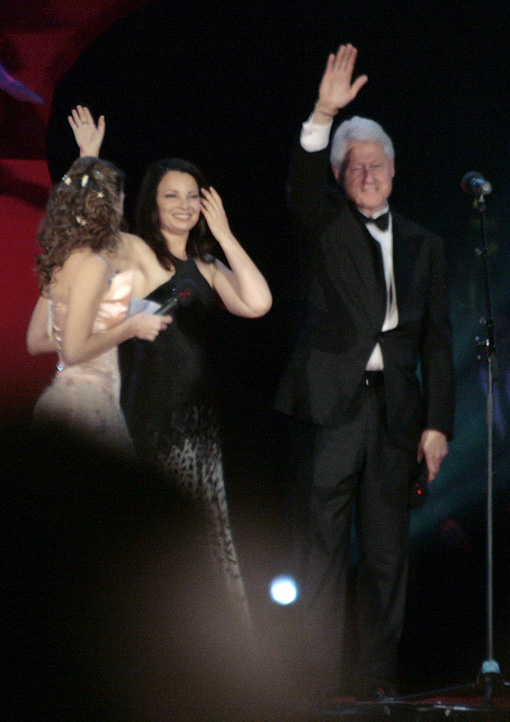
Fran Drescher and Bill Clinton (2009)

The annual award of the "Crystal of Hope donated by Swarovski" during the Ball's opening ceremony has become a fixed item on the program. The EUR 100,000 decoration has been presented by a celebrity or head of an AIDS organization to honor achievements in the field of HIV/AIDS research since 2005.

The Red Ribbon-shaped award is a tribute to extraordinary commitments in the fight against AIDS or outstanding AIDS projects of international partner organizations of AIDS Life.

- 2005: Treat Asia Project by the American Foundation for AIDS Research (amfAR) – presented by Minnelli
- 2006: SAMBA project by Médecins Sans Frontières – presented by Catherine Deneuve
- 2007: Youth2Youth Project Uganda by the German Foundation for World Population – presented by Vivienne Westwood
- 2008: Yier Nigma (choose life), a Kenyan project for the prevention of mother-to-child transmission of HIV by international humanitarian organization CARE – presented by Kim Cattrall
- 2009: Trevor Peter, for his year-long efforts for the Clinton Foundation's Access Programs, within which he cooperated with governments in Africa and the Caribbean to introduce HIV tests for diagnosing the population and for checking the effectiveness of medication – presented by Fran Drescher and Bill Clinton
- 2010: The Ukrainian NGO The Way Home (http://www.wayhome.org.ua/) and its founder Sergey Kostin, for helping street children, many of whom are HIV positive, in Odesa, Ukraine. The award was presented by Nastassja Kinski.
- 2011: The Andrey Rylkov Foundation for Health and Social Justice (http://rylkov-fond.org/) and its co-founder Anya Sarang for advocating for the protection of human rights of drug users and other vulnerable populations in the Russian Federation. The award was presented by Brooke Shields.
- 2012: Jackie Branfield, Founder Operation Bobbi Bear - presented by Naomi Campbell and Antonio Banderas

== Facts & themes ==
- Press = total number of accredited news and media journalists
- Radio = number of radio stations among press
- TV = number of TV stations among press, including internet TV programs

No	Year	Date	Slogan	Opening speech	Press	Radio	TV
1	1993	May 29	-	-	150	-	AUT & GER
2	1994	May 28	-	-	260	-	AUT & GER
3	1995	May 6	-	-	380	-	11
4	1996	May 11	-	-	430	7	15
5	1997	May 10	-	-	450	6	20
6	1998	May 9	-	-	530	22	20
7	1999	June 26	-	-	530	17	30
8	2000	May 13	-	-	600	30	35
9	2001	June 16	-	Elton John	~ 700	22	40
10	2002	May 19	A decade for Life, a decade against AIDS.	Elton John	~ 600	22	39
11	2003	May 24	Don't look back in anger, or forward in fear, but around in awareness.'	Neil Tennant; Elton John	500	16	44
12	2004	May 14	Agreeing to hope, gives life every chance.	Elton John; Luc Montagnier	500	16	63
13	2005	May 21	Vienna Rocks! Let Hope Infect the Virus.	Elton John	500	14	64
14	2006	May 20	A Choir of Love against an Army of Ignorance. (operetta)	Sharon Stone	500	11	62
15	2007	May 26	Once upon a time (there was a princess called hope) (fairy tale)	Sharon Stone	500	13	65
16	2008	May 17	Love is infinite. Life is universal. (Landing on planet Life Ball) (aliens, utopia)	Sharon Stone	500		60
17	2009	May 16	Let Love flow! '(Four elements - water; beginning of life, „baroque water castle")	Eva Longoria	500		60
18	2010	July 17	Sow the seeds of Solidarity! (Four elements - earth; nutrition) (Opening event for the International Aids Conference in Vienna from 18 to 23 July)	Whoopi Goldberg, Bill Clinton, David Furnish	500		
19	2011	May 21	(Four elements - air)				
20	2012		(Four elements - fire)				

Since 1995, when Paris Premiere and a Spanish TV station joined the media crowd, the Life Ball has been broadcast on a pan-European level. In 1999, American TV stations (besides MTV) made the broadcast intercontinental. Internet TV started reporting on the event in 2001. Since 2002, stricter accreditation criteria have been applied and the number of media representatives has been limited to 500 due to capacity restrictions. In 2004, the first South African TV teams reported live from the Ball.

Except for one Sunday in 2002, the Ball has always taken place on a Saturday. And apart from a short stint at Hofburg palace in 1999 due to renovations, the venue of the Ball has always been Vienna's city hall. Since 2000, the opening ceremony and the fashion show have taken place on the square in front of the city hall. The opening speech has been held by international celebrities since 2001.

== Amount donated ==
The Life Ball is the most important source of income for AIDS LIFE. Since its inception, margins from annual proceeds and from the total sum of subsidized projects have been profitably invested to be able to finance national projects for another year, should the Life Ball have to be canceled one year. As proceeds are impossible to forecast, the organization does not finance infrastructure costs of the projects it supports, such as rent, personnel expenses, and operating costs. A failure of AIDS LIFE to produce financial support must not result in the cancellation of a project.

Year	Sponsors	Net proceeds in EUR	Donations to projects in EUR		Supported international projects
Year	Sponsors	Life Ball	national	international	Supported international projects
1993	3	63,193.98	41,685.14 -	-	-
1994		167,365.31	111,763.65	-	-
1995		240,149.12	143,448.77	-	-
1996	130	335,598.50	289,026.98	-	-
1997	140	323,789.07	224,575.07	-	-
1998	135	516,731.42	317,103.29	-	-
1999	150	691,084.00	325,276.25	25,944.20	Austrian charity Nachbar in Not "Austrian Village" in Turkey
2000	185	684,942.00	398,493.64	-	-
2001	190	558,392.33	347,735.02	420,875.42	Elton John AIDS Foundation
2002	179	750,470.00	473,238.27	272,000.00	Elton John AIDS Foundation
2003	199	739,472.83	434,067.44	374,145.85	Elton John AIDS Foundation
2004	184	938,621.04	497,183.65	406,283.94	Elton John AIDS Foundation
2005	215	1,089.705.81	452,696.43	607,005.42	Crystal of Hope; Elton John AIDS Foundation amfAR
2006	217	1,076.547.86	486,638.88	685,988.42	Crystal of Hope; Impilo Südafrika amfAR (TREAT Asia Projekt)
2007	280	1,821.139.53	522,759.59	1,343.687.71	Crystal of Hope amfAR (TREAT Asia Projekt); Clinton Foundation HIV/AIDS (CHAI)
2008	188	1,845.028.06	490,551.24	655,000.00	Crystal of Hope amfAR (TREAT Asia Projekt); German AIDS Foundation (DREAM Mozambique)
2009		1,640.181.66			

On May 24, 2007, two days before the Life Ball, a formal dinner with Bill Clinton which was also attended by Austrian President Heinz Fischer and then Austrian Chancellor Alfred Gusenbauer was held in the Great Gallery of Schönbrunn Palace. With the support of major Austrian companies, the total amount of donations could be raised even further. After dinner, guests enjoyed the Concert for Europe played by the Vienna Philharmonic in the palace's park and a check worth US$1 million was presented to Clinton for the HIV/AIDS initiative (CHAI) of his William J. Clinton Foundation. The same program was planned for 2008 but had to be canceled because Clinton was busy with the US primaries.

Since 2008, nine full-time employees of the Life Ball have worked on the acquisition of donations in money and kind and coordinated all volunteers and participants over the course of a year. There are almost 1,000 partners and staff for catering alone.[10] A special audit of finances from 1994 to 2008 by auditing firm Hübner & Hübner in 2009 confirmed Life Ball's proper financial conduct. At a press conference, Andreas Röthlin also made it clear that "as opposed to many other charitable organizations, AIDS LIFE is very efficiently managed, also and especially with regard to expenses." At this occasion, AIDS LIFE also received the "Österreichisches Spendengütesiegel" (Reg. Nr. 05685), a quality seal for NPOs awarded by the Austrian auditors' chamber, valid as of August 24, 2009.

== Awards ==
- 1997: Austrian tourism prize (Austrian Federal Economic Chamber)
- 1997: Event Award GOLD - category "Event Marketing" (Eventwerkstatt: Austrian Event Award)
- 1999: ÖKI Fundraising & Social Marketing Prize GOLD
- 2000: special award by then Austrian Federal Ministry of Economic Affairs and Labour for the commercial spot series of the Austrian State Prize, for the 1999 spot "Life Ball 99"
- 2003: Gery Keszler: Communicator of the Year 2002 (public relations association Austria)
- 2003: Flair de Parfum (Austrian Federal Economic Chamber – retail in perfume products)
- 2004: Event Award GOLD - category "Public Event" (Eventwerkstatt: Austrian Event Award)
- 2005: Project Management Institute – "Project Excellence & Innovation" for humanitarian commitment
- 2006: Gery Keszler: Gold Decoration of the City of Vienna
- 2006: Event Award GOLD - category "Public Event" (Eventwerkstatt: Austrian Event Award)
- 2008: Gery Keszler: Gold Decoration for Services Rendered to the Republic of Austria
- 2012: Gery Keszler: Reminders Day Award, Berlin / Germany
- 2012: Gery Keszler: HOPE Award, Dresden / Germany

== Criticism ==
"Because Gery Keszler's 14th AIDS charity night was indeed great. But: that does not mean anything, as it is an intrinsic characteristic of the Life Ball to be super. In all spheres: the Life Ball is beyond criticism. Reporting about it means cheering, which is, to an extent, justified."

– Der Standard, May 21, 2006

"Some political gay rights activists and "fundamentalists" are skeptical about the way the idea and the ball are turned into a lifestyle and are diluted, but nobody speaks up to voice criticism." Gery Keszler is well aware of the delicate balancing act between the fun factor, which in turn attracts people and companies, creates publicity and, eventually, collects as much in donations as possible, and the message to be conveyed. For instance, only journalists who have reported not only about celebrities but also about HIV and AIDS are accredited again. Sometimes it is criticized+ that by now also certain conservative and/or right-wing politicians show up as guests or announce to attend the Ball. Keszler believes that a ball against discrimination should not discriminate against anyone. If these people manage to secure a ticket and believe they would enjoy the event, they will certainly not be stopped from attending it. And Keszler regards their potential plan of ganging up and making "all well" again as naïve.
