= Norman Leto =

Polish painter, film director

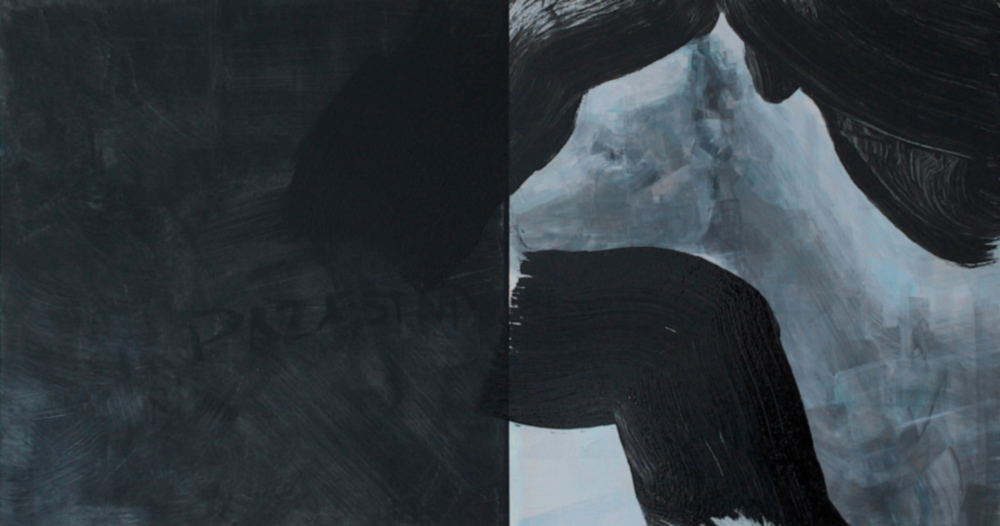
Dog. Painting by Norman Leto

Norman Leto (born August 23, 1980, Bochnia, Poland), birth name Łukasz Banach, is a Polish artist, self-educated in the fields of painting, film, and new media. In 1989, at the age of nine, Banach started to use the computer as a digital drawing tool. At the age of fourteen (1994) he created his first moving pictures using 16-bit computers while also developing "analog" skills with drawing, painting, and traditional animation techniques. At the age of nineteen, long before taking the alias of "Norman Leto", he became friends with the well-known Polish painter Zdzisław Beksiński. The six-year-long friendship was broken by Beksiński’s murder in February 2005. One year later, while living in Kraków, Poland, Banach took the pseudonym of Norman Leto; his debut solo exhibition took place at the Center of Contemporary Art in Warsaw in 2007. The same year he worked with the director Krystian Lupa on "Factory Two", where his job was to prepare video sequences shown during the performance. In 2009 and 2010, Leto was a resident in New York, working on his autobiographical novel “Sailor”; he simultaneously completed a full-length film of the same title. Fully financed by the author, the film was well received at the 10th Era New Horizons Film Festival in Poland (2010), screened as part of the "New Cinema" section. Despite the authors' initial lack of interest in official, external producers or distributors, "Sailor" has been screened worldwide at art-house film festivals and in modern art institutions.

In 2010 Norman moved to Warsaw. While new series of paintings continued to emerge, work on a second feature film "Photon" started. The film depicts the story of life as a phenomenon, and premiered at international documentary film festivals CPH:DOX, Copenhagen 2017 (European premiere) and HotDocs, Toronto 2017 (American premiere). The Polish premiere took place at the 17th T-Mobile New Horizons IFF, Wrocław, as part of the main competition. Around January 2017, Norman started work on another feature screenplay titled "Pilot". The plot is a rendition of events which took place September 11, 2001, told from the unique perspective of an actual military interceptor pilot. In May 2017 Leto appeared in the music video for Radiohead's "Promise", released in June that year.

== Filmography ==
- 2010: "Sailor", 100 min. (http://www.imdb.com/title/tt2007453/)
- 2016: "Photon", 107 min
