= Rosabell Laurenti Sellers =

Italian-American actress

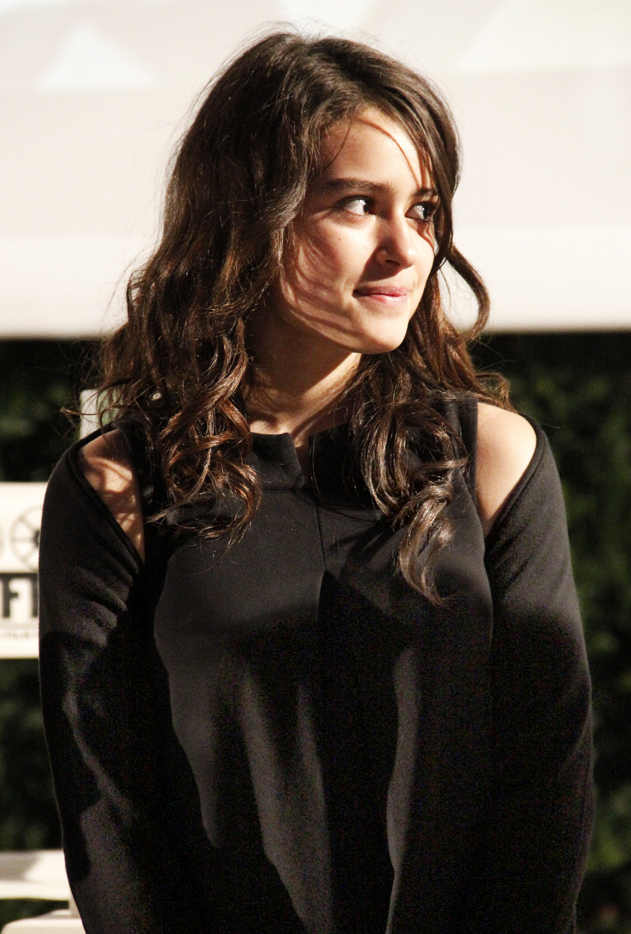
- Sellers in 2013
- Born: March 27, 1996 (age 30); Santa Monica, California, U.S.
- Citizenship: American; Italian
- Occupation: Actress
- Years active: 1999–present

Rosabell Laurenti Sellers (born March 27, 1996) is an American-Italian actress. She is best known for her roles as the titular character in the children's series Mia and Me and Tyene Sand in the television series Game of Thrones.

== Early life ==
Sellers was born in Santa Monica, California, to the Italian filmmaker Fabrizio Laurenti and the American actress Mary Sellers. She grew up in New York City before moving to Rome. She has one brother and one sister.

== Career ==
Sellers made her debut in the theater in 2004 at the age of eight, when she and her brother were assigned to the part of the children of Medea in the production of the theater company La Mama. After staging in New York and a tour of the same show in Poland and Austria, she moved briefly to Rome that same year with her family.

After she arrived in Italy, she began to take part in TV and film productions. In 2006 she participated in the mini-series directed by Maurizio Ponzi's E poi c'è Filippo, the years following in L'amore e la guerra, the television series Medicina generale and the television movie Fuga per la libertà – L'aviatore, the miniseries Coco Chanel and the film Mi Ricordo Anna Frank in the lead role. In 2009, in Fausto Brizzi's Many Kisses Later, while the following year in the miniseries Paura di amare.

In 2010, Sellers played the daughter of Kathryn Bolkovac (Rachel Weisz) in Larysa Kondracki's The Whistleblower. In 2012, she took part in the TV series Una grande famiglia and arrived on Rai 2 in the series Mia and Me that features alternating sequences in live action and scenes created in computer graphics. In June 2012 she took a part in Edoardo Leo's Out of the Blue, alongside Raoul Bova. Meanwhile, at the 69th Venice International Film Festival, she was presented in Ivano De Matteo's Balancing Act and in A Liberal Passion, alongside Alessandro Preziosi and Valentina Lodovini, loosely based on the 2008 novel by Chiara Gamberale.

In 2015, she joined the cast of the HBO series Game of Thrones in Season 5 as Tyene Sand.

In 2020, she joined the cast of the SyFy series Spides as Nora Berger.

== Personal life ==
As of March 2017, Sellers is studying at the Guildhall School of Music and Drama in London. Sellers has participated in many equestrian competitions and has also studied tap dance. Sellers is fluent in English and Italian.

Sellers founded the Young Actors for Humanitarian Involvement, to get teen Italian talents involved in charities such as ActionAid and Smile Again. She also serves meals at Rome's Comunità di Sant'Egidio soup kitchen. Sellers also has volunteered with another organization called Veto the Squito which helps raise money for insecticide treated bed nets in Africa.

== Filmography ==
=== Film ===
Year	Title	Role	Notes
2009	Many Kisses Later	Barbra	
2010	Cocapop	Young Laura	
2010	The Whistleblower	Erin	
2011	Women vs. Men	Flavia	
2011	Loon Lake	Rosy	
2011	This Property Is Condemned	Unknown	Short Film
2012	Balancing Act	Camilla	Nominated—David di Donatello for Best Supporting Actress
2013	Out of the Blue	Layla Brighi	
2013	A Liberal Passion	Angelica	
2014	The Dinner	Benedetta	
2019	Trading Paint	Cindy	
2024	What About Love	Young Girl	

=== Television ===
Year	Title	Role	Notes
1999	A Wheel in Time	Unknown	Television film
2006	E poi c'è Filippo	Unknown	
2007	L'amore e la guerra	Anita	
2008	Fuga per la libertà – L'aviatore	Nicoletta	Television film; credited as Rosabell Laurenti
2008	Coco Chanel	Coco Chanel (12 years old)	
2009	Medicina generale	Rebecca	Episode: "Incontri"
2009	Mi ricordo Anna Frank	Anne Frank	Television film
2010	Paura di amare	Carlotta Loi	Main role (season 1)
2011	Agata e Ulisse	Milla	Television film
2011	Cenerentola	Aurora (13 years old)	2 episodes
2011–2015	Mia and Me	Mia Marconi	Lead live-action and voice role (season 1–2)
2012–2013	Una grande famiglia	Valentina Rengoni	Main role (season 1–2)
2012–2013	Wild Kratts	Matrioshika Girl	(Season 2)
2015–2017	Game of Thrones	Tyene Sand	Recurring role, 9 episodes
2020	Spides	Nora Berger	Main role
2022	Willow	Lili	Recurring role, 2 episodes
2023	The Swarm	Alicia Delaware	
