= Eva Riccobono =

Italian model, actress and TV presenter

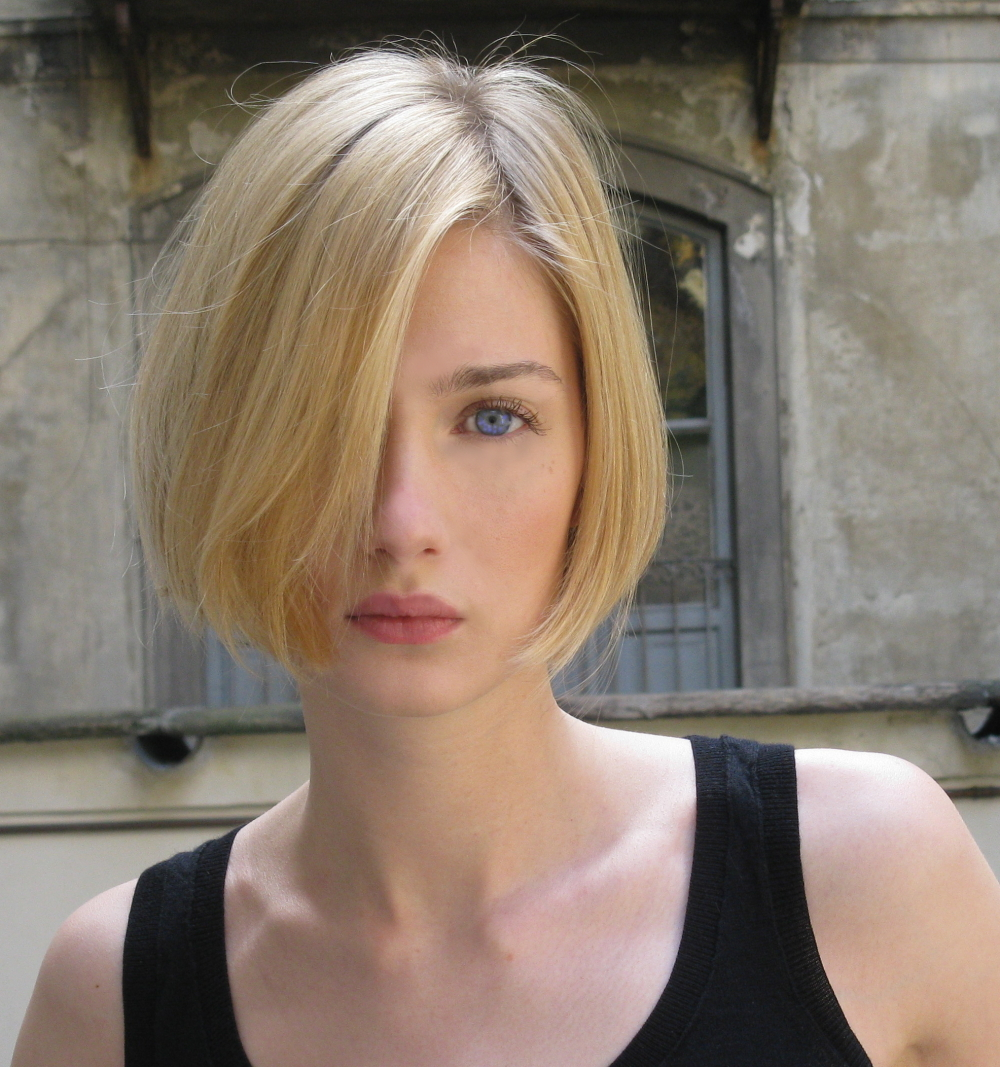
- Born: 7 February 1983 (age 43); Palermo, Sicily, Italy
- Occupations: Model, actress, presenter
- Years active: Model (2001–present); Actress (2008–present)
- Children: 2
- Modeling information
- Height: 5 ft 11 in (1.80 m)
- Hair color: Blonde
- Eye color: Blue
- Agency: Women Management (Milan); Marilyn Agency (Paris)

Eva Riccobono (born 7 February 1983) is an Italian model, actress, and television presenter.

== Early life ==
Riccobono was born in Palermo, Sicily, the daughter of an Italian father and a German mother. She has three older sisters. Riccobono began modeling in Sicily before moving to Milan at the age of 18, where she pursued her fashion career and appeared in two Italian music videos. In 2002 she made her television debut after being scouted by Fiorello for his RAI show Stasera Pago Io ("Tonight I'll Pay"), which hosted many international stars such as Joe Cocker, Lenny Kravitz and Celine Dion.

== Career ==
=== Modeling ===
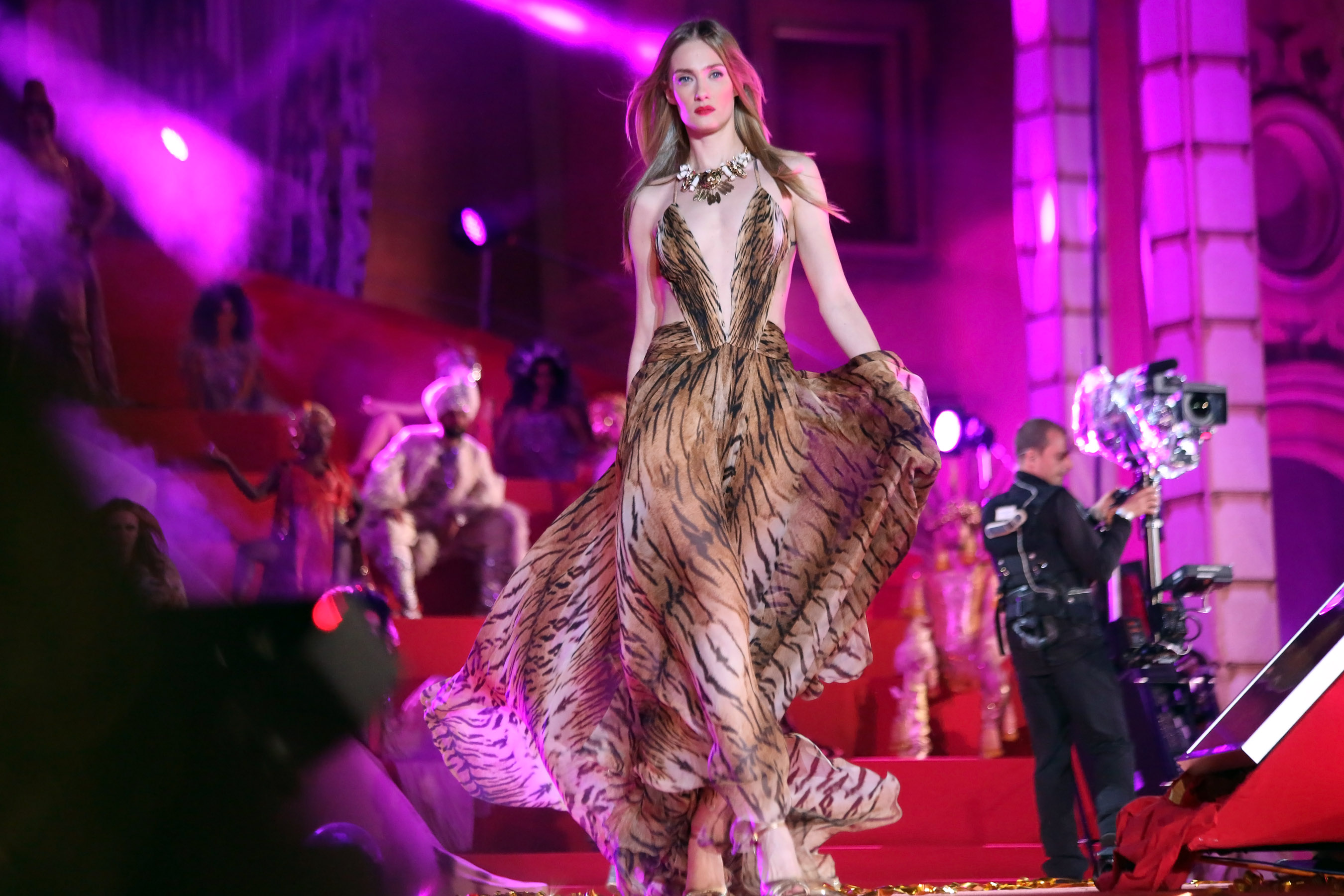
Eva Riccobono, Cavalli fashion show at Life Ball 2013

Riccobono was first photographed by Marco Glaviano, who saw her in Sicily. In 2002 she entered a contract with Dolce & Gabbana which gave her the D&G S/S 2003 campaign shot by Mario Testino alongside supermodel Naomi Campbell. Then Bruce Weber photographed her for the 2003 Pirelli Calendar. She has since modelled for designers such as Giorgio Armani, Chanel, Valentino, Gianfranco Ferré, Emanuel Ungaro and many others. She has worked for photographers including Miles Aldridge, David Bailey, Gilles Bensimon, Patrick Demarchelier, Arthur Elgort, Annie Leibovitz, Peter Lindbergh, Craig McDean, Paolo Roversi and Ellen von Unwerth posing for the covers of Elle, Vogue, Glamour, Vanity Fair in their international editions.

She walked for the likes of Oscar de la Renta, Chanel, Alexander McQueen, Lanvin, Balmain, Fendi, Alberta Ferretti, Jeremy Scott, Vivienne Westwood and many mores. She appeared featured in campaigns for Chanel beauty, Sonia Rykiel, L'Oreal, Gianfranco Ferré, Trussardi, Celine, La Perla to name a few.

Riccobono posed for Lavazza Calendar 2009, with photographs of Annie Leibovitz. She has been the face of Argentovivo campaign by Marco Glaviano, and testimonial for Swarovski in 2012. She was also engaged to present a commercial for new Sky Channel High Life TV, about luxury and lifestyle.

During the 2011 Cannes Film Festival Riccobono walked for the fund-raising show Fashion for Relief, founded by friend Naomi Campbell and Franca Sozzani to benefit victims of the Tōhoku earthquake and tsunami.

=== Television and films ===
Riccobono debuted in television as a presenter in the 2002 program Stasera Pago Io alongside Fiorello. Seven years later, Fiorello called her for another of his show, Il Più Grande Spettacolo Dopo il Weekend ("The Greatest Show After The Weekend"). She presented in 2012 a scientific divulgation programme for Rai 2 entitled Eva.

In 2004, she starred in the short film Eva, by Italian artist and filmmaker Valerio Rocco Orlando, a conceptual story shot on the Hudson River. When she was famous as a model, Riccobono was hosted by television programmes on MTV, Rai 1, LA 3, and in the jury of Miss Italia 2011.

Her first movie role came aged 25 in 2008 Carlo Verdone's comedy Grande, Grosso e Verdone ("Big, Large and Verdone"). In this film she portrays Blanche, the main character's dream woman.

In 2012, she played the part of a toxic prostitute in And They Call It Summer, winner at the Rome Film Festival. For her performance in Marco Ponti's A Liberal Passion, Riccobono in 2013 won a Golden Ciak for Best Supporting Actress and got a nomination for the Silver Ribbon. In the same year she is in the movie Niente può fermarci ("Nothing Can Stop Us"), a comedy about the juvenile fears for the future. She recently shot La Vita Oscena ("The Obscene Life"), Renato De Maria's film adaptation of the homonym tale by writer Aldo Nove.

Riccobono hosted the opening and closing nights of the 70th Venice International Film Festival, with Bernardo Bertolucci as president.

== Personal life ==
From 2004 to 2005 Riccobono lived, worked and studied in New York City. She currently resides between London and Milan with her boyfriend, sound designer Matteo Ceccarini. The couple has a son, Leo, born in 2014, and a daughter, Livia, born in 2020.

== Filmography ==
=== Films ===
Year	Title	Role(s)	Notes
2008	Grande, grosso e... Verdone	Blanche Duvall	
2011	They Call It Summer	The Prostitute	
2013	A Liberal Passion	Simonetta	
2013	Niente può fermarci	Gloria	
2013	White Shadow	None	Associate producer
2014	La vita oscena	The Nurse	
2015	Io che amo solo te	Daniela	
2016	La cena di Natale	Daniela	

=== Television ===
Year	Title	Role(s)	Notes
2012	Eva	Herself / Host	Talk show
2013	Venice Film Festival 2013	Herself / Host	Annual ceremony
2019	Made in Italy	Antonia	Recurring role; 4 episodes
