= Mi Ricordo Anna Frank =

2010 Italian television film about Anne Frank, directed by Alberto Negrin

Mi Ricordo Anna Frank (English title: Memories of Anne Frank) is a 2009 Italian television film directed by Alberto Negrin. The movie was based on the 1997 book Memories of Anne Frank: Reflections of a Childhood Friend written by Alison Leslie Gold about the friendship between Anne Frank and Hanneli Goslar.

== Plot ==
The film is about diarist Anne Frank and her friendship with Hanneli Goslar. In 1935, Anne and Hanneli, both of whom were little children, meet at their first day of the school. From that moment, they become very good friends and their friendship continues until 1942, when Anne and her family go to hiding. A few months after Anne and her family go to hiding, the Goslars are arrested by the Nazis. Hanneli, after being deported to the Bergen-Belsen concentration camp, is reunited with Anne, who is a more unprivileged prisoner of the camp imprisoned in the other side of the camp, which is separated by an electric-wired fence from the side where Hanneli is imprisoned.

== Cast ==
- Rosabell Laurenti Sellers as Anne Frank
- Emilio Solfrizzi as Otto Frank
- Moni Ovadia as Rabbino
- Mari Nagy as Edith Frank
- Gaspar Meses as Peter van Pels
- Csilla Bakonyi as Miep Gies
- Panna Szurdi as Hanneli Goslar
