= A Liberal Passion =

- Italian: Passione sinistra
- Directed by: Marco Ponti
- Written by: Marco Ponti; Elisa Amoruso; Francesca Manieri
- Produced by: Donatella Botti
- Starring: Valentina Lodovini; Alessandro Preziosi; Vinicio Marchioni; Eva Riccobono; Geppi Cucciari; Jirij Ferrini
- Cinematography: Vladan Radovic
- Music by: Gigi Meroni
- Release date: 11 April 2013
- Running time: 90 minutes
- Country: Italy
- Language: Italian

A Liberal Passion (Italian: Passione sinistra) is a 2013 Italian comedy film co-written and directed by Marco Ponti. It is loosely based on the novel Passione sinistra by Chiara Gamberale. For her performance Eva Riccobono was nominated for Nastro D'Argento for best supporting actress.

== Plot ==
Nina and Bernardo live together. The first is an idealist, fixated on politics and decidedly leftist, convinced that everything she does can guarantee a better world. The second is an intellectual and writer, but destined to make the "eternal promise" for life. At the same time, Giulio, arrogant and indifferent, is engaged to Simonetta, a blonde dazed who sometimes stumbles on the subjunctives. Nina and Giulio casually meet and from the first moment they hate each other; in fact each sees the world with different eyes than the other. The boundary between love and hate, however, is very blurred and so they are overwhelmed by passion. All this brings into play the beliefs and ideals of two people who should be natural enemies.

== Cast ==
- Valentina Lodovini as Nina
- Alessandro Preziosi as Giulio
- Vinicio Marchioni as Bernardo
- Eva Riccobono as Simonetta
- Geppi Cucciari as Martina
- Jurij Ferrini as Serge
- Glen Blackhall as Andrea Splendore
- Rosabell Laurenti Sellers as Angelica
- Mao as Barman
- Marco Travaglio as himself

== See also ==
- List of Italian films of 2013
