= Minnelli =

Minnelli (also spelled Minelli) is an Italian surname. Notable people with the surname include:

- Minelli (born Luisa Ionela Luca, 1988), Romanian singer, songwriter and lyricist.
- Alessandro Minelli, multiple people
- Liza Minnelli (born 1946), American actress, dancer, and singer
- Ludwig Minelli (1932–2025), Swiss lawyer and euthanasia activist
- Pablo Minelli (born 1969), Argentine swimmer
- Rubens Minelli (1928–2023), Brazilian former football player and manager
- Simone Minelli (born 1997), Italian football forward
- Stefano Minelli (born 1994), Italian football goalkeeper
- Vincente Minnelli (1903–1986), American film director
