= They Call It Summer =

- Directed by: Paolo Franchi
- Starring: Jean-Marc Barr; Isabella Ferrari
- Music by: Philippe Sarde
- Production companies: Pavarotti International 23 s.r.l. Fondo MIBAC; Apulia Film Commission; Fondo Cinema e Audiovisivo
- Distributed by: Officine Ubu (Italy)
- Release dates: 14 November 2012 (Rome Film Festival); 22 November 2012 (Italy)
- Running time: 89 minutes
- Country: Italy

They Call It Summer (Italian: E la chiamano estate) is a 2012 Italian romance-drama film directed by Paolo Franchi. In spite of having been almost unanimously panned by critics, it won the awards for Best Director and for Best Actress (to Isabella Ferrari) at the 2012 Rome International Film Festival.

== Cast ==
- Jean-Marc Barr as Dino
- Isabella Ferrari as Anna
- Filippo Nigro as the swinger
- Eva Riccobono as the prostitute
- Luca Argentero as Alessandro
- Romina Carrisi as Chiara
- Maurizio Donadoni as Carlo
