= White Shadow (film) =

- Film poster
- Directed by: Noaz Deshe
- Written by: Noaz Deshe; James Masson
- Produced by: Noaz Deshe; Ginevra Elkann; Babak Jalali; Matthias Luthardt; Francesco Melzi d'Eril; Matteo Ceccarini; Eva Riccobono; Alexander Wadouh
- Starring: Hamisi Bazili; James Gayo; Glory Mbayuwayu; Salum Abdallah
- Cinematography: Noaz Deshe; Armin Dierolf
- Edited by: Noaz Deshe; Xavier Box; Robin Hill; Nico Leunen
- Music by: James Masson; Noaz Deshe
- Production companies: Asmara Films; Shadoworks; Mocajo Film production
- Release date: September 2, 2013 (Venice Film Festival)
- Running time: 115 minutes
- Countries: Germany; Italy; Tanzania
- Language: Swahili

White Shadow is a 2013 internationally co-produced drama film written, produced and directed by Noaz Deshe. An international co-production between Germany, Italy and Tanzania, the film premiered in Critics’ Week selection at the 70th Venice International Film Festival on September 2, 2013. It won the Lion of the Future award at the festival.

The film later premiered in-competition in the World Cinema Dramatic Competition at 2014 Sundance Film Festival on January 17, 2014. The film also screened at 2014 San Francisco International Film Festival on May 4, 2014. Ryan Gosling along with Matteo Ceccarini and Eva Riccobono served as the executive producers of the film.

== Plot ==
Alias, a young Albino, is on the run from the local doctors, who are hunting Albinos to use their body parts for potions.

== Cast ==
- Hamisi Bazili as Alias
- James Gayo as Kosmos
- Glory Mbayuwayu as Antoinette
- Salum Abdallah as Salum
- Riziki Ally as Mother
- John S. Mwakipunda as Anulla
- Tito D. Ntanga as Father
- James P. Salala as Adin

== Reception ==
White Shadow received mostly positive reviews from critics. Guy Lodge of Variety, said in his review that "Noaz Deshe makes a staggering debut with this drama about the African albino multi trade." Boyd van Hoeij in his review for The Hollywood Reporter said that "This harrowing account of a young albino's fight for survival in Tanzania is too long but nonetheless often gripping." Jessica Kiang of Indiewire grade the film B+ and praised the film by saying that "We have to admit, it first took a lot of our patience, and then all of our nerve, to make it through to the end, but that simply makes it a film that is exactly as upsetting as its subject matter warrants."

== Accolades ==
Year	Award	Category	Recipient	Result
2014	Sundance Film Festival	World Cinema Grand Jury Prize: Dramatic	Noaz Deshe	Nominated
2014	Venice Film Festival	Lion of the future	Noaz Deshe	Won
2014	San Francisco International Film Festival	New Directors Prize - Special mention	Noaz Deshe	Won
2014	New Horizons Film Festival	Grand Prix	Noaz Deshe	Won
