= Alessandro Minelli =

Alessandro Minelli may refer to:

- Alessandro Minelli (biologist), Italian biologist and professor emeritus of zoology at the University of Padova
- Alessandro Minelli (footballer, born 1970), Swiss football defender
- Alessandro Minelli (footballer, born 1999), Italian football player
