= The Metamorphosis of Birds =

- Directed by: Catarina Vasconcelos
- Screenplay by: Catarina Vasconcelos
- Produced by: Pedro Fernandes Duarte, Joana Gusmão, Catarina Vasconcelos
- Starring: Manuel Rosa, Ana Vasconcelos, Henrique Vasconcelos, Inês Melo Campos, João Móra, Catarina Vasconcelos, Cláudia Varejão, José Manuel Mendes, João Pedro Mamede
- Cinematography: Paulo Menezes
- Edited by: Francisco Moreira, Catarina Vasconcelos
- Music by: Madalena Palmeirim
- Production company: Primeira Idade
- Distributed by: Portugal Film
- Release date: February 27, 2020 (Berlinale)
- Running time: 101 minutes
- Country: Portugal
- Language: Portuguese
- Budget: €100,000.00

The Metamorphosis of Birds (Portuguese: A Metamorfose dos Pássaros) is a 2020 Portuguese experimental docudrama film directed by Catarina Vasconcelos and produced by the production company Primeira Idade, world premiered at the 70th Berlin International Film Festival in February 2020, where it was awarded the FIPRESCI Award for Best Film at the Encounters Section. It was selected as the Portuguese entry for the Best International Feature Film at the 94th Academy Awards.

The film was financed by the Portuguese film fund Instituto do Cinema e do Audiovisual and by Portugal's state broadcaster RTP and developed at the Archidoc writing program of the French film school La Fémis and the Arché development workshop promoted at the Doclisboa international documentary film festival.

== Awards ==
- FIPRESCI Award for Best Film at the Encounters Section of the 70th Berlinale;
- Best International Film of the 24th Vilnius International Film Festival;
- Jury Award for Best Film of the 23rd Taipei Film Festival;
- Award for Best International Film of the 19th Dokufest;
- Lino Miccichè Award for Best Film of the International Competition at the 56th Pesaro Film Festival in Italy;
- School Jury Award for Best Film of the 56th Pesaro Film Festival in Italy;
- Grand Prix and Audience Award of the 2020 New Horizons Film Festival

== See also ==
- List of submissions to the 94th Academy Awards for Best International Feature Film
- List of Portuguese submissions for the Academy Award for Best International Feature Film
