= André Marques (filmmaker) =

Portuguese film director and screenwriter

- Born: 1984 (age 41–42); Setúbal, Portugal
- Occupations: Film director, screenwriter, musician

André Marques (b. Setúbal, 1984) is a Portuguese film director, screenwriter and a musician. He currently lives in Portugal, having previously lived and worked in London and Bucharest.

== Early life ==
Marques was born in Setúbal in 1984. Marques is a graduate from Escola Superior de Teatro e Cinema, class of 2006, where he studied Screenwriting and Film Production.

== Career ==
His first experimental short film Going Blind was selected for DVD-Project and has toured around the world in art galleries and festivals.

His first fiction film João e o Cão (John and the Dog) was made with a low budget and with the collaboration of a young crew, some still in University. It premiered at the Berlin International Film Festival in 2008, and subsequently won the "Cacho Pallero Award" and a "Special Mention" for Chandra Malatitch at the Huesca International Film Festival, in Spain, and "Best New Director Award" at the Entre Todos Human Rights Short Film Festival, in Brazil, among other awards.

In 2008, Marques finished two short films. His second experimental short film, Boris Ghost Dog, was originally shot in the summer of 2004 using a Hi8 camera and is a study of a summer day with his dog Boris.O Lago (The Lake) is Marques' second fiction short film. With a running time of just above 30 minutes, it is somewhat of a road movie about two teenager friends who are going from world music summer festival to a hidden lake in south Portugal. O Lago had its international premiere at CineFest - International Festival of Young Filmmakers, in October 2009 in Hungary, followed by several other festivals, including Fantasporto IFF.

Going Blind, João e o Cão and O Lago have their soundtrack composed by the Belgo-Peruvian experimental musician ^{~~jozefaleksanderpedro~~}. Boris Ghost Dog has music from Magudesi and Rafael Toral.

Schogetten is the conclusion of the unplanned "Kids" trilogy, after João e o Cão (John and the Dog) and O Lago (The Lake). It premiered at Anonimul International Film Festival, in Romania, and it went to screen in several other festivals.

Luminita, his fourth short fiction film, premiered in Portuguese theaters on 31 July 2014, after winning the AUDIENCE AWARD at the 21st Curtas Vila do Conde Film Festival, the SPECIAL JURY PRIZE & BEST SCRIPT AWARD at the 52nd International Film Festival Cinema de Gijón, in Spain, and the GRAND PRIX at the 20th Drama International Short Film Festival, in Greece, among others. Luminita was also the recipient for the SOPHIA AWARD for the Best Portuguese Short Film given by the Portuguese Cinema Academy.

In 2014 he made a music video for Gareth Dickson (Cara, in competition at MUVI Lisbon), O Avô (Grandpa) a one-minute short film that won PEOPLE'S CHOICE AWARD & CINEUROPA FILMINUTE AUDIENCE AWARD & JURY COMMENDATION PRIZE at the biggest festival of its kind, Filminute, and wrote the film project The Drunk that selected for the Biennale College Cinema 2015 of the 72nd Venice International Film Festival.

From 2015 to 2018, Marques has shot 3 more music videos (Lazy Faithful - Frosted Glass, Gareth Dickson - Snag with the Language, Vaiapraia e as Rainhas do Baile - Snifa Cola/Kate Winslet), two new short fictions (Yulya, Câmara Nova/New Camera) and one short experimental documentary (Brother).

In 2019, two new short films were premiered: Look No Further and A Friend, the first being a portuguese-french co-production between Primeira Idade and Offshore with support from ICA/CNC and Fundação GDA, and the latter a no-budget short film with non-actors. Marques also served as producer and writer for the shorts, plus composing the soundtrack for Look No Further.

In 2022, Marques served as Producer and did additional editing for The End Before Me, a short doc directed by first time director Inês Luís, which premiered at Indielisboa International Film Festival the same year. Marques also directed his fifth music video for Rabu Mazda's track Domingo.

In 2023, Marques premiered two new films.

Minimum Speed Not Respected is the third film of the André Marques' Phantom Presence trilogy, after You Suck Me Dry (2012) and Brother (2016). It premiered in November 2023 at the 29th Caminhos do Cinema Português, part of the Outros Olhares competition.

The Drunk (original title: O Bêbado), André Marques' first feature length film, premiered in October 2023 at the 52nd Kyiv International Film Festival "Molodist". Marques wrote the first draft of The Drunk in 2012 and the script was later developed with the assistance of Venice's Biennale College Cinema in 2014, and the Plot Script Lab (Portugal) in 2015. In 2019, the project won ICA's (Portuguese Cinema Institute) First Feature fund. The production ultimately had a budget of 300K euros. The pandemic pushed the shooting forward to 2021 and the film was finally finished in 2023. The Drunk features first time actors Vítor Roriz and Ina Esanu in the main roles, supported by a cast of experienced actors and non-actors. The crew was quite a young one, the average age was about 25 years old. The music soundtrack is quite an eclectic one, with a mixture of new avant-garde American composers such as The Winged Victory for the Sullen and Elm (Jon Porras), British ambient folk musician Gareth Dickson and some vintage Portuguese artists.

The Drunk has won the FIPRESCI Prize at the 29th Caminhos do Cinema Português, the Best International Feature Film Award (Prémio Mejor Largometraje Internacional) at the 4th FICTLAX – Festival Internacional de Cine Tlaxcala, the Best Feature Film Award at the 4th Serbest International Film Festival, the Best Acting Award for Vítor Roriz at the 29th Ourense Film Festival, the Best Actor Award at the Autores Awards 2025 (SPA - Sociedade Portuguesa de Autores), three Awards at CinEuphoria (Best Film, Best Director, Best Actor for Vítor Roriz) and its nominated for Best Supporting Actor at Prémios Sophia (for João Pedro Vaz). The film was released in the Portuguese cinemas on 30 May 2024.

Marques has also worked in advertising and has done directing work for Nike, EMI, Burberry, Abbey Road Studios, Steidl Mack and Hit+Run, among others.

== Filmography ==
- 2006 - Going Blind (short exp)
- 2007 - João e o Cão (short fiction)
- 2008 - O Lago (short fiction)
- 2008 - Boris Ghost Dog (short exp)
- 2010 - Schogetten (short fiction)
- 2012 - You Suck Me Dry (short exp)
- 2013 - Luminita (short fiction)
- 2014 - O Avô (one minute short fiction)
- 2014 - Gareth Dickson - Cara (music video)
- 2015 - Yulya (short fiction)
- 2015 - Lazy Faithful - Frosted Glass (music video)
- 2016 - Brother (short exp/doc)
- 2016 - Gareth Dickson - Snag with the Language (music video)
- 2017 - Câmara Nova (short fiction)
- 2017 - Vaiapraia e as Rainhas do Baile - Snifa Cola/Kate Winslet (music video)
- 2019 - O Amigo (short fiction)
- 2019 - Look No Further (short fiction)
- 2022 - Rabu Mazda - Domingo (music video)
- 2023 - Minimum Speed Not Respected (short exp)
- 2023 - O Bêbado (The Drunk) (feature film)

== Discography ==
- 2009 - Songs for Tomorrow
