= Catarina Vasconcelos =

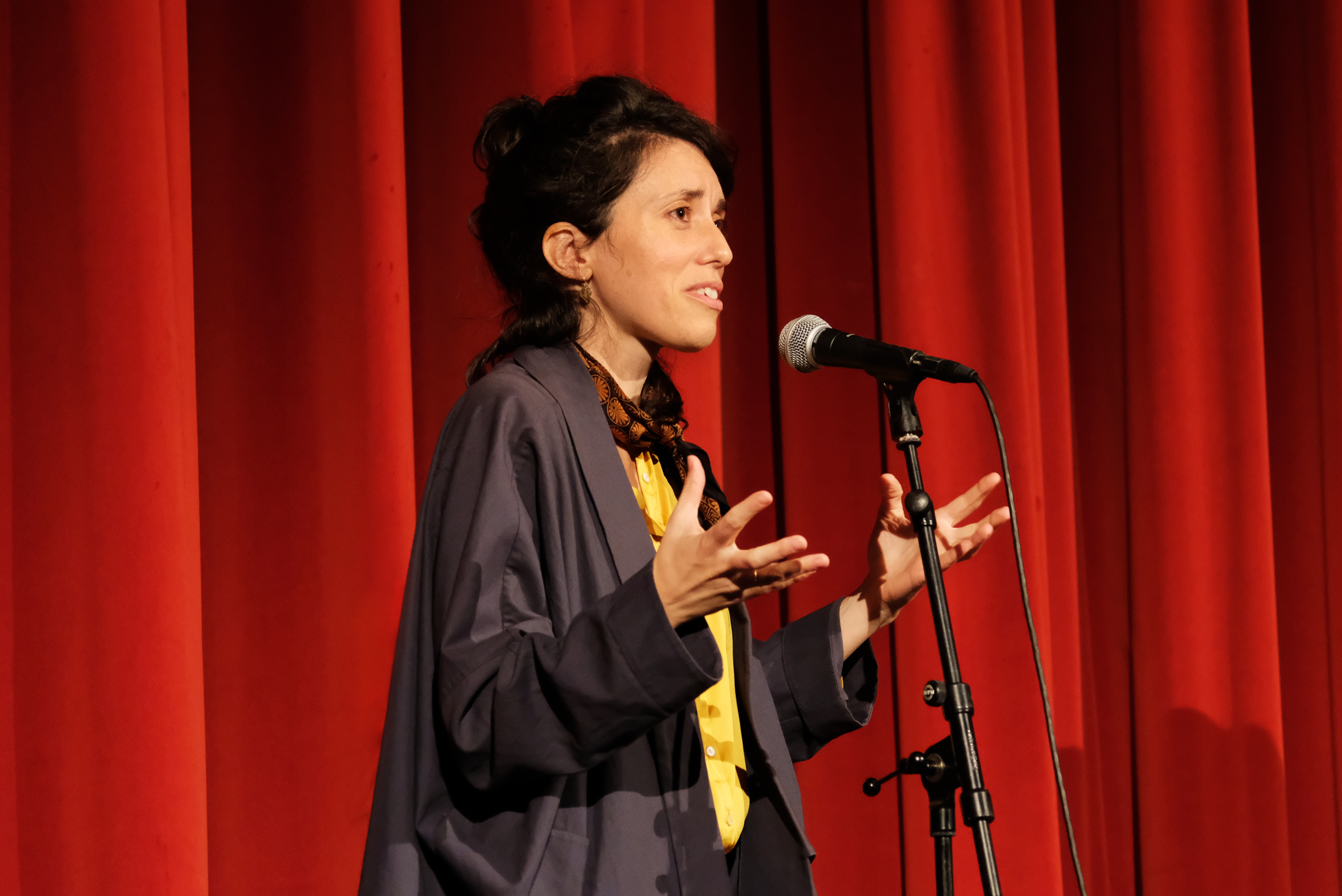
- Born: 1986 (age 39–40); Lisbon, Portugal
- Occupation: Filmmaker

Catarina Vasconcelos (born 1986) is a Portuguese filmmaker and producer. She is best known for her critically acclaimed 2020 film The Metamorphosis of Birds.

== Biography ==
Vasconcelos was born in Lisbon in 1986. Her mother died when she was 17.

She studied at the Faculty of Fine Arts in Lisbon, where she obtained her BA. She then moved to London where she pursued postgraduate studies, eventually graduating with a master's degree in Visual Communication at the Royal College of Art. As her graduation project, she made her first short film, Metáfora ou a tristeza virada do avesso. The film was awarded Best International Short Film at the Paris Film Festival Cinema du Réel and was screened at multiple international film festivals.

Vasconcelo's debut feature film, The Metamorphosis of Birds, won a number of prizes and was screened internationally, notably at the Berlin International Film Festival.

== Filmography ==
- 2011: Eu Sou da Mouraria - ou sete maneiras de contar e guardar histórias (as co-director)
- 2014: Metáfora ou a Tristeza Virada do Avesso (short film)
- 2020: The Metamorphosis of Birds
