= Noaz Deshe =

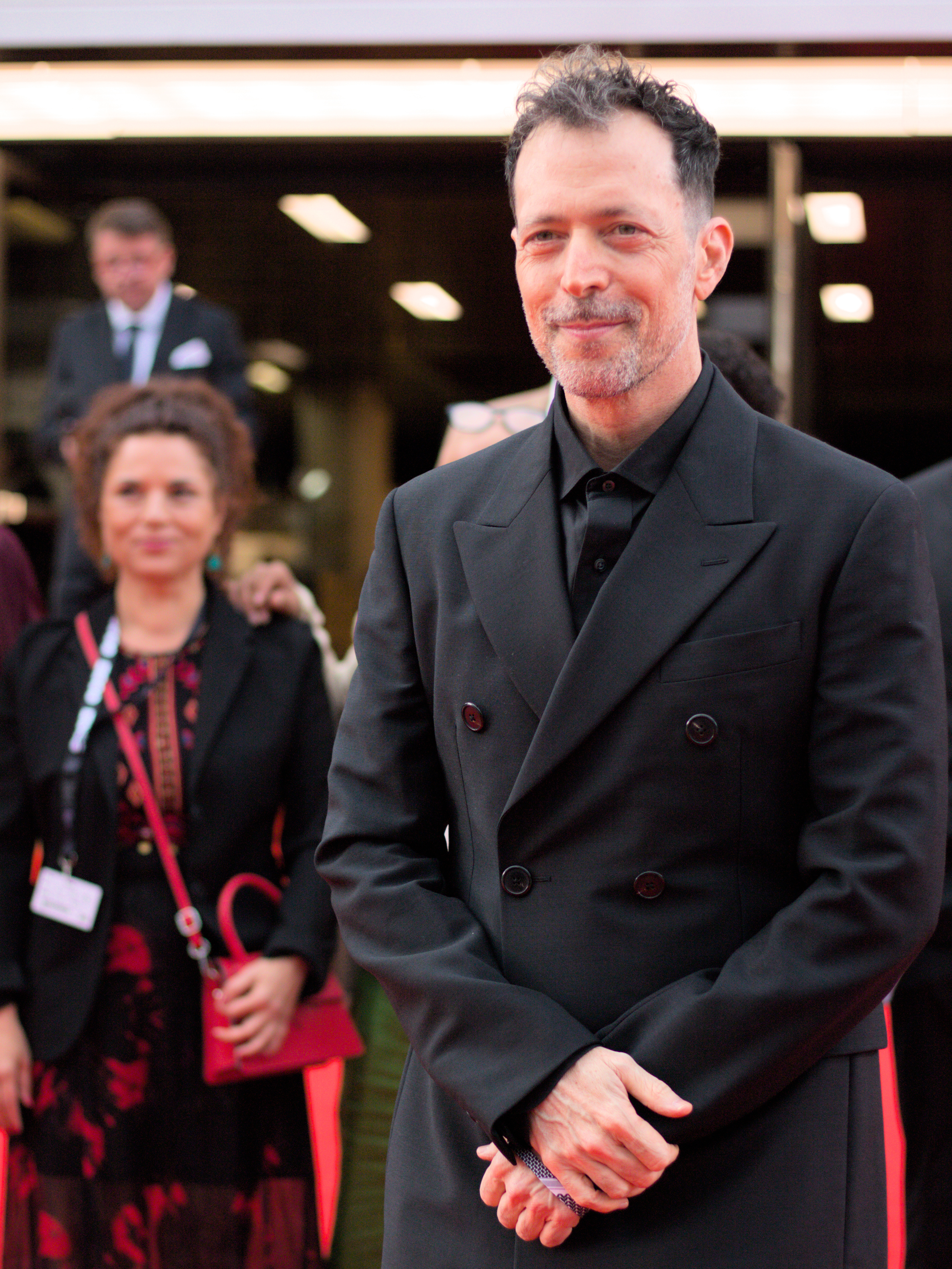
- Noaz Deshe in delegation to the film Xoftex at the red carpet at the 58th Karlovy Vary International Film Festival
- Citizenship: Romania
- Occupation: Film director

Noaz Deshe is a Berlin-based film director, cinematographer, composer and visual artist. His debut feature, White Shadow (2013), won the Lion of the Future award at the 2013 Venice Film Festival. His second feature, Xoftex (2024), is set in a Greek refugee camp and premiered in competition at the Karlovy Vary International Film Festival.

== Career ==
Deshe composed the soundtrack for Babak Jalali’s debut feature film Frontier Blues.

Deshe's feature debut White Shadow (2013) tells a story of albino persecution in Central Africa. The film brought Deshe the Lion of the Future Award at the Venice Film Festival 2013.

His sophomore feature, Xoftex, premiered at Karlovy Vary Film Festival in 2024. Deshe confesses that the film grew from his experience in Softex, a Greek refugee camp mostly filled by Syrian and Palestinian asylum seekers fleeing war in the Middle East.

Deshe's upcoming project is a collaboration with Pussy Riot's Pyotr Verzilov.

== Filmography ==
Year	Title	Role	Notes
2001	Boysgirls	Director	Short film
2001	Search Agent Zerox	Director	Short film
2009	Frontier Blues	Composer	Directed by Babak Jalali
2013	Area K: A Political Fishing Documentary	Cinematographer	Documentary
2013	White Shadow	Director, writer, cinematographer, editor, composer	Lion of the Future, Venice 2013
2016	Radio Dreams	Cinematographer	Directed by Babak Jalali
2024	Xoftex	Director, co-writer, cinematographer, co-editor, co-composer	Special Jury Mention, Karlovy Vary 2024
