= Independent Days Festival =

Italian music festival

Independent Days Festival was an Italian music festival that took place every September in Bologna. In June 2001, the festival was held in Monza. Currently, the I-Days festival is held annually in Milan.

== About ==
=== History ===
Statistics:

- 20,000 revellers in 1999
- 40,000 revellers in 2000
- 40,000 revellers in 2001

=== The Stages ===
Arena Parco Nord is the location of the main stage – a grass field with a curved banking giving an amphitheatre shape.

TENDA ESTRAGON is the tent which houses the second stage. The festival takes place as part of Festa de l'Unità – a popular outdoor festival full of restaurants, beer tents, and entertainment. Although the two stages are not connected, you are allowed to move between the two, enabling festival goers to enjoy all the attractions of the Festa de l'Unità. Traditionally the festival has had a punk theme, but in recent years, more mainstream acts have played, such as Franz Ferdinand, Editors, Maxïmo Park, and The Bravery.

== The billing ==
=== 1999 ===
The Offspring, Joe Strummer & The Mescaleros, Silverchair, Sick of It All, Hepcat, Lit, Punkreas, Verdena, Tre Allegri Ragazzi Morti

=== 2000 ===
Tenda Festival

- Saturday 2: Mr. Bungle, Boss Hog, Andre Williams, Slim, Titan

Arena Parco Nord

- Sunday 3: Blink 182, Limp Bizkit, Deftones, Millencolin, Verdena, Punkreas, No Use for a Name, Muse

=== 2001 ===
Man or Astro-man?, Mogwai, Eels, Turin Brakes, Ed Harcourt, I Am Kloot, The (International) Noise Conspiracy, Micevice, Boy Hits Cart, Cut, Scarlet, The Valentines, Manu Chao, Muse, Africa Unite, Ska-P, Modena City Ramblers, Rocket From The Crypt, Mad Caddies, Reel Big Fish, Banda Bassotti, Meganoidi, Persiana Jones, Tre Allegri Ragazzi Morti, Backyard Babies

=== 2002 ===
Subsonica, NOFX, The Jon Spencer Blues Explosion, Modena City Ramblers, Sick of It All, No Use for a Name, Punkreas, Meganoidi, The Music, Something Corporate, Pulley, Bouncing Souls, Ikara Colt, D4

=== 2003 ===
Rancid, The Cramps, The Mars Volta, Radio Birdman, Nashville Pussy, Lagwagon, A.F.I, Alkaline Trio, The Ataris, Mad Caddies, Fratelli Di Soledad, Thrice, Los Fastidios, Immortal Lee County Killers, Bigoz Quartet, All American Rejects, Punx Crew, The Peawees, Forty Winks Motorama, Thee S.T.P., Kim's Teddy Bears, Moravagine, Le Braghe Corte, Karnea.

=== 2004 ===
Sonic Youth, Franz Ferdinand, The Libertines, Mark Lanegan, Mondo Generator, Tre Allegri Ragazzi Morti, Colour Of Fire, Blueskins, Julie's Haircut, Raydaytona, The Darkness, Velvet Revolver, MC 5, Lars Frederiksen, Auf Der Maur, The Dirtbombs, New Found Glory, Thee S.T.P., Persiana Jones, Derozer, Radio 4, Everlast, Feist, Madbones, Friday Star, Morticia Lovers, Flogging Molly, Yellowcard, Vanilla Sky, Coheed and Cambria, Young Heart Attack, Ghetto Ways, Forty Winks, The No One, Wet Tones

=== 2005 ===
Bad Religion, Queens of the Stone Age, The Blood Brothers, The Bravery, Editors, The Futureheads, Maxïmo Park, Meganoidi, Skin, Social Distortion, Forty Winks, Marsh Mallows, The Peawees, Sikitikis

=== 2006 ===
One year hiatus

=== 2007 ===
Nine Inch Nails, Tool, Maxïmo Park, Hot Hot Heat, ...And You Will Know Us by the Trail of Dead, Billy Talent, Petrol

=== 2008 ===
It did not take place

=== 2009 ===
Deep Purple, The Kooks, Kasabian, Twisted Wheel, Expatriate, The Hacienda

=== 2010 ===
The Leeches, All Time Low, Simple Plan, Sum 41, Blink-182

=== 2011 ===
Arctic Monkeys, Kasabian, The Wombats, The Offspring, No Use for a Name, Face to Face

=== 2012 ===
Angels & Airwaves, Social Distortion, All Time Low
