= Mao (Italian singer) =

Italian radio and television presenter

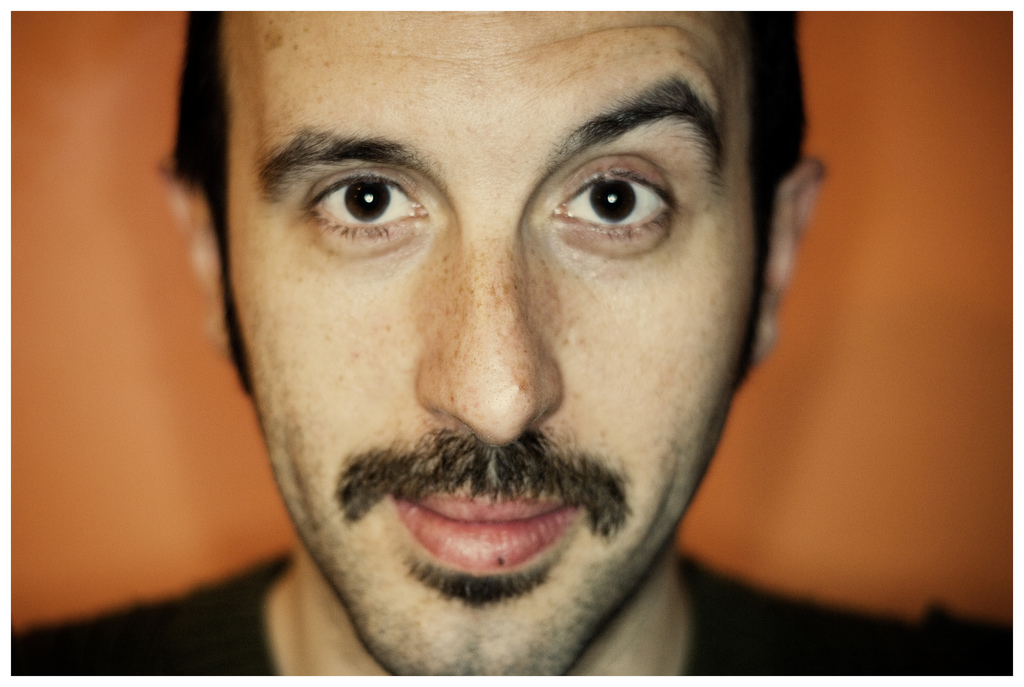

Background information
- Born: Mauro Gurlino; 16 April 1971 (age 55); Turin, Italy
- Genres: alternative rock; pop rock
- Occupations: singer-songwriter; composer; multi-instrumentalist; radio and television host; actor
- Instruments: vocals; guitar; bass; piano; keyboard; programming
- Years active: 1987–present
- Labels: Dracma Records; Virgin Records; Sony Music; Mescal; Incipit Records; CortoCorto
- Member of: Mao; Trio Marciano
- Formerly of: Mao e gli indiani; Voodoo; Magnifica Scarlatti; Mao e la Rivoluzione; Bit Reduce; U-Matic; Le Voci del Tempo
- Website: mao.it

Mauro Gurlino (born 16 April 1971), known as Mao, is an Italian singer-songwriter, composer, multi-instrumentalist, radio and television host and actor.

An artist mainly known for his work as a singer-songwriter and radio and television presenter, active since the late 1980s, he achieved national fame in the 1990s as the leader of the music group Mao e la Rivoluzione and for his co-hosting with Andrea Pezzi of the TV programme Kitchen broadcast on MTV Italy.

== Biography ==
He has earned a degree in History and Criticism of Cinema at the Faculty of Arts and Philosophy of the University of Turin. A creative and in-depth critique discussing the musical film Yuppi du by Adriano Celentano was among his final thesis topics. «He is and has been anything», as once he was defined by a journalist describing his eclectic thirty-year career.

He has been leader in the Nineties of the band Mao e la Rivoluzione, publishing two albums for Virgin Records (Sale and Casa, attending Sanremo Festival with the song Romantico and performing the opening act for Oasis), presenter with Andrea Pezzi for TV shows broadcast on MTV Italy (Kitchen, Hot, Romalive, Tiziana, Tokusho), speaker for radio stations since the high school (Rai Radio 1, Radio Deejay, Radio Città Futura, Radio Flash), actor both in long films (20 Venti by Marco Pozzi, 500! by Giovanni Robbiano, Lorenzo Vignolo and Matteo Zingirian, Lost Love (Perdutoamor) by Franco Battiato, Roundtrip (A/R Andata + Ritorno) and A Liberal Passion (Passione sinistra) by Marco Ponti, I soliti idioti: Il film by Enrico Lando) and in short films (directed by Enrico Iacovoni, Nicola Rondolino, Igor Mendolia and Guido Norzi).

Over the years, he has collaborated with several musicians, among which, Delta V, Max Gazzè and Morgan, producer of his first solo record Black mokette, released by Sony Music, followed by the soundtrack for the film 500!, released by Mescal. Together with Santabarba, he played as resident band for the music TV show Scalo 76 broadcast on Rai 2. Rai, the Italian national television, had him as well as resident musician for the radio show Ventura Football Club broadcast on Rai Radio 1.

For over twenty years, together with his artistic collective CortoCorto, he has been organising showcases for the Turin nightclubbing scene through the soundtrack contests Duel, the song contests LaBase and the talk shows Il Salotto di Mao, formats which have hosted more than 1,000 artists. He was member for ten years of the trio Le Voci del Tempo, a band telling the Italian history in clubs and theatres with shows mixing images, readings and songs.

In 2010 he published his third solo record, Piume pazze, distributed for free on internet, followed by two novels Meglio tardi che Mao (Express Edizioni) in 2011 and Olràit! Mao sogna Celentano e gliele canta (Arcana Edizioni) in 2013. He is owner and manager of CortoCorto STUDIO, an audio-video recording and production studio located in the heart of San Salvario neighborhood in Turin.

Between 2019 and 2020 he returned on the record market with the singles Nudi alla meta, Le cose and the music video of Scusa caro vicino, born from the artistic collaboration with the writer Enrica Tesio and produced by DJ Aladyn and Max Bellarosa from Radio Deejay. Also in 2020, in a duet with Il Tusco, he released the music video for Velenosa. In 2022, exactly twenty-five years after the release of the seminal album Casa, he surprisingly published the music video for Stringimi #25, recorded as a duet with Bianco and filmed at the Murazzi del Po in front of the historic Giancarlo club.

In 2025 he joins Delta V as the opening act for their tour presenting the new album In fatti ostili, performing in some of the most renowned music clubs across Italy. During the tour, he presents audiences with an exclusive preview of several unreleased songs from his forthcoming and highly awaited new album, scheduled for release in 2026.

== Discography ==
=== Mao e gli indiani ===
Singles (7")

- 1989 - Dolore fisico / Piccolo fratello

=== Magnifica Scarlatti ===
Demos (MC)

- 1991 - Demo

Compilations (LP)

- 1991 - VV.AA. - Arezzo Wave 1991 (Magnifica Scarlatti - Apro il tempo)
- 1992 - VV.AA. - Bloom live vol. 1 (Magnifica Scarlatti - It ain't the end)

Compilations (MC)

- 1991 - VV.AA. - Arezzo Wave 1991 (Magnifica Scarlatti - Apro il tempo)

=== Voodoo ===
Albums (LP)

- 1992 - Il voltafaccia

Compilations (LP)

- 1990 - VV.AA. - Nightpieces (Voodoo - Rock the beat)
- 1990 - VV.AA. - Anteprima Rock - Rock Italia (Voodoo - Lysergic brain)

Compilations (LP Promo)

- 1990 - VV.AA. - Anteprima Rock - Rock Italia (Voodoo - Lysergic brain)

Compilations (MC)

- 1991 - VV.AA. - Torino Bagdad (Voodoo - Chiudi gli occhi, Everyday)

=== Mao e la Rivoluzione ===
Albums (CD - MC)

- 1996 - Sale
- 1997 - Casa

Singles (12")

- 1996 - Febbre

Singles (CD)

- 1997 - Stringimi
- 1998 - Chinese take away

Singles (Promo 7")

- 1997 - Spice Girls / Mao - Spice Up Your Life / Romantico

Singles (Promo CD)

- 1996 - Febbre
- 1996 - Il ritmo
- 1997 - Stringimi
- 1997 - Romantico
- 1998 - Satelliti

Compilations (CD)

- 1993 - VV.AA. - Hokahey! Songs for Freedom Coalition (Mao e la Rivoluzione - Visi pallidi)
- 1994 - VV.AA. - Bienal Lisboa 1994 (Mao e la Rivoluzione - Umida)
- 1996 - VV.AA. - Territorio Match Music (Mao e la Rivoluzione - Febbre)
- 1996 - VV.AA. - Musica che cambia - Max Generation 96 (Mao e la Rivoluzione - Al limite)
- 1997 - VV.AA. - MTV 24 Hours Party (Mao - Stringimi)
- 1997 - VV.AA. - Hit's Virgin Pop (Mao - Romantico)
- 1997 - VV.AA. - Radio Capital Compilation (Mao - Romantico)
- 1998 - VV.AA. - Hit's Rock Now (Mao - Satelliti)
- 1998 - VV.AA. - MescalAction (Mao - Chinese take away)
- 1999 - VV.AA. - Adidas Streetball Challenge (Mao - Stringimi)
- 2003 - VV.AA. - Mescal.it 2003 (Mao - Satelliti)

Compilations (MC)

- 1996 - VV.AA. - Territorio Match Music (Mao e la Rivoluzione - Febbre)
- 1997 - VV.AA. - MTV 24 Hours Party (Mao - Stringimi)
- 1997 - VV.AA. - Hit's Virgin Pop (Mao - Romantico)
- 1997 - VV.AA. - Radio Capital Compilation (Mao - Romantico)
- 1998 - VV.AA. - Hit's Rock Now (Mao - Satelliti)

=== Mao ===
Albums (CD)

- 2001 - Black mokette
- 2002 - 500! (Original Soundtrack)
- 2010 - Piume pazze
- 2011 - Meglio tardi che Mao

Singles (CD)

- 2001 - Prima di addormentarmi
- 2001 - Un mondo diverso

Singles (Promo CD)

- 2004 - Electro samba

Singles (Digital)

- 2019 - Nudi alla meta
- 2019 - Le cose
- 2020 - Scusa caro vicino
- 2020 - Velenosa

Compilations (CD)

- 2001 - VV.AA. - Tora! Tora! Compilation (Mao - Prima di addormentarmi)
- 2001 - VV.AA. - Tora! Tora! 2001 (Mao - L'effetto che fa (una sconfitta in due))
- 2002 - VV.AA. - Tora! Tora! 2002 (Mao - Io viaggio)
- 2025 - VV.AA. - Vittorio Cane - Venti anni dopo (Mao - Dipendente)

Compilations (Promo CD)

- 2002 - VV.AA. - Cool Sound Italiano (Mao - Prima di addormentarmi)

Compilations (Digital)

- 2005 - VV.AA. - to_potlach (Mao - Gridalo forte!)
- 2012 - VV.AA. - Turin Songwriters Festival (Mao - Dikono ke)
- 2023 - VV.AA. - Tunes That Stick Vol 9 (Mao - E-motion)

Bootlegs

- 2009 - Il Salotto di Mao - Vol. 1
- 2012 - Il Salotto di Mao - Vol. 2
- 2013 - Il Salotto di Mao - Vol. 3

Collaborations

Albums (CD-MC)

- 1991 - Fratelli di Soledad - Salviamo il salvabile (backing vocals in Gioia e rivoluzione, Fiume sand creek, (Per quello che ho da fare) Faccio il militare, Nel ghetto, Gianna)
- 1991 - Gianni Cirigliano - No stop! (demo) (author, vocals)
- 1992 - Francesca Olivieri & Deep River Choir - Francesca Olivieri & Deep River Choir (bass chorister)
- 1994 - Fratelli di Soledad - Gridalo forte (backing vocals)
- 1995 - Africa Unite - Un sole che brucia (backing vocals in Rubaduba, Uniformi, Terra tua, Immobile)
- 1998 - Max Gazzè - La favola di Adamo ed Eva (co-composer, vocals, acoustic guitar in Colloquium vitæ)
- 1999 - Delta V - Psychobeat (author, vocals in La mia cosa)

Albums (CD)

- 2004 - Zerouno - Zerouno (vocals in Non ti conosco)
- 2007 - Vittorio Cane - Secondo (vocals in Ci proverò)
- 2008 - Stiv - Blu senape (vocals in Proiettile lento)
- 2009 - Hellzapop - Finché la luce è accesa (vocals in La notte delle stelle di plastica)
- 2011 - Max Gazzè - La favola di Adamo ed Eva - Max Gazzè (co-composer, vocals, acoustic guitar in Colloquium vitæ)
- 2011 - Soluzione - L'esperienza segna (vocals in Anni 70)
- 2011 - Persiana Jones - Essenze (vocals in Odio il lunedì)
- 2011 - Tilt - L'evoluzione delle ombre (co-author in Come se, Paura mai)
- 2012 - Davide Tosches - Il lento disgelo (vocals in Scintille)
- 2013 - Dj Fede - Tutti dentro… di nuovo (vocals in A chance for peace)
- 2014 - Fratelli di Soledad - Salviamo il salvabile (atto II) (backing vocals in Je vous salue Ninì)
- 2015 - Dj Fede - Funk & Dub (vocals in A chance for peace (Jolly Mare & B.Kun Dub Remix), Holdin' on (Dj Fede Fresh Dub), Lucky fellow (Pisti Remix), Lady Day & John Coltrane (Lady Dub by Alambic Conspiracy Dub Version), Con il nastro rosa (Pink Stripe Dub Remix by Alambic Conspiracy)
- 2017 - Dj Fede - Rude Boy Rocker (vocals in Holdin' On, Lucky fellow, A chance for peace, Lady Day & John Coltrane)
- 2018 - Powerillusi - Powerillusi & Friends (vocals, acoustic guitar, backing vocals in Quella del papà)
- 2018 - Max Gazzè - La favola di Adamo ed Eva - 1998-2018 Anniversary Edition (co-composer, vocals, acoustic guitar in Colloquium vitæ)
- 2019 - LATLETA - Miraggi (acoustic guitar in Io ti conosco)
- 2021 - Simona Palumbo - Latin land (co-author, composer, vocals in Un’onda)
- 2025 - Simona Palumbo - Latin vibes (co-author, composer, vocals in Un’onda (Remix))
- 2025 - Tosello - Nel disordine delle cose (electric guitar in Volti stanchi)

Albums (Digital)

- 2007 - T.O.E.! - Vivisezione di un alluce (vocals in Carlo sei nei guai (Mao mix)).
- 2014 - Davi Campa - Metamorfosi (vocals, acoustic guitar in A volte cadiamo)
- 2015 - Il Tusco - Il Tusco canta e Mao gliele suona! (vocals in Demagogia fiscale)
- 2021 - Simona Palumbo - Latin land (co-author, composer, vocals in Un’onda)
- 2023 - Stiv Tirella - Tale e quale (co-author, vocals in Una notte e un giorno in più, Fuori)
- 2025 - Simona Palumbo - Latin vibes (co-author, composer, vocals in Un’onda (Remix))
- 2026 - Delta V - In fatti ostili RMX (acoustic guitars, electric bass, remixer in Wendy (Mao Remix))

Albums (LP)

- 2014 - Dj Fede - Rude Boy Funker (vocals in Holdin' on, Lucky fellow, A chance for peace, Lady Day & John Coltrane, Lady Day & John Coltrane (Lady Dub - Alambic Conspiracy Dub Version))
- 2018 - Max Gazzè - La favola di Adamo ed Eva - 1998-2018 Anniversary Edition (co-composer, vocals, acoustic guitar in Colloquium vitæ)
- 2019 - LATLETA - Miraggi (acoustic guitar in Io ti conosco)

Singles (10")

- 1994 - Fratelli di Soledad - Gridalo forte (backing vocals)

Singles (7")

- 2013 - Dj Fede - A change for peace / Torino violenta 2 (vocals in A change for peace)
- 2014 - Dj Fede - Lucky fellow / Ain't no Sunshine (vocals in Lucky fellow)

Singles (CD)

- 1999 - Max Gazzè - Colloquium vitæ (co-composer, vocals, acoustic guitar in Colloquium vitæ, Colloquium vitæ (album version))

Singles (Promo CD)

- 1999 - Max Gazzè - Colloquium vitæ (co-composer, vocals, acoustic guitar in Colloquium vitæ, Colloquium vitæ (album version))
- 2007 - Vittorio Cane - Ci proverò (vocals)

Singles (Digital)

- 2011 - Soluzione - Anni 70 (vocals in Anni 70)
- 2018 - Trio Marciano feat. Bandakadabra - Stoppi
- 2022 - Trio Marciano - Incipit
- 2022 - Trio Marciano - Terme di Stura
- 2023 - Trio Marciano - Vieni a vivere di noi
- 2023 - Simona Palumbo - Un'onda (Remix) (co-author, composer, vocals)

EPs (Digital)

- 2023 - Trio Marciano - Trilogy

Compilations (CD)

- 1999 - VV.AA. - Hit Summer Now (Max Gazzè feat. Mao - Colloquium vitæ)
- 2002 - VV.AA. - Deejay for Christmas (Deejay All Stars - Tutti pazzi per Mary Xmas (Trying to Make a Fool of Me))
- 2006 - VV.AA. - Piemontegroove Vol. 2 (Mao & The Nice Guys - Could be right)
- 2007 - Max Gazzè - The Best of Platinum (Max Gazzè feat. Mao - Colloquium vitæ)
- 2008 - VV.AA. - Deviazioni (Un omaggio a Vasco Rossi) (Persiana Jones feat. Mao - Lunedì)
- 2008 - Max Gazzè - The Virgin Collection: Una musica può fare (Max Gazzè feat. Mao - Colloquium vitæ)
- 2010 - VV.AA. - Boom Boom Fred (Mao & Santabarba - Eri piccola così)
- 2012 - VV.AA. - Natale a casa Deejay (Deejay All Stars - Tutti pazzi per Mary Xmas (Trying to Make a Fool of Me))
- 2013 - Max Gazzè - The Platinum Collection (Max Gazzè feat. Mao - Colloquium vitæ)
- 2014 - VV.AA. - Natale a casa Deejay (Deejay All Stars - Tutti pazzi per Mary Xmas (Trying to Make a Fool of Me))

Compilations (CD Promo)

- 2012 - VV.AA. - Turin Songwriters Festival (Mao - Dikono ke)

Compilations (MC)

- 2002 - VV.AA. - Deejay for Christmas (Deejay All Stars - Tutti pazzi per Mary Xmas (Trying to Make a Fool of Me))

Compilations (Digital)

- 2009 - VV.AA. - Torino Sistema Solare. San Salvario: da mezzanotte alle quattro (Vittorio Cane feat. Mao - Ci proverò)

Productions

Albums (CD)

- 2011 - Tilt - L'evoluzione delle ombre (artistic co-producer)
- 2021 - Simona Palumbo - Latin land (cartistic co-producer, co-arranger)

Albums (Digital)

- 2015 - ConiglioViola - Recuperate le vostre radici quadrate (mixing in Nell'aria, Alexander Platz)
- 2015 - Il Tusco - Il Tusco canta e Mao gliele suona! (artistic producer; arranging, recording, mixing, except Le Parole)
- 2021 - Simona Palumbo - Latin land (artistic co-producer, co-arranger)

EPs (Digital)

- 2024 - Il Tusco - TuscoLana

Singles (CD)

- 2002 - Cerchi nel grano - Ciao mondo (artistic co-producer, co-mixing)

Singles (Digital)

- 2020 - Follùcida - Le parole giuste (artistic producer; arrangement, recording, mixing)
- 2024 - Il Tusco - Notte artificiale

=== Bit Reduce ===
Compilations (CD)

- 2003 - VV.AA. - Piemonte Groove (Bit Reduce - Bad boy screaming)

=== U-Matic ===
Albums (CD)

- 2004 - Motel Connection & VV.AA. - Roundtrip (A/R Andata + Ritorno) (Original Soundtrack) (U-Matic - Da nessuna parte)

== Videography ==
=== Mao ===
- 1996 - Mao e la Rivoluzione - Febbre (Luca Pastore)
- 1997 - Mao - Romantico (Lorenzo Vignolo)
- 1997 - Mao - Satelliti (Lorenzo Vignolo)
- 1998 - Mao - Chinese take away (Lorenzo Vignolo)
- 2001 - Mao - Prima di addormentarmi (Fabio Jansen)
- 2001 - Mao - Un mondo diverso (Lorenzo Vignolo)
- 2002 - Mao - Io viaggio (Beniamino Catena)
- 2010 - Mao - La mia soddisfazione (Paolo Modugno)
- 2020 - Mao - Scusa caro vicino (Hiram Gellona)
- 2020 - Mao x Il Tusco - Velenosa (Hiram Gellona)
- 2022 - Mao feat. Bianco - Stringimi #25 (Mattia Martino)

=== Collaborations ===
- 1999 - Max Gazzè feat. Mao - Colloquium vitæ (Daniele Persica)
- 1999 - Delta V - Il primo giorno del mondo (Fabrizio Trigari)
- 2007 - Vittorio Cane feat. Mao - Ci proverò (Claudio Cosimato)
- 2007 - Nadàr Solo - Novenovembre (Luciano De Simone)
- 2008 - Vittorio Cane - Domenica (Luca Cosimato - Holland)
- 2009 - Santabarba - Nano capitano (Tommaso Caroni)
- 2010 - Fratelli di Soledad - Je vous salue Ninì (Gigi Roccati)
- 2013 - DJ Fede feat. Mao - A change for peace (Alessandro Pisani)
- 2018 - Trio Marciano feat. Bandakadabra - Stoppi
- 2020 - Powerillusi feat. Mao & Parpaglione - Quella del papà (Vince Ricotta)
- 2022 - Trio Marciano - Incipit (Mattia Martino)
- 2022 - Simona Palumbo feat. Mao - Un'onda (Hiram Gellona)
- 2023 - Trio Marciano - Vieni a vivere di noi (Mattia Martino)
- 2023 - Simona Palumbo feat. Mao - Un'onda (Remix) (Giorgio Lusso)
- 2024 - Trio Marciano - Terme di Stura (Vito Miccolis)
- 2026 - Delta V - Wendy (Mao Remix) (Nicolas Fransolet)

== Line-ups and side projects ==
- 1987-1990 - Voodoo (Roberto Bovolenta, Mauro Gurlino, Luca Mangani, Andrea Mazzon)
- 1989-1992 - Magnifica Scarlatti (Silvio Bernelli, Elvin Betti, Mauro Gurlino, Alesandro Picciuolo)
- 1992 - solo
- 1993-1998 - Mao e la Rivoluzione (Paolo Cucco, Mauro Gurlino, Gianluca Medina, Matteo Salvadori)
- 1999 - Le Kojak (Mauro Gurlino + guests)
- 2002 - Bit Reduce (Luca Gennaro, Mauro Gurlino)
- 2004 - U-Matic (Alessandro Di Maggio, Mauro Gurlino)
- 2007-2014 - Le Voci del Tempo (Mario Congiu, Mauro Gurlino, Marco Peroni)
- 2007-2011 - Mao & Santabarba (Claudio De Marco, Mauro Gurlino, Eugenio Odasso, Mattia Martino)
- 2011-2012 - Mao & Barber Mouse (Mattia Barbieri, Mauro Gurlino, Fabrizio Rat, Stefano Risso)
- 2011-2012 - Kitchen Trio (Mauro Gurlino, Vito Miccolis, Gianluca Senatore)
- 2018 - Trio Marciano (Mauro Gurlino, Vincenzo Mesiti, Vito Miccolis)

== Live equipment ==
- Epiphone Chet Atkins
- Fender Telecaster
- Gibson John Lennon J-160E Peace
- Gibson Acoustic Songwriter Deluxe Studio
- Martin DXM Acoustic Guitar

== Sanremo Music Festival ==
Year	Category	Song	Interpreter
1997	Newcomers	"Romantico"	Mao

== Filmography ==
Short films

- 1997 - Casa (Mauro “Mao” Gurlino and Paolo “Gep” Cucco)
- 2002 - La gara di salto con le uova (Enrico Iacovoni)
- 2003 - Garage madama (Nicola Rondolino)
- 2004 - L'inquilina dell'ultimo piano (single si nasce) (Igor Mendolia and Guido Norzi)
- 2010 - Il diario di “Piume pazze” (Alessandra Guidetti)
- 2012 - Non ho nulla da concordare - Deluxe (Simone Gigiaro, Damiano Monaco and Gabriele Monaco)

Long films

- 2000 - 20 Venti (Marco Pozzi)
- 2001 - 500! (Giovanni Robbiano, Lorenzo Vignolo and Matteo Zingirian)
- 2002 - Lost Love (Perdutoamor) (Franco Battiato)
- 2004 - Roundtrip (A/R Andata + Ritorno) (Marco Ponti)
- 2006 - I comizi di Mao (Mauro “Mao” Gurlino)
- 2011 - I soliti idioti: Il film (Enrico Lando)
- 2013 - A Liberal Passion (Passione sinistra) (Marco Ponti)
- 2014 - Ti amo troppo per dirtelo (Marco Ponti)
- 2014 - The Beautiful “Loser”. Una vita apparentemente normale. Gigi Restagno e la Torino musicale degli anni ottanta (Diego Amodio)
- 2016 - Rotte indipendenti: Torino (Giangiacomo De Stefano and Lara Rongoni)
- 2024 - I soliti idioti 3 - Il ritorno (Fabrizio Biggio, Francesco Mandelli, Ferruccio Martini)
- 2026 - Falene (Ivan Cazzola)

== Television ==
MTV Italy

- 1997-1998-1999-2001 - Kitchen
- 1999 - Super Kitchen
- 1997 - Hot
- 1999 - Tiziana
- 2000-2001 - Romalive

Match Music

- 1999 - Sanremo

Rai

- 2009 - Scalo 76
- 2021 - Che succ3de?

== Radio ==
Radio Flash

- 1988–1996
- 1994-1995 - L'agenda di Mao
- 2006-2007 - L'oro in bocca
- 2007-2008 - Flash International
- 2014-2014 - Meglio tardi che Mao (Diario di un Cantastorie)
- 2014-2019 - Roba forte
- 2016-2019 - Il Salotto di Mao

Radio Deejay

- 1998 - Per noi giovani
- 1997-1999 - Kitchen

Radio Torino Popolare

- 2003–2005

Gru Radio

- 2009-2014 - Magical Mystery Turin, Il Salotto di Mao, The Mao Mad Show, Il Diario di Mao, Aspettando Gru Village

Rai Radio 1

- 2010-2011 - Ventura Football Club

Radio Città Futura

- 2017-2018 - Il Salotto di Mao

Radio Reporter Torino

- 2019-2020 - Il Salotto di Mao

== Novels ==
- 2011 - Mauro “Mao” Gurlino, Meglio tardi che Mao, Espress Edizioni, Turin, Italy, pp. 102, ISBN 9788897412168
- 2013 - Mauro “Mao” Gurlino, Olràit! Mao sogna Celentano e gliele canta, Arcana Edizioni, Rome, Italy, pp. 187, ISBN 9788862312219

== Curiosities ==
- The song Dolore fisico, released in 1989 on a 7" as Mao e gli indiani, was used in the TV programme Mai dire Gol.
- On 29 March 1996, the band Mao e la Rivoluzione opened the concert of Oasis at the Palalido in Milan during the (What's the Story) Morning Glory? Tour.
- Issue 193 of the Italian music magazine Fare Musica, published in 1997, features Richard Ashcroft of the Verve and Mao side by side on the cover, accompanied by the headline “separated at birth!”.
- The song Chinese take away is featured in the film Abbiamo solo fatto l'amore (1998) by Fulvio Ottaviano.
- The music video of the song Chinese take away won the award for best overground videoclip at the 1998 Meeting of Independent Labels.
- In 1998 the band Mao e la Rivoluzione won the San Marino Festival's Titano Award in the best rock band category.
- In the original version of the music video of the song Un mondo diverso, the final scene saw Mao dancing and playing guitar with a wall of three huge photographs behind him: a field of flowers, a lake with Thai huts and the New York skyline with the Twin Towers. The videoclip was aired a few days before 11 September 2001, only to be immediately withdrawn. A week later, an alternative version began airing with the final scene specially reworked (in the original version, in fact, Mao was smiling and making the victory sign with his hand, with the World Trade Center in the background).
- Morgan, co-producer with Mao of album Black mokette, considers the record the best he has worked on in his career.
- During the presentation of Fabi Silvestri Gazzè's album Il padrone della festa in Turin, Daniele Silvestri stated that he had memories linked to the city of Turin accompanied by Mao's songs, so much so that he was inspired by the song Febbre for his Cohiba.
- The song Satelliti was included by Indie for Bunnies in the top 10 Italian indie-rock songs released by outsiders in the 1990s.

== See also ==
- Andrea Pezzi
- Bluvertigo
- Delta V
- Enrico Lando
- Federico Zampaglione
- Franco Battiato
- Marco Ponti
- Max Gazzè
- Morgan
- Persiana Jones

== Bibliography ==
- 1991 - VV.AA., Musica a Torino 1991. Rock, pop, jazz, folk, EDT, Turin, Italy, pp. 156, ISBN 978-8870631272. (cit.)
- 1999 - Andrea Pezzi, Kitchen: non c'era la neve, Bompiani, Milan, Italy, pp. 167, ISBN 978-8845242090 (afterword by Mao)
- 2003 - Guido Michelone, Imagine. Il rock-film tra nuovo cinema e musica giovanile, Effatà Editrice, Cantalupa, Italy, pp. 368, ISBN 978-8874020485 (preface by Mao)
- 2006 - Gianluca Testani (ed.), Enciclopedia Rock Italiano, Arcana Edizioni, Rome, Italy, pp. 440, ISBN 978-8879664226 (cit.)
- 2014 - Marco Ponti, Cristiano Spadavecchia, Un appartamento a Torino. Altrimenti ci arrendiamo!, Pavesio Editore, Turin, Italy, pp. 118, ISBN 978-8862330596 (cit.)
- 2011 - Dada Rosso, Tipi torinesi, Edizioni Il Leone Verde, Turin, Italy, pp. 114, ISBN 978-8865800386 (cit.)
- 2020 - Francesco Andrea Brunale, Dischi da ‘90, Bertoni Editore, Perugia, Italy, pp. 307, ISBN 978-8855352253 (cit.)
