= Al Posto Del Fuoco =

Studio album by Meganoidi
- Released: 2009
- Genres: Progressive rock, Alternative rock
- Length: 38:22
- Label: Green Fog Records

Meganoidi chronology
Granvanoeli (2006)	Al Posto Del Fuoco (2009)	Welcome in Disagio (2012)

Al Posto Del Fuoco is the fourth album of the Italian alternative rock band Meganoidi.

== Track listing ==
1. Altrove - 3:01
2. Aneta - 3:09
3. Dighe - 3:28
4. Dune - 4:49
5. Scusami Las Vegas - 3:32
6. Ima-Go-Go - 3:13
7. Mia - 2:57
8. Solo Alla Fine - 3:14
9. Your Desire - 3:15
10. Stormo - 4:34
11. Al Posto Del Fuoco - 3:01
