= Love Is Lost (disambiguation) =

"Love Is Lost" is a 2013 David Bowie song.

Love Is Lost may also refer to:

- "Love Is Lost", by L'Âme Immortelle from the albums ...In einer Zukunft aus Tränen und Stahl
- "Love Is Lost", by Wise Dome featuring Supastition

== See also ==
- Love Lost (disambiguation)
