= Owo (disambiguation) =

Owo is a local government area in Ondo State, Nigeria.

Owo may also refer to:

- Owo, Enugu, a town in Enugu State, Nigeria
- OwO, an open-eye version of the UwU emoticon
- -owo, a common city name suffix in Poland

== See also ==
- Owo soup, in Nigerian cuisine
- Owo Museum, a museum in Owo, Ondo, Nigeria
- Ouo, a town in Burkina Faso
- OVO (disambiguation)
