= Wendy (Delta-V song) =

"Wendy (Remix)"

Song by Delta V & Mao

from the album In fatti ostili RMX
- Released: 31 July 2026
- Recorded: May–June 2026
- Studio: CortoCorto Studio (Turin, Italy)
- Length: 5:28
- Label: Universal Music Italia
- Songwriters: Carlo Bertotti, Roberto Vernetti
- Producer: Mao

Music video
- "Wendy" (Mao Remix) on YouTube

"Wendy" (Remix) is a remix produced by Italian singer-songwriter Mao of the song "Wendy" by the Italian band Delta V, included on the remix album In fatti ostili RMX, released by Universal Music Italia on 31 July 2026.

== Background ==
The collaboration between Delta V and Mao is part of an ongoing artistic relationship developed over several years and reinforced through recurring live and studio interactions. During the tour supporting In fatti ostili, Mao served as opening act for the band, contributing to a renewed creative exchange that traces back to the 1990s Italian alternative music scene.

Their artistic connection dates back to earlier collaborations, including Mao's contribution as lyricist and performer on "La mia cosa", featured on Delta V's album Psychobeat, as well as his appearance in the music video for "Il primo giorno del mondo", alongside Angela Baraldi and Garbo.

== Composition and production ==
In this version, Mao reinterprets "Wendy" by reshaping its original structure into a more electronic and cinematic arrangement, characterised by an atmospheric and nocturnal sound. The remix preserves the core songwriting of Delta V while recontextualising it within a more abstract sonic framework aligned with Mao's artistic approach. The reworking started from the piano riff of the original track, which Mao identified as the most distinctive element around which to build the remix.

For the remix, Mao worked from the original multitrack stems provided by Delta V, selecting and highlighting elements of the original production and adding further guitar and bass parts recorded by himself, in an approach explicitly inspired by the aesthetics of late-1990s electronic remixes. The track opens with an instrumental introduction lasting roughly one minute fifty seconds before the vocals enter.

== Project and release ==
"Wendy (Remix)" is part of In fatti ostili RMX, a collection of reinterpretations of the tracks from Delta V's album In fatti ostili, created by various artists and producers of the Italian alternative music scene. The album gathers remixes largely released in the preceding months: the remix of "Wendy", produced by Mao, is its only previously unreleased track and was issued simultaneously with the album on 31 July 2026. The music video was published on YouTube on the same day.

== Music video ==
The music video, directed by Nicolas Fransolet, a filmmaker originally from Brussels and based in Montreal, was filmed in Tokyo. It develops an urban and cinematic visual imagery, consistent with the aesthetic approach of the remix, which it reinforces visually.

The direction of the video was entrusted to Nicolas Fransolet on the suggestion of Danilo Samà, a photographer and Mao's longtime collaborator in the artistic collective CortoCorto, which the two have run together for over twenty years. Danilo Samà had become familiar with the Belgian director's work during his years living in Brussels.

== Awards ==
| Year | Festival | Category | Result |
|---|---|---|---|
| 2026 | Ponza Film Festival | Best Music Video | Won |

== Credits and personnel ==
- Authors: Carlo Bertotti, Roberto Vernetti
- Composers: Carlo Bertotti, Roberto Vernetti
- Electric bass, acoustic guitars recorded and remix produced by Mauro "Mao" Gurlino at CortoCorto Studio (Turin, Italy) between May and June 2026
- Artistic production by Mauro "Mao" Gurlino
- Executive production by Mauro "Mao" Gurlino and Danilo Samà for CortoCorto
- Record label: Universal Music Italia S.r.l. / Ripley S.r.l.
- Publishing: Sony Music Publishing (Italy) S.r.l. / Gibilterra S.r.l.
- Distribution: Universal Music Italia S.r.l.
- Press office and radio/television promotion: CortoCorto
- Cover photography: Stefano Galuzzi
- Photographers: Marco Olivotto (Delta V) and Danilo Samà (Mao)
- Copyright administered by SIAE (Società Italiana degli Autori ed Editori)
- Related rights administered by ITSRIGHT
- Phonographic producer rights administered by SCF (Società Consortile Fonografici)
- Radio/Television programming date: 31 July 2026
- Release date: 31 July 2026
- Tonality: E minor
- BPM: 123
- Time signature: 4/4
- Camelot notation: 9A
- ISRC: ITF242600008
- UPC: 0881061325789
