= And Then We Met Impero =

EP by Meganoidi
- Released: 2005
- Genres: Math rock, Progressive rock, Alternative rock
- Length: 25:27
- Label: Green Fog Records

Meganoidi chronology
| Outside the Loop, Stupendo Sensation (2003) | And Then We Met Impero (2005) | Granvanoeli (2006) |

And Then We Met Impero is the name of the second EP of the Italian alternative rock band Meganoidi.

On this record, for the first time, the band deviates significantly from the preceding ska-core sounds, to arrive at Math rock and Progressive rock that will keep well in the following records.

== Track listing ==
1. And - 2:16
2. Then - 7:58
3. We - 5:13
4. Met - 1:55
5. Impero - 8:05
