= Welcome in Disagio =

Studio album by Meganoidi
- Released: 2012
- Genre: Progressive rock, Alternative rock
- Label: Green Fog Records

Meganoidi chronology
Al Posto Del Fuoco (2009)	Welcome in Disagio (2012)

Welcome in Disagio is the fifth album of the Italian alternative rock band Meganoidi, released in April 2012.

== Track listing ==
1. Ora esiste dopo non più
2. Luci dal porto
3. Finestre aperte
4. Milioni di pezzi
5. Ghiaccio
6. Quello che ti salta in mente
7. Ciao collera
8. Tutto chiaro
9. Occhi accesi
10. Quasi ad occhi chiusi
11. Ogni attimo
