= Ritornerai =

Single by Bruno Lauzi
- B-side: "Fa' come ti pare"
- Released: 1963
- Genre: Pop; bolero
- Label: Galleria del Corso / CGD
- Songwriter: Bruno Lauzi
- Producer: Teddy Reno

Bruno Lauzi singles chronology
"Sto cicchetton de un Gioan" (1963)	"Ritornerai" (1963)	"Viva la libertà" (1964)

Audio
- "Ritornerai" on YouTube

"Ritornerai" (lit. 'You'll come back') is a 1963 song written and recorded by Bruno Lauzi.

== Background ==
According to Lauzi, the song was composed in a few minutes, while he was waiting for a friend who had just gone out to buy cigarettes. Shortly after its release, Lauzi was conscripted to his military service and was unable to promote the song. In spite of that, "Ritornerai" turned to be Lauzi's first hit and breakthrough. The song was included in several film scores, notably Nanni Moretti's The Mass Is Ended and Ridley Scott's House of Gucci.

== Cover versions ==
Artists who also recorded the song include Delta V, Ornella Vanoni, Franco Battiato, Negramaro, Diodato, Fiorella Mannoia, Michele Bravi, Conny Vandenbos.

== Track listing ==
No.	Title	Writer(s)	Length
1.	"Ritornerai"	Bruno Lauzi	2:40
2.	"Fa' come ti pare"	Bruno Lauzi	3:00

== Charts ==
Bruno Lauzi version

Chart (1963)	Peak position
Italy (Musica e dischi)	10

Delta V version

Chart (2006)	Peak position
Italy (Musica e dischi)	38
