= OVO =

OVO may refer to:

- OVO (album), by Peter Gabriel, 2000
- OvO (band), an Italian rock band
- Ovo (Cirque du Soleil), a touring Cirque du Soleil show
- OVO (payment service), an Indonesian digital payment and fintech company
- OVO (video encyclopedia), an Italian- and English-language online reference
- OVO Energy, a British gas and electricity supplier
  - OVO Hydro, a multi-purpose indoor arena in Glasgow, Scotland sponsored by OVO Energy
- OVO Sound, a Canadian brand and record label founded by rapper and singer Drake
- OVÖ, a Swedish hip-hop duo
