= In fatti ostili RMX =

Remix album by Delta V
- Released: 31 July 2026
- Genres: Electronic; pop; singer-songwriter
- Length: 49:53
- Language: Italian
- Label: Universal Music Italia

Delta V chronology
In fatti ostili (2025)	In fatti ostili RMX (2026)

In fatti ostili RMX (stylised as In Fatti Ostili RMX) is a remix album by the Italian band Delta V, released on 31 July 2026 by Universal Music Italia.

== Background ==
The album collects reinterpretations of the tracks from Delta V's 2025 album In fatti ostili, entrusted to a range of artists and producers from the Italian alternative scene.

Delta V described the origin of the record by saying that they were connected in one way or another to every artist who produced the eleven remixes, that these were musicians they had come to know and admire over the years and had repeatedly worked with, and that what struck them most on hearing each new version was the discovery of entirely unfamiliar perspectives and fresh angles that let them listen anew to songs born in different contexts.

Writing for Martin Cid Magazine, Alice Lange observed that assigning each track to a different producer results in eleven parallel readings of the same subject, and characterised the record as a companion work rather than a supplement.

== Track listing ==
No.	Title	Writer(s)	Remixer	Length
1.	"Essere migliori" (Remix)	Carlo Bertotti	Werner Heike	4:16
2.	"Regole a Milano (Marittima)" (Remix)	Carlo Bertotti, Roberto Vernetti	Bologna Violenta	4:07
3.	"La disciplina del nulla" (Remix)	Carlo Bertotti	Jackf	5:43
4.	"Wendy" (Remix)	Carlo Bertotti, Roberto Vernetti	Mao	5:28
5.	"Storti" (Remix)	Carlo Bertotti	Arquitectura del Colapso	5:16
6.	"Panico" (Remix)	Carlo Bertotti	lezziero	4:32
7.	"Nazisti dell'Illinois" (IndieNoise Remix)	Carlo Bertotti, Roberto Vernetti	Eugene and Luca Urbani	4:08
8.	"Provincia meccanica" (Remix)	Carlo Bertotti	Livio Magnini	4:09
9.	"San Babila ore 20(25)" (Remix)	Carlo Bertotti	X.N.X	5:49
10.	"Laika e l'America" (Remix)	Carlo Bertotti	Madaski	3:52
11.	"I raggi B" (Remix)	Carlo Bertotti	Simone Olivotto	2:33
Total length:				49:53

== Music videos ==
Music videos were released for five tracks from the album:

- "Essere migliori" (Werner Heike Remix)
- "Regole a Milano (Marittima)" (Bologna Violenta Remix), directed by Carlo Bertotti
- "Panico" (lezziero Remix)
- "I raggi B" (Simone Olivotto Remix), directed by Marco Olivotto
- "Wendy" (Mao Remix), directed by Nicolas Fransolet and filmed in Tokyo

== Awards ==
Year	Festival	Category	Awarded video	Result
2026	Ponza Film Festival	Best Music Video	"Wendy (Remix)"	Won

== Personnel ==
- Record label – Universal Music Italia S.r.l. / Ripley S.r.l.
- Music publishing – Sony Music Publishing (Italy) S.r.l. and Gibilterra S.r.l.
- Distribution – Universal Music Italia S.r.l.
- Management – Gibilterra S.r.l.
- Cover photography – Stefano Galuzzi
- Authors' rights administered by SIAE
- Neighbouring rights administered by ITSRIGHT
- Phonographic producer's rights administered by SCF
