= Slim (band) =

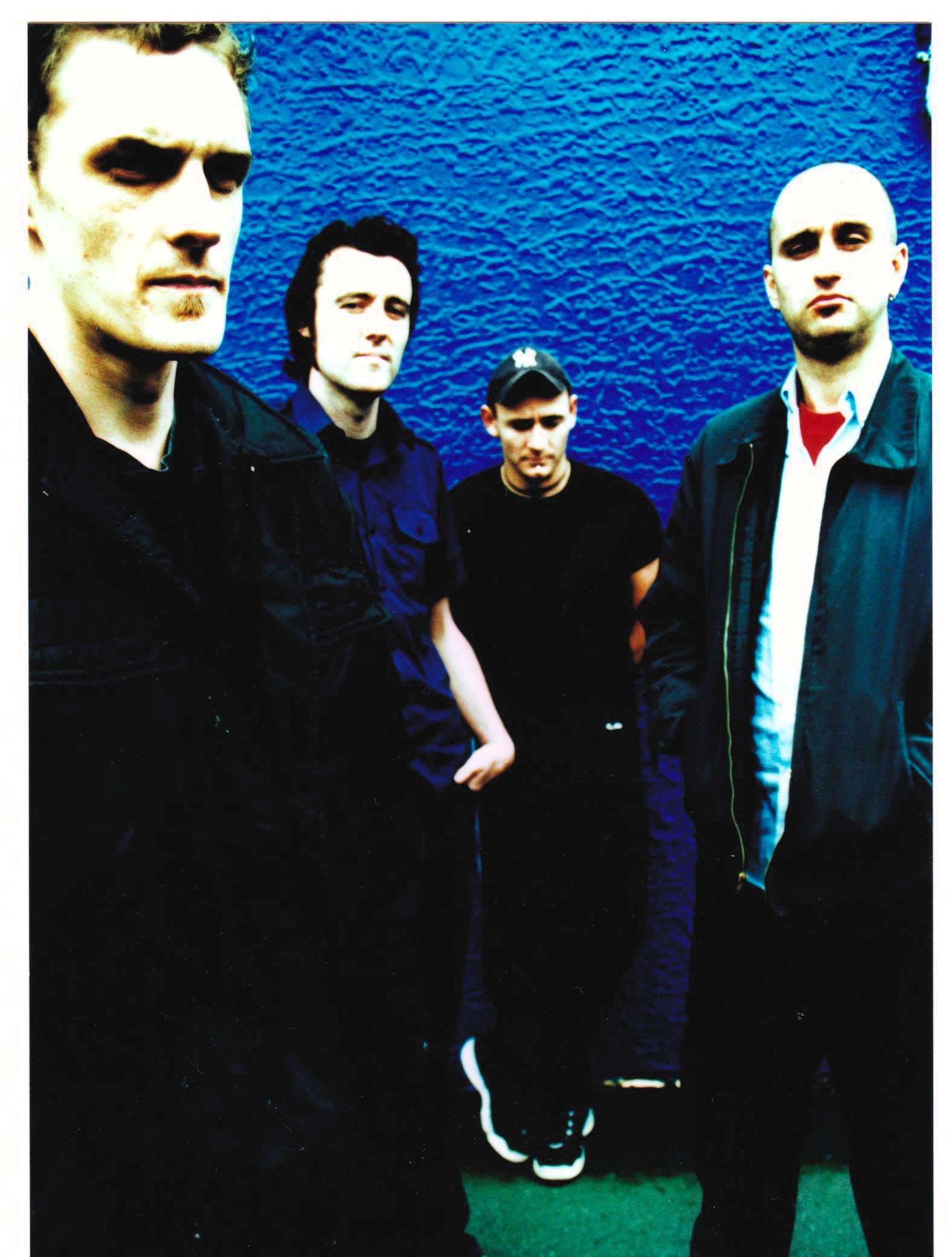
Slim in Christchurch circa 2000

Slim is a rock band initially lasting from the late 1990s to 2003 from Christchurch, New Zealand who are best known for their singles 'Rise Up', 'Real World', 'Crumbling', 'Low' and 'Bullet in My Hand'.They were signed to Wildside Records alongside fellow kiwi rockers Shihad and HLAH. They played notable shows with Korn, Tool, The Melvins, Rocket From The Crypt, Live, Creed, Regurgitator, Fur Patrol, Tadpole and Silverchair.

The members of the band were:

- Aaron Hogg (vocals, guitar)
- Donald McClure (vocals, bass)
- Scott Mason (drums, vocals)
- Simon Meehan (guitar)

As of 2025, Slim reunited with a new member, Theo Tudor (Hogg's son). Their first show back was as one of the headliners for the August Go Live festival at the Christchurch Town Hall. The band has also celebrated their reformation with a new album, 'Eating The Dirt - The '98 Demos'. It features tracks recorded in the late 90's, most of which had never been released. An extra single from the '98 demos, Christmas Dog, was released in December 2025. Theo has now been replaced by long-time Christchurch guitarist, Brendan Yates. The band will be heading into the studio to work on new music in October 2026.

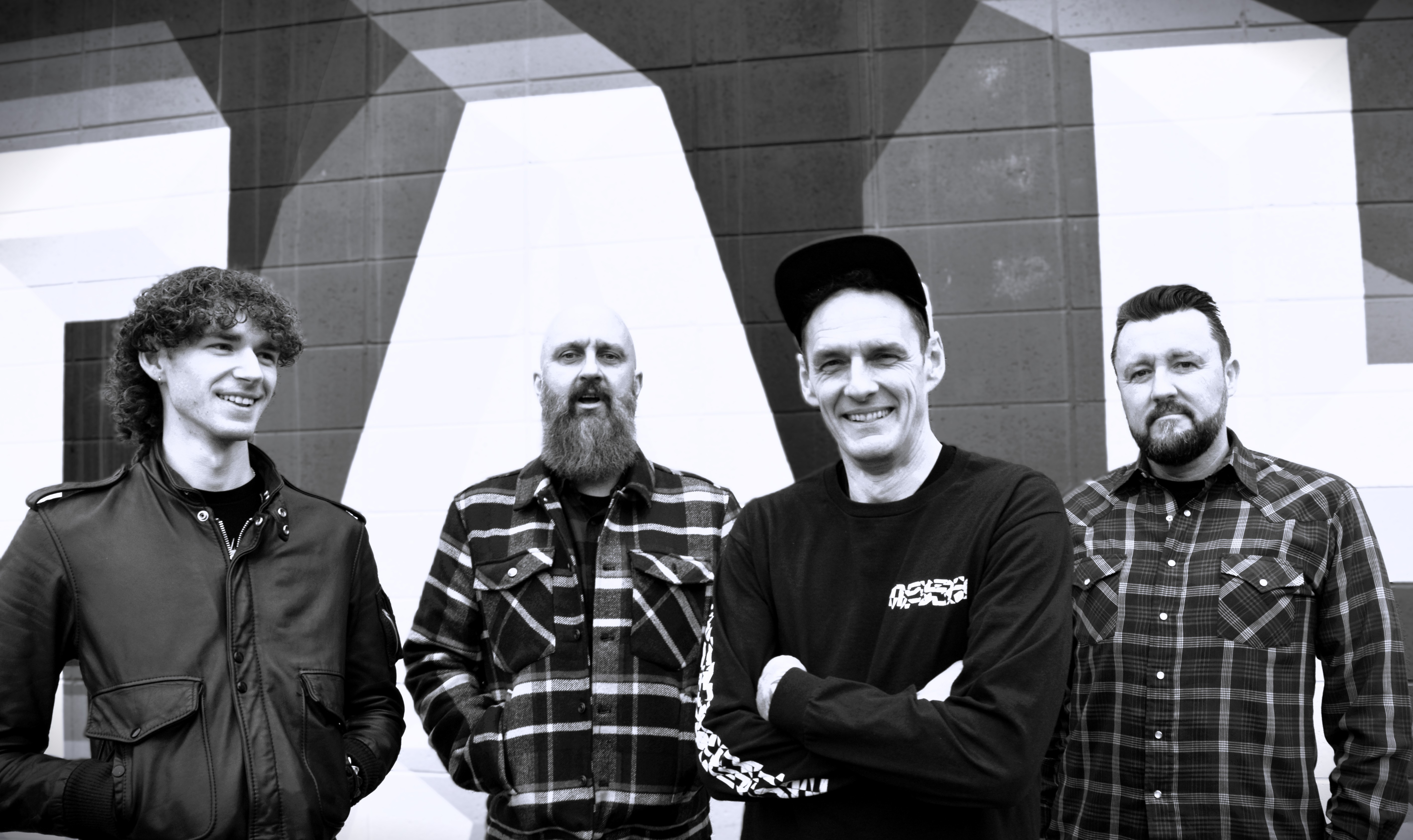
Slim in 2025
