= Delta-V (musical group) =

Italian pop band

Delta V
- Origin: Italy
- Genres: Pop, pop rock
- Years active: 1995 - present
- Labels: BMG Ricordi; Virgin Records
- Members: Carlo Bertotti; Flavio Ferri; Marti
- Past members: Alice Ricciardi; Lu Heredia; Gi Kalweit; Fefo Forconi; Francesca Tourè
- Website: http://www.deltav.it

Delta V is an Italian musical group formed in 1995. Its current line-up is composed of Carlo Bertotti, Flavio Ferri, Fefo Forconi and Francesca Tourè. They debuted in 1998 with the album Spazio, and their greatest hits are songs such as "Se telefonando" and "Un'estate fa". Their latest album is Heimat.

== Biography ==
=== 1990-1995 ===
Carlo Bertotti and Flavio Ferri met in school. In 1980, they both became part of Vienna, who in 1990 published the album Giù, senza fare rumore, which was unsuccessful. In 1992 they published Fiori blu, with Carlo as producer and Flavio as vocalist. After this, they decided to dedicate themselves entirely to creating music for advertising, until 1995, when MCA Music Italy signed them and created "Straker & Foster", a name inspired by characters in a cult television science fiction series, UFO.

=== 1996-2000 ===
In 1996, the pair began collaboration with Roberto Vernetti, a producer. The next year they signed a contract with BMG Memories. The group named themselves Delta V, from "Delta di Venere". Initially, the vocalist was Alice Ricciardi, but she left before the first album was recorded. She was replaced by Francesca Touré.

In early 1998, the group released their first singles, "AL.C" and "Il mondo visto dallo spazio", which helped them spread their name through radio and television, culminating in the release of their debut album, Spazio. It wasn't until their third single, a re-make of Mina's "Se telefonando" that Delta V entered 'heavy rotation' and became one of the "alternative" hits of the summer. In Autumn, a single from the album "Facile" was released to accompany the group's first national tour.

Following the tour, Carlo and Flavio began working on a second album, and decide to undertake new roads, leaving the 'trip-hop' of the debut for a more electronic pop. As a result, Francesca Tourè was replaced with vocalist Lu Heredia.

In 1999, they released their next album, Psychobeat, which was preceded by the single "Sul filo", accompanied by a successful video single "Il primo giorno del mondo", in which Angela Baraldi, Garbo and Mao appear, and a remixed version of "Marta ha fatto un sogno". This album wasn't as successful as their first, and today it is the only Delta V album not to be available.

In Spring 2000, the group did their "Per la bellezza tour", a tour across all Italy. The experience is chronicled in the song "L'infinito", which can be downloaded on-line.

=== 2001-2004 ===
In Autumn 2000, Carlo and Flavio started work on their new album, and recruited a new vocalist, American vocalist Georgeanne (Gi) Kalweit. In May 2001, a new single, "Un'estate fa" was released, and spent more than 20 weeks on the charts. It was accompanied by a music video and the group made numerous television appearances to produce hype for their third album, which was released in October, Monaco '74. They then toured Italy.

Roles were reversed for the fourth album: Carl wrote while Flavio produced. On February 13, 2004, the group released the single "Prendila così" (Lucio Battisti's cover), from their album Le Cose Cambiano, released on February 26. A music video was released, but triggered the ire of Battisti's widow, and was pulled off the air. The group began touring again with a new single "Via da qui".

=== 2005-present ===
In September 2004, the contract between Delta V and BMG Memories expired, cancelling future tour dates and the release of a third single from the album, "La costruzione di un errore". Gi left the group because of differences with the other members. In June 2005, BMG Memories released the "Delta V collection", a CD and DVD containing all the music videos of the group. The music label consulted neither Carlo nor Flavio, and the selection of tracks was criticized by fans.

Carlo and Flavio signed a 2-album contract with Flavio with Virgin Records, and work began on a new album in Autumn, in which Francesca Tourè returned as a vocalist, and the entry of Fefo Forconi into the Delta V roster.

In February 2006, a new single, "Adesso e mai", was released, and just over a month later, March 31, the fifth album of Delta V was released, Pioggia.Rosso.Acciaio, to critical acclaim, and a new single was released, a cover, "Ritornerai".

In August 2018, a new single, "Domeniche d'agosto" is released with the voice of the new singer Marti (Martina Albertini) and about a year later, the sixth album of Delta V is released, Heimat.

== Discography ==
Year	Title	Singles
1998	Spazio	Al.C - Gennaio 1998; Il Mondo Visto Dallo Spazio - Febbraio 1998; Se Telefonando - Maggio 1998; Facile (promo) - Settembre 1998
1999	Psychobeat	Sul Filo (promo) - Luglio 1999; Il Primo Giorno Del Mondo (promo) - Novembre 1999; Marta Ha Fatto Un Sogno REMIX (promo) - Marzo 2000
2001	Monaco '74	Un'Estate Fa - Giugno 2001; Numeri In Mia Vita (promo) - Ottobre 2001; Un Colpo In Un Istante REMIX - marzo 2002
2004	Le Cose Cambiano	Prendila Così - Gennaio 2004; Via Da Qui REMIX - Giugno 2004
2005	Collection	-
2006	Pioggia.Rosso.Acciaio	Adesso e Mai - Febbraio 2006; Ritornerai - Maggio 2006; Fuori Controllo REMIX (promo) - Ottobre 2006
2019	Heimat	
2025	In fatti ostili	
2026	In fatti ostili RMX	
