= Various authors =

The expression "various authors" is used to credit creative works which are the result of a collaboration. In English it is more common to describe the authors of such a compilation collectively, for example by saying for what occasion the texts were written or by naming one writer, for example the first one in the alphabet, and then adding et al.

It may be abbreviated as Vv.Aa., which is rarely used in English except by non-native speakers, who look for an exact equivalent to similar terms (usually abbreviated Aa.Vv.) in Italian, Spanish, and some other languages. The expansion of the acronym is the Latin expression auctores varii.

== See also ==
- Various artists
