= Lost Love =

Lost Love or Lost Loves may refer to:

== Books ==
- Lost Love, a 1984 romantic novel by Carole Mortimer
- Lost love, a 1970 Marathi-language novel by Gauri Deshpande

== Film and TV ==
- Lost Love, or Izhandha Kadhal, a 1941 Tamil film
- Lost Love (1951 film), a Mexican musical drama film
- "Lost Love", a 1975 episode of The Six Million Dollar Man
- "Lost Love", a two-part 1987 episode of MacGyver
- Lost Love (2003 film), an Italian film also known as Perduto amor
- Lost Loves (film), a 2010 Cambodian film
- Lost Love (2022 film), a Hong Kong film by Ka Sing-fung

== Music ==
=== Albums ===
- Lost Loves (album) by Minus the Bear 2014

=== Songs ===
- "Lost Love", a 1951 song by Percy Mayfield
- "Lost Love", a 1958 song by Bobby Darin on the B-side of "Queen of the Hop"
- "Lost Love", a 1961 song by H. B. Barnum and covered by Ann-Margret
- "Lost Love", a song by Bert Jansch from A Rare Conundrum
- "Lost Love", a song by Loudon Wainwright III from I'm Alright
- "Lost Love", a 2005 Molella remix of Fra Lippo Lippi's "Shouldn't Have to Be Like That"
- "Lost Love", a song by Meatloaf, from If You Really Want To\
- "Lost Love", a 2004 song by The Dirtbombs
- "Lost Love", a 1967 song by Mandala
- "Lost Love", a 1964 song by The Shirelles
- "Lost Love", a 1967 song by The Sonics

== See also ==
- Lost For Love, an 1874 work by Mary Elizabeth Braddon
- Love Lost (disambiguation)
