= Los Fastidios =

Italian Oi! band

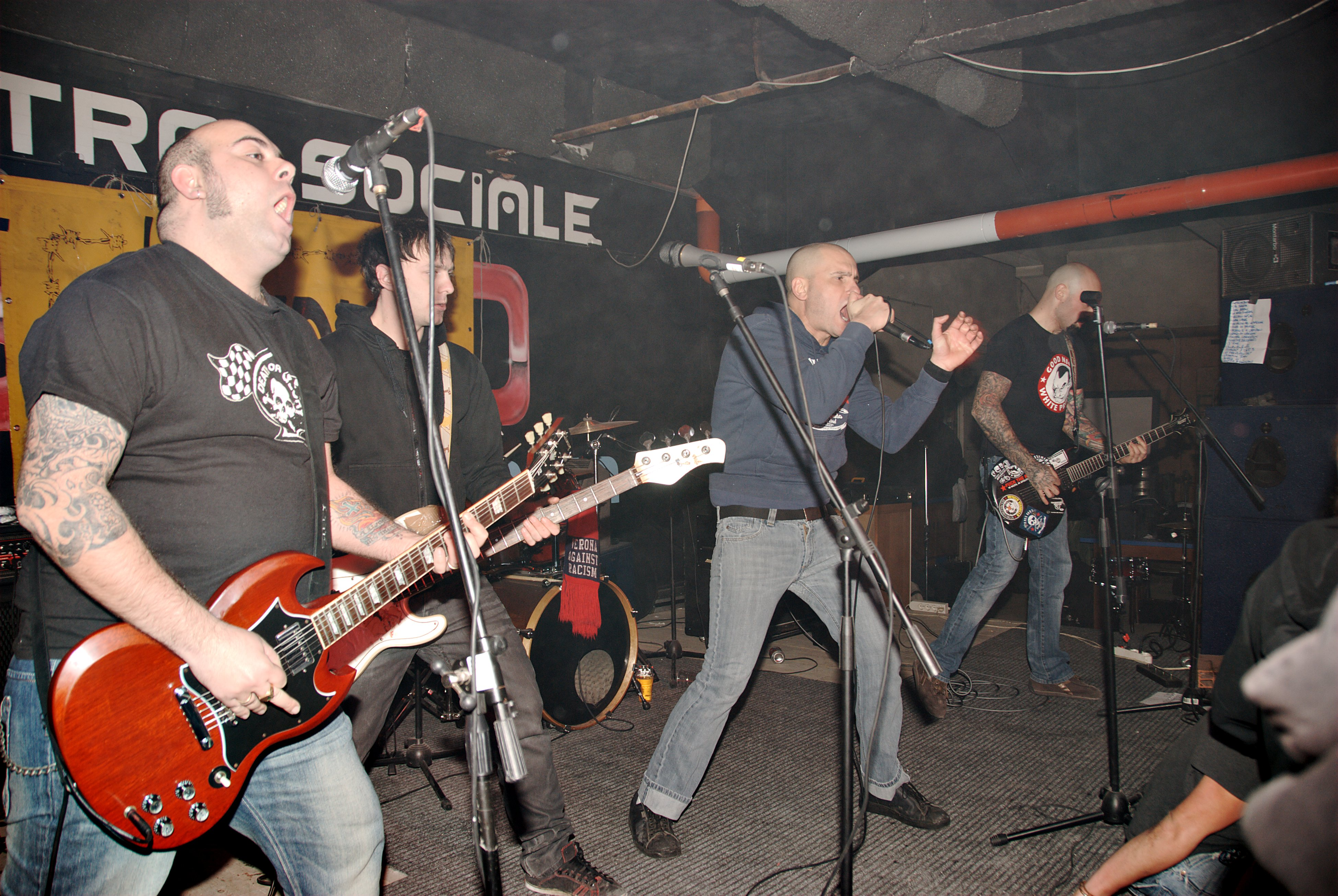
Los Fastidios in Trento (2009)

Los Fastidios is an Italian Oi! band. It was formed in Verona in 1991, however only one of the original band members remains. Songs of Los Fastidios deal with common life situations, as well as promoting equality, socialism and fight against discrimination. The band is often identified with the SHARP movement.

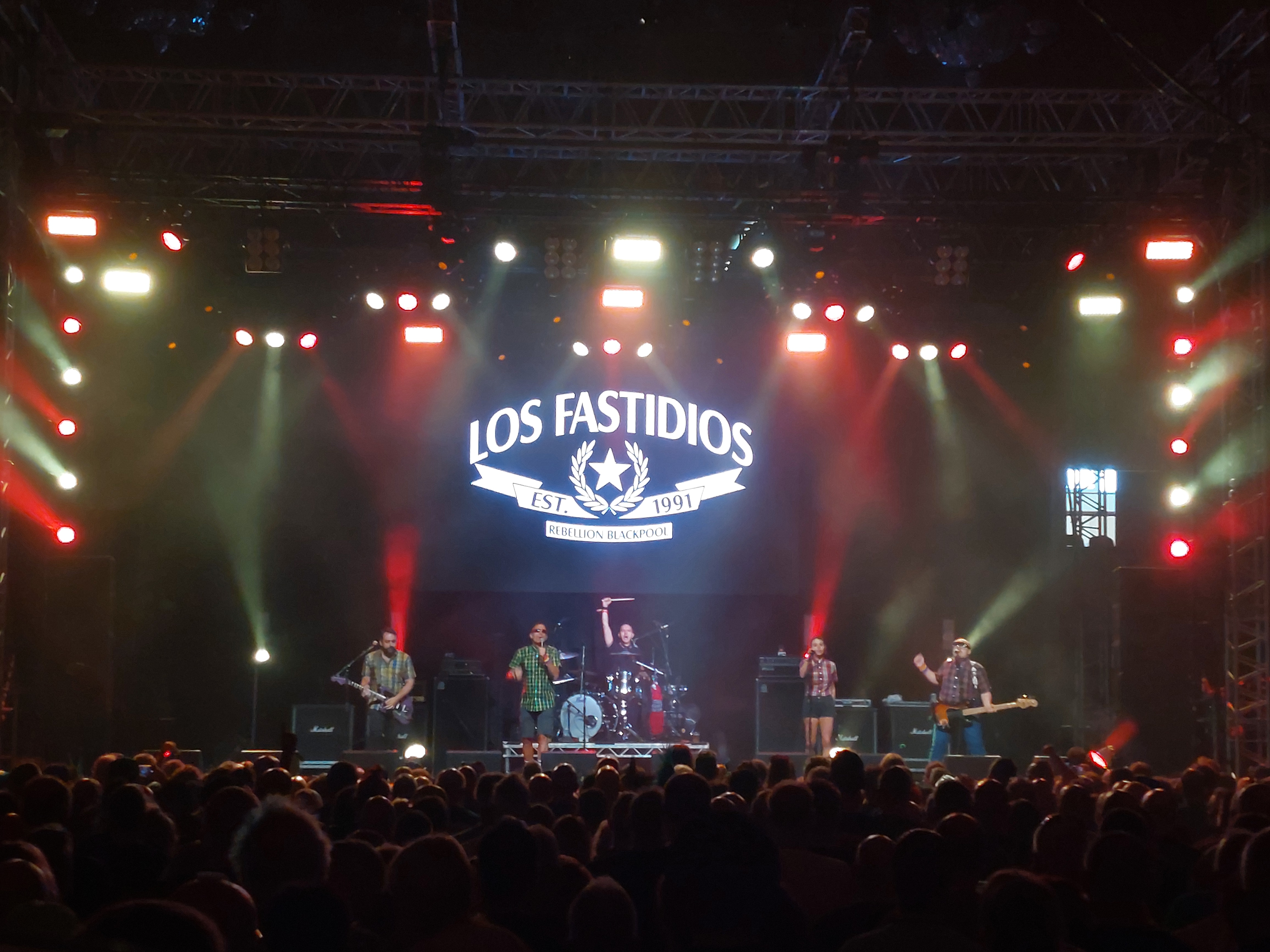
Los Fastidios at the Rebellion Festival in Blackpool, England in 2024.

Since 2009 the band members are:

- Enrico (vocals)
- Mario (guitar and vocals)
- Luca (bass guitar and vocals)
- Luca "Dave" (drums and vocals)

On 2025 members are:

- Enrico (vocals since always)
- Filippo "Bibol" (guitar and vocals since 2020)
- Midio (bass and vocals since 2020)
- Elisa Dixan (vocals since 2020)
- Mattia (drums and vocals since 2020)
- Simone "Coppi"(2nd drummer)

== Discography ==
- Birra, oi! e divertimento (EP 7" Skooter Rekords, 1994)
- Banana e scarponi (EP 7" Skooter Rekords, 1995)
- Hasta la baldoria (LP Skooter Rekords, 1996 - CD Repressed by KOB Records/Mad Butcher Records)
- Oi! Gio (EP 7" Skooter Rekords, 1997)
- Contiamo su di voi! (LP/CD/CS KOB Records/Mad Butcher Records, 1998)
- Radio boots (EP 7" KOB Records/Mad Butcher Records, 2000)
- Fetter Skinhead (EP CD KOB Records/Mad Butcher Records, 2000)
- 1991 - 2001 Ten years tattooed on my heart (CD KOB Records/Mad Butcher Records, 2001)
- Guardo Avanti (LP/CD KOB Records/Mad Butcher Records/Jimmy Jazz Records, 2001)
- Ora Basta (EP 7"/CD KOB Records/Mad Butcher Records, 2003)
- La verdadera fuerza de la calle (CD Amp Records Buenos Aires, 2003)
- Prawdziwa sila ulicy (CD Jimmy Jazz Records Poland, 2003)
- Siempre Contra (LP/CD/CS KOB Records/Mad Butcher Records/Jimmy Jazz Records, 2004)
- Sopra e Sotto il palco (live '04) (LP/CD KOB Records/Mad Butcher Records, 2005)
- On The Road....Siempre Tuor! (DVD KOB Records/Mad Butcher Records, 2005)
- Rebels 'N' Revels (LP/CD KOB Records, 2006)
- Un Calcio ad un Pallone (EP 7"/CD KOB Records/Mad Butcher Records, 2006)
- Fetter Skinhead in 2007 (EP 7" KOB Records/Mad Butcher Records, 2007)
- All´ Arrembaggio (LP/CD KOB Records/Mad Butcher Records, 2009)
- Let's do it (LP/CD Kob Records, 2014)
