= Andrea Pezzi =

Italian Tv presenter and entrepreneur

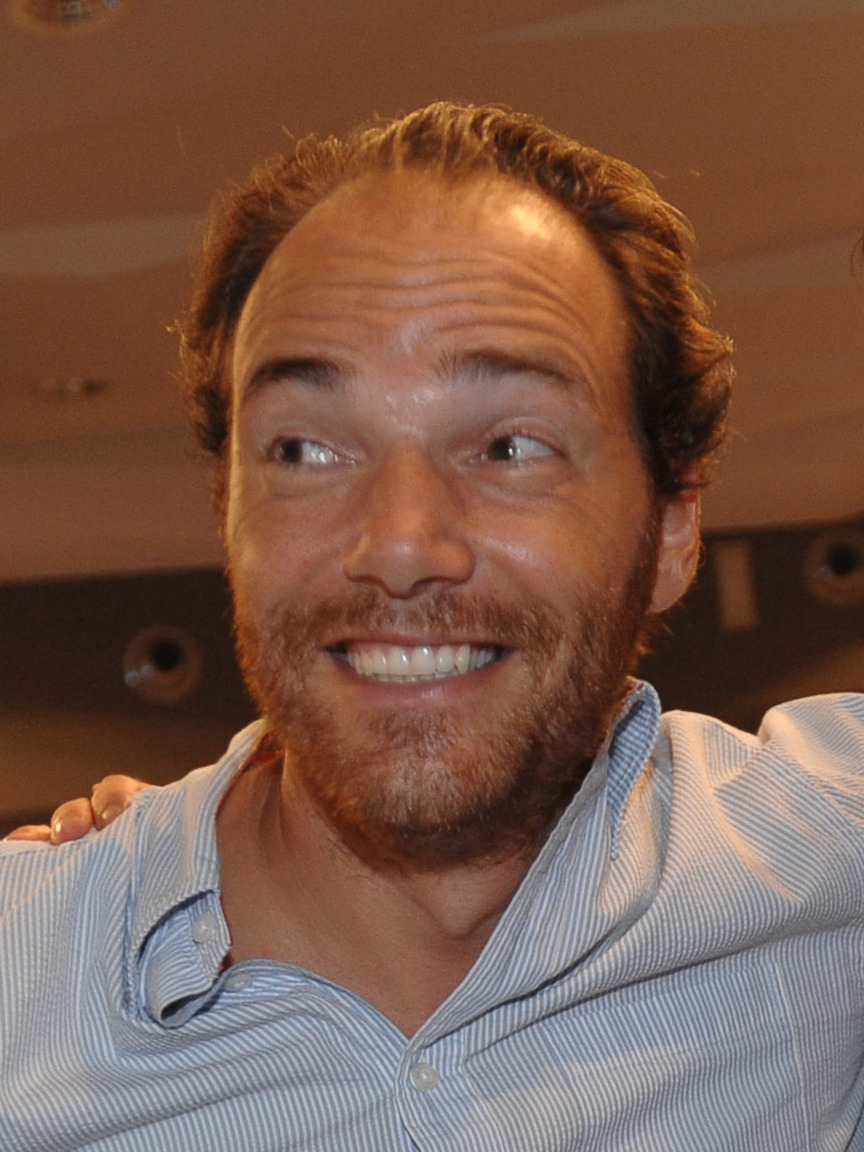
- Pezzi in 2012
- Born: 21 November 1973 (age 52); Ravenna, Italy
- Occupations: DJ, VJ, TV presenter, writer, entrepreneur
- Partner: Cristiana Capotondi (2005—present)
- Website: Official website

Andrea Pezzi (born November 21, 1973, Ravenna, Italy) is an Italian TV presenter and entrepreneur. He made his debut as a DJ for Radio Deejay and later became a video jockey for MTV Europe and MTV Italia from 1996 to 2003. Pezzi later moved to RAI and Mediaset to work as a television host.

From 2001 to 2006 Pezzi was a communication advisor for international companies focused on the youth target (among them Nike, L'Oreal, Diesel, etc.). At the same time he was a columnist for the financial newspaper Il Sole 24 Ore.

In 2006 he founded OVO, a media company that produces short encyclopaedic documentary videos for media platforms. In 2014 Pezzi founded Myntelligence, a platform for digital advertising automation.
