= OVO (video encyclopedia) =

OVO is an online video encyclopedia available in Italian and English, which was officially launched in December 2010. The project aims at publishing video entries on an array of topics, on the model of traditional encyclopedias. The creation of these entries is outsourced to partners all over the world and their quality is guaranteed by the patronage and supervision of the Istituto Treccani, which is appointed to checking the accuracy of the information.

== Layout and content ==
After the launch, the layout of the website and the structure of the published content underwent various changes. In its latest version, the website can be navigated through five main categories:

- Pedia: a video encyclopedia covering topics such as art and design, cinema, culture, finance, history, science and health, sports, and tourism;
- Bio: a video collection of notable figures such as artists and creatives, athletes, entrepreneurs, intellectuals and scientists, and politicians and soldiers;
- Take: a collection of brief video commentaries on some of the most discussed issues in current affairs;
- Intelligence: a collection of video reportages on some the most controversial themes of our times;
- Think: a collection of video interviews with contemporary prominent figures in various fields of knowledge;

== See also ==
- Andrea Pezzi
