= Love Lost =

Love Lost may refer to:

- Love Lost (album), a 1959 album by the Four Freshmen
- "Love Lost" (song), a 2009 single by the Temper Trap
- "Love Lost", a song by Mac Miller from his 2011 mixtape I Love Life, Thank You that samples the Temper Trap song

== See also ==
- Lost Love (disambiguation)
