= Meganoidi =

Italian rock band

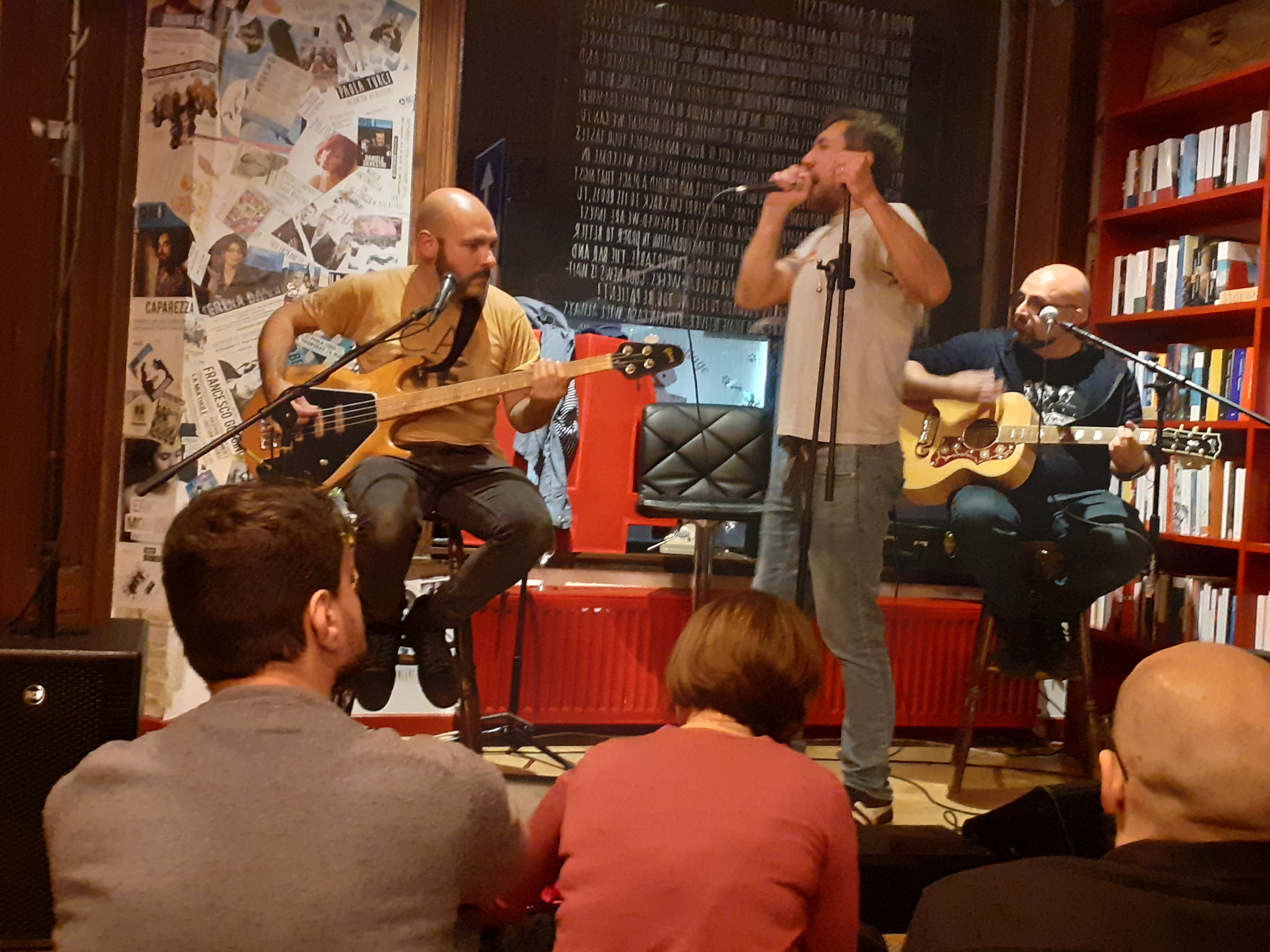
- Live in Brussels, 2021

Background information
- Origin: Genoa, Italy
- Genres: Alternative rock Ska punk Punk rock Progressive rock
- Years active: 1997–present
- Members: Davide Di Muzio; Mattia Cominotto; Luca Guercio; Riccardo Armeni; Fabrizio Sferrazza; Saverio Malaspina
- Past members: Francis "Cisco" Di Roberto; Fabrizio Sferrazza
- Website: http://www.meganoidi.it

Meganoidi is an Italian rock band from Genoa. Initially ska-core with veins of punk, the band has changed over the years, with the style now trending towards progressive rock.

== Biography ==
The group was formed in 1997 in Genoa. Its name comes from the main antagonists from the anime series Daitarn 3 ("We Meganoidi are the ones who / never win a battle against Daitarn 3 / ..."). The group was initially composed of voice, guitar, bass and drums, and included a trumpet the next year. In the same year, the band released its first set of demos, Supereroi vs Municipale, composed of five songs.

Three years later, the band added a saxophonist and a percussionist (Francis "Cisco" Di Roberto) and made its first album, Into the Darkness, Into the Moda. This album reveals influences of ska punk or ska-core and punk rock.

"King of ska e Supereroi", a single from the album Into the Darkness, Into the Moda, became the theme for the TV program Le Iene.

=== After the G8 ===
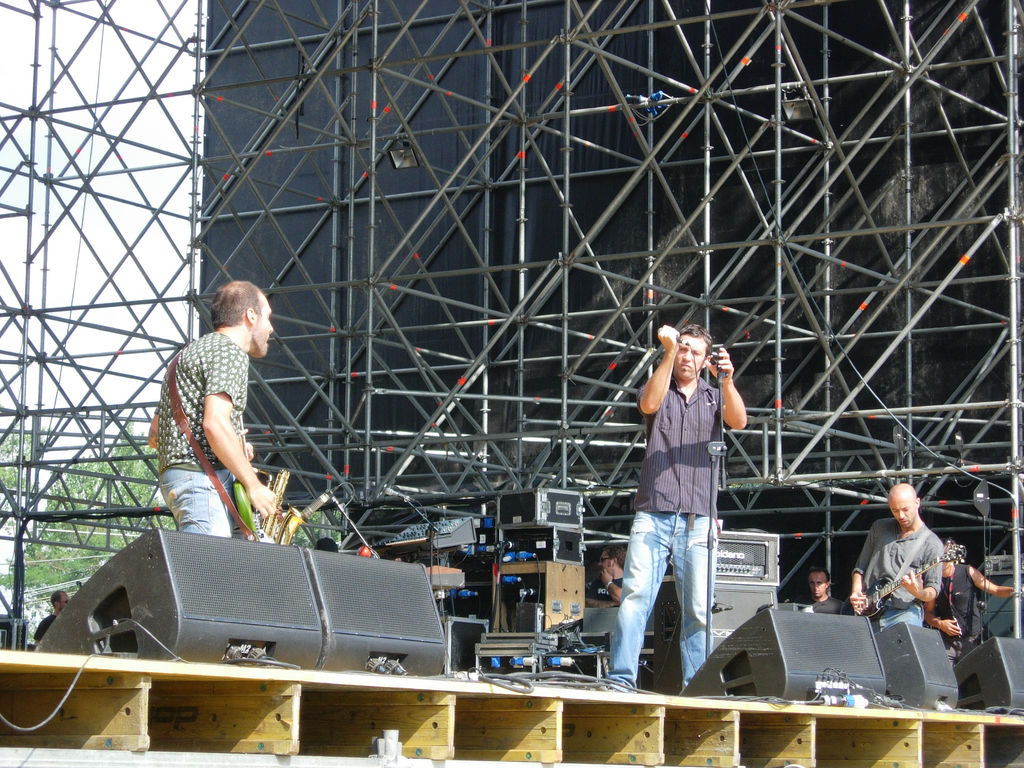
Meganoidi concert in 2006

In its next album, the band migrated to a more experimental alternative rock sound. This change in style is associated with a change in mentality, due to events during the G8 in Genoa. Meganoidi began to feel "out of the loop", based on the title of the album Inside the Loop and the song of the same name.

The band's lack of funds did not affect the quality of its recording. The new album was recorded at the Green Fog Studio, mixed in Canada by Vic Florentia (who had already worked for Tool and Danko Jones) and burned by Joe Lambert at Classic Sound in New York. The album comes under the independent label Green Fog Records, created by the group to support independent music. The CD was sold at €13 as a sign of opposition to the ideology of record companies.

In May 2005, And Then We Met Impero, a progressive rock EP with a melancholy sound, was released. This album points to influences from Pink Floyd, but was criticized by early fans.

On 28 April 2006, the third album, Granvanoeli, was released. The style is similar to And Then We Met Impero, but the songs are slower and five tracks are sung in Italian. Two music videos were filmed for the tracks "Dai pozzi" and "Un approdo."

The band's most recent album, Mescla, was released on March 6 2020.

== Band members ==
=== Current ===
- Davide Di Muzio - voice
- Luca Guercio - trumpet and guitar
- Andrea Torretta - guitar
- Riccardo Armeni - bass
- Saverio Malaspina - drums

=== Past members ===
- Francesco "Cisco" Di Roberto - percussion
- Fabrizio Sferrazza - saxophone and synthesizers

== Discography ==
- 1998 - Supereroi vs Municipale (EP)
- 2001 - Into the Darkness, Into the Moda
- 2003 - Outside the Loop, Stupendo Sensation
- 2005 - And Then We Met Impero (EP)
- 2006 - Granvanoeli
- 2009 - Al posto del Fuoco
- 2012 - Welcome in Disagio
- 2018 - Delirio Experience
- 2020 - Mescla

== Festivals ==
- Independent Days Festival (main stage), Bologna - 2005
