= Persiana Jones =

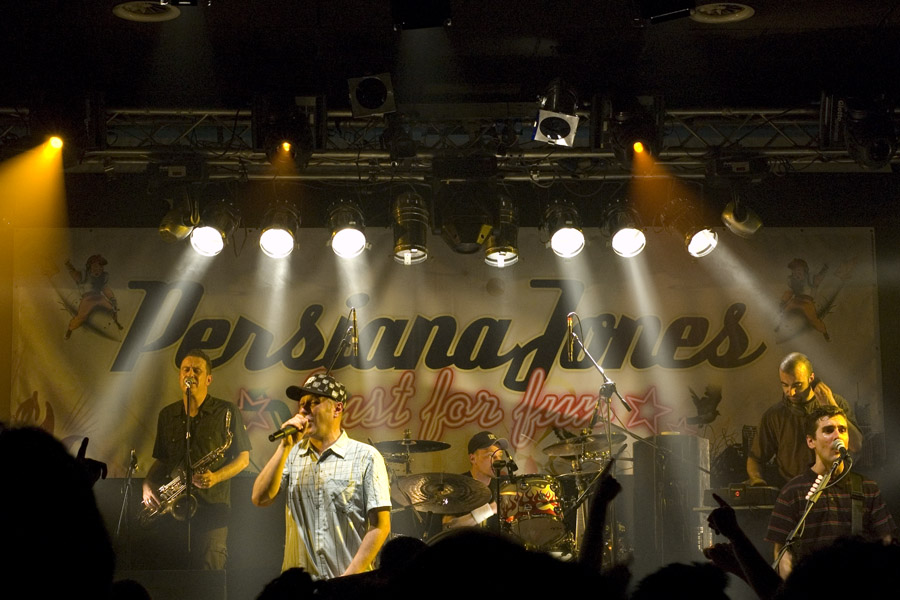
Persiana Jones, 6 April 2007.

Persiana Jones is an Italian ska punk band formed in 1988.

They have appeared on Italian television numerous times and toured countries like Austria, France, Germany, Netherlands, Slovakia, Spain, Switzerland and the Czech Republic.
