= Donnelly and Cooper =

Irish ballad

"Donnelly and Cooper" is an Irish ballad recounting a historic bare-knuckle boxing match between Dan Donnelly and George Cooper.

== Description ==
The ballad describes the meeting of the Irish boxer, Donnelly, and his English opponent, Cooper. At the start of the fight, the odds were 10:1 in Cooper's favour. During the match, each fighter in turn scores knockdown blows. After Cooper scores what appears to be a winning blow, the sister of Donnelly's trainer exhorts him to get up, informing him that she has bet her entire estate on his victory. Donnelly rises and is triumphant.

The author of the ballad is unknown.

The ballad has been in circulation since circa 1845. The earliest verifiable date found in publication is 1854.

The contest depicted in the song took place on 13 November 1815, at the Curragh of Kildare in Ireland. In honour of his victory, the location of the bout was renamed Donnelly's Hollow, and a commemorative monument was later erected on the site.

Multiple variants of the lyrics have been published in folk music collections.

In the mid 19th century, the ballad passed from the oral tradition into publication through the printing of broadsides in Great Britain, Ireland, and the United States.

Another of Donnelly's ring victories is the subject of the ballad "Donnelly and Oliver". The theme of the proud Irishman in a bare-fist fight is repeated in "Morrissey and the Black", "Morrissey and the Russian Sailor", and "Heenan and Sayers".

"Donnelly and Cooper" is set to the tune of "I'm the Boy Can Do It". The melody was later used in "Morrissey and the Russian Sailor", "Heenan and Sayers", and "Relief for Ireland".
