= The Curragh =

Flat, open plain in County Kildare, Ireland

The Curragh The Curragh of Kildare
- Plain
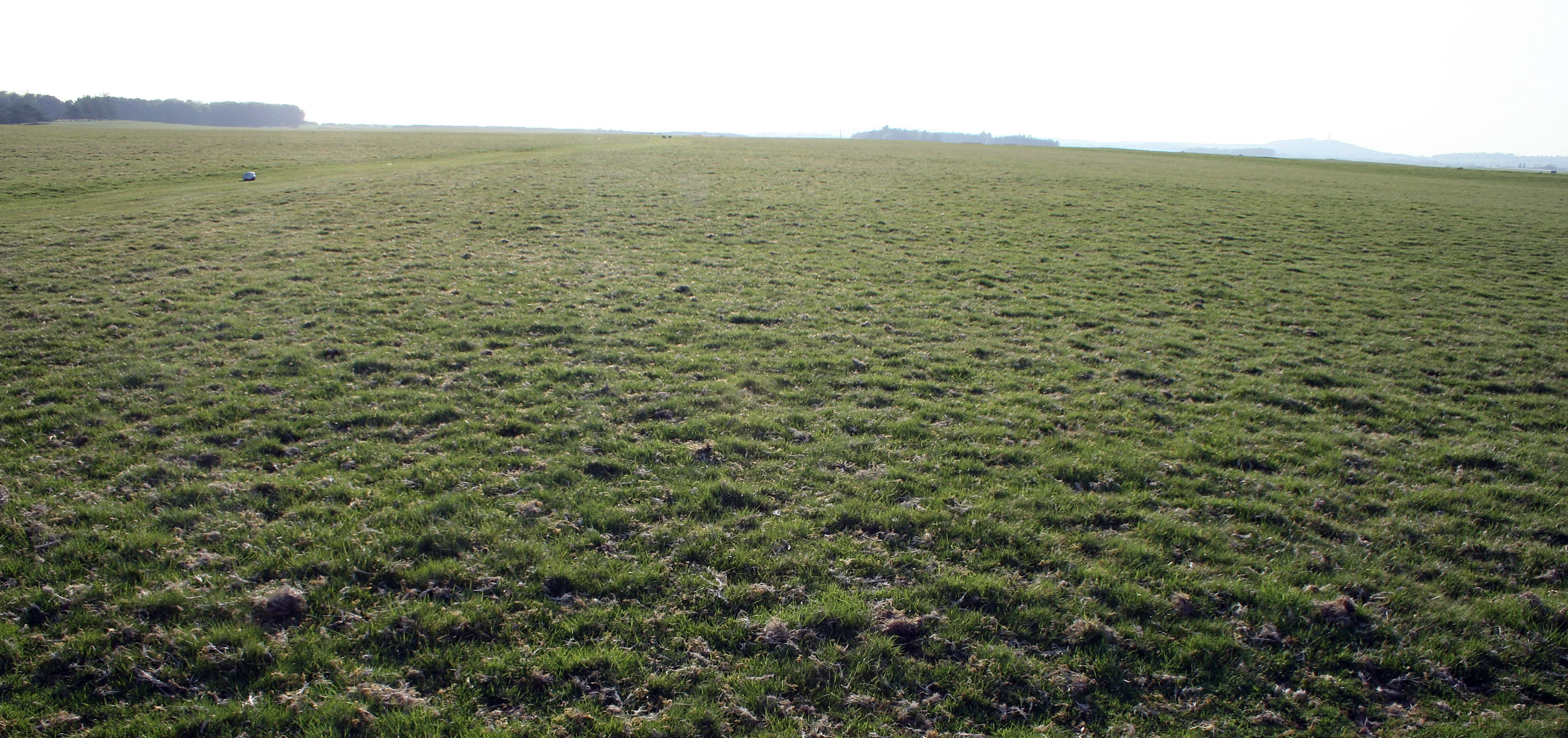

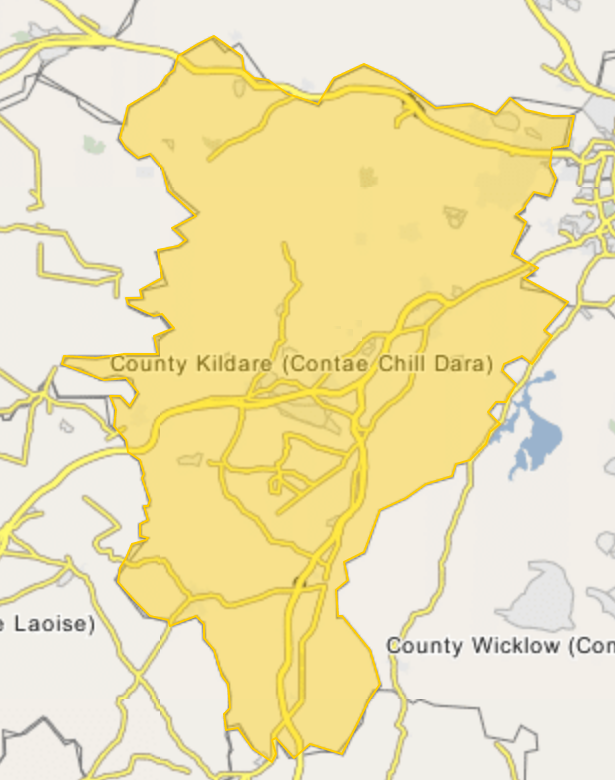
- Location within Ireland Location within County Kildare
- Coordinates: 53°09′27″N 06°50′24″W
- Part of: Central Plain

Area
  - Total: 19.71 square kilometres (7.61 sq mi; 4,870 acres)
- Elevation: 30 m (98 ft)

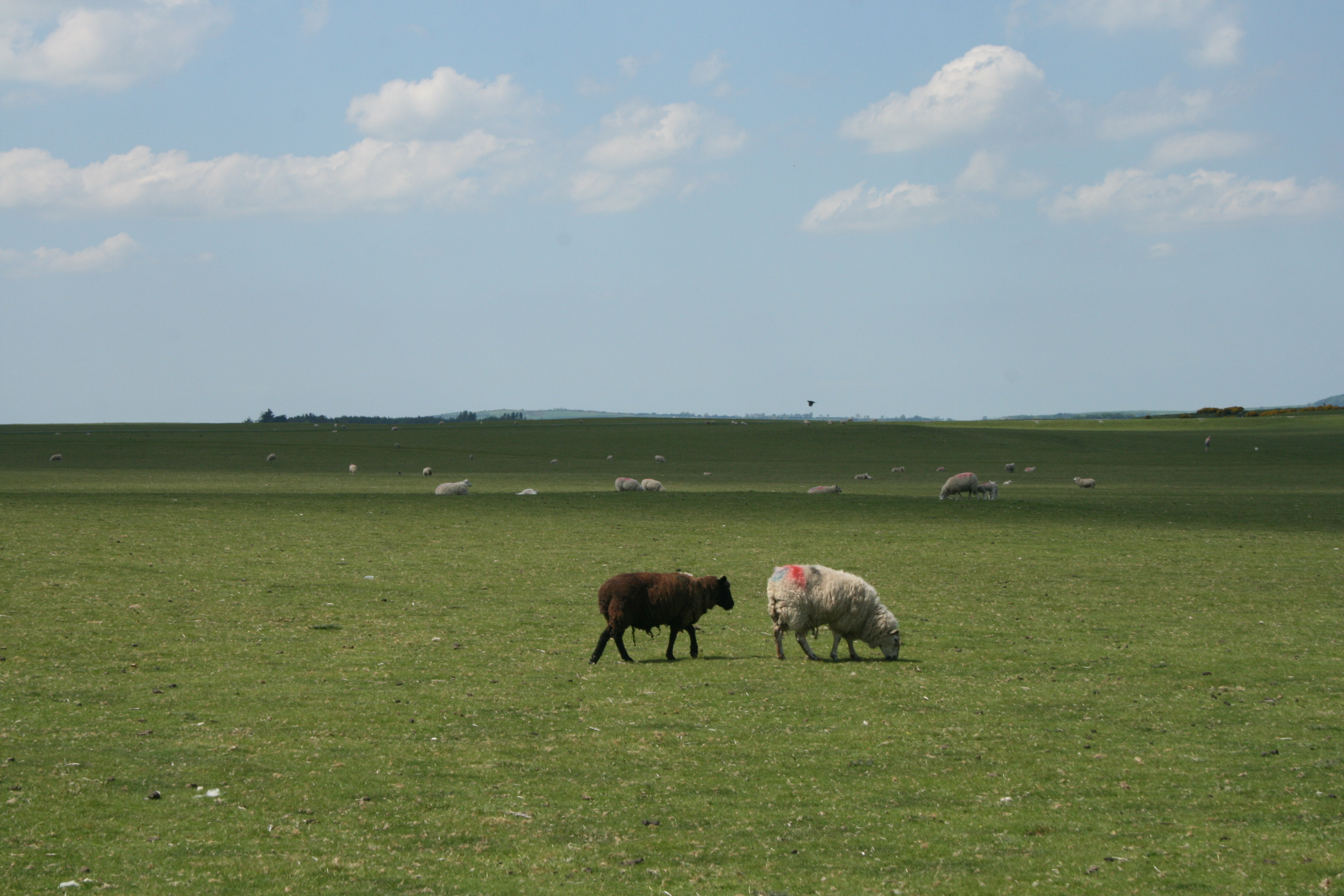
Sheep grazing on the Curragh plain

The Curragh (/ˈkʌrə/ KURR-ə; Irish: An Currach [ənˠ ˈkʊɾˠəx]) is a flat open plain in County Kildare, Ireland. Landmarks include the Irish National Stud on the edge of Kildare town and the Japanese Gardens, and Pollardstown Fen, the largest fen in Ireland, which attracts numerous bird species.

It is composed of a sandy soil, formed after an esker deposited a sand load, with excellent drainage characteristics.

== History ==
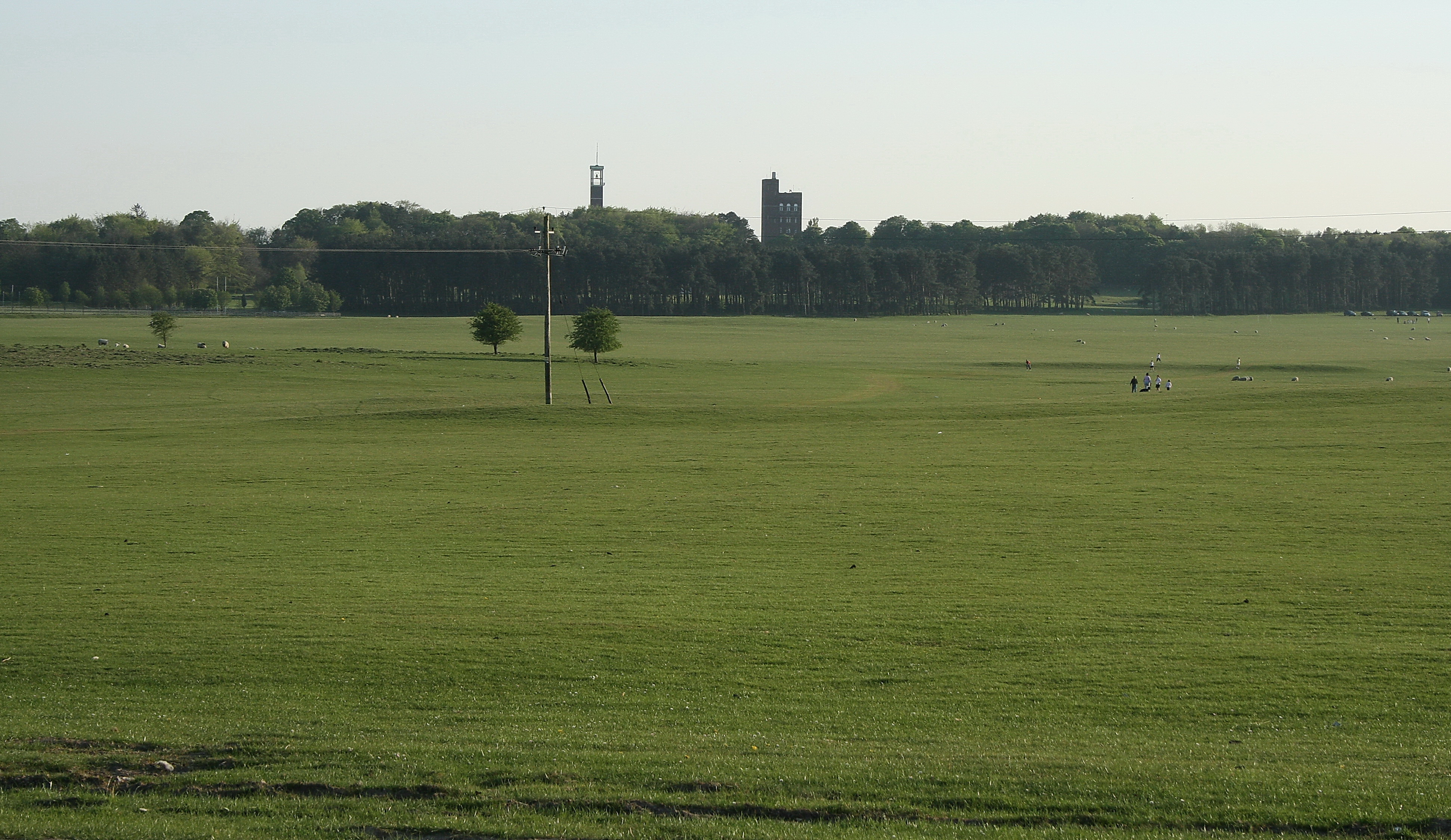
Curragh Camp

Used as a meeting site during Pre-Christian societies, the Curragh is shrouded in mythology. The hill to the north of the Curragh is called the Hill of Allen (Almhain) and is the purported meeting place of the mythical Fianna. Legend has it that in about 480 AD, when St Brigid became intent on founding a monastery in Kildare, she asked the High King of Leinster for the land on which to build it. When he granted her as much land as her cloak would cover, she then placed her cloak on the ground to cover the entire Curragh plain.

On 1 April 1234, The 3rd Earl of Pembroke lost a battle at the Curragh against a group of men loyal to Henry III of England. Lord Pembroke was wounded in the battle and died at his castle at Kilkenny on 16 April.

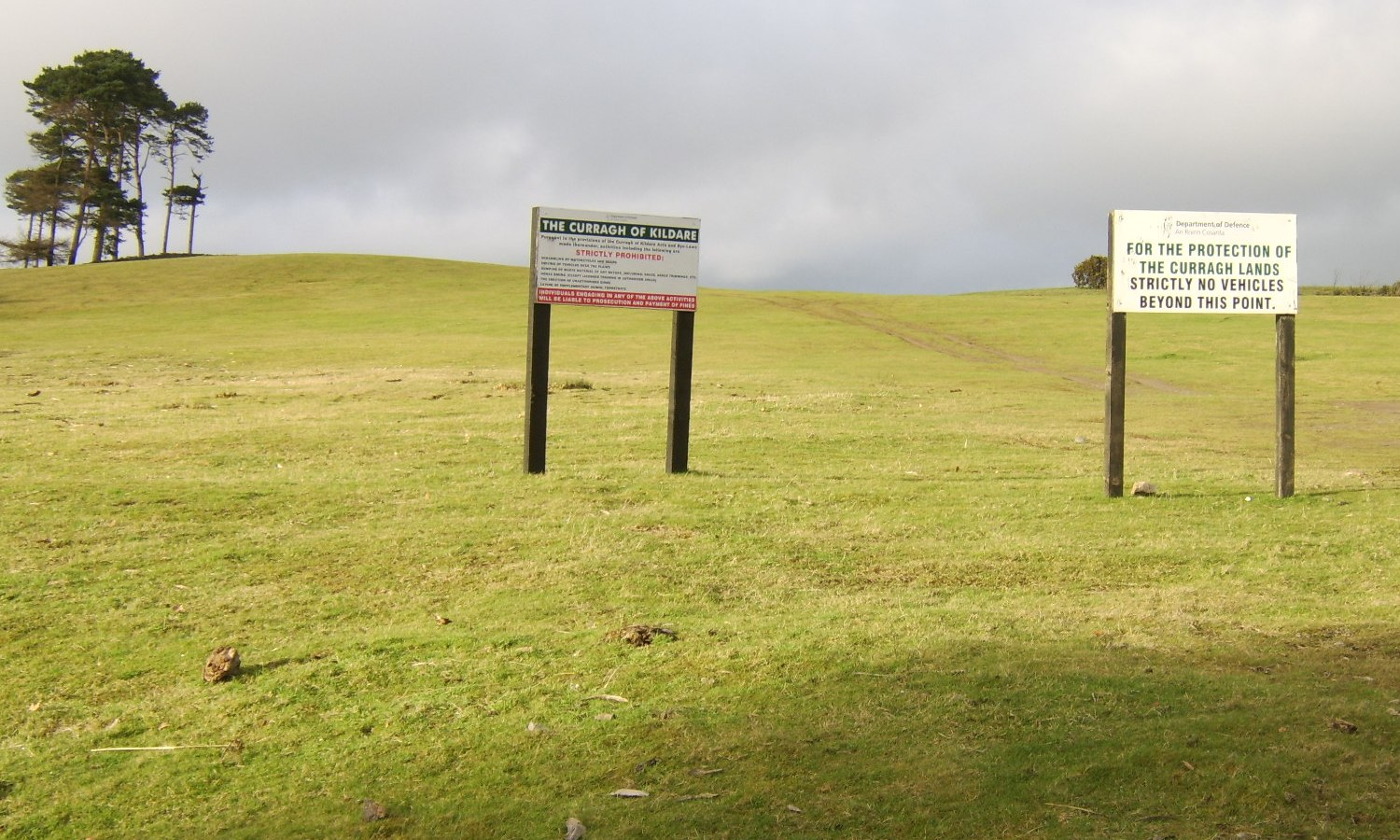
The Curragh with warning signs

It was a common site for mustering the armies of the Pale (see Essex in Ireland). During the 1798 Rebellion there was a massacre in the Curragh at Gibbet Rath. The Curragh Camp is now located there, where the Irish Defence Forces undergo training.

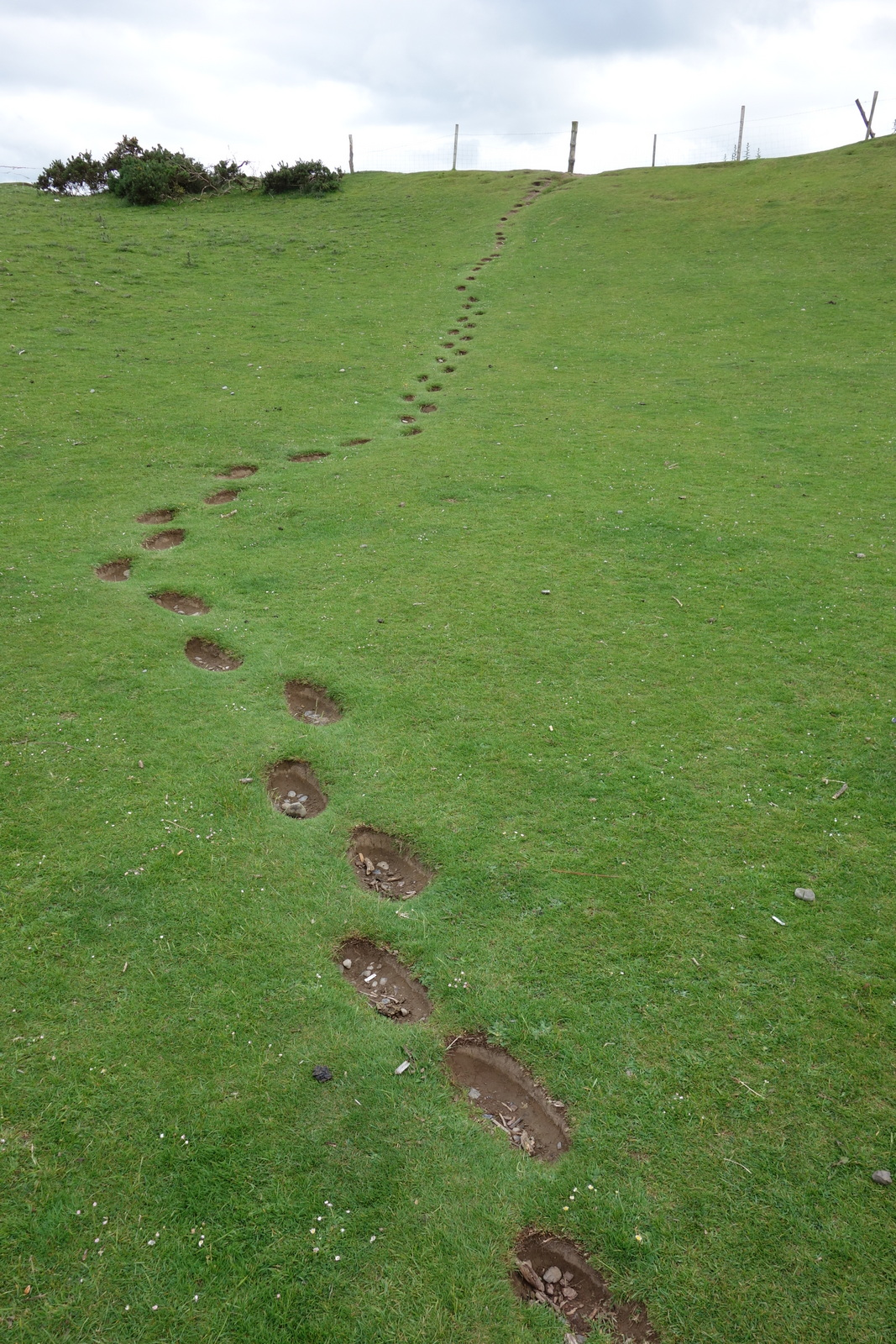
Footsteps of Dan Donnelly at Donnelly's Hollow

At a natural bowl-shaped amphitheatre on the Curragh known locally as Donnelly's Hollow the Irish champion boxer Dan Donnelly defeated the English champion George Cooper in 1815, before a large crowd. Donnelly had a famed reach and the remains of his arm were on show until recently in the Hideout Pub in the nearby town of Kilcullen.

In 1866, a commission was appointed by the British Treasury to report into the use made of the Curragh and make recommendations on legislation. It reported in 1868, and led to the Curragh of Kildare Act 1868 (31 & 32 Vict. c. 60).

On 2 January 1941 the Curragh was bombed by the Luftwaffe, the air force of the Third Reich, causing slight damage. One SC250 bomb remains unaccounted for.

== Legal recognition ==
Curragh of Kildare Act 1868 (Note: Section 1.)
- Act of Parliament
- Parliament of the United Kingdom
- Long title: An Act to make better Provision for the Management and Use of the Curragh of Kildare.
- Citation: 31 & 32 Vict. c. 60
- Territorial extent: United Kingdom

Dates
- Royal assent: 16 July 1868
- Commencement: 16 July 1868 (Note: The Acts of Parliament (Commencement) Act 1793.)
- Repealed: 5 November 1993

Other legislation
- Amended by: Curragh of Kildare Act 1961
- Repealed by: Statute Law (Repeals) Act 1993

Status: Repealed

Text of statute as originally enacted

Curragh of Kildare Act 1870 (Note: Section 7.)
- Act of Parliament
- Parliament of the United Kingdom
- Long title: An Act to confirm the Award under "The Curragh of Kildare Act, 1868." and for other purposes relating thereto.
- Citation: 33 & 34 Vict. c. 74
- Territorial extent: United Kingdom

Dates
- Royal assent: 9 August 1870
- Commencement: 9 August 1870

Other legislation
- Relates to: Curragh of Kildare Act 1868

Status: Current legislation

Text of statute as originally enacted

The earliest mention of the Curragh in legal documents was 1299, when an act was passed, to prevent swine from feeding on the Curragh plains to the detriment of the sward.

In 1865 Parliament set up a commission to examine the Curragh. The findings of this led to the enactment of the Curragh of Kildare Act 1868 (31 & 32 Vict. c. 60). This created the honorary position of a Ranger tasked with the care, management and preservation of the Curragh for the purpose of horseracing and training of horses.

The 1868 act also provided for a second commission to report on the use of the Curragh for common pasture. This report is detailed in the Curragh of Kildare Act 1870 (33 & 34 Vict. c. 74). This act specifies sheep grazing rights for the Curragh.

On the establishment of the Irish Free State in 1922, the lands of the Curragh passed from the Crown to the Minister for Finance of the Irish State.

The Curragh of Kildare Act 1961 repealed the 1868 Act and sections of the 1870 Act. It also abolished the office of the Ranger and transferred its duties to the Department of Defence.

== Military ==
There has been a permanent military presence in the Curragh since 1856. The Curragh Camp is now home to the Defence Forces Training Centre of the Irish Defence Forces. Curragh Military Museum opened in 2010.

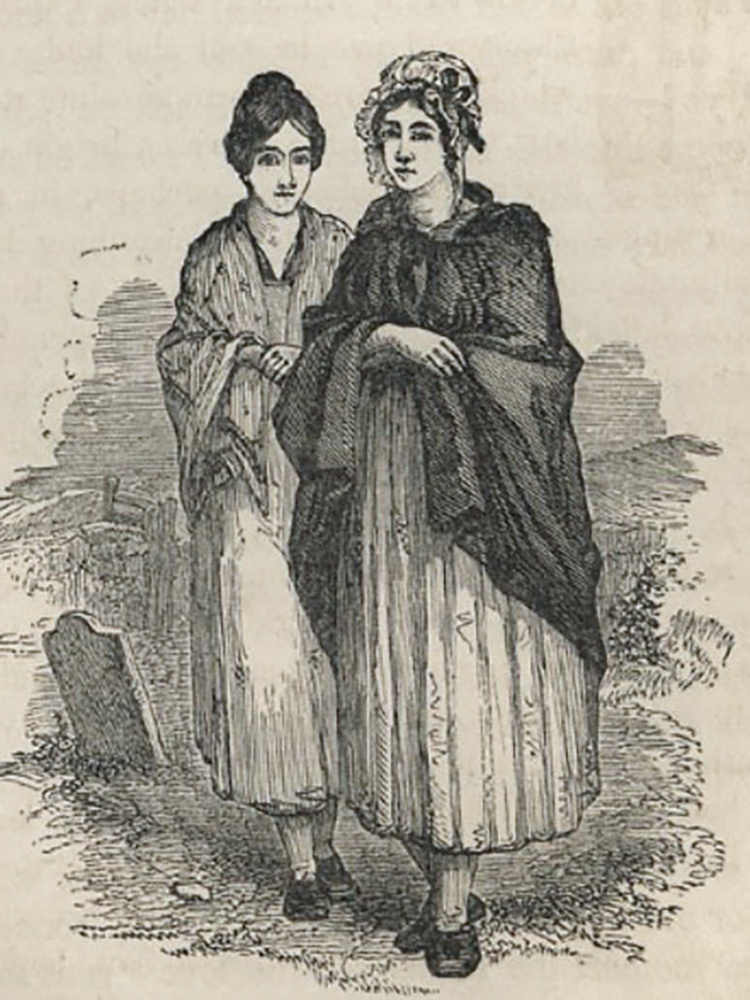
Two anonymous Wrens of the Curragh

Records of women, known as Wrens of the Curragh, who were paid for prostitution and other services (such as clothes-washing, mending, alcohol) by soldiers at the camp, go back to the 1840s. Up to 60 women lived in 'nests' half-hollowed out of banks and ditches, which were covered in furze bushes. Whilst many women were sex workers, others had common-law marriages to soldiers but were barred from living within the camp itself. The women's presence is not reported after the 1880s.

== Sport ==
=== Horse racing ===
The Curragh Racecourse on the plain is Ireland's Premier Flat Racecourse. Every year, it hosts all five classic races in the racing calendar: the Irish Derby Stakes, the Irish Oaks, the Irish 1,000 Guineas, the Irish 2,000 Guineas and the Irish St. Leger.

=== Motor racing ===
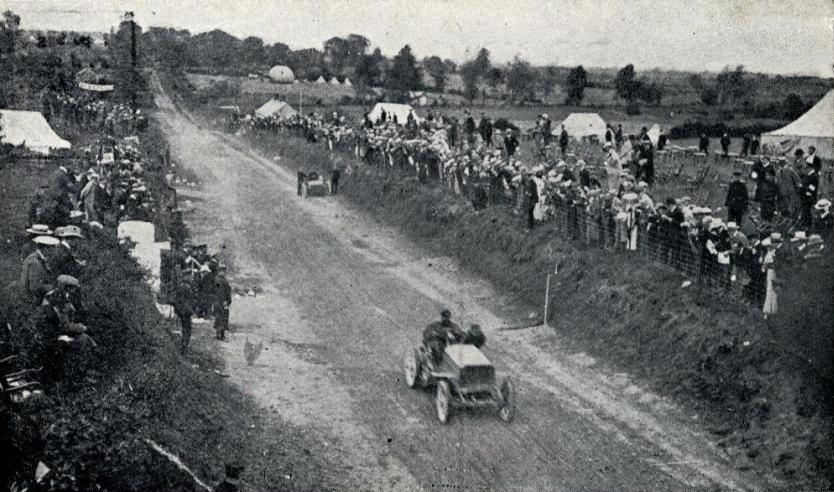
1903 Gordon Bennett Trophy. René de Knyff, driving his Panhard to second place, passes Alexander Winton repairing the Winton Bullet 2 on the first lap.

On 2 July 1903, the Gordon Bennett Cup ran through the Curragh. It was the first international motor race to be held in what was then the United Kingdom of Great Britain and Ireland. The Automobile Club of Great Britain and Ireland wanted the race to be hosted in the United Kingdom (as it existed then), and Ireland was suggested as the venue because racing was illegal on British public roads. Following a lobbying campaign, local laws were adjusted, and Kildare was chosen on the basis of the straightness of its roads. As a compliment to Ireland, the British team chose to race in Shamrock green (Note: According to Leinster Leader, 11 April 1903, Britain had to choose a different colour to its usual national colours of red, white and blue, as these had already been taken by Italy, Germany and France respectively. It also stated red as the colour for American cars in the 1903 Gordon Bennett Cup.) which later became known as British racing green. The route consisted of several loops of a circuit that passed-through Kilcullen, the Curragh, Kildare, Monasterevin, Stradbally, Castledermot, Carlow, and Athy. The 528 km (328 mi) race was won by the Belgian racer Camille Jenatzy, driving a Mercedes.

After The Emergency both motor cars and motorcycle racing took place on occasions drawing crowds up to 30,000. For eight years from 1947 until 1954 cars competed, while motorcycle racing continued until 1967. The first race was run by the Leinster Motor Club on 12 July 1947 over a 2.69 km (1.67 mi) course known as the "Short circuit" but eight years later the death of Don Beauman at a different Irish venue plus other fatal racing accidents in 1955 brought an end to motor car racing at the Curragh. The 1951 Wakefield Trophy was won by the then 22-year-old Stirling Moss.

== Education ==
The Curragh Camp has one primary school which is a mixed school called St Catherine of Sienna. Also within the Curragh Camp is a secondary school known as Curragh Community College. This secondary school, founded in 1933 as Curragh Post Primary School, is situated beside the parade ground. As of November 2024, it was proposed to move the school to a new building in Kildare town.

Other primary schools in the Curragh area include Newbridge Educate Together (a national school under the patronage of Educate Together) and Gaelscoil Chill Dara (an Irish medium school or gaelscoil). Gaelscoil Chill Dara, which was founded in 1995, was originally based in Herbert Lodge on the Curragh and later moved to a larger purpose-built premises at Curragh Grange. It is under the patronage of An Foras Pátrúnachta. The school, which was oversubscribed for a number of years, takes many of its pupils from the surrounding towns of Newbridge, Kildare Town, Naas, Kilcullen and Rathangan. Gaelscoil Chill Dara had an enrollment of 312 as of August 2024.

== Cultural references ==
- The Curragh plains were used to film the battle scenes in the film Braveheart.
- An Irish folk song is called The Curragh of Kildare.
- The 2020 film Dating Amber was filmed and set in the Curragh.

== See also ==
- Curragh incident
