= The Japanese Garden at Tully =

Garden in Tully, County Kildare, Ireland

Coordinates: 53°08′40″N 6°54′07″W

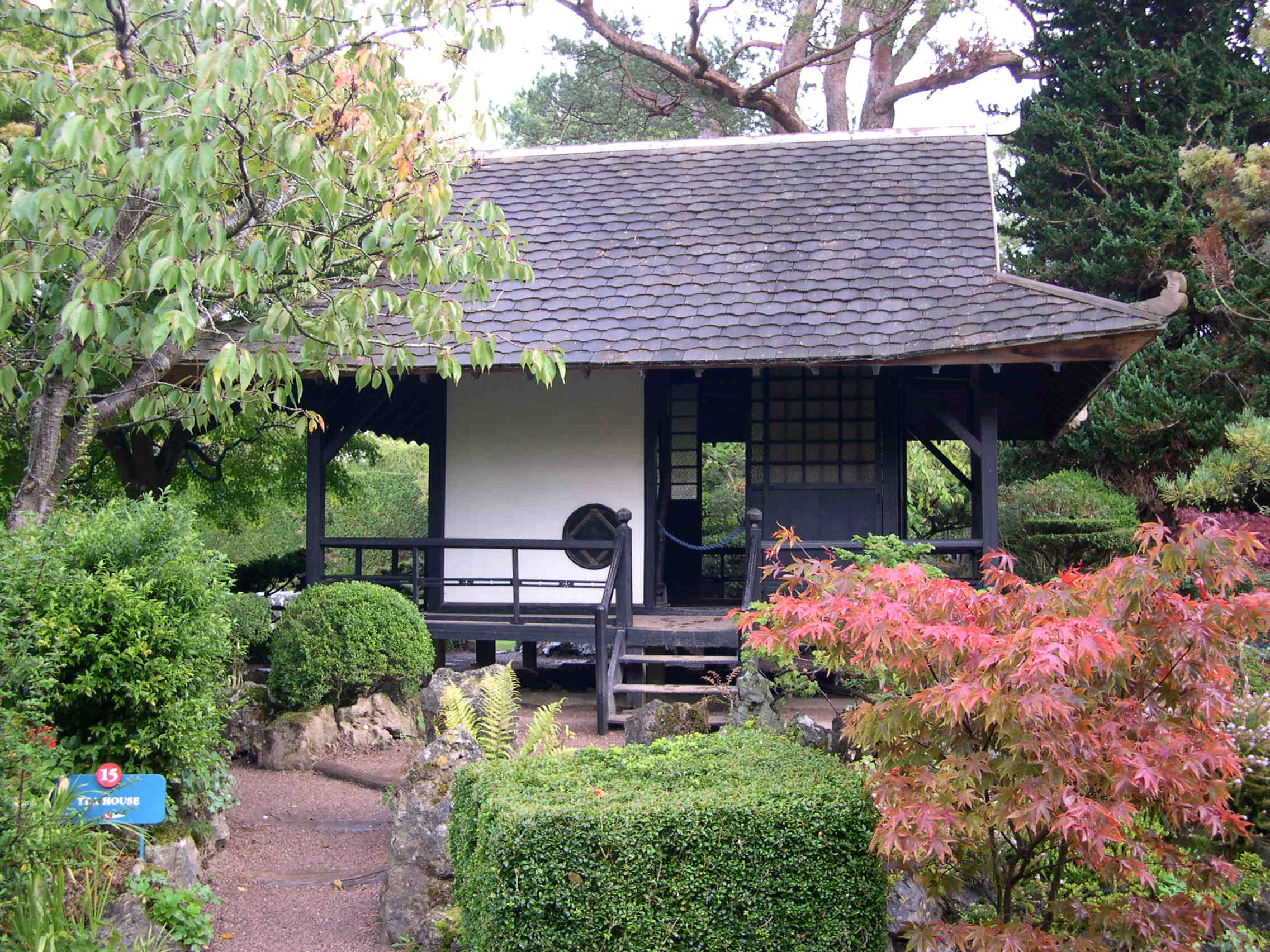
Tea_House

The Japanese Garden at Tully in County Kildare, Ireland, was created between 1906 and 1910 in the grounds of what later became the Irish National Stud.

== History ==
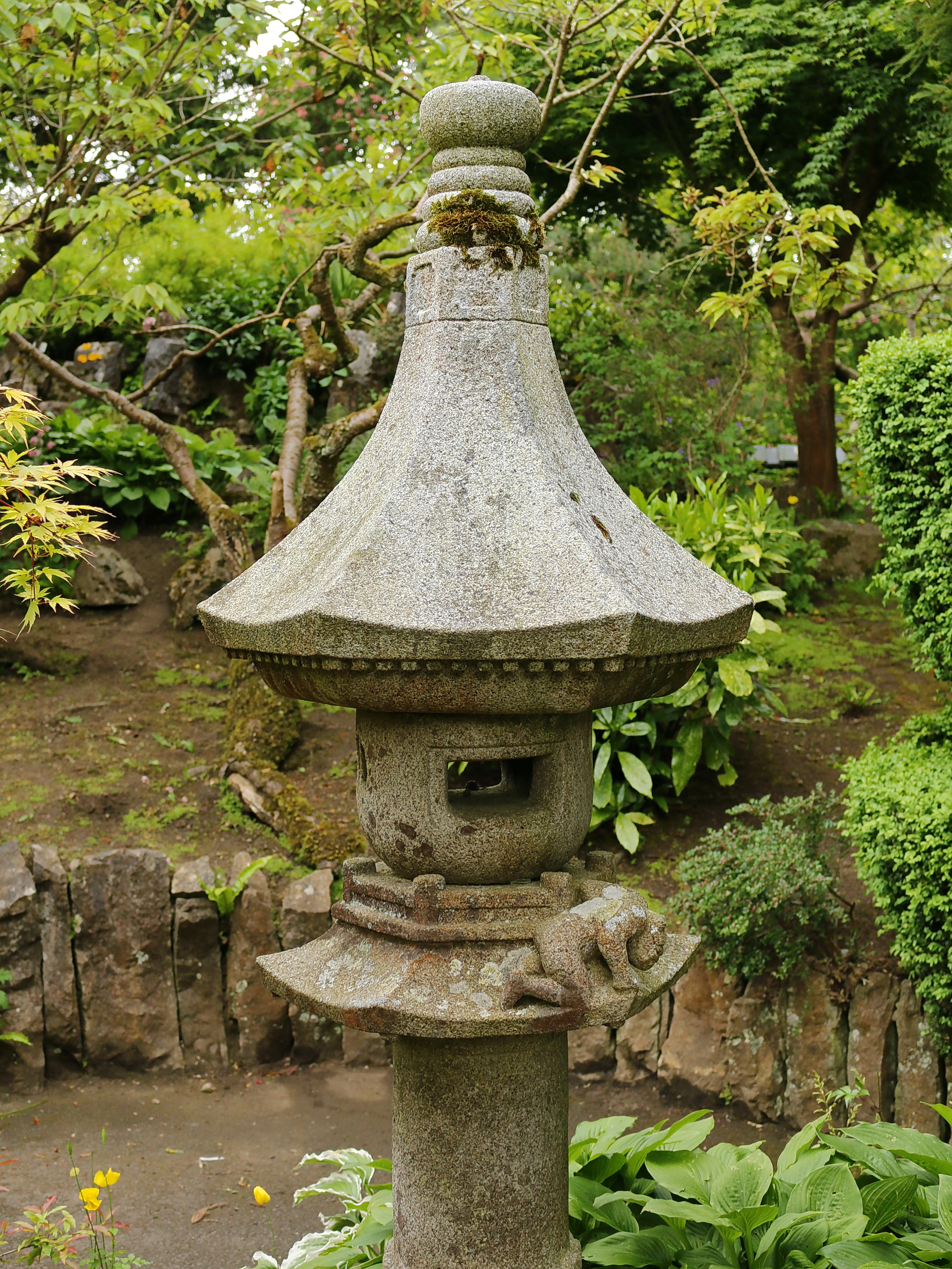

In 1900 a wealthy British brewer and racehorse owner, William Walker. bought an estate at Tully in County Kildare and established a stud. He saw the potential for a Japanese Garden in a boggy piece of ground on the farm. There had been interest in Japanese gardens in Britain since the 1850s and many people incorporated traditional features of Japanese gardens, such as bridges, into their gardens.

Walker commissioned Tassa Eida from Japan to design and create the garden. Eida was assisted in the project by his son Minoru. The garden took forty labourers four years (from 1906 to 1910) to complete. Scots pines and hundreds of tons of rocks were brought into Tully from elsewhere in Ireland, while Japanese elements such as a tea-house, bridge, statues and a miniature Japanese village were imported from Japan.

In 1916, Walker sold the Tully estate to the British government, and the garden underwent a period of neglect until the property was acquire by the Irish government and became the Irish National Stud in 1945. Paddy Doyle from the National Botanic Gardens was appointed to oversee the garden's restoration in 1946. He was succeeded by John Colleran in 1973 and since then the garden has always been under the management of a horticulturist.

In the cold winter of 2010 the ‘’Thuja plicata’’ hedge which marked the interior boundary of the garden was destroyed and had to be replaced with a wall.

== Design ==
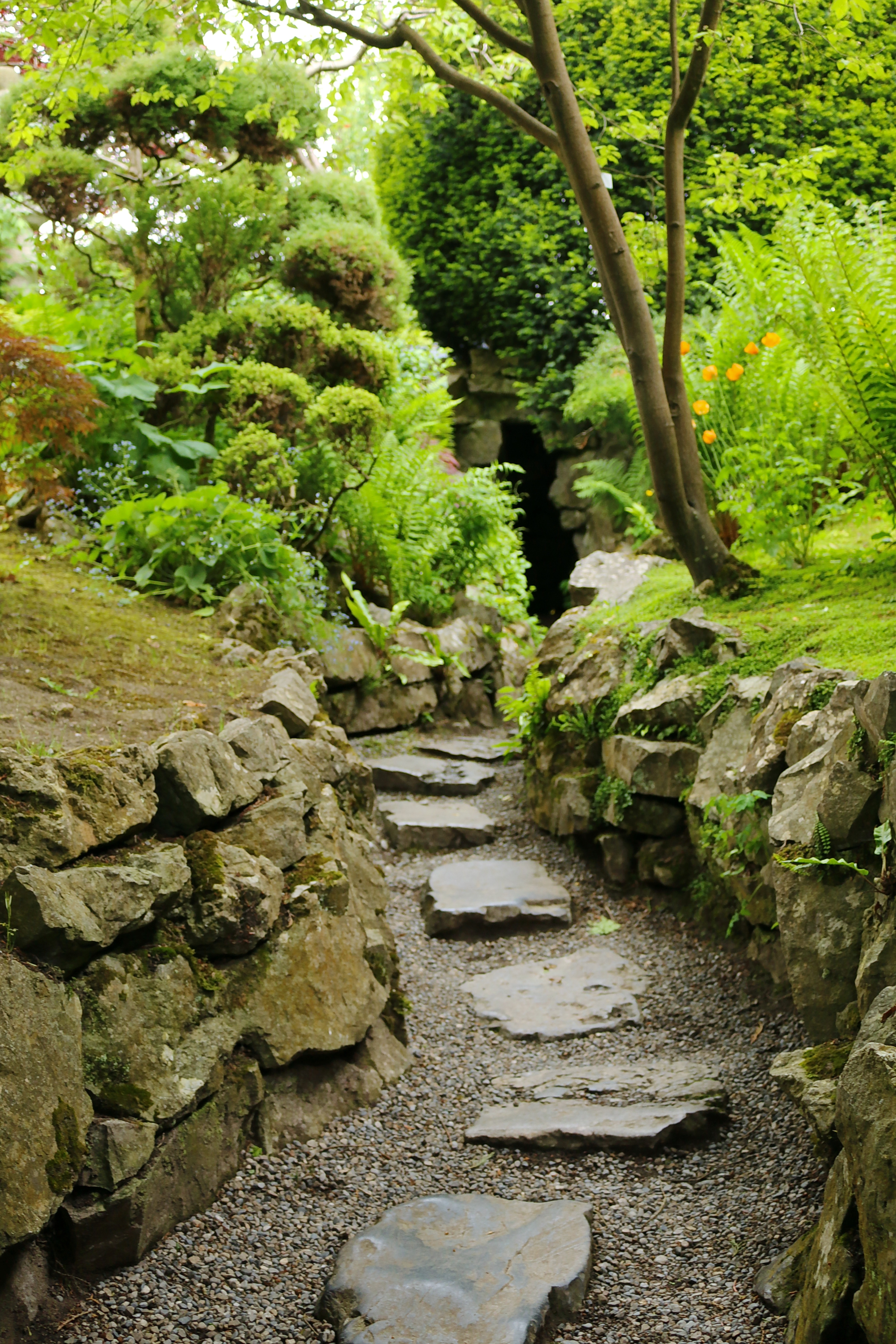

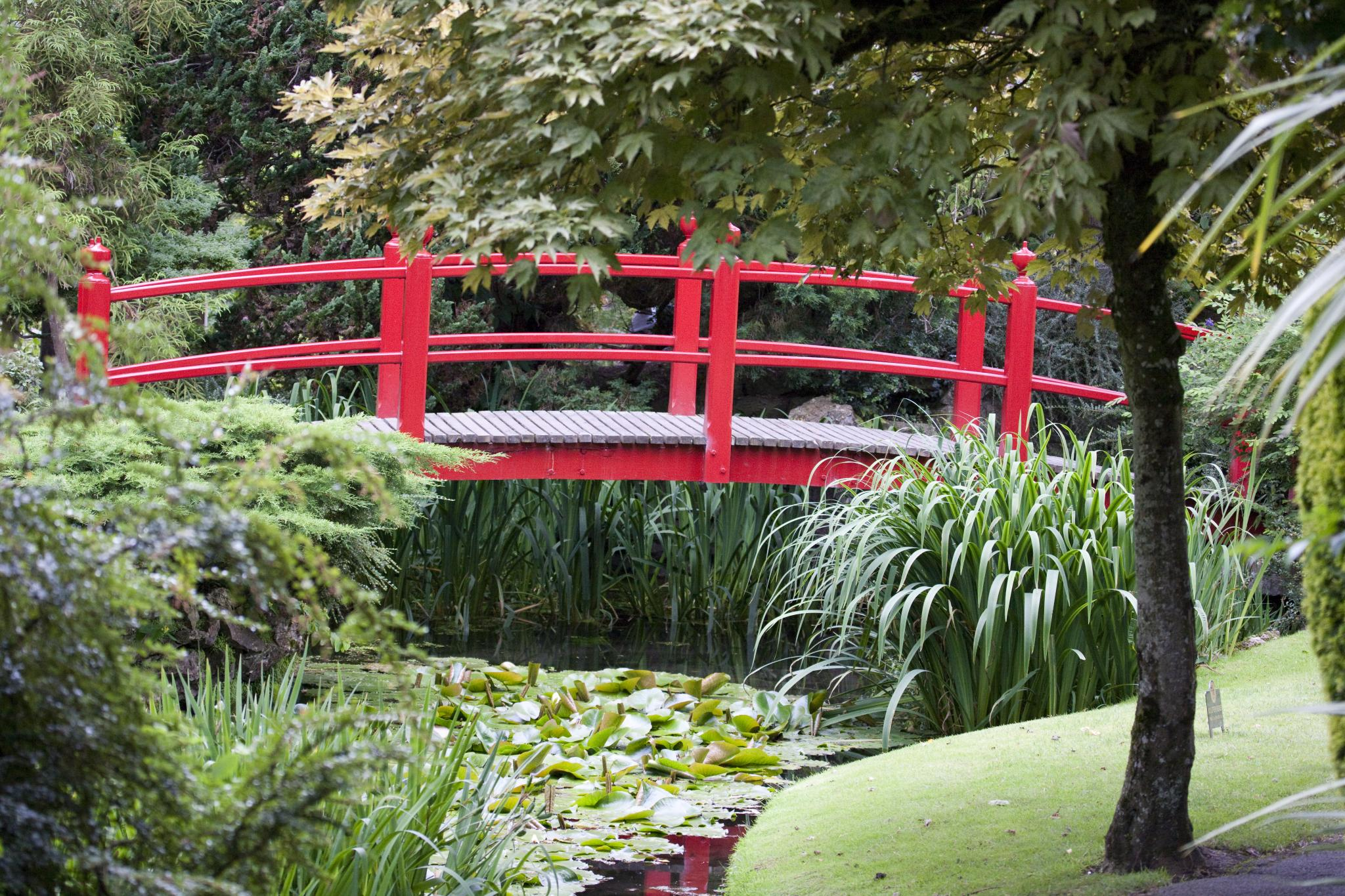

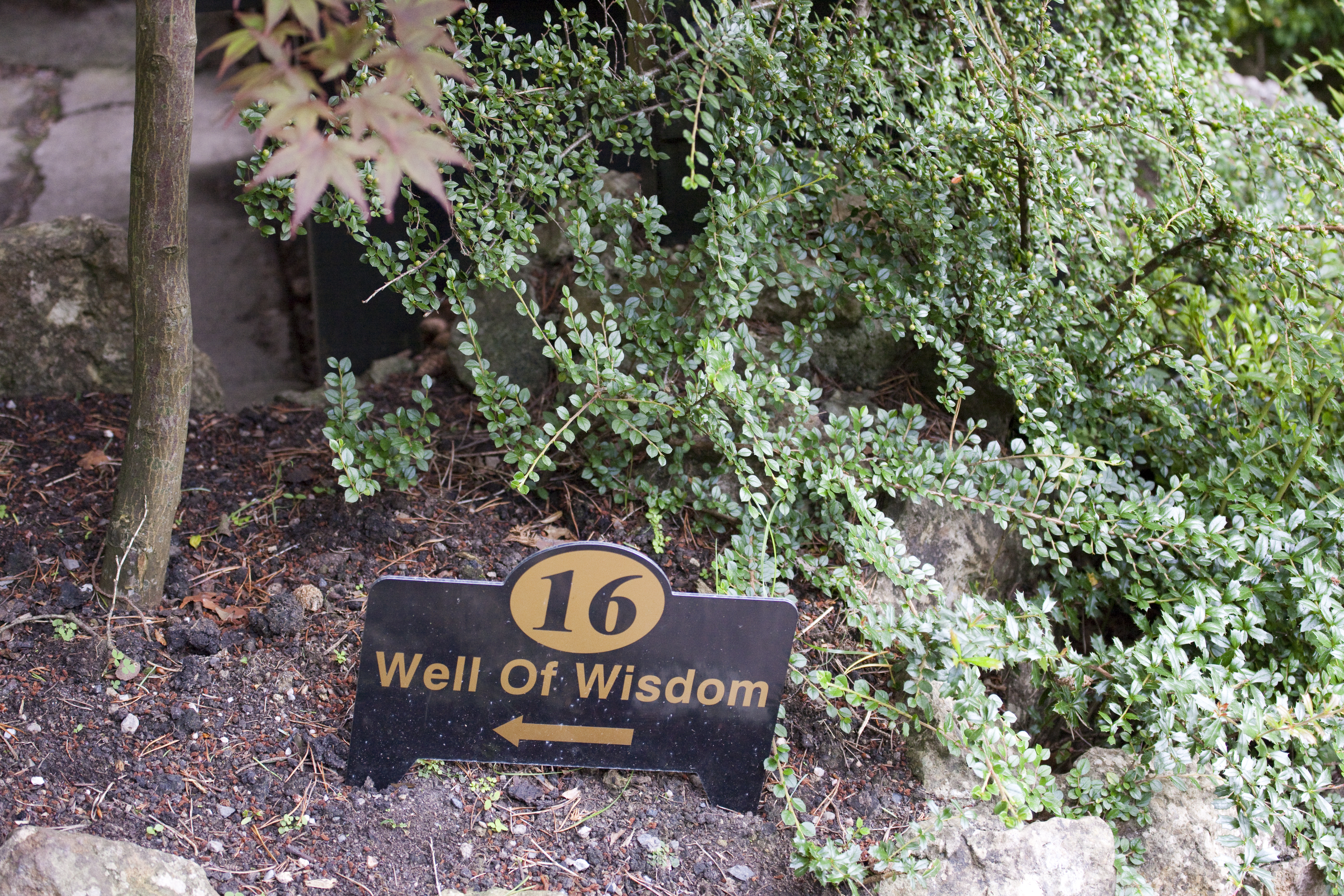

The garden was designed to represent the journey through life. A brochure published by the Irish National Stud in the 1950s explained the garden's symbolism. After describing a short path symbolising childhood which leads to a mound of rock, the brochure continues:

"Through this the tunnelled pathway leads from the darkness into the light from ignorance to the unfolding knowledge. Half way through the winding is an opening leading to steps to the hill of learning crowded by an ancient fir tree. Often this fir crowned height tempts the student to look too high but there is an unguarded hole to teach him vigilance before he comes down the hill to the level of his fellows. Following the winding course still guarded by rocks he reaches the parting of the ways. On the right ambition on the left is the straight path of austere living in the centre is the path to wedded life by which the pilgrim reaches the tiny island of joy and wonder, across the stepping stones of exploration. But he cannot stay there. All paths lead to further temptation across a stone bridge to the bamboo bridge and the geisha house but beyond them is the hill of ambition and the well of wisdom is in sight across the beautiful water. Very steep is the hill and those who climb may be separated but as they climb they reach out a helping hands and are united at the top. Descending the pilgrim finds an easy bridge across the roaring falls and treads the stepping stones through the level garden of peace and contentment to the hill of mourning where his soul goes forth through the gate of eternity."

The garden is planted with trees including fir trees, cherry trees, flowering almond and plum trees, and flowers including azaleas, camellias, Japanese anemones and Tibetan poppies. Eida also constructed two artificial lakes. The upper lake is planted with dogweed and willows, while the lower one has a rustic swan-house.
