= Federica De Bortoli =

Italian voice actress

- Born: November 9, 1976 (age 49); Rome, Italy
- Occupation: Voice actress
- Years active: 1984–present
- Relatives: Barbara De Bortoli (sister)

Federica De Bortoli (born November 9, 1976) is an Italian voice actress.

== Biography ==
Following on the path of her elder sister, Barbara De Bortoli, she entered a career in acting and dubbing as a child. Federica De Bortoli contributes to voicing characters in movies, cartoons, and anime. Among the actresses she regularly dubs includes Rachel McAdams, Natalie Portman, Isla Fisher and Kristen Stewart. She provides the voices of characters such as Darcy in the animated series Winx Club. She is also known for providing the voice of the character Bella Swan in the Italian-language version of the Twilight film series.

She works at LaBibi.it, Dubbing Brothers, Sefit - CDC and other dubbing studios in Italy.

== Filmography ==
- Benedetta & Company - TV series (1982)
- Un foro nel parabrezza (1983)

== Voice work ==
=== Animation ===
- Darcy in Winx Club, Winx Club: The Secret of the Lost Kingdom, Winx Club 3D: Magical Adventure, Winx Club: The Mystery of the Abyss
- Tilda in Farhat - Il principe del deserto
- Ima in I Roteò e la magia dello specchio

==== Dubbing ====
- Kyoko Tokiwa in Full Metal Panic!, Full Metal Panic? Fumoffu, Full Metal Panic!: The Second Raid
- Padmé Amidala in Star Wars: Clone Wars (2003 TV series), Star Wars: The Clone Wars (film), Star Wars: The Clone Wars (2008 TV series)
- Silvermist in Tinker Bell, Tinker Bell and the Lost Treasure, Tinker Bell and the Great Fairy Rescue
- Rapunzel in Sofia The First, Rapunzel's Tangled Adventure, Ralph Breaks the Internet
- Ducky in The Land Before Time, The Land Before Time II: The Great Valley Adventure
- Kagome Higurashi in InuYasha (season 1), Inuyasha: The Final Act
- Sage and Ginger in Blue's Clues
- Tails in Sonic X
- Lexi Bunny in Loonatics Unleashed
- Agura Idaben in Hot Wheels Battle Force 5
- Saturn Girl in Legion of Super Heroes
- Suki in Avatar: The Last Airbender
- Lu in Mike, Lu & Og
- Harue Kudou in Gals!
- Nene Romanova in Bubblegum Crisis
- Ginger Foutley in As Told by Ginger
- Kurumi Kasuga in Kimagure Orange Road
- Tomoko Saeki in DNA²
- Fuuka Tanigawa in Dai-Guard
- Roberta Tubbs in The Cleveland Show
- Lina Inverse in Slayers (2nd dub)
- Midori Fujiyama (Second voice) in Gaiking
- Miho in Saint Seiya: The Movie (2nd dub)
- Karen Tehama in Fillmore!
- Hahli in Bionicle: Mask of Light
- Candy in Dave the Barbarian
- Nana Komatsu in Nana
- Kestrel (2nd voice) in The Animals of Farthing Wood
- Junko Miyaji in FLCL
- Miaka Yūki in Fushigi Yûgi
- Matilda in LeapFrog
- Molly Baker in Sailor Moon (Viz Media redub)
- Lal'C Mellk Mal in Diebuster
- Sailor Moon in Sailor Moon R: The Movie
- Portia in Friends and Heroes
- Yukari in Saikano
- Mune-Mune in Magical Shopping Arcade Abenobashi
- Priscilla in Gunslinger Girl
- Jelly Otter in PB&J Otter
- Yukino Miyazawa in Kare Kano
- Cheza in Wolf's Rain
- Betty Brant in The Spectacular Spider-Man
- Lirin in Saiyuki
- Masami in Generator Gawl
- Alielle Relryle in El-Hazard
- Felicia in Night Warriors: Darkstalkers' Revenge
- Diana in Pokémon 4Ever
- Margaret Tim in Dinosaur Island
- Olivia Flaversham in The Great Mouse Detective
- Sarah Whitney in Horseland
- Hikari Horaki in Neon Genesis Evangelion
- Urara Kasuga in Sakura Diaries
- Mei Mer in KO Beast
- Alice Smashenburn in Game Over (TV series)
- T-Ai in Transformers: Robots in Disguise
- Yuko Miyabe in Strange Dawn
- Arisu Mizuki Serial Experiments Lain
- Flapper in Dink, the Little Dinosaur
- Kilowatt in Space Chimps
- Stacey in A Goofy Movie
- Little Lulu in The Little Lulu Show
- Cynthia Brisby in The Secret of NIMH
- Tsujiwaki Miki in Hungry Heart: Wild Striker
- Aika Sumeragi in Agent Aika
- Himeno Awayuki in Prétear
- Yukari Uchida in The Vision of Escaflowne
- Pai Chan in Virtua Fighter
- Excel in Excel Saga
- Paprika in Paprika
- Sae Sawanoguchi in Magic User's Club
- Cleao Everlasting in Sorcerous Stabber Orphen
- Potato Chip in Popples
- Yurika Misumaru in Martian Successor Nadesico
- Nurse Jenny in ChalkZone

=== Live-action ===
==== Dubbing ====
- Rachel McAdams in Mean Girls, Red Eye, The Family Stone, The Lucky Ones, State of Play, The Time Traveler's Wife, Sherlock Holmes, Morning Glory, Sherlock Holmes: A Game of Shadows, The Vow, To the Wonder, About Time, A Most Wanted Man, True Detective, Aloha, Southpaw, Every Thing Will Be Fine, Spotlight, Disobedience
- Natalie Portman in Heat, Star Wars: Episode I – The Phantom Menace, Star Wars: Episode II – Attack of the Clones, Garden State, Star Wars: Episode III – Revenge of the Sith, Hotel Chevalier, The Other Woman, Black Swan, Hesher, Your Highness, Knight of Cups, Jackie, Song to Song, Annihilation, Vox Lux, The Death & Life of John F. Donovan, A Tale of Love and Darkness
- Isla Fisher in Swimming Pool, Wedding Crashers, The Lookout, Hot Rod, Definitely Maybe, Confessions of a Shopaholic, Burke & Hare, Bachelorette, Now You See Me, Life of Crime, Grimsby, Keeping Up with the Joneses, Tag
- Kristen Stewart in The Cake Eaters, Twilight, Adventureland, The Twilight Saga: New Moon, The Twilight Saga: Eclipse, The Twilight Saga: Breaking Dawn – Part 1, Snow White and the Huntsman, On the Road, The Twilight Saga: Breaking Dawn – Part 2, Sils Maria, Still Alice, American Ultra, Equals, Personal Shopper, Happiest Season
- Anne Hathaway in The Princess Diaries 2: Royal Engagement, Alice in Wonderland, Love & Other Drugs, Les Misérables, Alice Through the Looking Glass, The Hustle, The Last Thing He Wanted, Modern Love
- Kirsten Dunst in Interview with the Vampire, All I Wanna Do, The Virgin Suicides, The Crow: Salvation, Bring It On, Get Over It, The Cat's Meow, Mona Lisa Smile, Eternal Sunshine of the Spotless Mind
- Noomi Rapace in The Girl with the Dragon Tattoo, The Girl Who Played with Fire, The Girl Who Kicked the Hornets' Nest, Beyond, The Monitor, Dead Man Down, Stockholm
- Bryce Dallas Howard in Lady in the Water, The Loss of a Teardrop Diamond, Jurassic World, Jurassic World: Fallen Kingdom, Rocketman
- Cobie Smulders in The Avengers, Captain America: The Winter Soldier, Avengers: Age of Ultron, Jack Reacher, Avengers: Infinity War, Spider-Man: Far From Home, Tru Calling, Agents of S.H.I.E.L.D., Stumptown
- Keira Knightley in Star Wars: Episode I – The Phantom Menace, A Dangerous Method, The Nutcracker and the Four Realms, Official Secrets
- Reese Witherspoon in Pleasantville, Election, This Means War, Wild, Inherent Vice, Hot Pursuit
- Gemma Arterton in The Disappearance of Alice Creed, Prince of Persia: The Sands of Time, Song for Marion, Gemma Bovery, Their Finest
- Tara Reid in American Pie, Just Visiting, American Pie 2, Devil's Pond, American Reunion
- Abbie Cornish in A Good Year, W.E., Seven Psychopaths, Premonition, Where Hands Touch
- Amy Adams in The Wedding Date, The Fighter, Her
- Emilie de Ravin in Santa's Slay, Lost, The Hills Have Eyes, Remember Me
- Mélanie Laurent in Paris, Inglourious Basterds, Le Concert
- Greta Gerwig in Greenberg, To Rome with Love, Frances Ha
- Evan Rachel Wood in Little Secrets
