= List of Winx Club characters =

List of characters of a television series

The main fairies in their Believix transformation 3D designs, clockwise from top right: Tecna, Flora, Stella, Bloom, Aisha, and Musa.

Winx Club is an animated series co-produced by Rainbow SpA and later Nickelodeon. Its characters were created and designed by comic artist Iginio Straffi. The show takes place in a magical dimension where a group of fairy warriors defends their universe from villains. The group, named the Winx Club, attends the Alfea College for Fairies.

The Winx Club is led by Bloom, a girl from Earth who thought she was an average human until discovering to be the Fairy of the Dragon Flame. The original group includes Stella, the Fairy of the Sun and Moon and (in later seasons) Fairy of the Shining Sun; Musa, the Fairy of Music; Tecna, the Fairy of Technology; and Flora, the Fairy of Nature. They share an apartment on the campus of Alfea. The Fairy of Waves, Aisha, is introduced in the second season and becomes the sixth member of the group, while The Fairy of Animals, Roxy, is introduced in the fourth season as the seventh member (occasionally).

The characters of Winx Club have become popular with audiences. Critical response to the characters has been positive, with praise for their positive relationships and presentation of gender roles. The characters have appeared in a variety of media, including the spin-off series World of Winx, a comic book serial, and video games. In 2012, new episodes of the series incorporated CGI-animated sequences that rendered the characters in 3D. A live-action series inspired by Winx Club, Fate: The Winx Saga, debuted in 2021 and features some of the original characters.

In the original series (seasons 1–4), the characters' mouths were animated to match the Italian voice actors, who recorded their lines in Rome. The revived series, beginning with the hour-long specials, was produced in English first. The specials and seasons 5–6 were animated to match the Hollywood-based cast, who recorded their lines at the Atlas Oceanic studio. Season 7 was also matched to Nickelodeon and Rainbow's English scripts, but due to budget cuts, Viacom relocated the voice cast from Hollywood to New York City.

== Creation and production history ==
Iginio Straffi developed the Winx Club characters for the short pilot episode "Magic Bloom," which was finished in 2001. The characters' outfits were modeled on those of traditional European fairies, while their appearances were loosely inspired by popular celebrities of the time. In a 2011 interview with IO Donna, Straffi stated Britney Spears served as an inspiration for Bloom, Cameron Diaz for Stella, Jennifer Lopez for Flora, Pink for Tecna, and Lucy Liu for Musa. Straffi wanted the fairies to represent "the women of today" and to look more modern than classic examples like the Blue Fairy.

After holding test screenings of the pilot, Straffi was unhappy with the audience's unenthusiastic reaction to the characters' outdated clothing style. He hired Italian fashion designers to give the characters a more modern appearance. Flora underwent several changes because Straffi felt test audiences disliked her design. She was originally drawn with glasses and a lighter skin tone; for the full series, her glasses were removed and she was given darker skin to look "more Latin". The Winx fairies' male counterparts, the Specialists, were created in response to a request that the series should feature male leads.

According to Iginio Straffi, each of the Winx fairies' personalities were made as different as possible so "teenagers from all over the world can identify themselves with the character they think they are most like". After the premiere of the first season worldwide, the production team heard that American viewers noticed the absence of Black characters in the show. In response, Straffi designed a sixth fairy named Aisha, who has darker skin than the others. Her design was loosely inspired by Beyoncé and she was introduced in the first episode of the second season. The fourth season introduces a seventh member, Roxy, who occasionally joins the other fairies.

After Viacom became a co-owner of the Rainbow studio in 2011, new seasons of Winx Club entered production at Viacom's Nickelodeon Animation Studio and Rainbow. For this relaunched series (which began with four specials that retell Bloom's origin story), Viacom hired popular actors to voice many of the characters. These stars included Ariana Grande as Diaspro, Elizabeth Gillies as Daphne, Keke Palmer as Aisha, Matt Shively as Sky, and Daniella Monet as Mitzi.

== The Winx Fairies ==
- Bloom is the Fairy of the Dragon Flame and the lost princess of Domino. She has fire and heat-based powers. Bloom is the most powerful fairy and the leader of the Winx Club. She has long red-orange hair with bangs and blue eyes. Before discovering her magical powers, she lived on Earth as an ordinary human, unaware of her birth on the planet Domino and believing her birth parents are dead. Throughout the first movie, Bloom uncovers the mystery behind her home planet's destruction at the hands of the Ancestral Witches, culminating in a battle against them. Bloom dates Sky throughout the series and accepts his marriage proposal in Winx Club 3D: Magical Adventure. Bloom's Italian voice actress is Letizia Ciampa and her Nickelodeon/Hollywood voice actress is Molly Quinn.
- Stella is the outgoing and spontaneous Fairy of the Shining Sun (Fairy of the Sun and Moon). She is the Crown Princess of Solaria. She has long blonde hair and golden brown eyes, and her powers involve manipulating light and using energy from the sun and moon. She is a skilled artist and keeps a sketchbook of fashion drawings. Throughout the series, Stella creates her own outfits for the group to follow her dreams of becoming a fashion designer. Stella is Bloom's best friend and she enjoys being the center of attention. Although she can be quite selfish sometimes, Stella nonetheless adores her friends and family. She is the oldest of the Winx, as she was held back at Alfea for a year. She is engaged to Sky's bodyguard, Brandon, whom she tends to obsess over. Stella's Italian voice actress is Perla Liberatori and her Nickelodeon/Hollywood voice actress is Amy Gross.
- Musa is the brave and tomboyish Fairy of Music from the planet Melody. She has dark blue eyes, and blue-black hair that is worn in short pigtails in the first two seasons and in a longer hairstyle afterwards. Her powers involve manipulating sound waves and music. She loves music, playing instruments (especially the concert flute), dancing and singing. Musa is observant, sensitive and loyal. She can be pessimistic and sarcastic at times. She is also the most outspoken of the group. Musa is from a poor family, and her mother died when she was a little girl because they couldn't afford medicine. She dreams of becoming a singer like her mother. In the second season, Musa and Layla become best friends. Musa goes through multiple breakups with her boyfriend Riven, including one in season six that carries on through the seventh season, before the two got back together in the eighth season. Musa's Italian voice actress is Gemma Donati and her Nickelodeon/Hollywood voice actress is Romi Dames.
- Aisha is the confident and athletic Fairy of Waves (Fluids or Morphix) and the Crown Princess of Andros, introduced in the second season. Aisha joins the Winx after the other fairies rescue her from Lord Darkar. She is from the planet Andros, a realm of oceans. She has dark skin, curly dark-brown hair, and blue eyes. Aisha is able to control and manipulate a pink fluid called Morphix. She is proud and determined, with a passion for sports and dance. She had a romantic relationship with Nabu, but after his death in the fourth season, she gets together with Nex. In some third-party dubs, Aisha's name is changed to Layla, including the 4Kids and Cinélume dubs. Aisha's Italian voice actress is Laura Lenghi and her Nickelodeon/Hollywood voice actress is Keke Palmer.
- Tecna is the rational Fairy of Technology. She has light skin, short pink hair (usually worn in a bob cut), and blue-green eyes. She is from the planet Zenith and draws her magical abilities from machinery and energy. Tecna has a photographic memory and a knowledge of science, helping her invent devices to help herself and her friends. Tecna enjoys experimenting with computer programs and playing video games. She is orderly and very smart, using logic to solve problems. Tecna dates Timmy throughout the series. Tecna's Italian voice actress is Domitilla D'Amico and her Nickelodeon/Hollywood voice actress is Morgan Decker.
- Flora is the sensitive and shy Fairy of Nature from the planet Lynphea. She has long, brunette hair with blonde bangs, green eyes and tan skin. Flora draws her strength from plants and her room at Alfea resembles a greenhouse. She is the Winx Club's peacemaker, believing in protecting others and the environment. Flora is the group's potions expert who brews herbal remedies. Flora begins dating Helia in Season 2. Flora's Italian voice actress is Ilaria Latini and her Nickelodeon/Hollywood voice actress is Alejandra Reynoso.
- Roxy is the rebellious Fairy of Animals, introduced in the fourth season. She has straight pinkish-purple hair with gold streaks and purple eyes. Roxy is stubborn and a little shy, and she cares deeply for animals. When she first met the Winx, Roxy was angry and yelled at them to leave her alone. She did not want to be a fairy, but over time, she started to embrace her animal powers. Roxy's Italian voice actress is Debora Magnaghi and her Nickelodeon/Hollywood voice actress is Liliana Mumy. While Roxy appears less frequently than the others, she is officially labeled the seventh member of the Winx.

== The Specialists ==
The Specialists are male warriors who train at the Red Fountain school:

- Sky is the leader of the Specialists. He is the crown prince of the planet Eraklyon. He has fair skin, blue eyes, and blond hair. He and Bloom date throughout the series; Sky later proposes to her in Magical Adventure. Sky is the son of King Erendor and Queen Samara, who initially pair him with a princess named Diaspro. Sky breaks up with Diaspro after learning about her selfish demeanor. He is best friends with his bodyguard Brandon. Sky's Italian voice actor is and his Nickelodeon/Hollywood voice actor is Matt Shively.
- Brandon is Sky's best friend and bodyguard, and Stella's boyfriend. He is the strongest of the Specialists and the most outgoing of the boys. He has fair skin, short brown hair with a long fringe, and brown eyes. He is voiced by Nanni Baldini, and Gianluca Crisafi in Italian. His Nickelodeon/Hollywood voice actor is Adam Gregory.
- Riven is the competitive and stubborn maverick of the Specialists. He has light skin, short, spiky dark magenta hair and blue-violet eyes. His mom abandoned him at birth and he is wary of women. He has an intermittent relationship with Musa; they break up in the sixth season, and this carries over through the seventh season, before the two got back together in the eighth season. Riven's weapons of choice are a red-purple phantosaber and a meteor hammer. His Italian voice actor is and his Nickelodeon/Hollywood voice actor is Sam Riegel.
- Timmy is a Specialist who comes from a family of respected scientists in Magix. He loves technology and is skilled at commandeering ships from Red Fountain. He is the least-skilled of the Specialists in terms of combat but is an expert with machines. He wears glasses, and has fair skin and light brown-orange hair with a small fringe. His girlfriend is Tecna; his shyness interferes with him telling Tecna about his feelings for her. Timmy's Italian voice actor is Corrado Conforti and his Nickelodeon/Hollywood voice actor is Charlie Schlatter.
- Helia, who is introduced in the second season, is an artistic Specialist and the nephew of Red Fountain's headmaster Saladin. Helia is a pacifist who cares about nature and his friends. He is Flora's boyfriend and is very romantic. He likes to paint pictures and write poetry for her. In the first two seasons, he has long, blue-black hair tied into a loose ponytail and from season four his hair is short with a spiky fringe. His weapon of choice is a laser string glove. Helia's Italian voice actors are Francesco Pezzulli and Leonardo Graziano, and his Nickelodeon/Hollywood voice actor is David Faustino.
- Nabu is a Mage of nobile origins who was born on the planet of Andros. He is introduced in the third season when Aisha finds she is arranged to marry him. Using the pseudonym Ophir, Nabu secretly leaves Andros to find out what Aisha is like. The Winx and the Specialists believe he is a spy of Valtor, but after he saves them on multiple occasions, Nabu gains their respect and Aisha's love. His weapon is a magic staff and he has light-brown skin, braided red-brown hair, and violet eyes. Near the end of the fourth season, shortly after asked Aisha to marry him, Nabu dies when he sacrifices himself to save the Earth fairy kingdom of Tír nan Óg. His Italian voice actor is and his Nickelodeon/Hollywood voice actor is Will Blagrove.
- Roy is a Specialist from Andros who works for Aisha's father and sent by him to help the Winx in their mission (5th season). Roy has light-brown skin, spiky blond hair, and gray eyes. He is a polite and respectful boy, a great sportsman and specialized in aquatic combat. Like Nabu, Roy uses magic and has a crush on Aisha, who is slow to reciprocate his feelings but befriends him by the sixth season. Roy's rival for Aisha's affection is the Paladin Nex. Roy's Italian voice actor is and his English voice actor is Bryton James.

The Paladins were introduced in Season 6:

- Thoren is a Paladin who is Sky's cousin and Daphne's husband. His weapon is the Earthquake Hammer. He and Sky have a grudge against each other. He has fair skin, wavy brown hair, and blue-green eyes. Thoren's Italian voice actor is and his English voice actor is Charlie Schlatter.
- Nex is a Paladin and a friend of Thoren. He has fair skin, gray hair, and light-brown eyes. He and Aisha become attracted to each other during the sixth season, after the death of Aisha's fiancée Nabu, and finally he became her new boyfriend. His weapon is the Halberd of the Wind. Nex's Italian voice actors are Daniele Raffaeli and Marco Bassetti [it], and his English voice actor is Adam Gregory.

== Villains ==
- The Trix are three witches with various powers. They are the main villains of the first season who start out as students at Cloud Tower, where their peers both idolize and fear them. They steal most of Bloom's power until she realizes her powers had been limited by self-doubt. She regains enough energy to defeat the Trix, and they are imprisoned in the Fortress of Roccaluce. In the second season, the Trix escape with the help of Darkar. At the beginning of season 3, they are locked up in the Omega Dimension but once again they manage to escape by freeing Valtor, with whom they ally. In season five, they gain Dark Sirenix from Tritannus. Then the Trix return as the main villains in season 6, at the end of which, they are locked inside the Legendarium. In season 7, Brafilius finds the Trix and accidentally releases them. They enact vengeance on Alfea's fairies. The Trix capture Brafilius and use the Stone of Memories to travel back to the distant past. In season 8, the Trix return to side with Valtor.
  - Icy is the eldest of the trio and their leader, whose powers are derived from ice. She despises Bloom and is the most competitive with the Winx. Icy is more aggressive than Darcy but calmer than Stormy. In season 8, her origin was revealed as not only one of the Trix that has the ice power, but also the Crowned Princess of Dyamond who decided to become the strongest witch ever so she could reverse the destruction of her planet and the transformation of her sister Sapphire into a white fox by an evil Shaman Witch. Icy's Italian voice actress is Tatiana Dessi and her Hollywood voice actress is Larisa Oleynik.
  - Darcy, the middle of the trio, derives her powers from mind, shadows, and darkness. She enjoys tormenting her enemies and is less aggressive than her friends, preferring subtle and manipulative techniques. She has fair skin, long brown hair, and a dark purple outfit, which is sometimes accompanied by glasses. Darcy's Italian voice actress is Federica De Bortoli and her Hollywood voice actress is Jennifer Cody.
  - Stormy, the youngest of the trio, has power over stormy weather. She is the most hot-tempered of the group and is prone to violent outbursts. Her impulsiveness often leads the trio to trouble. She has tan skin, a cloud-shaped purple hairstyle, and a reddish-violet outfit. Stormy's Italian voice actress is Valeria Vidali and her Hollywood voice actress is Kimberly Brooks.
- Lord Darkar, also called the Shadow Phoenix, is the main villain of the second season. He is a primordial being who caused the destruction of Domino, having trolled the Ancestral Witches and Valtor when they destroyed it. After they were defeated, Darkar was sent into a deep slumber and awakens at the beginning of the second season. He kidnaps the pixies, frees the Trix from their prison, and opens a portal to the Realm of the Relix. He nearly succeeds in his plot to claim the Ultimate Power and rule the magical universe but he is defeated by a Charmix Convergence of the Winx Club. Darkar's Italian voice actor is Fabrizio Temperini and his Hollywood voice actor is Michael Dorn.
- Valtor is a dark wizard and the main villain of the third and eighth seasons. He was created by the Ancestral Witches from a dark spark essence piece and part of the Dragon Flame. He helped the witches destroy Domino but was defeated by Oritel and Marion, who imprisoned him in the Omega Dimension. The Trix free him in the third season and become his allies. After being freed, Valtor aspires to become the greatest wizard of the magical universe by conquering each realm. At the end of the third season, Valtor turns into a demon and unleashes a spell that almost destroys Magix. The Winx release the spells that he had stolen. Bloom eventually defeats Valtor when she extinguishes the Dragon Flame. He is eventually revived by Argen in Season 8, only to be destroyed once again by the Winx. Valtor's Italian voice actor is Guido Di Naccio and his Hollywood voice actor is Josh Keaton.
- The Ancestral Witches are the three ancient witches who tried to invade the Infinite Ocean and faced the nymphs Daphne and Politea. They cursed the Nymphs' Sirenix power, turning Daphne into a disembodied spirit and Politea into a monster. They also attacked Domino to obtain the power of the Dragon Flame but were defeated by the Company of Light. Their actions destroyed Domino, freezing and darkening the planet and imprisoning its inhabitants in the Obsidian Dimension. The witches were also imprisoned and became disembodied spirits.
  - Belladonna, who has power over ice.
  - Liliss, who has power over darkness.
  - Tharma, who has power over storms.
- Mandragora is an evil witch who has power over insects, appearing only in The Secret of the Lost Kingdom. She serves the Ancestral Witches and is the guardian of Obsidian, the realm of pure evil. Her Italian voice actress is Cinzia De Carolis and her Hollywood voice actor is Carolyn Lawrence.
- The Wizards of the Black Circle are the four main villains of the fourth season. In the past, they developed a way to resist fairy magic, which allowed them to imprison all of Earth's fairies and steal magic from the planet. They battle the Winx throughout the first half of the season but they are defeated when the Winx use their Believix powers to convince the humans of Gardenia to believe in magic and fairies. This renders the Wizards' powers useless and makes them vulnerable to the attack of the Winx. Their powers are weakened and they must hide in the sewers. In the season finale, the remaining Wizards are frozen in the Omega Dimension and fall into a crevice. While the Wizards of the Black Circle share certain powers, like opening a Dark Gate to capture fairies and cast enchantments, they also have individual powers:
  - Ogron is the leader of the Wizards of the Black Circle who can absorb and deflect magic. He becomes stronger and more powerful with every blow of fairy magic he absorbs. Ogron was the main target of Aisha's vengeance after he stole the Black Gift needed to revive Nabu from his death, and wasted it on a flower. His Italian voice actor is Patrizio Prata and his Hollywood voice actor is Yuri Lowenthal.
  - Duman is a shapeshifter who can take on the appearances of animals and other people. He is defeated by Nabu while suffering from an illness caused by his unstable powers. His Italian voice actor is Davide Lepore and his Hollywood voice actor is Josh Keaton.
  - Anagan has superhuman speed. His Italian voice actor is Andrea Lavagnino and his Hollywood voice actor is Bumper Robinson.
  - Gantlos can produce powerful, destructive shockwaves. His Italian voice actor is Christian Iansante and his Hollywood voice actor is Charlie Schlatter.
- Tritannus is the main villain of the fifth season. He is Aisha's first cousin, the son of King Neptune and Queen Ligea, and the twin brother of Nereus. He is a merman royal who was sent to prison after trying to kill Nereus, who was chosen to be Neptune's heir to the throne instead of Tritannus. Tritannus was stripped of his prince title and later mutated into a demon mutant naga sea monster due to toxic pollution. Absorbing more pollution increases his strength. Tritannus is defeated by the Winx when Bloom destroys his trident that holds all of his evil powers and is banished to Oblivion for his actions. His Italian voice actor is Alberto Bognanni and his Hollywood voice actor is Adam Wylie.
- Selina is one of the main villains of the sixth season. She comes from Earth and was once a childhood old friend of Bloom. She is a freshman at Cloud Tower and owns a magical book called the Legendarium that can make legends and myths come to life. She becomes the servant of a wizard named Acheron, who was sealed within the Legendarium. Selina promised to release him in return for extraordinarily strong powers, knowledge about the Legendarium, and the ability to rule alongside him. Acheron turned against her after being released. Selina contacted Bloom telepathically and the two friends managed to imprison Acheron once again inside the Legendarium along with the Trix. Seeing the error of her ways, Selina willingly uses the Legendarium's key to lock the magic book forever. She is later reunited with her Fairy Godmother and mentor, Eldora, and welcomed back as a student. Selina's Italian voice actress is Eleonora Reti and her Hollywood voice actress is Jessica DiCicco.
- Acheron is one of the main villains of the sixth season. He is a powerful and dangerous wizard who had learned dark magic on Earth. He created a book called the Legendarium and tried to use it to become the strongest and most feared wizard of the magical universe, but he could not control its powers and became trapped within its pages. In season six, he persuades Selina to work for him and become strong enough to release him. In exchange, Acheron promised to grant Selina great powers and knowledge about the Legendarium. Once released by Selina, however, he turns against her and is defeated by Bloom when she traps him inside the Infinity Box, which can permanently hold anything magical. Acheron's Italian voice actor is Marco Bassetti and his Hollywood voice actor is Sam Riegel.
- Politea is the main villain of The Mystery of the Abyss. She was the Sirenix nymph who originally fought alongside Daphne to protect the Magic Dimension and the Infinite Ocean from the Ancestral Witches. When the Ancestral Witches placed a curse on Sirenix that caused Daphne to lose her physical self entirely, Politea refused to help and betrayed Daphne. This led to the Ancestral Witches cursing Politea as well, turning her into a mindless dragon-like monster and making her Sirenix powers evil. Over the years, Politea had lived in a shark-shaped cave in the Infinite Ocean. Darcy and Stormy stole Politea's evil Sirenix abilities and she faded from reality. In The Mystery of the Abyss, Politea returns as a grayish-blue-colored spirit and allies herself with the Trix to obtain a powerful object called the Pearl of the Depths. Politea persuades the Trix to manipulate Tritannus into abducting Sky and using him to obtain the powers of the Emperor's Throne. When Tritannus acquires the pearl, she reveals herself to him and uses her dark magic to control him and the Trix. Politea is destroyed by a powerful Sirenix convergence of the Winx augmented by the Pearl of the Depths. Her Italian voice actress is Alessandra Korompay and her English voice actress is Wendee Lee.
- Kalshara and Brafilius are the main villains of the seventh season. Kalshara is a shape-shifter and Brafilius is her clumsy brother who has dark magic powers. Their goal is to capture all of the Fairy Animals of the Magic Dimension and acquire their power. Kalshara and Brafilius were once humans but became animal-like creatures when Kalshara gained wild magic. Brafilius stole the stone of memories from Roxy and used it to travel back in time with the Winx. When Kalshara got the ultimate power, Brafilius betrayed her, stole it for himself, and used it to summon the most power animals in the magic dimension. The Trix then captured Brafilius and turned him into a dog, forcing Kalshara to form a temporary truce with the Winx to help restore him. When the Trix were banished to limbo, the ultimate power was removed from Brafilius. Kalshara was so furious over losing the ultimate power that she disowned Brafilius as her brother but fell into a magic vortex when confronted by the cave creatures who defended Brafilius. Kalshara was gone but Brafilius had a change of heart and now lives with the friendly cave creatures. Kalshara and Brafilius are respectively voiced by Emilia Costa and Carlo Scipioni in Italian.
- Argen (named Obscurum while under Valtor's darker magic) is a secondary villain in the eighth season. He is the brother of Queen Dorana of Lumenia. Jealous of Queen Dorana's power over their people, he channeled the energy of Valtor and used the power of the stars to revive him. In return, Valtor gave Argen dark powers and changed his appearance. But in Season 8, Episode 13, after he hears Dorana, Obscurum opens his heart and transform back to Argen, his true self. Argen's Italian voice actor is Paolo De Santis.

== Supporting characters ==
=== College staff and students ===
==== Alfea ====
Alfea College for Fairies is a fairy school in the Magic Dimension. Alfea's staff members include:

- Faragonda is the kind and caring, yet strict but fair Headmistress of Alfea and the teacher of Convergence, and is a mentor to the Winx. Faragonda has a good relationship and a small rivalry with Ms. Griffin of Cloud Tower, a school for witches. In the third season, it is revealed that this is because they had worked together to defend Domino from Valtor and the Ancestral Witches. Her Italian voice actresses are Roberta Greganti and Giò Giò Rapattoni, while in the animated films she is voiced by Emanuela Rossi. Her Hollywood voice actress is Kari Wahlgren.
- Griselda is the vice-principal to Ms. Faragonda and Head of Discipline at Alfea. Griselda is the strictest teacher in Alfea who teaches techniques involving defense and reflection abilities, as well as new spells. Her Italian voice actresses are Franca Lumachi and Rachele Paolelli, and her Hollywood voice actress is Susan Blakeslee.
- Wizgiz is a leprechaun teacher of Shapeshifting. He is the oldest member of Alfea's staff and has been teaching for 1,000 years. He can be uptight at times and has a difficult relationship with Stella due to her lack of interest in her grades. His Italian voice actors are Mino Caprio and Stefano Onofri, and his Hollywood voice actor is Dee Bradley Baker.
- Palladium is an elf who teaches Potionology at Alfea. He is also in charge of the Magical Reality chamber, a simulator that creates a virtual world. In the first season, he is unassertive and lacks confidence. In the second season, he evolves into a more confident character with an older appearance. His Italian voice actors are Vittorio Guerrieri and Stefano Onofri and his Hollywood voice actor is Mitchell Whitfield.
- Professor DuFour is a rarely seen teacher. She wears a large scarlet hat and teaches about "good ways" (manners). She has been seen in a few episodes, including an implication that she was once close friends with Musa's parents.
- Concorda is the guardian of Alfea's Codex. She is bonded to the magic archive of Alfea, where the Codex is hidden within the shelves of books. Concorda loves reading. She also has three pixie pets: a frog, a dingo/fox and a sea horse. She is one of the four powerful pixies in the realm of Magix. Her Italian voice actress is Alessia La Monica.
- Knut is a greenly tinted mustard yellow ogre who originally worked for Cloud Tower, and currently works at Alfea. He is near-sighted; a running joke in Season 1 is that he has to help the Trix or he will be forced to always wear his glasses. He later defects to the good side, fearing the Trix will target his species. He becomes a janitor at Alfea. His Italian voice actors are Roberto Draghetti and Stefano Billi, and his Hollywood voice actor is Peter Emshwiller.

Other Alfea students include:

- Mirta is a fairy who used to be a witch at Cloud Tower before joining Alfea. For interfering in the Trix's business, she is turned into a pumpkin for the second half of the first season. Flora keeps the pumpkin in her room and takes care of it affectionately, trying several times to turn her back. By the end of the first season, she is turned back into a girl and becomes a transfer student to Alfea. Her Italian voice actress is Gaia Bolognesi and her Hollywood voice actress is Natalie Lander.
- Amaryl is a fairy who wears a yellow and green fairy outfit and has pink and orange wings. She has a bit of an attitude and sometimes she is comical. Amaryl may have a friendly relationship with Mirta and Lucy, as she can be seen with them at Musa's concert during season 2, and the three of them are invited by Musa to come on stage with the Winx for the last song. She and Stella didn't get along very well through the first two seasons, as Amaryl had tried to attack Stella in one of their classes. At the end of season 3, Stella and Amaryl have put aside their conflicts.
- Francis is a fairy with a harlequin fairy outfit. She is friendly, seeing as she hands tissues to everyone while Musa sings a sad but very beautiful song during her concert in season 2, but definitely has an attitude as she mocked Timmy when he came looking for Tecna later in the season, during Tecna's phase of hating Timmy.
- Nova is a fairy that debuted in season 3. She has fair skin tone, straight long bright orange hip-length hair with long bangs and teal eyes. She is from Solaria, and when the Winx, minus Stella, are on Andros, she is the one that gives Stella all the latest news about Solaria. She has a high interest in reading everything. Her Italian voice actress is Monica Ward.
- Krystal is the Princess of Lynphea. She has fair skin tone, straight long light purple pink knee-length hair, and light green eyes. She is a childhood friend of Helia.

==== Red Fountain ====
Red Fountain is a school in Magix which trains warriors called the Specialists. Members of Red Fountain's staff include:

- Saladin: The headmaster of Red Fountain and Helia's Uncle. He is an old, very powerful mage. It is revealed in season 3 that he, Faragonda and Griffin helped defend Domino against the Ancestral Witches as part of the Company of Light along with Bloom's birth parents.
- Codatorta is the vice-principal and the Head of Discipline at Red Fountain. Not much is known about him other than that he is very robust and active and that he was once a Templar of Roccaluce.
- Athena is the pixie guardian of Redfountain's Codex who wears a Greek goddess dress. She is one of the four powerful pixies in the realm of Magix.

Red Fountain students include:

- Bishop, a specialist with markings on his forehead and a purple ponytail.
- Jared is a dark-haired specialist who had a crush on Musa in season two and was manipulated by Darcy to sabotage a test the Winx were taking. He and Musa end up as friends, but by the end of season two Jared is seen with a new love interest: a fairy named Alice.

==== Cloud Tower ====
Cloud Tower is the main school for witches in the Magic Dimension. Cloud Tower's staff includes:

- Griffin is the Headmistress of Cloud Tower and a good friend of Faragonda. Griffin can seem strict but she cares for her students and will defend them if threatened. She once teamed up with Valtor to work for the Ancestral Witches when she was a young witch. She escaped and defended Domino alongside Faragonda and Saladin against the Ancestral Witches. Her Italian voice actress is Antonella Giannini and her Hollywood voice actress is Grey DeLisle.
- Editrude teaches hexes at Cloud Tower and is the sister of Zarathustra.
- Zarathustra: teaches mayhem at Cloud Tower and is the sister of Editrude.
- Discorda is the pixie guardian of Cloud Tower's Codex and hides in the heart of Cloud Tower. She is naughty, loves fashion and is a little mean. She wears a black and purple dress and is one of the four powerful pixies in the realm of Magix.

Cloud Tower students include:

- Lucy is Mirta's only real friend at Cloud Tower. Lucy is tall and pale, and has low self-esteem and desperately wants to befriend the Trix in the first season. Lucy is proud of being a witch and took Mirta's rejection of dark magic as a personal insult. Her Italian voice actress is Milvia Bonacini and her Hollywood voice actress is Jessica DiCicco.

=== Characters from the Realms ===
==== Magix ====
Magix is a realm located at the centre of the Magic Dimension and the planet where the three schools Alfea, Cloud Tower and Red Fountain are located.

===== Black-Mud Swamp =====
- The Water Nymphs are magical beings who look like tiny little mermaids and live in underwater bubbles made of a material that they produce from the leaves of the Xylith plant.
  - Queen Algae is the queen of the Water Nymphs.
  - Lusiz is one of the Water Nymphs who once went to pick Xylith leaves but fell into a deep sleep because of the Red Willow. The Winx defeated the tree and saved Lusiz.
- The Giant Turtle is a gigantic turtle who used to lay asleep in the Black-Mud Swamp because of the Red Willow's sleeping gas, due to which its shell was mistaken for an island and its head for a monster until Bloom and Tecna freed it by defeating the willow.
- Red Willow: A magical plant that grew on the back of the giant turtle. The leader of the Red Willows, it emitted a gas that made all creatures around it sleep until it was defeated by Tecna and Bloom.

===== Pixie Village =====
A village in the Dark Forest where the pixies live in the series.

- Ninfea is the protector of Pixie Village in the Dark Forest and the village's Codex. Ninfea is very kind and wears a green gown and has a green staff.
- Jolly is the Pixie of Fortune-Telling and wears a joker-type outfit. She appears in a few episodes and uses a version of tarot cards to tell the future and her visions always come true, but some people don't believe her. Jolly is Livy's big sister. Her Italian voice actress is Monica Ward.
- Livy is the Pixie of Messages and surfs on folded messages. She has a habit of being forgetful, but what she lacks in memory, she makes up in heart. In the second season, Livy accidentally reveals the location of the Pixie Village to Icy and Darkar. Sometimes when Livy has to send a message, she gets so excited that she leaves without even knowing what the message is. Her folded message surf board can sense if someone needs to send a message. Livy is one of the few pixies shown to have a family, with Jolly as her sister.
- Zing is the Pixie of Bugs. Zing wears a fluffy scarf around her neck and is known for her comical imitations of numerous famous characters, such as Spider-Man, Doctor Octopus, Jujube, and Professor Lupin from Harry Potter. Zing is very hyper. She seems to be very fond of the Red Fountain boys, Brandon in particular, while they are very fond of her too.
- Glim (also known as Blinky) is the Pixie of Fireflies and, like Piff, is still a baby. Glim has wings that look like orange fan-like bugs. When she is happy, her stomach will light up.

==== Lord Darkar's Fortress ====
Located between the surface of Magix and Downland. A cavernous area that is the location of Lord Darkar's palace, Shadowhaunt, and the home of the shadow creatures. The stone drains magic and power.

- Keborg was a bat-like creature that serves Lord Darkar as a spy. Lord Darkar often transformed Kerborg into large monsters and sends him on important missions.

===== Downland =====
- King Enervus and Queen Quoeda are Amentia's parents.
- Princess Amentia is the princess of Downland and an excellent warrior who will fight to the finish. She is obsessed with perfection and tidiness and is ruthless in pursuit of her goals and impolite in manner. She tried to force Brandon into marrying her early during season 2 until Amore intervened and caused her to reciprocate Sponsus's feelings.
- Sponsus was Princess Amentia's loyal servant. He is deeply in love with her and attempted to win her heart by bestowing gifts on her, but she did not return his affections until Amore helped him.

===== The Fortress of Light =====
Also known as Lightrock Monastery, it is a temple high above the clouds on a huge and rocky mountain, located above Lake Roccaluce in non-space. The fortress is unreachable for almost anyone except for advanced magicians who can travel through dimensions. After season one, the Trix are sent there for unleashing the Army of Darkness on Magix, but are broken out in the second season by Lord Darkar. At the end of season 3, they are captured by the Templars after working with Valtor and are sent to the Prison of Andros.

- The Templars of Roccaluce are knight-monks who study Wu-Gong, an ancient martial art that makes them very highly qualified, magic-resistant warriors.
- The Lord of the Templars is the leader of the templars and the one who defeated Lord Darkar and sent him in a 17-year-long slumber after the destruction of Domino.

==== Earth ====
- Mike and Vanessa are Bloom's adoptive parents on Earth. Mike is a firefighter and Vanessa is a kind-hearted florist who runs her own flower shop. Mike and Vanessa are respectively voiced by Roberto Certomà and Barbara De Bortoli in Italian; their Hollywood voice actors are James Patrick Stuart and April Stewart.
- Mitzi is Bloom's spoiled former neighbor, classmate, and rival. She made fun of Bloom when they went to the same school in Gardenia. She temporarily becomes a Dark Fairy after accepting an offer from the Wizards of the Black Circle in season 4. Mitzi's Italian voice actress is Monica Vulcano and her Hollywood voice actress is Daniella Monet.
- Macy is Mitzi's little sister. While Mitzi is a big fan of the Trix, Macy is a sweet person and befriends the Winx.
- Jason Queen is a recording artist who discovers Musa's singing talent and decides to make her a pop star.
- Andy was Bloom's ex-boyfriend from high school.
- Queen Morgana and Klaus are Roxy's parents. Morgana, loosely based on Morgan le Fay from the Arthurian legend, is the former queen of the Earth fairies who led their revenge against the Black Circle for imprisoning them. In the fourth season, she abdicates her throne to live with her husband and daughter in Gardenia. Klaus is a human from Earth who does not find out about Morgana's powers until later in the series. He owns the Frutti Music Bar where he and his daughter Roxy work. Morgana's Italian voice actresses are Alessandra Cassioli and Francesca Rinaldi. Klaus's Italian voice actor is Claudio Moneta. Morgana and Klaus's respective Hollywood voices are Mindy Sterling and Michael Donovan.
- Eldora is a Fairy Godmother and the Guardian of the Legendarium. In her youth, she was an Alfea student and, after many travels across the magical universe, became the guardian of the lost Library of Alexandria where she had guarded the Legendarium. On meeting Selina she found that the young girl had great magical potential and decided to become a fairy godmother. However, Selina's demeanor changed because of the Legendarium and she chose to become a witch instead of a fairy, gladly choosing to work for her master and new mentor, Acheron, in return for great power and rule by his side. Eldora now lives in Gardenia and flowers are her passion.
- Lu Wei is the last dragon tamer of Earth. He lives in China, near the Great Wall of China.

===== Tir Na Nog =====
Tir Na Nog is the realm of the Earth fairies, located in the magic dimension. When the Wizards of the Black Circle captured the Earth fairies, they imprisoned them in their own kingdom of Tir Na Nog, where the terrestrial fairies remained until Roxy and the Winx freed them in season 4. It's loosely based on Tír na nÓg from Irish folklore.

- Queen Nebula is Morgana's second-in-command. She is one of the powerful terrestrial fairies who was trapped within the mystical White Circle. She used to be the Fairy of Peace but she turned into the Fairy of War due to her intense hatred for humans and the Fairy Hunters. At the end of the fourth season, she lets go of her revenge and becomes the new Queen of the Earth Fairies, and, in Season 6, the Headmistress of Tir Na Nog Fairy College! What a coincidence. Her Italian voice actresses are Valentina Mari and Rachele Paolelli, and her Hollywood voice actresses are Karen Strassman and Grey DeLisle.
- Diana is the major fairy of nature and lives in the Amazon Forest with her followers, the Amazon fairies.
- Aurora is the major Earth fairy of the North and lives in a floating ice palace called the Ice Tower. Her followers are the Arctic fairies.
- Sibylla is the major fairy of Justice and lives in a cave located in the Sibillini Mountains in Italy along with her followers, the Rustic fairies.

==== Domino ====
- King Oritel and Queen Marion are the biological parents of Daphne and Bloom, as well as the rulers of Domino. Their planet was destroyed by the Ancestral Witches and they were trapped in a dark realm called the Circle of Obsidian. Bloom did not know their whereabouts for much of her life. Bloom eventually learns from the Ancestral Witches that they are alive in a place beyond the Magical Dimension's reach. In the first movie, Bloom frees Oritel and Marion after destroying the Obsidian dimension and reviving Domino, allowing the three to reunite. King Oritel's Italian voice actors are Luca Graziani and Marco Bassetti and his Hollywood voice actor is Josh Keaton. Queen Marion's Italian voice actress is Rachele Paolelli, and her Hollywood voice actresses are Larisa Oleynik and Grey DeLisle.
- Daphne, Bloom's older sister, is the Nymph of Sirenix. She derives her magical powers and spells from the sea and the four Elements: Water, Fire, Earth and Air. Until Season 5, Daphne is a disembodied spirit due to a curse the Ancestral Witches cast upon her. She can telepathically communicate with Bloom and guides her throughout the first three seasons, helping Bloom to restore Domino and free their parents. In the fifth season, Bloom uses her Sirenix wish to have the curse of Sirenix broken forever, which restores Daphne to her physical form. In Season 6, Daphne reconnects with her Sirenix powers and joins Alfea as the History of Magic teacher. She becomes crown princess of her home world and marries Sky's cousin Thoren. Daphne's Italian voice actress is Raffaella Castelli and her Hollywood voice actress is Elizabeth Gillies.
- Lord Bartelby was the official scribe of King Oritel and wrote the Book of Fate for him. His spirit now resides in the book.

==== Eraklyon ====
- King Erendor and Queen Samara are the parents of Sky and the rulers of Eraklyon. Before season 1, they paired their son up with Princess Diaspro as his girlfriend, but Sky disapproved of this match and fell in love with Bloom. Before the destruction of Domino, Erendor was a friend of Oritel until the Ancestral Witches forced him to betray his promise to Oritel to protect Domino.
- Diaspro is a member of Eraklyon's nobility who was Sky's arranged girlfriend until he met Bloom. She has the powers of gems. She is a selfish and materialistic princess who has little regard for the well-being of others. In the third season, Diaspro tries to win back Sky's affection by allying with Valtor and having herself nominated as the King's liaison officer of Eraklyon, but she fails. In the sixth season, Diaspro allies with the Trix. Diaspro's Italian voice actresses are Alessia La Monica and Katia Sorrentino. Her voice actresses are Ariana Grande and Cassandra Morris.
- Yoshinoya is a powerful man who wants to take control of Eraklyon, and due to whom Sky and Brandon had to switch identities in Season 1. In Season 2, he kidnapped Diaspro but the Winx saved her.

==== Solaria ====
- King Radius and Queen Luna are Stella's divorced parents. Radius possesses the powers of Solaria's Sun and his life force is fused with the second sun of Solaria. Luna has the powers of the moon and the light of Solaria. Luna's Italian voice actress is Ilaria Giorgino and Radius's Italian voice actor is Fabrizio Temperini. Radius and Luna's respective Hollywood voices are André Sogliuzzo and Megan Cavanaugh.
- Countess Cassandra and her daughter Chimera are nobles from Solaria who are introduced in the third season. They team up with Valtor to gain control of Solaria. Cassandra is engaged to Stella's father Radius and casts a spell on him that forces him to do everything she says, including banishing Stella. Chimera, who started a rivalry with Stella earlier in her debut season from snatching things the latter rightfully ordered (a pizza she ordered for herself and the Winx and even a dress for her Princess Ball), uses her magic to turn Stella into a monster and replaces her as princess of Solaria. After Stella defeats them, King Radius calls off his wedding to Cassandra and sends them to the dungeon. Countess Cassandra and Chimera are respectively voiced by Francesca Draghetti and Raffaella Castelli, their voices in the Nickelodeon dub provided by Kath Soucie and Rachael MacFarlane.

==== Lynphea ====
- Queen Rachel is the ruler of Lynphea and Krystal's mom.
- Miele is Flora's younger sister whose powers are derived from plants. Miele helps the Winx when they visit Lynphea. Her name is Rose in the 4Kids dub. Her Italian voice actresses are Benedetta Gravina and Gaia Bolognesi, and her Hollywood voice actress is Jessica DiCicco.
- Alyssa and Rhodos are the parents of Flora and Miele.

==== Melody ====
- King Garomius is the ruler of Melody and Galatea's father.
- Ho-Boe is a musician and Musa's widower father. His wife Matlin was a singer who died when Musa was young. Ho-Boe can be over-protective of Musa because he is afraid he will lose her as well. He makes sporadic appearances throughout the series while Matlin appears in flashbacks and in a holograph that Musa carries. Ho-Boe's Italian voice actor is Fabrizio Temperini. He and Matlin's Hollywood voice actors are Jim Ward and Laura Bailey, respectively.
- Diletta is a friend of Daphne and the Headmistress of the Golden Auditorium, a music school found in Melody.

==== Zenith ====
- King Cryos is the ruler of Zenith.
- Magnethia and Electronio are Tecna's parents. They are inventors with an interest in science. They live on Zenith and collect a range of technological devices. They disapprove of Timmy when they first meet him, but they accept him after he demonstrates his intelligence and proves his love for Tecna. Magnethia and Electronio are voiced by Ilaria Giorgino and Vittorio Guerrieri in Italian; their Hollywood voice actors are Jennifer Cody and Dee Bradley Baker.

==== Andros ====
- King Teredor and Queen Niobe are the rulers of the lands of Andros and the parents of Aisha. King Teredor is also the brother of King Neptune.
- King Neptune and Queen Ligea are the merpeople rulers of the seas of Andros, and the parents of Tressa, Nereus and Tritannus. Neptune is also the brother of Teredor, making him the uncle of Aisha.
- Tressa is a mermaid princess and a cousin of Aisha. Her Hollywood voice actress is Laura Bailey.
- Nereus is the crown prince of the seas of Andros, the twin brother of Tritannus, and a cousin of Aisha.
- Anne was a childhood friend of Aisha who appeared in Aisha's flashbacks throughout Seasons 2 and 3.

==== Pyros ====
Pyros is an island populated by dragons.

- Maia is an ascetic sorceress who lives on Pyros and an old friend of Faragonda who helped Bloom earn her Enchantix.
- Buddy is Bloom's Inner Dragon, which manifested itself in the form of a baby dragon.

==== Hoggar ====
- Hagen the blacksmith was a member of the Company of Light along with Marion, Oritel, Faragonda, Griffin and Saladin.

==== Lumenia ====
Lumenia, the star that lights Solaria, is home to a magical alien species called Lumens who are introduced in the eighth season and can generate magic stardust.

- Queen Dorana is the queen of stars who acts as the ruler of Lumenia. Dorana is voiced by Daniela Abbruzzese.
- Twinkly is the messenger of Lumenia. Twinkly is voiced by Giulia Tarquini.

==== The Golden Kingdom ====
The Golden Kingdom is a place both outside and inside time and space where the Water Stars, the opposing force of the Dragon Fire, are kept.

- Arcadia is the first Fairy to have existed.
- The Ancient Ones are the other inhabitants of the Golden Kingdom, and, along with Arcadia, they have been alive since the beginning of the Magic Dimension and are guardians of the Water Stars, and include:
  - a mermaid-like being
  - a centaur
  - an owl-like creature.

==== Infinite Ocean ====
- Omnia is the Supreme Guardian of Sirenix who grants the power of Sirenix to fairies who have completed the Sirenix quest. She invites the Winx and selkies to enter the Infinite Ocean after they complete their quest. Her Hollywood voice actress is Nika Futterman.
- The Guardian Selkies guard the three Pillars of the Infinite Ocean that support the whole Magic Dimension: the Pillar of Light, the Pillar of Control and the Pillar of Balance.

==== Legendarium World ====
- The Doorway to the Worlds is a giant structure in the Legendarium World, which tells the Winx to find the Fantasy Emerald and Silver Spear in order to forge the key to lock the Legendarium. According to Eldora's research, it is considered to be the keeper of all knowledge.
- Rumpelstiltskin is the most cunning, stubborn, and brilliant dwarf. He lives in the clearing of the Legendarium World's version of Alfea. He is also very tricky but follows the agreements he makes with others. Due to being exposed in Alfea, he had learned very powerful enchantments when he lived there. Based in part on Rumpelstiltskin from German folklore.
- The Children of the Night are vampires who possess powers to control the minds of others and the power to steal any form of magic/basic energy. They were defeated by Stella when she used pure sunlight to eradicate them.
- The Minotaur lives in the eponymous Labyrinth of the Minotaur in the Legendarium World, where Darcy, disguised as Ariadne from the myth of Theseus and the Minotaur, led Stella to reclaim her crown of Solaria.
- Frankenstein, held together by knots and bolts, rampaged in the city of planet Zenith and fell for Tecna, taking her into his home within the Legendarium World.
- The Gloomy Wood Trolls had wrought endless terror and destruction until they were defeated by the pixies' and imprisoned underneath Pixie Village.

=== Pets ===
- Kiko is Bloom's pet rabbit. He has blue fur with white splashes. He is highly intelligent but no one else seems to notice. He is able to pass through the magic barrier that blocks outsiders from Alfea, and in season 2, he exhibits some magic powers.
- Lady is Sky's pet dog. Lady only appears in the first season.
- Pepe is Icy's pet duckling who appears only in the first season.
- Artu is Roxy's pet dog. Artu has pale brown fur and pitch-black eyes. Like Kiko, he displays an unusually high amount of intelligence for a dog, but only Roxy notices this as she is the Fairy of Animals. In World of Winx, he is renamed Arthur and Roxy can see what he sees through his own eyes and hear what he hears through his own ears.
- Peg is a female horse gifted to Bloom by her birth parents in "Winx Club 3D: Magical Adventure". She transforms into an Alicorn after eating the magical seedling in the lost city of Havram in Eraklyon.

=== Bonded Beings ===
==== Pixies ====
The Pixies are the first magical beings who bond with the Fairies. They are introduced in the second season after the Winx rescue them from Darkar. Based in part on the pixies of British folklore, each has a special talent.

- Lockette is the Pixie of Portals (later changed to the Pixie of Direction). She is Bloom's bonded pixie, whom she helps in pathfinding both physically and emotionally.
- Amore is the Pixie of Love (later changed to the Pixie of Feelings). She is Stella's bonded pixie.
- Chatta is the Pixie of Gossip and Flora's bonded pixie. She is extremely talkative, enjoys writing cheers, and encourages Flora to vocalize her thoughts.
- Tune is the Pixie of Etiquette and is Musa's bonded pixie. She is prim and proper with purple hair. Tune believes in being ladylike and constantly nags Musa, who is known for her outgoing behavior.
- Digit is the Pixie of Nanotechnology and is Tecna's bonded pixie. She shows little emotion but has a close relationship with Tecna. They challenge each other's minds, discuss similar interests, and speak in a similarly complex manner.
- Piff is the Pixie of Sweet Dreams and is Aisha's bonded pixie. She relieves nightmares by falling asleep on the dreamer's head, which helps relieve Aisha's nightmares. Piff cannot talk and communicates in baby babble. Aisha's restlessness is balanced by Piff's constant sleepiness.
- Caramel is the Pixie of Super-Strength. She replaces Digit as Tecna's pixie in season 6.
- Cherie is the Pixie of Weather. She replaces Tune as Musa's pixie in season 6. She also has the ability to control the weather when she is happy, sad, or angry.

==== Fairy Pets ====
The Fairy Pets are a group of soft toys from Earth that were brought to life by the Winx's magic.

- Belle the white-furred lamb is Bloom's fairy pet.
- Ginger the poodle puppy is Stella's fairy pet.
- Coco the kitty is Flora's fairy pet.
- Pepe the bear is Musa's fairy pet.
- Chicko the duckling is Tecna's fairy pet.
- Milly the bunny is Aisha's fairy pet and Kiko's girlfriend.
- An unnamed tiger who only appears on merchandise is Roxy's fairy pet.

==== Selkies ====
The Selkies live in oceans and work as gatekeepers of the ocean portals to various planets. They are based in part on the selkies of Gaelic folklore. In the fifth season, Tritannus steals their powers to get access to the Infinite Ocean; their powers are restored when a fairy from their respective home planet bonds with them. Selkies can sense when their bonded fairy is nearby.

- Serena, the gatekeeper of Domino, is bonded to Bloom. Voiced by Laura Bailey.
- Illiris, the gatekeeper of Solaria, is bonded to Stella. Voiced by Lauren Weissman.
- Desiryee, the gatekeeper of Lynphea, is bonded to Flora. Voiced by Amber Hood.
- Sonna, the gatekeeper of Melody, is bonded to Musa. Voiced by Hope Levy.
- Lithia, the gatekeeper of Zenith, is bonded to Tecna. Voiced by Natalie Lander.
- Lemmy, the gatekeeper of Andros, is bonded to Aisha. Voiced by Morgan Deckner.
- Phylla, the gatekeeper of Earth, is not bonded to any fairy. Voiced by Romi Dames.
- Nissa, the gatekeeper of Magix, is also not bonded to any fairy. Voiced by Sugar Lyn Beard.

==== Fairy Animals ====
The Fairy Animals are magical creatures to which the Winx become bonded in the seventh season. Each one has a power or secret that maintains order in the universe.

- Elas the Unicorn is Bloom's bonded Fairy Animal.
- Shiny the Shinygreed is Stella's bonded Fairy Animal.
- Amarok the Magiwolf is Flora's bonded Fairy Animal.
- Critty the Quillcat is Musa's bonded Fairy Animal.
- Squonk the Cry-Cry is Aisha's bonded Fairy Animal.
- Flitter the TechSquirrel is Tecna's bonded Fairy Animal.

==== Other characters ====
- The Ethereal Fairies are very powerful and ancient fairies who live out of time and space. They appeared in Season 4 when they bestowed the three Gifts of Destiny- those of Sophix, Lovix and the Black Gift - on the Winx.
