= Cinzia De Carolis =

Italian actress (born 1960)

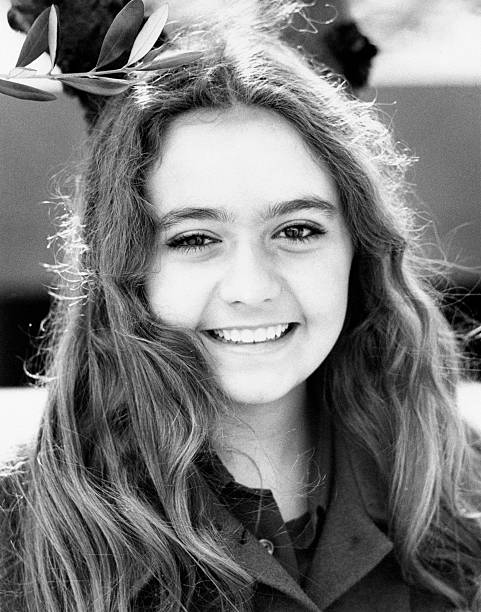
- Cinzia De Carolis in 1974.
- Born: 22 March 1960 (age 65); Rome, Italy
- Occupations: Actor; voice actress; dialogue writer/adapter; dubbing director; singer
- Years active: 1968–present
- Musical career
- Genres: Pop; Children's music
- Instrument: Vocals
- Labels: E.P.; La voce del padrone; Erre; Produttori Associati; Durium; Hobby

Cinzia De Carolis (born 22 March 1960) is an Italian actress and singer. She appeared in more than fifteen films since 1968 including her performance as Lori in The Cat o' Nine Tails.

== Selected filmography ==
Year	Title	Role	Notes
1970	Angeli senza paradiso	Irina Roskoff	
1970	Fermate il mondo... voglio scendere!	Running little girl	Uncredited
1971	The Cat o' Nine Tails	Lori	
1972	The Night of the Devils	Irina	
1974	I figli di nessuno		
1975	Vergine e di nome Maria	Maria	
1979	Libidine	Anna	
1980	Cannibal Apocalypse	Mary	As Cindy Hamilton
1982	Giggi il bullo	Marietta, Venetian prostitute	
1983	Stesso mare stessa spiaggia	Concetta	
1991	Una donna da guardare	Marisa	
2007	Winx Club: The Secret of the Lost Kingdom	Mandragora (voice)	Animated film
