= World of Winx =

Italian animated TV series

- Genre: Action; Adventure; Comedy; Fantasy; Magical Girl
- Created by: Iginio Straffi
- Based on: Winx Club
- Directed by: Iginio Straffi
- Voices of: Letizia Ciampa; Perla Liberatori; Ilaria Latini; Domitilla D'Amico; Gemma Donati; Laura Lenghi
- Opening theme: "Winx Club Sparkles of Light" performed by lead: Alessia Orlando and chorus: Elisa Aramonte
- Ending theme: "The Wonderful World of Winx" performed by lead: Alessia Orlando and chorus: Elisa Aramonte
- Composers: Michele Bettali; Stefano Carrara; Fabrizio Castania
- Country of origin: Italy
- Original languages: English; Italian
- No. of seasons: 2
- No. of episodes: 26

Production
- Executive producer: Joanne Lee
- Producer: Iginio Straffi
- Editors: Alessandro Bracalente Beatrice Latini; Ambrogio Moretti; Saverio Romagnoli Giorgia Tranquilli
- Running time: 24 minutes
- Production company: Rainbow S.p.A.

Original release
- Network: Rai Gulp (Italy); Netflix (international)
- Release: 4 November 2016 – 16 June 2017

Related
- Winx Club

World of Winx is an Italian animated television series and a spin-off of Winx Club. The series was created by Iginio Straffi. Twenty-six episodes were produced in two seasons, the first of which was premiered as a Netflix original series on 4 November 2016.

The series was produced by Rainbow S.p.A., a studio co-owned by Straffi and Viacom at the time. The series was released on Netflix in most territories worldwide. Exceptions included Italy and Greece, where it was broadcast on Rai Gulp and Viacom's Nickelodeon, respectively. In 2016, Rainbow's Cristiana Buzzelli confirmed that the Netflix streaming company did "not enter into the creative process on scripts, characters or plot lines." Season 1 was removed from Netflix on 4 November 2026, 10 years after it was originally released on the platform.

== Story ==
The Winx Club girls return to Gardenia, Bloom's hometown on Earth, where they work as a group of talent scouts on a reality television program to find children and teenagers of various talents. Behind the scenes, they try to save them from being kidnapped by a Talent Thief while hiding their own identities as fairies. In the first season, the Winx achieve a new level of magical transformation, which is called "Dreamix". They get help on occasion from their good friend and fellow fairy Roxy, the owner of the Frutti Music Bar.

In the second season, the Winx receive new missions from the spirit of the World of Dreams. They learn of the Queen's troubled past and hope to return her to the good fairy she was once by reuniting her with her lost love, Peter Pan. Their Dreamix transformations and powers are upgraded to "Onyrix". Initially, Jim and Smee ally with the Winx in facing the Queen and her shadow creatures. The Winx must also deal with special shadow creatures called a Nemesis (Vertigo, Banshee, Obscura, Stoney, Sinka and Virus) which are drawn from the dark essence of each of the fairies' deepest uncertainties.

== Characters ==
=== Winx Club ===
The series features the six main fairies from the original Winx Club series:

- Bloom: Fairy of the Dragon Flame and the leader of the Winx Club who is from the restored planet Domino (Sparx in some dub) but grew up on Earth. She has red-orange waist-length hair and light blue eyes. As the keeper of the powerful Dragon Flame, the cosmic power of the Great Dragon himself, she can control fire, heat and lava as well as heal. She is voiced by Letizia Ciampa in Italian and by Haven Paschall in English.
- Stella: Fairy of the Shining Sun from the planet Solaria. She has waist-length blonde hair and hazel brown eyes. She loves drawing designs and fashion. Her magic is derived from light (sunlight, moonlight and starlight). In season 2, her stronger power gives her the ability to look into the memories made in a location. She is voiced by Perla Liberatori in Italian and by Rebecca Soler in English.
- Flora: Fairy of Nature from the planet Lynphea. The most kind-hearted of the Winx Club. She has waist-length honey-colored hair, green eyes and tan skin. Her magic enables her to create, control and communicate with plants, vegetation and the element of Earth. She is voiced by Ilaria Latini in Italian and by Eileen Stevens in English.
- Tecna: Fairy of Technology from the planet Zenith. She has short purple hair, turquoise eyes and pale skin. She can speak to all types of machinery and electronics, and she can also control lightning. When she is combined with dark magic, she can be turned into her dark-robot of herself. She is voiced by Domitilla D'Amico in Italian and by Saskia Maarleveld in English.
- Musa: Fairy of Music from the planet Melody. She has waist-length dark blue hair with bangs, dark eyes and pale skin. She has the power to create powerful ultrasonic waves of incredibly high frequencies and create solid barriers of sound. She is voiced by Gemma Donati in Italian and by Kate Bristol in English.
- Aisha: Fairy of Waves from the planet Andros. She has wavy tawny port brown hair, gray-blue eyes and dark skin. She has the power to create and manipulate water as well as a pink liquid called "Morphix". She is voiced by Laura Lenghi in Italian and by Alysha Deslorieux in English.

=== Others ===
- Roxy: Fairy of Animals from planet Earth. Friend and pupil of the Winx. She has magenta hair and blue-purple eyes. She works at the Frutti Music Bar. She has a dog named Arthur, with whom she can use her strong animal-related magic to see whatever he sees from a great distance. Roxy helped Bloom, after she was fired from WOW!, in eluding the persistent detectives Gomez and Evans. Besides the Winx, she is the only WoW character to come from the original series. She is voiced by Debora Magnaghi in Italian and by Suzy Myers in English.
- Ace: the host of the Wow! show. He has grey hair with white streaks. He always strives to be positive and enthusiastic when he is on camera, but off-screen, he loses patience because the Winx regularly disappear from the show and evade his show's camera drones. He is especially annoyed by Bloom. In the episode "The Fashion Week", when she accidentally knocks off his hairpiece in front of the camera, he is so enraged that he fires Bloom on the spot, and replaces her with Lorelei. He is later hypnotized by Smee to put the Winx in a dangerous situation with Smee's zombie pirates, firing Lorelei when she tries to tell him the Winx are fairies, and reinstating Bloom. Voiced by Nanni Baldini in Italian and Jason Griffith in English, he does not return in Season 2.^{S1 Ep. 10}
- Margot: a judge on the Wow! show. She dislikes all of the presented acts and always votes against them. She has a dog named Puff who sits on her lap. She does not return in Season 2.
- Cliff: a judge on the Wow! show. He tends to be optimistic and votes towards retaining the talent prospects for the finals. He does not return in Season 2.
- Queen: A tinker fairy from the world of dreams, Neverland. In her corrupt form, she manipulates the shadow creatures to kidnap young talented people from Earth in order to steal their talents for her own. After abducting upcoming singer Annabelle, she adopts Annabelle's voice, after revealing she didn't have a voice before she took the Annabelle's voice. In the season 1 finale, she steals Bloom's infinitely strong Dragon Fire powers to fight the other six Winx fairies but is defeated. It is then revealed that she is Tinkerbell from the Peter Pan stories, and that she had fallen in love with Peter Pan, but had left her to go to Earth. In the second season, she summons a particular shadow creature called a "nemesis" based on the dark essence of each of the fairies, again excluding fellow fairy Roxy.
- Smee: He first appears in Episode 10, "Dangerous Waters" as an assistant to the Wow! show, but he uses his powers to hypnotize Ace, as well as control an army of zombie pirates. At the end of the first season, it is revealed he is Mr. Smee from Peter Pan and that he has sided with Captain Hook once again.
- Jim: An elusive man with dark purple hair, who Bloom and Roxy tried to chase down at the start of the series, suspected of being Annabelle's abductor. He has the ability to turn invisible. In the first season, he escapes Annabelle's apartment but drops his pocket watch.^{S1 Ep. 7-8} He later works with Bloom to try to rescue Annabelle. At the end of season 1, it is revealed he is Captain Hook from Peter Pan, and that he was made young by the Queen (Tinkerbell)'s powerful fairy magic. Throughout Season Two, he intended to dominate all of Neverland by getting rid of Tinkerbell and, ultimately, the Winx Club. He had attempted to corrupt the very Heart of Neverland itself by turning it into a flying pirate ship. He is beaten by the Winx Club, Matt and Tinkerbell's combined strength and falls right into a portal to the world of nightmares.
- Gomez: An undercover police detective who works with Evans on the case of Annabelle's abduction. They frequently find ways to spy on the Winx Club. He likes to be casually friendly towards his partner, often thinking of their adventures like dating situations, but doesn't understand why Evans and women detectives, in general, are so serious. Her first name is not known.
- Evans: An undercover police detective who investigates the Winx for the abduction of Annabelle. She is fairly serious, and gets annoyed about Gomez's casual attitude and incompetence; especially of his flirting with her.
- Venomya: A critic that dislikes the musical performances put together by the Winx Club, and tries to write bad reviews. She first appears in season 2, where she has long blond hair. Her true identity is "Baba Yaga the Dark Dame" claiming that there is not enough room for both fairies and witches on Earth.

=== Supporting ===
- Annabelle: a waitress who is recruited as a talent prospect for the Wow! show. She has a beautiful singing voice. Her abduction becomes the main storyline in the first season. In the first two episodes of season 2, she joins the Winx during their performances in London, New York City, and Paris along with her friend Louise. Her hair is now shoulder-length and has some lines on it.
- Crocodile Man: a servant of the Queen who is an anthropomorphic crocodile. He first appears in the New York City episodes, but later returns when the Queen summons him to go after Jim and the Winx. He is based on the crocodile in the Peter Pan stories.
- Lorelei: a blond-haired girl who joins the Winx on the Wow! show as a talent scout when Bloom is fired. She likes to be the center of attention. She and Stella do not get along.^{S1 Ep. 7} In the episode "Dangerous Waters", when she discovers that the Winx are fairies, she tries to tell Ace and the Wow! show but is laughed off and fired.
- The Shaman: a native martial artist who works for the Queen to kidnap talent prospects. He uses a set of stones that give him special powers, including allowing him to disappear in a puff of smoke.
- The Spirit of the World of Dreams: The spiritual manifestation of the world of dreams itself. She summons the Winx Club girls and warns them of the grave danger her world was in, further developing and amplifying their Dreamix abilities into the evolved power of Onyrix.
- Matt Barrie: The only child of Peter Pan, the legendary hero of Neverland. The Winx Club seek to find him so they he can lead them to his long-lost father. He has curly brown hair, and originally lived in London with Wendy Darling and Peter until Peter left. He lives in Paris. Later found by Musa's sound magic, he was teleported to the dream world, where he met the Queen in the forest and expressed his enduring love for her. After Jim/Captain Hook falls into the dark world of nightmares, he rules as King of Neverland alongside his love Tinkerbell.

== Episodes ==
Season	Episodes	Originally aired
1	13	4 November 2016
2	13	16 June 2017

=== Season 1 (2016) ===
No. overall	No. in season	Italian title English title	International release date (Netflix)	Italian air date (Rai Gulp)
1	1	"Il ladro di talenti" "The Talent Thief"	4 November 2016	28 January 2017
The Winx chase down a guy who was seen in one of the latest kidnappings of a talent prospect, but the guy disappears. The Winx then participate in the reality television show Wow! in which they act as talent scouts hoping to audition the next great act. They discover a girl named Annabelle, who works at a cupcake shop and has a pleasant singing voice. To recruit her for the show, the Winx help her boss Louise with making and serving the cupcakes. Annabelle performs in front of the judges and the audience. Suddenly the power is cut, and Annabelle has gone missing.
2	2	"Nuovi poteri" "New Powers"	4 November 2016	29 January 2017
Bloom has a dream where she finds Annabelle in a forest. When they are called by Wow! to find another talent, the Winx split into two groups: Bloom, Flora and Tecna pretend to be sick so they can search for Annabelle, while Stella and Aisha have Musa dress up as their upcoming talent for their Wow! episode. At the Frutti Music Bar, Evans and Gomez interrogate Roxy about Annabelle, and she warns her fellow fairies. They regroup at the club dressing room that showcased Annabelle, and discover one of her earrings. But a mysterious portal transports them to where Annabelle is and they learn that they now have a new fairy transformation called Dreamix. Although they fight off some local monster spirits, Annabelle is unable to enter the portal back to Earth and is instead sent to another location.
3	3	"La leggenda dell'uomo coccodrillo" "The Legend of the Crocodile Man"	4 November 2016	30 January 2017
The Winx's next appearance on Wow! is interrupted by a report from New York City in which a crocodile monster (Crocodile Man) has been spotted near on a boat. Flora senses that a guy named Naoki is connected to this so the Winx girls head to Manhattan to find Naoki, who tries to escape from the girls but then finds himself being pursued by Crocodile Man. The Winx save Naoki and reveal to him that they are fairies.
4	4	"Il mostro sotto la città" "The Monster Under the City"	4 November 2016	31 January 2017
The Winx have found a pocket watch that was dropped by Crocodile Man. They and Naoki try to capture Crocodile Man, but the latter proves to be very strong and elusive. The Winx discover that Crocodile Man is more interested in going after the watch than Naoki. Although Crocodile Man gets the watch and escapes through a portal, Tecna has placed a tracker inside that watch and they learn that Crocodile Man has escaped into the World of Dreams.
5	5	"Cercasi stilista" "Stylist Wanted"	4 November 2016	1 February 2017
Bloom contacts Annabelle and learns that she had found a similar pocket watch dropped by a guy who had broken into her apartment and then escaped. The Winx head to Paris to recruit a fashion design student named Sophie. Sophie is reluctant to join and dislikes Stella's style, so Stella suggests they have a contest to see who has the better style. During the contest, Stella encourages Sophie to design the dress of her dreams. Sophie is invited to have the Winx model her new design at a show. Crocodile Man kidnaps Sophie. Although they defeat Crocodile Man and rescue Sophie, they discover she is acting differently and Bloom gets a vision that the real Sophie is trapped in the World of Dreams.
6	6	"La settimana della moda" "The Fashion Week"	4 November 2016	2 February 2017
The Winx sneak into an exclusive fashion week party to look for the Sophie imposter. Bloom discovers the imposter is a shadow creature, but accidentally falls onto the party's cake, causing much embarrassment. The Winx return to the Paris fashion academy where they recruit office worker Nadine to try becoming a model. Nadine is invited by the fake Sophie to model, but the Winx confront Sophie and a bodyguard at the Eiffel Tower. As punishment for ditching the show, Ace has the Winx girls perform some activities that are not within their natural talents. Although Bloom surprises everyone with her singing, she accidentally knocks Ace's hairpiece off; Ace has had enough of Bloom's shenanigans and fires her.
7	7	"Cuochi in gara" "The Chef Contest"	4 November 2016	3 February 2017
Ace sends a new girl named Lorelei to replace Bloom as a talent scout on the show. The Winx find their next talent prospect, an apprentice chef named Vincenzo who has been trying to make his own creations but refuses to listen to his boss Tony or anyone else for advice. The Winx pair up with each of the participants in the competition as their assistants, and eventually encourage and guide Vincenzo to make the kind of food that he has been dreaming of. Meanwhile, Bloom makes her way to Annabelle's apartment to try to find the watch, but notices Evans is tailing her so she hides from her. Evans eventually finds Bloom and brings her in for questioning.
8	8	"Lo sciamano" "The Shaman"	4 November 2016	4 February 2017
Detective Evans interrogates Bloom and reveals that she has the pocket watch that Bloom is looking for. Bloom tries to shake off Evans and Gomez with the help of Roxy and her dog Arthur while the other five Winx have to bring along Lorelei on the Winxmobile. Their next talent prospect is in Beijing: a kung-fu martial artist named Yu, but she has to face the Shaman in the finals. During the battle, Yu is kidnapped by the Shaman.
9	9	"Sogni in frantumi" "Shattered Dreams"	4 November 2016	5 February 2017
The Winx capture the Shaman, and learn that his master has been controlling the portals to kidnap the talent prospects. However, when Lorelei wants their attention, the Shaman escapes. The Winx head to London to find their next talent prospect: a girl named Madelyn who has been groomed to become a pianist but does not enjoy it. While some of the girls take care of Madelyn's family pugs, the others try to encourage her to follow her real dream. After some Sherlock Holmes-like searching, they find Madelyn in her tree-house and that her real desire is to play rock music on an electric guitar. Note: This episode is named after a song by Johnny Hates Jazz.
10	10	"Acque pericolose" "Dangerous Waters"	4 November 2016	5 February 2017
The Winx head to Santa Monica Pier on the direction of Lorelei's determination to lead the show. A new assistant, Smee, hypnotizes Ace into putting the girls in a parasurfing challenge race with a group of guys called the Sharks. Lorelei tries to follow but her boat breaks down and she is attacked by sharks (actually mind-controlled by Smee). To make things worse, the guy Sharks are actually zombie pirates. Although the Winx defeat the pirates, Lorelei discovers they are fairies and tries to tell Ace. However, Ace and the audience laugh at her, and Ace fires her from Wow! Meanwhile, Bloom and Roxy track down Evans and Gomez when Jim snatches the pocket-watch from them. They pursue Jim and recover the watch, but find it is broken.
11	11	"Ombre sulla neve" "Shadows on the Snow"	4 November 2016	6 February 2017
Jim offers Bloom and Roxy a chance to get the pocket watch repaired. Bloom accepts and goes with him to Switzerland to find the Watchmaker, despite Roxy's reservations. Evans and Gomez follow them. Meanwhile, the other Winx head there to scout a girl named Silke who is trying to win a snowboard jumping competition. But they discover Silke has no competition-level talent for snowboarding.: This is Roxy's last appearance
12	12	"L'orologiaio" "The Watchmaker"	4 November 2016	6 February 2017
The Watchmaker refuses to see Bloom and Jim and locks himself in his home. Bloom and Jim fight Smee's zombie pirates, but are captured and sent through the portal. The other Winx discover that Silke's real talent is repairing mechanical watches and that she is the niece of the Watchmaker. They meet Evans and Gomez and find the pocket watch. After Silke disables the security system, the Watchmaker says he cannot repair the watch as it is magical and runs counter-clockwise, but Silke is able to fix it.
13	13	"La caduta della regina" "The Fall of the Queen"	4 November 2016	7 February 2017
Bloom and Jim are brought to the Queen, who has masterminded the kidnappings of the kids and uses their talents for herself. The other Winx arrive but must navigate through the World of Dreams and battle the Shadow Creatures and the local plant life to get to the Queen, who is a formidable foe with her stolen abilities. Jim frees Bloom, who regains her power and together with the other Winx they defeat the Queen. They free the talents and make it back to the Wow! finale and Ace welcomes Bloom back. In the World of Dreams, Smee swears loyalty to Jim who is revealed to be Captain Hook turned young by the Queen, and who intends on re-conquering Neverland.

=== Season 2 (2017) ===
No. overall	No. in season	Italian title English title	International release date (Netflix)	Italian air date (Rai Gulp)
14	1	"L'isola che non c'è" "Neverland"	16 June 2017	18 June 2017
In the inter-dimensional World of Dreams, Jim and Smee continue to secretly conspire against the Queen while being stalked by shadow creatures. Back on Earth, Bloom, Tecna, and Flora try to keep a performance by Annabelle, Louise, and the other Winx girls from being sabotaged. They meet a woman named Venomya who is a music critic. After driving her away, the Winx are suddenly whisked away to the dream world where they are tasked to help the spirit of the World of Dreams. They receive evolved powers called Onyrix. They aid Jim and Smee against the shadow creatures. Jim explains the background of his situation: he is Captain Hook and the World of Dreams is called Neverland. There was a hero named Peter Pan who left the world and the Queen (Tinkerbell) was so heartbroken she created a world of darkness. The Winx return to Earth where they track down Peter Pan's friend Wendy Darling, who now runs an orphanage in London. One of the shadow monsters absorbs some of Bloom's essence, which Tinkerbell fashions into a dark creature called Vertigo.
15	2	"Il figlio di Peter Pan" "Peter Pan's Son"	16 June 2017	19 June 2017
After finishing their joint tour with Annabelle and Louise, the Winx look over Peter's farewell letter to Wendy in which he asks her to look after their son Matt Barrie. In London, they look for Matt at the place where he worked, but he was fired. Meanwhile, Bloom is haunted repeatedly by illusions of a costumed woman named Vertigo. She is influenced to attack her friends, but is able to break free from the illusion and defeats Vertigo by accepting and embracing the dark parts of herself. But Tinkerbell is not yet done, as she calls forth the evil projection of Musa: Banshee.
16	3	"L'uomo alligatore" "The Alligator Man"	16 June 2017	20 June 2017
The Spirit of the World of Dreams summons the Winx Club and tells them someone close to them is in imminent danger. The Winx split into two groups: Flora, Aisha and Tecna go to the dream world while Stella, Bloom, and Musa continue searching for Matt. Flora, Aisha and Tecna encounter and try to fight off Crocodile Man who had been going after Jim and Smee. The fairies notice that Crocodile Man isn't really attacking back but fleeing and then waiting for them to follow. They eventually learn that Crocodile Man has been leading them to a lair where his brother Alligator Man had been imprisoned. But when they try to free up, they discover the prison is actually a living magical creature, which ends up absorbing them into its sticky goo. Meanwhile, Bloom, Stella, and Musa determine that Jim's constellation map points to landmarks in Paris, so they head there to the brightest landmark of the Cathedral of Notre Dame. Musa splits from the others and succeeds in finding Matt, but she is suddenly attacked by Banshee.
17	4	"Sirene sulla Terra" "Mermaids on Earth"	16 June 2017	21 June 2017
Aisha uses her water magic to free herself, Flora, Tecna, Crocodile Man, and Alligator Man. They tell Jim of their quest to bring back the Queen's light side as Tinker Bell by reuniting her with Peter Pan. Jim agrees, but has no knowledge of Pan's whereabouts either. Back in Paris, Musa is still being attacked by her nemesis Banshee. When Bloom and Stella arrive to support her, Musa realizes that the harmonious chimes of the bells of Notre Dame weaken Banshee, and she rings the bells to defeat Banshee. The Spirit of the World of Dreams summons the Winx and explains that three mermaids were enchanted by the Queen and have headed to Earth. The mermaids were found in Paris and have the ability to charm people.
18	5	"Brividi nella scuola di moda" "Fashion School Thrills"	16 June 2017	22 June 2017
The Winx split up again on two missions. Stella, Tecna and Aisha track down Matt to the fashion school, while Bloom, Flora and Musa try to free Hook's pirates from the shadow creature's traps. At the fashion school, Stella encounters her nemesis, Obscura, who traps her in a world of isolation and has her re-live her innermost fears of being alone and verbally bullied by everyone.
19	6	"La ragazza del sogni" "The Girl in the Stars"	16 June 2017	23 June 2017
Bloom, Flora and Musa continue to battle the shadow creatures that have been holding Jim's pirate crew. Flora uses her plant powers to overwhelm the Queen's control of the area and the three Winx fairies then combine powers to free the pirates. Stella, Aisha and Tecna chase Matt's hooded abductor all over Paris. They are joined by the other Winx and the pirates, the last group at first just want to take it easy and rest, but later team up to help the Winx. When they tell Matt about their mission, Matt reveals that he has been looking for a girl of his dreams, but then Matt is suddenly teleported away.
20	7	"Il fiore più bello" "A Flower in the Snow"	16 June 2017	24 June 2017
In the World of Dreams, the Queen is approached by Matt, who recognizes her from the stars and that he had been searching for her his whole life. Entranced by her beauty, he promises to find the loveliest of flowers as proof of his enduring love for her. Refusing to let her weakness get the better of her, the Queen calls Flora's inner nemesis, Stoney, using the non-living material of stone. Flora and Matt work together to defeat her nemesis Stoney by using her own dark magic against her. Matt thanks Flora for helping him and joins the Winx Club as a friend. However, Aisha refuses to have his "big ideas" around and storms off. From a distance, she is watched by one of the Queen's shadow monsters.
21	8	"Giglio Tigrato" "Tiger Lily"	16 June 2017	25 June 2017
Despite Tiger Lily's visions of a heroic Matt, Aisha struggles with his warrior training, which is soon put to the test by the Queen's monsters.
22	9	"La spada dell'eroe" "A Hero Will Come"	16 June 2017	26 June 2017
After a battle with Aisha's innermost nemesis, Sinka, the Winx Club manage to reunite Matt and Wendy and go undercover to look for Peter Pan's mystical sword in the home of an art collector named Sebastian.
23	10	"Trappola tecnomagica" "Technomagic Trap"	16 June 2017	27 June 2017
Tecna fights her inner nemesis, Virus, in the art vault. Armed with his father's mystical sword, a transformed Matt joins the Winx Club and Jim in the World of Dreams, ready to stand against the Queen.
24	11	"La vendetta di Jim" "Jim's Revenge"	16 June 2017	28 June 2017
As the Winx band deals with an onstage earthquake, Jim, Matt, and the pirate army try to beat back the shadow monsters and breach the Queen's wall.
25	12	"Vecchi amici e nuovi nemici" "Old Friends and New Enemies"	16 June 2017	29 June 2017
Faced with Jim's betrayal, Matt tries to flee by boat, but is waylaid by the three mermaids. On Earth, the banished Winx Club fairies, along with Tiger Lily and the Shaman, battle Jim's pirate army.
26	13	"Il ritorno di Campanellino" "Tinkerbell Is Back"	16 June 2017	30 June 2017
In the cliffhanger finale, the Winx club fight alongside Matt and Tinkerbell to foil the plans of Jim, better known as Captain Hook. Finally seeing the light, Tinkerbell reverts to her pure form. Back on Earth, the Winx Club's doubles are rocking the concert. Just as the real Winx Club are planning to take their place, Vermonya shines a light on the six girls and reveals to the audience the Winx's counterparts. In a turn of events, news outlets all across the world watch the chaos unfold live. Among the revelation of the Winx Club as fairies, Vermonya is revealed to be the one who was sabotaging their concerts; she also reveals her true identity as a witch called "Baba Yaga, the Dark Dame" who claims that there is not enough room for fairies and witches on Earth.

== Production ==
In September 2014, as part of its efforts to increase kids' programming, it was announced that Netflix had ordered from Rainbow two seasons of World of Winx, each comprising 13 22-minute episodes. The premise of the show is that the "girls embark on an undercover journey all around the world looking for talented kids in art, sports, music and science."

Originally slated to premiere in early 2016, the series was delayed until later that year, eventually premiering in 4 November as a Netflix original series. At the Licensing Expo in Las Vegas in 2016, it was revealed that the storyline involved a Talent Thief that had been capturing children. The second season was released on Netflix on 16 June 2017. The series was not renewed for a third season, ending the show on an unresolved cliffhanger.

== Reception ==
Ella Anders, a regular reviewer of magical girl-themed shows on BSC Kids, had low expectations on the series given that the more recent seasons of Winx Club were shells of their original, but said "So it was all that much stranger when I realized just how good World of Winx actually is". She liked that the series made the story meaningful. "Every moment counts, the story is a good one that is tightly woven together. The humour and heart shines. The girls are using their magic wisely and creatively." She especially liked that the Winx girls were "back to their old selves".

== Works cited ==
- "Ep." is shortened form for episode and refers to an episode number in World of Winx.
