= Perla Liberatori =

Italian voice actress

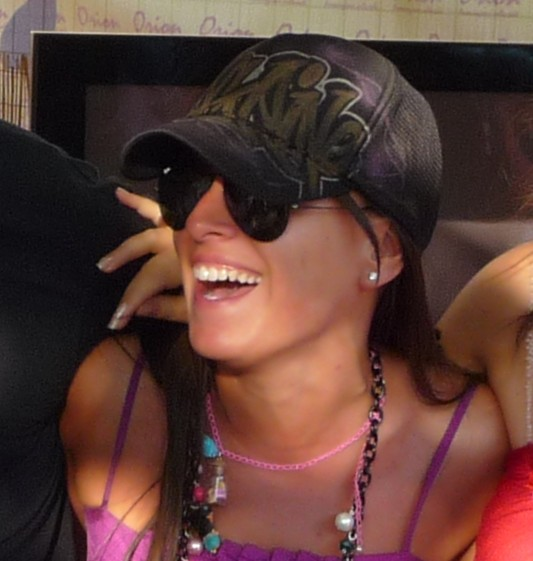
- Liberatori in 2010
- Born: November 10, 1981 (age 44); Rome, Italy
- Occupations: Voice actress, dubbing director

Perla Liberatori (born November 10, 1981) is an Italian voice actress and dubbing director.

== Biography ==
Niece of actors Francesca and Marco Guadagno, Liberatori's career began when she was 5 years old. In 1995 she acted alongside Massimo Dapporto in the TV film Una bambina di troppo, shot in Paris and directed by Damiano Damiani.

Liberatori is known for dubbing the voice of Stella in the popular fantasy animated series Winx Club, where she also voiced Chatta and Zing. She also dubbed Celia Hills in the Italian-language version of Inazuma Eleven and is known for dubbing over many Hollywood actresses, such as Hilary Duff and Christina Ricci, in Italian.

== Voice work ==
=== Animation ===
- Stella, Chatta, Zing, and Sonna in Winx Club, Stella, Chatta, and Zing in Winx Club: The Secret of the Lost Kingdom, Stella and Chatta in Winx Club 3D: Magical Adventure, Chatta in PopPixie, Stella in Winx Club: The Mystery of the Abyss, World of Winx
- Cicà in I Roteò e la magia dello specchio
- Ziba in I Lampaclima e l'isola misteriosa
- Potipoti in Gli Animotosi nella terra di Nondove
- Girl #1 in Rat-Man (episode 1.2)
- Sciangri in Gli Smile and Go e il braciere di fuoco
- Idrí in Gli Skatenini e le dune dorate
- Sara in Teen Days
- Matilde in Slash://
- Jo in Spike Team
- Blue Fairy in Pinocchio and Friends
- Nunzy in I Saurini e i viaggi del meteorite nero
- Zampacorta in Lampadino e Caramella nel MagiRegno degli Zampa
- Fedora in Star Key

==== Dubbing ====
- Young Nala in The Lion King
- Baby Bug in Thumbelina
- Bubbles in The Powerpuff Girls, The Powerpuff Girls Movie, Powerpuff Girls Z
- Melody (speaking voice) in The Little Mermaid II: Return to the Sea
- Kaname Chidori in Full Metal Panic! and Full Metal Panic? Fumoffu
- Nagisa Misumi/Cure Black in Futari wa Pretty Cure, Futari wa Pretty Cure Max Heart, Futari wa Pretty Cure Max Heart the Movie
- Sarah in Ed, Edd n Eddy and Ed, Edd n Eddy's Big Picture Show
- Nisroch, Catnip, Lala and Bastet in Devichil
- Bebe Stevens and blonde girl (episode 2.12) in South Park (1st Italian dub)
- Senior Witch in Kiki's Delivery Service (1st Italian dub)
- Iridessa in Tinker Bell, Tinker Bell and the Lost Treasure, Tinker Bell and the Great Fairy Rescue
- Andrina in The Little Mermaid: Ariel's Beginning
- Heidi Montag, Penelope and Lacey Chabert in Family Guy
- Mai in Avatar: The Last Airbender
- She in She and Her Cat
- Misha in Transformers: Energon
- Lizzie in Codename: Kids Next Door
- Mammoth Mutt in Krypto the Superdog
- Sophie Casterwill in Huntik: Secrets & Seekers
- Jinx (1st voice) in Teen Titans
- Yumi Yoshimura in Hi Hi Puffy AmiYumi
- Judy Shepherd in Jumanji
- Celia Hills in Inazuma Eleven
- Jean Crandall in Teamo Supremo
- Little Wendy in Between the Lions
- Edmond in Rock-A-Doodle
- Scout the Green Dog in LeapFrog
- Tickety Tock in Blue's Clues
- Ginger in TeachTown
- Kai-Lan in Ni Hao, Kai-Lan
- Tiff Crust in My Life as a Teenage Robot
- Shayla in Tomodachi Life: The TV Series
- Lotta in Harvey Street Kids
- Cozybory in Noonbory and the Super 7
- Jessica Phillips in Sarah Lee Jones
- Princess Lolly in Candy Land: The Great Lollipop Adventure
- Andy Arlington in Maya & Miguel
- Billy Bevel in Rolie Polie Olie
- Sam Sparks in Cloudy with a Chance of Meatballs
- Milly Thompson in Trigun
- Hikaru Amano in Martian Successor Nadesico
- Ferro in Gunslinger Girl
- Karin Hanazono in Kamichama Karin
- Naru Narusegawa in Love Hina
- Maho Minami in BECK: Mongolian Chop Squad
- Rika Sena in Kare Kano
- Chiaki Nakahara in Dai-Guard
- Nanami Tenchi in UFO Baby
- Tomoko Nomura in Great Teacher Onizuka
- Rie Petoriyacowa in Agent Aika
- Courtney Martin in Glenn Martin, DDS
- Natsue Horikawa in Boys Be...
- Yuki Nagato in The Melancholy of Haruhi Suzumiya
- Flora in Babar: The Movie, Babar
- Amu Hinamori in Shugo Chara!
- Hiroko Asahina in RahXephon
- Akemi in Saikano
- Rika Nonaka in Digimon Tamers
- Nagi Kirima in Boogiepop Phantom
- Saz Higgins in Brain Powerd
- Hyatt in Excel Saga
- Red Puckett in Hoodwinked!
- Mindy in The SpongeBob SquarePants Movie
- Morgan le Fay in Ah! My Goddess: The Movie
- Louise Belcher in Bob's Burgers
- Jo in Spike Team
- Sara in Teen Days
- Lain in Serial Experiments Lain
- Olivia in Oggy and the Cockroaches
- Bobby Sue in ChalkZone
- Rudy Tabootie in Oh Yeah! Cartoons

=== Live action shows and movies ===
==== Dubbing ====
- Brooke Davis in One Tree Hill
- Lizzie McGuire in Lizzie McGuire and The Lizzie McGuire Movie
- Sabrina Spellman in Sabrina the Teenage Witch
- Olivia Kendall (2nd voice) in The Cosby Show
- Griet in Girl with a Pearl Earring
- Natasha 'Nat' Wilson in Octane
- Lane Daniels in Beauty & the Briefcase
- Samantha "Sam" Montgomery in A Cinderella Story
- Charisse Dolittle in Dr. Dolittle
- Holly Hamilton in The Perfect Man
- Annie 'Nanny' Braddock in The Nanny Diaries
- Mary Boleyn in The Other Boleyn Girl
- Tanzania "Tanzie" Marchetta in Material Girls
- Kat Adams in Ace Lightning
- Sally in Mike's Super Short Show
- Wendy Greenhut in College Road Trip
- Purslane Will in A Love Song for Bobby Long
- Molly Pruitt in Home Alone 3
- Lindsay Gardner in The O.C.
- Grace Bailey in Tart
- Mary "Mouse" Bedford in Lost and Delirious
- Wednesday Addams in The Addams Family and Addams Family Values
- Lisa Atwood in The Saddle Club
- Emily Parker in Microsoap
- Paris Geller (2nd voice) and Janet Billing in Gilmore Girls
- Sandra Volkom in Ghosts of Girlfriends Past
- Jackie Cook in Veronica Mars
- Charlie Chiemingo in ER
- Angela Crabtree in The Troop
- Jessica Hamby in True Blood
- Felicity King in Road to Avonlea
- Jane Margolis in Breaking Bad
- Kelly Driscoll in Piranha 3D
- Yara Greyjoy in Game of Thrones
