= Box Office 3D: The Filmest of Films =

2011 Italian comedy film

- Film poster
- Italian: Box Office 3D: Il film dei film
- Directed by: Ezio Greggio
- Written by: Ezio Greggio; Fausto Brizzi; Marco Martani; Rudy De Luca; Steve Haberman
- Starring: Ezio Greggio; Maurizio Mattioli; Enzo Salvi; Antonello Fassari; Biagio Izzo; Anna Falchi; Giorgia Würth; Gianfranco Jannuzzo; Rocco Ciarmoli; Cristiano Militello; Gigi Proietti
- Cinematography: Claudio Zamarion
- Edited by: Valentina Mariani
- Music by: Aldo De Scalzi; Pivio
- Release dates: 30 August 2011 (68th Venice International Film Festival); 9 September 2011 (Italy)
- Running time: 102 minutes
- Country: Italy
- Language: Italian

Box Office 3D: The Filmest of Films (Italian: Box Office 3D: Il film dei film) is a 2011 Italian parody film co-written, directed, co-produced by, and starring Ezio Greggio.

The film premiered out of competition at the 68th Venice International Film Festival on 30 August 2011. Parodies include The Da Vinci Code, The Godfather and gangster films, Twilight, slasher films, Gladiator, Fast & Furious, Grease, James Bond films, Das Boot, Zorro, Avatar, Harry Potter films and The Lord of the Rings trilogy.

== Cast ==
- Ezio Greggio
- Maurizio Mattioli
- Enzo Salvi
- Antonello Fassari
- Biagio Izzo
- Anna Falchi
- Giorgia Würth
- Gianfranco Jannuzzo
- Rocco Ciarmoli
- Cristiano Militello
- Gigi Proietti
- Max Pisu
- Alessandro Bianchi
- Mario Zucca
- Daniele Giulietti
- Gianni Fantoni
- Michelangelo Pulci
- Sergio Solli
- Mariano Rigillo
- Franco Neri
- Riccardo Miniggio
- Domitilla D'Amico
- Aldo Biscardi as Mago Biscardo
- Luca Giurato as Leatherface
- Bruno Pizzul as himself
- Cesara Buonamici as herself
- Gina Lollobrigida as herself
