= Domitilla D'Amico =

Italian actress

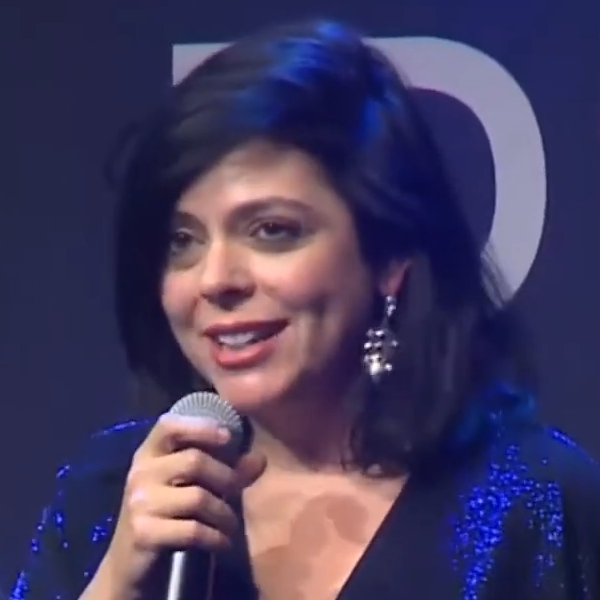
- D'Amico in 2017
- Born: 5 September 1982 (age 43); Rome, Italy
- Occupations: Actress; voice actress; dubbing director
- Years active: 1986–present
- Spouse: Marco Infussi Giorgi (m. 2010)
- Children: 2
- Father: Arnaldo D'Amico

Domitilla D'Amico (born 5 September 1982) is an Italian actress who works primarily in film and television dubbing.

== Early life ==
D'Amico was born in Rome on 5 September 1982. Her mother's side is half-French. Her father Arnaldo works as a professor of electrical engineering at University of Rome Tor Vergata.

== Career ==
Her career began in 1986, at the age of four, when she acted alongside Ferruccio Amendola in an advertisement for laundry detergent. She made her debut as a voice actress at the age of eight, performing in Federico Fellini's last film The Voice of the Moon, with the director even portraying her in drawings.

In her animated roles, D'Amico voiced Lucky as a teenager in the animated film Lucky and Zorba, as well as Tecna, Piff, Glim, and Livy in the Winx franchise, also providing the Italian-dubbed voice of Daphne Blake in the Scooby-Doo franchise, Korra in Legend of Korra, and Kiki in Kiki's Delivery Service. Many of her animated voice credits overlap with characters voiced by Grey DeLisle in English.

D'Amico is a recurring voice dubber for live action roles played by Margot Robbie, Emma Stone, Scarlett Johansson, and Kirsten Dunst; she has also dubbed Eva Green, Léa Seydoux, Emily Blunt, and Mandy Moore in the Italian dubs.

She has also acted in television shows and the film Box Office 3D: The Filmest of Films (2011).

In 2003, D'Amico took part in a stage performance of Goethe's Stella and in 2014 she played Ophelia in a production of Shakespeare's Hamlet staged in Rome. Two years later, she also appeared opposite Francesco Carnelutti in the short film Non temere, part of a larger public awareness campaign for Alzheimer's by Rai Cinema.

In 2019, D'Amico voiced the Fairy with Turquoise Hair as an adult, portrayed by Marine Vacth, in both the Italian and English version of Matteo Garrone's film, Pinocchio.

== Filmography ==
=== Cinema ===
- Box Office 3D: The Filmest of Films (2011)

=== Television ===
- Lo zio d'America – TV Series (2002)
- The Teacher – TV series, episodes 1x04, 3x06 (2005, 2008)
- La ladra – TV Series, episode 1x11 (2010)

=== Short films ===
- Non temere (2016)
- Marriage Material (2018)
- Daisy (2022)

== Voice roles ==
=== Live action ===
Year of original	Title	Role	Original actor	Ref
1990	La voce della luna	Minor characters		
1994	Little Women	Amy March	Kirsten Dunst	
1995	Just Cause	Katie Armstrong	Scarlett Johansson	
1997	Law & Order	Alison Martin	Emmy Rossum	
1998	The Horse Whisperer	Grace MacLean	Scarlett Johansson	
1999	For Love of the Game	Heather Aubrey	Jena Malone	
1999	American Beauty	Angela Hayes	Mena Suvari	
1999	A Walk on the Moon	Allison Kantrowitz	Anna Paquin	
2000	Finding Forrester	Claire	Anna Paquin	
2001	Buffalo Soldiers	Robyn Lee	Anna Paquin	
2001	An American Rhapsody	Suzanne Sandor (age 15)	Scarlett Johansson	
2001	Sugar & Spice	Kansas "The Rebel" Hill	Mena Suvari	
2002	Sonny	Carol	Mena Suvari	
2002	A Walk to Remember	Jamie Sullivan	Mandy Moore	
2002	25th Hour	Mary D'Annunzio	Anna Paquin	
2002	Spider-Man	Mary Jane Watson	Kirsten Dunst	
2002	The Dangerous Lives of Altar Boys	Margie Flynn	Jena Malone	
2002	Crossroads	Kit	Zoë Saldaña	
2002	About a Boy	Ellie	Natalia Tena	
2003	Love Actually	Juliet	Keira Knightley	
2003	The Dreamers	Isabelle	Eva Green	
2004	Spider-Man 2	Mary Jane Watson	Kirsten Dunst	
2004	Wimbledon	Lizzie Bradbury	Kirsten Dunst	
2004	Trauma	Charlotte	Mena Suvari	
2004	Law & Order: Special Victims Unit	Tandi McCain	Amanda Seyfried	
2004	Chasing Liberty	Anna Foster	Mandy Moore	
2004	Saved!	Hilary Faye Stockard	Mandy Moore	
2005	Romance & Cigarettes	Baby Murder	Mandy Moore	
2005	Nine Lives	Samantha	Amanda Seyfried	
2005	House	Pam	Amanda Seyfried	
2005	Domino	Kimmie	Mena Suvari	
2005	Rumor Has It	Annie Huttinger	Mena Suvari	
2005	Elizabethtown	Claire Colburn	Kirsten Dunst	
2006	Marie Antoinette	Marie Antoinette	Kirsten Dunst	
2006	ATL			
2006	Justice	Ann Diggs	Amanda Seyfried	
2006	Click	Samantha (27 years old)	Katie Cassidy	
2006	Factory Girl	Richie Berlin	Mena Suvari	
2006	American Dreamz	Sally Kendoo	Mandy Moore	
2007	Because I Said So	Milly	Mandy Moore	
2007	Spider-Man 3	Mary Jane Watson	Kirsten Dunst	
2007	The Jane Austen Book Club	Prudie	Emily Blunt	
2007	Harry Potter and the Order of the Phoenix	Tonks	Natalie Tena	
2007	The Messengers			
2007	In the Valley of Elah	Angie	Zoe Kazan	
2008	Revolutionary Road	Maureen Grube	Zoe Kazan	
2008	Never Back Down	Baja Miller	Amber Heard	
2008	How to Lose Friends & Alienate People	Alison Olsen	Kirsten Dunst	
2008	Taken	Amanda	Katie Cassidy	
2008	The Ruins	Amy	Jena Malone	
2009	Crossing Over	Claire Shephard	Alice Eve	
2009	Ghosts of Girlfriends Past	Allison Vandermeersh	Emma Stone	
2009	Harry Potter and the Half-Blood Prince	Tonks	Natalia Tena	
2009	Avatar	Neytiri	Zoë Saldaña	
2009	An Education	Jenny	Carey Mulligan	
2009	It's Complicated	Gabby Adler	Zoe Kazan	
2009	He's Just Not That Into You	Anna	Scarlett Johansson	
2010	Iron Man 2	Natasha Romanoff/Black Widow	Scarlett Johansson	
2010	All Good Things	Katie McCarthy	Kirsten Dunst	
2010	Never Let Me Go	Ruth C	Keira Knightley	
2010	Harry Potter and the Deathly Hallows – Part 1	Tonks	Natalia Tena	
2010	Easy A	Olive Penderghast	Emma Stone	
2010	The Book of Eli	Solara	Mila Kunis	
2010	Black Swan	Lily / Black Swan / Odile	Mila Kunis	
2010	The Wolfman	Gwen Conliffe	Emily Blunt	
2010	Gulliver's Travels	Princess Mary	Emily Blunt	
2011	Salmon Fishing in the Yemen	Harriet Chetwode-Talbot	Emily Blunt	
2011	Melancholia	Justine	Kirsten Dunst	
2011	Perfect Sense	Susan	Eva Green	
2011	Margaret	Lisa Cohen	Anna Paquin	
2011	Shame	Sissy Sulliavn	Carey Mulligan	
2011	Monte Carlo	Emma Perkins	Katie Cassidy	
2011	Crazy, Stupid, Love	Hannah Weaver	Emma Stone	
2011	Friends with Benefits	Kayla	Emma Stone	
2011	The Help	Eugenia "Skeeter" Phelan	Emma Stone	
2011	The Rum Diary	Chenault	Amber Heard	
2011	Colombiana	Cataleya Restrepo / Valerie Phillips / Jennifer	Zoë Saldaña	
2011	Mission: Impossible – Ghost Protocol	Sabine Moureau	Léa Seydoux	
2011-2019	Shameless	Fiona Gallagher	Emmy Rossum	
2012	Sister	Louise	Léa Seydoux	
2012	The Raven	Emily Hampton	Alice Eve	
2012	The Avengers	Natasha Romanoff/Black Widow	Scarlett Johansson	
2012	Hitchcock	Janet Leigh	Scarlett Johansson	
2012	Arthur Newman	Mike	Emily Blunt	
2012	The Words	Dora Jansen	Zoë Saldaña	
2012	Ruby Sparks	Ruby Tiffany Sparks	Zoe Kazan	
2012	Dark Shadows	Angie Bouchard	Eva Green	
2012	The Dark Knight Rises	Selina Kyle / Catwoman	Anne Hathaway	
2012	Bachelorette	Regan Crawford	Kirsten Dunst	
2012	On the Road	Camille Moriarty	Kirsten Dunst	
2012	Upside Down	Eden Moore	Kirsten Dunst	
2013	Anchorman 2: The Legend Continues	El Trousias Maiden of the Clouds	Kirsten Dunst	
2013	The Wolf of Wall Street	Naomi Lapaglia	Margot Robbie	
2013	Machete Kills	"Miss San Antonio" Blanca Vasquez	Amber Heard	
2013	Gangster Squad	Grace Faraday	Emma Stone	
2013	Movie 43	Veronica	Emma Stone	
2013	Kill for Me	Amanda Rowe	Katie Cassidy	
2013	Cold Comes the Night	Chloe	Alice Eve	
2013	Star Trek Into Darkness	Dr. Carol Marcus	Alice Eve	
2013	The Hunger Games: Catching Fire	Johanna Mason	Jena Malone	
2013	Inside Llewyn Davis	Jean Berkey	Carey Mulligan	
2013	Beautiful Creatures	Ridley Duchannes	Emmy Rossum	
2013	Blue Is the Warmest Colour	Emma	Léa Seydoux	
2014	The Grand Budapest Hotel	Clotilde	Léa Seydoux	
2014	Beauty and the Beast	Belle	Léa Seydoux	
2014	The Two Faces of January	Colette MacFarland	Kirsten Dunst	
2014	Into the Woods	Baker's Wife	Emily Blunt	
2014	3 Days to Kill	Vivi Delay	Amber Heard	
2014	Interstellar	Dr. Amelia Brand	Anne Hathaway	
2014	Song One	Franny Ellis	Anne Hathaway	
2014	The Hunger Games: Mockingjay – Part 1	Johanna Mason	Jena Malone	
2014	Magic in the Moonlight	Sophie Baker	Emma Stone	
2014	The Angriest Man in Brooklyn	Dr. Sharon Gill	Mila Kunis	
2014	Captain America: The Winter Soldier	Natasha Romanoff/Black Widow	Scarlett Johansson	
2014	White Bird in a Blizzard	Eve Connors	Eva Green	
2014	300: Rise of an Empire	Artemisia	Eva Green	
2014-2016	Penny Dreadful	Vanessa Ives	Eva Green	
2015	Avengers: Age of Ultron	Natasha Romanoff/Black Widow	Scarlett Johansson	
2015	Fifty Shades of Grey	Mia Grey	Rita Ora	
2015	Southpaw	Maria Escobar	Rita Ora	
2015	The Hunger Games: Mockingjay – Part 2	Johanna Mason	Jena Malone	
2015	Irrational Man	Jill Pollard	Emma Stone	
2015	Focus	Jess Barrett	Margot Robbie	
2015	Suite Française	Celine	Margot Robbie	
2015	Z for Zachariah	Ann Burden	Margot Robbie	
2015	The Intern	Jules	Anne Hathaway	
2015	The Lobster	Loner Leader	Léa Seydoux	
2015	Magic Mike XXL	Zoe	Amber Heard	
2015	The Danish Girl	Ulla Poulsen	Amber Heard	
2015	Fargo	Peggy Blumquist	Kirsten Dunst	
2016	Miss Peregrine's Home for Peculiar Children	Miss Alma LeFay Peregrine	Eva Green	
2016	La La Land	Mia Dolan	Emma Stone	
2016	Collateral Beauty	Amy / "Love"	Kiera Knightley	
2016	Midnight Special	Sarah Tomlin	Kirsten Dunst	
2016	Hidden Figures	Vivian Mitchell	Kirsten Dunst	
2016	Lady Macbeth	Katherine Lester	Florence Pugh	
2016	Misconduct	Charlotte Cahill	Alice Eve	
2016	The Legend of Tarzan	Jane Porter	Margot Robbie	
2016	Whiskey Tango Foxtrot	Tanya Vanderpoel	Margot Robbie	
2016	Suicide Squad	Dr. Harleen Quinzel / Harley Quinn	Margot Robbie	
2016	Fifty Shades of Black			
2016	It's Only the End of the World	Suzanne	Léa Seydoux	
2016	Captain America: Civil War	Natasha Romanoff/Black Widow	Scarlett Johansson	
2017	Thor: Ragnarok	Natasha Romanoff/Black Widow	Scarlett Johansson	
2017	Ghost in the Shell	Major Mira Killian / Motoko Kusanagi	Scarlett Johansson	
2017	Rough Night	Jessica "Jess" Thayer	Scarlett Johansson	
2017	Based on a True Story	Elle	Eva Green	
2017	The Beguiled	Miss Edwina Morrow	Kirsten Dunst	
2017	Twin Peaks	Becky Burnett	Amanda Seyfried	
2017	A Bad Moms Christmas	Amy Redmond Mitchell	Mila Kunis	
2017	The Big Sick	Emily Gardner	Zoe Kazan	
2017	Goodbye Christopher Robin	Daphne Milne	Margot Robbie	
2017	I, Tonya	Tonya Harding	Margot Robbie	
2018	Terminal	Annie/Bonnie	Margot Robbie	
2018	Mary Queen of Scots	Queen Elizabeth I	Margot Robbie	
2018	The Favourite	Abigail Hill	Emma Stone	
2018	Maniac	Annie Landsberg	Emma Stone	
2018	Mary Poppins Returns	Mary Poppins	Emily Blunt	
2018	Ocean's 8	Daphne Kluger	Anne Hathaway	
2018	The Spy Who Dumped Me	Audrey Stockman	Mila Kunis	
2018	Wildlife	Jeanette Brinson	Carey Mulligan	
2018	A Futile and Stupid Gesture	Kathryn Walker	Emmy Rossum	
2018	Fifty Shades Freed	Mia Grey	Rita Ora	
2018	Isle of Dogs	Nutmeg	Scarlett Johansson	
2018	Avengers: Infinity War	Natasha Romanoff/Black Widow	Scarlett Johansson	
2019	Captain Marvel	Natasha Romanoff/Black Widow	Scarlett Johansson	
2019	Avengers: Endgame	Natasha Romanoff/Black Widow	Scarlett Johansson	
2019	Marriage Story	Nicole Barber	Scarlett Johansson	
2019	Jojo Rabbit	Rosie Betzler	Scarlett Johansson	
2019	On Becoming a God in Central Florida	Krystal Stubbs	Kirsten Dunst	
2019	Fighting with My Family	Saraya "Paige" Bevis	Florence Pugh	
2019	Midsommar	Dani	Florence Pugh	
2019	Serenity	Karen Zariakas	Anne Hathaway	
2019	Dark Waters	Sarah Barlage Bilott	Anne Hathaway	
2019	Midway	Anne Best	Mandy Moore	
2019	Pinocchio	Fairy with Turquoise Hair	Marine Vacth	Original version and English dub
2019	Once Upon a Time in Hollywood	Sharon Tate	Margot Robbie	
2019	Bombshell	Kayla Pospisil	Margot Robbie	
2020	Birds of Prey	Dr. Harleen Quinzel / Harley Quinn	Margot Robbie	
2020	You Should Have Left	Susanna	Amanda Seyfried	
2020	Mank	Marion Davies	Amanda Seyfried	
2020	Promising Young Woman	Cassie Thomas	Carrie Mulligan	
2021	Black Widow	Natasha Romanoff/Black Widow	Scarlett Johansson	
2021	The Suicide Squad	Dr. Harleen Quinzel / Harley Quinn	Margot Robbie	
2021	Cruella	Estella / Cruella	Emma Stone	
2021	The French Dispatch	Simone	Léa Seydoux	
2021	Locked Down	Linda	Anne Hathaway	

=== Animation ===
Year(s)	Title	Role	Notes
1992	Frosty Returns	Holly DeCarlo	Italian dub
1992-1997	Sailor Moon (Viz Media dub)	Sailor Moon and Sailor Jupiter	Italian dub
1993-2015	VeggieTales	Petunia Rhubarb	Italian dub
1996-2006	Blue's Clues	Cinnamon	Italian dub
1997-2001	Recess	Ashley Funicello Spinelli	Italian dub
1997-2010	King of the Hill	Luanne Platter	Italian dub
1998	Lucky and Zorba	Lucky (teenager)	
1998-1999	Kare Kano	Kano Miyazawa	Italian dub
1998-2004	Rolie Polie Olie	Zowie Polie	Italian dub
1999	Cardcaptor Sakura: The Movie'	Sakura Kinomoto	Italian dub
1999-2000	Rayman: The Animated Series	Betina	Italian dub
2000	Love Hina	Mitsune "Kitsune" Konno	Italian dub
2000-2002	UFO Baby	Mikan Yamamura	Italian dub
2000-2004	The Weekenders	Lor McQuarrie	Italian dub
2000-2005	Oobi	Uma	Italian dub
2000-2010	Between the Lions	Scot and Dot	Italian dub
2001	Recess: School's Out	Ashley Funicello Spinelli	Italian dub
2001	Jimmy Neutron: Boy Genius	Libby Folfax	Italian dub
2001	Lady and the Tramp II: Scamp's Adventure	Angel	Italian dub
2001-2004	Stanley	Elsie the Cat	Italian dub
2002	Kiki's Delivery Service	Kiki and Ursula	Italian dub
2002-?	Sarah Lee Jones	Sarah Lee Jones	Italian dub
2002-2003	The Fairly OddParents	Veronica	Italian dub
2002-2003	Transformers: Armada	Alexis	Italian dub
2002-2006	What's New, Scooby-Doo?	Daphne Blake	Italian dub
2002-2007	Kim Possible	Bonnie Rockwaller	Italian dub
2002-2008	ChalkZone	Terry Bouffant	Italian dub
2002-2008	Codename: Kids Next Door	Numbuh 86 / Fanny Fulbright	Italian dub
2003	Recess: Taking the Fifth Grade	Ashley Funicello Spinelli	Italian dub
2003	Recess: All Growed Down	Ashley Funicello Spinelli	Italian dub
2003-2005	Sonic X	Rouge the Bat	Italian dub
2003-2009	My Life as a Teenage Robot	Vega	Italian dub
2004	Transformers: Energon	Alexis	Italian dub
2004	I Roteò e la magia dello specchio	Berta	
2004-2007	Maya & Miguel	Maya Santos	Italian dub
2004-2009	Winx Club	Tecna, Piff, Glim, Livy	
2005	Gli Animotosi nella terra di Nondove	Fofí	
2005	Paradise Kiss	Yukari "Caroline" Hayasaka	Italian dub
2005	Chicken Little	Foxy Loxy	Italian dub
2005-2007	American Dragon: Jake Long	Sara	Italian dub
2005-2008	Eppur si muove	Lea	
2005-2008	Avatar: The Last Airbender	Azula	Italian dub
2006	I Lampaclima e l'isola misteriosa	Palli	
2006	Haruhi Suzumiya	Haruhi Suzumiya	Italian dub
2006	Scooby-Doo! Pirates Ahoy!	Daphne Blake	Italian dub
2006	Happy Feet	Gloria	Italian dub
2006-2007	Nana	Reira Serizawa	Italian dub
2006-2007	Code Geass: Lelouch of the Rebellion	Kallen Stadtfeld	Italian dub
2006-2008	Shaggy & Scooby-Doo Get a Clue!	Daphne Blake	Italian dub
2006-2009	American Dad!	Debbie	Italian dub
2007	Chill Out, Scooby-Doo!	Daphne Blake	Italian dub
2007	Winx Club: The Secret of the Lost Kingdom	Tecna, Piff, Livy	
2007	Gli Skatenini e le dune dorate	Corry	
2007	Gli Smile and Go e il braciere di fuoco	Puffete	
2007	Gli Straspeed a Crazy World	Puffete	
2007	Ratatouille	Colette Tatou	Italian dub
2008	Code Geass: Lelouch of the Rebellion R2	Kallen Stadtfeld	Italian dub
2008	Nabari no Ou	Kazuho Amatatsu	Italian dub
2008	Scooby-Doo! and the Goblin King	Daphne Blake	Italian dub
2008	The Tale of Despereaux	Miggery "Mig" Sow	Italian dub
2008-2009	The Spectacular Spider-Man	Mary Jane Watson	Italian dub
2009	Scooby-Doo! and the Samurai Sword	Daphne Blake	Italian dub
2009	Cloudy with a Chance of Meatballs	Sam Sparks	Italian dub
2009	Haruhi Suzumiya	Haruhi Suzumiya	Italian dub
2009	The Princess and the Frog	Tiana	Italian dub
2010	Winx Club 3D: Magical Adventure	Tecna, Piff, Livy	
2010	Scooby-Doo! Abracadabra-Doo	Daphne Blake	Italian dub
2010	Scooby-Doo! Camp Scare	Daphne Blake	Italian dub
2010-2013	Scooby-Doo! Mystery Incorporated	Daphne Blake	Italian dub
2011	Batman: The Brave and the Bold	Daphne Blake	Italian dub
2011	Scooby-Doo! Legend of the Phantosaur	Daphne Blake	Italian dub
2011	00 - Zero Zero	Mother	
2011	PopPixie	Glim	
2011-2019	Winx Club	Tecna, Piff, Glim, Livy	
2012	Scooby-Doo! Music of the Vampire	Daphne Blake	Italian dub
2012	Scooby-Doo! Spooky Games	Daphne Blake	Italian dub
2012	Scooby-Doo! Haunted Holidays	Daphne Blake	Italian dub
2012	Big Top Scooby-Doo!	Daphne Blake	Italian dub
2012-2013	Total Drama	Zoey	Italian dub
2012-2014	The Legend of Korra	Korra	Italian dub
2012-2015	Brickleberry	Amber	Italian dub
2013	Cloudy with a Chance of Meatballs 2	Sam Sparks	Italian dub
2013	Scooby-Doo! Mask of the Blue Falcon	Daphne Blake	Italian dub
2013	Scooby-Doo! and the Spooky Scarecrow	Daphne Blake	Italian dub
2013	Scooby-Doo! Mecha Mutt Menace	Daphne Blake	Italian dub
2013	Scooby-Doo! Stage Fright	Daphne Blake	Italian dub
2013	Scooby-Doo! Adventures: The Mystery Map	Daphne Blake	Italian dub
2013	Le straordinarie avventure di Jules Verne	Amélie	
2013-2016	My Life as an Adult Android	Jena Wakeman	Italian dub
2014	Scooby-Doo! WrestleMania Mystery	Daphne Blake	Italian dub
2014	Scooby-Doo! Ghastly Goals	Daphne Blake	Italian dub
2014	Scooby-Doo! Frankencreepy	Daphne Blake	Italian dub
2015	Scooby-Doo! Moon Monster Madness	Daphne Blake	Italian dub
2015	Scooby-Doo! and Kiss: Rock and Roll Mystery	Daphne Blake	Italian dub
2015	Lego Scooby-Doo! Knight Time Terror	Daphne Blake	Italian dub
2015	Scooby-Doo! and the Beach Beastie	Daphne Blake	Italian dub
2015-2018	Be Cool, Scooby-Doo!	Daphne Blake	Italian dub
2016	Scooby-Doo! and WWE: Curse of the Speed Demon	Daphne Blake	Italian dub
2016	Lego Scooby-Doo! Haunted Hollywood	Daphne Blake	Italian dub
2016	World of Winx	Tecna	
2016-2018	Tomodachi Life: The TV Series	Julia	Italian dub
2017	Lego Scooby-Doo! Blowout Beach Bash	Daphne Blake	Italian dub
2017	Scooby-Doo! Shaggy's Showdown	Daphne Blake	Italian dub
2018	Scooby-Doo! & Batman: The Brave and the Bold	Daphne Blake	Italian dub
2018	Scoobynatural	Daphne Blake	Italian dub
2018	Scooby-Doo! and the Gourmet Ghost	Daphne Blake	Italian dub
2018-2020	Harvey Girls Forever!	Dot and Lucretia	Italian dub
2019	Scooby-Doo! and the Curse of the 13th Ghost	Daphne Blake	Italian dub
2019	Scooby-Doo! Return to Zombie Island	Daphne Blake	Italian dub
2019	Teen Titans Go!	Daphne Blake	Italian dub
2019-2021	Scooby-Doo and Guess Who?	Daphne Blake	Italian dub
2020	Scoob!	Daphne Blake	Italian dub
2023	Le Stelle di Dora - Le sfide del Generale Carlo Alberto Dalla Chiesa	Voice-over	
2024	Hazbin Hotel	Sera	Italian dub

=== Videogames ===
Year(s)	Title	Role	Notes
2005	Chicken Little	Dina Volpefina	Italian dub
2007	Ratatouille	Colette Tatou	Italian dub
2009	Scooby Doo First Frights	Daphne Blake	Italian dub
2010	Scooby Doo and the Spooky Swamp	Daphne Blake	Italian dub
2011	DC Universe Online	Wonder Woman	Italian dub
2011	Disneyland Adventures	Tiana and Daina	Italian dub
2017	Injustice 2	Harley Quinn	Italian dub
2019	Death Stranding	Fragile	Italian dub
2025	Death Stranding 2: On the Beach	Fragile	Italian dub
