= Letizia Ciampa =

Italian actress

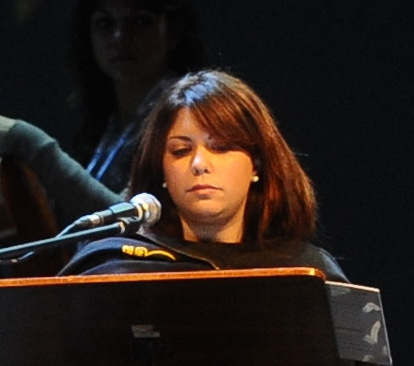
- Ciampa in 2015
- Born: 20 August 1986 (age 40); Rome, Italy
- Occupation: Actress
- Years active: 1996–present

Letizia Ciampa (born 20 August 1986) is an Italian actress.

== Biography ==
She began her career when she was a child, working throughout the years for many studios as a voice actress and dubber and later appearing as an actress in film and television.

Ciampa is known for being the recurring Italian voice dubber of famous actresses such as Emma Watson, Mia Wasikowska, and Anna Popplewell, also dubbing Lucy Hale, Lily James, Kaya Scodelario, Anya Taylor-Joy, and Hailee Steinfeld in multiple roles. She also dubbed Alexa Vega as Carmen Cortez in the Spy Kids franchise, Ashley Olsen in Two of a Kind, Joy Lauren in Desperate Housewives, Kelly Osbourne in Life as We Know It, and the character Daenerys Targaryen, portrayed by Emilia Clarke, in the TV series Game of Thrones.

In her animated roles, Ciampa is best known for voicing Bloom in Winx Club, also dubbing the roles of Anya Alstreim in Code Geass: Lelouch of the Rebellion, Nia Teppelin in Tengen Toppa Gurren Lagann, Chibiusa in the Shin Vision version of the anime movie Sailor Moon R: The Movie, and Mimi Tasogare in Duel Masters.

== Filmography ==
=== Acting roles ===
Year	Title	Role(s)	Notes
2005	Melissa P.	Manuela	
2007	Provaci ancora prof!	Ilaria Bisoglio	TV series, episode: "Vita da cani"
2010	Fratelli detective	Ostage	TV series, episode: "Rapina a mano armata"
2012	Notte prima degli esami '82	Santilli	TV film
2014	Tre tocchi	Angela	
2015	All Roads Lead to Rome	Girl at café	Cameo

=== Voice work ===
Year	Title	Role	Notes	Ref
2000	Titanic: The Legend Goes On	Pablito	Animated film	
2003	The Spaghetti Family	Anna and Irma Spaghetti	Animated series	
2004-2019	Winx Club	Bloom, Tune	Animated series	
2007	Winx Club: The Secret of the Lost Kingdom	Bloom	Animated film	
2008	La Pallastrike sull'isola di Pasqua	Yara	Animated film	
2010	Winx Club 3D: Magical Adventure	Bloom, Tune	Animated film	
2010-2014	Spike Team	Susan	Animated series	
2014	Winx Club: The Mystery of the Abyss	Bloom	Animated film	
2015	Acid Space	Jenny	Animated film	
2017	World of Winx	Bloom	Animated series	

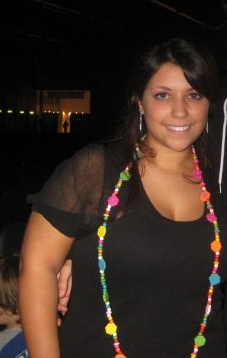
Ciampa at the Romics convention in 2009

==== Dubbing ====
===== Animation =====
- Sadie in Total Drama
- Jenny in Monster House
- Mystique Sonia in Hero: 108
- Princess Pea in The Tale of Despereaux
- Alana in The Little Mermaid 3
- Ruffnut Thorston in How to Train Your Dragon
- Mimi Tasogare in Duel Masters
- Nia Teppelin in Gurren Lagann
- Hotaru Imai in Gakuen Alice
- Sayu Yagami in Death Note
- Theresa in Class of the Titans
- Alya Césaire in Miraculous: Tales of Ladybug & Cat Noir
- Young Wendy in Return to Never Land
- Tille McNally in ChalkZone
- Nausicaä in Nausicaä of the Valley of the Wind
- Loona in Helluva Boss

===== Live action =====
- Hermione Granger in Harry Potter and the Philosopher's Stone, Harry Potter and the Chamber of Secrets, Harry Potter and the Prisoner of Azkaban, Harry Potter and the Goblet of Fire, Harry Potter and the Order of the Phoenix, Harry Potter and the Half-Blood Prince, Harry Potter and the Deathly Hallows – Part 1, Harry Potter and the Deathly Hallows – Part 2
- Carmen Cortez in Spy Kids, Spy Kids 2: The Island of Lost Dreams, Spy Kids 3-D: Game Over, Spy Kids: All the Time in the World
- Gabriella Montez in High School Musical, High School Musical 2, High School Musical 3: Senior Year
- Tin-Tin Kyrano in Thunderbirds
- Leslie Burke in Bridge to Terabithia
- Alice Kingsleigh in Alice in Wonderland
- Taylor Fry in Mortified
- Ashley Burke in Two of a Kind
- Stevie Lake in The Saddle Club
- Daenerys Targaryen in Game of Thrones
