= Winx Club: The Secret of the Lost Kingdom =

- Italian theatrical release poster
- Italian: Winx Club - Il segreto del regno perduto
- Directed by: Iginio Straffi
- Screenplay by: Iginio Straffi; Sean Molyneaux
- Story by: Iginio Straffi; Francesco Artibani; Joanne Lee
- Based on: Winx Club by Iginio Straffi
- Produced by: Iginio Straffi
- Starring: Letizia Ciampa; Perla Liberatori; Ilaria Latini; Gemma Donati; Domitilla D'Amico; Laura Lenghi
- Cinematography: Corrado Virgili
- Music by: Paolo Baglio; Giovanni Cera; Angelo Poggi
- Layouts by: Vincenzo Nisco
- Production companies: Rainbow S.p.A.; Rai Fiction
- Distributed by: 01 Distribution
- Release date: 30 November 2007
- Running time: 88 minutes
- Country: Italy
- Language: Italian
- Budget: €25 million
- Box office: $18,523,991

Winx Club: The Secret of the Lost Kingdom (Italian: Winx Club - Il segreto del regno perduto) is a 2007 Italian animated fantasy film directed and co-written by Iginio Straffi. It is an adaptation of the animated television series Winx Club, taking place after the events of the first three seasons.

The film was released in Italy on 30 November 2007, by 01 Distribution. It was released theatrically from the same date onwards in select regions. In the United States, the film premiered direct-to-television on Nickelodeon on 11 March 2012, following the channel's parent company Viacom becoming a co-owner of Rainbow S.p.A.

== Plot ==
Bloom and her friends Stella, Flora, Musa, Tecna and Aisha (or Layla in some dubs) are searching for Bloom's birth parents, King Oritel and Queen Marion. They seek the help of Hagen, the blacksmith who crafted Oritel's powerful sword. Sneaking into Hagen's castle, they are mistaken for intruders. Faragonda, an old friend of Hagen's, intervenes, and they return to Alfea empty-handed. Despite Bloom's plea for assistance, Hagen confesses his inability to help, leaving Bloom feeling guilty for her friends' futile efforts. She flees in tears to avoid confronting them.

Most of the third-year fairies at Alfea, including the Winx (except Bloom), graduate and become guardian fairies of their home planets after obtaining their Enchantix powers. Bloom, with her incomplete powers, stays behind, watched over by Sky, who consoles her and encourages her to continue her quest despite Hagen's discouragement. Their tender moment is interrupted by the sudden arrival of a mysterious girl. The following day, Bloom departs for Earth to stay with her adoptive parents. Despite appearing content, her discomfort on Earth is evident to Mike and Vanessa, who recognize her true belonging in the Magical Dimension. That night, Bloom has a dream of her sister Daphne, who provides hope by revealing that their parents are still alive and shares vital information about the Book of Fate.

The next morning, Bloom is surprised by her friends gathering at her house to celebrate her nineteenth birthday. United, they agree to support Bloom's plan, reinforcing their unbreakable bond of friendship. Bloom's renewed hope triggers the activation of Oritel's sword, drawing attention from the dark forces of the Obsidian Circle. Troubled by this, the three Ancestral Witches employ Mandragora to investigate and eliminate the source.

Meanwhile, the team journeys to Domino, guided by Daphne's mask and memories. Upon reaching the mountain where the Book of Fate is hidden, they encounter the Roc, a mystical guardian of the library. A mishap with the Specialists awakens the Roc, causing chaos, but the girls ultimately manage to safely land the creature, ensuring their progress continues.

Inside the library, Bloom and her friends meet Bartelby, Oritel's spirit scribe, who reveals the Book of Fate. They learn that Bloom's parents were part of the Company of Light, fighting against the Ancestral Witches. However, crucial pages detailing their fate are missing. Bartelby prophesies the salvation of Domino by six legendary warriors and the freeing of Oritel's sword by a king without a crown. Celebrating this revelation, Riven falls under Mandragora's control.

Alfea is then attacked by Mandragora, who gains insight into Bloom before vanishing. After restoring Alfea, the group heads to Pixie Village in search of a way into the Obsidian Circle. Guided by Lockette, they approach the gateway. Mandragora intervenes, pitting Riven against Sky and endangering Musa.

The girls are forced to face their worst fears, and Bloom sees a vision of what happened to her birth parents: Oritel was pulled into the Obsidian Circle by the Ancestral Witches while Marion absorbed herself into the sword in order to be with him. To Bloom's horror, she sees her father frozen in stone, the same fate for all inhabitants of her planet. All the fairies then wake up from their trances, only to come face-to-face with the Ancestral Witches, who severely weaken the Winx except Bloom. They force Bloom to make a choice between destroying the sword and saving her adoptive parents or taking the sword and letting Mandragora kill them, as seen in an image. Luckily, Bloom sees through the illusion and places her trust in the boys, while they are still fighting Mandragora, unleashing the power of the Dragon Flame. Outside, Riven recalls all what he and Musa have been through together. Regaining his sanity, he lifts her up and they kiss. Meanwhile, chasing after Mandragora, Sky arrives moments later to aid a struggling Bloom and takes the sword, but supposedly dies, as only a king can wield the sword.

Eventually Bloom's Dragon Flame also succumbs under the darkness of the Obsidian Circle and is ready to give up when Daphne reminds her that she is not alone. She puts on the mask, and Daphne joins with her to destroy the Ancestral Witches. However, Mandragora returns and the Ancestral Witches use her body as a host and begin to strangle Bloom to death, but Sky reawakens and stabs Mandragora with Oritel's sword, allowing Bloom to use the power of the Dragon Flame on Mandragora, destroying both her and the entire Obsidian Circle, completing her Enchantix powers and freeing everyone. Sky explains that he is now the king of Eraklyon, and his coronation was the night he left Bloom at Alfea. With Domino restored to its former glory, Oritel is freed from stone, Marion is released from the sword, and Bloom reunites with her birth parents at last.

At a party afterwards, Oritel and Marion promise Bloom that they will never leave her again. Mike and Vanessa are also there and are greeted by a hug from Bloom. Oritel begins the traditional dad-daughter dance, but lets Bloom dance with Sky, who proposes to her. She delightfully accepts, and as they kiss, Bartelby appears by the Book of Fate, telling the audience that the prophecy has been fulfilled; Bloom is now a guardian fairy and there is a new Company of Light - the Winx.

In the final scene, it is revealed the Ancestral Witches have not been destroyed by the Dragon Flame; instead, their spirits were freed with the destruction of the Obsidian Circle and are finding new hosts to take over and destroy the Winx. They are shown with their direct descendants, the Trix, cackling madly. This is a cliffhanger leading to the second film.

== Voice cast ==
The actors in the English versions are uncredited.

Character	Italian	English	
Character	Italian	Dubbing Brothers (2008)	Atlas Oceanic/Nickelodeon (2012)
Bloom	Letizia Ciampa	Cindy Robinson	Molly C. Quinn
Stella	Perla Liberatori	Becca Ordonez	Amy Gross
Flora	Ilaria Latini	Stephanie Sheh	Alejandra Reynoso
Musa	Gemma Donati	Sarah Sido	Romi Dames
Tecna	Domitilla D'Amico	Sabrina Weisz	Morgan Decker
Aisha	Laura Lenghi	Mela Lee	Keke Palmer
Kiko	Ivan Andreani		Dee Bradley Baker
Prince Sky	Marco Vivio	Christopher Corey Smith	Matt Shively
Brandon	Gianfranco Miranda	TBD	Adam Gregory
Helia	Leonardo Graziano	TBD	David Faustino
Riven	Emiliano Coltorti	Steve Staley	Sam Riegel
Timmy	Davide Perino	TBD	Charlie Schlatter
Tune	Letizia Ciampa	TBD	Lara Jill Miller
Chatta	Perla Liberatori	TBD	Lara Jill Miller
Zing	Perla Liberatori	TBD	Jessica DiCicco
Livy	Domitilla D'Amico	TBD	Lara Jill Miller
Piff	Domitilla D'Amico	TBD	Georgie Kidder
Digit	Gemma Donati	TBD	Georgie Kidder
Amore	Ilaria Latini	TBD	Eva Longoria
Lockette	Laura Lenghi	TBD	Eva Longoria
Belladonna	Monica Migliori	TBD	Grey DeLisle
Liliss	Pasquale Anselmo	TBD	Candi Milo
Tharma	Cinzia Villari	TBD	Laraine Newman
Mandragora	Cinzia De Carolis	Melodee M. Spevack	Carolyn Lawrence
Miss Faragonda	Emanuela Rossi	Mari Devon	Kari Wahlgren
Inspector Griselda	Franca Lumachi	Dorothy Elias-Fahn	Susanne Blakeslee
Professor Wizgiz	Luigi Ferraro	Christopher Corey Smith	Dee Bradley Baker
Professor Palladium	Alessandro Budroni	Ezra Weisz	Mitchell Whitfield
King Oritel	Francesco Prando	Ezra Weisz	Josh Keaton
Queen Marion	Claudia Razzi	Sabrina Weisz	Grey DeLisle
Daphne	Roberta Pellini	TBD	Elizabeth Gillies
Mike	Roberto Certomà	Christopher Corey Smith	James Patrick Stuart
Vanessa	Barbara De Bortoli	Stephanie Sheh	April Stewart
Hagen	Rodolfo Bianchi	Terrence Stone	Victor Brandt
Lord Bartelby	Gabriele Lavia	Jamieson Price	James Garrett (actor)James Garrett
Narrator	Gabriele Lavia	Jamieson Price	James Garrett (actor)James Garrett
Darcy	Federica De Bortoli	Karen Strassman	Larisa Oleynik

== Soundtrack ==
Winx Club: The Secret of the Lost Kingdom

Soundtrack album by various artists
- Released: 16 November 2007
- Length: 26:07

Elisa Rosselli sings the first six songs on the soundtrack. Natalie Imbruglia sings the film's ending song, "All the Magic".

Winx Club: The Secret of the Lost Kingdom
No.	Title	Length
1.	"You're the One"	3:41
2.	"Fly"	3:18
3.	"Only a Girl"	4:14
4.	"You Made Me a Woman"	4:05
5.	"Enchantix"	2:09
6.	"Stand Up"	3:28
7.	"All the Magic"	4:47

== Distribution ==
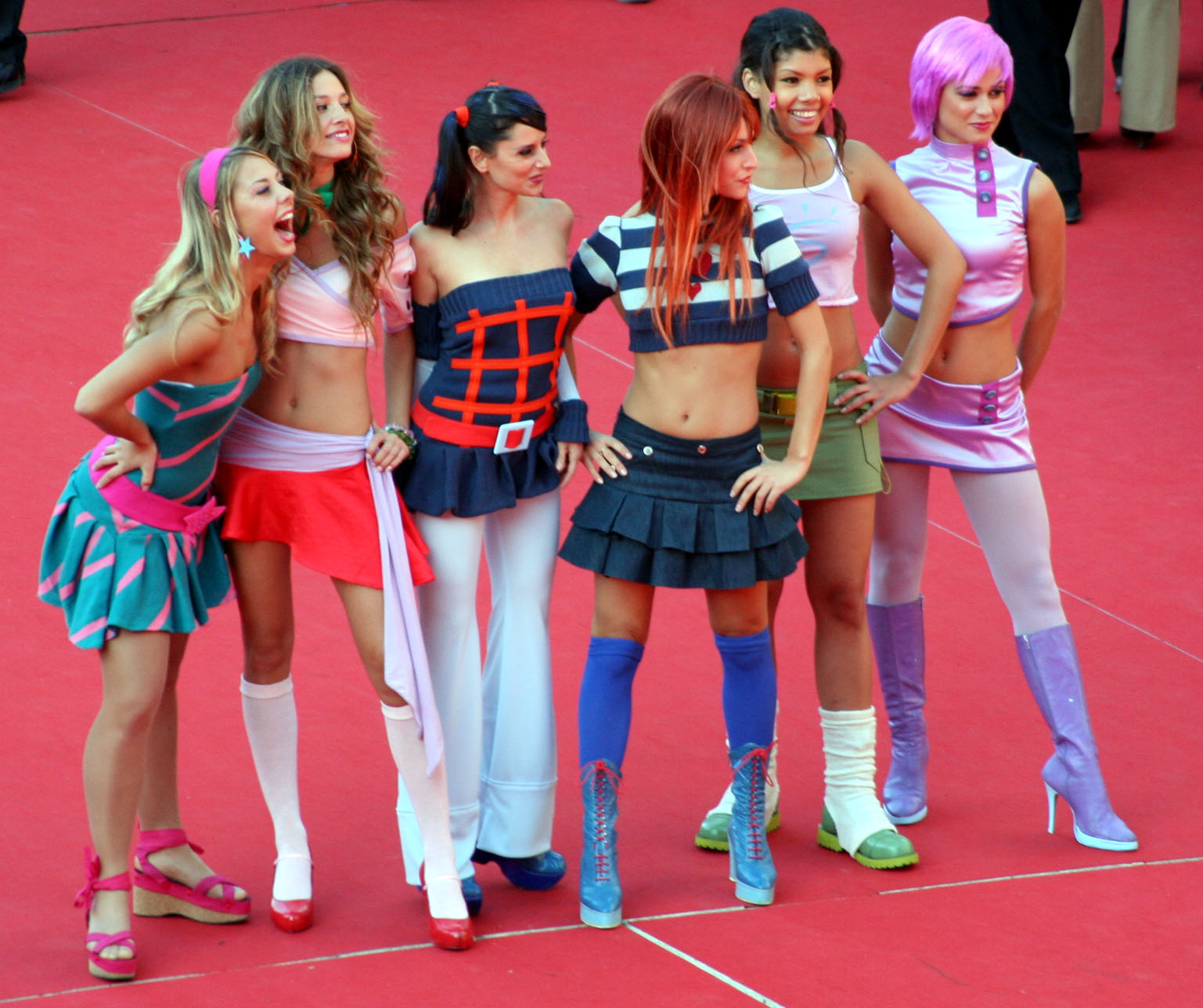
Dancers dressed as the Winx Club posing at the Rome FilmFest.

A live-action dance show was performed to promote the film at the 2007 Rome Film Festival. In the first week of showing, the film was distributed in 665 cinemas and had 420,000 viewers. It received 1,979,972 euros ($3,074,695.84 US) in its opening week, and ended its run with five million euros in revenue. It was released on DVD in Italy in March 2008.

The movie premiered on Nickelodeon in America on 11 March 2012. All of the dialogue was re-recorded with the voice actors from the 2011 Winx Club revival. This version was released as a two-disc DVD set on 7 August 2012 by Paramount Pictures. The second disc included seven bonus episodes from the TV series. In October 2013, Nickelodeon released a line of DVDs called "Holiday Gifts from Nickelodeon," including a special Christmas edition of The Secret of the Lost Kingdom that came with a Winx Club coloring book, poster, and stickers.

== Sequel ==
On 29 October 2010, a sequel, Winx Club 3D: Magical Adventure, was released in Italy.
