= Winx Club 3D: Magical Adventure =

- Italian theatrical release poster
- Italian: Winx Club 3D: Magica Avventura
- Directed by: Iginio Straffi
- Written by: Iginio Straffi
- Based on: Winx Club by Iginio Straffi
- Produced by: Iginio Straffi
- Starring: Letizia Ciampa; Perla Liberatori; Ilaria Latini; Gemma Donati; Domitilla D'Amico; Laura Lenghi
- Cinematography: Gianmario Catania; Corrado Virgili
- Music by: Paolo Baglio
- Layouts by: Daniele Pintene
- Production company: Rainbow CGI Animation Studio
- Distributed by: Medusa Film
- Release date: 29 October 2010
- Running time: 87 minutes
- Country: Italy
- Language: Italian
- Budget: $35 million
- Box office: $11,583,758

Winx Club 3D: Magical Adventure (Italian: Winx Club 3D - Magica Avventura) is a 2010 Italian animated fantasy film directed and written by Iginio Straffi. It is an adaptation of the animated television series Winx Club, and a sequel to Winx Club: The Secret of the Lost Kingdom (2007).

The film was produced by Rainbow S.p.A. and was released in Italy on October 29, 2010. In February 2011, Nickelodeon's parent company Viacom became a co-owner of Rainbow, and it was announced that Viacom would re-release Magical Adventure through its subsidiary Paramount Pictures.

On February 19, 2013, Nickelodeon held a screening of the movie at the TCL Chinese Theatre in Hollywood. On May 20, Nickelodeon's American channel aired the movie, and Paramount released it on DVD on August 13.

== Plot ==
The movie begins with a welcome party between Alfea and Cloud Tower. During the annual prank by the witches in which the food turns anyone who eats it into toads, the Trix crash it and take the Compass of Revealed Secrets for the Ancestral Witches. Despite the Winx's efforts, Icy, Stormy and Darcy escape with the compass. Meanwhile, on Domino, Bloom struggles to adjust to her new life of royalty. Sky proposes to Bloom, much to the delight of her and her royal family. The Trix report to the Ancestral Witches on the successful theft and learn of the Tree of Life holding the balance between good and evil magical energy. In order to earn the Ancestral Witches' Powers, the Trix searches for the Tree of Life.

Back on Eraklyon, Sky informs his dad of his engagement to Bloom. A horrified King Erendor reveals a dark secret about Erendor and Domino's destruction, forcing Sky to call off the engagement and devastating Bloom. Enraged and overprotective of his only living daughter, King Oritel announces Bloom's debut to search for her next prince, according to Domino tradition where the King chooses his daughters' partners. The debut is announced all over Magix, prompting the rest of the Winx to visit Bloom and assist her in reject her would-be suitors. Sky sneaks in and meets Bloom, saying that he will fix everything. He is soon discovered by an upset King Oritel. He gives Bloom a letter before being forced to leave. Bloom protests what is written on the letter but is overruled by her father. An upset Bloom transports to Gardenia with the Winx. At the same time, the Trix arrive at Pixie Village and take over the Tree of Life. This eliminates all good powers of the fairies, along with the Winx's Believix. Powerless in Gardenia, the Winx turn to Bloom's adoptive parents Mike and Vanessa for shelter and meet up with the Specialists. Meanwhile, the Ancestral Witches learn that there is one tiny source of positive energy left in the universe. They remember giving King Erendor an hourglass with the tree's pollen, which protected Eraklyon when the Witches destroyed Domino. In Gardenia, the Winx and the Specialists travel to Avram, which is the city with the last known sighting of the pollen. The Trix find Erendor and force him to give them the whereabouts of the pollen.

Along the way, their ship is attacked by the ghosts of Avram citizens. Oritel discovers Sky's letter, learning of why he called off the wedding. The team learns that Erendor, living with immense guilt for protecting his kingdom while his friend's own was destroyed, broke the hourglass, releasing the pollen and forming a seedling. Trying to get to the middle of Avram, Bloom gets separated from the others. Bloom ends up finding the seedling and Icy, while the rest of the Winx battle Stormy and Darcy. Struggling without their full powers, the Winx and Specialists battle the Witches and their Ancestral counterparts. The ensuing has Icy destroying the seedling, causing all the good magic to be released and restoring the Winx's Believix. The Ancient Witches then merge with their Trix counterparts and attack the Winx. King Oritel and King Erendor arrive to aid the Winx in their battle against the witches and manage to reconcile. Icy manages to kill King Erendor when he sacrifices himself to protect Bloom. The Winx defeat the Trix and destroy the Ancestral Witches with a Believix Convergence. King Oritel reveals that he had collected some of the pollen from the seedling and sprinkles it on King Erendor, bringing him back to life before apologizing to Sky and gives him and Bloom his blessing on their engagement. Bloom and Sky reconcile as the city begins to revive around them. They imprison the Trix once again and fly back to Eraklyon's main city together.

== Voice cast ==
Character	Italian	English (Dubbing Brothers)	English (Atlas Oceanic)
Bloom	Letizia Ciampa	Cindy Robinson	Molly C. Quinn
Stella	Perla Liberatori	Erin Fitzgerald	Amy Gross
Flora	Ilaria Latini	Stephanie Sheh	Alejandra Reynoso
Musa	Gemma Donati	Sarah Sido	Romi Dames
Tecna	Domitilla D'Amico	Sabrina Weisz	Morgan Decker
Aisha	Laura Lenghi	Mela Lee	Keke Palmer
Prince Sky	Marco Vivio	N/A	Matt Shively
Brandon	Gianfranco Miranda	N/A	Adam Gregory
Helia	Leonardo Graziano	N/A	David Faustino
Riven	Emiliano Coltorti	N/A	Sam Riegel
Timmy	Davide Perino	N/A	Charlie Schlatter
Nabu	Sacha De Toni	N/A	Will Blagrove
Narrator	Claudia Catani	N/A	Kari Wahlgren

== Soundtrack ==
Winx Club 3D: Magical Adventure

Soundtrack album by Various artists
- Released: October 1, 2010
- Length: 44:13
- Label: Rainbow Media Pte Ltd

Winx Club 3D: Magical Adventure (Original Motion Picture Soundtrack) was released on October 1, 2010.

=== Track listing ===
No.	Title	Length
1.	"A Magical World of Wonder"	2:55
2.	"Believix (You're Magical)"	3:05
3.	"Good Girls Bad Girls"	2:43
4.	"Forever"	3:23
5.	"Don't Wake Me Up"	4:12
6.	"Famous Girls"	3:21
7.	"Supergirls"	3:17
8.	"Love Can't Be Denied"	3:47
9.	"Endlessly"	4:35
10.	"Big Boy"	2:53
11.	"Love Is a Miracle"	10:02
