= The Forsytes =

British television series

- Series 1 promotional poster
- Created by: Debbie Horsfield
- Based on: The Forsyte Saga by John Galsworthy
- Screenplay by: Debbie Horsfield
- Directed by: Meenu Gaur; Annetta Laufer; Andy Newbery
- Creative director: Rebecca Keane
- Starring: Francesca Annis; Joshua Orpin; Millie Gibson; Jack Davenport; Stephen Moyer; Tom Durant-Pritchard; Eleanor Jackson; Jamie Flatters; Danny Griffin; Eleanor Tomlinson; Tuppence Middleton; Justine Moore; Susan Hampshire; Owen Igiehon; Naomi Frederick; Fiona Button
- Composer: Anne Dudley
- Country of origin: United Kingdom
- Original language: English
- No. of series: 2
- No. of episodes: 12

Production
- Executive producers: Debbie Horsfield; Sheena Bucktowonsing; Meenu Gaur; Damien Timmer; Susanne Simpson
- Cinematography: Andrew McDonnell
- Running time: 44-52 minutes
- Production companies: Mammoth Screen; PBS Masterpiece

Original release
- Network: 5
- Release: 20 October 2025 – present

The Forsytes is a television series adaptation of the novels by John Galsworthy. It is created and written by Debbie Horsfield. The series is led by an ensemble cast which includes Francesca Annis, Jack Davenport, Millie Gibson, Danny Griffin, Tuppence Middleton, Stephen Moyer, Joshua Orpin and Eleanor Tomlinson. It is broadcast in the United Kingdom on 5 since 20 October 2025.

The renewal for second series was announced months before the series premiered. On 10 March 2026, it was renewed for a third series.

== Premise ==
The series is set in late-Victorian England and follows the lives and scandals of an upper middle-class family of stockbrokers across four separate generations.

== Plot ==
=== Series 1 (2025) - a prequel ===
The series opens in 1877 at the wedding of Jo Forsyte to Frances, an upper-class widow whose match with Jo propels the family into upper-class circles. In marrying her, Jo adopts her 8-year-old daughter, June. A time jump to 1887 re-introduces the family as they prepare for June's 18th birthday ball, marking her coming out into society. At the same time, Jolyon Snr. has stepped down as chairman of the family law firm, Forsyte & Co., and named his son as successor, which angers his younger brother James and James' son Soames. Jo's world is rocked when Louisa is summoned to the house to make an emergency repair to June’s gown as he knew her on his grand tour in Venice. It is revealed to Frances first, then to him, that this relationship led to Louisa becoming mother to twins, Jolyon "Jos" and Holly Byrne.

While walking through the park, Soames and his father James pass the Heron family and Soames comes to the rescue when Professor Heron suffers from a heart attack, meeting his beautiful daughter Irene in the process. Heron dies and Soames goes to the cemetery, where he is able to meet Irene again. She is appreciative of his condolences. Soames continues to court Irene, getting to know her, alluding to his developing romantic feelings for her and, learning of her ambitions of becoming a ballet dancer in Paris like her mother, promises to take her to Paris so that she can audition for an elite ballet troupe. These meetings charm her, though she does not love him, and she accepts his proposal under the condition that if their marriage should not be a success, he would let her go. Soames announces the engagement to his family at Royal Ascot and they are married by special license, albeit not without a few doubts had by Irene.

Jo tries to see Louisa and the children more and though Louisa is initially hesitant and unwilling to be his "guilty secret", she eventually relents and they spend more time together, reminiscing about Venice. One day, James spots Jo leaving, alluding him to the existence of illegitimate children. Frances also discovers that her husband is sneaking out of the house to visit Louisa and demands him to cut ties, which he is unwilling to do. Once married, Soames and Irene honeymoon in Paris but what Irene dancing could mean begins to dawn on Soames and after a fearful vision of the future, he deceives her about his father's health to return them to London sooner than planned. Irene struggles to settle in London, still dreaming of Paris, but she finds comfort in June and Frances' friendships.

She learns of Soames' deception when Emily reveals that James has never been ill and she confronts her husband but he threatens her into obedience. Soames decides to commission Philip Bosinney to build a country house to take Irene away from the city and Irene discovers this thanks to an excited June, as the commission allows her and Phil to marry. Irene is heartbroken and reveals this to Bosinney, who attempts to raise the cost of the build so high to force Soames to back out.

At the gala celebrating Jo's future inheritance, Irene reminds Soames of the promise he made her when she accepted his proposal but he feigns ignorance, revealing to her that she is now trapped. Ann reveals that she reimbursed a client named Harry Falconer, who lost an investment through the firm's actions, as he is her grandson. Jo refuses to attend the gala and tells Frances he plans to leave to live with Louisa and the twins. Frances reluctantly accepts but disallows a divorce, meaning the twins cannot be legitimatised. Jo accepts and leaves, going to Louisa to confess his love. She accepts and they kiss.

=== Series 2 (2026) - adapted from The Man of Property ===
Six months later, in 1888, Irene wakes up with the suspicion that she could be pregnant. Soames is delighted by the idea and pushes Bosinney even further on his work at Robin Hill. Jo returns to London to exhibit some of his paintings, which upsets Frances. He makes one sale, which Irene purchases. She confides in Winifred that she is not in fact pregnant, who then advises her on how to avoid pregnancy. She then decides to spend her ovulating week in Brighton under the guise of meeting her stepmother. Jolyon confronts Ann about her revelation at the gala and this leads to her writing to meet with Alexandra, though she warns her not to make contact with him. Jo attempts to reconcile with his father, Frances, and June but they are unwilling. Isaac and Alicia christen their new son Elijah, which makes Soames long for fatherhood and unnerves Irene, and Jo and Louisa as godparents forces a confrontation between Louisa and Frances. Jolyon changes his will, with Isaac as witness, in order to disinherit and financially ruin his son. Soames later confesses to Irene that he caused her father's investments to fail and offers financial assistance to her stepmother, which worries her regarding Brighton. She tearfully confides in June that she intends to try at her marriage for a full year before either committing to motherhood or leaving.

Irene throws herself into her role of wife as Soames makes progress at the firm, and seeks advice from Frances on what makes a good hostess. She assists Frances and Alicia in their philanthropic efforts and together they organise a costume ball. The ball is a success and Frances' connection to Sir Hugo Carteret means that the firm secures his investment in Soames' scheme. At the celebration, Irene is by Soames' side for the first time in an official capacity. She steps away and is met by Phil and they almost kiss before she pushes him away to rejoin Soames.

Sir Hugo invites the Forsytes to his ancestral seat, Frampton Park, inadvertently creating more tension between Phil and Irene. Hugo uses this visit to prematurely propose to Frances. Once returned, Soames interrogates Irene about her distance, asking if she still loves him, which she avoids answering and flees. She is met in the park by Phil, who kisses her. She pushes him away but unbeknownst to them, James has seen them but does not yet have the opportunity to tell Soames. Elsewhere in London, it is the anniversary of Jo's mother's death so he and Jos have gone fishing at the spot he and his father went every previous year. This is despite Louisa and Holly falling ill. Frances attends and sits with Louisa and though she is reluctant to admit that Louisa will die, she promises to take care of the children. Jolyon himself tells Jo but they arrive home too late. While Holly has recovered and is now sleeping, Louisa has died.

Jolyon, Frances, and June offer their support to Jo by attending Louisa’s funeral and Frances makes good on her promise. She helps with their integration into the family and while committing to her philanthropy, opens an institution designed to help ‘fallen’ women and their children and announces it in Louisa’s honour. At the reception, she and Jo reach a peace. James’ side is reluctant to accept them so easily and Val teases the twins’ lack of etiquette at a luncheon. James is suspicious of Irene and Soames' behaviour and declares that he intends to tell Soames the truth. Soames is, however, reluctant to believe him as he does not yet have any inclination to not trust his wife but does keep watch. Meanwhile, Irene is trying to dissuade Phil’s attentions to not betray June, who is increasingly suspicious of Phil’s distance and confides in her father, alluding to the fact that she knows Phil is in love with her friend. Soames has Isaac draw up a contract for the work on Robin Hill, coercing Irene to convince Phil to finish the build within three months or to face bankruptcy. Jolyon proposes marriage to Alexandra, which horrifies Ann, who makes him realise that marrying her would recognise Harry as his eldest son, displacing Jo as his heir.

Jo, on behalf of June, confronts Phil, forcing a confession, which June overhears. Phil sends a love letter asking Irene to run away with him but this is intercepted by Soames, who storms to his studio and threatens him. Soames confronts Irene about the note and her Brighton deception. He repeats her marriage vows to her and rapes her. She leaves him the next morning, going to Phil’s studio, only to find June already there, cutting off her engagement. June bitterly forgives them both and leaves. Irene learns that Soames has paid him to leave London and cut ties with all Forsytes. As such, he is now reluctant to help her escape and she leaves alone. Frances offers Fitzalan Terrace to Jo and the children but they agree to formally separate. She rejects Sir Hugo’s marriage proposal but invites the idea of a companion while she travels across Europe. Soames discovers that Irene has left him and vows to his mother that he will find her and bring her back. As Irene has finally received the painting she had purchased from Jo, she flees to Paris.

== Cast ==
=== Main ===
Role	Played by	Description
Ann Forsyte	Francesca Annis	A widow and the grand matriarch of the Forsyte family, her dowry helped set up the family firm, Forsyte and Co.
James Forsyte	Jack Davenport	As the younger brother of Jolyon Sr. and Emily's husband, he is constantly competing with his elder brother in the family business and devotes most of his efforts to supporting his son Soames' interests and tolerating his daughter Winifred's whims.
Jolyon Forsyte Sr.	Stephen Moyer	Ann's eldest son and the chairman of Forsyte and Co., he values duty and family reputation above all. As a widower, he is determined to secure his son Jo's future at the firm.
Soames Forsyte	Joshua Orpin	A successful and respected businessman and highly eligible bachelor, he is highly competitive with his cousin Jo. His life changes when he meets the beautiful ballerina Irene, whose free spirit challenges his possessive ways.
Jolyon "Jo" Forsyte Jnr.	Danny Griffin	Frances' husband and June's stepfather, he struggles to balance his family responsibilities with his passion for art. His life changes when his former love Louisa reappears and disrupts his world.
Frances Forsyte	Tuppence Middleton	A widow and queen of high society who marries Jo, joining the Forsyte family and becomes committed to preserving its reputation. Their match was arranged but becomes a loving one that becomes disrupted when Louisa returns to Jo's life and threatens both her and her daughter's position.
Irene Heron	Millie Gibson	A young ballerina, exceptionally beautiful, cultural, and strong-minded, who grew up in Paris, believing she could be a ballerina like her mother. When her father dies suddenly and she loses the financial means to follow her dreams, she is charmed by Soames Forsyte and marries him.
June Forsyte	Justine Moore	Frances' spirited daughter who believes she should be free to make her own choices in love, falling in love with the rebellious but penniless architect Philip Bosinney, to whom she becomes engaged.
Philip Bosinney	Jamie Flatters	An architect proud of his rebellious and artistic vision, he tentatively becomes engaged to June Forsyte. He later falls in love with Irene but is unsuccessful in convincing her to run away with him.

=== Recurring & Guest ===
Role	Played by	Description	Episodes
Winifred Dartie	Eleanor Jackson	Emily and James' daughter and sister of Soames, she is married to the foppish Montague Dartie and tries to persuade her family to accept her husband onto the board of Forsyte and Co.	12 episodes
Montague "Monty" Dartie	Tom Durant-Pritchard	Winifred's rakish husband who does not know much about business and has an affinity for losing money but believes in himself a lot and tries hard to join Forsyte and Co. in an important position	12 episodes
Emily Forsyte	Naomi Frederick	James' wife and mother to Soames and Winifred, who is accustomed to putting her family first, tolerates her husband and adores her son. She is blind to Soames' faults and has a faithful companion in her dog Cyril.	12 episodes
Louisa Byrne	Eleanor Tomlinson	A dressmaker devoted to her children, she must face the return of her former love Jo. His return brings back old feelings and leads her to deal with the complicated Forsyte family. Louisa is an original character loosely based on Helène from the novels.	Series 1-2; 10 episodes
Isaac Cole	Owen Igiehon	In-house lawyer at Forsyte and Co. and Jo's best friend.	Series 1-3; 8 episodes
Alicia Cole	Sharon Rose (series 1) and Nia Ashi (series 2-3)	The wife of Jo's best friend Isaac.	Series 1-3; 9 episodes
Lady Carteret	Susan Hampshire	A friend of the Forsyte family and mother of Sir Hugo. She played Fleur Forsyte in the original BBC adaptation from 1967.	Series 1-2; 8 episodes
Sir Hugo Carteret	Richard Rankin	Lady Carteret's son, a baronet, and an admirer for Frances. He once met her when they were young but his feelings have never gone away.	Series 2-3; 6 episodes
Alexandra Falconer	Sarah Alexander	Jolyon Sr.'s former lover and mother of Harry Falconer.	Series 2; 6 episodes
Mrs Clarissa Heron	Fiona Button	Irene's stepmother, who wants her stepdaughter to marry Soames in order to regain her social status.	Series 1; 3 episodes
Mrs Ellen Parker Barrington	Josette Simon	A friend of the Forsyte family who is committed to standing up against injustice whenever she encounters it.	Series 1; 3 episodes
Professor Sidney Heron	Tristan Sturrock	Irene's father and an investor in the Durham Mining Company. After he suffers a heart attack and the mining company fails, his daughter and wife are left with nothing.	Series 1; 1 episode

=== Young actors ===
- Billie Joyce as 8-year-old June Forsyte (series 1; 1 episode)
- Dexter Seaton as Jolyon "Jos" Byrne, Louisa and Jo's son
- Tilly Walker as Holly Byrne, Louisa and Jo's daughter
- Ollie Wood as Publius Valerius "Val" Dartie, Winifred and Monty's son (series 2; 4 episodes)

== Forsyte family tree ==
Ann Forsyte	Jolyon Forsyte (deceased)
Edith Forsyte (deceased)	Jolyon Forsyte Snr.	Alexandra Falconer (née Shepherd)	James Forsyte	Emily Forsyte
Louisa Byrne d.1888	Jolyon "Jo" Forsyte Jnr.	Frances Forsyte m.1877-, sep.1887	Harry Falconer	Irene Forsyte (née Heron) m.1887-, sep.1888	Soames Forsyte	Winifred Dartie (née Forsyte)	Montague "Monty" Dartie
Jolyon "Jos" Forsyte (né Byrne)	Holly Forsyte (née Byrne)	June Forsyte	Philip Bosinney	Publius Valerius "Val" Dartie

== Episodes ==
Series	Episodes	Originally released	
Series	Episodes	First released	Last released
1	6	20 October 2025 (U.K.)	24 November 2025 (U.K.)
2	6	13 September 2026 (Europe)	18 October 2026 (Europe)
3	3	2027	2027

=== Series 1 (2025) ===
No.	Title	Directed by	Written by	Original release date	U.K. viewers (millions)
1	"1.1"	Meenu Gaur	Debbie Horsfield & John Galsworthy	20 October 2025	1.63
The Forsytes prepare to celebrate daughter June's 18th birthday and her entrance into society - but her grandfather Jolyon makes a shock announcement at the party, and Frances makes a distressing discovery.
2	"1.2"	Meenu Gaur	Debbie Horsfield & John Galsworthy	27 October 2025	1.37
Frances reels from her discovery. The Forsytes prepare for a night at the opera. Jolyon Jnr. visits Louisa, but he is spotted leaving by James, who comes to a realisation. Soames faces heartache.
3	"1.3"	Meenu Gaur	Debbie Horsfield & John Galsworthy	3 November 2025	1.15
Jolyon Jnr. recalls his affair with Louisa but fails to reassure June. At Forsyte & Co., James's scheme to oust him backfires. And Soames solidifies his engagement to Irene with a ring.
4	"1.4"	Annetta Laufer	Debbie Horsfield & John Galsworthy	10 November 2025	1.06
Jolyon Jnr. assures Frances and June he has cut ties with Louisa. Frances resumes her efforts to secure Horatio for June. In Paris, Soames begins to realise he doesn't fit in with Irene's friends.
5	"1.5"	Annetta Laufer	Debbie Horsfield & John Galsworthy	17 November 2025	1.04
At Forsyte & Co, the climbing Ceylon Gold share price casts doubt on Jolyon's cautious approach. Disaster strikes at the Ceylon Gold mine, prompting the share price to plummet.
6	"1.6"	Annetta Laufer	Debbie Horsfield & John Galsworthy	24 November 2025	0.90
Frances struggles to hold it together, fearing she is a source of gossip following Jolyon Jnr.'s departure. Irene admits to mourning the life she was promised. Jolyon Jnr. and Soames argue.

=== Series 2 (2026) ===
No.	Title	Directed by	Written by	Original release date	Viasat Epic Drama premiere
7	"2.1"	Meenu Gaur	Debbie Horsfield & John Galsworthy	22 October 2026	13 September 2026
Soames dreams of fatherhood as Jolyon Jnr attempts reconciliation with the Forsytes. Despite tensions, Louisa suggests they remain in London, while Irene seeks advice.
8	"2.2"	Meenu Gaur	Debbie Horsfield & John Galsworthy	22 October 2026	20 September 2026
Irene deceives Soames by avoiding pregnancy, Soames admits that he ruined the Herons. Jolyon Jnr faces Forsyte rejection, and tensions surface at Elijah's christening.
9	"2.3"	Meenu Gaur	Debbie Horsfield & John Galsworthy	22 October 2026	27 September 2026
Irene navigates public scrutiny, Jolyon Jnr rejects his family fortune, and Soames seizes control, igniting financial, personal, and moral tensions within the family.
10	"2.4"	Andy Newbery	Debbie Horsfield & John Galsworthy	22 October 2026	4 October 2026
Ambitions, romance, and family tensions escalate as sickness and jealousy ripple through Forsyte lives, culminating in a sudden, devastating loss.
11	"2.5"	Andy Newbery	Debbie Horsfield & John Galsworthy	22 October 2026	11 October 2026
In the wake of Louisa's death, fractured loyalties and forbidden desires threaten the Forsytes' fragile unity, as business, love, and legacy collide with devastating consequences.
12	"2.6"	Andy Newbery	Debbie Horsfield & John Galsworthy	22 October 2026	18 October 2026
Jolyon Snr rewrites his will, family tensions simmer. Phil oversteps, June faces a painful realisation, and Irene attempts to break free from Soames's control.

== Production ==
=== Development ===
This adaptation is written by Debbie Horsfield with Meenu Gaur and Annetta Laufer both directing episodes in series 1 and Andy Newbery directing three episodes in series 2. Sheena Bucktowonsing and Debbie Horsfield, Meenu Gaur, Damien Timmer and Susanne Simpson are executive producers. It is the third television adaptation of The Forsyte Saga novels by John Galsworthy, after a version which aired on the BBC in 1967 and a second 35 years later on ITV.

In October 2026, it was revealed that the third series, expected to air sometime in late 2027, will follow the Forsyte family to the French Riviera for a family holiday. According to Deadline and reported by TV Guide, the third series will consist of only three episodes as opposed to the usual six. Damien Timmer, CCO of Mammoth Screen, said, "It’s a grand tour that takes in Paris, the Italian countryside and the glamorous world of the French Riviera. Love is lost and found, new relationships are formed and incendiary secrets are unearthed – the family will never be the same again!"

=== Cast ===
An ensemble cast includes Eleanor Tomlinson, Jack Davenport, Millie Gibson, Stephen Moyer, Joshua Orpin, Tuppence Middleton, Francesca Annis, Jamie Flatters and Susan Hampshire. Hampshire, who starred as Fleur Forsyte in the original 1960s series, was cast as the dowager Lady Carteret. More casting, including Fiona Button as Clarissa Heron and Naomi Frederick as Emily Forsyte, was announced in June 2024. Richard Rankin and Nia Ashi were cast as Sir Hugo Carteret and Alicia Cole in the second and third season. Sarah Alexander was also cast in the second season as Jolyon Snr.'s former lover Alexandra.

Gregg Sulkin and Gabriel Antunes have been cast in the third season in roles still yet to be revealed.

=== Filming ===
Filming started in Bristol in May 2024, with filming locations including Christmas Steps, Bristol, Wales, and Italy. Returning to Bristol, the second series was filmed in summer 2025, beginning in June. Series 3 started production in May 2026 in and around Opatija, Croatia before wrapping in July.

== Broadcast ==
It was broadcast in the United Kingdom on 5 on 20 October 2025. In the United States, the series premiered on 22 March 2026 on the drama anthology series Masterpiece on PBS. In Spain and Andorra, it can be watched on Movistar Plus+. It can also be seen on ABCiView (Australia), TVNZ (New Zealand), ZDF (Germany), Virgin Media Ireland (ROI), SVT (Sweden), YLE (Finland), DR (Denmark), NRK (Norway), Tet (Latvia), HRT (Croatia), and HOT and Yes TV (Israel).

The second series premiered on 11 September 2026 on Movistar Plus+ in Spain and on 13 September 2026, on Viasat Epic Drama in participating European countries. Australia began streaming the second series on 11 October 2026. It became available to stream on 5 in the United Kingdom from 22 October 2026. It will premiere on PBS in the United States on 28 March 2027.

== Reception ==
On Rotten Tomatoes, series 1 received a 77% approval rating based on 13 critic reviews. Metacritic, which uses a weighted average, assigned series one a score of 59 out of 100 based on 10 critics, indicating "mixed or average reviews".

In The Times, the critic Rod Liddle described the series as a form of "boomer escapism", while praising its nostalgic appeal, meticulous period recreation, and traditional approach to family drama. Also Carol Midgley described the series as a lavish period drama that updates John Galsworthy's novel with a greater emphasis on its female characters. However, she noted that the opening episode relied too heavily on exposition and narration before the story gained momentum.

== Awards and nominations ==
Year	Award	Category	Nominee(s)	Result	Ref.
2027	TV Choice Awards	Best New Drama	The Forsytes	Longlisted	
2027	TV Choice Awards	Best Drama Performance	Jack Davenport	Longlisted	
2027	TV Choice Awards	Best Drama Performance	Francesca Annis	Longlisted	
