= The Forsyte Saga =

Three novels by John Galsworthy

- Author: John Galsworthy
- Genre: Novel
- Publisher: William Heinemann Ltd
- Publication date: 1906–1921 (serialised)

The Forsyte Saga, first published under that title in 1922, is a series of three novels and two interludes published between 1906 and 1921 by the English author John Galsworthy, who won the 1932 Nobel Prize in Literature. They chronicle the vicissitudes of the leading members of a large upper-middle-class English family that is similar to Galsworthy's own. Its members, who are only a few generations removed from their farmer ancestors, are keenly aware of their status as "new money". The main character, the solicitor and connoisseur Soames Forsyte, sees himself as a "man of property" by virtue of his ability to accumulate material possessions, but that status does not succeed in bringing him pleasure. In 2003, The Forsyte Saga was listed as No. 123 in the BBC's The Big Read poll of the UK's "best-loved novel".

Separate sections of the saga, as well as the lengthy story in its entirety, have been adapted for cinema and television. The Man of Property, the first book, was adapted in 1949 by Hollywood as That Forsyte Woman, starring Errol Flynn, Greer Garson, Walter Pidgeon and Robert Young. In 1967, the BBC produced a popular 26-part serial that dramatised The Forsyte Saga and the sequel trilogy A Modern Comedy, which starred Eric Porter, Nyree Dawn Porter, and Kenneth More. In 2002, Granada Television produced two series for the ITV network: The Forsyte Saga and The Forsyte Saga: To Let, starring Damian Lewis, Gina McKee, and Rupert Graves. In 2024, a third television adaptation was commissioned by Channel 5 and Masterpiece PBS, starring Joshua Orpin, Millie Gibson, and Danny Griffin. The first series was broadcast in the UK in 2025.

Following The Forsyte Saga, Galsworthy wrote two more trilogies and several more interludes based around the titular family. The resulting series is collectively titled The Forsyte Chronicles.

== Text ==
=== The Man of Property (1906) ===
The first volume opens by introducing us to an array of Forsytes, outlining alliances and rivalries. The story quickly focuses on the unhappy marriage of Soames Forsyte and Irene. (The character of Irene is based upon Galsworthy's wife Ada Galsworthy.) Soames is jealous of Irene's London friendships and independence. To establish his control, he devises a plan to be the first Forsyte to live in a country house. He identifies a property at Robin Hill, which will isolate Irene. He engages Philip Bosinney, an artistically inclined architect, to design the house, manage its construction, and furnish it. Irene falls in love with Bosinney and they begin an affair, although he is affianced to June, the daughter of another Forsyte, one of Soames' cousins. The rivalry between two Forsyte brothers serves as a counterpoint to the main plot, with James, father of Soames, heading one line and Old Jolyon, grandfather of June the other. Old Jolyon has suffered for years by acceding to the other Forsytes in ostracizing his son Young Jolyon, for deserting his wife years ago. He now decides to rewrite his will and recognize his son as his heir. Irene, though without means of support, deserts Soames just as he wins his lawsuit against Bosinney, bankrupting him. Bosinney, distraught and desperate, dies in a bus accident on a foggy night, as June persuades her grandfather to buy the Robin Hill house so he can live there with his son's family.

=== "Indian Summer of a Forsyte" (1918) ===
Old Jolyon enjoys an idyllic summer at Robin Hill with his younger grandchildren while his son Young Jolyon tours Spain with his wife and daughter June. He happens upon Irene, who visits the property to evoke memories of her time there with Bosinney. She visits several times and Old Jolyon visits her in Chelsea and takes her to dinner and the opera. He meditates upon his life's achievements and struggles with the onset of old age. He modifies his will to include a bequest for Irene, with Young Jolyon as trustee. Old Jolyon dies under the ancient oak in the garden of the Robin Hill.

=== In Chancery (1920) ===
The marital discord of both Soames and his sister Winifred is the subject of the second novel (the title refers to the Court of Chancery, which dealt with domestic issues). They take steps to divorce their spouses, Irene and Montague Dartie respectively. While Soames tells his sister to brave the consequences of going to court, he is unwilling to go through a divorce. Instead he stalks and hounds Irene, follows her abroad, and asks her to have his child, which was his father's wish.

Irene inherits £15,000 after Old Jolyon's death. His son, Young Jolyon, also Soames's cousin, manages Irene's finances. When she first leaves Soames, Young Jolyon offers his support. By the time his son Jolly dies in the South African War, Irene has developed a strong friendship with Jolyon. Soames then confronts Young Jolyon and Irene at Robin Hill, falsely accusing them of having an affair. Young Jolyon and Irene assert that they have had an affair because Soames has it in his mind already. This statement gives Soames the evidence he needs for divorce proceedings. That confrontation sparks a consummation between young Jolyon and Irene, leading to their marriage once the divorce is final and the birth of a son Jolyon "Jon" Forsyte. Soames marries Annette, the young daughter of a French restaurant owner. With his new wife, he has his only child, a daughter they name Fleur.

=== "Awakening" (1920) ===
This second interlude explores the naive and exuberant lifestyle of eight-year-old Jon Forsyte. He loves and is loved by his parents. He has an idyllic youth, and his every desire is indulged. This interlude serves as a demonstration of Jon's devotion to his mother when it comes to the decision he must make in To Let.

=== To Let (1921) ===
This novel concludes the Forsyte Saga. Second cousins Fleur and Jon Forsyte meet and fall in love, ignorant of their parents' past troubles, indiscretions and misdeeds. Once Soames, Jolyon, and Irene discover their romance, they forbid their children to see each other again. Irene and Jolyon also fear that Fleur is too much like her father, and once she has Jon in her grasp, will want to possess him entirely. Despite her feelings for Jon, Fleur has a very suitable suitor, Michael Mont – heir to a baronetcy – who has fallen in love with her. If they marry, Fleur would elevate the status of her family from nouveau riche to the aristocratic upper-class. The title derives from Soames' reflections as he breaks up the house in which his Uncle Timothy – recently deceased in 1920 at the age of 101 and the last of the older generation of Forsytes – had lived a recluse, hoarding his life like property.

Knowing he is soon to die from a weak heart, Jolyon writes a letter to Jon, detailing the events of Irene's marriage to Soames, including her love affair with Philip Bosinney and Soames' rape of her and warns him that Irene would be alone if he were to marry Fleur. But while Jon reads the letter, Jolyon suddenly dies of a heart attack, and Jon is left torn between the past and his present love for Fleur. Soames comes to visit Irene to discuss the potential engagement between his daughter and her son and she declares it to be Jon's decision to make. Before leaving, he offers to shake her hand to put the past behind them but she does not respond. Jon witnesses the almost-catatonic state of fear that Fleur's father still puts his mother into and he ultimately rejects Fleur, breaking his own heart as well as hers, and leaves for Canada. Fleur marries Michael Mont, though she does not love him. With her marriage, Soames is separated from the only person whom he has truly loved. Irene later follows Jon to Canada, selling the house at Robin Hill.

== Principal characters ==
=== The old Forsytes ===
They are ten siblings, six men and four women.

- Ann, the eldest of the family, never married
- Old Jolyon, the eldest brother, made a fortune in tea, and the father of Jo
- James, a solicitor, married to Emily and the father of Soames and his sisters
- Swithin, James's twin brother, a bachelor with aristocratic pretensions
- Roger, "the original Forsyte", who hosts the dance where Irene dances with Philip
- Julia (Juley), Mrs. Septimus Small, married for a few years, now a widow
- Hester, never married
- Nicholas, the wealthiest in the family
- Timothy, a lifelong bachelor, noted for his caution
- Susan, married to, and lives with, Mr. Hayman

=== The young Forsytes (the old Forsytes' children) ===
Old Jolyon's

- Young Jolyon (Jo), Old Jolyon's artistic and free-thinking son, married three times
  - Frances Crisson, his first wife who he abandons for his daughter's governess
  - Helène Hilmer, his mistress and then second wife after Frances has died
  - Irene Heron, Soames' first wife, who he then divorces after twelve years of separation, becomes Young Jolyon's third wife and widow

James'

- Soames, son of James and Emily, an intense, unimaginative and possessive solicitor and art collector
  - his wife Irene Heron, who has an affair with Bosinney and later marries Young Jolyon
  - his second wife Annette Lamotte, a shopgirl
- Winifred, married to the foppish Montague Dartie, who is financially dependent on his father-in-law
- Rachel
- Cicely

Roger's

- Young Roger, Roger's eldest son
- George, Roger's son, expert at mockery and lifelong bachelor
- Francie, Roger's daughter, skilled and published musician
- Eustace and Thomas, Roger's youngest sons

=== The young Forsytes' children ===
Young Jolyon's

- June, Frances' daughter; independent, lives with her grandfather Old Jolyon, betrothed to Bosinney and jilted
- Jolyon "Jolly", Helène's son who dies in the Boer War
- Holly, Helène's daughter who marries her cousin Val
- Jolyon "Jon", Irene's son and Fleur's lover
  - Anne Wilmot, his friend's sister with whom he falls in love and marries in the sequels

Soames'

- Fleur, Annette's daughter, who falls in love with Jon and eventually marries the heir of a baronet

Winifred's

- Val, who resents his father and marries his cousin Holly
- Imogen
- Maud
- Benedict

=== Others ===
- Philip Bosinney, architect, June's fiancé and Irene's lover, hired and then sued by Soames
  - Mrs. Baines, his aunt
- Mrs. MacAnder, a busybody and gossip
- Prosper Profond, Winifred's admirer and Annette's lover
- Michael Mont, the heir to a baronet who falls in love and marries Fleur
  - Sir Lawrence "Bart" Mont, his father
  - Wilfred Desert, his best friend who falls in love, and engages in flirtation, with Fleur

== Themes ==
=== Duty versus Desire ===
Young Jolyon was the favourite of the family until he left his wife for his daughter's governess. He eschews his status in society and in the Forsyte clan to follow his heart. Soames, though it seems he is the polar opposite of Jolyon, has those same inclinations toward doing what he desires. For example, instead of finding a wife who is rich, he marries Irene and then Annette, who have neither money nor status. When he takes Irene to a play about a married woman and her lover, he ironically sympathizes with the lover and not the husband. However, most of his decisions are on the side of duty.

=== Generations and Change ===
The many generations of the Forsyte clan remind everyone of what has come to pass over the years. However, as the old ranks begin to die, people are able to change. For example, after a few generations, the fact that they are nouveau riche does not matter as much. This is also the case with Soames and Irene's marital problems. Once they grow old and their children can overcome their parents' past, Soames can finally let go of the past. Another change with generations is the diminished number of Forsyte offspring. Many of the second generation have fewer children.

== Sequels ==
Works within the Forsyte Chronicles

Galsworthy's sequel to The Forsyte Saga was A Modern Comedy, a trilogy written between 1924 and 1928. It comprises the novel The White Monkey; an interlude, A Silent Wooing; a second novel, The Silver Spoon; a second interlude, Passers By; and a third novel, Swan Song. The principal characters are Soames and Fleur, and the second saga ends with the death of Soames in 1926.

=== The White Monkey (1924) ===
Fleur Forsyte has settled into married life with Michael Mont, following her aborted romance with Jon Forsyte. Unbeknownst to Michael, his best friend Wilfred Desert has also fallen in love with Fleur. Fleur seems to treat Wilfred’s affection as an amusement in her otherwise dull life.

Michael works for a publishing firm and catches one of his employees, Bickett, stealing books and is forced to fire him. Feeling bad for a man who was trying to help his sick wife, Michael helps Bickett’s wife Victorine gain a job posing as a nude model for various artists. Victorine eventually gains enough money for the two of them to move to Australia.

Soames Forsyte, Fleur’s father, is on the board of a company with extensive capital invested overseas. A young man comes to him and advises that he has overheard that the Chairman of the Board, Mr Emerson, has been taking commissions to invest in failing stock, losing a considerable amount of the shareholders’ money in the process. Soames and Lawrence Mont, Michael’s father, attempt to bring this to the attention of the Board but are too late to stop Mr Emerson escaping prosecution. They both resign in protest.

Soames also visits his cousin George shortly before his death and secures a Chinese painting, the titular ‘White Monkey’. He gives the painting to Fleur and Michael.

Eventually, Wilfred tires of Fleur tormenting him and leaves to go to the East. A depressed Fleur turns to Michael and falls pregnant and eventually gives birth to a son, Christopher (or Kit).

=== A Silent Wooing (Interlude 1927) ===
In America, Jon goes on a picnic with his friend Francis Wilmot and meets his sister Anne. Anne and Jon go to explore an Indian mound and become lost, returning hours later. Jon then visits Francis and Anne at home and falls in love with her. They eventually marry.

=== The Silver Spoon (1926) ===
The book focuses mainly on Michael Mont’s political career, and Fleur’s social activities. Jon Forsyte’s brother-in-law, Francis Wilmot, arrives in London, staying with Fleur and Michael. He attends one of Fleur’s evening parties, and is smitten with Marjorie Ferrar, grand-daughter of the Marquess of Shropshire, and a lively member of a ‘fast set’.

Soames overhears her talking disparagingly about Fleur, and strong words are exchanged. Fleur writes some injudicious letters about the incident, and Marjorie is persuaded to launch a libel action. Soames, Sir Lawrence Mont and Lord Shropshire attempt to mediate, but in vain, and neither party will back down.

Michael chucks publishing, and launches his political career. His maiden speech promotes a scheme known as ‘Foggartism’, which advocates a policy of child migration to the Dominions. He also attempts to assist a group of ‘down-and-outs’, but the project only partly succeeds. He has a run-in with Marjorie’s fiancée, Sir Alexander McGown, a fiery Scottish MP.

The libel case comes to court. As a result of legal manoeuvering by Soames, Marjorie’s views on modern morality, including the reading of ‘advanced literature’, are aired in public. She defends her opinions bravely, but is persuaded to quietly settle out of court, without an apology from Fleur.

Now deeply in debt, and refusing to disclose her various love affairs to McGown, he breaks their engagement. Lord Shropshire offers to pay her debts, on her word as a lady to pay cash for her needs in future.

Marjorie is now the toast of her set, and Fleur is humiliated. She asks Michael to take her ‘around the world’. She and Soames decide to go together, with Michael joining them later, when Parliament rises.

=== Passers-By (Interlude 1927) ===
Soames is in the final days of his holiday with Fleur and Michael in Washington when he becomes aware that Jon, Anne and Irene Forsyte are in town and staying at the same hotel. He works to ensure Fleur remains unaware of their existence, though he cannot stop himself from spying on Irene playing the piano. They return to England with only Soames aware of the near encounter.

=== Swan Song (1928) ===
The General Strike is called. Many Forsytes enrol as special constables. Michael Mont’s sympathies are with the strikers, but he can do nothing to help. Fleur takes over the running of a canteen for the volunteers who will keep the trains running. Holly joins her, as well as Anne, Jon’s wife. Jon volunteers to stoke an engine; he eats at the canteen, but he and Fleur do not meet. Anne and Jon decide to stay in England, and buy a farm in Sussex.

Disillusioned with Foggartism, Michael is drawn into a scheme promoted by his uncle, Rev. Hilary Charwell, to buy and convert the worst of the London slums. He and his father help to set up the Fund, and recruit rich and influential men to invest in the scheme. Soames is co-opted as legal advisor.

Michael visits June Forsyte, who tells him the story of Fleur and Jon’s affair, and something of the tangled family history, which he hadn’t previously known.

Val Dartie is visited by an old college pal, Stainforth, now fallen on hard times, who claims to know something about an employee at Val’s racehorse stables, and offers to sell him the information. He later forges Val’s name on a cheque.

Fleur sets up a rest home in the country for working girls, but it’s really an excuse to be close to Jon. She schemes to arrange ‘accidental’ meetings. Jon and Fleur have one last fling, but when Anne becomes pregnant, he breaks it off. Fleur is devastated.

A fire breaks out in Soames’ house, almost certainly started accidentally by Fleur. Most of the pictures are saved, but a heavy painting falls and hits Soames as he tries to rescue Fleur. He is badly injured, and dies a few days later.

=== Later works ===
Galsworthy wrote one further trilogy, End of the Chapter, comprising Maid in Waiting, Flowering Wilderness, and Over the River (also known as One More River), chiefly dealing with Michael Mont's young cousin, Dinny Cherrell.

The three trilogies have been republished under the collective title of The Forsyte Chronicles.

In 1930 Galsworthy published On Forsyte 'Change, which deals in the main with the older Forsytes before the events chronicled in The Man of Property. Galsworthy states in a foreword that "They have all been written since Swan Song was finished but in place they come between the Saga and the Comedy ..." By way of explanation he writes that "It is hard to part suddenly and finally from those with whom one has lived so long; and these footnotes do really, I think, help to fill in and round out the chronicles of the Forsyte family."

Contents

1. The Buckles of Superior Dosset, 1821–63
2. Sands of Time, 1821–63
3. Hester's Little Tour, 1845
4. Tiimothy's Narrow Squeak, 1851
5. Aunt Juley's Courtship, 1855
6. Nicholas Rex, 1864
7. A Sad Affair, 1867
8. Revolt at Roger's, 1870
9. June's First Lame Duck, 1876
10. Dog at Timothy's, 1878
11. Midsummer Madness, 1880
12. The Hondekoeter, 1880
13. Cry of Peacock, 1883
14. Francie's Fourpenny Foreigner, 1888
15. Four-In-Hand Forsyte, 1890
16. The Sorrows of Tweetyman, 1895
17. The Dromios, 1900
18. A Forsyte Encounters the People, 1917
19. Soames and the Flag, 1914–1918

In 1994, Suleika Dawson published a sequel to The Forsytes, titled The Forsytes: The Saga Continues, in which Soames's daughter Fleur, Lady Mont, is the main character. She has been a dutiful wife and mother, and has long forgotten her love for Jon Forsyte, but when tragedy brings Jon back to England, Fleur is determined to recapture the past and the love of her life.

== Awards ==
The Forsyte Saga earned John Galsworthy the Nobel Prize for Literature in 1932.

== Dedication ==
A framed letter from Galsworthy stood next to his wife's bed until her death. It read, "I super-dedicate in its entirety The Forsyte Saga whose first word was written on Campden Hill, London of a May morning in 1903 and whose last word was written at Hampstead on 15 August 1920. Of all my work I have most enjoyed the making of this chronicle, and on the whole set more store by it than anything else I have written up to now. This is why I super-dedicate the whole of it to one without whose instigation, sympathy, interest and criticism, my obscure inner necessity might never have pushed through the mufflement of circumstance and made me a writer – such as I am." (1921)

== Adaptations ==
=== In film and television ===
==== 1920s silent films ====
Three silent films based on the saga were released in the 1920s. The first two, released in 1920 and 1922, are lost films, with no recorded footage available to date. Released in 1925, a third silent film, The White Monkey, has some surviving footage, with an incomplete print located at the Library of Congress and the Wisconsin Center for Film and Theater Research.

==== That Forsyte Woman (1949 film) ====
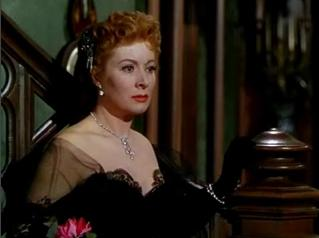
Greer Garson as Irene Heron in That Forsyte Woman (1949).

A 1949 film adaptation, called That Forsyte Woman in its United States release, starred Errol Flynn as Soames, Greer Garson as Irene, Walter Pidgeon as Young Jolyon, and Robert Young as Philip Bosinney. This adaptation took major liberties with the source material to centre on Irene and the men who fell in love with her. It was very poorly received as an adaptation and has since been overshadowed by the BBC and ITV adaptations that came in the 1960s and 2000s.

==== The Forsyte Saga (1967 TV series) ====
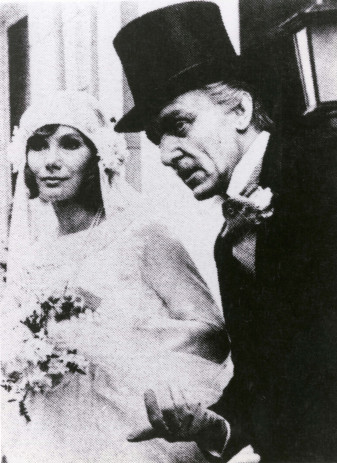
Susan Hampshire and Eric Porter as Fleur and Soames Forsyte in the 1967 BBC television adaptation of The Forsyte Saga.

A television adaptation by the BBC of The Forsyte Saga, and its sequel trilogy A Modern Comedy, starred Eric Porter as Soames, Joseph O'Conor as Old Jolyon, Susan Hampshire as Fleur, Kenneth More as Young Jolyon and Nyree Dawn Porter as Irene. It was produced by Donald Wilson and was shown in 26 episodes on Saturday evenings between 7 January and 1 July 1967 on BBC2. It was the repeat on Sunday evenings on BBC1 starting on 8 September 1968 that secured the programme's success, with 18 million tuning in for the final episode in 1969. It was shown in the United States on public television and broadcast all over the world, and became the first British television programme to be sold to the Soviet Union.

==== The Forsyte Saga (2002 miniseries) ====
In 2002, the first two books and the first interlude were adapted by Granada Television for the ITV network, although, like the 1967 production, the miniseries took many liberties with Galsworthy's original work. Additional funding for this production was provided by American PBS station WGBH, as a result of the BBC version having been a success on PBS in the early 1970s.

==== The Forsyte Saga: To Let (2003 miniseries) ====
Immediately following the success of the 2002 adaptation, a second series was released in 2003. It portrays the saga's last book To Let. Much of the cast resumed their roles, but most of the first generation of Forsytes had died in the previous series. The principal characters played by Damian Lewis, Gina McKee, Rupert Graves, and Amanda Root return. The series has also been released on DVD and released in the United States as part of Masterpiece Theatre.

==== The Forsytes (2025–present TV series) ====
A new interpretation, this time re-centring the saga on the female characters who are often voiceless in the text, is written by Poldark creator Debbie Horsfield. The series is led by Joshua Orpin, Millie Gibson, and Danny Griffin as Soames, Irene, and Jo, accompanied by an ensemble cast which includes Francesca Annis, Jack Davenport, Tuppence Middleton, Stephen Moyer, and Eleanor Tomlinson. The first series was broadcast in the United Kingdom on Channel 5 in October 2025. A second series, adapting The Man of Property, premiered in September 2026. A third series is expected to release in 2027.

=== On stage ===
In October 2024, a two-part stage adaptation (Part 1: Irene and Part 2: Fleur) premiered at the Park Theatre, London, bringing unheard female voices to the fore. The two parts were adapted for stage by Shaun Mckenna and Lin Coghlan, starring Fiona Hampton, Joseph Millson, and Flora Spencer-Longhurst. The production was revived in November 2025 by the Royal Shakespeare Company at the Swan Theatre, Stratford-upon-Avon.

=== Radio adaptations ===
There have been various BBC radio dramatisations. Probably the earliest was a radio production of The Man of Property in 11 weekly parts, commencing on 9 December 1945 on the BBC Home Service. The music used as the opening and closing theme came from Edward Elgar's Enigma Variations, specifically the Nimrod variation. This adaptation starred Leo Genn as Jo, Grizelda Hervey as Irene and Ronald Simpson as Soames. It was adapted by Muriel Levy and produced by Val Gielgud and Felix Felton. Young Jolyons in later adaptations included Andrew Cruickshank, Leo Genn and Guy Rolfe. Another production of the dramatised cycle, which had Rachel Gurney as Irene, Noel Johnson as Young Jolyon and Alan Wheatley as Soames, came soon after the 1967 television series. The version broadcast in 1990 comprised a 75-minute opening episode followed by 22 hour-long episodes, entitled The Forsyte Chronicles. It was the most expensive radio drama serial ever broadcast, due to its length and its big-name cast, which included Dirk Bogarde, Diana Quick, Michael Williams and Alan Howard. This radio series was rerun on BBC 7 radio in 2004, and has been released commercially.

==== The Forsytes (2016–2017) ====
In January 2016, BBC Radio 4 began broadcasting a new radio adaptation by Shaun McKenna and Lin Coghlan under the title The Forsytes, broken into four parts. The cast was led by Joseph Millson as Soames, Jessica Raine as Fleur, Juliet Aubrey as Irene, Harry Hadden-Paton as Bosinney and Ewan Bailey as Young Jolyon. It was directed by Marion Nancarrow and Gemma Jenkins.

The Forsytes (7 episodes), first broadcast in February 2016, adapted The Man of Property to In Chancery. In April, The Forsytes Continues (7 episodes) adapted "Awakening", To Let and The White Monkey. The Forsytes Returns (7 episodes), broadcast in September 2016, covered "A Silent Wooing", The Silver Spoon, "Passers-By" and Swan Song. The Forsytes Concludes (8 episodes), broadcast in May 2017, adapted the final three novels in the series, Maid in Waiting, Flowering Wilderness and Over the River, with Nina Sosanya playing Dinny.
