= Naomi Frederick =

English actress

- Born: London, England
- Occupation: Actress
- Years active: 2002–present

Naomi Frederick is an English actress and graduate of the Royal Academy of Dramatic Arts. She is notable for stage work and has also appeared on radio, appearing in 2012 adaptations of Twelfth Night and Sparkling Cyanide. Her television work includes "Eagle Day", a 2002 episode of Foyle's War. In 2015, she appeared as Juana Inés de la Cruz in the Shakespeare's Globe production of Helen Edmundson's The Heresy of Love.

== Career ==
=== Film ===
Year	Title	Role	Notes
2017	The Children Act	Amanda	
2019	The Aftermath	Celia	
2021	Father Christmas Is Back	Paulina	

=== Television ===
Year	Title	Role	Notes
2002	The Inspector Lynley Mysteries	Elizabeth	Episode: "Payment in Blood"
2002	Fields of Gold		TV movie
2002	Foyle's War	Anne Roberts	Episode: "Eagle Day"
2002–2011	My Family	Various	"Misery", "Owed to Susan", 1 other
2007	The Trial of Tony Blair	Zoe	TV movie
2007	Holby City	Louisa Berg	Episode: "Face Value"
2010	On Expenses	Personal Assistant	TV movie
2010	Doctors	Laura Birks	Episode: "6 Underground"
2013	Casualty	Grace Fraser	Episode: "Between the Cracks"
2017	Inspector George Gently	Adele Watson	Episode: "Gently and the New Age"
2020	EastEnders	Dr Baise	1 episode
2020	Belgravia	Duchess of Bedford	2 episodes
2025-present	The Forsytes	Emily Forsyte	Main cast; 12 episodes

=== Theatre ===
Year	Title	Role	Notes
2002	Three Sisters by Anton Chekhov	Carol	Nuffield Theatre, Southampton for which she was nominated for the Ian Charleson Award
2002	Time and the Conways by J. B. Priestley	Carol	Royal Exchange, Manchester, Manchester winning a MEN Award that year as Best Newcomer
2004	Measure for Measure by William Shakespeare	Isabella	Royal National Theatre, London
2008	Brief Encounter by Noël Coward	Laura	Royal National Theatre, London
2009	Mrs Affleck a reworking of Little Eyolf by Samuel Adamson	Audrey Affleck	Royal National Theatre, London
2009	As You Like It by William Shakespeare	Rosalind	Shakespeare's Globe, London
2013	The Winslow Boy by Terence Rattigan	Catherine Winslow	Old Vic Theatre, London
2014	Made in Dagenham by David Arnold and Richard Thomas	Lisa Hopkins	Adelphi Theatre, London
2015	The Heresy of Love by Helen Edmundson	Sor Juana	Shakespeare's Globe, London
2018	Agnes Colander – An Attempt At Life by Harley Granville Barker	Agnes Colander	Theatre Royal Bath and Jermyn Street Theatre (2018)
2026	The Standard of Living	Virginia Woolf	Theatre Royal Haymarket
