= The Heresy of Love =

Play

The Heresy of Love is a 2012 play by the British playwright Helen Edmundson, based on the life of Juana Inés de la Cruz. It was premiered by the Royal Shakespeare Company in early 2012, with a cast including Ray Coulthard and directed by Nancy Meckler. It was later produced at Shakespeare's Globe from July to September 2015. directed by John Dove.

== Casts ==
| Character | RSC | Globe |
|---|---|---|
| Angelica | Sarah Ovens | Gwyneth Keyworth |
| Archbishop Aguiar | Stephen Boxer | Phil Whitchurch |
| Bishop Santa Cruz | Raymond Coulthard | Anthony Howell |
| Brigida | Marty Cruickshank | Susan Porrett |
| Don Hernando | Simon Thorp | Gary Shelford |
| Fray Antonio | Geoffrey Beevers | Patrick Driver |
| Juanita | Dona Croll | Sophia Nomvete |
| Madre Marguerita | Diana Kent | Gabrielle Lloyd |
| Sor Juana | Catherine McCormack | Naomi Frederick |
| Sor Sebastiana | Teresa Banham | Rhiannon Oliver |
| Vicereine | Catherine Hamilton | Ellie Piercy |
| Viceroy | Daniel Stewart | William Mannering |
