= Painter (upcoming film) =

American action film

- Directed by: Garrett Warren
- Written by: Derek Kolstad
- Produced by: Derek Kolstad; Drew Simon; Josh Adler; Sam Speiser
- Starring: Amber Midthunder; Walton Goggins; Florian Munteanu; Daniel Bernhardt; Claes Bang; Ving Rhames
- Production companies: 20th Century Studios; Infrared Pictures; Circle M+P; Lightstorm Entertainment
- Distributed by: Hulu
- Country: United States
- Language: English

Painter is an upcoming American action film directed by Garrett Warren and written by Derek Kolstad. It stars Amber Midthunder, Walton Goggins, Florian Munteanu, and Daniel Bernhardt.

== Cast ==
- Amber Midthunder
- Walton Goggins
- Florian Munteanu
- Daniel Bernhardt
- Ving Rhames
- Claes Bang
- Joshua Orpin
- Matthew Needham

== Premise ==
A young woman from Appalachia must enter the world of international espionage when her adoptive father is kidnapped.

== Production ==
In October 2024, it was announced that Alan Ritchson and Amber Midthunder would star in Painter, written by Derek Kolstad and to be directed by Garrett Warren. A year later, Ritchson dropped out of the project due to scheduling conflicts, while 20th Century Studios purchased the film, and James Cameron became an executive producer. Further casting updates to join Midthunder included Walton Goggins, Florian Munteanu, and Daniel Bernhardt, followed by Ving Rhames, Claes Bang, Joshua Orpin, and Matthew Needham.

Principal photography began in October 2025 in Serbia. Filming wrapped in December 2025.

== Release ==
Painter is scheduled to be released on Hulu.
