= Joshua Orpin =

Australian actor (born 1994)

- Born: 15 April 1994 (age 32); Melbourne, Australia
- Education: Western Australian Academy of Performing Arts
- Occupation: Actor
- Known for: Titans; Home and Away
- Partner: Asha Rosie Khan (2014–present)

Joshua Orpin (born 15 April 1994) is an Australian actor. On television, he is known for his roles in the DC Universe series Titans (2019–2023), the Seven Network soap opera Home and Away (2024–) and the 5 series The Forsytes (2025–).

== Early life ==
Orpin was born and raised in Melbourne. He attended the Western Australian Academy of Performing Arts between 2015 and 2017.

== Career ==
Orpin appeared in The Neon Spectrum, and The Blake Mysteries. He played Conner Kent, also known as Superboy, in the 2019 second season onwards of Titans, a DC Universe action-adventure series on HBO Max.

In 2024, Orpin appeared in the long-running Seven Network soap opera Home and Away as Rory. Also in 2024, he was cast as the male lead, Soames, in the 5 and Masterpiece adaptation of The Forsyte Saga opposite English actress Millie Gibson as Irene. The first series was broadcast in the UK in October and November 2025, with two more series filmed and expected to air in Autumn 2026 and 2027, respectively, with Orpin returning for both.

== Personal life ==
Orpin has been in a relationship with Asha Rosie Khan since 2014.

== Filmography ==
Key
†	Denotes films that have not yet been released

=== Film ===
Year	Title	Role	Notes	Ref.
2017	The Neon Spectrum	Axel		
2019	Highest Point	Damien		
2025	I Know What You Did Last Summer	Wyatt		
TBA	Painter †	TBA	Post-production	

=== Television ===
Year	Title	Role	Production	Notes	Ref.
2018	The Blake Mysteries	Peter Crowe	ABC/Seven Network	Episode: "Ghost Stories"	
2019	Preacher	Insecure Student	AMC	Episode: "Last Supper"	
2019	Upright	Matty	Fox Showcase	Episode: "Day Five"	
2019–2023	Titans	Conner Kent	HBO Max	Main cast (season 2–4)	
2021	Love Me	Kai	BINGE	Miniseries	
2024	Home and Away	Rory Templeton	Seven Network	12 episodes	
2025-present	The Forsytes	Soames Forsyte	5/Masterpiece	Lead role; 12 episodes	
