= Fate: The Winx Saga =

2021 teen drama television series

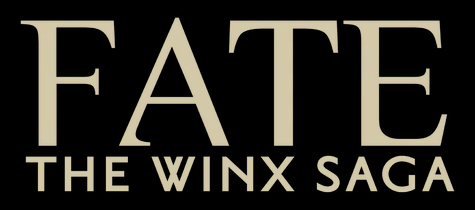
- Genre: Teen drama; Supernatural; Dark fantasy
- Created by: Brian Young
- Based on: Winx Club by Iginio Straffi
- Starring: Abigail Cowen; Hannah van der Westhuysen; Precious Mustapha; Eliot Salt; Elisha Applebaum; Danny Griffin; Sadie Soverall; Freddie Thorp; Eva Birthistle; Robert James-Collier; Eve Best; Lesley Sharp; Theo Graham; Jacob Dudman; Ken Duken; Brandon Grace; Éanna Hardwicke; Miranda Richardson; Paulina Chávez
- Composer: Anne Nikitin
- Countries of origin: United Kingdom; Italy
- Original language: English
- No. of seasons: 2
- No. of episodes: 13

Production
- Executive producers: Brian Young; Judy Counihan; Kris Thykier; Cristiana Buzzelli; Joanne Lee; Lis Steele
- Producers: Jon Finn; Macdara Kelleher; John Keville; Edmund Sampson
- Production location: Ireland
- Cinematography: Frida Wendel; Tim Fleming; Baz Irvine
- Editors: Laura Morrod; Mike Jones; Adam Green
- Running time: 47–55 minutes
- Production companies: Archery Pictures; Young Blood Productions; Rainbow S.p.A.

Original release
- Network: Netflix
- Release: 22 January 2021 – 16 September 2022

Fate: The Winx Saga is a supernatural teen drama television series based on the animated series Winx Club, created by Iginio Straffi. It is produced by Archery Pictures in association with Rainbow, a studio co-owned by Iginio Straffi and Viacom at the time. Developed by Brian Young, who also acts as the showrunner and executive producer, it stars Abigail Cowen, Hannah van der Westhuysen, Precious Mustapha, Eliot Salt and Elisha Applebaum.

Iginio Straffi first proposed a live-action version of Winx Club in 2011, after Viacom, owner of Nickelodeon, became a co-owner of his studio and started financing his projects. Before approving production on the series, Straffi gained experience with live-action television working as a producer for Nickelodeon's Club 57. Principal photography for Fate eventually began in September 2019 in Ireland.

Early in production, Nickelodeon's American crew members from the cartoon, including Bloom's voice actress, Molly Quinn, met with the Fate production team and reviewed the pilot script. Rainbow's Joanne Lee also oversaw the show as an executive producer. Apart from them, the crew behind Fate is entirely new to the Winx franchise, and the writers were recruited from teen dramas like The Vampire Diaries.

The series features an ensemble cast based on the characters of the animated show. The six-episode first season debuted on Netflix on 22 January 2021 and was watched by 57 million subscribers in the first 28 days of its release. In February 2021, the series was renewed for a second season, which was released on 16 September 2022. In November 2022, the series was canceled after two seasons.

The story resumed in the form of a series of graphic novels published by Mad Cave Studios, the first volume of which was released in July 2024.

== Premise ==
Bloom, a fairy with fire powers, enrolls at a magical boarding school in the Otherworld called Alfea. She shares a suite with Stella, a light fairy; Aisha, a water fairy; Terra, an earth fairy; and Musa, a mind fairy. With the help of her friends, Bloom starts to learn more about her past. Meanwhile, ancient creatures called the Burned Ones return to the Otherworld and threaten everyone at Alfea.

== Cast and characters ==
(L–R) Eliot Salt as Terra, Sadie Soverall as Beatrix, Hannah van der Westhuysen as Stella, Abigail Cowen as Bloom, Precious Mustapha as Aisha, Elisha Applebaum as Musa and Paulina Chávez as Flora.

=== Main ===
- Abigail Cowen as Bloom, a fire fairy with the power of the dragon flame who discovers that she is a changeling. She was raised on Earth by adoptive human parents until her powers manifest and she enrolls at Alfea to learn control and discover her origins.
- Hannah van der Westhuysen as Stella, a light fairy and the Princess of Solaria who was raised by her icy mother Queen Luna.
- Precious Mustapha as Aisha, a water fairy from Andros with a practical mindset, a moral compass and need to follow rules.
- Eliot Salt as Terra Harvey, an earth fairy with plant speciality. She was raised at Alfea and is knowledgeable about the Otherworld.
- Elisha Applebaum as Musa, a mind fairy who feels other people's emotions. She tries to keep emotional distance from others to avoid being overwhelmed by their thoughts.
- Danny Griffin as Sky, one of the most skilled specialists and the son of Andreas of Eraklyon. The star of his class, he was raised by specialist instructor Saul Silva.
- Sadie Soverall as Beatrix, an air fairy who can manipulate electricity. She is interested in Alfea's dark history and is Andreas' adoptive daughter.
- Freddie Thorp as Riven, a nonchalant and flirty specialist who is Sky's best friend.
- Eva Birthistle as Vanessa Peters, she is Bloom's human adoptive mother and is covered in burn scars because of an incident where Bloom lost control of her powers (season 1 (Note: Birthistle was only credited as "Starring" in the episodes she appeared in.))
- Robert James-Collier as Saul Silva, the specialist instructor at Alfea, and Sky's adoptive parent as well as mentor.
- Eve Best (Note: Best was credited as "Starring" in all of season one and the sixth episode of season two.) as Farah Dowling, the headmistress of Alfea and one of the most powerful fairies of the Otherworld whose main goal is to protect her students from threats beyond Alfea's boundary.
- Lesley Sharp (Note: Sharp was only credited as "Starring" in the episodes she appeared in.) (season 1) / Miranda Richardson (Note: Richardson was only credited as "Starring" in the episodes she appeared in.) as Rosalind Hale, the former headmistress of Alfea who plotted with Queen Luna and Andreas to take over the school again (season 2)
- Theo Graham as Dane, a first-year Specialist with a crush on Riven and Beatrix (main season 2; recurring season 1)
- Jacob Dudman as Sam Harvey, an earth fairy with the ability to phase through walls and objects. He is Terra's brother (main season 2; (Note: In season two, Dudman was only credited as "Starring" in the episodes he appeared in.) recurring season 1)
- Ken Duken as Andreas of Eraklyon, He is Saul's former friend, Sky's father and Beatrix's adoptive father (main season 2; (Note: In season two, Duken was only credited as "Starring" in the episodes he appeared in.) recurring season 1)
- Brandon Grace as Grey Owens, a specialist and a blood witch. Aisha temporarily dates him (season 2)
- Éanna Hardwicke as Sebastian Valtor, a former specialist and blood witch, Alfea graduate and Saul's friend (season 2)
- Paulina Chávez as Flora, an earth fairy with floral specialty who is Terra and Sam's cousin (season 2)

=== Recurring ===
- Josh Cowdery as Mike Peters, Vanessa's husband and Bloom's adoptive father (season 1)
- Alex Macqueen (season 1) / Daniel Betts (season 2) as Professor Ben Harvey, a botany teacher and greenhouse worker at Alfea, who is Terra's and Sam's father
- Kate Fleetwood as Queen Luna, the authoritarian queen of Solaria and Stella's mother
- Leah Minto as Kat, a specialist
- Sean Sagar as Marco, an air fairy and Alfea graduate who is now a teacher
- Sarah Jane Seymour as Noura, a specialist at Alfea
- Pom Boyd as Doris (season 1), the dinner lady at Alfea
- Harry Michell as Callum Hunter (season 1), Dowling's assistant
- Jayden Revri as Devin (season 2), a mind fairy who is attacked by scrapers
- JJ Battell as Luke (season 2), a specialist
- Shameem Ahmad as Bavani Selvarajah (season 2), commander of Solaria's royal army

== Episodes ==
=== Series overview ===
Series	Episodes	Originally released
1	6	22 January 2021
2	7	16 September 2022

=== Season 1 (2021) ===
No. overall	No. in season	Title	Directed by	Written by	Original release date
1	1	"To the Waters and the Wild"	Lisa James Larsson	Teleplay by : Brian Young	22 January 2021
A farmer goes outside to check on his livestock. He finds one dead and is then attacked by a strange entity. Bloom, a fire fairy from Earth, arrives at Alfea, a magical school of Fairies and Specialists. After running into Sky, Bloom meets up with Stella, her mentor, for a campus tour. Bloom then meets her roommates Aisha, Terra, and Musa. Bloom's parents are human, and they don't know about Alfea and that Bloom is a fairy. At the orientation party, Bloom goes into the woods alone to practice her magic but then loses control. Aisha finds Bloom and saves her from the flame. Seeing Bloom's power, Aisha theorizes that Bloom could be a changeling. Disturbed by this fact, Bloom leaves for her room where she finds Stella. Stella gives Bloom her ring, which can transfer Bloom to the First World. Bloom then comes back to Earth and has a call with her parents. When returning to the portal, she is attacked by a monstrous creature known as a Burned One. Bloom is then rescued by Headmistress Dowling, Aisha, Terra, and Musa, but she loses Stella's ring.
2	2	"No Strangers Here"	Lisa James Larsson	Speed Weed	22 January 2021
Bloom asks Dowling if she is a changeling and Dowling tells her that she doesn't know her birth parents but provides no additional answers, frustrating Bloom. When Stella gets to know that Bloom lost her ring, she manipulates Bloom, Terra, and Sky into helping her find it. Riven falls for a new mysterious student named Beatrix and they together make plans of sneaking into Dowling's office to discover what she is hiding. Meanwhile, Silva becomes injured by the Burned One while trying to capture it. Bloom and her friends find injured Silva outside the barrier and Terra tries to treat him. Bloom hears voices in her head and runs after the Burned One. Bloom and Aisha knock it out, allowing Bloom to take the ring back. Terra brings in the injured Silva and Beatrix tells Dowling that he was attacked by the burned one. Once Dowling leaves, Beatrix searches for and finds a secret room in Dowling's office.
3	3	"Heavy Mortal Hopes"	Hannah Quinn	Victoria Bata	22 January 2021
Bloom dreams of a woman telling her to look for her. She believes the woman is the fairy who left her on Earth. At Alfea, Bloom finds a picture of that woman and confronts Dowling about it. Dowling tells her that the woman is Rosalind, who was Dowling's mentor and is dead now and that she doesn't know how she is involved with Bloom. At the Specialists' party, Bloom gets to know from Riven that Stella blinded her best friend last year after she flirted with Sky. Sky doesn't deny it, which scares Bloom. Meanwhile, Silva's condition worsens even after the Burned One is killed, implying that there are more. Bloom and her friends fight the Burned One together until Dowling arrives to finish it off. They return to find that Silva is healing. Beatrix gets into the secret passage in Dowling's room using Dowling's assistant to trigger the trap which leaves him injured. Beatrix kills him to cover her tracks after she is unable to access a hidden room. At the end of the episode, it is revealed that Rosalind is being held captive in the room that Beatrix tried to access.
4	4	"Some Wrecked Angel"	Hannah Quinn	Niceole R. Levy	22 January 2021
Queen Luna arrives at Alfea to give a speech. She is not happy with Stella's progress and decides to pull Stella from school against Dowling's wishes. Meanwhile, Dowling begins to investigate Callum's death. Bloom gets to know about this from Aisha and starts looking for hidden information in the school with the help of Beatrix. The two of them find a war room with a map that has Aster Dell marked on it. Beatrix takes Bloom to Aster Dell and says war crimes were committed there as she claims Dowling and her allies destroyed it in order to kill the Burned Ones that were there with no regard for collateral damage. She states this happened two days before Bloom's birthday which causes Bloom to suspect that her biological parents were murdered at Aster Dell. Beatrix then tells Bloom that Rosalind is an ally who is still alive and being held captive by Dowling. Before Bloom can get any more information, Dowling arrives and detains Beatrix. When questioned why they were there, Bloom lies to Dowling and tells her that it was a joyride.
5	5	"Wither Into the Truth"	Stephen Woolfenden	Teleplay by : Victoria Bata; Story by : Sarah Hooper	22 January 2021
Beatrix is imprisoned at Alfea. Dane and Bloom plot Beatrix's escape. Meanwhile, Sky has been tasked by Dowling and Silva to spy on Bloom. Bloom secretly visits Beatrix with help from Dane, and Beatrix offers her access to Rosalind if she is freed. Stella has snuck back into Alfea. Musa, Terra, and Stella plot a way to help Bloom without helping Beatrix to Aisha's chagrin. Sky catches Bloom conjuring magic at the stone circle in order to help break out Beatrix. Sky confronts her and tells her the truth about his spying. He wants them to trust each other. They kiss and Bloom drugs him to knock him unconscious. A battalion calls in to reveal many Burned Ones are on their way. Bloom confronts Dowling about Aster Dell. Dowling says Rosalind tricked them into destroying it and that is why she is being held captive. Terra and Musa help break out Beatrix and together they go down to the basement with Bloom and Stella to break out Rosalind. Stella uses Beatrix to trigger the trap, immobilizing her. They free Rosalind as the others prepare to battle the Burned Ones.
6	6	"A Fanatic Heart"	Stephen Woolfenden	Brian Young	22 January 2021
Rosalind tells Bloom that Aster Dell was filled with Blood Witches and that Bloom's biological parents are still alive. She also reveals the Burned Ones are targeting Bloom for her powers. The Burned Ones get dangerously close. Rosalind tries to activate Bloom's full power, but then Bloom realizes she is being used. She goes to help Alfea by drawing the Burned Ones away. She is met by Sky and the two share a kiss before she confronts the Burned Ones, unleashing her full power and destroying them all. Bloom and her roommates go back to Earth where she reveals everything to her adoptive parents. Meanwhile, Silva reveals to Sky that he had to kill Andreas for siding with Rosalind as Rosalind escapes alongside Beatrix, Dane, and Riven. The Solarians finally arrive with Queen Luna and Andreas to everyone's surprise. They arrest Silva for the attempted murder of Andreas. Rosalind and Dowling confront each other in the woods. Rosalind tells Dowling that the Dragon Flame, an ancient magical power, burns inside Bloom and that it was used against the Burned Ones who were soldiers in an old war. Rosalind then kills Dowling. Rosalind and Andreas take over Alfea.

=== Season 2 (2022) ===
No. overall	No. in season	Title	Directed by	Written by	Original release date
7	1	"Low-Flying Panic Attack"	Ed Bazalgette	Brian Young	16 September 2022
8	2	"Taken by the Wind"	Ed Bazalgette	Victoria Bata	16 September 2022
9	3	"Your Newfound Popularity"	Sallie Aprahamian	Amanda Rosenberg	16 September 2022
The school prepares for the alumni banquet, where Stella is determined to expose Rosalind's true nature. The group plan to break into the east wing to discover what is going on. Rosalind invites Bloom to the VIP dinner planning to show her off. Stella's uncle gets drunk. Stella confronts the gathering, but Rosalind reveals that fairies are being attacked by darker creatures and stealing their strong magic. Sam struggles to cope, planning to attack Rosalind directly. Aisha takes a risk with a boy. Sam and his father ultimately leave Alfea, unable to deal with Rosalind and her ambiguous sinister designs any longer.
10	4	"An Hour Before the Devil Fell"	Ed Bazalgette	Talia Gonzalez	16 September 2022
A pub night in town is interrupted by alarming news about Beatrix, who was kidnapped by a Blood Witch. Eventually, Sky, Riven and Musa attempt to rescue Beatrix. Musa is attacked and loses her power before she is rescued by Riven. Help arrives from Silva, but Andreas is possessed by a Blood Witch and Sky must kill him to save Silva's life. Bloom discovers the Blood Witch is none other than Sebastian and confronts him.
11	5	"Are You a Good Witch or a Bad Witch?"	Sallie Aprahamian	Vanessa James Benton	16 September 2022
Terra comes out as gay to her friends. The group attempt to use a crystal to restore Musa's mental-based fairy magic in full. It fails as she is happy to be free of listening to people's minds. Bloom strikes a risky bargain with Sebastian in exchange for startling information. Sebastian tells Bloom that Rosalind killed Farah Dowling. Bloom returns to Alfea and is confronted by Rosalind. Rosalind attacks her, but a furious Bloom succeeds in ending the fairy's future sinister plans by tapping into the fiery, cosmic-like powers of the inextinguishable Dragon Flame of the legendary Great Dragon himself.
12	6	"Poor Unfortunate Souls"	David Moore	Shaina Fewell	16 September 2022
Bloom is put on trial for killing Rosalind. Queen Luna blames Rosalind's death on Sebastian and the Blood Witches and declares war on them as a result. In order to establish a claim of self-defense, Flora and Terra attempt to find Farah Dowling's body without success; Luna sentences Bloom to stasis for 20 years as punishment and praises Stella for warning her about the potential danger that Bloom posed. Disgusted with her mother, Stella makes it clear that she will choose her friends over her family if pushed to that point. As the Specialists unsuccessfully raid Sebastian's hideout, Aisha discovers that Grey is actually a Blood Witch, something that he does not deny; with war declared against the Blood Witches, Grey agrees to help Sebastian. A plant recovered from the graveyard proves to contain Dowling's spiritual essence who releases Bloom and gives her students a lesson on how to unlock their true powers and achieve a further advanced and highly evolved transformation. After giving some final advice to Bloom, Dowling's spirit fades away for good. With the help of Beatrix, Sebastian and the Blood Witches successfully invade Alfea.
13	7	"All the Wild Witches"	David Moore	Gregory Locklear	16 September 2022
Sebastian and the Blood Witches take over the school, capturing a number of fairies and draining them of their magic and putting many of the Specialists under their control. However, Beatrix helps Musa to escape. In exchange for Beatrix's help, Sebastian gives her information on her family, revealing that she had two sisters at Aster Dell. Beatrix discovers that Sebastian needs the Dragon Flame to open a conduit to the Realm of Darkness where he will ask an entity known as the Shadow to resurrect everyone killed at Aster Dell; as this could also destroy the Otherworld, Beatrix warns Stella. As Saul and his men attempt to retake the school, Sebastian uses Sky as a hostage to force Bloom to give him the Dragon Flame, but not before he reveals that Bloom was born a thousand years ago during the ancient war. Bloom's biological mother had the almighty Dragon Flame as well but lost control of it, killing thousands of people. Out of sheer guilt and remorse, she had put Bloom into stasis and banished herself to the Realm of Darkness. Flora injects herself with poison and draws the Scrappers to her in order to get rid of them; while she survives, she is left with an unhealed bite wound. Grey reveals that his brother was killed in the city of Aster Dell and he wants him back to get out from under his parents' expectations. Beatrix kills Sky to stop the transfer of great magical power. Grey is able to revive Sky, but Sebastian kills Beatrix in retaliation. Aisha, Stella and Terra achieve their higher fairy transformations and combine their even stronger fairy powers of water, light and earth respectively, with Bloom to kill Sebastian. Sebastian's death restores Musa and the other fairies' own lost magical powers; the remaining Blood Witches flee. However, Bloom discovers that Sebastian had already opened the conduit and she travels through to seal it from the other side. In the Realm of Darkness, Bloom finally finds her birth mother. The Shadow suddenly reappears at the graveyard, where Stella looks at Beatrix's note about her sisters.

== Production ==
=== Season 1 ===
==== Development ====
Comparison of Musa, Stella, Bloom, and Aisha in Fate (top) and in press artwork for the animated show (bottom)

The idea for a live-action adaptation of Winx Club dates back to 2011. Winx Club creator Iginio Straffi first proposed a live version in May 2011, several months after Viacom became a co-owner of his studio Rainbow and started financing his projects. At the Ischia Global Fest in 2013, Straffi stated that he was still planning a production "with the Winx in flesh and blood, played by real actors. Sooner or later it will be done." Straffi had only worked on animated productions at the time, so he transitioned his focus to live action, working as a producer for Nickelodeon's live-action show Club 57.

In February 2016, Iginio Straffi mentioned that a live-action movie concept was being considered in partnership with Hollywood Gang Productions, but the project never proceeded. In March 2018, the idea was revisited as a television series after Netflix ordered a young-adult version for its streaming service. Straffi was involved in the early planning stages, and he declined a suggestion from Netflix for the male characters to be given larger roles.

After a pilot episode was scripted, Nickelodeon's American crew members from the cartoon, including Bloom's voice actress, Molly Quinn, travelled to meet the Fate production team and review the script. Francesco Artibani, one of the Italian writers of the animated version, was brought in to read the storyline. Rainbow's Joanne Lee oversaw the first season as an executive producer.

The writers behind Fate are entirely new to the Winx franchise, and they were recruited from teen dramas like The Vampire Diaries. Brian Young, who worked on seven seasons of The Vampire Diaries, is the creator and showrunner of Fate: The Winx Saga. According to an interview with The Guardian, Young chose to "ditch the look" of the cartoon Winx fairies, who have big eyes and sparkling outfits. He said, "Look, again, I'm a massive manga anime fan... but nobody looks like that." Some episodes of the first season were directed by Lisa James Larsson and Hannah Quinn.

==== Casting ====
Casting calls were held in August 2019. Abigail Cowen was announced to be headlining the series as Bloom in September 2019. "Bloom is a fire fairy who grew up in the first world, so she did not grow up in the other world. And she finds out, kind of by accident, that she has these powers," said Cowen.

Hannah van der Westhuysen, who plays Stella, revealed "Stella is a very complex girl. She appears a certain way, but she's actually a lot softer and she has a lot of barriers that need to be broken down." Precious Mustapha, who plays Aisha, said, "Aisha is a water fairy. From the offset, she seems quite confident with her powers. But, 'cause she's a perfectionist, she doesn't think that's good enough. She wants to always be developing."

Eliot Salt, who plays Terra, added, "Terra's power is all plant based. It's growing things and sending them off after people. She is the most welcoming. She loves it. She loves to meet new people. She gives too much."

Elisha Applebaum, who portrays Musa, said, "Musa is an empath. Her power is to feel everyone's emotions, whether it's nature or anything around. She's just open and honest, but also she's not honest with herself and she's trying to learn how to do that."

Danny Griffin, Sadie Soverall, Freddie Thorp, Eve Best, and Robert James-Collier were cast to play Sky, Beatrix, Riven, Farah Dowling, and Saul Silva in the series.

==== Filming ====
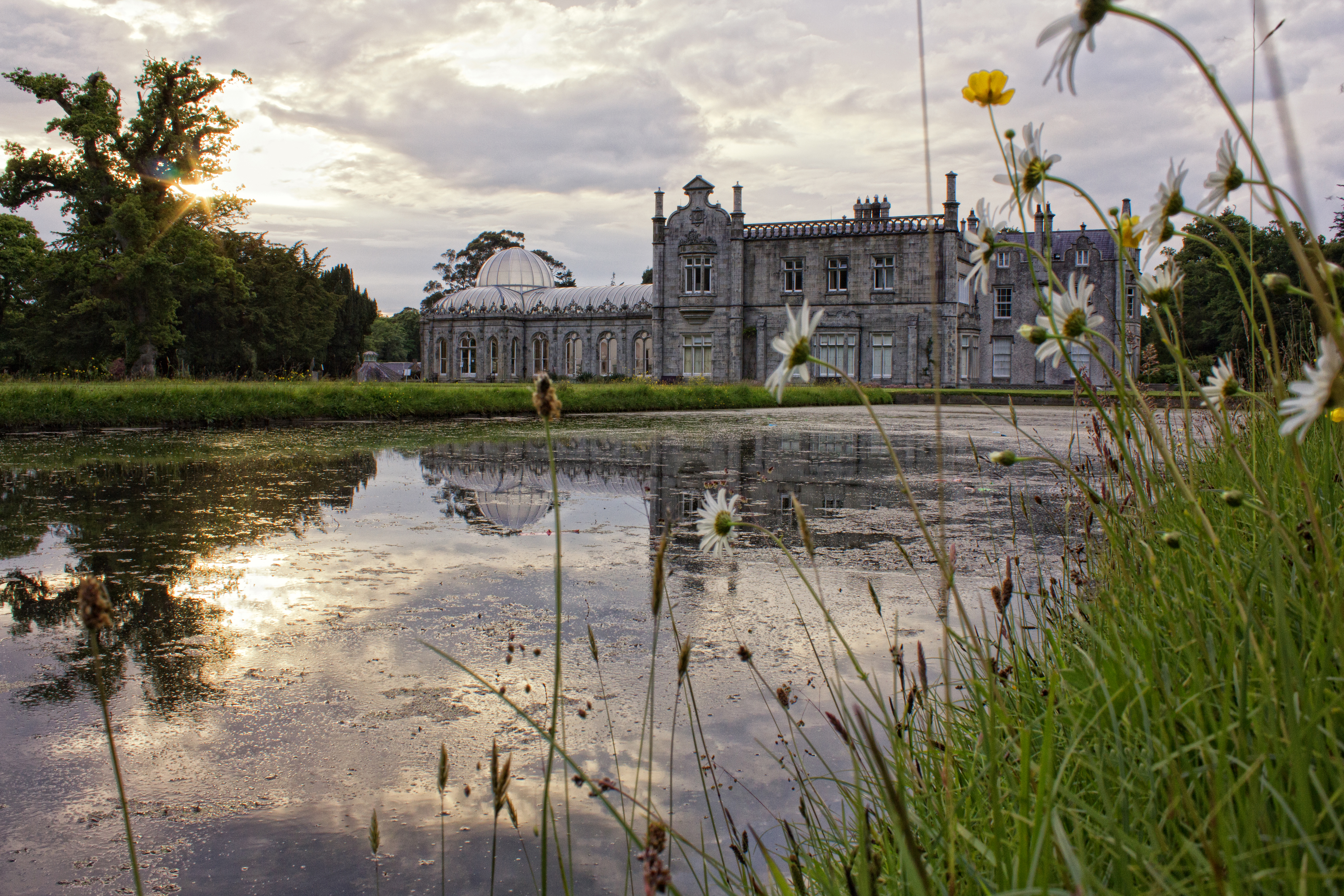
Killruddery House is portrayed as Alfea in Fate: The Winx Saga

Filming of the first season began in County Wicklow, Ireland, in September 2019 and concluded in December 2019. The primary filming locations included Killruddery House and Ardmore Studios in Bray. Some indoor scenes of the series were shot at Ashford Studios. Griffin, who plays Sky, said, "We had an incredible stunt crew who would take us through the steps very slowly and were really patient in the beginning. But it's always a big struggle, because later it had to be fast and accurate." Cowen, who plays Bloom, said, "Playing Bloom was interesting. I think I put a lot of pressure on myself because I knew that so many people are fans of the original Winx. It was a nerve-wracking but exciting and exhilarating experience."

Westhuysen, who portrays Stella, revealed, "I made diaries, scrapbooks, and things like that. They are really nice to look back on and will be very helpful for filming season two." Salt, who plays Terra, said, "I think what jumped out for me was just the range that everybody gets to do in the show, which is, I guess, quite unusual for most parts, but I think especially when you're generally playing young women, and the fact that we get to do comedy and tragedy and action and there's a lot to get your teeth into, so that's what really stood out to me." Mustapha, who plays Aisha, added, "I think the power of female friendship was something that really struck a chord with me, and I was like, 'This will be really fun to do' because we don't often get shows that are centred around women, let alone five women, so that was something I was definitely really excited about being a part of."

==== Music ====
Fate: The Winx Saga's music score was composed by Anne Nikitin, and the official playlist is available on Spotify, including 33 songs from various artists. Netflix also released a playlist for each fairy – Bloom's Fire Playlist, Stella's Light Playlist, Musa's Mind Playlist, Aisha's Water Playlist, Terra's Earth Playlist, and Beatrix's Air Playlist – on Spotify.

=== Season 2 ===
==== Development ====
On 18 February 2021, Netflix renewed the series for a second season to consist of eight episodes. "The six episodes in season one only scratched the surface of this incredibly rich world and the powerful fairies who inhabit it. As Bloom's story continues to evolve, I can't wait for you to learn even more about Aisha, Stella, Terra, and Musa! And you never know who might show up at Alfea next term…" said showrunner Brian Young. The second season, which ultimately consisted of seven episodes, released on 16 September 2022.

Young revealed the audience can expect Icy and Darcy, two of the Trix trio, if the show gets renewed for a season three.

Young added, "The benefit of a season 2 show is it gives you the ability to sort of expand the things that made season 1 great. We had more second-unit days, we had more VFX, more everything to be completely honest. We were able to really make the VFX sing to make the show feel like it's the best version of itself that it can be." Visual Effects supervisor David Houghton said, "In COVID times, it is difficult to rally as many extras as you would normally be able to. With some VFX help and some clever filming, we're able to fill out our world."

On Terra's coming out moment, Salt said, "I was told it was going to happen quite early on in Season 1. So I knew that whole time, and I kept it quiet-ish. It's so important, now more than ever, to see queer joy depicted on screen. In a setting where there's so much else going on, it was nice to put all of that aside for a moment to say that this is great." Young added, "Having Terra not be a canon character from the series gave us a little more leeway with her on the show. Audiences need to see people struggling, then coming out, then having a group of friends loving and supporting them. There's wish fulfillment in that."

==== Casting ====
On 20 July 2021, Paulina Chávez, Brandon Grace and Éanna Hardwicke were announced to be joining the series's second season as Flora, Grey and Sebastian. Chávez said about Flora, "She's very much a person that cares about people a lot, and that's what makes her so easily lovable. She really controls the room when she's in it, and that's something that I had to learn to do. I'm a little shy." She further recalled, "I remember when they actually announced it and there was a comment just like, 'Guys, she's Mexican. We won.'" Chávez said, "This is a big win for the Latino community. I'm in Ireland, what the hell?! Who would've thought this girl from El Paso would be here? It's pretty cool." Despite the whitewashing controversy, Applebaum returned as Musa.

On 27 July 2022, Miranda Richardson and Daniel Betts were announced to be replacing Lesley Sharp and Alex Macqueen as Rosalind Hale and Professor Ben Harvey, respectively. Sharp was not able to return to the series as she had other commitments scheduled and could not make the filming dates work.

==== Filming ====
The second season began filming in Ireland in July 2021, with filming concluding in November 2021. The Dublin Hellfire Club was one of the filming locations for the season. The scene featuring Cowen and Best in episode six was filmed with a body double. Farah's lines were played through a massive speaker as Best was not present on set at the moment. Weeks later, she filmed her own parts in London in front of a green screen because of COVID-related hurdles. Houghton added, "Their wings aren't just wings. Their kind of wings are made of various elemental forces, like water or light. They have to fly and then, at the end of it, they use their magical powers to blast the villain, who also has a magical effect all over his body. There were all those different elements in a scene that we had to shoot in 2 or 3 days on a set and then have green screen elements on top of that." He revealed, "Every visual effect shot costs around £310,000, depending on the complexity of it."

Cowen, who plays Bloom, said, "Everything is just kind of amped up. Through our costumes, our hair, our makeup, our characters feel more sure about themselves and are really coming into their own. New secrets are revealed, and it's going to be really, really awesome. I've seen little clips, and it's very cinematic. We're really excited." Mustapha, who plays Aisha, added, "I feel like this season, in particular, everyone has their own story. We're not always together, and I think that's gonna be really exciting to watch because I've not seen some of the things others have done."

Westhuysen, who portrays Stella, revealed, "We'll sometimes have two different crews at the same time, so in one day you could film a scene from episodes 1, 2, 3, 4, and 5 just doting between two different crews. And that's a testament to how brilliant the crew is on this." Applebaum, who portrays Musa, said, "Some of the stunt-y scenes I've had to do have been a bit more challenging because they're not things I've done before. It's definitely straining on the body. I've gone home and had an Epsom salt bath every single time I've done one, and then it's off to the next."

Talking about the fairy transformations in the final episode, Salt, who plays Terra, said, "It was so much fun. Going up in the little strings and having a man in a green suit spin me around with his hands was one of the most surreal things that has ever happened to me, and I enjoyed every second." Thorp, who plays Riven, said, "I spend a lot of time with our stunt team, who are fantastic and all very experienced, in martial arts, stunt driving, and sword fighting." About the fight scene in the ruins, he said, "It was amazing and epic to shoot because we did it in these old ruins, on top of this hill. It used to be where the Hellfire group used to meet, which is an old cult that had meetings in Ireland."

==== Music ====
"Dark Side" by Neoni was used in the trailer of the second season. Taylor Swift's "Wildest Dreams" was featured in a scene where Bloom and Sky are horse riding in a field.

=== Cancellation ===
On November 1, 2022, Brian Young announced that Netflix decided not to order another season, leaving the series on an unresolved cliffhanger.

== Reception ==
=== Critical response ===
Review aggregator Rotten Tomatoes reported an approval rating of 40% based on 20 reviews, with an average rating of 5.2/10. The website's critical consensus reads, "Flat, flimsy, and forgettable, Fate: The Winx Saga is a fantastical flop that fails to capture the magic of its source material."

Caroline Framke of Variety criticized the series for relying too much on clichés and wrote that "while adapted from an animated show about friends that was largely targeted at pre-teens, it takes a page out of the Riverdale book by giving everything an ominous sheen of sexy intrigue". Joel Keller from Decider urged the audience to skip the series, stating that "while there's nothing inherently terrible about Fate: The Winx Saga, there's nothing about it that stands out. Also, do we need yet another dark and gritty remake of a beloved kids' series?" Deirdre Molumby from Entertainment.ie praised the cast but criticized the plot and the poor CGI quality.

Petrana Radulovic of Polygon wrote that "Fate: The Winx Saga does create a compelling, nuanced plot. The worldbuilding is exciting, offering a spin on the animated series' world of fairies and non-magical, sword-wielding Specialists." Melissa Camacho of Common Sense Media criticized the diversity of the cast along with the teen angst shown in the series, but wrote that "Fate: The Winx Saga offers a story world that is easy to escape into, and easy to get caught up in, if you're looking for a fantastical universe to explore."

=== Viewership ===
The show peaked at #2 on Nielsen's Streaming Charts on the week of 25 January with 918 million minutes in viewership, trailing only Bridgerton at 936 million. On 20 April 2021, Netflix reported that 57 million of its subscribers watched the first season of the series during the first 28 days of its release.

=== Controversy ===
The series received backlash over the casting of Applebaum as Musa, who was coded as East Asian and whose character design was based on Lucy Liu, as well as the apparent replacement of Flora, who was coded as Latina and whose character design was based on Jennifer Lopez, with a new white character named Terra.

In response to the backlash, Abigail Cowen said she was not involved in the casting but hoped that Flora would be introduced in the second season, saying "I do think diversity both in front of and behind the camera is vital and much-needed throughout the industry and internationally. So I think it's important that we are having these conversations." Brian Young has said Terra is the cousin of Flora, leaving Flora's inclusion in the show a possibility. Elisha Applebaum, who plays Musa, also addressed the controversy. "It's really sad to see that fans were upset with the casting. I wasn't involved in the casting but I hope that what they've seen and how I've portrayed Musa was to their liking," Elisha told Digital Spy.

Responding to the backlash to the casting whitewashing, Iginio Straffi said that Rainbow S.p.A. demanded that the ethnic diversity of Winx Club be respected in the live-action adaptation, but that Netflix chose to make different casting choices.

== Tie-in media ==
=== Novels ===
On 2 February 2021, a novelization of the first season, titled The Fairies' Path, was released. It features bonus scenes and character backstories not seen on the show. It was written by Irish author Sarah Rees Brennan under the pen name Ava Corrigan.

On 16 August 2022, another novel, titled Lighting the Fire, was released. It features an original story not seen in the show, set before the events of the first season. It was again written by Sarah Rees Brennan, this time under her real name.

=== Graphic novels ===
In February 2023, it was announced that Rainbow had partnered with American independent comic book publisher Mad Cave Studios to publish graphic novels based on the Winx brand. It was later specified that Mad Cave's young adult imprint Maverick would publish a series of graphic novels resuming the story of Fate: The Winx Saga after its unresolved cliffhanger. The first volume in the series, titled Dark Destiny, written by Olivia Cuartero-Briggs and illustrated by Christianne Gillenardo-Goudreau, was released as an ebook on 30 July 2024 and in paperback on 13 August. The second volume titled The Shadow War was released on 22 July 2025. Cuartero-Briggs returned to write the story while Valeria Peri took over as the illustrator. The story is set to conclude with the third volume, Battle for the OtherWorld, to be released on 8 September 2026, with both Cuartero-Briggs and Peri returning.
