= Florian Munteanu =

Romanian born in Germany actor and boxer (born 1990)

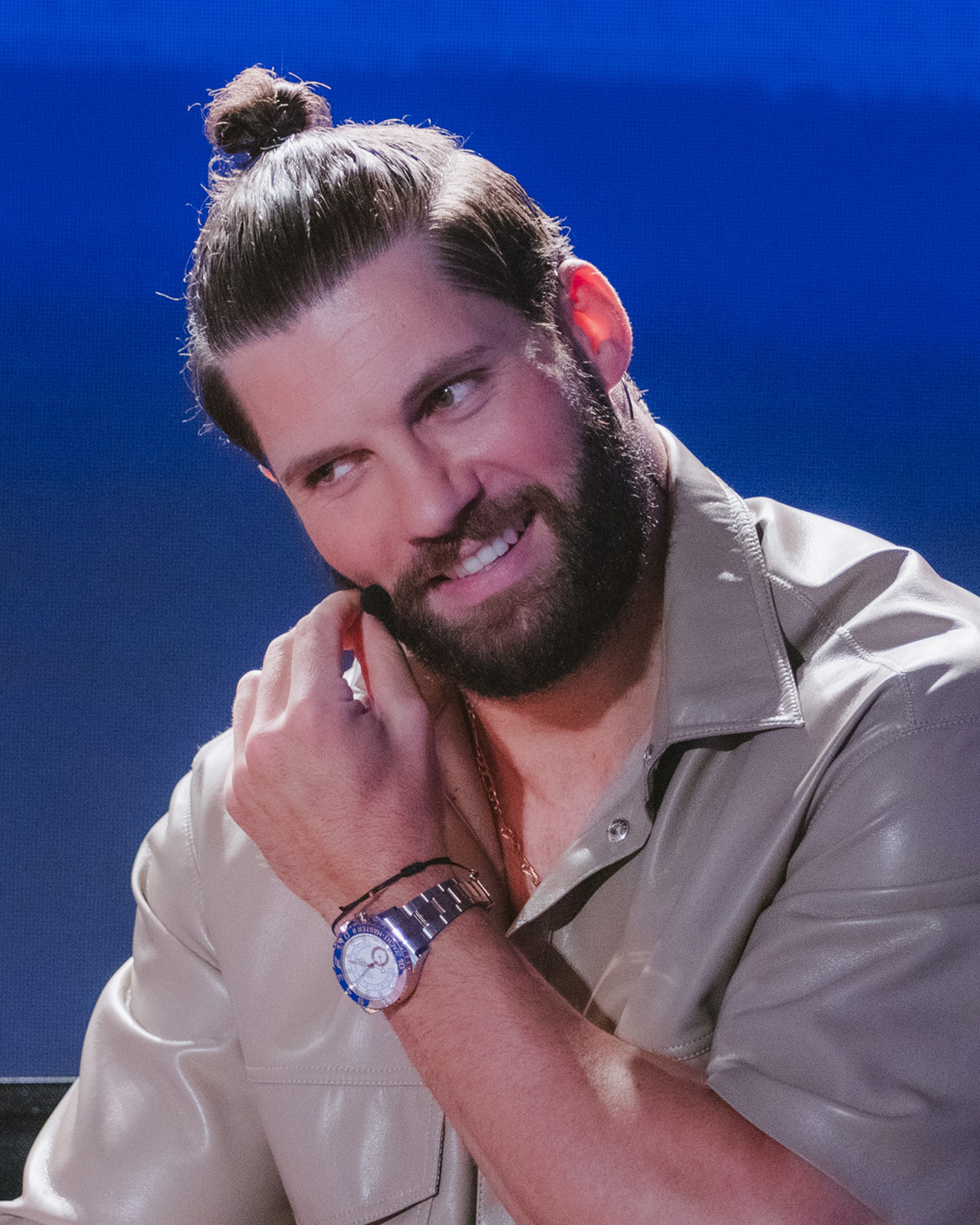
- Munteanu in 2024
- Born: 13 October 1990 (age 35); Würzburg, Germany
- Other name: Big Nasty
- Education: Hochschule Mittweida (BA)
- Occupations: Actor; boxer
- Years active: 2016–present
- Height: 6 ft 4 in (1.93 m)
- Website: florianmunteanu.com

Florian Munteanu (Romanian: [floˈri.an munˈte.a.nu]; born 13 October 1990) is a German and Romanian actor. He is known for playing the boxer Viktor Drago in Creed II (2018) and Creed III (2023), and Razor Fist in Shang-Chi and the Legend of the Ten Rings (2021).

== Early life and education ==
Munteanu was born in Germany to Romanian parents in 1990. His mother is a lawyer, while his father was a dermatologist and former boxer. Munteanu grew up in Bogen, and later moved to Munich to study at the university of applied science Hochschule Mittweida. In 2014 he defended his Bachelor of Arts thesis on the "Structure and organization of the sport of boxing in Germany: associations, boxing promotion companies, federations, management and marketing in general, with a comparison to the structures implemented in the USA".

== Career ==
Munteanu had his first film role in Bogat, a 2016 German-Romanian film shot in Munich. His breakthrough in acting came in 2018, when Sylvester Stallone was looking for a European heavyweight boxer to play Viktor Drago, the son of Ivan Drago, in the sports drama sequel Creed II. Stallone found Munteanu through training videos on the Internet and personally promoted him for the role. At that time, Munteanu was 6 ft 4 in (193 cm) tall and weighed c. 255 lb (116 kg), but had to shed c. 20 lb (9.1 kg) for the role.

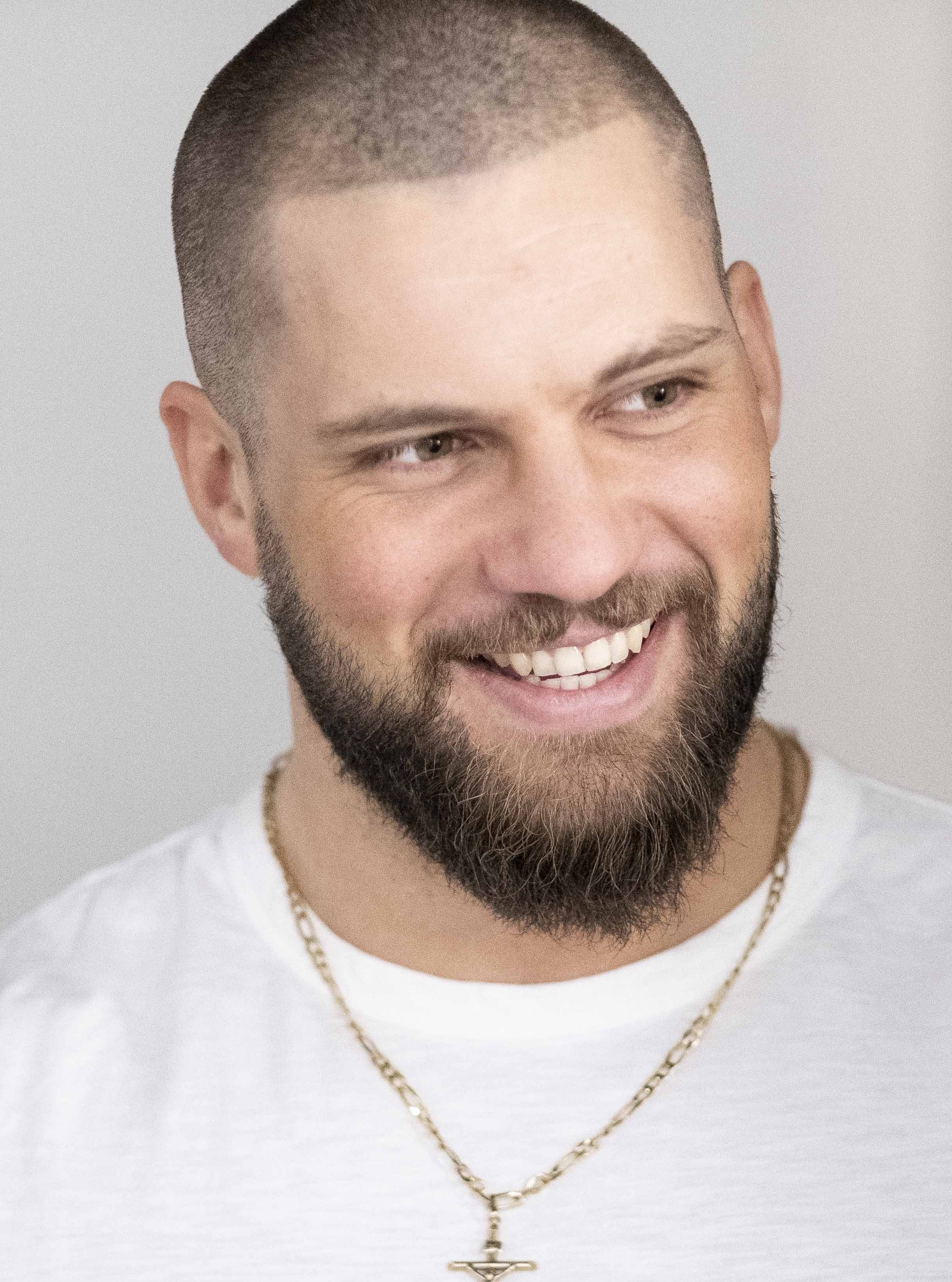
Munteanu in 2020

Munteanu has joined the Season 3 line-up for Netflix's historical drama series Vikings: Valhalla. He has been cast as General George Maniakes.

Munteanu lives in Munich and Los Angeles, California. He was featured on the covers of Muscle & Fitness (October 2018) and Men's Health (December 2018).

== Personal life ==
Munteanu is fluent in Romanian, German, and English. On January 19, 2025, Munteanu announced on Instagram that his father had died. He is currently living in Bucharest, Munich and Los Angeles.

== Filmography ==
=== Film ===
Year	Title	Role	Director	Note
2016	Bogat	Razvan	Valentin Kruse	Short film
2018	Creed II	Viktor Drago	Steven Caple Jr.	
2021	Shang-Chi and the Legend of the Ten Rings	Razor Fist	Destin Daniel Cretton	
2022	The Contractor	Kauffman	Tarik Saleh	
2023	Creed III	Viktor Drago	Michael B. Jordan	
2024	Borderlands	Krieg	Eli Roth	
TBA	Painter †	TBA	Garrett Warren	

=== Television ===
Year	Title	Role	Note
2021	The Roles That Changed My Life	Himself	1 episode
2024	Vikings: Valhalla	George Maniakes	Recurring role; Season 3

== Awards and nominations ==
Award	Year	Category	Work	Result	Ref(s)
MTV Movie Awards	2022	Best Fight	Shang-Chi and the Legend of the Ten Rings	Nominated	
Golden Raspberry Awards	2025	Worst Screen Combo	Borderlands	Nominated	
