= Precious Mustapha =

British actress (born 1997)

- Born: 13 April 1997 (age 29); Hackney, London, United Kingdom
- Education: East 15 Acting School
- Years active: 2019–present

Precious O. Mustapha (born 13 April 1997) is a British actress. She is known for her role in the Netflix series Fate: The Winx Saga (2021–2022).

== Early life ==
Mustapha was born in Hackney, East London and raised by her mother with two sisters. Of Nigerian descent, she speaks English and Yoruba. Mustapha attended Mossbourne Community Academy. At the recommendation of her drama teacher, she went on to train at the East 15 Acting School, completing a Bachelor of Arts awarded by the University of Essex in 2018.

== Career ==
Mustapha made her television debut with a guest appearance in a 2019 episode of the ITV detective drama Endeavour. She then landed her first main television role in the Netflix teen fantasy series Fate: The Winx Saga, a live-action adaptation of the animated series Winx Club, as Aisha. The series premiered in 2021 and ran for two seasons. Also in 2021, Mustapha played Roxy Millikan in the second series of the Sky Comedy police procedural Code 404 and modeled for H&M on a campaign with Lily Newmark.

In 2023, Mustapha had a recurring role as Simi in the final season of the Apple TV+ sports comedy Ted Lasso and made a guest appearance in an episode of the Amazon Prime series The Power.

== Filmography ==
Year	Title	Role	Notes
2019	Endeavour	Lucy Paroo	Episode: "Degüello"
2020	The Stranger	Student	1 episode
2021	Code 404	Roxy Millikan	3 episodes (series 2)
2021	Daddy's Girl	Sade	Short film
2021	Colby	Colby	Short film
2021–2022	Fate: The Winx Saga	Aisha	Main role
2023	The Power	Marissa	Episode: "A Better Future is in Your Hands"
2023	Ted Lasso	Simi	3 episodes
2023	The New Girl	Grace	Short film
2024	Cheaters	Claire	2 episodes (series 2)
