= Eric Porter =

British actor (1928–1995)

- Born: Eric Richard Porter; 8 April 1928; Shepherd's Bush, London, England
- Died: 15 May 1995 (aged 67); London, England
- Occupation: Actor
- Years active: 1945–1994

Eric Richard Porter (8 April 1928 – 15 May 1995) was an English actor of stage, film and television.

== Early life ==
Porter was born in Shepherd's Bush, London, to bus conductor Richard John Porter and Phoebe Elizabeth (née Spall). His parents hoped he would become an electrical engineer, so he was educated at the Technical College in Wimbledon, then worked for the Marconi Telegraph and Wireless company as a joint-solderer. He made his stage debut at the Cambridge Arts Theatre in 1945 at the age of 17.

== Career ==
In 1955, Porter played the title role in Ben Jonson's Volpone at the Bristol Old Vic. He won the London Evening Standard award in 1959 for his performance in Ibsen's Rosmersholm at the Royal Court Theatre. In 1960 he joined the Royal Shakespeare Company; that year, he played Ferdinand in John Webster's The Duchess of Malfi. In 1962, he performed as Iachimo in Cymbeline. Other roles included Ulysses, Macbeth, Leontes, Malvolio, Shylock, King Lear and Henry IV, as well as Barabas in Marlowe's Jew of Malta. Porter was seen as the tortured solicitor Soames Forsyte in the BBC drama The Forsyte Saga (1967). The series was a huge international success, and his role, for which he won a BAFTA Best Actor award, also made him a star. Porter was one of the guests on the Morecambe and Wise 1970 Christmas Special, performing "If They Could See Me Now" from Sweet Charity with the duo, revealing his song and dance skills with panache.

Porter's 1981 portrayal of Neville Chamberlain in Winston Churchill: The Wilderness Years won critical praise. He played Count Bronowsky in The Jewel in the Crown; he was also seen as Fagin in the 1985 BBC version of Oliver Twist; as Thomas Danforth in the 1980 BBC production of The Crucible; and as Professor Moriarty opposite Jeremy Brett's Sherlock Holmes in Granada Television's The Adventures of Sherlock Holmes stories The Red-Headed League and The Final Problem (both 1984). He also played Polonius in a 1980 television production of Hamlet, made as part of the BBC Shakespeare series, and starring Derek Jacobi in the title role.

Porter continued to act on stage, again winning the Evening Standard Theatre Award for Best Actor in 1988 for his role in Cat on a Hot Tin Roof. His last on-screen role was as painter James Player in the remake of Message for Posterity (1994), a television play by Dennis Potter.

== Personal life ==
As quoted in the 2016 biography Peter O'Toole: The Definitive Biography by Robert Sellers, Susan Engel told the biographer that Eric Porter was gay: "His memorable BAFTA Best Actor Award-winning performance as Soames in the BBC's 1967 television adaptation of The Forsyte Saga should have led to greater things, but it didn't. 'He couldn't cope with his own sexuality,' says Susan. 'It was so awful for gay men in those days. I don't know how some of them managed to survive; and many didn't. You went to prison if you were caught. I think he suffered terribly. He was tortured.'"

In The Telegraph, Ben Lawrence, in an article on The Forsyte Saga, observed that "the series made a star of Porter who, according to some sources, was secretly gay and deeply uncomfortable about the attention which The Forsyte Saga foisted on him." In 1956 and All that: The Making of Modern British Drama (1999), the dramatist and academic Dan Rebellato includes Porter in a list of "gay men ... powerful in the British theatre of the forties and fifties".

The 2017 biography Eric Porter: The Life of an Acting Giant, by Porter's "friend and chosen biographer" Helen Monk, indicates that he was "previously understood ... to be secretly gay", and details his relationships with "a string of female lovers", including "the foremost woman in his life for 40 years until his death ... glamorous Dutch widow, Therese Megaw", Australian artist Alexandra Alderson, and his live-in secretary, Kay, a "Judi Dench-lookalike", with Monk concluding Porter "probably was bisexual".

== Filmography ==
- The Fall of the Roman Empire (1964) - Julianus
- The Pumpkin Eater (1964) - Psychiatrist
- The Heroes of Telemark (1965) - Josef Terboven
- Kaleidoscope (1966) - Harry Dominion
- The Forsyte Saga (1967) - Soames Forsyte
- The Lost Continent (1968) - Capt. Lansen
- Hands of the Ripper (1971) - Dr. John Pritchard
- Nicholas and Alexandra (1971) - Pyotr Stolypin
- Antony and Cleopatra (1972) - Enobarbus
- The Belstone Fox (1972) - Asher Smith
- Hitler: The Last Ten Days (1973) - General von Greim
- The Day of the Jackal (1973) - Colonel Rodin
- Callan (1974) - Hunter
- Hennessy (1975) - Sean Tobin
- Anna Karenina (1977) - Karenin
- The Thirty Nine Steps (1978) - Lomas
- Little Lord Fauntleroy (1980) - Havisham
- The Crucible (TV, 1980) - Governor Danforth
- Why Didn't They Ask Evans? (TV 1980) - Dr. Nicholson
- Winston Churchill: The Wilderness Years (TV, 1981) - Neville Chamberlain
- The Jewel in the Crown (TV, 1984) - Dimitri Bronowsky
- The Adventures of Sherlock Holmes: Episodes "The Red-Headed League" and "The Final Problem" (TV, 1984) - Professor Moriarty
- Oliver Twist (BBC TV series, 1985) - Fagin

== Death ==
Porter died of colon cancer in London in 1995, aged 67.
