= Eliot Salt =

British actress

- Born: Eliot Mary Salt; 18 January 1994 (age 32); Stockport, Greater Manchester, England
- Education: University of Bristol; London Academy of Music and Dramatic Art
- Occupation: Actress
- Years active: 2013–present

Eliot Mary Salt (born 1994) is an English actress, theatre maker, and writer.

== Early life and education ==
Salt is from Stockport, Greater Manchester. Salt attended Manchester High School for Girls. She studied English at the University of Bristol and later trained in Acting at the London Academy of Music and Dramatic Art (LAMDA).

== Career ==
Salt made her television debut in 2019 in 4 episodes of the Channel 4 sitcom GameFace. In 2020, Salt began playing Evelyn in the Sky One spy comedy series Intelligence. She also appeared as Joanna, Marianne's friend at Trinity College Dublin, in the BBC Three and Hulu miniseries Normal People. She starred as Terra in the 2021 Netflix series Fate: The Winx Saga.

She was cast in Manor at the National Theatre.

=== Deadpan Theatre and Mack and Salt ===
Salt founded Deadpan Theatre with Artemis Fitzalan Howard in 2013. The pair co-wrote Low Tide in Glass Bay, Changing Partners, and Get Your Shit Together.

It was here Salt formed a comedy duo with Jude Mack, whom she met at university, later known as Mack and Salt. Mack and Salt's productions through Deadpan include Predrinks / After Party and Third Wheel. It was announced in January 2021 that BBC Three had picked up Mack and Salt's pilot Amicable, a screen adaptation of the former, which they would write and star in.

== Filmography ==
Year	Title	Role	Notes
2019	GameFace	Frances	4 episodes
2020–2021	Intelligence	Evelyn	Main role
2020	Normal People	Joanna	6 episodes
2021–2022	Fate: The Winx Saga	Terra Harvey	Main role
2021	Dalgliesh	Madeleine Goodale	2 episodes
2023	Slow Horses	Sarah	6 episodes
2024	Industry	Caedi McFarlane	4 episodes
2026	Rivals	Caroline "Muffy" Hampshire	3 episodes
2026	Star City	Vika Yegorova	6 episodes

== Stage ==
Year	Title	Role	Notes
2014	Low Tide in Glass Bay	Bronnie	Writer; Alma Tavern Theatre, Bristol; Landor Theatre, London; Underbelly, Edinburgh Fringe Festival; White Theatre, Bristol
2014	Changing Partners	—N/a	Writer; Alma Tavern Theatre, Bristol; Rialto Theatre, Brighton Fringe
2015	Get Your Shit Together	Marguerite	Writer; Underbelly, Edinburgh Fringe Festival; Landor Theatre, London
2015	In Other Words	Various	Barbican Theatre, Plymouth
2016	PreDrinks / AfterParty	Ally	Writer; Underbelly, Edinburgh Fringe Festival
2016	Pulling Out	Caitlin	UK tour
2017	Third Wheel	Polly	Writer; Guilded Balloon, Edinburgh
2023–2024	The House of Bernarda Alba	Amelia	National Theatre, London
2024	Roots	Jenny Beales	Almeida Theatre, London

== Audio ==
Year	Title	Role	Notes	Ref
2013	The Confessions of Caminada	Woman	BBC Radio 4	
2026	The Murder at the Vicarage	Anne Protheroe	Audible Original	
