= The Forsyte Saga (2002 TV series) =

UK television series from 2002 to 2003

- Cover of The Forsyte Saga Collection DVDs
- Genre: Drama
- Written by: John Galsworthy; Stephen Mallatratt
- Directed by: Christopher Menaul; David Moore; Arnav Chakravarti
- Starring: Damian Lewis; Rupert Graves; Gina McKee; Corin Redgrave; Ioan Gruffudd
- Composer: Geoffrey Burgon
- Country of origin: United Kingdom
- Original language: English
- No. of series: 2
- No. of episodes: 10

Production
- Production locations: Croxteth Hall, Croxteth, Liverpool, Merseyside, England, UK
- Running time: 741 min
- Production company: Granada Television

Original release
- Network: ITV
- Release: 7 April 2002 – 15 June 2003

The Forsyte Saga is a British drama television serial that chronicles the lives of three generations of the upper-middle-class Forsyte family from the 1870s to the 1920s. It is based on the novels of John Galsworthy's The Forsyte Saga, for which he won the Nobel Prize in literature in 1932.

The books were adapted by Granada Television for ITV in two series:

- The Forsyte Saga in 2002, covering the novel The Man of Property (1906), the interlude "Indian Summer of a Forsyte" (1918), and the novel In Chancery (1920);
- The Forsyte Saga: To Let in 2003, covering the novel To Let (1921).

Additional funding was provided by the American PBS station WGBH, the 1967 BBC version of the same novels having been a success on PBS in the early 1970s.

== Development and production ==
The author Malcolm Bradbury wrote that the prospect of the new series "brings a tear to the eye and a smile to the lips" – a tear because time had passed the culturally significant original by, but a smile because investment in a classic project is good.

The makers of the 2002 version felt that any new production would be compared with the 1967 version, which had set the standards for period drama for 25 years. The idea came initially from David Liddiment, ITV's director of channels, who seized on the Forsyte novels not only as a great achievement in English literature, but also for their iconic status in British television. Granada were thinking big from the outset of the project – this was clearly something that could not be dashed off as a two-parter. The initial plan was for two series, the first an adaptation of The Forsyte Saga and the second continuing with A Modern Comedy.

Sita Williams (producer) joined the project in late 1999, and was quickly talking to writers and working on the adaptations. Casting began in 2001, initially for the leading roles of Soames, Irene, and Bosinney. (Williams had seen Damian Lewis in the miniseries Band of Brothers.)

The timing of the events in the series and in the novels differs considerably, with the first novel beginning in 1886 and the series opening in 1874. The writers understood how difficult it would be to present events in the order of the novels. Williams stated that, "The novels actually start with the engagement of June to Bosinney, in the middle of the story. You learn about Soames' wooing of Irene and about Young Jolyon's affair with the governess, Hélène, through the gossip and memories of the other characters. It's great for a novel, but not for TV. This isn't like adapting Dickens, who wrote perfect, straightforward, linear narratives. Galsworthy is more complicated than that. So we had to look at the back story and tease out the important things and put them on screen."

== Cast ==
Character	Actor	Description
Soames Forsyte	Damian Lewis	a solicitor, husband of Irene and then Annette, father of Fleur
Irene Forsyte (née Heron)	Gina McKee	first wife of Soames, lover of Bosinney, third wife of Jolyon, mother of Jon
Young Jolyon Forsyte	Rupert Graves	a painter, husband of Frances, Hélène, Irene
Frances Forsyte (née Crisson)	Sarah Winman	first wife of Jolyon, mother of June
June Forsyte	Gillian Kearney	daughter of Jolyon and Frances, engaged to Bosinney
Philip Bosinney	Ioan Gruffudd	an architect, fiancé of June, lover of Irene
Old Jolyon Forsyte	Corin Redgrave	brother of James, father of Young Jolyon
James Forsyte	John Carlisle	a solicitor, brother of Old Jolyon, father of Soames and Winifred
Emily Forsyte	Barbara Flynn	wife of James, mother of Soames and Winifred
Aunt Ann Forsyte	Judy Campbell	eldest of the senior Forsyte siblings
Aunt Hester Forsyte	Ann Bell	a spinster
Aunt Juley Small (née Forsyte)	Wendy Craig	a widow
Uncle Swithin Forsyte	Robert Lang	a bachelor
Winifred Dartie (née Forsyte)	Amanda Root	sister of Soames, wife of Montague
Montague Dartie ('Monty')	Ben Miles	a bounder, husband of Winifred
Imogen Dartie	Alice Patten	daughter of Montague and Winifred
Valerius Dartie ('Val')	Julian Ovenden	son of Montague and Winifred, husband of Holly
Hélène Forsyte	Amanda Ooms	a governess, second wife of Jolyon, mother of Holly and Jolly
Holly Dartie (née Forsyte)	Amanda Ryan	daughter of Jolyon and Hélène, wife of Val
Jolyon Forsyte ('Jolly')	Christian Coulson	son of Jolyon and Hélène
Annette Forsyte (née Lamotte)	Beatriz Batarda	a waitress, second wife of Soames, mother of Fleur
Fleur Mont (née Forsyte)	Emma Griffiths Malin	daughter of Soames and Annette, lover of Jon, wife of Michael Mont
Jon Forsyte	Lee Williams	son of Jolyon and Irene, lover of Fleur
Michael Mont	Oliver Milburn	son of a baronet, husband of Fleur
George Forsyte	Alistair Petrie	cousin of Soames and Winifred
Prosper Profond	Michael Maloney	admirer of Winifred, lover of Annette

== Episode plots for the first series: The Forsyte Saga ==
This plot summary covers the six episodes of the first series which was based on the first two novels and first interlude of John Galsworthy's trilogy The Forsyte Saga.

=== Episode 1 ===
In 1874 the Forsytes gather to celebrate Winifred Forsyte's engagement to Montague ("Monty") Dartie, a charming but penniless man. Her cousin Young Jolyon is absent, having arranged to stay at home with his infant daughter, June, and her French governess, Hélène. Jolyon and Hélène acknowledge their feelings for each other, and Jolyon announces that he intends to leave his wife Frances. As a result, he finds himself cut off from June and the rest of the Forsyte family, and forced to live on a small allowance from a family trust controlled by his uncle James Forsyte, a solicitor.

Nine years later, Young Jolyon has a son with Hélène and a daughter on the way. Seeking capital to purchase a larger house, he approaches his uncle James who, with his son and business partner Soames, refuses to make any payments beyond the regular allowance.

Soames becomes interested in the beautiful but poor Irene Heron while on business in the seaside town of Bournemouth, where Irene lives with her widowed stepmother. She initially refuses his proposal of marriage, concerned by his inability to perceive beauty in art, and to treat it as simply something to own.

Winifred gives birth to a child, Imogen. Monty gives her a string of pearls as a gift. She wonders how he could have afforded them considering that her father James did not settle money or a house on her when they married.

Under pressure from her stepmother, who cannot understand Irene's reluctance to accept such a wealthy suitor, Irene reluctantly accepts Soames's proposal on the condition that if she should not be happy he will let her go. They share an awkward kiss in the street.

Young Jolyon and Hélène are living in a modest house in St John's Wood with their two small children when they learn that Jolyon's estranged wife Frances has died. He is now free to propose to Hélène, and she happily accepts.

Two years later, Irene is trapped in a loveless marriage. Soames is obsessed with his need for an outwardly-perfect wife, and with the prospect of a son; Irene, however, finds the idea repugnant and secretly takes steps to avoid getting pregnant. She strikes up a friendship with the now 17-year-old June, who has been raised by her grandfather, Old Jolyon. June wishes to become engaged to a 26-year-old architect, Philip Bosinney, but Old Jolyon refuses to agree until Bosinney is able to earn £400 a year.

As soon as they meet, Bosinney and Irene feel an immediate attraction. Learning of her unhappiness from the talkative June, Bosinney becomes more focused on Irene and increasingly distant from June.

=== Episode 2 ===
Disapproving of June's friendship with his wife, Soames decides to move Irene away from the city to somewhere where she can be better controlled. Without telling her, he commissions Bosinney to build a country house at Robin Hill near Richmond. Bosinney's fee of £350 will be almost enough to enable him to marry June. Old Jolyon decides to renew his relationship with his son, and he pays Young Jolyon and Hélène a visit. He finds them living a bohemian lifestyle with their two children, Jolly and Holly. Young Jolyon is eking out a living selling his watercolour paintings.

Meanwhile, the Darties are living a luxurious life and have a son, Val. But Monty has been squandering money on gambling, and bailiffs arrive to recover a debt of 100 guineas. Winifred's father James is thoroughly embarrassed, especially as their house is rented in his name.

Old Jolyon has been supporting his son over the years by covertly buying his watercolours. Feeling lonely since June's engagement, he seeks out his son at his club and attempts to make amends for the family breach by handing him a cheque for £10,000. Young Jolyon does not accept, but asks him to invest it for his children.

June is planning her wedding, although Bosinney is far less enthusiastic about it than she. June becomes frustrated at never seeing her fiancé, who always seems to be busy at the Robin Hill building site. When Bosinney goes to Soames's house to discuss Robin Hill, he finds Irene alone in the drawing room. They share a kiss.

Soames and Bosinney argue about the costs of the building project. Meanwhile, Irene and Bosinney's flirtations become more overt. At last, Bosinney openly confesses his love for Irene, and he publicly snubs June in the street. Rumours of an affair spread, and are strengthened when the pair flaunt their love by dancing together passionately at a ball. June runs off in tears. In the carriage home, Irene asks Soames to release her from the marriage, as he had promised, but he refuses. At home she runs into her room and locks the door against an enraged Soames.

=== Episode 3 ===
Bosinney has exceeded the agreed cost of Robin Hill by £350 and, determined to ruin him, Soames sues for breach of contract. Confident that they can be together after the trial, Irene and Bosinney consummate their relationship. However, funds to defend the legal action are difficult to come by as new clients are reluctant to instruct an architect who is a defendant in litigation. June returns from a holiday in Switzerland and is told of the lawsuit. Despite Bosinney's infidelity, she still supports him against Soames.

Old Jolyon increasingly feels the need to reconnect with his son, and "to be a family again". To do so will result in a breach with his other relations, and he visits his brother James at his office to remove his will and his business from the family firm. He visits Young Jolyon and Hélène, offering to provide a house somewhere in the country where they can all live happily together. But the couple are wary, recognising that he will choose the house and that they will have little say. They explain that one can be happy despite poverty.

One night, Soames comes to Irene's room unannounced, and rapes her. The maid hears her screaming but can do nothing. Irene visits Bosinney at his apartment the next day, and he discovers the truth. In an uncontrollable rage, he heads out to confront Soames, but is unable to find him. As he runs through the foggy London streets, he is run over by a cab and killed.

When Bosinney does not appear at the court hearing the next morning to hear that the judge has ruled against him, June goes to his apartment. Irene arrives, too, Bosinney having missed an assignation with her. The two argue.

Recognising that her engagement with Bosinney is at an end, Old Jolyon asks June what she would think of living in the country with her father and his family. She suggests that Old Jolyon should make Soames an offer for Robin Hill, knowing that Soames will evidently not now need it for his wife.

When Soames returns home from court, the maid tells him that Irene has left with two suitcases. Old Jolyon arrives, and is just making a proposal to buy Robin Hill when they are interrupted by a policeman who needs somebody to identify Bosinney's body. Old Jolyon has to break the news to June. Irene, meanwhile, has gone to Bosinney's club in search of him. Young Jolyon, also a member there, breaks the news to her. Irene is devastated, but refuses an offer to go back with Young Jolyon, insisting that she has no option but to return to Soames. Young Jolyon takes her back reluctantly, and is dismissed at the front door by Soames himself. Soames tries to convince Irene that Bosinney's death was a sign that they should be together. She goes up to her room without a word, in shock.

=== Episode 4 ===
The next day, Irene leaves again, this time for good, leaving her wedding ring behind. Soames continues to believe she will return, instructing his housekeeper to continue changing the flowers in his wife's room.

Young and Old Jolyon meet Monty at the club and are angered by his attitude towards Irene. June plans Bosinney's funeral, and gradually becomes friends with her father and with Hélène. At the funeral, June berates the hateful Soames for his part in her fiancé's death. In spite of having taken Bosinney from her, June declares that she cannot hate Irene.

Soames’s mother Emily visits her despondent son, who has taken to his bed. She reproaches herself for having raised him to “feel things too much”. The next morning, Soames rises with every appearance of being fully recovered and reconciled to the loss of Irene. Old Jolyon calls on James to repeat his offer to purchase Robin Hill from Soames, and is once again angered by the dismissive attitude of his brother and Emily towards Irene. After a tense exchange, Old Jolyon and James (acting on Soames’s behalf) agree on a sale at the full market price.

June gets on well with her father's family as they unpack their belongings at Robin Hill. She discovers a bundle of paintings of her father's, among them a painting of him that she did as a child. The family toast to "new beginnings".

Five years later, Hélène having died from pneumonia in the meantime, Old Jolyon is taking sole care of his granddaughter, Holly, while the remainder of the family is travelling abroad. One evening, Old Jolyon notices Irene at the opera. They renew their acquaintance, and he invites her to give Holly piano lessons. Irene does so reluctantly, as she is uncertain how she will be received by June. Over dinner, Irene reveals to Old Jolyon that on the night she left Soames she was on the brink of disaster when a "lady of the night" took her in and cared for her. She has since been making a living offering piano lessons, while giving what help she can to other such women. Irene and Old Jolyon see each other often, and they grow close. However, his health fails and he dies shortly before the family return home.

June is surprised to hear that Irene had been visiting Old Jolyon in the family's absence, and is angered to discover that he had made a recent codicil to his will that leaves her £15,000. The whole Forsyte family attend Old Jolyon's funeral, and there is gossip and speculation as to why he would bequeath money to Irene.

As his father's executor, Jolyon visits Irene to discuss the money bequeathed to her. She comforts him as he weeps.

=== Episode 5 ===
Twelve years later, Soames has met a young French woman, Annette Lamotte, a waitress in a restaurant managed by her mother. He makes it clear to both that he wants to start a family with Annette, though omits to mention he is already married.

Winifred's children, Imogen and Val Dartie, are now young adults. On his first visit to a casino with a friend, Val is embarrassed when his father, Monty — who has been there for some time, gambling excessively and cavorting with prostitutes — collapses hopelessly drunk at his feet. Horrified, Val returns home, followed several hours later by his father. Winifred has waited up for him, and wants to know what has happened to her pearls, which have disappeared. Monty reacts angrily, shouting that he is tired of being blamed for everything. Eventually he admits that "I gave them to a Spanish beauty, neck like a swan." After spending the night on the sofa, Monty decides to abandon his family, and leaves for Buenos Aires.

Soames insists on his sister Winifred beginning divorce proceedings, in spite of her reluctance, telling her that he intends to divorce as well. Needing recent evidence of Irene's infidelity, Soames visits Jolyon to ask if he knows of any men in Irene's life. Jolyon says that he knows little about her, but agrees to raise the question of divorce when she is next in London. He visits her flat, and she tells him that there has been no one since Bosinney, and that she cannot help Soames.

Although aware that they belong to mutually antagonistic branches of the family, Val Dartie and Holly Forsyte fall in love.

Jolyon tells Soames that he cannot help facilitate a divorce. Soames replies that in that case he will assert his marital rights. He informs Annette that he is already married, and concentrates again on Irene. Appearing unexpectedly at her flat in London, he insists that she resume the marriage. When she refuses, he follows her to the neighbourhood where she provides voluntary community service to sex workers, and demands she provide him with a son. The sex workers help her to get away. Concluding that she can never be safe in England, Irene consults Jolyon and quickly leaves for Paris.

Winifred’s divorce case reaches the court, where (tactically, to bolster her claim of desertion) she is obliged to petition for “restoration of conjugal rights”, anticipating that Monty will ignore the action. She is angered to hear from Soames that he has abandoned his own divorce plans. Soames hires a private detective to follow Irene in Paris, who reports that she has been having regular meetings with a man. It is Jolyon. Jolyon and Irene spend time together and begin to fall in love.

Val and Holly are secretly engaged but are discovered by Jolly. Jolly forces Val to prove his love for Holly by going with him to enlist in the Boer War. Dartie returns to Winifred from Buenos Aires, having run out of money.

=== Episode 6 ===
Soames travels to Paris in a final effort to reconcile with Irene. He offers her any terms she wishes, even separate houses, if only she will give him the son he craves. She firmly rejects him, telling him how much she hates him.

Holly and June become nurses, and leave to help the war effort in South Africa. Jolyon receives a telegram telling him that Jolly has died there of typhoid fever. Soon after, Soames discovers Irene and Jolyon together at Robin Hill, and he accuses them of adultery. Although not yet lovers, they concede guilt, knowing now that otherwise Irene will never be free of her husband. Soames sues for divorce on the grounds of adultery; Irene does not defend the petition.

Val is discharged from the army after being hit in the ankle by a stray bullet. He returns to England accompanied by Holly, and the couple announce that they are married and plan to move to South Africa. Val is angered by the presence of his wastrel father, and says that it would have been better if his parents' divorce had gone through.

Able to move on at last, Soames marries Annette; although she does not love him, she had always wanted children and she appreciates the luxurious lifestyle that Soames is able to provide. At a 90th birthday party for Soames's father, James, her pregnancy is announced. James says that it must be a son. The guests read in the newspaper that Jolyon and Irene Forsyte, now also married, have had a son of their own, Jon. At Robin Hill, June and Irene are reconciled.

Annette has a difficult delivery, and the doctor tells Soames to choose between saving his wife or his baby; either way, she will never bear another child. Soames tells the doctor to do what he can to save the child, trusting in Annette's youth and strength to help her pull through. Both survive, and Soames is presented with a baby daughter. A message arrives that James is dying, and Soames is forced to leave his wife's side to be with his father. He lies to him, saying that he has had a son. Soames returns home in the morning, and quickly falls in love with his daughter. Holding her in his arms, he names her Fleur.

== Episode plots for the second series: The Forsyte Saga: To Let ==
This plot summary covers the four episodes of the second series, which relate to Jon and Fleur in later life. Series Two was titled The Forsyte Saga: To Let, and portrays the last book of The Forsyte Saga, To Let.

=== Episode 1 ===
Nine years have passed since the events of the first series. June Forsyte takes her much younger half brother Jon on an impromptu visit to her Aunt Hester's. It is Hester's birthday, and a party is being held with other members of the Forsyte family, including Soames and his young daughter Fleur. Jon and Fleur are encouraged to play outside, and both children get very muddy. Back at Robin Hill, Jon talks about the "nasty man" (Soames) who had shouted at him, and Irene Forsyte expresses disappointment that June should have exposed him to that side of the family.

Eleven years later, in 1920, June is running a fashionable gallery in London and has a new exhibition. Soames and Fleur visit, not realising it is June's, and encounter Irene and Jon there. Irene is ill at ease in the presence of Soames, but Jon and Fleur are mutually intrigued, especially on discovering that they are, as Soames puts it, "distant" cousins.

Fleur discovers that Jon is staying with his half-sister Holly Dartie and her husband Val. She insists on coming to stay with them in the country, and takes the opportunity to sneak off early one morning to seek out Jon, who is helping with the harvest on the Dartie's farm, nearby. The two connect immediately, and speculate on the secrets that have created the old feud between their families. Holly reports the pair's friendship to her father Jolyon and stepmother Irene, who are concerned.

At an art auction, Soames bids for a copy of a painting by Degas of a girl who resembles his daughter. The underbidder is Michael Mont, a returned serviceman, and Soames invites him to his home to view his art collection. He comes to believe that Michael would be an excellent match for his daughter. Montague Dartie and his circle meet with Prosper Profond, a wealthy French Armenian who shares their interest in horse racing. Prosper starts a flirtation with Monty's wife Winifred, but one evening cancels a planned evening at the theatre, claiming pressure of work. Later, however, Monty sees Prosper leaving the opera with Soames's wife Annette.

Jolyon Forsyte visits his doctor and is told that he has dangerously high blood pressure and that he should not exert himself. Nevertheless, he confronts Soames, angrily insisting that he should put an end to Fleur and Jon's friendship before it goes any further. Soames thinks Jolyon a hypocrite, considering that Jolyon has always taken pride in following his own heart.

=== Episode 2 ===
Wanting to be with each other as much as possible, Fleur and Jon travel together by train back from the Dartie's. As they walk from the local station, Fleur is hailed from the riverbank by Michael Mont who has been sent by her father to row her home. Jon is jealous.

Jolyon and Irene are desperate to frustrate Jon and Fleur's relationship, and they agree that Irene will take Jon on an extended visit to Paris. While they are away, Soames and Annette host a country weekend to encourage a match between Fleur and Michael; however, Fleur is pining for Jon and does not warm to Michael's advances. In the garden, Fleur see her mother and Prosper in each other's arms.

Curious about Jon's home, Fleur walks over to take a look at Robin Hill. Jolyon, who does not know who she is, invites her in for lemonade and tells her of his loneliness and his poor health. In Paris, Irene cannot persuade Jon to forget Fleur, and mother and son return earlier than expected. Jon and Fleur immediately reunite. Jon is uneasy that Fleur visited Robin Hill in his absence, and Jolyon is outraged at the – as he sees it – deliberate deception.

At home, Fleur finds a photograph of Irene concealed behind a framed picture of her mother, and concludes that the family feud had begun when Jolyon 'stole' Irene from Soames.

Monty Dartie is unable to pay his gambling debts, and faces expulsion from his club. Just in time, they are paid on his behalf by an anonymous benefactor – Prosper, he believes, though Prosper does not admit it. To celebrate, Monty visits a casino for what he swears will be his last gambling spree before he turns over a new leaf. He finds himself on a winning streak and leaves at midnight with his winnings, a thick wad of banknotes. On the way home, Dartie's car swerves to avoid a horse, and Dartie is killed. At his funeral, Soames takes charge of the banknotes and promises to invest them on behalf of his sister and Monty's widow, Winifred.

Soames receives an anonymous letter informing him of Annette's relationship with Prosper. She does not deny it, and Soames resigns himself to the fact that he has an unfaithful wife for a second time. Winifred realises that she means little to Prosper, who seems more interested in Annette.

Prosper tells Fleur that her father and Jon's mother were formerly married and subsequently divorced. Fleur goes to Robin Hill to tell Jon, and is forced to take an uncomfortable tea with Irene and Jolyon. After an argument with his father, who considers Fleur manipulative, Jon packs a suitcase and leaves.

=== Episode 3 ===
Fleur arrives at the cottage where Jon is staying and offers physical intimacy, though Jon is not ready. While Jon is out working one day, Jolyon arrives and implores Fleur to give up his son, explaining that he is ill and needs Jon by his side. She reluctantly promises Jolyon that she will do so. When Jon returns, she tells him of his father's visit, though without mentioning her promise; instead, she proposes that the couple should elope to Scotland where they do not need parental consent to marry. They agree to do so at the earliest possible date.

Prosper tells Annette that he has tired of England and is going abroad. Michael Mont seeks Soames's consent to become a formal suitor for Fleur's hand in marriage. He agrees, though says that any decision will be up to her.

The families attend the Eton-Harrow cricket match where Jolyon sees Jon and Fleur together and realises that Fleur has lied to him about giving up Jon. Prosper arrives unexpectedly, having not gone abroad, and manages to woo back Annette. He publicly asks her to come to Paris with him, and Annette agrees. Soames declares he will wash his hands of her.

Back at Robin Hill, Jolyon at last tells Irene of his serious heart condition, and they agree to tell Jon the truth about the past. After the painful confession to Jon, Jolyon suffers a heart attack and dies in the arms of his wife and son.

Fleur waits at the railway station for Jon to join her for their elopement to Scotland, but he does not appear, having just attended his father's funeral. Fleur goes to Robin Hill to tell a reluctant Jon that they should leave without delay. Jon, grief-stricken and emotional, gives in to temptation and he and Fleur make love in the summerhouse. The couple are caught by June who berates Jon for being so stupid and unfeeling on that day of all days. Irene tells Jon that although he and Fleur are still very young, if they are truly in love she will not stand in the way of their relationship.

=== Episode 4 ===
Fleur tells her father that nothing can prevent her and Jon from being together, and she convinces Soames to visit Irene to plead her case. They travel to Robin Hill, and Fleur waits in the car while Soames goes inside. The encounter ends badly: Soames loses his temper and becomes aggressive. Jon refuses to see Fleur, who calls out to him from the garden. When Jon and Irene finally go out to her, she accuses Irene of trying to keep Jon all to herself insisting that "he's mine!" Jon realises that she thinks of people as possessions.

Fleur takes to her bed and refuses to see her father, whom she blames for her disappointment. Although still in love with Jon she accepts that he is lost to her, and she eventually agrees to an engagement with Michael Mont, lying about her love for him.

Prosper Profond visits Robin Hill to offer Jon some work, and tells him of Fleur's engagement to Michael. Jon is incensed that she should so quickly take up with someone else, and Prosper facilitates a meeting between them. Jon urges Fleur not to marry, and insists that he still loves her, even though he cannot bring himself to hurt his family by marrying her. She accuses him of being the one to treat her like a possession, retorting, "If you won't have me then I'll do it my own way – and I'll forget about you Jon Forsyte – I swear I will."

Fleur's anger toward her father continues until the day of her wedding, when Soames confesses to his abuse of Irene all those years ago, and laments that every time they meet, Irene can think only of that moment. Fleur softens at this revelation, convinced that it is better to be in a loveless marriage than to be exposed to heartbreak as her father was with Irene. Michael and Fleur marry.

Soames visits Robin Hill to find a notice on the gate announcing the house is available for sale or rent. He has come to give the Degas copy that resembles Fleur to Jon. Both he and Irene question whether parting the young lovers was the right thing to do, and admit that they miss the company of their children – Jon is abroad and Fleur on her honeymoon. They part, at last, with a handshake.

== Critical response ==
Critical response was positive overall. Maclean's magazine gave the series a glowing review. TIME magazine gave the production a tepid review, calling it "lush, well acted—and stale". People magazine proclaimed it the "Show of the Week," and called Lewis's performance "a constant marvel".

== DVD releases ==
DVD set	Episodes	Special features	R2 release date	R4 release date	R1 release date
Series One	6x70 minutes	• "The Forsyte Saga: On Location" featurette. • Photo gallery, cast filmographies, author's biography and book list.	23 May 2002	5 February 2007	8 October 2002
Series Two	4x70 minutes	• Photo gallery, cast filmographies, author's biography and book list.	30 June 2003	7 May 2007	24 February 2004
The Complete Series	13x57 minutes	• "The Making of THE FORSYTE SAGA": a 20-minute behind-the-scenes featurette with the cast and crew.	14 July 2004 (Cinema Club) 20 November 2006 (ITV DVD)	7 May 2007 (original release) 5 May 2008 (new slimline packaging)	9 June 2015 (DVD; via Masterpiece on PBS)

== See also ==
- The Forsyte Saga (1967 TV series)
- Masterpiece (TV series)
