= The Forsyte Saga (1967 TV series) =

1967 UK television series

- Genre: Drama
- Based on: The Forsyte Saga by John Galsworthy
- Written by: Donald Wilson; Anthony Steven; Constance Cox; Lawrie Craig; Vincent Tilsley
- Directed by: David Giles; James Cellan Jones
- Starring: Kenneth More; Eric Porter; Nyree Dawn Porter; Joseph O'Conor; Susan Hampshire; Nicholas Pennell
- Theme music composer: Eric Coates
- Opening theme: 'Halcyon Days' from The Three Elizabeths
- Country of origin: United Kingdom
- Original language: English
- No. of episodes: 26

Production
- Producer: Donald Wilson
- Production companies: BBC; Metro-Goldwyn-Mayer Television

Original release
- Network: BBC2
- Release: 7 January – 1 July 1967

The Forsyte Saga is a 1967 BBC television adaptation of John Galsworthy's series of The Forsyte Saga novels, and its sequel trilogy A Modern Comedy. The series follows the fortunes of the upper middle class Forsyte family, and stars Eric Porter as Soames, Kenneth More as Young Jolyon and Nyree Dawn Porter as Irene.

Donald Wilson adapted the novels for television and produced the series. It was originally shown in 26 episodes on Saturday evenings between 7 January and 1 July 1967 on BBC2, at a time when only a small proportion of the population had television sets able to receive the channel. It was therefore the Sunday night repeat run on BBC1, starting on 8 September 1968, that secured the programme's success, with 18 million tuning in for the final episode in 1969.

The Forsyte Saga was shown in the United States on public television and broadcast all over the world, and became the first BBC television series to be sold to the Soviet Union.

== Production ==
Donald Wilson initially intended to produce the series as a 15-part serial adapted by Constance Cox in 1959. However, Metro-Goldwyn-Mayer held the rights to the novels, having adapted the first novel A Man of Property into That Forsyte Woman in 1949. After a distribution arrangement with MGM was reached in 1965, the series developed into a groundbreaking 26-part serial, depicting the fortunes of the Forsyte family between 1879 and 1926.

The Forsyte Saga was the last major British drama serial to be made in black and white, even though the BBC was preparing for full-time colour transmission. In an interview included on the DVD release, Wilson admits he would have loved to have shot the programme in colour but delaying recording would have meant recasting and he felt he had the perfect cast for the adaptation. The series was a gamble for the BBC, with a budget of £10,000 per episode. The Costume Designer Joan Ellacott oversaw the production of 700 costumes for men, and nearly 1500 for women. Although never credited, the music that opens and closes each episode is the first movement, "Halcyon Days", from the suite The Three Elizabeths written in the early 1940s by Eric Coates. It was the second in a trilogy of mini-series Kenneth More made for BBC2.

== Plot ==
The series was adapted from the three novels and two interludes of John Galsworthy's Forsyte Saga: The Man of Property (1906), Indian Summer of a Forsyte (1918), In Chancery (1920), Awakening (1920) and To Let (1921); and Galsworthy's later trilogy A Modern Comedy.

== Cast ==
The production featured a cast of well-known character actors, of whom the film star Kenneth More was the most famous name.

- Terence Alexander as Montague 'Monty' Dartie
- Bart Allison as Parfitt
- Andrew Armour as Jack Cardigan
- John Barcroft as George Forsyte
- June Barry as June Forsyte
- John Baskcomb as Timothy Forsyte
- John Bennett as Philip Bosinney
- Christopher Benjamin as Prosper Profond
- Olwen Brookes as Bilson
- Jonathan Burn as Val Dartie
- Fay Compton as 'Aunt Ann' Forsyte
- Mischa De la Motte as Warmson
- Anne De Vigier as Imogen Cardigan née Dartie
- Karin Fernald as Anne Forsyte née Wilmot
- Susan Hampshire as Fleur Mont née Forsyte
- Sarah Hartner as Francie Forsyte
- Ursula Howells as Frances Forsyte née Crisson
- Martin Jarvis as Jolyon 'Jon' Forsyte
- Maggie Jones as Smither
- Jenny Laird as Mrs Heron (later Lomax)
- Cyril Luckham as Sir Lawrence Mont
- Kenneth More as 'Young Jolyon' Forsyte
- Lana Morris as Helene Forsyte née Hillmer
- Suzanne Neve as Holly Dartie née Forsyte
- Nora Nicholson as Aunt Juley Small née Forsyte
- Joseph O'Conor as 'Old Jolyon' Forsyte
- Dalia Penn as Annette Forsyte née Lamotte
- Nicholas Pennell as Michael Mont
- Susan Pennick as June Forsyte (nine years old)
- Robin Phillips as Wilfrid Desert
- Eric Porter as Soames Forsyte
- Nyree Dawn Porter as Irene Forsyte née Heron
- Kynaston Reeves as Nicholas Forsyte
- A.J. Brown as Roger Forsyte
- Fanny Rowe as Emily Forsyte
- Campbell Singer as Mr Lomax
- Derek Smith as Mr. Claud Polteed
- Nora Swinburne as 'Aunt Hester' Forsyte
- Margaret Tyzack as Winifred Dartie née Forsyte
- John Welsh as James Forsyte
- Julia White as Coaker
- George Woodbridge as Swithin Forsyte
- Michael York as Jolyon 'Jolly' Forsyte
- Ian Trigger as Greenwater
- Ellen Pollock as Madame Lamotte
- Bryan Marshall as Harold Blade

== Broadcast and reception ==
The series was originally shown in twenty-six episodes on Saturday evenings between 7 January and 1 July 1967 on BBC2, with each episode repeated the following Tuesday evening. This was originally intended to encourage viewers to watch BBC2, which had launched in 1964. Only a small proportion of the viewing public could receive the channel as it was broadcast on the new 625-line broadcasting system, which required a new TV set to receive, compared to the old 405-line system that BBC1 (and ITV) were broadcast on. It was when the series was later repeated on Sunday evenings on BBC1, starting on 8 September 1968, that the programme's success was secured with 18 million people watching the final episode in 1969. It is often said that publicans and clergymen in the United Kingdom complained that the Sunday night repeats were driving away their patrons and there are tales of Sunday Evensong services being moved to prevent a clash with the broadcast. A retrospective on the series when it was screened by the American PBS in the Masterpiece Theatre slot comments,

Viewers remember the way the nation shut down each Sunday night for the event. Pubs closed early and the streets were deserted. The Church even rescheduled its evening worship services so that the immense audience could be ready for the start of the show at 7:25p.m.

Following its success in Britain, the series was shown in the United States on public television and broadcast all over the world and became the first BBC television programme to be sold to the Soviet Union. The world audience was estimated to be in the region of 160 million. The series won a Royal Television Society Silver Medal and a BAFTA for Best Drama Series or Serial. Following its transmission in 1967 by RTÉ, the Irish public broadcaster, the BBC production won a Jacob's Award at the annual presentation ceremony in Dublin. The show was so popular in Israel that the humorist Ephraim Kishon wrote a piece positing that burglars end up watching the show with the homeowners they're robbing. The series' success prompted companies to invest in similar drama serials, which resulted in programmes such as Upstairs, Downstairs and The Pallisers.

Writing after a new adaptation was produced by Granada Television in 2002, Sarah Crompton noted that even Galsworthy's novels paled in comparison to the television series, noting that the adaptation set a lasting precedent for television dramas,

Poor old Galsworthy may in his day have won the Nobel prize for literature, but now he is just a footnote in televisual history – the begetter of the most popular classic serial of all time. This is no exaggeration. One hundred million people in 26 countries ended up seeing Donald Wilson's version of the saga. It was not the first literary adaptation on TV, but it was longer and more ambitious than anything screened before, and it has come to represent every value and standard to which British TV has aspired ever since.

The series has been repeated several times on British television, with one run taking place on BBC1 from 9 January to 1 July 1970 and the final repeat being transmitted on twice-weekly weekday afternoons from 25 September to 19 December 1974. Episode 13 was repeated on BBC2 on 2 November 1986 as part of a series of programmes shown to mark the fiftieth anniversary of BBC Television. Its success and rebroadcasts has ensured that the full 26 episodes avoided wiping from the archives, and all still exist as their 625-line videotape masters. In 1992, the series was released in the UK on an 8-volume set of VHS videos, and on Region 2 DVD in 2004.

== See also ==
- The Forsyte Saga (2002 TV series)
