= Danny Griffin (actor) =

English actor

- Born: 2 July 1997 (age 29)
- Occupation: Actor
- Years active: 2017–present
- Television: Fate: The Winx Saga

Danny Griffin (born 2 July 1997) is an English actor. He is best known for his role as Sky in the Netflix series Fate: The Winx Saga (2021–2022).

== Early and personal life ==
Griffin grew up living on a farm in Cornwall, England, and has four sisters. He left Cornwall to move to London at sixteen years-old to pursue acting. He also worked as a stuntman and a stable hand as well as modelling.

== Career ==
Griffin had an early role in Free Rein on Netflix. He had a film role in British Christmas film Surviving Christmas with the Relatives (2018). Griffin portrayed the character Aslan in Guy Ritchie film The Gentlemen (2019) alongside Matthew McConaughey and Hugh Grant. Griffin appeared as Shane in Get Even for BBC iPlayer (2020). Griffin appeared in Fate: The Winx Saga opposite Abigail Cowen.

He appeared in the film Gilded Newport Mysteries: Murder at the Breakers (2024). In 2025, he could be seen as Jo in the British television adaptation The Forsytes.

== Filmography ==
=== Film ===
Year	Title	Role	Notes
2018	Christmas Survival	Maciej	
2019	The Gentlemen	Aslan	
2024	Gilded Newport Mysteries: Murder at the Breakers	Detective Jesse Whyte	Television film
2024	Drugstore June	Owen	
2025	Hello Stranger		

=== Television ===
Year	Title	Role	Notes
2017	Free Rein	Danny	1 episode
2019	So Awkward	Hunter Phillips	6 episodes
2020	Get Even	Shane	9 episodes
2021-2022	Fate: The Winx Saga	Sky	13 episodes
2025-present	The Forsytes	Jolyon Forsyte	Main cast
