= Cassandra Lee Morris =

American voice actress (born 1982)

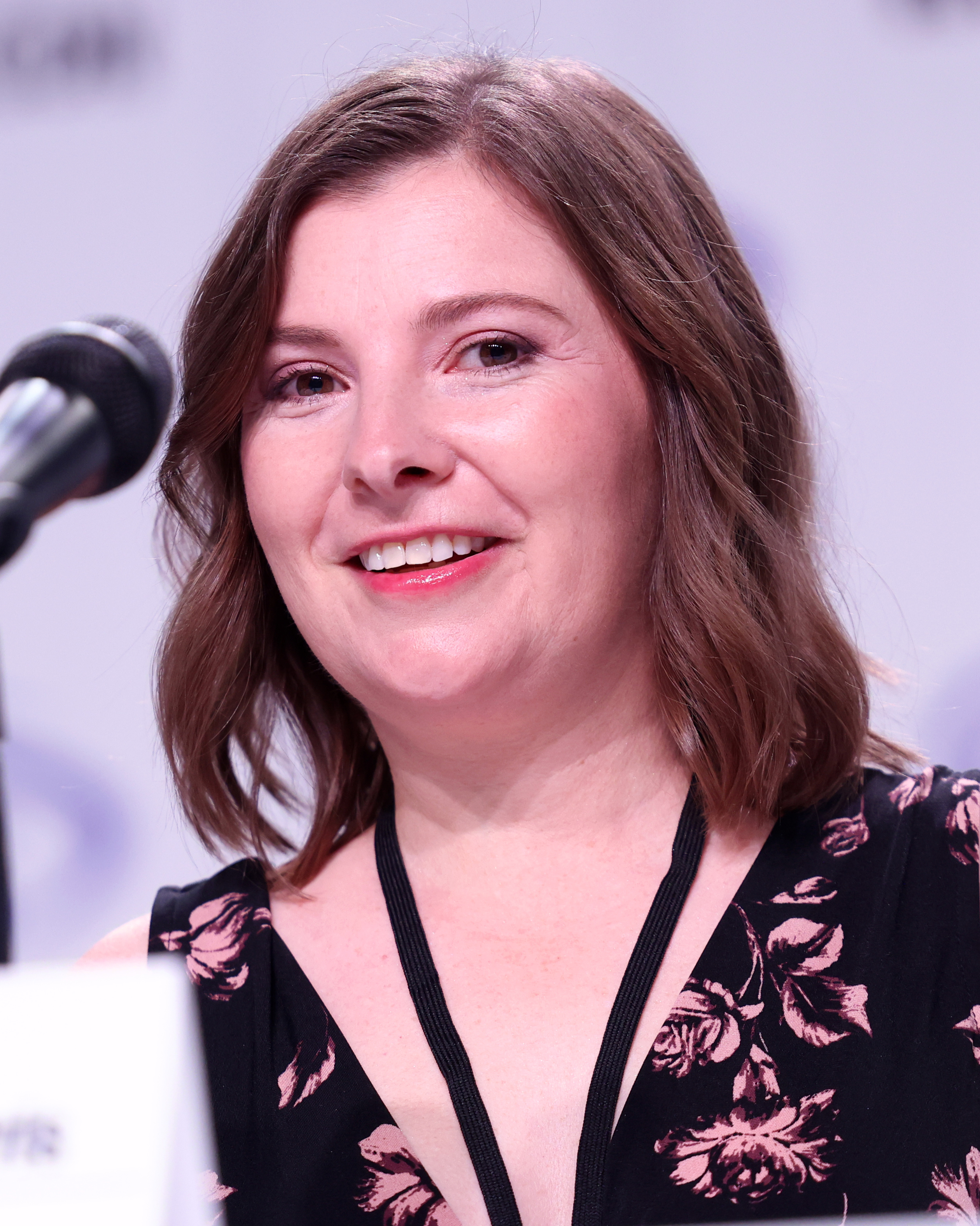
- Morris in 2026
- Born: April 19, 1982 (age 44); New Haven, Connecticut, U.S.
- Other name: Meghan McCracken
- Education: New York University (BA)
- Occupation: Voice actress
- Years active: 2005–present
- Spouse: Steve Shebby (m. 2016)
- Children: 1

Cassandra Lee Morris (born April 19, 1982) is an American voice actress. After starting her career as a teenage program host for an educational video series called Real World Science, she worked as a journalist in New York City and Los Angeles writing for local newspapers and programs as well as numerous fashion and style blogs such as About.com, David's Bridal and Patch.com. She got into voice-over starting with Alice and then Yubel in Yu-Gi-Oh! GX and has since worked on a number of animation, anime shows and audiobooks.

Her major roles include Ritsu Tainaka in K-On!, Suguha Kirigaya/Leafa in Sword Art Online, Kento Tachibana in My Daemon, Sue in Doraemon, Aoi Fukasaku in Coppelion, Kyubey in Puella Magi Madoka Magica, Taiga Aisaka in Toradora!, Hogi in the Pinkfong Wonderstar series and Pelops II in Godzilla Singular Point. In video games, she voices Fie Claussell and Alfin Reise Arnor in The Legend of Heroes: Trails of Cold Steel series, Totooria "Totori" Helmold in Atelier Totori: The Adventurer of Arland, Edea Lee in Bravely Default, Lin Lee Koo in Xenoblade Chronicles X, Operator 6O in Nier: Automata, Morgana in Persona 5, Aoi Asahina and Angie Yonaga in the Danganronpa series, Elphelt Valentine in the Guilty Gear series, Umbrella in Skullgirls, Mualani in Genshin Impact, Claret in Zenless Zone Zero, and Gali/Galacta in Marvel Rivals.

== Biography ==
=== Early career ===
Morris was born on April 19, 1982, in New Haven, Connecticut and raised in Trumbull. She grew up in an Italian-American family. She recalls her first-ever voice-over role as recording for an English as a Second Language learning cassette when she was 12. Her parents would occasionally pull her out of school to take her to auditions in New York City. When she was in middle school at around age 14, she was involved in an educational video series called Real World Science where she served as the on-screen program host as well as provide narration for the science videos being presented. She described her experience as good practice reading scripts, and noted that the producers at Mazzarella Media kept calling her back to do more videos, so she continued working on those through high school and college, where she would later help the company in production and script writing for other educational videos. She got involved in journalism when she wrote for the local newspaper The Trumbull Times where she covered high school sports. She graduated in 2004 from New York University with a Bachelor of Arts degree in Journalism and Mass Communications. In New York, she wrote for US Weekly magazine, New York Press, The Aquarian and Metro New York. She also worked as an associate producer and blogger on Cool in Your Code, a local television show that covered a different New York City zip code every episode. In 2010, she moved to the Los Angeles area, wrote for Patch.com, served as a blog writer and editor in the Prom and Formal Dances at About.com, and wrote blog articles for David's Bridal.

=== Anime and cartoon voice-overs ===
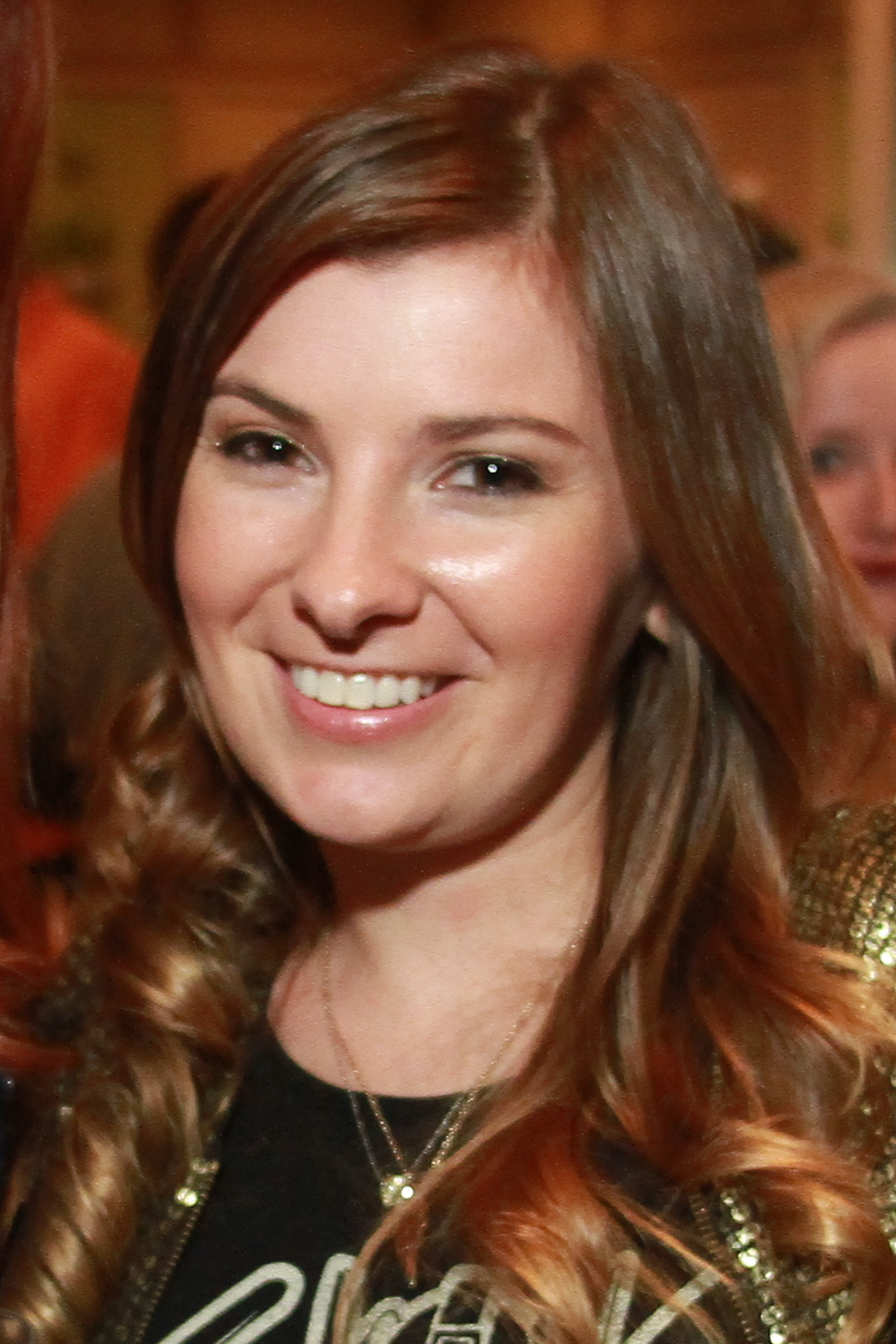
Morris in 2014

While in New York, she got involved in voice acting at 4Kids Entertainment and NYAV Post with English parts in anime dubs. Her first ever anime role was in Magical DoReMi, and her first anime television role was with Yu-Gi-Oh! GX where she voiced Alice, and later Yubel, which was her first major anime role. In an interview she said that she would get instructions on how to voice the character based on a brief description and sometimes a picture of the character. Before voicing in anime, she was only aware of a few titles such as Dragon Ball Z which her brother liked, and Sailor Moon which her friends liked. She said "It's surreal because I took the original role (in Yu-Gi-Oh) because I liked the character and, of course, as an actor you want to work, but it came with this bonus of all these fans. It's amazing to be part of such a close-knit excited community." She would later voice in Pokémon as well as cartoons such as Winx Club and Chaotic.

Morris would continue voice acting after moving to Los Angeles. In 2011 she got a starring role of Ritsu Tainaka, the drummer and outspoken character in the girl band anime K-On!. She voiced the role of Saki Mikajima in the Durarara!! series which aired on Cartoon Network and which had a sequel in 2015. In 2012, she voiced Kyubey, the mascot character in the magical girl drama Puella Magi Madoka Magica; she says Kyubey was one of the most controversial anime characters, and made people react strongly. In Sword Art Online, released in 2013, she voices Leafa. The show was broadcast on the Toonami block of Adult Swim, and ran for two seasons. In the romantic comedy Toradora, released in 2014, she voices Taiga Aisaka, the lead heroine who pairs up with a guy in order to court his best friend while he courts Taiga's best friend. She liked playing the tsundere personality of Taiga. The show was one of the first anime to be dubbed and released by NIS America. In 2014, she voiced Sue in Doraemon: Gadget Cat from the Future, the English dub of Doraemon which broadcast on Disney XD.

In the anime film Oblivion Island: Haruka and the Magic Mirror, she voiced Teo, the co-lead to the title character. She also voiced the title character in Patema Inverted, a film where her character discovers a world where everything is upside down and gravity causes her to fall to the ceiling of a room. Other anime film roles include Akiko in Time of Eve, Noriko in Welcome to the Space Show, and Natsuki in Psychic School Wars.

In cartoons, she provided the voice of Lola, one of the three main kids in the cartoon series Angelo Rules which was run on Cartoon Network as well as Netflix. Morris voiced Bubbles in the Netflix cartoon series Popples, based on the toys of the same name. She provided the voice of Frankie Stein in the Monster High reboot film, Welcome to Monster High. In the sixth season of Winx Club, she assumed the role of Diaspro, succeeding Ariana Grande, who had previously voiced the character in the second one-hour special, as well as in the third and fifth seasons.

=== Video game voice-overs ===
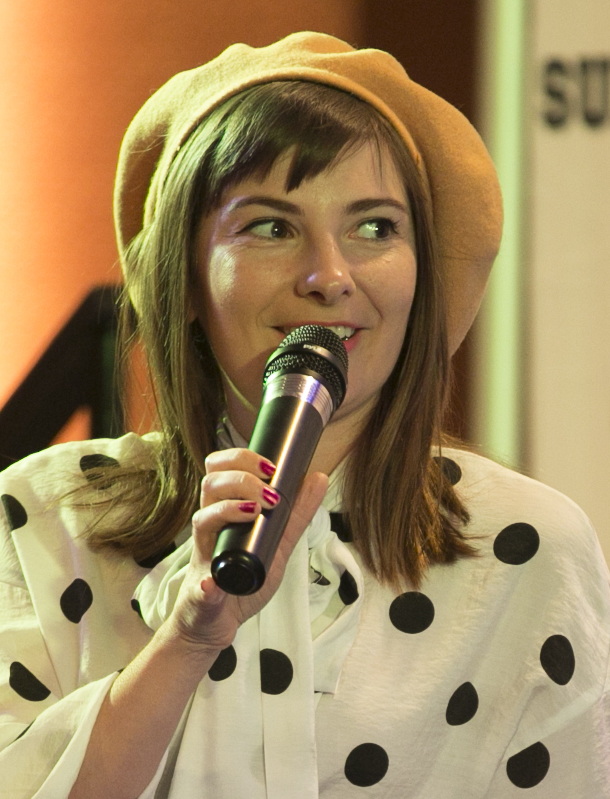
Morris in 2017

In 2011, she voiced the title character Totooria "Totori" Helmold, an alchemist, in the role-playing video game Atelier Totori: The Adventurer of Arland. Gadget Review, in reviewing the game, said that normally they would ignore the English dub adaptation for a Japanese game, but liked the English voice actors, calling them full of emotion and "always delivering their lines the way you think they should". The reviewer from The Otaku's Study found the English voice-acting for the female characters to be strong, and that she "portrayed the innocent character role effectively." Travis Bruno of Capsule Computers in Australia said that the dub "continues to impress".

In the fantasy role-playing video game Bravely Default she plays main party character Edea Lee, who she describes as a "tiny, spunky, badass warrior." and likened her to herself if she were placed in a medieval setting. She reprised her character in Bravely Second. Jason Hidalgo of Reno Gazette-Journal found the English dub to be hit or miss, but "thoroughly enjoyed Edea's hilarious 'Mrgrgr' commentary."

In Xenoblade Chronicles X, she voices Lin Lee Koo, one of the main characters in the story. She auditioned and won the role despite the only direction she was originally given was that the video game involved "space travel". Morris sought to preserve Lin's characteristics as strong female figure in her portrayal, describing her as "super smart and very self-reliant... She can cook dinner and also kick your ass." Morris's take on the character did however include using a deeper, older-sounding voice for Lin, partially to accommodate for the age change, and partially because it was believed that Western audiences would find the high-pitched Japanese version "grating". She voiced between 1,600 and 1,800 lines of dialogue for Lin—above average for a video game. In response to a controversy over Lin's bikini costumes being more covered up in the North American and European versions, Morris said that it bothered her that Lin was only 13 years old, but sees the censorship more as localization and that it would make the game open up to a wider audience.

In Persona 5, she voices Morgana, a shapeshifter character that appears as a cat during the day and guides the main character and his team through the world of shadows. Morgana was described as the mascot character of the game, which meant some "heavy pressure" for Morris as a main character in the series.

In League of Legends, she voices two champions, Nami the Tidecaller and Yuumi the Magical Cat.

In Omega Strikers, she voices Ai.Mi, a virtual assistant with pink hair and cat ears that "glitched" out of her app and into the real world via a power outage of the central server.

=== Audiobook narration ===
Morris has narrated a number of audiobooks, a few of which have earned her AudioFile magazine's Earphones Awards, the first was for the young adult novel Dear Zoe by Philip Beard in 2004. Other Earphone Award-winning titles include Salt to the Sea by Ruta Sepetys, Pip Bartlett's Guide to Magical Creatures by Jackson Pearce, and The Tapper Twins Go To War (With Each Other) by Geoff Rodkey. The audiobook The Elegance of the Hedgehog by Muriel Barbery, where Morris voiced the 12-year-old Paloma, won AudioFile's Best Audiobook of the Year and Publishers Weekly's Listen Up Award. Her narration of children's book A Snicker of Magic by Natalie Lloyd received a nomination at the 2015 Audie Awards and received the Honor Recording Odyssey Award from the American Library Association. Morris said that she has worked on many audio books for Simon and Schuster's Books For Young Readers series, where she would record at her studio in Los Angeles and would be patched over by phone line to her producer/director in New York.

== Personal life ==
Morris married songwriter and producer Steve Shebby on February 13, 2016. They live in the Los Angeles area with their son.

== Filmography ==
=== Anime ===
List of dubbing performances in anime
Year	Title	Role	Notes	Ref(s)
2005	Magical DoReMi	Melissa	Debut role	
2005–08	Yu-Gi-Oh! GX	Alice, Yubel	As Meghan McCracken	
2008–10	Yu-Gi-Oh! 5D's	Leo, Luna	(Season 1-2); replaced by Eileen Stevens	
2008	Pokémon Diamond and Pearl: Battle Dimension	Marble	Ep. 525	
2009	Pokémon Diamond and Pearl: Galactic Battles	Nathaniel	Ep. 604	
2010	Slayers Evolution-R	Uppi		
2011–16	Durarara!!	Saki Mikajima		
2012–15	Puella Magi Madoka Magica	Kyubey	Also movie	
2011–13	K-On!	Ritsu Tainaka	2 TV series and movie	
2012–13	Persona 4: The Animation	Aika Nakamura		
2013–14	Nura: Rise of the Yokai Clan series	Tsurara Oikawa (Yuki-Onna)		
2013–present	Blue Exorcist	Nee, Noriko Paku		
2013–present	Sword Art Online	Leafa, Argo (ep 3)	3 TV series and a movie	
2014	Toradora!	Taiga Aisaka	Also OVA	
2014	Doraemon	Sue		
2014	Gargantia on the Verdurous Planet	Amy		
2015	Coppelion	Aoi Fukasaku		
2015	Sailor Moon	Calaveras, CereCere	Viz Media dub	
2016	Love Live!	Tsubasa Kira		
2016	Sailor Moon Crystal	Calaveras	Ep. "Invasion -Sailor Venus-"	
2016–18	Mobile Suit Gundam: Iron-Blooded Orphans	Atra Mixta		
2016	The Asterisk War	Ernesta Kuhne		
2016–17	Kuromukuro	Koharu Shirahane		
2017	Lupin the 3rd Part IV: The Italian Adventure	Rebecca Rossellini		
2017	Glitter Force Doki Doki	Rachel Larsen / Glitter Diamond		
2017	Mobile Suit Gundam SEED	Miriallia Haw	NYAV Post dub	
2018	Twin Star Exorcists	Benio Adashino		
2018	Re:Zero − Starting Life in Another World	Anastasia Hoshin		
2019	Teasing Master Takagi-san	Mina Hibino	Season 2	
2020	Persona 5: The Animation	Morgana		
2021	Eden	Zurich		
2022	The Orbital Children	Konoha Nanase		
2023	Nier: Automata Ver1.1a	Operator 6O		
2023	A Place Further than the Universe	Rin Tamaki		
2024	Ishura	Yuno, Additional Voices	10 episodes	
2024	Go! Go! Loser Ranger!	Renren Akebayashi	5 episodes	
2025	Medalist	Ema Yamato, Seira Shishido		
2025	Tatsuki Fujimoto Before Chainsaw Man	Shiju	Ep. "Mermaid Rhapsody"	
2025	The Fragrant Flower Blooms with Dignity	Mika		
2026	Grow Up Show: Sunflower Circus	Maria		

=== Animation ===
List of voice performances in animation
Year	Title	Role	Notes	Ref(s)
2006–07	Winx Club	Chimera	4Kids version As Meghan McCracken	
2010–11	Barbie: Fashionistas	Cutie		
2010–18	Angelo Rules	Lola		
2014	Winx Club	Diaspro	Nickelodeon version, Season 6, replaces Ariana Grande	
2015	Popples	Bubbles		
2017–19	Hanazuki: Full of Treasures	Kiazuki		
2018	GO! Cartoons	Angry Woman, Sun, Kid, Artemis	Eps. "Both Brothers" and "The Bagheads: Get Trashed"	
2018–20	Barbie Dreamhouse Adventures	Stacie Roberts		
2019	DC Super Hero Girls	Lena Luthor	Eps. "#SweetJustice"	
2019	YooHoo to the Rescue	Chewoo		
2022	Barbie: It Takes Two	Stacie Roberts		
2022	Amphibia	Leif	Ep. "The Core & The King" and "All In"	

=== Film ===
List of voice performances in feature films
Year	Title	Role	Notes	Ref(s)
2017	Your Name	Sayaka Natori	Limited theatrical release	
2017	Sword Art Online The Movie: Ordinal Scale	Leafa	Limited theatrical release	
2018	Big Fish & Begonia	Kun's Sister	Limited theatrical release	
2018	Liz and the Blue Bird	Sapphire	Limited theatrical release	
2021	Sailor Moon Eternal	CereCere/Sailor Ceres	Limited theatrical release	
2021	Violet Evergarden: The Movie	Ann, Lilian, Lucas		
2022	Drifting Home	Natsume Tonai	Theatrical / Netflix release	
2026	Cosmic Princess Kaguya!	Roka Ayatsumugi	Netflix release	

List of voice performances in direct-to-video and television films
Year	Title	Role	Notes	Ref(s)
2011	Barbie: A Fairy Secret	Carrie		
2012	First Squad	Nadya		
2012	Oblivion Island: Haruka and the Magic Mirror	Teo		
2013	K-On! The Movie	Ritsu Tanaka		
2013	Blue Exorcist: The Movie	Usamaro		
2014	Patema Inverted	Patema		
2014	Welcome to the Space Show	Noriko		
2014	Time of Eve	Akiko		
2016	Psychic School Wars	Natsuki Suzuura, Natsuki Suzuura (Child)		
2016	Welcome to Monster High	Frankie Stein, Venus McFlytrap		
2016	Shopkins: Chef Club	Jessicake		
2017	Monster High: Electrified	Frankie Stein, Venus McFlytrap		
2017	Shopkins: World Vacation	Jessicake		
2018	Cinderella and the Secret Prince	Ella		
2018	Shopkins: Wild	Jessicake		
2020	Enchantimals: Secrets of Snowy Valley	Pristina Polar Bear		

=== Video games ===
List of voice performances in video games
Year	Title	Role	Notes	Ref(s)
2011–13; 2016	Hyperdimension Neptunia series	Gust		Resume
2011	Atelier Totori: The Adventurer of Arland	Totooria Helmold	Also Atelier Totori Plus	
2012, 2019	League of Legends	Nami, Yuumi		
2012	Tales of Graces F	Sophie		
2012	Unchained Blades	Lapis		Resume
2012	Dead or Alive 5	Leifang		Resume
2013	Shin Megami Tensei: Devil Summoner: Soul Hackers	Hitomi		
2013	Disney Princess Palace Pets	Berry	Phone app	
2013	Rune Factory 4	Amber	Also Special	
2014	Bravely Default	Edea Lee		
2014	Danganronpa: Trigger Happy Havoc	Aoi Asahina	Uncredited	
2014	Guilty Gear Xrd Sign	Elphelt Valentine		
2015	There Came an Echo	Grace		
2015	Final Fantasy Type-0 HD	Mutsuki Chiharano		
2015	Persona 4: Dancing All Night	Sumomo Ujima		
2015	Xenoblade Chronicles X	Lin Lee Koo		
2015	The Legend of Heroes: Trails of Cold Steel	Fie Claussell, Alfin Reise Arnor		
2016	Bravely Second: End Layer	Edea Lee	Uncredited	
2016	God Eater 2: Rage Burst	Nana Kazuki		
2016	The Legend of Heroes: Trails of Cold Steel II	Fie Claussell, Alfin Reise Arnor		
2016	World of Final Fantasy	Enna Kros		
2017	Club Penguin Island	Dot		
2017	Persona 5	Morgana		
2017	Fire Emblem Heroes	Julia, Clarisse		
2017	Nier: Automata	Operator 6O		
2017	Puyo Puyo Tetris	Ringo Ando	Uncredited (Note: This title does not list voice actors.)	
2017	Danganronpa V3: Killing Harmony	Angie Yonaga, Aoi Asahina		
2018	Epic Seven	Cecilia, Achates, Chloe		
2018	Spyro Reignited Trilogy	Elora		
2018	Persona 5: Dancing in Starlight	Morgana		
2019	Super Smash Bros. Ultimate	Morgana, Sothis	DLC	
2019	Judgment	Hashimoto		
2019	Fire Emblem: Three Houses	Sothis		
2019	Astral Chain	Marie Wentz		
2019	Catherine: Full Body	Morgana	Persona 5 DLC	
2019	Daemon X Machina	Crown Princess		
2019	Indivisible	Ginseng		
2020	Space Channel 5 VR: Kinda Funky News Flash!	Kell		
2020	Persona 5 Royal	Morgana		
2020	Deadly Premonition 2: A Blessing in Disguise	Patricia Woods		
2020	13 Sentinels: Aegis Rim	Tomi Kisaragi		
2020	The Legend of Heroes: Trails of Cold Steel IV	Fie Claussell, Alfin Reise Arnor		
2020	Yakuza: Like a Dragon	Iroha Yanagi		
2020	Bugsnax	Beffica Winklesnoot		
2021	Cookie Run: Kingdom	Cream Puff Cookie		
2021	Re:Zero − Starting Life in Another World: The Prophecy of the Throne	Anastasia Hoshin		
2021	Persona 5 Strikers	Morgana		
2021	DC Super Hero Girls: Teen Power	Lena Luthor		
2021	Nier Reincarnation	Fio		
2021	Lost Judgment	Kotoko Itokura		
2021	Guilty Gear Strive	Elphelt Valentine	Added as DLC in Season Pass 3	
2022	Gunvolt Chronicles: Luminous Avenger iX 2	Lola, Mother		
2022	Phantom Breaker: Omnia	Artifactor		
2022	Fire Emblem Warriors: Three Hopes	Sothis		
2023	Advance Wars 1+2: Re-Boot Camp	Sonja		
2023	The Legend of Heroes: Trails into Reverie	Fie Claussell, Alfin Reise Arnor, Soldiers & Citizens of Zemuria		
2023	Omega Strikers	Ai.Mi		
2023	Street Fighter 6	Li-Fen		
2023	Naruto x Boruto: Ultimate Ninja Storm Connections	Nanashi Uchiha/Hikari Uchiha		
2023	Rhapsody II: Ballad of the Little Princess	Createur Rosenqueen		
2023	Rhapsody III: Memories of Marl Kingdom	Createur Rosenqueen		
2023	Anonymous;Code	Bambi Kurashina		
2023	Like a Dragon Gaiden: The Man Who Erased His Name	Ayako		
2023	Granblue Fantasy Versus: Rising	Operator 6O		
2024	Granblue Fantasy: Relink	Additional voices		
2024	Persona 3 Reload	Additional voices		
2024	Cookie Run: Witch's Castle	Witchberry Cookie		
2024	Puyo Puyo Puzzle Pop	Ringo Ando, additional voices		
2024	The Legend of Heroes: Trails Through Daybreak	Fie Claussell, citizens		
2024	Genshin Impact	Mualani		
2024	Marvel Rivals	Gail / Galacta		
2025	The Legend of Heroes: Trails Through Daybreak II	Fie Claussell		
2025	Goddess of Victory: Nikke	Sora	Credited in-game	
2025	Trails in the Sky 1st Chapter	Lila, Anelace Elfead		
2026	The Legend of Heroes: Trails Beyond the Horizon	Fie Claussell		
2026	Zenless Zone Zero	Claret Flint		
2026	Trails in the Sky 2nd Chapter	Anelace Elfead, Lila		
2026	Grand Theft Auto VI	Jackie		

=== Live-action ===
List of acting performances in film and television
Year	Title	Role	Notes	Ref(s)
c. 1996–2004	Real World Science	Program host	Also writer	
2000	Double Parked	DiDonna		
2006–07	Cool In Your Code	—N/a	Associate producer	

=== Audio ===
List of acting performances in audio books and podcasts
Year	Title	Role	Notes	Ref(s)
2010	Pretty Little Liars	Alison DiLaurentis, Aria Montgomery, Emily Fields, Hanna Marin, Spencer Hastings, Mona Vanderwaal and various		
2010–13	The Lying Game	Sutton Mercer, Emma Paxton and various		
