= Mat Lucas =

American voice actor (born 1977)

- Born: October 27, 1977 (age 48); Carson City, Nevada, U.S.
- Occupations: Voice actor, editor
- Years active: 2002–present
- Known for: Voice of Anakin Skywalker in numerous projects

Mat Lucas (born October 27, 1977) is an American voice actor, who is most notable for voicing the Star Wars character Anakin Skywalker in the series Star Wars: Clone Wars and various video games. He has also worked as an editor and in the editorial department on several projects.

== Career ==
=== Star Wars ===
The similarity of Lucas's voice with that of Hayden Christensen was highlighted from his work on Star Wars: The Clone Wars, with a Video Game Talk review of the game saying that his voice-acting "could almost pass for Hayden Christensen", while saying that overall the voice work on the game was generally good.

== Filmography ==
=== Film ===
Year	Title	Role	Notes
2007	Winx Club: The Secret of the Lost Kingdom	N/A	Voice
2010	Winx Club 3D: Magical Adventure	N/A	Voice
2013	Wolf	Marcus	Uncredited
2013	All Hallows' Eve	Attendant	
2014	Winx Club: The Mystery of the Abyss	N/A	Voice
2018	The Sonata	Justin	Uncredited

=== Television ===
Year	Title	Role	Notes
2003–05	Star Wars: Clone Wars	Anakin Skywalker	Voice; 12 episodes
2011	Winx Club: Enchantix	N/A	Voice; 45 episodes
2012	Winx Club: The Power of Believix	N/A	Voice; 27 episodes
2012	Winx Club: Beyond Believix	N/A	Voice; 2 episodes
2015	Mission: Impossible - Operation Flashfire	Benji Dunn	Fan Film
2016–17	World of Winx	N/A	Voice; 19 episodes

=== Video games ===
Year	Title	Voice role	Notes
2002	Star Wars: Galactic Battlegrounds: Clone Campaigns	Anakin Skywalker	
2002	Star Wars: The Clone Wars	Anakin Skywalker	
2004	Star Wars: Battlefront	Anakin Skywalker	
2005	Star Wars: Episode III: Revenge of the Sith	Anakin Skywalker / Darth Vader	
2005	Star Wars: Battlefront II	Anakin Skywalker	
2008	Star Wars: The Force Unleashed	Anakin Skywalker	PSP version
2012	Kinect Star Wars	Anakin Skywalker	
2013	Star Wars Pinball	Anakin Skywalker	
2014	Star Wars Commander	Anakin Skywalker	
2015	Star Wars: Galaxy of Heroes	Anakin Skywalker	
