= Star Wars: The Clone Wars (video game) =

2002 video game

- North American PlayStation 2 box art
- Developer: Pandemic Studios
- Publisher: LucasArts
- Director: Greg Borrud
- Producer: Jim Tso
- Designers: Eric Gewirtz; Jack D. Davis
- Programmer: Dan Anderson
- Artist: David Griffiths
- Series: Star Wars
- Engine: Zero
- Platforms: GameCube, PlayStation 2, Xbox
- Release: GameCube: NA: October 29, 2002; EU: November 15, 2002; PlayStation 2: NA: December 10, 2002; EU: February 7, 2003; Xbox: NA: April 22, 2003; EU: May 9, 2003; Windows: WW: November 12, 2026
- Genre: Action
- Modes: Single-player, multiplayer

Star Wars: The Clone Wars is a 2002 action game set in the Star Wars universe, developed by Pandemic Studios and published by LucasArts for GameCube, PlayStation 2 and Xbox. Additionally, the game can be purchased from the Xbox digital store and played on Xbox One and Xbox Series consoles through the Xbox backwards compatibility program.

It consists mostly of vehicular combat using clone warships, starfighters, speeder bikes and tanks, as well as missions in which players can control Anakin Skywalker, Obi-Wan Kenobi, or Mace Windu on foot. The game is set in the Star Wars prequel trilogy era, with the first level encompassing the Battle for Geonosis from Episode II: Attack of the Clones. The game also features multiplayer modes for up to four players in splitscreen, or online via Xbox Live for the Xbox. The game received mixed reviews from critics.

== Gameplay ==
Clone Wars primarily features vehicle-based combat.

The game is split up into two segments: vehicles and third-person Jedi fighting. The single-player campaign is played from the perspective of Jedi Anakin Skywalker, Obi-Wan Kenobi, and Mace Windu, who pilot vehicles and ride animal mounts. The vehicle segments involve most vehicles from the Star Wars universe: STAPs, tanks, AATs, AT-XTs, and Republic gunships. The controls used involve primary and secondary fire, acceleration and a special ability that changes from vehicle to vehicle. The Jedi segments use basic lightsaber slashing and two force powers, which rely on a force power bar, lightsaber throw and force push. In all instances it is played from a third-person perspective.

Multiplayer can be played for up to four players via splitscreen. Multiple game modes and levels are included. Duel allows two to four players to compete in free-for-all combat. Conquest is a team-based mode where players must capture and defend the most zones to win, which would be used in Pandemic Studios' later Star Wars: Battlefront titles. Control zone is a King of the hill-type mode where a single zone must be held for the longest amount of time to win. The game also featured a survival mode known as Academy. A vehicle-based version is played on the planet Thule, while an on-foot version is played in Geonosis' Petranaki Arena from Episode II: Attack of the Clones. Here up to four players control their choice of jedi or blaster-carrying characters and defend against waves of enemies. After the completion of a set of three rounds, players duel against each other. The final player standing receives bonus points, all players are respawned, and then gameplay resumes for another three rounds. Xbox Live online play was also available for the Xbox console, and featured additional downloadable levels. In line with other online-enabled games on the Xbox, multiplayer on Xbox Live was available to players until April 15, 2010. Star Wars: The Clone Wars is now playable online again on the replacement Xbox Live servers called Insignia.

== Plot ==
The game begins with the Battle of Geonosis from Episode II: Attack of the Clones. Jedi Masters Mace Windu and Luminara Unduli lead a strike force of Jedi to weaken Separatist defenses and rescue Anakin Skywalker and Obi-Wan Kenobi. As Anakin and Obi-Wan are rescued, an army of Clone troopers arrive and battle the Separatist droid armies as Windu takes part in taking down key Separatist ships. Later on in the story, Anakin and Obi-Wan organize an evacuation of a Republic outpost on Rhen Var, leading the escape only minutes before the Separatist Army captures the planet.

One month after the Battle of Geonosis, the Republic detects unusual activity on Raxus Prime, and sends a strike force led by Anakin and Obi-Wan to investigate. On arrival, they find Separatist forces at an excavation site. They send for reinforcements to take the planet. The Republic captures Raxus Prime, but during the battle, Anakin is captured by Sith Lord Count Dooku and bounty hunter Cydon Prax.

Anakin is sent to Alaris Prime, a moon in the Kashyyyk system, to be executed. Anakin and the other prisoners are doomed to be killed by the Force Harvester, an ancient Sith weapon that drains the Force from all living things within its range. Anakin is able to escape his cell and uses a speeder to escape the Force Harvester's range. Anakin, with help from a female smuggler named Bera Kazan, infiltrates a Separatist communications outpost to contact the Republic for help. Then Anakin, Bera and the local Wookiee population hold off the Separatist forces until Republic reinforcements led by Obi-Wan arrive. Anakin and Obi-Wan then lead a counterattack against the Separatists and successfully liberate Alaris Prime.

Anakin returns to the Jedi Temple on Coruscant and informs Jedi Master Yoda and Windu of the Harvester. Windu then tells Anakin and Obi-Wan of the Dark Reaper, an ancient Sith weapon built during the Great Sith War that was so powerful that none could withstand it. It required large amounts of energy to operate, which the Harvester could provide. Windu then mentions that the Reaper was destroyed by a fallen Jedi Knight named Ulic Qel-Droma, and the remains of the Sith weapon were scattered by the Jedi across the galaxy. To learn more about the Dark Reaper, Anakin and Obi-Wan lead Republic forces to Rhen Var, Qel-Droma's final resting place, to retake the planet from the Separatists. After a long battle, Anakin is led to an ancient tomb, where he meets Qel-Droma as a Force ghost, who agrees to teach Anakin how to defeat the Dark Reaper and reveal the location of the Sith weapon. Qel-Droma at the same time warns Anakin that this knowledge and power could lead him on the path to the Dark Side. With the Dark Reaper located on the ancient Sith world Thule, Anakin, Obi-Wan, and Windu lead Republic forces to Thule to prevent the Sith weapon from being rebuilt.

Before the Republic can invade Thule, Anakin leads a strike force on the planet's moon to take out the planetary shield generator. Once on Thule, Obi-Wan and Windu lead Republic forces in eliminating Separatist defenses guarding the planet capital Kessiak, where the Sith Temple that holds the Dark Reaper is located. As the defenses fall, Republic forces enter Kessiak. While the Jedi and Republic forces battle the Separatists, Anakin enters the Sith Temple to destroy the Dark Reaper. Inside the temple, Anakin kills Cydon Prax and confronts the Dark Reaper, now operational. With guidance from Qel-Droma, Anakin is able to destroy the Dark Reaper and claim victory for the Republic on Thule. Obi-Wan acknowledges Anakin's growing power, but warns him to not let it consume him. As Republic forces are leaving Thule after the battle, Windu believes that the battle may have turned the tide of the war, but Yoda reminds him the war is far from over.

== Development ==
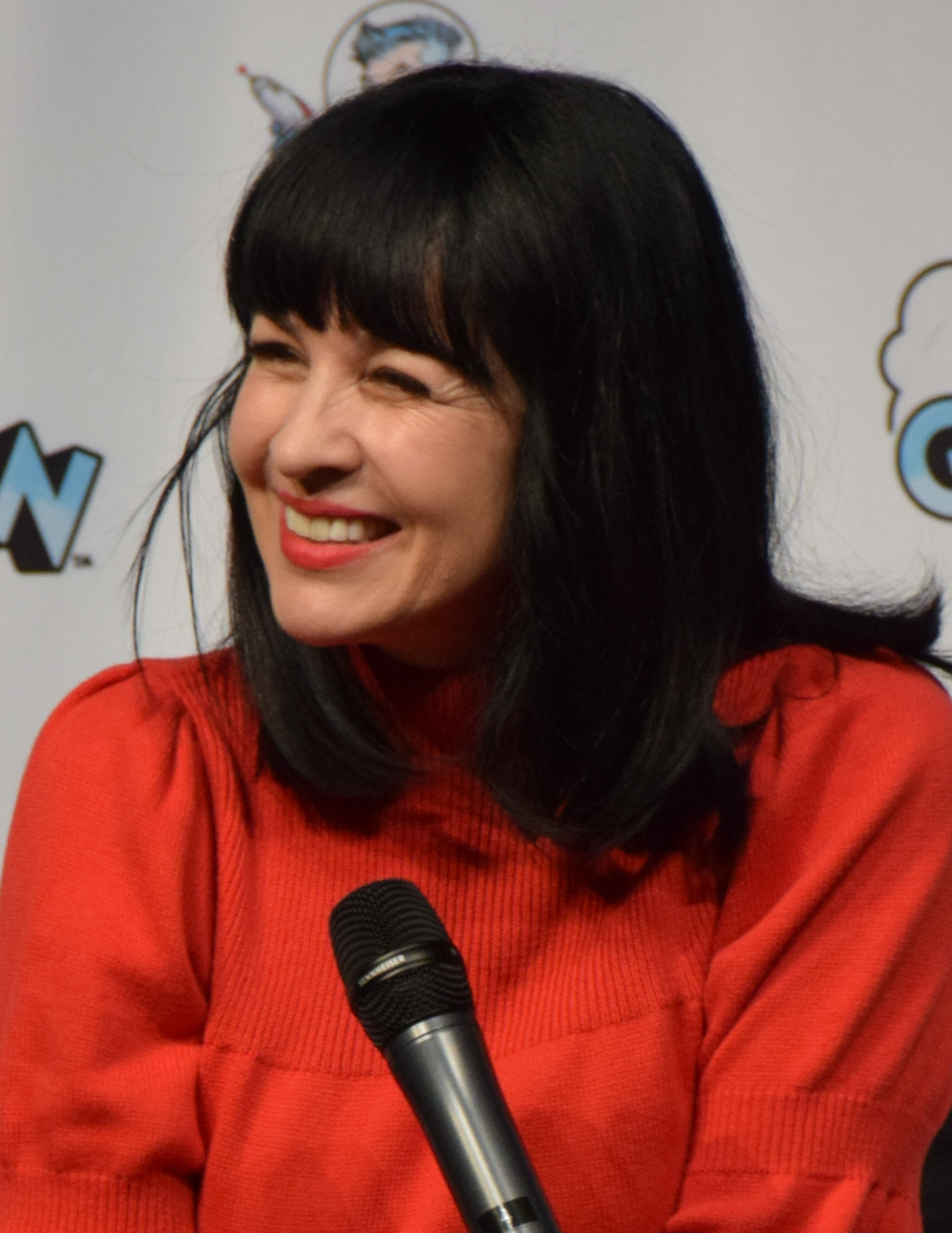
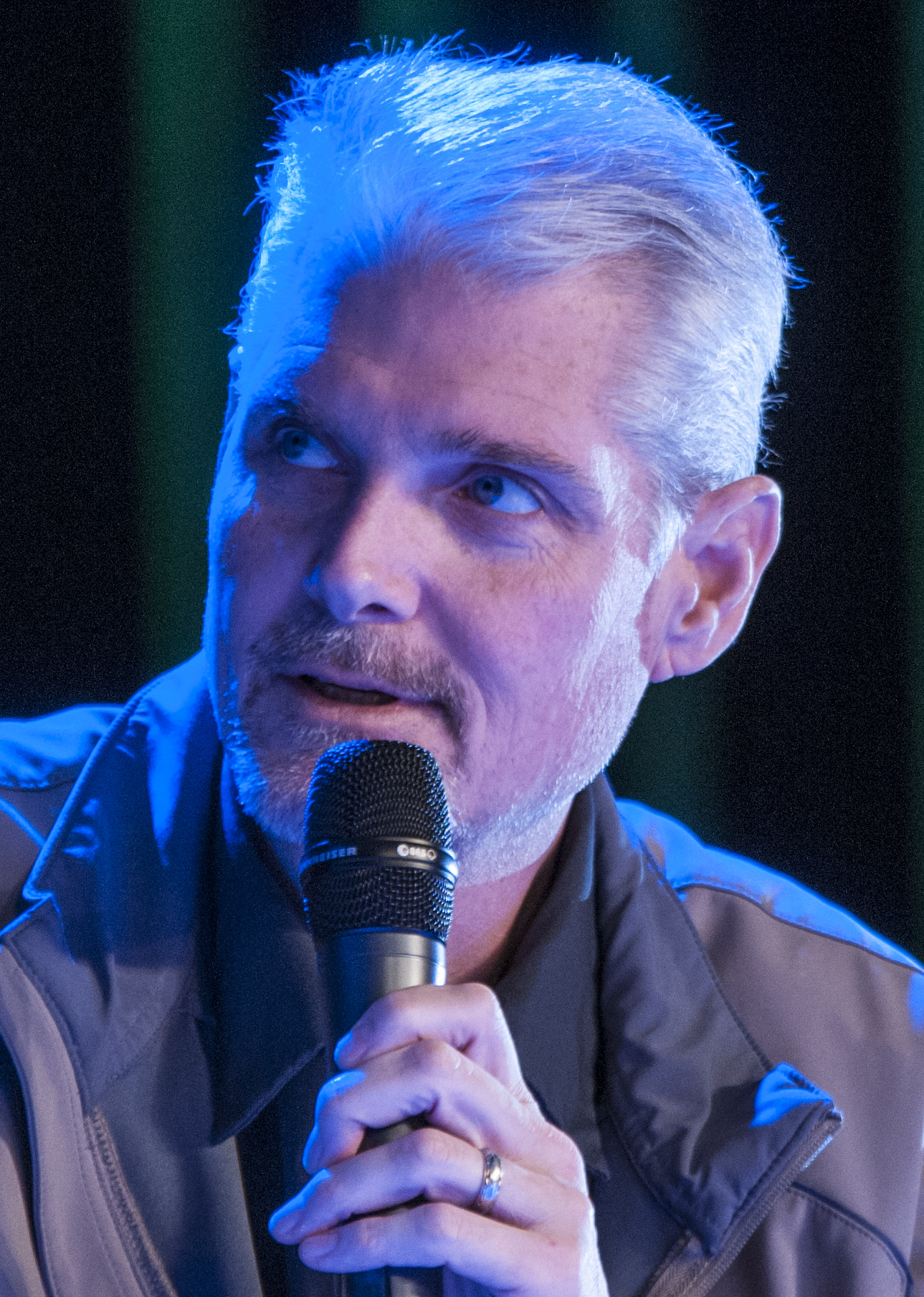
Grey Griffin and Tom Kane reprise their Cartoon Network Clone Wars roles as Padmé Amidala and Yoda.

Star Wars: The Clone Wars was announced on May 16, 2002, for GameCube and PlayStation 2. The Xbox version was announced on January 30, 2003. The game was developed by Pandemic Studios and published by LucasArts. It was shown at the Electronic Entertainment Expo (E3) 2002 in Los Angeles, California a short time later. The GameCube version was released October 2002. The PlayStation 2 release followed in December of that year. On February 5, 2003, LucasArts announced that the Xbox version would feature online multiplayer through Xbox Live. It was slated to be released March 2003, and released a month later. The Xbox version would later be bundled with Tetris Worlds in an Xbox console package.

The game is powered by Pandemic Studios Zero engine, which was also used for the first two Star Wars: Battlefront games. Pandemic was assisted by two other studios, Creat Studios in Saint Petersburg, Russia, which worked on the game's pre-rendered cutscenes, and Studio Mythos in Torrance, California, who assisted with character models. LucasArts also assisted with development. In total 50-60 people worked on the game. While some of the game's characters, locations and vehicles were taken directly from the films, others were newly created for the game. Additionally, models and textures from Industrial Light & Magic were provided to the Pandemic team for reference. Josh Resnick, President of Pandemic Studios said that Lucasfilm was "very easy to work with." He stated that while they did not receive final designs for many things, Lucasfilm gave Pandemic "a lot of flexibility on creating new assets, new artwork [and] new characters." Greg Borrud, Director for the game wanted to provide a strong vehicle combat game. In speaking of the core of the gameplay, noted "More or less what Rogue Leader had done for flying combat, we wanted to do for ground combat."

The game is voiced by several actors who have lent their voices multiple times in the Star Wars universe. Anakin Skywalker is voiced by Mat Lucas, who also voiced the character in the 2003 Clone Wars TV series and several video games. Grey Griffin voices Padmé Amidala and would later voice Asajj Ventress in the 2003 series and also provided voices for other games and series. Count Dooku is voiced by Corey Burton, who has portrayed Dooku since that time. Jedi Masters Mace Windu and Yoda are voiced by Star Wars veteran voice actors T.C. Carson and Tom Kane, respectively. Music is taken from the Star Wars: Episode II – Attack of the Clones's soundtrack, composed by John Williams.

== Reception ==
Reception

Aggregate score
Aggregator	Score		
Aggregator	GameCube	PS2	Xbox
Metacritic	73/100	72/100	71/100

Review scores
Publication	Score		
Publication	GameCube	PS2	Xbox
Edge	4/10	4/10	N/A
Electronic Gaming Monthly	7/10	N/A	6.83/10
Eurogamer	6/10	N/A	N/A
Famitsu	27/40	N/A	N/A
Game Informer	8.25/10	7.75/10	8.5/10
GamePro	4/5	3/5	3/5
GameRevolution	C+	N/A	N/A
GameSpot	7.5/10	7.3/10	7.5/10
GameSpy	3.5/5	N/A	3/5
GameZone	8.5/10	8.5/10	7.5/10
IGN	7.6/10	7.6/10	7.7/10
Nintendo Power	4/5	N/A	N/A
Official U.S. PlayStation Magazine	N/A	3/5	N/A
Official Xbox Magazine (US)	N/A	N/A	7.8/10
Entertainment Weekly	B	B	N/A
Maxim	8/10	8/10	N/A

The game received "mixed or average reviews", according to the review aggregation website Metacritic. It holds aggregate scores of 73 out of 100, 72 out of 100 and 71 out of 100 for the GameCube, PlayStation 2, and Xbox, respectively.

In Japan, where the GameCube version was ported and published by Electronic Arts on March 20, 2003, Famitsu gave it a score of 27 out of 40.

The game sold 3.1 million units worldwide.
