= Lin Lee =

- Xenoblade character
- Lin as she appears in Xenoblade Chronicles X: Definitive Edition
- First appearance: Xenoblade Chronicles X (2015)
- Voiced by: EN: Cassandra Lee Morris; JA: Mariya Ise

Lin Lee, full name Lin Lee Koo (リンリー・クー, Rinrī Kū), is a fictional character from Monolith Soft's 2015 role-playing video game Xenoblade Chronicles X, part of the Xenoblade series of video games.

The character herself was generally well received by critics, though Nintendo's alteration of some of her more revealing outfits between the original Japanese and her Western release in North America and Europe received more of a mixed response, eliciting much discussion about censorship and differences between cultures from journalists.

== Character design ==
=== Conception ===
Lin Lee is from Xenoblade Chronicles X's fictional planet of Mira, a largely undeveloped alien world that the remnants of humanity has crash landed on in efforts to escape the destruction of Earth. She is a thirteen-year-old female child prodigy in the realm of mechanics. She is a part of BLADE, a group working towards colonizing and developing humanity's new planet, specifically working as an Outfitter, the game's equivalent of an engineer for mechanical devices. She specializes in "Skells" — large humanoid mecha piloted by people housed inside them, something she is enthusiastic about to the point of reading Skell fan fiction. Despite the relatively serious setting and career choice, her character is still known for cracking jokes, specifically recurring allusions to cooking and eating team member Tatsu, an in-game creature of small stature called a "Nopon". As a throwback to the series's prior entry, Xenoblade Chronicles, developers designed her hair clips to be small replicas of the "Monado", the sword of the prior game's protagonist Shulk. Lin Lee's Japanese voice actress was Mariya Ise.

=== Localization ===
Initial reports claimed that in the western releases of the game, it was made so that the player could not dress her in more of the revealing costumes in the game, such as bikinis, risque shirts, or very short shorts, and some sources have also claimed that Lin's default outfit was radically changed from something more revealing. While the aforementioned outfits were indeed altered for the character, Lin's default outfit remains unaltered from the Japanese version. Some reports also showed her age as being revised up to 15 years old though this was later found to be false in the final game.

Lin's English voice acting was done by Cassandra Lee Morris. She auditioned and won the role despite the only direction she was originally given was that the video game involved "space travel". Morris sought to preserve Lin's characteristics as strong female figure in her portrayal, describing her as "super smart and very self-reliant... She can cook dinner and also kick your ass." Morris's take on the character did however include using a deeper, older sounding voice for Lin, because it was believed that Western audiences would find the high-pitched Japanese version "grating". She voiced between 1,600 and 1,800 lines of dialogue for Lin—above average for a video game.

== Reception ==
Lin's overall character was generally well received by critics. Numerous journalists noted Lin as one of the few standout characters in the game that received notable character development, and praised the humor she introduced into the game, notably the jokes about cooking and eating the character Tatsu. IB Times referred to her as "funny, impulsive, and actually rather enjoyable to watch...She's got a lot of fun dialogue, though it's a bit hard to believe that she's 13."

Lin's revision in costume design and age from her original portrayal in Xenoblade X's Japanese release to her portrayal in Western releases in North America and Europe elicited much discussion from journalists in regards to censorship and differing cultural values. While her original costume was interpreted as shocking or inappropriate by Western audiences, it was seen much more as normal and mundane in Japan. Western websites had mixed reactions to the changes. Websites like IGN and VG247 decried the changes as censorship. Others were more supportive of the changes. Kyle Nofuente of Tech Times found the changes to be "reasonable enough to tone down Lin's sexuality to a level more appropriate for her age" but conceded that Nintendo's fanbase may not be as understanding, considering the negative reaction similar changes to Fatal Frame: Maiden of Black Water. Tatiana Morris of GameZone expressed similar sentiments, stating that, while she was initially surprised at how much of Lin's design had been changed, and would usually be against it, but ultimately felt that the combination of the revealing outfits and Lin being under 18 was enough to warrant the changes in her eyes. Siliconera also felt that her age made the changes "understandable". Tom Phillips of Eurogamer found Lin's revealing costume choices questionable regardless of her age, referring to it as an "eye-opening choice of outfit for an adventurer readying for battle."

Journalists noted that many fans had negative reactions to the changes as well, complaining they constituted unnecessary censorship. The debate even inspired a response from Cassandra Morris, Lin's English voice actress who defended Nintendo's changes to the character in which she stated:

"People are calling it censorship. I really see it as localisation. There are a lot of cultural differences between Japan and the US and Europe. I, personally, don't mind that Lin's outfits were changed for the US version. My hope is that players will be able to concentrate on Lin's abilities and what she can bring to your game and what she can do for the other members of her party and not just how she looks. I also think that covering Lin up a little bit will make parents more comfortable with kids playing the game, so it also opens the game up for a wider audience."

Alexandria Burlacu of Tech Times agreed with the notion, theorizing that some may feel the changes made her more believable and realistic character for Western audiences.
