= David's Bridal =

Bridal retailer

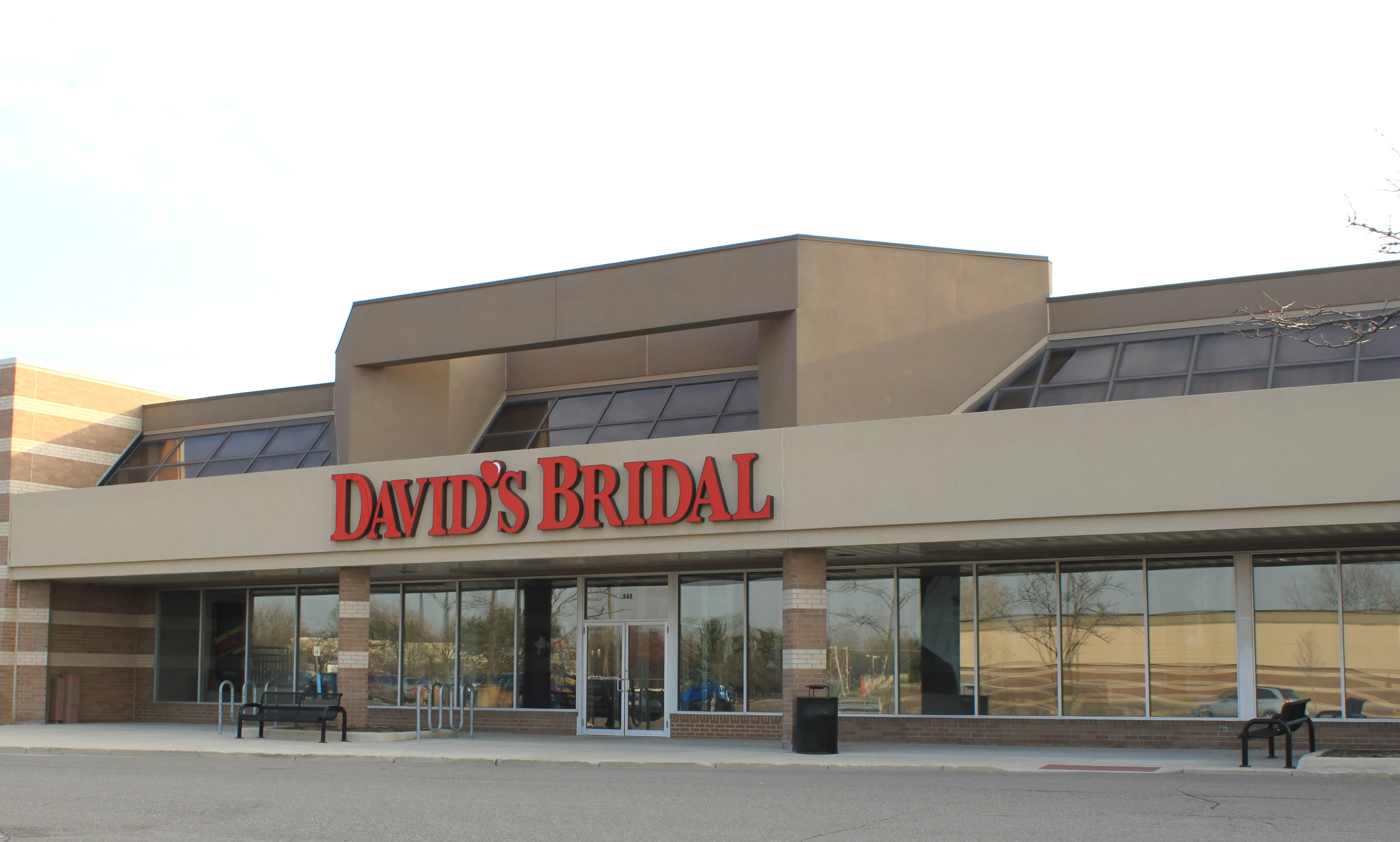
- Type: Private
- Industry: Specialty Retail
- Founded: 1950; 76 years ago Fort Lauderdale, Florida, U.S.
- Headquarters: King of Prussia, Pennsylvania, U.S.
- Number of locations: 195 stores in United States, Canada, and United Kingdom.
- Key people: Kelly Cook (CEO)
- Products: Wedding Gowns, Bridesmaids Dresses, Social Occasion Dresses, Guest of a Wedding Dresses, Prom & Homecoming Gowns, Accessories (Jewelry, Handbags, Shoes, Veils, Headpieces), Gifts
- Owner: Independent (1950–2000); May Department Stores (2000–05); Federated Department Stores (2005–06); Leonard Green & Partners (2006–12); Clayton, Dubilier & Rice (2012–18); Oaktree Capital Management (2018–2023); CION Investment Corporation (2023–present)
- Number of employees: 7,000
- Website: www.davidsbridal.com

David's Bridal is a clothier in the United States that specializes in wedding dresses, bridesmaid dresses, prom and homecoming dresses, quinceañera dresses, flower girl dresses, other formal wear, and alterations. Until filing for bankruptcy in 2023, David's Bridal operated 298 stores in 49 states, Canada, and the United Kingdom, making it the largest American bridal-store chain It sold 25-30% of all wedding dresses purchased in the United States.

Since 2000, the chain of stores has been sold numerous times and has gone through two bankruptcy filings within a five-year period. On July 24, 2023, CION Investment Corp. took control of David's Bridal after investing 20 million dollars. With a revolving line of credit and a term loan offered by Bank of America, it was announced that the chain would have 195 stores and 7,000 employees.

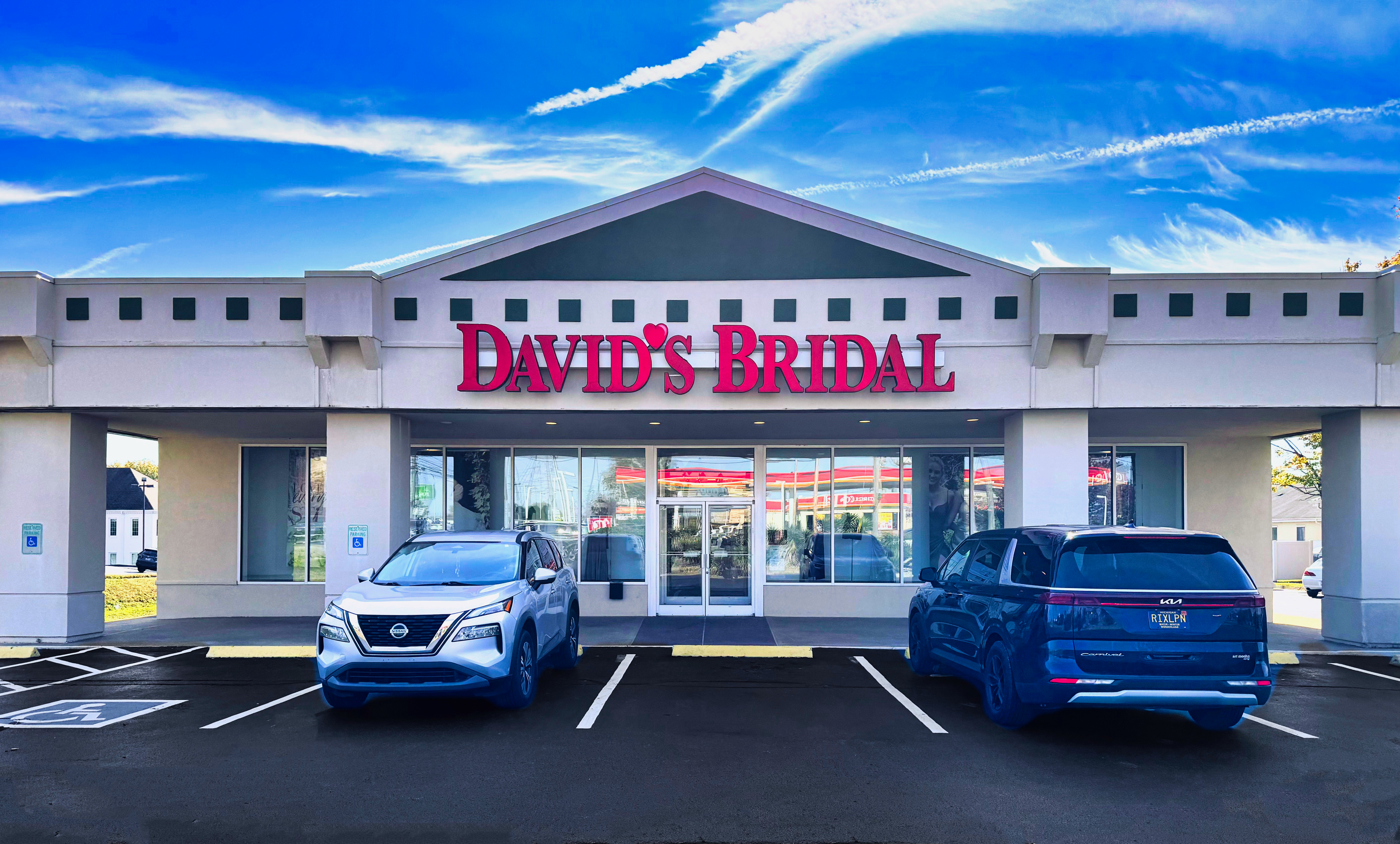
A David's Bridal store in Knoxville, Tennessee

Since its 2023 acquisition by CION Investment Corporation, the company has expanded into technology, wholesale, and marketplace businesses, including its Pearl wedding-planning platform.

== Overview ==
David's Bridal was acquired in 2000 by May Department Stores, which was, in turn, bought by Federated Department Stores (the parent company of department store giant Macy's) in 2005. On November 17, 2006, the company was purchased by Leonard Green & Partners, on the same day that Federated also divested itself of After Hours Formalwear.

On October 11, 2012, Clayton, Dubilier & Rice announced the completion of its acquisition of David's Bridal, Inc. After Oaktree Capital Management led a group of lenders that took over administration after the first bankruptcy filing in 2018, CION became the owner of the bridal-store chain after bankruptcy filing in 2023.

== History ==
David's Bridal started in 1950 as a small bridal boutique in Fort Lauderdale, Florida. In 1972, Phillip Youtie purchased the salon with intentions to open new locations. Between that time and 1988, Youtie successfully grew his investment from a single store to 18 boutiques. Many of these boutiques were leased bridal stores that were in department stores under David's Bridal name.

Steven Erlbaum, a late childhood friend of Youtie, eventually joined forces with Youtie to help bring David's Bridal to all 50 states. Erlbaum, having preexisting experience from creating the Philadelphia-based store chain Mr. Good Buys (now defunct), was able to give knowledge to Youtie.

Erlbaum and Youtie eventually incorporated the company, structuring it for the national market. A warehouse was built in Hallandale Beach, Florida. The corporate headquarters were in Conshohocken, Pennsylvania.

Stores at this time stocked only sample gowns in a standard size. Youtie and Erlbaum changed the store model in the late 1980s with a warehouse off Interstate 95 where they stocked designer gowns, discontinued dress and manufacturer overruns at below retail prices.

David's Bridal tried to create a no-frills shopping experience for customers looking for high-end, low-cost dresses. Although there was little comfort in the stores, brides-to-be could expect a bargain in a plain, warehouse-like environment.

By the 1990s, small independent bridal shops were struggling to stay in business while more David's Bridal added 12 additional stores between 1994 and 1995 alone. In 1999, the company went public with over $104 million in assets and selling 8 million shares, listed as DABR.

When May Department Stores Co. bought it from Youtie and Erlbaum for $436 million in 2000, David's Bridal was the largest retailer of bridal gowns and wedding-related merchandise. When sold to Leonard Green & Partners on November 17, 2006, it became the only nationwide competitor of bridal stores - one in four American brides are dressed by David's Bridal.

In 2012, the company agreed to be acquired by the private-equity firm Clayton, Dubilier & Rice for a price around $900 million. On October 11, Clayton, Dubilier & Rice announced the completion of its acquisition of David's Bridal in a deal that valued the company at $1.05 billion.

In August 2016, David's announced the former president and CEO of the Gap Inc., Paul Pressler as chief executive officer. In May 2018, Scott Key was named chief executive officer.

=== Bankruptcies and CION Investment Corp. ===
On November 19, 2018, David's filed for Chapter 11 bankruptcy. After emerging from bankruptcy in January 2019, the retailer was managed by a group of lenders including Oaktree Capital Group and Tom Lynch, former chief executive at Frederick's of Hollywood, succeeded Key as the interim CEO in March - it also announced the former interim chief revenue officer and CFO at National Stores, Curt Kroll, would take the role of CFO.

On June 24, 2019, David's appointed James A. Marcum as the chief executive officer, replacing Lynch who had been the interim CEO.

On April 7, 2023, it was announced that David's was considering bankruptcy for the second time in five years. A week later, on April 14, the company announced it would lay off 9,000, or 82%, of its employees from its stores, corporate headquarters, and distribution centers. On April 17, 2023, David's Bridal filed for Chapter 11 bankruptcy again, citing challenges brought on by the COVID-19 pandemic and uncertain economic conditions, and could close all of its stores and liquidate if a buyer is not found within the next few weeks. It has now announced to employees that they will be closing half of the stores - the other half of the stores that remain open are the strongest of all the stores.

On July 14, 2023, Oaktree Capital Management announced it would sell David's Bridal to CION Investment Corporation. Ten days later, CION invested and became the new owner of the retailer.

=== Omnichannel Customer Experience ===
When David's Bridal entered bankruptcy in 2019, the customer service experience was a barrier to growth. In-store pricing didn't match the prices from online sales, and returns couldn't be made in-store. “We were doing all these crazy things, like one-day flash sales online that we didn't offer in the store. And the bride's standing there with her phone,” said CEO Jim Marcum.

Since emerging from Chapter 11 bankruptcy, the brand has focused on improving its omnichannel customer experience and launched Pearl, an app-based wedding planning vendor marketplace launched in January 2023. Since 2023, David's Bridal has expanded into technology, wholesale, and licensed product lines under CEO Kelly Cook. The company launched Diamonds & Pearls, a luxury boutique concept offering gowns from $700 to over $5,000, and assumed full production of the Vera Wang Bride collection. The company also introduced a wholesale division supplying independent boutiques, and expanded its Pearl wedding-planning platform with tools including Pearl Planner, an AI budgeting tool, and Pearl Connect, a business-to-business lead-generation platform for wedding vendors. In September 2026, the company hired former Nike Canada chief financial officer Kathy Cherian as CFO to help scale its technology-driven business model.
