= Winx Club season 6 =

Winx Club
- Season 6
- English DVD cover
- No. of episodes: 26

Release
- Original network: Nickelodeon, Rai 2, Rai Gulp
- Original release: 6 January – 4 August 2014

Season chronology
- ← Previous; Season 5 Next → Season 7

The sixth season of Winx Club premiered on Nickelodeon in the United States, under the title Winx Club: Bloomix, on September 29, 2013, and on Rai 2 in Italy on 6 January 2014.

This season focuses mainly on the Trix allying with Selina, a young witch from Earth who has just enrolled at Cloud Tower as a freshman student, and who is an old childhood best friend of Bloom. The Winx must earn two new fairy transformations: Bloomix (which is derived from Bloom's almighty Dragon Flame), and Mythix to enter into the fictional Legendarium World and lock the magical book of myths and legends once and for all. In order to do so, they must also find Eldora, the Fairy Godmother, who, like Bloom, has quite a close connection with Selina, and the only one who knows how to seal the indestructible Legendarium for eternity.

== Production and broadcast ==
The season premiered in the United States on September 29, 2013 with the episode "Inspiration of Sirenix". As with the fifth season, this season is formatted in HD and includes both 2D hand-drawn animation and 3D computer animation.

== Episodes ==
No. overall	No. in season	Italian title Nickelodeon English title	Italian air date	American air date
131	1	"L'ispirazione del Sirenix" "Inspiration of Sirenix"	6 January 2014	September 29, 2013
The people of planet Domino celebrate the return of Princess Daphne. Daphne tries to adapt herself at having a body again and mourns over her disconnection from her powers. The Trix use the Beast of the Depths to crash the party. The Winx Club must find the Inspiration of Sirenix to help Daphne regain both her self-confidence and her powers. When the girls realize that they are the Inspiration of Sirenix, they inspire Daphne into having faith in herself and she transforms and orders the Beast of the Depths to return to the seas. The party then continues.
132	2	"Legendarium" "The Legendarium"	13 January 2014	November 3, 2013
Daphne starts teaching at Alfea College as the History of Magic teacher. At Cloud Tower, a freshman witch from Earth named Selina introduces herself and shows the powers of the Legendarium, a book that can make legends become reality. Back at Alfea, the students and pixies are celebrating Faragonda's one hundredth anniversary as headmistress of Alfea. The Trix take over Cloud Tower and turn Griffin into a crow, and Selina allies with them.
133	3	"Il collegio volante" "The Flying School"	20 January 2014	November 3, 2013
The Winx girls travel to Flora's home planet, Linphea, to visit the Specialists. When the Trix attack, the Winx attempt to fight back but they stripped all their powers when they confronted the Legendarium; except Bloom since her Dragon Flame can't be extinguished. Bloom then shares her Dragon Flame with her friends so that they will earn a new transformation when they perform actions worthy of real fairies.
134	4	"Il potere Bloomix" "Bloomix Power"	31 January 2014	December 15, 2013
The Trix have a strong hold over Linphea College as the Treants continue to overwhelm the students. With limited powers, the Winx Club are forced to retreat to Alfea where they focus on further increasing their inner strength, enlisting the help of both the Specialists and Paladins. The Winx and the Specialists return to Linphea to fight the Treants. Flora saves her sister, Miele, and gains her new Bloomix transformation. Selina also summons the flying basilisks to deal with Bloom and the Specialists.
135	5	"Golden Auditorium" "The Golden Auditorium"	7 February 2014	December 15, 2013
Stella and Aisha have the bravery and intelligence to avoid the flying basilisks and they earn their Bloomix powers. Daphne receives an invitation to the Golden Auditorium. Selina then summons the Pandemonium Sprites to drown the Winx Club with their shrieks. Musa and Tecna, putting their differences aside, stop the sprites and gain their Bloomix powers. The Trix head to Eraklyon Institute, where they encounter Princess Diaspro, who wants to team up with the Trix to get her revenge on Bloom.
136	6	"I mangiafuoco" "Vortex of Flames"	14 February 2014	January 12, 2014
Preparations of the coronation of Daphne, the Crown Princess of Domino, are in full swing. However, with the orders from the Trix, Diaspro is in charge of ending Bloom. Bloom has also grown weak since she shared part of her Dragon Flame with the Winx Club. Diaspro schemes to throw Bloom into the Vortex of Flames, which is underneath the palace of Domino. In addition, Selina uses the Legendarium to call forth the Fire Eaters to deal with the rest of the Winx.
137	7	"La biblioteca perduta" "The Lost Library"	17 February 2014	February 16, 2014
In class at Alfea, Faragonda asks Daphne to take the Winx to Earth to find a way to close the Legendarium for good. The Trix disguise themselves as students to accompany them and sabotage their efforts, while Selina remains at Cloud Tower. While flying around Egypt, they find the library of Alexandria. However, Selina summons the ancient mummies to stop the Winx in their tracks.
138	8	"L'attacco della sfinge" "Attack of the Sphinx"	10 February 2014	February 16, 2014
In Egypt, the Winx defeat the mummies; Selina then calls up the Sphinx to attack the Winx and the city of Alexandria. Meanwhile, Acheron (a powerful wizard trapped within the Legendarium who is Selina's mentor and master) tells Selina to seek out the diary from the library, or else he'll be locked in the book forever. While fighting the Sphinx, the Trix (disguised as Alfea fairies) cause chaos, but the Winx and Pixies resolve it. Bloom goes to find the diary in the library, which she does. To her surprise, she also finds Selina, who is revealed to be an old childhood friend of Bloom's when they were kids.
139	9	"Il tempio del drago verde" "Shrine of the Green Dragon"	3 March 2014	August 3, 2015
The Winx, Daphne, and the pixies continue the search for the fairy godmother, Eldora, and arrive in China. They visit the Shrine of the Green Dragon, one of the places visited by Eldora. Thanks to the pixies, the disguise of the Trix is discovered and they retreat. The Winx come to the Shrine, where Lu Wei, the last dragon tamer lives. Though initially reluctant to provide information to the Winx, he agrees to help when the Winx defeat the green dragons summoned by Selina. In gratitude, Lu Wei tells the Winx that Eldora often said that she was going to retire at the place where her favorite flowers grew.
140	10	"La serra di Alfea" "The Secret Greenhouse"	10 March 2014	August 5, 2015
Roxy breaks the Trix's spell on Griffin, and the three girls the Trix had ambushed and took on their appearances. Selina shows up at Alfea and lies to Bloom that the Trix captured her, but she managed to escape. Sky has his suspicions. Bloom, takes Selina in the Alfea greenhouse where she sneaks, around causing chaos. Griffin wakes up and reveals that Selina is evil and is allied with the Trix. Sky rushes off to find Flora on the ground and Bloom almost unwittingly feeding her poison that Selina disguised as medicine. After Palladium gives her a potion, Flora uses her magic to calm things down. Feeling guilty because of what happened with Selina, Bloom leaves the Winx, leaving Aisha as their leader.
141	11	"Sogni infranti" "Broken Dreams"	17 March 2014	August 7, 2015
The Winx are falling apart without Bloom, and Aisha and Stella get into a fight. Meanwhile in Gardenia, Bloom is alone, upset and depressed. The pixies can't take it and go to get Bloom back. While in her room Bloom notices the place that she played in as kids is where Eldora lives. Selina summons the Children of the Night and orders them to attack Bloom, and the pixies fight them at first. Bloom senses that her bonded pixie, Lockette, is in danger and goes to help. At Alfea, Flora tells the Winx that Eldora lives in Gardenia, and Stella and Aisha make up. Bloom and the pixies are in danger when the girls learn of this through their connection with their bonded pixies, and prepare to go to Earth to help Bloom.
142	12	"I figli della notte" "Shimmer in the Shadows"	24 March 2014	August 10, 2015
In Gardenia, Bloom is flying away from the Children of the Night. Selina orders the vampires and people under their control to attack Bloom's house. The Winx show up and chase the vampires off. After Bloom's apology, the Winx tell Bloom about Eldora and Bloom tells them she knows. They call Daphne who tells them about the vampires. The Winx go to a fashion show but are captured, except for Stella, who is signing up for a goth fashion show. Following the vampires to an old mausoleum, Stella turns the vampires to dust and frees everyone. She is able to create her designs in time for the show thanks to Bloom, and wins. She gives the trophy to Bloom, who is proud at the gesture.
143	13	"La fata madrina" "The Fairy Godmother"	31 March 2014	August 12, 2015
The Trix are observing the Winx and see them going where Eldora lives. The Winx meet Eldora, who explains her past connection with Selina. The Trix leave to go attack Eldora's house and there is a battle between the Winx and the Trix. Selina then summons ghosts that the Winx are unable to fight until Eldora steps in and destroys the ghosts, and the Trix retreat. The Winx ask Eldora to help beat the Trix and save Selina from Acheron's evil influence. She accepts and comes out of retirement.
144	14	"Mythix"	7 April 2014	August 14, 2015
Eldora tells the Winx that they must obtain Mythix. They go to Tir Nan Og to see Queen Nebula who shows to the Winx the Ancestral wands that can only used by proving themselves worthy of their power. The Trix enhance their powers and reject Selina's demand to have her powers enhanced, and they go to Tir Nan Og to battle the Winx. Selina goes to Tir Nan Og and absorbs part of Bloom's Dragon Flame in order to free Acheron before being overpowered by Bloom. Bloom destroys the power enhancement spell of the Trix, and they retreat. Having proven themselves worthy, the Winx acquire Mythix.
145	15	"Il mistero di Calavera" "Mystery of Calavera"	31 July 2014	August 17, 2015
In order to lock the Legendarium, the Winx Club must use their new Mythix wands to find the fantasy emerald. The Winx, Specialists and Paladins travel to Calavera to find the emerald that's hidden on a sunken pirate ship. Eldora informs everyone that the emerald does not exist in the real world. Instead, they must go into the Legendarium to seek it. Selina sends the Trix into the Legendarium to destroy the Winx.
146	16	"L'invasione degli zombie" "Zombie Invasion"	1 August 2014	August 19, 2015
Both the Winx and the Trix must fight against the zombie pirates that inhabit the pirate ship within the Legendarium. If the Winx do not make it out of the Legendarium in time, they can be stuck in the book forever. Eldora comes and warns the Winx about this fact and Icy overhears and the Trix leave. The pirates are still putting up a fight with the Winx. Bloom sneaks off and finds the emerald. The girls leave just in time and meet back up with Daphne, the Specialists and Paladins. The Trix scold Selina about the fact about becoming stories if they stay in the book too long. She covers herself by saying she had no clue and the Winx could be trapped. They look and of course the Winx are not trapped. So Selina sends the Oculta back to get the Winx. After a long fight against the zombies, Bloom transforms the island people into fairies and they blast the ship. The pirates retreat, leaving the island alone and go back into the Legendarium world. The Winx Club enjoy the victory while the Trix swear the next time they enter, they will not be so lucky.
147	17	"La maledizione di Fearwood" "The Curse of Fearwood"	1 August 2014	August 21, 2015
The Winx, Specialists and Paladins head to Fearwood Forest in Canada to find the Silver Spear, the second item needed to forge the Legendarium Key. However, they discover the town is haunted by a terrifying curse: the people of Fearwood turn into Werewolves at night. Selina uses the Legendarium to command the werewolves to destroy the Winx. During the fight, Icy steps in and freezes Helia's heart, then takes him into the Legendarium World. Flora goes in after them, determined to rescue Helia from the Snow Queen.
148	18	"Il totem magico" "The Magic Totem"	1 August 2014	September 9, 2015
Flora fights against Icy, the Snow Queen, to rescue Helia. She ends up defeating Icy and gets herself, Helia and the totem pole out of the Legendarium. The totem pole is able to break the Werewolf curse and is lifted from the town of Fearwood. However, Helia starts acting different since Icy cursed his heart. Worst of all, Icy uses her ice powers to attack the town and the Winx.
149	19	"Regina per un giorno" "Queen for a Day"	2 August 2014	September 11, 2015
Now that the Winx have forged the Legendarium Key, they go to Cloud Tower to lock the Legendarium for good. Before they can accomplish their goal, Darcy casts an invisibility cloak over Cloudtower. Meanwhile, Stella becomes Queen of Solaria for a day, but the power ends up going to her head. The Trix devise a plan to invade Solaria, while Selina summons the Magic Mirror to bewitch Stella as an evil Queen.
150	20	"Il banchetto di Solaria" "Stella's Big Party"	2 August 2014	September 15, 2015
Darcy, portrayed as Ariadne, had stolen Stella's crown and trapped her inside an ancient labyrinth in the Legendarium World. To get the crown back, Stella faces off against a Minotaur. When she finally manages to leave the Legendarium world, she returns to Solaria and begins to correct the mistakes she made as queen. Not long until the Trix and Selina send the Gargantua to crash Stella's party.
151	21	"Un amore mostruoso" "A Monster Crush"	2 August 2014	September 17, 2015
The Winx go to Zenith in the hope of finding a technological device that will allow them to track the invisible Cloud Tower. While visiting her home, Tecna also brings Timmy to meet her parents. Meanwhile, Selina sends the fairies the next monster, Frankenstein's Monster. However, little did the Trix and Selina realize that he did not expect to fall in love with Tecna. This causes the monster to take Tecna to the Legendarium World. Stormy decides to go into the Legendarium as the Bride of Frankenstein to prevent Tecna from escaping.
152	22	"Music Café" "The Music Cafe"	3 August 2014	November 8, 2015
While having a tough time communicating with Riven, Musa desires to find something she can call her own. She then discovers an abandoned music cafe at Alfea. Musa decides to reopen Alfea's music cafe to the school with the help of the Winx and the other fairies. By using the magic of musical instruments, Roxy and the Winx Club protect Alfea from the flying Cloud Tower. However, Selina has other plans in mind. She releases Rumpelstiltskin from the Legendarium to steal Musa's voice.
153	23	"L'inno di Alfea" "The Anthem"	3 August 2014	November 8, 2015
The Winx try to convince Rumpelstiltskin to give them Musa's stolen voice. However, he will not accept anything that does not have high value. Stella mentions the Legendarium Key, which he would graciously accept if offered. Even without her voice, Musa can control the music to save Alfea from the witches. Now they have to choose between Musa's voice and the Legendarium Key to lock the Legendarium that greedy Rumpelstiltskin wants for his collection of rare magical objects. Musa and Riven finally decide that they are not the perfect couple and go their separate ways.
154	24	"Scontro fra campioni" "Legendary Duel"	3 August 2014	November 15, 2015
The Winx and Daphne try to look for a valuable item to trade with Rumpelstiltskin for the Legendarium Key. Meanwhile, the Trix declares a duel between Alfea's strongest fairy against Cloud Tower's strongest witch. This is a duel between Bloom and Selina. Before Selina enters the fight, she releases the powerful but dangerous Champions of Alfea. The Alfea Champions attack the Winx and Alfea. While the battles are ongoing, Aisha rushes to Pixie Village to enter Gloomy Wood Forest in the Legendarium World. It is believed that rescuing all the Pixies is the key to defeating the Alfea Champions.
155	25	"Acheron"	3 August 2014	November 15, 2015
The Winx prepare the wedding for Daphne and Thoren, but while preparing, they discover that Selina has freed Acheron. However, he betrays Selina and her loyalty. Acheron then sends the Trix into the Legendarium World forever. With the power of the Dragon Flame, Acheron begins to reign over all the magic in the magic dimension. By Selina's side, Bloom fights against Acheron in the Legendarium World. Once there, Bloom puts an end to Acheron who is the supreme sorcerer of the Legendarium World by trapping him inside the Infinity Box given to her by Eldora. In exchange for Acheron who is the creator of the Legendarium World, a satisfied Rumpelstiltskin gives Bloom the Legendarium Key. However, Bloom must face the Trix before leaving the mythical Legendarium World.
156	26	"Winx per sempre" "Winx Forever"	4 August 2014	November 22, 2015
After her victory over Acheron, Bloom struggles to fight against the Trix in the Legendarium World. Once Bloom overcomes their Cage of Sorrow, she escapes with the Legendarium key. The Trix are left inside the locked Legendarium. Bloom tries to lock the Legendarium, but she is unable to do so. Only Selina can. The Legendarium is locked forever by Selina. Bloom and Selina reconcile as the best of friends once more. Eldora forgives Selina's misgivings and takes the reformed Selina back under her wing as her apprentice and Selina going back to become a fully fledged fairy once again. The Winx return to Daphne and Thoren's wedding and celebrate their wedding and Daphne and Thoren soar through the sky with their carriage.
