= Winx Club season 4 =

Winx Club
- Season 4
- Italian DVD cover
- No. of episodes: 26

Release
- Original network: Rai Due
- Original release: 15 April – 13 November 2009

Season chronology
- ← Previous; Season 3 Next → Season 5

The fourth season of the animated series Winx Club aired in Italy from 15 April to 13 November 2009, consisting of 26 episodes. The series was created by Iginio Straffi, founder of the Rainbow animation studio.

The season takes place after the events of the previous season and the feature film Winx Club: The Secret of the Lost Kingdom. The Winx Club fairies travel to Earth to protect its last terrestrial fairy from the four Wizards of the Black Circle. They also evolve their magic powers to Believix.

In 2011, the American company Viacom became a co-owner of the Rainbow studio, and Viacom's Nickelodeon began producing a Winx Club revival series. Before airing the Nick-produced episodes, Nickelodeon U.S. premiered the fourth season under the title Winx Club: The Power of Believix from May 6 to July 29, 2012. The Nickelodeon version was re-recorded with the new voice cast from Hollywood.

== Episode list ==
No. overall	No. in season	Italian title / Cinélume English title Nickelodeon English title	Italian air date	American air date (Nick)
79	1	"I cacciatori di fate" / "The Fairy Hunters" "The Wizards of the Black Circle"	15 April 2009	May 6, 2012
The Winx Club, who are now famously known for their heroics, must soon battle a new evil called the Wizards of the Black Circle that are currently searching for the last fairy on Earth. Meanwhile, a new student Clarice plays a mean prank on Flora and frames her friend Alice which they must also deal with. The girls learn from Faragonda that there are an infinite amount of higher fairy levels after Enchantix, the next one in particular being Believix, which can be used to reach out to people's hearts and help them believe in fairies. During a fight with the Wizards, the Winx discover their Enchantix powers are too weak and they must earn Believix to combat them.
80	2	"L'albero della vita" / "The Tree of Life" "Fear in Pixie Village"	17 April 2009	May 6, 2012
The Winx learn that the Wizards of the Black Circle stole all of the magic from planet Earth, and that there is one last terrestrial fairy who is revealed to be Roxy that they are looking for. Now, the Winx Club must use the Tree of Life in Pixie Village to travel to Earth and find that fairy—but they must first battle a monster that has caused all the Pixies to mysteriously vanish.
81	3	"L'ultima fata della terra" / "The Last Fairy on Earth" "Winx on Earth"	20 April 2009	May 13, 2012
After the Winx girls arrive in Gardenia, Bloom's adoptive parents, Mike and Vanessa, help them open up a new store that they decide to call Love & Pet after they transform stuffed animals into fairy pets.
82	4	"Love & Pet" "Magic Pets"	22 April 2009	May 13, 2012
While Love & Pet slowly becomes popular in Gardenia, the Wizards of the Black Circle arrive on Earth and begin their search for the last Earth fairy. Meanwhile, the Specialists have recently arrived on Earth, where Sky discovers Bloom with Andy, an old friend of hers in high school.
83	5	"Il regalo di Mitzi" / "Mitzi's Present" "Ogron's Spell"	24 April 2009	May 20, 2012
The Wizards invade Love & Pet and bewitch several of the animals. The Winx girls must round them up and find a way to reverse the spell. Meanwhile, Mitzi develops a crush on Brandon after he saves her from one of the bewitched animals. This begins to infuriate Stella.
84	6	"Una fata in pericolo" / "A Fairy in Danger" "A Fairy Found"	27 April 2009	May 20, 2012
Both the Winx and the Wizards of the Black Circle discover the identity of the last fairy of Earth: Roxy, the Fairy of Animals, who is a waitress at the Frutti Music Bar. A huge battle ensues between both sides over the new girl and only her belief in magic can help the Winx turn the tides. The Winx Club earn their Believix form and unique great magical powers after Roxy finally believes in magic and fairies.
85	7	"Winx Believix" "I Believe In You"	29 April 2009	May 27, 2012
Thanks to Roxy, the Winx girls have earned their Believix transformations. Meanwhile, Roxy is being chased all over Gardenia by the Wizards while a mysterious female voice encourages Roxy to accept her magical powers and destiny as the Fairy of Animals and as the last terrestrial fairy of Earth.
86	8	"Il cerchio bianco" / "The White Circle" "Hidden in the Country"	1 May 2009	May 27, 2012
With their new friend Roxy, the Winx travel to a farm from Roxy's childhood, where they are attacked by the Wizards of the Black Circle. Here, they find the White Circle, a powerful magical artifact that belonged to the Earth fairies and which aids Roxy in chasing away the Wizards and their Black Circle. The girls also discover their new Believix abilities to make people believe in magic and overcome their weaknesses.
87	9	"Nebula" "Nebula's White Circle"	4 May 2009	June 3, 2012
The Wizards try to capture the last fairy of Earth by using a location spell to find the White Circle. Meanwhile, Musa is debating on calling the music producer, Jason Queen. Jason remembers seeing Musa perform of the Frutti Music Bar and asks her to come in to audition. As Bloom tries to reassure Sky and Riven that they and Andy are just friends, Roxy, while holding the White Circle in her room, is suddenly possessed by another terrestrial fairy named Nebula and goes to take on the Wizards of the Black Circle alone.
88	10	"La canzone di Musa" / "Musa's Song" "The Audition"	6 May 2009	June 3, 2012
Musa's captivatingly beautiful singing voice attracts the attention of Jason, who offers her a record deal. Riven's jealousy toward Jason causes him and Musa to drift farther apart. Meanwhile, the other Winx and Roxy suffer many failed attempts to get the people of Gardenia to believe in fairies. Only when the girls help extinguish a fire created by the Wizards do the people slowly regain their belief in magic and all magical beings.
89	11	"Winx Club per sempre!" / "Winx Club Forever!" "Superheroes"	8 May 2009	June 10, 2012
While spending the afternoon at Gardenia's local mall, the Winx Club must deal with a band of bank robbers. Meanwhile, Roxy discovers that her fairy powers are beginning to grow even stronger, as she is able to make animals speak like humans though temporarily. Nabu proposes to Aisha, which she happily accepts.
90	12	"Papà! Sono una fata!" / "Dad! I'm a Fairy!" "The Pets' Pursuit"	11 May 2009	June 10, 2012
Roxy discovers that the Wizards have abducted her dad, and she is captured herself when she gets home to inform her dad of her powers. Artu, Kiko and the Love & Pet animals mount a rescue mission to save both of them, but Artu is injured by Gantlos, which results in an angered and saddened Roxy to tap into her ever-developing magical abilities and transform into a fairy at last. (Note: Identified outside the show as a Believix transformation.)
91	13	"L'attacco degli stregoni" / "The Wizards' Attack" "Roxy's Energy"	13 May 2009	June 17, 2012
Now finally having transformed into a fairy, Roxy is put to the ultimate test when the Wizards of the Black Circle threaten to destroy all of Gardenia and its citizens if she does not surrender the White Circle. However, a mysterious adult fairy appears to her in a vision and tells not to give up. Encouraged by this, Roxy attacks Ogron with a beam of magic energy, but he overpowers her easily and states that she has just condemned all of Gardenia to its destruction. In the chaos, Bloom calms all the humans down with her special Believix spell, Strength of Life and manages to defeat the Wizards in one strike of powerful Dragon Fire energy.
92	14	"7: Il numero perfetto" / "7: The Perfect Number" "Bringing Magic Back"	14 October 2009	June 17, 2012
The Winx Club and Roxy must deal with their new popularity within Gardenia while also dealing with a pair of animal smugglers.
93	15	"Lezioni di magia" / "Magic Lessons" "The New Witch in Town"	16 October 2009	June 24, 2012
The Winx Club's new popularity infuriates the Wizards of the Black Circle, so in a plot to make people hate fairies, they offer to transform Mitzi and her two friends, Darma and Sally into dark fairies. Meanwhile, Jason invites Musa to his wedding, and the Winx girls teach Roxy the basics of being a fairy, so she can further develop her magic.
94	16	"Un mondo virtuale" / "A Virtual World" "A Virtual Hideout"	19 October 2009	June 24, 2012
Tecna reveals that she has created a virtual world in her computer to hide the White Circle, but while the Winx girls go to perform at the Frutti Music Bar for the first time, the Wizards enter the virtual world to find it.
95	17	"L'isola incantata" / "The Enchanted Island" "Island Tricks"	21 October 2009	July 1, 2012
The Winx girls travel to the island of Tir Nan Og. Upon arriving, a mysterious figure keeps calling out to Roxy and a dark force soon abducts the Winx and imprisons them. Roxy frees the Earth fairies but they reveal that after having been imprisoned for so many centuries they only want cold revenge against the Wizards' who imprisoned them and declare war on all of humanity for no longer believing in magic, which had weakened the terrestrial fairies' greatly.
96	18	"La furia della natura" / "The Nature Rage" "Diana's Attack"	26 October 2009	July 1, 2012
Diana, the major Earth Fairy of Nature, begins the war against humanity by transforming Gardenia into a man-eating jungle and the Winx girls, with Roxy, have no choice but battle her minions. Meanwhile, the Specialists fight off against Diana, but are kidnapped in the process. In the end, they report Diana's actions to Headmistress Faragonda and how their Believix powers almost didn't succeed in battle, and she tells them that in order for them to defeat Diana, they must discover the great mystical power of the three Gifts of Destiny.
97	19	"Nel regno di Diana" / "In Diana's Kingdom" "In the Amazon Forest"	28 October 2009	July 8, 2012
The Winx are paid a special visit by the Ethereal Fairies, who grant them the first Gift of Destiny called Sophix (which is nature floral-themed). After gaining their new abilities, they enter the Amazon rainforest. But when they arrive, they must battle more of Diana's minions and Flora, Aisha and Musa are kidnapped. Meanwhile, Bloom, Stella and Tecna locate the source of Diana's powers: the Sacred Bud.
98	20	"I doni del destino" / "The Gifts of Destiny" "Diana's Redemption"	30 October 2009	July 8, 2012
Flora, Musa and Aisha and the Specialists (Sky, Brandon, Helia, Riven, Timmy) manage to escape Diana's fortress and meet up with the others as they realize that the Sacred Bud is connected to her; the more of the forest that is destroyed, the more Diana is weakened. The girls must save the forest as well as Diana, and also somehow manage to convince her to release Gardenia from its jungle spell. They are successful in their mission, and now Diana is trying to convince Queen Morgana not to crave vengeance on humanity.
99	21	"La caverna di Sibylla" / "Sibylla's Cave" "The Fairy of Justice"	2 November 2009	July 15, 2012
The Winx form an unlikely alliance with the Fairy Hunters to help one of them after Duman comes down with an illness. They travel to the Sibillini Mountains in Italy, where they ask Sibylla, the Fairy of Justice, for help.
100	22	"La Torre Gelata" / "The Frozen Tower" "Aurora's Tower"	6 November 2009	July 15, 2012
Aurora, the Fairy of the North, freezes all of Earth and threatens to send the planet into another Ice Age. The Winx Club, using another Gift of Destiny called Lovix, which is winter-themed, confront Aurora. Meanwhile, Roxy is getting headaches due to Morgana contacting her telepathically in order to convince her to join her quest for vengeance.
101	23	"La prova di Bloom" / "Bloom's Trial" "Bloom's Challenge"	6 November 2009	July 22, 2012
To protect Roxy, Bloom must fight Nebula, the major fairy of war, with the agreement that she drop her campaign for revenge if Bloom wins. Bloom eventually wins the fight, and the Winx girls return home. Along the way the ethereal fairies give the Winx Club the third and final Gift of Destiny, the Black Gift, which could be used to revive someone who’s died and can be used only once.
102	24	"Il giorno della giustizia" / "The Day of Justice" "The Wizard's Trap"	9 November 2009	July 22, 2012
The Winx Club return to Tir Nan Og with the Wizards of the Black Circle, but they end up in the fight of their lives when the magical kingdom is in danger. Duman betrays the Winx and the Specialists again, and Nabu kills him. Nabu makes the ultimate sacrifice to save the kingdom and "dies" in the process. When Aisha proceeds to use the Black Gift given by the Ethereal fairies, it is snatched away by the Wizards of the Black Circle. This causes Aisha to seek revenge for Nabu. In the end, Aisha quits the Winx and joins Nebula's army.
103	25	"Il segreto di Morgana" / "Morgana's Secrets" "Home at Last"	11 November 2009	July 29, 2012
Nebula overthrows Morgana and conquers the magical kingdom of Tir Nan Og. Then, she leads her army into the Omega Dimension where the remaining Wizards are hiding. After freeing Morgana, Roxy discovers that she is Morgana's daughter. Later, the Winx must face Nebula's army, led by their new lieutenant, Aisha. Morgana and the Winx are able to convince the Fairies of Vengeance not to seek revenge, but now must also convince Aisha and Nebula of the same.
104	26	"Ghiaccio e fuoco" / "Ice and Fire" "Duel in the Omega Dimension"	13 November 2009	July 29, 2012
The Wizards of the Black Circle flee as Aisha and Nebula chase them toward a dead end. Determined to avenge Nabu, Aisha teams up with Nebula to destroy the Fairy Hunters, but both are overpowered. The rest of the Winx catch up with Aisha and Nebula and all seven fairies use convergence to overpower and defeat the Wizards of the Black Circle. Morgana proclaims Nebula the new Earth fairy queen of Tir Nan Og, and then returns to Gardenia, where she is reunited with her husband, Klaus, and her daughter Roxy while Aisha returns to the Winx Club. Musa and Riven make up and get back together. At the Frutti Music Bar, Roxy makes the decision to study at Alfea before the Winx Club make one last concert. The episode ends with the girls flying over Gardenia and into the sunset, in loving memory of their fallen friend, Nabu.
