= Winx Club: The Mystery of the Abyss =

- Italian theatrical release poster
- Italian: Winx Club - Il mistero degli abissi
- Directed by: Iginio Straffi
- Written by: Iginio Straffi; Giovanni Masi
- Screenplay by: Iginio Straffi; Giovanni Masi
- Based on: Winx Club by Iginio Straffi
- Produced by: Iginio Straffi
- Starring: Letizia Ciampa; Perla Liberatori; Ilaria Latini; Gemma Donati; Domitilla D'Amico; Laura Lenghi
- Cinematography: Nuccio Canino
- Music by: Stefano Switala
- Layouts by: Alessandro Pandolfi; Gianni Travaglione
- Production company: Rainbow S.p.A.
- Distributed by: 01 Distribution
- Release date: 4 September 2014
- Running time: 82 minutes
- Country: Italy
- Language: Italian
- Budget: €12 million
- Box office: $5,337,409

Winx Club: The Mystery of the Abyss (Italian: Winx Club - Il mistero degli abissi) is a 2014 Italian animated fantasy film directed and co-written by Iginio Straffi. It is the third film based on the animated television series Winx Club, and takes place after the fifth season of the series. It follows the Winx fairies as they work to bring balance back to the Infinite Ocean after the Trix, a trio of witches, team up with a nymph named Politea to find a pearl and destroy the source of the fairies' power.

After the release of the first Winx Club movie, Iginio Straffi stated that Rainbow was "counting on" making second and third Winx films. In 2010, it was announced that Viacom, the eventual co-owner of Rainbow, would provide the resources necessary to produce the film. The Mystery of the Abyss was animated using Autodesk Maya and other programs over a period of two years.

Winx Club: The Mystery of the Abyss was released in Italy on 4 September 2014, by 01 Distribution coinciding with the series' tenth anniversary. It was released theatrically in select European regions, while most international releases were televised or direct-to-video.

== Plot ==
The story begins with a view of the Infinite Ocean, which has become overrun with pollution. The Trix appear and head for the emperor's underwater throne. Meanwhile, the Winx are preparing to teach the freshman fairies at Alfea College. At the students' welcoming ceremony, the Winx talk about the various talents hidden in a fairy. Afterwards, Bloom leaves for her hometown of Gardenia with her pet rabbit Kiko to spend a whole day with her fiancé, Prince Sky.

In the Infinite Ocean, the Trix try to gain power by sitting on the Emperor's Throne but end up summoning the nymph Politea instead. The Trix engage in a battle with Politea and learn that they cannot gain any power from the throne because it will only listen to the true emperor, Tritannus. They make a deal with Politea to get Tritannus back from the Oblivion, which they can only do with the vital force of a young prince. Once they free him, the Trix will convince him to get the mystical Pearl of the Deep for Politea, who would become freed by the pearl and then help the Trix take the throne's power.

The Trix go to Gardenia and attack Bloom and Sky. Bloom tries to fight the Trix alone and manages to escape with Sky, but the Trix get Kiko. Bloom tries to save him and gets attacked, leaving her unconscious. The Trix capture Sky and take him to the Infinite Ocean, where they tie him to the Emperor's Throne. The Trix and Politea cast a spell and Tritannus appears in front of them. Politea leaves after telling the Trix that Tritannus knows the pearl's whereabouts and warns them not to tell Tritannus anything about her. After Tritannus gains his consciousness, Icy helps him regain his memory. He tells them about the Pearl of the Deep and who has hidden it, Omnia. Tritannus sits on the Throne, gains his powers, and seals all the gateways to enter the Infinite Ocean. He and the Trix head towards Omnia's cave.

At Alfea, Bloom's friends agree to help her journey to the Infinite Ocean to save Sky. They discover that Tritannus has sealed all of the ocean's gateways except for the Oblivion portal, which leads them through a dangerous dimension. The Winx go through the portal and Bloom wakes up in an empty room, where a dark illusion of herself appears to tell her that he has abandoned Sky. When Bloom realizes that she successfully got into the Oblivion, she quickly wakes the other Winx. They break free from the Oblivion with a convergence spell.

The Winx hurry towards the Emperor's Throne, where they fight Politea. Sky gains consciousness and tells them to go to Omnia, who tells them that the Pearl was hidden in the Coral Barrier. They get there to find the Trix and Tritannus, who grabs the Pearl and leaves the Winx in the barrier with almost no way to escape. The girls leave through an underground tunnel and hurry back to the throne, where Politea finally appears in front of Tritannus and snatches the Pearl from him. She sits on the Throne, revealing that she fooled the Trix and will not follow through on their deal. The Trix try to fight her, but she hypnotizes them and Tritannus. Meanwhile, Sky breaks free from the throne, however. He ends up dying in the process, which causes Bloom to mourn. Domino's Selkie Serena snatches the pearl from Politea's hand and gives it to the Winx. The Winx Club use a convergence spell to defeat Politea and Omnia uses it to heal Sky.

Later at Alfea, Sky wakes up and asks what happened to the Trix and Tritannus. Bloom explains everything: that the Trix fled, Tritannus is once again banished to the Oblivion, and the pearl is back where it should be. Sky kisses Bloom, and Kiko comes to give Sky an ice cream.

== Voice cast ==
Character	Italian	English (Dubbing Brothers)
Bloom	Letizia Ciampa	Cindy Robinson
Stella	Perla Liberatori	Becca Ordonez-Zagorin
Flora	Ilaria Latini	Stephanie Sheh
Musa	Gemma Donati	Sarah Sido
Tecna	Domitilla D'Amico	Sabrina Weisz
Aisha	Laura Lenghi	Mela Lee
Prince Sky	Marco Vivio	Christopher Corey Smith
Icy	Tatiana Dessi	Karen Strassman
Darcy	Federica De Bortoli	Becca Ordonez-Zagorin
Stormy	Valeria Vidali	Reba Buhr
Tritannus	Alberto Bognanni	Paul St. Peter
Politea	Alessandra Korompay	Wendee Lee
Omnia	Rachele Paolelli	Colleen O'Shaughnessey

== Production ==
In November 2007, Iginio Straffi stated that Rainbow was "counting on" producing a trilogy of Winx films, and that the movies would be given theatrical releases if the box office response to The Secret of the Lost Kingdom was positive. In 2010, it was announced that Viacom (the eventual co-owner of Rainbow and owner of Nickelodeon) would provide the resources necessary to produce a new Winx Club film along with brand-new seasons of the show.

The Mystery of the Abyss was animated using Autodesk Maya and other programs over a period of two years. Around 400 people worked on the film at the Rainbow CGI studio in Rome. The Rainbow team drew around 112 preparatory sketches to design the 34 three-dimensional sets and 167 character models that were rendered for the production. The completed film contains a total of 113,221 key frames, made up of over 6 million layers. Each animator was able to produce between 0.5 and 5 seconds of animation a day. 70 minutes of music, including four original songs, were recorded for the film.

== Reception ==
=== Box office ===
In its opening weekend, Winx Club: The Mystery of the Abyss grossed $972,838 in 328 theaters across Italy, ranking No. 3 at the box office and averaging $2,966 per venue. The film made $469,301 in its second weekend, finishing seventh, and then $240,575 in its third weekend, finishing tenth. At the end of its run, Box Office Mojo recorded that The Mystery of the Abyss had grossed $5.3 million in eleven territories (including $2.3 million in Italy), against a production budget of €12 million. Box office information for the rest of the 30 territories is unknown. In a 2014 Il Fatto Quotidiano article about the decline of the Italian box office, The Mystery of the Abyss was highlighted as the only currently-playing Italian film which had grossed over a million euros (according to data from box office compiler Cinetel).

== Release ==
Rainbow announced that a third Winx film was in production at the Brand Licensing Europe event in October 2013. A teaser trailer for the film was released to YouTube on April 16, 2014. Its release date was first announced in May 2014, and it was advertised as part of the celebrations marking Winx Club's tenth anniversary as a brand. The film's title was chosen as part of a promotion on the official Winx Club website, which included a poll that asked fans to vote on one of four potential titles. Iginio Straffi and Joanne Lee, the executive producer, appeared alongside Winx mascots on the red carpet of the 2014 Venice Film Festival to promote the movie.
