= Winx Club season 5 =

Winx Club
- Season 5
- No. of episodes: 26

Release
- Original network: Nickelodeon, Rai 2
- Original release: 16 October 2012 – 24 April 2013

Season chronology
- ← Previous; Season 4 Next → Season 6

Winx Club: Beyond Believix is the fifth season of Winx Club premiered on Nickelodeon, in the United States on 26 August 2012 and on Rai 2 in Italy on 16 October 2012. It is the first season produced with Nickelodeon.

It is the first full season in the Winx Club revival series, following the 2011 specials that summarized seasons 1–2 of the original show.

In this season, the Winx face a threat underwater and will have to face a new dreadful villain, Tritannus. He was a normal triton who was mutated into a powerful demon mutant naga sea monster caused by pollution. His main goal is to become the emperor of the Infinite Ocean. He allies with the Trix and the leader, Icy, falls in love with him. The Believix power is not strong enough underwater, so the Winx start a challenging quest to get the ancient Sirenix power and become ocean fairies. It is also the first season to have the Winx return to being students at Alfea despite graduating in the first movie.

== Production and broadcast ==
Rainbow's original description of the fifth season, given at the Licensing Show 2010 in Las Vegas, indicated that all seven Winx fairies would be active members in the season (Bloom, Flora, Roxy, Stella, Musa, Tecna and Aisha/Layla). Later in 2010, however, the season was heavily reworked. The new plan was for the season to be a "total brand relaunch" and focus much less on continuing previous stories. This was the first season to be produced with Nickelodeon, the first produced in HD and the first to use computer-animated graphics. Scenes using Harmonix were in 2D, while scenes set in world of the Infinite Ocean were rendered in CGI. "The Lilo" was broadcast as the season premiere in the United States, Romania, Australia, The Netherlands, Poland, Hungary, The Czech Republic, Germany and Canada. However, this was the fifth episode produced for the season. It premiered on 26 August 2012 on Nickelodeon in the United States, and on 16 October 2012 on Rai 2 in Italy, spanning 26 episodes. Like the sixth and seventh seasons, this season premiered on Nickelodeon networks worldwide ahead of the Italian broadcasts.

== Episode list ==
No. overall	No. in season	Italian title Nickelodeon English title	Italian air date	American air date
105	1	"Minaccia dall'oceano" "The Spill"	16 October 2012	2 September 2012
In the kingdom of the Oceans of Andros, Aisha's uncle, King Neptune, is planning a coronation for one of his twin sons, Nereus or Tritannus, to become the heir. But when he chooses Nereus, he is disrupted by a masked person, who attempts to kill Nereus. After a brief fight with this person, it is revealed Tritannus, who King Neptune throws into prison. Meanwhile, the Winx are planning a rock concert at the Frutti Music Bar. Unfortunately, an oil rig visible from the beach had a leak. The Winx transform and save the workers with help from the Specialists. While helping one of the workers, Sky drops the pendant of Eraklyon into the sea, which he was going to give to Bloom. Meanwhile, Tritannus meets a trio of witches in the same prison as him, the Trix.
106	2	"L'ascesa di Tritannus" "The Rise of Tritannus"	17 October 2012	9 September 2012
The Winx Club holds a rock concert to help clean up the oil spill. Tritannus escapes from prison with the help of the Trix after absorbing the pollution from the oil spill, transforming him into a demon sea monster. The Winx find out that the Trix have escaped from prison and that a mutated demon mutant naga sea monster has control of the Gate from Andros to Earth. Aisha learns that the demon mutant naga sea monster is her cousin, Tritannus. Flora, Tecna and Aisha find that it is difficult to swim underwater with only their Believix abilities and magic does not work well and is less effective under the ocean as well.
107	3	"Ritorno ad Alfea" "Return to Alfea"	18 October 2012	16 September 2012
The Winx Club returns to Alfea and discuss with Ms. Faragonda about their new threat, Tritannus. Faragonda tells them they will need to acquire an ancient power called Sirenix to defeat Tritannus. She also informs the Winx the last fairy to acquire the power was Bloom's sister, Daphne, she knows where to find the Book of Sirenix. Bloom meets with her sister, who warns her to not seek the power, but Daphne eventually tells Bloom the Book of Sirenix is located in the Magic Archives of Alfea. The Winx, along with Sky, Brandon, Helia, and Princess Krystal, who is the princess of Flora's realm, Linphea, go into the Magic Archive to begin their search. The Trix attack the Winx and during the battle Sky takes a blow to the head that causes him to lose his memory.
108	4	"Il libro Sirenix" "The Sirenix Book"	19 October 2012	23 September 2012
Princess Krystal attempts to heal Sky's memory, but the memory of losing the pendant of Eraklyon is causing the blockage. Timmy helps Tecna update her phone to find the Sirenix Book, which the Trix secretly sabotage. When Tecna uses her cursed phone, the Winx find an ancient cursed book, which turns Tecna into a robot. The Winx find it difficult to stop her, but they manage to remove the phone from Tecna's chest and she is restored to normal, and the Winx find the Sirenix Book. Meanwhile, Nereus and Queen Ligea seek Tritannus and find him, but he turns Nereus into one of his mutant henchmen and threatens his mom to tell him about Sirenix. She tells him what little she knows, but unsatisfied, Tritannus angrily turns her into one of his mutant henchmen as well.
109	5	"Il magico Lilo" "The Lilo"	22 October 2012	26 August 2012
The Trix return and the Winx are back at Alfea for training. Ms. Faragonda calls the Winx in and tells them about the Lilo, a magical plant which is on the verge of blooming for the first time in centuries, and it is somewhere on Earth, in Gardenia. Unfortunately, the Trix are searching for the Lilo as well to strengthen their own powers. The Winx find that the Lilo is in the possession of Macy, Mitzi's little sister. The Winx try to stop the Trix from gaining the Lilo and prevail with everyone believing in them once again, making their Believix powers stronger. This episode was created as a stand-alone premiere episode, and it is not connected to the season's wider story.
110	6	"Potere Harmonix" "The Power of Harmonix"	23 October 2012	7 October 2012
Bloom tries to get Sky to remember by giving him the rose of positive. Then unexpectedly, Diaspro schemed to escaped the asylum so that she can get her revenge, by going to Alfea and try to get Sky to remember with bad ideas. The Winx Club decides to open the Sirenix book, but it won't open. So, Ms. Faragonda discusses the danger of Sirenix with them and asks them to represent Alfea at a competition in Graynor. The Winx Club try to find the creature of the Rainbow Mantle to earn the boon of the Ancestral Spirit of Nature. The Trix attack Stella, Musa, and Tecna, and Bloom, Flora, and Aisha defend them. Bloom saves a horse, who reveals itself to be the Creature of the Rainbow Mantle when the Trix try to attack it. It heals the Winx, and they win the competition. Upon opening the Sirenix Book, they are given Sirenix guardians and learn they must earn Sirenix before the next lunar cycle ends. To begin their quest, they must first find mystical gems known as the Gem of Self-Confidence, the Gem of Empathy, and the Gem of Courage. The Sirenix Guardians grant them a new transformation, Harmonix, to help them with their quest. They split up into two teams: Flora, Tecna, and Musa try to find the location Shimmering Shells in the Magic Archive while Bloom, Stella and Aisha try to find the Gem of Self-confidence in the oceans of the world, Andros.
111	7	"Le conchiglie luccicanti" "The Shimmering Shells"	24 October 2012	14 October 2012
Trying to obtain the Gem of Self-Confidence, Aisha, Stella and Flora search in the oceans of Stella's home world, Solaria. Meanwhile, the Trix and Tritannus' mutants attack Gardenia to get more toxic pollution for Tritannus to be even stronger and more powerful. Bloom, Tecna, and Musa appear with their new Harmonix powers and stop them. In the end, the Winx obtain their first gem.
112	8	"La melodia del rubino" "Secret of the Ruby Reef"	25 October 2012	28 October 2012
Tritannus raids King Neptune's underwater palace and transforms his entire family into mutants. Then he absorbs the power of his dad's mystical sword. Meanwhile, Musa, Aisha, and Stella get a second clue to Sirenix which leads them to Musa's home world, Melody. Searching for the Gem of Empathy, Tritannus transforms Musa into a monster and she is saved when she bonds with the Selkie who guards Melody's ocean gate, Sonna. Meanwhile, the Trix and Tritannus reach Daphne in Lake Roccaluce, and capture her.
113	9	"La gemma dell'empatia" "The Gem of Empathy"	26 October 2012	4 November 2012
An age-changing spell causes Stella to become a three-year-old girl. Musa, Flora, and Brandon look after her. Eventually, the spell wears off, reverting Stella to her actual age and appearance. Meanwhile, Bloom, Tecna and Aisha go to Tecna's home world, Zenith, to find the Gem of Empathy. Aisha and Tecna get into a fight and Bloom stops them as they have to work together to obtain the second Sirenix gem. They do so, and they gain the Gem of Empathy, leaving only one more challenge to gain the Gem of Courage.
114	10	"Natale ad Alfea" "A Magix Christmas"	29 October 2012	9 December 2012
Bloom plans to go home for Christmas, but the Trix cast a spell that creates ice monsters and turns the magical protection barrier against them, trapping them at Alfea. The Winx Club fights the Trix and try to make Bloom feel at home to which she gives them her gifts and calls them the best friends. After this the Trix reveal themselves, and destroy the gingerbread house. Bloom uses her Dragon Fire and melts the ice dragons and defeats the Trix. Faragonda creates decorations, and then Faragonda allows kids from Gardenia along with Bloom's adoptive parents to come to Alfea and celebrate.
115	11	"Le Trix in agguato" "Trix Tricks"	30 October 2012	11 November 2012
Red Fountain is having a scooter show. The Trix make themselves invisible and turn the scooters into a type of lion demon. The lion demon's power is far much stronger than the Winx's Harmonix. Sky has an idea on how to break the spell, and the lion demon's turn back into scooters. After the race, Flora, Musa and Stella go to Linphea for the test of courage. Bloom and Sky go on a date and are ambushed by the Trix. The Winx end up saving them.
116	12	"Prova di coraggio" "Test of Courage"	1 November 2012	18 November 2012
The Winx Club-excluding Musa and Tecna-head to Domino, Bloom's home-world, for the celebration of its restoration. But when Bloom discovers that the last and third gem is somewhere in Domino's ocean, she and her friends must leave the celebration immediately. Meanwhile, Flora's selkie finds the pendant of Eraklyon at the bottom of the ocean of Earth, and gives it to Flora. Back at the Domino palace, Flora gives it back to Sky, which restores his memory. Sky then finally gives Bloom the pendant. Sky then reveals to Bloom that Daphne is being held captive by Tritannus and forced to tell him all about Sirenix.
117	13	"Le fate Sirenix" "Sirenix"	2 November 2012	25 November 2012
Tritannus and the Trix steal Daphne's Sirenix powers and gives it to the Trix as Dark Sirenix. Meanwhile, the Winx Club has collected all three gems of Sirenix, but they had to find the Source of Sirenix to complete the quest; they successfully find the source at the bottom of Lake Roccaluce and obtain the Sirenix power, and they enter the Infinite Ocean. Omnia, the Supreme Guardian of Sirenix, tells them they each get a wish but after they have pleased destiny. Tritannus has all of the Selkies' powers, and together with the Trix, he enters the Infinite Ocean as well with Daphne still his captive.
118	14	"Il trono dell'imperatore" "The Emperor's Throne"	8 April 2013	17 February 2013
The Winx find an island composed completely out of trash, which Tritannus uses to refuel in toxins. The Winx arrive and stop the Trix, causing them and Tritannus to retreat. After following Tritannus and the Trix into the Infinite Ocean, Aisha is heartbroken to find the royal family of Andros' underwater kingdom mutated into demon sea monsters.
119	15	"Il pilastro della luce" "The Pillar of Light"	9 April 2013	24 February 2013
Tritannus plans to activate the Emperor's Throne; the Winx must restore order when Tritannus takes the seal from the Pillar of Light. The whole of Magix is plunged into darkness. Solaria is the most affected, especially King Radius who gets sick because of his connection to the sun. The Winx Club goes to the Infinite Ocean to restore the Pillar of Light. Stella succeeds in gaining her Sirenix spell, The Light of Sirenix, which sends Tritannus' mutants packing. Bloom attacks Icy, which causes Tritannus to get angry and attack Bloom and Aisha.
120	16	"L'eclisse" "The Eclipse"	10 April 2013	3 March 2013
Tritannus escapes with the seal while the Winx converge to save the Pillar of Light. On Solaria, Queen Luna takes care of King Radius. Aisha breaks Tritannus' spell and turns Nereus and Tressa back to their normal selves. Meanwhile at Eraklyon Sky is being called by King Erendor for his royal duty, so they get Diaspro to get him and become the kings special liaison which is a bad idea because she's a psychopath. Faragonda gathers everybody into her office and tells everyone they need to prepare the Winx Club to fully master their Sirenix powers to defeat Tritannus. During Bloom and Sky's nature walk, Diaspro ruins it because he's being called back to Eraklyon.
121	17	"L'occhio che ispira le fate" "Faraway Reflections"	11 April 2013	10 March 2013
Daphne urges the Winx to look for the eye of inspiration, but they don't know what it is or where to find it. On Earth, Tritannus turns the garbage island into a ravaging monster that causes panic in Gardenia. The Winx Club need to stop this catastrophe before it is too late.
122	18	"Il divoratore" "The Devourer"	12 April 2013	17 March 2013
Tritannus takes control of a dangerous fish called the Devourer and orders it to devour all of the Selkies in the Infinite Ocean. Flora, Tecna, and Musa must then try to find its weakness point. On the world Domino, a royal council meeting is held on what action must be taken about Tritannus. But it seems that all of the kingdoms have different ideas and different points of views.
123	19	"Le balene del canto" "The Singing Whales"	15 April 2013	31 March 2013
Tritannus takes the Seal from the Pillar of Balance, causing everything in all of the worlds to become dangerously unstable, and shake up and fall apart as the result of Tritannus tampering with the second Pillar. Musa's home world's singing whales that keep Melody in balance suddenly disappear. And the Winx Club must fight both Icy and Tritannus as Darcy and Stormy are missing.
124	20	"Problemi sentimentali" "The Problems of Love"	16 April 2013	31 March 2013
Darcy and Stormy show up with the Singing Whales of Melody. Icy is not impressed and rather be with Tritannus. Much their dismay they send the whales after the Winx causing a horrible sound. The Winx try to attack but are stopped by Musa, who uses her Sirenix spell, the Voice of Sirenix, to free the singing whales. Then they use Sirenix convergence magic to restore the Pillar of Balance. After the Winx return to visit Melody, they go back home to Alfea. Sky wants to call Bloom but then leaves. However Diaspro calls Bloom and lies, saying she will take Sky's calls from now on. The Winx train in the aviary which leads up to saving Flora because of a mess Stella made. The episode ends with Tritannus putting the seal in the throne while Darcy and Stormy plan to make Icy come back to them no matter what it takes.
125	21	"Un appuntamento perfetto" "A Perfect Date"	17 April 2013	7 April 2013
Meanwhile, the Winx Club and the Specialists plan a real date for Tecna and Timmy in Magix City. The Winx head for the Pillar of Control before Tritannus, and Bloom is informed by Daphne that the seal of the Pillar of Control must be destroyed so Tritannus will never attain its seal to activate the Emperor's Throne. The Winx go to the Infinite Ocean, but are attacked by a giant electric eel. Realizing they need Tecna's aid, Musa contacts her; and Tecna goes to help her best friends. Using Aura of Sirenix, Tecna defeats the giant eel. Tecna later returns to Timmy and they share a moment together and come to realise that it is indeed nice to spend time together.
126	22	"Ascolta il tuo cuore" "Listen to Your Heart"	18 April 2013	5 May 2013
The Winx play a volleyball game then Krystal wins and Winx lose. Tecna then gets a message from the king of Zenith that they will not join the alliance and the Winx head to Zenith to sort out the matter. Tritannus finds out what the Winx did with the seal and gets very angry and he attacks the pillar causing all technology to run out of control. The Winx transform to stop the problem from getting worse. After an intense battle Flora uses what she learns to stop the attack and Tecna convinces the king to support the alliance. She earns her wish, she asks her guardian to connect the people of her realm to Magix. Later Sky and Bloom get back together after Sky finds a way out of Diaspro's sight and the two make up. Later in the ocean at the throne, the villains try decide what to do now that the seal is gone and Daphne is forced to tell them everything about the Emperor's Throne. She mentions how the three Ancient Witches had cursed Politea, another Sirenix fairy. Icy plans to steal her powerful Sirenix abilities; and so do Darcy and Stormy.
127	23	"Sulle tracce di Politea" "The Shark's Eye"	19 April 2013	12 May 2013
Bloom learns the story of Daphne and Politea and how they were cursed by the Ancestral Witches. To protect her friends from the Sirenix curse, Bloom and Serena go on a mission to find the Shark's Head, where Politea lives. However, they and Icy fall behind when Darcy and Stormy drain Politea of her Sirenix powers. Meanwhile, Stella tries to bring her parents together, and express how she feels when they fight. She also invites them to her fashion show, where she also gains her Sirenix wish. Stella wishes for her parents to listen to each other and to their daughter as well.
128	24	"Il respiro dell'oceano" "Saving Paradise Bay"	22 April 2013	8 September 2013
Tritannus leaves an acid rain in the beautiful waters of Paradise Bay, where dolphins swim free. To prevent an environmental disaster, the Winx must find the Breath of the Ocean. The Winx are attacked by big insects, and Flora finds the Breath of The Ocean. Tritannus and Icy are attacked by the Specialists and their allies and try to escape, but are confronted by the Winx. They escape and Flora uses her special ability, the Flower of Sirenix, with the Breath of the Ocean, and restores Paradise Bay. She earns her Sirenix wish and wishes that the people of Earth would care for the planet more. Meanwhile everyone decides on the alliance and joins in the fight while Diaspro is not happy about it and gets mad and gets kicked to the pool for good, causing everyone to laugh.
129	25	"Scontro epico" "Battle for the Infinite Ocean"	23 April 2013	15 September 2013
Helia and Flora are still on the rocks, with Flora mad at him for his actions. After a ballet they make up. A call from Aisha's cousins leads to a battle between Bloom and Tritannus, and Selkies versus mutants at the Pillar of Light with Aisha caught in the crossfire: the Fairy of Waves loses her Sirenix energy to Tritannus, who intends to use them to fully activate the Emperor's Throne.
130	26	"La fine dell'incubo" "The End of Tritannus"	24 April 2013	22 September 2013
After finally managing to activate the Emperor's throne, Tritannus is losing control of his powers and himself, and even turns against Icy. One final showdown takes place between the Winx Club and Nereus to save the magical universe. In the end, Tritannus is defeated by Bloom (using Fire of Sirenix on his trident) and Nereus and banished to Oblivion for his actions. Bloom then made her Sirenix wish to break the Sirenix curse forever, thus restoring her big sister Daphne's physical body after so many years as a ghostly spirit. Note: The events of this season and episode are followed by The Mystery of the Abyss movie.
