= Winx Club season 3 =

Winx Club
- Season 3
- Italian DVD cover (left) and artwork from the 2011 re-release (right)
- No. of episodes: 26

Release
- Original network: Rai Due
- Original release: 29 January – 28 March 2007

Season chronology
- ← Previous; Season 2 Next → Season 4

The third season of the animated series Winx Club, which aired in Italy from 29 January to 28 March 2007, consisting of 26 episodes. The series was created by Iginio Straffi, founder of the Rainbow animation studio.

Before the original Italian broadcast, the series had already begun airing in the United States as a world premiere for the first seven episodes, from September 30 to November 25, 2006, within the 4Kids TV strand on Fox. However, the episodes were dubbed using unfinished copies, as the series was still in production in Italy. After the broadcast of another ten episodes, from February 24 to April 28, 2007, the airing was once again put on hold and later resumed until the conclusion of the season, from July 28 to September 22, 2007.

The season focuses on the Winx Club's third and final year at the Alfea College for Fairies, where they strive to earn an enhancement to their powers called Enchantix. The Trix escape from their prison in the Omega Dimension and bring back a new villain named Valtor, who has a special connection with Bloom.

In 2011, the American company Viacom became a co-owner of the Rainbow studio, and Viacom's Nickelodeon began producing a Winx Club revival series. Before airing the Nick-produced episodes, Nickelodeon U.S. broadcast the third season under the title, Winx Club: Enchantix, from 14 November to 26 December 2011. The Nickelodeon version was re-recorded with the new voice cast from Hollywood.

== Overview ==
The Winx Club begin their third and final year at Alfea. As fairies, the six best friends learn of their full-fledged fairy form, Enchantix, that can only be achieved when a fairy rescues someone from his or her own home planet and shows great courage, bravery, self-sacrifice, and compassion in doing so. The season focuses mainly on Bloom discovering the truth and whereabouts of her birth parents -- King Oritel and Queen Marion.

In the Omega Dimension, the Trix find and release a powerful and vengeful wizard named Valtor, who has a tragic connection to Bloom, as he was directly involved in the destruction of Bloom's home world, Domino, seventeen years ago alongside the three Ancient Witches. They choose to forge an alliance and plan to invade several areas in the realm of Magix and seek vengeance on those who imprisoned them by stealing their exceptionally strong, magical and mystical treasures and immeasurable power sources of each realm.

With their newly strong Enchantix powers, Flora, Stella, Aisha, Tecna, and Musa are able to use strong, incredible power and can miniaturize themselves at will. Bloom, however, cannot miniaturize herself due to the fact that her Enchantix is not complete.

== Episodes ==
No. overall	No. in season	Italian title / Cinélume English title 4Kids English title / Nickelodeon English title	Italian air date	American air dates (4Kids / Nick)
53	1	"Il ballo della principessa" / "The Princess' Ball" "The Princess Ball" / "The Perfect Dress"	29 January 2007	30 September 2006 (4Kids); 14 November 2011 (Nickelodeon)
Stella's father, King Radius is throwing a princess ball for her, and he promises her a special surprise. The Trix awaken Valtor and try to escape from the Omega Dimension. Aisha must return to her realm urgently. Meanwhile, Stella and another girl, Chimera, are fighting over a dress for her princess ball.
54	2	"Il marchio di Valtor" / "Valtor's Mark" "Beauty is a Beast" / "Valtor's Plan"	31 January 2007	7 October 2006 (4Kids); 15 November 2011 (Nickelodeon)
At the party, Stella's special surprise turns out to be more of a shock, as King Radius has announced his engagement to Countess Cassandra. Chimera also casts a spell on Stella, turning her into a monster.
55	3	"La principessa e la bestia" / "The Fairy and the Beast" "Pretty Pretty Princess" / "The Monster's Escape"	2 February 2007	28 October 2006 (4Kids); 16 November 2011 (Nickelodeon)
The Winx help Stella escape Solaria and seek help to break the spell cast upon her.
56	4	"Lo specchio della verità" / "The Mirror of Truth" "Mirror of Truth" / "Stella's Truth"	5 February 2007	4 November 2006 (4Kids); 17 November 2011 (Nickelodeon)
The Winx Club arrive at the ice caves in search of the mirror of truth. Aisha hesitantly explains her feelings about Valtor's arrival at her home planet. Stella turns back to herself. The Winx learn about earning their Enchantix, in which fairies can earn it from pure sacrifice for their people. Only Bloom doubts she will get her new power because there's no one left of her realm.
57	5	"Il Mare della Paura" / "The Sea of Fear" "Mission to Tides" / "Andros in Danger"	7 February 2007	11 November 2006 (4Kids); 18 November 2011 (Nickelodeon)
The Winx team up to save Aisha's home, Andros, while Stella stays at Alfea to cover them for sneaking out of the school. Meanwhile, Aisha loses her sight when Valtor casts a dark spell on her.
58	6	"La scelta di Aisha" / "Aisha's Choice" "The Mermaid Queen" / "Aisha's Courage"	9 February 2007	18 November 2006 (4Kids); 28 November 2011 (Nickelodeon)
Aisha, Bloom, Musa, Tecna and Flora proceed to the underwater city of mermaids to aid in a rescue of its queen, while Stella receives news of her place in the new royal hierarchy. Aisha is offered a chance to heal her blindness, but forgoes it to heal the dying Mermaid Queen, earning her Enchantix as a reward. However, she is still blind.
59	7	"La compagnia della luce" / "The Company of the Light" "Royal Behavior" / "Heroes of the Past"	12 February 2007	25 November 2006 (4Kids); 29 November 2011 (Nickelodeon)
The five members of the Winx Club return to Alfea where they are promptly punished for their excursion having to clean up the library, while Valtor continues his conquest to recoup his power. Meanwhile, the girls discover the tremendously strong healing effects of the Enchantix fairy dust, with which Aisha uses to cure her blindness. Faragonda tells Bloom that she and Bloom's birth parents were part of the Company of Light and fought Valtor and his guardians, the Ancestral Witches, but they have since disappeared; since Valtor was the last one to see her parents, Bloom is convinced he knows where they are.
60	8	"Una sleale avversaria" / "A Disloyal Adversary" "Dark Sky" / "Diaspro's Deception"	14 February 2007	24 February 2007 (4Kids); 30 November 2011 (Nickelodeon)
During a party on Sky's home planet, Princess Diaspro, aided by Valtor, launches her plan to gain the affections of Prince Sky. While doing this, she damages Bloom's feelings as he states that he is Diaspro's boyfriend. During their attempt to escape from Eraklyon, Stella earns her Enchantix after saving her dad from a dragon's attack.
61	9	"Il cuore e la spada" / "The Heart and The Sword" "Operation Boyfriend Rescue" / "Breaking the Mark"	16 February 2007	3 March 2007 (4Kids); 1 December 2011 (Nickelodeon)
The Winx and Brandon and Riven devise a plan to figure out Sky's erratic behavior and go to Eraklyon. In the end, Stella breaks the spell on Sky. The girls have to leave without knowing it worked, but Brandon is arrested.
62	10	"Alfea sotto assedio" / "Alfea Under Siege" "Attack of the Zombie Witches" / "Taking Over Cloudtower"	19 February 2007	10 March 2007 (4Kids); 2 December 2011 (Nickelodeon)
Valtor conquers Cloud Tower, brings the student witches under his control, and forces them to attack Alfea after he imprisons Professor Griffin. All the fairies, including Mirta, fight the witches while Valtor goes into battle with Miss Faragonda. Meanwhile, Musa earns her Enchantix after trying to save Princess Galatea from a fire started by Darcy in the Alfea library. She then uses her fairy dust's healing abilities to restore Galatea's fairy wings.
63	11	"Trappola per fate" / "A Trap for Fairies" "Missing in Action" / "Facing the Enemy"	21 February 2007	17 March 2007 (4Kids); 5 December 2011 (Nickelodeon)
While the Winx Club conduct a search for Ms. Faragonda, they encounter Mirta returning to Cloud Tower concerned about her friend Lucy. Valtor uses the intrusion to fight the Winx.
64	12	"Le lacrime del salice nero" / "The Black Willow's Tears" "Tears From the Black Willow" / "A Journey to Lynphea"	23 February 2007	24 March 2007 (4Kids); 6 December 2011 (Nickelodeon)
The Winx go to Flora's home planet, Linphea, seeking guidance in breaking the spell cast on Ms. Faragonda. Flora's little sister, Miele, tags along. Flora earns her Enchantix after saving her little sister Miele from the poisoned tears of the Black Willow and dumps the Trix (who are sent to stop them from gathering the tears) into the Black Willow's tears where they turn into little girls.
65	13	"Un ultimo battito d'ali" / "One Last Fluttering of Wings" "Point of No Return" / "Tecna's Sacrifice"	26 February 2007	31 March 2007 (4Kids); 7 December 2011 (Nickelodeon)
Valtor's conquest over Aisha's home world threatens to destroy both the planet Andros and the Omega Dimension. The Winx must stop the destruction and the escaped prisoners from the Omega Dimension, and one of them will ultimately have to make a supreme sacrifice to do it. Volunteering to close the portal herself, Tecna earns her Enchantix in the process, but is seemingly lost forever in the Omega portal.
66	14	"Furia!" / "Fury!" "Payback" / "Revenge!"	28 February 2007	7 April 2007 (4Kids); 8 December 2011 (Nickelodeon)
Heartbroken at the loss of Tecna, the five Winx girls go to confront Valtor at Cloudtower. Bloom learns the fate of her real parents, that they have disappeared in the fight against the Ancestral Witches and were presumably killed in the process. In the end, Sky returns with Brandon, saying Diaspro has been banished for her crime, while Bloom departs for Pyros, the Island of Dragons, to train herself to become strong enough to fight Valtor.
67	15	"L'isola dei draghi" / "The Island of Dragons" "The Island of Dragons" / "Dragon Quest"	2 March 2007	14 April 2007 (4Kids); 9 December 2011 (Nickelodeon)
Bloom arrives on Pyros, an island inhabited by dragons, where she is instantly attacked and becomes stranded. Daphne guides Bloom, and she meets a small dragon who is friendly and teaches her how to be a dragon. Meanwhile, back at Red Fountain, Timmy dedicates all his time into finding Tecna in the Omega Dimension through his computers.
68	16	"Dalle ceneri" / "From the Ashes" "The Power Within" / "Building Hope"	5 March 2007	21 April 2007 (4Kids); 12 December 2011 (Nickelodeon)
Bloom continues her exploration of Pyros and encounters a sorceress named Maya, who offers to train Bloom and help her become much stronger. Meanwhile, the Winx Club and the Specialists arrive at Tecna's approximate location in the Omega Dimension. Back on Pyros, Bloom must battle the Trix by herself, but by believing in herself and refusing to give in to Valtor, she gains a stronger connection to the Dragon Fire and earns her incomplete Enchantix, and goes back to Alfea.
69	17	"Nella tana del serpente" / "In the Snake's Lair" "The Omega Mission"	7 March 2007	28 April 2007 (4Kids); 13 December 2011 (Nickelodeon)
Bloom and Sky reconcile, and go to rescue Tecna. After falling off a ledge, Bloom and Tecna find the other Winx girls, who are trapped by an ice snake. With their help, they manage to escape with the Specialists. The Winx Club and the Specialists return to Alfea, where the girls celebrate their reunion at a slumber party.
70	18	"Lo scrigno di Valtor" / "Valtor's Box" "Day at the Museum" / "The Museum of Magic"	9 March 2007	28 July 2007 (4Kids); 14 December 2011 (Nickelodeon)
While training, Bloom faints and discovers her Enchantix is dangerously incomplete because she never saved anyone from her world but from sheer willpower. Valtor announces his plan to steal a relic that is associated with the destruction of Domino but it's really in the box that holds the hour glass. So the Winx go to the Magix Museum to gain the object that can hold unstable power. Ophir (Nabu), who is interested in Aisha because she is his betrothed, aids the Winx in defending the museum. However, his inference causes the loss of the object and they suspect he is a spy for Valtor.
71	19	"All'ultimo minuto" / "At the Last Moment" "Biker Chick Wedding Crashers" / "Back to Solaria"	12 March 2007	4 August 2007 (4Kids); 15 December 2011 (Nickelodeon)
Countess Cassandra announces plans to marry Stella's dad, King Radius, prompting Stella and the Winx to crash the wedding. The Specialists help them ride their bikes so they can act like a bike gang, due to the tight security. In the end, Stella reverses the effects of Cassandra's magic on her dad, using her Fairy Dust. Cassandra and Chimera are arrested, and Solaria is restored to its former glory.
72	20	"La carica delle Pixie" / "The Pixies' Charge" "Little Big Shots" / "The Pixies Fight Back"	14 March 2007	11 August 2007 (4Kids); 16 December 2011 (Nickelodeon)
While the Winx Club are away on a mission, their Pixies defend their village from Icy, Darcy, and Stormy, winning in the end.
73	21	"La torre rossa" / "The Red Tower" "The Golden Kingdom" / "Beyond the Magic Dimension"	16 March 2007	18 August 2007 (4Kids); 19 December 2011 (Nickelodeon)
The Winx proceed with a plan to negate and ultimately defeat Valtor by going to the Golden Kingdom. Ophir becomes a stowaway on their mission. They are attacked by pegagaurds and are left unconscious.
74	22	"Il labirinto di cristallo" / "The Crystal Labyrinth" "The Crystal Labyrinth" / "Finding Your Way"	19 March 2007	25 August 2007 (4Kids); 20 December 2011 (Nickelodeon)
In order to obtain the Water Stars that can defeat Valtor, Stella, Tecna, and Musa must find their way through a maze with obstacles testing their commitment to possess the Water Stars.
75	23	"La sfida dei maghi" / "The Wizards' Challenge" "The Wizard's Challenge" / "The Water Stars"	21 March 2007	1 September 2007 (4Kids); 21 December 2011 (Nickelodeon)
Valtor challenges Faragonda, Saladin and Griffin of the three schools to a duel. The Winx determine the duel a diversion to occupy the headmasters while the real Valtor breaks into Alfea. While fighting, Valtor claims he absorbed the spirits of Bloom's parents and killing him will kill them along with him. Afterward, Aisha discovers Ophir is her fiancé Nabu, and her parents agree to call off the arranged marriage.
76	24	"La rivelazione delle streghe" / "Witches' Revelation" "The Witches' Crypt" / "Seeking the Truth"	23 March 2007	8 September 2007 (4Kids); 22 December 2011 (Nickelodeon)
The Winx Club go to find the missing Cloud Tower crypts to contact the three Ancestral Witches who destroyed Domino. While there, Bloom learns from the Ancestral Witches that Valtor lied and her birth parents are alive, exiled somewhere in an unknown dimension even they don't know about. Meanwhile, Valtor endows the Trix with Disenchantix abilities, which the Winx destroy with combined Fairy Dust.
77	25	"L'ira dello stregone" / "Wizard's Anger" "The Spell of the Elements" / "Valtor's Fury"	26 March 2007	15 September 2007 (4Kids); 23 December 2011 (Nickelodeon)
Valtor turns into a demon and releases the spell of the elements, fire, water, wind, and earth, to conquer Alfea, Red Fountain, Cloud Tower and Magix. The Winx are determined to stop him once and for all. In the end, everyone except Bloom thinks that Valtor is gone for good.
78	26	"Un nuovo inizio" / "A New Beginning" "Fire and Flame" / "The Final Battle"	28 March 2007	22 September 2007 (4Kids); 26 December 2011 (Nickelodeon)
Valtor survives the attack and lures the Winx into a trap by kidnapping their boyfriends. Bloom is determined to rescue Sky and stop Valtor for good. At the end of the battle against Valtor, Headmistress Faragonda informs Bloom that her Enchantix powers are still incomplete, but she is now ready to find her birth parents at last. Note: This episode is followed by The Secret of the Lost Kingdom.
