= Winx Club: The Magic Is Back =

2025 animated reboot of Winx Club

- Genre: Action; Adventure; Comedy; Fantasy; Magical girl
- Created by: Iginio Straffi
- Based on: Winx Club by Iginio Straffi
- Voices of: Letizia Ciampa; Perla Liberatori; Ilaria Latini; Laura Lenghi; Gemma Donati; Domitilla D'Amico
- Country of origin: Italy
- Original language: English
- No. of seasons: 1
- No. of episodes: 26

Production
- Executive producer: Iginio Straffi
- Production companies: Rainbow; Rai Kids; Netflix

Original release
- Network: Netflix (international); Rai 2 Rai Yoyo
- Release: October 2, 2025

Related
- Winx Club PopPixie World of Winx Fate: The Winx Saga

Winx Club: The Magic Is Back is an Italian animated fantasy television series created by Iginio Straffi and produced by Rainbow, Rai Kids and Netflix. A reboot of the 2004 series Winx Club, the series is set in a magical universe and tells the story of Bloom, a teenage girl from planet Earth who discovers she is a fairy. Enrolling at Alfea College, she befriends five other fairies and forms a group called the Winx Club, fighting a long series of enemies threatening the Magic Dimension.

Iginio Straffi officially announced the reboot in November 2022. In January 2023, Paramount (the owner of Nickelodeon) sold its ownership stake in Rainbow back to Straffi, allowing him full creative control of the reboot.

Before its debut in Italy, the series was first shown in the United Kingdom on 8 September 2025 on BBC iPlayer and CBBC. It later premiered on 2 October 2025 on Netflix in the United States and other selected international territories.

== Premise ==
Set in the dimension of Magix, the series follows Bloom, a 16-year-old girl from Earth who discovers her fairy powers, gets saved from a scary, magical creature by Stella, a 17 year old Fairy of the Sun and Moon / Princess of Solaria and Flora, a 16 year old Fairy of Nature and enrolls in Alfea, a boarding school for fairies and witches with Stella and Flora. She befriends 3 other fairies such as Aisha, a 16 year old Fairy of Waves / Princess of Andros, Musa, a 16 year old Fairy of Music and Tecna, a 15 year old Fairy of Technology, ultimately forming the Winx Club to combat dark magical forces while exploring themes of friendship, identity, and empowerment.

== Production ==
On November 6, 2022, Iginio Straffi announced that "a brand new CG Winx animated series reboot is going into production" at the Rainbow studio. In January 2023, Paramount (the owner of Nickelodeon) sold its ownership stake in Rainbow back to Straffi, allowing him full creative control of the reboot/remake.

The project began development as a ninth season soft reboot under the title Winx Club Shorts in as early as 2021, but it was later expanded into a full-length reboot. Originally slated for a 2024 release, it was delayed until September 2025, with the first 13 episodes, and the second half of the season consisting of two parts, 6 episodes premiering in July 2026, and the remaining 7 episodes in Fall 2026. The first official preview debuted at Napoli Comicon 2024.

Rainbow describes the reboot as a "modern fantasy saga" using CGI animation across 26 episodes (~24 minutes each), blending return to original tone with contemporary themes. Based on behind-the-scenes footage, the series appears to primarily utilize Unreal Engine for its production.

The first official trailer premiered on July 19, 2025. The original Italian voice cast reprised their roles for the Italian dub.

The second part of the first season, which consists of the following six episodes, premiered on July 28, 2026, on Netflix.

The third and final part of the first season, which consists of the last seven episodes, will premiere on Netflix on November 5. It premiered on BBC iPlayer and CBBC on August 24, 2026.

== Broadcast ==
- Italy: Rai 2 (on-demand on Rai Play) on 1 October 2025; Rai Yoyo on 27 October 2025
- United Kingdom: CBBC (on-demand on BBC iPlayer) on 8 September 2025
- United States/International: Netflix (excluding UK territories) on 2 October 2025

== Voice cast ==
Character	Italian	English
Bloom	Letizia Ciampa	Kate Bristol (speaking), Elisa Rosselli (singing)
Stella	Perla Liberatori	Courtney Shaw
Flora	Ilaria Latini	Sònia Victoria Werner
Aisha	Laura Lenghi	Zuri Washington
Musa	Gemma Donati	Jenny W. Chan (speaking), Elisa Rosselli (singing)
Tecna, Darcy	Domitilla D'Amico & Federica De Bortoli	Sarah Faye Beard
Icy	Tatiana Dessi	Cat Protano
Stormy	Valeria Vidali	Caroline Spinola
Sky	Alessandro Quarta	Allen Winter
Brandon	Gianluca Crisafi	Nicholas Corda
Riven, Cafe Server	Mirko Mazzanti	James Brown Jr.
Timmy	Stefano Broccoletti	Barrett Leddy
Robin	Arianna Craviotto	Erica Lorenzetti
Damien	Luca Appetiti	Jamie McGonnigal
Vexius, King Radius, Saladin, Princess Ball Announcer, King Oritel	Andrea Lavagnino	Marc Thompson
Faragonda	Giò Giò Rapattoni	Gabi Horton
Griffin	Antonella Giannini	Sheryl Collins
Griselda, Barbatea, Queen Marion, RX3.59	Monica Vulcano, Daniela Abbruzzese	Erica Schroeder
Wizgiz	Stefano Onofri	Oliver Wyman
Diaspro	Katia Sorrentino	Brittany Lauda
Mitzi, Daphne, Genetic Fairy, Girl (2), Passersby Woman	Arianna Craviotto, Connie Bismuto	Dana Bixler
Mike Peters, Guitar Shop Owner	Roberto Certomà	Tom Wayland
Vanessa Peters	Barbara De Bortoli	Emily Cramer
Palladium	TBA	Christopher Tester
Codatorta	TBA	Major Attaway & Mike Smith

The voice recordings were made at the New York-based 3Beep Studio. The voice director was Tom Wayland.

== Music ==
The opening theme of the series, "Under the Sign of Winx", is performed by Clara Soccini and features a remix by Dav and Vvenice. It was released digitally on 8 September 2025.

The transformation theme, "Forever Winx", was performed by Virginia Bocelli and released digitally on 2 May 2025.

The ending theme of the series, "From Now On", is performed by Virginia Bocelli.

Other songs featured in the series include a mix of original tracks by Clara Soccini, Virginia Bocelli, Emily Middlemas and Elisa Rosselli, the singing voices of Bloom and Musa. The following table summarizes the songs, performers, composers, lyricists, and relevant notes:

Song	Singer	Composer(s)	Lyricist(s)	Notes
"Under the Sign of Winx"	Clara Soccini	Angela Poggi, Giovanni Cera	Yasemin Sannino	Remix by Dav, Vvenice; opening theme
"From Now On"	Virginia Bocelli	Joshua Kissiah Cumbee, Jordan Powers	Joshua Kissiah Cumbee, Jordan Powers, Virginia Bocelli	Ending theme
"Step Into the Dark"	Emily Middlemas	Stefano Della Casa	Emily Middlemas	– Bloom's transformation into her darker Winx/Fairy self, and later a revised one for the Trix's new and greater witch magic.
"Forever Winx"	Virginia Bocelli	Stefano Della Casa	Ryan Lawrie, Stefano Della Casa, Virginia Bocelli	Transformation theme into one's regular Winx/Fairy form
"Going Home"	Elisa Rosselli	Mario Parruccini, Emiliano Palmieri	Mario Parruccini, Emiliano Palmieri	–
"Super Power"	Clara Soccini	Leonardo Grilotti	Edoardo Medici, Federica Foscari	–
"Magic"	Virginia Bocelli	Stefano Della Casa	Ryan Lawrie, Virginia Bocelli, Emily Middlemas	–
"Winx of Courage"	Elisa Rosselli	Mario Parruccini, Emiliano Palmieri	Mario Parruccini, Emiliano Palmieri	– While camping out, Musa begins to sing a song she wrote on her guitar.
"Like A Butterfly"	Elisa Rosselli	Michele Bettali, Stefano Carrara, Fabrizio Castanìa, Giovanni Maria Vincenzi	Michele Bettali, Stefano Carrara, Fabrizio Castanìa, Giovanni Maria Vincenzi	– Bloom asks Icy to return the almighty Dragon Fire to her, as it is gradually destroying the Ice Witch since she is incapable of harnessing and handling its infinitely powerful cosmic fire magics fully
"Emotional"	Elisa Rosselli	Brian Joseph McKenna, Denzi Remedios, Katrine Neya Klith, Peter Wallevik	Brian Joseph McKenna, Denzi Remedios, Katrine Neya Klith, Peter Wallevik	– Stella, Flora, Aisha, Musa and Tecna give Bloom their strength in order to successfully cast the infinitely powerful ancient protection spell Pura Lux Revelio that creates a light yellow "Dome of Light" that surrounds Alfea and neutralizes Vexius' dark heart-inducing spell.
"Winx Universe"	Elisa Rosselli	Niccolò Agliardi, Edwyn Roberts, Serena Menarini, Alessandro Branca	Niccolò Agliardi, Edwyn Roberts, Serena Menarini, Alessandro Branca	–

== Merchandise ==
In June 2024, Rainbow announced a partnership with Giochi Preziosi and Playmates Toys as master licensees for a new toy line inspired by the reboot series. The toy collection will include fashion dolls, accessories, role-play items, and playsets, with Playmates handling distribution across the Americas, Asia, Australia, and more, while Giochi Preziosi covers Europe and the United Kingdom.

== Overview ==
Season	Episodes		Originally released
1	26	13	8 September 2025
1	26	6	13 July 2026
1	26	7	24 August 2026

== Episodes ==
=== Season 1 (2025-26) ===
No. overall	No. in season	Italian title English title	International release date (BBC iPlayer)	Italian air date (Rai 2)
Part 1
1	1	"Una nuova fata ad Alfea" "A New Fairy in Alfea"	8 September 2025	1 October 2025
Bloom discovers she has magical powers on her 16th birthday, after a scary encounter with a magical creature. She is rescued by Stella and Flora, from Alfea School for Fairies and Witches.
2	2	"Fata o strega?" "Which Fairy is Witch?"	8 September 2025	2 October 2025
Bloom is torn when she learns she must take a test at Alfea to determine whether she is a fairy or a witch. The Trix take advantage of her doubts, pushing her closer to despair, but with her five new friends by her side, Bloom is ready for them.
3	3	"Winx contro Trix" "Winx vs. Trix"	8 September 2025	3 October 2025
When Stella's mystical ring mysteriously disappears, the Winx embarks on a risky mission to retrieve it from Cloud Tower. As they explore the school's eerie tunnel, Bloom faces a powerful awakening.
4	4	"Trucchi de streghe" "A Trick by the Trix"	8 September 2025	6 October 2025
The Winx face their toughest physical exam yet, pushing their magic and teamwork to the limits. Meanwhile, Bloom attempts to bond with the mysterious warlock Damien.
5	5	"Shopping a Magixia" "The Shopping Trip"	8 September 2025	7 October 2025
The Winx plan a day of adventure in Magixia, but Griselda's strict restrictions and an incomplete project keep them grounded... until Robin helps them sneak away.
6	6	"Avventura nella foresta" "Into the Woods"	8 September 2025	8 October 2025
Despite Faragonda sealing their powers away, the Winx are sent on a challenging camping trip in the Dark Forest. Meanwhile, Vexius seizes the opportunity to capture Bloom's almighty Dragon Flame powers.
7	7	"Il lato oscuro di Bloom" "Dark Bloom"	8 September 2025	9 October 2025
A dark spell turns Bloom into Dark Bloom, turning her against her friends and wreaking chaos at Alfea. Meanwhile, Princess Aisha's love for dance clashes with her royal parents' expectations.
8	8	"Fate a tutto volume" "Rock and Roll Fairies"	8 September 2025	10 October 2025
Excitement builds as Musa's concert in Magixia approaches, but her nerves skyrocket when a mysterious agent shows interest, planning their next dangerous move against Bloom.
9	9	"Le paure nascoste" "The Simulation Room"	8 September 2025	13 October 2025
As the Winx prepare for an unexpected Simulation Room test, Damien struggles in the room and each girl faces their deepest fears, revealing vulnerabilities they never anticipated.
10	10	"L'appuntamento di Stella" "Stella's New Crush"	8 September 2025	14 October 2025
Bloom learns from Faragonda that she possesses the all-powerful Dragon Flame, but she fears the dangers it might bring. Meanwhile, Princess Stella is excited about a blind date with the mysterious Prince Luke.
11	11	"Un nemico inatteso" "A New Enemy"	8 September 2025	15 October 2025
When Vexius launches a devastating attack on Red Fountain, the Winx and Specialists must unite to protect the school. Meanwhile, Bloom uncovers a shocking connection between Vexius and the Dragon Flame.
12	12	"La fortezza di Roccaluce" "Lightrock Fortress"	8 September 2025	16 October 2025
With Vexius' dark power growing, Alfea prepares for a looming battle, but Bloom's sudden disappearance raises alarm. Meanwhile, Bloom learns a shocking truth about her past and her family.
13	13	"Il potere della Fiamma del Drago" "The Power of the Dragon Flame"	8 September 2025	17 October 2025
Bloom and the Winx uncover shocking truths about the Dragon Flame's origins and its connection to Damien and Vexius. Meanwhile, Bloom faces a personal revelation that will change everything.
Part 2
14	14	"Il Segreto di Bloom" "The Truth About Bloom"	13 July 2026	13 September 2026
After defeating Vexius, Bloom and the Winx return to Gardenia to her parents' house and finally discover the truth about her origins. But while Bloom, feeling lost, seeks comfort from her friends, the Trix have already sprang into action.
15	15	"Senza Poteri" "Without Power"	13 July 2026	13 September 2026
The Trix break their pact with Bloom and, having taken possession of the Dragon Flame, still hold her parents hostage. Bloom does not give up and sets out to find the Trix. A powerless Bloom joins the Winx as they come to help her save her parents.
16	16	"La Scelta di Damien" "Damien's Choice"	13 July 2026	13 September 2026
To convince Damien of Bloom's danger, Vexius hatches a plan to force her to lose control of her powers in an attempt to rescue Mike and Vanessa.
17	17	"Tecnoemozioni" "The Firewall"	13 July 2026	13 September 2026
Following an accident, Tecna's magic is short-circuited, forcing her come to terms with her emotions. The Winx and the Specialists take her to her home world of Zenith to be repaired. Tecna's magic fails as Omega creatures launch a deadly attack.
18	18	"Alfea Sotto Attacco" "Alfea Under Attack"	13 July 2026	13 September 2026
Vexius casts the Dark Heart spell on Alfea, releasing the darkest instincts of those who fall victim to it. To avoid the worst, the Winx train in conjuring an ancient magic capable of repelling evil.
19	19	"La Fata Cattiva" "The Evil Fairy"	13 July 2026	13 September 2026
While in Alfea, fairies and witches prepare for the self-defense test in the stimulation chamber, and Bloom is paired with her rival Diaspro. Tensions rise when Diaspro makes a pact with the Trix.
Part 3
20	20	"Affari di Famiglia" "Meet the Parents"	24 August 2026	13 September 2026
The dark magic of Vexius has contaminated Alfea with a lethal residue. The Winx, together with Flora's parents, are searching for a cure to save the flora and fauna of the magic kingdom.
21	21	"La Fiera di Magixia" "A Day at the Fair"	24 August 2026	13 September 2026
The Winx indulge in a day of fun at the amusement park in Magixia but are suddenly attacked by Vexius. This time, however, they may be able to stop him with the help of unexpected allies.
22	22	"Il Gran Ballo della Principessa" "The Princess Ball"	24 August 2026	13 September 2026
Stella invites the Winx in the Princess Ball on Solaria. The girls do everything they can to make the day the best day for Stella, but the Trix and Vexius crash the party.
23	23	"Guai per le Trix" "Trix in Trouble"	24 August 2026	13 September 2026
The Winx attend Palladium's special lesson against dark magic, held in the eerie ruins of Cloud Tower. The lesson takes a dangerous turn when dark energy corrupts the fairies' magic, wreaking havoc.
24	24	"Il Regno Perduto" "The World of Domino"	24 August 2026	13 September 2026
The Winx head to Domino in search of Daphne, hoping for her help. Bloom devises a plan with her to bring Damien back to the side of good, but Vexius unleashes an attack.
25	25	"Missione Omega" "Mission to Omega"	24 August 2026	13 September 2026
After the Onyx Stone explodes, the Winx find a portal to the Omega Dimension. Determined to save Saladin and Griffin, they prepare to enter - but the mission is risky!
26	26	"I Guardiani della Fiamma" "Brother and Sister"	24 August 2026	13 September 2026
After rescuing Saladin and Griffin, the Winx return from the Omega Dimension. However, Vexius, now consumed by dark magic, manages to escape. Not even the Dragon Flame seems able to stop him!

== Reception ==
Winx Club: The Magic Is Back faced criticism after reports surfaced that generative AI had been used in the series' production, including its concept art, character designs, and promotional material. An article in student newspaper The Beaver argued, "For a show that 'immortalises Y2k fashion' and integrates characters' appearances into their personality and overall story, [using AI instead of artists] comes off as insulting to long-time fans of the franchise." An article in EarlyGame highlighted job listings on Rainbow's CGI studio website, which confirm the use of AI in their productions. Both Rainbow's website and official LinkedIn page publicly announced that the company is hiring AI prompt engineering experts with "skills in designing and optimizing prompts for generative AI models (e.g., ChatGPT, Claude, Gemini)."

Starting with episode 23, the series added a note to the credits: "Selected sequences enhanced with AI-supported filters."

== See also ==
- Winx Club
