= Into the Labyrinth =

Into the Labyrinth may refer to:

In TV:

- Into the Labyrinth (TV series), a 1980s children's TV series
- "Into the Labyrinth" (Andromeda), a sci-fi TV series Andromeda's episode 31/#209

In music:

- Into the Labyrinth (Dead Can Dance album), a 1993 album by Dead Can Dance
- Into the Labyrinth (Saxon album), a 2009 album by Saxon
- "Into the Labyrinth", song by Trevor Jones from the 1986 Labyrinth soundtrack
- "Into the Labyrinth", a musical composition on Into India by Hildegard Westerkamp

In books:

- Into the Labyrinth (novel), a 1993 fantasy novel by Margaret Weis and Tracy Hickman
- Into the Labyrinth: The United States and the Middle East, 1945-1993, a 1994 history book by H. W. Brands
- Into the Labyrinth, a 2002 young adult fiction by Roderick Townley
- Into the Labyrinth, a 2017 Italian thriller novel by Donato Carrisi

In film:

- Into the Labyrinth (film), a 2019 Italian thriller film
