= List of Huntik: Secrets & Seekers episodes =

Cover of the last Huntik DVD

Huntik: Secrets & Seekers is an Italian animated television series created by Iginio Straffi, the creator of Winx Club. In Italy, the series premiered on Rai Due on 12 January 2009 at 7:25 a.m. Media Blasters released the first season on DVD in four volumes. Huntik's animation studio, Rainbow SpA, first released a trailer for the second season in July 2011. In Italy, the new season premiered on Rai Due on 17 September 2011. Rai Gulp replayed the episodes beginning on 22 September.

Following the 2011 purchase in which Viacom gained 30% ownership of Rainbow SpA, Huntik was broadcast on Viacom's Nickelodeon channels worldwide, including Nicktoons in the United States. The second season made its American premiere on Nicktoons, and the full episodes were uploaded on Nicktoons' website.

== Episode list ==
=== Series overview ===
Season	Episodes	Italian air dates		Nicktoons air dates	
Season	Episodes	First aired	Last aired	First aired	Last aired
1	26	12 January 2009	16 February 2009	6 August 2012	7 October 2012
2	26	17 September 2011	11 December 2011	21 April 2013	30 June 2013

=== Season 1 (2009) ===
No.	Title	Original release date	UK (CITV) and US (Nicktoons) airdates
1	"A Seeker Is Born" "Cercatore per caso"	12 January 2009	3 January 2009 / 6 August 2012
In the series' opener, after he discovers his father's journal and an amulet, Lok Lambert and his classmate Sophie Casterwill are chased by three strangers in suits who are after the journal. Lok bonds with the amulet and it starts a chain of events.
2	"The Casterwill Client" "La Fondazione Huntik"	13 January 2009	3 January 2009 / 7 August 2012
After Dante Vale helps Lok escape agents who are after him, Sophie catches up to them. They discover that Lok's father was looking for the Amulet of Will.
3	"Words of Truth, Heart of Lies" "Il Golem di Praga"	14 January 2009	3 January 2009 / 8 August 2012
While seeking the tomb of Jodis Lore in Prague, the gang meets the mysterious Zhalia Moon, whom Sophie distrusts despite Zhalia's attempts to help them.
4	"Into the River of Secrets" "Il fiume dei segreti"	15 January 2009	3 January 2009 / 9 August 2012
When the Huntik Foundation suspects a lost Titan is causing strange phenomena in Rouen, France, the team heads to the River Seine so Dante can investigate.
5	"Crawling the Catacombs" "Le catacombe dei Gargoyle"	16 January 2009	4 January 2009 / 13 August 2012
In Paris, the team finds notes and artifacts left by none other than Joan of Arc, and the clues guide them to hidden catacombs to find a magical ring.
6	"Divide and Conquer" "L' anello di Giovanna d'Arco"	19 January 2009	9 January 2009 / 14 August 2012
Having found the cursed ring, the team has 30 minutes to exit the catacombs and get it to a Huntik specialist before the Organization nabs it.
7	"The Legacy of Thor" "L'eredità di Thor"	20 January 2009	10 January 2009 / 15 August 2012
The team heads to the temple of Thor in search of his legendary hammer, but find it's guarded by a small sect that the Organization has infiltrated.
8	"Two Powers Become One" "Un aiuto dal passato"	21 January 2009	11 January 2009 / 16 August 2012
An Organization attack on the Huntik team yields truly unexpected results: a truce between Dante and Montahue, who partner up to find Thor's hammer.
9	"Absent Heroes" "Nella tana del basilisco"	22 January 2009	12 January 2009 / 20 August 2012
Dante heads to Vienna seeking a cure for his ill mentor, Metz. As it turns out, clues in Lok's father's journal can also be unraveled in Vienna.
10	"The Treasures of the Argonauts" "I tesori degli Argonauti"	23 January 2009	13 January 2009 / 21 August 2012
As Dante's team searches for a legendary ship belonging to Greek hero Jason, they're trailed by DeFoe's spies, who are out to eliminate Dante.
11	"The Beautiful Trap" "La trappola delle illusioni"	26 January 2009	14 January 2009 / 22 August 2012
On an ocean-bound mission to find the Argo titan, the team is forced to take a detour to a magical island that seems too good to be true.
12	"Like Father, Unlike Son" "Il destino di un cercatore"	27 January 2009	15 January 2009 / 23 August 2012
Grier's attempt to stop the civil war in his birthland leads to a conflict between him and the Huntik Foundation. Meanwhile, Lok faces the Lindorm Titan.
13	"Home Turf" "La famiglia Lambert"	28 January 2009	16 January 2009 / 27 August 2012
The gang heads to Lok's native home in Ireland to visit his mother, who they learn worked at the Huntik Foundation. A childhood friend of Lok's, Scarlet Byrne, soon shows up pursued by Organization Suits.
14	"All Work and No Pay" "Tanto lavoro per nulla"	29 January 2009	17 January 2009 / 28 August 2012
Clues the gang found in Prague are finally returned and point Lok and the team to the Tomb of Nefertiti, but the Organization cuts off all existence of Sophie Casterwill, including her funds, before they can leave for Egypt.
15	"The Sceptre Deception" "L'inganno dello scettro"	30 January 2009	18 January 2009 / 29 August 2012
At the tomb of Nefertiti, the team seeks the queen's powerful scepter, but Agents spring upon them as they try to decipher some hieroglyphics.
16	"The Bookshop Hunter" "Il tradimento"	2 February 2009	19 January 2009 / 30 August 2012
Trailing Klaus back to Vienna, the team closes in on his hideout rigged with traps. While there, Sophie begins to suspect there's a traitor among them.
17	"The Vampire Loses Its Fangs" "I tesori di Dracula"	3 February 2009	20 January 2009 / 9 September 2012
With the Organization close behind, the gang races to find the titans of Vlad Dracul -- who, they learn, was not really a vampire but an evil Seeker.
18	"Memory Lane" "Le memorie dei Casterwill"	4 February 2009	21 January 2009 / 9 September 2012
The gang returns to Paris and tracks down the Sir Lancelot titan but ends up losing it. They find clues, however, that may lead them to Lok's father.
19	"Ladies' Choice" "Il titano Leggendario"	5 February 2009	22 January 2009 / 16 September 2012
When the team heads to Turkey to find the legendary Titan Behemoth and are captured by the Amazonians, Sophie and Zhalia's Seeker powers save the day.
20	"The Unseen Guide" "Sulle tracce di Atlantide"	6 February 2009	23 January 2009 / 16 September 2012
When Sophie uses her power to fix Lok's father's journal, some long-missing information emerges that leads Lok and the team to the sunken city of Atlantis.
21	"Coming of Age" "L'amuleto della volontà"	9 February 2009	24 January 2009 / 23 September 2012
As Lok gets increasingly stronger, the Huntik team searches for the Amulet of Will and eventually finds Atlantis, where a series of tests awaits them.
22	"The Golden Asp" "L'aspide d'oro"	10 February 2009	25 January 2009 / 23 September 2012
Back home with the Amulet of Will, the Huntik team manages to translate a page of the journal and is soon headed on another mission -- to Ethiopia.
23	"To Be Together" "Un amore nobile"	11 February 2009	26 January 2009 / 30 September 2012
Seek another Titan in Ethiopia, the team must dodge the Professor as well as the Colossi and other traps. Zhalia creates a distraction to help out.
24	"The Secret of Two Generations" "Il segreto di due generazioni"	12 February 2009	27 January 2009 / 30 September 2012
While the team is in Austria with Metz, he recounts how he, Eathon Lambert and Simon Judeau searched for many titans together -- until Simon vanished.
25	"The Divine Comedy" "L'inferno di Dante"	13 February 2009	28 January 2009 / 7 October 2012
Dante's team infiltrates the Professor's castle and must navigate traps and other obstacles before getting hold of the titan Archwarder's amulet.
26	"Mission" "È nato un cercatore"	16 February 2009	29 January 2009 / 7 October 2012
When the Professor tricks Dante into giving him the titans, Lok, Sophie and Cherit must stop the Professor from summoning the titan of immortality.

=== Season 2 (2011) ===
In the United States, only the first eleven episodes of this season aired on Nicktoons, with the rest being released online.

No. overall	No. in season	Title	Original release date	UK (CITV) and US (Nicktoons) airdates
27	1	"Doorway to Huntik" "Il portale su Huntik"	17 September 2011	16 April 2012 / 21 April 2013
Lok and the team travel to the South American waterfall where Eathon was last seen and discover both a new threat and a new source of clues.
28	2	"The Tower of Nostradamus" "La torre di Nostradamus"	18 September 2011	17 April 2012 / 28 April 2013
On a mission to rescue Peter at the Tower of Nostradamus, Lok and the team learn that the ancient prophet's scrying glass is the key to the Willblade.
29	3	"Cave of the Casterwills" "La caverna dei Casterwill"	24 September 2011	18 April 2012 / 5 May 2013
Lok and the team travel to England and fight unknown Seekers to enter the Crystal Cave, where they are given clues to the location of Avalon.
30	4	"Knight of the Willblade" "Il cavaliere della Willblade"	25 September 2011	19 April 2012 / 12 May 2013
After activating the Dragon's Breath and creating a bridge to Avalon, Lok finds the Willblade and uses its Titans spirit Pendragon to fight Mr. Wilder.
31	5	"Chasing Void" "La ricerca di Void"	1 October 2011	20 April 2012 / 19 May 2013
Sophie and Lok allow themselves to be captured by Wilder so they can discover the location of Void, the mysterious evil Titan.
32	6	"The Blood Spiral" "La spirale di sangue"	2 October 2011	24 April 2012 / 26 May 2013
Lok, Sophie and the team fight Wilder and the Organization to retrieve Void from Klaus's bookstore, but they are ambushed by the Blood Spiral.
33	7	"Den vs. Harrison" "Den contro Harrison"	8 October 2011	25 April 2012 / 2 June 2013
Orphaned brothers Den and Harrison are recruited by Tantras, but Den befriends Zhalia and Vigilante, while his brother joins the Blood Spiral.
34	8	"The Legendary Titan of Fate" "Le profezie di Arc"	9 October 2011	26 April 2012 / 9 June 2013
The Huntik Foundation team tracks the Ring of Arc to catacombs under Notre Dame, where the ring casts a dreamlike spell on them.
35	9	"Zhalia's Mission" "La missione di Zhalia"	15 October 2011	27 April 2012 / 16 June 2013
Lok and the Huntik team race a Blood Spiral named Kiel to recover the Titan Medusa, a mission that nearly fails and forces Zhalia to adopt a new plan.
36	10	"Boys Will Be Seekers" "I nuovi Cercatori"	16 October 2011	1 May 2012 / 23 June 2013
Lok trains the inexperienced Den as Zhalia's replacement, while Zhalia trains with Tantras as the newest addition to the Blood Spiral.
37	11	"The Casterwill Connection" "L'alleanza dei Casterwill"	22 October 2011	2 May 2012 / 30 June 2013
The Huntik team is dispatched to the Cloisters in New York, where they must contend with a stubborn Casterwill elder and a Blood Spiral attack.
38	12	"The Titan in the Temple of Sun" "Il Tempio del Sole"	23 October 2011	3 May 2012 / Unaired
Ordered to activate the Blue Star, a signal to the remaining Casterwills, the team must solve a puzzle at the ancient Aztec capital of Teotihuacan.
39	13	"Sophie on Trial" "La prova di Sophie"	29 October 2011	4 May 2012 / Unaired
At a secret gathering of the remaining Casterwills, Sophie is assigned to find the legendary Mytrhas, Titan of Bravery, but the Blood Spiral attacks.
40	14	"The Spiral War" "La guerra della Spirale"	30 October 2011	9 May 2012 / Unaired
Sophie returns with Mythras, but the bickering Casterwills won't acknowledge her as leader, until a tragic sacrifice in battles ends the debate.
41	15	"Gremlow Infestation!" "L'infestazione dei Gremlow"	5 November 2011	10 May 2012 / Unaired
Dante tries to access the submerged treasure room of Cortez, while Sophie turns to the fable of the pied piper of Hamil to clean up an infestation.
42	16	"The Power of Umbra" "Il potere di Umbra"	6 November 2011	11 May 2012 / Unaired
With the help of two Kumeyaay Seekers, the team accesses the treasure room of Cortez in search of Umbra, the legendary Titan of Dimensions.
43	17	"Lok's Leadership" "La leadership di Lok"	12 November 2011	15 May 2012 / Unaired
At the castle of Vlad the Impaler, Lok leads his first mission to retrieve the Heart of Vlad, but it's almost his last when Tantras attacks.
44	18	"The Dead Magic Island" "La Sorgente di Anti-Magia"	13 November 2011	16 May 2012 / Unaired
Underneath a volcano island, the Huntik team descends into a labyrinth to destroy the anti-magic Loadstone and rescue Phoenix, the Titan of Rebirth.
45	19	"The Phoenix's Ashes" "Le ceneri di Phoenix"	19 November 2011	17 May 2012 / Unaired
Unable to retrieve the Phoenix Amulet from the volcano and ambushed by the Blood Spiral, the Huntik team resorts to desperate measures.
46	20	"An Ally from The Organization" "Un alleato dall'organizzazione"	20 November 2011	18 May 2012 / Unaired
A battle erupts between the Huntik team and Mr. Wilder at the Professor's castle, where Lok hopes to find an access key and retrieve Rassimov's files.
47	21	"Rassimov's Secret" "Il segreto di Rassimov"	26 November 2011	22 May 2012 / Unaired
Using the Professor's files, the Huntik team captures Rassimov, but Harrison frees him and they escape with Tutankhamun's glass necklace.
48	22	"Back Home" "Di nuovo a casa"	27 November 2011	23 May 2012 / Unaired
At the home of Lok's mother in Ireland, The team is drawn to the mythical floating city of Tir Na N-Óg where Eathon instructs Lok in Willblade combat.
49	23	"Words from Eathon" "Le parole di Eathon"	3 December 2011	24 May 2012 / Unaired
The final battle shapes up as Rassimov announces the Longest Night, and the team scrambles to unearth the last quatrain prophecy of Nostradamus.
50	24	"The Spiral Mark" "Il marchio della spirale"	4 December 2011	25 May 2012 / Unaired
The attack on the Blood Spiral base seems to go in the team's favor, until the spectral presence of the Betrayer appears and reveals his evil plan.
51	25	"Lok and the Betrayer" "Lok e il Traditore"	10 December 2011	29 May 2012 / Unaired
The Betrayer returns to life and assails the Foundation and the Casterwill, but Zhalia admits she's a spy, inspiring Harrison to join her rebellion.
52	26	"Dante's Return" "Il ritorno di Dante"	11 December 2011	30 May 2012 / Unaired
The team falthers in its battle against the powerful Titan of Betrayal, Demigorgan, but a newly empowered Lok and a resurrected teammate turn the tide.
