= Regal Academy =

Italian animated television series

- Genre: Action; Adventure; Comedy; Fantasy
- Created by: Iginio Straffi; Joanne Lee
- Written by: Sean Molyneaux; Michaek Maurer; Benjamin Lazar Platt; Joe Deasy; Merrill Hagan; Omeed Dariani
- Directed by: Iginio Straffi
- Creative director: Simone Borselli
- Composers: Michele Bettali; Stefano Carrara; Fabrizio Castanìa
- Country of origin: Italy
- Original language: Italian
- No. of seasons: 2
- No. of episodes: 52 (list of episodes)

Production
- Executive producers: Joanne Lee; Annita Romanelli
- Producer: Iginio Straffi
- Running time: 23 minutes
- Production companies: Rainbow S.p.A. (Viacom); Rai Fiction

Original release
- Network: Rai YoYo (Italy); Nickelodeon; Nick Jr.
- Release: May 22, 2016 – October 8, 2018

Regal Academy is an Italian animated series co-created by Iginio Straffi and Joanne Lee. The series was produced by the Rainbow studio, which at the time was co-owned by Straffi and Viacom. It premiered on Rai YoYo in Italy on May 22, 2016, and on Nickelodeon and Nick Jr. internationally on August 13, 2016.

The series is a comedic reimagining of a few fairy tale characters. It originated as a dark comedy concept called Twisted Fairy Tales that the Rainbow team designed in 2009. After several years of changes, the show was previewed in 2013, under the working title Royal Academy.

== Plot ==
The series follows Rose, a teenage girl from Earth who discovers a key that leads to FairyTale Land, where fairy tales come to life. She ends up at a school called Regal Academy, where students learn how to become heroes. Rose finds out that she is the granddaughter of the school's headmistress Cinderella. Rose decides to enroll at Regal Academy and learn how to use magic while having adventures with her friends, battling her archrival Vicky and her cohorts, and uncovering the mysteries of her past.

== Characters ==
=== Students ===
- Rose Cinderella (voiced by Rebecca Soler in the English version, singing by Anna Pieretto, Chiara Francese in the Italian version) is an ordinary girl from Earth who unlocks her fairytale past as the granddaughter of Cinderella. Enrolling in Regal Academy at the request of her grandmother, she befriends Astoria, Joy, Hawk and Travis after they are assigned to be in the same group for a class. Though initially disliked due to her disregard of grades, klutziness, and ditzy mannerism, the school population gradually warms up to her due to her constant optimism and kindness. Like her grandmother, she is a lover of fairytales and shoes, later coming to own a wand that utilises Pumpkin Magic to conjure objects. Rose also later comes to own a pair of signature Cinderella glass slippers, her family's magical item; she was the first one of her friends to unlock her family item. Her romantic interest is Hawk SnowWhite. She almost confessed to him in "Beauty is the Beast". Her famous quote is "Pumpkin seeds!".
- Travis Beast (voiced by Tom Wayland in the English version, singing by Stefano Carrara, Manuel Meli in the Italian version) is the grandson of the Beast. Like Rose, he lives on Earth. He specialises in art and tends has a sarcastic attitude. When he gets angry, he becomes a real beast and possess immense and uncontrollable strength. Travis later comes to own a wand that utilises Fury Magic that can create powerful tornadoes and hurricanes. His romantic interest is Ling Ling IronFan. He confessed to her in "Beauty is the Beast" when Ling Ling was turned into a monster but his love for her made him realize that it was Ling Ling. His famous quote is "Bad luck beast!". He later owns his family's magical item, the Beast Mask.
- Astoria Rapunzel (voiced by Erica Schroeder in the English version, singing by Claudia Valtinoni, Giulia Tarquini in the Italian version) is the granddaughter of Rapunzel and living up to her fairy tale, has very long wavy purple hair with a blue streak in her bang and green highlights at the ends when using her hair powers reminiscence . She is a perfectionist and a bookworm, aspiring to get perfect grades always, and is known for being the most hardworking princess at Regal Academy sometimes second to Ling Ling Ironfan. Her hair is alive, and can be used as an extra pair of hands to hold things by wrapping around them. In Season 2, her love interest is Shawn Beast. She later comes to own her family's magical item, the Fire Bangles. Her famous quote is "Oh! my grades!".
- Hawk SnowWhite (voiced by Bill Thompson in the English version, singing by Michele Bettali, Alex Polidori in the Italian version) is the grandson of Snow White and just as his grandmother was "the fairest of them all", he is likewise charming and thus highly popular among girls. Like his grandmother, he also has an uncontrollable love for apples. Hawk's exaggerated heroism can sometimes get him and his friends into uncomfortable situations. His romantic interest is Rose Cinderella. He later comes to own his family's magical item, the Mirror Shield. He is mostly heard saying "Attack!" when it's battle time but his usual quotes are "Cool as Ice!" and "Rotten apples!" when things go wrong.
- Joy LeFrog (voiced by Alyson Leigh Rosenfeld in the English version, singing by Elisa Aramonte, Emanuela Ionica in the Italian version) is the granddaughter of The Frog Prince (known as Professor LeFrog). She has a curse where she uncontrollably switches to a frog, to switch back she is often kissed by Hawk and Travis. In both her forms, Joy loves all types of insects. Her romantic interest is Esquire Frog. She later comes to own her family's magical item, the Frog Ball. Her famous quote is "Oh my frogs!".
- Ling Ling IronFan (voiced by Kate Bristol in the English version, singing by Federica Olari, Elena Perino in the Italian version) is a transfer student from an academy in China. Having grown up trained to be a perfect warrior and an outstanding student, she is completely clueless about fashion, dance, romance and other typical high school group activities. She joined Rose's team after her team was captured by the Snow Queen. Her romantic interest is Travis Beast who she gets feelings for after several incidents like him saving her from a transformation. She later comes to own her family's magical item, the Moon Bow.
- Esquire Frog is Joy's love interest from Frog Academy. At first, Joy is nervous to talk to him, but she eventually gets the chance to kiss him to turn him human which he gets upset over and dislike her but when joy becomes a frog he becomes infatuated and wants to kiss her which Joy now rejects. In the second season, it is revealed he has an evil rival named Von Frogg. When Esquire was young, he was placed under a curse that turned him into a frog, and he prefers living as a frog to a human.
- Shawn Beast is Travis' cousin introduced in season 2. He is Astoria's childhood friend and they appear to have feelings for one another. Astoria rejects him as a dance partner when they are on competing teams, so he partners with Alicia instead.
- Gerald Ugly Duckling is the grandson of the Ugly Duckling. He is shy and has a self-esteem problem. He is interested in Odette Swan as shown in Season 2 Episode 11.
- Finn Whale is the grandson of the whale from the story of Sinbad. He is slow and clumsy.
- Leena Tom Thumb is the granddaughter of Tom Thumb. She is very tiny and often ends up "squished" flat.
- Odette Swan (voiced by Lin Gothoni) is the granddaughter of the Swan Princess from the tale of Swan Lake. She can dance very well. She is interested in Gerald Ugly Duckling as shown in Season 2 Episode 11.
- Pinocchia is the granddaughter of Pinocchio. She is a friendly, smiling living doll who distrusts anyone who lies.
- Violet Ogre is the granddaughter of an ogre. She has green skin and is very tall.

=== Villains ===
- Vicky Broomstick (voiced by Laurie Hymes in the English version, Eleonora Reti in the Italian version) is a student and Rose's archrival, who carries on evil plans and wishes to be the ultimate fairy tale villain. However, her plans are always thwarted by Rose and her friends, thus her goal is to get Rose expelled from Regal Academy. Despite the students being aware of Vicky's schemes, the staff never catch on and treat her as the top of the class.
- Cyrus Broomstick (voiced by Michael Henning in the English version, Emanuele Ruzza in the Italian version) is the cousin and friend to Vicky. He is lazy and likes to nap a lot, even during class. Because of his laziness, he is usually coerced into helping with Vicky's schemes.
- Ruby Stepsister (voiced by Brittney Hamilton in the English version, Joy Saltarelli in the Italian version) is a student who is friends with Vicky and usually helps her out with her evil plans (by mostly doing the bulk of the work). She has a crush on Hawk which is another reason she helps Vicky. Ruby's power allows her to tidy up things. By the end of Season 1, Ruby is expelled.
- Kira Snow Queen is the daughter of the Snow Queen and only introduced in season 2. Tasked by her mother to infiltrate the student body by posing as the daughter of Jack Frost, she teams up with Vicky and Cyrus after they find her out. She primarily uses crystal magic that can surpass Hawk's snow magic. She replaces Ruby as part of Vicky's gang after Ruby gets expelled.

=== Staff ===
- Headmistress Cinderella (voiced by Kathryn Cahill in the English version, Aurora Cancian in the Italian version) is the headmistress of Regal Academy. Having been able to hold her own against her stepmother and stepsisters, Cinderella is not afraid to speak her mind now that she's a grandmother. She likes to organize balls and dresses. Much like her granddaughter Rose, Cinderella loves shoes.
- Coach Beast (voiced by Tyler Bunch in the English version, Pierluigi Astore in the Italian version) is a brash gym teacher who yells at students to run a thousand laps or do a thousand pushups. He punishes students if they break the rules of the school. Underneath his tough exterior, Coach Beast has a heart of gold and a secret love for roses. He teaches dragon riding.
- Professor SnowWhite (voiced by Lori Gardner in the English version, Emanuela Baroni in the Italian version) is a strict teacher at Regal Academy, finding herself at odds with Rose and her friends over their adventures. She loves apples and has lots of apple treats on her desk. Snow White teaches etiquette, teamwork, and how to use magical items and powers.
- Doctor LeFrog (voiced by Marc Thompson in the English version, Gianni Giuliano in the Italian version) is the potions professor at the school. With a constant serious look in his eyes, he appears to be funny and ridiculous. Doctor LeFrog is unfazed when something goes wrong and will continue to teach the class because he is absent-minded.
- Magister Rapunzel (voiced by Kayzie Rogers in the English version, Alessandra Cassioli in the Italian version) is the poetry and literature teacher. Because she has spent so much of her time in the tower, Magister Rapunzel excitedly wants to talk and show off her books. Unfortunately she loses control of the conversation and ends up talking to statues, paintings, and even her own hair.
- Professor Wolfram is an anthropomorphic wolf who is always impeccably dressed and is well-mannered. He teaches chivalry and heroism, with his assignments turning into adventures for students. However, there is something dark going on during his assignments.
- Professor Beauty is the art professor at Regal Academy. She is very kind, often having a good word for everyone. Professor Beauty is able to see the positive even in bad, unfortunate situations. She can talk about a piece for hours and hours.
- Professor IronFan is Ling Ling's grandmother.

== Episodes ==
=== Season 1 (2016–17) ===
No.	Italian title (translation) English title	Italian airdate	American airdate
1	"La scuola delle favole"	22 May 2016	August 13, 2016
1	"A School for Fairy Tales"	22 May 2016	August 13, 2016
Rose is off on her first day of high school, but is almost late after stopping at shoe shop after shoe shop, whereupon she receives a magical key from a mouse. Bumping into a strange boy holding a similar key, she follows him to an alleyway, where he unlocks a door and jumps in. Following suit, Rose winds up at Regal Academy, a school for fairytales, and is welcomed by her grandmother Cinderella, the headmistress of the school. There, she is made to attend classes with group-mates Astoria Rapunzel, Joy LeFrog, Hawk SnowWhite and Travis Beast, the boy she bumped into earlier. Failing the start-of-year challenge due to Rose's clumsiness and excitement over meeting real-life fairytales, Astoria dislikes her at once but changes her viewpoint after receiving some encouragement. After school, Cinderella brings her granddaughter to the family castle, gifting her her own wand with pumpkin magic and promising her that she can be a Cinderella someday. As Rose prepares to return home to Earth with Travis, Cinderella tells her to keep this fairytale lineage thing a secret.
2	"La grande corsa dei draghi"	22 May 2016	August 20, 2016
2	"The Great Dragon Race"	22 May 2016	August 20, 2016
Rose ventures off to Regal Academy to pursue her new magical school. The students of Regal Academy are put to a test into compete in the dragon rider challenge. This proves much too difficult for Rose as she is unable to bond with a dragon. After her dragon is put under a sleeping spell she encounters a genie's lamp and make a wish to reunite her with her dragon.
3	"Un cigno nella palude"	22 May 2016	August 27, 2016
3	"The Swan in Swamp Lake"	22 May 2016	August 27, 2016
A boring day turns into chaos when Magister Rapunzel sends Rose's team to the swamp for a special assignment.
4	"Astoria e la pianta di fagiolo"	22 May 2016	September 3, 2016
4	"Astoria and the Beanstalk"	22 May 2016	September 3, 2016
Rose and Hawk are excited for their first day of heroism class where they are tasked with retrieving a golden egg from the giant's castle.
5	"Un matrimonio da favola"	27 May 2016	September 10, 2016
5	"Fairy Tale Wedding"	27 May 2016	September 10, 2016
During Doctor LeFrog's potion class, a bridge troll is summoned and sets out to woo pretty princesses.
6	"Mistero al castello di Cenerentola"	28 May 2016	October 8, 2016
6	"Mystery at Cinderella's Castle"	28 May 2016	October 8, 2016
When the Gate to Earth is mysteriously closed, Rose, Joy and Astoria are invited to a sleepover at Cinderella Castle.
7	"La nipote della principessa sul pisello"	17 September 2016	October 1, 2016
7	"The Pea Princess' Granddaughter"	17 September 2016	October 1, 2016
Bea, the new decorum teacher and granddaughter of the Princess and the Pea, threatens to fail everyone.
8	"La vendetta"	18 September 2016	September 24, 2016
8	"The Revenge"	18 September 2016	September 24, 2016
The group is ambushed by a vengeful dog while working on a painting for art class in Fairy Tale Town.
9	"L'attacco della strega Zenzero"	19 September 2016	October 22, 2016
9	"Attack of the Shortbread Witch"	19 September 2016	October 22, 2016
Rose's mom Clara is mad at her. The Shortbread Witch ambushes Hawk, Astoria and the others in cooking class.
10	"La collezione da favola di Rose"	20 September 2016	October 15, 2016
10	"Rose's Fairy Tale Collection"	20 September 2016	October 15, 2016
Rose is upset when Doctor LeFrog confiscates her fairy tale collection. Vicky and Shire Cat create a threatening evil potion.
11	"Il ritorno del lupo cattivo"	21 September 2016	October 29, 2016
11	"The Bad Wolf's Great Fall"	21 September 2016	October 29, 2016
Humpty Dumpty is at Regal Academy for the annual treasure hunt; during their search, Rose's team is chased by the Bad Wolf.
12	"Zucche e draghi"	22 September 2016	November 5, 2016
12	"Pumpkins and Dragons"	22 September 2016	November 5, 2016
When Regal Academy turns back into a huge pumpkin patch, Rose and her team must find a rare, colossal pumpkin to recast the spell and save the school.
13	"Il grande ballo"	23 September 2016	November 12, 2016
13	"The Grand Ball"	23 September 2016	November 12, 2016
At the Grand Ball, Joy and Rose plan to kiss Esquire Frog with special, curse-breaking lipstick; Vicky invites Candlewick to the ball.
14	"Ventaglio di ferro"	20 October 2016	January 14, 2017
14	"The Legendary Iron Fan"	20 October 2016	January 14, 2017
When Regal Academy is challenged by Ling Ling, a student from Shan Academy, Rose must find Ling Ling's weakness.
15	"Rose e il re dei draghi"	21 October 2016	January 21, 2017
15	"Rose and the Dragon King"	21 October 2016	January 21, 2017
Rose gets excited for the first day of dragon taming class, where she meets Low Ong, the king of dragons.
16	"La canzone della strega del mare"	22 October 2016	January 28, 2017
16	"Song of the Sea Witch"	22 October 2016	January 28, 2017
When the Sea Witch steals Rose's voice before she is supposed to sing in front of the school, her team fights to get her voice back in time for her debut.
17	"Hawk e le mele avvelenate"	23 October 2016	February 4, 2017
17	"Hawk and the Poisoned Apples"	23 October 2016	February 4, 2017
The Evil Queen SnowWhite's Stepmother becomes the new poisons teacher; Hawk and Rose must convince the teachers that the Evil Queen is up to no good before she can kidnap Granny Snowwhite.
18	"Favole sulla Terra"	23 October 2016	February 11, 2017
18	"Fairy Tales on Earth"	23 October 2016	February 11, 2017
The teams are sent to Earth for class where they disappear one at a time as the Shortbread Witch lures them into her bakery; Rose's team spots the witch's cookie monsters and leaps into action.
19	"La Maledizione del Capelli"	12 November 2016	February 25, 2017
19	"Hair Curse"	12 November 2016	February 25, 2017
When Astoria wakes up in the school library every day, her friends watch over her at night and find out that her own ivy-hair takes her there in her sleep.
20	"La Giornata del Genitori"	12 November 2016	March 4, 2017
20	"The Parents' Day"	12 November 2016	March 4, 2017
Professor Cinderella makes an announcement that all students at Regal Academy must invite their parents to see what they do at the academy. Rose isn't too pleased with the idea as her parents aren't keen to come. Rose's mother Clara comes to Regal Academy to save Rose from the grandson of Merlin who is named Melvin and plans to learn Pumpkin Magic and finally surpass his grandfather and be the ultimate wizard. Clara Rose's mother comes to Rose's aid to protect her from Melvin but she tries to leave Regal Academy immediately after saving her as she was responsible for making Cinderella lose the glass slipper. At the end they reunite, including Rose's father Dave, and they meet Cinderella for the first time.
21	"Magia Scimmiesca"	14 November 2016	18 March 2017
21	"Monkey Magic"	14 November 2016	18 March 2017
Professor Iron Fan is kidnapped by the Monkey King. Now Rose and her friends including Ling-Ling have to save her Grand mother from the king. The Monkey King reveals that the reason why her mom was as they were suffering from a noxious gas emitting from the volcano, and need help to solve their dilemma.
22	"Il festival dei fiori"	24 October 2016	25 March 2017
22	"Flowerpocalypse"	24 October 2016	25 March 2017
Professor Beauty invites Thumbelina to regal academy and to show the beauty of flowers including her own mother who is the Queen of Flowers, Vicky takes advantage of this by getting mischievous Flowers to do her bidding to control the Queen of Flowers. Vicky uses a voodoo doll to this and makes the Queen of Flowers to create Chaos at regal academy.
23	"Danza al Chiaro di Luna"	13 November 2016	April 8, 2017
23	"Swan Dancing with the Stars"	13 November 2016	April 8, 2017
The reward for dancing class is great and very high risk they must perform the swan ballet. When Vicky see this as a way to destroy her rivals she uses Odette's villain Rothbart to get revenge. He transforms them into swans and only a special dance done under the moon can reverse it. Can the students beat Vicky and the foul foe before everyone is turned into swans and feathers?
24	"Il Duello del Draghi"	14 November 2016	April 15, 2017
24	"The Dragon Duel"	14 November 2016	April 15, 2017
Coach Beast invites Sir George to help the students to master the arts of Dragon Duels and how to be partners with your Dragon. Vicky makes her move as she steals the Dragon Broach from the dim-witted Sir George that allows the user to control any Dragon.Meanwhile Travis wants to showcase his talent as a painter and wants to hang his art in Beasts castle but rose issues a challenge to Coach Beast that if she wins the Dragon duel monsters Travis may hang his art in his Castle. Vicky and Rose challenge each other and Vicky using the Dragon Broach she still loses the duel. At the end of the episode, Ruby is seen picking up the Dragon Broach that Vicky lost in the duel.
25	"La Caduta del Guardiani"	15 November 2016	April 22, 2017
25	"Fall of the Guardians"	15 November 2016	April 22, 2017
After Rose wins the Dragon Duel against Vicky, Ruby steals the Dragon Broach to execute a solo plan of hers, travelling to Earth to find her grandmothers The Wicked Stepsisters. However, they are still in need of the Cinderella family heirloom: the Glass Slippers, which the stepsisters lost when Rose's mother, who was in possession of the shoes at that time, went to Earth to meet her future husband (Rose's father today). Returning to Regal Academy, they create a potion with the Dragon Broach to control the gate connecting Earth and the school, but are thwarted by Rose and her friends. After a showdown, the Dragon Broach is supposedly lost in the potion, but Vicky manages to get her hands on it.
26	"La Terribile Vicky"	15 November 2016	April 29, 2017
26	"Vicky the Villain"	15 November 2016	April 29, 2017
Vicky acquires the Dragon Broach and the lost Glass Slipper from the wicked stepsisters and Ruby. With cauldron magic, she creates a potion to bring back villains in an attempt to conquer Regal Academy and start a new age of villains ruling the fairytale world. Rose and her friends fail at outsmarting them with magic, but acquire the other glass slipper instead. A confrontation lets Rose take her family heirloom back, gaining a new power as the youngest princess of the Cinderella family, allowing her to defeat all the villains and save their Guardian Dragons, whom, thanks to the Dragon Broach were being controlled by Vicky. As the teachers are freed from captive, Vicky pushes all the blame on Ruby, causing the latter to be expelled and banished together with her grandmothers.

=== Season 2 (2017–18) ===
The second season of Regal Academy was released on November 5, 2017. It has 26 episodes. In the new season, Rose and her friends return from summer holidays and ready to take on new and exciting adventures in Fairy Tale Land. With the help of new magical items and funny pumpkin creatures called the PomPoms, the heroes will undertake new missions and face a mysterious student named Kira, and her mother the evil Snow Queen who wants to trap them all in her snow globes. Regal Academy now airs on the Nick Jr. Channel.

No.	Italian title (translation) English title	Original air date	English air date
1	"PomPom!"	28 November 2017	November 5, 2017
1	"PomPoms!"	28 November 2017	November 5, 2017
To get revenge on the six great fairy tale families, the evil Snow Queen plans to trap all of them into her handmade snow globes. Locating them at Regal Academy, she enrolls her daughter Kira under a false parentage and tries to take advantage of little pumpkin-made creatures accidentally created by Rose to wreak havoc at the school. She is quickly defeated by Rose though, and the teachers strengthen security immediately. However, they are unaware of Kira's relations to the Snow Queen, when the former teams up with Cyrus and Vicky. Meanwhile, Clara, Rose's mom, becomes a fashion teacher at Regal Academy, much to Rose's delight.
2	"La bella è la bestia"	29 November 2017	November 12, 2017
2	"Beauty is the Beast"	29 November 2017	November 12, 2017
Due to a barrier of eternal spring cast by the school, the Snow Queen is unable to get in and instead uses Kira to cause trouble at Regal Academy. Enlisting the help of Vicky and Cyrus, the wicked trio cast a curse on Ling Ling, who turns into a monster that spreads terror at the school. As Travis is the only one who connects with her, he eventually manages to release her from the spell and they embrace. After the excitement dies down, Cinderella reveals new regal armour specially prepared for Rose and her friends.
3	"La fiera della magia"	30 November 2017	November 19, 2017
3	"The Magic Fair"	30 November 2017	November 19, 2017
The Magic Fair is here at Regal Academy, and the most popular booth gets the highest grade. With the arrival of Merlin, Vicky calls the Sea Witch, Shortbread Witch and the Evil Queen to help wreck some mayhem with a fake "Sword in the Stone", where the person who manages to pull the sword free will have their wildest dream come true. However, this is merely a ruse to absorb magic from anyone who touches the sword. Cyrus, Vicky and Kira then steal Merlin's sparkle magic, which is famed for being extremely powerful, and use it to manifest a fireworks dragon that almost dissolves the barrier of eternal spring around the school until Rose's pumpkin PomPoms neutralize and eat it. Rose willingly gives up her magic to save her friends and in doing so, breaks the curse. The Evil Queen is restrained and the Sea Witch and Shortbread Witch are turned into frogs and banished.
4	"Specchi impazziti"	1 December 2017	December 3, 2017
4	"Mirror Maddness"	1 December 2017	December 3, 2017
Hawk is unable to work magic mirrors properly, much to his grandmother's disappointment. Unfortunately for him and his team, the magic mirror test is scheduled that very day, and if he does not pass the test he will never get to use his family shield, a sacred item Hawk has been dreaming of wielding since he was a kid. By opening portals through magic mirrors, each team is tasked to retrieve a beautiful but dangerous item from their designated mirror to pass the test. Working together, they manage to receive a heated dragon stone from a remote volcano and escape, but forget to close the portal and let in the fiery dragons guarding the stone. Kira, having learnt a powerful curse from her mother, uses this distraction to stick it into the main magic mirror controlling the rest. The curse transports the three teachers supervising the exam, Cinderella, Snow White and Doctor LeFrog to the Snow Queen's castle, but are saved by Rose and her friends. The cursed mirrors then transport them to LeFrog Swamp, but almost all of them are frozen, except Hawk, who is torn between saving Rose and using his family shield to repel the curse. Connecting with his mirror self, which he has never done before, Hawk manages to break the curse and frees his friends. Best of all, he passes the test as how a true Snow White should have.
5	"The Giant's Wife"	2 December 2017	December 10, 2017
Grandma Rapunzel gives Astoria the Fire Bangles, but to activate them, Astoria first needs to trust them during a journey in the giant's castle.
6	"Searching for Pinocchio"	3 December 2017	December 17, 2017
Regal Academy students have to help Pinocchia find her brother Pinocchio, who has mysteriously disappeared.
7	"The Frog Villain"	4 December 2017	January 7, 2018
Doctor LeFrog sets up a school contest, but Professor Von Frogg wants to steal the Frog Ball.
8	"Into the Enchanted Forest"	5 December 2017	January 14, 2018
Sheriff Red Riding Hood arrives at Regal Academy to teach a class how the police force works, allowing Rose to learn about the story of Fala, Hawk's older sister who disappeared years ago in the Enchanted Forest. At the station, Red Riding Hood reveals her findings on how other similar cases have been occurring for the past 100 years apart from Fala's, prompting Hawk to decide to venture into the Forest to find her despite the former advising him to leave it to the police. Rose, realising that Hawk's knack for saving princesses was probably to make up for being unable to save Fala, plans a rescue mission with everyone outside the Forest tomorrow, just as Red Riding Hood decides to reform a team to scout out that very same day. As Rose uses some Sniff-n-Smell stickers to allow them to find their way back, the team battle a swarm of tree monsters, causing Rose to end up separated from the group. Encountering a former prince, he reveals how he was cursed to wander the Forest due to an evil witch named Tatauniya controlling it. Rose manages to meet up with the rest with her Glass Slippers, as well as Red Riding Hood in the process who saves them all from the tree monsters, and they discover how Tatauniya had turned all the missing people into creatures, including the tree monsters themselves. Remembering how the prince said to find the heart of the Forest, the group attempt to search using Hawk's mirror self but realise that the supposed heart is actually the prince's stolen crown, just as Tatauniya confronts them. With help from a PomPom, they retrieve the crown and return it to the Forest's prince, returning the Forest to its former state and breaking Tatauniya's magic. However, the Forest prince reveals that Tatauniya traded Fala to the Snow Queen for a curse to steal his crown. Red Riding Hood arrests Tatauniya and Hawk vows to save Fala eventually.
9	"The Masquerade Ball"	6 December 2017	January 21, 2018
Beast Castle is holding a masquerade ball in honour of Travis' cousin, Shawn Beast, who has been living abroad for some time and has finally returned, much to Astoria's horror, as the two had been childhood friends prior but had slowly drifted apart afterwards. Travis, who harbours a rivalry with Shawn over who is more worthy to possess the family's sacred treasure, the Beast Mask, is challenged by his grandfather to guard it for the entire duration of the ball. Vicky and Kira combine their magic to get past the underground traps and successfully steal the mask, causing Travis to nearly be impaled before Hawk arrives to save him. Along with Joy and Ling Ling, the two boys rush to find the perpetrators and get the mask back before Coach Beast finds out, accidentally interrupting Astoria and Shawn, whom Rose had arranged for them to meet and reconcile at the castle pond. Although Astoria's ivy hair manages to retrieve the mask, the Snow Queen still manages to draw out its power to create icy dragons that cause chaos in the party. With help from Shawn, who turns all the masquerade ball's masks into replicas of the Beast Mask, Travis manages to invoke the power of the Beast Mask to manipulate the weather to his will, successfully defeating the Snow Queen and earning his grandfather's trust.
10	"The Shadow Warrior"	7 December 2017	January 28, 2018
The heroes spend a few days at IronFan castle to learn Ling Ling's family traditions, but a mysterious warrior attacks them during the night, stealing the IronFan family item.
11	"Princely Competition"	8 December 2017	February 4, 2018
At Regal Academy, the Princely Competition is in full swing, where princes all over the fairytale world arrive to compete and test their princeliness, with the winner automatically getting an A+ on the Chivalry exam and Grandpa Charming's magic charming cloak. With Grandpa Charming himself presiding as this year's judge, the competition heats up as the princes go through treacherous trials after trials, but Vicky and Kira plot to steal the cloak for the Snow Queen. With Hawk and Travis clinching only 3rd and 4th respectively in the first damsel-saving round, Astoria, Rose and Ling Ling attempt to train them with the help of Grandpa Charming, and Joy training Esquire Frog instead. As the next round of the competition begins, Travis and Hawk participate confidently with their female partners in a test of dragon dancing, but Vicky and Kira have armed Earl, the grandson of Grandpa Charming's old enemy Prince Surly, with cheat potions to win and earn the cloak for them. Astoria also turns Shawn down when he offers her to be his partner. Finally, a three-legged race eliminates Travis, but Hawk manages to make Earl lose his partner Kira, causing him to be disqualified despite finishing first. When Earl steals the cloak in desperation and turns everyone against them, Hawk manages to protect Alisha, Shawn, Rose and Joy with his family Mirror Shield, and with Rose's Glass Slippers and Joy's Frog Box, retrieves the cloak, winning the contest along with Shawn, who had crossed the finish line with him at the same time. Meanwhile, Ruby hears of the news and vows to steal Hawk for herself.
12	"The Dark Dragon"	9 December 2017	February 11, 2018
Sir George is at Regal Academy to teach the fundamentals of dragon dueling, together with his grandchild Gregory.
13	"A Day at Merlin Academy"	10 December 2017	February 18, 2018
The heroes spend a day at Merlin Academy to learn powerful wizard Merlin's magic spells.
14	"The Regal Parade"	26 September 2018	February 25, 2018
During the Regal Parade, villains isolate the heroes and kidnap the baby dragons, helped by Sir George's old enemy.
15	"A Mermaid's Tail"	27 September 2018	March 4, 2018
One day Rose wakes up and finds out she has become a mermaid, and the only one able to break the spell is the Little Mermaid herself.
16	"The Sleepover"	28 September 2018	March 11, 2018
Regal Academy welcomes two formerly homeschooled students: the Sleeping Beauty fraternal twins Adonis and Ambrosia, both whose beauty charms everyone at once. In an effort to be friends, the twins invite the students to a sleepover party at their castle, but Rose feels uneasy at how Ambrosia, while nice and kind, has a crush on Hawk, who seems to be equally entranced by her. The party gives Kira an idea to wreck some havoc, especially since Sleeping Beauty has invited the Evil Fairy to prevent a similar curse from befalling her grandchildren. Teamed up with the Snow Queen and the Evil Fairy to trap everyone in the castle, Kira, Vicky and Cyrus manage to put Joy, Ambrosia and Ardonis to sleep with potions, and continue to split up throughout the castle to do the same to everyone else. Astoria stay behind to take care of those who have fallen asleep whilst Rose, Hawk, Travis and Ling Ling rush to find everyone and return them to safety. As Travis is struck by Cyrus' potion, the remainder successfully manage to suppress the Evil Fairy and remove the enchanted mattresses trapping everyone in the castle, and split up, with Ling Ling and Astoria fending off the Snow Queen and Rose and Hawk trying to find Sleeping Beauty's family magic to break the sleeping spell. The two unsuccessfully try to awaken the twins with a kiss, but when it fails to work Rose secretly feels happy at the confirmation that Hawk isn't exactly in love with Ambrosia. Instead, Rose uses Mirror Hawk to wake Ambrosia and Adonis' own reflection to wake himself, allowing them to cast True Love Magic to break the Evil Fairy's spell. With the rest of the students awake, they help Astoria and Ling Ling fend off the Snow Queen, saving the sleepover. Ambrosia, remembering the kiss, decides to give up on her feelings for Hawk, but admits that she's still a little jealous of Rose and extends a hand of friendship to her.
17	"Test Of The Tower"	29 September 2018	March 18, 2018
Astoria decides to take the Regal Academy advance placement test, which is known to be notoriously difficult. However, Rapunzel decides to stop her granddaughter's enrolment, deciding that it is time for her to wait in the historic Rapunzel tower to be saved by a prince who will marry her through a competition testing their valour. Although initially appalled, Astoria agrees on the condition that her grandmother will let her take the advance placement test, and if she passes she will return to school. Vicky, Cyrus and Kira, thinking that Astoria being in the tower leaves her vulnerable, are determined to get rid of her. Conjuring a fake rulebook, they pinpoint the visiting Prince Leaf, who has wings on his back and a huge crush on Astoria, to bend the rules that princes cannot fly over with the help of a dragon. Despite Shawn reaching the tower first, he overhears Astoria wishing for someone she loves to marry her instead of one chosen through a contest, making him hesitate and Leaf almost ringing the bell first. As Leaf attempts to explain to the guardian dragon by showing the rulebook, it explodes and allows the Snow Queen's dragon to enter the premises and wreck mayhem, with Shawn rescuing Astoria on his dragon and Rose and Travis helping fend off the Snow Queen's. With no clear victor, the competition is declared void and Astoria successfully returns to school with the help of a magic talking book in the tower letting her pass the test and accepts Shawn's feelings for her.
18	"The Shapeshifting Witch"	30 September 2018	March 25, 2018
The heroes fly to Eea Island to find Calypso, the granddaughter of Circe, who placed a curse upon the LeFrog family.
19	"Ruby Returns"	1 October 2018	April 1, 2018
Rose and her friends fly to the Snow White Gem Mines to find the shining Dawn Gems, but evil Ruby is back to marry Hawk.
20	"Wedding Time"	2 October 2018	April 15, 2018
Hawk has been captured and imprisoned by Ruby, who is determined to marry him, inherit the Snow White family powers, and let the Snow Queen ruin his family. As preparations for the wedding begin, Snow White enlists Rose's help to save Hawk as the other teachers try to come up with a plan, until 6 mysterious invitations to the wedding arrive at Regal Academy. With Snow White leading them, Rose, Astoria, Travis, Joy and Ling Ling make preparations to the 1001 Nights Kingdom undercover to rescue Hawk. However, they are too late as Ruby officially exchanges wedding rings with Hawk, earning his wand that Rose had previously safeguarded. Astoria and Joy manage to capture the Stepsisters just as the rest subdue the other wedding guests, and Rose has a showdown with Ruby, managing to destroy her 5-hand armor with some help from the PomPoms, but gets struck by Ruby in the process. Annoyed at his helpless self, Hawk manages to break the armored shell he is encased in, and attempts to break the spell of the wedding ring as Rose uses her Glass Slippers to kick Ruby's off, managing to stop the wedding. A Dance of Reflection is held at Regal Academy to celebrate, where Rose and Hawk dance and sing together. Later, it is revealed that Vicky, Cyrus and Kira sent the invitations after getting annoyed at Ruby for bossing them around and assigning them to chair duty.
21	"The Midnight Effect"	3 October 2018	April 22, 2018
In order to create an original outfit with shoes, the students travel to get the magical Stardust.
22	"Christmas in The Fairy Tale Land"	4 October 2018	April 29, 2018
23	"Rainbow Magic"	5 October 2018	May 6, 2018
Since someone is stealing Regal Academy students precious belongings, sheriff Little Red Riding Hood and our hero's start to investigate in the school until they reach the end of the rainbow.
24	"The Snow Queen's Trap"	6 October 2018	May 13, 2018
In order to use strength against the six great fairytale families, the snow queen releases Hawk's sister Fala who she had kidnapped years before and uses her as a Pawn in Regal Academy.
25	"Rose in Wonderland"	7 October 2018	May 20, 2018
After the teachers are kidnapped by Kira and Vicky declares herself headmistress of Regal Academy, our hero's manage to meet Alice and get the ice key allowing access to the snow kingdom.
26	"The Snow Kingdom"	8 October 2018	May 27, 2018
Rose and the gang have one final battle with the snow queen in the snow kingdom. Rose manages to trap the snow queen in her own snow globe, and frees all other prisoners of the snow queen. Once they save the day, they have a party at Regal Academy and the snow queen officially becomes part of Rose's collection.

== Broadcast ==
In 2015, it was announced that Nickelodeon would globally broadcast the series. Regal Academy premiered in Italy on Rai YoYo on May 21, 2016. In the United States, it began airing on Nickelodeon on August 13, 2016. The second season premiered on Nickelodeon's sister channel Nick Jr. on November 5, 2017.

It also aired on Nickelodeon in Latin America, on Gulli and Nickelodeon Junior in France, on Nickelodeon in the UK and Ireland, on Nickelodeon in Poland (November 14–29, 2016), on ZOOM (since September 4, 2016) in Israel, on Nicktoons in South Africa (November 14, 2016) and a few weeks later on e.tv and etoonz, and on Nickelodeon, TuTy in the Czech Republic in Czech dub, and TV5 in the Philippines in Filipino dub. In the Middle East, it aired on Nickelodeon as well as MBC3.
