= The Girl in the Fog =

- Italian: La ragazza nella nebbia
- Directed by: Donato Carrisi
- Written by: Donato Carrisi
- Based on: La ragazza nella nebbia by Donato Carrisi
- Produced by: Maurizio Totti; Alessandro Usai
- Starring: Toni Servillo; Alessio Boni; Lorenzo Richelmy; Galatea Ranzi; Michela Cescon; Jean Reno
- Cinematography: Federico Masiero
- Edited by: Massimo Quaglia
- Music by: Vito Lo Re
- Production companies: Rainbow S.p.A. Medusa Film
- Release date: 26 October 2017
- Running time: 128 minutes
- Country: Italy
- Language: Italian

The Girl in the Fog (Italian: La ragazza nella nebbia) is a 2017 Italian psychological thriller film directed and written by Donato Carrisi. It is based on Carrisi's 2015 novel of the same name.

== Plot ==
Sixteen-year-old Anna Lou goes missing in the isolated mountain village of Avechot. Inspector Vogel and his partner Borghi come to the village to investigate, first meeting with the parents. Vogel instructs local police officers to don painter's outfits to search the nearby woods, drawing media attention about the investigation and enabling him to request more resources. The media soon compares the investigation to a previous one conducted by Vogel about a criminal dubbed "the mutilator".

== Cast ==
- Toni Servillo as Agent Vogel
- Alessio Boni as Professor Loris Martini
- Jean Reno as Dr. Augusto Flores
- Lorenzo Richelmy as Agent Borghi
- Galatea Ranzi as Stella Honer
- Michela Cescon as Agent Mayer
- Lucrezia Guidone as Clea
- Daniela Piazza as Maria Kastner
- Jacopo Olmo Antinori as Mattia
- Greta Scacchi as Beatrice Lehman
- Ekaterina Buscemi as Anna Lu

== Reception ==
=== Critical response ===
On the review aggregator website Rotten Tomatoes, 75% of 8 critics' reviews are positive, with an average rating of 5.8/10.

=== Awards ===
- 63rd David di Donatello — Best New Director (Migliore Regista Esordiente) Donato Carrisi
