= PopPixie =

Italian animated television miniseries

- Genre: Fantasy; Adventure
- Created by: Iginio Straffi
- Based on: Winx Club by Iginio Straffi
- Directed by: Iginio Straffi
- Country of origin: Italy
- Original language: Italian
- No. of seasons: 1
- No. of episodes: 26 (52 segments)

Production
- Running time: 13 minutes
- Production companies: Rainbow; Rai Fiction

Original release
- Network: Rai 2
- Release: 10 January – 22 March 2011

Related
- Winx Club

PopPixie is an Italian animated television miniseries created by Iginio Straffi. Its only season aired on Rai 2 for just over two months, from 10 January to 22 March 2011. The show features a group of pixies, who were first introduced as secondary characters in the second season of Winx Club. PopPixie is aimed at younger viewers, with an intended audience of 4 to 6-year-olds.

The miniseries was first announced in May 2009, and its first episode was previewed at MIPCOM. After Nickelodeon became a co-developer of the main Winx Club series, the company announced that PopPixie would air on its global network of channels beginning in late 2011.

PopPixie is set in a small town called Pixieville, which is inhabited by creatures like pixies, elves, and gnomes. The town is fed from the Tree of Life, an ancient tree that provides the Pixies' MagicPops, spheres that contain good magic related to a pixie's special talent. If a pixie uses her or his talent for good, she or he will receive a MagicPop and become a PopPixie. The Pixies are human kid-like tiny creatures. This show uses both rigged and traditional animation and features characters like Lockette, Amore, Chatta, Tune, Digit, Piff, Livy, Pam, Fixit, Martino, Caramel and Cherie.

== Characters ==
Promo artwork of Chatta and Fixit in a boat.

=== Pixies ===
- Lockette: Lockette is a magenta haired little girl whose MagicPop gives her the power to open magical passages and find everything which is hidden. She is the PopPixie of Direction. She works at the Pixie Plaza, the most famous hotel in Pixieville. She even drives the Pixie Plaza Service car. She is friends with Amore and is annoyed by Chatta. Her assistant is Guzman the monkey. Her signature color is purple.
- Caramel: Caramel is a red haired tomboyish little girl who runs the most famous bakery in Pixieville, the Molly Moo, and her MagicPop gives her incredible strength. She is the PopPixie of Super Strength and the twin sister of Martino. Her assistant is Tina the pig. Her signature color is yellow.
- Martino: He is a redhead little boy who the barman at the Molly Moo, his twin sister Caramel's bakery. His MagicPop gives him the power of doing incredible acrobatics, balancing and extraordinary strength. He is the Pixie of Acrobatics. He even helps his new best friend Plasto and is Cherie's new fiance.
- Amore: Amore is a dark pink-haired little girl, who owns the Love Shop, which is the only shop to be specialized in love potions and spells in Pixieville. She is the PopPixie of Feelings. Amore's love interest is Robinson, Pixieville's ranger. Her assistants are Otis the hippo, and Wiki the owl. Her signature color is pink.
- Chatta: Chatta is an optimistic golden-haired little girl who is the PopPixie of Gossip. She uses her loud gossip as a means of defending herself as well as of attacking her enemies. Her assistant is Blabla the frog. Her signature color is green.
- Cherie: Cherie is a dark blue-haired rich little girl, who is the PopPixie of Weather. She loves going on shopping sprees and has a mean, moody, cruel, selfish, jealous, snobby, spoiled, bratty, and bossy attitude. She owns a cruise ship and her MagicPop gives her the power of controlling the weather when she is happy, sad, or angry. Her assistant is Lulu the cat. Her signature colors are red and rosy-pink. For the most part, she strongly dislikes Lockette and is annoyed by Martino, who becomes her new fiancé.
- Fixit: Fixit is a purple haired little boy who the PopPixie of Technomagic, and works at the Toy Shop of the Gnome Augustus, where he uses his talent to make incredible toys. He is Lockette's best friend. His MagicPop gives him extraordinary intelligence which he uses to make unique inventions combining magic and Technomagic. His assistant is Rico the frog.
- Digit: Digit is also the PopPixie of Technomagic. His MagicPop gives him the power to using Technology. Digit was changed to a boy in PopPixie.
- Livy: Livy is the Pixie of Messages in Winx Club, but in PopPixie, his MagicPop gives him the ability to be super fast. Livy was changed to a boy as well. He is the PopPixie of Velocity.
- Pam: Pam is a blonde-haired little girl, who works at Dry & Cut, the most famous beauty salon in Pixieville. Her MagicPop makes it very fast. Her assistant is Bamboo the hedgehog. She is the PopPixie of Hand Speed. Her signature color is orange.
- Piff: Piff is an orange-haired toddler who is the PopPixie of Sweet Sleep and has a rabbit (also called Tina) for companion. She is able to talk, unlike Season 2 of Winx Club, where she only makes noises.
- Glim: Like Piff, Glim is a baby and can't talk. His suit lights up when he wants, resembling a firefly. In PopPixie, Glim is a boy and his MagicPop grants him the power to manipulate electrokinesis. He is the Pixie of Energy.
- Tune: Tune is a light purple haired little girl, who is the Pixie of Vocal Power and her MagicPop gives her the power to be good and to even cry and sing very sharply. Her assistant is Gunnar the squirrel. Her signature color is blue.
- Kara: She is the Pop Pixie of Creation. With a swipe of her paint brush, she can create almost anything. Her brother is Pixienardo and best and childhood friend is Chatta, the PopPixie of Gossip.
- Ranger Robinson: He is Pixieville's park ranger and Amore's love interest. Robinson knows a lot about animals and wildlife.
- Camilla: She is a shy little girl, who has invisible power but also sweet. After she scares Damien the little boy elf, she's got the MagicPop that turns her into PopPixie of Illusion.
- Camelia: She's the PopPixie of plants. She loves plants, and likes to hang out with her friends and she's the helpful, caring girl in the world. Martino falls in love with her, which makes Cherie jealous.
- Mola: Mola digs holes and has the ability to shoot the energy bolts which can create tunnels. She's the PopPixie of tunnels. She is the friend of Chatta and Livy.
- Flower: She is an important little girl who doesn't like Chatta at first, because Chatta had spilt coffee all over her. But in the end, Flower thanked her for saving the day after she wrote an article.
- Lola: She flies backwards, but having trouble to fly right, she only appears on "Flying Money".

=== Elves ===
- Floxy is a boy elf with a special talent for spiteful tricks and bad jokes. He is not particularly intelligent and is the most immature of the Elves. There is nothing that he takes seriously and since his organisational skills are nil, he follows Rex faithfully. Floxy is both lazy and greedy. He loves cakes more than money.
- Narcissa is equally lazy and quirky. She dreams of living the life of a great lady, something that Floxy cannot give her. Narcissa pushes Floxy to be better than the others and this often lands her fiancé in situations that she doesn't know how to get out of. For Narcissa, this is a very painful situation, and she reacts in all the wrong ways, feeling inferior to her chums who have better male partners than she has.
- Lenny is wacky and loves taking risks for the sake of excitement, reckless and irresponsible. Although he is unpredictable and independent, he is always the first to follow Rex and Yucca in some new raid on Pixieville.
- Yucca is the fiancé of Lenny. Yucca is frivolous and adores extreme shopping.
- Rex is an arrogant and haughty elf. He admires Maxine and thinks that the rest of the world is not worthy of his attention. Compared to the others, Rex has a more mature and criminal side to his character. This aspect of his character particularly appeals to Maxine, his fiancé who is very ambitious.
- Maxine is very malicious and is the dominating personality of the couple with Rex. As the meanie of the elves, she uses all her charm to keep Rex firmly where she wants him. As Rex is a model for the boy Elves, Maxine is the role model for girl Elves.

=== Other characters ===
Aside from Pixies, Pixieville is also home to gnomes and talking animals who help the Pixies.

== Episodes ==
No.	Title	Original release date
1	"L'invasione verde" "Green Attack"	January 10, 2011
Pam is worried because she still hasn't received her MagicPop. Meanwhile, the evil elves put a spell on the Tree Of Life, creating a carnivorous plant and suppressing the Pixies's magic.
2	"Un pesce fuor d'acqua" "A Pixie Fish"	January 11, 2011
Amore is afraid to talk to her love interest, Ranger Robinson, who asks her out. She obviously says yes. But since she is still very shy and nervous, she creates a love potion for herself to stop it. Unfortunately, it turns out that she actually made a fish potion, which transforms her into a Pixie Fish. Lockette, Chatta, Livy, and Fixit must do all they can to get Amore to the Rainbow Lake [where she was going for her date] as soon as possible, whilst trying to stop Robinson from finding out. In the end, Amore manages to transform back to herself, thanks to the lake, without Robinson finding out what happened. Livy gets his MagicPop. However, since Robinson had to swim to save Amore, the lake makes him lose his memory on who Amore is, making her faint.
3	"Cherie, una Pixie tempestosa" "Crazy Weather"	January 12, 2011
A spoiled rich girl Cherie invites everybody in Pixieville to her welcoming party. She is new in town and wants to have the perfect moment. She is the richest girl in Pixieville. She hangs out with Chatta, (but sometimes get annoyed by her like Lockette) Amore, Lockette, and Martino. But suspicious weather keeps on arriving. Thanks to Martino, it turns out that Cherie is the one that is causing the weather - Whenever she is happy, rainbow appears, when she is angry, lightning and thunder appears, when she is jealous, wind appears, and when she is sad and crying, rain appears. When a fire breaks out, thanks to a very angry dragon, Cherie is able to cry, making it rain and putting the fire out. Thanks to this, Cherie gets her MagicPop and turns into the PopPixie of Weather.
4	"Il segreto di Lockette" "Lockette's Secret"	January 13, 2011
Lockette's parents are coming, and she enlists the help of Martino to help her trick her parents to believe she is Pixieville's greatest baker.
5	"Le Pixiemonete volanti" "Flying Money"	January 14, 2011
Chatta, Cherie, Fixit, and Lockette must stop the evil elves from taking away all the money from Pixieville. But the question is, can they? Meanwhile, Chatta is trying to make a great newspaper interview in order to get her dream job as News Presenter.
6	"L'albero dei gelati di Caramel" "Caramel's Ice Cream Tree"	January 17, 2011
When Caramel feels overstretched by constant customers, she plants a magic ice cream tree to make her job easier. It all goes well at first, but then the ice cream wipes everything out in Pixieville. Using her PopPixie form, Caramel must stop this mess before it's over floated.
7	"L'incantesimo dello specchio" "The Mirror Spell"	January 18, 2011
Maxine, an evil elf, has a magic mirror that can do many things. She uses it to steal the money from the Pixie Plaza Hotel. With Lockette getting angry at Morpho for another one of his silliest tricks, he gets upset and bumps into Maxine. She flirts with him and convinces him to make her Lockette and Lockette her. But Morpho didn't know the truth until after he granted Maxine's request. Everybody goes after Maxine [who is actually Lockette]. Luckily, Morpho manages to capture the mirror and break it, breaking the spell and confusing everybody chasing Lockette. Later, Lockette thanks Morpho for what he did, making him happy again. He gets his MagicPop for his actions.
8	"L'intervista del secolo" "The Big Interview"	January 19, 2011
Chatta has gotten a big interview with a guy she has a crush on. But he isn't interested. Chatta also takes a random potion off Amore, thinking that it's a perfume, but it's actually a hair-growing formula. During the interview, Chatta realizes her mistake and begins to grow a long beard. With the help of her pals, they try to stop it. But nothing works. In the end, it turns out that the boy Chatta had a crush on is bald and doesn't really have hair, which is why he was concerned on many things that had go to do with the interview and Chatta. He asks Chatta to promise not to tell, which she agrees to. Meanwhile, Rollo invites a gang of gnomes to his hotel who are bald and want to grow a beard.
9	"Un robot per Chatta" "A Robot for Chatta"	January 20, 2011
For Chatta's birthday, Fixit builds Chatta a Pixiebot, a robot that will do physically anything but Pixieville runs amok when the Elfs take control of the Pixiebots. Fixit agrees to a deal that sells his Pixiebots in one shop but learns his MagicPop allows him duplicate them in seconds.
10	"Il mistero della MagicPop perduta" "The Mystery of Lost MagicPop"	January 21, 2011
Chatta and Amore win a stay at the Pixie Plaza hotel, and Lockette has to cater to their demands. Soon, Lockette has to multitask after a famous explorer's backpack disappears with a MagicPop inside.
11	"Camp Pixie" "Let's Go Camp Pixie"	January 24, 2011
Amore and Lockette visit Camp Pixie because Amore wants to see Ranger Robinson. They participate in a survival course led by the rangers, where the group of attendees are given a series of tests, with no magic allowed.
12	"Salviamo le scimmie svitate" "Save the Bumble Monkeys"	January 25, 2011
Chatta adopts a bumble monkey, hoping to impress the singer Justin Nimble.
13	"Il mio miglior amico" "My Best Friend"	January 26, 2011
Martino tries to help Plasto get a job, but Floxy and Narcissa ruin that for him.
14	"La pozione speciale di Amore" "Amore's Love Potion"	January 27, 2011
Amore leaves Otis in charge of the love shop to search for a magic flower for a new potion. Otis tries to make his crush notice him but it doesn't work so he turns to using Amore's love potions. It instantly backfires when different potions get mixed together, causing the whole town to fall in love with the Elves. When Amore comes back from her trip, she sees what happened to the town and rushes to figure out what potions were used and whips up an antidote to reverse the effects. She then gets her MagicPop and saves the town from the overwhelming spell.
15	"Il ladro di giocattoli" "Super Toy"	January 28, 2011
Fixit creates a new toy but is worried it might be evil. Believing it to be the toy of the century, Augustus does everything to get his hands on it.
16	"I PopPixie tecnomagici" "Techno MagicPop"	January 31, 2011
A virus corrupts Pixieville's Technomagic stations during a contest between Fixit and Digit.
17	"Un Elfo a scuola" "An Elf In School"	February 1, 2011
Two Elves drop off their spoiled son at Tune's school. The Elf tries to sabotage the Pixies' chances at getting their MagicPops.
18	"Gnomi impazziti" "Gnomes Gone Mad"	February 2, 2011
Maxine and Rex hypnotize the gnomes into being cruel to all pixies, at the same time Chatta gets kicked out of the Pixieville Chronicle. Chatta must use her voice to save the gnomes if she wants her MagicPop or the elves may takeover.
19	"Un bisticcio tra Elfi" "Lenny & Yucca At War"	February 3, 2011
Uh-oh? Lenny and Yucca, are in the middle of having a huge fight which Yucca ends up using her magic to throw furniture at Lenny, telling him to come back with his regular nasty self again. Chatta is featuring a segment on her show about Amore and her special skills at fixing love when she comes across the Elves. Only Amore, the broken hearts specialist, will be able to help Lenny and Yucca make up, but first she has to understand the Elves' real nature of being nasty, cruel, and disgusting.
20	"Un'epidemia a Pixieville" "The Silent Curse"	February 4, 2011
The Yearly Yodel Festival is approaching, and Tune hopes to get a trophy, but a cough attacks her at that moment and threatens to thwart her hopes, and she's not the only one.
21	"Gli eroi dello scuolabus" "The Schoolbus Heroes"	February 7, 2011
Piff ends up making everyone on a school bus yawn due to her doing it, and this gets everyone stranded in the middle of the forest. Can they get back on track or are they lost for good?
22	"Sono anch'io una PopPixie!" "I'm A PopPixie Too!"	February 8, 2011
While the citizens of Pixieville are sleeping, A gang rages through Pixieville and steals the MagicPops. To compensate, the Gnomes buy new MagicPops at a high price from a mysterious dealer. The Pixies go to investigate where these new MagicPops are coming from only to find out that the Elves are behind this. They return the stolen MagicPops and give them back to their rightful owners.
23	"Sei licenziato!" "You're Fired!"	February 9, 2011
When Guzman gets fired from the Pixie Plaza, he tries to get another job, but fate does not smile on him. He then finds Pixie Leonardo's backpack and becomes a great artist. When a spell makes all of his paintings come to life, it's up to him, Lockette, and Amore to reverse it.
24	"Capelli selvaggi" "Bad Hair Day"	February 10, 2011
An evil mushroom cloud ruins the citizens hair, and forces Pam's beauty salon to shut down. As this happens a new beauty salon has opened in town. Could it be a coincidence or is there a connection between this new salon and the mushroom cloud?
25	"Il talento di Martino" "Martino's Special Talent"	February 11, 2011
Molly Moo is stuck with her clumsy assistant while Caramel has received amnesia.
26	"L'attacco dei ragni giganti" "Giant Spiders Invasion"	February 14, 2011
The Pixies and Gnomes are starting to clean up the Elves' neighbourhood, The Elves are making the spiders grow bigger to take over Pixieville for their revenge.
27	"La corsa all'oro degli Gnomi" "The Gnomes' Gold Rush"	February 15, 2011
The gnomes' gold rush is nearing, but the gnomes themselves are strangely unaccounted for.
28	"Il party perfetto" "The Perfect Party"	February 16, 2011
Cherie attends her ex-fiancé's engagement party with Martino and Amore.
29	"Un cucciolo divertente" "A Funny Pet"	February 17, 2011
Lockette's cousin Giga finds a long-tongued chameleon that has the ability to change size like Giga can.
30	"Il gran premio di Pixieville" "The Pixieville Grand Prix"	February 18, 2011
Lockette enters the Pixievile Grand Prix race with the Pixie Plaza's car.
31	"Un talent show esplosivo" "A Stormy Talent Show"	February 21, 2011
Cherie enters a talent-competition, but her other friends doubt she can win, unless they enter too just to lose on purpose.
32	"Lo spettacolo scoppiettante di Jolly" "Jolly's Crackling Exhibition"	February 22, 2011
The Pudgy Pigeons are performing on the stage, but then they've eating everything and grow bigger.
33	"Amore e i draghi litigiosi" "Amore and the Quarreling Dragons"	February 23, 2011
Amore, Otis, and Wiki journey to find the Lost Ladle of the Cave Gnomes, but they have competition in two dragons also after the artifact.
34	"Un ammiratore per Chatta" "Chatta's Biggest Fan"	February 24, 2011
An elf named Zepto idolizes Chatta, but she finds him annoying, and asks some of her friends for help in getting rid of him at the football field.
35	"L'ultimo Gnomo" "The Last Gnome"	February 25, 2011
When they saw the film, the Elves found the talisman to turn all the gnomes into stone.
36	"L'assalto sotterraneo degli Elfi" "The Elves' Underground Assault"	February 28, 2011
Rex and his gang try to get in a bankvault by using molesaurs, but their tunneling creates sinkholes to show up in Pixieville.
37	"MagicPop in pericolo" "MagicPops in Danger"	March 1, 2011
An elf named Sinia is stealing MagicPops to keep her illusion as a beautiful pixie alive.
38	"Una giornata elettrizzante" "An Electrifying Day"	March 2, 2011
The Elves sabotaging the power station and all the rides at the Pixie Park go haywire.
39	"Tre desideri straordinari" "Three Amazing Wishes"	March 3, 2011
The Elves grand 3 wishes with a magic mirror and unleash the monster to wreck everything in town.
40	"I Pixie lillipuziani" "The Lilluputian Pixies"	March 4, 2011
The Elves have put a shrinking spell on Pixies, gnomes and animals, and this prevents the Pixies from using their MagicPops.
41	"Il rivale chiacchierone di Chatta" "Chatta's Chatting Rival"	March 7, 2011
Right after Lockette criticizes her for being a chatterbox, Chatta decides to stop talking. So, Chatta accidentally unleashes a non-stop talking creature that destroys everything around it unless it gets its questions answered. Can Chatta satisfy and silence this vocal monstrocity?
42	"Più in fretta, Pam!" "Hurry Up, Pam"	March 8, 2011
Nappa the Snail Queen uses the slowness curse on Pam, Lockette and Chatta for being late at the hairdressers.
43	"La coccinella della sfortuna" "The Bad-Luck Ladybug"	March 9, 2011
Martino falls in love with a new girl Camellia, which makes Cherie jealous. Instead of going to the garden center. Martino accidentally takes Bugsy the ladybug's home as the right pumpkin to make a cake for Camellia, until he and the others got cursed, so they find the new pumpkin for his new home.
44	"Un brutto raffreddore per Fixit e Martino!" "Fixit and Martino's Bad Cold!"	March 10, 2011
During a lakeside picnic, Fixit and Martino challenge each other to a diving contest, which becomes the biggest mistake of their lives.
45	"Le tortine zuccherose di Caramel" "Caramel's Sugary Cupcakes"	March 11, 2011
When Caramel gives everybody in town her sugar filled cupcakes, Doctor Boxen the Pixieville dentist must stop her by transforming Caramel, Cherie, Chatta, Lockette, and Amore into sugar eating monsters to teach them a lesson.
46	"Vita da Cherie" "Living Like Cherie"	March 14, 2011
Rich and spoiled Cherie is forced to work at the Pixie Plaza's reception desk.
47	"La sfida tra Caramel e Martino" "A Competition Between Caramel & Martino"	March 15, 2011
Caramel and Martino start arguing so much that they stop being friends and become rivals in the Molly Moo business, and both try to outdo the other.
48	"Sirene, le migliori amiche dei PopPixie" "Mermaids, PopPixies' Best Friends!"	March 16, 2011
The Pixies go underwater to stop a nasty shark from eating the mermaid town.
49	"Un tesoro ai piedi dell'arcobaleno" "A Treasure Under the Rainbow"	March 17, 2011
The Pixies, the Elves and the Gnomes race towards the end of the rainbow to find the treasure.
50	"La pozione delle Sirene" "The Mermaids' Potion"	March 18, 2011
The Elves turn all the Pixies, gnomes and animals into sea creatures.
51	"La minaccia di Rex a Pixieville" "Rex's Threat on Pixieville"	March 21, 2011
A molesaur puppy has damaged the Tree of Life's roots and because of it, the town's forcefield is disabled, allowing the elves to invade.
52	"Salviamo l'Albero della Vita!" "Saving the Tree of Life!"	March 22, 2011
The Elves have finally conquered Pixieville with help from the Command Stick and the creatures it controls, and Rex plans to destroy the Tree of Life. Can the Pixies stop him?
