= Maya Fox =

Horror comics series

Publication information
- Publisher: Rainbow SpA; Arnoldo Mondadori Editore
- Genre: Horror
- Publication date: October 2008 – 2011
- Main character(s): Maya Fox

Creative team
- Created by: Iginio Straffi; Silvia Brena
- Written by: Iginio Straffi; Silvia Brena
- Artist(s): Iginio Straffi
- Penciller(s): Vincenzo Nisco
- Inker(s): Elena de' Grimani
- Letterer(s): Red Whale (Francesco Artibani)

Maya Fox is a series of horror comics and novels from Rainbow SpA, an Italian studio owned by Iginio Straffi and (formerly) Viacom at the time of the series' conclusion. The franchise's title character was co-created by Straffi, known for his previous creation Winx Club, and Silvia Brena, the former director of Cosmopolitan Italy. Straffi and Brena co-wrote each of the comic issues and four Maya Fox novels. The series follows a young woman named Maya Fox who lives in London. After her father is murdered by a serial killer named Michael Gacy, Maya discovers that she has the ability to speak with the dead. While avoiding Gacy, she works to prevent an apocalypse in 2012.

In Italy, the first Maya Fox novel and an extract from the first comic issue were jointly published on 28 October 2008 by Arnoldo Mondadori Editore. Three sequel novels and a monthly comic magazine were released from 2009 to 2011.

In late 2008, Iginio Straffi revealed plans for Maya Fox adaptations for both television and cinema, depending on the success of magazine sales. In 2010, a script for the feature film adaptation was written by Jane Prowse for a release date of late 2011. The project was left unfinished.

== Background ==
In September 2005, Silvia Brena interviewed Iginio Straffi for the magazine IO Donna, which inspired a collaboration between the two. They met again in 2006 to develop a concept that would appeal to young adults between the ages of 15 and 25, a target that Brena called "one of the most attractive markets for those involved in entertainment." Rainbow's publishing manager, Cristiana Buzzelli, carried out some research on what topics were popular with teenagers and found that "they are particularly fascinated by thrillers and the supernatural." Working off of this idea, they centered the story of Maya Fox around the 2012 phenomenon, a belief that the world would end in December 2012.

In an interview with the magazine Millionaire, Brena elaborated on the choice to focus on the apocalypse, saying that the "2012 date seemed perfect. Many peoples have attributed a high symbolic value to it—not only the Mayans, but also the Egyptians, the Cambodians, and the Europeans with Nostradamus. It marks an end, but also a rebirth. A date that is, in short, very 'salable'."

Straffi designed the titular character to appeal to rebellious teenagers, wearing dark makeup and black clothes. Like his previous works, Maya Fox's drawing style was heavily influenced by manga. Alessandra Rota of la Repubblica called the comics' visual style "very close to that of Japanese manga models, only a little less gloomy."

== Publication history ==
Mondadori Editore released the first novel (La predestinata) on 28 October 2008 with a print run of 40,000 copies. The second (Il quadrato magico) was published in November 2009; the third (Domani, 2012) was published in October 2010; and the fourth (2012, la rivelazione) was published in November 2011. The novel series was published internationally by Carlsen Verlag in Germany, by Pocket Jeunesse in France, and by Planeta Group in Latin America, Spain, and Portugal.

The comic stories were serialized across 12 issues of a teen magazine based on the Maya Fox character, called Maya Fox: Tag Your Life. Every issue featured thirty pages of a comic (each 30-page installment was called an "episode"). The first episode, Oltre la morte (Beyond Death), was included in both the first novel in October 2008 as well as the April 2009 launch issue of Tag Your Life. The magazine had a print run of 150,000 copies.

== Plot ==
The lead characters of the series, Maya (left) and Trent (right).

Three years after the murder of her father, David, Maya Fox discovers that she can communicate with the dead. She receives a message from David, warning her that the end of the world is near but that she can prevent it. While she rushes to solve a string of puzzles relating to the apocalypse, Maya learns that her father's killer, Michael Gacy, has escaped from prison. Michael sends multiple profane letters to Maya and her mother, indicating that he has made a plan to kill Maya on the last day of the month. When the day comes, Maya narrowly avoids Michael with the help of her father.

== Reception ==
According to Rainbow in May 2009, the comic magazine sold approximately 70,000—80,000 copies every month in kiosks around Italy. As of August 2010, 100 thousand combined copies of the novel series had been sold worldwide.

Reviewing the first novel based on Maya Fox, Alessandra Rota of la Repubblica wrote that its "presentation strategy is spot-on ... the ingredients of teenage angst are all there, as well as those of noir." Kirill Reshetnikov of the Russian magazine Vzglyad complimented the series' blend of supernatural themes with a "sensible and charismatic" protagonist relatable to teenagers. He called Maya Fox "something so eclectic that it cannot be ignored." Pino Cottogni of FantasyMagazine wrote that "Maya is destined to win over [Winx Club fans'] older sisters."

== Credits ==
- Iginio Straffi – co-creator, co-director, character designer, story supervisor, art supervisor
- Silvia Brena – co-creator, co-director, story supervisor
- Elena de' Grimani – inks
- Vincenzo Nisco – art supervisor, penciller
- Giulia Basile – colors
- Paolo Maddaleni – colors
- Nicola Pasquetto – colors
- Giorgio Viola – colors
- Red Whale (Francesco Artibani) – lettering

Credits adapted from the magazine's list of artists.
