= Huntik: Secrets & Seekers =

Italian TV series

- Genre: Action; Adventure; Fantasy
- Created by: Iginio Straffi
- Directed by: Iginio Straffi
- Creative director: Simone Borselli
- Voices of: Yuri Lowenthal; Drew Aaron; Marc Thompson; Karen Strassman; Rebecca Soler
- Opening theme: "Huntik Go"
- Ending theme: "Heroes and Titans"
- Composers: Michele Bettali; Stefano Carrara; Fabrizio Castania
- Countries of origin: Italy; Netherlands (season 1)
- Original languages: Italian; English
- No. of seasons: 2
- No. of episodes: 52 (list of episodes)

Production
- Executive producers: Joanne Lee; Annita Romanelli
- Producer: Iginio Straffi
- Production companies: Rainbow S.p.A. Rai Fiction; Big Bocca Productions (season 1)

Original release
- Network: Rai Due
- Release: 12 January 2009 – 11 December 2011

Huntik: Secrets & Seekers is an Italian animated television series created by Iginio Straffi, the creator of Winx Club. It was produced by Rainbow S.p.A. and Rai Fiction with the co-production of Big Bocca Productions for the first season. The series is about four adventurers who are part of a group called the Huntik Foundation, led by their top operative Dante Vale. Each episode takes place in a different historical city and features magical elements inspired by European mythology. The characters are designed in a style that combines Japanese anime with Western animation.

Iginio Straffi conceived Huntik in 2006. Its visual elements, artwork, and music were produced in Italy, while animation and some scriptwriting were done abroad. The first season premiered on Rai Due in Italy on 12 January 2009, and set a record number of viewers when it was rerun on Rai Gulp. Production on a second season began shortly after the premiere of the first.

The second season debuted in Italy in 2011. That same year, Viacom gained 30% ownership of the Rainbow studio, and Huntik's second season premiered on Viacom's Nickelodeon networks internationally. Season two premiered on Nicktoons on April 21, 2013, in the United States.

== Series overview ==
The series follows Lok Lambert as he uncovers the secret legacy of his missing father Eathon, who was a member of the Huntik Foundation and a part of a secret world of magic users known as Seekers and creatures known as Titans. On his mission to uncover what happened to his father, Lok is joined by Dante Vale, Sophie Casterwill, Zhalia Moon, and the talking Titan Cherit.

The first season focuses on the fight against the evil Organization, led by a powerful Seeker known as the Professor, real name Simon Judeau. Along the way, the team discovers the Amulet of Will and the powerful Legendary Titans. Although the Professor eventually acquires the three Legendary Titans of Mind, Body, and Spirit in a bid for immortality, the Huntik team defeats him.

In the second season, an ancient and evil group known as the Blood Spiral reveals itself and seeks to summon the Nullifiers, evil and destructive beings. They are linked to the destruction of Sophie's remaining family, the descendants of the powerful Lord Casterwill. A new hero, Den Fears, joins the Huntik team as Zhalia goes undercover within the Blood Spiral. A new set of Legendary Titans are uncovered, but their discovery heralds the resurrection of the Blood Spiral's founder, the Betrayer.

== Cast and characters ==
- Lok Lambert (voiced by Yuri Lowenthal in the first season and Matt Caplan in the second season): The son of the legendary Seeker, Eathon Lambert. Though bored by textbooks, he excels at solving puzzles. Lok grew up knowing nothing about Seekers until he discovers his father's Amulet, and now aspires to be a top Seeker like him. During the first season, Lok is a key member of the team that takes down the Professor, Simon Judeau. During the second season, Lok becomes the new Champion of Casterwill to fight against the Blood Spiral. Over the course of the series, he develops romantic feelings for Sophie. His Titan is Kipperin, a green flying moth.
- Dante Vale (voiced by Marc Thompson): The Huntik Foundation's top Seeker, who leads a team consisting of Lok Lambert, Sophie Casterwill, and Zhalia Moon. He uses his skills as a Seeker, a martial artist, and a detective to lead the team on a mission to find Eathon. His Titan is Caliban, a powerful Aztec warrior.
- Zhalia Moon (voiced by Karen Strassman): A lone wolf who uses her abilities for espionage and creating illusions. At a young age, Klaus, a member of the Organization, adopted her, and she struggles between her upbringing in the Organization and her new friends within the Huntik Foundation. During the second season, she infiltrates the Blood Spiral for the Foundation and serves as a bodyguard for Harrison Fears. Her Titan is Gareon, a gecko-like creature who can turn invisible.
- Sophie Casterwill (voiced by Rebecca Soler): A book-smart girl from the Casterwill family's House of Nobles. Her family was lost due to arson, leaving her to believe herself to be the last of the Casterwill nobility. Her bodyguard, Santiago, and her tutor/butler, LeBlanche, raised her. Because of her training, she is able to sense magical energy and easily learn new spells. During the first season, she has a rivalry with Zhalia. During the second season, she assumes the position of the head of the Casterwill family. As the story progresses, she develops romantic feelings for Lok. Her Titan is Sabriel, an elegant swordswoman.
- Cherit (voiced by Marc Thompson): An ancient, bat-like Titan who was once Lord Casterwill's friend. He is among the only Titans who are able to speak audibly. Through unknown causes, he lost his memories of the past and his Amulet. His adventures with the Huntik Foundation help him to rediscover his past as he assists them by powering up allied Titans.
- Den Fears (voiced by Grant George): He and his brother, Harrison, grew up as outcasts and orphans. Like Lok, he dislikes having to study from books. Due to having been marked by the Spiral, Den is able to sense when the Spiral is performing evil. During the second season, the Blood Spiral attempts to recruit him, but Den sees them as evil and instead joins the Huntik Foundation, fighting against the Blood Spiral to save Harrison from their influence. His Titan is Vigilante, a dark cloaked assassin.
- Simon Judeau/The Professor (voiced by Mike Pollock): A former member of the Huntik Foundation and the founder of the Organization. After a mission with Eathon, he was cursed and his body was mangled. He is the only one who knows the truth of what happened to Eathon. Because of his time as a team with Eathon, he named his dog after him. During the first season, the Professor is the leader of the Organization until the Huntik team defeats him. His Titan is Araknos, a spider-like Legendary Titan who can control minds.
- Grier (voiced by Richard Epcar): The rightful ruler of Sutos, who believes that discipline will lead to peace. In the first season, he is part of the Organization to bring peace from civil war to the people of Sutos. In the second season, he fights alongside Dante against the Blood Spirals and takes control of the Organization from Wilder. His Titan is Breaker, a huge four-armed bear.
- Rassimov (voiced by Maddie Blaustein in the first season and Marc Diraison in the second season): The former leader of the Blood Spiral under the Betrayer. During the first season, Rassimov infiltrates the Organization and orchestrates the Professor's downfall, planting Demigorgan as a Holotome within his lair. During the second season, Rassimov reveals his true allegiance. His Titan is Thornment, an Egyptian mummy who uses sharp vines to ensnare her enemies.
- Mr. Wilder (voiced by Christopher Kromer): The second leader of the Organization. His Titan is Incubane, a mischievous demon who can fire lasers from his hands.
- Kiel (voiced by Matt Bernhard): A Blood Spiral fanatic and a pyromaniac who was part of Sophie's past. His Titan is Vulcana, a robed lava woman with power over fire.
- The Betrayer: One of the original Seekers under Lord Casterwill, who betrayed the early Casterwill family to summon the Nullifiers to Earth. Though the children of Lord Casterwill defeated him, he used the power of the Blood Spiral to remain alive. During the second season, he deceives the Huntik team into breaking the seal on the Spiral Mark, resurrecting him and signaling the arrival of the Nullifiers. Although he is defeated, his succeeds in activating the Spiral Mark to signal the Nullifiers. His Titan is Demigorgan, the Legendary Titan of Betrayal.

== Production ==
Iginio Straffi conceived Huntik in 2006 as a spiritual successor to his previous show, Winx Club. Just as the Winx characters were modelled on popular singers, Straffi looked to movie stars when designing the Huntik characters: Johnny Depp served as the basis for Dante Vale, Demi Moore for Zhalia Moon, and Gwyneth Paltrow for Sophie Casterwill. In developing the show, Iginio Straffi wanted to create a "cultured alternative to Japanese manga and American cartoons, giving viewers the opportunity to learn about Italian and European culture." A first season of 26 episodes was announced in October 2006, along with a reported budget of approximately US$8.62 million.

After drawing his initial concept art for Huntik, Straffi "hammered out the kernel of the show" with the help of an international creative team at his animation studio, Rainbow SpA. During these meetings, Sean Molyneaux was tasked with creating the Huntik series bible, a "master document" that covered the show's character descriptions, backstories, and episode synopses. Molyneaux, who was co-writing Winx Club: The Secret of the Lost Kingdom with Iginio Straffi at the time, stated that he "was given a decent amount of freedom to flesh out the details of the plot, the main characters, their story arcs and their pasts, and was responsible for the secondary characters pretty much top to bottom."

The designers of Huntik used e-mail to correspond with each other. All of the design ideas began from the descriptions in either the series bible or an episode script, from which the artists either went "off in their own direction" or wrote to Sean Molyneaux for guidance. When writing new characters in scripts, Molyneaux tried to keep his "descriptions minimalist at first, maybe mentioning a single important fact (a personality trait, or a physical trait in the case of a Titan), hoping that maybe this will inspire the designer." To illustrate the backgrounds of the series, the artists studied photos and visual maps online. After the backgrounds and character animations were put together, art director Simone Borselli reviewed every individual scene three times over (for the first season, there were 11,700 scenes to review). Once the audio effects were added, Borselli repeated the process again, this time reviewing each scene twice.

When drafting the show's action sequences, the Huntik staff avoided violence that could be emulated by viewers. They preferred monster fights over human combat scenes, and instead of punches, the writers called for "spheres of energy" to be shown onscreen. Maurizio De Angelis, the show's story editor, supervised all scripts from Rainbow's studio in Italy. In 2009, he explained that "each screenplay is subject to countless changes, the time ranging from two or three weeks to five or six months." The first season of Huntik involved around three years of writing and revisions, while the second season took almost a year and a half.

== Broadcast ==
In Italy, Rai Due first broadcast Huntik: Secrets & Seekers on 12 January 2009 at 7:25 a.m. In the United States, the first season premiered on The CW on 3 January 2009, nine days ahead of the Italian debut. Rainbow first released a trailer for the second season in July 2011. In Italy, the new season premiered on Rai Due on 17 September 2011. Rai Gulp replayed the episodes beginning on 22 September. In the UK, the programme aired on CITV.

Following a 2011 purchase in which Viacom gained 30% ownership of Rainbow, Huntik was broadcast on Viacom's Nickelodeon channels worldwide, including Nicktoons in the United States. The second season made its American premiere on Nicktoons, and the full episodes were uploaded on Nicktoons' website.

== Reception ==
In 2009, Will Wade of Common Sense Media wrote that the series "is fun to watch ... if you don't ask too many questions. The action sequences are exciting, the Titans are fearsome, the story is interesting, and the animation is lush and beautiful." Reviewing the show's first DVD release, Mark Beresford of Impulse Gamer positively compared the show's adventure-focused story to the Tintin animations. He commented that the episodes "are pretty addictive and will leave you wanting to get your hands on the rest of the series."

== Other media ==
A tie-in Huntik trading card game was developed by Upper Deck and released in February 2009, along with starter packs and booster packs. A line of 5 inch action figures has also been released, along with a collection of miniature Titan figures. A Nintendo DS game based on Huntik was announced in mid-2009 for release later that year. The game was ultimately unreleased, but it was planned to feature a 20-hour single-player mission as well as a multiplayer mode. In 2010, an IOS app named "Huntik: Titan Defence" was developed by Celestial Digital Entertainment Ltd. and was released on September 26.

In 2011, two Huntik-themed attractions opened at the MagicLand theme park in Rome. One is a shooting dark ride called "Huntik 5D," which incorporates an animated Huntik short produced by Rainbow CGI. Each of the ride's guided cars cost 120,000 euros to make. The other is a log flume called "Huntik Spillwater" (later renamed "Yucatan").
