= Into the Labyrinth (film) =

- Theatrical release poster
- Italian: L'uomo del labirinto
- Directed by: Donato Carrisi
- Written by: Donato Carrisi
- Based on: L'uomo del labirinto by Donato Carrisi
- Produced by: Maurizio Totti; Alessandro Usai
- Starring: Dustin Hoffman; Toni Servillo; Valentina Bellè; Vinicio Marchioni
- Cinematography: Federico Masiero
- Edited by: Massimo Quaglia
- Production companies: Gavila; Colorado Film Production; Rainbow S.p.A.
- Distributed by: Medusa Distribuzione
- Release date: October 30, 2019
- Running time: 130 minutes
- Country: Italy
- Languages: Italian and English
- Budget: €4 million (est.)

Into the Labyrinth (Italian: L'uomo del labirinto) is a 2019 Italian thriller film directed and written by Donato Carrisi. It is based on Carrisi's 2017 novel of the same name. The film stars Toni Servillo, Valentina Bellè, Vinicio Marchioni and Dustin Hoffman. The film was released in Italy and the U.S. in October 2019.

== Plot ==
The story begins with Samantha Andretti, discovered after going missing for 15 years. She was abducted as a teenager and kept in captivity, enduring years in a hidden, isolated underground labyrinth. When she is found, she is disoriented, with fragmented memories, and is hospitalized under the care of Dr. Green, a psychologist who specializes in profiling and trauma. Dr. Green employs unconventional methods to help her piece together what happened, using intense psychological sessions to try to break through her mental barriers and recover memories of her abductor.

At the same time, Bruno Genko, a private investigator with a terminal illness, learns about Samantha’s reappearance. Years before, Genko had been hired by Samantha’s parents to find her, but he failed, and it has haunted him ever since. Driven by a mix of guilt and professional duty, he sees her return as his last chance to redeem himself and sets out to investigate the case again.

The story alternates between Samantha’s therapy sessions with Dr. Green, where she struggles to recall her abductor—whom she remembers as a masked figure who forced her to play sadistic mind games—and Genko’s determined search for clues. As he digs deeper, Genko uncovers a complex and hidden world of people involved in the dark web and elaborate “games” where human lives are at stake, piecing together evidence that suggests Samantha’s abduction was part of something larger and more sinister than a single kidnapping.

Throughout their respective journeys, Samantha and Genko encounter multiple twists and turns that reveal layers of deception, with the story’s timeline and perspectives constantly shifting. Samantha’s memories reveal clues that help Genko move closer to the truth, and as he nears the end of his investigation, he discovers a chilling truth: the labyrinth was not just a physical prison but also a psychological trap, designed to manipulate and break its captives.

In a final twist, it becomes clear that Dr. Green, the psychologist, is not who he seems and has a hidden connection to Samantha’s captivity. His treatment methods are revealed to be a continuation of the mind games she endured, adding a shocking layer to her ordeal. The film ends ambiguously, leaving some mysteries unsolved and hinting at the cyclical nature of manipulation, and imprisonment, continuing beneath the surface.

== Cast ==
- Dustin Hoffman as Doctor Green
- Toni Servillo as Bruno Genko
- Valentina Bellè as Mila Vasquez
- Vinicio Marchioni as Simon Berish
- Katsiaryna Shulha as Linda
- Riccardo Cicogna as Paul MacInsky
- Luis Gnecco as Mordecai Lumann

== Production ==
Principal photography for the film took place in Rome.

== Reception ==
Into the Labyrinth has an approval rating of 40% on review aggregator website Rotten Tomatoes, based on 5 reviews, and an average rating of 5/10.
