= Rainbow (company) =

Italian studio

Rainbow S.p.A.
- Trade name: Rainbow
- Formerly: Rainbow S.r.l. (1995–2018)
- Type: Private
- Founded: April 1995; 31 years ago
- Founder: Iginio Straffi
- Headquarters: Loreto, Ancona, Italy
- Area served: Worldwide
- Key people: Iginio Straffi (CEO)
- Products: Television series; Films
- Owner: Iginio Straffi
- Subsidiaries: Bardel Entertainment; Gruppo Iven S.p.A.; (Colorado Film); Rainbow CGI; Moviement Talent Agency; Tridimensional; Witty Toys
- Website: rbw.it

Rainbow S.p.A. is an Italian studio founded by Iginio Straffi and formerly co-owned by Viacom (later Paramount Global) from 2011 to 2023. Rainbow has collaborated with Viacom/Paramount's other company, Nickelodeon, on multiple shows, including Winx Club and Club 57. The studio is based in Loreto, Marche and was founded by Straffi in 1995.

== History ==
Rainbow began as an animation studio, providing creative services for larger companies until it secured enough funds for original productions.

In April 2008, Rainbow signed a five-year co-production partnership with German media entertainment company Made 4 Entertainment (M4E) to develop and produce television series with M4E granting the rights to then-upcoming season of Rainbow's series Winx Club and its then-upcoming spin-off Pixie (now PopPixie) as the latter would manage distribution to the two series alongside Rainbow whilst Rainbow and M4E would co-produce a new television series.

In February 2011, Viacom purchased 30% of the company for 62 million euros (US$83 million), leaving the remaining 70% to Iginio Straffi. Viacom's Nickelodeon networks broadcast Rainbow's shows worldwide, and Rainbow acts as the licensing agent for Nickelodeon's shows in Italy. Nickelodeon's American studios have also collaborated with Rainbow on several productions, including Winx Club from 2011 to 2015 and Club 57 in 2019.

In 2015, Rainbow purchased fellow animation studio Bardel Entertainment.

In June 2016, Rainbow who produced the CGI/live-action property Mia and Me with German media brand management and media company Made 4 Entertainment (m4e) under the latter's subsidiary Hahn & m4e Productions had sold their 50% majority international rights stake in the popular show to the German entertainment company Made 4 Entertainment (m4e) as the latter company will plan to grow its IP to other countries while Rainbow had retained distribution rights to the show in Italy.

In August 2017, following the success of its teen series Maggie & Bianca Fashion Friends, Rainbow strengthened its live-action and animation production & distribution operations by acquiring a majority stake in entertainment company Gruppo Iven S.p.A. and its production subsidiaries including production arm Colorado Film, recording unit San Isidro Edizioni Musicali and film production/distributor Gavila, the buyout of a majority stake in Gruppo Iven had increased Rainbow's live-action production operations as the latter group became a subsidiary and would utilize Rainbow's international reach while Gruppo Iven's chairmen Maurizio Totti continued to lead the group under Rainbow.

In April 2018, Straffi and Viacom listed the company on the Italian stock exchange. The listing followed years of consideration regarding which country's stock market to enter (the United States or Italy). According to Straffi, this presented "a real dilemma" as Viacom was already listed on an American stock exchange, but Rainbow performed best in European countries. Straffi and Viacom withdrew Rainbow from the stock market in May 2018, citing a lack of suitable market conditions.

After almost 12 years of co-ownership, Paramount sold its stake back to Straffi in January 2023. While Nickelodeon would continue to be a broadcast partner for the studio, the purchase allowed Straffi full control of Rainbow's future projects.

In December 2025, the company celebrated its 30th anniversary. Rainbow also expanded its publishing portfolio with the acquisition of the successful children's book franchise Geronimo Stilton, alongside its spin-off series Tea Sisters, from its creators Elisabetta Dami and Pietro Marietti. Rainbow had previously handled licensing for Geronimo Stilton and Tea Sisters globally.

In March 2026, Rainbow entered the SVOD platforms by establishing its new premium SVOD channel on Prime Video Channels entitled Winx Club & Friends that brings Rainbow's Winx Club franchise & Rainbow's programming on one streaming premium channel as it became available in Italy, the UK, Finland and Sweden, while the new SVOD channel would bring new episodes alongside films & series on the SVOD platform.

== Filmography ==
=== Television series ===
Title	Years	Network	Notes
Tommy & Oscar	2000–2002	Rai 1	co-production with Rai Fiction
Prezzemolo	2002–2003	Italia 1	co-production with Gardaland
Colorado	2003–2019	Italia 1	co-production with Colorado Film and 3Zero2
Winx Club	2004–2019	Rai 2/Rai Gulp; Nickelodeon (International)	Rai Fiction (seasons 1–7), Nickelodeon Animation Studio (seasons 5–7) and Rai Ragazzi (season 8)
Monster Allergy	2005–2009	Rai 2 M6 (France); Kika (Germany)	co-production with Futurikon and Rai Fiction
Huntik: Secrets & Seekers	2009–2012	Rai 2	co-production with Rai Fiction and Big Bocca Productions (season 1)
PopPixie	2010–2011	Rai 2	co-production with Rai Fiction
Mia and Me	2012–2023	Rai 2/Rai Gulp; Kika (Germany)	seasons 1–2 only co-production with Hahn & m4e Productions, Rai Fiction (seasons 1–2) and March Entertainment (season 1); Currently owned by Studio 100 International
Crazy Block (pilot)	2014	Nickelodeon	
Regal Academy	2016–2018	Rai Yoyo; Nickelodeon (International)	co-production with Rai Fiction
Maggie & Bianca: Fashion Friends	2016–2017	Rai Gulp; Netflix (International)	co-production with Rai Fiction and Nickelodeon (pilot only)
World of Winx	2016–2017	Rai Gulp; Netflix (International)	co-production with Rai Fiction
Eccezionale veramente	2016–2017	La 7	co-production Colorado Film
44 Cats	2018–2021	Rai Yoyo; Nickelodeon (International)	co-production with Rai Ragazzi and Institute of Antoniano
Club 57	2019–2021	Rai Gulp; Nickelodeon (United States)	co-production with Nickelodeon Productions, Rai Ragazzi and Cinemat; Nickelodeon
Enjoy - Ridere fa bene	2020	RTI	
Fate: The Winx Saga	2021–2022	Netflix	co-production with Archery Pictures and Young Blood Productions
Summer & Todd: Happy Farmers	2021–2024	Rai Yoyo; Clan (Spain)	co-production with Motion Pictures
Pinocchio and Friends	2021–2024	Rai YoYo	co-production with Rai Ragazzi and Toonz Media Group
Mermaid Magic	2024–2026	Netflix	co-production with Bardel Entertainment
Gormiti: The New Era	2024–2026	Rai 2	co-production with Giochi Preziosi and Rai Kids
Winx Club: The Magic Is Back	2025–2026	Rai 2 Netflix	co-production with Rai Kids

=== Original comics ===
Comic	First issue	Last issue
Maya Fox	October 2008	2011

=== Films ===
Movie	Released	Distributor	Co-production
Tommy and Oscar: The Movie	2007	Miramax	Rai Cinema
Winx Club: The Secret of the Lost Kingdom	2007	01 Distribution (Italy); Paramount Home Entertainment (International)	Rai Cinema
Winx Club 3D: Magical Adventure	2010	Medusa Film; Paramount Pictures	Sky Cinema
Gladiators of Rome	2012	Medusa Film; Paramount Pictures	Mediaset Premium; Sky Cinema
Winx Club: The Mystery of the Abyss	2014	01 Distribution; Paramount Pictures	Rai Cinema
Tiro libero	2017	Linfa Crowd 2.0	
Classe Z	2017	Medusa Film	
The Girl in the Fog	2017	Medusa Film	
Daughter of Mine	2018	01 Distribution	Rai Cinema
My Big Gay Italian Wedding	2018	Medusa Film	
No Kids	2018	Medusa Film	
When Mom Is Away	2018	Medusa Film	
The Nest	2019	Medusa Film	
Into the Labyrinth	2019	Medusa Film	
Me contro Te - Il film: La vendetta del Signor S	2020	Warner Bros.	
Cambio tutto!	2020	Medusa Film; Amazon Prime Video	Colorado Film
When Mom Is Away... With the Family	2020	Medusa Film; Amazon Prime Video	Colorado Film
Me contro Te - Il film: Il mistero della scuola incantata	2021	Warner Bros.	
A Classic Horror Story	2021	Netflix	Colorado Film
My Name is Vendetta	2021	Netflix	Colorado Film
Me contro Te - Il film: Persi nel tempo	2022	Warner Bros.	
Il mammone	2022	Medusa Film	
Il pataffio	2022	01 Distribution	Rai Cinema; UMédia; Vivo Film
The Price of Family	2022	Netflix	Colorado Film
Tre di troppo	2023	Warner Bros.	
Me contro Te - Il film: Missione Giungla	2023	Warner Bros.	
Me contro Te - Il film: Vacanze in Transilvania	2023	Warner Bros.	
50km all'ora	2024	Eagle Pictures	Sony Pictures International Productions
The Tearsmith	2024	Netflix	Colorado Film

== Other divisions ==
Rainbow founded Tridimensional, a magazine publishing division, in 2004. A 3D animation division, Rainbow CGI, was formed in 2006. Rainbow also established Witty Toys, a toy division, in 2008.
