= Donato Carrisi =

Italian writer, screenwriter and director

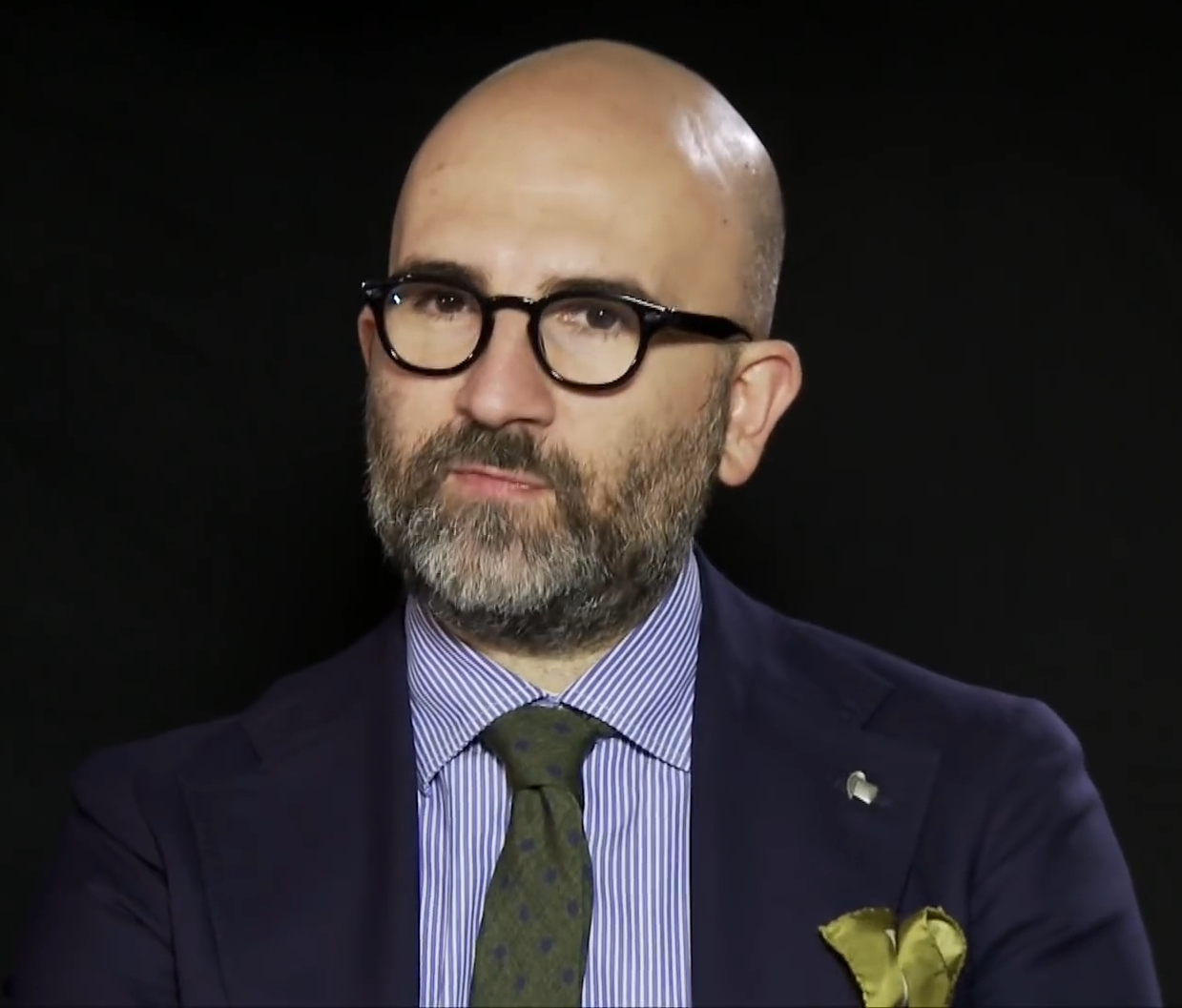
- Donato Carrisi in 2017
- Born: 25 March 1973 (age 53); Martina Franca, Apulia, Italy
- Occupations: Writer; film director; screenwriter

Donato Carrisi (born 25 March 1973) is an Italian writer, film director and screenwriter. He made his directorial debut with the film The Girl in the Fog (2017), based on his novel of the same name. He won a David di Donatello 2018 for Best New Director. It was one of the features of the 2019 Italian Film Festival in the United States, promoting Italian films in several cities.

== Awards ==
- Premio Bancarella (2009)
- David di Donatello (2018)

== Selected works ==
- The Whisperer (2009)
- The Lost Girls of Rome (2011)
- The Girl in the Fog (2015)
- The Hunter of the Dark (2016)
- Into the Labyrinth (2017)

== Filmography ==
- The Girl in the Fog (2017)
- Into the Labyrinth (2019)
- I Am the Abyss (2022)
