= Iginio Straffi =

Italian animator (born 1965)

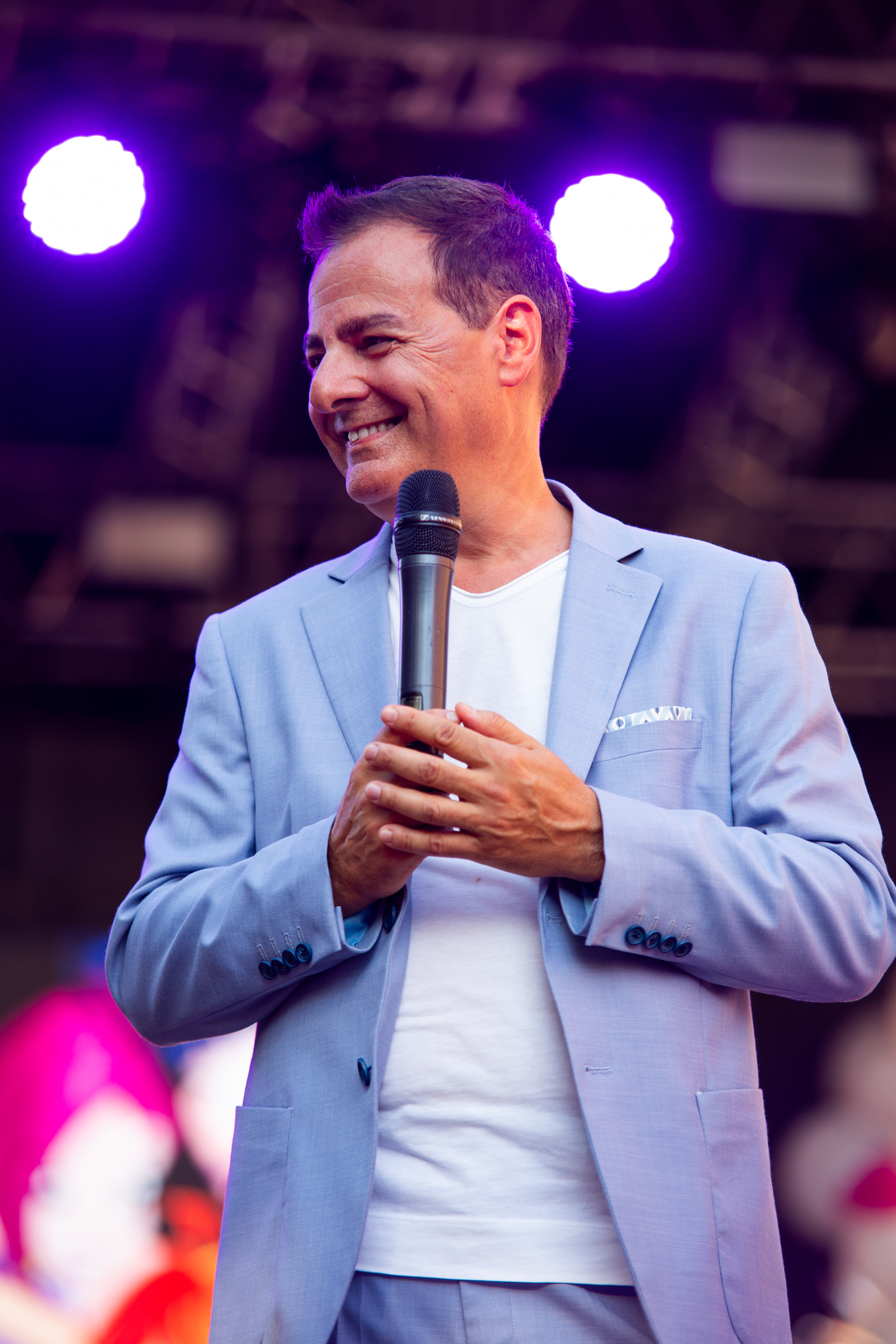
- Straffi in 2024
- Born: 30 May 1965 (age 61); Gualdo, Marche, Italy
- Education: University of Macerata
- Occupations: Animator; comics artist; director; founder and CEO of Rainbow S.p.A.
- Known for: Winx Club; Huntik: Secrets & Seekers; Club 57
- Spouse: Joanne Lee
- Children: 1
- Website: www.iginiostraffi.com

Iginio Straffi (born 30 May 1965) is an Italian animator and former comic book author. He is the founder and president of Rainbow SpA, which he co-owned alongside the American media company Paramount Global from 2011 until 2023. Straffi is the creator of the studio's animated series Winx Club and Huntik: Secrets & Seekers, as well as the co-creator of its comic book series Maya Fox.

While at university, Straffi published his first comic story in a 1985 issue of Tilt. He continued to work as a comic book illustrator through the 1990s, eventually drawing an issue of Sergio Bonelli Editore's Nick Raider series. In 1995, Straffi founded Rainbow with the assistance of Lamberto Pigini and Giuseppe Casali. The studio began with a capital of 10,000 euros, which was mostly used to purchase computers and software for digital design. Rainbow initially provided creative services for other companies until securing funds for original projects.

In 2004, Iginio Straffi's creation Winx Club premiered in Italy. The series became internationally successful and attracted the attention of the American media company Viacom, owner of Nickelodeon and Paramount Pictures. After a "long courtship," in February 2011 Viacom became a co-owner of Rainbow, purchasing 30% of the studio and leaving the remaining 70% to Straffi. The purchase was called "Straffi's most important agreement" by L'espresso, as it led to the worldwide distribution of Rainbow's shows by Paramount and Nickelodeon, as well as various co-productions. Straffi later took full ownership of the studio after buying the remaining stake from Paramount Global in January 2023. As of 2019, Straffi continues to work in creative roles at Rainbow, but he has shifted his focus from animation to live action. Among his first live-action works are Nickelodeon's Club 57 and Fate: The Winx Saga, an adaptation of Winx Club.

== Biography ==
=== Early life ===
Straffi was born on 30 May 1965 in Gualdo, in the Italian region of Marche. He had an interest in illustrating comic books from a young age, and by age seven, he started drawing his own comic stories. When he was eight years old, Straffi moved to the nearby city of Macerata. In high school, he often drew comic stories in his classmates' notebooks and participated in art competitions, such as one held by the comic magazine Totem. While he continued to develop his art skills, Straffi studied Modern Languages and Literatures at the University of Macerata. During his university years, he dated a foreign girl named Antonella who was raised in Italy by adoptive parents. Antonella told Straffi of her desire to meet her biological parents, which inspired Straffi to create Bloom – a character with a similar backstory. Bloom's personality was based on that of Straffi's wife, Joanne Lee. Straffi met Lee in 1997, during a trip to Lee's native Singapore, and they married several years later. Straffi and Lee have a daughter named Isotta.

=== Career ===
Straffi entered the professional comic book industry with a story in the 1985 issue of Tilt. He later collaborated on comic stories for the magazine Lanciostory and the Italian version of Skorpio. In 1989, Straffi was talent-scouted by Claudio Nizzi, creator of the Nick Raider comic book series. Nizzi brought him to work for the comic book's publishing house, Sergio Bonelli Editore. Straffi drew the Nick Raider October 1990 issue "Missione nel Bronx". His work was also occasionally featured in the Métal hurlant and Comic Art magazines. While he enjoyed illustration, Straffi's "dream job" was to turn his drawings into a cartoon, and he could not find an animation job in his home country.

External videos
- Iginio Straffi explains exposure sheets in animation. Straffi learned each stage of the animation production process before founding the Rainbow studio.

In 1992, Straffi left Sergio Bonelli Editore and moved to France for a storyboarding job at the Telcima animation studio. He was "bewildered" when he was offered the position, but in Straffi's words, it was "the turning point [he] was waiting for." Straffi worked on designs for the pilot episode of Valérian as well as a planned film adaptation of Roman de Renart. After becoming experienced with each stage of the animation production process, Straffi returned to Italy. With the financial assistance of Lamberto Pigini and Giuseppe Casali, Straffi founded Rainbow SpA in 1995 with €10,000. The money was mainly used to purchase computers and software for digital design.

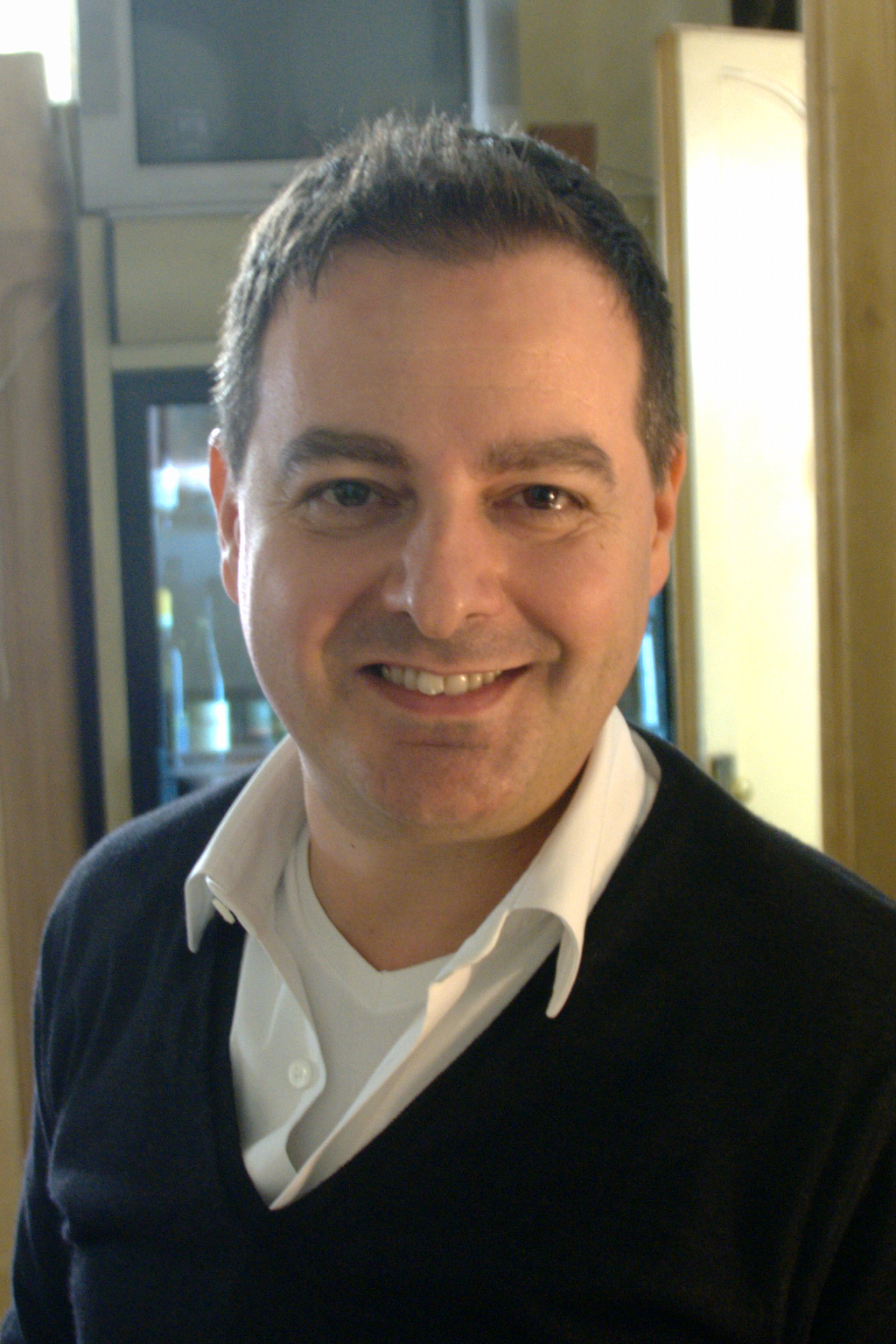
Straffi at the 2009 Lucca Comics and Games convention

Rainbow initially provided creative services for larger companies. Among the studio's first commissions were three minutes of animation in the film How the Toys Saved Christmas and the pilot for Les Armateurs' cartoon Belphégor. Rainbow eventually secured enough funds to produce its first original project, the Tommy and Oscar series of CD-ROMs and animations. In 2004, Straffi's creation Winx Club premiered on Italy's Rai 2. It became one of the network's highest-rated programs, with an average audience share of 17%. Straffi originally wrote the Winx Club plot to last no more than 78 episodes (three seasons). He decided to extend the series for an additional season in 2008, citing the show's increasing popularity.

Around this time, Winx Club's international success attracted the attention of the American media company Viacom, owner of Nickelodeon and Paramount Pictures. In February 2011, Viacom became a co-owner of Rainbow, purchasing 30% of the company and leaving the remaining 70% to Straffi. Viacom's entry into the company followed a "long courtship," and the terms of the US$83 million purchase were decided earlier in 2010. Viacom provides Straffi access to financial and studio resources that, according to L'espresso, "ensure the future of the Winx fairies, and of Straffi himself." L'espresso called the transaction "Straffi's most important agreement," as it led to the worldwide distribution of Rainbow's shows through Viacom's network of subsidiaries. Viacom's Nickelodeon studios have co-produced various projects with Rainbow, including additional seasons of Winx Club and Club 57 in 2019.

When asked by an interviewer in 2011 if he was "tired of" working on Winx Club, Straffi responded, "Let's just say I've moved onto other projects." His other creations include the horror comic book series Maya Fox (first published in 2008) and the animated television series Huntik: Secrets & Seekers (which premiered in 2009). In 2012, Straffi's first original animated film, Gladiators of Rome, opened in Italy. The movie was one of the most expensive Italian films made at the time, costing around $80 million (70 million euros) including marketing costs. The film performed poorly at the box office, earning about $10 million worldwide, which Straffi assumed was a result of Rainbow's lack of experience with cinema. Straffi also produced The Dark Side of the Sun, an animated documentary that premiered at the Rome International Film Festival in December 2011.

In 2019, Straffi stated that he intended to shift his focus to live action over animation; he felt "the move into live action completes [his] experience professionally." This followed Straffi's announcement that Winx Club would be adapted into a live-action series (Fate: The Winx Saga) geared towards the show's older fans, while the animated series would be completely redesigned for a much younger audience. As of 2019, Straffi serves as executive producer for Fate and as a producer for Nickelodeon's Club 57. The same year, Straffi commented on his near-decade of continued work with Nickelodeon, saying that "the know-how of Rainbow and the know-how of Nickelodeon are very complementary; the sensibilities of the Americans, with our European touch."

In January 2023, Straffi brought the remaining 30% stake of Rainbow SpA from Paramount Global, ending twelve years of co-ownership from Paramount Global, allowing full control of the studio's new projects. However, Paramount still retained copyrights to Nickelodeon-produced seasons of Winx Club.
