= Roberto Draghetti =

Italian voice actor (1960–2020)

- Born: 24 August 1960; Rome, Italy
- Died: 24 July 2020 (aged 59); Rome, Italy
- Occupations: Actor; voice actor
- Years active: 1985–2020
- Children: 1
- Relatives: Francesca Draghetti (sister)

Roberto Draghetti (24 August 1960 – 24 July 2020) was an Italian voice actor.

== Biography ==
Born in Rome and the older brother of actress and voice actress Francesca Draghetti, he started his career as a theatre actor in 1980 and became a voice actor and dubber ten years later. He performed the Italian-dubbed voices of Jamie Foxx, Noah Emmerich, Terry Crews and Idris Elba in some of their roles; other actors Draghetti dubbed included Mickey Rourke, Djimon Hounsou, Tyler Perry, Tyrese Gibson, Ray Stevenson and more.

Draghetti also worked in animation, giving his voice to characters such as Knut in Winx Club, Magnacat in Monster Allergy and providing the Italian-dubbed voices of Maurice in the Madagascar franchise, Stoick the Vast in the How to Train Your Dragon franchise, Chef Hatchet in Total Drama, Eddy in Ed, Edd n Eddy and various characters in The Simpsons.

== Death ==
Draghetti died in Rome of a sudden heart attack on 24 July 2020, one month before his 60th birthday. He was survived by his daughter, Malvina.

== Filmography ==
=== As actor ===
- Ascolta la canzone del vento - Drama/thriller film (2003) - The robber
- Provaci ancora prof! - TV series, episode 1x03 (2005)

=== Voice work ===
==== Animation ====
- Mutty in The Prince of Dinosaurs
- Knut (1st voice) in Winx Club
- Magnacat in Monster Allergy
- Gypsy in Bentornato Pinocchio
- Skranet in Virus Attack - Animated series (2010)
- Max in Sissi: The Young Empress [it]
- Drosselmeier in Pipi, Pupu and Rosemary in: The Mystery of the Stolen Notes [it]
- Capo/Primo Ufficiale dei Pirati (First Mate of the Pirates) in Leo da Vinci, Leo Da Vinci: Mission Mona Lisa
- Vitrio in Trash - La leggenda della piramide magica

===== Italian-dubbed animated roles =====
- Stoick the Vast in How to Train Your Dragon, How to Train Your Dragon 2, How to Train Your Dragon: The Hidden World, DreamWorks Dragons
- Maurice in Madagascar, Madagascar: Escape 2 Africa, Madagascar 3: Europe's Most Wanted, The Penguins of Madagascar
- Starscream in Transformers: Armada, Transformers: Energon, Transformers: Cybertron
- Sam Sheepdog and other characters in Looney Tunes and Merrie Melodies (since 1995)
- Humphrey the Bear and Devil Pluto in Mickey Mouse Works and House of Mouse
- Chernabog in House of Mouse and Mickey's House of Villains
- Officer Earl Devereaux in Cloudy with a Chance of Meatballs and Cloudy with a Chance of Meatballs 2
- Fat Tony (season 3-31), Lenny Leonard (season 8), Snake Jailbird (seasons 14-31), Superintendent Chalmers (seasons 17-31), narrator (episode 9.14), Tom Petty, "Weird Al" Yankovic, Tab Spangler, Rob Reiner, the colonel (ep. 18.5) and other roles in The Simpsons
- Charles Manson, John Postum, Panda, Rod Stewart and Chief Running Pinto in South Park (first Italian dub)
- Greg Corbin, Rusty Smith and Hulk Hogan in American Dad!
- Ebaloo, Karacka and Jude Heartphilia in Fairy Tale
- Kruncha, Hutchins and Nadakhan in Ninjago
- Jorgun and Balimbow in Gurren Lagann
- Evil Manta and Da Shrimp in The Little Mermaid
- Caterpillar and Benny the Cab in House of Mouse
- Lion and Louie the Mountain Lion in Mickey Mouse Works
- Billy Stumps and Gunther's father in Kick Buttowski: Suburban Daredevil
- Devil and Devil's Echo in Lissi und der wilde Kaiser
- Eddy in Ed, Edd n Eddy
- Experiment 627 in Lilo & Stitch: The Series
- Cyborg in Teen Titans (seasons 1-4)
- Terry Kimple in The Cleveland Show
- Dim in A Bug's Life
- Spike in Flushed Away
- Great Counselor Otomo in The Tale of the Princess Kaguya
- Master Thundering Rhino in Kung Fu Panda 2
- Kai in Kung Fu Panda 3
- Timandahaf in Asterix and the Vikings
- Marcel in Rio
- Ay in Mr. Peabody & Sherman
- Alley in Tom and Jerry: Spy Quest
- Ben in Pocahontas
- Gavin in Ice Age: Collision Course
- Ted in Finding Nemo
- Chef Hatchet in Total Drama
- James in The Princess and the Frog
- Bela in Hotel Transylvania 2
- Buster in Lady and the Tramp II: Scamp's Adventure
- Skeeter Valentine in Doug's 1st Movie
- Frank in The Ugly Duckling and Me!
- Cash in The Fox and the Hound 2
- Jasper in Storks
- Captain Typho in Star Wars: Clone Wars
- Russian Bear in Sing
- Rookery in The Little Vampire 3D
- Sauron in The Lego Batman Movie
- Lucky in The Nut Job
- Stabbington brothers in Rapunzel's Tangled Adventure
- Tenzin in The Legend of Korra
- Maxum Man in Sidekick
- Brutish Guard in The Hunchback of Notre Dame
- Bad Bill in Rango
- Prince Darkos in Arthur and the Invisibles
- Gyu Oh in Inuyasha (season 4 ep 13)
- Joe Tabootie in ChalkZone

==== Live action ====
- Radio announcer in Red Like the Sky

==== Italian-dubbed live action roles ====
- Robert Epps in Transformers, Transformers: Revenge of the Fallen, Transformers: Dark of the Moon
- Robbie Robertson in Spider-Man, Spider-Man 2, Spider-Man 3
- Mark Casey in Taken, Taken 2, Taken 3
- Volstagg in Thor, Thor: The Dark World, Thor: Ragnarok
- Hale Caesar in The Expendables, The Expendables 2, The Expendables 3
- Ben Grimm / Thing in Fantastic Four, Fantastic Four: Rise of the Silver Surfer
- Jim Paxton in Ant-Man, Ant-Man and the Wasp
- Marv in Sin City, Sin City: A Dame to Kill For
- Guy in Ted, Ted 2
- Dean 'MF' Jones in Horrible Bosses, Horrible Bosses 2
- Heinrich, Franco and Nakatomi (Guard) in Die Hard
- Ronald Pokelwalt, Prisoner 96G522 Carmen 'Chico' Guerra and Freakie in Oz (TV series)
- Charlie Bernard and Mr. Zisman in Alias
- Drew Bundini Brown in Ali
- Max Durocher in Collateral
- Henry Purcell in Stealth
- Sykes in Jarhead
- Ricardo Tubbs in Miami Vice
- Curtis Taylor Jr. in Dreamgirls
- Ronald Fleury in The Kingdom
- Nick Rice in Law Abiding Citizen
- Nathaniel Ayers in The Soloist
- Darryl Johnson in Due Date
- Vincent Downs in Sleepless
- Art in Project Power
- Vernon in Serving Sara
- Big Black Jack Latimore in Norbit
- Darrell in Harsh Times
- Agent 91 in Get Smart
- Louis Coltrane / Marlon in The Truman Show
- Charles Clusters in Windtalkers
- Gordo Hersch in Frequency
- Francis Tierney Jr. in Pride and Glory
- Bill in Fair Game
- Agustin Ramos / Moscow in Money Heist
- Ajihad in Eragon
- Arthur Koehler in J. Edgar
- Billy in Once Upon a Time in Mexico
- Dáin II Ironfoot in The Hobbit: The Battle of the Five Armies
- Dr. Gonzo in Fear and Loathing in Las Vegas
- Frank Nitti in Road to Perdition
- Happy Jack Mulraney in Gangs of New York
- Hugh Stamp in Mission: Impossible 2
- Jack Arons in Bridge to Terabithia
- Jack Bruno in Race to Witch Mountain
- Jeff in Dancer in the Dark
- Jonah Hex in Jonah Hex
- Juan in Moonlight
- King Ricou in Aquaman
- Llewelyn Moss in No Country for Old Men
- Professor James Arnold in Kingsman: The Secret Service
- Roger Dearly in 101 Dalmatians
- Toby Jay Wadenah in The Pledge
- Tom Chaney in True Grit
- Trumpkin in The Chronicles of Narnia: Prince Caspian
- Wiglaf in Beowulf

==== Italian-dubbed video games ====
- Fairburne in Sniper Elite V2, Sniper Elite 3, Sniper Elite 4
- Celebrimbor in Middle-earth: Shadow of Mordor
- Dick Marcinko in Rogue Warrior
- Keats in Folklore
- General Chase in Fallout 3
- Malcolm in Unreal Tournament 3
- Garrosh Malogrido in World of Warcraft, Heroes of the Storm
- Jack Vincent in Call of Duty: Black Ops III
- Soldier: 76 in Overwatch
- Mr. Braun in Steins;Gate
