= Leonardo Graziano =

Italian voice actor (born 1975)

- Graziano in 2023
- Born: November 15, 1975 (age 50); Capua, Italy
- Occupation: Voice actor

Leonardo Graziano (born November 15, 1975) is an Italian voice actor.

== Biography ==
Graziano, who voiced characters in franchises such as Winx Club and Monster Allergy, is well known for providing the Italian-dubbed voice of Naruto Uzumaki in Naruto and Naruto: Shippuden as well as dubbing Itsuki Koizumi in the Italian-language version of The Melancholy of Haruhi Suzumiya and Dan Kuso in the Italian version of the Bakugan series.

In Graziano's live action dubbing roles, he has most notably dubbed Jim Parsons as Sheldon Cooper in the Italian-language version of The Big Bang Theory. He works at dubbing studios in Rome and in Milan.

== Voice work ==
=== Animation ===
- Hector Sinistro in Monster Allergy
- Helia in Winx Club (season 4 and on), Winx Club: The Secret of the Lost Kingdom,Winx Club 3D: Magical Adventure
- Avvoltoio Capo in Leon the Lion
- Cream in 44 Cats
- Additional voices in Gladiators of Rome

==== Dubbing ====
- Dan Kuso in Bakugan Battle Brawlers, Bakugan Battle Brawlers: New Vestroia, Bakugan: Gundalian Invaders, Bakugan: Mechtanium Surge
- Naruto Uzumaki in Naruto, Naruto: Shippuden, Naruto the Movie: Ninja Clash in the Land of Snow
- Duffman (episode 15.15) and Jim Parsons in The Simpsons
- Coco / Kokoda in Yes! PreCure 5, Yes! PreCure 5 GoGo! and movies
- Wolfie in Barbie as the Princess and the Pauper
- Steve in The Ant Bully
- Lilo & Stitch
- Syaoran Li in Cardcaptor Sakura: The Movie
- Itsuki Koizumi in The Melancholy of Haruhi Suzumiya
- Neil Goldman in Family Guy
- Axel Blaze (2nd voice) in Inazuma Eleven
- Nagisa Shirai in Mermaid Melody Pichi Pichi Pitch
- Baby Taz in Baby Looney Tunes
- Beast Boy in Teen Titans
- Homeron the Great in Blue Dragon
- Tommy Gilligan in Codename: Kids Next Door
- Tony Parsons in The Cramp Twins
- Rudy Mookich in Pinky, Elmyra & the Brain
- Touta Matsuda in Death Note
- Eiji Kikumaru in The Prince of Tennis
- Kimiaki Shirai in Love Hina
- Killua Zoldyck in Hunter × Hunter
- Kei in Prétear
- Sarutobi Sasuke in Samurai Deeper Kyo
- Akim in Wheel Squad
- A.J. (Season 6-present) in The Fairly OddParents
- Joseph Anza in Fillmore!
- Lenny in The Polar Express
- Trent Mosely in Kamen Rider: Dragon Knight

=== Live action Italian-dub ===
- Sheldon Cooper in The Big Bang Theory
- Adult Sheldon Cooper in Young Sheldon
- Tyrese in Blue's Clues
- Drake Parker in Drake & Josh
- Francis of Assisi in Millions
- Rob in Feel the Noise
