= Shannon Settlemyre =

American actress

Shannon Settlemyre (born June 4, 1979, in New Hanover County, North Carolina) is an American voice actress and ADR voice director best known for providing the English voice of Lum in the Urusei Yatsura movies except movie 2. She mainly works at Coastal Studios and Swirl Films.

== Filmography ==
=== Anime ===
- Growing Up With Hello Kitty - Hello Kitty
- Urusei Yatsura film series - Lum, Ten
- Clamp School Detectives - Akira Ijunn
- Loveless - Yuiko Hawatari, Youji

=== Films ===
- Agent F.O.X. - Agent Fox, Longtail, Tily
- Pet Pals: Marco Polo's Code - Holly, Additional Voices

== Production credits ==
=== Voice director ===
- Loveless
- Urusei Yatsura film series
- Pet Pals: Marco Polo's Code
- Agent F.O.X.
