= List of Monster Allergy episodes =

The following is a list of episodes for animated television series Monster Allergy.

== Series overview ==
Season	Episodes	Originally released	
Season	Episodes	First released	Last released
Pilot		January 31, 2009	
1	26	September 23, 2006	January 20, 2008
2	26	December 27, 2008	August 18, 2009

== Episodes ==
=== Pilot (2009) ===
No.	Title	Original release date	Prod. code
0	"The Monsters Tamer"	January 31, 2009	100
A teaser episode showing Zick starting as a Tamer, while also explaining about the world of monsters. Note: Although this was aired during season 2, it is featured as a bonus episode for season 1.

=== Season 1 (2006–08) ===
No. overall	No. in season	Title	Italian air date	Spanish air date	Production code
1	1	"House of Monsters"	2005	2006	101
A new girl, named Elena Potato, arrives in Oldmill Village. She becomes "interested" in meeting Ezekiel Zick after hearing he was able to see monsters. When Purrcy, her cat, goes missing, Zick and Elena try to find him, but end up investigating the mysterious case of dogs being kidnapped around Oldmill Village... with the help of Zick's first supernatural being beyond the monster world... a ghost dog. Dom Power: Sight Dom, Voice Dom
2	2	"Monster Pod Under Oldmill"	November 25, 2006	October 27, 2007	102
Timothy thinks Elena is a threat for knowing their secret, so he unleashes Monster Pod, a carnivorous plant, to test Zick, but it behaves unexpected and starting to eat Oldmill Village. While chasing after the plant, Zick discovers Bibbur-Si, the Suspended City of monsters. Dom Power: Sight Dom, Voice Dom
3	3	"Cat in the Pot"	December 2, 2006	October 28, 2007	103
Zick and Elena learn that someone is kidnapping all the cats in Oldmill, including Purrcy, as well as Timothy. As they enter the inverted pyramid building and encounter the fearsome Androgorkas, they learn of the powerful Gorka, Magnacat, who is attempting to capture various Tutors, who look exactly like cats in his plot to take over Bibbur-Si. Dom Power: Sight Dom, Voice Dom, Energy Dom, Gesture Dom
4	4	"The Monster Next Door"	December 9, 2006	November 3, 2007	104
Zick is disappointed that his mother Greta is not coming to a parent-teacher day at school. Meanwhile, Magnacat plans to use the "Serum of Invulnerability", to turn humans into Androgorkas in his plot to take over Bibbur-Si, and to test Zick's abilities. Dom Power: Sight Dom, Voice Dom, Energy Dom, Gesture Dom
5	5	"The Pyramid of the Invulnerable" (Part 1)	September 23, 2006	November 4, 2007	105
Magnacat transforms many more people in Oldmill Village into Androgorkas. Zick and Timothy decide to intervene with the help of Trengingigan, the legendary Gorka hunter, to stop Magancat's plan. Elena gives a pair of sunglasses to help Zick cover his eyes, but instead the shades help intensify his powers. Dom Power: Sight Dom, Gesture Dom, Energy Dom Dom Gadget(s): Universal DomBox (first use), Zick's Sunglasses (first use)
6	6	"Magnacat" (Part 2)	September 30, 2006	November 10, 2007	106
Elena gets mad after being left out by Zick. Later, Magnacat makes a deal with Zick to help him in his plot to take over Bibbur-Si by telling him about his father at Dark Bay. During their showdown, when hopes of Zick winning are on the ropes, he discovers he can also summon ghosts with his Voice Dom, by summoning a Dark Phantom, Bristlebeard the pirate. In the end, Zick discovers that Greta, his mother, can see monsters, while Elena discovers that Timothy can speak. Dom Power: Voice Dom, Energy Dom, Gesture Dom Dom Gadget(s): Zick's Sunglasses
7	7	"Pirates' Hideout"	October 7, 2006	November 11, 2007	107
Zick and Elena try to find the treasure of Bristlebeard to save Greta's Flower shop. They venture to the Quicksilver River behind the waterfalls to find Bristlebeard's hideout. Later they learn about Bristlebeard's past and find something to save the shop. Dom Power: Voice Dom, Energy Dom Dom Gadget(s): Universal DomBox, Zick's Sunglasses
8	8	"Terror in the Deep"	October 14, 2006	November 17, 2007	108
When Zick and Elena go on a field trip to the aquarium, they meet Chumba Bagingi, a show-off monster, who escapes and attracts the terrible Dark Phantoms. Zick discovers he can use the Enviro Dom to breathe underwater. Dom Power: Sight Dom, Energy Dom, Enviro Dom Dom Gadget(s): Universal DomBox
9	9	"Canned Monster"	October 21, 2006	November 18, 2007	109
Zick and Elena meet Teddy Thaur, a tamer, and decide to go monster-hunting with him. Later, Zick finds out about the monster cellar and the Monster Tamers' Handbook. Dom Power: Sight Dom, Voice Dom, Energy Dom Dom Gadget(s): Universal DomBox, Dom Glove (introduced)
10	10	"Zick vs Zick"	October 28, 2006	November 25, 2007	110
Omnised and Omniquod escape from their DomBoxes by mind-controlling Elena, and cause trouble on Halloween. Later, Jeremy-Joth, one of the four Maximum Tutors, comes to restore order, and Timothy was forced to leave his duties for too many rule violations. Dom Power: Energy Dom, Sight Dom
11	11	"The Ancient Armory"	November 4, 2006	December 1, 2007	111
Elena's cousin, Lonzo gets his face messed up after being eaten by Bombo. So Zick and Elena travel to the Ancient Armory to find a cure. Inside the Armory, Zick is reunited with his miniature sized father, Zob, who shrank due to his battle with Magnacat. Meanwhile, Magnacat sends Omnised and Omniquod to use a Sharkworm, a sea monster, to attack them. Dom Power: Voice Dom, Energy Dom Dom Gadget(s): Zick's Sunglasses, Universal DomBox
12	12	"Witches Village" (Part 1)	November 11, 2006	December 2, 2007	112
Zick and Elena are trying to find a cure for Zob to return him to his normal size. Along with Teddy, they meet with Zick's Aunt Emely who turns out to be the leader of the Anguane Witches. She tells them how to return Zob to normal, but requires an exchange. Dom Power: Energy Dom, Sight Dom, Voice Dom Dom Gadget(s): Universal DomBox
13	13	"Mugalak!" (Part 2)	February 10, 2007	December 8, 2007	113
Zick, Elena, and Teddy head toward Drink Water Park to find Mugalak, a dragon monster, to capture his breath to restore Zob to normal. While in the cave, they are hunted by a Big Bonz Eater, a monster sent by Magnacat to destroy them. Later, the two find out that Teddy also wants the Breath of Mugalak to restore his own father, Terrence Thaur. Dom Power: Energy Dom, Sight Dom, Voice Dom Dom Gadget(s): Regular DomBox, Zick's Sunglasses
14	14	"Family Reunion"	February 17, 2007	December 9, 2007	114
The Zick and the Thaur Family head toward Port Reef to get reacquainted, and to transport Chumba Bagingi to Lardine's Detention Oasis. Meanwhile, Magnacat sends Ominsed and Omniquod to get his revenge on the Tamers. Dom Power: Voice Dom, Energy Dom, Sight Dom Dom Gadget(s): Zick's Sunglasses, Universal DomBox
15	15	"Claws"	February 24, 2007	December 15, 2007	115
Zick and Elena are doing a class project in Oldmill's Shipyard. Magnacat has Omnised and Omniquod turn Elena's pet rabbit, Puffy, into a were-rabbit to attack Zick and Elena. Meanwhile, Soup and Ford try to break up David and Annie. Dom Power: Energy Dom
16	16	"Bewitched Party"	TBA	December 16, 2007	116
After Zick and his father Zob reject an alliance with Emely. She sends her team of witches to kidnap Zick. Meanwhile, Elena is forced by her mother to have a pajama party with Mattie, Pattie, and Annie. Dom Power: Energy Dom, Enviro Dom Dom Gadget(s): Universal DomBox
17	17	"The Return of Magnacat"	March 3, 2007	December 22, 2007	117
Magnacat leaks some of his ooze from his capsule to poison the sewer system. Zob and Terrence decide to investigate, but when they don't come back the next day, Zick, Elena, and Teddy decide to go look for them in Magnacat's secret lair. Dom Power: Energy Dom, Enviro Dom, Sight Dom, Gesture Dom Dom Gadget(s): Universal DomBox, Zick's Sunglasses, Dom Glove, Tele-skates (first use)
18	18	"The General Inspector"	March 10, 2007	December 23, 2007	118
Zick decides to go visit Timothy in Bibbur-Si, but end up giving Jeremy some problems. The Maximum Tutors decides to conduct a general inspection of the Barrymore house. Dom Power: Energy Dom, Voice Dom, Enviro Dom Dom Gadget(s): Regular DomBox, Tele-skates, Dom Glove (first use)
19	19	"The Haunted Skyscraper"	March 17, 2007	December 29, 2007	119
Magnacat summons a Sphinx to scare the citizens and break the antennas off the building that supports the Suspended City. Jeremy and Zob investigate, while Zick and Elena do the same thing without their knowledge. Dom Power: Energy Dom, Gesture Dom, Sight Dom Dom Gadget(s): Regular DomBox
20	20	"Shoes for Bombo"	March 24, 2007	December 30, 2007	120
Bombo swallows Zick's tele-skates, and ends up teleporting everywhere. Zick and Elena find that he teleported himself in an old house that belonged to the Blacksmith Brothers, Theo And Tessa's old friends who are Dark Phantoms trying to eat Bombo. Meanwhile, Soup and Ford are planning to win a video contest in the same house. Dom Power: Energy Dom, Voice Dom, Sight Dom, Enviro Dom Dom Gadget(s): Tele-skates
21	21	"The Skeleton Army"	March 31, 2007	January 5, 2008	121
Zick and Elena try to get people to buy Zob's plant potion, which no one wanted because of its smelly odor. Meanwhile, Magnacat plans to take over Bibbur-Si by using an army of skeleton dinosaurs, by eliminating the Tamers first. When Elena is kidnapped by Omnised and Omniquad, Zick enlists Teddy's help to rescue her and foil Magnacat's evil scheme. Dom Power: Sight Dom, Energy Dom, Enviro Dom Dom Gadget(s): Zick's Sunglasses, Tele-skates
22	22	"The Secret Door"	January 6, 2008	TBA	122
After Omnised fails to obtain the Tamers' Handbook for Magnacat, Zick and Elena find a map in the Handbook about a secret door in the Ancient Armory. Along with Timothy, they go to investigate it. They later find the Hall of the Hundred Doors, and encounter the Flyvans, ancient winged monsters that were companions of Tamers. Dom Power: Sight Dom, Energy Dom, Voice Dom, Enviro Dom Dom Gadget(s): Universal DomBox, Tele-skates, Zick's Sunglasses, Dom Staff (first use)
23	23	"The Devourer" (Part 1)	January 12, 2008	TBA	123
Magnacat begins to arrange an alliance between the Dark Phantoms and the Gorkas in his plot to take over Bibbur-Si. He mind-controls Jeremy to capture Zick wanting to drain Zick's powers by using a machine, known as "The Devourer". Since Elena is sad about not being useful in serious situations, Greta gives her the gift of "Sight", the ability to see monsters to save Zick and Bibbur-Si. Dom Power: Energy Dom, Enviro Dom, Sight Dom Dom Gadget(s): Tele-skates
24	24	"The Last Tamer" (Part 2)	January 13, 2008	TBA	124
Magnacat plans to defeat the Tamers by using his powerfully armored weapon suit, the Gorka-droid. Meanwhile, Zick tries to become useful ever since he previously lost his powers, and meets a female Tamer named Lay Mamery. Later, when Magnacat attacks the Tamers in the Ancient Armory, Zick regains his powers. He and Elena go on the offensive to take down Magnacat and his Gorka-droid. Dom Power: Energy Dom, Sight Dom
25	25	"The Great Escape" (Part 1)	January 19, 2008	TBA	125
Magnacat decides to attack Bibbur-Si from above the army of Dark Phantoms in a blimp called the Vulture. The adult Tamers go to Bibbur-Si to help repel the invasion, while the young Tamers stayed at Zick's House. Elena, on the other hand, is grounded after her mother gets upset about her falling behind on her schoolwork. Later when Elena finishes her work, she, Zick, and the Barrymore House monsters jump into the Vulture to take it down, along with the Gorkas and the Dark Phantoms. Dom Power: Energy Dom, Sight Dom Dom Gadget(s): Universal DomBox, Dom Staff
26	26	"The Horn of Kong" (Part 2)	January 20, 2008	TBA	126
Magnacat becomes bankrupt due to having repeated failures to defeat the Tamers and taking over Bibbur-Si. He sends his new accomplice, Viziosed to get the Horn of Kong from the Ancient Armory, and plans to use it to control the Monster-Saur to defeat the Tamers. In the end, Zick succeeds in capturing Magnacat, as well as Viziosed & the Monster-Saur. Elena gets two twin siblings: Charlie and Violet, and declaring that the exile has ended and giving the monsters in the Barrymore House and the Tamers their freedom. Dom Power: Energy Dom, Sight Dom, Voice Dom Dom Gadget(s): Universal DomBox, Dom Staff

=== Season 2 (2008–09) ===
No. overall	No. in season	Title	Original release date	Prod. code
27	1	"Lord of the Witches"	December 27, 2008	201
A new enemy, the Moog Magister, the Lord of the Anguanes, is planning to take the monsters from the Crypt of the Ancient Armory. Zick meets a new Tamer named Bobby Clash, and Elena finds a baby Bombo she named Bombolo. Dom Power: Energy Dom, Enviro Dom Dom Gadget(s): Tele-skates, Dom Staff
28	2	"A Monster for Two"	December 28, 2008	202
A criminal named Scabby No-Luck escapes from prison, while a Grunt named Grood escapes from the Armory after Teddy accidentally release him. Zick, Elena and Bombo must capture Grood who is robbing the city, while Scabby's friends Bones and Roulette mistake him for their boss Scabby as Grood. Dom Power: Energy Dom, Enviro Dom, Sight Dom Dom Gadget(s): Tele-skates, Universal DomBox
29	3	"The Dragon's Awakening"	January 3, 2009	203
Pattie and Mattie are kidnapped by the Mugalak dragon, Mug-Mug in Drinkwater Park. Zick, Elena, along with Bombo and Bombolo try to rescue them, only to find that Mug-Mug is forced to capture them by two other Mugalaks, Ragador and Sulfurious. Dom Power: Energy Dom, Gesture Dom, Enviro Dom Dom Gadget(s): Hypno-Disk, Universal DomBox
30	4	"Trust Me!"	January 4, 2009	204
Zob and Greta prohibit Zick from being a Tamer due to his dropping grades at school. Zick secretly takes the Universal Dombox that still contains a Chamelion, which ends up inside Harvey's Supermarket. While trying to get the DomBox, they find out that Delia, one of the employees, is trying to get Elena's father fired from his job by stealing from his supermarket. Dom Power: Energy Dom, Voice Dom, Enviro Dom Dom Gadget(s): Universal DomBox
31	5	"A Kingdom for Bombolo"	January 9, 2009	205
Bombolo is taken away to Kamaludu-Si to be the crowned "Prince of the Baby Bombos". Sad that Elena is depressed because of Bombolo departure, Zick takes her and Bombo to visit the City of the Baby Bombos. They find out the place was deserted, and that the baby Bombos are being enslaved by a fashion Gingi named Karmilla, along with a Grugnock named Gorgo, to make them fetch Kamaludu bird feathers for her hat designs. Dom Power: Energy Dom, Enviro Dom Dom Gadget(s): Universal DomBox, 3-D Necklace
32	6	"The Fall of Barrymore House"	January 17, 2009	206
The Barrymore House is threatened to be demolished due to the discovery of the hidden sub cellar and its weak foundation. Zick investigates the sub cellar and finds out that the Sluggos, shapeshifting monsters thought to be captured centuries ago, are causing the damage in order to free their fellow monsters. Dom Power: Energy Dom, Enviro Dom, Sight Dom Dom Gadget(s): Tele-skates, Universal DomBox, Regular DomBox
33	7	"Moog's Revenge"	March 21, 2009	207
While Zick and his friends are playing basketball at school, Moog Magister orders Emely to pour a Metamorphic potion, one that only affects Tamers, into the kids' water bottles to turn Zick into an ancient and dangerous monster called a Bomberbang, to be hunted down and captured by the other Tamers. Zick then turns to Elena, the only person who believes that he's the monster, and together they go to the Anguanes' Lair to create an antidote to turn him back to normal. In the end, Zick writes a letter and confessed to Elena that he loves her, only for it to be eaten by Bombolo. Dom Power: Energy Dom, Voice Dom Dom Gadget(s): Universal DomBox, Regular DomBox
34	8	"Pirates of the Unicorn"	April 11, 2009	208
Zick and Elena are taking a relaxing day at the beach, until they encounter the pirate ship, the Unicorn, now run by a new captain name Baffolasco, who had been plundering other boats on the sea. Zick and Elena, along with Bombo, venture to the Quicksilver Cave to find Bristlebeard and ask for help to stop and reclaim the Unicorn. Dom Power: Voice Dom, Energy Dom
35	9	"The Snowman"	April 18, 2009	209
Zick is in charge of the house when his parents are stuck at the Armory, and Timothy is stuck in Bibbur-Si, due to the snowy weather. A Dark Tamer named Hector Sinistro sabotages Zick's tele-skates to turn his entire body into ice, shrinks him using a shrink ray that he stole from Uzka, and kidnaps him by putting him in a snow globe so that he can get his long-awaited revenge against Zick's father. Dom Power: Energy Dom, Enviro Dom, Voice Dom Dom Gadget(s): Crystallizator, Tele-skates
36	10	"The Island Rebels"	January 24, 2009	210
Two new detainees, Lali Bergingigonz and Paruto Porro escape the Barrymore Detention Oasis, away to Foggy Island. Zick and Elena, along with Bombo are sent to capture them and bring them back. They find a secret Oasis led by a Bobak name Riz Brandak along with a bunch of other escaped monsters, and encounter a Purpidoch, a vicious spider-like sea monster that surrounds the island. Dom Power: Voice Dom, Energy Dom, Enviro Dom Dom Gadget(s): Radio-Worm
37	11	"Milk and Biscuits"	March 14, 2009	211
Zick, Teddy and Bobby try to get a potion to remove their pimples before Lay's birthday party after eating Brim-Bombak special dessert. Meanwhile, Elena accidentally feeds Bombolo milk and biscuits after sunset, and causing to produce evil pimple clones. Zick, Elena, and Bombo, along with Teddy and Bobby, try to stop them before they reproduce more pimple clones by using the same potion to remove their pimples, and take over the world. Dom Power: Energy Dom, Gesture Dom, Enviro Dom Dom Gadget(s): Universal DomBox
38	12	"Sinistro's Circus"	July 11, 2009	212
When Elena encounters a Bobak that escapes from being kidnapped and learns that some of the monsters in Bibbur-Si were starting to go missing, Zick and Elena investigate. They find a circus caravan and figure out that Hector Sinistro is kidnapping monsters and making them perform for his circus. Along with Bombo, they make a plan to stop Sinistro and to free the imprisoned monsters. Dom Power: Energy Dom, Enviro Dom Dom Gadget(s): Disco-Monster, Universal DomBox
39	13	"The Tamers' Tournament" (Part 1)	May 30, 2009	213
The Tamers have a tournament to determine who wins the prestigious Armory Cup. Teddy was caught cheating, and was disqualified, but while doing his punishment, he is suddenly attacked. All the exits of the Armory were sealed off, and someone attacks Jeremy, leaving him unconscious. Zick, Elena, Lay, Bobby and Teddy decide to take the secret exit leave the Armory, but they were soon attacked by Viziosed. Zick later learns that everything was plotted by his old enemy, Magnacat. Dom Power: Energy Dom, Enviro Dom Dom Gadget(s): Dom Staff, Densifier, Tele-skates
40	14	"The Invisible Enemy" (Part 2)	May 2, 2009	214
After Magnacat takes control of the Ancient Armory, Zick escapes to Bibbur-Si to get help of Trengingigan. They go back to the Armory to meet up with Elena, Lay, Bobby and Teddy, who survived the encounter with Viziosed. They team up to organize a plan that will free the adult Tamers, and defeat Magnacat and his minions, once and for all. Dom Power: Energy Dom, Enviro Dom Dom Gadget(s): Densifier, Tele-skates, Universal DomBox, Magnacat's DomBox
41	15	"Blackout"	June 6, 2009	215
Big Burg is celebrating their three hundred years of its foundation by releasing fireworks at midnight. Jeremy orders Zick, Elena and Bombo, along with the young Tamers to stop a group called the "Darkness Guardians" from ruining to celebration by blacking out the city to cause a confusion, stealing the fireworks and using them attack the suspended city. Dom Power: Energy Dom, Enviro Dom, Voice Dom Dom Gadget(s): Tele-skates, Universal DomBox
42	16	"The Great Champion"	June 13, 2009	216
Bombo sadly goes back to Bibbur-Si after causing some mischief in the Ancient Armory. After not hearing from him in two weeks, Zick and Elena goes to Big Burg to look for him, and found out that he is wrestling as the "Almighty King" in the Skeleton Arena. They learn that Hector Sinistro is controlling and using him to make profit for his own, and they decide to ask Bim Bombak to help them to bring Bombo back. Dom Power: Energy Dom Dom Gadget(s): Sinistro's Cane
43	17	"Pandora's Box"	May 23, 2009	217
At the museum, Charles Carpintrain has discovered a giant vase that he states is Pandora's Box, and proclaimed he will open it. After careful observation, Zob and Timothy discover that the vase is actually an ancient DomBox containing a Roug, an ancient pterodactyl-like monster that steals souls. Zick, Elena, and Bombo decide to steal the vase to prevent the monster's release. They meet another Tamer named Costas Daniel La Bun, who offers to bring back the vase to Greece after saying Carpintrain actually stole the vase from his cellar. Dom Power: Energy Dom, Enviro Dom Dom Gadget(s): Tele-skates, Universal DomBox
44	18	"The Potion of Fear"	June 28, 2009	218
Emely creates a fear formula and plans to release it on Halloween. Zick and Elena are exposed to the formula but Bombo's cold kept him from inhaling it. Bombo helps Zick and Elena find the cure and stop the Anguanes before the formula is spread throughout Oldmill Village. Dom Power: Energy Dom
45	19	"The Rebellion of the Shadows"	June 27, 2009	219
After noticing shadows are being misplaced to other people's shadows, Zick and Elena decide to investigate and discover that Hector Sinistro is making a shadow army to attack the Armory to obtain his stolen treasure. Being discovered, Hector removes Zick's memories of knowing where his treasure is hidden, by stealing his shadow. Elena, along with Theo, Tessa and Bombo decide to find Sinistro and get everyone's shadows back, including Zick's. Dom Power: Energy Dom, Sight Dom Dom Gadget(s): Sinistro's Cane
46	20	"The Ghosts of the Forest"	August 18, 2009	220
When Bombo eats too much candy and accidentally destroys the alliance contract with the Bobaks, he was banish by the Maximum Tutors form Bibbur-Si until he loses some weight. Zick and Elena decides to help him by go camping at Drink Water Park to get exercise and a diet. They met some peaceful shamans to help the ghosts in the forest, and turns out to be Dark Phantoms that were smuggling to scare people and to steal supplies. Dom Power: Energy Dom
47	21	"The Bottomless Pit"	July 13, 2009	221
When class gets cancelled due to a missing subway train that was carrying their teacher, Ms. Swift, Zick and Elena, along with Bombo investigate the subway tracks and find that a Megarock, a giant stone worm monster, has eaten the train. They later learn that Hector Sinistro is using the worm monster to attack the Ancient Armory from underneath. Dom Power: Voice Dom, Energy Dom, Sight Dom, Enviro Dom Dom Gadget(s): Sinistro's Cane
48	22	"Show Must Go On"	July 20, 2009	222
Chumba Bagingi escapes his DomBox with the helps his lover, Chumbamba. When they see Zick and Elena rehearsing for the play The Phantom of the Opera, they decide to join and help the play to attract themselves to people. Zick and Elena try to capture them, and while stopping someone that is sabotaging the play by acting as the phantom. Dom Gadget(s): Universal DomBox
49	23	"Brother Vampire"	July 27, 2009	223
When hearing that there's a vampire roaming in Oldmill Village, Zick and Elena investigate. When tracking him down to their school, they learn that their principal has a brother name Bowleg who is actually a vampire that wanted to find an Anguane witch to cure him. They decide to help him by going to Emely's house to make an antidote to make him human again. Dom Power: Energy Dom, Voice Dom, Enviro Dom
50	24	"Back Home"	August 3, 2009	224
After Zick suffers a bad day at the Ancient Armory, he goes home on a bus and falls asleep. When he wakes up, he is shocked to learn that he is now in the future, and that Magnacat and his Gorkas had taken over Big Burg and all the other Tamers were captured. When he's fighting the Gorkas, he later realizes that it was all a fake illusion created by Moog Magister and the Anguanes to get him to lead them to the Ancient Armory crypt. Dom Power: Energy Dom, Enviro Dom Dom Gadget(s): Universal DomBox
51	25	"The House in the Swamp"	August 18, 2009	225
Zick, Teddy and Bobby argue each other which one of them is the best Tamer to capture the Polipolipo, a humongous swamp monster, that Jeremy decides to give them a test of courage by going to the swamp to an old house full of Dark phantoms and to which one of them can capture a Polipolipo first. Unknown to them, Jeremy plans to teach them a lesson by bringing Elena, Lay and Bombo to trick them by pretending to be Dark Phantoms in the old house. However, their plans backfired when they encounter real Dark phantoms. When Zick, Teddy and Bobby found out, they decide to summon the Polipolipo to save them. Dom Power: Energy Dom, Voice Dom Dom Gadget(s): Densifier, Universal DomBox, Scare Tamers Kit, Monster Decoy
52	26	"The Hundred and First Door"	August 18, 2009	226
The Anguanes attempt to please Moog Magister by setting up a party to celebrate his 301st birthday, but he ends up destroying everything for being frustrated not having the boxed monsters from the Ancient Armory for his potion and spells. Emely then brings Hector Sinistro, who can help him get into the Armory by unlocking the Hundred and First Door, which is located inside the volcano, along with the key to it. Meanwhile, the Tamers are having party to celebrate the end of the school year in the 100 Door Square, but it is short lived when the Hundred and First Door opens, and releases the lava from the inside of the volcano. Zick tries to stop Moog Magister from capturing Bombolo for eating his magical bag that contains all the DomBoxes in the crypt, and to stop Sinistro when he acquires a lost weapon of his, the ZetaDom stick, a Dom weapon used to control all monsters to his will. In the end, when Moog destroys the key to the 101st door, Zick rescues Bombolo and the shrunken boxed monsters from him. Moog then perishes by falling into the lava when the door closes, and Sinistro's ZetaDom stick overloads his energy, and explodes, turning him into a tiny monster, and Bombolo's pet. But with the Armory destroyed by the lava, a new life begins for Zick and the Tamers as the boxed monsters will now be kept in the sub-cellar of the Barrymore House, and that the Tamers will always answer the call for help whenever a monster problem resurfaces. Dom Power: Energy Dom, Enviro Dom, Voice Dom Dom Gadget(s): ZetaDom Stick, 101st door Key
