= List of Disney programs broadcast in Italy =

This is a list of the Disney animated series broadcast in Italy.

== # ==
- The 7D 24+ episodes, 2014
- 101 Dalmatians 65 episodes, 1997

== A ==
- Adventures of the Gummi Bears 95 episodes, 1985
- Aladdin 86 episodes, 1994
- American Dragon: Jake Long 52 episodes, 2005

== B ==
- Bonkers 65 episodes, 1993
- Braceface 78 episodes, 2001
- Brandy & Mr. Whiskers 39 episodes, 2004
- Buzz Lightyear of Star Command 62 episodes, 2000

== C ==
- Chip 'n Dale Rescue Rangers 65 episodes, 1989

== D ==
- Darkwing Duck 91 episodes, 1991
- Dave the Barbarian 22 episodes, 2004
- Dinosaurs 65 episodes, 1991
- Doug 117 episodes, 1991
- DuckTales 100 episodes, 1987

== E ==
- The Emperor's New School 52 episodes, 2006

== F ==
- Fillmore! 25 episodes, 2005
- Fish Hooks 46+ episodes, 2010

== G ==
- Gargoyles 78 episodes, 1994
- Goof Troop 79 episodes, 1992

== H ==
- Hercules 65 episodes, 1998
- House of Mouse 53 episodes, 2001

== J ==
- Jake and the Never Land Pirates 43+ episodes, 2011
- Jungle Cubs 21 episodes, 1996

== K ==
- Kim Possible 87 episodes, 2002
- Kick Buttowski: Suburban Daredevil 52 episodes, 2010

== L ==
- The Legend of Tarzan 39 episodes, 2001
- Lilo & Stitch 65 episodes, 2003
- The Little Mermaid 31 episodes, 1992

== M ==
- The Buzz on Maggie 21 episodes, 2005
- Handy Manny 42+ episodes, 2006
- Marsupilami 13 episodes, 1993
- Mickey Mouse Clubhouse 90+ episodes, 2006
- Monster Allergy 57 episodes, 2005
- My Friends Tigger & Pooh 38 episodes, 2007

== N ==
- The New Adventures of Winnie the Pooh 83 episodes, 1988

== P ==
- PB&J Otter 65 episodes, 1998
- Pepper Ann 65 episodes, 1997
- Phineas and Ferb 222 episodes, 2007
- The Book of Pooh 36 episodes, 2001
- The Proud Family 53 episodes, 2001

== Q ==
- Quack Pack 39 episodes, 1996

== R ==
- Recess 84 episodes, 1997

== S ==
- Special Agent Oso 62 episodes, 2008
- Star vs. the Forces of Evil 13+ episodes 2015

== T ==
- TaleSpin 65 episodes, 1990
- Timon and Pumbaa 168 episodes, 1995

== W ==
- Wander Over Yonder 79 episodes, 2013
- The Wuzzles 13 episodes, 1985
- W.I.T.C.H. 52 episodes, 2004

== See also ==
- Walt Disney Company
- The Walt Disney Company Italy
