= Davide Garbolino =

Italian voice actor, dubbing director and television presenter

- Born: Cirié, Italy
- Occupations: Actor, voice actor, dubbing director, television presenter
- Years active: 1989–present

Davide Garbolino is an Italian voice actor, dubbing director, and television presenter.

He is well known for providing the voice of the protagonist Ash Ketchum in the Italian-language version of the anime series Pokémon, Michelangelo in the first three series of Teenage Mutant Ninja Turtles, Plucky Duck and young Donald Duck in the Italian dubs of Tiny Toon Adventures and DuckTales, respectively, and Nobita in Doraemon. He is also the current Italian voice of Bugs Bunny since 2007, replacing Massimo Giuliani.

== Voice work ==
- Tiramolla Adventures - animated series (1992) - Caucciù
- Prezzemolo - animated series (2002) - Various characters
- Foot 2 Rue - Animated series (2005-2009) - Lucifero
- Water & Bubbles - animated series (2007-2021) - Chris Carugati
- PopPixie - animated series (2011) - Fixit
- Calimero - animated series (2014) - Calimero and Capo Cocò
- L'arte con Matì e Dadà - animated series (2014) - Dadà
- Lungomare - short film (2015)
- Leo Da Vinci: Mission Mona Lisa - animated film (2017), Leo Da Vinci - animated series (2019) - Francis
- Bosco vivo. L'arte della selvicoltura - documentary (2018)
- Nefertina sul Nilo - animated series (2021) - Tanfenaton
- Pasolini - Cronologia di un delitto politico - documentary (2022)
- Degnità: aforismi, massime, postulati di una vita - short film (2024)

=== Dubbing ===
==== Animation ====
- Plucky Duck and Lil' Sneezer in Tiny Toon Adventures
- Konkichi in Dragon Ball
- Gohan (older) in Dragon Ball Z, Gohan in Dragon Ball GT, Dragon Ball Z: Return of Cooler (2nd Italian dub), Dragon Ball Z: Wrath of the Dragon (second Italian dub), Dragon Ball Super
- Ash Ketchum in Pokémon, Pokémon: The First Movie, Pokémon: The Movie 2000, Pokémon 3: The Movie, Pokémon 4Ever, Pokémon Heroes, Pokémon: Jirachi Wish Maker, Pokémon: Destiny Deoxys, Pokémon: Lucario and the Mystery of Mew, Pokémon Ranger and the Temple of the Sea, Pokémon: The Rise of Darkrai, Pokémon: Giratina and the Sky Warrior, Pokémon: Arceus and the Jewel of Life, Pokémon: Zoroark: Master of Illusions, Pokémon the Movie: Black—Victini and Reshiram and White—Victini and Zekrom, Pokémon the Movie: Kyurem vs. the Sword of Justice, Pokémon the Movie: Genesect and the Legend Awakened, Pokémon the Movie: Diancie and the Cocoon of Destruction, Pokémon the Movie: Hoopa and the Clash of Ages, Pokémon the Movie: Volcanion and the Mechanical Marvel, Pokémon the Movie: I Choose You!, Pokémon the Movie: The Power of Us
- Jared in Pokémon Chronicles
- Ryou Shirogane in Tokyo Mew Mew
- Daniel Witwicky in Transformers
- Cancer in Transformers: Super-God Masterforce
- Blurr in Transformers Animated
- Raf Esquivel in Transformers: Prime
- Dick Grayson/Robin in Batman: The Animated Series, The Batman
- Tim Drake/Robin in The New Batman Adventures
- Syrus Truesdale in Yu-Gi-Oh! GX
- Lester in Yu-Gi-Oh! 5D's
- Reginald Kastle in Yu-Gi-Oh! Zexal
- Nobita Nobi in Doraemon (1979 anime) (second dub), Doraemon: Nobita in Dorabian Nights, Doraemon: Nobita and the Kingdom of Clouds
- Brainy Smurf in Smurfs: The Lost Village
- Miki Kaoru in Revolutionary Girl Utena
- Omi in Xiaolin Showdown
- Tucker Foley in Danny Phantom
- Yonkuro Hinomaru in Dash! Yonkuro
- Dewey in Nurse Angel Ririka SOS
- Alden Jones in Braceface
- Bert Raccoon in The Raccoons
- Connor in Cubix
- Digit in Cyberchase
- Junior in Hairy Scary
- Dine in The Twisted Whiskers Show
- Josh in Creepschool
- Dilton Doiley in Archie's Weird Mysteries
- Fuyuki Takeichi in School Rumble
- Tommy Cadle and Clinton Fillmore Jefferson XIII in Pet Alien
- Baron Letloy in Bakugan Battle Brawlers: New Vestroia
- Lazlo in Camp Lazlo
- Rodney J. Squirrel in Squirrel Boy
- Timothy Platypus in Taz-Mania
- Andropov in Blue Dragon
- Yusuke Urameshi in YuYu Hakusho
- Tororo in Keroro Gunso
- Tak in Tak and the Power of Juju
- Matt Martin/Kewl Breeze in Zevo-3
- Manny Rivera/El Tigre in El Tigre: The Adventures of Manny Rivera
- Harvey Kinkle in Sabrina: The Animated Series, Sabrina's Secret Life
- Idate Morino in Naruto
- Obito Uchiha in Naruto: Shippuden
- Jun Kawanakajima in Ultra Maniac
- Axel Blaze (First voice) in Inazuma Eleven
- Victor Blade in Inazuma Eleven GO
- Chivil in Dr. Slump (second dub, 1980/86 series)
- Jean Roque Raltique in Nadia: The Secret of Blue Water (First and second dubs)
- Kyōsuke Kasuga in Kimagure Orange Road (First dub)
- Michelangelo in Teenage Mutant Ninja Turtles (2003 TV series)
- Tsubute in Ninja Scroll: The Series
- Jimmy Two-Shoes in Jimmy Two-Shoes
- Petrie in The Land Before Time VII: The Stone of Cold Fire
- Hiroshi Naganuma in Mizuiro Jidai
- Kaoru Yamazaki in Welcome to the N.H.K.
- Keswick in T.U.F.F. Puppy
- Sora in Beyblade: Metal Fusion
- Blooter in Poppets Town
- Joshi in GoGoRiki
- Piggley Winks in Jakers! The Adventures of Piggley Winks
- Jay in Machine Robo Rescue
- Koza (Second voice) in One Piece
- Tobio in One Piece: The Movie
- Mobambi in Chopper's Kingdom on the Island of Strange Animals
- Touma in One Piece: Norowareta Seiken
- Alec/Alexander O. Howell in Ceres, Celestial Legend
- Handy in The Adventures of Chuck and Friends
- Bugs Bunny in Bugs Bunny's Valentine (2010 redub), The Looney Tunes Show, Looney Tunes: Rabbits Run, Wabbit: A Looney Tunes Production / New Looney Tunes, Looney Tunes Cartoons, Space Jam: A New Legacy, Bugs Bunny Builders, Tiny Toons Looniversity, Coyote vs. Acme
- Pablo DaVinci in The DaVincibles
- Shinobu Saruwatari in Godannar
- Shinichi Kudo in Detective Conan, Detective Conan: The Time-Bombed Skyscraper
- Dax in Monsuno
- Shun Imagawa in Princess Comet
- Mookee in Redakai: Conquer the Kairu
- Impossible Man in Fantastic Four: World's Greatest Heroes
- Mame in A Letter to Momo
- Kai in Zambezia
- Mikeru in Mermaid Melody Pichi Pichi Pitch
- Young Donald Duck in DuckTales (2017 TV series)
- Guillermo in Victor and Valentino
- Drew Yerface in ChalkZone

==== Video games ====
- Abu in Hollywood Monsters
- Scott Shelby (child) in Heavy Rain
- Rusty Pete in Ratchet & Clank Future: Tools of Destruction, Ratchet & Clank Future: Quest for Booty
- Marty in Mafia II
- Sasha in Metro 2033
- Seeing Farther in Call of Juarez: Bound in Blood
- Hugo and additional voices in Skylanders: Spyro's Adventure, Skylanders: Giants
- Axel Blaze in Inazuma Eleven 2
- Nunu (Italian) in League of Legends
- Astro Boy in Astro Boy: The Video Game

==== Muppet dubbed productions ====
- Elmo in Elmo's World (Il Mondo di Elmo)

==== Live action shows and films ====
- David Tom and Ryan Brown in The Young and the Restless
- Max Nickerson in Guiding Light
- Nevel Papperman in iCarly
- Abed Nadir in Community
- Billy Harlan in Goosebumps
- Dwane "Excess" Wilson in USA High
- Gem in Power Rangers RPM

== Work as dubbing director ==
- Guru Guru Town Hanamaru-kun
- Whistle!
- School Rumble:2nd Semester
- Poppets Town
