= Pet Pals in Windland =

2014 animated film

- Theatrical release poster
- Italian: Cuccioli - Il paese del vento
- Directed by: Sergio Manfio
- Screenplay by: Sergio Manfio; Francesco Manfio; Anna Manfio; Davide Stefanato
- Production companies: Gruppo Alcuni; LuxAnimation
- Distributed by: 01 Distribution
- Release date: 27 March 2014
- Running time: 80 minutes
- Countries: Italy; Luxembourg
- Language: Italian
- Box office: $356,152

Pet Pals in Windland (Italian: Cuccioli - Il paese del vento), also known as Eggy in the U.S. release, is a 2014 Italian-language animated children's film directed by Sergio Manfio from a screenplay by Sergio, Francesco Manfio, Anna Manfio and Davide Stefanato. Based on the Pet Pals animated television series, it is the second feature-length film based on the series after Pet Pals: Marco Polo's Code (2010). Pet Pals in Windland was produced by Gruppo Alcuni, and co-produced by the Luxembourgish LuxAnimation. It was released in Italian cinemas on 27 March 2014.

== Plot ==
The Crow Witch plots to steal a Spinwheel that is the source of the wind of the town of Puff, which the Spinwheel also powers the town.

Meanwhile, a turtle who keeps an eye on the Spinwheel shares to the Pet Pals about how he adopted Nameless, and because the latter was speechless, the former provided Nameless a placard containing a robot friend. That night, the Crow Witch sneaks into Nameless' placard room to steal his robot placard.

The next day, the Pet Pals learn of the stealing of the placard, and visit the wind keeper, where the pets explain that they discovered a feather in the scene. The wind keeper reveals to Nameless that the latter's mother was abducted by the Crow Witch before Nameless was even born. The Crow Witch arrives, kidnaps the Wind Keeper, and steals the Spinwheel to power a giant robot that resembles Nameless. Without the Spinwheel, the town of Puff loses power. The Crow Witch then abducts Diva and Top Hat, one of the members of the Pet Pals.

Meanwhile, King Cyclone, the king of Puff, imprisons the other Pet Pals after believing the group are the culprits behind the robot. Nameless only escapes, and sneaks into the crow witch's cave, where he finds her launching machines to terrorize Puff. He then sneaks aboard the Nameless robot to confront her, with the other Pet Pals, having escaped prison, following her. They all rescue the wind keeper, Diva, and Top Hat, eject the Crow Witch from the robot, and take back the Spinwheel, disabling her machines. The citizens then repair Puff to its normal slate. Meanwhile, the Crow Witch is arranging another plan back at her cave.

== Voice cast ==
=== Italian version ===
Original voice actors:

- Monica Ward as Olly (Holly)
- Laura Lenghi as Diva
- Paolo Lombardi as Portatile (Moby)
- Edoardo Nevola as Cilindro
- Gigi Rosa as Pio
- Paola Giannetti as Maga Cornacchia (the Crow Witch)
- Gerolamo Alchieri as Ambrogio (Ambrosio)
- Enrico Di Troia as Cuncun
- Franco Mannella as Canbaluc
- Stefano Mondini as Custode del Vento (Wind Keeper)
- Nanni Baldini as Re Ciclone and Coda (King Cyclone and Tail)

=== English dubbing ===
The following is the voice cast of the English dubbed version:

- Eileen McNamara as Crow Witch
- Angela Mulligan as Holly
- Anthony Salerno as Moby
- Christopher R. Burns as Pio
- Melissa Hope as Diva
- Bill Timoney as King Cyclone and Tail
- Michael Colasurdo as Top Hat
- Joe Rodriguez as Wind Keeper
- Bill Rogers as Cuncun
- Richard M. Davidson as Ambrosio
- Ken Spassione Jr. as Canbaluc
- Gary Martin as Kite

== Release ==
Pet Pals in Windland was released in Italian cinemas on 27 March 2014 by 01 Distribution. It had an opening weekend gross of $198,543, finishing with a worldwide box office gross of $356,152. It received positive reception for its ecological messages, such as the importance of renewable energy sources.
