= Leo Da Vinci: Mission Mona Lisa =

2018 children's animated adventure film

- Film poster
- Directed by: Sergio Manfio
- Written by: Sergio Manfio; Francesco Manfio
- Produced by: Fabio Testa
- Edited by: Umberto Barison
- Music by: Marco Fedalto
- Production companies: Gruppo Alcuni; Warsaw Movie Home
- Release date: 11 January 2018
- Running time: 85 minutes
- Countries: Italy; Poland
- Language: Italian
- Box office: $2,594,932

Leo Da Vinci: Mission Mona Lisa (Italian: Leo da Vinci - Missione Monna Lisa) is a 2018 3D computer-animated adventure film directed by Sergio Manfio.

== Premise ==
The film follows a fictionalised young Leonardo da Vinci, who goes on an adventure alongside four friends in order to find a sunken treasure to save crush Lisa from bankruptcy and a forced marriage.

== Cast ==
=== Italian ===
- Alex Polidori: Leo
- Gabriele Patriarca: Lorenzo
- Emanuela Ionica: Lisa
- Arianna Vignoli: Agnes
- Giulio Bartolomei: Niccolò
- Franco Mannella: Ciacco/Captain Fly
- Roberto Draghetti: Primo Ufficiale dei Pirati
- Davide Garbolino: Francis
- Roberto Stocchi: Cicala
- Oreste Baldini: Cantastorie
- Stefano Mondini: Padre di Lisa
- Stefano Billi: Killer

=== English ===
- Johnny Yong Bosch: Leo da Vinci
- Bryce Papenbrook: Lorenzo
- Cherami Leigh: Lisa
- Faith Graham: Agnes
- Landen Beattie: Niccoló
- Michael Sorich: Lisa's Father
- Keith Silverstein: Ciacco/Captain Fly
- Jamieson Price: First Mate of the Pirates

== Release and reception ==
Leo Da Vinci was released theatrically in Italy on 11 January 2018. It had a worldwide gross of $2,594,932.

The film received generally negative reviews from critics, and on review aggregator Rotten Tomatoes the film holds an approval rating of 43% based on seven critical reviews, indicating a "rotten" score.

== Legacy ==
In 2019, an animated series based on the film called Leo Da Vinci was released, which takes place after the events of the film.

== See also ==
- Cultural references to Leonardo da Vinci
