= Pet Pals: Marco Polo's Code =

2010 animated film

- Theatrical release poster
- Italian: Cuccioli - Il codice di Marco Polo
- Directed by: Sergio Manfio; Francesco Manfio
- Screenplay by: Sergio Manfio; Francesco Manfio; Anna Manfio
- Music by: Lorenzo Tomio; Sergio Manfio
- Production company: Gruppo Alcuni
- Distributed by: 01 Distribution (Italy); Alfa Pictures (Spain)
- Release dates: 22 January 2010 (Italy); 18 May 2012 (Spain)
- Running time: 95 minutes
- Countries: Italy; Spain
- Language: Italian
- Box office: $1,854,941

Pet Pals: Marco Polo's Code (Italian: Cuccioli - Il codice di Marco Polo), also released simply as Pet Pals, is a 2010 animated children's film directed by Sergio Manfio and Francesco Manfio, from a screenplay by Sergio, Francesco and Anna Manfio. Produced by Gruppo Alcuni, Marco Polo's Code is based on the Pet Pals animated children's television series. It was released in Italian cinemas on 22 January 2010. A sequel, titled Pet Pals in Windland, was released on 27 March 2014.

== Premise ==
The Pet Pals, armed with a hint of magic, must combine their strengths when the evil Crow Witch tries to drain the canals of Venice.

== Voice cast ==
Original version:

- Monica Ward as Olly (Holly)
- Laura Lenghi as Diva
- Paolo Lombardi as Portatile (Moby)
- Edoardo Nevola as Cilindro
- Gigi Rosa as Pio
- Paola Giannetti as Maga Cornacchia (the Crow Witch)
- Gerolamo Alchieri as Ambrogio
- Enrico Di Troia as Cuncun
- Franco Mannella as Canbaluc
- Pino Ammendola as Aldo
- Tiziana Avarista as Alda
- Mario Bombardieri as Bamba
- Luigi Ferraro as Rajim

The following is the voice cast of the English dubbed version:

- David North as Moby
- Raphael Siary as Tophat
- Ashley Thrill as Diva and the Crow Witch
- Shannon Settlemyre as Holly
- Steve Rassin as Pio
- Marc Matney as Cuncun, Canbaluc and Ambrogio
- Steve Vernon as Aldo
- Michael Yeager as Rajim

== Release ==
Pet Pals: Marco Polo's Code was released in Italian cinemas on 22 January 2010 by 01 Distribution. It had an opening gross of $456,236, grossing a total of $994,776. The film was released in Spain on 18 May 2012, and opened with $239,588 for a total gross of $857,407, contributing to its worldwide box office gross of $1,854,941.

== Sequel ==
A sequel, Pet Pals in Windland, was released on 27 March 2014. It was a co-production between Gruppo Alcuni and LuxAnimation.
