= Les Misérables (1948 film) =

1948 film

Les Miserables
- Italian film poster for first part of the film
- Directed by: Riccardo Freda
- Screenplay by: Riccardo Freda; Mario Monicelli; Vittorio Nino Novarese; Stefano Vanzina
- Based on: Les Misérables; 1862 novel by Victor Hugo
- Produced by: Carlo Ponti
- Starring: Gino Cervi; Valentina Cortese; Hans Hinrich; Luigi Pavese; Jone Romano
- Cinematography: Rodolfo Lombardi
- Edited by: Otello Colangeli
- Music by: Alessandro Cicognini
- Production company: Lux Film
- Distributed by: Lux Film
- Release dates: 10 January 1948 (Italy, first part); 21 January 1948 (Italy, second part)
- Running time: 178 minutes
- Country: Italy
- Language: Italian

Les Miserables (Italian: I miserabili) is a 1948 Italian drama film directed by Riccardo Freda. It is based on the Victor Hugo's 1862 novel Les Misérables and stars Gino Cervi as Jean Valjean, Valentina Cortese as Fantine and Cosette, and Hans Hinrich as Javert. After the financial success of Freda's previous film The Black Eagle, Freda worked a deal with Lux Film and began developing an adaptation of Les Misérables with Mario Monicelli, Vittorio Nino Novarese and Stefano Vanzina. The film was shot entirely in Rome.

Freda's version of the film ran for over three hours in length and was released as two separate films in Italy one week from another in January 1948. The film became the highest-grossing Italian film production of the year.

== Plot ==
=== Caccia all'uomo ===
In France, Jean Valjean tries to steal a loaf of bread to feed his nephews, but is immediately taken by the police and sentenced to five years in prison, which becomes 18 due to his numerous attempts at escape. After his sentence is served, he is turned away by everyone, with the only positive gesture being given to the Bishop of Digne, from whom he had stolen two candelabras, who convinces him to change his life. He then builds a new identity as Mr. Madeleine, and becomes a successful industrialist. During these years, however, Inspector Javert has never stopped looking for Valjean and constantly searches for him. Valjean reacts by attempting to flee, but first fulfills a promise he has made to Fantine, a young woman driven out of the factory after it is discovered she is an unmarried mother who has to take care of her daughter Cosette. She is temporarily entrusted to Mrs. Thenardier who, despite the money received from Valjean, treats Cosette as a slave.

=== Tempesta su Parigi ===
Fourteen years later, all the characters meet in Paris. Valjean has built a new identity as Leblanc and protects Cosette, keeping her away from the world and unaware of their past. The Thenardier family runs an inn where Marius, the young revolutionary, is staying, and with whom their daughter is secretly in love. Marius flees from the police and hides in the Leblanc house, where he falls in love with Cosette. Valjean is discovered by Thenardier, who intends to take revenge but is stopped by Javert.

During the revolutionary uprisings of 1832, the fate of the various characters is fulfilled. Marius is injured and brought by Valjean to the home of his father, the police minister, and also thanks to Javert, who finally understands his mistake and leaves him free, but kills himself by leaping into the Seine. Marius reconciles with his father, and he and Cosette can fulfill their dream of a relationship. They get married while Thenardier reappears and dies after shooting Valjean.

== Cast ==
- Gino Cervi as Jean Valjean
- Valentina Cortese as Fantine and Cosette (as an adult)
- Hans Hinrich as Javert
- Aldo Nicodemi as Marius
- Luigi Pavese as Thenardier
- Jone Romano as Mrs. Thenardier
- Ugo Sasso as Enjolras
- Gabriele Ferzetti as Tholomyes (uncredited)

== Production ==
Due to the success of Riccardo Freda's film The Black Eagle, which was the second-highest-grossing film in Italy in 1946, Freda was able to adapt one of his favourite novels, Les Misérables by Victor Hugo. The film began thanks to Riccardo Gualino, the head of Italy's production company Lux Film. An Italian critic and film historian described Lux Film as "Italy's biggest and most ambitious production company" as of 1947, and that it had a "strongly focused policy that recalled those adapted by the Hollywood Majors." Freda described his relationship with Gualino positively, stating that their relationship went beyond a commercial deal, stating that the two "never talked about films, and discussed of art and literature instead. He was a very cultured person." He also said, "With Gualino, I used to sign a deal in five minutes. That is to say, he simply asked me 'Freda, what film do you want to make?' and that was that." Freda originally conceived of adapting the novel when on a taxi ride with fellow directors Mario Soldati, Renato Castellani and Guido M. Gatti. The four were brainstorming to find stories to adapt to film, with Freda suggesting Les Misérables, which the others were astonished at, feeling it would be impossible to turn into a film. The newspaper Corriere d'informazione spitefully commented on Freda's decision to adapt the story, stating that there was a lack of adventurousness in film makers and producers who were often adopting plays and books, with Arturo Lanocita stating, "The Bottom has been reached with director Riccardo Freda, who after thinking about it for a long time, decided to shoot the 39th version of Les Misérable, a novel which perhaps you've heard of."

For the second time in a row, Freda worked on the film's script with Steno and Mario Monicelli, and for the first time Vittorio Nino Novarese, who was an art director who had just started his work as a screenwriter. The trio's script makes specific changes to the story: Marius becomes the son of the Minister of Police and in the end Jean Valjean is killed by Thenardier. Freda commented that he wanted Valjean to "be a hero, and not a character afflicted by his past. [...] I wanted a righter of wrongs, like the Black Eagle or later Casanova of Maciste." Freda recalled that "Adapting a novel I admired so much brought up insane problems, even more because the film was made in Italy", stating that among his films he "put the most of myself [in Les Miserables]". The film was shot entirely in Rome, and involved reconstructing early 19th-century Paris entirely in the studio.

Among the cast was Gino Cervi playing Jean Valjean, which was the third time he would work with Freda. Freda stated that Cervi would wear "a bourgeois dress with golden buttons. I explained to him that he should look miserable, since he had to steal bread to feed his nephew. But he wouldn't understand. He only thought of the female audience: he had appeared in rags, his career would have ended." Freda solved the problem by throwing talcum over Cervi's frock during takes to make it look old and ragged. Valentina Cortese reflected on her role in the film, stating that "Freda was a temperamental filmmaker: one day we were shooting a scene depicting the revolutionary uprisings, tomato sauce everywhere, shoots, extra running en masse, and Freda gave me a shove so as to push me into the frame under a restive horse. My God, what a scare!" Also among the cast was Marcello Mastroianni in his film debut as one of Marius' revolutionist friends.

== Release ==
Freda's film had a running time of over three hours. It was submitted to the board of censors in December 1947 as two separate films, which were released in Italy within the space of one week. The first was titled Caccia all'uomo (transl. Man Hunt), which opened on 21 January 1948, and the second was titled Tempesta su Parigi (transl. Storm Over Paris), which opened on 28 January. The film grossed a total of 375 million lire, making it the highest-grossing Italian film of 1948.

The film was also distributed abroad, including in France where it was titled L'évadé du bagne and cut to 110 minutes without consultation with Freda. The film was also released in the United States as Les Miserables in March 1952.

== Reception ==
In the United States, Joe Phodna of the New York Herald Tribune reviewed an English-language dubbed version with a running time of about two hours, stating that it had "emphasis on movement rather than social significance" and that Gino Cervi's performance was solid but uninspired. A review in The New York Times found that Valjean and Javert became two-dimensional figures whose characters "rarely, if ever, come to life" The review also commented on Freda, stating that "the director has managed to extract some of the excitement and movement inherent in the book".

== See also ==
- Adaptations of Les Misérables
