= Monica Ward =

Italian voice actress

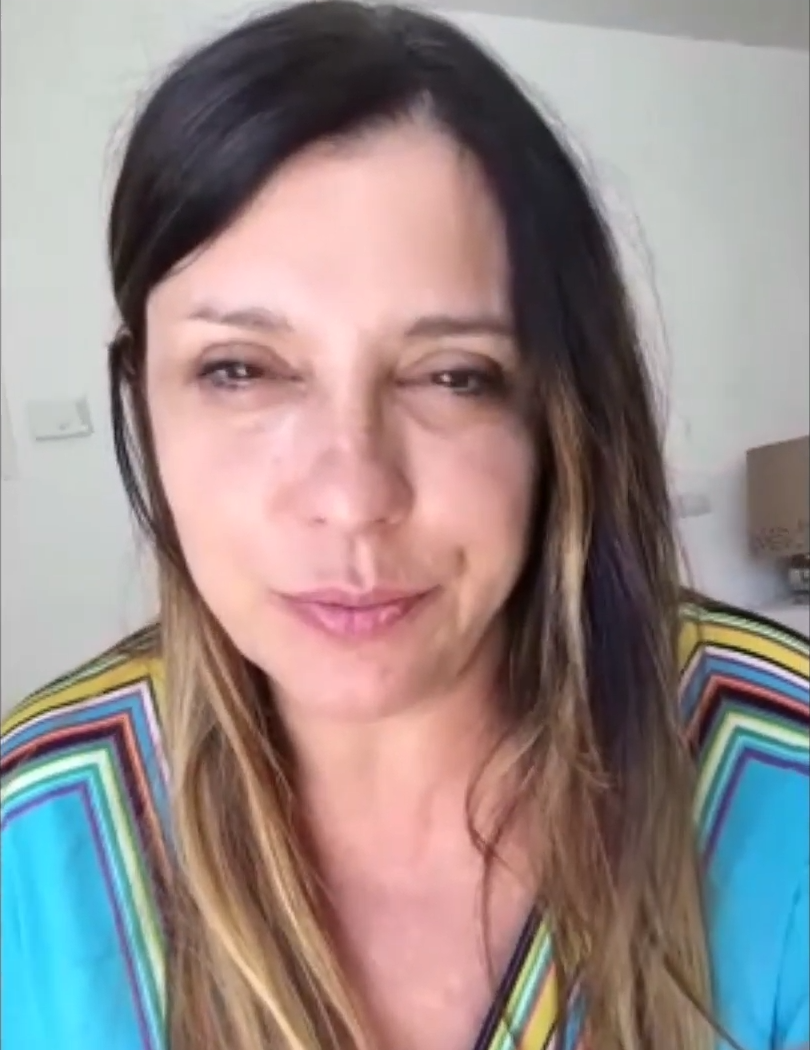
- Ward in 2020
- Born: 5 August 1965 (age 60); Rome, Italy
- Occupations: Actress; voice actress; dubbing director
- Children: 2
- Parents: Aleardo Ward (father); Maresa Ward (mother)
- Relatives: Luca Ward (brother); Andrea Ward (brother); Jone Romano (grandmother); Carlo Romano (step-grandfather)

Monica Ward (born 5 August 1965) is an Italian voice actress and dubbing director who occasionally works as a film and television actress.

== Biography ==
The youngest child and only daughter of actors Aleardo and Maresa Ward, and sister of actors Luca and Andrea Ward, she has American ancestry on her father's side, as her paternal grandfather was a U.S Marine during World War I.

Monica Ward has voiced animated characters such as Nova in the Winx Club series created by Iginio Straffi, as well as the two main characters Elena and Ezechiele in the international coproduction Monster Allergy. She is best known to Italian audiences for having dubbed Lisa Simpson in the animated series The Simpsons. Ward also performed the dubbed roles of Marina in the second Italian dub of Hans Christian Andersen's The Little Mermaid, Steff in Freakazoid!, Shock in The Nightmare Before Christmas, Blossom of The Powerpuff Girls and various characters in Paw Patrol.

== Voice work ==
- Gian Burrasca in Il giornalino di Gian Burrasca – animated film (1991)
- Esmeralda in Quasimodo – Il gobbo di Notre Dame – animated film (1997)
- Olly (Holly) in Pet Pals – animated series (2002-2009), Pet Pals: Marco Polo's Code – animated film (2010), Pet Pals in Windland – animated film (2014), Mini cuccioli – animated series (2016-2019), Mini cuccioli a scuola – animated series (2021-2022)
- Ruoti in Gli Animotosi nella terra di Nondove – animated film (2005)
- Jolly and Nova in Winx Club – animated series (2005-2014)
- Rubina, Lady Kraft and La Gatta in Rat-Man – animated series (2005-2006)
- Pato in I Lampaclima e l'isola misteriosa – animated film (2006)
- Elena Patata and Ezechiele Zick in Monster Allergy – animated series (2006-2009)
- Nanna in Gli Smile and Go e il braciere di fuoco – animated film (2007)
- Laura in Leonardo – animated series (2007)
- Marianna in Sandokan - Le due tigri – animated series (2008)
- Bronto in I Saurini e i viaggi del meteorite nero – animated series (2008-2016)
- Matilde in Slash:// – animated series (2011)
- Alena in Star Key (animated series) – animated series (2018)
- Lampadino in Lampadino e Caramella nel MagiRegno degli Zampa – animated series (2020)

=== Italian-dubbed animated roles ===
- Lisa Simpson, Maggie Simpson and other voices in The Simpsons, Lisa Simpson in The Simpsons Movie
- Shock in The Nightmare Before Christmas
- Nakoma in Disney's Pocahontas and Pocahontas II: Journey to a New World
- Ranma Saotome (female) in Ranma ½ (episodes 1-161, 1st dub)
- Kyoko Otonashi, Kentaro Ichinose and Ritsuko Chigusa in Maison Ikkoku (episodes 1-52)
- Mindy, Tinker, Elmyra Duff and Goopi Goop in Animaniacs
- Herbie, Sniffle and Nerdluck Pound in Space Jam
- Steff in Freakazoid!
- Blossom in The Powerpuff Girls, Powerpuff Girls Z, The Powerpuff Girls Movie
- Blair in Soul Eater
- Angelica Pickles in Rugrats (2nd dub)
- Marina in Hans Christian Andersen's The Little Mermaid (2nd dub)
- Skunk in Skunk Fu!
- Heather in Total Drama
- Caitlin Cooke in 6teen
- Nova in Super Robot Monkey Team Hyperforce Go!
- Cathy Kawaye in Sarah Lee Jones
- Maggie Lee in Maya & Miguel
- Nicky Little in Pepper Ann
- Juniper Lee in The Life and Times of Juniper Lee
- Jelly in TeachTown
- Haruna Sakurada in Sailor Moon
- Leona Lion in Between the Lions
- Diana Lombard in Martin Mystery
- Filmore in South Park
- Marshall, Farmer Yumi, and various characters in PAW Patrol
- Lola Bunny in Baby Looney Tunes
- Lily in LeapFrog
- Marinette in Tomodachi Life: The TV Series
- Vince LaSalle in Recess
- Laura Carrot, Annie, Miss Achmetha and Grandma Gourd in VeggieTales
- Maria Hill in The Avengers: Earth's Mightiest Heroes
- Boots in Dora the Explorer
- Todd in ToddWorld
- Athena, Josephine X, Spring Horae, Hera in Class of the Titans
- Sagwa in Sagwa, the Chinese Siamese Cat
- Mimi in Baby Felix
- Sophie McNally in ChalkZone
- Sandra Babcox in ParaNorman
- Diana Lombard in Martin Mystery
- Keenie in Helluva Boss

=== Italian-dubbed live action roles ===
- Cheerleader in Scream
- Samantha Spade in Without a Trace (played by Poppy Montgomery)
- Summer Van Horn in Make It or Break It (played by Candace Cameron Bure)

== Filmography ==
- Seven Kilometers from Jerusalem (2007) - Irene Castelli
- Carabinieri - TV series, episode 7. 22 (2008) - Piazza's wife
- Nauta (2011) - Saura
- CentoVetrine (2013) - Daniela Clementi
- Fuori onda - TV miniseries (2015) - Miranda
- Un posto al sole - TV series (2015/16) - Simona Borrelli

== Dubbing director ==
- Total Drama
- Chuck (season 2-present)

== See also ==
- Non-English versions of The Simpsons
