= Jone Romano =

Italian actress (1898–1979)

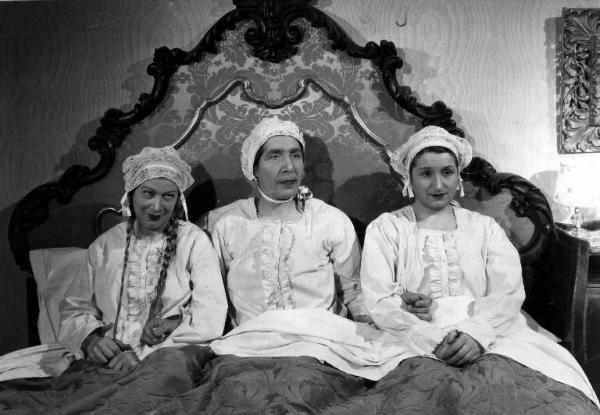
- Romano (left) in The Hussar Captain (1940)
- Born: Flora Borgheri; 3 February 1893; Pistoia, Italy
- Died: 21 February 1961 (aged 68); Rome, Italy
- Occupation: Actress
- Years active: 1939–1950
- Spouse(s): William James Ward (deceased); Carlo Romano (m. 1933)
- Children: Aleardo Ward
- Relatives: Luca Ward (grandson); Andrea Ward (grandson); Monica Ward (granddaughter)

Jone Romano (born Flora Borgheri; 3 February 1893 – 21 February 1961) was an Italian actress who appeared on stage and screen.

== Biography ==
She appeared in the 1948 film adaptation of Les Misérables. Her career as an actress was relatively short.

=== Personal life ===
Romano was married to the actor Carlo Romano. Before her marriage to Romano, she was widowed to American World War I marine William James Ward. Together, they had a son, Aleardo, who became an actor. She was also the grandmother to voice actors Luca, Andrea and Monica.

== Filmography ==
Year	Title	Role	Notes
1939	La voce senza volto	Maria, la cameriera della pensione	
1939	Father For a Night	Zia Paolina	
1939	Follie del secolo	Paolina, la cameriera	
1939	The Silent Partner	La direttrice dell' educandato	
1940	Il ponte dei sospiri	La padrona della taverna	
1940	The Hussar Captain	La zitella	
1943	La moglie in castigo		
1948	Les Misérables	La Thenardier	
1950	The Last Days of Pompeii	Stratonica	Uncredited, (final film role)

== Bibliography ==
- Delphine Gleizes. L'œuvre de Victor Hugo à l'écran: des rayons et des ombres. Presses Université Laval, 2005.
