= Paolo Lombardi =

Italian actor

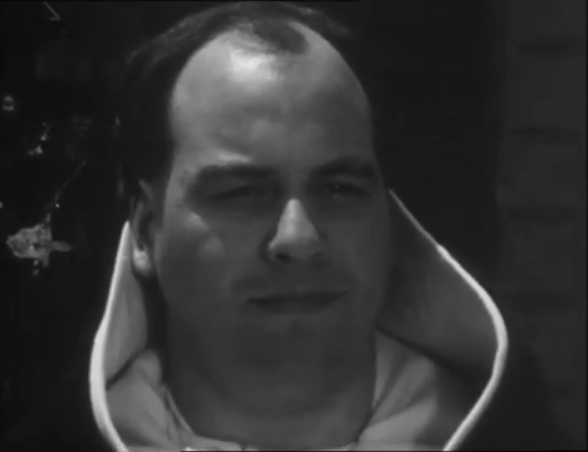
- Lombardi in Tommaso d'Aquino (1975)
- Born: 23 December 1944 (age 81); Siena, Italy
- Occupations: Actor; voice actor
- Years active: 1965–present

Paolo Lombardi (born 23 December 1944) is an Italian actor and voice actor.

== Biography ==
Lombardi began his activity as a theatre actor in his hometown, Siena. In the mid-1960s he performed his first television roles; through the years, he acted in many films and TV productions, both Italian and international, working with directors such as Giuseppe Tornatore, John Irvin, Robert Markowitz and Vittorio Sindoni.

Lombardi is well-known as a voice actor, having dubbed Alfred Hitchcock in Alfred Hitchcock Presents and other media, even portraying him in a stage adaptation of the book Hitchcock/Truffaut with French actor Jacques Peyrac as François Truffaut. He also dubbed over the voice of Richard Griffiths in many of his films, most notably as Vernon Dursley in the Italian dub of the Harry Potter film series. He has even voiced characters in animated films, such as Colonel in Lucky and Zorba, Maurice in the Italian version of Disney's Beauty and the Beast and Jumba Jookiba in the Italian version of the Lilo & Stitch franchise.

== Filmography ==
=== Cinema ===
Year	Title	Role	Notes
1976	Quel movimento che mi piace tanto		
1994	A Pure Formality	Marshal	
1994	Law of Courage	Honourable	
1994	The Heroes	Commissioner	
1994	Io mi salverò?		Short film
1994	Prestazione straordinaria		
1995	A Month by the Lake	Enrico	
1995	Soldato ignoto	Private Archibald White	
1998	Dirty Linen	Dr. Collodi	
1998	Medley - Brandelli di scuola		
2001	Our Tropical Island	Bormioli	
2001	Un Aldo qualunque	De Giacomo	
2002	Piovono mucche	Doctor	
2003	Olimpo Lupo - Cronista di nera		
2004	L'amore ritrovato	Bank manager	
2006	The Roses of the Desert		
2007	A Beautiful Wife	Zampaglione	
2009	Little Sea		
2014	The Face of an Angel		
2023	Coupon - Il film della felicità		Short film

=== Television ===
Year	Title	Role	Notes
1965	Le avventure di Laura Storm		TV series, episode Défilé per un delitto
1966	Il conte di Montecristo		TV miniseries, episode Il conte
1967	Caravaggio		TV miniseries, second episode
1968	La commedia degli errori	Dromio of Ephesus	TV play
1969	Nero Wolfe		TV series, episode Il pesce più grosso
1972	Sul filo della memoria	Journalist	TV miniseries, episode Il sequestro
1973	Delitto di regime - Il caso Don Minzoni	Defense attorney	TV miniseries
1973	Ladri e quadri		TV film
1975	Tommaso d'Aquino (film)	Tommaso D'Aquino	TV film
1976	Qui squadra mobile	Secondo operatore	TV series, 6 episodes
1978	Il processo	Willem	TV film
1980	Il commedione	Monsignor Tizzani	TV play
1994	Nonno Felice	Marshal Micheloni	TV series, episode Sotto il vestito nonno
1995	Il prezzo del denaro		TV film
1995	Morte di una strega	Paoletti	TV miniseries
1995	Norma e Felice	Marshal Micheloni	TV series, episode Alè oh! Oh!
1996	Positano		TV miniseries (1996)
1997	Linda e il brigadiere		TV series, episode L'asciugamano scomparso
1998	Trenta righe per un delitto		TV miniseries
1998	Nicholas' Gift		TV film
2001	Piccolo mondo antico		TV miniseries
2001	Don Matteo		TV series, episode Il morso del serpente
2002	St. Francis	Teobaldo Del Drappo	TV film
2002	Stiamo bene insieme		TV series
2004	Madre come te	Pintus	TV film
2004	The Lives of the Saints	Antonio DeLucci	TV miniseries
2004	La omicidi	Principal	TV series, 6 episodes
2004	Regina dei fiori	Minor judge	TV miniseries
2005	Il capitano		TV series, episode Il lavandaio
2007	Le ragazze di San Frediano		TV miniseries
2008	Per una notte d'amore	Annibale	TV miniseries
2008	VIP	Arturo, the butler	TV film
2009	Il commissario Manara	Dr. Masini	TV series
2009	Butta la luna	Magistrate Binetti	TV series, season 2
2011	Distretto di Polizia	Ascani, medical examiner	TV series, episode 11x10

== Voice work ==
Year	Title	Role	Notes
1998	Lucky and Zorba	Colonel	Animated film
2001	I Magotti e la Pentola Magica	Babamas	Animated film
2003–2016	Pet Pals	Moby	Animated series (Main cast)
2005	Magic Sport - Il calcio magnetico	Il Lupo Arbitro	Animated film
2005	And Yet it Moves	Carlo	Animated series
2005	And Yet it Moves	Portatile (Moby)	Animated series
2005	And Yet it Moves	Galileo Galilei	Animated series
2009	Pet Pals: Marco Polo's Code	Moby	Animated film
2012	Pinocchio	The Owl	Animated film
2013	Doggywood	Oliver	Animated series
2014	Pet Pals in Windland	Moby	Animated film
2014–2018	Spike Team	Luther	Animated series (seasons 2–3)
2018	Mini cuccioli - Le quattro stagioni	Portatile	Animated film
2021	Mini cuccioli a scuola	Portatile	Animated series, season 1

=== Dubbing ===
==== Films (Animation, Italian dub) ====
Year	Title	Role(s)	Ref
1975	Hugo the Hippo	Aban-Khan	
1978	Lucky Luke: The Ballad of the Daltons	Steve Bugman	
1989	Happily Ever After	Scowl	
1991	Beauty and the Beast	Maurice	
1999	The Twelve Months	Chancellor	
2000	Joseph: King of Dreams	Butler	
2001	Atlantis: The Lost Empire	Fenton Q. Harcourt	
2002	Lilo & Stitch	Dr. Jumba Jookiba	
2002	Ice Age	Lenny	
2003	Stitch! The Movie	Dr. Jumba Jookiba	
2004	Mickey's Twice Upon a Christmas	Narrator	
2004	Felix the Cat Saves Christmas	Santa Claus	
2005	Lilo & Stitch 2: Stitch Has a Glitch	Dr. Jumba Jookiba	
2009	The Tale of Despereaux	Principal	
2009	A Christmas Carol	Portly Gentleman #1	
2015	Mune: Guardian of the Moon	Glim's father	
2017	The Boss Baby	Wizzie	

==== Films (Live action, Italian dub) ====
Year	Title	Role(s)	Original actor	Ref
1970	The 39 Steps	Mr. Memory (1970 redub)	Wylie Watson	
1971	Support Your Local Gunfighter	Bud Barton	Dick Curtis	
1971	Perched on a Tree	Radio journalist	Paul Préboist	
1972	The Candidate	Howard Klein	Allen Garfield	
1972	Night of the Lepus	Elgin Clark	DeForest Kelley	
1973	Enter the Dragon	Golfer	Allan Kent	
1973	Mean Streets	Joey	George Memmoli	
1975	Galileo	Galileo Galilei	Chaim Topol	
1976	Buffalo Bill and the Indians, or Sitting Bull's History Lesson	Grover Cleveland	Pat McCormick	
1976	The Outlaw Josey Wales	Sim Carstairs	William O'Connell	
1976	A Matter of Time	Hotel Manager	Geoffrey Copleston	
1979	Velvet Hands	Benny	John Sharp	
1980	Any Which Way You Can	Zack Tupper	Barry Corbin	
1980	The Last War	Mokichi Tamura	Frankie Sakai	
1983	Endgame	Bull	Gabriele Tinti	
1984	A Private Function	Allardyce	Richard Griffiths	
1984	Amadeus	Emperor Joseph II	Jeffrey Jones	
1984	Terror in the Aisles	Alfred Hitchcock	Alfred Hitchcock	
1985	The Purple Rose of Cairo	Monk	Danny Aiello	
1985	House	Harold Gorton	George Wendt	
1985	Commando	Captain Bennett	Vernon Wells	
1986	7 chili in 7 giorni	Monsignore	Franco Adducci	
1989	The Rachel Papers	Dr. Knowd	Michael Gambon	
1989	Massacre Play	Cornelius Plank	Galeazzo Benti	
1989	Uncle Buck	Pooter the Clown	Mike Starr	
1989	Henry V	Duke of Burgundy	Harold Innocent	
1990	Cadillac Man	Benny	Eddie Jones	
1990	Texasville	Lester Marlow	Randy Quaid	
1991	Fried Green Tomatoes	Reverend Scroggins	Richard Riehle	
1991	Love in the Time of Hysteria	Dr. Mateo Mateos	Luis de Icaza	
1991	Curly Sue	Bernard Oxbar	Fred Thompson	
1991	Rhapsody in August	Tadao	Hisashi Igawa	
1992	Death Becomes Her	Chagall	Ian Ogilvy	
1992	Blame It on the Bellboy	Maurice Horton	Richard Griffiths	
1992	In the Soup	Old Man	Sully Boyar	
1992	The Player	Dick Mellon	Sydney Pollack	
1992	Passenger 57	Chief Leonard Biggs	Ernie Lively	
1993	The Remains of the Day	Dupont d'Ivry	Michael Lonsdale	
1993	Where the Rivers Flow North	Sheriff LaFontaine	Dennis Mientka	
1993	Dave	Bob Alexander	Frank Langella	
1994	Squanto: A Warrior's Tale	Sir George	Michael Gambon	
1994	Revenge of the Musketeers	Porthos	Raoul Billerey	
1994	Cemetery Man	Gnaghi	François Hadji-Lazaro	
1994	The Monster	Dr. Paride Taccone	Michel Blanc	
1994	Radioland Murders	General Walt Whalen	Ned Beatty	
1995	The Englishman Who Went up a Hill but Came down a Mountain	George Garrad	Ian McNeice	
1995	Father of the Bride Part II	Dr. Brooks	Jay Wolpert	
1995	Babe	Narrator	Roscoe Lee Browne	
1995	Candyman: Farewell to the Flesh	Reverend Ellis	Bill Nunn	
1995	Richard III	Archbishop Thomas Bourchier	Roger Hammond	
1995	Dead Man	John Dickinson	Robert Mitchum	
1995	Jack and Sarah	William	Ian McKellen	
1996	Homeward Bound II: Lost in San Francisco	Ashcan	Jon Polito	
1996	The Secret Agent	Chief Inspector Heat	Jim Broadbent	
1996	Fargo	Stan Grossman	Larry Brandenburg	
1996	The Quest	Harry Smythe	Jack McGee	
1996	Alaska	Sam Grazer	Don S. Davis	
1996	Sgt. Bilko	Colonel John T. Hall	Dan Aykroyd	
1996	The Phantom	Dave Palmer	Bill Smitrovich	
1997	The Beautician and the Beast	Ira Grushinsky	Ian McNeice	
1997	For Richer or Poorer	Samuel Yoder	Jay O. Sanders	
1997	Jungle 2 Jungle	Alexei Jovanovic	David Ogden Stiers	
1998	Babe: Pig in the City	Narrator	Roscoe Lee Browne	
1999	Dudley Do-Right	Narrator	Corey Burton	
1999	The Insider	Eric Kluster	Stephen Tobolowsky	
1999	Life	Superintendent Abernathy	O'Neal Compton	
1999	Inferno	Jubal Early	Pat Morita	
2000	Crocodile Dundee in Los Angeles	Miloš Drubnik	Jonathan Banks	
2000	102 Dalmatians	George Torte	Ian Richardson	
2000	Rules of Engagement	Judge Col. E. Warner	Richard McGonagle	
2000	Under the Sand	Gérard	Pierre Vernier	
2000	Cast Away	Stan	Nick Searcy	
2001	Harry Potter and the Philosopher's Stone	Vernon Dursley	Richard Griffiths	
2001	Blow Dry	Tony	Warren Clarke	
2001	Vidocq	Lautrennes	André Dussollier	
2001	Monster's Ball	Buck Grotowski	Peter Boyle	
2001	The Princess Diaries	Adolpho	Robert Glaudini	
2001	K-PAX	Sal	Peter Gerety	
2001	Mostly Martha	Herr Steinberg	Gerhard Garbers	
2001	Kate & Leopold	Millard Mountbatten	Paxton Whitehead	
2002	Harry Potter and the Chamber of Secrets	Vernon Dursley	Richard Griffiths	
2002	The Count of Monte Cristo	Colonel Villefort / Clarion	Freddie Jones	
2002	Nicholas Nickleby	Newman Noggs	Tom Courtenay	
2003	Down with Love	E.G.	John Aylward	
2003	Scorched	Bank Employer	Jeffrey Tambor	
2004	The Princess Diaries 2: Royal Engagement	Prime Minister Motaz	Joel McCrary	
2004	Harry Potter and the Prisoner of Azkaban	Vernon Dursley	Richard Griffiths	
2004	A Good Woman	Cecil	Roger Hammond	
2004	Kings and Queen	Abel Vuillard	Jean-Paul Roussillon	
2004	The Phantom of the Opera	Auctioneer	Paul Brooke	
2004	Kinsey	Huntington Hartford	John McMartin	
2004	Downfall	Alfred Jodl	Christian Redl	
2004	Mysterious Skin	Charlie	Richard Riehle	
2004	The Chorus	Mr. Langlois	Philippe du Janerand	
2005	By the Pricking of My Thumbs	Mr. Coupelay	Maurice Risch	
2005	Munich	Papa	Michael Lonsdale	
2005	White Noise	Raymond Price	Ian McNeice	
2005	Cinderella Man	Father Roddick	Chuck Shamata	
2005	Keeping Mum	The Judge	Roger Hammond	
2005	The Brothers Grimm	Contemptuous Villager	Milan Gargula	
2006	Goya's Ghosts	King Charles IV	Randy Quaid	
2006	Relative Strangers	Doug Clayton	Edward Herrmann	
2006	The Queen	Prince Philip	James Cromwell	
2007	Harry Potter and the Order of the Phoenix	Vernon Dursley	Richard Griffiths	
2007	Hot Fuzz	Tom Weaver	Edward Woodward	
2008	Changeling	Dr. Earl W. Tarr	Peter Gerety	
2008	Bedtime Stories	Barry Nottingham	Richard Griffiths	
2008	The Oxford Murders	Inspector Petersen	Jim Carter	
2008	Mamma Mia!	Father Alex	Niall Buggy	
2009	In the Electric Mist	Twinky LeMoyne	Ned Beatty	
2009	Dorian Gray	Lord Radley	Michael Culkin	
2010	Harry Potter and the Deathly Hallows – Part 1	Vernon Dursley	Richard Griffiths	
2010	Romantics Anonymous	Rémi	Jacques Boudet	
2011	Pirates of the Caribbean: On Stranger Tides	King George II	Richard Griffiths	
2013	About Time	Lawyer	Richard Griffiths	
2013	47 Ronin	Shōgun Tsunayoshi Tokugawa	Cary-Hiroyuki Tagawa	
2014	Grace of Monaco	Alfred Hitchcock	Roger Ashton-Griffiths	
2014	Effie Gray	Travers Twiss	Derek Jacobi	
2017	Brawl in Cell Block 99	Warden Tuggs	Don Johnson	
2017	Like Shooting Stars	General	Héctor Alterio	
2018	The Guernsey Literary and Potato Peel Pie Society	Eben Ramsey	Tom Courtenay	
2018	The Wild Pear Tree	Ramazan	Ercüment Balakoğlu	
2018	Bird Box	Rick	Pruitt Taylor Vince	

==== Television (Animation, Italian dub) ====
Year	Title	Role(s)	Notes	Ref
1982	Chobin the Star Child	Dr. Amakawa	Main cast	
1991	The Simpsons	Various characters	Recurring role (season 1)	
1996	Animaniacs	Alfred Hitchcock	1 episode (season 1, episode 21)	
1999	Cowboy Bebop	Ladro	2 episodes (season 1x12-13)	
2000	Celebrity Deathmatch	Alfred Hitchcock	1 episode (season 3, episode 5)	
2004–2007	Lilo & Stitch: The Series	Dr. Jumba Jookiba	Main cast	
2007	Leroy & Stitch	Dr. Jumba Jookiba	TV film	
2007	Sagwa, the Chinese Siamese Cat	Magistrate	Main cast	

==== Television (Live action, Italian dub) ====
Year	Title	Role(s)	Notes	Original actor	Ref
1983–1984	Marron Glacê	Oscar	Main cast	Lima Duarte	
1984	Alfred Hitchcock Presents	Alfred Hitchcock	Main cast	Alfred Hitchcock	
1984	The Alfred Hitchcock Hour	Alfred Hitchcock	Main cast	Alfred Hitchcock	
1985	The New Alfred Hitchcock Presents	Alfred Hitchcock	Main cast	Alfred Hitchcock	
1986–2000	A Case for Two	Dr. Dieter Renz	Main cast (seasons 1–19)	Günter Strack	
2002	Project Viper	General Cartwright	TV film	William Langley Monroe	
2015–2016	Penny Dreadful	Vincent Brand	Recurring role (season 1)	Alun Armstrong	
2016	The Crown	Professor Hogg	1 episode (season 1, episode 7)	Alan Williams	
