= Hans Hinrich =

German actor and film director

- Born: 27 December 1903; Berlin, German Empire
- Died: 20 October 1974 (aged 70); West Berlin, West Germany
- Occupations: Director; Actor
- Years active: 1932–1972

Hans Hinrich (27 November 1903 – 20 October 1974) was a German film director and actor. He initially worked in Germany but later also worked in Italy where he was usually credited as Giovanni Hinrich.

Hinrich was a noted theatre director, before moving into film directing in 1932. Hinrich was of Jewish heritage but he converted to Catholicism. While he was initially granted permission to continue working following the Nazi takeover of Germany, he found it increasingly difficult and moved to Italy following the production of Freight from Baltimore (1938). During the Fascist era he made several films such as the historical Lucrezia Borgia (1940). When Hinrich was threatened with dismissal from the 1941 film Il vetturale del San Gottardo, several of his actors including Osvaldo Valenti secured a reversal of the decision by protesting their support for him.

After the war Hinrich moved from directing to acting. He made his on screen debut in the 1946 neorealist film Before Him All Rome Trembled and also appearing in Les Misérables (1948). He later returned to his native Germany.

== Filmography ==
=== Actor ===
- Before Him All Rome Trembled (1946) - Ufficiale Tedesco
- Les Misérables (1948) - Javert
- Tempesta su Parigi (1948) - Javert
- L'ebreo errante (1948) - Dr. Albert Schuster
- Crossroads of Passion (1948) - Fischer
- The Mysterious Rider (1948) - Il grande inquisitore
- Fabíola (1949) - Judge / Inquisitor
- The Last Days of Pompeii (1950) - Burbo (uncredited)
- Towers of Silence (1952) - Colonel Souka
- Roman Holiday (1953) - Dr. Bonnachoven (uncredited)
- Phantom Caravan (1954) - Aumont
- Uomini ombra (1954) - Maurice
- Das Wunder des Malachias (1961)
- The Woman in White (1971, TV series)

=== Director ===
- The Victor (1932)
- Darling of the Sailors (1937)
- Triad (1938)
- Between the Parents (1938)
- Freight from Baltimore (1938)
- Lucrezia Borgia (1940)
- Mist on the Sea (1944)
- Conchita and the Engineer (1954)

== Bibliography ==
- Lehman, Will & Grieb, Margit. Cultural Perspectives on Film, Literature, and Language. Universal-Publishers, 2010.
- Moudarres, Andrea & Purdy Moudarres, Christiana. New Worlds and the Italian Renaissance: Contributions to the History of European Intellectual Culture. BRILL, 2012.
