= Lucky and Zorba =

- Original theatrical poster
- Italian: La gabbianella e il gatto
- Directed by: Enzo D'Alò
- Screenplay by: Enzo D'Alò; Umberto Marino
- Story by: Luis Sepúlveda
- Produced by: Vittorio Cecchi Gori; Rita Rusić
- Starring: Luis Sepúlveda; Carlo Verdone; Antonio Albanese; Melba Ruffo
- Edited by: Rita Rossi
- Music by: David Rhodes
- Production company: Lanterna Magica
- Distributed by: Cecchi Gori (Italy)
- Release date: 10 December 1998
- Running time: 75 minutes
- Country: Italy
- Languages: Italian, English
- Box office: $6.8 million (Italy)

Lucky and Zorba (Italian: La gabbianella e il gatto; "The Little Seagull and the Cat") is a 1998 Italian animated drama film directed by Enzo D'Alò, based on The Story of a Seagull and the Cat Who Taught Her to Fly (Spanish: Historia de una gaviota y del gato que le enseñó a volar) by Luis Sepúlveda. The film was dubbed in English by Trimark Pictures in 1999 and aired on Toon Disney during the early-to-mid 2000s.

== Plot ==
On the coast of Hamburg, Germany, a gang of sewer rats steals food while a group of cats, led by the Colonel, plans to eliminate the rats and their leader, Great Big Rat. The ambush fails, forcing the cats to retreat. During the escape, a black cat named Zorba is injured but encounters Bubulina, a female cat with whom he becomes enamored. Meanwhile, off the coast, an oil tanker sinks, causing a massive oil spill.

The next day, a flock of seagulls is hunting for fish. Among them is Kengah, who is returning from her first migration and is about to lay her first egg. The flock dives underwater, but when their leader spots the oil spill, he warns the others. Kengah fails to hear the warning and is coated in the toxic sludge. She barely survives and struggles to fly, eventually crash-landing in a garden right on top of Zorba. Kengah pleads for her life, and Zorba assures her he has no interest in eating an oil-covered bird. He tries to lick her clean, but the foul taste disgusts him. Realizing she is dying, Kengah makes Zorba swear three promises: he must not eat her egg, he must care for it until it hatches, and he must teach the newborn to fly. Despite his hesitation, Zorba agrees and leaves to seek help from his friends. By the time they return, Kengah has died. Finding her egg under her wing, Zorba shares his promises with the other cats. Consulting encyclopedias in an abandoned museum, they instruct him on how to incubate it. Zorba gently sits on the egg, and later that night, the cats mourn Kengah and give her a proper burial.

Word of a cat hatching a bird's egg soon spreads, eventually reaching Bubulina and the Great Big Rat, who plots to use this situation to enslave the city's cats. The egg hatches, and the cats name the newborn seagull Lucky. Raised by felines, Lucky believes she is a cat. However, Pallino, a red kitten jealous of the attention she receives, maliciously tells Lucky that she is actually a bird and that her adoptive father intends to eat her. Devastated, Lucky runs away and is captured by the rat minions. Upon discovering her abduction, the cats gather cheese to construct a giant hollow wheel, using it to infiltrate the sewers like a Trojan Horse. Meanwhile, a remorseful Pallino sneaks into the sewers to save Lucky but gets captured alongside her. Just as the rats prepare to eat them, the cheese wheel arrives; the cats burst out, rescuing the pair and throwing the Great Big Rat and his henchmen into the canal.

With Lucky safe, Zorba and his friends set out to fulfill the final promise: teaching her to fly. After several failed attempts, Zorba realizes she needs to learn through instinct by jumping from a high altitude, just as a seagull mother would teach her chick. To access a high tower, Zorba must communicate with Bubulina's owner, a little girl named Nina. Breaking the feline taboo against speaking the human language, Zorba communicates with Nina in her dreams to enlist her help. At the top of the tower, Lucky finally calls Zorba by his name, telling him she loves him, and he returns the sentiment. She leaps from the tower and successfully takes flight. From below, a defeated Great Big Rat watches in rage. Before departing, Lucky swoops down to say a final goodbye, and Pallino affectionately acknowledges her as his little sister. Giving her first seagull call, Lucky joins a passing flock and flies into the night sky.

== Voice cast ==
=== Italian ===
- Carlo Verdone as Zorba
- Antonio Albanese as Great Big Rat
- Melba Ruffo as Bubulina
- Luis Sepúlveda as the Poet
- Sofia Baratta as Lucky (newborn)
- Veronica Puccio as Lucky (child)
- Martina Carpani Lucky (singing voice)
- Leda Battisti as Lucky (singing voice)
- Domitilla D'Amico as Lucky (teenager)
- Margherita Birri as Nina
- Alida Milana as Kengah
- Ivana Spagna as Kengah (singing voice)
- Paolo Lombardi as Colonel
- Luca Biagini as Diderot
- Valerio Ruggeri as Secretary (Gopher in the English dub)
- Gabriele Patriarca as Pallino (YoYo in English)
- Pierpaolo Silvestri as Pallino (YoYo in English) (singing voice)
- Paola Tedesco as Rose of the Winds (Salty Brine in the English dub)
- Massimo Lodolo as Chamberlain
- Fabrizio Vidale as Igor
- Roberto Stocchi as Rat 1
- Roberto Ciufoli as Rat 2
- Renata Biserni as Doorwoman

== Music ==
David Rhodes composed the film's original score. The film's soundtrack features several songs: "So volare" and "Canto di Kengah" are sung by Spagna, "Non sono un gatto" by Leda Battisti, "Siamo gatti" by Samuele Bersani, and "Duro lavoro" and "Noi siamo topi" are performed by Gaetano Curreri and Antonio Albanese.

== Box office ==
The film was one of the highest-grossing films of the year in Italy, with a gross of $6.8 million in Italy.

== Awards ==
The film won a special Nastro d'Argento and the audience award at the Montréal International Children's Film Festival. It's the most popular Italian animation movie, grossing at 12 billion Italian lira (around 7 million USD) at the box office

== Home video ==
Columbia TriStar Home Entertainment released the movie in DVD, with both Italian and English language track.
