= Pet Pals =

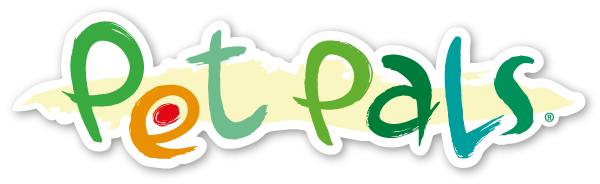
- Also known as: Cuccioli
- Created by: Sergio Manfio; Francesco Manfio
- Written by: Sergio Manfio; Francesco Manfio; Anna Manfio; Davide Stefano
- Directed by: Sergio Manfio
- Voices of: Edoardo Nefola; Laura Lenghi; Monica Ward; Gigi Rosa; Paolo Lombardi; Paola Giannetti; Franco Mannella; Enrico Di Troia; Manuel Neli
- Composers: Sergio Manfio; Lorenzo Tomio (season 5)
- Countries of origin: Italy; France (season 1); Hong Kong (season 1); India (seasons 2–4)
- Original language: Italian
- No. of seasons: 5
- No. of episodes: 156

Production
- Executive producers: Pietro Campedelli; Steven Ching (season 1); Sonia Farnesi (RAI, season 5)
- Producers: Francesco Manfio (Gruppo Alcuni); Lucia Bolzoni (RAI, seasons 1–4); Catherine Wong (season 1)
- Editor: Umberto Barison (seasons 2–5)
- Running time: 13 minutes
- Production companies: Rai Fiction; Gruppo Alcuni; Alphanim (season 1); Agogo Media (season 1); DQ Entertainment (seasons 2–4)

Original release
- Network: Rai 2 Rai Yoyo; Rai Gulp; Rai 3
- Release: 21 October 2003 – present

Pet Pals (Italian: Cuccioli) is an Italian animated television series. It was created by Sergio Manfio and Francesco Manfio while the Disney cartoonist Giorgio Cavazzano served as art director. Two feature films based on the series were produced: Cuccioli - Il codice di Marco Polo in 2010 and Cuccioli - Il paese del vento in 2014.

In 2026, the new season of 26 episodes titled Pet Pals Return is scheduled for release at the end of the year.

== Plot ==
In the first season has the Pet Pals get on the wrong ship and end up in various places around the world. The later seasons focus on the Pet Pals going to fantasy worlds with the Crow Witch, who first appeared in the final episode of the first season, being the antagonists for the rest of the series.

== Characters ==
- Holly - The shrewd and wise kitten of the group, she has brisk and hasty ways, with a direct and colorful language. Original voice actress: Monica Ward
- Top Hat - The goofy and troublemaking rabbit athlete. He is in love with Diva, but she only returns him with punches in the head. Original voice actor: Edoardo Nevola
- Pio - The eccentric and funny frog . He is a skilled imitator, a faculty that will often help the protagonists get out of trouble. Speak with a loud, low r. Original voice actor: Luigi Rosa
- Moby - The cultured, calm and sweet dog of letters, uses polished language and is a real mine of information. It is called that because as a puppy he swallowed a mobile phone, which sometimes rings in his stomach. Original voice actor: Paolo Lombardi
- Diva - The vain and impulsive fashion expert duck. With her comical pretense of being a prima donna, she often gets the group into trouble. He vents the failures of his claims by punching Top Hat in the head. Original voice actress: Laura Lenghi
- Nameless - The smallest of the group. He is a chick that has never learned to speak and expresses himself using signs depicting objects of all kinds. Many times the figures take shape and the Cubs use the objects created to get out of the way.
- Little Wizard - A young wizard, former prisoner of Maga Cornacchia and friend of the Pet Pals. - Manuel Meli original voice actor
- Crow Witch - The terrible and treacherous witch crow, sworn enemy of the Pet Pals and main antagonist of the series. Her goal is to become the ruler of the entire Middlewood through various spells (the puppet spell, the wind-blown potion, the potion that erases the past, the unwritten potion), but she is always thwarted and defeated by the Pet Pals. Original voice actors: Paola Giannetti and Graziella Polesinanti
  - Cuncun and Canbaluc - They are two weasel henchmen of Crow Witch, faithful, but a bit stupid. Original voice actors: Franco Mannella and Enrico Di Troia
- Ambrogio - The vulture Crow Witch's butler appeared starting from the first film. Compared to Cambaluc and Cuncun, he is definitely Maga Cornacchia's most intelligent and loyal henchman. Original voice actor: Gerolamo Alchieri
- Methuselah - The wise and intelligent tree that appears only in the spin-off Mini Pet Pals. Original voice actor: Piero Di Blasio.

== See also ==
- List of Italian television series
