= List of Monster Allergy characters =

This is the list of characters from Buena Vista Comics/Panini Comics' comic book Monster Allergy and its animated series.

== Protagonists ==
=== Ezekiel Zick ===
Ezekiel 'Zick' Barrymore (Ezechiele Zick in the original Italian version) is the male protagonist in the comic book and animated TV series, Monster Allergy. In the animated series, he is voiced by Holly Gauthier-Frankel in English, Monica Ward in Italian and Féodor Atkine in French. Zick is a young boy who is considered "strange" for his ability to see monsters others cannot see. He suffers from allergies that allow him to sense dangerous monsters.

=== Elena Potato ===
Elena Potato (Elena Patata in the original Italian version) is the female protagonist in the comic book and the animated TV series, Monster Allergy. In the animated series, she is voiced by Annie Bovaird in English, Monica Ward in Italian and Marie-Laure Dougnac in French.

Elena is Ezekiel Zick's Italian best friend around his age. She helps him in their adventures. She adores cats and the world of invisible monsters.

== Villains ==
=== Major villains ===
==== Magnacat ====
Magnacat is a powerful Gorka who operates as the president of Pyramid Inc., a kitchen appliance store. Magnacat possesses vast magical powers that allow him to shapeshift and control the minds of others. Magnacat intends to create an army of Androgorkas and enact revenge on Bibbur-Si, from which he was exiled long ago. After being eaten by Captain Bristlebeard, Magnacat is converted into living ooze. In this state, he is confined to a capsule to regain his body and strength. As a last resort, Magnacat orders Viziosed to get the Horn of Kong to summon the Monster-Saur. His control over the monster was not complete, however, and he formed a loose alliance with the Tamers to stop it. Zick and Elena escape, trapping Magnacat and Viziosed inside Monster-Saur's body.

In the second season of the animated series, Magnacat escapes along with Viziosed by absorbing the energy of Monster-Saur to confuse the Dombox into releasing them. He is defeated and sealed into a special Dombox designed to prevent him from escaping.

Magnacat is voiced by: Roberto Draghetti (Italian), Al Goulem (English).

==== Moog Magister ====
Moog Magister is one of the main antagonists in the second season of the animated series. He is the lord of the Anguane witches, with Emily as second-in-command. When Emily learns about the Hundred and First Door in the Ancient Armory, Magister kills Emily as she no longer has any use to him, and makes a deal with Sinistro. At the crypt, he uses his magical bag to get all the Domboxes, but quickly finds that it is a trap. After getting lost inside the Armory, Magister encounters Bombolo, who has eaten his magical bag, and pursues him through the Armory. Magister manages to obtain the key, which is destroyed because only a Tamer can wield it. He dies after falling into the lava.

In the comic book series, Magister plans to control a giant Gaiga monster called the No Name with a small device to summon it. When he finally controls the No Name, he quickly throws Emily into the sea and attacks Bibbur-Si. However, he is defeated by the young Tamers. No Name, famished by centuries of imprisonment, devours Magister.

==== Hector Sinistro ====
Hector Sinistro is a Dark Tamer, and one of the main antagonists in the second season of the animated series. He tries to get revenge against Zob, by attacking his son, Zick. In the past, he was a respected Tamer until he was discovered by Zob to be illegally selling captured monsters to the Anguanes. He was turned in and marked as a renegade Tamer or Dark Tamer and was banished from the Armory. Emily brought Sinistro to Moog Magister to help him get to the Ancient Armory by going through the Hundred and First Door. He agrees to help Magister to get Domboxes in the crypt so he can get the Scepter Dom. After obtaining the Scepter, Sinistro ends up succumbing to its power and is transformed into a monster.

In the comic book series, Sinistro is 783 years old and was imprisoned for life for his crimes against monsters. He is sinister by nature, turning his passion for the circus into a nightmare. After escaping prison, Sinistro kidnaps and exploits monsters to work in his circus. Sinistro gathers a group of Dark Tamers to attack the Ancient Armory and manages to kidnap Elena. He then forces Zick to give up all his Dom power to save Elena. However, Sinistro is overwhelmed by Dom energy, which kills him along with the other Dark Tamers.

Hector Sinistro is voiced by Leonardo Graziano (Italian).

=== Minor villains ===
==== Omnised and Omniquod ====
Omnised and Omniquod are Gorka brothers who act as Magnacat's minions. They sometimes fight each other over which one of them is right. They are able to assume human forms, retaining hair behind their ears.

==== Viziosed ====
Viziosed is a large, red Gorka who works for Magnacat. He secretly steals the Horn of Kong Teddy had taken from the Ancient Armoury and attempts to summon the Monster-Saur for his master. The horn did not work properly, however, as it lacked a pendant Teddy had taken, and Viziosed and Magnacat were attacked by the disobedient Monster-Saur. Zick traps the Monster-Saur in his Universal Dombox, trapping Magnacat and Viziosed with it.

Magnacat devours the Monster-Saur from the inside, allowing him and Viziosed to escape. Zick traps Magnacat using a special giant Dombox, while Viziosed was trapped by Trengingigan.

==== Dark Phantoms ====
Dark Phantoms are ghosts that are willing to gain life by eating monsters and Tamers. As they consume more. they become very destructive, and turn into living ghosts (half-monster, half-ghost).

These are the Dark Phantoms known in the series: Bristlebeard the pirate, Lester the night watchman with his dog Briba, the Blacksmith brothers, Baht Belasco and crewmen of the Unicorn, and two smugglers: Shooter and Jones.

==== Bristlebeard ====
Bristlebeard is the first Dark Phantom seen in the series, and the captain of the pirate ship "The Unicorn". He is summoned by Zick to help defeat Magnacat by eating him and his Androgorkas. Bristlebeard turns on Zick, but retreats when Zick overpowers him. Later on, he is tracked down by Zick and Elena to find his treasure to save Greta's Flower Shop. While searching for his treasure and fighting him, the two learn that Bristlebeard's real name is Horacio and that he once loved a woman named Olivia, who he has unsuccessfully tried to find again. Bristlebeard is defeated when Zick uses the Universal Dombox to dissolve his body.

Bristlebeard reappears in the second season, where he is summoned by Zick using the Voice Dom. He states that he reunited with Olivia again in the afterlife and no longer eats monsters.

==== Emily Vermeer ====
Emily Vermeer is Zick's aunt. She is very rich and uncaring to Zick's family. She later appears as the leader of the Anguanes, and is known to them as the Anguana of Er.

Emily reappears in the second season as an assistant of Moog Magister. Following a series of failures, the Anguanes try to please Magister by throwing a party to celebrate his 301st birthday, but Magister ends up destroying the party and plans to kill all the Anguanes for their failure. Magister kills Emily, seeing no more use for her.

==== Anguanes ====
The Anguanes are merchant witches who live in a hollow tree in the Forest of Cham. They capture monsters to make potions and spells, and completely follow their leader Emily Vermeer, also known as the Anguana of Er, as well as Moog Magister.

==== Black Fires ====
A Black Fire is a Dark Phantom that has reached the bottom of the abyss. Elena had awakened one of these creatures and endangered Bombo and Snyakutz Bu.

== Supporting characters ==
=== Zick's family ===
==== Greta Barrymore ====
Greta Barrymore is Zick's mother and lives with him in the Barrymore house. She owns a flower shop, and her husband is Zobedja Zick. She is friendly to anyone. She eavesdropped on Zick while he was first fighting Magnacat which lead her to reveal that she too can see monsters and ghosts. She hid this ability because didn't want her son to end up like his father.

In the comic book series, Greta is a loving mom and wife. She gives the gift of sight to Elena when Elena is being left out of saving Bibbur-Si from the Giga-Monster.

Greta is voiced by: Alessandra Korompay (Italian), Pauline Little (English).

==== Zobedja "Zob" Zick ====
Zobedja Zick is Zick's father and the husband of Greta Barrymore. He was shrunk after battling against Magnacat. He was returned to normal with the Breath of Mugalak. Elena and Zick convince Zob to share the cure with Terrence, who was turned to stone in the same incident. Greta and Johanna persuade him to get repair his relationship with Terrence even though he blames him for being shrunk for years, and he agrees to do it while going to Port Reef with the rest of the family.

Zob is voiced by: Andrea Ward (Italian), Mark Camacho (English).

==== Theo Barrymore and Tessa Grange ====
Theo and Tessa are Zick's maternal grandparents. At home, Zick is in continuous contact with the ghosts of grandparents, who often provide valuable suggestions and wise advice to their grandson. They were good friends with Ezeria and Maria Zick, Zick's paternal grandparents.

Theo and Tessa are voiced by: Pietro Ubaldi and Caterina Rochira (Italian).

==== Ezeria Zick and Maria Bertold ====
Ezeria and Maria are Zick's paternal grandparents. When Zob loses his powers, the Maximum Tutors decided to separate the Zick family by sending Ezeria and Maria to a Detention Oasis in Eilenou. They were good friends with Theo and Tessa and were upset that they died, but brightened when they saw their ghosts.

=== Monsters ===
==== Bombo ====
Bombo is a monster who lives in Zick's house under the supervision of Timothy and later Jeremy. His crime is ignoring his diet and stealing cakes. Bombo is afraid of Jeremy and in the animated series, has nightmares about Jeremy foiling his plans to steal Zick's shoes.

Bombo is voiced by Pietro Ubaldi (Italian), Rick Jones (English).

==== Snyakutz Bu ====
Snyakutz Bu is a monster who lives in Zick's house under the supervision of Timothy and later Jeremy. His crime is littering (leaving pieces of himself everywhere). He is Bombo's closest friend and accompanies him in stealing Zick's shoes.

Snyakutz Bu is voiced by Riccardo Peroni (Italian), Gordon Masten (English).

==== Clak-Ritak ====
Clak-Ritak is a Bobak who resides in the Barrymores' Detention Oasis. His crime is playing a violin horribly out of tune.

==== Ben-Talak ====
Ben-Talak is a Bobak who resides in the Barrymores' Detention Oasis. His crime is telling made-up stories and lying. Ben-Talak is voiced by Claudio Moneta (Italian).

==== Trengingigan ====
Trengingigan is a Gingi who sports an eyepatch and specializes in hunting Gorkas. He is introduced appeared when Zick and Timothy need help to stop Magnacat from making more Androgorkas. He appears later to help Zick to capture Omnised and Omniquod and to get hot cappuccino on Halloween. It is revealed that Trengingigan's eye is intact and that he only wears an eyepatch to appear more intimidating.

Trengingigan is voiced by Riccardo Rovatti (Italian).

==== Chumba Bagingi ====
Chumba Bagingi is one of the monsters under Lardine's Detention Oasis. He is an exhibitionist, a monster who makes himself visible to humans.

Chumba Bagingi is voiced by Claudio Moneta (Italian).

==== Bram-Bombak ====
Bram-Bombak is one of the teachers in the Ancient Armory in the animated series. He is an expert in Monsterology. He wears glasses and uses a magnifying glass, but still has a hard time seeing. Bram-Bombak is voiced by Rick Jones (English).

==== Bim-Bombak and Bobbabu ====
Bim-Bombak and Bobbabu are the chefs in the Ancient Armory.

Bim-Bombak and Bobbabu are voiced by Rick Jones and Terrence Scammell respectively, in the English version.

==== Bombolo ====
Bombolo is a baby Bombo. Elena decides to take care of him and to practice being a Keeper. In the episode "A Kingdom for Bombolo", he is crowned the prince of the Bombos. In the comic book series, Bombolo was given to Elena by Timothy.

Bombolo is voiced by Jodie Resther (English).

=== Tutors ===
==== Timothy-Moth ====
Timothy is Zick's cat and Tutor. He is very mysterious and sarcastic but a great help to Zick. He is in charge of the Detention Oasis of the Barrymores' house, and was temporarily replaced by Jeremy-Joth for violating the rules of Bibbur-Si.

Timothy is voiced by Oliviero Dinelli (Italian), Michel Perron (English).

==== Lardine ====
Her real name is Larraby Tuth, but prefers to be called by her nickname Lardine. She is the only female cat and Tutor seen in both the show and comic book series. She is in charge of the Detention Oasis at Port Reef.

Lardine is voiced by Cinzia Massironi (Italian).

==== Jeremy-Joth ====
Jeremy is the strictest of the four Maximum Tutors. He became Timothy's replacement when the latter violated too many rules of Bibbur-Si. He has controlled the Barrymores' house since then, being mean to both Zick and the monsters. In the second season of the animated series, he was in charge of the Ancient Armory.

Jeremy is voiced by Ambrogio Colombo (Italian), Terrence Scammell (English).

=== Tamers ===
==== Tadduja "Teddy" Thaur ====
Tadduja Thaur is a 14-year-old Tamer, and one of Zick's friends. He is a show-off, arrogant and boastful to anyone. He sometimes respects Zick, but not Elena, who he always calls Potato. He first appears to invite Zick to go hunt monsters in the abandoned factory. He helps Zick to defeat Lester the night watchman with his dog Briba and steals the Fouler that Zick is about to capture. He appears again to help Zick and Elena get information to get his father back to normal form. Emily uses him and Elena as a bargain chip by switching their bodies with the other Anguanes. They put aside their differences and manage to break and reverse the spell to return to their own bodies.

After Zick and Elena find the Breath of Mugalak, Teddy suddenly betrays them and steals it to cure his father, Terrence Thaur, of his petrified state. After explaining his motives, Teddy reconciles with Zick and his family.

In the first season, Teddy was a second level Tamer with yellow Dom energy. In the second season of the animated series, he became a third level Tamer with green Dom energy, and now a fourth level Tamer with blue Dom energy.

Teddy is voiced by Massimo di Benedetto (Italian), Daniel Brochu (English).

==== Terrentuja "Terrence" Thaur ====
Terrentuja Thaur is a Tamer, and Teddy's father. He is also a good friend of Zob. He first appeared in "Mugalak!", where he was turned into stone by Magnacat. In issue 13, Terrence was brought back to his normal size, but Zob did not trust him because of his betrayal in the past. This betrayal was that Terrence abandoned Zob in the middle of a battle against a Pipluor to save his own life. Terrence did not want Teddy to know this as this would shatter his admiration, so when Teddy and Zick arrived at the scene, Terrence told another lie. The four Tamers fought against each other only to be stopped by Elena. Terrence and Zob still disliked each other, but over time, the two set aside their differences and became friends once again.

Terrence is voiced by Claudio Moneta (Italian), Mark Hauser (English).

==== Johanna Thaur ====
Johanna Thaur is a Tamer and is Teddy's mother. She first appeared in "Mugalak!", where she was visited by Zob, Zick and Elena to cure her husband who had been turned into stone by Magnacat with the Breath of Mugalak. She later appears in episodes "Family Reunion", "The Return of Magnacat", "The Devourer", "The Great Escape", and "The Horn of Kong".

In the comic series, Johanna first appeared in issue 13, when Teddy and Zick arrived with the sponge with the Mugalak's breath. Johanna is a loving mother who cares about her son, despite the fact that he goes on adventures behind her back.

==== Lay Mamery ====
Lay is a 14-year-old Tamer, one of Zick's new friends. She is admired by the young male Tamers, including Teddy and Zick, a reason that Elena is a bit jealous of her. Lay is both fond of, and impressed by Zick for facing many monsters; on the contrary she sometimes does not like Teddy for being immature.

Lay's Tamer level is first level for firing red Dom energy, and in time she is now a fourth level Tamer.

==== Zai, Lyu, and Leniley Mamery ====
The Mamery Clan is the rest of Lay's family, all female Tamers, who aided Zob and the others in the battle against Magnacat in the first season.

Zai is a fifth level Tamer, and Lay's grandmother. In the second season, she is a nurse at the Ancient Armory.

Lyu is a third level Tamer, and Lay's younger sister. In the second season, she is a student with the other young Tamers at the Ancient Armory.

Leniley is a fifth level Tamer, and Lay's mother. In the second season, she is a nurse at the Ancient Armory.

==== Bobby Clash ====
Bobby is a fourth level Tamer in the Ancient Armory, and a new character in the second season of the animated series. He is very handsome and popular among the girls in the Armory, especially Elena and Lay, which made Zick a bit jealous of him. Later on in the series, he is a friend and partner to Teddy Thaur when fighting monsters, and he resides in the Armory and having his own Universal Dombox.

Bobby is voiced by Jodie Resther (English).

==== Paco, Paul and Raul Luseney ====
Paco is a fifth level Tamer with white Dom energy, and the father of Paul and RaulLuseney. In the TV series, he first appeared in the episode, "The Last Tamer", when he and the other Tamers were summoned by Zob to aid in taking down Magnacat. In the second season, he is a weapons training instructor at the Ancient Armory.

In the comic series, he debuted in issue 15, alongside his two sons, Paul and Raul.

Paul & Raul are twin brothers, fourth level Tamers, and sons of Paco Luseney. In Season 2, they are seen as students in the Ancient Armory, and assist the other Tamers on missions.

Paco is voiced by Marco Balzarotti (Italian), Paul & Raul are voiced by Jodie Resther and Holly Gauthier-Frankel (English).

==== Dan & Cal Tulasech ====
Dan is a fifth level Tamer with white Dom Energy, and the father of Cal. He is one of many good friends of Zob and an ally in the fight against Magnacat in "The Last Tamer". In the second season, he is a teacher at the Ancient Armory.

Cal is also a fifth level Tamer, and the son of Dan Tulasech. He is one of the many allies in the fight against Magnacat in "The Last Tamer". In the second season, he is a teacher at the Ancient Armory.

==== Wally Machaby ====
Wally is a female Tamer with fifth level Dom energy, and an ally of Zob. She first appeared in the first-season episode, "The Last Tamer", when Zob summons the other Tamers to aid him in the fight against Magnacat. In the second season, she is a weapons training instructor at the Ancient Armory.

=== Elena's family ===
==== Harvey Potato ====
Harvey is Elena's father, who moved to Oldmill Village with his family. He works as a supermarket manager.

Harvey is voiced by Lucio Saccone (Italian).

==== Julie Potato ====
Julie is Elena's mother, who moved to Oldmill Village with her husband and daughter. She gets mad at Elena when she finds out that she has done something wrong. Despite this, she still loves Elena. In the episode "The Horn of Kong", she gave birth to twins, a boy and a girl. In the comic series, Julie's children are named Charlie and Violet.

Julie is voiced by Gio'-Gio' Rapattoni (Italian).

==== Lonzo Potato ====
Lonzo is Elena's 8-year-old cousin. Elena has a strained relationship with him as he sometimes does weird things, such as acting like a cat to cheer her up when Purrcy was kidnapped. Since then, Elena goes to Zick's house to avoid him, every time he comes for a visit. When he sees Bombo and Synakutz Bu taking a picture of themselves and making themselves visible for a moment, Elena hears his scream, causing her to go help him with the situation, only to find his face getting misplaced after being eaten by Bombo. Lonzo gets excited by the world of monsters when Elena tells him about it.

In the comic book series, he is called Porter instead of Lonzo.

Lonzo is voiced by Irene Scalzo (Italian).

==== Purrcy ====
Purrcy is Elena's pet cat who always tries to make friends with Timothy and Jeremy, but ends up getting zapped or scratched in the face.

==== Puffy ====
Puffy is Elena's pet rabbit. Puffy has a prominent role in the episode "Claws", where he was transformed into a humanoid form by Omnised and Omniquad on Magnacat's orders. When Elena recognizes the creature as her pet, she calls him by name, causing him to regain control of himself. Puffy approaches Elena, who returns him to normal.

In the comic series, Puffy was transformed by the Mask of Fire. He is returned to normal when Zick captures him in a Dombox with lavender, a plant that is said to diminish monsters' and Tamers' powers.

=== Oldmill Village Elementary School ===
==== Patty Smirnov and Mattie O'Hare ====
Pattie and Mattie are the editors of the school paper, where they print gossip.

Patty and Mattie are voiced by Monica Bertolotti and Raffaella Castelli, respectively, in the original Italian version.

==== Soup and Ford ====
Soup and Ford are class bullies. They aren't very smart and they follow the orders of their 'leader' David. Soup and Ford are voiced by Cinzia Villari and Paolo Vivio, respectively, in the original Italian version.

==== David McMackamack ====
David is a bully like Soup and Ford and likes to pick on Zick, but he hides a sensitive side, which they would learn later on. In the comic book series, David would stutter while talking, which was left out of the animated series. Later on in the series, he befriends Annie.

David is voiced by Alessio Ward (Italian).

==== Annie Van Mousse ====
In the comic book series, Annie is shy and afraid of ghost stories, while in the animated series it was the opposite. It's implied that she is lactose intolerant, due to her fondness for soy-flavored soy ice cream.

==== Miss Petula Swift ====
Petula Swift is Zick and Elena's teacher in Oldmill Village Elementary School.

=== Other characters ===
==== Mr. Tobias ====
He is the owner of the Oldmill restaurant that Zick and Elena first suspected of kidnapping dogs in Oldmill.

==== Officer Jackson ====
She is a well known police officer in Oldmill and Big Burg. In the comic book and animated series, she has befriended Zick and Elena.

==== Digesting Plant ====
A plant monster that Timothy released to test Zick. After he tamed the monster, it completely follows and helps Zick and Elena.

== Monsters ==
=== Monster-Si ===
Monster-Si are good monsters who live in the Suspended City, which is controlled and protected by the Tutors. The Monster-Si follow the rules of their world, including the invisibility rule, and try to avoid being noticed by humans.

- Bobaks - They are monsters dedicated to study and cultural activities. Inspired, cool, and pensive, they love to show off their brilliance and knowledge. Their bodies are made of a jelly-like transparent substance that can change color according to their mood.
- Bombaks - They are hybrid offspring of a Bombo father and Bobak mother. They resemble Bombos, but have four eyes.
- Bombos - They are big, happy, gluttonous monsters. They often cannot control their appetite and devour almost anything, edible or not.
- Bursties - Bursties are bubble-like monsters who float in the air at the mercy of the wind. When they get scared, they explode, however they can reappear in a few minutes.
- Flyvans - They are winged monsters that are naturally aggressive, but can be domesticated: normally they go through a long training period so that they can be ridden.
- Gingis - Gingis are generally vain and hedonistic. They love compliments and cannot stand criticism of the way they wear their tentacles on their heads, something that makes them particularly angry. They love to look beautiful and love excess; they adore human fashion, from which they rob and collect objects and jewelry.
- Girtis - They are small, flying monsters that are sweet, gentle and fragile. However, they are hypersensitive and timid: they get frightened at nothing, fluttering madly in circles.
- Hahs - They are laughing monsters, who act as doctors in the monster world. According to them, anyone can cure illness with good humor, which has been studied and proposed in all its forms.
- Snyakutzes - Snyakutzes generally have multiple eyes and limbs. When they run, jump or move quickly in general, they can lose parts of their bodies, which can be easily reattached to them. As Snyakutzes age, their attachment ability diminishes.
- Varavans - They are monsters with the function of transporting other monsters around the streets.
- Vacuums - They are monsters with the function of transporting other monsters on the other skyscrapers, to arrive at the Suspended City.
- Zamurris - These are monsters that are joined with their nuclear family, sharing a body with one pair of legs.

=== Monster-Ska ===
Monsters-Ska are monsters who, by nature and choice, are absolutely evil, and live outside and far from the Suspended City (very often in the human world). The Monster-Ska do not follow monster society rules and for this reason they are a constant danger to the good monsters, the Monster-Si. Some types of Monster-Ska live alone, while others live in small and independent communities.

- Androgorkas - They are humans transformed into monsters by drinking the serum of invulnerability of the Gorkas, who control them with their mental powers and treat them like slaves.
- Big Bonz Eater - These monsters are big, bad-tempered Bombos, and they become horrendous and monstrous creatures that are capable of devouring practically everything, with their large mouths.
- Foulers - They are small monsters that live in dimly lit, dirty and messy areas. Foulers love rolling, crawling and wallowing in mold. If the environment they find themselves in is too clean, they quickly reduce that environment to suit their taste by generating filth.
- Gorkas - They are a dangerous race of monster not only for other monsters, but also for humans. They have the capacity to change shape to fit in their surroundings and can therefore easily mimic humans without following the invisibility rule. They also have the ability to control and manipulate minds.
- Mugalaks - Mugalaks are large, dragon-like monsters with the ability to breathe fire and expel deadly gas from the pores on their back. They are very intelligent beings, but equally lazy.
- Pipluors - They are enormous, semi-liquid monsters composed of jelly-like, flexible mass with hundreds of eyes. Pipluors hunt by covering prey with their bodies until they are engulfed.
- Squarks - Squarks are aquatic monsters who are ferocious, invisible and harmless to humans. They populate all bodies of water, from oceans to large rivers.
- Water Worms - They are monsters that mainly live in water, their natural environment; however as amphibians, they can also easily move around on land. Shaped like snakes, their bodies are very long, flexible and suitable for swimming and slithering.

=== The Tutors ===
Tutors are monsters who are very intelligent and authoritative by nature, so as to have assumed a supervisory role over the other monsters of the Suspended City, and protect them from the Monster-Ska and the dangers of the world of humans.

- Guard Tutors - They have the task of enforcing the law on all monsters in the Suspended City, and they strictly obey the Maximum Tutors.
- Maximum Tutors - They have the highest authority, and represent the law and govern the world of monsters. In the Suspended City, the most powerful among them are the Great Council.
- Natural Tutors - These Tutors are sent into the world of humans, where they take the form of cats. They are in charge of monitoring the operation of the Detention Oasis, by protecting and re-educating the monster prisoners.
- Stellar Tutors - These are Tutors given to those who are honored and merit in experience, regardless of the position.

=== The Gaiga-Monsters ===
Gaiga-Monsters are species of monsters that roamed during ancient times, bent on massacre and destruction. They were invisible, and very lethal to humans, who thought their destruction came from earthquakes and hurricanes, and they were feared even by the Monster-Ska. They were sent to the deepest bowels of the earth by the alliance between Tamers and Tutors.

- Blind Eye and Blood of the Earth - These two monsters attack together with different styles. Blood of the Earth can see a long distance and guides Blind Eye, which is swift, but blind.
- Magmalon the Flagellator - A giant stingray-like monster that acts as a transport to the Shadow of the Abysses. It can fire rays from its mouth, and releases Magmillions to attack or to protect the Magmalon.
- Magmillions - They are small versions of the Magmalon. These monsters attack in swarms and will eat anything in their path.
- Shadow of the Abysses - A gigantic monster that can climb though the skyscraper very quickly, but it needs the Magamalon to travel faster.
- The No Name - A gigantic monster that is stated to be indestructible and unstoppable, causing tidal waves when it moves. The only weakness of this monster is that is will devour itself if it eats too much Energy Dom.
- Tulkamans - A slug-like monster with seven eyes that is deaf, making it immune to the Voice Dom. Its saliva is white-hot and acidic, melting anything it touches.

=== Other monsters ===
They are some monsters that were not categorized as Monster-Si or Monster-Ska, but they are unique. Some of these monsters are peaceful, dangerous, and extinct.

- Bommerbang - An ancient monster who became extinct long ago. It has the ability to fly and can breathe fire from its mouth. This monster is so dangerous to fight directly that the Tamers use a self-catching Dombox, using maggots as bait since it is the monster's favorite food.
- Chameleon - A lizard-like monster that is very quick and can climb on anything. It has the ability to hide in different containers, but is weakened if it hides too much.
- Digesting Plant - A plant-like monster that eats almost anything that it sees. It becomes very friendly once tamed.
- Gragnock - A iguana-like monster that can climb though anything and moves quickly. This monster is strong, and it uses its tongue and tails as an attack on its enemies.
- Grunts - Grunts are bold and malicious monsters who love gaining luxury and wealth, and mostly take great pleasure at scaring humans by ignoring the invisibility rule.
- Kamalus - These are rare birds with colorful feathers, and they are only friendly to Bombos. If a baby Bombo takes a feather from their nest, it becomes the king of the Bombos.
- Megarock - A giant worm-like monster that lives underground and feeds off minerals. They can burrow quickly to move faster.
- Melter - A monster whose body is made of heated rocks. It can release fire from its body that can melt or burn anything around it.
- Monster-Saur - A gigantic monster that is very powerful and dangerous to fight alone. It uses its teeth, claws, tail, and fiery breath to attack its enemies. The Monster-Saur can only be tamed and controlled using the Horn of Kong.
- Polypolipo - An enormous squid-like monster that is considered to be the most dangerous of all the monsters. It lives deep in the swamp, and uses its giant tentacles to attack or devour enemies.
- Purpidoch - An enormous aquatic spider-like predator that is harmless to humans, but is lethal to all monsters. It lives underwater, and then resurfaces to hunt monsters by spitting web from its mouth to catch prey.
- River Monsters - These peaceful monsters live in the rivers, and they act as transportation by following the Tamers with their Voice Dom.
- Rooge - An ancient monster resembling a butterfly or bird that was thought to be extinct long ago. It has the ability to suck life energy by firing a ray from its mouth.
- Sluggos - Sluggos are shapeshifting monsters similar to Gorkas. They create toxic slime that can melt any substance, which can be solidified by the Energy Dom.
- Sphinx - An ancient monster that can fly and turn anything, even Dom items, into dust. It can only be stopped by using the Gesture Dom.
