= Monster Allergy (TV series) =

- Genre: Action; Adventure; Comedy-horror; Urban fantasy; Science fiction
- Created by: Katja Centomo; Francesco Artibani; Alessandro Barbucci; Barbara Canepa
- Written by: Francesco Artibani; Bruno Enna; Earl Kress; Anne-Marie Perrotta; Tean Schultz; Kurt Weldon
- Directed by: Iginio Straffi
- Creative directors: Marco Storani; Michel Rodrigues
- Voices of: (Zick, Elena, Bombo and Timothy-Moth) (Italian version): Monica Ward (Both Zick and Elena); Pietro Ubaldi; Oliviero Dinelli; (French version): Olivier Martret; Caroline Combes; Michel Elias; (Both Bombo and Timothy-Moth) (German version) (unknown) (English version): Holly Gauthier-Frankel; Annie Bovaird; Rick Jones; Michel Perron; Gordon Masten; Terrence Scammell; Mark Camacho
- Theme music composer: Mike Shields; Hal Beckett; Scott Bucsis; William Anderson; Matt Ouimet
- Composers: Roberto Belelli; Francesco Sardella; Michele Bettali; Stefano Carrara; Michele Bettali; Stefano Carrara; Fabrizio Castania
- Countries of origin: Italy; France; Germany
- Original languages: Italian; English; German; French
- No. of seasons: 2
- No. of episodes: 52 (list of episodes)

Production
- Executive producers: Joanne Lee (Rainbow S.p.A.); Philippe Delarue (Futurikon); Annita Romanelli (Rai); Natalie Altmann (M6); Nicole Keeb (ZDF)
- Producer: Iginio Straffi
- Animators: Hosem Animation Studios; Jiang Toon Animation; Philippine Animation Studio; Xy International Studio
- Editors: Beatrice Latini; Giorgia Tranquilli
- Running time: 30 minutes
- Production companies: Rainbow S.p.A.; Futurikon; Rai Fiction; ZDF

Original release
- Network: Rai 2 (Italy); KiKa (Germany); M6 (France)
- Release: 23 September 2006 – 18 August 2009

Monster Allergy is an animated television series co-created by Katja Centomo, Francesco Artibani, Alessandro Barbucci, and Barbara Canepa, based on the Italian comic book series of the same name. It was jointly produced by Futurikon, Rainbow, M6, Rai Fiction, and ZDF. It was initially broadcast on Rai 2 in Italy, and later aired on M6 in France, on KiKa in Germany, on YTV in Canada, and on Kids' WB in the United States.

Two seasons of 52 episodes total were produced.

Beginning on 13 March 2018, the series has been officially made available for streaming on YouTube.

== Plot ==
Monster Allergy is based on a comic book series of the same name. The series follows a young boy Ezekiel Zick (nicknamed Zick) who suffers from various allergies and has the ability to see the invisible monsters that live among humans. Along with help of his best friend, Elena Potato, and his talking cat, Timothy, Zick hopes to hone his powers to one day become a Monster Tamer like his father Zobedja.

== Episodes ==
| Season | Episodes | Originally released | |
| Season | Episodes | First released | Last released |
|---|---|---|---|
| Pilot | | January 31, 2009 | |
| 1 | 26 | September 23, 2006 | January 20, 2008 |
| 2 | 26 | December 27, 2008 | August 18, 2009 |

== Tamer ==
Tamers are beings with special powers; their main characteristic is the Dom, an energy that is passed from parent to child. With the passing of the generations, powers and knowledge are passed on which lead to real dynasties of Monster Tamers.

The five Dom powers are:

- Sight Dom - Allows the user to see monsters and ghosts, who are otherwise invisible.
- Voice Dom - Allows the user to force monsters and phantoms to obey their commands.
- Gesture Dom - Allows the user to control monsters by gesture and capture them in a DomBox.
- Enviro Dom - Allows the user to create a force field that allows them to survive in otherwise dangerous environments.
- Energy Dom - Allows the user to release beams of energy.

=== Dom Items ===
The Dom Items are valuable items that are given by the Tutors to experienced Tamers.

- Universal DomBox - A gun-like container used by Tamers, it can capture any monster and multiple ones.
- Zick's Sunglasses - Zick's glasses amplify the power of his Energy Dom.
- Dom Glove - This item improves the power levels of a Tamer for every four monsters they capture.
- Regular DomBox - Special boxes used to hold a captured monster. There are different types of DomBoxes for each monster.
- Tele-skates - The Tele-skates are given to a Tamer along with the Green Gem. They can teleport the user anywhere of their choosing.
- Dom Staff - This Dom weapon amplifies the Tamer's Energy Dom by firing a strong ray beam through the staff.
- Hypno-Disk - This device is used to erase and alter memories.
- Crystallizator - This device is mainly used for freezing monsters when a Dombox is not available.
- Radio-Worm - A wristband that acts as a tracking device. It makes a loud screeching noise when the wearer tries to remove it.
- Disco-Monster - A gun-like device that forces a monster to dance. This makes a monster exhausted so it can be captured easily.
- Densifier - The Densifier is able to alter the user's density, making them either very heavy or light enough to become intangible.
- Scepter Dom (ZetaDom Stick) - A wand with the ability to control monsters at will. If the scepter is used too much, it becomes uncontrollable and the user is transformed into a monster as a side effect.

== Broadcast ==
In Italy, Monster Allergy premiered on 6 February 2006 on Rai 2.

In France, the series premiered on M6 (a co-producer of the series) on 18 October 2006 as part of its M6 Kid strand.

In the United States, the series premiered on 23 September 2006 on Kids' WB television block broadcast on the affiliates of The CW network. It was shown with scenes edited or cut for time constraints and due to censorship, and the airing order did not follow production order. The series was later made available in its unaltered English dub to watch on Netflix.

== Reception ==
For Common Sense Media, Emily Ashby gave Monster Allergy a mixed review. She wrote that "cartoon violence (explosions, laser blasts from eyes) is commonplace throughout the show" and that it "exists mostly as TV fluff."
