= Water & Bubbles =

- Created by: Guido Manuli
- Country of origin: Italy
- No. of episodes: 52

Production
- Running time: 3 minutes
- Production company: Maga Animation Studio

Original release
- Network: Rai 2
- Release: 24 December 2007 – 2021

Water & Bubbles (Acqua in bocca) is an Italian animated television series. It was designed by Elena Mora and Guido Manuli and directed by the same Manuli. The third season of the series was the first animated TV series in stereoscopic 3D ever produced in Italy.

== Plot ==
Pippo is a sweet, naïve fish who has always lived with the Caragutis and their two adolescent children, Sara and Chris. Then one day he is joined in the tank by Palla, a fish who has seen the world, but never anything like these bizarre teenage beings. Together with pippo (and us), he observes the Caraguti's puzzling, entertaining and, in the end, quite realistic behaviour, making for three minutes of gags, wisecracks and kids going through the struggle of growing up, plus and a close underwater friendship.

== See also ==
- List of Italian television series
