= Monster Allergy =

Italian comic book series

- Cover of issue #1

Publication information
- Publisher: Buena Vista Comics; Panini Comics
- Format: Comic book series
- Genre: Action-adventure, comedy-horror, urban fantasy, science fiction
- Publication date: October 3, 2003
- No. of issues: 35

Creative team
- Created by: Katja Centomo; Francesco Artibani; Alessandro Barbucci; Barbara Canepa
- Written by: Francesco Artibani
- Inker(s): Cristina Giorgilli; Daniela Vetro
- Colorist(s): Pamela Brughera; Barbara Canepa
- Editor: Sun Productions

Monster Allergy is an Italian comic book series created by Alessandro Barbucci, Katja Centomo, Francesco Artibani and Barbara Canepa of Sky Doll. Barbucci and Canepa had previously co-created the W.I.T.C.H. comic series. Monster Allergy lasted 29 issues; however, it is still in the course of reprints in newspaper stands on the 13th of every month. In 2008, Barbara Canepa stated that she and her co-creators gained back the copyright to Monster Allergy after its first publishing run.

On 24 May 2015, Tunué announced the new edition of the complete comic book, in two volumes of over 700 pages each, including a final unpublished episode.

A sequel series titled Monster Allergy Evolution began in 2016.

== Plot ==
Monster Allergy details the adventures of Elena Potato, who moves with her family to Old Mill Village, and Ezekiel Zick, whose father is missing and is affected by all sorts of allergies including one that allows him to see monsters. Together, they uncover the secrets of the world of monsters. Zick and Elena face terrible danger and enemies, which they are usually able to overcome. They are aided by Timothy-Moth, Zick's "cat", who is actually a kind of monster called a Tutor. Timothy oversees the monsters who live in Zick's house which is an oasis for criminal monsters.

Monster Allergy Evolution follows the adventures of Zick and Elena in college, where they eventually enter into a romantic relationship.

== Chapters ==
In the Philippines, Singapore, Malaysia, and other countries, Monster Allergy was published as a comic magazine last September 2004. However, Summit Media (the publisher of Monster Allergy in the Philippines) stopped publishing Monster Allergy at the 14th issue. In Malaysia, it stopped publishing it at the 27th issue. Chuang Yi Singapore finished publishing it until the 29th issue, the last of the comic book series. The comic book titles are quite different from the television series titles. Every issue contains a 44-page Monster Allergy story except the 30th issue that has 30 pages.

=== The Beginning ===
- 1. The House of Monsters

=== Magnacat ===
- 2. The Pyramid of the Invulnerable / The Pyramid of Invulnerability
- 3. The Mystery of Mister Magnacat
- 4. The Suspended City

=== The Monster Thrills ===
- 5. The Stellar Tutor
- 6. Here Comes Charlie Schuster
- 7. Pickled Monsters
- 8. The Keeper of the Lighthouse
- 9. The Return of Zob
- 10. Inside the Hollow Tree
- 11. The Anguanas of Er

=== Meet the Thaurs ===
- 12. The Other Tamer
- 13. The Mask of Fire
- 14. Together Again

=== Deep in the Monster World ===
- 15. The Ancient Armoury
- 16. Stormy Weather
- 17. The Last Anchor
- 18. The Lost Monsters
- 19. The Great Escape
- 20. Mushrooms and Chestnuts

=== New Adventures ===
- 21. A Trip to Kalamaludu-Si
- 22. The Two Sisters
- 23. The Form of the Shadow
- 24. Sinistro's Circus
- 25. The Invaders
- 26. The Fall of the Barrymore House
- 27. The Eye of Maggoth
- 28. The 101st Door / The Hundredth and First Door
- 29. Only for Elena

=== The Ending ===
- 30. The Tamer Cemetery

=== Monster Allergy Evolution ===
- 31. Domolacrum
- 32. The Valley of the Bombos
- 33. Do Not Kill
- 34. Ariadne's Thread
- 35. The Voice of the Shadow

== Merchandises and other media ==
=== Trading card game ===
A trading card game based on the same name was created by Upper Deck Company. It contains 110 collectible cards to play. Art was done by Blason Studio.

=== Video game ===
A 3D action adventure PC game was developed Artematica Entertainment in 2006. Copies of the game were given away in cereal boxes in Italy

=== Television series ===
An animated series based on the comics was jointly produced by Futurikon, Rainbow, M6, Rai Fiction and ZDF. It was broadcast on Rai 2 in Italy, on Nickelodeon in The Netherlands and Belgium, on KiKa in Germany, on M6 in France, on YTV in Canada, and on Kids' WB in the United States.
