= Claudio Moneta =

Italian voice actor (born 1967)

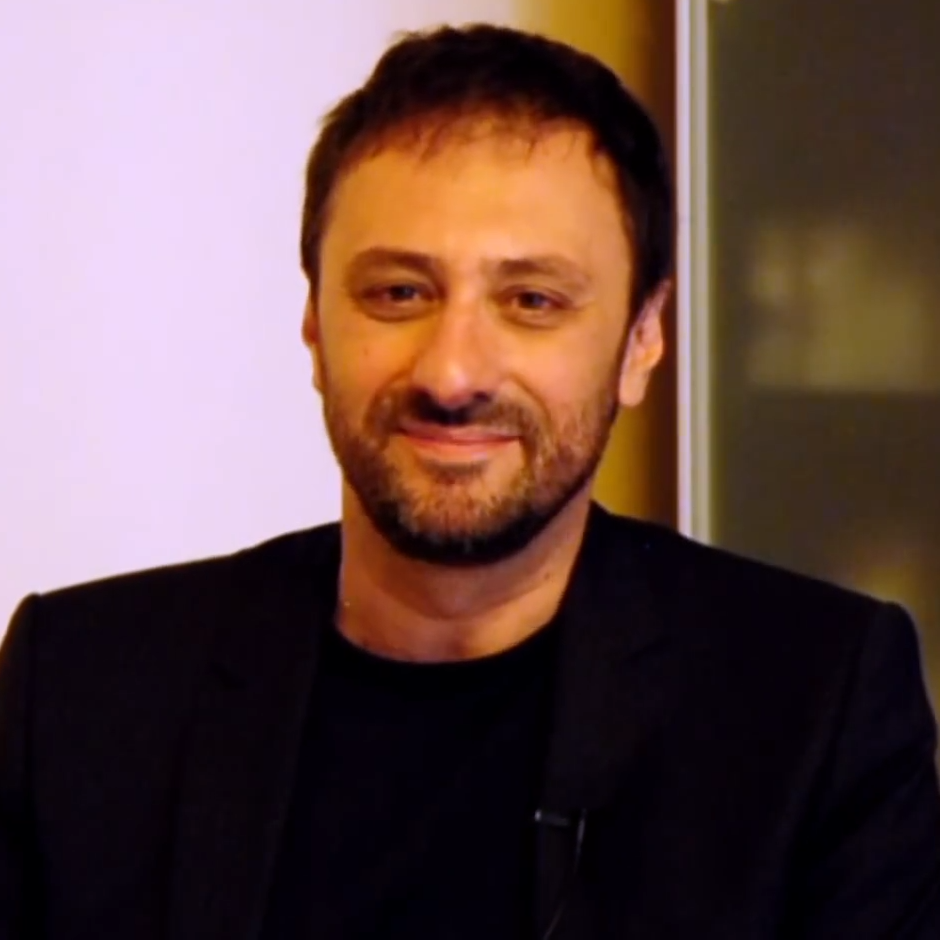
- Claudio Moneta in 2015
- Born: May 20, 1967 (age 59); Milan, Italy
- Occupations: actor; voice actor; dubbing director; TV host; stage director

Claudio Moneta (born 20 May 1967) is an Italian voice actor.

He voiced multiple characters in the internationally-coproduced animated series Monster Allergy and is well known in Italy for dubbing the voice of the title character in the Italian language version of the Nickelodeon animated series SpongeBob SquarePants and also Barney Stinson, portrayed by Neil Patrick Harris, in the sit-com How I Met Your Mother, Kakashi Hatake in Naruto and Naruto: Shippuden, Shadow the Hedgehog in the Sonic franchise, and Son Goku in Dragon Ball Super. The role of Kakashi Hatake was temporarily filled by fellow voice actor Gianluca Iacono between 2010 and 2011, due to a motorbike incident suffered by Moneta. He was also replaced in Mass Effect 2 because of that accident as well.

He has worked at Merak Film, Deneb Film, and other dubbing studios in Italy. Moneta is also the network announcer for the Mediaset owned channel Hiro.

== Voice work ==
- Yellow Wolf in Pocahontas: Princess of the American Indians - animated series (1997)
- The Clown and Every Mad in Cocco Bill - animated series (2000-2004)
- Additional voices in Johan Padan a la descoverta de le Americhe (film) - animated film (2001)
- Innkeeper, jailer and Varnye in Blood & Lace - video game (2001)
- Terrence Thaur, Ben-Talak, Chumba Bagingi in Monster Allergy - animated series (2005)
- Klaus in Winx Club - Animated series (2009-2019)
- Mr. Coldber and Alfredo in Calimero - animated series (2014)
- Dissanguatore/Dranghenstein and Jack Lamouche in Adrian - animated series (2019)
- Topo Gigio in Topo Gigio - animated series (2020)
- Aran Herionilli in Dragonero - I Paladini - TV series (2022-2023)

=== Dubbing ===
==== Animation ====
- Various characters in Batman: The Animated Series, The New Batman Adventures, Pokémon, My Hero Academia
- Erik the Red, Iceman/Bobby Drake, Mastermind (Jason Wyngarde) and other characters in X-Men: The Animated Series
- Falcon in The Avengers: United They Stand
- World Tournament Announcer in the 2nd Italian dub of Dragon Ball, Dragon Ball Z, Dragon Ball GT
- Tex Avery in Tex Avery Show
- Zarbon in DragonBall Z
- Dr. Mashirit in Dr. Slump (second dub, 1980/86 series)
- SpongeBob SquarePants and other voices in SpongeBob SquarePants, The SpongeBob SquarePants Movie, The SpongeBob Movie: Sponge on the Run, Saving Bikini Bottom: The Sandy Cheeks Movie, The Patrick Star Show
- Boss and Yumetaro Haruna in Hamtaro
- Keto in Nurse Angel Ririka SOS
- Pegasus in Yu-Gi-Oh! Duel Monsters and Yu-Gi-Oh! Duel Monsters GX
- Wheeler, Czar, and Atticus Rhode in Yu-Gi-Oh! GX
- Cooler in Dragon Ball Z: Cooler's Revenge, Dragon Ball Z: The Return of Cooler
- Bommer in Yu-Gi-Oh! 5D's
- IV in Yu-Gi-Oh! Zexal
- Kakashi Hatake in Naruto, Naruto: Shippuden (1st voice), Naruto the Movie: Ninja Clash in the Land of Snow
- Goku and Black Goku in Dragon Ball Super, Goku in Dragon Ball Super: Broly, Dragon Ball Super: Super Hero
- Tuxedo Mask in Sailor Moon (Viz Media redub)
- Rob Lucci, Mr. 3 (episode 424 onwards), Vergo, Fullbody and other voices in One Piece
- Ryōma in Fūma no Kojirō
- Captain Knuckles in The Marvelous Misadventures of Flapjack
- Mr. Fox in Franklin and Friends
- Verminious Snaptrap in T.U.F.F. Puppy
- Souga in Legends of the Dark King
- Nick Logan in Roswell Conspiracies: Aliens, Myths and Legends
- Major Glory in Dexter's Laboratory
- Elvis Cridlington in Fireman Sam (2004 series)
- Defoe in Huntik: Secrets & Seekers
- Jolly in Candy Land: The Great Lollipop Adventure
- Paulie Pretztail in Viva Piñata
- Ed in Best Ed
- Buck in Tomodachi Life: The TV Series
- Sakuragi in Perfect Blue
- Jubei Kibagami in Ninja Scroll
- Anatole in Anatole
- Ryo Asuka in Devilman
- Simon Schulz in Maya & Miguel
- Gargoyle in Nadia: The Secret of Blue Water (2nd dub)
- Tommy Parker in Sarah Lee Jones (3rd voice)
- Zorro in Kaiketsu Zorro
- Takenori Akagi in Slam Dunk
- Kazuma Kuwabara in Yu Yu Hakusho
- Kisuke Urahara in Bleach: Memories of Nobody
- Adon Koborwitz in Berserk
- Diabolik in Saban's Diabolik
- Andy Bogard in Fatal Fury: King of Fighters
- Vincent Blueno in Full Metal Panic! The Second Raid
- Niju in Balto II: Wolf Quest
- Kirby in Balto III: Wings of Change
- Dr. Harvey in The Spooktacular New Adventures of Casper
- The Cat in the Hat in The Cat in the Hat Knows a Lot About That!
- Doctor Doom in Fantastic Four: World's Greatest Heroes
- Dr. Joeb in Mix Master
- Muzan Kibutsuji in Demon Slayer: Kimetsu no Yaiba
- Glenn Dolphman in Inside Job (2021)

==== Live action ====
- Ted Franklin in iCarly
- Jeff Singer in Unfabulous and in The Hughleys
- Daryl Hughley in The Hughleys
- Barney Stinson in How I Met Your Mother
- Michael Frank in Lüthi und Blanc
- Gilles in Clara Sheller (Season 2)
- Aristide in Premiers Baisers
- Billy Alan Thomas in Ally McBeal
- John Pollock in Missing
- Jackson Greene in USA High
- Stuart Bondek in Spin City
- Julien Lemaître in Élodie Bradford
- Peter Johnson in McLeod's Daughters
- Ram Peters in Nip/Tuck
- Shadow the Hedgehog in Sonic the Hedgehog 3

==== Video games ====
- Arthas Menethil in Warcraft
- Commander Shepard in Mass Effect, Mass Effect 3
- Chris Redfield in Resident Evil: Revelations, Resident Evil 6, Resident Evil 7: Biohazard, Resident Evil Village
- Rikimaru in Tenchu 2: Birth of the Stealth Assassins, Tenchu: Wrath of Heaven
- Nomad in Crysis
- Hendrik Schmutz and other characters in Hitman: Blood Money
- Sergeant Major Jefferson and other characters in Act of War: Direct Action
- Michael Corleone in The Godfather II
- Mysterio in Spider-Man 2
- Wolverine in Ultimate Spider-Man
- Shen in League of Legends
- Sam The Rabbit, in the late 1990s videogame named Forestia
- Sir Nevalle and Koraboros in Neverwinter Nights 2
- Jak in Jak II, Jak 3 and Jak X: Combat Racing
- SpongeBob SquarePants in SpongeBob SquarePants: Creature from the Krusty Krab and Nicktoons: Battle for Volcano Island
- Darth Maul in Star Wars Battlefront II
- Darth Maul, Old Luke Skywalker, Bode, Captain Panaka in Lego Star Wars: The Skywalker Saga
- Shadow the Hedgehog since Mario & Sonic at the Sochi 2014 Olympic Winter Games
- Hermit and Malefor the Dark Master in The Legend of Spyro: Dawn of the Dragon
- Viktor Reznov in Call of Duty: Black Ops
- King Riccardo in Assassin's Creed
- Minor characters in Batman: Arkham City
- Trigger Happy in Skylanders: Spyro's Adventure, Skylanders: Giants
- Thomas Angelo in Mafia: The City of Lost Heaven
