= Lodolo =

Lodolo is a surname. Notable people with the surname include:

- Massimo Lodolo (born 1959), Italian actor and voice actor
- Nick Lodolo (born 1998), American professional baseball pitcher
