= Gianluca Iacono =

Italian voice actor

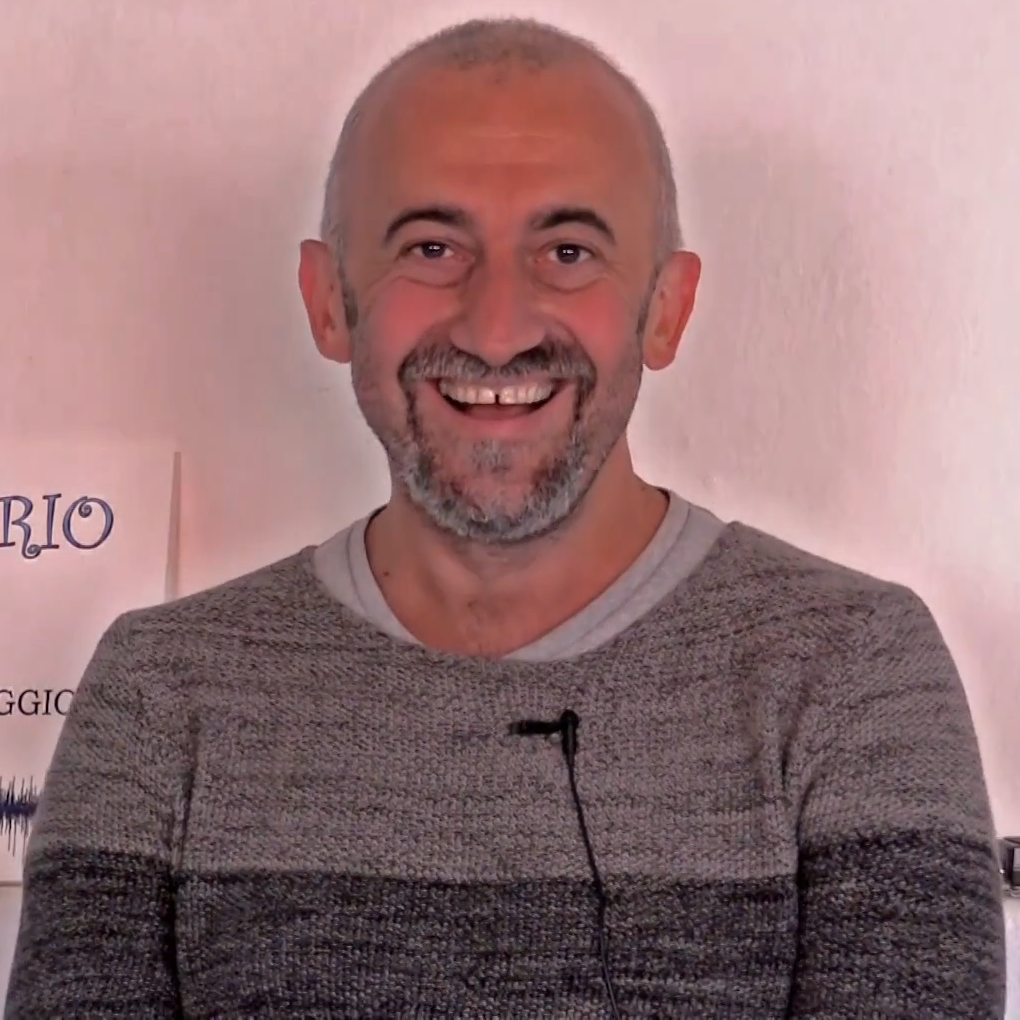
- Occupation: Voice actor

Gianluca Iacono is an Italian voice actor.

He has dubbed Vegeta in the Italian version of the Dragon Ball franchise, Genghis in The Wacky World of Tex Avery and Roy Mustang in Fullmetal Alchemist.

In 2005, Iacono took part in the internationally coproduced animated series Monster Allergy.

Between 2010 and 2011, he temporarily replaced Claudio Moneta, who had been injured in a motorbike accident, as the Italian voice of Kakashi Hatake in Naruto: Shippuden.

Iacono has worked at Deneb Film, Studio P.V., Merak Film, Studio ASCI and other dubbing studios in Italy.

== Voice work ==
- Paruto Porro and Bob Mondey in Monster Allergy
- Voice-over in Summer Cooking con Csaba
- Additional voices in Adrian

=== Dubbing ===
==== Animation ====
- Vegeta in Dragon Ball Z, Dragon Ball GT and Dragon Ball Super
- Tambourine and Gogeta in Dragon Ball Z
- Donbe in Dr. Slump (second dub, 1980/86 series)
- Genghis in The Wacky World of Tex Avery
- Various characters in Pokémon
- Gamakitchi and Mizuki in Naruto
- Kakashi Hatake (episodes 72–104), Mizuke (episode 251), Rasa and Choji Akimichi (both in episode 451) in Naruto: Shippuden
- Scoutmaster Lumpus in Camp Lazlo
- Gonard in Kappa Mikey
- Elias Van Dahl in W.I.T.C.H.
- Reed Richards/Mr. Fantastic in Fantastic Four: World's Greatest Heroes
- Bane in The New Batman Adventures
- Firefly in The Batman
- Green Arrow in Batman: The Brave and the Bold
- Mason Brown in Bakugan: Gundalian Invaders
- R Grey in Sgt. Frog
- Prowl in Transformers Animated
- Lance Alvers in X-Men: Evolution
- Ryuji Otogi in Yu-Gi-Oh!
- Adrian Gecko, Slade Princeton, and other characters in Yu-Gi-Oh! GX
- Lenny and Zigzix in Yu-Gi-Oh! 5D's
- Viscount Lerajie in Chrono Crusade
- Tomoka in Shin Hakkenden
- Igneous in Spider Riders
- Langston Lickatoadin Viva Piñata
- Masahiro Hamasaki in Mermaid Melody Pichi Pichi Pitch
- Shunsuke in Tokyo Mew Mew
- Garuda Aiacos in Saint Seiya
- Kaien Cross in Vampire Knight
- Tres Iqus in Trinity Blood
- Baptistin in Gankutsuou: The Count of Monte Cristo
- Otaki Aoyama in Ah! My Goddess: The Movie
- Go in Prétear
- Shun Tojo in Corrector Yui
- Roy Mustang in Fullmetal Alchemist and Fullmetal Alchemist: Brotherhood
- Ord in Dragon Tales
- Ryu in Shaman King
- Kyuzo in Samurai 7
- Take and Nakamaru in Saishu Heiki Kanojo
- Chip Oblong in The Oblongs
- Leo Trench in Odd Job Jack
- Harry/Stormy Weathers in Scooby-Doo! and the Legend of the Vampire
- Haohmaru in Samurai Shodown: The Motion Picture
- Rhesus 2 in Captain Simian & the Space Monkeys
- Dracula in ChalkZone
- Red in Captain Laserhawk: A Blood Dragon Remix
- Commeson and Vegeth in Dragon Ball Super
- Shibata in Tokyo Private Police

==== Live action ====
- Marshall Eriksen in How I Met Your Mother
- Dr. Merrill Bobolit and Brendan McNamara in Nip/Tuck
- Hector Lopez in Becker
- Neville Watson in Where I Live
- Vince D'Amata in Hang Time
- Joe Wylee in Flash Gordon
- Dozer in Angela's Eyes
- Angus in The Mystic Knights of Tir Na Nog
- Elliot Sacks in This Is Wonderland
- Nick Biancavilla in Strong Medicine
- Beowulf in Beowulf & Grendel
- Undercover Brother/Anton Jackson in Undercover Brother
- Álex in REC
- Detective Cho Yong-koo in Memories of Murder
- Soz in Dead Man's Shoes
