= Marco Balzarotti =

Italian voice actor

- Born: 2 March 1961 (age 65); Magenta, Italy
- Occupation: Voice actor
- Years active: 1982–present
- Website: www.marcobalzarotti.it/

Marco Balzarotti (born 2 March 1961 in Magenta) is an Italian voice actor.

Balzarotti voiced multiple characters in the internationally coproduced animated series Monster Allergy and is well known among the Italian public for dubbing Batman since the 1992 animated series and its sequels, mainly voiced in English by Kevin Conroy. He also provides the voice of the character Tuxedo Kamen in the Italian-language version of Sailor Moon and Asuma Sarutobi in the Italian-language versions of Naruto and Naruto: Shippuden.

He has worked at Merak Film, Studio Asci, Raflesia, and other dubbing studios in Italy.

== Voice work ==
- Le avventure del Piccolo Mugnaio Bianco - Animated series and TV commercials (1982–1988) - Piccolo Mugnaio and Narrator
- Il gioco del kamasutra - Video game (1997) - Commander, Shiva, Indian
- Pocahontas: Princess of the American Indians - Animated series (1998) - Sincere Feather
- Cocco Bill - Animated series (2000–2004) - Various characters
- Blood & Lace - Video game (2001) - Journalist
- Monster Allergy - Animated series (2005) - Paco Luseney, Omniquod, Bristlebeard, Captain
- Foot 2 Rue - Animated series (2005–2009) - Crono
- Gormiti - Animated series (2008) - Obscurio
- Slash:// - animated series (2011) - Dog #1
- Calimero - animated series (2014) - Mayor, Pirou
- Adrian - Animated series (2019) - Head of Government
- Enotria: The Last Song - Video game (2024) - Spaventa

=== Dubbing ===
==== Animation ====
- D in Vampire Hunter D, Vampire Hunter D: Bloodlust
- Daisuke Jigen in The Castle of Cagliostro (2nd Italian dub), Mystery of Mamo (3rd Italian dub)
- Bruce Wayne/Batman in Batman: The Animated Series, The New Batman Adventures, Batman & Mr. Freeze: SubZero, Static Shock, Batman: Mystery of the Batwoman, Justice League, Justice League Unlimited, The Batman, The Batman vs. Dracula, Batman: Gotham Knight, Batman: The Brave and the Bold
- Mamoru Chiba/Tuxedo Mask in Sailor Moon
- Commantis in Creepy Crawlers
- Jacques in Scooby-Doo on Zombie Island
- Wolfgang Krauser in Fatal Fury 2: The New Battle
- Jubei Yagyu in Samurai Shodown: The Motion Picture
- Dr. Bruce Banner/Hulk in The Incredible Hulk
- Carl "Crusher" Creel / Absorbing Man and Namor in The Avengers: United They Stand
- Suppaman and Shu in Dragon Ball
- Captan Ginyu and Cell game commentator in Dragon Ball Z
- Shu and Don Kir in Dragon Ball GT
- Kuzan/Aokiji, Dalton, Largo, Spandam, Happa, and Wetton in One Piece
- Phantom Virus in Scooby-Doo and the Cyber Chase
- Alex Brisbane, Paul McGregor, and Mr. Ishtar in Yu-Gi-Oh!
- Russell/Dark Skull in Scooby-Doo! and the Legend of the Vampire
- Asuma Sarutobi in Naruto, Naruto: Shippuden
- Soutetsu Kazahana in Naruto the Movie: Ninja Clash in the Land of Snow
- Minotaur in Blue Dragon, Blue Dragon: Trial of the Seven Shadows
- Jack Fenton in Danny Phantom
- Drago in Bakugan Battle Brawlers, Bakugan Battle Brawlers: New Vestroia,Bakugan: Gundalian Invaders
- Walter Shreeve/Shriek in Batman Beyond
- Mr. Thirsty in Best Ed
- Optimus Prime in Transformers: Animated, Transformers: Prime
- Bald and Tim Marcoh in Fullmetal Alchemist
- Tim Marcoh and Isaac McDougall (Episode 1) in Fullmetal Alchemist: Brotherhood
- Regeena Peterson in Atomic Betty
- King Randor in He-Man and the Masters of the Universe (2002)
- Luis Otero in Scooby-Doo! and the Monster of Mexico
- Dark Lord in Flint the Time Detective
- Gideon in Beyblade V-Force
- Coach Barthez in Beyblade G-Revolution
- The narrator in Keroro Gunso
- Cliff in CatDog
- Dr. Stankfoot in Zevo-3
- Banutu Steven Jibolba in Tak and the Power of Juju
- Kyle in Pokémon Ranger and the Temple of the Sea
- Arceus in Pokémon: Arceus and the Jewel of Life
- Ultralord, Professor Crankk, and Corky Shimatzu in The Adventures of Jimmy Neutron: Boy Genius
- Prince Phobos in W.I.T.C.H.
- Buros/Bross in Nurse Angel Ririka SOS
- Tip Top in Roary the Racing Car
- Gravekeeper's Chief and The D in Yu-Gi-Oh! GX
- Rex Goodwin in Yu-Gi-Oh! 5D's
- Dr. Faker and Kazuma Tsukumo in Yu-Gi-Oh! Zexal
- Gasparde in One Piece The Movie: Dead End no Bōken
- Papa in Baron Omatsuri and the Secret Island
- Shadow in Spider Riders
- Takuma Zaizen in Witch Hunter Robin
- Asurada in Future GPX Cyber Formula
- Slaynn in Record of Lodoss War, Record of Lodoss War: Chronicles of the Heroic Knight
- Katsunoshin Asaka in Fancy Lala
- Teddington Twingersnap in Viva Piñata
- Shū in Legend of Raoh: Chapter of Death in Love
- William Walter Wordsworth in Trinity Blood
- J.B. Morrison in Devil May Cry: The Animated Series
- Mufu in Ninja Scroll: The Series
- A. J. Sebastian in Appleseed (OVA)
- Nina's Grandfather in Ultra Maniac
- Shu, Ginew and Ill in Dragon Ball Super
- Porter in The Adventures of Chuck and Friends
- Mordecai in Regular Show
- Dio Brando in JoJo's Bizarre Adventure (OVA)

=== Live action shows and movies ===
- Farkus "Bulk" Bulkmeier in Mighty Morphin Power Rangers, Mighty Morphin Power Rangers: The Movie, Power Rangers Zeo, Power Rangers Turbo, Power Rangers in Space, Power Rangers Lost Galaxy
- Charles Atwood in Just for Kicks (TV series)
- Tyler Steele in VR Troopers
- Gene Taylor in Angela's Eyes
- Ross Morgan in My Babysitter's a Vampire, My Babysitter's a Vampire (TV series)
- Mr. Howard in iCarly
- The Masked Mutant in Goosebumps (Episode: Attack of the Mutant Parts I and II)

=== Video games ===
- Arcturus Mengsk, Zeratul, and other characters in StarCraft
- Bruce Wayne/Batman in Batman: Arkham Asylum, Batman: Arkham City, Batman: Arkham Origins, Bruce Wayne/Batman and Thomas Elliot/Hush in Batman: Arkham Knight, Injustice 2, Bruce Wayne/Batman and Darkseid in Mortal Kombat vs. DC Universe, Bruce Wayne/Batman, Andrew Carter and Matches Malone in Batman: Arkham Shadow
- Cyril, Flash and Kane in The Legend of Spyro: A New Beginning, Cyril and Gaul in The Legend of Spyro: The Eternal Night, Cyril and Chief Prowlus in The Legend of Spyro: Dawn of the Dragon
- Mark Hammond in The Getaway
- Dimitri Allen in Professor Layton and the Unwound Future
- Clark Triton in Professor Layton and the Last Specter
- Eddie O' Connor in The Getaway: Black Monday
- Optimus Prime in Transformers: War for Cybertron
- Deputy Chief Jim Bravura in Max Payne
- Sergeant James Byrd and Elder Tomas in Spyro: A Hero's Tail
- Sergeant Cross in Need for Speed: Most Wanted
- Lando Calrissian in Star Wars Battlefront, Star Wars Battlefront 2
- Kaim Argonar in Lost Odyssey
- Sandman in Spider-Man 3
- Francois Candide in Vanquish
- Prophet in Crysis 2
- Harry and Mickey Desmond in Mafia II
- Florian Greenheart in Overlord II
- Tom Sheldon and Salvador Mendoza in Just Cause
- Suzaku and Matsunoshin Gohda in Tenchu 2: Birth of the Stealth Assassins
