= Cocco Bill (TV series) =

Animated television series

- Genre: Western
- Created by: Benito Jacovitti
- Based on: Cocco Bill by Benito Jacovitti
- Starring: Enrico Maggi; Raffaele Fallica; Silvana Fantini; Guido Ruberto; Claudio Moneta; Antonio Paiola; Gianni Quillico; Mario Scarabelli; Marco Balzarotti; Luca Bottale
- Composer: Bruno Marro
- Country of origin: Italy; Germany (season 1); Hong Kong (season 2)
- Original language: Italian
- No. of seasons: 2
- No. of episodes: 104

Production
- Executive producers: Pietro Campedelli; Max Gusberti; Sylvia Rothblum (season 1); Steven Ching (season 2)
- Producer: Thomas Haffa
- Running time: 13 min.
- Production companies: Rai Fiction; De Mas & Partners; EM.TV & Merchandising AG (season 1); Agogo Media (season 2)

Original release
- Network: Rai 2; Rai 1; RaiSat Ragazzi; RaiSat Smash Girls; Rai Gulp; Sat.1
- Release: 10 December 2000 – 2004

Cocco Bill is an animated television series that aired from 2000 to 2004. It is produced by De Mas & Partners, Rai Fiction, EM.TV & Merchandising AG for the first season, and Agogo Media for the second season. It was inspired by the Coco Bill comic book character created by Benito Jacovitti. Two series were produced for a total of 104 episodes, each lasting for 13 minutes.

== Italian voices actors ==
- Enrico Maggi as Cocco Bill
- Raffaele Fallica as Trottalemme
- Silvana Fantini as Osusanna Iloveyou
- Guido Ruberto as Bunz Barabunz
- Claudio Moneta as the Clown, Every Mad and various voices
- Antonio Paiola as Mr. Godkiller
- Gianni Quillico as Bob La Mossa
- Mario Scarabelli as Doctor and various voices
- Marco Balzarotti as Biss Kroma and various voices
- Luca Bottale as Various voices

=== English voice actors ===
- Gregory Snegoff as Cocco Bill and Trottalemme
- Susan Spafford as Osusanna Iloveyou
- Ted Rusoff as Bunz Barabunz

== Episodes ==
=== Season 1 (2000–2001) ===
No. overall	No. in season	Title	Original release date
1	1	"Cocco Augh!"	10 December 2000
2	2	"Cocco Gets It Right"	17 December 2000
3	3	"One Cocco, Two Pistols, and a Crib"	24 December 2000
4	4	"Cocco and the Guardian Angel"	31 December 2000
5	5	"Cocco Cocco Cocco Bill"	7 January 2001
6	6	"Cocco Bill on Track"	14 January 2001
7	7	"Cocco Lucks It Out"	21 January 2001
8	8	"Cocco Bill Against All"	28 January 2001
9	9	"Coccobilliput"	4 February 2001
10	10	"Cocco Bill Pirate"	11 February 2001
11	11	"Coccobusy"	18 February 2001
12	12	"Coccobillchamill"	25 February 2001
13	13	"Cocco Bill Deceives Them All"	4 March 2001
14	14	"Cocco Nice, Bad, Ugly"	11 March 2001
15	15	"Cocco Seven"	18 March 2001
16	16	"Double Cocco"	25 March 2001
17	17	"Cocco Bill and the Ghosts"	1 April 2001
18	18	"Cocco Bill and the Shrink"	8 April 2001
19	19	"Cocco Bill Loses His Shadow"	15 April 2001
20	20	"Coccochristmas"	22 April 2001
21	21	"Cocco Bill Queen Puma"	29 April 2001
22	22	"Cocco Bill Catastrophe"	6 May 2001
23	23	"Cocco Bill Treasure"	13 May 2001
24	24	"Coccocrazy"	20 May 2001
25	25	"Sheriff Cocco Bill"	27 May 2001
26	26	"Cocco Bill in Babylon City"	3 June 2001
27	27	"Viva Cocco Bill"	10 June 2001
28	28	"Cocco Bill and Daddy's Pet"	17 June 2001
29	29	"Cocco Bill Crossing"	24 June 2001
30	30	"Cocco UFO"	1 July 2001
31	31	"Cocco Bill Returns to the Future"	8 July 2001
32	32	"Cocco Bill and the Laughing Dead"	15 July 2001
33	33	"Cocco Bill in the Mines"	22 July 2001
34	34	"Cocco Bill and the Vanishing Wagons"	29 July 2001
35	35	"Cocco Bill and the Ace Up His Sleeve"	5 August 2001
36	36	"Cocco Bill Jurassic"	12 August 2001
37	37	"Cocco Bill and the Son of Moby Dick"	19 August 2001
38	38	"Cocco Boom!"	26 August 2001
39	39	"Cocco Bill and Frankenstein's Brother"	2 September 2001
40	40	"Cocco Bill and His Soul Mate"	9 September 2001
41	41	"Cocco Bill and the Chamonesia"	16 September 2001
42	42	"Cocco Bill and the Lake Monster"	23 September 2001
43	43	"Cocco Bill and the Rigged Rewards"	30 September 2001
44	44	"Cocco Thriller: The Defense's Turn"	7 October 2001
45	45	"Cocco Bill and the Great Race"	14 October 2001
46	46	"Cocco Bill Dances with Bears"	21 October 2001
47	47	"Cocco Bill at Fort Apache"	28 October 2001
48	48	"Cocco Bill and the Vampire"	4 November 2001
49	49	"Cocco Bill and the Clown"	11 November 2001
50	50	"This Crazy, Crazy, Crazy Cocco"	18 November 2001
51	51	"Cocco Bill and the Big Bad Wolf"	25 November 2001
52	52	"Cocco Bill and the Haunted Castle"	2 December 2001

=== Season 2 (2004) ===
No. overall	No. in season	Title	Original release date
53	1	"Cocco and the Little Menace"	2004
54	2	"Cocco Cookies"	2004
55	3	"Cocco Hood"	2004
56	4	"Cocco Spot"	2004
57	5	"Camp Cocco"	2004
58	6	"Cocco and the Phantom of the Opera"	2004
59	7	"Cocco and the Lovable Old Lady"	2004
60	8	"Cocco Fast Hands"	2004
61	9	"Cocco Spy"	2004
62	10	"Phewy Cocco Bill"	2004
63	11	"Cocco and the Invisible Bunz"	2004
64	12	"Cocco Lilliput"	2004
65	13	"Cocco Bill Versus Cocco Bill"	2004
66	14	"Cocco Bill Says Yo"	2004
67	15	"Cocco and the Little Wizard"	2004
68	16	"Cocco Zelig"	2004
69	17	"Cocco Takes on El Ratto"	2004
70	18	"Sizzlin' Sixguns Cocco Bill"	2004
71	19	"Croco Cocco"	2004
72	20	"Cocco Bill and Lady Bunz"	2004
73	21	"Cocco and the Window on the West"	2004
74	22	"Cocco Bill and the Diamond Chicks"	2004
75	23	"Cocco Bill and the Fugitive"	2004
76	24	"Rocky Cocco"	2004
77	25	"Cocco at the Centre of the Earth"	2004
78	26	"Tomorrow's Another Cocco Day"	2004
79	27	"Cocco Bill and the Indian Mask"	2004
80	28	"Cocco Crusoe"	2004
81	29	"Slowtrot Superstar"	2004
82	30	"Supercocco and Terminator"	2004
83	31	"Cocco, the Sword and the Weasel"	2004
84	32	"Cocco Sting"	2004
85	33	"An Ass Named Cocco"	2004
86	34	"Cocco Bill and the Doubloons"	2004
87	35	"Cocco Bill Takes on the Trio"	2004
88	36	"Cocco Bill Chases Shadow"	2004
89	37	"Cocco Bill and the Sheik"	2004
90	38	"Cocco and the Mummy"	2004
91	39	"Dumb Cocco"	2004
92	40	"Cocco Bill and the Counterfeiter"	2004
93	41	"Cocco and the Rebel Genius"	2004
94	42	"Cocco Bill No Good"	2004
95	43	"Cocco and the Hoax Dinner"	2004
96	44	"Cocco and the Preacher"	2004
97	45	"Cocco and the Sleeping Bunzy"	2004
98	46	"Cocco and the Works"	2004
99	47	"Cocco Against Mandrike"	2004
100	48	"Cocco Bill and Mathusalem"	2004
101	49	"Cocco Bill Witness Protection"	2004
102	50	"Cocco Duel"	2004
103	51	"Cocco and the Turkey of the Baskervilles"	2004
104	52	"Cocco Bill's Cruise"	2004

== See also ==
- List of Italian television series
