= Vendetta (1995 film) =

1995 Swedish action thriller film

- Directed by: Mikael Håfström
- Written by: Thomas Borgström; Lars Bill Lundholm
- Based on: Vendetta by Jan Guillou
- Produced by: Ingemar Leijonborg; Hans Lönnerheden
- Starring: Stefan Sauk
- Cinematography: Erling Thurmann-Andersen
- Edited by: Sofia Lindgren
- Music by: Francis Shaw
- Distributed by: SF International Sales
- Release date: February 10, 1995 (Sweden)
- Running time: 135 minutes
- Country: Sweden
- Language: English

Vendetta is a 1995 Swedish film directed by Mikael Håfström and starring Stefan Sauk as the Swedish intelligence officer Carl Hamilton and as his adversary Don Tommaso, Ennio Fantastichini. It was released to cinemas in Sweden on 10 February 1995. A television miniseries was filmed at the same time. It aired as six episodes of 50–60 minutes each.

== Plot ==
Carl Hamilton is assigned to go to Sicily to free two Swedish businessmen who are held captive by a local villain named Don Tommaso. The Don wants a Swedish naval robot system in exchange for his hostages. In the beginning Hamilton acts merely as a negotiator, but when he cannot accept the demands of his counterpart, the situation escalates.

Hamilton stands up against Don Tommaso, while abduction and murder becomes the language of negotiation. A classical vendetta is initiated, as narcotics from Colombia and the Italian intelligence community become involved.

== Cast ==
- Stefan Sauk as commander Carl Hamilton, naval officer and intelligence operative
- Ennio Fantastichini as Don Tommaso
- Luigi Di Fiori as Giulio, Don Tommaso's brother
- Erland Josephson as the grey eminence of Swedish intelligence, "DG"
- Roland Hedlund as Samuel Ulfsson, Naval Commodore, and Chief of the Military Intelligence Service's operative department OP5
- Mats Långbacka as captain Åke Stålhandske, Swedish marine officer and intelligence operative
- Per Graffman as captain Joar Lundwall, Swedish marine officer and intelligence operative
- Antonio Di Ponziano as lieutenant Luigi Bertoni-Svensson, Swedish marine officer and intelligence operative
- Orso Maria Guerrini as lieutenant general Giuseppe Cortini
- Oliver Tobias as colonel Gustavo Da Piemonte
- Marika Lagercrantz as Eva-Britt Hamilton, Carl's wife
- Malin Lagerhem as Johanna-Louise Hamilton, Carl's daughter
- Paolo Maria Scalondro as Nitto Stradella, don Tommaso's bodyguard
- Stig Engström as Johan Carlemar, Technical Manager, Swedish Armament
- Claes Ljungmark as Gustav Hansson, Sales Manager, Swedish Armament
- Pasquale Anselmo as Enrico
- Leonardo De Carmine as Roberto
- Ralf Wolter and Carlo Barsotti (the voice) as Don Giovanni
- Marcello Tusco as Don Salvatore
- Renato Carpentieri as Aldo Sabatini
