= Batman: Arkham Knight =

2015 video game

- Developer: Rocksteady Studios (Note: WB Games Montréal did additional work and development support for the base game and developed the Harley Quinn, Red Hood, Batgirl: A Matter of Family, and Scarecrow Nightmare DLC content; all other DLC was developed by Rocksteady. Ported to Nintendo Switch by Turn Me Up Games.)
- Publisher: Warner Bros. Interactive Entertainment
- Director: Sefton Hill
- Producers: Daniel Bailie; Nathan Burlow
- Designer: Ian Ball
- Programmer: Ben Wyatt
- Artist: David Hego
- Writers: Martin Lancaster; Sefton Hill; Ian Ball
- Composers: Nick Arundel; David Buckley
- Series: Batman: Arkham
- Engine: Unreal Engine 3
- Platforms: PlayStation 4; Windows; Xbox One; Nintendo Switch
- Release: PS4, Windows, Xbox One; June 23, 2015; Nintendo Switch; December 1, 2023
- Genre: Action-adventure
- Mode: Single-player

Batman: Arkham Knight is a 2015 action-adventure game developed by Rocksteady Studios and published by Warner Bros. Interactive Entertainment. Based on the DC Comics superhero Batman, it is the successor to the 2013 video game Batman: Arkham Origins, a direct sequel to Batman: Arkham City (2011) and the fourth main installment in the Batman: Arkham series. Written by Sefton Hill, Ian Ball, and Martin Lancaster, Arkham Knight is inspired by the long-running comic book mythos. Set nine months after the events of Arkham City, the game's main storyline follows Batman as he confronts Scarecrow, who has launched an attack on Gotham City and caused a citywide evacuation. Scarecrow, with the help of the mysterious Arkham Knight, plots to unite all of Gotham's criminals in an attempt to finally destroy Batman.

The game is presented from a third-person perspective, with a primary focus on Batman's melee combat, stealth abilities, detective skills, and gadgets. Batman can freely move around the open world of Gotham City, interacting with characters and undertaking missions, and unlocking new areas by progressing through the main story or obtaining new equipment. The player is able to complete side missions away from the main story to unlock additional content and collectible items. Combat focuses on chaining attacks together against numerous foes while avoiding damage, while stealth allows Batman to conceal himself around an area, using gadgets and the environment to silently eliminate enemies. Arkham Knight introduces the Batmobile as a playable vehicle, which is used for transportation, puzzle solving and combat.

Development on Arkham Knight began in 2011 after completion of Arkham City and took place over four years. Rocksteady opted to use its own writers for the main story with collaboration by comic book writer Geoff Johns, choosing to replace Paul Dini who had worked on Arkham Asylum and Arkham City. The introduction of the Batmobile required a change in the team's design methodology, as the previous games' city designs were too narrow and confined to allow smooth travel for the vehicle.

Arkham Knight was released worldwide on June 23, 2015, for PlayStation 4, Windows, and Xbox One. A Nintendo Switch version was released in December 2023. The PlayStation and Xbox console versions of the game received generally favorable reviews, and was considered to be a satisfying conclusion to the franchise, although there was criticism for the Batmobile's combat mechanics and the requirement for 100% completion for the ending. The Windows and Nintendo Switch versions were subject to criticism for technical and performance issues that rendered it unplayable for some users, with Warner Bros. temporarily withdrawing the Windows version from sale to fix issues. At release, the game was the fastest-selling game of 2015, and the fastest-selling game in the Arkham series, reaching over 5 million units sold globally by October 2015. It was also the 6th best-selling game of 2015 in the UK.

The game also received several accolades, including Best British Game, Best Game, and Best Action-Adventure Game. It was also featured in many lists of the best video games of 2015 and of the 2010s. A variety of post-release content was released for the game, including story-based missions, challenge maps, and skins for Batman and his allies, different historical Batmobile designs, and racetracks. A continuation of the series, Suicide Squad: Kill the Justice League, was released on February 2, 2024.

== Gameplay ==
Batman: Arkham Knight is an action-adventure game set within an open world Gotham City, which can be explored freely by the player from the beginning of the game, allowing them to travel seamlessly anywhere within its boundaries. Many of the gadgets and the gameplay elements from the previous Arkham games return, including the grapnel gun, line launcher, batarangs, the countering system, Detective Vision, and the Remote Hacking Device. The Disruptor receives upgrades from previous games, becoming a rifle that can be used to disable or detonate enemy weapons and drone turrets, boobytrap weapon crates to shock enemies who attempt to arm themselves, and tag vehicles for Batman to track. The remote controlled batarang is upgraded as well to include a scanner that can be thrown out to gain additional information on the surrounding area. New gadgets include the Voice Synthesizer, which can be used to imitate other characters' voices such as Harley Quinn and the Arkham Knight to manipulate thugs into traps.

The player can fly Batman throughout the city using his cape, with gliding now allowing for faster, longer sustained flights, steeper dives, and higher climbs. Batman can use some gadgets while gliding, such as batarangs or the line-launcher. The grapnel gun can now be used to instantly switch directions during a glide, as well as being fired twice while in the air to chain grappling moves together.

Batman: Arkham Knight lets the player glide Batman all throughout the city using his cape.

The game's "Freeflow" combat system allows for basic attacks, including strikes, counters, and dodging, which can be combined to keep Batman attacking while moving between enemies, and avoiding being attacked himself. Basic enemies include enemies armed with shields and shock batons, while others are armed with guns, which significantly damage Batman. These enemies can perform a charge and tackle attack only used by larger enemies in previous games; precision-timed dodging, and a batarang can instantly defeat some charging enemies. The system adds the ability to combine attacks on prone enemies without interrupting a combo streak. Batman can counter enemy attacks, and throw them into other enemies for increased damage. Batman is also capable of disarming enemies wielding items like baseball bats, and using the acquired weapon on several foes before it breaks. Arkham Knight introduces "Dual Play," in which players can seamlessly switch control of Batman to one of his allies during certain events of the game: Robin, Nightwing, or Catwoman while in Freeflow combat, which the player enters when they have accumulated an uninterrupted combat-streak. Each successful, uninterrupted attack adds to the player's combat score, which carries over between each controlled character, and unlocks double-team takedowns on opponents at higher scores.

Arkham Knight introduces enemy medics who can shield enemies in electrified fields and revive unconscious ones, sword-wielding enemies, and brutes who are resistant to damage and must be stunned before they can be attacked; brutes wielding Gatling guns, tasers, and blades require additional steps to defeat. Enemies are capable of employing tactics to counter Batman's various skills, including deploying landmines, controlling hovering drones, disabling vents if Batman is found using them, and detecting his location if Batman uses Detective Vision for too long.

Throughout the city, Batman encounters enemy watchtowers, guard posts, aerial drones, and explosive mines embedded in the city streets. Some drones can be hacked and turned against their allies by using the Remote Hacking Device. Arkham Knight introduces the "Fear Takedown," where Batman can subdue up to five enemies simultaneously as long as he remains undetected; time is slowed after each takedown, allowing the player to target the next enemy. Hazardous items such as power generators can be used in combat for environmental attacks. Combat is rewarded with experience points (dubbed "WayneTech points" in game), which are used to unlock gadget abilities, combat moves, and health upgrades. Batman can now access grates from afar, allowing him to roll forward and immediately get under the grate if in range, instead of having to be right on top of them, while also initiating multiple takedowns from within them. Some enemies carry devices capable of blocking Batman's Detective Vision.

Arkham Knight features side missions, known as "Most Wanted" missions, which can be attempted at any time and feature prominent characters from the Batman universe. One such character, the Riddler, provides 243 optional "Riddler challenges" to solve. These challenges consist of collecting trophies hidden throughout the city, through the use of gadgets or Batman's car, the Batmobile, to disable traps and barriers, and completing timed races. The player can mark Riddler trophies on the in-game map once found if they do not initially have the necessary equipment to complete the puzzle, and learn of additional locations for collectables by interrogating the Riddler's henchmen.

Batman can investigate crimes such as murders, using his Detective Vision to reconstruct the crimes to locate clues and identify the perpetrators, or use his Tissue Scanner to investigate a victim's skin, muscle, and bones for clues. Completing the story mode unlocks a New Game Plus mode, enabling the player to replay the game with all of the gadgets, experience, abilities, and Riddler collectibles that they have obtained. The completion of some tasks is reflected in the Gotham City Police Department, with thugs and supervillains becoming incarcerated, and criminal memorabilia from missions and previous games being collected in the evidence room.

=== Batmobile ===
The game introduces the Batmobile as a drivable vehicle. The bulletproof Batmobile can be summoned to the player's location while on foot or, if the player is airborne, summoned to meet Batman as he lands. The vehicle features the ability to perform jumps, speed boosts, rotate on the spot, smash through objects like barricades and trees, and fire missiles that can immobilize enemy vehicles. Batman can eject from the Batmobile and immediately begin gliding around Gotham City.

Most enemies will flee at the sight of the vehicle, eliminating the need for Batman to fight them, and enemies attacking the car can be subdued by its automated taser defenses. Like Batman, the Batmobile can be upgraded with new abilities. Riddler challenges also feature objectives requiring the Batmobile, such as timed races in tunnels beneath Gotham City, where the environmental obstacles change during each lap, and invisible question marks that must be revealed using the Batmobile's scanner.

The Batmobile has two modes, which can be switched at any time: Pursuit and Battle. Pursuit is for moving from area to area and completing specific driving challenges. In Battle mode, the Batmobile transforms into a tank, allowing a full 360-degree range of movement, including strafing in any direction, while revealing the multiple weapon systems on board, including a Vulcan rotary cannon for quick damage, a 60mm hypervelocity cannon for fire support, anti-tank guided missiles for wide-ranging damage against multiple targets, and a non-lethal riot suppressor.

Additional upgrades to the vehicle include increasing the number of anti-tank missiles up to 10, an EMP device, which releases an electric pulse used to temporarily stun enemy drones; and the "drone virus," which allows the player to override the weapon systems of enemy vehicles and cause them to attack each other. The Batmobile can also be controlled remotely, driven within indoor locations, and used in solving the game's puzzles, such as lowering an inaccessible elevator with its attached winch or obtaining a Riddler trophy. The Batwing is used in conjunction with the Batmobile to deliver upgrades.

== Synopsis ==
=== Characters ===
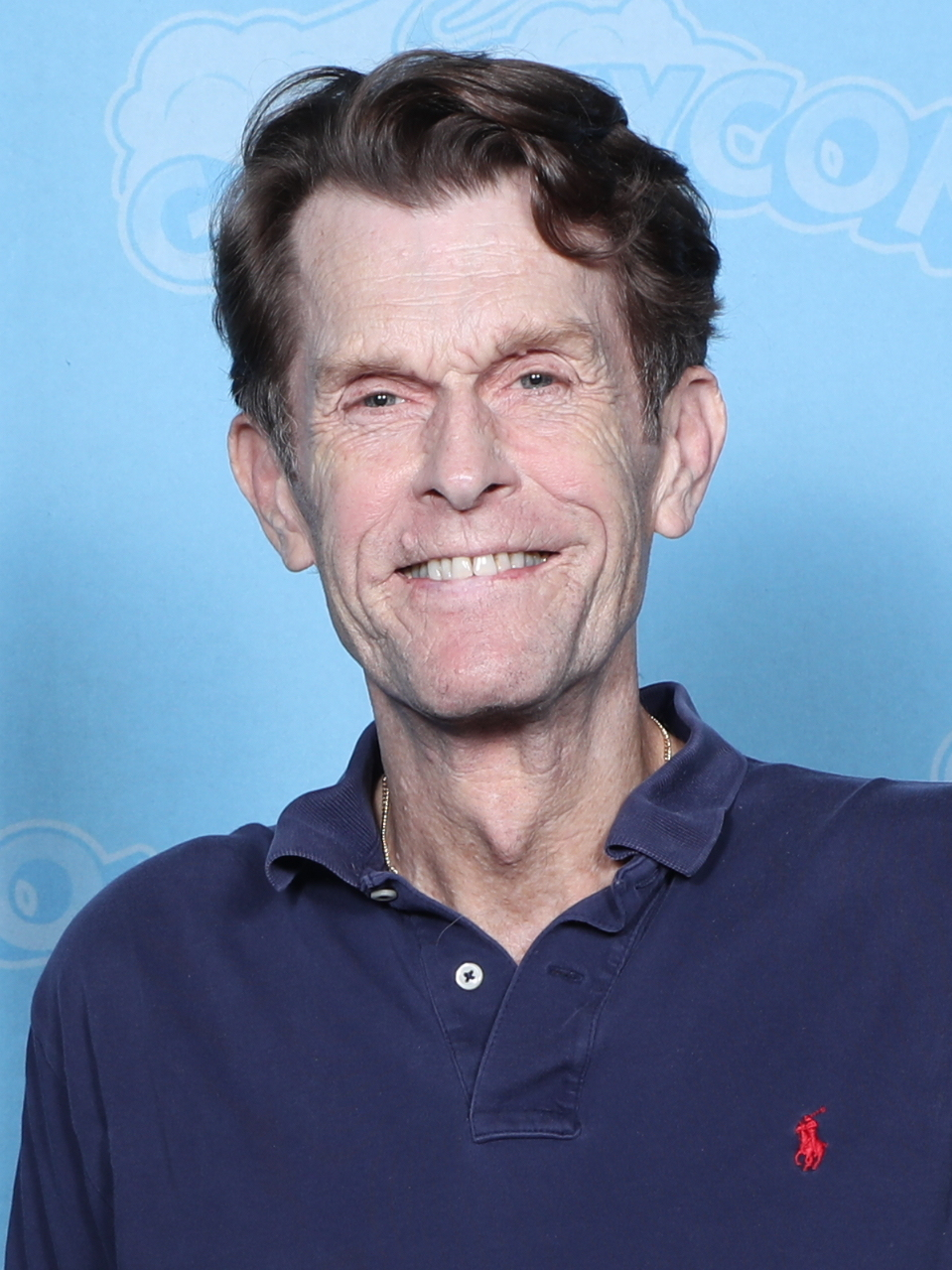
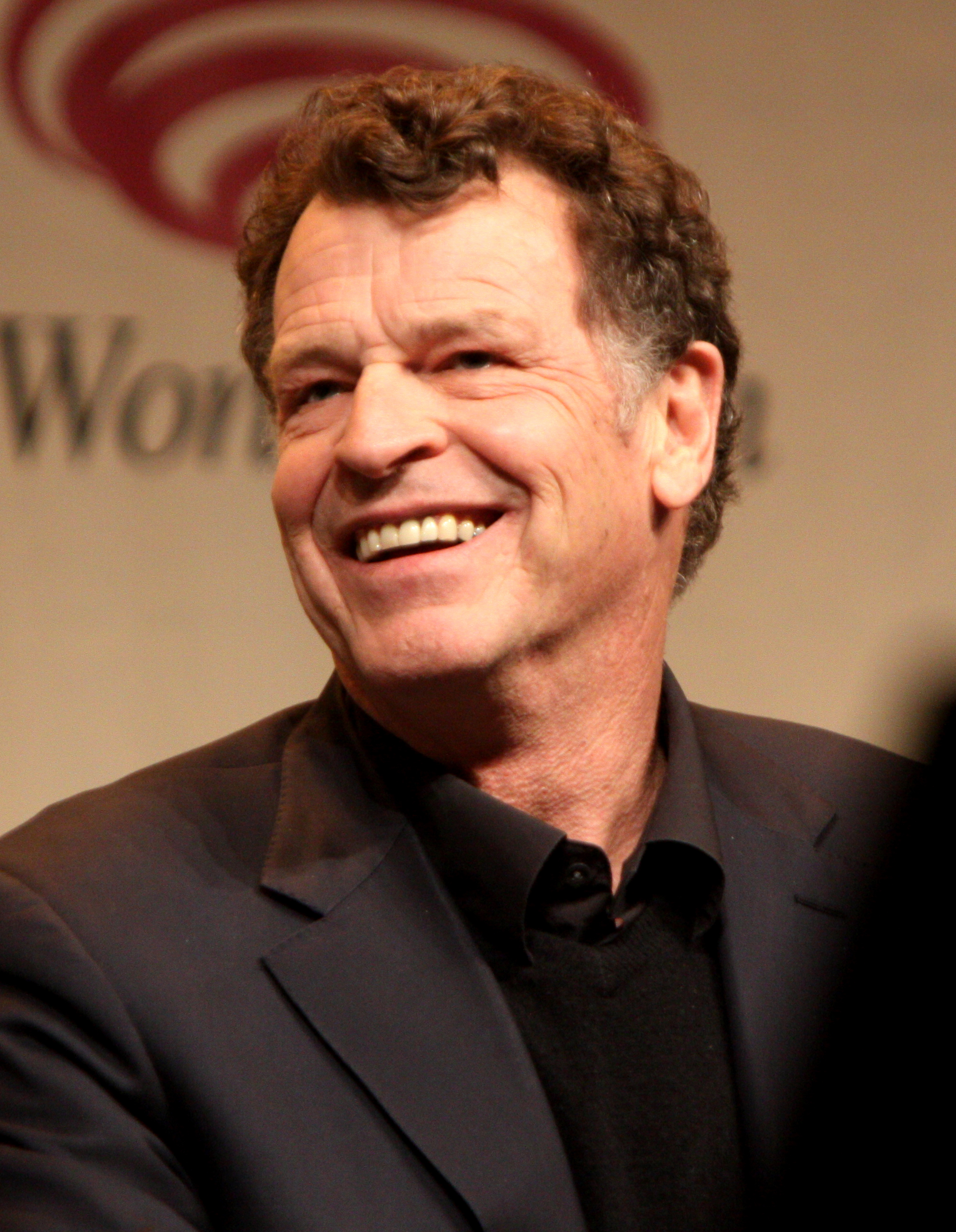
Kevin Conroy (left) voiced Batman in all of Rocksteady's Arkham games. John Noble voiced Scarecrow, the primary antagonist of the game.

Arkham Knight features a large ensemble cast of characters from the history of Batman comics. The main character is Batman (Kevin Conroy)—a superhero trained to the peak of human physical and mental perfection and an expert in martial arts. He is supported by his allies, Robin (Matthew Mercer), Nightwing (Scott Porter), Catwoman (Grey DeLisle), Barbara Gordon (Ashley Greene)—who assists Batman covertly as the hacker Oracle—and her father, police commissioner James Gordon (Jonathan Banks). Batman's loyal butler Alfred Pennyworth (Martin Jarvis) and Wayne Enterprises colleague Lucius Fox (Dave Fennoy) provide Batman with tactical support, and the holy warrior Azrael (Khary Payton) aims to replace Batman as Gotham City's protector.

Throughout the city, Batman is faced with several supervillains: he must overcome Scarecrow's (John Noble) plot to threaten Gotham, dismantle the Penguin's (Nolan North) weapon dealing operation, put an end to Two-Face's (Troy Baker) bank heists, conquer the Riddler's (Wally Wingert) challenges, capture the plant-controlling Poison Ivy (Tasia Valenza), and subdue Harley Quinn (Tara Strong), who wants revenge against Batman for the death of the Joker (Mark Hamill), Batman's psychopathic nemesis who appears in the game as a hallucination.

The game introduces the Arkham Knight (also voiced by Baker), a new villain created by Rocksteady, DC Comics CCO and comic-book writer Geoff Johns, and DC co-publisher and comic artist Jim Lee. The Arkham Knight is a militarized version of Batman, with the "A" logo of the Arkham Asylum facility worn as an emblem on his chest. Other villains include the pyromaniac Firefly (Crispin Freeman), the beastly Man-Bat (Loren Lester), the veteran assassin Deathstroke (Mark Rolston), the serial killer Professor Pyg (Dwight Schultz), the religious fanatic Deacon Blackfire (Marc Worden), and Hush (also voiced by Conroy), who is impersonating Batman's alter ego as Bruce Wayne.

Arkham Knight also features appearances and voice cameos by various characters drawn from the history of Batman comics and the previous Arkham games, including pharmaceutical businessman Simon Stagg (Philip Proctor), reporters Vicki Vale (also voiced by DeLisle) and Jack Ryder (James Horan), police officer Aaron Cash (Duane Shepard), corporate businessman Lex Luthor (Keith Silverstein), crimefighter Kate Kane, serial killer Calendar Man, and mutated gangster Killer Croc (Steve Blum), while the game's downloadable content features appearances by Mad Hatter (Peter MacNicol), Black Mask (Brian Bloom), Mr. Freeze (Maurice LaMarche), Ra's al Ghul (Dee Bradley Baker), Nyssa Raatko (Jennifer Hale), and Nora Fries (Cissy Jones). The game also makes references to many characters from the history of Batman and DC Comics.

=== Setting ===
Nine months after the death of the Joker during the events of Arkham City, Batman is struggling to cope with the absence of his archenemy and the uncomfortable feeling that the pair shared a bond deeper than either could admit. Without the Joker's presence, Gotham's citizens have never felt safer, and crime in the city has declined significantly. However, this gives Batman's enemies, including Penguin, Riddler, Two-Face, and Harley Quinn, a chance to unite with the singular goal of defeating Batman. Having anticipated a new threat, Batman has continued to develop crime-fighting technology and maintain a vigil over the city.

On Halloween night, Scarecrow, who Batman had defeated in Arkham Asylum, threatens the city with his newly created strain of fear toxin and bombs planted throughout Gotham, forcing the evacuation of the city's six million civilians. Only criminals remain in the city, leaving Commissioner Gordon and the Gotham City Police Department (GCPD) outnumbered.

Arkham Knight's Gotham City is approximately five times the scale of the open-air Arkham City prison in Arkham City. The game takes place in the center of the city, which is split into three islands: Bleake, Founders, and Miagani, with various districts such as the neon-tinged Chinatown, and the industrial shipping yard. Bleake Island features shorter buildings, disheveled areas, and abandoned docks, while Founders Island is a modern development of skyscrapers built on the ruins of Gotham slums, and Miagani Island is an older metropolis with Wayne Tower at its center. Oracle has set up her communications headquarters in the Gotham clock tower, which also houses a makeshift Batcave.

=== Plot ===
On Halloween, Scarecrow forces an evacuation of Gotham City after threatening to unleash his new fear toxin. Batman tracks Scarecrow to a hideout where he rescues the imprisoned Poison Ivy, who had refused to join Batman's other rogues in Scarecrow's plot. Oracle identifies Ace Chemicals as the source of Scarecrow's toxin. Batman investigates the facility and discovers a large militia being dispatched to occupy Gotham, led by the mysterious Arkham Knight. Batman locates Scarecrow, who has transformed the building into a toxic bomb meant to engulf the entire Eastern Seaboard. Scarecrow reveals that he has kidnapped Oracle before escaping. Exposing himself to the toxin, Batman inhibits the bomb's blast radius before the Joker confronts him.

A flashback reveals that before the Joker's death, his infected blood was used in blood transfusions, infecting five people, including Batman. Concealing his infection, Batman imprisoned the four other patients, who were physically and mentally transforming into the Joker. Joker, existing as a mental projection produced by the infected blood and fear toxin, frequently appears to taunt Batman and twist his perception of reality. After Batman escapes Ace Chemicals, he alerts Gordon to his daughter's kidnapping, revealing that she aids his vigilantism. Gordon, feeling betrayed, abandons him and leaves to find Scarecrow on his own.

Batman learns that Scarecrow recruited business mogul Simon Stagg to build the Cloudburst, a mass dispersal device for the fear toxin. Aboard Stagg's airship, Batman finds Scarecrow, but a dose of his fear toxin allows the Joker's persona to temporarily assume control of Batman while the Arkham Knight extracts the Cloudburst. Recovering, Batman locates Oracle in Scarecrow's hideout, where he watches her shoot herself after being exposed to fear toxin. Harley Quinn seizes Batman's makeshift base inside the Panessa film studio to rescue the "Joker-ized" patients. Batman and Robin capture Harley and the infected, but one of the patients kills the others and himself, believing that Batman will become the perfect "Joker". Realizing that Batman is infected, Robin attempts to imprison him, but is instead locked in a cell by Batman for his own safety.

The Arkham Knight activates the Cloudburst, flooding the city with fear toxin. Batman destroys the tank carrying the Cloudburst and convinces Ivy to empower an ancient tree that can neutralize the toxin. She succeeds and saves Gotham, but dies from the exertion, while Batman's exposure to the toxin strengthens the Joker's control over him. Batman pursues the Arkham Knight to a construction site to rescue Gordon. The Knight reveals himself to be Jason Todd, the previous second Robin, who was tortured and seemingly murdered by Joker. Todd blames Batman for abandoning him and escapes after refusing Batman's offer to help him. Batman and Gordon confront Scarecrow, where Oracle is revealed to be alive, with her suicide having been a hallucination. Batman rescues Oracle and returns her to the Gotham City Police Department (GCPD), but Scarecrow escapes with Gordon as a hostage. Using the remaining militia, Scarecrow assaults the GCPD to eliminate Batman's allies. Batman and Oracle neutralize the militia, but Scarecrow uses the distraction to kidnap Robin.

To save Robin and Gordon, Batman surrenders to Scarecrow and is taken to the ruins of Arkham Asylum. Scarecrow unmasks Batman as Bruce Wayne to the world on television, before repeatedly injecting Batman with his fear toxin to break him before the public. Batman and Joker battle for control inside Batman's mind; Joker attempts to weaken Batman by showing the effects of succumbing to the infection, but Batman triumphs and locks the Joker away deep within his mind, forever to be forgotten—the Joker's only fear. Todd saves Batman, who subdues Scarecrow with his own fear toxin. After Batman ensures that Gotham is safe, Gordon dispatches the police to reclaim the streets, and Batman activates the Knightfall Protocol to protect his loved ones. Surrounded by reporters, Batman returns home to Wayne Manor, where Alfred greets him; as the pair enter the manor, it explodes.

Sometime later, Gordon, now the Mayor of Gotham, prepares to attend Oracle and Robin's wedding. Elsewhere, two muggers attack a family in an alley but are confronted by a nightmarish figure resembling Batman.

== Development ==
In August 2012, Paul Dini, writer of the first two games in the Arkham series, said he would not be involved in writing a sequel to Arkham City. He did not write that game's story-based Harley Quinn's Revenge downloadable content, and said that Warner Bros. and Rocksteady suggested he accept other work if offered. Rocksteady opted to use its own team of writers, headed by game director Sefton Hill and designer Ian Ball, with script elements by Martin Lancaster; Geoff Johns served as a consultant on the plot.

Development of Arkham Knight began in 2011 after completion of work on Arkham City, and took four years to finish. It was publicly revealed in March 2014, following leaked marketing material at the end of February, with series creators Rocksteady Studios returning to develop the game, following the development of 2013's Batman: Arkham Origins by WB Games Montréal. Arkham Knight is described as the concluding chapter of the Arkham series from Rocksteady; they had a finale for the series in mind since the development of Arkham City. Kevin Conroy returns as the voice of Batman, having done so in Arkham Asylum and Arkham City, after stating at the 2013 Dallas Comic Con that he had been working on "the next Arkham". This statement led to speculation that he would reprise his role as Batman in Arkham Origins, the only Arkham game known to be in development at the time, which was not the case, as Batman would be voiced by Roger Craig Smith in that title.

Rocksteady decided early on in development to make Arkham Knight only for the then-upcoming next-generation of consoles, which was considered to allow them to focus on using the system resources to their fullest without reining in their ideas to accommodate the older generation systems. The game allows for up to five times the number of on-screen enemies as were possible in Arkham City, and riots can feature up to fifty on-screen enemies interacting with the environment to smash items, and spray graffiti. The technical changes also allowed for cutscenes to be rendered in real time in the game engine, where previous installments had used pre-rendered videos to compensate. Describing the scale of difference between Arkham Knight and earlier games, lead character artist Albert Feliu said that a single character model in Arkham Knight could contain the same amount of polygons used to render the entirety of Arkham Asylum's environment. Arkham Knight is the first in the series to use the Apex physics simulation engine to have items like cloth, such as Batman's cape, react realistically to movement or wind. Warner Bros. supported Rocksteady's concept for the game, but both parties felt that three years was too long to wait between games, so WB Games Montréal was tasked with creating the prequel, Arkham Origins, to fill the gap.

Unlike Arkham Origins, the game does not feature a multiplayer component. As Hill explained, the development team knew the single-player game would take the team's full effort, with their "focus on making the best single-player experience we can. We [did not] feel that it [needed] a multiplayer element. Warner Bros. backed that up right at the start."

=== Design ===
Batman's Batmobile was an aspect of the character that Rocksteady had wanted to include in its other Arkham games, but were limited by technical constraints. The designers, who worked in conjunction with DC, chose to look at their earlier design from Arkham Asylum, instead of models from the history of Batman comics and media, and evolve that to meet the necessary gameplay requirements. The vehicle was designed to integrate with Batman's on-foot traversal without being a burden; Hill stated, "We didn't want it to be like, 'Okay, the Batmobile is so good I'll just stay in that all the time.' or 'Batman is so powerful gliding around I won't be using the Batmobile.' There's a definite need to use both of those." The world's challenges were set out on the vertical and horizontal plane of the map to discourage players from using only one form of movement, with the Batmobile providing a faster method for moving large distances over gliding. Unlike Arkham Origins, Arkham Knight does not feature a fast travel system as the designers considered traversal to be part of the game, and allowing players to skip that would detract from the experience. Buildings hit by the vehicle suffer cosmetic damage without slowing the car, as it was considered that being impeded by a collision while turning a corner would diminish the fantasy of driving the Batmobile.

During early development, Rocksteady placed a prototype Batmobile in the existing Arkham City map, and learned that the claustrophobic city designed for Batman to glide and grapple did not work well for driving a vehicle. Gotham City was thus redesigned with wider streets to allow space for the Batmobile and other street traffic to drive without colliding into walls, and buildings were made taller to accommodate the vehicle's ejection ability. To redesign Gotham City, the designers attempted to build on the previous games' gothic architecture while making a more believable and dense city. Alongside minor elements like neon lights, billboard advertising, and American-style cars, the team developed ideas for shops that could be found in the city, while retaining a grimy, dystopian theme. Describing the design, Hego said: "every kind of element we've added in there ... makes the entire experience feel a little out of time. You couldn't pinpoint whether it's twenty years ago, now or in ten years time." The designers valued making an open world that was "rich, vibrant, dense...and full of interesting things to do" over it just being large.

In writing for Batman, Hill considered that a fundamental aspect of the character was how he interacts with his villains, allies, and the city around him. Hill said: "You know, what does it mean to be Batman? ...How does it affect Batman when things happen to him? What is his psychological make up? Those are the influences behind the game... you actually delve into the psyche of what makes him what he is, which is where I think so much of the interest in Batman is." Batman's armor was redesigned to match that of the Batmobile to make them appear visually similar—featuring the same shapes and material textures—and appear functionally compatible with the high-speed methods in which the character enters and exits the vehicle. The design also added armor over Batman's shoulders, covering the previously exposed cape, to make it appear more feasible that it could hold Batman's weight without failing during gliding. For other returning characters, art director David Hego said that the designs were conceived to keep them interesting after players had seen them several times before in previous games, while the game's autumnal setting also necessitated a change in character clothing over the winter setting of Arkham City. The Penguin lost his long coat, and was made to look dirtier, his clothing showing signs of sweat and food stains, and his head was shaved. For Two-Face, the designers felt the character did not require changing significantly, and instead emphasized existing character traits, particularly his disfigured flesh, using references of burnt flesh as inspiration. Similarly, they wanted to retain the typical Riddler characterizations like green shirts emblazoned with question marks, but instead had the character design evolve throughout the game, modifying his own costume in response to the events of the plot.

The game's titular villain is created specifically for the game, with input from comic-book writer Geoff Johns and comic artist Jim Lee. Hill noted that Rocksteady wanted to introduce an antagonist who could challenge Batman on equal terms. Feliu stated that the Arkham Knight's design reflects his role in the game as well as his knowledge of Batman's tactics and fighting style. The Arkham Knight wears a high-tech, militarized version of the Batsuit with short antennas that resemble bat ears to mock Batman. His angular chest plate acts as a means of deflecting the batclaw; his utility belt, in contrast to Batman's, is low-slung; and his gauntlets, boots and armor are influenced by the lightweight design of a fighter aircraft: "highly resistant, unreflective and totally intimidating". The Arkham Knight's holographic helmet conceals his identity with a robotic voice synthesizer, giving the impression of a ghostly figure, and his visor provides him with a heads-up display to monitor his militia forces. His suit has a distinct camouflage pattern of "dark greys interspersed with dashes of red [that] enable him to remain concealed between the gloomy shadows and garish neons of Gotham's alleyways and rooftops".

=== Music ===
Arkham Asylum and Arkham City composer Nick Arundel returned to score Arkham Knight, while his partner on those games, Ron Fish, was replaced by composer David Buckley. On his continued involvement in the series, Arundel said, "One of the good things about doing a sequel, is you get the opportunity to redo [things you wished you changed], to revisit things... We have a set of material that we want to keep consistent, like the Batman theme ... We wanted to keep [that] theme and tailor it more to the story for this game. How can we get the Scarecrow element out of that one theme." Arundel added that Buckley was willing to work within the music he had already created, as opposed to wanting to add his own personal touch to it. Buckley received Arundel's work from Arkham Asylum to help create new variations on the chords and melody from the original theme. Volume 1 of the official soundtrack was released from WaterTower Music alongside the game on June 23, 2015, and a limited edition vinyl record featuring fifteen songs from the soundtrack chosen by Arundel. The game features the song "I've Got You Under My Skin" by Frank Sinatra. "Mercy" by Muse, and "The Wretched" by Nine Inch Nails were used in trailers, with Nine Inch Nails vocalist Trent Reznor serving as a music consultant on the "Be the Batman" trailer.

== Marketing ==
The game was originally scheduled to be released during Batman's 75th Anniversary celebration in 2014, and as a result, DC presented the "Cape/Cowl/Create" art exhibit in London in June 2014, and at San Diego Comic-Con in July 2014. The exhibit featured contemporary artists painting on a cape and cowl designed by Asher Levine and based on the batsuit from the game. In May 2015, a life-size replica of the Batmobile from the game, designed by West Coast Customs, was on display at MCM London Comic Con. Starting on May 8, 2015, until the release of the game, Rocksteady released weekly behind-the-scenes videos called "Arkham Insider", featuring Rocksteady staff describing various aspects of Arkham Knight's gameplay as well as answering fan questions. "Arkham Insider" returned in August 2015 to highlight the monthly DLC releases, with the series running until December 2015 over a total of 11 episodes. Various products were developed based on the game including clothing, hats, calendars, posters, and headphones.

When asked if the Arkham Knight was an entirely new character or simply new to the Batman: Arkham series, marketing producer Dax Ginn claimed that he is "completely original" in terms of his design and role, and a character whom Batman has not encountered before. Ginn described the opportunity to create an original character in the Batman universe as "terrifying", but noted that the developers at Rocksteady relished the chance to make a mark on the Batman property that would last beyond the games themselves.

== Release ==
Batman: Arkham Knight was released on PlayStation 4, Windows, and Xbox One on June 23, 2015. The game was originally scheduled to be released on October 14, 2014. It was delayed to June 2, 2015, and then delayed again to June 23, 2015. On the first delay, Rocksteady marketing game manager Guy Perkins stated, "If we didn't give the team more time to do it, then we would be releasing something that we weren't happy with. We want to make sure we're absolutely nailing it 100%." A quality assurance tester for the game added, "Getting [the game] to work on consoles was impossible for months. That's part of why the game got delayed so many times, [Rocksteady was] totally unprepared for how hard it was on next-gen consoles." In the UK, the Windows version is only available as a digital release. Additionally, a Linux and OS X version of the game developed by Feral Interactive was scheduled for release in early 2016 after originally being scheduled to release in late 2015; it was canceled in February 2016. Feral stated the original delay was to "ensure good performance and wide-ranging support" for the two platforms.

In February 2015, it was revealed that Arkham Knight had received a "Mature" rating from the ESRB, rather than the "Teen" ratings previous installments in the franchise held. Sefton Hill and the Rocksteady team were caught off guard by the rating; Hill explained that they did not create the game with a specific rating in mind, but that "It's unavoidable that some bad stuff is going to happen. But that doesn't mean we changed our approach. We're not including gratuitous blood or swearing. We want to deliver a true end with no compromises, and it takes us to some dark places." Although he did not elaborate which content in particular triggered the "M" rating, Hill did note that a "ratings analysis" by Warner Bros. indicated that the content of certain "key" scenes in the game could affect its rating. After careful deliberation, the team ultimately decided to maintain the offending content, so that it would not "jeopardize" their vision for the game and its thematics. In an in-depth explanation of the game's content, the ESRB revealed the existence of scenes where players can "shoot unarmed characters and a hostage", and torture scenes taking place on a "bloody operating table" as well as using a vehicle's wheel.

Free updates to the game were released to provide fixes and updates to the game, some based on community feedback. These included a Big Head mode, which makes all characters in the game have disproportionate heads; a photo mode, which allows players to edit photos taken during gameplay; the ability to use the original voice cast, with localized subtitles; and updates to the game's AR challenges. These included the ability to select all playable characters from the game and its downloadable content (DLC) to be used in all combat and predator challenge maps. Previously, each map had predefined character selection; the addition of a harder difficulty setting on combat challenges; more round-based challenges as well as interior map locations; and the removal of the blue wall around the challenges, which players found distracting.

=== Retail editions ===
A "Limited Edition" was released, containing the game in a Steelbook case, an 80-page concept art book, an Arkham Knight issue #0 comic book, alternate costumes for Batman, Robin and Nightwing based on DC Comics' The New 52, and a statue of Batman. The "Batmobile Edition" contains the "Limited Edition" items, but replaces the Batman statue with a transformable Batmobile statue. However, on June 17, consumers who purchased the "Batmobile Edition" were notified that the edition had been canceled due to a quality issue with the Batmobile statue from designer Project Triforce. Consumers were able to receive a refund or have their purchase transferred to another edition. Two days later, it was revealed that the "Limited Edition" was delayed for release in Europe until mid-July 2015 due to a packaging quality issue.

"The Serious Edition" was released exclusively on Amazon.com. This edition featured the game, the "First Appearance" skin (based on Batman's first appearance in Detective Comics #27), and a limited 25th anniversary edition of Arkham Asylum: A Serious House on Serious Earth, the graphic novel on which the Batman: Arkham series is loosely based.

A "Premium Edition" was made available containing both the game and the season pass. A limited edition PlayStation 4 was also released, featuring a "Steel Gray" console and controller with a custom Batman faceplate. In 2016, it was released a "Game of the Year Edition" of the game for PlayStation 4 and Xbox One, featuring all the downloadable content from the season pass.

== Downloadable content ==
=== Official expansions ===
Harley Quinn is a playable character via downloadable content (DLC) in a story-driven mission, that follows the character as she infiltrates the city of Blüdhaven to assault the police station and rescue her partner-in-crime Poison Ivy. Jason Todd as Red Hood is also a playable character via DLC in a story-driven mission, in which Red Hood goes up against Black Mask. The WayneTech Booster Pack provides the player with four upgrades for Batman and the Batmobile on the onset, as opposed to earning them by progressing through the game. The Scarecrow Nightmare DLC, exclusive to the PlayStation 4, depicts a Gotham City that has succumbed to the Scarecrow's fear gas transforming it into a twisted nightmare image of itself, overseen by a towering Scarecrow and his undead army.

Additional content was made available via the game's season pass, which includes story-driven missions; Challenge Maps for Batman and his allies; new Batmobiles from Batman's history and custom racetracks for them; skins for Batman and his allies; and all pre-order retailer content once their timed exclusivity expired in August and September 2015. The story-driven missions include "The Season of Infamy", new "Most Wanted" missions played through the main game, where the player as Batman goes up against "legendary super-villains invading Gotham City, with new story arcs, missions and gameplay features", and "Arkham Episodes", where players control Batman's allies in short story missions that take place before and after the events of Arkham Knight to further expand their narratives.

Batgirl: A Matter of Family, which was developed by WB Games Montréal, is an "Arkham Episode" featuring Barbara Gordon as Batgirl set before the events of Arkham Asylum. Set in the Seagate Amusement Park, a nautical theme park built atop an oil rig, Batgirl and Robin team up to save her father, Commissioner Gordon, from the Joker and Harley. The content carries over the Dual Play function and hacking ability, which allows Batgirl to take down enemies, control objects, and solve puzzles. Design producer Justin Vazquez said, "Hacking is really what separates her from the other characters... Our intention was that Batgirl should be less powerful than Batman, but that Batgirl plus hacking could give her opportunities to do things that not even Batman can pull off." The content was released on July 14, 2015, for PlayStation 4 and Xbox One, with the Windows release on October 28, 2015. Other "Arkham Episodes" include "GCPD Lockdown", set after the events of Arkham Knight, in which Nightwing must stop the Penguin from breaking out of the GCPD, which was released in September 2015; Catwoman's Revenge, set after the events of the main game, in which Catwoman gets her revenge on the Riddler which was released in November 2015; and A Flip of a Coin, set after the events of the main game, in which Robin hunts down Two-Face, which was released in November 2015. The Harley Quinn and Red Hood story packs which were pre-order bonuses were also considered "Arkham Episodes".

December 2015 saw the release of four "Season of Infamy" missions, which see the Mad Hatter playing sinister mind-games with Batman, with members of the GCPD caught in the middle; Killer Croc escaping from his maximum security cell and wreaking havoc on a crashed airship; the League of Assassins returning to Gotham City in order to restore Ra's al Ghul's health; and Mister Freeze returning to Gotham City, where the Arkham Knight's militia kidnaps Freeze's wife Nora in exchange for his help capturing Batman. The "Season of Infamy" missions add new areas to the main game, including a new wing at the GCPD and the interior of Elliot General Hospital, new enemies such as assassins from the League of Assassins, and new gameplay mechanics.

=== Other content ===
Additional content released in August 2015 included the 1989 Movie Batmobile pack, which includes a skin based on the suit worn by Michael Keaton from Batman, the Batmobile from the film, and two racetracks based on the film and its sequel, Batman Returns; the Bat-family Skins pack, which includes six character skins based on alternate timelines; and content previously released as pre-order bonuses. For September 2015, Rocksteady released two Crime Fighter Challenge Packs, featuring 11 AR combat and predator challenges for all playable characters and one for the Batmobile; the 2008 Tumbler Batmobile pack, which included the Tumbler Batmobile and two racetracks based on The Dark Knight; and the Arkham Asylum skin for Batman.

For October 2015, the additional content included a third Crime Fighter Challenge Pack, featuring 6 AR combat and predator challenges for all playable characters and the Batmobile; the "Batman Classic TV Series Batmobile" pack, which includes the 1960s TV series Batmobile, skins for Catwoman and Robin based on the series, and two racetracks inspired by the series; and a 1970s Batman-themed Batmobile skin. For November 2015, Rocksteady released the 2016 Batman v Superman Batmobile pack, which included a skin based on the suit worn by Ben Affleck in Batman v Superman: Dawn of Justice and the Batmobile from the film; and the Wayne Tech pack, with two Batmobile racetracks. The pack also included two challenge maps; challenge maps for "GCPD Lockdown"; the original Tim Drake skin for Robin, and a Robin-themed and Riddler-themed Batmobile skins; and a fourth Crime Fighter Challenge Pack, featuring 6 AR combat and predator challenges for all playable characters.

The final month of additional content release, December 2015, saw the release of the Christian Bale Batsuit from The Dark Knight, due to a multitude of fan requests since it was not featured in the Tumbler pack in September 2015; the original Arkham Asylum Batmobile; a fifth Crime Fighter Challenge Pack, featuring 6 AR combat and predator challenges for all playable characters; a skin for Harley Quinn based on her classic look and the Arkham Knight skin for Red Hood; a Rocksteady-themed Batmobile skin; and a Batman: Noël skin.

In January 2016, Rocksteady released a sixth Crime Fighter Challenge Pack, originally named the Community Challenge Pack in response to players' help in providing feedback to get the Windows version fixed and for submitting requests for the challenge maps in the pack. Included in the pack were five challenge maps from previous Arkham games, a combat map for "Crime Alley" from Arkham Knight and an "endless wave" predator map, "Endless Knight". The returning predator maps include "Wayne Manor Main Hall" and "Batcave" from Arkham City and "Sanatorium, Medical Facility" from Arkham Asylum, while the combat maps include "Iceberg Lounge" and "Monarch Theatre" from Arkham City. The pack was released on Windows a week before coming to consoles. A skin based on Batman Incorporated was also released in the month.

A number of alternate appearances were made available for various playable characters. Batman's skins include designs worn in the 1960s TV series; Justice League 3000; Batman Beyond; The Dark Knight Returns; the "First Appearance" design; The New 52; Flashpoint; Batman: Gotham Knight (Anime Batman); Earth 2; Arkham Origins; "Iconic Grey and Black"; 1970s Batman; the 1989 film; Zur-En-Arrh; Arkham Asylum; The Dark Knight film; Batman v Superman: Dawn of Justice; Batman: Noël; and Batman Incorporated. Robin's skins include designs based on The New 52; "One Year Later"; the 1960s TV series; and the original Tim Drake design. Nightwing's skins include designs based on The New 52; and Arkham City. Catwoman's skins include designs based on the 1990s Catwoman, and the 1960s TV series. Harley and Red Hood have skins based on her classic look and the Arkham Knight uniform, respectively.

Alternate designs for the standard Batmobile include ones based on the 1960s TV series; a prototype version; 1970s Batman-themed; Robin-themed; Riddler-themed; and Rocksteady-themed. All-new, drivable Batmobiles include the 1989 film, Tumbler, 1960s TV series, Batman v Superman: Dawn of Justice, and the original Arkham Asylum Batmobiles. These Batmobiles do not feature a tank mode and can only be used in the main game after all tanks have been eliminated or on specific Batmobile challenge maps. In terms of design, the 1989 film and 1960 TV series ones are longer and narrower with better handling than the standard Arkham Knight Batmobile. Racetracks for the Batmobile include two based on Batman and Batman Returns; two based on The Dark Knight; two based on the 1960s TV series; and two WayneTech tracks.

In October 2023, the Epic Games Store release of the game was updated to include the Batsuit worn by Robert Pattinson from The Batman, but was since removed shortly after. It was exclusively released on the Nintendo Switch on 1 December, with release on other platforms coming on 15 December.

== Related media ==
=== Comics ===
Textless cover of Batman: Arkham Knight – Genesis, featuring the Arkham Knight's in-game character model

In December 2014, a prequel digital-first comic was announced, written by Peter Tomasi, with art by Viktor Bogdanovic and Art Thibert, and covers by Dan Panosian. The comic picks up after the events of Arkham City and was released digitally in February 2015, with the first print release featuring a collection of the digital issues in March 2015. Tomasi said the comic has "contained arcs, but there's an over-arcing story that [goes] right to the launch of the game and beyond." In April 2015, a second comic, Batman: Arkham Knight – Genesis, was announced centered around the origin of the Arkham Knight. The six-issue monthly miniseries, written once again by Tomasi with art by Alisson Borges, was released starting in August 2015.

=== Novels ===
A novelization of the game, written by comic book writer Marv Wolfman, was released alongside the game. A 320-page prequel novel written by Alex Irvine, titled Batman: Arkham Knight – The Riddler's Gambit, was released shortly after, focusing on Batman's conflict with the Riddler as he attempts to take control of Gotham City's criminal underworld in the aftermath of the Joker's demise.

== Reception ==
=== Critical reception ===
Reception

Aggregate scores
Aggregator	Score
Metacritic	87/100 (PS4); 85/100 (XONE); 70/100 (PC)
OpenCritic	82%

Review scores
Publication	Score
Destructoid	7/10
Edge	8/10
Game Informer	9.5/10
GameSpot	7/10
GamesRadar+	4/5
GamesTM	9/10
IGN	9.2/10
Polygon	10/10
VideoGamer.com	10/10
The Guardian	5/5
USGamer	4/5

Batman: Arkham Knight received "generally favorable" reviews from critics for the PlayStation 4 and Xbox One versions of the game, while the PC version received "mixed or average" reviews, according to review aggregator platform Metacritic. It has been cited as one of the greatest games of the 2010s and of all time.

Dan Stapleton of IGN rated the game a score of 9.2 out of 10, praising the graphics, gameplay variety, detail of the open world, the voice acting performances (particularly of Kevin Conroy as Batman, John Noble as Scarecrow, and Mark Hamill as Joker) and the overall improvement in the combat and predator systems. He criticized the Batmobile's Battle Mode as "weird" and "about as un-Batman an activity as [he could] imagine," as well as the difficulty of managing the vehicle's default controls, though praised the tank battles as "good fun". Polygon's Justin McElroy, giving the game a 10 out of 10, stated that the game "ticks all the boxes for the fourth entry in a AAA franchise." He lauded the ingenuity of the game's puzzles, noting how they make the players think on a significantly higher level than past entries in the series, calling the game "nothing short of revolutionary" and "the best game of this console generation." Steve Tilley of the Toronto Sun deemed the game "fantastic, if a little formulaic". He felt it a satisfying and appropriately large-scale conclusion to Rocksteady's Arkham games, praising the surprises in the plot, as well as the graphics, combat, and the Batmobile's range of abilities.

Andrew Reiner of Game Informer awarded Arkham Knight a 9.5 out of 10, calling it a "narrative juggernaut" with "the mother of all plot twists." He described the game's Gotham City as "a beautifully realized playground for Batman", highlighting the distinctive boroughs and added that the Batmobile "packs a satisfying punch" with its cannon, with additional praise to the Riddler racetracks and game variety. He felt though, that the combat was somewhat easier than previous games. Simon Miller, writing for VideoGamer.com, gave the game a 10 out 10 score and called it "the best Batman game ever made and a classic in its own right;" a "masterpiece". Despite the perfect score, Miller did name the Batmobile as one of the game's faults, though lauded the "rush of adrenaline" invoked while driving the car through the streets of the city.

Eurogamer's Dan Whitehead recommended the game, giving high praise to the detail of the open world and the characterization of Batman, but again criticizing the Batmobile's Battle Mode feature as one of the weaker aspects of the game. GamesTM gave Arkham Knight a 9 out of 10, praising the game for functioning without the presence of the Joker, and praising the story for its intimacy and inviting, epic-scale nature. The Batmobile gameplay was described as "thrilling", though the "least immersive" part of the game. The "Dual Play" elements were also hailed as the best aspect of the game in addition to their involvement with the Riddler challenges. Chris Carter of Destructoid, conversely was heavily critical of the Riddler challenges and their requirement for the game's full ending, finding many to be "tedious" while others lacked any resemblance of actual riddles, such as the breakable objects. He felt that the puzzles driven by intuition were the better elements of the mission.

Kevin VanOrd, writing for GameSpot, awarded the game a 7 out of 10, praising the game's "terrific" amount of variety, its improvement of past games' elements, the cleverness of the game's puzzles, and the "Dual Play" mechanics. VanOrd reacted positively to the segments involving the Batmobile's Battle Mode, calling it a "delight", and called the vehicle's driving "slick and satisfying". However, VanOrd found fault with some of the game's logic, particularly the clash between Batman's no-kill rule and the Batmobile's significant propensity for destruction. He also noted how the story's thematic elements and repeated metaphors became exhaustingly redundant, mentioning its "ham-fisted storytelling" and describing the game overall as "only as good as the world allows it to be." Sam Roberts from GamesRadar noted the game's satisfying cinematic value, particularly moments in which it felt like Batman: The Animated Series. However, Roberts did reserve some criticisms, calling some of the Batmobile's additions a "misfire" and deemed it a "mixed affair"; the campaign was described as full of "generally wonky storytelling, sometimes hammy dialogue and unconvincing duo of primary villains." Roberts praised the "gorgeous" open world and its side missions as "almost universally fantastic", finding fault with the Firefly missions among others. The Riddler's Batmobile racetracks were considered "beyond silly," though he still commended the character for his increased involvement in the story.

The reveal of the Arkham Knight's identity in Batman: Arkham Knight was met with a mixed reception from critics. Stapleton and Sam Roberts from GamesRadar both took issue with Rocksteady's marketing of the Arkham Knight as an original character, as the character behind the moniker is not. Stapleton felt the problem was that the marketing for the character indicated it was a "big mystery" to his identity, but any "moderately knowledgeable Batman fan could reasonably" deduce the identity: "We all already knew who the Arkham Knight was; we were just hoping it wasn't true because we wanted the original story we'd been promised." GamesRadar noted that the torture flashback scenes and the Red Hood DLC made the twist very predictable. Other outlets, including Andrew Reiner Game Informer and Sam Miller from Videogamer.com, found the mystery surrounding the character and the eventual revelation of his identity as Todd to be satisfactory.

=== DLC reception ===
Carter was critical of the Harley Quinn and Red Hood story packs, both originally pre-order bonuses before being released as purchasable DLC. Carter called both "painfully" and "disgustingly" short, respectively, with the Harley pack lasting around 30 minutes, and the Red Hood around 10 minutes. He added that he expected more from the downloadable content, hoping additional "Arkham Stories" would feature more content.

For the Batgirl: A Matter of Family story pack, Stapleton offered a mixed reaction, giving the DLC a 6.3 out of 10, praising the unique design and atmosphere of the theme park setting, and also commenting positively on the story, the variation in combat, Batgirl's character design, and Mark Hamill's performance as the Joker. A prominent concern, however, was the short length of the campaign and lack of replay value aside from the rather simple collectables found around the map. He added, "worse, there's no new AR challenge map where you can play as Batgirl, which means her great-looking character model is trapped in this single piece of story content. Considering Arkham Knight is fairly stingy in the challenge map department, that's another big missed opportunity." Reiner felt the pack would only be of value to players who enjoy the Arkham story, stating, "Developer WB Montreal can be commended for creating a wonderfully realized version of Batgirl, who is resourceful and capable of striking fear into Joker's henchmen, but the mission she embarks on lacks creativity and ranks among the Arkham series' worst." He did, however, praise the side story involving Edward Burke, the person who built the amusement park where the story takes place, calling it "twisted and dark" and shedding "new light on one of the series' mainstays."

Aoife Wilson of Eurogamer was critical of Batgirl's characterization, calling it a "bland, no-frills reading of the character, to be frank, which focuses on her familial connections rather than her youthful exuberance." Wilson also lamented that the emphasis on Batgirl's hacking abilities proved to be no more than a simple extension of Arkham Knight's remote hacking environmental puzzles. She offered words similar to Stapleton's on how the lack of additional challenge maps confines the Batgirl character model to only the DLC. Wilson was skeptical as to whether the future season pass DLC would be worth purchasing unless there was an increase in production value and a real introduction to new gadgets and gameplay variety. Carter gave the DLC a 6.5 out of 10, reacting positively to the confinement to the "good bits" of Arkham Knight, more specifically the lack of the Batmobile and an emphasis on puzzle-solving – he also compared it favorably to the Harley Quinn and Red Hood story packs towards which he previously gave negative reviews. In contrast to Stapleton, Carter felt that not many of the environments were particularly memorable, and also felt the length was sufficient compared to the game's previous story packs. Carter pointed out that a benefit to the game would be a free-roaming option involving the downloadable characters. Meanwhile, Erik Kain of Forbes felt that the DLC should have been provided free of charge, remarking on the campaign's shortness and calling it "straightforward" and "lackluster". He also criticized Warner Bros. for their marketing campaign with Arkham Knight and its DLC, commenting on their sacrificing quality over quantity to continuously charge customers for rather mediocre content.

Carter awarded the "Season of Infamy" content a 7.5 out of 10. He felt that the Mad Hatter mission was "the weakest link in the chain," calling it "a neat concept but it's so fleeting that I barely had time to digest it." For Killer Croc's, Carter said the mission was "a predictable storyline" since Killer Croc is generally portrayed as a "one-dimensional" foe, though "[i]t works better than Mad Hatter's portion... because most of it isn't comprised of re-used environments, and there is a nice brief reunion with Nightwing." Speaking of the Mister Freeze mission, Carter called the exploration of Freeze's relationship with his wife Nora "compelling" and enjoyed the fact it was the only "Season of Infamy" mission to feature a predator challenge. Additionally, he added that the Batmobile sequence had "more of a reason to exist than most of the ones in the campaign." Finally, Carter called the Ra's al Ghul mission "the other highlight of the pack" and felt the choice the mission gave players at the end was "pretty interesting". He also added the setting of Elliot General Hospital was a good way to highlight Hush's family legacy since his "part in [the main game] was extremely disappointing".

=== Windows version issues ===
The Windows version of the game had a more mixed reception. Criticism was aimed mostly at the technical issues present at the time of the game's release, ultimately leading to sales being temporarily suspended.

On June 23, 2015, the launch day for Arkham Knight, thousands of users reported major technical flaws and performance problems with the Windows version of the game, with some saying it seemed like the optimization phase of the game's development was skipped. Steam users immediately wrote scathing reviews of the game's performance, including reports of frame rate being capped at 30 frames per second (which could be raised, though with potential side effects) and dropping as low as 10 frames per second while gliding or using the Batmobile.

Even high-end graphics cards at the time such as Nvidia's GeForce GTX 970 were unable to handle the game well, with users reporting frequent frame rate dips and stutters. Nvidia and AMD released new device drivers optimized for the game in an attempt to address the performance issues, with Steam "strongly recommending" their download. The developer, Rocksteady, issued a statement saying they were aware of the issues and were "working closely with [their] external PC development partner", Iron Galaxy Studios, to resolve them.

On June 24, 2015, Warner Bros. Interactive Entertainment announced that it would suspend sales of the Windows version of Arkham Knight to work on addressing the performance issues to satisfy the company's quality standards. They also offered refunds for anyone who already purchased the game. Three days later, a patch was released which fixed some crash-causing problems. Rocksteady noted that they were continuing to focus on the frame rate problem, the low-resolution textures, and overall performance problems, among other issues needing fixes. In early July 2015, Kotaku reported that Warner Bros. were aware of the issues on the Windows version, with their sources stating they chose to ship the game as it was, "not to maniacally screw over customers—but because they believed it was good enough." Kotaku Australia additionally reported that the issues would not be fixed until at least September 2015, and that all stock retail versions were being recalled. By the middle of July, Warner Bros. announced they were "targeting an interim patch update for existing players to be released in August."

On August 21, 2015, Warner Bros. revealed the first interim patch was being tested, with a hope "to issue the patch in the next few weeks." The patch addresses frame rate hitches, optimization for graphics cards, the ability to change the max frames per second to 30, 60, and 90, additional granular settings for motion blur, film grain, and chromatic aberration, more texture options, and other settings, and a problem with the game running on mechanical hard drives versus solid state. Lesser priorities intended to be covered include the photo mode and downloadable content. The patch was released on September 4, 2015. Rocksteady and Warner Bros. announced that the game would be available for sale again on October 28, 2015, along with a patch updating the game to include all previously released DLC and content updates, except console exclusives. After the game was made available again, it was still criticized for lingering technical issues, resulting in Warner Bros. offering full refunds for the game as well as the game's season pass until the end of 2015, regardless of how long the game was owned. Warner Bros. also stated they would continue to address issues with the Windows version for those who chose to keep the game. PC Gamer, while placing the PC launch among the most problematic ones in recent years, noticed that there was an improvement after the patches.

=== Nintendo Switch version issues ===
Likewise, the Nintendo Switch version of the game, ported by Turn Me Up Games, was criticized upon release for its downgraded visuals and poor technical performance. Among the issues reported, various gameplay glitches rendered the game impossible to complete and the frame-rate consistently fell below 30 frames per second. Severe, persistent stuttering occurred while Batman traversed the game world, most notable when driving the Batmobile at high speeds.

PJ O'Reilly of Nintendo Life gave the port a 3 out of 10, describing the port as "appalling" and "easily one of the worst we've yet encountered on the console". Oliver Mackenzie of Digital Foundry called the game "legitimately quite challenging to play" and "painful". When reviewing the conversion, he citied asset and game world streaming issues, describing Batman as appearing to "momentarily jerk back... every so often as the frame-rates drop", akin to a rubber-banding effect found in various older multiplayer titles.

Patches for the game have since been released to address performance issues and bugs that prevented game completion, as well as to make the game playable on the Switch 2 at a consistent 30 frames per second. Nevertheless, the experience on Switch 1 hardware remains plagued with stuttering and an inconsistent frame rate.

=== Sales ===
Batman: Arkham Knight was the highest-selling game for June 2015 and became the fastest-selling game of 2015, beating the record previously held by The Witcher 3: Wild Hunt. It also was the second-best-selling game of 2015 behind Mortal Kombat X and the fastest-selling game of the Arkham franchise. The PlayStation 4 sales were the highest for a single SKU across any Batman game since the NPD Group began tracking the industry. By October 2015, the game sold over 5 million units worldwide. It was the 6th best-selling game of 2015 in UK.

=== Awards ===
Batman: Arkham Knight received Game Informer's award for Best Action Game seen at E3 2014 in June 2014. It also received IGN's Best Xbox One Game for their E3 2014 awards, while becoming runner-up for Game of Show and Best PlayStation 4 Game. The 2014 Game Critics Awards awarded Arkham Knight as Best Action/Adventure Game, while nominating it for Best of Show and Best Console Game. At the 2014 Golden Joystick Awards, Arkham Knight was nominated for Most Wanted game. In December 2014, the UK publication MCV reported that Arkham Knight was the most anticipated title for the region's retailers, ahead of Halo 5: Guardians, Evolve, The Order: 1886, and Uncharted 4: A Thief's End. The game also won in the category Trailer of the Year ("Father to Son") at the Play Legit's Best of 2014 Awards. PlayStation LifeStyle, The Escapist and GameSpot labeled the game as Best of E3 winner. At the PlayStation.Blog 2014 Game of the Year Awards the game was picked as Most Anticipated 2015 by editors' choice. At the XBA's Game of the Show Awards the game won in the categories Best Looker of the Show and Best Action Title of the Show. PlayStation Universe awarded the game as Best Action Game and Best Game seen at E3. GameRant labeled the game as Most Exciting Game of Summer 2015.

The game appeared on several best video games of 2015 lists, including: TheXboxHub and VideoGamer (first); Entertainment Weekly (second); Slant Magazine (third); Empire and Mashable (fourth); Daily Mirror, CNET, and Gamereactor (sixth); GamesRadar+ and Screen Rant (eighth); and Eurogamer (ninth). Batman: Arkham Knight also appeared on unranked lists from Time, The Verge, Forbes, The Daily Telegraph, Game Informer, TechRadar and New York Daily News. IGN put the game among "The Best-Reviewed Games of 2015".

In 2015, the game received five nominations for Golden Joystick Awards, including Best Storytelling, Best Visual Design, Best Audio, Best Gaming Moment for the return of the Joker, and Game of the Year. Mark Hamill also received a nomination for Performance of the Year for voicing the Joker. The game also received two nominations for The Game Awards 2015, including Best Art Direction and Best Action/Adventure Game, while Hamill received a nomination for Best Performance for voicing the Joker. The BIU Sales Awards awarded the game with the Gold Award, for selling more than 100k copies on one platform (the PS4 version). Push Square, Everyeye.it and Areajugones labeled the game as Game of the Month of June 2015. The Daily Telegraph Game Awards 2015 made Mark Hamill's performance runner-up in the category Best Performance. CGMagazine's 2015 Game of the Year awards awarded the game as Action Game of the Year. GameSpot's 2015 Special Achievement Awards awarded the game as Best Multiplatform Game That's Actually Better on Consoles. At the Webby Awards the game was awarded in the category 2015 Honoree (General Website Games-Related). The game also gained four nominations (Game of the Year, Studio of the Year, Best Graphics, Best Action-Adventure Game) at the Cody Awards 2015. In the Digital Spy Reader Awards 2015 the game won in the category Greatest Hero (Batman) and it was nominated in the category Best Game. In the same year, the game won in the category Best Video Game Trailer ("Gotham is mine") at the Golden Trailer Awards 2015. At the fifth edition of the Fun & Serious Game Festival the game won in the category Best Performance in Spanish (Claudio Serrano as Batman/Bruce Wayne). At the 16th edition of the Italian voice actors' festival (Voci nell'Ombra) the game won in the category Best Videogame Voice (Marco Balzarotti as Batman/Bruce Wayne). At the VMAG awards 2015, the game won in the categories Best Performance (Mark Hamill as Joker) and Best Art Direction.

In 2016, the 12th British Academy Games Awards awarded Batman: Arkham Knight as Best British Game and it was also nominated in the categories Artistic Achievement, Audio Achievement, Music and Performer (Mark Hamill). IGN Middle East Editor's choice - Game of the Year Awards 2015 and IGN Middle East People's Choice - Game of the Year Awards 2015 both awarded the game as Best Action-Adventure. At the IGN's Best of 2015 Awards the game won as People's Choice Best Action-Adventure Game and it was nominated in the categories Xbox One Game of the Year, Technical Excellence and Best Performances. The game also became runner-up in the category Best Storytelling at the IGN AU Select Awards. At the Warped Zoned's 2015 Golden Pixel Awards the game won the Great Scott Award for Best Trilogy Ender.

The 21st Empire Award awarded Batman: Arkham Knight as Best Game. At the Official Xbox Magazine Game of the Year Awards 2015 the game won in the categories Best Art Design and Best Gaming Moment (the "Look Who's Laughing Now" song, performed by the Joker), while becoming runner-up in the category Best Sound Design. Game Informer's 2015 Action Game of the Year Awards awarded the game in the category Best Story. The 15th National Academy of Video Game Trade Reviewers nominated the game in nine categories, including Game of the Year, and awarded Mark Hamill's performance as the Joker in the category Performance in a Drama, Supporting. The Straits Times Digital Awards awarded the game in the category Action Adventure Game. The Play Legit Best of 2015 Awards awarded the game in the categories Best Action Adventure, Best Graphics and Best Actor (Kevin Conroy). The game also won in the category Excellence in Convergence at the 2016 SXSW Gaming Awards and in the category Audio Design at the TIGA Awards. At the Italian Video Game Awards the game was also awarded as Best Action-Adventure Game. At the 2016 Develop Awards Rocksteady Studios won in the category In-House Studio. Gaming Debugged's Game Awards labeled the game as Best Use of a Licence. XGN, Millenium, PressFire and IMGMR, on their gaming awards, also labeled the game as Best Action/Adventure Game. At the PlayStation Bit Awards 2015, the game won in the categories Best Gameplay and Best Supporting Character (Joker). At the PlayStation.Blog 2015 Game of the Year Awards the game was included among the honorable mentions in the category Best Story. At the Kidzworld's Best Video Games Of The Year the game won in the category Best Graphics of The Year. The game also gained three nominations (Adventure Game of the Year, Outstanding Achievement in Animation, and Outstanding Achievement in Original Music Composition) at the 19th Annual D.I.C.E. Awards. In the same year, the game won in the category Interactive Entertainment Sound Production at the 31st Annual NAMM TEC Awards and it was nominated as Favorite Video Game at the People's Choice Awards. At the Annual Game Music Awards 2015 the game became runner-up in the category Outstanding Achievement - Cinematic Music and it was nominated in the category Outstanding Achievement - Voice Dialogue.

Batman: Arkham Knight awards
Year	Award	Category	Recipient	Result	Ref.
2014	Game Critics Awards	Best of Show	Batman: Arkham Knight	Nominated	
2014	Game Critics Awards	Best Console Game	Batman: Arkham Knight	Nominated	
2014	Game Critics Awards	Best Action/Adventure Game	Batman: Arkham Knight	Won	
2014	Golden Joystick Awards 2014	Most Wanted Game	Batman: Arkham Knight	Nominated	
2014	The Game Awards 2014	Most Anticipated Game	Batman: Arkham Knight	Nominated	
2014	Play Legit's Best of 2014 Winners	Trailer of the Year (Father to Son)	Batman: Arkham Knight	Won	
2015	33rd Golden Joystick Awards	Best Storytelling	Batman: Arkham Knight	Nominated	
2015	33rd Golden Joystick Awards	Best Visual Design	Batman: Arkham Knight	Nominated	
2015	33rd Golden Joystick Awards	Best Audio	Batman: Arkham Knight	Nominated	
2015	33rd Golden Joystick Awards	Best Gaming Moment – The "return" of the Joker	Batman: Arkham Knight	Nominated	
2015	33rd Golden Joystick Awards	Game of the Year	Batman: Arkham Knight	Nominated	
2015	33rd Golden Joystick Awards	Performance of the Year	Mark Hamill as the Joker	Nominated	
2015	Webby Awards	2015 Honoree (General Website Games-Related)	Batman: Arkham Knight	Won	
2015	The Game Awards 2015	Best Art Direction	Batman: Arkham Knight	Nominated	
2015	The Game Awards 2015	Best Performance	Mark Hamill as the Joker	Nominated	
2015	The Game Awards 2015	Best Action/Adventure Game	Batman: Arkham Knight	Nominated	
2015	Festival del doppiaggio Voci nell'Ombra	Videogame Award – Best Voice (Italian)	Marco Balzarotti as Batman/Bruce Wayne	Won	
2015	Fun & Serious Game Festival	Best Voice Acting (Spanish)	Claudio Serrano as Batman/Bruce Wayne	Won	
2015	Golden Trailer Awards	Best Video Game Trailer (Gotham is mine)	Batman: Arkham Knight	Won	
2015	Canadian Videogame Awards 2015	Best International Game	Batman: Arkham Knight	Nominated	
2016	IGN Awards 2015	People's Choice Best Action-Adventure Game	Batman: Arkham Knight	Won	
2016	IGN Awards 2015	Xbox One Game of the Year	Batman: Arkham Knight	Nominated	
2016	IGN Awards 2015	Technical Excellence	Batman: Arkham Knight	Nominated	
2016	IGN Awards 2015	Best Performances	Batman: Arkham Knight	Nominated	
2016	19th Annual D.I.C.E. Awards	Adventure Game of the Year	Batman: Arkham Knight	Nominated	
2016	19th Annual D.I.C.E. Awards	Outstanding Achievement in Animation	Batman: Arkham Knight	Nominated	
2016	19th Annual D.I.C.E. Awards	Outstanding Achievement in Original Music Composition	Batman: Arkham Knight	Nominated	
2016	2016 SXSW Gaming Awards	Excellence in Animation	Batman: Arkham Knight	Nominated	
2016	2016 SXSW Gaming Awards	Excellence in Convergence	Batman: Arkham Knight	Won	
2016	Develop Awards 2016	In-House Studio	Rocksteady Studios	Won	
2016	Develop Awards 2016	Use of a Licence or IP	Batman: Arkham Knight	Nominated	
2016	15th National Academy of Video Game Trade Reviewers (NAVGTR) awards	Game of the Year	Batman: Arkham Knight	Nominated	
2016	15th National Academy of Video Game Trade Reviewers (NAVGTR) awards	Art Direction, Contemporary	Batman: Arkham Knight	Nominated	
2016	15th National Academy of Video Game Trade Reviewers (NAVGTR) awards	Camera Direction in a Game Engine	Batman: Arkham Knight	Nominated	
2016	15th National Academy of Video Game Trade Reviewers (NAVGTR) awards	Character Design	Batman: Arkham Knight	Nominated	
2016	15th National Academy of Video Game Trade Reviewers (NAVGTR) awards	Control Precision	Batman: Arkham Knight	Nominated	
2016	15th National Academy of Video Game Trade Reviewers (NAVGTR) awards	Lighting/Texturing	Batman: Arkham Knight	Nominated	
2016	15th National Academy of Video Game Trade Reviewers (NAVGTR) awards	Performance in a Drama, Supporting	John Noble as "Scarecrow"	Nominated	
2016	15th National Academy of Video Game Trade Reviewers (NAVGTR) awards	Performance in a Drama, Supporting	Mark Hamill as "Joker"	Won	
2016	15th National Academy of Video Game Trade Reviewers (NAVGTR) awards	Game, Franchise Action	Batman: Arkham Knight	Nominated	
2016	12th British Academy Games Awards	Artistic Achievement	Batman: Arkham Knight	Nominated	
2016	12th British Academy Games Awards	Audio Achievement	Batman: Arkham Knight	Nominated	
2016	12th British Academy Games Awards	British Game	Batman: Arkham Knight	Won	
2016	12th British Academy Games Awards	Music	Batman: Arkham Knight	Nominated	
2016	12th British Academy Games Awards	Performer	Mark Hamill as the Joker	Nominated	
2016	21st Empire Awards	Best Video Game	Batman: Arkham Knight	Won	
2016	Golden Reel Awards	Best Sound Editing: Computer Interactive Entertainment	Andrew Riley	Nominated	
2016	TIGA Awards	Action & Adventure Game	Batman: Arkham Knight	Nominated	
2016	TIGA Awards	Audio Design	Batman: Arkham Knight	Won	
2016	TIGA Awards	Visual Design	Batman: Arkham Knight	Nominated	
2016	31st Annual NAMM TEC Awards	Interactive Entertainment Sound Production	Batman: Arkham Knight	Won	
2016	Italian Video Game Awards (Drago d'Oro)	Best Action-Adventure Game	Batman: Arkham Knight	Won	
2016	Play Legit's Best of 2015 Winners	Best Action Adventure	Batman: Arkham Knight	Won	
2016	Play Legit's Best of 2015 Winners	Best Graphics	Batman: Arkham Knight	Won	
2016	Play Legit's Best of 2015 Winners	Best Actor	Kevin Conroy as Batman/Bruce Wayne	Won	
2016	Play Legit's Best of 2015 Winners	Best Actor	Mark Hamill as the Joker	Nominated	
2016	People's Choice Awards	Favorite Video Game	Batman: Arkham Knight	Nominated	

== Series continuation ==
In August 2020, Rocksteady Studios announced they were developing Suicide Squad: Kill the Justice League, which was published by Warner Bros. Interactive Entertainment for PlayStation 5, Windows, and Xbox Series X/S in 2024. The game is set 5 years after the events of Arkham Knight, and is the first in the series to not feature Batman as the title character, instead focusing on the titular antihero team as they battle Brainiac and mind-controlled members of the Justice League (including Batman) in Metropolis.

When asked on Twitter by a fan, co-head of DC Studios James Gunn responded that Kill the Justice League was not planned to be the last entry in the series. His reply has since been deleted.
