= Pasquale Anselmo =

Italian actor (born 1958)

- Born: 14 April 1958 (age 68); Cosenza, Italy
- Occupations: Actor; voice actor
- Years active: 1980–present

Pasquale Anselmo (born 14 April 1958) is an Italian actor and voice actor.

== Biography ==
Born in Cosenza, Anselmo attended the Silvio D'Amico National Academy of Dramatic Arts and acted on stage, film and television. In 1995, he had a role in Mikael Håfström's film Vendetta, from Jan Guillou's novel of the same name and the following year, he started dubbing Nicolas Cage, which would later make him well known to the Italian public as Cage's primary Italian voice. Other actors dubbed by Anselmo include John Turturro, David Koechner, Philip Seymour Hoffman, John Ortiz, Woody Harrelson, Clark Gregg and more.

Some of Anselmo's popular dubbing roles include Phil Coulson (portrayed by Clark Gregg) in the Marvel Cinematic Universe, Jimmy McGill (portrayed by Bob Odenkirk) in Better Call Saul and Vic Mackey (portrayed by Michael Chiklis) in The Shield. In his animated roles, he voiced Lilliss in the Winx Club films and dubbed Vinny Santorini in the Italian and Spanish editions of Atlantis: The Lost Empire, Rico in the Madagascar franchise, and Pepé the King Prawn in The Muppets since 2005. Since the death of Vittorio Amandola in 2010, Anselmo took over as the Italian voice of Waylon Smithers in The Simpsons.

== Filmography ==
=== Cinema ===
- Il turista - short film (1985)
- Exit - short film (1985)
- Down There in the Jungle (1988)
- Condominio (1991)
- Crack (1991)
- Another Life (1992)
- No Skin (1994)
- Vendetta (1995)
- Palermo - Milan One Way (1995)
- Facciamo fiesta (1997)
- Le giraffe (2000)
- The Comeback (2001)
- Caterina in the Big City (2003)
- 18 Years Later (2010)
- A.N.I.M.A. (2019)

=== Television ===
- L’uomo che parlava ai cavalli - TV series (1984)
- Uomo contro uomo (1989)
- Aquile - TV series (1990)
- La piovra - TV series, season 5 (1990)
- Un bambino in fuga - Tre anni dopo - TV miniseries (1991)
- Addio e ritorno - TV film (1996)
- Pazza famiglia - TV series, episode 2.2 (1996)
- Linda e il brigadiere - TV series, episode 2.2 (1998)
- Squadra mobile scomparsi - TV series, episode 1.5 (1999)
- Father Matthew – TV series, episode 1x03 (2000)
- L'attentatuni - Il grande attentato - TV miniseries (2001)
- Sarò il tuo giudice - TV film (2001)
- La stagione dei delitti - TV series, first season (2004)
- Una cosa in mente - San Giuseppe Benedetto Cottolengo - TV film (2004)
- La buona battaglia – Don Pietro Pappagallo - TV miniseries (2006)
- The Teacher - TV series, episode 2.5 (2007)
- Liberi di giocare - TV film (2007)
- Era mio fratello - TV miniseries (2008)

== Voice work ==
=== Animation ===
- Lilliss in Winx Club: The Secret of the Lost Kingdom, Winx Club 3D: Magical Adventure
- Radius in Winx Club (season 5 and on)
- The Judge in Pinocchio (2012 film)
- Orso in Adrian
- Jet in Trash - La leggenda della piramide magica

=== Live action ===
- documentary voice in Il grande salto

=== Dubbing ===
==== Animation ====
- Vinny Santorini in Atlantis: The Lost Empire, Atlantis: Milo's Return (Italian and Latin Spanish dubs)
- Rico in Madagascar, Madagascar: Escape 2 Africa, Madagascar 3: Europe's Most Wanted, The Penguins of Madagascar
- Pepé the King Prawn in The Muppets' Wizard of Oz, The Muppets, Muppets Most Wanted
- The Joker in Justice League Action, Scooby-Doo and Guess Who?
- Timothy Lovejoy (season 5–6) and Waylon Smithers (season 21+) in The Simpsons
- Cad Bane and Hondo Ohnaka in Star Wars: The Clone Wars; Cad Bane in Star Wars: The Bad Batch; Hondo Ohnaka in Star Wars Rebels
- Bobby Goodfeather in Animaniacs
- Dr. Tenma in Astro Boy
- Peter Parker / Spider-Man Noir in Spider-Man: Into the Spider-Verse
- Clark Kent / Superman in Teen Titans Go! To the Movies
- Rumpelstiltskin in Happily N'Ever After
- Bernie Kropp in The Incredibles
- Tybalt in Gnomeo & Juliet
- Shmuel Frenkel in Waltz with Bashir
- Ichy in The Land Before Time IV: Journey Through the Mists
- Anchor in Finding Nemo
- Rudder in Finding Dory
- Carmine in The Wild
- Douche in Sausage Party
- Owen Garrison in Scooby-Doo! Mask of the Blue Falcon
- Moreno in Zarafa
- Skua Boss in Happy Feet, Happy Feet Two
- Kirby O'Neil in Teenage Mutant Ninja Turtles
- Oscar Proud in The Proud Family, The Proud Family Movie
- Vinny in Family Guy (season 12)
- Red Alert in Transformers: Armada
- Burt in Scooby-Doo! Camp Scare
- Igg in Barnyard
- Reggie in Racing Stripes
- Amon in The Legend of Korra
- Eddy's brother in Ed, Edd n Eddy's Big Picture Show
- Sancho Panza in Donkey Xote
- Ben in ChalkZone

==== Live action ====
- Stanley Goodspeed in The Rock
- Cameron Poe in Con Air
- Castor Troy in Face/Off
- Rick Santoro in Snake Eyes
- Frank Pierce in Bringing Out the Dead
- Jack Campbell in The Family Man
- Antonio Corelli in Captain Corelli's Mandolin
- Randall "Memphis" Raines in Gone in 60 Seconds
- Acid Yellow in Sonny
- Joe Enders in Windtalkers
- Roy Walker in Matchstick Men
- Ben Gates in National Treasure, National Treasure: Book of Secrets
- Yuri Orlov in Lord of War
- David Spritz in The Weather Man
- John McLoughlin in World Trade Center
- Edward Malus in The Wicker Man
- Cris Johnson in Next
- John Koestler in Knowing
- Terence McDonagh in Bad Lieutenant: Port of Call New Orleans
- Joe in Bangkok Dangerous
- Balthazar Blake in The Sorcerer's Apprentice
- John Milton in Drive Angry
- Behmen von Bleibruck in Season of the Witch
- Will Gerard in Seeking Justice
- Kyle Miller in Trespass
- Johnny Blaze / Ghost Rider in Ghost Rider: Spirit of Vengeance
- Will Montgomery in Stolen
- Jack Halcombe in The Frozen Ground
- Joe Ransom in Joe
- Evan Lake in Dying of the Light
- Rayford Steele in Left Behind
- Mike Lawford in Pay the Ghost
- Hank Forrester in Snowden
- Jim Stone in The Trust
- Troy in Dog Eat Dog
- Charles B. McVay III in USS Indianapolis: Men of Courage
- Brian in Inconceivable
- Mike Chandler in 211
- Red Miller in Mandy
- Al Fountain in Box of Moonlight
- Joey Knish in Rounders
- Dante Dominio in The Man Who Cried
- Jesus Quintana in The Big Lebowski, The Jesus Rolls
- John Stone in The Night Of
- Joel Milner in Grace of My Heart
- Crocker Johnson in Company Man
- Ray Brocco in The Good Shepherd
- Jim in Margot at the Wedding
- Dick Bell in What Just Happened
- Abner Doubleday in The Ridiculous 6
- Arthur "Bird" Capezio in God's Pocket
- Arnold in Gloria Bell
- Dusty Davis in Twister
- Freddie Miles in The Talented Mr. Ripley
- Dan Mahowny in Owning Mahowny
- Reverend Veasey in Cold Mountain
- Jon Savage in The Savages
- Father Brendan Flynn in Doubt
- Paul Zara in The Ides of March
- Plutarch Heavensbee in The Hunger Games: Catching Fire, The Hunger Games: Mockingjay – Part 1, The Hunger Games: Mockingjay – Part 2
- Eddie Morales in Aliens vs. Predator: Requiem
- Reuben Santiago in Pride and Glory
- Phil D'Andrea in Public Enemies
- Evandro Torres in The Drop
- Moises Beltran in Peppermint
- Phil Coulson in Iron Man, Iron Man 2, Thor, The Avengers, Captain Marvel, Agents of S.H.I.E.L.D.
- Gerald in Labor Day
- Paul in Spinning Man
- Champ Kind in Anchorman: The Legend of Ron Burgundy, Anchorman 2: The Legend Continues
- Bobby Jay Bliss in Thank You for Smoking
- Lambeau Fields in The Comebacks
- Ray Pekurny in EDtv
- Bill White in North Country
- Tobias Beckett in Solo: A Star Wars Story
- Cletus Kasady in Venom
- Tallahassee in Zombieland: Double Tap
- Carlos Oliveira in Resident Evil: Apocalypse, Resident Evil: Extinction, Resident Evil: Retribution
- William James in The Hurt Locker
- Vic Mackey in The Shield
- Vincent Savino in Vegas
- Jimmy McGill in Better Call Saul
- Earl Hickey in My Name Is Earl
- Dwight Hendricks in Memphis Beat
- Darrell Grant in Striptease
- Todd Nixon in The Men Who Stare at Goats
- Vince in Trouble with the Curve
- Skiptracer in Identity Thief
- John Boreman in Lovelace
- Harry Elliot in Endless Love
- Handsome Rob in The Italian Job
- Quentin Conners in Chaos
- John Crawford in War
- Farmer in In the Name of the King
- Terry Leather in The Bank Job
- Phil Broker in Homefront
- Sam Clayton in Feeling Minnesota
- Holland Dale "Pooh-Bear" Monty in The Salton Sea
- London in In Dubious Battle
- Sorrel Booker in Fallout
