= Hiro (TV channel) =

- "The Next Level"
- Country: Italy

Programming
- Language: Italian
- Picture format: 4:3

Ownership
- Owner: Mediaset

History
- Launched: December 8, 2008
- Closed: August 1, 2011

Availability

Terrestrial
- Mediaset Premium: LCN n/a

Hiro was an Italian television channel, owned by television network Mediaset. Aimed to a children and teens viewership, was launched in 2008 as part of Mediaset Premium pay television network. The channel was devoted to broadcasting anime programming. The last announcer of the channel was Italian voice actor Claudio Moneta. The channel's target audience was mostly kids 8-14, but also "children of yesteryear", as the channel mainly aired older anime titles. It also aired some European titles as well.

Since August 1, 2011, to March 31, 2013, the channel was transmitted only on line by Premium Net TV, with the service on demand. Hiro was later shut down.

== History ==
Hiro started broadcasting on December 8, 2008, on Mediaset Premium's new Mediaset Fantasy package, at 7am with King Arthur on the Mediaset 1 multiplex.

On October 5, 2009, the channel started broadcasting a 24-hour schedule. The new schedule launched with Hamtaro, later in the month, it was followed by the British series The Legends of Treasure Island (after its suspension from Italia 1) and Beyblade V-Force.

The channel routinely suspended its operations in order to give airtime and bandwidth for Mediaset Premium's football broadcasts.

On August 1, 2011, after airing Mermaid Melody Pichi Pichi Pitch, from 7am, the channel entered standby mode with the Mediaset Premium logo until 12pm, before definitively shutting down its operations on digital terrestrial and on cable. On the same day, Hiro became an on-demand channel on the Premium Play platform under the new name Premium Hiro.
