= Era mio fratello =

- Directed by: Claudio Bonivento
- Starring: Maurizio Aiello; Paolo Briguglia; Enzo De Caro; Stefano Dionisi; Massimo Ghini; Anna Valle; Pamela Villoresi
- Country of origin: Italy
- No. of episodes: 2

Production
- Running time: 95 min

Original release
- Network: Rai Uno
- Release: 30 September – 1 October 2007

Era mio Fratello (Translation: He was my Brother) is a two episode television miniseries that aired in 2007 on Rai Uno. The first episode aired on 30 September 2007 in Italy and the second episode aired on 1 October that same year. It is the first Italian television series having 'ndrangheta as main theme. Filming took place in Calabria, in the cities of Reggio Calabria, Palmi, Catona, Melito and Pentedattilo. The La Repubblica television critic Antonio Dipollina appreciated the miniseries, commenting that it has "the same rhythm and language of the most modern crime series".

== Synopsis ==
Two brothers are forced into very different lives after they part ways at a very young age. One will grow up to be like their underworld father while the other was raised by a police officer and follows the straight and narrow. Their lives are doomed to eventually intersect, pitting brother against brother.

== Cast ==
- Maurizio Aiello as Michele Palmisano
- Pasquale Anselmo as Ettore Lanfranchi
- Paolo Briguglia as Luca
- Maria Pia Calzone as Luisa Libertino
- Carlo Cartier as Dario Salerno
- Adriano Chiaramida as Don Giuseppe Palmisano
- Diletta D'Emilio as Lavinia Lanfranchi
- Enzo De Caro as Vincenzo Di Santo
- Nicola Di Gioia as Vullo
- Stefano Dionisi as Sante Palmisano
- Massimo Ghini as Paolo Cento
- Giorgio Gobbi as Carlo Brandi
- Fiorenza Tessari as Paola Lanfranchi
- Anna Valle as Maria Palmisano
- Pamela Villoresi as Ada Di Santo

== See also ==
- List of Italian television series
