= Massimo Lodolo =

Italian actor and voice actor (born 1959)

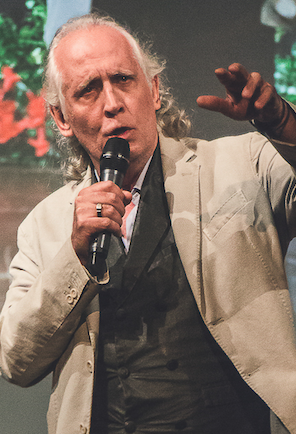
- Lodolo in 2018
- Born: 12 November 1959 (age 66); Rome, Italy
- Occupations: Actor; voice actor; dialogue writer; dubbing director
- Years active: 1965–present
- Relatives: Sandro Lodolo (uncle)

Massimo Lodolo (born 12 November 1959) is an Italian actor and voice actor.

== Biography ==
Born in Rome, Lodolo is of Friulian descent on his father's side of the family. He is the nephew of director and screenwriter Sandro Lodolo. He started out his career as a child starring in commercials directed by his uncle and he worked in the radio industry as a presenter during his teen years. As an actor, he starred in plays written by Oscar Wilde and Carlo Goldoni and also enjoyed success as a screen actor, participating in films such as the 1992 film Flight of the Innocent and the television series Caro maestro.

Lodolo is also renowned as a voice actor and dubber. He is typically known for dubbing malevolent, selfish, greedy and arrogant characters. He is best known for voicing Lucius Malfoy (portrayed by Jason Isaacs) in the Italian dub of the Harry Potter film franchise as well as Gopher in the Italian dub of the Winnie the Pooh franchise. Among the actors he is known for dubbing includes Vincent Cassel, Tim Roth, Andy García, Gary Oldman and Alfred Molina.

=== Personal life ===
Lodolo is currently in a relationship with the voice actress Benedetta Degli Innocenti, who is nearly 30 years his junior.

== Filmography ==
=== Cinema ===
- Stasera in quel palazzo (1991)
- Ask for the Moon (1991)
- Blu notte (1992)
- Flight of the Innocent (1992)
- Alto rischio (1993)
- Bits and Pieces (1996)
- Caro maestro - TV series (1996-1997)
- Ilona Arrives with the Rain (1996)
- Lucky and Zorba (1998) - voice
- Gli Smile and Go e il braciere di fuoco (2006) - voice
- Adrian - TV series (2019) - voice

== Dubbing roles ==
=== Animation ===
- Sarousch in The Hunchback of Notre Dame II
- Gopher in The Many Adventures of Winnie the Pooh, Pooh's Heffalump Halloween Movie
- Matt Groening, Gary Busey, Robert Wagner, Father Sean and Sideshow Bob (episode 17.8) in The Simpsons
- Lord Shen in Kung Fu Panda 2
- Moriarty in Sherlock Gnomes
- Frederick Sackville-Bagg in The Little Vampire 3D
- Colonel Cutter in Antz
- Yivo in Futurama: The Beast with a Billion Backs
- Bugs Bunny in Daffy Duck's Quackbusters
- Frankie Lino in Shark Tale
- Professor Mac Krill in Help! I'm a Fish
- Griffin in Quest for Camelot
- Thug Guard in The Great Mouse Detective
- Beaver in Lady and the Tramp (1997 redub)
- Emperor Maltazard in Arthur and the Invisibles, Arthur and the Revenge of Maltazard, Arthur 3: The War of the Two Worlds
- Lloyd Christmas in Dumb and Dumber
- Optimus Prime in Transformers: Robots in Disguise

=== Live action ===
- Lucius Malfoy in Harry Potter and the Chamber of Secrets, Harry Potter and the Goblet of Fire, Harry Potter and the Order of the Phoenix, Harry Potter and the Half-Blood Prince, Harry Potter and the Deathly Hallows – Part 1, Harry Potter and the Deathly Hallows – Part 2
- Marcus in Irréversible
- Mike Blueberry in Blueberry
- Brisseau in Secret Agents
- Joseph in Sheitan
- Jacques Mesrine in Mesrine
- Franck in Trance
- Gregori in Partisan
- Ringo "Pumpkin" in Pulp Fiction
- Drexl Spivey in True Romance
- Egor Korshunov in Air Force One
- Russell Casse in Independence Day
- Bishop Aringarosa in The Da Vinci Code
- John Pearce in Restoration
- Terry Benedict in Ocean's Eleven, Ocean's Twelve, Ocean's Thirteen
- Dominic Badguy in Muppets Most Wanted
- Barton Fink in Barton Fink
- Nathaniel Shepherd in The Space Between Us
- Jack Baldwin in End Game
- Vincent van Gogh in Vincent & Theo
- Charley Pearl in The Marrying Man
- Guildenstern in Rosencrantz & Guildenstern Are Dead
- Archie in Broken
- Ted in Four Rooms
- Detective Bryer in Arbitrage
- Roy in The Liability
- George Wallace in Selma
- Coach Jared in 1 Mile to You
- Emilio Lopez in Mr. Deeds
- Fatoush "Phantom" Hakbarah in You Don't Mess with the Zohan
- Ula in 50 First Dates
- Colonel J. Wesley McCullough in War for the Planet of the Apes
- John Shooter in Secret Window
- Rat King in The Nutcracker in 3D
- Morty in Click
- Enrico Pollini in Rat Race
- Amedeo Modigliani in Modigliani
- Jack Begosian in A Dark Truth
- Enrique Gorostieta in For Greater Glory
- Andrew Palma in Geostorm
- Otto Octavius / Doctor Octopus in Spider-Man 2
- Davide Rieti in The Moon and the Stars
- Jack Mellor in An Education
- Frank Burton in Abduction
- Doc in Swelter
- Carnegie in The Book of Eli
- Reynolds Woodcock in Phantom Thread
- Collector in Guardians of the Galaxy, Avengers: Infinity War
