= Forestia (video game) =

1998 video game

- Developer: Daddy Oak
- Publisher: LaserMedia
- Platforms: Windows, Mac OS
- Release: 1998
- Mode: Single-player

Forestia is a 1998 point-and-click edutainment video game by French developer Daddy Oak. With a first-person presentation mixing traditional animation and pre-rendered 3D, the player explores a forest, collecting flora and funga and photographing fauna. There are 9 chapters to complete which are randomly ordered.

== Synopsis ==
The game takes place in a floating forest island where the player completes various missions for its inhabitants. Sam, an anthropomorphic rabbit, gives the player guidance.

The Painting Present: The player needs to craft a painting as a birthday gift to Daddyoak, an anthropomorphic tree.

The Clouds: The player rides an airship to the mountain top to compete with Sam, which one is the faster to identify and draw animals from clouds.

The Little Siren: Everyone in the forest is hypnotized by a siren's song. The player needs to help the siren back to the ocean in order to break the hypnosis.

The Enchanted Mushrooms: Various forest animals become brightly recolored with polka dots after touching mushrooms, and the player needs to undo the affliction by arranging mushrooms in a fairy ring correctly.

The Fire Mountain: The most infamous and well known part of the game; everything turns red, a dragon tells the player to stop the evil sorcerer Morhurl from destroying the forest by rearranging the crystals at Morhurl's tower.

The Rocking Horse: The player crafts a rocking horse which was left unfinished by a lumberjack.

The Little Squirrel: The player plays a nature quiz board game with a know-it-all squirrel.

The Music Festival: After a party, the player participates at the local workshop in building musical instruments and a memory matching game.

The Queen of the ants' Secret Service: The player drinks a magic potion to shrink in order to enter an ant colony to deliver gift to the ant queen.

Upon completing all of the chapters, the player participates at the farewell party.

== Reception ==
The Hungarian magazine PC Format scored the game 78%. The Portuguese magazine Revista Player gave the game five stars. PC Gaming World gave it three stars, complimenting the rendering of the environments and saying that finding all the animals and plants "will keep interested youngsters hunting for some time".
