= Adrian (TV series) =

- Also known as: Adrian - La serie evento
- Genre: Animation; Science fiction; Dystopian fiction
- Created by: Adriano Celentano
- Written by: Adriano Celentano
- Screenplay by: Adriano Celentano and Vincenzo Cerami
- Story by: Adriano Celentano
- Directed by: Adriano Celentano
- Voices of: Adriano Celentano; Emanuela Rossi; Giuliana Nanni; Grazia Migneco; Pasquale Anselmo; Massimo Lodolo; Roberto Pedicini; Claudio Moneta; Ruggero Andreozzi; Giuliano Sangiorgi; Alessandro D'Errico; Marco Balzarotti; Andrea Oldani; Patrizio Prata; Luca Ghignone; Augusto Di Bono
- Composer: Nicola Piovani
- Country of origin: Italy
- Original language: Italian
- No. of episodes: 9

Production
- Executive producer: Claudia Mori
- Producers: Clan Celentano; China Beijing New Century Wit Technologies; Green Dreams Investments; SEK Studio (uncredited)
- Editor: Adriano Celentano
- Running time: 55-70 minutes

Original release
- Network: Canale 5 (Mediaset)
- Release: 21 January – 5 December 2019

Adrian (formerly known as Adrian - La serie evento) is a 2019 Italian adult animated series created and written by singer Adriano Celentano.

Vincenzo Cerami oversaw the screenplay, comic artist Milo Manara developed the character design and Nicola Piovani wrote the original soundtrack. Along with Celentano, students of Scuola Holden set up by Alessandro Baricco took part to the series.

It has been produced by Claudia Mori for Clan Celentano and its production lasted more than 10 years: announced in 2009 and initially destined for Sky, Adrian had been delayed several times due to contrasts between Clan Celentano and the production companies chosen for the realization of the cartoon, forcing Sky to reject the contract with Clan in 2012 because of the continuous delays. The project was then taken by Mediaset in 2015. The budget was about €28 million, and the cartoon was completed for Canale 5 in January 2019. Animations were made by thousands of animators in three continents (Asia, Africa and Europe) and they included more than 10,000 scenes.

26 episodes lasting about 22 minutes had been produced but then they had been edited in 9 episodes lasting about 55–70 minutes each, to be broadcast on prime time. Each episode had to be preceded by Aspettando Adrian, a live show from Teatro Camploy in Verona, with the presence of Celentano himself along with some famous Italian comedians. The broadcast of the first 4 episodes with that format occurred between 21 January and 4 February 2019; the series was then paused, officially because a sickness of Celentano but some critics argued also that the interruption was provoked by a severe audience flop, and it has continued since 7 November 2019 with a different live show.

== Plot ==
Set in a futuristic and dystopian Milan of 2068, the story tells the adventures of Adrian, a clockmaker of Gluck Street who has a love story with Gilda and fights for the freedom against the homologation imposed by an authoritarian regime. The future Italy is nominally governed by a democracy, but it is actually ruled by a few corrupted politicians and mainly by the mafia member Dranghestein. With the help of some disciples and under various fake identities, Adrian would lead a revolt against the regime.

== Characters ==
- Adrian: he is a smart and calm clockmaker who loves Gilda. During the series, he would assume several secret identities, like the Fox ("La Volpe") and Darian. He is voiced by Adriano Celentano.
- Gilda: she is the beautiful, sensual and brave fiancé of Adrian with a mysterious past. She is voiced by Emanuela Rossi.
- Anidride and Carbonica: two old sisters who are called "girls" by Adrian. Carbonica, the one with a purple headband, forgets everything while Anidride, the one with a yellow headband, is almost deaf. Wise but absent-minded, they console Adrian during difficult moments. They are voiced by Giuliana Nanni and Grazia Migneco.
- Orso and Carbone: two qualified police officers. They are respectively voiced by Pasquale Anselmo e Massimo Lodolo.
- Alto commissario: the chief of security whose only goal is to neutralize dissidents. He is voiced by Roberto Pedicini.
- Dranghestein: also known as "Il Dissanguatore" ("The Bleeder"), he is the ruthless owner of Mafia International. In order to achieve his purposes, he destroys the environment and imposes an authoritarian regime. He is voiced by Claudio Moneta.
- Johnny Silver: a narcissistic and whimsical rock-star. Initially envious and hostile to the clockmaker, he later becomes his loyal ally. He is voiced by Ruggero Andreozzi (speech) and Giuliano Sangiorgi (songs).
- Armand Letal: presenter of a popular talk show. He is voiced by Alessandro Maria D'Errico.
- Capo del governo ("The premier"): head of the Consiglio degli Anziani ("Council of the Elders") who is afraid only of Dranghestein. He is voiced by Marco Balzarotti.
- Marco: a 14 years old computer genius and great fan of the clockmaker, he is idealist, stubborn and rebel. He is voiced by Andrea Oldani.
- Oscar: main correspondent of the newspaper Verità Quotidiane, ("Daily Truths"), he is the only journalist who is truly critical of the leadership. He is voiced by Patrizio Prata.
- Narrator: voiced by Augusto Di Bono.

== Production ==
=== Development ===
Celentano had had an idea of an animated series since 2005, when an animated movie dedicated to him was announced for Christmas 2006. Initially, the project had involved also Vincenzo Cerami and Paolo Conte, but the production did not begin.

The Adrian project officially began in 2009, when Clan Celentano and Sky Italia signed an agreement for the airing of the series in 2011, with a cycle of 26 episodes animated with CGI. As advance payment, Clan Celentano made €7 million from the pay TV for half work, while the rest would be paid later for a total budget of €13 million. Famous comic artist Milo Manara was hired for the character design, Nicola Piovani for the original soundtrack and Vincenzo Cerami for the screenplay supervision: the project was also co-produced with Cometa Film of Enzo D'Alò. In 2010, Clan Celentano entered into a lawsuit with Cometa Film and stopped the collaboration with D'Alò: a dead-line prorogation (from 2011 to 2012) was requested to Sky, justified "for the complexity and innovation of the project", and Sky accepted. Mondo TV was hired as new producer, and animation was entrusted to the North Korean SEK Studio, but in 2011 a communique declared that the company «has been forced, unfortunately, to declare the resolution of the contract for the executive production of the animated TV series signed with Clan Celentano». Another lawsuit occurred in February 2012 and Mondo TV requested to Clan a compensation of €2 million. The offshoring in North Korea did not also lead to immediate results.

In 2012, after continuous claims by Sky, Clan asked a further delay (from 2012 to 2014), or a division of the series with the first 13 episodes to be aired in 2013 and the other 13 at the beginning of 2014, but the pay TV reacted removing Adrian from the schedules and asking the resolution of the contract because Clan did not fulfil its duties although it received much of the agreed capital. Sky declared:

Although our admiration for what Adriano Celentano has meant for the pop culture of our country, this can not justify more than three years of delay, and thus Sky has only requested to Clan Celentano to fulfil its duties.

Then, Clan replied:

After years of harsh work on our animated series 'Adrian', Sky Italia has suddenly requested the resolution of the contract with our company, claiming that it had not received the series in the provided period», menacing to begin a lawsuit for «the respect of the obligations agreed with Sky Italia in our regards and the reparation of all the damages, if Sky Italia continues to follow this line

However, in 2012 Mediaset, after organizing the two prime time shows of Rock Economy, was interested to produce the animated series. Only in summer 2015, after two years of rumours and legal problems, the network CEO Pier Silvio Berlusconi announced the airing of Adrian on Canale 5 in spring 2016. The news of a new unpublished album of Celentano with Mina delayed the broadcast of the project to February 2017 for 13 prime times, but the show was not broadcast the same.

Only after two years, the definitive broadcast of Adrian was announced in July 2018 for January 2019 on Canale 5.

=== Artistic crew ===
The series is created, written and directed by Adriano Celentano, who directed also the show preceding the cartoon and the editing.

Milo Manara created the character design, Nicola Piovani wrote the original soundtrack with the supervision of Celentano; students of Holden School of Alessandro Baricco took part to the screenwriting, while Vincenzo Cerami oversaw the scripts until his death in 2013.

=== Budget ===
According to Italian press, the budget used by Mediaset and Clan Celentano was €20-28 millions.

== Pre-show ==
From the first to the fourth episode, the brief pre-show Aspettando Adrian (Waiting Adrian) was aired live from Teatro Camploy in Verona, starring Nino Frassica, Francesco Scali, Natalino Balasso and Giovanni Storti; Celentano was also present but only with his voice and fast appearances. From the fifth episode, aired on 7 November 2019, the show was renamed in Adrian Live - Questa è la storia... (Adrian Live - This is the story...) and partially rewritten, presented directly by Celentano along with various guests.

== Soundtrack ==
On 25 January 2019, the soundtrack was published on CD and Vinyl with a total of 23 tracks.

== Broadcast ==
After the fourth episode, aired on 4 February 2019, the other two had to be aired on 12, 19 and 25 February and the last two on the next 4 and 5 March.

On 6 February, Mediaset and Clan Celentano announced that both Aspettando Adrian and the series would be interrupted for at least two weeks due to a "seasonal illness" of Adriano Celentano. However, after the planned two weeks, the show was not broadcast and it was delayed to autumn of the same year formally due to "health needs" of the singer but, according to some critics, also for the severe flop of audience. It was then announced that the cartoon would be aired together with an actual show of Celentano, more organized than the original Aspettando Adrian, in order to rise the audience.

During the presentation of the Mediaset schedules for the 2019–2020 season, CEO Pier Silvio Berlusconi confirmed the airing of the last episodes of Adrian in autumn, inside a live show with a greater participation of Celentano, and the cartoon was temporarily renamed as Adriano. The beginning of the broadcast was then planned for the 7 November 2019 on Canale 5 with the original name, but the pre-show was renamed as Adrian Live - Questa è la storia....

== Reception ==
The first episode of Aspettando Adrian had almost 6 millions of viewers and the 21,9% of share, while the cartoon had about 4,5 millions of viewers and the 19,1% of share, however destined to decrease in the following episodes. The series was criticized for various aspects, in particular for the poor pace of the show: Giorgio Simonelli on Il Fatto Quotidiano wrote:

A science-fiction tale with the usual struggle between good/beauty and the ugly, dirty, rotten powers. Despite the well-crafted explicit eroticism, the graceful bicycle rides, the echoes of Metropolis and Blade Runner in the background - 'frankly, I don't give a damn', to quote him who's quoting someone else.

— Giorgio Simonelli, Il Fatto Quotidiano

On la Repubblica, Alessandra Vitali wrote:

Much ado about nothing, one is tempted to say after Aspettando Adrian. Maybe the audience will end up enjoying the cartoon (Adrian) after all — it must have some meaning, if only for the big names in the opening credits, from Manara to Piovani to Cerami — while portraits glide by of a young Celentano, all pecs and lean muscle, and a young Claudia Mori with enviably bare glutes in the wind.

— Alessandra Vitali, la Repubblica

TV critic Aldo Grasso wrote on Corriere della Sera:

"Celentano is too wrapped up in himself to imagine a future. Even though Adrian is set in 2068, even though a corrupt Power rules through deceit and conformity, even though the architecture follows the classic blueprint of every dystopian vision, the story turns in circles like a clock, self‑referential: the watchmaker who saves the world. […] As for the live prologue, before saving the world, one should at least try saving appearances.

— Aldo Grasso, Corriere della Sera

Milo Manara himself, on a Facebook post, took distances from the cartoon, specifying that:

“As everyone who works in animation knows, these drawings were meant to be used as references for the creation of the actual animations. Once I delivered the drawings, therefore, I had absolutely no involvement, at any stage of the long and troubled production, in the making of the animations, since I am a draftsman, not an animator. I realize that the fact that some of my storyboard drawings ended up in the final animation — even though they were never created for that purpose — has caused further confusion. Unfortunately, the decision to use them was not mine, and at the time all I could do was express my strong misgivings about it.

— Milo Manara, Official Facebook Page

After first episodes, critics became more harsh: journalist Maurizio Costanzo firmly attacked the idea of Celentano stating that:

When you decide to build a TV show around your own work, you need to be humble rather than presumptuous, and you need to structure it properly from a television standpoint — the way Al Bano did, and the way Celentano did not.

— Maurizio Costanzo, Libero Quotidiano

After the new broadcast of the programme in November 2019, critics has continued despite the struggles of Mediaset to rise the audience. On the Italian edition of Huffington Post, Luigi Crespi wrote:

But this time his urge for renewal made him [Adriano] slip up. Wanting to change at all costs made him lose his identity, his recognizability, his uniqueness. He's become overexposed — I hope by mistake and not by choice — with a product as loudly hyped as it has been repeatedly rejected by the audience. Even though he brought in today's heavyweight TV figures, even though he reduced the role of the comics and made other changes to the original format, which was a real flop.

— Luigi Crespi, Huffington Post

On the pages of Oggi, Don Backy was heavier in his affirmations:

The flop of Adrian? I've been waiting fifty years for this moment. I was sure it wouldn't find an audience. It perfectly mirrors the 1980s film Joan Lin. That one was a failure too.

— Don Backy, Oggi

== Controversies ==
During its broadcast, the series had been the object of several controversies about some themes and the production in general:

- The series was criticized for the numerous erotic scenes showed in the first episode which was broadcast in prime time: the frequency of that kind of scenes was reduced in the following episodes.
- Numerous negative criticisms were provoked by the choice to include in the representation of the 2068 Naples, an enormous skyscraper identified as the headquarter of a company called "Mafia International", headed by the ruthless "Dranghestein" (a union of 'Ndrangheta and Frankenstein). That had been seen by various citizens as a stereotypical association of the Neapolitan city with clichés, reducing Naples to the "capital of organized crime". For that comparison, the association Noi Consumatori had announced a complaint against the broadcaster and Celentano. Moreover, the first episode ended about an hour before the planned end, forcing Mediaset to a rapid change of schedule.
- Other general criticisms were about a possible involving of the North Korean SEK Studio in the production of a series with a heavy libertarian nature: although the studio is not mentioned in the credits, it was evidenced that one of the reported production companies (the China Beijing New Century Wit Technologies) could have some links with North Korea.
- Various newspapers and journals had reported the audience outrage about the victim blaming showed in the second episode, where Adrian, dressed up as La Volpe, tells to two girls saved from a rape attempt that they should have drunk less in order to avoid an approach with disreputable guys. On 18 February 2019, showgirl Michelle Hunziker, in an interview on Leggo, explained why she had left the show due to a severe disorganization of the production, despite her admiration for Celentano, and she had united to the criticisms of victim blaming of the second episode.

== Episodes ==
| Episode | Air date | Audience | Share |
|---|---|---|---|
| 1 | 21 January 2019 | 4,544,000 | 19.07% |
| 2 | 22 January 2019 | 2,887,000 | 13.26% |
| 3 | 28 January 2019 | 2,038,000 | 10.55% |
| 4 | 4 February 2019 | 1,527,000 | 7.66% |
| 5 | 7 November 2019 | 1,859,000 | 10.44% |
| 6 | 14 November 2019 | 1,527,000 | 8,70% |
| 7 | 21 November 2019 | 1,485,000 | 9,60% |
| 8 | 28 November 2019 | 1,263,000 | 8,35% |
| 9 | 5 December 2019 | 1,517,000 | 8,90% |
