= Baldini =

Baldini is a surname of Italian origin. Notable people with this surname include:

- Andrea Baldini (born 1985), Italian foil fencer
- Antonella Baldini (born 1966), Italian voice actress
- Baccio Baldini (1436–c. 1487), Italian engraver
- Christian Baldini (born 1978), Italian/Argentine/American composer and conductor
- Daniele Baldini (born 1964), Italian footballer
- Elvezia Michel-Baldini (1887–1963), Swiss painter
- Emmanuele Baldini (born 1971), Italian violinist and conductor
- Enrico Baldini (born 1996), Italian footballer
- Ercole Baldini (1933–2022), Italian road-racing bicyclist and Olympic medalist
- Francesco Baldini (born 1974), Italian footballer
- Franco Baldini (born 1960), Italian footballer and football technical director
- Giuseppe Baldini (1922–2009), Italian footballer and manager
- Luca Baldini (born 1976), Italian swimmer
- Luisa Baldini (born ?), Australian-born UK journalist and presenter
- Marco Baldini (born 1959), Italian television personality and radio host
- Maria Teresa Baldini (born 1961), Italian politician, physician and basketball player
- Marino Baldini (born 1963), Croatian politician
- Nanni Baldini (born 1975), Italian voice actor
- Oreste Baldini (born 1962), Italian actor and voice actor
- Pietro Paolo Baldini (1614?–1684?), Italian painter of the Baroque era
- Raffaello Baldini (1924–2005), Italian writer and poet
- Renato Baldini (1921–1995), Italian film actor
- Sebastiano Baldini (1615–1685), Italian poet, librettist, and satirist
- Silvio Baldini (born 1958), Italian football manager
- Stefano Baldini (born 1971), Italian Olympic marathon runner
- Tiburzio Baldini (fl. early 17th century), Italian painter of the Baroque era
- Umberto Baldini (1921–2006), Italian art historian and restoration specialist
- Vittorio Baldini (died 1618), Italian printer and engraver

== Fictional characters ==
- Guglielmo Baldini, hoax entry in the 1980 edition of The New Grove Dictionary of Music and Musicians

== Other ==
- Baldini & Castoldi, Italian publishing company founded in 1897 (name changed to Dalai Editore in 2011)
