= Nanni Baldini =

Italian voice actor (born 1975)

- Born: Giovanni Baldini; 13 August 1975 (age 51); Rome, Italy
- Occupations: Voice actor; dialogue adapter
- Years active: 1990–present
- Children: 2
- Relatives: Antonella Baldini (sister); Oreste Baldini (brother); Rita Baldini (sister)

Giovanni "Nanni" Baldini (born 13 August 1975) is an Italian voice actor.

== Biography ==
Apart from voicing characters in the original version of the Winx franchise, Baldini is well known to the Italian-speaking audiences as the voice dubbing artist of characters such as Stewie Griffin from the animated sitcom Family Guy, Donkey from the Shrek film series as well as various characters in the Italian dub of the Robot Chicken segments, and, since 2002, the title character in the Scooby-Doo franchise and Alastor in Hazbin Hotel.

In live action shows, Baldini has dubbed Jack McFarland (portrayed by Sean Hayes) from Will & Grace, Pacey Witter (portrayed by Joshua Jackson) from Dawson's Creek, Christopher Turk (portrayed by Donald Faison) from Scrubs and the Eleventh Doctor (portrayed by Matt Smith) from Doctor Who. He dubs actors such as Kevin Hart, Adam Goldberg, Chris Rock, Topher Grace, Chris Tucker, Anthony Mackie and Michael Peña.

Baldini works at C.D. Cine Dubbing, LaBibi.it, Dubbing Brothers, Pumaisdue, and other dubbing studios in Italy.

=== Personal life ===
Baldini is the younger brother of Rita, Oreste and Antonella Baldini, who are also voice actors. Additionally, Baldini has two daughters, Elisa and Beatrice.

== Voice work ==
Year	Title	Role	Notes
1996	Alì Babà	Alì Babà	Animated film
2000	The Prince of Dinosaurs	Argy	Animated film
2005	Eppur si muove	Lello	Animated series
2007	Gli Smile and Go e il braciere di fuoco	Smilz	Animated film
2007	Winx Club	Brandon Sky	Animated series (season 3)
2010	Winx Club 3D: Magical Adventure	Guest #2	Animated film
2012	Pinocchio	The Coachman	Animated film
2014	Pet Pals in Windland	King Cyclone	Animated film
2014	Pet Pals in Windland	Tail	Animated film
2016–2017	World of Winx	Ace	Animated series

=== Dubbing ===
==== Films (Animation, Italian dub) ====
Year	Title	Role(s)	Ref
1995	A Goofy Movie	Bobby Zimuruski	
1997	Rurouni Kenshin: The Motion Picture	Sagara Sanosuke	
1999	South Park: Bigger, Longer & Uncut	Stan Marsh	
1999	Tarzan	Mungo	
2000	An Extremely Goofy Movie	Bobby Zimuruski	
2001	Monsters, Inc.	Needleman	
2001	Shrek	Donkey	
2001	Osmosis Jones	Osmosis Jones	
2001	Waking Life	Pinball Playing Man	
2001	Waking Life	Man on Back of Boat	
2002	Barbie as Rapunzel	Hobie	
2002	Inspector Gadget's Last Case: Claw's Revenge	Gadgetmobile	
2002	Lilo & Stitch	David Kawena	
2002	Kiki's Delivery Service	Radio Announcer	
2003	Stitch! The Movie	David Kawena	
2003	Brother Bear	Denahi	
2004	Team America: World Police	Carson	
2004	Shrek 2	Donkey	
2004	Shrek 4-D	Donkey	
2004	Boo, Zino & the Snurks	Zeck	
2004	Mickey's Twice Upon a Christmas	Donner	
2005	Lilo & Stitch 2: Stitch Has a Glitch	David Kawena	
2005	Robots	Tim	
2005	xxxHolic: A Midsummer Night's Dream	Kimihiro Watanuki	
2005	Hoodwinked!	Twitchy	
2006	Arthur and the Minimoys	Max	
2006	Scooby-Doo! Pirates Ahoy!	Scooby-Doo	
2006	Monster House	Reginald "Skull" Skulinski	
2006	Barnyard	Eddy	
2006	The Ugly Duckling and Me!	Wesley	
2006	Hui Buh: The Goofy Ghost	Charles	
2007	Meet the Robinsons	Carl	
2007	Chill Out, Scooby-Doo!	Scooby-Doo	
2007	TMNT	Michelangelo	
2007	Shrek the Third	Donkey	
2007	Bee Movie	Mooseblood	
2007	Ratatouille	Remy	
2008	Scooby-Doo! and the Goblin King	Scooby-Doo	
2008	Space Chimps	Dr. Jagu	
2008	Bolt	Blake	
2009	Arthur and the Revenge of Maltazard	Max	
2009	Scooby-Doo! and the Samurai Sword	Scooby-Doo	
2010	Shrek Forever After	Donkey	
2010	Marmaduke	Lightning	
2010	Cats & Dogs: The Revenge of Kitty Galore	Angus MacDougall	
2010	Scooby-Doo! Abracadabra-Doo	Scooby-Doo	
2010	Scooby-Doo! Camp Scare	Scooby-Doo	
2010	Toy Story 3	Sid Phillips	
2010	Megamind	Minion	
2010	Despicable Me	Dr. Nefario	
2011	Rango	Rango	
2012	Scooby-Doo! Music of the Vampire	Scooby-Doo	
2012	Big Top Scooby-Doo!	Scooby-Doo	
2012	The Suicide Shop	Psychiatrist	
2013	Planes	Ned	
2013	Planes	Zed	
2013	Despicable Me 2	Dr. Nefario	
2013	Escape from Planet Earth	Doc	
2013	Scooby-Doo! Mask of the Blue Falcon	Scooby-Doo	
2013	Scooby-Doo! Stage Fright	Scooby-Doo	
2013	Scooby-Doo! Adventures: The Mystery Map	Scooby-Doo	
2013	Free Birds	Reggie	
2013	Khumba	Nigel	
2014	Metegol	Loco	
2014	Scooby-Doo! WrestleMania Mystery	Scooby-Doo	
2014	Scooby-Doo! Frankencreepy	Scooby-Doo	
2014	The Nut Job	Mole	
2015	Scooby-Doo! Moon Monster Madness	Scooby-Doo	
2015	Scooby-Doo! and Kiss: Rock and Roll Mystery	Scooby-Doo	
2015	Mune: Guardian of the Moon	Spleen	
2015	Home	Oh	
2016	Robinson Crusoe	Papagei Dienstag	
2016	Sheep and Wolves	Ziko	
2016	Scooby-Doo! and WWE: Curse of the Speed Demon	Scooby-Doo	
2016	Lego Scooby-Doo! Haunted Hollywood	Scooby-Doo	
2016	Trolls	Cooper	
2017	The Nut Job 2: Nutty by Nature	Mole	
2017	Scooby-Doo! Shaggy's Showdown	Scooby-Doo	
2017	Lego Scooby-Doo! Blowout Beach Bash	Scooby-Doo	
2017	Cars 3	Cal Weathers	
2018	The Happytime Murders	Goofer	
2018	Scooby-Doo! & Batman: The Brave and the Bold	Scooby-Doo	
2018	Scooby-Doo! and the Gourmet Ghost	Scooby-Doo	
2018	Peter Rabbit	Johnny Town-Mouse	
2019	Scooby-Doo! and the Curse of the 13th Ghost	Scooby-Doo	
2019	Scooby-Doo! Return to Zombie Island	Scooby-Doo	
2019	Toy Story 4	Bunny	
2019	The Lego Movie 2: The Second Part	Benny	
2020	Trolls World Tour	Cooper	
2020	Trolls World Tour	Prince D	
2020	Scoob!	Scooby-Doo	
2020	Happy Halloween, Scooby-Doo!	Scooby-Doo	
2021	Peter Rabbit 2: The Runaway	Johnny Town-Mouse	
2021	Encanto	Agustín Madrigal	
2021	Scooby-Doo! The Sword and the Scoob	Scooby-Doo	
2021	Straight Outta Nowhere: Scooby-Doo! Meets Courage the Cowardly Dog	Scooby-Doo	
2021	Trick or Treat Scooby-Doo!	Scooby-Doo	
2022	Apollo 10 1/2: A Space Age Childhood	Kranz	
2022	Strange World	Caspian	
2022	Minions: The Rise of Gru	Dr. Nefario	
2022	Chip 'n Dale: Rescue Rangers	DJ Herzogenaurach	
2022	Wendell & Wild	Wendell	
2022	My Father's Dragon	Tamir	
2022	Scrooge: A Christmas Carol	Tom Jenkins	
2023	The Super Mario Bros. Movie	Toad	
2023	Ruby Gillman, Teenage Kraken	Brill Gillman	
2023	Trolls Band Together	Cooper	
2023	Trolls Band Together	Prince D	
2023	Spider-Man: Across the Spider-Verse	Lenny	
2023	Migration	Delroy	
2023	Chicken for Linda!	Serge	
2023	Merry Little Batman	Joker	
2024	Despicable Me 4	Dr. Nefario	
2024	Noah's Ark	Tito	
2024	That Christmas	Mr. McNutt	
2025	Gabby's Dollhouse: The Movie	Chumsley	
2026	The Super Mario Galaxy Movie	Toad	

==== Films (Live action, Italian dub) ====
Year	Title	Role(s)	Original actor	Ref
1988	Clara's Heart	David Hart	Neil Patrick Harris	
1993	Homeward Bound: The Incredible Journey	Peter Burnford-Seaver	Benj Thall	
1994	Sugar Hill	Kymie Daniels	Donald Faison	
1995	Hackers	Joey Pardella	Jesse Bradford	
1996	Jack Frusciante Left the Band	Martino	Alessandro Zamattio	
1996	William Shakespeare's Romeo + Juliet	Balthasar	Jesse Bradford	
1996	Scream	Billy Loomis	Skeet Ulrich	
1996	Swingers	Trent Walker	Vince Vaughn	
1996	Everyone Says I Love You	Scott Dandridge	Lukas Haas	
1996	Homeward Bound II: Lost in San Francisco	Peter Burnford-Seaver	Benj Thall	
1997	The Fifth Element	Ruby Rhod	Chris Tucker	
1997	Titanic	Fabrizio De Rossi	Danny Nucci	
1997	Flubber	Bennett Hoenicker	Wil Wheaton	
1998	Lethal Weapon 4	Lee Butters	Chris Rock	
1998	The Proposition	Roger Martin	Neil Patrick Harris	
1998	Rush Hour	James Carter	Chris Tucker	
1998	Senseless	Darryl Witherspoon	Marlon Wayans	
1998	The Dreamlife of Angels	Chriss	Grégoire Colin	
1998	What Dreams May Come	Albert Lewis / Ian Nielsen	Cuba Gooding Jr.	
1998	One True Thing	Brian Gulden	Tom Everett Scott	
1998	Pleasantville	Skip Martin	Paul Walker	
1998	BASEketball	Joe Cooper	Trey Parker	
1999	American Pie	Chris "Oz" Ostreicher	Chris Klein	
1999	The Matrix	Mouse	Matt Doran	
1999	Chill Factor	Tim Mason	Skeet Ulrich	
1999	EDtv	John	Adam Goldberg	
1999	All About My Mother	Esteban Echevarria	Eloy Azorín	
1999	Wing Commander	Todd "Maniac" Marshall	Matthew Lillard	
1999	Boys Don't Cry	Marvin "Tom" Nissen	Brendan Sexton III	
1999	Angela's Ashes	Frank McCourt	Ciarán Owens	
1999	Angela's Ashes	Frank McCourt	Michael Legge	
2000	The Flintstones in Viva Rock Vegas	Barney Rubble	Stephen Baldwin	
2000	Crime and Punishment in Suburbia	Jimmy	James DeBello	
2000	Finding Forrester	Jamal Wallace	Rob Brown	
2000	Nurse Betty	Wesley	Chris Rock	
2000	Bring It On	Cliff Pantone	Jesse Bradford	
2000	Traffic	Seth Abrahams	Topher Grace	
2000	Gossip	Beau Edson	Joshua Jackson	
2000	Road Trip	Barry Manilow	Tom Green	
2000	How the Grinch Stole Christmas	Drew Lou Who	Jeremy Howard	
2000	Billy Elliot	Tony Elliot	Jamie Draven	
2001	Kevin of the North	Kevin Manley	Skeet Ulrich	
2001	Down to Earth	Lance Barton	Chris Rock	
2001	Scary Movie 2	Tommy	James DeBello	
2001	A Beautiful Mind	Toby Keller	Alex Toma	
2001	Buffalo Soldiers	Garcia	Michael Peña	
2001	Rush Hour 2	James Carter	Chris Tucker	
2001	And Your Mother Too	Julio Zapata	Gael García Bernal	
2001	Ocean's Eleven	Joshua Jackson	Joshua Jackson	
2001	The Safety of Objects	Paul Gold	Joshua Jackson	
2001	Shallow Hal	Hal Larson	Jack Black	
2001	American Pie 2	Chris "Oz" Ostreicher	Chris Klein	
2001	The Last Castle	Sam Yates	Mark Ruffalo	
2001	Kate & Leopold	Charlie McKay	Breckin Meyer	
2001	Plaga zombie: zona mutante	Max Giggs	Hernán Sáez	
2001	Heist	Jimmy Silk	Sam Rockwell	
2001	Fat Girl	Fernando	Libero De Rienzo	
2002	Harry Potter and the Chamber of Secrets	Dobby	Toby Jones	
2002	Big Fat Liar	Frank Jackson	Donald Faison	
2002	Ali G Indahouse	Richard "Ricky C" Cunningham	Martin Freeman	
2002	Scooby-Doo	Scooby-Doo	Neil Fanning	
2002	The Salton Sea	Kujo	Adam Goldberg	
2002	Men in Black II	Scrad	Johnny Knoxville	
2002	Men in Black II	Charlie	Johnny Knoxville	
2002	Bend It Like Beckham	Tony	Ameet Chana	
2002	Jackass: The Movie	Chris Pontius	Chris Pontius	
2002	Clockstoppers	Zak Gibbs	Jesse Bradford	
2002	Frida	Alejandro Gómez Arias	Diego Luna	
2002	The Sum of All Fears	Dillon	Jamie Harrold	
2003	Head of State	Mays Gilliam	Chris Rock	
2003	The Cat in the Hat	Hank Humberfloob	Sean Hayes	
2003	A Man Apart	Demetrius Hicks	Larenz Tate	
2003	2 Fast 2 Furious	Orange Julius	Amaury Nolasco	
2003	How to Lose a Guy in 10 Days	Tony	Adam Goldberg	
2003	Love Actually	John	Martin Freeman	
2003	Kontroll	Laci	Làszlò Nàdasi	
2003	Superman	Young Clark Kent (2003 redub)	Jeff East	
2004	Barbershop 2: Back in Business	Kenard	Kenan Thompson	
2004	I, Robot	Farber	Shia LaBeouf	
2004	Win a Date with Tad Hamilton!	Pete Monash	Topher Grace	
2004	In Good Company	Carter Duryea	Topher Grace	
2004	P.S.	Francis Scott	Topher Grace	
2004	Scooby-Doo 2: Monsters Unleashed	Scooby-Doo	Neil Fanning	
2004	Around the World in 80 Days	Inspector Fix	Ewen Bremner	
2004	Crash	Peter Waters	Larenz Tate	
2004	The Day After Tomorrow	Simon	Adrian Lester	
2004	Kung Fu Hustle	Sing	Stephen Chow	
2005	Herbie: Fully Loaded	Ray Peyton Jr.	Breckin Meyer	
2005	Just Friends	Dusty Dinkleman	Chris Klein	
2005	Match Point	Inspector Dowd	Ewen Bremner	
2005	Monster-in-Law	Remy	Adam Scott	
2005	Wedding Crashers	Todd Cleary	Keir O'Donnell	
2006	Tenacious D in The Pick of Destiny	Jables / JB	Jack Black	
2006	The Science of Sleep	Stéphane Miroux	Gael García Bernal	
2006	Jackass Number Two	Chris Pontius	Chris Pontius	
2006	Material Girls	Henry Baines	Lukas Haas	
2006	Homie Spumoni	Renato Molina / Leroy	Donald Faison	
2006	Man About Town	Phil Balow	Adam Goldberg	
2006	The Sentinel	Aziz Hassad	Raoul Bhaneja	
2006	Step Up	Mac Carter	Damaine Radcliff	
2007	I Think I Love My Wife	Richard Cooper	Chris Rock	
2007	Balls of Fury	Randy Daytona	Dan Fogler	
2007	The Bucket List	Matthew	Sean Hayes	
2007	Rush Hour 3	James Carter	Chris Tucker	
2007	Charlie Wilson's War	Michael G. Vickers	Christopher Denham	
2008	The Express: The Ernie Davis Story	Ernie Davis	Rob Brown	
2008	Wanted	Barry	Chris Pratt	
2008	Fool's Gold	Bigg Bunny	Kevin Hart	
2008	Forgetting Sarah Marshall	Darald Braden	Jack McBrayer	
2008	Step Brothers	Derek Huff	Adam Scott	
2008	Soul Men	Danny Epstein	Sean Hayes	
2008	Baby Mama	Oscar Priyan	Romany Malco	
2008	The Love Guru	Darren Roanoke	Romany Malco	
2008	Milk	Dick Pabich	Joseph Cross	
2008	The Chronicles of Narnia: Prince Caspian	Pattertwig	Harry Gregson-Williams	
2008	Ip Man	Lin	Xing Yu	
2009	Alvin and the Chipmunks: The Squeakquel	Toby Seville	Zachary Levi	
2009	The Imaginarium of Doctor Parnassus	Anton	Andrew Garfield	
2009	Angels & Demons	Mr. Gray / Assassin	Nikolaj Lie Kaas	
2009	The Hangover	Eddie Palermos	Bryan Callen	
2009	Everybody's Fine	Art Director	Debargo Sanyal	
2009	Love Happens	Lane Marshall	Dan Fogler	
2009	Star Trek	Montgomery "Scotty" Scott	Simon Pegg	
2010	Alice in Wonderland	Hamish Ascot	Leo Bill	
2010	Harry Potter and the Deathly Hallows – Part 1	Dobby	Toby Jones	
2010	Valentine's Day	Jason Morris	Topher Grace	
2010	Predators	Edwin	Topher Grace	
2010	Skyline	Terry	Donald Faison	
2010	Going the Distance	Dan Grant	Charlie Day	
2010	Jackass 3D	Chris Pontius	Chris Pontius	
2010	The Losers	Captain Jake Jensen	Chris Evans	
2010	Secretariat	Eddie Sweat	Nelsan Ellis	
2010	The Nutcracker in 3D	Tinker	Hugh Sachs	
2010	Shutter Island	Peter Breene	Christopher Denham	
2010	Piranha 3D	Wet T-Shirt Host	Eli Roth	
2011	The Adventures of Tintin	Thompson	Simon Pegg	
2011	Beastly	Will Fratalli	Neil Patrick Harris	
2011	What's Your Number?	Simon	Martin Freeman	
2011	Take Me Home Tonight	Barry Nathan	Dan Fogler	
2011	Tower Heist	Enrique Dev'reaux	Michael Peña	
2011	Your Highness	Julie	Toby Jones	
2012	What to Expect When You're Expecting	Vic Mac	Chris Rock	
2012	American Reunion	Chris "Oz" Ostreicher	Chris Klein	
2012	A Thousand Words	Starbucks Barista	Jack McBrayer	
2012	The Campaign	Mr. Mendenhall	Jack McBrayer	
2012	Seven Psychopaths	Billy Bickle	Sam Rockwell	
2012	Silver Linings Playbook	Danny McDaniels	Chris Tucker	
2012	Bachelorette	Joe	Kyle Bornheimer	
2012	Flight	Gaunt Young Man	James Badge Dale	
2013	Star Trek Into Darkness	Montgomery "Scotty" Scott	Simon Pegg	
2013	Suck Me Shakespeer	Zeki Müller	Elyas M'Barek	
2013	The Big Wedding	Jared Griffin	Topher Grace	
2013	Last Vegas	Lonnie	Romany Malco	
2013	A.C.O.D.	Carter Spencer	Adam Scott	
2013	Begin Again	Dave Kohl	Adam Levine	
2013	A Haunted House	Malcolm Johnson	Marlon Wayans	
2013	Elysium	Julio	Diego Luna	
2013	Grudge Match	Dante Slate Jr.	Kevin Hart	
2013	Pacific Rim	Dr. Newton Geiszler	Charlie Day	
2013	Movie 43	Brian	Jack McBrayer	
2013	The Starving Games	Seleca	Dean West	
2013	Scary Movie 5	Ja'Marcus	Snoop Dogg	
2014	Captain America: The Winter Soldier	Sam Wilson / Falcon	Anthony Mackie	
2014	Ride Along	Ben Barber	Kevin Hart	
2014	About Last Night	Bernie	Kevin Hart	
2014	A Haunted House 2	Malcolm Johnson	Marlon Wayans	
2014	Fury	Trini "Gordo" Garcia	Michael Peña	
2015	Get Hard	Darnell Lewis	Kevin Hart	
2015	The Wedding Ringer	Jimmy Callahan	Kevin Hart	
2015	Suck Me Shakespeer 2	Zeki Müller	Elyas M'Barek	
2015	The DUFF	Principal Buchanan	Romany Malco	
2015	Avengers: Age of Ultron	Sam Wilson / Falcon	Anthony Mackie	
2015	Ant-Man	Sam Wilson / Falcon	Anthony Mackie	
2015	Love the Coopers	Percy Williams	Anthony Mackie	
2015	Truth	Mike Smith	Topher Grace	
2015	Trainwreck	Dr. Aaron Conners	Bill Hader	
2015	The Visit	Conductor	Samuel Stricklen	
2015	Ricki and the Flash	Troy	Aaron Moten	
2016	Fantastic Beasts and Where to Find Them	Jacob Kowalski	Dan Fogler	
2016	Ride Along 2	Ben Barber	Kevin Hart	
2016	Central Intelligence	Calvin Joyner / Golden Jet	Kevin Hart	
2016	Alice Through the Looking Glass	Hamish Ascot	Leo Bill	
2016	Star Trek Beyond	Montgomery "Scotty" Scott	Simon Pegg	
2016	Captain America: Civil War	Sam Wilson / Falcon	Anthony Mackie	
2016	Almost Christmas	Christian Meyers	Romany Malco	
2016	Love & Friendship	Sir James Martin	Tom Bennett	
2017	Fifty Shades of Black	Christian Black	Marlon Wayans	
2017	Jumanji: Welcome to the Jungle	Franklin "Mouse" Finbar	Kevin Hart	
2017	Little Evil	Gary Bloom	Adam Scott	
2017	The Disaster Artist	Adam Scott	Adam Scott	
2017	This Crazy Heart	Lennard Reinhard	Elyas M'Barek	
2017	Girls Trip	Julian Stevens	Larenz Tate	
2017	Power Rangers	Alpha 5	Bill Hader	
2017	Alibi.com	Grégory Van Huffel	Philippe Lacheau	
2017	Marry Me, My Dude	Fred	Philippe Lacheau	
2017	Transformers: The Last Knight	Mohawk	Reno Wilson	
2018	Avengers: Infinity War	Sam Wilson / Falcon	Anthony Mackie	
2018	Fantastic Beasts: The Crimes of Grindelwald	Jacob Kowalski	Dan Fogler	
2018	The Spy Who Dumped Me	Duffer	Hasan Minhaj	
2018	Pacific Rim Uprising	Dr. Newton Geiszler	Charlie Day	
2018	Night School	Teddy Walker	Kevin Hart	
2018	The Most Hated Woman in America	Jack Ferguson	Adam Scott	
2018	Dear Dictator	Dr. Charles Seaver	Seth Green	
2019	Jumanji: The Next Level	Franklin "Mouse" Finbar	Kevin Hart	
2019	Io	Micah	Anthony Mackie	
2019	Avengers: Endgame	Sam Wilson / Falcon	Anthony Mackie	
2019	Running with the Devil	The Snitch	Adam Goldberg	
2019	It Chapter Two	Mike Hanlon	Isaiah Mustafa	
2019	A Dog's Journey	Boss Dog	Josh Gad	
2020	The Banker	Bernard Garrett	Anthony Mackie	
2020	Monster Hunter	Axe	MC Jin	
2021	Fatherhood	Matthew Logelin	Kevin Hart	
2021	Outside the Wire	Leo	Anthony Mackie	
2021	The Woman in the Window	Edward Fox	Anthony Mackie	
2021	Clifford the Big Red Dog	Veterinarian	Kenan Thompson	
2021	Superwho?	Cédric Dugimont / Badman	Philippe Lacheau	
2021	Spoiled Brats	Philippe Bartek	Artus	
2022	Fantastic Beasts: The Secrets of Dumbledore	Jacob Kowalski	Dan Fogler	
2022	The Man from Toronto	Teddy Jackson	Kevin Hart	
2022	Me Time	Sonny Fisher	Kevin Hart	
2022	Jackass Forever	Chris Pontius	Chris Pontius	
2022	I Want You Back	Peter	Charlie Day	
2022	The Curse of Bridge Hollow	Howard Gordon	Marlon Wayans	
2022	Babylon	George Munn	Lukas Haas	
2022	Scream	Billy Loomis	Skeet Ulrich	
2022	Amsterdam	Milton King	Chris Rock	
2022	Against the Ice	Carl Unger	Frankie Wilson	
2022	Samaritan	Albert Casler	Martin Starr	
2023	We Have a Ghost	Frank Presley	Anthony Mackie	
2023	Ghosted	Sam's grandson	Anthony Mackie	
2023	Scream VI	Billy Loomis	Skeet Ulrich	
2023	Alibi.com 2	Grégory Van Huffel	Philippe Lacheau	
2023	Air	Howard White	Chris Tucker	
2023	Wonka	Arthur Slugworth	Paterson Joseph	
2024	Lift	Cyrus Whitaker	Kevin Hart	
2024	Borderlands	Roland Greaves	Kevin Hart	
2024	It Ends with Us	Marshall	Hasan Minhaj	
2024	Wicked	Pfannee	Bowen Yang	
2024	A Complete Unknown	Albert Grossman	Dan Fogler	
2024	City Hunter	Hideyuki Makimura	Masanobu Ando	
2024	Inheritance	Karol	Piotr Polak	
2024	Nice Girls	Cassati	Lucien Jean-Baptiste	
2024	Here	John Harter	Gwilym Lee	
2024	Unstoppable	Adam Amin	Adam Amin	
2025	Captain America: Brave New World	Sam Wilson / Falcon	Anthony Mackie	
2025	Snow White	Quigg	George Appleby	
2025	Wicked: For Good	Pfannee	Bowen Yang	
2025	Love Hurts	Marvin Gable	Ke Huy Quan	
2025	The Phoenician Scheme	Sergio	Richard Ayoade	
2025	Almost Cops	Jack	Werner Kolf	
2025	Caught Stealing	Russ Miner	Matt Smith	
2025	An Honest Life	Fredde	Lucas Grimstedt	
2025	No Other Choice	Ko Si-jo	Cha Seung-won	

==== Television (Animation, Italian dub) ====
Year	Title	Role(s)	Notes	Ref
1995	Looney Tunes	Hubie	Main cast (1990s redubs)	
1995	Merrie Melodies	Hubie	Main cast (1990s redubs)	
1995–present	The Simpsons	Nelson Muntz	Recurring role (seasons 8–15)	
1995–present	The Simpsons	Snake Jailbird	Recurring role (season 11-13)	
1995–present	The Simpsons	Kearney Zzyzwicz	Recurring role (season 8-12)	
1995–present	The Simpsons	Various characters	Recurring role	
1997–2001	Teletubbies	Tinky Winky	Main cast (1st voice)	
1998–1999	Hercules: The Animated Series	Icarus	Main cast	
1998–1999	Princess Sissi	Franz	Main cast	
2000–present	Futurama	Slurms McKenzie	2 episodes	
2000–present	Futurama	Various characters	Recurring role	
2000–present	Family Guy	Stewie Griffin	Main cast	
2000–present	Family Guy	Johnny Knoxville	1 episode (season 7, episode 5)	
2000–present	Family Guy	Various characters	Recurring role	
2001	Excel Saga	Tooru Watanabe	Recurring role	
2001–2002	Digimon Adventure 02	Wormmon	Recurring role	
2004–2007	Lilo & Stitch: The Series	David Kawena	Recurring role	
2004–2008	What's New, Scooby-Doo?	Scooby-Doo	Main cast	
2005	The Proud Family Movie	15 Cent	TV film	
2005	The Fairly OddParents	Flappy Bob	1 episode (season 4, episode 20)	
2005–2006	MegaMan NT Warrior	Mr. Match	Recurring role	
2005–2006	MegaMan NT Warrior	WackoMan	Recurring role	
2005–2009	American Dragon: Jake Long	Huntsboy #89	Recurring role	
2006	Dai-Guard	Shunsuke Akagi	Main cast	
2006–present	American Dad!	Jeff Fischer	Recurring role	
2007	Shrek the Halls	Donkey	TV special	
2007–2008	Shaggy & Scooby-Doo Get a Clue!	Scooby-Doo	Main cast	
2007–2008	Gintama	Tatsuma Sakamoto	Main cast (season 1)	
2007–2009	Yin Yang Yo!	Carl	Main cast	
2010	Scared Shrekless	Donkey	TV special	
2010–2012	The Cleveland Show	Stewie Griffin	3 episodes	
2011	Scooby-Doo! Legend of the Phantosaur	Scooby-Doo	TV film	
2011	Ice Age: A Mammoth Christmas	Prancer	TV special	
2011–2013	Scooby-Doo! Mystery Incorporated	Scooby-Doo	Main cast	
2012	Scooby-Doo! Spooky Games	Scooby-Doo	TV special	
2012	Scooby-Doo! Haunted Holidays	Scooby-Doo	TV special	
2013	Scooby-Doo! and the Spooky Scarecrow	Scooby-Doo	TV special	
2013	Scooby-Doo! Mecha Mutt Menace	Scooby-Doo	TV special	
2014	Scooby-Doo! Ghastly Goals	Scooby-Doo	TV special	
2014-2015	The Day My Butt Went Psycho!	Deuce	Main cast	
2014–2016	Sanjay and Craig	Craig Slithers	Main cast	
2015	Lego Scooby-Doo! Knight Time Terror	Scooby-Doo	TV special	
2015	Scooby-Doo! and the Beach Beastie	Scooby-Doo	TV special	
2015–2017	Be Cool, Scooby-Doo!	Scooby-Doo	Main cast	
2015–2023	Alvinnn!!! and the Chipmunks	David Seville	Main cast	
2016–2019	The Powerpuff Girls	Narrator	Main cast	
2016–2024	The Lion Guard	Cheezi	Recurring role	
2016–present	Robot Chicken	Various characters	Main cast	
2017	Tangled: Before Ever After	Eugene Fitzherbert / Flynn Rider	TV film	
2017–2020	Rapunzel's Tangled Adventure	Eugene Fitzherbert / Flynn Rider	Main cast	
2018	Tenacious D in Post-Apocalypto	JB	Web series	
2018–2020	Trolls: The Beat Goes On!	Cooper	Main cast	
2019–2021	Scooby-Doo and Guess Who?	Scooby-Doo	Main cast	
2019–present	Bluey	Bandit Heeler	Main cast	
2021–2022	Trolls: TrollsTopia	Cooper	Main cast	
2024–present	Hazbin Hotel	Alastor	Main cast	

==== Television (Live action, Italian dub) ====
Year	Title	Role(s)	Notes	Original actor	Ref
2000–2003	Dawson's Creek	Pacey Witter	Main cast	Joshua Jackson	
2001–2006, 2017–2020	Will & Grace	Jack McFarland	Main cast	Sean Hayes	
2003–2007	Less than Perfect	Kipp Steadman	Main cast	Zachary Levi	
2003–2010	Scrubs	Christopher Turk	Main cast	Donald Faison	
2004	Pride	Fleck	TV film	Martin Freeman	
2005–2007	Everwood	Ephram Brown	Main cast	Gregory Smith	
2006–2009	Everybody Hates Chris	Narrator	Main cast	Chris Rock	
2008–2012	Chuck	Chuck Bartowski	Main cast	Zachary Levi	
2010–2015	Glee	Blaine Anderson	Main cast (seasons 2–3)	Darren Criss	
2011–2014	Doctor Who	Eleventh Doctor	Main cast	Matt Smith	
2013	Die versprochene Braut	Andrew Christie	TV film	Jochen Schropp	
2013	Christmas Bounty	James	TV film	Will Greenberg	
2015	Damaged	Sam Luck	TV film	Chris Klein	
2015–2019	Unbreakable Kimmy Schmidt	Titus Andromedon	Main cast	Tituss Burgess	

==== Video games (Italian dub) ====
Year	Title	Role(s)	Ref
2002	Harry Potter and the Chamber of Secrets	Dobby	
2007	Shrek Smash n' Crash Racing	Donkey	
2007	Ratatouille	Remy	
2009	Up	Narrator	
2013	Disney Infinity	Terry	
2016	Lego Dimensions	Scooby-Doo	
2025	Death Stranding 2: On the Beach	Dollman	
