= Oreste Baldini =

Italian voice actor

- Born: 8 July 1962 (age 64); Milan, Italy
- Occupations: Actor; voice actor; dubbing director; adapter; sculptor; painter; scenographer
- Years active: 1974–present
- Relatives: Antonella Baldini (sister); Nanni Baldini (brother); Rita Baldini (sister)

Oreste Baldini (born 8 July 1962) is an Italian actor, voice actor and dubbing director. After entering the film industry as a child performing in The Godfather Part II and The Flower in His Mouth, he later found a successful career as a voice actor in both animated and live action films.

== Biography ==
Born in Milan and the brother of voice actors Antonella, Rita and Nanni, Oreste Baldini made his international screen debut at twelve years of age in 1974, portraying Vito Corleone as a child in the opening scenes of The Godfather Part II, also acting in the film The Flower in His Mouth the following year.

Besides performing a few other film and television roles, Baldini later found success as a voice actor, dubbing characters into the Italian language and voicing Italian animated characters. He regularly dubs John Cusack in Italian and has dubbed Ken Jeong, Noah Taylor, David Arquette, Ludacris, Tim Roth, Seth Rogen, and Johnny Depp in some of their movies. Baldini's Italian voice dubbing roles include King Julien XIII in the Madagascar films, Shaggy Rogers in Scooby-Doo, Courage in Courage the Cowardly Dog, Sideshow Mel in The Simpsons, Quackerjack in Darkwing Duck, George McFly in Back to the Future, Dewey Riley in the Scream saga, Tej Parker in the Fast & Furious franchise, and Leslie Chow in The Hangover films. Baldini works at C.D. Cine Dubbing, LaBibi.it, Dubbing Brothers, Pumaisdue, and other Italian dubbing studios.

Baldini is also a sculptor and painter, showcasing in Rome, Milan, Tokyo and New York. In 2019, some works of his appeared at the Museo nazionale etrusco di Villa Giulia in the exhibition Acqua ("Water"), focused on environmentalism, followed by Bastabuste ("Stop plastic bags") in 2021 with the painting Dantenostrum. Inferni in terra, a 40-meters tribute to Dante Alighieri. He has designed sets for theatre plays.

== Filmography ==
=== Cinema ===
Year	Title	Role	Notes
1974	The Godfather Part II	Vito Corleone, aged nine	
1975	The Flower in His Mouth	Nicola Bellocampo	
1998	Kinekiller	Spectator	Short film
2008	Diari del Novecento	Arthur Schnitzler, Zino Zini	Documentary

=== Television ===
Year	Title	Role	Notes
1989	Come stanno bene insieme		TV miniseries, 1 episode
2005	Il capitano		TV series
2011	Fratelli detective		TV series, 1 episode

== Voice work ==
Year	Title	Role	Notes
2004	I Roteò e la magia dello specchio	Knight	Animated film
2007	Bentornato Pinocchio	The Cat	Animated film
2016	Ukon il Samurai	Voice-over	Documentary
2018	Leo Da Vinci: Mission Mona Lisa	Storyteller	Animated film
2019	The Bears' Famous Invasion of Sicily	Palace Guards	Animated film
2021–present	Pinocchio and Friends	Mastro Ciliegia	Animated series
2023	A Greyhound of a Girl	Dr. Patel	Animated film

=== Dubbing ===
==== Films (Animation, Italian dub) ====
Year	Title	Role(s)	Ref
1991	Dragon Ball Z: Lord Slug	Angira	
2000	Buzz Lightyear of Star Command: The Adventure Begins	XR	
2001	Waking Life	Protagonist	
2001	Monsters, Inc.	Bile	
2003	Looney Tunes: Back in Action	Shaggy Rogers	
2005	Madagascar	King Julien XIII	
2005	Hoodwinked!	Jimmy Lizard	
2006	Scooby-Doo! Pirates Ahoy!	Shaggy Rogers	
2006	The Wild	Hamir	
2006	Curious George	Ted / The Man with the Yellow Hat	
2006	Hui Buh: The Goofy Ghost	Hui Buh / Ritter Balduin	
2006	The Barbie Diaries	Mr. Wexler	
2007	Chill Out, Scooby-Doo!	Shaggy Rogers	
2007	The Simpsons Movie	Sideshow Mel	
2007	The Transformers: The Movie	Starscream (2007 redub)	
2008	Scooby-Doo! and the Goblin King	Shaggy Rogers	
2008	Madagascar: Escape 2 Africa	King Julien XIII	
2008	The Missing Lynx	Gus	
2008	Futurama: Bender's Game	Walt	
2008	The Tale of Despereaux	Despereaux Tilling	
2008	Igor	Igor	
2009	G-Force	Hurley	
2009	Curious George 2: Follow That Monkey!	Ted / The Man with the Yellow Hat	
2009	Scooby-Doo! and the Samurai Sword	Shaggy Rogers	
2009	A Town Called Panic	Cowboy	
2009	Cloudy with a Chance of Meatballs	Flint Lockwood	
2010	Scooby-Doo! Abracadabra-Doo	Shaggy Rogers	
2010	Scooby-Doo! Camp Scare	Shaggy Rogers	
2010	Hutch the Honeybee	Minmin	
2011	Lilly the Witch: The Journey to Mandolan	Hektor	
2011	Space Dogs	Lenny	
2011	Scooby-Doo! Legend of the Phantosaur	Shaggy Rogers	
2011	Cars 2	Siddeley	
2011	Arthur Christmas	Arthur Claus	
2012	Madagascar 3: Europe's Most Wanted	King Julien XIII	
2012	Scooby-Doo! Music of the Vampire	Shaggy Rogers	
2012	Big Top Scooby-Doo!	Shaggy Rogers	
2012	Hotel Transylvania	Mr. Fly	
2013	Scooby-Doo! Mask of the Blue Falcon	Shaggy Rogers	
2013	Scooby-Doo! Stage Fright	Shaggy Rogers	
2013	Scooby-Doo! Adventures: The Mystery Map	Shaggy Rogers	
2013	Turbo	Kim-Ly	
2013	Planes	Dusty Crophopper	
2013	Cloudy with a Chance of Meatballs 2	Flint Lockwood	
2014	Scooby-Doo! WrestleMania Mystery	Shaggy Rogers	
2014	Scooby-Doo! Frankencreepy	Shaggy Rogers	
2014	Planes: Fire & Rescue	Dusty Crophopper	
2014	Penguins of Madagascar	King Julien XIII	
2015	Scooby-Doo! Moon Monster Madness	Shaggy Rogers	
2015	Scooby-Doo! and Kiss: Rock and Roll Mystery	Shaggy Rogers	
2015	Curious George 3: Back to the Jungle	Ted / The Man with the Yellow Hat	
2015	Minions	News Reporter	
2016	Scooby-Doo! and WWE: Curse of the Speed Demon	Shaggy Rogers	
2016	Lego Scooby-Doo! Haunted Hollywood	Shaggy Rogers	
2016	Kung Fu Panda 3	Crane	
2016	Rock Dog	Angus Scattergood	
2017	Richard the Stork	Kiki	
2017	Scooby-Doo! Shaggy's Showdown	Shaggy Rogers	
2017	Lego Scooby-Doo! Blowout Beach Bash	Shaggy Rogers	
2017	The Nut Job 2: Nutty by Nature	Mr. Feng	
2017	Lu Over the Wall	Chairman	
2018	Peter Rabbit	JW Rooster II	
2018	The Happytime Murders	Augustus Bumblypants	
2018	Maya the Bee: The Honey Games	Craig	
2018	Scooby-Doo! & Batman: The Brave and the Bold	Shaggy Rogers	
2018	Scooby-Doo! and the Gourmet Ghost	Shaggy Rogers	
2018	Ploey: You Never Fly Alone	Skua	
2018	The Stolen Princess	Fin	
2019	Scooby-Doo! and the Curse of the 13th Ghost	Shaggy Rogers	
2019	Scooby-Doo! Return to Zombie Island	Shaggy Rogers	
2019	Captain Sabertooth and the Magic Diamond	Benjamin	
2019	The Queen's Corgi	Jack	
2019	The Big Trip	Duke	
2019	Curious George 4: Royal Monkey	Ted / The Man with the Yellow Hat	
2020	Scoob!	Shaggy Rogers	
2020	Happy Halloween, Scooby-Doo!	Shaggy Rogers	
2020	Curious George 5: Go West, Go Wild	Ted / The Man with the Yellow Hat	
2020	Soul	Moonwind	
2021	Peter Rabbit 2: The Runaway	JW Rooster II	
2021	Willy's Wonderland	Willy Weasel	
2021	Scooby-Doo! The Sword and the Scoob	Shaggy Rogers	
2021	Straight Outta Nowhere: Scooby-Doo! Meets Courage the Cowardly Dog	Courage	
2021	Straight Outta Nowhere: Scooby-Doo! Meets Courage the Cowardly Dog	Shaggy Rogers	
2021	Extinct	Clarance	
2021	Curious George: Cape Ahoy	Ted / The Man with the Yellow Hat	
2022	Trick or Treat Scooby-Doo!	Shaggy Rogers	
2023	Mummies	Lord Sylvester Carnaby	
2023	Teenage Mutant Ninja Turtles: Mutant Mayhem	Splinter	
2023	Resident Evil: Death Island	JJ	

==== Films (Live action, Italian dub) ====
Year	Title	Role(s)	Original actor	Ref
1979	The Muppet Movie	Max	Austin Pendleton	
1984	Camila	Ignacio	Boris Rubaja	
1985	Back to the Future	George McFly	Crispin Glover	
1987	Mak Π 100	Paolo Casati	Jonathan Horn	
1987	The Glass Menagerie	Tom Wingfield	John Malkovich	
1988	Heathers	Ram Sweeney	Patrick Labyorteaux	
1988	Another Woman	Laura’s boyfriend	Josh Hamilton	
1990	The Grifters	Roy Dillon	John Cusack	
1990	Wings of Fame	Brian Smith	Colin Firth	
1990	Days of Being Wild	Tide	Andy Lau	
1991	Little Man Tate	Eddie	Harry Connick Jr.	
1991	Career Opportunities	Jim Dodge	Frank Whaley	
1991	The Texas Chain Saw Massacre	Kirk (1991 redub)	William Vail	
1992	Reservoir Dogs	Freddy Newendyke / Mr. Orange	Tim Roth	
1992	Noises Off	Garry Lejeune / Roger Tramplemain	John Ritter	
1992	Stay Tuned	Roy Knable	John Ritter	
1993	Bodies, Rest & Motion	Nick	Tim Roth	
1993	The Three Musketeers	D'Artagnan	Chris O'Donnell	
1993	Swing Kids	Thomas Berger	Christian Bale	
1993	Judgment Night	Mike Peterson	Cuba Gooding Jr.	
1994	Ed Wood	Ed Wood	Johnny Depp	
1994	Captives	Philip Chaney	Tim Roth	
1994	Malice	Dennis Riley	Peter Gallagher	
1994	The Mask	Mr. Dickey	Eamonn Roche	
1994	The Shadow	Nelson	Ethan Phillips	
1994	Sugar Hill	Romello "Rome" Skuggs	Wesley Snipes	
1995	Rumble in the Bronx	Ma Hon Keung	Jackie Chan	
1995	Thunderbolt	Chan Foh To	Jackie Chan	
1995	Nick of Time	Gene Watson	Johnny Depp	
1995	Underground	Ivan Dren	Slavko Štimac	
1996	Scream	Dewey Riley	David Arquette	
1996	Everyone Says I Love You	Charles Ferry	Tim Roth	
1996	First Strike	Jackie	Jackie Chan	
1997	Con Air	Vince Larkin	John Cusack	
1997	Scream 2	Dewey Riley	David Arquette	
1997	Lost Highway	Pete Dayton	Balthazar Getty	
1997	Gridlock'd	Alexander "Stretch" Rawland	Tim Roth	
1997	Fireworks	Nakamura	Susumu Terajima	
1998	Kissing a Fool	Max Abbitt	David Schwimmer	
1998	Enemy of the State	Agent Selby	Seth Green	
1998	Zero Effect	Steve Arlo	Ben Stiller	
1998	The Barber of Siberia	Andrej Tolstoy	Oleg Menshikov	
1998	Small Soldiers	Larry Benson	Jay Mohr	
1999	Deterrence	Ralph	Sean Astin	
1999	Cradle Will Rock	Nelson Rockefeller	John Cusack	
1999	Inspector Gadget	John Brown / Inspector Gadget	Matthew Broderick	
1999	Summer of Sam	Ritchie	Adrien Brody	
1999	200 Cigarettes	Disco Cabbie	Dave Chappelle	
2000	Keeping the Faith	Jake Schram	Ben Stiller	
2000	Scream 3	Dewey Riley	David Arquette	
2000	Lucky Numbers	Gig	Tim Roth	
2000	The Crow: Salvation	Stanley Roberts	Walton Goggins	
2000	Brother 2	Danila Bagrov	Sergei Bodrov Jr.	
2001	In the Shadows	Draven	Cuba Gooding Jr.	
2001	America's Sweethearts	Eddie Thomas	John Cusack	
2001	High Heels and Low Lifes	McGill	Kevin Eldon	
2001	Ichi the Killer	Kakihara	Tadanobu Asano	
2001	One and Two Makes Four	Arun Verma	Shah Rukh Khan	
2001	Mulholland Drive	Joe Messing	Mark Pellegrino	
2001	Hollywood Palms	Clark	Patrick Labyorteaux	
2001	Super Troopers	Carl Foster	Paul Soter	
2001	Lara Croft: Tomb Raider	Bryce	Noah Taylor	
2001	He Died with a Felafel in His Hand	Danny Kirkhope	Noah Taylor	
2001	Black Hawk Down	Matt Eversmann	Josh Hartnett	
2001	Jay and Silent Bob Strike Back	Brent	Seann William Scott	
2002	Eight Legged Freaks	Chris McCormick	David Arquette	
2002	Scooby-Doo	Shaggy Rogers	Matthew Lillard	
2002	Death to Smoochy	Sheldon Mopes	Edward Norton	
2002	Minority Report	Norbert "Wally" Wallace	Daniel London	
2002	Panic Room	Junior	Jared Leto	
2003	2 Fast 2 Furious	Tej Parker	Ludacris	
2003	Looney Tunes: Back in Action	Damian "DJ" Drake, Jr.	Brendan Fraser	
2003	Looney Tunes: Back in Action	Brendan Fraser	Brendan Fraser	
2003	Scary Movie 3	Ross Giggins	Jeremy Piven	
2003	Lara Croft: Tomb Raider – The Cradle of Life	Bryce	Noah Taylor	
2003	Dreamcatcher	Pete Moore	Timothy Olyphant	
2003	11:14	Kevin	Rick Gomez	
2004	Homeland	Mohan Bhargav	Shah Rukh Khan	
2004	Scooby-Doo 2: Monsters Unleashed	Shaggy Rogers	Matthew Lillard	
2004	Two Brothers	Sergent Van Tranh	Annop Varapanya	
2004	The Day After Tomorrow	Jeremy	Tom Rooney	
2005	The Big White	Gary	Tim Blake Nelson	
2005	Charlie and the Chocolate Factory	Mr. Bucket	Noah Taylor	
2005	Miss Congeniality 2: Armed and Fabulous	Joel	Diedrich Bader	
2005	Fun with Dick and Jane	Convenience Store Clerk	Jason Marsden	
2005	The Wedding Date	Jeffrey	Jeremy Sheffield	
2006	The Queen	Tony Blair	Michael Sheen	
2006	Never Say Goodbye	Dev Saran	Shah Rukh Khan	
2006	Click	Ted Newman	Henry Winkler	
2006	Clerks II	Dante Hicks	Brian O'Halloran	
2006	Invincible	Tommy	Kirk Acevedo	
2007	P.S. I Love You	Daniel Connelly	Harry Connick Jr.	
2007	The Kingdom	Damon Schmidt	Jeremy Piven	
2007	Zodiac	Bill Armstrong	Anthony Edwards	
2007	1408	Michael "Mike" Enslin	John Cusack	
2007	Grace Is Gone	Stanley Phillips	John Cusack	
2007	Martian Child	David Gordon	John Cusack	
2007	Let's Go India!	Kabir Khan	Shah Rukh Khan	
2007	Sweeney Todd: The Demon Barber of Fleet Street	Adolfo Pirelli	Sacha Baron Cohen	
2008	Asterix at the Olympic Games	Asterix	Clovis Cornillac	
2008	Kit Kittredge: An American Girl	Jack Kittredge	Chris O'Donnell	
2008	Flame & Citron	Aksel Winther	Peter Mygind	
2008	War, Inc.	Brand Hauser	John Cusack	
2008	Step Brothers	Sporting Goods Manager	Seth Rogen	
2008	Beverly Hills Chihuahua	Chucho	Luis Guzmán	
2008	Lecture 21	Peters	Noah Taylor	
2008	The Incredible Hulk	Samuel Sterns	Tim Blake Nelson	
2008	Welcome to the Sticks	Jean	Stéphane Freiss	
2009	2012	Jackson Curtis	John Cusack	
2009	The Hangover	Leslie Chow	Ken Jeong	
2009	The Informant!	Mark Whitacre	Matt Damon	
2009	Lucky Luke	Cavalier McStraggle	Yann Sarfati	
2010	Little Big Soldier	The Soldier	Jackie Chan	
2010	Yogi Bear	Ranger Smith	Tom Cavanagh	
2010	Alice in Wonderland	Nivens McTwisp / White Rabbit	Michael Sheen	
2010	Father of Invention	Troy Coangelo	Johnny Knoxville	
2011	Fast Five	Tej Parker	Ludacris	
2011	The Hangover Part II	Leslie Chow	Ken Jeong	
2011	Flypaper	Billy Ray 'Peanut Butter' McCloud	Tim Blake Nelson	
2011	Scream 4	Dewey Riley	David Arquette	
2012	Lawless	"Gummy" Walsh	Noah Taylor	
2012	The Raven	Edgar Allan Poe	John Cusack	
2012	The Paperboy	Hillary Van Wetter	John Cusack	
2012	The Chef	Jacky Bonnot	Michaël Youn	
2013	Chennai Express	Rahul Mithaiwala	Shah Rukh Khan	
2013	Zip & Zap and the Marble Gang	GriGrillo	Javier Cifrián	
2013	Anchorman 2: The Legend Continues	BBC News Anchor	Sacha Baron Cohen	
2013	The Frozen Ground	Robert Hansen	John Cusack	
2013	The Numbers Station	Emerson Kent	John Cusack	
2013	The Starving Games	Bob Hylox	Michael Hartson	
2013	Fast & Furious 6	Tej Parker	Ludacris	
2013	The Hangover Part III	Leslie Chow	Ken Jeong	
2013	The Hobbit: The Desolation of Smaug	Percy	Nick Blake	
2014	Neighbors	Mac Radner	Seth Rogen	
2014	The Angriest Man in Brooklyn	Aaron Altmann	Peter Dinklage	
2014	Maps to the Stars	Stafford Weiss	John Cusack	
2014	The Bag Man	Jack	John Cusack	
2014	Love & Mercy	Older Brian Wilson	John Cusack	
2014	The Prince	Sam	John Cusack	
2014	Reclaim	Benjamin	John Cusack	
2014	Predestination	Mr. Robertson	Noah Taylor	
2014	The Hobbit: The Battle of the Five Armies	Percy	Nick Blake	
2014	The Amazing Spider-Man 2	Dr. Kafka	Marton Csokas	
2015	Absolutely Anything	Neil Clarke	Simon Pegg	
2015	Furious 7	Tej Parker	Ludacris	
2015	The DUFF	Mr. Arthur	Ken Jeong	
2015	Dragon Blade	Lucius	John Cusack	
2015	The Hateful Eight	Chris Mannix	Walton Goggins	
2015	American Ultra	Laugher	Walton Goggins	
2016	Alice Through the Looking Glass	Nivens McTwisp / White Rabbit	Michael Sheen	
2016	Passengers	Arthur	Michael Sheen	
2016	Norman	Philip Cohen	Michael Sheen	
2016	Neighbors 2: Sorority Rising	Mac Radner	Seth Rogen	
2016	Cell	Clayton "Clay" Riddell	John Cusack	
2016	Ride Along 2	A.J. Jenkins	Ken Jeong	
2017	Valerian and the City of a Thousand Planets	Jolly the Pimp	Ethan Hawke	
2017	Arsenal	Sal	John Cusack	
2017	Singularity	Elias VanDorne	John Cusack	
2017	Blood Money	Miller	John Cusack	
2017	The Fate of the Furious	Tej Parker	Ludacris	
2018	Crazy Rich Asians	Goh Wye Mun	Ken Jeong	
2018	Goosebumps 2: Haunted Halloween	Mr. Chu	Ken Jeong	
2018	Distorted	Vernon Sarsfield	John Cusack	
2018	Super Troopers 2	Carl Foster	Paul Soter	
2018	Skyscraper	Mr. Pierce	Noah Taylor	
2018	Saving Flora	Henry	David Arquette	
2018	Solo: A Star Wars Story	Rio Durant	Jon Favreau	
2019	Angel Has Fallen	Vice President Martin Kirby	Tim Blake Nelson	
2019	Lady and the Tramp	Doctor	Ken Jeong	
2019	Vivarium	Martin	Jonathan Aris	
2019	Dora and the Lost City of Gold	Alejandro Gutierrez	Eugenio Derbez	
2019	The Three Exclamation Marks	Robert Wilhelms	Jürgen Vogel	
2020	Just Another Christmas	Jorge	Leandro Hassum	
2021	Tom & Jerry	Chef Jackie	Ken Jeong	
2021	Boss Level	Chef Jake	Ken Jeong	
2021	Zone 414	Joseph Veidt	Jonathan Aris	
2021	F9: The Fast Saga	Tej Parker	Ludacris	
2021	Coming 2 America	Semmi / Reverend Brown / Morris	Arsenio Hall	
2021	Naked Singularity	Angus	Tim Blake Nelson	
2022	Morbius	Al Rodriguez	Al Madrigal	
2022	Scream	Dewey Riley	David Arquette	
2022	What's Love Got to Do with It?	Mo	Asim Chaudhry	
2022	Blasted	Pelle	Eirik Hallert	
2023	Fast X	Tej Parker	Ludacris	
2023	Haunted Mansion	Vic	Dan Levy	
2023	Stroke of Luck	Gilles	Bruno Gouery	
2024	Gladiator II	Quaestor	Richard McCabe	
2026	Scream 7	Dewey Riley	David Arquette	

==== Television (Animation, Italian dub) ====
Year	Title	Role(s)	Notes	Ref
1984	Scooby-Doo, Where Are You!	Fred Jones	Main cast (2nd edition)	
1991–1992	Darkwing Duck	Quackerjack	Recurring role	
1996	Animaniacs	Daffy Duck	1 episode	
1996	Animaniacs	Ned Flat	1 episode	
1996	Animaniacs	Howie Tern	1 episode	
1996	Fat Albert and the Cosby Kids	"Old Weird" Harold Simmons	Main cast	
1997	Freakazoid!	Lord Bravery	4 episodes	
1999	Mumble Bumble	Greens the Frog	Main cast	
2000–2004	Courage the Cowardly Dog	Courage	Main cast	
2004–2006	Sonic X	Knuckles	Main cast	
2004–2006	Watch My Chops	Corneil	Main cast	
2004–2008	What's New, Scooby-Doo?	Shaggy Rogers	Main cast	
2005	MegaMan NT Warrior	Skullman	Recurring role	
2005–2012	The Fairly OddParents	Mark Chang	Recurring role (season 8)	
2005–2012	The Fairly OddParents	Norm the Genie	2 episodes	
2005–present	The Simpsons	Sideshow Mel	Recurring role (season 15+)	
2005–present	The Simpsons	Professor Frink	Recurring role (season 33+)	
2005–present	The Simpsons	Luigi Risotto	Recurring role (season 34+)	
2005–present	The Simpsons	Various characters	Recurring role	
2007–2008	Shaggy & Scooby-Doo Get a Clue!	Shaggy Rogers	Main cast	
2009	Stuart Little: The Animated Series	Stuart Little	Main cast	
2009–2013	The Penguins of Madagascar	King Julien XIII	Main cast	
2010–present	Futurama	Walt	Recurring role (season 6+)	
2010–present	Futurama	Various characters	Recurring role	
2011–2013	Scooby-Doo! Mystery Incorporated	Shaggy Rogers	Main cast	
2012	Scooby-Doo! Spooky Games	Shaggy Rogers	TV special	
2012	Scooby-Doo! Haunted Holidays	Shaggy Rogers	TV special	
2013	Scooby-Doo! and the Spooky Scarecrow	Shaggy Rogers	TV special	
2013	Scooby-Doo! Mecha Mutt Menace	Shaggy Rogers	TV special	
2014	Scooby-Doo! Ghastly Goals	Shaggy Rogers	TV special	
2015	Scooby-Doo! and the Beach Beastie	Shaggy Rogers	TV special	
2015	Lego Scooby-Doo! Knight Time Terror	Shaggy Rogers	TV film	
2015–2017	Sonic Boom	Knuckles	Main cast	
2015–2018	Be Cool, Scooby-Doo!	Shaggy Rogers	Main cast	
2016–present	Robot Chicken	Various characters	Main cast	
2017	DuckTales	Quackerjack	1 episode	
2017–2018	Big Hero 6: The Series	Robert "Obake" Aken	Recurring role	
2019	Sadie Sparks	Cornelius	Recurring role	
2019–2021	Scooby-Doo and Guess Who?	Shaggy Rogers	Main cast	
2024–present	Hazbin Hotel	Vox	Recurring role	
2025	Panty & Stocking with Garterbelt	Garterbelt	Main cast	

==== Television (Live action, Italian dub) ====
Year	Title	Role(s)	Notes	Original actor	Ref
1985–1990	Whiz Kids	Richie Adler	Main cast	Matthew Labyorteaux	
1990–2000	Beverly Hills, 90210	Steve Sanders	Main cast	Ian Ziering	
1995–2005	JAG	Bud Roberts	Main cast	Patrick Labyorteaux	
2002	It's a Very Merry Muppet Christmas Movie	Luc Fromage	TV film	Matthew Lillard	
2002–2009	Without a Trace	Martin Fitzgerald	Main cast	Eric Close	
2004–2009	Stargate Atlantis	Dr. Radek Zelenka	Recurring role	David Nykl	
2005–2007	The War at Home	David "Dave" Gold	Main cast	Michael Rapaport	
2009–2012	CSI: Miami	Walter Simmons	Main cast (seasons 8–10)	Omar Benson Miller	
2010–2017	30 Rock	Tracy Jordan	Main cast (seasons 4–7)	Tracy Morgan	
2011	CHAOS	Michael Dorset	Main cast	Eric Close	
2013–2014	Game of Thrones	Locke	8 episodes	Noah Taylor	
2014–2016	The Musketeers	Louis XIII	Main cast	Ryan Gage	
2016–2018	The Walking Dead	Simon	13 episodes	Steven Ogg	
2018–2019	Deep State	Nathan Miller	Main cast	Walton Goggins	
2019–2020	After Life	Julian Kane	Main cast (season 1)	Tim Plester	

==== Video games (Italian dub) ====
Year	Title	Role(s)	Ref
2007	The Simpsons Game	Sideshow Mel	
2009	Up	Dug	
2011	Kinect: Disneyland Adventures	White Rabbit	
2012	DreamWorks Madagascar 3: The Video Game	King Julien XIII	
2022	MultiVersus	Shaggy Rogers	
