= Dubbing Brothers International Italia =

Dubbing Brothers
- Industry: Dubbing
- Headquarters: Rome, Italy
- Owner: Dubbing Brothers
- Parent: Dubbing Brothers
- Website: Dubbing Brothers

Dubbing Brothers International Italia is an Italian dubbing studio based in Rome. It is the Italian division of the Saint-Denis based dubbing studio Dubbing Brothers.

The studio produces Italian language dubbed versions of numerous movies and TV shows. Numerous voice actors work at the studio.

== Clients ==
- Warner Bros.
- Disney Character Voices International
- Mediaset
- Nickelodeon

== Content ==
- Inside Out
- The Hangover
- The Hangover Part II
- Over the Hedge
- Castle (TV series)
- No Ordinary Family
- Toy Story 3
- Taken (TV miniseries)
- Legend of the Seeker
- Tinker Bell
- Tinker Bell and the Lost Treasure
- Tinker Bell and the Great Fairy Rescue
- The Book of Masters
- The Boys Are Back
- Star Wars: The Clone Wars (film)
- The Losers
- The Fourth Kind
- Time Squad
- Cars 2
- Bolt
- Tales from Earthsea
- Sheep in the Big City
- Shrek the Third
- Shrek Forever After
- Duck Dodgers
- College Road Trip
- Up
- Morning Light
- The Princess and the Frog
- Alice in Wonderland
- Make It or Break It
- Cougar Town
- Detroit 1-8-7
- Old Dogs
- The Inside
- Ella Enchanted
- The War at Home (TV series)
- Earth
- The Sorcerer's Apprentice
- Phineas and Ferb (Season 1)
- The Boss of It All
- 10 Things I Hate About You (TV series)
- The Red Shoes
- Prince of Persia: The Sands of Time
- Secretariat
- Black Swan
- Totò Sapore e la magica storia della pizza
- The Last Song
- Ice Age
- Starstruck
- Balls of Fury
- Wizards of Waverly Place
- Psych
- The Suite Life of Zack & Cody
- The Suite Life on Deck
- Princess Protection Program
- Samurai Girl
- ChalkZone
- Miraculous: Tales of Ladybug & Cat Noir

== Dubbers ==
- Antonella Baldini
- Manuel Meli
- Mattia Nissolino
- Perla Liberatori
- Davide Garbolino
- Luca Dal Fabbro
- Alessandro Quarta
- Davide Perino
- Nanni Baldini
- Massimo Bitossi
- Claudia Razzi
- Domitilla D'Amico
- Gemma Donati
- Letizia Ciampa
- Paolo Vivio
- Monica Ward
- Leonardo Graziano
- Davide Albano
- Pino Insegno
- Davide Lepore
- Ilaria Latini
- Tonino Accolla
- Laura Boccanera
- Francesco Pezzulli
- Massimo Corvo
- Fabrizio Manfredi
- Stefano Crescentini
- Ilaria Giorgino
- Gianluca Crisafi
- Valentina Favazza
- Elena Perino
- Francesca Manicone
- Daniele Raffaeli
- Luigi Scribani
- Eva Padoan
- Emanuela Damasio
- Paolo De Santis
- Eugenio Marinelli
- Roberto Stocchi
- Alessandra Korompay
- Antonella Rinaldi
- Roberta De Roberto
- Angelica Bolognesi
- Doriana Chierici
- Stefano De Filippis
- Edoardo Siravo
- Pinella Dragani
- Angiola Baggi
- Elio Zamuto
- Gaetano Varcasia
- Francesco Prando
- Giò Giò Rapattoni
- Valentina Mari
- Arturo Valli
- Mino Caprio
- Renato Cecchetto
- Emiliano Coltorti
- Marco Baroni
- Laura Romano
- Christian Iansante
- Andrea Mete
- Benedetta Gravina
- Laura Amadei
- Renzo Stacchi
- Roberta Paladini
- Fabrizio Vidale
- Roberto Draghetti
- Edoardo Stoppacciaro
- Marco Vivio
- Alessio Puccio
- Ilaria Giorgino
- Rachele Paolelli
- Oreste Baldini
- Dario De Grassi
- Joy Saltarelli
- Stefania Romagnoli
- Roberto Certomà
- Stefano Onofri
- Fabio Valenzi
- Maurizio Fiorentini
- Luigi Morville
- Chiara Gioncardi
- Lorenza Biella
- Alessandro Rossi
- Paila Pavese
- Barbara De Bortoli
- Stella Musy
- Luca Ward
- Mauro Gravina
- Agnese Marteddu
- Laura Cosenza
- Federica De Bortoli
- Luca Bizzarri
- Danilo De Girolamo
- Paolo Kessisoglu
- Giulia Tarquini
- Monica Vulcano
- Raoul Bova
- Anna Rita Pasanisi
- Alessia Amendola
- Graziella Polesinanti
- Emanuela Rossi
- Pieraldo Ferrante
- Ambrogio Colombo
- Roberta Greganti
- Gabriele Patriarca
- Alex Polidori
- Massimiliano Manfredi
- Luca Biagini
- Angelo Maggi
- Aurora Cancian
- Georgia Lepore
- Sasha De Toni
- Alessandro Ward
- Simone D'Andrea
- Vladimiro Conti
- Fabrizio De Flaviis
- Saverio Indrio
- Andrea Lavagnino
- Jacopo Castagna
- Gabriele Lopez
- Niseem Onorato
- Franco Mannella
- David Chevalier
- Sandro Pellegrini
- Alessia Amendola
- Chiara Colizzi
- Laura Chiatti
- Alex Polidori
- Gianluca Machelli
- Fabrizio Pucci
- Massimiliano Alto
- Pino Ammendola
- Emiliano Coltorti
- Giampaolo Morelli
- Alessio De Filippis
- Franco Mannella
- Giancarlo Giannini
- Mattia Ward
- Monica Vulcano
- Francesca Guadagno
- Micaela Incitti
- Simone Veltroni
- Benedetta Ponticelli
- Gilberta Crispino
- Paolo Marchese
- Emiliano Reggente
- Lorenzo D'Agata
- Lorenzo De Angelis
- Alessio Cigliano
- Barbara Pitotti
- Corrado Conforti
- Sara Labidi
- Simone Crisari
- Emanuela D'Amico
- Ughetta D'Onorascenzo
- Eleonora Reti
- Federico Bebi
- Pietro Ubaldi
- Vittorio Di Prima
- Alessandra Cassioli
- Melina Martello
- Francesco De Francesco
- and others

== See also ==
- Dubbing Brothers Germany
- Dubbing Brothers Belgium
