= Baldi (surname) =

Baldi is an Italian surname. Notable people with the surname include:

- Bernardino Baldi (1533–1617), Italian mathematician and writer
- Camillo Baldi (bishop) (died 1650), Roman Catholic Bishop of Nicotera
- Domenico Di Cecco di Baldi (active mid-15th century), Italian painter
- Pier Maria Baldi (1630–1686), Italian painter and architect
- Pietro Del Riccio Baldi (1475–1507), also known as Crinitus, Florentine humanist scholar and poet, disciple of Poliziano
- Aleandro Baldi (born 1959), Italian singer-songwriter and composer
- Antonio Baldi (painter) (c. 1692–1768), Italian painter and engraver
- Antonio Baldi (singer) (fl 1714–35), Italian opera singer and castrato
- Antonio Pompa-Baldi (born 1974), Italian-American pianist.
- Baldo Baldi (1888–1961), Italian fencer
- Camillo Baldi (1550–1637), Italian doctor, philosopher and social commentator from Bologna
- Daniel Baldi (born 1981), Uruguayan football player and writer
- Dario Baldi (born 1976), Italian film director, documentarian and writer
- Edgardo Baldi (1899–1951), Italian limnologist
- Edgardo Baldi (1944–2016), former Uruguayan football player and manager
- Ferdinando Baldi (1927–2007), Italian film director, producer and screenwriter
- Filippo Baldi Rossi (born 1991), Italian professional basketball player
- Gastone Baldi (1901–1971), Italian footballer who played as a midfielder
- Gian Vittorio Baldi (1930–2015), Italian film director, producer and screenwriter
- João José Baldi (1780–1816), pianist at the court of the Marquis of Alorna and opera conductor in Leiria
- Lazzaro Baldi (c. 1624–1703), Italian painter from Pistoia
- Marcello Baldi (1923–2008), Italian film director and screenwriter
- Mauro Baldi (born 1954), Italian former Formula One driver
- Michele Baldi (born 1972), Italian footballer
- Paulo Baldi, American percussionist with the band CAKE
- Philip Baldi, American linguist and classical scholar
- Pierre Baldi, Italian-born computer scientist
- Rachele Baldi (born 1994), Italian footballer
- Ubaldesco Baldi (1944–1991), Italian sport shooter
- Valentino Baldi (1774–1816), Italian painter, mainly of quadratura and ornamentation in fresco and tempera

Notable people with the given name include

- Baldi Niederkorfer (or Balthasar Niederkofler; 1906–1989), Austrian cross country skier

== See also ==
- Baldini
- Baldi's Basics in Education and Learning
