= Baldi =

Baldi may refer to:

- Baldi (surname)
- Baldi (radio), a series of BBC radio detective dramas.
- Baldi's Basics in Education and Learning, a 2018 educational horror video game.
