= Davide Lepore =

Italian voice actor and dubbing director (born 1968)

- Born: 7 August 1968 (age 58); Rome, Italy
- Occupation: Voice actor
- Relatives: Georgia Lepore (sister)

Davide Lepore (born 7 August 1968, in Rome) is an Italian voice actor and dubbing director. He contributes to voicing characters in anime, cartoons, movies, and more content.

Lepore is well known for providing the voice of the character Chris Griffin in the Italian-language version of the popular animated sitcom Family Guy. He is also well known for providing the voice of Milhouse Van Houten in the Italian-language version of The Simpsons.

He works at Dubbing Brothers, LaBibi.it, and other dubbing studios in Italy.

== Voice work ==
- Duman in Winx Club (season 4+)

=== Animation dubbing ===
- Chris Griffin, Seth Green, and Blue-Haired Lawyer in Family Guy
- Milhouse Van Houten (Season 3-present), Professor Frink (Seasons 5-12), and Kang in The Simpsons
- Milhouse Van Houten in The Simpsons Movie
- Francis (Second voice) and Juandissimo Magnifico in The Fairly OddParents
- Numbah Two/Hoagie Gilligan (Second voice) in Codename: Kids Next Door
- Tōru Kazama in Crayon Shin-chan (First and second dubs)
- Benny HaHa in Duel Masters
- Rekkit in Rekkit Rabbit
- Cletus Kasady/Carnage in Spider-Man: The Animated Series
- Sakai Jefferson Kōji in Hungry Heart: Wild Striker
- Jesse Greenwood in Free Willy
- Gallaxhar in Monsters vs. Aliens
- Munk in Happily N'Ever After 2: Snow White Another Bite @ the Apple
- Clifford in Clifford the Big Red Dog (TV series)
- Jimmy Gourd in VeggieTales
- Wakko Warner in Animaniacs
- Viral in Gurren Lagann
- Oobi in Oobi
- Bass in MegaMan NT Warrior
- Henry in Tomodachi Life: The TV Series
- Percy the Small Engine in Thomas and the Magic Railroad
- Gerald in Harvey Girls Forever!
- Bryson Jones in Sarah Lee Jones (since 2000)
- Charles in Frosty Returns
- Paco in Maya & Miguel
- Benny the Bat in Bear in the Big Blue House
- Screwy in Rolie Polie Olie
- Dan in LeapFrog
- Harry the Dog in Stanley
- Pico in TeachTown
- Krillin in Dragon Ball Z: Cooler's Revenge (First dub)
- Krillin in Dragon Ball Z: Return of Cooler (First dub)
- Makoto Kurumizawa in Boys Be...
- Yūsaku Hino in Kimagure Orange Road (Second dub)
- Eco in Lunar Jim
- Kintaro Oe in Golden Boy
- Bud Mint in KO Beast
- Penny in The Rescuers
- Gomamon in Digimon Adventure
- Gomamon in Digimon Adventure 02
- Sergeant Stripes and Inspector Hector in Sergeant Stripes
- Linda Belcher in Bob's Burgers
- Hanappe Bazooka in Hanappe Bazooka

=== Live action shows and movies ===
- Paul Weston in The Hard Easy
- Vinnie Patterson in Home and Away
- Cooper Harris in EuroTrip
- Marcus in Hatchet
- Eric Hanson (Second voice) in Malcolm in the Middle
- Miles Novacek in Nick Freno: Licensed Teacher
- Roberto "Rober" Arenales in Un Paso Adelante
- Miles Novacek in Nick Freno: Licensed Teacher
- Chris Blake in Sea Patrol (Second dub)
- Malcolm Wyatt in Ally McBeal
- Jason Tiner in JAG
- Rob Norris in Catastrophe
- Danny Delgado/Black Bison Ranger in Power Rangers Wild Force
- Jeremy Peters in Boston Public
- Lachy in The Wiggles
- Randall Reese in The Nine (TV series)
- Alexei in Hostel (2005 film)
- Bobby Calzone in Drowning Mona
- Joe in Team America: World Police
- Leo Koenig in Funny People
- Rubin in Road Trip
- Denis Domaschke in Good Bye, Lenin!

== See also ==
- Non-English versions of The Simpsons
