= Luca Dal Fabbro =

Italian actor and voice actor (born 1951)

- Born: 1 January 1951 (age 75); Rome, Italy
- Occupations: Actor; voice actor; adapter; dubbing director; theatre director
- Years active: 1969–present
- Children: 1
- Parents: Nino Dal Fabbro (father); Vanna Polverosi (mother)

Luca Dal Fabbro (born 1 January 1951) is an Italian actor and voice actor.

== Biography ==
Born in Rome, Dal Fabbro is the son of actors Nino Dal Fabbro and Vanna Polverosi. As a theatre actor, he has worked with directors such as Dacia Maraini, Vittorio Gassman, Giorgio Albertazzi and Andrzej Wajda, even directing some plays himself. He also acted in some Italian TV shows and had a role in the 1975 miniseries Ritratto di donna velata as well as Mario Monicelli's film Caro Michele the following year.

Dal Fabbro contributes to voicing characters in cartoons, TV commercials, and more content, also providing voice acting work for the radio industry. He is well known for serving as the primary Italian-dubbed voice of Steve Buscemi. He has also dubbed other actors such as William H. Macy, Bruno Kirby, Joe Pantoliano and others. His character dubbing roles include Ephialtes (portrayed by Andrew Tiernan) in 300 and the 2014 sequel, as well as Steve Brady (portrayed by David Eigenberg) in seasons 2 and 3 of Sex and the City and the subsequent movies.

In his animated dubbing roles, Dal Fabbro has provided the voice of the character Dr. Heinz Doofenshmirtz in the Italian-language version of the animated series Phineas and Ferb and since 2002, he has voiced Piglet in the Italian dub of the Winnie the Pooh franchise. Some of his other animated roles include Wayne in the Hotel Transylvania franchise, Randall Boggs in Monsters University (replacing the late Daniele Formica, who voiced him in the first film) and Bing Bong in Inside Out.

In the English-dubbed version of Matteo Garrone's 2019 film, Pinocchio, Dal Fabbro performed the voices of all three characters portrayed by Davide Marotta: the Talking Cricket, the Pantalone marionette, and one of the rabbits.

Dal Fabbro has one son, Paolo, who also works as a voice actor. He has worked for Dubbing Brothers, CDC Sefit Group, LaBibi.it and other dubbing studios in Italy.

== Filmography ==
=== Cinema ===
| Year | Title | Role | Notes |
|---|---|---|---|
| 1976 | Caro Michele | Ray | Comedy |
| 2006 | Magic Sport | Zibba (voice) | Animated film |
| 2012 | Pinocchio | The First Fisherman (voice) | Animated film |
| 2015 | Acid Space | Mackero (voice) | Animated film |
| 2020 | Trash - La leggenda della piramide magica | Smug (voice) | Animated film |
| 2020 | La verità su La dolce vita | Federico Fellini (voice) | Documentary |
| 2020 | All'ombra del microfono | Himself | Documentary |

=== Television ===
| Year | Title | Role | Notes |
|---|---|---|---|
| 1974 | Quaranta giorni di libertà | Andrea | TV miniseries |
| 1975 | Ritratto di donna velata | Sergio’s friend | TV miniseries |
| 1976 | Extra | Calvin Parker | TV miniseries |
| 1976 | Patatine di contorno | Smiler Washington | TV play |
| 1977 | Edipo re | Choir | TV play |
| 1979 | Con gli occhi dell'occidente | Kostia | TV miniseries |
| 1981 | I giochi del diavolo | The Friend | TV miniseries |
| 1981 | George Sand | Maurice | TV miniseries |
| 1981 | La professione della signora Warren | Frank Gardner | TV play |
| 1984 | L'affare Danton | Desmoulins | TV play |
| 1995 | Voci notturne | Giacomo Fiorenza / Ronnie McCormick (voice) | TV series |

=== Dubbing ===
==== Films (Live action, English dub) ====
| Year | Title | Role(s) | Original actor | Ref |
|---|---|---|---|---|
| 2019 | Pinocchio | Talking Cricket | Davide Marotta | |
| 2019 | Pinocchio | Pantalone marionette | Davide Marotta | |
| 2019 | Pinocchio | Rabbit | Davide Marotta | |

==== Films (Animation, Italian dub) ====
| Year | Title | Role(s) | Ref |
|---|---|---|---|
| 1990 | The Rescuers Down Under | Frank | |
| 1995 | Toy Story | Lenny | |
| 1997 | Casper: A Spirited Beginning | Stretch | |
| 1998 | Casper Meets Wendy | Stinkie | |
| 1999 | Lupin III: The Columbus Files | Nazaroff | |
| 2002 | A Very Merry Pooh Year | Piglet | |
| 2002 | Cinderella II: Dreams Come True | Jaq | |
| 2003 | Piglet's Big Movie | Piglet | |
| 2003 | Finding Nemo | Chum | |
| 2004 | Seasons of Giving | Piglet (2004 redub) | |
| 2004 | Home on the Range | The Willie Brothers | |
| 2004 | Springtime with Roo | Piglet | |
| 2005 | Valiant | Jacques | |
| 2005 | Pooh's Heffalump Movie | Piglet | |
| 2005 | Pooh's Heffalump Halloween Movie | Piglet | |
| 2006 | Happily N'Ever After | Munk | |
| 2007 | The Three Robbers | Coachman | |
| 2007 | Cinderella III: A Twist in Time | Jaq | |
| 2007 | Donkey Xote | Newspaper seller | |
| 2008 | Dragonlance: Dragons of Autumn Twilight | Flint Fireforge | |
| 2008 | Futurama: Bender's Game | Roberto | |
| 2008 | Igor | Scamper | |
| 2008 | Star Wars: The Clone Wars | Ziro the Hutt | |
| 2009 | A Town Called Panic | Indian | |
| 2010 | The Legend of Secret Pass | Chuck | |
| 2011 | Winnie the Pooh | Piglet | |
| 2012 | Hotel Transylvania | Wayne | |
| 2012 | The Pirates! In an Adventure with Scientists! | Scarlett Morgan | |
| 2013 | Monsters University | Randall Boggs | |
| 2013 | Khumba | Skalk | |
| 2015 | Inside Out | Bing Bong | |
| 2015 | Hotel Transylvania 2 | Wayne | |
| 2015 | Huevos: Little Rooster's Egg-cellent Adventure | Confi | |
| 2015 | Animal Kingdom: Let's Go Ape | Vladimir | |
| 2015 | Ooops! Noah Is Gone... | Chimpanzee | |
| 2016 | Ratchet & Clank | Doctor Nefarious | |
| 2016 | Sausage Party | Sammy Bagel Jr. | |
| 2017 | The Boss Baby | Francis E. Francis | |
| 2018 | Christopher Robin | Piglet | |
| 2018 | Hotel Transylvania 3: Summer Vacation | Wayne | |
| 2018 | Early Man | Brian | |
| 2018 | The Princess and the Dragon | Shum Arri | |
| 2018 | The Happytime Murders | Larry "Shenanigans" Phillips | |
| 2018 | Dilili in Paris | Male Master affiliate | |
| 2022 | Hotel Transylvania: Transformania | Wayne | |
| 2024 | The Day the Earth Blew Up: A Looney Tunes Movie | The Invader | |

==== Films (Live action, Italian dub) ====
| Year | Title | Role(s) | Original actor | Ref |
|---|---|---|---|---|
| 1973 | American Graffiti | Steve Bolander | Ron Howard | |
| 1978 | Animal House | Kent "Flounder" Dorfman | Stephen Furst | |
| 1981 | Halloween II | Jimmy | Lance Guest | |
| 1984 | Hot Dog…The Movie | "Squirrel" Murphy | Frank Koppala | |
| 1985 | To Live and Die in L.A. | Carl Cody | John Turturro | |
| 1985 | Kiss of the Spider Woman | Valentin Arregui | Raul Julia | |
| 1986 | Platoon | Lerner | Johnny Depp | |
| 1987 | Good Morning, Vietnam | Steven Hauk | Bruno Kirby | |
| 1987 | Project X | Sergeant Krieger | Jonathan Stark | |
| 1987 | Maid to Order | Dude | Leland Crooke | |
| 1988 | Mississippi Burning | Clinton Pell | Brad Dourif | |
| 1988 | The Dead Pool | Harlan Rook | David Hunt | |
| 1989 | Pet Sematary | Victor Pascow | Brad Greenquist | |
| 1989 | When Harry Met Sally... | Jess | Bruno Kirby | |
| 1989 | The Abyss | Ensign Monk | Adam Nelson | |
| 1989 | Romero | Father Manuel Morantes | Tony Plana | |
| 1990 | Miller's Crossing | Bernie Bernbaum | John Turturro | |
| 1990 | Darkman | Sam "Smiley" Rogers | Dan Bell | |
| 1990 | Men at Work | Mario | John Lavachielli | |
| 1991 | City Slickers | Ed Furillo | Bruno Kirby | |
| 1991 | Dead Again | Pete Dugan | Wayne Knight | |
| 1991 | Career Opportunities | Nestor Pyle | Dermot Mulroney | |
| 1991 | Out for Justice | Richie Madano | William Forsythe | |
| 1991 | F/X2 | Mike Brandon | Tom Mason | |
| 1992 | Reservoir Dogs | Mr. Pink | Steve Buscemi | |
| 1992 | The Naked Truth | Frank II | Kevin Schon | |
| 1992 | The Naked Truth | Mirabelle | Kevin Schon | |
| 1992 | Article 99 | Dr. Rudy Bobrick | John C. McGinley | |
| 1993 | Me and the Kid | Roy Walls | Joe Pantoliano | |
| 1993 | Addams Family Values | Gary Granger | Peter MacNicol | |
| 1993 | Judgment Night | Ray Cochran | Jeremy Piven | |
| 1993 | Hot Shots! Part Deux | Rabinowitz | Ryan Stiles | |
| 1993 | Blink | Ryan Pierce | Peter Friedman | |
| 1994 | I Love Trouble | Rick Medwick | Charles Martin Smith | |
| 1994 | Natural Born Killers | Owen Traft | Arliss Howard | |
| 1994 | The Mask | Sweet Eddy | Denis Forest | |
| 1994 | Angie | Dr. Gould | Ray Xifo | |
| 1995 | Crimson Tide | Roy Zimmer | Matt Craven | |
| 1995 | Things to Do in Denver When You're Dead | Mr. Shhh | Steve Buscemi | |
| 1995 | Steal Big Steal Little | Eddie Agopian | Joe Pantoliano | |
| 1995 | Perfect Alibi | Franklin Dupard | Charles Martin Smith | |
| 1995 | Casper | Stretch | Joe Nipote | |
| 1995 | I.D. | Charlie | Philip Glenister | |
| 1995 | To Wong Foo, Thanks for Everything! Julie Newmar | Sheriff Dollard | Chris Penn | |
| 1996 | Fargo | Carl Showalter | Steve Buscemi | |
| 1996 | Trees Lounge | Tommy Basilio | Steve Buscemi | |
| 1996 | Escape from L.A. | Eddie | Steve Buscemi | |
| 1996 | The Rock | Captain Frye | Gregory Sporleder | |
| 1997 | Lady Emanuelle | Marc | Antonio Zequila | |
| 1997 | Con Air | Garland Greene | Steve Buscemi | |
| 1998 | The Truman Show | Simeon | Paul Giamatti | |
| 1998 | The Wedding Singer | David Veltri | Steve Buscemi | |
| 1998 | The Big Lebowski | Donny Kerabatsos | Steve Buscemi | |
| 1998 | Armageddon | Rockhound | Steve Buscemi | |
| 1998 | Senseless | Dr. Thomas Wheedon | Brad Dourif | |
| 1998 | Mercury Rising | Leo Pedranski | Bodhi Elfman | |
| 1998 | The Jungle Book: Mowgli's Story | Tabaqui | Stephen Tobolowsky | |
| 1999 | Man on the Moon | Bob Zmuda / Tony Clifton | Paul Giamatti | |
| 2000 | Ready to Rumble | Titus Sinclair | Joe Pantoliano | |
| 2000 | The Replacements | Nigel Gruff | Rhys Ifans | |
| 2000 | Relative Values | Peter Ingleton | Colin Firth | |
| 2001 | Ghost World | Seymour | Steve Buscemi | |
| 2001 | The Grey Zone | "Hesch" Abramowics | Steve Buscemi | |
| 2001 | Mulholland Drive | The Cowboy | Monty Montgomery | |
| 2001 | K-PAX | Howie | David Patrick Kelly | |
| 2001 | Ichi the Killer | Jijii | Shinya Tsukamoto | |
| 2002 | Spy Kids 2: The Island of Lost Dreams | Romero | Steve Buscemi | |
| 2003 | Good Boy! | Mr. Baker | Kevin Nealon | |
| 2003 | Spy Kids 3-D: Game Over | Romero | Steve Buscemi | |
| 2003 | Coffee and Cigarettes | Danny | Steve Buscemi | |
| 2004 | Cellular | Bob Mooney | William H. Macy | |
| 2004 | A Very Long Engagement | Sylvain | Dominique Pinon | |
| 2004 | Hypnos | Dr. Zabala | Carlos Lasarte | |
| 2005 | The Brothers Grimm | Hidlick | Mackenzie Crook | |
| 2005 | The Island | James McCord | Steve Buscemi | |
| 2005 | Romance & Cigarettes | Angelo | Steve Buscemi | |
| 2005 | Assault on Precinct 13 | Kevin Capra | Matt Craven | |
| 2006 | 300 | Ephialtes | Andrew Tiernan | |
| 2006 | Comedy of Power | Jean-Baptiste Holéo | Philippe Duclos | |
| 2006 | Alatriste | Emilio Bocanegra | Blanca Portillo | |
| 2007 | I Think I Love My Wife | George | Steve Buscemi | |
| 2007 | Interview | Pierre Peders | Steve Buscemi | |
| 2007 | He Was a Quiet Man | Gene Shelby | William H. Macy | |
| 2007 | The Comebacks | Cowboy | Bradley Cooper | |
| 2008 | Sex and the City | Steve Brady | David Eigenberg | |
| 2008 | Dante 01 | César | Dominique Pinon | |
| 2009 | The Messenger | Dale Martin | Steve Buscemi | |
| 2009 | G-Force | Bucky | Steve Buscemi | |
| 2009 | Bodyguards and Assassins | Li Yutang | Wang Xueqi | |
| 2009 | Shorts | Dr. Noseworthy | William H. Macy | |
| 2009 | The Maiden Heist | George McLendon | William H. Macy | |
| 2010 | Percy Jackson & the Olympians: The Lightning Thief | Gabe Ugliano | Joe Pantoliano | |
| 2010 | Sex and the City 2 | Steve Brady | David Eigenberg | |
| 2011 | The Lincoln Lawyer | Frank Levin | William H. Macy | |
| 2011 | The Eagle | Centurion Lutorius | Denis O'Hare | |
| 2014 | The Cobbler | Jimmy | Steve Buscemi | |
| 2014 | 300: Rise of an Empire | Ephialtes | Andrew Tiernan | |
| 2014 | Cake | Leonard | William H. Macy | |
| 2014 | Rudderless | Tavern Owner / Emcee | William H. Macy | |
| 2016 | Norman | Rabbi Blumenthal | Steve Buscemi | |
| 2017 | The Death of Stalin | Nikita Khrushchev | Steve Buscemi | |
| 2017 | Lean on Pete | Del Montgomery | Steve Buscemi | |
| 2020 | Bad Boys for Life | Conrad Howard | Joe Pantoliano | |
| 2020 | The King of Staten Island | Papa | Steve Buscemi | |
| 2020 | Hubie Halloween | Walter Lambert | Steve Buscemi | |
| 2023 | Maybe I Do | Sam | William H. Macy | |
| 2023 | Vacation Friends 2 | Reese Hackford | Steve Buscemi | |
| 2023 | Love at First Sight | Val Jones | Dexter Fletcher | |
| 2023 | Oppenheimer | Warren Magnuson | Gregory Jbara | |
| 2024 | Kingdom of the Planet of the Apes | Trevathan | William H. Macy | |

==== Television (Animation, Italian dub) ====
| Year | Title | Role(s) | Notes | Ref |
|---|---|---|---|---|
| 1980–1981 | Space Battleship Yamato III | Ryuusuke Damon | Recurring role | |
| 1982 | Here Comes Garfield | Jon Arbuckle | TV special | |
| 1983 | Garfield on the Town | Jon Arbuckle | TV special | |
| 1983 | Garfield on the Town | Stray cat | TV special | |
| 1983–1984 | Hello! Sandybell | Charles | Recurring role | |
| 1983–2010 | Urusei Yatsura | Various characters | Recurring role | |
| 1985 | Garfield's Halloween Adventure | Jon Arbuckle | TV special | |
| 1986 | Garfield in Paradise | Jon Arbuckle | TV special | |
| 1987 | Garfield Goes Hollywood | Jon Arbuckle | TV special | |
| 1987 | Garfield Goes Hollywood | Herbie | TV special | |
| 1989 | Garfield's Thanksgiving | Jon Arbuckle | TV special | |
| 1989 | Garfield's Babes and Bullets | Jon Arbuckle | TV special | |
| 1989 | Garfield's Babes and Bullets | Professor O'Felix | TV special | |
| 1990 | Garfield's Feline Fantasies | Jon Arbuckle | TV special | |
| 1990 | Garfield's Feline Fantasies | French waiter | TV special | |
| 1992–1993 | TaleSpin | Wildcat | Recurring role | |
| 1993–1994 | New Dominion Tank Police | Jim E. Lovelock | Main cast | |
| 1995 | Timon & Pumbaa | Woody Woodeater III | 1 episode | |
| 1995–1999 | Doug | Roger M. Klotz | Main cast | |
| 1996 | Animaniacs | Daffy Duck | 1 episode (season 1x47) | |
| 1996 | Animaniacs | Baloney | 1 episode (season 1x61) | |
| 1996 | Animaniacs | Buddy | 1 episode (season 1x65) | |
| 2001 | Bear in the Big Blue House | Pip | Main cast | |
| 2005 | Magical Shopping Arcade Abenobashi | Ms. Aki | Recurring role | |
| 2005 | Codename: Kids Next Door | Cuppa Joe | 1 episode | |
| 2006–2009 | The Emperor's New School | Mr. Moleguaco | Recurring role | |
| 2007 | Vampiyan Kids | Robozo | Recurring role | |
| 2007–present | Phineas and Ferb | Dr. Heinz Doofenshmirtz | Main cast | |
| 2007–2008 | George of the Jungle | Witch Doctor | Recurring role | |
| 2007–2015 | My Friends Tigger & Pooh | Piglet | Main cast | |
| 2008 | Pretty Cure Splash Star | Goyan | Recurring role | |
| 2008–present | The Simpsons | Gil Gunderson | Recurring role (season 18+) | |
| 2008–present | The Simpsons | Tom Wolfe | 1 episode (season 18x06) | |
| 2008–present | The Simpsons | Notary | 1 episode (season 34x9) | |
| 2011 | Phineas and Ferb the Movie: Across the 2nd Dimension | Dr. Heinz Doofenshmirtz | TV film | |
| 2011 | Phineas and Ferb the Movie: Across the 2nd Dimension | Doofenshmirtz–2 | TV film | |
| 2011–2019 | The Amazing World of Gumball | Louie Watterson | Recurring role | |
| 2014–2021 | The Seven Deadly Sins | Cain Barzard | Recurring role | |
| 2016 | Bordertown | Ernesto Gonzalez | Main cast | |
| 2017 | Doc McStuffins | Piglet | 1 episode (season 4x15) | |
| 2019 | Mr. Magoo | Mr. Magoo | Main cast | |

==== Television (Live action, Italian dub) ====
| Year | Title | Role(s) | Notes | Original actor | Ref |
|---|---|---|---|---|---|
| 1982 | Columbo | Roy Springer | 1 episode (season 4x03) | Mark Wheeler | |
| 1984 | Leonela | Otto Mendoza | Recurring role (season 1) | Carlos Cámara Jr. | |
| 1990 | Too Young to Die? | Billy Canton | TV film | Brad Pitt | |
| 1996 | The Beast | Schuyler Graves | TV miniseries | Charles Martin Smith | |
| 1997–1998 | The Gregory Hines Show | Ben Stevenson | Main cast | Gregory Hines | |
| 2000 | Angels in the Infield | Bob Bugler | TV film | David Alan Grier | |
| 2002 | Star Trek: Deep Space Nine | Quark | Main cast (season 7) | Armin Shimerman | |
| 2002–2003 | Sex and the City | Steve Brady | Recurring role (seasons 2–3) | David Eigenberg | |
| 2005 | The Sopranos | Tony Blundetto | Recurring role (season 5) | Steve Buscemi | |
| 2006–2013 | 30 Rock | Lenny Wosniak | 6 episodes | Steve Buscemi | |
| 2008 | ER | Art Masterson | 1 episode | Steve Buscemi | |
| 2009 | Prison Break | Ralph Becker | 6 episodes (season 4) | Raphael Sbarge | |
| 2011 | American Horror Story: Murder House | Larry Harvey | Main cast | Denis O'Hare | |
| 2013–present | Chicago Fire | Christopher Herrmann | Main cast | David Eigenberg | |
| 2022 | Brooklyn Nine-Nine | Charles Boyle | Main cast (season 8) | Joe Lo Truglio | |
| 2022 | Reacher | Taylor Spivey | Recurring role (season 1) | Patrick Garrow | |
| 2022–present | Chucky | Charles Lee Ray / Chucky | Main cast | Brad Dourif | |
| 2023 | Only Murders in the Building | Jerry Blau | 1 episode (season 3x06) | Peter Bartlett | |

==== Video games (Italian dub) ====
| Year | Title | Role(s) | Ref |
|---|---|---|---|
| 2001 | Monsters, Inc. Scream Team | Randall Boggs | |
| 2003 | Finding Nemo | Chum | |
| 2009 | Phineas and Ferb: The Video Game | Dr. Heinz Doofenshmirtz | |
| 2010 | Fallout: New Vegas | James Hsu | |
| 2011 | Phineas and Ferb: Across the 2nd Dimension | Dr. Heinz Doofenshmirtz | |
| 2011 | Phineas and Ferb: Across the 2nd Dimension | Doofenshmirtz–2 | |
| 2012 | Epic Mickey 2: The Power of Two | Abe | |
| 2013 | Disney Infinity | Randall Boggs | |
| 2019 | Death Stranding | Deadman | |
| 2023 | Star Wars Jedi: Survivor | Senator Daho Sejan | |
| 2025 | Death Stranding 2: On the Beach | Deadman | |

== Work as a dubbing director ==
- Bear in the Big Blue House
- Hero: 108
- Buzz Lightyear of Star Command
- The Chamber
- Y Tu Mamá También
- Lampião e Maria Bonita (1st dub)
- Canterbury's Law
- Don't Blame Me
- The Wedding Singer
- Best Men
- Happily N'Ever After
- Walk the Line
- Reunion
- Patch Adams
- Waking Life
- Harriet the Spy
- Haunted
- North Country
- The Last of the Mohicans
- Kangaroo Jack
- Dangerous Game
- ChalkZone
