= Manuel Meli =

Italian voice actor

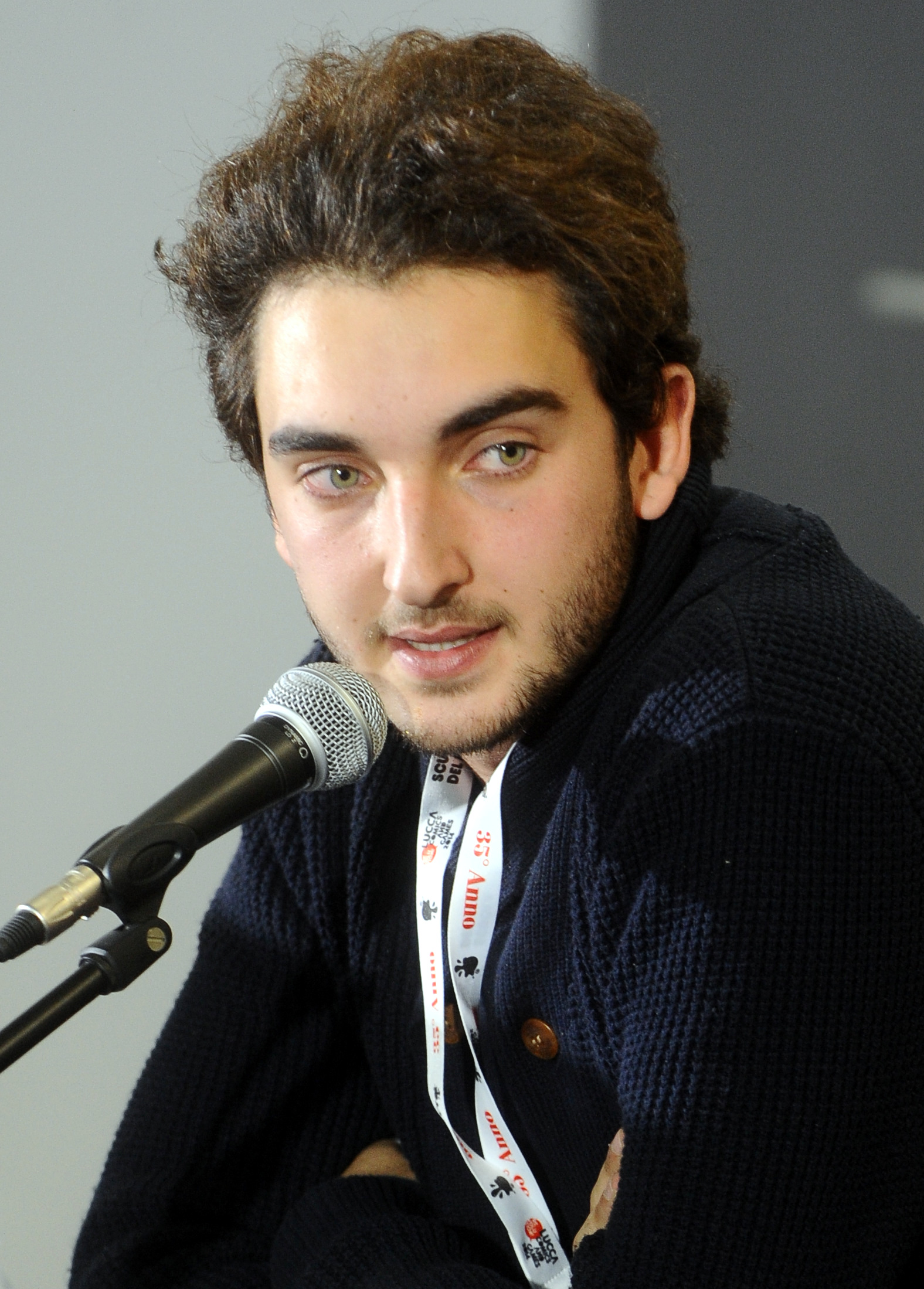
- Meli in 2014
- Born: 25 March 1995 (age 31); Rome, Italy
- Occupation: Voice actor
- Years active: 2002–present
- Website: ManuelMeli.it

Manuel Meli (born 25 March 1995) is an Italian voice actor. Meli contributes to voicing characters in cartoons, anime, movies, and sitcoms.

Meli was born in Rome. He is known for providing the voice of Phineas Flynn in the Italian-language version of the Disney Channel original animated series Phineas and Ferb. He is also well known for voicing Cody Martin in the Italian-language versions of The Suite Life of Zack & Cody and The Suite Life on Deck.

Meli works at Dubbing Brothers, C.D. Cine Dubbing, LaBibi.it, and other dubbing studios in Italy.

== Dubbing roles ==
=== Anime and animation ===
- Natsu Dragneel in Fairy Tail
- Phineas Flynn in Phineas and Ferb
- Phineas Flynn/Phineas-2 in Phineas and Ferb the Movie: Across the 2nd Dimension
- Leo in Little Einsteins
- Brewster in Chuggington
- Lelouch Lamperouge (younger) in Code Geass
- Jude Sharp in Inazuma Eleven
- Tod in The Fox and the Hound 2
- Hajime in Prétear
- Tad in Finding Nemo
- Leo in Little Einsteins
- Charlie in Charlie and Lola
- Binky in The Fairly OddParents
- Wayne in Higglytown Heroes
- Andy Baker/Fury in Ghostforce
- Tarzan in Tarzan II
- Logan Rivera in Sarah Lee Jones (since 2015)
- Richie Rich in Harvey Girls Forever!
- Thumper in Bambi II
- Rintoo in Ni Hao, Kai-Lan
- Ernie Krinklesac in The Cleveland Show
- Diego in Go, Diego, Go!
- Roo in Pooh's Heffalump Movie
- George Little in Stuart Little: The Animated Series
- Cheng in Skyland
- Jib in Candy Land: The Great Lollipop Adventure
- Eckle in Planet 51
- Lewis in Meet the Robinsons
- Ash Fox in Fantastic Mr. Fox
- Kazuya Gordon in Scan2Go
- Shō in Arrietty
- Banagher Links in Mobile Suit Gundam Unicorn
- Seiji Amasawa in Whisper of the Heart
- Hikaru Kujo in Futari wa Pretty Cure Max Heart
- Niko in The Flight Before Christmas
- Yankee Irving in Everyone's Hero
- Kenny in Firebreather
- Shoma Takakura and Penguin 2 in Mawaru Pingudoramu
- Fred Luckpuig in Lucky Fred
- Bala in The Jungle Book
- Taiki Kudou in Digimon Fusion
- Ekko in Arcane
- Laios in Delicious in Dungeon
- Kid in Secret Level
- Thad in Murder Drones

=== Live action shows and films ===
- Nick Daley in Night at the Museum
- Ronnie Tyler in The Fourth Kind
- Evan Taylor in August Rush
- Eddie Tudor and Tom Canty in A Modern Twain Story: The Prince and the Pauper
- Billy Madsen in Wild Hogs
- Micheal Myers in Halloween
- Cody Martin in The Suite Life of Zack & Cody
- Cody Martin in The Suite Life on Deck
- Cody Martin in The Suite Life Movie
- Josh in Blue's Clues & You!
- James "JJ" Powell, Jr in No Ordinary Family
- Arthur in Arthur and the Revenge of Maltazard
- Tom Brooks in Gary Unmarried
- Jack in Everybody's Fine
- Lee Pearson in Aliens in the Attic
- Micah Sanders in Heroes
- Lex Martin in Flight 29 Down
- Billy Madsen in Wild Hogs
- Esqueleto/Steven in Nacho Libre
- Joe Lamb in Super 8
- Carl Montclaire in Wingin' It
- Jim in Chatroom
- Jimmy Boland in Falling Skies
- Zachary "Zach" Florrick in The Good Wife
- Dustin in Hesher
- Noah Curtis in 2012
- Deuce Martinez in Shake It Up
- Peeta Mellark in The Hunger Games
- Ryder Scanlon in Melissa & Joey
- Dylan Mae in We Bought a Zoo
- Dante Ontero in Level Up
- Danny Matheson in Revolution
- Charlie Kelmeckis in The Perks of Being a Wallflower
- Joffrey Baratheon in Game of Thrones
- Dez in Austin & Ally
- Dustin Brooks in Zoey 101
- Aladdin in Aladdin
- Stanley Barber in I Am Not Okay with This
- Sebastian Valtor in Fate: The Winx Saga
- Roronoa Zoro in One Piece
- Zuko in Avatar: The Last Airbender
- Zane Asher in Gormiti - The New Era
- Ian in Obsession

=== Video games ===
- Phineas Flynn/Phineas-2 in Phineas and Ferb: Across the 2nd Dimension
- Jude Sharp in Inazuma Eleven
- Simba in Disney Friends

== See also ==
- List of non-English-language Phineas and Ferb voice actors
