= Caro Michele =

1976 film

- Film poster
- Directed by: Mario Monicelli
- Written by: Suso Cecchi d'Amico; Natalia Ginzburg; Tonino Guerra
- Starring: Mariangela Melato
- Cinematography: Tonino Delli Colli
- Music by: Nino Rota
- Release date: June 1976
- Running time: 108 minutes
- Country: Italy
- Language: Italian

Caro Michele is a 1976 Italian comedy film directed by Mario Monicelli. It was entered into the 26th Berlin International Film Festival, where Monicelli won the Silver Bear for Best Director.

== Cast ==
- Mariangela Melato as Mara Castorelli
- Delphine Seyrig as Adriana Vivanti, the mother
- Aurore Clément as Angelica Vivanti
- Lou Castel as Osvaldo
- Fabio Carpi as Fabio Colarosa
- Marcella Michelangeli as Viola Vivanti
- Alfonso Gatto as Vivanti padre
- Eriprando Visconti as Filippo
- Isa Danieli as Livia, Mara's friend
- Renato Romano as Oreste, Angelica's husband
- Giuliana Calandra as Ada, Osvaldo's wife
- Costantino Carrozza as Livia's Husband
- Luca Dal Fabbro as Ray
- Adriana Innocenti as Matilde, Adriana's sister-in-law
- Loredana Martínez as Mara's Cousin
- Eleonora Morana as Colarosa's Servant
- Alfredo Pea as Livia's Brother-in-Law
