= Gianluca Crisafi =

Italian voice actor (born 1974)

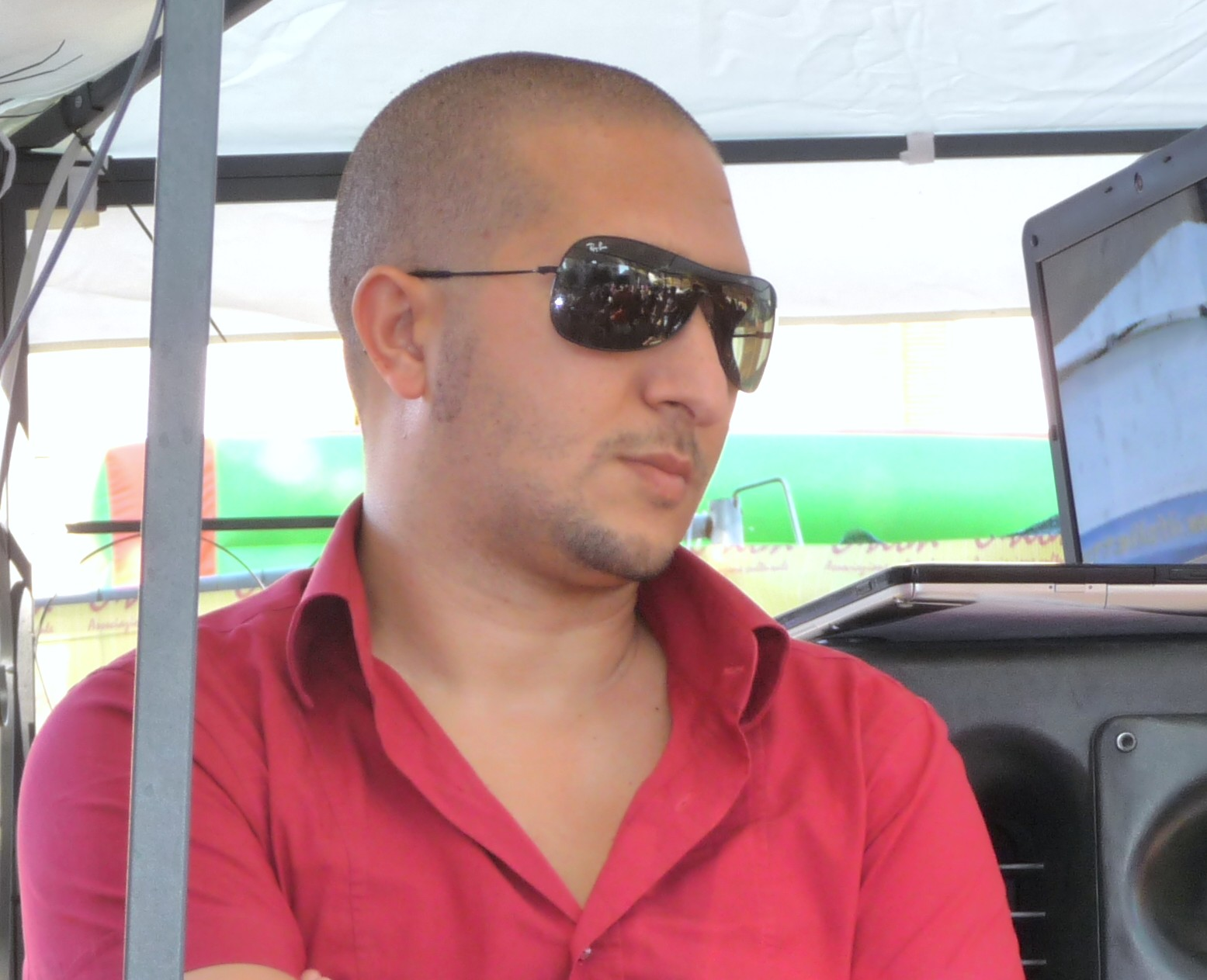
- Crisafi in 2010
- Born: 11 November 1974 (age 51); Rome, Italy
- Occupation: Voice actor
- Spouse(s): Perla Liberatori (2010–?; divorced)
- Children: 1

Gianluca Crisafi (born 11 November 1974) is an Italian voice actor.

Crisafi voiced the characters Andy and Brandon in the Winx Club animated TV series. He has dubbed the voices of Kevin Levin in the Italian-language version of Ben 10 and Irving in the Disney Channel animated series Phineas and Ferb.

Crisafi was previously married to voice actress Perla Liberatori, they have one son and later divorced.

== Biography ==
At about age 10, Crisafi began to study dance, acting and singing. In the 1990s he wrote and hosted several radio and TV programs for local stations and became a publicist journalist, also publishing three books. Also in the 1990s, he became the lead singer of the groups 69ers, Other Things Band, and G.A.B.

In 2004, Crisafi decided to devote himself to voice acting, and among his first major roles were those in the series Queer as Folk, Green Wing, and State of Play. He works in the animated films Madagascar, Bee Movie, Shrek the Third, and many others, and in the animated series Ben 10, Ed, Edd n Eddy, and Death Note, to name a few. He dubbed for Kellan Lutz in the movie Let the End Begin and in the TV show The Comeback, Shawn Hatosy in The Cooler, Jonah Hill in Don't Dump Me, Josh Gad in the series Parents Live, and Edward Furlong in Jimmy and Judy. He was the official voice actor for Ezekiel in the Total Drama franchise starting in the second season, replacing Corrado Conforti.

Since 2008, Crisafi has voiced the character of Eric Northman in the HBO television series True Blood, Jesse Tyler Ferguson, previously voiced in The Class - Friends Forever, in the series Modern Family, and Gerardo Chendo in the series Flor - Special Like You and Teen Angels. Also in 2010 he dubbed for Steve Howey in the series Reba.

In 2009 he wrote his first play, Fa come se fossi a casa mia, in which he also starred, debuting first at Teatro dell'Orologio and a few months later at Teatro de Servi in Rome. From here began his association with Teatro de Servi, because in 2010, again directed by Davide Lepore, he wrote and performed in his second play, Hai un minuto per me?, and in 2011 he repeated himself with I colori dell'amore. In the 2012-2013 season, with a partly new company and directed by Gennaro Monti, he is on stage again, at Teatro de Servi, with his latest new play, Io so che tu sai che la famiglia non sa.

Since 2009, he has also begun dialogue work, signing the series Winx Club, Los Lunnis, Parents Live, One Tree Hill, Skins, Battle Spirits, Ava, Riko, Teo, Shin Chan, PopPixie, Sea Patrol, Fish 'n Chips, and Jewelpet.

== Voice work ==
- Andy (season 4+) and Brandon (season 5+) in Winx Club
- Agent Falvetta in This World Can't Tear Me Down

=== Dubbing ===
==== Animation ====
- Kevin Levin in Ben 10, Ben 10: Alien Force, and Ben 10: Ultimate Alien
- Koga in InuYasha: The Final Act
- Irving in Phineas and Ferb
- Tsubasa Andō in Alice Academy
- Ezekiel in Total Drama Action, Total Drama World Tour
- Sigma in Battle B-Daman
- Percy Pea in VeggieTales
- Atchan in Hi Hi Puffy AmiYumi
- Marcos Gonzalez in Shuriken School
- Kevin in Ed, Edd n Eddy, Ed, Edd n Eddy's Big Picture Show
- Jin Kazama in Tekken: Blood Vengeance
- Artenborough Cortich in Gurren Lagann

==== Live-action ====
- Intelligence Officer Leon Broznic in Rush
- Boyce in Green Wing
- Ryan Church in Back to You
- Serge in Until Death
- Michael Novotny in Queer as Folk
- Davis in Accidentally on Purpose
- Max Regnery in The Saddle Club
- Jeff McCann in Eyes
- Dan Foster in State of Play
- Larry Summers in Blue Mountain State
- Tumelo in Life Is Wild
