= Michele Baldi =

Italian footballer

Personal information
- Date of birth: 25 April 1972 (age 54)
- Place of birth: Bentivoglio, Italy
- Height: 1.76 m (5 ft 9 in)
- Position: Midfielder

Senior career*
Years	Team	Apps	(Gls)
1990–1991	San Lazzaro	33	(3)
1991–1993	Perugia	31	(0)
1993–1994	Potenza	29	(1)
1994–1996	Pescara	64	(6)
1996–1997	Venezia	30	(2)
1997–1998	Como	12	(1)
1998–2002	Pescara	75	(2)
2000–2001	→ Chievo (loan)	7	(0)
2002–2003	Cosenza	16	(0)
2003–2006	Castel San Pietro	65	(2)
2006–2007	RC Angolana		
2007	Miglianico		
2008–2009	RC Angolana		
2009–2010	Feltrese		
Total		362	(17)

Managerial career
- 2010: Feltrese
- 2012: Romano d'Ezzelino
- 2012–2017: Bassano Virtus (assistant)
- 2017–2018: Belluno
- 2020–2021: Schio
- * Club domestic league appearances and goals

Michele Baldi (born 25 April 1972), is an Italian former professional footballer who played as a midfielder.

== Career ==
Baldi began his professional career at the age of 18 with San Lazzaro. During his career, he played for several Serie B and Serie C1 clubs, most notably Pescara, where he played for seven seasons. Before retiring, he played for some Eccellenza teams, such as Miglianico.

Baldi started his career as a coach at Feltrese shortly after he stopped playing. He also had spells at Romano d'Ezzelino, Bassano Virtus where he performed several roles, Belluno and Schio.
