= Antonella Baldini =

Italian voice actress (born 1966)

- Born: 11 May 1966 (age 60); Milan, Italy
- Occupation: Voice actress
- Relatives: Nanni Baldini (brother); Oreste Baldini (brother)

Antonella Baldini (born 11 May 1966) is an Italian actress, voice actress and singer.

== Biography ==
Entering the show business as a child, Antonella Baldini won the 12th edition of the singing competition Zecchino d'Oro (1970) and worked as a child actor in films directed by Vittorio De Sica, Damiano Damiani, and Nelo Risi; she also performed onstage and in television.

Through the years, her career gradually transitioned into voice acting, a path later followed by all her three siblings, Rita, Nanni and Oreste. Baldini provides the Italian voice of the protagonists Maya the Bee (Maya the Honey Bee and other products) and Timmy Turner in the long running Nickelodeon animated series The Fairly OddParents. She also dubs Gosalyn Mallard in the Italian-language version of Darkwing Duck, Hayley Smith in the animated sitcom American Dad!, Beth Smith in Rick and Morty, and many other characters in both animation and live action.

Baldini works at Dubbing Brothers, LaBibi.it, C.D. Cine Dubbing and other dubbing studios in Italy.

== Filmography ==
=== Cinema ===
- Il giardino dei Finzi Contini (1970)
- Lo chiameremo Andrea (1972)
- The Assassin of Rome (1972)
- The Infamous Column (1973)

=== Television ===
- Diario di un giudice – TV miniseries (1978)
- La tela del ragno – TV film (1980)
- 44 gatti – TV programme (1993)

=== Voice work ===
- Pimpa – Animated TV series (1983) – Various characters
- Sandokan – La tigre della Malesia – Animated TV series (1998) – Marianna
- I Magotti e la pentola magica – Animated film (2001) – Noga
- Nefertina sul Nilo – Animated TV series (2021) – Nefertina
- Da Amazzone a Afrodite – documentary (2022)

==== Dubbing ====
===== Animation =====
- Timmy Turner in The Fairly OddParents
- Beth in Total Drama series
- Amy Rose in Sonic X
- Hayley Smith in American Dad!
- Hange Zoë in Attack on Titan
- Ayame Sarutobi in Gin Tama
- Buddy in Dinosaur Train
- Vana Glama in Sidekick
- Dan Bashin in Battle Spirits: Shōnen Gekiha Dan
- Rei in Shinzo
- Ms. Marvel in The Super Hero Squad Show
- Ursula Scott in George of the Jungle (2007 TV series)
- Tira Misu in Sorcerer Hunters
- Miranda Jones in Transformers: Energon
- Penelope in Barbie as Rapunzel
- Gosalyn Mallard in Darkwing Duck
- Fang in Dave the Barbarian
- Azusa Shiga in Laughing Target
- Maetel in Maetel Legend
- Amber in Dink, the Little Dinosaur
- Bradley in Stickin' Around
- Macie Lightfoot in As Told by Ginger
- Yae Oda in Nabari no Ou
- Rakshata Chawla in Code Geass: Lelouch of the Rebellion
- Daffodil in Clifford's Puppy Days
- Buzz in Freakazoid!
- Hakudoshi in InuYasha: The Final Act
- Rolly in 101 Dalmatians: The Series
- Emma in Four Eyes!
- Isabelle in Eliot Kid
- Rosa Santos in Maya & Miguel
- Georgie in Georgie!
- Rubble in PAW Patrol
- Anne Shipley in Anne of Green Gables
- Beth in Watch My Chops
- Melody Locus in My Life as a Teenage Robot
- Huey Duck in Quack Pack
- Junior Asparagus in VeggieTales
- Sidetable Drawer in Blue's Clues
- Tiger's Mom in Kipper
- Maria in Harvey Girls Forever!
- Mie Delgado in Battle B-Daman
- Moemi Hayakawa in Video Girl Ai
- Erica in Tomodachi Life: The TV Series
- Iggy in Camp Candy
- Ling Jouyan in Legend of the Dragon
- Backpack in Dora the Explorer
- Creepie Creecher in Growing Up Creepie
- Tasha in The Backyardigans
- Ranmaru and Lalissa in Haikara-san ga Tōru
- Steelheart in SilverHawks
- Sylia Stingray in Bubblegum Crisis
- Princess Lana in Captain N: The Game Master
- Tina in The Little Flying Bears
- Arisa Sono in All Purpose Cultural Cat Girl Nuku Nuku
- Martin Morning in Martin Morning
- Yuri Tokikago in Penguin Drum
- Ikuko Miyaura in A Letter to Momo
- Rudy Tabootie in ChalkZone
- Carmilla Carmine in Hazbin Hotel
- Nagisa in Daemons of the Shadow Realm

===== Live action =====
- Cara in Legend of the Seeker
- Caitlin Todd in NCIS
- Kaurie Keller in Cougar Town
- Amy Duncan in Good Luck Charlie
- Rose in Two and a Half Men
- Vicki Greer in Old Dogs
- Lizzie Morrison in Dear Frankie
- Stevie in The Machinist
- Audrey Bingham in Rules of Engagement (TV series)
- Amelia "Mel" Silver in Waking the Dead (TV series)
- Catherine (Cat) Avery Pascal (1st voice) in Acapulco H.E.A.T.
- David Scali in The Commish
- Glenda Fry in Mortified
- Kimmy Kim in Pepper Dennis
- Carmie Batista in Ciao Bella
- Marguerite Krux in Sir Arthur Conan Doyle's The Lost World
- Veronica in Out of the Blue (1996 TV series)
- Paula Bell in Malice
- and others

== See also ==
- List of American Dad! voice actors
