= TeachTown =

Educational software company

- Type: Privately Held
- Industry: Software
- Founded: 2003
- Founders: Chris Whalen, Lars Liden, Eric Dallaire, Sven Liden
- Headquarters: Woburn, Massachusetts
- Website: TeachTown

TeachTown is an American company that provides educational software to schools, clinicians and parents for children diagnosed with autism spectrum disorder, developmental disabilities, intellectual disabilities, or emotional and behavior disorders. TeachTown’s suite of special education curriculum provides students with moderate to severe disabilities equitable and inclusive access to the general education curriculum and the individualized interventions that support their success.

== History ==
TeachTown was founded in Seattle, Washington in 2003. TeachTown had financial backing from the Washington Research Foundation following its second-prize win of the University of Washington's business plan competition. This was soon followed up with support from Seattle-based angel investors, and Kevin MacDonald joining to lead technical operations.

In 2006, TeachTown merged with Animated Speech Corporation. Daniel Feshbach became TeachTown's largest investor and CEO. In 2009, Terry Thoren took on the role of president and CEO. Three years later, Dave Cappellucci assumed the CEO position, with Dan Feshbach remaining as chairman of the board. The company was re-capitalized and TeachTown became a subsidiary of Jigsaw Learning LLC.

Bain Capital acquired TeachTown in 2021 through its Bain Capital Double Impact program. After TeachTown was acquired by Bain Capital, the company had a new executive leadership team with Richard Becker as CEO.

In June 2024, L Squared Capital Partners acquired TeachTown from Bain Capital Double Impact.
