= Lego Scooby-Doo! Blowout Beach Bash =

- Blu-ray cover
- Directed by: Ethan Spaulding
- Written by: Emily Brundige; Aaron Preacher
- Based on: Scooby-Doo by Joe Ruby and Ken Spears; Lego Construction Toys
- Produced by: Rick Morales; Sam Register; Jill Wilfert; Robert Fewkes; Jason Cosler
- Starring: Frank Welker; Grey DeLisle; Matthew Lillard; Kate Micucci
- Music by: Robert J. Kral
- Production companies: Warner Bros. Animation; The Lego Group
- Distributed by: Warner Bros. Home Entertainment
- Release dates: July 11, 2017 (digital); July 25, 2017 (DVD and Blu-ray)
- Running time: 78 minutes
- Country: United States
- Language: English

Lego Scooby-Doo! Blowout Beach Bash is a 2017 American animated adventure comedy film, and the twenty-ninth entry in the direct-to-video series of Scooby-Doo films, as well as the second in the series to be based on the Scooby-Doo brand of Lego. It was released digitally on July 11, 2017, and on DVD and Blu-ray on July 25, 2017.

== Synopsis ==
After solving a mystery that involves Dr. Najib posing as a mummy, Scooby-Doo, Shaggy, Fred, Daphne, and Velma feel like taking a break and having some fun. The museum guard suggests that they go to the Blowout Beach Bash. The gang agrees, and they take off in the Mystery Machine towards the Bash. During the trip, Shaggy, Scooby and Daphne make fun of Fred and Velma, saying they are obsessed with mysteries and are no fun. Fred and Velma decide to prove that they are fun by being crowned this year's 'Captains of the Bash'.

However, when they arrive, they find the beach and boardwalk deserted. They go to the Holdout Inn, and find out from the inn's owners - Rob and Laura Holdout - that during the morning, two ghost pirates arrived at the beach and scared away all of the teenagers partying there. They also stole the pirate hats off of the 'Bash Captains' - Chad and Krissy Holdout, Rob and Laura's children. Rob Holdout tells the gang the story of the ghost pirates, describing the first ever Blowout Beach Bash, what happened with Captain Brutamore Bash and Pirate Queen Bingo Bell, and the missing treasure. Right after that, a greedy businessman named Dwight Monkfish arrives at the inn with the sheriff, the deputy, and his assistant, Mitzi Capaletto. He accuses the Holdouts of the pirate attack earlier that day, but they deny it. Chad and Krissy appear, and are mean to the gang, making fun of Fred's ascot and insulting Scooby-Doo. The gang tells the police that they're mystery solvers, and that they can help them with their investigation.

Fred decides the gang should split up and gather clues to solve the case; Daphne will investigate the pier to find out what she can from Monkfish, while Shaggy and Scooby will check out the ghost pirates' ship, the Salty Brick. Velma convinces Shaggy and Scooby to investigate by telling them that there is a snack bar on the ship, although this is not true. Instead, there is a boring tour of the ship, led by the Tour Guide. They decided to go to the ship's galley to see if they can find anything to eat.

Meanwhile, Fred and Velma go check out the Octo Rock Lounge. They encounter Chad and Krissy, but they are once again mean to them and tell Fred and Velma go away. At the pier, Daphne talks with Dwight Monkfish, and he tells her about his plan to transform the town by turning the beach and boardwalk into piers. After he goes to a photo shoot, Daphne asks Mitzi some questions about the pirate attack, Rob Holdout, the pirates themselves, and a poem about the missing treasure. Back at the Octo Rock Lounge, Velma accidentally invents a new dance move called the 'Jinky'. Fred and Velma teach the 'Jinky' dance to their new friends Tommy and Brenda, and soon the other teens join in on the dancing. Chad and Krissy are annoyed by this and attempt to convince the other teens to leave, but are unsuccessful and storm off.

At the Salty Brick, Shaggy and Scooby encounter the ghost pirates, which leads into a chase around the ship. They successfully escape by distracting the pirates, and flee back to shore, while the pirates take control of the ship and sail away.

Daphne goes to the Octo Rock Lounge to talk to Fred and Velma, but finds them dancing with the other teens instead of investigating. Their attitudes have changed completely, which annoys Daphne. Shaggy and Scooby arrive at the Octo Rock Lounge to tell the rest of the gang about their encounter with the pirates, but the pirates show up and terrorize everyone. The gang hides, but the pirates manage to capture Tommy and Brenda.

The gang returns to the Holdout Inn to discuss everything, causing an argument. Rob and Laura walk the gang towards their rooms, where Scooby accidentally discovers the old secret tunnels that the smugglers used. The gang find the Holdouts' room and the police station, but they get lost on their way back towards their room. They accidentally discover a hidden harbor with the Salty Brick, along with Tommy and Brenda. Fred decides to set up a trap for the pirates.

When the pirates return, a chase occurs, with the gang ending up in their own trap. They are forced to walk the plank, but Tommy and Brenda arrive in a speedboat, helping the gang escape. However, the pirates chase after them in their ship and wreak havoc across the boardwalk and the beach. At night, everyone gathers on the beach around a campfire, where the Holdouts tell them that they've agreed to sell their property to Monkfish. Monkfish appears and insults the Holdouts, which causes Mitzi to scold him. Fred lightens up everyone's mood and comes up with a plan to stop the pirates.

The next day, Fred announces they are going to crown the 'Captains of the Bash'. He plans to use Tommy and Brenda to lure the pirates into their net trap. However, things do not go smoothly, as the pirates target Fred and Velma instead. Another chase occurs between the pirates and the gang, with Fred formulating another plan. The gang trick the pirates into going on the roller coaster, which ends up flinging Shaggy and Scooby onto the Ferris wheel and the pirates into a net, where they are captured.

The ghost pirates are revealed to be Chad and Krissy, and Velma explains that they just couldn't let go of their titles as 'Captains of the Bash' and tried to shut down the celebration to avoid giving up their title. Velma also announces that there are actually two sets of ghost pirates, with the other pair being Rob and Laura Holdout. Velma explains the evidence: Mr. Holdout said that the best way to solve the case was to work as a team, one set of pirates seemed to move slower than the other, the bell switching from left-handed to right-handed, their knowledge of the town, how they would benefit from the destruction of the boardwalk, and other pieces of evidence. Rob and Laura confess to their crimes, and say that they only wanted to find the missing treasure and needed to hold onto the hats so they could keep looking. Daphne also reveals that the sheriff and the deputy sabotaged the roller coaster to stop tourism so they didn't have to work as hard. The sheriff and deputy boast that they are the only law in the town, and therefore can't be arrested. However, the museum guard shows up with Dr. Najib and arrests all the villains.

Later, Velma successfully solves the poem of the missing treasure and they use the treasure to rebuild the boardwalk, after Monkfish has a change of heart and returns the property. Tommy and Brenda crown the gang the 'Captains of the Bash', and they all celebrate by throwing a party.

== Cast ==
- Frank Welker as Scooby-Doo, Fred Jones
- Matthew Lillard as Shaggy Rogers
- Kate Micucci as Velma Dinkley
- Grey DeLisle as Daphne Blake, Laura Holdout, Ghost of Bingo Bell
- Jeff Bennett as Deputy, Museum Tour Guide
- Kate Higgins as Brenda
- Josh Keaton as Chad Holdout, Tommy
- Tom Kenny as Rob Holdout
- Natalie Lander as Krissy Holdout
- Jack McBrayer as Police Officer
- Kevin Michael Richardson as Ghost of Captain Bash, Sheriff
- Fred Tatasciore as Dwight Monkfish
- Iqbal Theba as Dr. Najib
- Hynden Walch as Mitzi Capaletto

== Reception ==
Renee Longstreet for Common Sense Media gave the film a two out of five star rating and commented, "No surprises in this routine adventure for the gang; they behave in expected ways, solve an expected mystery, and manage a few funny jokes and sight gags about their short, blocky limitations. It's harder for the filmmakers to provide the cartoon spookiness fans are used to. Ghosts and pirates made of synthetic material simply can't be scary apparitions or swash and buckle like they can when animators are given a free hand. Still, it's a typical tale that fans have come to enjoy. The good guys aren't always what they seem to be. Shaggy and Scooby never seem to get enough to eat. Velma uses her problem-solving skills to unearth the culprits. And the gang makes sure that the annual Blowout Beach Bash will live another year."

== See also ==
- Lego Scooby-Doo
- Lego Scooby-Doo! Knight Time Terror
- Lego Scooby-Doo! Haunted Hollywood
