= Lego Scooby-Doo! Knight Time Terror =

2015 U.S. television special

- Based on: Scooby-Doo by Joe Ruby and Ken Spears Lego Construction Toys
- Written by: Heath Corson
- Directed by: Rick Morales
- Starring: Frank Welker; Matthew Lillard; Kate Micucci; Grey DeLisle
- Music by: Robert J. Kral
- Country of origin: United States
- Original language: English

Production
- Executive producers: Sam Register; Jill Wilfert; Jason Cosler
- Producers: Jason Cosler; Rebecca Platanik; Alan Burnett
- Editor: Craig Paulsen
- Running time: 22 minutes
- Production companies: The Lego Group; Warner Bros. Animation

Original release
- Network: Cartoon Network
- Release: November 25, 2015

Lego Scooby-Doo: Knight Time Terror (also known as Scooby-Doo! Knight Time Terror) is a movie special in Lego animation, based upon the Scooby-Doo Saturday morning cartoons. It was created to promote the new Scooby-Doo Lego sets, which aired on Cartoon Network on November 25, 2015.

== Plot ==
Mystery Inc. is called to investigate a haunted mansion, where a Black Knight terrorizes anyone who approaches in search of treasure, hidden by the owner many years ago. They must overcome many traps and dangers, but once again Scooby and his friends prove up to the task.

== Cast ==
- Frank Welker as Scooby-Doo, Fred Jones
- Matthew Lillard as Norville "Shaggy" Rogers
- Kate Micucci as Velma Dinkley
- Grey DeLisle as Daphne Blake
- Phil Morris as Adam, Phil (credited as Treasure Hunter #1)
- Sean Schemmel as Charlie Grimsley, Treasure Hunter #2
- Jason Spisak as Kyle Grimsley, Black Knight
- Colleen Villard as Wanda Grimsley

== Broadcast ==
LEGO Scooby-Doo: Knight Time Terror made its global debut on Teletoon in Canada on October 2, 2015. The special premiered on Boomerang channels in the United Kingdom and Ireland in late October 2015 and debuted in Australia and New Zealand on January 26, 2016.

== Reception ==
The special was watched by 1.67 million viewers and received a 0.4 rating in adults 18-49.

== See also ==
- Lego Scooby-Doo
- Lego Scooby-Doo! Haunted Hollywood
- Lego Scooby-Doo! Blowout Beach Bash
