= The Last Wagon =

The Last Wagon can refer to:

- The Last Wagon (1943 film), an Italian comedy directed by Mario Mattoli
- The Last Wagon (1956 film), an American western starring Richard Widmark
