= Francesco Prando =

Italian actor

- Born: 22 February 1960 (age 66); Rome, Italy
- Occupations: Actor; voice actor
- Years active: 1985–present
- Children: 1
- Parents: Marcello Prando (father); Luciana Durante (mother)
- Relatives: Checco Durante (grandfather); Anita Durante (grandmother); Lelia Durante (aunt)

Francesco Prando (born 22 February 1960) is an Italian actor and voice actor.

== Biography ==
Prando was born in Rome to actors Marcello Prando and Luciana Durante. His maternal grandparents were actors Checco and Anita Durante. His most long-lived acting role was that of commissioner Carlo Angiò in the Italian TV series Incantesimo, which he played for six years. He also acted in films, such as ACAB - All Cops Are Bastards.

As a voice actor, Prando is renowned for dubbing over the voices of Vince Vaughn, Daniel Craig, Matthew McConaughey, Guy Pearce and Michael Fassbender. He has also dubbed over Luke Perry, Keanu Reeves, Jason Statham, Paul Rudd and many more. Some of his popular dubbing roles include Will Truman (portrayed by Eric McCormack) in the Italian version of Will & Grace.

In Prando's animated roles, he voiced Ned Flanders in the Italian dub of The Simpsons since the 24th episode of the 3rd season, replacing Pino Insegno, and Ryoji Kaji in Neon Genesis Evangelion. He also performed the Italian voices of Prince Charming in the Shrek films, Phineas T. Ratchet in Robots, Li Shang in Mulan and many more. He also serves as announcer for the Italian TV channel La7.

== Filmography ==
=== Cinema ===
- Oltre la notte (1993)
- L'anniversario [it] (1999)
- Another World [it] (2010)
- ACAB – All Cops Are Bastards (2012)
- Le leggi del desiderio (2015)

=== Television ===
- La piovra, season 7 - TV Series (1995)
- Don Milani - Il priore di Barbiana (1997) - TV Film
- Incantesimo (2000-2006)
- Carabinieri - TV series, first two episodes (2001)
- R.I.S. Roma - Delitti imperfetti, season 3 - TV series (2012)
- Squadra antimafia – Palermo oggi (2014) - TV Series, 3 episodes
- Squadra mobile[it] - TV Series (2017)

== Voice work ==
- Corricorri in L'isola degli smemorati, Sulle ali dei gabbiani - L'isola va in città
- Oritel in Winx Club: The Secret of the Lost Kingdom, Winx Club 3D: Magical Adventure
- Blister and Winston in 44 Cats

=== Dubbing roles ===
==== Animation ====
- Ryoji Kaji in Neon Genesis Evangelion, Neon Genesis Evangelion: Death & Rebirth, Neon Genesis Evangelion: The End of Evangelion, Evangelion: 3.0+1.0 Thrice Upon a Time
- Ralph Wolf (since 1995) and Wile E. Coyote (1996-2006) in Looney Tunes and Merrie Melodies; Wile E. Coyote in The Bugs Bunny/Road Runner Movie (1999 redub)
- Ned Flanders (episode 3.24 and on) and various characters in The Simpsons, Ned Flanders in The Simpsons Movie
- Li Shang in Mulan, Mulan II
- Buster Moon in Sing, Sing 2
- Lion-O in ThunderCats
- Winston in 44 Cats
- Prince Charming in Shrek 2, Shrek the Third
- Mic and Pongo in Disney's House of Mouse
- John Rolfe in Pocahontas II: Journey to a New World
- Phineas T. Ratchet in Robots
- Wenlock in Barbie and the Magic of Pegasus
- Roddy St. James in Flushed Away
- Pongo in 101 Dalmatians II: Patch's London Adventure
- Derek Dietl in Monsters vs. Aliens
- King Arthur in Quest for Camelot
- Charles Deveraux in Tomb Raider: The Legend of Lara Croft

==== Live action ====
- Erik Lehnsherr / Magneto in X-Men: First Class, X-Men: Days of Future Past, X-Men: Apocalypse, X-Men: Dark Phoenix
- James Bond in Casino Royale, Quantum of Solace, Skyfall, Spectre, No Time to Die
- Lee Christmas in The Expendables, The Expendables 2, The Expendables 3
- Deckard Shaw in Fast & Furious 6, Furious 7, The Fate of the Furious
- Wayne Campbell in Wayne's World, Wayne's World 2
- Thomas Wayne in Batman Begins, The Batman
- Brian Fantana in Anchorman: The Legend of Ron Burgundy, Anchorman 2: The Legend Continues
- David 8 in Prometheus, David 8 / Walter 1 in Alien: Covenant
- Luke Skywalker in Star Wars: Episode VIII – The Last Jedi, Star Wars: Episode IX – The Rise of Skywalker
- Dinky Winks in Spy Kids 2: The Island of Lost Dreams, Spy Kids 3-D: Game Over
- Narrator in The Dukes of Hazzard: The Beginning, Jeanne du Barry
- John "Sheriff" Volgecherev in Return to Paradise
- Norman Bates in Psycho (1998 film)
- Lester Long in Clay Pigeons
- Rick Barnes in Domestic Disturbance
- Ricky Slade in Made
- Peter LaFleur in DodgeBall: A True Underdog Story
- Raji Lowenthal in Be Cool
- Eddie in Mr. & Mrs. Smith
- Gary Grobowski in The Break-Up
- Dave in Couples Retreat
- Ronny Valentine in The Dilemma
- Bob McAllister in The Watch
- Rosie in Lay the Favorite
- Nick Campbell in The Internship
- Alan in A Case of You
- David Wozniak in Delivery Man
- Dan Trunkman in Unfinished Business
- Howell in Hacksaw Ridge
- Hutch Morgan in Fighting with My Family
- Frank Semyon in True Detective
- Roger Sherman Baldwin in Amistad
- Andrew Tyler in U-571
- Steve Edison in The Wedding Planner
- Troy in Thirteen Conversations About One Thing
- Steven Bedalia in Tiptoes
- Jack Lengyel in We Are Marshall
- Connor Mead in Ghosts of Girlfriends Past
- Mickey Haller in The Lincoln Lawyer
- Joe Cooper in Killer Joe
- Mark Hanna in The Wolf of Wall Street
- Ward Jansen in The Paperboy
- Mud in Mud
- Ron Woodroof in Dallas Buyers Club
- Joseph Cooper in Interstellar
- Arthur Brennan in The Sea of Trees
- Newton Knight in Free State of Jones
- Kenny Wells in Gold
- Walter Padick in The Dark Tower
- John Mason / Baker Dill in Serenity
- Brett in Dating the Enemy
- Ed Exley in L.A. Confidential
- Alexander Hartdegen in The Time Machine
- Aidan McRory in Two Brothers
- Charlie Burns in The Proposition
- Jimmy Starks in First Snow
- Andy Warhol in Factory Girl
- Matthew Thompson in The Hurt Locker
- Roy Clayton in Traitor
- Kendall Duncan in Bedtime Stories
- Alex Hurst in Don't Be Afraid of the Dark
- Simon in Seeking Justice
- Marion Snow in Lockout
- Aldrich Killian in Iron Man 3
- Jonas in Equals
- Evan Birch in Spinning Man
- Robert Furman in The Catcher Was a Spy
- Joe Martin in Domino
- Dylan McKay in Beverly Hills, 90210
- Fred Andrews in Riverdale
- Luke Perry in Christmas Vacation '95
- Chris Anderson in Normal Life
- Billy Masterson in The Fifth Element
- Ron Young in Storm
- Wayne Maunder in Once Upon a Time in Hollywood
- Will Truman in Will & Grace
- Sam Field in Borrowed Hearts
- Mason McGuire in Trust Me
- Daniel J. Pierce in Perception
- Grant MacLaren in Travelers
- Archie Hicox in Inglourious Basterds
- Quintus Dias in Centurion
- Brandon Sullivan in Shame
- Edward Fairfax Rochester in Jane Eyre (2011 film)
- Paul in Haywire
- Macbeth in Macbeth (2015 film)
- Cal Lynch / Aguilar de Nerha in Assassin's Creed
- Tom Sherbourne in The Light Between Oceans
- Cook in Song to Song
- Chad Cutler in Trespass Against Us
- Harry Hole in The Snowman
- Deckard Shaw in Fast & Furious: Hobbs & Shaw
- Luke Wright in Safe
- Rick Ford in Spy
- Nick Wild in Wild Card
- Arthur Bishop in Mechanic: Resurrection
- Master Kane in A Kid in King Arthur's Court
- Telford Winter in The Trench
- Ted Hughes in Sylvia
- Guy Crouchback in Sword of Honour
- Joe in Enduring Love
- XXXX in Layer Cake
- Christopher Kelso in Archangel
- Lord Asriel in The Golden Compass
- Joe Scot in Flashbacks of a Fool
- Tuvia Bielski in Defiance
- Jake Lonergan in Cowboys & Aliens
- Ivan Ivanovitch Sakharine in The Adventures of Tintin
- Will Atenton / Peter Ward in Dream House
- Benoit Blanc in Knives Out
- Josh Lucas in Clueless
- Adam Pearl in I Could Never Be Your Woman
- Don John in Much Ado About Nothing
- Siddhartha in Little Buddha
- Jack Traven in Speed
- Johnny Smith in Johnny Mnemonic
- Paul Sutton in A Walk in the Clouds
- Eddie Kasalivich in Chain Reaction
- Jjaks Clayton in Feeling Minnesota
- Julian Mercer in Something's Gotta Give
- Henry Torne in Henry's Crime
- John Wall in Generation Um...
- Kai in 47 Ronin
- Evan Webber in Knock Knock
- William Beckham in To the Bone
- William Foster in Replicas
- Keanu Reeves in Always Be My Maybe
- John H. Miller in Saving Private Ryan
- Steven Hiller in Independence Day
- Robert Clayton Dean in Enemy of the State
- Sam Carmichael in Mamma Mia!
- Danny O'Neill in Live Wire
- Mark Sloan in Grey's Anatomy
- Tom Chandler in The Last Ship
- Will Schuester in Glee
- Trip Tucker in Star Trek: Enterprise
- Jim Train in The Safety of Objects
- Paul Stanton in Inhale
- Richard Stoker in Stoker
- Steve Huberbrecht in August: Osage County
- Sean Brenner in Insidious: Chapter 3
- Lawrence Lanpher in Truth
- David Kelly in Dirty Grandpa
- Mark Robertson in The Mountain Between Us
- László Almásy in The English Patient
- Tony Angel in The Good Thief
- Michael Ebbs in The Chumscrubber
- Joe in Land of the Blind
- Stephen Tulloch in Chromophobia
- William Cavendish in The Duchess
- Caius Martius Coriolanus in Coriolanus
- M. Gustave in The Grand Budapest Hotel
- Harold Lowe in Titanic
- Kevin Shepherd in 102 Dalmatians
- Nick Easter in Runaway Jury
- Shep Wild in Ted 2
- Mobius M. Mobius in Loki
- Shintaro Kazama in Like a Dragon: Yakuza
