= Anita Durante =

Italian actress (1897–1994)

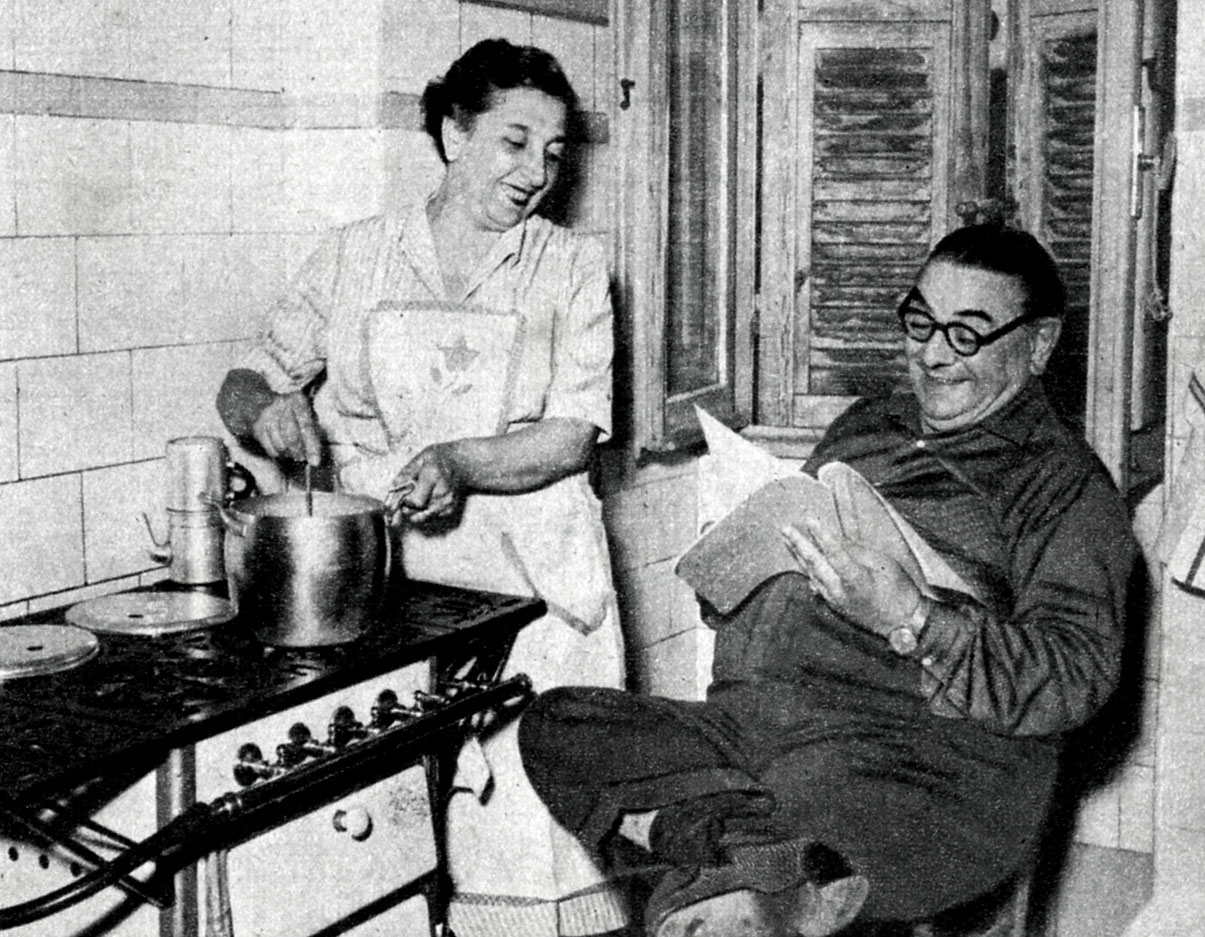
- Anita and Checco Durante in 1957
- Born: Anita Bianchi; 28 September 1897; Rome, Kingdom of Italy
- Died: 2 May 1994 (aged 96); Rome, Italy
- Occupation: Actress
- Relatives: Francesco Prando (grandson)

Anita Durante (28 September 1897 – 2 May 1994) was an Italian actress.

Born Anita Bianchi in Rome into a humble family, after attending a dramatic society for several years Durante made her official debut on stage in 1919, in Ettore Petrolini's Romani de Roma. Married with the actor Checco Durante, she stayed with the Petrolini's stage company nine years, then she formed a company with her husband. Also active in films, where she is best remembered as the Alberto Sordi's mother in An American in Rome, Durante was active on stage until 1992. She died in 1994, aged 96, following an accidental fall from the balcony of her home, while cleaning the windows.

== Partial filmography ==
- Scampolo (1941) - La proprietaria della stireria
- The Last Wagon (1943) - Adele Urbani
- Peddlin' in Society (1946) - Caterina (uncredited)
- Fatalità (1947) - Adele
- Cavalcade of Heroes (1950)
- The Two Sisters (1950) - Agatina
- The Ungrateful Heart (1951) - Anna, padrona della pensione
- Core 'ngrato (1951)
- Viva il cinema! (1952) - Gambalesta's Maid
- Vortice (1953) - La portinaia
- If You Won a Hundred Million (1953) - Pasqua (segment "Il promesso... sposato")
- Angels of Darkness (1954)
- Of Life and Love (1954) - (segment "La Patente")
- Papà Pacifico (1954) - The Porter
- Orient Express (1954)
- Guai ai vinti (1954) - Popolana sulla scala (uncredited)
- An American in Rome (1954) - Madre di Nando
- Il porto della speranza (1954)
- Il vetturale del Moncenisio (1954)
- The Sign of Venus (1955) - Madre di Agnese
- Bella non piangere (1955) - Zia di Nina
- A Hero of Our Times (1955)
- Roman Tales (1955) - La madre di Alvaro
- Cortile (1955) - Geltrude
- Processo all'amore (1955) - Nona Mariani
- The Bigamist (1956) - Amalia
- The Courier of Moncenisio (1956) - Carmela
- Il prezzo della gloria (1956) - Aunt Bettina
- I calunniatori (1956)
- Saranno uomini (1957)
- Ladro lui, ladra lei (1958) - Madre di Cencio
- Adorabili e bugiarde (1958) - The concierge's wife
- ...And the Wild Wild Women (1959) - Assunta
- Policarpo (1959) - Mario Marchetti's Mother
- Genitori in blue-jeans (1960) - The Old Nun (uncredited)
- Carmen di Trastevere (1962) - Landlady of the Boarding House (uncredited)
- Adultero lui, adultera lei (1963) - La portinaia
- Mad Sea (1963) - Rosario Lo Russo - la madre
- Siamo tutti pomicioni (1963) - Mario's Mother (segment "Le gioie della vita")
- White Voices (1964) - Agnese - Meo's mother
- Made in Italy (1965)
- Why Did I Ever Say Yes Twice? (1969) - (uncredited)
- Er Più – storia d'amore e di coltello (1971) - Mother of Nino
- Colpo grosso... grossissimo... anzi probabile (1972) - Monsignore's mother
- Storia di fifa e di coltello - Er seguito d'er più (1972) - Caterina
- Granada, addio! (1977) - Peppa
- I Hate Blondes (1980)
- Count Tacchia (1982) - Fernanda's Grandmother
- Giovanni Senzapensieri (1986) - Zia Teresa (final film role)
