= La piovra =

Italian television drama series

- DVD collection
- Genre: Political thriller; Crime drama
- Screenplay by: Ennio De Concini; Sandro Petraglia; Stefano Rulli; Alessandro Sermoneta; Mimmo Rafele; Andrea Porporati; Piero Bodrato
- Directed by: Damiano Damiani; Florestano Vancini; Luigi Perelli; Giacomo Battiato
- Starring: Michele Placido; Remo Girone; Vittorio Mezzogiorno; Patricia Millardet
- Theme music composer: Riz Ortolani; Ennio Morricone; Paolo Buonvino
- Country of origin: Italy
- Original language: Italian
- No. of seasons: 10
- No. of episodes: 48

Production
- Producer: Sergio Silva

Original release
- Network: RAI
- Release: March 11, 1984 – January 11, 2001

La Piovra (Italian pronunciation: [la ˈpjɔːvra]; English: The Octopus, referring to the Mafia) is an Italian television drama series about the Mafia. The series was directed by various directors who each worked on different seasons, including Damiano Damiani (first season), Florestano Vancini (second season), Luigi Perelli (from the third to the seventh season and again on the tenth season), and Giacomo Battiato (from the eighth to the ninth seasons). The music was written by Riz Ortolani (first season), Ennio Morricone (from the second to the seventh season and again on the tenth season), and by Paolo Buonvino (from the eighth to the ninth season).

The show was successfully exported to over eighty countries during and after its sixteen-year run. All ten seasons were released in Australia on DVD with English subtitles by Aztec International Entertainment, having originally aired on the Special Broadcasting Service television channel. It was also broadcast on MHz Networks in the United States. The first three seasons were shown in the UK on Channel 4. The TV drama was successful in the Eastern Bloc, where it appeared on state TV in 1986 and in Albania, Romania, Poland, Czechoslovakia, Hungary, and Bulgaria, where it appeared in the end of the 1980s (in its seventh season, the show featured Bulgarian actor Stefan Danailov). In Portugal, it was re-broadcast by RTP Memória.

La Piovra is considered to be the most famous Italian television series in the world, and all seasons received widespread public approval, with an average of 10 million and a peak of 15 million viewers. The show is recognized for its portrayals of the violence and heartlessness of members of organized crime.

== Synopsis ==
Particularly important to the show is the narrative evolution with which the multiple tentacles of organized crime spread through local and international networks, and this is also the basis of the show's title. The first season moves from localized drug trafficking rings in Sicily to the palaces of power in Rome in the second. The third season tells the story of the Mafia's financial dealings through international banks and the illegal trafficking of weapons and nuclear waste. The plot intensifies in the fourth season, at the end of which the main protagonist, Commissioner Corrado Cattani (played by Michele Placido), is killed due to the increasing knowledge he acquires about the Mafia's vast dealings and criminal operations.

The intricate stories of politics, finance, Freemasonry, corruption, and organized crime which are told in seasons 5 to 7 (1990–1995) were inspired by the political and news stories of those years, and attempted to present the notion that the Mafia was not based on concepts of honour and valour but was rather a harmful societal phenomenon replete with fraud, cold-blooded killers, and a cause of social decay. This fact generated several political controversies as well as strong pressure to put an end to the series. Despite this, the show continued to have great success with the public and with critics, even at the international level.

It was partly due to these political pressures that the 8th and 9th seasons deviated from telling a story set in contemporary times and shifted to the earlier era of the landowner-and-peasant mafia of the 1950s and 1960s, mainly focusing on the private affairs of the protagonists rather than on the business of Cosa Nostra, and the plot was almost entirely detached from the other chapters of the saga.

Finally, with "La piovra 10", the show strived to tie up any loose ends which were previously left pending and to present an updated perspective of the Mafia of the early 2000s.

=== Season one ===
The first season of 6 episodes of 60 minutes each, released in 1984, was directed by Damiano Damiani and scored by Riz Ortolani. The episodes were filmed at locations in Rome and the Sicilian city of Trapani, and the scenes in the mountains and on the lake were shot in Horgen and Lake Geneva, Switzerland.
The main theme of the plot revolves around local arms and drug trafficking, which is investigated by Commissioner Corrado Cattani, played by Michele Placido. Cattani has been transferred from Rome and appointed deputy police chief in a small town in Sicily, after his predecessor, Commissioner Marineo, is killed by the mafia. The commissioner moves with his wife Else (Nicole Jamet), with whom he often has arguments, and his teenage daughter Paola (Cariddi Nardulli). Cattani's investigation interferes with local mafia groups, who try to influence him. A whole range of measures are used to make the commissioner compliant, to no avail. Eventually, Cattani's subordinate, Vice-Commissioner Leo De Maria (Massimo Bonetti), is shot and killed by a mafia henchman in a café. This proves to be one of the most brutal scenes in the whole series. Following this, Corrado continues his investigation, and an unsuccessful attempt is made to assassinate him. Finally, the mafia decides to kidnap his daughter Paola, and this proves to be Cattani's breaking point. Panicked about his daughter's safety, he follows all of the mafia's demands and revokes his previous statements. Paola is later raped by one of the mobsters before being released, and suffers severe trauma. Corrado begins an affair with the young heroin-addicted Raffaella "Titti" Pecci Scialoia (Barbara De Rossi), whose mother was shot together with former police commissioner Marineo. He attempts to help her go clean and get away from her drug dealer Sante Cirinnà (Angelo Infanti), but she also ends up getting killed. Cattani resigns from the police and leaves Sicily, joining his wife Else in a small lakeside town in Switzerland, where Paola is being treated at a psychiatric facility. The season additionally features the powerful architect Olga Camastra (Florinda Bolkan) and the commissioner's primary antagonist, attorney Terrasini (François Périer).
The success of the first season was exceptional, with ratings rising with each successive episode - the first being watched by 8 million Italians and the sixth by 15 million.

=== Season two ===
The second season, again having 6 episodes of 60 minutes each, was released in 1986. The fact that there was a second season at all was controversial, and previous director Damiano Damiani thought it was a mistake to shoot sequels so he withdrew from the project. Screenwriter Ennio De Concini had to be persuaded by producer Sergio Silva to return, and finally Florestano Vancini was hired to direct. Legendary composer Ennio Morricone joined the project and composed the soundtrack. Shooting again took place at several locations in Italy and Switzerland.

In this season, the focus increasingly shifts to the international business dealings of the Sicilian Mafia. The emphasis is on American connections and contacts with the Italian government. The story showcases the intrigues and violent pressure of a secret society called Itala in Sicily. The first two episodes pick up the thread of the first season. The creators of the series decided to remove all characters from the previous season who were no longer necessary to the plotline, and these were killed off or otherwise removed from the story. Corrado Cattani, who had previously left the police force, is persuaded to return and resume work. For this purpose, Colonel Ettore Ferretti (Sergio Fantoni), a connection to Corrado's long-time friend and mentor Sebastiano Cannito (Jacques Dacqmine), makes an appearance. The corrupt Cannito has gained a high position in the Secret Service with the help of the Masonic lodge and is deeply involved in the business of the Mafia, which Ferretti wants to uncover. At the beginning of the story, Corrado's daughter Paola, who was brutalized in the previous season, commits suicide. Cattani decides to search for those responsible for Paola's kidnapping in Sicily. There, however, he runs into a trap and is placed in custody by his nemesis, Attorney Terrasini (François Périer). Cattani is forced to agree to a pact with his foe, and he goes undercover as an assistant to the powerful Cannito; in this role he has to work closely with the people responsible for the death of several of his colleagues. He begins a love affair with Olga Camastra (Florinda Bolkan), who is a member of the Lodge, thereby obtaining information from her about everything that happens within the organization. The Countess, due to her feelings for Cattani, begins to play a double game, even bringing the commissioner into her inner circle so he can obtain the information he needs. As Corrado gets involved in factional battles between the Lodge and the Mafia, he places himself in even greater danger. When his partner Ferreti is killed, Cattani is completely on his own. Only his wife Else, who lives by herself at a lakeside in the Swiss Alps, remains as his conversation partner. By the end of the season, Cattani has enough evidence to help prosecutors file charges against key figures of organized crime. Attorney Terrasini turns out to be the most influential Mafia boss on the island, and with a lot of effort and risk-taking from Cattani, is eventually put behind bars. In the last episode, Else Cattani dies in her husband's arms in an assassination attempt on him.
The second season solidified the success of the production, with an average rating of 15 million viewers per episode in Italy.

=== Season three ===
The third season of La Piovra launched in 1987 and this time had seven episodes. The production style changed somewhat this time around as well. Directing duties passed to Luigi Perelli, who, in contrast to his predecessors Damiano Damiani and Florestano Vancini, had previously mainly worked in television. The screenplay was written by Sandro Petraglia and Stefano Rulli, who would later go on to work together again on the feature film The Stolen Children, among other productions. The season was filmed at Giardini Naxos and Taormina, Sicily, as well as in Milan and in the medieval abbey of San Pietro in Valle in Umbria. The show's ratings in Italy remained high, but started to show a slight downward trend. While an average of 15 million viewers had watched the first two seasons, the third one was watched by an average of 12 million Italian viewers. It was also sold to 77 countries, including the Soviet Union.
In this season, the action moves to Milan. The story exposes the actions of the financial mafia and international money-laundering channels. Corrado Cattani launches an investigation into the largest Italian bank, Antinari, and he meets members of the Antinari family. He falls in love with Giulia (Giuliana De Sio), the daughter of the family patriarch, Carlo Antinari, who runs the bank with his father, Nicola Antinari. Gaetano "Tano" Cariddi (Remo Girone), the most notorious mafia character of the series, initially holds the role of assistant at the Antinari Bank, before becoming its sole owner at the end of the season.

=== Season four ===
Again directed by Luigi Perelli, the fourth season, launched in 1989, proved to be the most successful of the series. It reached an average of over 14 million viewers, a noticeable uptick from the previous season, and the last episode achieved a peak of 17.2 million viewers. The number of episodes returned to 6, but the length of each one was increased from 60 minutes up to nearly 100 minutes. Luigi Perelli was back at the helm of the project, with Petraglia and Rulli once again writing the screenplay. The fourth season was the last one featuring Michele Placido in the lead role of Corrado Cattani. Placido had made the decision to leave the production and return to other projects after five years, as he no longer wished to be associated with the character he had portrayed so successfully. The fate of the beloved commissioner preoccupied the Italian public weeks before the new season's launch, and there was much speculation as to which way the show would end. La Repubblica, one of the largest daily newspapers in Italy, produced several reports on the subject in a single day. After the last episode, speculations arose that Rai had filmed an alternative and more positive ending to the fourth season.
The season begins with Gaetano "Tano" Cariddi expanding his position at Antinari Bank. In order to maintain sole rule, he arranges for Giulia Antinari to drown in a "bathing accident". With this, Tano becomes Corrado Cattani's mortal enemy. Tano's machinations reach their peak as he strategically marries Ester Rasi (Simona Cavallari), daughter of powerful insurance company president Filippo Rasi (Claude Rich), and after realizing that she is actually helping the police, kills her. The investigation into the case of the mysterious murder of a casino owner, Carmelo Tinadari, has been entrusted to a new judge - the legendary Silvia Conti (Patricia Millardet), with whom Cattani initially quarrels, but later has a love affair. What follows is an intense series of dangerous criminal cases with multiple homicides and attempts on Cattani's life. When the Mafia realizes that Conti is unshakeable and will not succumb to corruption, they organize her abduction and rape. Shortly after Ester's death, Cattani is able to uncover all the associates involved in a nuclear waste smuggling business, whose principal organizer is Tano. In the last episode, one morning in the courtyard of a Milan hospital, Cattani is ambushed by multiple gunmen and killed on the spot. Silvia Conti finds his corpse, and vows to avenge him.

=== Season five ===
After Michele Placido's departure, the creators of the series had to solve the difficult task of maintaining continuity with the story, while introducing a new lead actor in a credible manner. They did so by creating the character of Davide Licata (Vittorio Mezzogiorno), a new commissioner with a different, harder look and approach. The plot was also moved back to Sicily. Real economic issues were again used as a story background, with a focus on embezzlement of state funds that were approved for structural projects in Sicily and then disappeared into other channels. Political attacks on the series increased so much after this season that Rai was forced to temporarily stop production (see Reaction in Italy). The season was again helmed by Luigi Perelli, and launched in 1990.

The two main links to the previous story include the judge Silvia Conti, who wants to find the murderers of Corrado Cattani, and head mobster Tano Cariddi, who continues to engage in criminal activities. Davide Licata enters the plot as a police officer who had to flee to the United States in the '70s because he was the last survivor of a police force on the Mafia's hit list. Licata is now recruited by the American police in New York City and smuggled undercover into the immediate vicinity of Sicilian entrepreneur Giovanni Linori (Luigi Pistilli) in Palermo. There, Licata witnesses the downfall of the wealthy Linori family and is dragged into a vortex of violence to which all male family members eventually fall victim. Judge Conti gets involved and interferes with the Mafia's business, so another hit is put on her life. She is saved by Licata, who begins to collaborate with her more actively. Licata discovers that one of the men involved in the murders of his former police unit has withdrawn to a monastery and he decides to pursue this thread. All the while, he has been successfully infiltrating the Linori family and thus indirectly the Mafia as well, until he has gained their trust. He is considered so trustworthy that Cariddi hires him as his chauffeur, not realizing that he is dealing with the successor of his former mortal enemy Corrado Cattani. The action and convoluted criminal dealings take the viewer from the Mafia heartland in Sicily to banking centres in Luxembourg, Switzerland, and Bavaria, all the way to Africa, where the Mafia is conducting clandestine drug and weapons deals. The season ends with Tano, having escaped an attempt on his life by his previous confreres, the Linori family, flees Sicily with his sister, ostensibly for good.

=== Season six ===
The sixth season of La Piovra, filmed in cooperation with Czech Television in Prague, launched in 1992 and was again led by the now-familiar team of Perelli/Petraglia/Rulli. The context this time focused on global connections between crime, politics, and finance, with high-stakes involvement in drug trafficking and the embezzlement of aid for the Third World. A link to the Nazi past is introduced.

The latest season was co-produced by the Austrian broadcasting company ORF, partly due to the addition of Vienna as a new filming location. With this new international dimension to the show, the producers expected to see an increase in international viewership.

New Mafia head Don Amilcare Attilio Brenno (Pierre Mondy) makes his fortune by bribing foreign companies as part of development aid to Africa. Brenno has made his way to the top of the organization with unprecedented brutality, not only killing internal rivals but also targeting those who are seen as meddling from the outside. Davide Licata, back for another season, barely gets away with his life in an assassination attempt ordered by Brenno, and sustains a permanent injury, with a bullet that can no longer be removed from his skull and which causes him violent headaches.

Meanwhile, Tano Cariddi, suffering from severe drug addiction and depression, is located in Dakar, Senegal by Licata and brought back to Italy to act as a key witness against the Mafia. The police leverages Tano's only remaining emotional attachment to his disabled sister Maria as a way to manipulate him. Brenno's henchmen do the same, however, and Maria is brutally raped. Faced with the fate of his badly traumatized sister, Tano is ready to cooperate fully with the authorities. In less than a week, he transforms himself from an opium-dependent bundle of nerves to his erstwhile cold and calculatingly efficient operator. The season continues with various plots and sub-plots, Mafia rivalries and schisms, Turkish drug-running channels, and even a connection with a former Nazi concentration camp supervisor in Czechoslovakia. This latter, played by renowned Czech actor Rudolf Hrušínský in his last major role, escaped the Allied liberation forces at the end of World War II by assuming the identity of a camp prisoner, and later went on to become a wealthy banker using stolen Jewish money. The season closes with Licata and Cariddi luring the banker back to the concentration camp, now a heroin lab. Licata is at this point struggling with his health and only barely manages to overpower the old man, but dies soon after as a consequence of his previous injury.

=== Season seven ===
The seventh season of La Piovra launched in 1995 after a three-year gap, the longest between seasons to date. Vittorio Mezzogiorno had left the show after the previous season, and as the second dead lead protagonist in the series, there were concerns about repeating the same pattern again and thus leading to viewer fatigue. Luigi Perelli again directed, the setting was brought back to Trapani, and Countess Olga Camastra (Florinda Bolkan) reappeared, in order to re-establish continuity with the story of Corrado Cattani, whose life had been cut short at the end of the fourth season. Several new elements were introduced this time around, including connections with the occult Thule Society and the pseudo-Masonic ultra-right Propaganda Due. Viewers and critics responded positively to the seventh season. After seasons 1, 2, and 4, the 7th season won the Italian television award Telegatto for the first time. Ratings continued their slightly declining trend, however, and the show garnered an average of 10.2 million viewers in Italy.
Season 7 essentially follows two storylines: On the one hand, brutal gang warfare is taking place in Trapani involving extortion of protection money, and on the other, a secret fascist society is allied with the Mafia and together they control society from behind the scenes. Additionally, the Masonic lodge is planning to invest huge amounts of money in Russian financial holdings. The link between the two levels of action is Countess Olga Camastra, familiar to viewers of the first two seasons of the show. She was previously romantically linked to Corrado Cattani but later ended up going to jail. After her acquittal, she manages to pursue her business activities all the more successfully, so that she is now counted among the most respected entrepreneurs in Sicily. The plot begins with the murder of Rosario Granchio, a Sicilian criminal from the immediate vicinity of Don Nazzareno "Nuzzo" Marciano (Stefan Danailov), the local mafia boss who controls a large part of the protection funds in Palermo. In order to solve the murder, Silvia Conti (Patricia Millardet) is transferred to Sicily, where she meets the same distrust as Corrado Cattani once did. The young vice-commissioner Gianni Breda (Raoul Bova) becomes her supporter and assistant. Marciano's behaviour, which is becoming increasingly brutal, is initially difficult for Conti and Breda to understand. Sara (Romina Mondello), the young daughter of the murdered Rosario Granchio, plays a central role in this. She is moved into Nuzzo's house to ensure her silence. But after her fiancé dies too, she decides to take revenge and shoots Nuzzo's little nephew and his mother. Various intrigues among the dons and mafiosi ensue, embroiling high-profile business people such as Olga Camastra, judge Conti, and the police. Conti's investigation ruffles feathers and the Mafia use their influence to have her transferred to a UN post, which she refuses. As the noose begins to tighten around Camastra, both from the side of the mobsters and Conti's investigation, it is revealed that it was the countess who ordered the assassination of Cattani, partly due to instructions she herself received, and partly due to their unsuccessful love affair. She is eventually jailed again, and dies in her cell, killed by a mob henchman.

=== Season eight ===
The eighth season of La Piovra, which was released in 1997, was a radical departure from the previous seven. The new director, Giacomo Battiato, took the show in a new direction, returning to the origins of the Sicilian mafia in the 1950s in a prequel to the action of previous seasons. This new plot line would continue into the ninth season, which was set in the 1960s. Season eight contained only two episodes, a trend which would continue for the remainder of the long-running series. Audience response was generally positive, and the show won several international prizes. The number of viewers was 7.5 million and 8.8 million viewers respectively, and at 100 minutes each, the episodes of the eighth and ninth seasons were the longest in the series to date. New screenwriters were hired as well, with Alessandro Sermoneta and Mimmo Rafele joining the project. The only personal connection to previous seasons was the story of the young Tano Cariddi (Primo Reggiani) and his sister Maria (Ana Torrent). The male lead role was played by Raoul Bova as Carabiniere Carlo Arcuti. The choice was unusual in that Bova had appeared as young commissioner Gianni Breda in season seven (40 years later in the series). Other actors from previous seasons also reappeared, most notably Renato Mori, once in the role of Vice-Commissioner Giuseppe Altero, partner to Corrado Cattani, now as the aging mafia boss Don Calogero Albanese. The actor Tony Sperandeo on the other hand, did not change sides: previously killer Santino Rocchi in season six, now mafia henchman Turi Mondello. The female leading role of Baroness Barbara Greenberg Altamura was given to German actress Anja Kling.

The story begins with a brutal power struggle within the local mafia of a small Sicilian town. The power-hungry Pietro Favignana (Luca Zingaretti) kills the aging Don Albanese and rapes his daughter Rosario (Daniela "Mietta" Miglietta), forces her to marry him, and thus becomes the new mob boss. Favignana then goes head to head with the leader of a planned development project, Baron Francesco Altamura (Claudio Gora), who refuses to allow the Mafia to get involved in the deal. In order to blackmail him and his wife Baroness Barbara Greenberg Altamura (Anja Kling), Favignana kidnaps their son Paul and has the young Tano "Tanuzzo" Cariddi guard him on an abandoned estate. With the help of the German consulate and the undercover police captain Carlo Arcuti, the boy is rescued and the entire Favignana gang arrested. Favignana himself escapes to New York, however, where he hones his drug-smuggling skills. His accomplices in Sicily receive light sentences and the boss soon returns home. With unprecedented brutality, Favignana sets out to bring the region back under his control. Opponents and employees suspected of cooperation with the state are liquidated. Baron Altamura, facing increased pressure to comply with the Mafia, eventually capitulates and agrees to make a deal with Favignana. During this time, the Baroness has been having an affair with the young Arcuti. During Favignana's trial, the truth about their relationship is revealed and the captain is recalled to Rome to face an official investigation. The Baroness feels compelled to continue living with her husband Francesco for the good of their child, knowing that he had commissioned a failed assassination attempt against her lover Arcuti. When Rosaria Favignana learns from Tano that her father Don Albanese was forced to commit suicide by her husband, she stabs Pietro in front of the courthouse, killing him. Finally, eager to learn and grow, Tano convinces Francesco Altamura to send him to a prestigious school and look after his half-sister Maria; in a season-finale twist, it is revealed that her father was Pietro Favignana himself.

=== Season nine ===
The ninth season of La Piovra, released in 1998, was a continuation of the eighth. The director was Giacomo Battiato again, and the script was written by Andrea Porporati, Mimmo Rafele, and Alessandro Sermoneta. The season contained two episodes, at 100 minutes each.
A few years after Barbara Altamura was questioned in court about her relationship with police captain Carlo Arcuti, she returns from a psychiatric clinic to her husband, Baron Francesco Altamura. A lot has changed during her absence, however. The couple's country villa has been sold and the Altamuras now live in the city. The baron has founded a "bank for development", which is to be used for laundering of drug money. Francesco Altamura's house is run by his lover, who is officially introduced as his "cousin". The baroness lives in the house like a prisoner. Carlo Arcuti is again recruited to investigate the drug trade in Sicily, and he and the baroness begin seeing each other romantically once more. Barbara helps the police in their efforts to uncover the criminal dealings that her husband is involved in but her spying is uncovered by the new regional mob boss, lawyer Torrisi (Sebastiano Lo Monaco). Events take a surprising turn, as the baron tries to get rid of his wife with the help of his "cousin". An accident is staged, and later two charred bodies are found in a burned-out car wreck at the foot of a mountain. The police assume that it is Baron and Baroness Altamura. In reality, Barbara is rescued by the lovestruck mafioso Turi Mondello (Tony Sperandeo), who then holds her captive. The bodies from the crash are later identified as being Francesco Altamura and his lover. A violent power struggle develops between Mondello and Torrisi, with Mondello eventually coming out triumphant after a bloody massacre at a wedding party. Arcuti manages to free the baroness and put Mondello behind bars, but he doesn't survive his success for long, as a hit is put out on him and he is crushed to death by an automobile. The local judiciary closes the investigation against the Mafia despite overwhelming evidence but a young judicial assessor, witnessing the investigator's cowardly retreat, promises Barbara Altamura that he will continue Carlo Arcuti's work.

=== Season ten ===
Season 10, which appeared in 2001, picked up from the end of season 7 and completed the series. After the 8th and 9th seasons, it was initially unclear whether another one would be made. Producer Sergio Silva spoke of a "creative crisis". It turned out that it was difficult to pick up the thread again after the flashback to the 50s and 60s, while maintaining continuity within the series. There was also some amount of political resistance to the continuation of the show, and the final season of La Piovra lost its pride of place on Rai's premier channel Rai Uno by being relegated to secondary sister channel Rai Due. The number of viewers, at around 4 million, remained below the usual average. Luigi Perelli returned to direct the final chapter of the series, and the screenplay was written by producer Sergio Silva, with Mimmo Rafele and Piero Bodrato; the soundtrack was again composed by Ennio Morricone.

The season begins with Professor Ottavio Ramonte (Rolf Hoppe), head of the Mafia-affiliated Thule secret society, being acquitted on appeal. Investigative judge Silvia Conti (Patricia Millardet) watches Ramonte giving his first television interview on the steps of the courthouse, in which he openly threatens his enemies. Conti, who had put Ramonte behind bars in the seventh season, is meanwhile withdrawing from political work. She is married, wants to adopt a daughter, and has just applied for a transfer to the juvenile court. Ramonte does not hesitate for a moment to take his place at the head of the Thule organization again. For this he needs Tano Cariddi, however, who lives in a castle ruin on Mount Etna. Cariddi begins to position himself to take over the organization by slowly poisoning Ramonte with arsenic. Tano soon becomes the leader of Thule, a position of unprecedented power. Giulia Mercuri (Elena Arvigo), daughter of Thule's chief financial officer, finds out about her father's criminal dealings and about Ramonte's involvement in Corrado Cattani's murder, and she reveals this to Silvia Conti. Giulia is kidnapped and held in Tano's custody to silence her and blackmail her father. Conti, against the advice of her husband and her superiors, decides to get involved once more and begins to investigate. As she delves deeper into the case, and as the criminal dealings of Cariddi continue, Conti barely survives an assassination attempt against her. Tano becomes gradually more delusional and he begins to imagine that Mercuri is his ex-wife Ester, whom he strangled in season four. In his madness, Tano tries to strangle Mercuri but fails. In the end, as Conti closes in on the archvillain, Tano sees no way out, so he drives to the top of the volcano and enters the crater holding a disc which contains a complete database of his criminal organization and business holdings. He waves to Conti one last time, and the show ends.

== Filming and reaction ==
The last scene in season 4, in which the Mafia kills Commissioner Cattani, generated an incredible number of reactions from all over the world. A mysterious letter was allegedly sent from the US, in which an unnamed billionaire offered several million dollars to the creators of the show to film more episodes. Michele Placido had already turned down the role at that point. Audiences continued asking for more, so the filmmakers decided to make another season. Without Placido, however, the show was a commercial disappointment. Despite this, six more seasons were filmed. After the launch of the first season, the filmmakers and Placido himself received threatening letters from the Mafia to stop filming immediately. For security reasons, the second season was filmed mainly in secret locations outside Italy, including in Germany, Switzerland, Britain, and Greece.

=== Reaction in Italy ===
The series, whose first episode was screened on 11 March 1984, triggered intensive journalistic examination of the phenomenon of the Mafia. Several outlets published cover stories on the topic. The discussion engendered by the show included widows of murdered police officers and bankers from Palermo. Comparable programs were also shown in connection with later seasons, and these continued to be accompanied by great national interest. One of the debates centered around whether the series glorified the mafia or whether it contributed to Italians no longer accepting organized crime as a normal part of life. An analysis of audience ratings during season 4 was revealing. Viewership and audience response in the south, the actual area of origin of the Mafia, was lowest, at only 12%. The largest group of viewers was demographically similar to the figure of Corrado Cattani himself: "a man of average age from the big cities of northwestern Italy", especially Milan and Turin.

Political reactions and criticism were rife as well, and though several politicians praised the show for the way it exposed the Mafia's connections to Italian politics and the corridors of power, critical voices were vocal in their opposition to the storyline. Conservative politician Silvio Berlusconi and others from Forza Italia as well as representatives from Democrazia Cristiana claimed that shows like La Piovra were responsible for "Italy's negative image abroad" and demanded that it cease filming. DC officials argued that the South was being criminalized, that the State was being depicted as a loser, and that public confidence in government institutions was being undermined. Due partly to this type of pressure, production work on the 5th and 6th seasons was temporarily halted.

After the 7th season, political controversy came to a head again. Seven Sicilian bishops protested what they perceived as discrimination against Sicily. Luigi Perelli replied that a culture of silence would benefit no one.

Clashes before the broadcast of the 10th and last season reached a new climax. The cause of the conflict was an interview with leading actor Remo Girone, who explicitly made a connection between the final season's plotline, in which the boss of a secret criminal organization is acquitted of his crimes, and the pressure exerted in Italy on judges in mafia trials.

In 2009, during his party's youth convention in the city of Olbia, former Italian Prime Minister Silvio Berlusconi lashed out at authors of books and films about the mafia, saying that if he found out who the author of La Piovra was, he would strangle them. It is worth noting that Berlusconi himself has been investigated for Mafia ties, and in 2012, he was sentenced to 4 years in prison for tax fraud.

== Seasons ==
The following ten seasons of La Piovra were produced by:

Season	Year	Title	Episodes	Director
1	1984	La piovra	6	Damiano Damiani
2	1986	La piovra 2	6	Florestano Vancini
3	1987	La piovra 3	7	Luigi Perelli
4	1989	La piovra 4	6	Luigi Perelli
5	1990	La piovra 5 - Il cuore del problema (The heart of the problem)	5	Luigi Perelli
6	1992	La piovra 6 - L'ultimo segreto (The final secret)	6	Luigi Perelli
7	1995	La piovra 7 - Indagine sulla morte del commissario Cattani (Investigation of the death of Commissioner Cattani)	6	Luigi Perelli
8	1997	La piovra 8 - Lo scandalo (The scandal)	2	Giacomo Battiato
9	1998	La piovra 9 - Il patto (The deal)	2	Giacomo Battiato
10	2001	La piovra 10	2	Luigi Perelli

== Cast and characters ==
- Michele Placido as Corrado Cattani
- Patricia Millardet as Silvia Conti
- Remo Girone as Gaetano "Tano" Cariddi (inspired by the real-life mafioso Michele Sindona)
- Raoul Bova as Gianni Breda (season 7) and Carlo Arcuti (seasons 8 and 9)
- Vittorio Mezzogiorno as Davide Licata / David Licata/ Davide Pardi
- Martin Balsam as Frank Carrisi
- Florinda Bolkan as Countess Olga Camastra
- Daniela "Mietta" Miglietta as Rosaria Albanese
- Luca Zingaretti as Pietro Favignana
- Claude Rich as Filippo Rasi
- Jean-Luc Bideau as Davide Faeti
- François Marthouret as Senator Ernesto Conti
- Barbara De Rossi as Marchesa Raffaella "Titti" Pecci Scialoia
- François Périer as Attorney Terrasini
- Angelo Infanti as Sante Cirinnà
- Pino Colizzi as Nanni Santamaria
- Paul Guers as Professor Gianfranco Laudeo
- Renato Mori as Giuseppe Altero
- Massimo Bonetti as Leo De Maria
- Jacques Dacqmine as Professor Sebastiano Cannito
- Geoffrey Copleston as Alfredo Ravanusa
- Flavio Bucci as Don Manfredi Santamaria
- Michele Abruzzo as Ruggiero
- Renato Cecchetto as Achille Bordonaro
- Vittorio Duse as Professor Cristina
- Sergio Fantoni as Colonel Ettore Ferretti
- Daniel Ceccaldi as Dr. Nicola Sorbi
- Lara Wendel as Ellis Sorbi
- Victor Cavallo as Alvaro Maurilli
- Al Cliver as Pierluigi Conti
- Dagmar Lassander as Manuela Cannito
- Cesare Barbetti as Reporter
- Tony Sperandeo as Ravanusa's Secretary
- Carlo Reali as Diletti
- Giuliana De Sio as Giulia Antinari
- Alain Cuny as Nicola Antinari
- Marie Laforêt as Anna Antinari
- Luigi De Filippo as Venturi
- Francisco Rabal as Abate Lovani
- Pierre Vaneck as Carlo Antinari
- Lino Capolicchio as Professor Mattinera
- Adalberto Maria Merli as Dino Alessi
- Giampiero Albertini as Senator Tarsoni
- Nicola Di Pinto as Brother Bernardo
- Simona Cavallari as Ester Rasi Cariddi
- Mario Adorf as Salvatore Frolo
- Bruno Cremer as Antonio Espinosa
- Adriano Pappalardo as Santuzzo Salieri
- Vanessa Gravina as Lorella De Pisis / Paola Frolo
- Luigi Diberti as Senator Ettore Salimbeni
- Pietro Biondi as Falisci
- Vittorio Amandola as Man at abandoned factory
- Nello Pazzafini as Girgenti
- Vittorio Duse as Sicilian Magistrat
- Elio Zamuto as Santelia
- Marino Masè as Consigliere Federico Canopio
- Luigi Pistilli as Giovanni Linori
- Ray Lovelock as Simon Barth
- Agnese Nano as Gloria Linori
- Vanni Corbellini as Andrea Linori
- Claudine Auger as Matilde Linori
- Orazio Orlando as Annibale Corvo
- Orso Maria Guerrini as Giuseppe Carta
- Delia Boccardo as Marta
- Riccardo Cucciolla as Riccardo Respighi
- Ana Torrent as Maria Favignana Cariddi
- Gottfried John as Friar Gillo / Dante Saverio Filò
- Stefano Dionisi as Stefano Pardi
- John Francis Lane as Prosecutor
- Xavier Deluc as Lorenzo Ribeira
- Pierre Mondy as Don Amilcare Attilio Brenno
- Beatrice Macola as Agent Fede
- Ivano Marescotti as Bellini
- Tony Sperandeo as Santino Rocchi
- Glauco Onorato as Father Matteo
- Rudolf Hrušínský as Stefan Litvak
- Angela Goodwin as Mrs. Canevari
- Siegfried Lowitz as Milos Danick
- Pier Paolo Capponi as Chief Procurator of Milan
- Martin Dejdar Czech Police Agent
- Ennio Fantastichini as Saverio Bronta
- Lorenza Indovina as Chiara Bronta
- Renato De Carmine as Renato Rannisi
- Alfredo Pea as Mario Altofonte
- Anita Zagaria as Giulia Altofonte
- Romina Mondello as Sara Granchio
- Francesco Benigno as Biagio Granchio
- Stefan Danailov as Don Nazzareno "Nuzzo" Marciano
- Gedeon Burkhard as Daniele Rannisi
- Sergio Fiorentini as Procurator Michele Orione
- Giancarlo Prete as Lucio Panarea
- Rolf Hoppe as Professor Ottavio Ramonte
- Lucia Sardo as Mrs. Granchio
- Natasha Hovey as Tiziana Breda
- Francesco Prando as Bodyguard
- Paolo Bonacelli as Edoardo Corinto
- Roberto Herlitzka as Ninni Paradiso
- Roberto Nobile as Police Superintendent
- Anja Kling as Baroness Barbara Greenberg Altamura
- Claudio Gora as Baron Francesco Altamura
- Renato Mori as Don Calogero Albanese
- Primo Reggiani as Young Tano Cariddi
- Ramona Badescu as Maria Cariddi
- Tony Sperandeo as Turi Mondello
- Sebastiano Lo Monaco as lawyer Torrisi
- Luigi Maria Burruano as Favignana's Lawyer
- Giovanni Esposito as Henchman

== Soundtracks ==
- La Piovra 2–5 (Ennio Morricone)

== Awards ==
- Telegatto, Italy, for Best Italian TV Series in 1984 (Season 1), 1986 (Season 2), 1989 (Season 4), and 1995 (Season 7).
- Golden Gong, Germany, for Damiano Damiani as best director and Michele Placido as best actor in 1984 (Season 1).
- Golden Nymph and International TV Critics' Award, Monte-Carlo Television Festival, 1998 (Season 8).
