= Where Are You? I'm Here =

1993 Italian film

- Directed by: Liliana Cavani
- Written by: Liliana Cavani; Italo Moscati
- Produced by: Giovanni Bertolucci
- Starring: Chiara Caselli; Gaetano Carotenuto
- Cinematography: Armando Nannuzzi
- Edited by: Angelo Nicolini
- Music by: Pino Donaggio
- Production companies: San Francisco Film; RAI; Sacis
- Distributed by: I.I.F.; Sacis
- Release date: 1993
- Running time: 108
- Country: Italy
- Language: Italian

Where Are You? I'm Here (Italian: Dove siete? Io sono qui) is an Italian drama film directed by Liliana Cavani. It was screened at the 50th Venice International Film Festival, where Anna Bonaiuto was awarded as best supporting actress.

== Plot ==
Fausto is deaf and works for a financial company in Rome. His controlling mother has always refused to accept the fact that her child is deaf and never sent him to a special school where he can learn sign language. His aunt, though, teaches him to communicate and helps him find a place among the Deaf community in Rome. He meets and falls in love with Elena, a schoolgirl who has a love of poetry, but who has struggled to stay in formal education owing to a lack of provisions for deaf students. To Fausto's mother's concern, the two find love with each other until a set of difficulties ensue.

== Cast ==
- Chiara Caselli as Elena Setti
- Gaetano Carotenuto as Fausto
- Anna Bonaiuto as Fausto's mother
- Giuseppe Perruccio as Fausto's father
- Valeria D'Obici as Fausto's aunt
- Ines Nobili as Maria
- Ko Muroboshi as the mime
- Doriana Chierici as Elena's mother
- Carla Cassola as Miss Martini
- Paola Mannoni as the principal
- Pino Micol as the bank manager
- Sebastiano Lo Monaco as Professor Pini
- Paco Reconti as Ugo
- Marzio Honorato as the history teacher

== Awards ==
- Volpi Cup for Best Supporting Actress Anna Bonaiuto
- Nastro d'Argento for Best Actress Chiara Caselli
- Grolla d'oro for Chiara Caselli and Gaetano Carotenuto
