= Sebastiano Lo Monaco (actor) =

Italian actor (1958–2023)

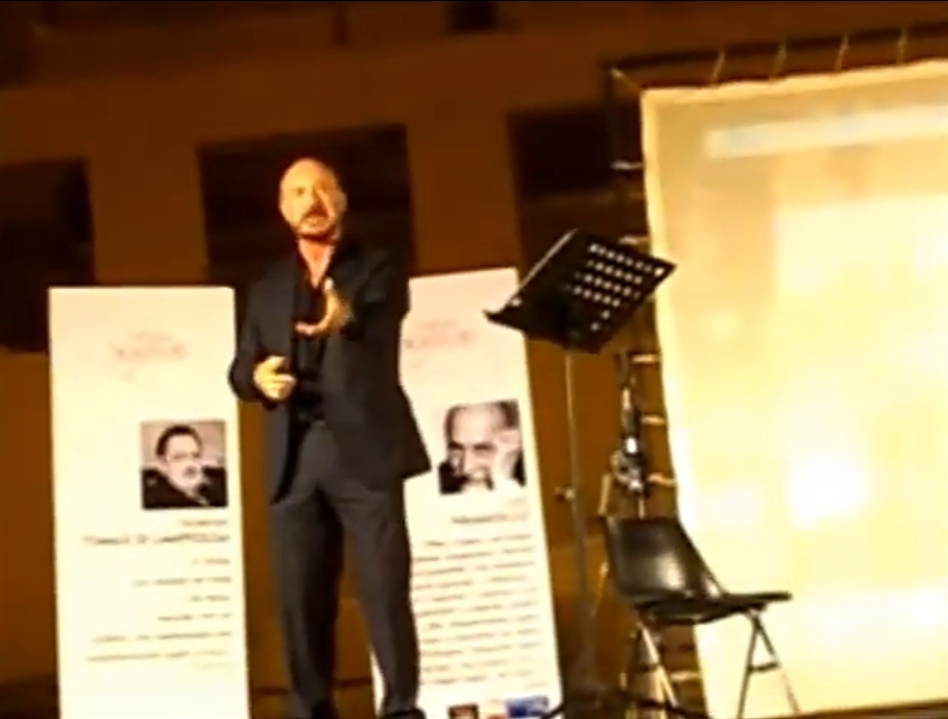
- Lo Monaco in 2014
- Born: 18 September 1958; Floridia, Sicily, Italy
- Died: 16 December 2023 (aged 65); Rome, Lazio, Italy
- Occupation: Actor
- Height: 1.82 m (6 ft 0 in)

Sebastiano Lo Monaco (18 September 1958 – 16 December 2023) was an Italian actor of theatre, film, and television.

== Career ==
Sebastiano Lo Monaco was born in Floridia, Sicily. He attended the Silvio d'Amico National Academy of Dramatic Arts and, in 1989, he became "capocomico" and artistic director. With his theater company, he produced several theatrical plays, like Henry IV, Right You Are (if you think so), Il berretto a sonagli, Tonight We Improvise, Six Characters in Search of an Author, Non si sa come by Luigi Pirandello, Cyrano de Bergerac by Edmond Rostand, A View from the Bridge by Arthur Miller, Othello by William Shakespeare, Non è vero... ma ci credo by Peppino De Filippo, Iphigenia in Aulis by Euripides and Per non morire di mafia by Pietro Grasso, where he was always the protagonist. From May 2000 to March 2004, he was the artistic director of the Vittorio Emanuele II Theatre in Messina.

Lo Monaco also appeared in a lot of films and television series, like Festa di laurea, I Vicerè, Dove siete? Io sono qui, Body Guards, Gli angeli di Borsellino, Joe Petrosino (as Vito Cascio Ferro), A Violent Life, La piovra 8 and 9 (as Lawyer Torrisi), and L'onore e il rispetto (as Lawyer Vasile).

Sebastiano Lo Monaco died on 16 December 2023, at the age of 65.

== Filmography ==
=== Film ===
- Petomaniac (1983)
- Graduation Party (1985)
- Spogliando Valeria (1989)
- Panama Sugar (1990)
- Body Puzzle (1992)
- Where Are You? I'm Here (1993)
- Prima del tramonto (1999)
- Maestrale (2000)
- Body Guards (2000)
- Gli angeli di Borsellino (2003)
- Se sarà luce sarà bellissimo - Moro: Un'altra storia (2004)
- I Vicerè (2007)
- Baarìa (2009)
- Io, Don Giovanni (2009)
- La vita è una cosa meravigliosa (2010)
- Napoletans (2011)
- Lilith's Hell (2015)

=== Television ===
- Vita di Antonio Gramsci (1981)
- A Violent Life (1990)
- La piovra, season 8 (1997)
- Un prete tra noi (1997)
- La piovra, season 9 (1998)
- Sarò il tuo giudice (2001)
- Storia di guerra e d'amicizia (2002)
- Don Matteo (2004)
- Joe Petrosino (2006)
- L'onore e il rispetto (2009)
- Saint Philip Neri: I Prefer Heaven (2010)
- Il delitto di Via Poma (2011)

== See also ==
- Alumni of the Accademia Nazionale di Arte Drammatica Silvio D'Amico
