= Daniele Raffaeli =

Italian voice actor (born 1977)

- Born: 5 April 1977 (age 49); Rome, Italy
- Occupation: Voice actor
- Children: Francesco Raffaeli

Daniele Raffaeli (born 5 April 1977) is an Italian voice actor.

Raffaeli provided the voice of the main protagonist Ben Tennyson in the Italian-language versions of Ben 10, Ben 10: Alien Force, Ben 10: Ultimate Alien, and Ben 10: Omniverse. He also provided the voice of Chuck Bass in the Italian-language version of the teen drama series Gossip Girl.

Raffaeli was born in Rome. He works at Sefit - CDC, Dubbing Brothers, C.D. Cine Dubbing, and other dubbing studios in Italy.

== Voice work ==
=== Animation ===
- Nedeb in Gli Smile and Go e il braciere di fuoco
- Melvo in La Pallastrike sull'isola di Pasqua
- Max in Teen Days
- Leo in Ulysses - My Name Is Nobody (Ulisse - Il mio nome è nessuno)
- Ali in Gladiatori - Il Torneo delle Sette Meraviglie
- Phil in Acid Space
- Alfredo and Igor in 44 Cats
- Mr. Dudu in Super Spike Ball

==== Dubbing ====
- Levi Ackerman in Attack on Titan
- Ben Tennyson and Upgrade in Ben 10
- Ben Tennyson, Albedo, and Swampfire in Ben 10: Alien Force
- Ben Tennyson, 10-year-old Ben, Albedo, Nanomech, Swampfire, and Ultimate Swampfire in Ben 10: Ultimate Alien
- Ben Tennyson in Ben 10: Secret of the Omnitrix
- Gizmo (Second voice) in Teen Titans
- Harold Berman in Hey Arnold!, Hey Arnold!: The Movie
- Noboru Terao in Voices of a Distant Star
- Ginta Toramizu in MÄR
- Comet in Space Chimps
- Abnermal in Garfield's Pet Force
- Bobby Hill in King of the Hill
- Natsume Hyuuga in Alice Academy
- Noah Nixon in Generator Rex
- Chad Dickson/Numbuh 274 in Codename: Kids Next Door
- Ace Bunny in Loonatics Unleashed
- Woo the Wise in Hero: 108
- Yamato Delgado in Battle B-Daman
- Benjamin Martin in Spaced Out
- Brett in Team Galaxy
- Wade Load in Kim Possible (second voice), Kim Possible: A Sitch in Time, Kim Possible Movie: So the Drama
- Chester McBadbat (Seasons 4–5) in The Fairly OddParents
- Dragon in Miss Spider's Sunny Patch Friends
- Scamp (Speaking voice) in Lady and the Tramp II: Scamp's Adventure
- Vincent in Flatmania
- Katz Kobayashi in Mobile Suit Zeta Gundam
- Kaytoo in Eliot Kid
- Gene Belcher in Bob's Burgers
- Davey Hunkerhoff in The Replacements
- Max Kirrin in Famous 5: On the Case
- Erik in Di-Gata Defenders
- Myron in Wayside
- Kai in Ninjago
- Macky in Friends and Heroes
- Oburi in A Kite
- Lenny Carrot in VeggieTales
- Shinji Ikari in Neon Genesis Evangelion, Evangelion: Death and Rebirth, The End of Evangelion
- Kakeru Sakamaki in Idaten Jump
- Bouncing Boy in Legion of Super Heroes
- Rinpun and Kojin in Magic User's Club
- Amiboshi and Suboshi in Fushigi Yûgi
- Tang in Shaolin Wuzang
- Mookie in Baby Felix
- Nike in Mahōjin Guru Guru, Doki Doki Densetsu Mahōjin Guru Guru
- Dortin in Sorcerous Stabber Orphen
- Hokuto Kusanagi in Gear Fighter Dendoh
- Saisuke in Shuriken School
- Jun Aoi in Martian Successor Nadesico
- Masato Iwai in Gals!
- Shinpachi Shimura in Gin Tama
- Edwin "Meat" Kapinski in Sym-Bionic Titan
- Gehl in Wolf's Rain
- Rex in Pop Pixie
- Lightning in Total Drama: Revenge of the Island
- Julio in Spike Team
- Luca in Teen Days
- Kid Flash in Young Justice
- Kanba Takakura and Penguin 1 in Mawaru Penguindrum
- Dera in Daemons of the Shadow Realm

=== Live action Italian dubbing ===
- Thiago Bedoya Agüero in Casi Ángeles
- Joe Scott (young) in Flashbacks of a Fool
- Chuck Bass in Gossip Girl
- Goku in Dragonball Evolution
- Ukataka in Naruto Shippuden
- Travis Apple in You Wish
- Marco Del Rossi in Degrassi: The Next Generation
- Michael Jordan in Space Jam
- Kimo in Haven
- Max Collins in Vanished
- Tao (Seasons 2–3) in BeastMaster
- Corporal Walt Hasser in Generation Kill
- Mark in Kyle XY
- Ethan Craft in Lizzie McGuire
- Kwan in Thunderstone
- Cyrus in The Ex List
- JB Deekes in The Elephant Princess
- Anthony in Falling Skies
- Ralph Owen in Holly's Heroes
- Russell "Russ" Skinner in Wicked Science
- Spike Bannon in My Spy Family
- Scurvy in The Giblet Boys
- Oliver Martin in Unser Charly
- Charley Prince in Blue Water High
- Timo in Gegen den Wind
- Martin Staunton in Foreign Exchange
