= La Piovra (soundtrack) =

Soundtrack album by Ennio Morricone
- Released: 1990
- Recorded: 1985–1990
- Genre: Television score
- Label: Fonit Cetra
- Producer: Ennio Morricone

La Piovra (1990) is the soundtrack album to the Italian television miniseries La Piovra. The music was composed by Ennio Morricone, who scored the La Piovra series starting in its second season, from 1986.

In 1990, Fonit Cetra released La Piotra (LPX 263) in Italy, an LP with 2 selections from the show's third season; 9 from the fourth season; and 4 from the fifth season. It also released a CD version (CDL 263), incorporating additional music from the second season which had previously been released in France by General Music on an LP called La Mafia 2.

== Track listing ==
1. My Heart And I (featuring Amii Stewart) (5:10)
2. Giustizia (2:42)
3. Arresto (2:33)
4. Nel Covo (2:14)
5. Intimamente (featuring Edda Dell'Orso) (3:16)
6. Morte Di Un Giusto (2:04)
7. Contro Tutti (2:38)
8. Strana Bambina (featuring Edda Dell'Orso) (3:54)
9. Una Pietra Sopra (3:22)
10. Stazione Di Palermo (2:30)
11. Per An-na (2:27)
12. Esther (4:00)
13. Troppo Tardi (3:22)
14. Concentrazione (3:19)
15. Silenzi Dopo Silenzi (3:28)
16. Morte Di Un Giusto (2:35)
