= Gli angeli di Borsellino =

- Directed by: Rocco Cesareo
- Written by: Ugo Barbàra, Paolo Zucca, Mirco Da Lio e Massimo Di Martino
- Starring: Brigitta Boccoli; Toni Garrani; Pino Insegno; Benedicta Boccoli
- Release date: 2003
- Running time: 85 mins.
- Country: Italy
- Language: Italian

The Angels of Borsellino (Italian: Gli angeli di Borsellino) is a 2003 Italian film written by Ugo Barbàra, Paolo Zucca, Mirco Da Lio, and Massimo Di Martino, and directed by Rocco Cesareo. The film concerns the lives of the Sicilian judges Giovanni Falcone and Paolo Borsellino.

== Plot ==
Emanuela is a police bodyguard in charge of escorting judge Paolo Borsellino. In the film she speaks about her work and her fears during the 57 days (13 May to 19 July 1992) between the murder of Giovanni Falcone, and that of Borsellino.

== Cast ==
- Brigitta Boccoli: Emanuela Loi
- Benedicta Boccoli: Emanuela's sister
- Toni Garrani: Paolo Borsellino
- Pino Insegno: Agostino Catalano
- Alessandro Prete: Eddie Cosina
- Vincenzo Ferrera: Vincenzo Li Muli
- Cristiano Morroni: Claudio Traina
- Francesco Guzzo: Antonio Vullo
- Sebastiano Lo Monaco: Chief inspector
- Ernesto Mahieux: Vincenzi
