= 44 Cats =

- Created by: Iginio Straffi
- Voices of: Federico Campaiola; Gea Riva; Joy Saltarelli; Francesco Falco; Michela Alborghetti; Francesco Prando
- Country of origin: Italy
- Original languages: Italian; English
- No. of seasons: 2
- No. of episodes: 89

Production
- Running time: 11-22 minutes
- Production companies: Rainbow S.p.A. (Viacom); Antoniano; Rai Ragazzi

Original release
- Network: Rai YoYo; Nick Jr. Italy
- Release: 12 November 2018 – 7 February 2021

44 Cats (Italian: 44 Gatti) is an Italian animated children's television series created by Iginio Straffi. The series is mainly produced by the Rainbow studio, which was co-owned by Viacom at the time of the show's premiere. Viacom's Nickelodeon channels broadcast 44 Cats worldwide, while both RAI's YoYo network and Nickelodeon Italy air the series in Italy. The series follows the adventures of four kittens - Lampo, Meatball, Milady and Pilou - who are part of a musical group called the Buffycats. The series premiered on Rai YoYo in Italy on 12 November 2018.

The series was inspired by a song from the 1968 Zecchino d'Oro competition called "Quarantaquattro gatti".

The series was renewed for a second season, which began airing in Italy in March 2020. It aired internationally later in the year.

A spin-off series titled The Kitty Daycare began airing on YouTube in 2026.

== Characters ==
=== Main ===
- Lampo (voiced by Federico Campaiola in Italian and Sarah Natochenny in English, singing by Elisabeth Tsong) is the lead singer and guitarist of the Buffycats. He is a tabby cat with a blue lightning bolt symbol over his right eye. Lampo's whiskers act like a compass, guiding him to where he needs to go. Although not explicitly stated, it is heavily implied in the episode "Sir Archibald, Gentlecat" that Lampo would be part of a noble family, as his uncle Archibald holds the title "Sir" (Sir Archibald), a title given mainly in European monarchies to barons and knights, implying that he (Sir Archibald) would be a baron or knight.
- Milady (voiced by Gea Riva in Italian and Suzy Myers in English, singing by Natalie Rarick) is the Buffycats' bassist. Her fur turns pink whenever someone tells a lie.
- Pilou (voiced by Joy Saltarelli in Italian and Simona Berman in English, singing by Piccola Coro) is the Buffycats' drummer. She uses her enchanting wide eyes to distract the show's villains.
- Meatball (voiced by Francesco Falco in Italian and Erica Schroeder in English, singing by Samuel Vincent) is the Buffycats' keyboardist. He has a big appetite and can sense danger.
- Granny Pina (voiced by Michela Alborghetti in Italian and Marca Leigh in English) is the human owner of an old house where the Buffycats live. She cooks the pasta that gives the Buffycats their special powers.
- Winston (voiced by Francesco Prando in Italian and Scottie Ray in English) is Granny Pina's wealthy neighbor who is Boss's owner. He lives in a luxurious villa and despises both the Buffycats and their unsightly house, which he is constantly trying to have torn down, never with any success since the Buffycats always thwart his schemes.
- Isotta is Granny Pina's granddaughter, who appears in season two. She is the only human who can understand the cats' language and she often helps the Buffycats.

=== Supporting ===
- Charlie (voiced by Clay Westman in English) is the Buffycat's stage frightened announcer and hype man. He first appears in season 2, episode 29.
- Boss (voiced by Henry F. Benjamin in English) is Winston's pet cat. He is the only cat that Winston likes and is a bullying tomcat who always tries to trick the Buffycats, but they always outsmart him.
- Blister and Scab (both voiced by Marc Thompson in English) are two cats closely linked to Boss. Blister is the tall white and blue thin cat, while Scab is the small grey fat cat.
- The Boom-Boom Steppers:
  - Fancy Dancey (voiced by Marc Thompson in English) is the leader of the Boom-Boom Steppers. He has grey fur and wears a hat that resembles a Mexican charro hat.
  - Lola (voiced by Ilaria Georgino in Italian and Alyson Leigh Rosenfeld in English) is the second Boom-Boom Stepper. She is a white cat with a princess outfit. Towards the end of season one, She becomes a mother in "Pilou the Kitten Sitter".
  - Hope (voiced by Elena Guiliano in Italian and Haven Paschall in English) is Lola's daughter. Her first word was "Pilou" because she was the one who "cat-sitted" her before she brought her back to her mom.
  - Jumpy (voiced by Lisa Ortiz in English) is the third Boom-Boom Stepper.
- Cosmo (voiced by Eddy Lee) is an astronaut cat who is a good friend of the Buffycats and sometimes goes along with them on their adventures.
- Gas (voiced by Billy Bob Thompson) is a stinky cat with droopy whiskers. He is mostly stinky because of an event that happened during his kittenhood and is useful when villains come in to play.
- Snobine (voiced by Ilaria Latini in Italian and Haven Paschall in English) is a sophisticated cat who is Gas's love interest, as the only cat who doesn't mind his stench.
- Gaby (voiced by Lisa Ortiz) is a reporter Siamese cat that used to spread false rumors, but now only reports negatively on villains. She sometimes works as an announcer.
- Igor (voiced by Daniele Raffaeli in Italian and Sarah Natochenny in English) is a strong Siamese or Birman cat that can lift others with just one arm.
- Neko (voiced by Alyson Leigh Rosenfield in English) is a cat with a bell collar and usually has good luck as well as likes collecting four-leaf clovers.
- Fleur (voiced by Alyson Leigh Rosenfield in English) is a yellow cat who is obsessed with flowers.
- Cato (voiced by Marc Thompson in English) is a black cat who is a master of a cat version of kung fu called "cat fu".
- Wrench (voiced by Wayne Grayson in English) is a brown cat that works as a mechanic. He has a Canadian accent in the English dub.
- Edison (voiced by Marc Thompson in English) is an inventive cat that has a backpack with wings that can help him soar through the air.
- Piperita (voiced by Erica Schroeder in English) is a chef cat that looks like an ocelot who runs a restaurant.
- Astricat (voiced by Lisa Ortiz) is a pink alien cat that sleeps upside down and lives on Planet Meow.
- Cats in Black (voiced by Mike Pollock, Maxwell Rockatansky and H.D. Quinn in English) are a group of secret agent cats that help space cats like Astricat in the sky and were inspired by Men in Black.
- LaPalette (voiced by Franco Mannella in Italian and H.D. Quinn in English) is a French cat with an eye for art.
- Quatermain (voiced by Marc Thompson in English) is an adventurer cat that searches for ancient treasures.
- Tutan-kat-mon (voiced by Maxwell Rockatansky in English) is an ancient cat who is surprisingly still alive despite the fact that his owner is dead; he has a golden scratching post.
- The Pinky Paws are a group of musical cats that all have pink fur and when they like something, they call it “furtastic”.
  - Cherry (voiced by Haven Paschall in English) is the lead singer of the trio and wears Magenta.
  - Lolly (voiced by Cait Powers-Page in English) is the second Pinky Paw that wears purple.
  - Betty (voiced by Lauren Delgenio in English) is the third Pinky Paw that wears mint green.
- Milky and Choc (both voiced by Wayne Grayson) are two circus cats that are twin brothers.
- Scribbly (voiced by Barrett Leddy in English) is a shy cat with glasses that scribbles messages onto paper airplanes.
- Snoogie a.k.a. the Masked Cat (voiced by Marc Thompson) is a superhero cat that can fly using his tail.
- Olympio (voiced by Billy Bob Thompson) is a teal cat who plays basketball and has never dropped the ball in his whole life.
- Cop (voiced by Mike Pollock in English) is a police officer cat.
- Ambrogio (voiced by Oreste Baldini in Italian and H.D. Quinn in English) is a fashionable Siamese cat.
- Cream (voiced by Leonardo Graziano in Italian and Dan Edwards in English) is a cat that makes tasty ice cream.
- Archibald (voiced by Roberto Stocchi in Italian and Abe Goldfarb in English) is Lampo's prim and proper uncle, but despite being proper, he's not afraid to rock out with his nephew.
- Corney (voiced by Henry F. Benjamin in English) is a farmer cat that lives at his country farm.
- Baby Pie (voiced by Sarah Natochenny in English) is a baby kitten that constantly causes trouble only because he just either wants to play or eat.
- Dr. Fisby (voiced by Henry F. Benjamin in English) is a doctor cat that looks after sick cats and makes them feel better.
- Jungle (voiced by H.D. Quinn in English) is a wildcat that lives in a botanical garden with his parrot friend Tata. He loves bananas and can only communicate by growling due to the fact that he isn't intelligent enough to talk because he never lived near or with humans and instead, in the wild.
- Glitter (voiced by Marc Thompson in English) is a blue cat dressed as Santa Claus.

== Episodes ==
=== Series overview ===
Series	Episodes	Originally released	
Series	Episodes	First released	Last released
1	37	12 November 2018	29 December 2019
2	52	15 February 2020	7 February 2021

=== Season 1 (2018–19) ===
No.	Title	Italian air date	U.S. air date	Prod. code	U.S. viewers (millions)
1	"Buffycats on a Mission"	12 November 2018	25 May 2019	101A	0.68
The Buffycats set out to retrieve the deed to their house when Boss steals it for Winston. Song: "44 Cats," performed by Elisabeth Tsong and Kid Chorus
2	"A Puppy to Save"	12 November 2018	25 May 2019	101B	0.43
The sleep-deprived Buffycats help a lost puppy find his way home after he gets harassed by Boss and his gang.
3	"The Astronaut Cat"	12 November 2018	10 June 2019	102	0.60
3	"Cat Traps"	12 November 2018	10 June 2019	102	0.60
"The Astronaut Cat": Cosmo dreams of becoming the first astro-cat in history, and for his birthday, the Buffycats decide to make his dream come true. "Cat Traps": Winston's garden is full of cat traps. Song: "The Noodles of Granny Pina," performed by Elisabeth Tsong and Kid Chorus
4	"Gaby, The Reporter Cat"	TBA	11 June 2019	103	0.61
4	"Gas, The Stinky Cat"	TBA	11 June 2019	103	0.61
"Gaby, The Reporter Cat": When snoopy Gaby is caught by Brutus the cat catcher, the Buffycats run to help. "Gas, The Stinky Cat": Every cat escapes when Gas is around because he's the smelliest cat. Song: "The Stinky Cat," performed by Elisabeth Tsong, Natalie Rarick, Piccola Coro, and Samuel Vincent
5	"Granny Pina's Secret Recipe"	TBA	12 June 2019	104	0.63
5	"Neko, The Lucky Cat"	TBA	12 June 2019	104	0.63
"Granny Pina's Secret Recipe": Lampo wants to prepare Granny's noodles to give a boost of energy to his friends, but the recipe slips out of his paws and flies away in the wind. "Neko, The Lucky Cat": Once the luckiest cat in town, Neko loses his luck.
6	"A Dog as a Friend"	TBA	13 June 2019	105	0.67
6	"Lampo and the Crazy Race"	TBA	13 June 2019	105	0.67
"A Dog as a Friend": Terry, the neighbor's dog, loves cats and wants to be one, so the Buffycats teach him how. Song: "Puppy Kitten," performed by Elisabeth Tsong and Natalie Rarick "Lampo and the Crazy Race": Lampo wants to join the motorbike race, so mechanic cat Wrench builds him a bike.
7	"Cat Fever"	TBA	17 June 2019	106A	0.63
Lampo is terrified of Fisby, the doctor cat, but must recover if he doesn't want stinky Gas to sing with the Buffycats.
8	"The Dance Contest"	TBA	18 June 2019	106B	0.63
Ginny dreams of winning a famous dance competition, but lacks self-confidence. Song: "The Sunflower Dance," performed by Elisabeth Tsong and Kid Chorus
9	"Milady and the Cat-Fu Master"	TBA	19 June 2019	107A	0.60
Milady takes clumsy Meatball to Cato, who can teach him Cat-fu and prevent him from being the perfect target for Blister and Scab.
10	"Milky & Chock's Circus"	TBA	20 June 2019	107B	0.66
The Buffycats are charmed by a clown cat's skills.
11	"Dogsitter Mission"	TBA	21 June 2019	108A	0.71
The Buffycats offer to help take care of puppies Zoe and Bucky for a day and try and teach the pair to get along. Song: "Naughty Pesky Rascal Mood," performed by Brittney Pressly
12	"Underwater Mission"	TBA	29 June 2019	109	0.52
12	"Piperita, The Chef Cat"	TBA	29 June 2019	109	0.52
"Underwater Mission": When the Buffycats forget Granny's birthday, they look for a gift for her under the sea. "Piperita, The Chef Cat": Piperita dreams of becoming a master chef, but her recipes are not very successful. Song: "A Tasty Paella," performed by Elisabeth Tsong
13	"Snobine, The Snobbish Cat"	TBA	6 July 2019	110	0.47
13	"Four Cats and a Camel"	TBA	6 July 2019	110	0.47
"Snobine, The Snobbish Cat": Gas gets a crush on the new kitten, Snobine, but he doesn't know how to win her heart. "Four Cats and a Camel": Winston is determined to keep Kataly, a fast baby camel, but the Buffycats don't like the idea. Song: "Kataly the Camel," performed by Elisabeth Tsong and Kid Chorus
14	"Detective Pilou"	TBA	13 July 2019	111	0.51
14	"A Game for the Buffycats"	TBA	13 July 2019	111	0.51
"Detective Pilou": Pilou enjoys playing detective and is thrilled when Fleur asks the Buffycats to help find her missing flower. "A Game for the Buffycats": The Buffycats plan a treasure hunt to have fun.
15	"The Superhero Cat"	TBA	20 July 2019	112	0.37
15	"Lampo at the Buffolympics"	TBA	20 July 2019	112	0.37
"The Superhero Cat": The Buffycats must become heroes when their favorite superhero becomes trapped. Song: "The Secret of The Masked Cat," performed by Elisabeth Tsong "Lampo at the Buffolympics": Lampo is determined to win the Buffolympics.
16	"Ambrogio, the Stylist Cat"	TBA	3 August 2019	113	0.45
16	"A New Friend for Pilou"	TBA	3 August 2019	113	0.45
"Ambrogio, the Stylist Cat": When everyone is thrilled because Ambrogio, the stylist cat, comes to town, he, as he arrives, immediately acts shy and surly; the truth is, he totally lost his inspiration. "A New Friend for Pilou": Since the other Buffycats are all busy, Pilou is looking for someone else to play with. Song: "The Brat Cat," performed by Piccola Coro
17	"Cats in Black"	TBA	17 August 2019	114	0.38
17	"The Art of LaPalette"	TBA	17 August 2019	114	0.38
"Cats in Black": The Buffycats play space battles when an alien cat's spaceship lands in Granny's garden. "The Art of LaPalette": Boss and the Buffycats challenge each other to win Monsieur LaPalette's art contest.
18	"The Flying Cat"	TBA	26 August 2019	116	0.41
18	"Tutankatmon's Treasure"	TBA	26 August 2019	116	0.41
"The Flying Cat": Meatball helps Edison with his flying invention. "Tutankatmon's Treasure": The Buffycats assist Quatermain in searching for the treasure of Tutankatmon. Song: "Tutankatmon," performed by Natalie Rarick
19	"The Great Robin Rescue"	TBA	27 August 2019	117	0.46
19	"May the Best Cat Win"	TBA	27 August 2019	117	0.46
"The Great Robin Rescue": Robin panics when she discovers her egg is missing. "May the Best Cat Win": Meatball and Pilou hold the ultimate competition for rivals Lampo and Milady.
20	"Jungle Cats"	TBA	28 August 2019	118	0.56
20	"Police Cat in Action"	TBA	28 August 2019	118	0.56
"Jungle Cats": The Buffycats visit a botanical garden and see a wild feline living there. Song: "A Song for Jungle," performed by Elisabeth Tsong and Samuel Vincent "Police Cat in Action": The Buffycats meet Police Cat named Cop, who assist in finding a gold statue stolen from LaPalette’s gallery.
21	"Sir Archibald, Gentlecat"	TBA	29 August 2019	119	0.41
21	"Pilou and the Scooter Chase"	TBA	29 August 2019	119	0.41
"Sir Archibald, Gentlecat": Archibald, Lampo's uncle, comes to visit and decides to spend the day teaching Lampo good manners. "Pilou and the Scooter Chase": The Buffycats surprise Pilou with a scooter for her birthday, but the cat catchers trap her furry fellows. Song: "Scooter so Meow-Wow!," performed by Elisabeth Tsong, Natalie Rarick, and Samuel Vincent
22	"The Tailoff Games"	TBA	30 August 2019	120	0.39
22	"Pilou-saurus Rex"	TBA	30 August 2019	120	0.39
"The Tailoff Games": When Boss, Blister and Scab play pranks on the Buffycats, Lampo decides to challenge them to a Tailoff match to solve the situation. "Pilou-saurus Rex": The Buffycats find a toy dinosaur in the garden. Song: "My Plasticy Dinosaur," performed by Piccola Coro and Kid Chorus
23	"Meatball's Secret Move"	TBA	15 September 2019	108B	0.40
Granny Pina loses her precious lucky locket near the river and the Buffycats rush there to find it.
24	"Meatball's Lucky Day"	TBA	22 September 2019	122A	0.32
Learning that it is his lucky day, Meatball challenges the lucky cat Neko to a game of chance.
25	"All Meow for Ice Cream"	TBA	29 September 2019	122B	0.29
The ice cream maker cat's machine doesn't work on a hot day. Song: "A World Made of Ice Cream," performed by Elisabeth Tsong and Kid Chorus
26	"Campfire Cat Tails"	TBA	6 October 2019	123A	0.32
27	"Pinky Paws Rock!"	TBA	13 October 2019	123B	0.39
28	"Scaredy Cats"	TBA	20 October 2019	115A	0.33
29	"Attic Mission"	TBA	27 October 2019	115B	0.31
30	"Meatball the Sleepwalker"	TBA	3 November 2019	124A	0.55
31	"Bongo on Stage"	TBA	17 November 2019	124B	0.37
32	"Farmer Cats for a Day"	TBA	24 November 2019	125A	0.35
33	"Santa's Little Helper"	TBA	1 December 2019	121B	0.36
34	"The Rolling Pin Quest"	TBA	8 December 2019	125B	0.36
35	"Recycling Romp"	TBA	15 December 2019	121A	0.35
36	"Pilou the Kitten Sitter"	TBA	22 December 2019	126A	0.35
37	"44 Cats - The Musical"	TBA	29 December 2019	126B	0.33

=== Season 2 (2020–21) ===
No.	Title	Original release date	Italy viewers (millions)
1	"A Cat-tastic Work of Art!"	15 February 2020	N/A
2	"Peppy's True Talent"	TBA	TBD
3	"Terry, The Firefighter Cat"	TBA	TBD
4	"A Very Special Girl!"	TBA	TBD
5	"The Mystery of the Ghost Cat"	TBA	TBD
6	"The Flying Treasure Hunt"	TBA	TBD
7	"Sir Lamp, The Great Golfer"	TBA	TBD
8	"Pilou And Her Loose Tooth"	TBA	TBD
9	"Scribbly, The Stray Kitten"	TBA	TBD
10	"The Great Scooter Race"	TBA	TBD
11	"The Upside Down World"	TBA	TBD
12	"The Cat Color Game"	TBA	TBD
13	"Sushi, the Globetrotting Puppy"	TBA	TBD
14	"The Best Dog Challenge"	TBA	TBD
15	"A Rainy Day"	TBA	TBD
16	"Aida, the Robot Cat"	TBA	TBD
17	"Meatball, the Mail Delivery Cat"	TBA	TBD
18	"The Basketfur Game"	TBA	TBD
19	"A Day Trip With Uncle Greg"	TBA	TBD
20	"A Fistful of Cat Treats"	TBA	TBD
21	"The Treasure of Catbeard"	TBA	TBD
22	"Mice on the Run!"	TBA	TBD
23	"Mara, the Hippo"	TBA	TBD
24	"The Halloween Monster"	TBA	TBD
25	"Granny Pina's Birthday"	TBA	TBD
26	"The Cat-fu Show"	TBA	TBD
27	"Whisker Twister"	TBA	TBD
28	"Three Cats and a Kitten"	TBA	TBD
29	"Charlie the Cat"	TBA	TBD
30	"The Kite Contest"	TBA	TBD
31	"A Stinky Mission"	TBA	TBD
32	"Christmas Cat-tastrophe"	TBA	TBD
33	"Blondie the Spy-cat"	TBA	TBD
34	"Wild and Brave"	TBA	TBD
35	"The Winter Buffolympics"	TBA	TBD
36	"Underwater Cleanup"	TBA	TBD
37	"Snack Time at the Farm"	TBA	TBD
38	"The Space Rescue"	TBA	TBD
39	"Winston's Anti-Cat Wall"	TBA	TBD
40	"Terry & Cop, Police Cats"	TBA	TBD
41	"The Easter Games"	TBA	TBD
42	"Isotta's Surprise Party"	TBA	TBD
43	"Cats on Ice"	TBA	TBD
44	"Super Cat Mission"	TBA	TBD
45	"The Case of the Secret Ingredient"	TBA	TBD
46	"Mice on Bikes"	TBA	TBD
47	"Lampo, the Puss in Boots"	TBA	TBD
48	"The Ghost Train"	TBA	TBD
49	"Return to the Upside Down World"	TBA	TBD
50	"Choo Choo the Donkey"	TBA	TBD
51	"The Hula Hoop Contest"	TBA	TBD
52	"The World's Tallest Hamburger"	February 7, 2021	N/A

== Broadcast ==
In September 2018, it was announced that the series would premiere on Rai YoYo in Italy on November 12, 2018. The Rai YoYo debut set a ratings record for the channel, exceeding 520,000 viewers with a 2.7% share. In May 2018, it was announced that the show would air on Nickelodeon's various international channels in countries outside of Italy. In the United States, the series previewed on Nickelodeon on May 25, 2019, followed by the official premiere on June 10. The May 25 preview of the show was the highest-rated children's premiere of the day. The first season was added to Netflix on May 1, 2020. Discovery Kids Latin America also airs 44 Cats.
