= Gigi Marzullo =

Italian journalist and television presenter

- Marzullo in 2019
- Born: 25 July 1953 (age 72); Avellino, Italy
- Occupations: Journalist, Television presenter
- Employer: RAI
- Height: 1.77 m (5 ft 10 in)
- Spouse: Antonella De Iuliis (2018-present)

Luigi Marzullo (born 25 July 1953), better known as Gigi Marzullo, is an Italian journalist, television presenter and writer.

Born in Avellino, Marzullo started his career as a journalist for the newspaper Il Mattino, then in 1983 he became a collaborator of RAI TV. Since 1989 he hosts the Rai 1 late night talk show Sottovoce (previously titled until 1994 Mezzanotte e dintorni).
