= Patricia Millardet =

French actress (1957–2020)

- Born: 24 March 1957; Mont-de-Marsan, France
- Died: 13 April 2020 (aged 63); Rome, Italy
- Occupation: Actress
- Years active: 1980–2001
- Notable work: The Sun Also Shines at Night, Tir groupe
- Spouse: William Randolph Castleman

Patricia Millardet (24 March 1957 − 13 April 2020) was a French movie and television actress, who played judge Silvia Conti in the Italian mafia series La piovra.

She died of a heart attack in 2020 at the age of 63.

== Partial filmography ==
- Je vais craquer (Rat Race, 1980)
- Fifty-Fifty (1981) as Patricia Mercadier
- Tir groupé (1982) as Anne-Marie
- Plus beau que moi, tu meurs (1982) as Mylène
- La Boum 2 (1982)
- Mortelle randonnée (Deadly Circuit, 1983)
- Sandy (1983) as Catherine
- Ronde de nuit (1984) as Joséphine
- P'tit Con (1984) as Aurore
- L'Île de la jeune fille bleue (1984, TV Movie) as Anne Coulange
- Blessure (1985) as Julie
- L'Heure Simenon: Strip-tease (1987, TV Series) as Célita
- Les Passions de Céline (1987, TV Series) as Béatrice
- Série noire (1986, Episode: "La Nuit du flingueur") as Nina
- Le Chevalier de Pardaillan (1988, TV Series) as Fausta
- Série noire (1988, Episode: "Cause à l'autre") as Eléna
- La piovra, season 4 (1989, TV Mini-Series) as Silvia Conti
- Coplan: Le vampire des Caraïbes (1989, TV Series) as Jenny
- The Sun Also Shines at Night (1990) as Aurelia
- La piovra, season 5 (1990, TV Mini-Series) as Silvia Conti
- Errore fatale (Condition Critical, 1991, TV Movie) as Giulia Visconti
- Hélène et les Garçons (1992, TV Series)
- Jo et Milou (1992, TV Movie) as Jo
- Hot Chocolate (1992, TV Movie) as Lucrétia
- La piovra, season 6 (1992, TV Mini-Series) as Silvia Conti
- Nero come il cuore (Black as the Heart, 1994, TV Movie) as Giovanna Alga Croce
- La piovra, season 7 (1994, TV Mini-Series) as Silvia Conti
- Wild Justice (1994, TV Movie) as Magda Altmann
- Visioner (Babyraub – Kinder fremder Mächte, 1998, TV Movie) as Jeanne
- Un bacio nel buio (A Kiss in the Dark, 1999, TV Movie) as Alessandra Del Giudice
- La piovra, season 10 (1999, TV Mini-Series) as Silvia Conti
- Il bello delle donne (2002–2003, TV Series) as Avv. Angelina Brusa
