= The Last Wagon (1943 film) =

1943 film

- Film poster
- Directed by: Mario Mattoli
- Written by: Aldo Fabrizi; Federico Fellini
- Starring: Aldo Fabrizi; Anna Magnani; Anita Durante
- Cinematography: Tino Santoni
- Edited by: Fernando Tropea
- Music by: Mario Ruccione
- Production company: Continentalcine
- Distributed by: Artisti Associati
- Release date: December 1943
- Running time: 88 minutes
- Country: Italy
- Language: Italian

The Last Wagon (Italian: L'ultima carrozzella) is a 1943 Italian comedy film directed by Mario Mattoli and starring Aldo Fabrizi, Anna Magnani, and Anita Durante. A number of the personnel were involved in the subsequent development of neorealism. The hero is the driver of a horse-drawn carriage who objects to the competition from motorised taxis. The film's sets were designed by the art directors Piero Filippone and Mario Rappini. It was shot at the Palatino Studios in Rome and on location around the city.

== Cast ==
- Aldo Fabrizi as Antonio Urbani, detto "Toto"
- Anna Magnani as Mary Dunchetti, la canzonettista
- Anita Durante as Adele Urbani
- Elide Spada as Nannarella Urbani
- Enzo Fiermonte as Roberto Pinelli, l'autista
- Aristide Garbini as Pasquale, suo padre
- Lauro Gazzolo as Andrea, il portiere
- Tino Scotti as Valentino Doriani, il comico
- Nando Bruno as Augusto Pallotta, il vetturino
- Leopoldo Valentini as Ottone Roncucci detto "Paradiso"
- Oreste Fares as Il medico
- Marina Doge as L'amica di Nannarella
- Olga Solbelli as La padrona della pensione "Flora"
- Vittorio Cuomo as Filippo, il padrone dell'osteria
- Renato Mariani as Il signor sul treno

== Bibliography ==
- Brunetta, Gian Piero. The History of Italian Cinema: A Guide to Italian Film from Its Origins to the Twenty-first Century. Princeton University Press, 2009.
- Wagstaff, Christopher. Italian Neorealist Cinema: An Aesthetic Approach. University of Toronto Press, 2007.
