= Pino Insegno =

Italian actor, voice actor and television presenter

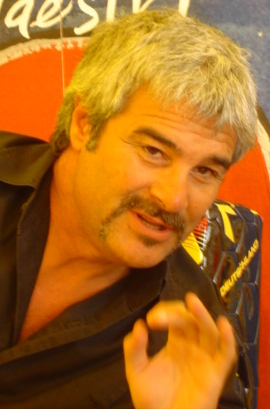
- Insegno at the Giffoni Film Festival in 2008
- Born: Giuseppe Insegno; 30 August 1959 (age 67); Rome, Italy
- Occupations: Actor; voice actor; comedian; dubbing director; television presenter
- Years active: 1981–present
- Known for: Member of Premiata Ditta
- Spouses: Roberta Lanfranchi (m. 1997; div. 2007) Alessia Navarro (m. 2012)
- Children: 4
- Relatives: Rossana Di Lorenzo (aunt); Maurizio Arena (uncle)

Giuseppe "Pino" Insegno (born 30 August 1959) is an Italian actor, voice actor, television presenter and comedian.

Since 1986, Insegno has been a member of the comedy quartet Premiata Ditta and he also found success presenting a variety of television shows across Italy and dubbing characters in Italian.

== Career ==
Born in Rome, Insegno is the first-born son of Armando Insegno and Romana Di Lorenzo, who was the sister of the actors Maurizio Arena and Rossana Di Lorenzo. He began his career in 1981 and then eventually in 1986, he became a member of Premiata Ditta alongside Roberto Ciufoli, Francesca Draghetti and Tiziana Foschi. The group performed a variety of comedy sketches on stage, television, and film, most notably the 1995 film L'assassino è quello con le scarpe gialle. Insegno also appeared in the music video for the song Tu stasera non esci by Gemelli Diversi on their second album 4x4.

Between the early and mid-2000s, he was one of four presenters of Premiata Teleditta alongside his three colleagues. In 2010, for Rai 1, he hosted the show Insegnami a sognare and from 2010 to 2013, the Italian version of the French-Canadian game show Action Réaction. He also presented shows for Mediaset.

Insegno is recognised as a voice dubber. He serves as the official Italian voice of Will Ferrell, having dubbed him in a majority of his films. He also dubbed Viggo Mortensen, Liev Schreiber and Sacha Baron Cohen in some of their movies. He is well known for voicing Stan Smith in the first 20 seasons of the Italian-Language version of American Dad and he performed the Italian voices of Diego in the Ice Age film series, John Smith in Pocahontas and Pocahontas II: Journey to a New World, Chick Hicks in Cars and Cars 3, The Magic Mirror in the Shrek movies, and also dubbed several characters in The Simpsons.

== Personal life ==
Insegno is the older brother of actor Claudio Insegno. From his first marriage to actress Roberta Lanfranchi, Insegno has two sons, Matteo and Francesco. He also has two other sons, Alessandro and Valerio, with his second and current wife Alessia Navarro.

== Filmography ==
=== Cinema ===
Year	Title	Role(s)	Notes
1983	Escape from the Bronx		
1984	In punta di piedi	Discotheque guitarist	
1985	Mezzo destro mezzo sinistro - 2 calciatori senza pallone	Carlo Vacca	
1985	A me mi piace	Fireman	
1988	I giorni randagi	Andrea	
1989	Le finte bionde	Raging Dull	
1995	L'assassino è quello con le scarpe gialle	Pino	
2003	The Angels of Borsellino	Agostino Catalano	
2008	Ti stramo - Ho voglia di un'ultima notte da manuale prima di tre baci sopra il cielo	Extramarcio	
2010	Alta infedeltà	Filippo	
2010	From the Waist Up	Superintendent Ciarnò	
2013	Una notte agli studios	Padre Marras	
2017	Ovunque tu sarai	Giordano's father	
2022	(Im)perfetti criminali	Leader of the Nighthawks	

=== Television ===
Year	Title	Role(s)	Notes
2000	The Squad	Dario	TV film
2006	Lo zio d'America	Alfonso	TV series
2007	Quelli dell'intervallo	Mathematics Professor	1 episode
2008	Vita da paparazzo	Gino	TV miniseries
2018	Un posto al sole	Emanuele Roversi	1 episode

== Voice work ==
=== Dubbing ===
==== Films (Animation, Italian dub) ====
Year	Title	Role(s)	Ref
1984	Nausicaä of the Valley of the Wind	Kurotowa	
1995	Pocahontas	John Smith	
1998	Pocahontas II: Journey to a New World	John Smith	
2000	Princes and Princesses	Boy	
2001	Shrek	Magic Mirror	
2002	Ice Age	Diego	
2003	Sinbad: Legend of the Seven Seas	Sinbad	
2004	Shrek 2	Magic Mirror	
2006	Ice Age: The Meltdown	Diego	
2006	Cars	Chick Hicks	
2006	Asterix and the Vikings	Obelix	
2006	Open Season	Boog	
2006	Charlotte's Web	Elwyn the Crow	
2007	Ratatouille	TV narrator	
2008	Open Season 2	Boog	
2009	Ice Age: Dawn of the Dinosaurs	Diego	
2009	The Princess and the Frog	Louis	
2010	Open Season 3	Boog	
2010	Tangled	The Stabbington Brothers	
2010	Space Dogs	Kazbek	
2010	Shrek Forever After	Magic Mirror	
2011	Rio	Rafael	
2011	Rango	Elgin	
2012	Ice Age: Continental Drift	Diego	
2012	The Suicide Shop	Mishima Tuvache	
2013	Justin and the Knights of Valour	Melquiades / Karolius	
2013	Legends of Oz: Dorothy's Return	Appraiser	
2013	Free Birds	Ranger	
2014	The Nut Job	Percy "King" Dimpleweed	
2014	Rio 2	Rafael	
2014	The Lego Movie	Lord Business	
2014	Princess Mononoke	Jigo (2014 redub)	
2015	Open Season: Scared Silly	Boog	
2015	Strange Magic	Bog King	
2015	Miss Hokusai	Hokusai / Tetsuzō	
2015	The Boy and the Beast	Kumatetsu	
2016	Trolls	King Peppy	
2016	Storks	Hunter	
2016	Ice Age: Collision Course	Diego	
2016	Sing	Big Daddy	
2017	Cars 3	Chick Hicks	
2017	Mazinger Z: Infinity	Commander	
2018	Sherlock Gnomes	Ronnie	
2018	Isle of Dogs	Spots	
2019	The Lego Movie 2: The Second Part	Lord Business	
2019	The Addams Family	Gomez Addams	
2020	Trolls World Tour	King Peppy	
2020	Scoob!	Dick Dastardly	
2020	Earwig and the Witch	Mandrake	
2021	The Addams Family 2	Gomez Addams	
2021	Tom and Jerry	Spike	

==== Films (Live action, Italian dub) ====
Year	Title	Role(s)	Original actor	Ref
1981	The Great Muppet Caper	Nicky Holiday	Charles Grodin	
1985	Pale Rider	Josh LaHood	Chris Penn	
1986	Caravaggio	Ranuccio	Sean Bean	
1986	Three Amigos	Ned Nederlander	Martin Short	
1986	Platoon	Junior	Reggie Johnson	
1989	A Nightmare on Elm Street 5: The Dream Child	Dan Jordan	Danny Hassel	
1990	Why Me?	Gus Cardinale	Christopher Lambert	
1990	The Bonfire of the Vanities	Tom Killian	Kevin Dunn	
1991	My Own Private Idaho	Scott Favor	Keanu Reeves	
1992	Peter's Friends	Brian	Tony Slattery	
1993	Mr. Wonderful	Gus DeMarco	Matt Dillon	
1993	Much Ado About Nothing	Dogberry	Michael Keaton	
1993	Even Cowgirls Get the Blues	Julian Gitche	Keanu Reeves	
1993	Fire in the Sky	David Whitlock	Peter Berg	
1994	I.Q.	Ed Walters	Tim Robbins	
1995	Rough Magic	Alex Ross	Russell Crowe	
1995	Tommy Boy	Thomas "Tommy" Callahan III	Chris Farley	
1995	The American President	Lewis Rothschild	Michael J. Fox	
1995	12 Monkeys	Jeffrey Goines	Brad Pitt	
1995	Destiny Turns on the Radio	Julian Goddard	Dylan McDermott	
1995	Stonewall	La Miranda	Guillermo Díaz	
1996	City Hall	Kevin Calhoun	John Cusack	
1996	Black Sheep	Mike Donnelly	Chris Farley	
1996	Moebius	Edmundo	Horacio Roca	
1997	Deceiver	Detective Phillip Braxton	Chris Penn	
1997	The Informant	Sean Pius "Gingy" McAnally	Anthony Brophy	
1997	The Full Monty	Dave Horsfall	Mark Addy	
1997	Anna Karenina	Konstantin Dmitrievich Levin	Alfred Molina	
1997	Speed 2: Cruise Control	Maurice	Glenn Plummer	
1998	54	Steve Rubell	Mike Myers	
1998	Buffalo '66	Bookie	Mickey Rourke	
1998	Dr. Dolittle	Lucky	Norm Macdonald	
1998	Ronin	Spence	Sean Bean	
1998	The Object of My Affection	Vince McBride	John Pankow	
1999	The 13th Warrior	Herger	Dennis Storhøi	
2000	The Flintstones in Viva Rock Vegas	The Great Gazoo	Alan Cumming	
2000	The Family Man	Cash	Don Cheadle	
2000	Scary Movie	Doofy Gilmore / The Killer	Dave Sheridan	
2001	Zoolander	Jacobim Mugatu	Will Ferrell	
2001	The Lord of the Rings: The Fellowship of the Ring	Aragorn	Viggo Mortensen	
2001	Dr. Dolittle 2	Lucky	Norm Macdonald	
2001	Kate & Leopold	Stuart Besser	Liev Schreiber	
2001	Just Visiting	Andre	Christian Clavier	
2001	Ali	Muhammad Ali	Will Smith	
2001	Original Sin	Walter Downs / Billy / Mephisto	Thomas Jane	
2001	Shaolin Soccer	Fung / Golden Leg	Ng Man-tat	
2002	The Lord of the Rings: The Two Towers	Aragorn	Viggo Mortensen	
2002	Ali G Indahouse	Ali G	Sacha Baron Cohen	
2003	The Lord of the Rings: The Return of the King	Aragorn	Viggo Mortensen	
2003	Elf	Buddy Hobbs	Will Ferrell	
2003	The Matrix Reloaded	Link	Harold Perrineau	
2003	The Matrix Revolutions	Link	Harold Perrineau	
2003	Duplex	Narrator	Danny DeVito	
2003	Le Divorce	Yves	Romain Duris	
2003	The Return	Father	Konstantin Lavronenko	
2004	Crash	Sergeant John Ryan	Matt Dillon	
2004	Alexander	Nearchus	Denis Conway	
2004	Starsky & Hutch	Big Earl Drennan	Will Ferrell	
2004	Anchorman: The Legend of Ron Burgundy	Ron Burgundy	Will Ferrell	
2004	Melinda and Melinda	Hobie	Will Ferrell	
2004	The Merchant of Venice	Prince of Morocco	David Harewood	
2004	Ray	Ray Charles Robinson	Jamie Foxx	
2004	Hidalgo	Frank Hopkins	Viggo Mortensen	
2004	Jersey Girl	Will Smith	Will Smith	
2004	The Life and Death of Peter Sellers	Peter Sellers	Geoffrey Rush	
2004	Flight of the Phoenix	A.J.	Tyrese Gibson	
2005	Wedding Crashers	Chazz Reinhold	Will Ferrell	
2005	Bewitched	Jack Wyatt	Will Ferrell	
2005	The Producers	Franz Liebkind	Will Ferrell	
2005	A History of Violence	Joey Cusack / Tom Stall	Viggo Mortensen	
2005	Seven Swords	Chu Zhaonan	Donnie Yen	
2006	Alatriste	Captain Diego Alatriste	Viggo Mortensen	
2006	Stranger than Fiction	Harold Crick	Will Ferrell	
2006	Talladega Nights: The Ballad of Ricky Bobby	Ricky Bobby	Will Ferrell	
2006	Borat	Borat Sagdiyev	Sacha Baron Cohen	
2006	The Departed	Sean Dignam	Mark Wahlberg	
2006	A Guide to Recognizing Your Saints	Dito Montiel	Robert Downey Jr.	
2007	Before the Devil Knows You're Dead	Andy Hanson	Philip Seymour Hoffman	
2007	Blades of Glory	Chazz Michael Michaels	Will Ferrell	
2007	Spider-Man 3	Flint Marko / Sandman	Thomas Haden Church	
2007	American Gangster	Frank Lucas	Denzel Washington	
2007	Across the Universe	Jo-Jo	Martin Luther McCoy	
2007	Eastern Promises	Nikolai Luzhin	Viggo Mortensen	
2007	Goodbye Bafana	Nelson Mandela	Dennis Haysbert	
2007	The Godfather Part II	Vito Corleone (2007 redub)	Robert De Niro	
2007	The Hunting Party	Duck	Terrence Howard	
2007	Epic Movie	Borat Sagdiyev	Danny Jacobs	
2007	Like Stars on Earth	Ram Shankar Nikumbh	Aamir Khan	
2008	Semi-Pro	Jackie Moon	Will Ferrell	
2008	Step Brothers	Brennan Huff	Will Ferrell	
2008	Appaloosa	Everett Hitch	Viggo Mortensen	
2008	Inkheart	Capricorn	Andy Serkis	
2008	The Happening	Elliot Moore	Mark Wahlberg	
2008	Max Payne	Max Payne	Mark Wahlberg	
2008	Changeling	Detective Lester Ybarra	Michael Kelly	
2008	Beverly Hills Chihuahua	Manuel	Cheech Marin	
2009	The Road	Man	Viggo Mortensen	
2009	Armored	Mickey "Mike" Cochrane	Matt Dillon	
2009	Brüno	Brüno Gehard	Sacha Baron Cohen	
2009	Land of the Lost	Dr. Rick Marshall	Will Ferrell	
2009	X-Men Origins: Wolverine	Victor Creed / Sabretooth	Liev Schreiber	
2009	Taking Woodstock	Betty von Vilma	Liev Schreiber	
2009	Indiana Jones and the Raiders of the Lost Ark	Indiana Jones (2009 redub)	Harrison Ford	
2009	Night at the Museum: Battle of the Smithsonian	Kahmunrah	Hank Azaria	
2009	Sherlock Holmes	Professor Moriarty	Andrew Jack	
2010	The Other Guys	Allen Gamble	Will Ferrell	
2010	Valentine's Day	Alfonso	George Lopez	
2010	Burke & Hare	William Hare	Andy Serkis	
2010	Robin Hood	Friar Tuck	Mark Addy	
2010	The A-Team	Bosco "B.A." Baracus	Quinton Jackson	
2010	Every Day	Ned Freed	Liev Schreiber	
2010	Salt	Theodore "Ted" Winter / Nikolai Tarkovsky	Liev Schreiber	
2010	Date Night	Holbrooke Grant	Mark Wahlberg	
2011	A Dangerous Method	Sigmund Freud	Viggo Mortensen	
2011	The Adjustment Bureau	Charlie Traynor	Michael Kelly	
2011	Hugo	Inspector Gustave Dasté	Sacha Baron Cohen	
2011	Sherlock Holmes: A Game of Shadows	Professor Moriarty	Jared Harris	
2011	Rise of the Planet of the Apes	Caesar	Andy Serkis	
2012	The Iceman	Richard Kuklinski	Michael Shannon	
2012	Get the Gringo	Richard 'The Gringo' Johnson	Mel Gibson	
2012	The Campaign	Cam Brady	Will Ferrell	
2012	The Internship	Kevin	Will Ferrell	
2012	The Man with the Iron Fists	Blacksmith	RZA	
2012	The Hunger Games	Cinna	Lenny Kravitz	
2012	Chronicle	Richard Detmer	Michael Kelly	
2012	Django Unchained	Django Freeman	Jamie Foxx	
2012	The Dictator	Admiral-General Haffaz Aladeen, Efawadh	Sacha Baron Cohen	
2012	Les Misérables	M. Thénardier	Sacha Baron Cohen	
2012	The Amazing Spider-Man	Dr. Curt Connors / Lizard	Rhys Ifans	
2012	The Reluctant Fundamentalist	Bobby Lincoln	Liev Schreiber	
2012	On the Road	Old Bull Lee	Viggo Mortensen	
2013	Anchorman 2: The Legend Continues	Ron Burgundy	Will Ferrell	
2013	Man of Steel	Steve Lombard	Michael Kelly	
2013	The Last Days on Mars	Vincent Campbell	Liev Schreiber	
2013	The Butler	Lyndon B. Johnson	Liev Schreiber	
2013	Fading Gigolo	Dovi	Liev Schreiber	
2013	The Hunger Games: Catching Fire	Cinna	Lenny Kravitz	
2013	The Devil's Violinist	Urbani	Jared Harris	
2013	White House Down	James Sawyer	Jamie Foxx	
2013	The Art of the Steal	Nicky Calhoun	Matt Dillon	
2014	The Two Faces of January	Chester MacFarland	Viggo Mortensen	
2014	Pawn Sacrifice	Boris Spassky	Liev Schreiber	
2014	The Expendables 3	Doctor "Doc" Death	Wesley Snipes	
2014	The Lego Movie	The Man Upstairs	Will Ferrell	
2014	Sin City: A Dame to Kill For	Dwight McCarthy	Josh Brolin	
2014	A Million Ways to Die in the West	Django Freeman	Jamie Foxx	
2014	She's Funny That Way	Seth Gilbert	Rhys Ifans	
2014	Do Not Disturb	Michel Leproux	Christian Clavier	
2015	Freeheld	Dane Wells	Michael Shannon	
2015	Poltergeist	Carrigan Burke	Jared Harris	
2015	Pixels	Eddie "The Fireblaster" Plant	Peter Dinklage	
2015	The Revenant	Andrew Henry	Domhnall Gleeson	
2015	Get Hard	James King	Will Ferrell	
2015	Daddy's Home	Brad Whitaker	Will Ferrell	
2015	Superfast!	Vin Serento	Dale Pavinski	
2015	A Perfect Day	Mambrú	Benicio del Toro	
2015	Spotlight	Martin Baron	Liev Schreiber	
2015	Max	Raymond "Ray" Wincott	Thomas Haden Church	
2015	Spy	Aldo	Peter Serafinowicz	
2016	The 5th Wave	Colonel Alexander Vosch	Liev Schreiber	
2016	Elvis & Nixon	Elvis Presley	Michael Shannon	
2016	Loving	Grey Villet	Michael Shannon	
2016	Grimsby	Kyle Alan "Nobby" Butcher	Sacha Baron Cohen	
2016	Alice Through the Looking Glass	Time	Sacha Baron Cohen	
2016	Zoolander 2	Jacobim Mugatu	Will Ferrell	
2016	Crouching Tiger, Hidden Dragon: Sword of Destiny	Silent Wolf	Donnie Yen	
2016	Captain Fantastic	Ben Cash	Viggo Mortensen	
2016	Allied	Frank Heslop	Jared Harris	
2016	The Birth of a Nation	Hark Turner	Colman Domingo	
2017	The House	Scott Johansen	Will Ferrell	
2017	Daddy's Home 2	Brad Whitaker	Will Ferrell	
2017	Baby Driver	Leon 'Bats' Jefferson III	Jamie Foxx	
2017	The Shape of Water	Richard Strickland	Michael Shannon	
2017	The Current War	George Westinghouse	Michael Shannon	
2017	Naked	Reginald Swope	Dennis Haysbert	
2018	Den of Thieves	Enson Levoux	50 Cent	
2018	Green Book	Tony Lip	Viggo Mortensen	
2018	Robin Hood	Little John	Jamie Foxx	
2018	Avengers: Infinity War	Eitri	Peter Dinklage	
2018	Holmes & Watson	Sherlock Holmes	Will Ferrell	
2018	Bohemian Rhapsody	Ray Foster	Mike Myers	
2018	12 Strong	Hal Spencer	Michael Shannon	
2018	Deadpool 2	Nathan Summers / Cable	Josh Brolin	
2018	BlacKkKlansman	Chief Bridges	Robert John Burke	
2018	I Feel Pretty	Really Tan Dude	Dave Attell	
2019	A Rainy Day in New York	Roland Pollard	Liev Schreiber	
2019	Knives Out	Walt Thrombey	Michael Shannon	
2019	The Lego Movie 2: The Second Part	The Man Upstairs	Will Ferrell	
2019	Between Two Ferns: The Movie	Will Ferrell	Will Ferrell	
2019	Zeroville	Rondell	Will Ferrell	
2019	Dolemite Is My Name	D'Urville Martin	Wesley Snipes	
2020	Downhill	Pete Stanton	Will Ferrell	
2020	Eurovision Song Contest: The Story of Fire Saga	Lars Erickssong	Will Ferrell	
2020	The Trial of the Chicago 7	Abbie Hoffman	Sacha Baron Cohen	
2020	Borat Subsequent Moviefilm	Borat Sagdiyev	Sacha Baron Cohen	
2020	Falling	John	Viggo Mortensen	
2020	The High Note	Max	Bill Pullman	
2021	The French Dispatch	Talk Show Host	Liev Schreiber	
2021	Spider-Man: No Way Home	Flint Marko / Sandman	Thomas Haden Church	
2022	Crimes of the Future	Saul Tenser	Viggo Mortensen	
2022	Day Shift	Bud Jablonski	Jamie Foxx	
2022	Knives Out	The White Death	Michael Shannon	
2022	Amsterdam	Henry Norcross	Michael Shannon	
2022	Dampyr	Gorka	David Morrissey	
2022	Spirited	Ebenezer Scrooge / Ghost of Christmas Present	Will Ferrell	
2023	Asteroid City	J.J. Kellogg	Liev Schreiber	
2023	Quiz Lady	Terry McTeer	Will Ferrell	
2023	Barbie	CEO of Mattel	Will Ferrell	

==== Television (Animation, Italian dub) ====
Year	Title	Role(s)	Notes	Ref
1993–1999	The Simpsons	Ned Flanders	Recurring role (season 3)	
1993–1999	The Simpsons	Moe Szyslak	Recurring role (season 8)	
1993–1999	The Simpsons	Denis Leary	Lost Verizon (ep. 2, s. 20)	
2000–2004	Courage the Cowardly Dog	Freaky Fred	Recurring role	
2001	Second Star to the Left	Archie	TV film	
2005–present	American Dad!	Stan Smith	Main cast	
2011–2018	The Little Prince	The Snake	Main cast	
2016	Bordertown	El Coyote	Recurring role	
2018–2020	Trolls: The Beat Goes On!	King Peppy	Recurring role	

==== Television (Live action, Italian dub) ====
Year	Title	Role(s)	Notes	Original actor	Ref
1986	The George McKenna Story	George J. McKenna III	TV film	Denzel Washington	
1990	The Law & Harry McGraw	Steve Lacey	Main cast	Shea Farrell	
1995	Citizen X	Viktor Burakov	TV film	Stephen Rea	
2006–2010	30 Rock	Tracy Jordan	Main cast (seasons 1–3)	Tracy Morgan	
2013–2014	Downton Abbey	Anthony Foyle, Viscount Gillingham	12 episodes	Tom Cullen	
2013–2019	Game of Thrones	Tormund Giantsbane	33 episodes	Kristofer Hivju	
2013–2020	Ray Donovan	Raymond "Ray" Donovan	Main cast	Liev Schreiber	
2014	True Detective	Martin "Marty" Hart	Main cast (season 1)	Woody Harrelson	
2014–2020	Power	Kanan Stark	Main cast	50 Cent	
2015	The Player	Mr. Isaiah Johnson	Main cast	Wesley Snipes	
2018	Fahrenheit 451	John Beatty	TV film	Michael Shannon	
2018	Room 104	Nathan	1 episode	Michael Shannon	
2018–2021	Britannia	Aulus Plautius	Main cast	David Morrissey	
2019	Waco	Gary Noesner	TV miniseries	Michael Shannon	
2019	The Spy	Eli Cohen	TV miniseries	Sacha Baron Cohen	
2021	The Shrink Next Door	Martin "Marty" Markowitz	TV miniseries	Will Ferrell	

==== Video games (Italian dub) ====
Year	Title	Role(s)	Ref
2002	The Lord of the Rings: The Two Towers	Aragorn	
2003	The Lord of the Rings: The Return of the King	Aragorn	
2004	The Lord of the Rings: The Third Age	Aragorn	
2006	Cars	Chick Hicks	
2010	Heavy Rain	Ethan Mars	
2012	World of Warcraft: Mists of Pandaria	Chen Stormstout	
2017	Cars 3: Driven to Win	Chick Hicks	
