= List of television programs based on comics =

This is a list of television shows based on comics.

== DC and Marvel ==
As so many DC and Marvel comic books have been adapted into television shows, they have separate entries:

- List of television series based on DC Comics publications
- List of unproduced DC Comics projects
- List of television series based on Marvel Comics publications
- List of unproduced television projects based on Marvel Comics

== Independents ==
- List of television series and films based on Archie Comics publications
- List of television series and films based on Boom! Studios publications
- List of television series and films based on Dark Horse Comics publications
- List of unproduced Dark Horse Comics projects
- List of television series and films based on Harvey Comics publications
- List of television series and films based on IDW Publishing publications
- List of television series and films based on Image Comics publications
- List of unproduced Image Comics projects
- List of television series and films based on Oni Press publications
- List of TV series based on French-language comics
- List of television series based on comic strips

== Live-action ==
- Agua Bendita (Philippines, 2010)
- All of Us Are Dead (South Korea, 2022)
- American Born Chinese (2023)
- Andres de Saya (Philippines, 2011)
- Ang Babaeng Hinugot sa Aking Tadyang (Philippines, 2009)
- Ang Panday (Philippines, 2005–2006)
- Ang Panday (Philippines, 2016)
- Asphalt Man (South Korea, 1995)
- Avengers Social Club (South Korea, 2017)
- Amanza (South Korea, 2020)
- Backstreet Rookie (South Korea, 2020)
- Bakekang (Philippines, 2006–2007)
- Basahang Ginto (Philippines, 2010)
- The Beauty (2026)
- Beauty Newbie (Thailand, 2024)
- Bel Ami (South Korea, 2013–2014)
- Bewegte Männer (Germany, 2003–2005)
- Big Thing (South Korea, 2010)
- Black Knight (South Korea, 2023)
- A Bloody Lucky Day (South Korea, 2023)
- The Blood Sword (Hong Kong, 1990)
- The Blood Sword 2 (Hong Kong, 1991)
- The Boys (TV series) (2019–2026)
- Blusang Itim (Philippines, 2011)
- Bridal Mask (South Korea, 2012)
- The Bride of Habaek (South Korea, 2017)
- Bring It On, Ghost (South Korea, 2020)
- El botones Sacarino (Spain, 2000–2001)
- Business Proposal (South Korea, 2022)
- Captain Barbell (Philippines, 2006–2007)
- Captain Barbell (Philippines, 2011)
- Cashero (2025)
- Chacha Chaudhary (India, 2002)
- Cheese in the Trap (South Korea, 2016)
- Chicken Nugget (South Korea, 2023)
- Christian (Italy, 2022–2023)
- Clean with Passion for Now (South Korea, 2018–2019)
- Click (Italy, 1997)
- Connect (South Korea, 2022)
- Cursed (2020)
- Cybersix (Argentina, 1995)
- Daily Dose of Sunshine (South Korea, 2023)
- Damo (South Korean, 2003)
- Darna (Philippines, 2005)
- Darna (Philippines, 2009–2010)
- Daybreak (2019)
- The Deal (South Korea, 2023–present)
- Death's Game (South Korea, 2023–2024)
- D.P. (South Korea, 2021)
- Dinner Mate (South Korea, 2020)
- Divorce Attorney Shin (South Korea, 2023)
- Dr. Brain (South Korea, 2021–present)
- Dr. Frost (South Korea, 2014–2015)
- Dyesebel (Philippines, 2008)
- Dyesebel (Philippines, 2014)
- The End of the F***ing World (United Kingdom, 2017–2019)
- The Eternaut (Argentina, 2025–)
- Eva & Adam (Sweden, 1999–2001)
- Extraordinary You (South Korea, 2019)
- Feel Good to Die (South Korea, 2018)
- Full House (South Korea, 2004)
- Full House Take 2 (South Korea, 2012)
- Fury (TBA)
- La Fortuna (Spain, 2021)
- Gagambino (Philippines, 2008–2009)
- Galema: Anak ni Zuma (Philippines, 2013–2014)
- Gangnam Beauty (South Korea, 2018)
- ¡García! (Spain, 2022)
- Gaus Electronics (South Korea, 2022)
- Gen V (2023–2025)
- A Girl Who Sees Smells (South Korea, 2015)
- Go Back (South Korea, 2017)
- The Golden Spoon (South Korea, 2022)
- A Good Day to Be a Dog South Korea, 2023–2024)
- Gourmet (South Korea, 2008)
- Harsh Realm (1999–2000)
- Heartstopper (2022–present)
- Hell Is Other People (South Korea, 2019)
- Hellbound (South Korea, 2021)
- High School Return of a Gangster (2024)
- Hi Working Girl (Taiwan, 2003)
- Hogu's Love (South Korea, 2015)
- Hope: Kitai Zero no Shinnyu Shain (Japan, 2016)
- How to Be Thirty (South Korea, 2021)
- How to Buy a Friend (South Korea, 2020)
- Hyde Jekyll, Me (South Korea, 2015)
- I Am Not Okay with This (2020)
- Imitation (South Korea, 2021)
- Inday Bote (Philippines, 2015)
- Inspiring Generation (South Korea, 2014)
- Is It Fate? (South Korea, 2023)
- Itaewon Class (South Korea, 2020)
- Item (South Korea, 2019)
- Jeong Nyeon (South Korea, TBA)
- Jinxed at First (South Korea, 2022)
- Joaquin Bordado (Philippines, 2008)
- Joseon Attorney (South Korea, 2023)
- Kambal sa Uma (Philippines, 2009)
- Kamandag (Philippines, 2007–2008)
- A Killer Paradox (South Korea, 2024)
- The Killing Vote (South Korea, 2023)
- Kingdom (South Korea, 2019–present)
- The Kingdom of the Winds (South Korea, 2008–2009)
- King of Ambition (South Korea, 2013)
- The King of Blaze (China, 2018)
- The King's Affection (South Korea, 2021)
- Kiss Sixth Sense (South Korea, 2022)
- Knight Flower (South Korea, 2024)
- Kokak (Philippines, 2011–2012)
- Komiks (Philippines, 2006–2009)
- Komiks Presents: Dragonna (Philippines, 2008–2009)
- Komiks Presents: Flash Bomba (Philippines, 2009)
- Komiks Presents: Kapitan Boom (Philippines, 2009)
- Komiks Presents: Tiny Tony (Philippines, 2008)
- Komiks Presents: Varga (Philippines, 2008)
- Last (South Korea, 2015)
- Lastikman (Philippines, 2007–2008)
- Let's Fight Ghost (Thailand, 2021)
- The Legend of Hero (Taiwan, 2005)
- Love Alarm (South Korea, 2019–2021)
- The Love of Hypnosis (China, TBA)
- Love Revolution (South Korea, 2020)
- Love Song for Illusion (South Korea, 2024–present)
- Loverly Runner (South Korea, TBA)
- Lucky Romance (South Korea, 2016)
- MADtv (1995–2009, 2016)
- A Man Called God (South Korea, 2010)
- Man and Woman (South Korea, 2023–present)
- Marry Me, Mary! (South Korea, 2010)
- Mask Girl (2023)
- Meloholic (South Korea, 2017)
- Memorist (South Korea, 2020)
- The Middleman (2008)
- Misaeng: Incomplete Life (South Korea, 2014)
- Momay (Philippines, 2010)
- Moon in the Day (South Korea, 2023)
- Moving (South Korea, 2022)
- Murder DIEary (South Korea, TBA)
- My Cute Guys (South Korea, 2013)
- My First Love (South Korea, 2018)
- My Lawyer, Mr. Jo (South Korea, 2016)
- My Lawyer, Mr. Jo 2: Crime and Punishment (South Korea, 2019)
- Mystic Pop-up Bar (South Korea, 2020)
- Navillera (South Korea, 2021)
- The Neighbor (Spain, 2019–2021)
- Nevertheless (South Korea, 2021)
- No, Thank You (South Korea, 2020–2021)
- Ninja Turtles: The Next Mutation (1997–1998)
- Ninjak vs. the Valiant Universe (2018)
- O Doutrinador: A Série (Brazil, 2019)
- Orange Marmalade (South Korea, 2015)
- Painkiller Jane (2007)
- Blusang Itim (Philippines, 2011)
- Pegasus Market (South Korea, 2019)
- El Pantera (Mexico, 2007)
- El pecado de Oyuki (Mexico, 1988)
- Perversions of Science (1997)
- Phoo Action (UK, 2008)
- Princess Hours (South Korea, 2006)
- Queen's (South Korea, 2007)
- Raising Dion (2019–2022)
- Riding High (New Zealand, 1995–1996)
- Rod Santiago's The Sisters (Philippines, 2011)
- Rubí (Mexico, 1968)
- Rubí (Mexico, 2004)
- Rubi (Philippines, 2010)
- Rubí (2020)
- Ruby (Lebanon/Egypt, 2012)
- Rugal (South Korea, 2020)
- Sable (1987)
- Save Me (South Korea, 2017)
- See You in My 19th Life (South Korea, 2023)
- The Scholar Who Walks the Night (South Korea, 2010)
- School Spirits (2023)
- Secrets of the Cryptkeeper's Haunted House (1996–1997)
- Sheena, Queen of the Jungle (1955–1956)
- Sheena (2000–2002)
- A Shoulder to Cry On (South Korea, 2023)
- Sinasamba Kita (Philippines, 2007)
- Songgot: The Piercer (South Korea, 2015)
- The Sound of Magic (South Korea, 2022)
- The Sound of Your Heart (South Korea, 2016)
- Summer's Desire (China, 2010)
- Summer Strike (South Korea, 2022)
- Super Daddy Yeol (South Korea, 2016)
- Sweet Combat (South Korea, 2018)
- Sweet Home (South Korea, 2020)
- Sweet Stranger and Me (South Korea, 2016)
- Tale of Fairy (South Korea, 2018)
- The Tale of Nokdu (South Korea, 2019)
- Tales from the Crypt (1989–1996)
- Taxi Driver (South Korea, 2021)
- Tazza (South Korea, 2008)
- Teach You a Lesson (South Korea, 2026)
- Terry and the Gunrunners (New Zealand, 1985)
- Tomorrow (South Korea, 2022)
- Turn Left Turn Right (Thailand, 2020)
- The Tick (2001–2002)
- The Tick (2016–2019)
- Totoy Bato (Philippines, 2009)
- True Beauty (South Korea, 2020–2021)
- Um Menino Muito Maluquinho (Brazil, 2006)
- The Uncanny Counter (South Korea, 2020–2021)
- Unlock My Boss (South Korea, 2022–2023)
- Vagrant Queen (2020)
- Valentina (Italy, 1989)
- Van Helsing (2016–2021)
- Vigilante (2023)
- The Village (India, 2023)
- Walang Kapalit (Philippines, 2007)
- War of Money (South Korea, 2007)
- Warrior Baek Dong-soo (South Korea, 2011)
- Warrior Nun (2020–2022)
- We Broke Up (South Korea, 2015)
- Weak Hero Class 1 (South Korea, 2022)
- Wedding Impossible (South Korea, TBA)
- Weird Science (1994–1998)
- Welcome (South Korea, 2020)
- Wild Palms (US, 1993)
- Wind and Cloud (Taiwan, 2002)
- Wind and Cloud 2 (Taiwan, 2004)
- Woke (2020–2022)
- Work Later, Drink Now (South Korea, 2021)
- Your House Helper (South Korea, 2018)
- Yumi's Cells (South Korea, 2021)

== Animated ==
- The Adventures of Sam & Max: Freelance Police (Canada, 1997–1998)
- Angel's Friends (Italy, 2009–2010)
- Billy the Fish (UK, 1990)
- Blokhedz (2009)
- The Boxer (South Korea, TBA)
- The Boys Presents: Diabolical (2022)
- Brave Animated Series (2021–present, Taiwan)
- Bucky O'Hare and the Toad Wars (1991)
- Cadillacs and Dinosaurs (1993–1994)
- Cannon Busters (2019)
- Captain Pugwash (UK, 1957–1975, 1997)
- Captain Star (1997–1998)
- Chacha Bhatija (2016–2017)
- Chacha Chaudhary (2019)
- Chōyū Sekai (China, 2017)
- Cleopatra in Space (2020–present)
- Cocco Bill (Italy, 2001–2004)
- Cybersix (Argentina, 1999)
- Dan Dare: Pilot of the Future (UK, 2002)
- Dead End: Paranormal Park (2021–2022)
- The Deep (Canada, 2015–present)
- Dennis the Menace (UK):
  - Dennis the Menace & Gnasher (1996–1998)
  - Dennis the Menace & Gnasher (2009–2013)
  - Dennis & Gnasher: Unleashed! (2017–present)
- Diabolik (Italy, 2000–2001)
- DuckTales (1987–1990) (note: many episodes are based on comics by Carl Barks, while the character of Donald Duck which pre-date the comics).
- DuckTales (2017–2021)
- Evil or Live (China, 2017–2018)
- Ferdy the Ant (Czech Republic, 1984–1985)
- The Freak Brothers (2021)
- Fangbone! (2016–2017)
- The Fat Slags (UK, 2004)
- Fish Police (1992)
- Fix & Foxi and Friends (Germany, 2000)
- Gaturro, la serie (Argentina, 2014)
- The God of High School (South Korea, 2020)
- Gosu (South Korea, TBA)
- Hazbin Hotel (2024–present) – Series loosely based on the web comic ZooPhobia.
- Hilda (2018–present)
- Il mondo di Stefi (Italy, 2008)
- John Callahan's Quads! (2001–2002)
- Kagagi (Canada, 2014)
- Kampung Boy (Malaysia, 1999–2000)
- Kayko and Kokosh (Poland, 2021–present)
- Kipo and the Age of Wonderbeasts (2020)
- The Last Kids on Earth (2019–present)
- Lookism (South Korea, 2022)
- Lupo Alberto (Italy, 1997–2002)
- Martin Mystery (Italy, 2003–2005)
- Monica and Friends
  - Monica's Gang (Brazil, 1976–present)
  - Vamos Brincar com a Turma da Mônica (Brazil, 2022–present)
- Monica Toy (Brazil, 2013–present)
- Monster Allergy (Italy, 2005–2009)
- Mortadelo y Filemón (Spain, 1966–1971)
- Mortadelo y Filemón (Spain, 1995)
- Mot (Spain/France, 1996–1997)
- Motu Patlu (2012–present)
- Muggy-Doo, Boy Fox (1965–1966)
- My 2 Cents
- Noblesse (South Korea, 2020)
- The Nutty Boy (Brazil, 2022)
- Pelswick (2000–2002)
- The Rocketeer (2019)
- Roger Mellie (UK, 1991)
- SamSam (2007–2013)
- Scary Larry (2010)
- School Shock (China, 2015)
- Sid the Sexist (UK, 1992)
- A Simple Thinking About Blood Type (South Korea, 2013)
- Snake 'n' Bacon (2009)
- Snorks (1984–1989)
- Spiff and Hercules (France, 1989)
- Sport Billy (1981)
- Strange Planet (2023)
- Supa Strikas (2008–2015)
- Super Duper Bunny League (2025–present)
- Superhero Kindergarten (2021–present)
- Tai Chi Chasers (2007–2008)
- Tales from the Cryptkeeper (1993–1994)
- Tear Along the Dotted Line (Italy, 2021)
- Teenage Mutant Ninja Turtles:
  - Teenage Mutant Ninja Turtles (1987–1996)
  - Teenage Mutant Ninja Turtles (2003–2009)
  - Teenage Mutant Ninja Turtles (2012–2017)
  - Rise of the Teenage Mutant Ninja Turtles (2018–present)
- This World Can't Tear Me Down (Italy, 2023)
- Terror Man (South Korea, TBA)
- The Tick (1994–1996)
- Tower of God (South Korea, 2020)
- Trese (Singapore, 2021)
- Uchūsen Sagittarius (Japan/Italy, 1986–1987)
- Ultramarine Magmell (Japan/China, 2019)
- Virtual Hero (Spain, 2018–2020)
- Wanderings of Sanmao (2006–present)
- Welcome to Eltingville (2002)
- Wendy (Germany, 2013)
- W.I.T.C.H. (Italy, 2004–2006)
- We Bare Bears (2015–2019)
- We Baby Bears (2022–present)
- World of Quest (2008–2009)
- Zipi y Zape (Spain, 2003)

== Manga ==
Manga are comics created in Japan.

=== Live action ===
- Absolute Boyfriend
  - Absolute Boyfriend (2008–2009)
  - Absolute Boyfriend (2012)
  - My Absolute Boyfriend
- Akuma-kun (1966–1967)
- Alice in Borderland (2020)
- Android Kikaider (1972–1973)
- Angel Heart (2015)
- Arakawa Under the Bridge (2011)
- Attack on Titan: Counter Rockets (2015)
- Balliamo e cantiamo con Licia (1988)
- The Banker (2019)
- Barefoot Gen (2007)
- Be-Bop High School (2004–2005)
- Blazing Transfer Students (2017)
- Boys Over Flowers
  - Boys Over Flowers (2005)
  - Boys Over Flowers (2009)
  - Boys Over Flowers 2 (2007)
  - Boys Over Flowers Season 2
  - F4 Thailand: Boys Over Flowers (2021–2022)
- Case Closed (2006–2012)
- Cat's Eyes (2024–present)
- City Hunter (2011)
- Cowboy Bebop (2021)
- Cutie Honey: The Live (2007–2008)
- Death Note (2015)
- The Devil Does Exist
  - Devil Beside You (2005)
  - It Started with a Kiss (2005–2006)
  - They Kiss Again (2007–2008)
  - Playful Kiss (2010)
  - Mischievous Kiss: Love in Tokyo (2013–2015)
- Dr. Jin (2012)
- Dragon Zakura
  - Dragon Zakura (2005)
  - Master of Study (2010)
- Drops of God
  - Kami no Shizuku (2009)
  - Drops of God (2023–present)
- Eko Eko Azarak (1997)
- Eko Eko Azarak -eye- (2004)
- Erased (2017)
- Gannibal (2022–present)
- Giant Robo (1967–1968)
- Gokusen (2002)
- Great Teacher Onizuka (1998–2014)
- Hana-Kimi
  - Hana-Kimi (2007–2008)
  - Hanazakarino Kimitachihe (2006–2007)
  - Hanazakari no Kimitachi e (2011)
  - Summer & Summer (2007)
  - To the Beautiful You (2012)
- Hayate the Combat Butler (2011)
- He's Expecting
- Hell Teacher Nube (2014)
- I Am Sam (2007)
- Inspector Zenigata (2017)
- Jin (2009–2011)
- Jōō (2005–2007)
- Kakegurui
  - Kakegurui (2018–2019)
  - Bet (2025–present)
- Kami no Shizuku (2009)
- Kantaro: The Sweet Tooth Salaryman (2019)
- Keep Your Hands Off Eizouken (2020)
- Kikaider 01 (1973–1974)
- Kimi ni Todoke (2023)
- Komi Can't Communicate (2021–present)
- Kotaro Lives Alone (2021)
- Laid-Back Camp(2020–2021)
- Late Night Restaurant (2015)
- The Laughing Salesman (1999)
- Liar Game
  - Liar Game (2007)
  - Liar Game: Season 2 (2009–2010)
- Licia dolce Licia (1987)
- Lone Wolf and Cub (1973–1976)
- Lone Wolf and Cub (Kozure Okami) (2002–2004)
- Love Buffet (2010–2011)
- Love me Licia (1986)
- Marmalade Boy (2001–2002)
- Mars (2004)
- Meteor Garden (2001)
- Meteor Garden (2018)
- Meteor Rain (2001–2002)
- Mighty Atom (1959–1960)
- Midnight Diner (2009–2019)
- Midnight Diner (2017)
- Million Yen Women (2017)
- Minna! ESPer Dayo! (2013)
- Mischievous Kiss: Love in Tokyo (2013)
- Mob Psycho 100 (2018)
- Momo Love (2009–2010)
- The Monster Kid (2010)
- My Dress-Up Darling (2024)
- My MVP Valentine (2002)
- MPD Psycho (Japan, 2000)
- Murai no Koi (2022)
- Naeil's Cantabile (2014)
- One Piece (2023)
- Ouran High School Host Club (2011)
- Ouroboros (2015)
- Parasyte: The Grey (TBA)
- Poor Prince (2001)
- The Prince of Tennis (2019)
- Prison School (2015)
- Romantic Princess (2007)
- The Rose (2003)
- Samurai Gourmet (2017)
- Scum's Wish (2017)
- Sexy Voice and Robo (2007)
- Short Program (2022)
- Skip Beat! (2011–2012)
- Smoking Gun (2014)
- Sukeban Deka (1985–1987)
- Take My Brother Away (2018)
- Teneramente Licia (1989)
- They Kiss Again (2007–2008)
- Today's Webtoon (2022)
- Tokyo Juliet (2006)
- Tomorrow (2002)
- Vampire Host (2004)
- The Way of the Househusband (2020)
- Wild 7 (1972–1973)
- xxxHolic (2014)
- Ya Boy Kongming! (2023)
- You're Under Arrest (2002)
- Yowamushi Pedal (2016)
- YuYu Hakusho (2023–present)
- Zetai Karesh (2008)

=== Animation ===
- 07-Ghost (2009)
- 21 Emon (1991–1992)
- 7 Seeds (2019)
- 801 T.T.S. Airbats (1994–1996)
- A Certain Scientific Railgun (2009–2010)
- Adventures of Kotetsu (1996–1997)
- After School Dice Club (2019–present)
- After the Rain (2018)
- Afro Samurai (2007)
- Ajin: Demi-Human (2016)
- Ai Yori Aoshi (2003)
- Aim for the Ace! (1973–1974)
- Air Gear (2006)
- Air Master (2003)
- Akame ga Kill! (2014)
- Akane-banashi (2026–present)
- Akane-chan (1968)
- Akazukin Chacha (1994–1995)
- Akuma-kun
  - Akuma-kun (1989–1990)
  - Akuma-kun (2023)
- All Purpose Cultural Cat Girl Nuku Nuku
  - All Purpose Cultural Cat Girl Nuku Nuku (1992–1993, 1998)
  - All Purpose Cultural Cat-Girl Nuku Nuku DASH! (1998)
- Altair: A Record of Battles (2017)
- The Amazing 3 (1965–1966)
- Android Kikaider: The Animation (2000–2001)
- Angel Heart (2001–2010)
- Anmitsu Hime: From Amakara Castle (1986–1987)
- Anonymous Noise (2017)
- Arakawa Under the Bridge (2010)
- Area 88 (2004)
- Arte (2020–present)
- Armed Girl's Machiavellism (2017)
- Asari-chan (1982–1983)
- Ask Dr. Rin! (2001–2002)
- Assassination Classroom (2015–2016)
- Astro Boy (1963–1966)
- Astro Boy (1980–1981)
- Astro Boy (2003–2004)
- Astro Fighter Sunred (2008–2009)
- Atashin'chi
  - Atashin'chi (2002–2009)
  - Shin Atashin'chi (2015–2016)
- Attack No. 1 (1969–1971)
- Attack on Titan (2013–present)
- Attack on Titan: Junior High (2015)
- Attacker You! (1984–1985)
- Atom: The Beginning (2017)
- Azuki-chan (1995–1998)
- Baban Baban Ban Vampire (2025–present)
- Babel II
  - Babel II (1973)
  - Babel II: Beyond Infinity (2001)
- Baby & Me (1996–1997)
- Back Street Girls (2018)
- Baki the Grappler (2001)
- Baki the Grappler (2018–present)
- Baki Hanma (2021)
- Bakusō Kyōdai Let's & Go!! (1996–1998)
- Banana Fish (2018)
- Barakamon (2014)
- Bastard!! (1992–1993)
- Bastard!! (2022)
- Battle B-Daman (2004)
- Battle B-Daman: Fire Spirits! (2005)
- Beastars (2019)
- Be-Bop High School (1990–1995)
- Beelzebub (2011–2012)
- Berserk (1997–1998)
- Berserk (2016–2017)
- Beyblade (2001–2019)
- Big X (1964–1965)
- Black Butler (2008–2010, 2014)
- Black Clover (2017—present)
- Black Jack
  - Black Jack (2004–2005)
  - Black Jack 21 (2006)
- Black Lagoon (2006)
- Black Torch (2026–present)
- Blade of the Immortal (2008)
- Blade of the Immortal -Immortal (2019—present)
- Blast of Tempest (2012–2013)
- Bleach
  - Bleach (2004–2012)
  - Bleach: Thousand-Year Blood War (2022–present)
- Blood Blockade Battlefront (2017)
- Blood Lad (2013)
- Blue Box (2024)
- Blue Lock (2022–present)
- Blue Exorcist (2017)
- Blue Seed (1994–1995)
- Blue Period (2021)
- Boarding School Juliet (2018)
- Bobobo-bo Bo-Bobo (2003–2005)
- Bonobono
  - Bonobono (1995–1996)
  - Bonobono (2016—present)
- Boruto: Naruto Next Generations (2017—present)
- Bow: Modern Dog Tales (1993–1994)
- Boys Over Flowers (1996–1997)
- Brave 10 (2012)
- B't X (1997)
- Bungo Stray Dogs (2016–2019)
- The Burning Wild Man (1988)
- Buso Renkin (2006–2007)
- Cagaster of an Insect Cage (2020)
- Call of the Night (2022–present)
- The Candidate for Goddess (2000)
- Candy Candy (1976–1979)
- Capeta (2005–2006)
- Captain (1983)
- Captain Tsubasa
  - Captain Tsubasa (1983–1986)
  - Captain Tsubasa J (1994–1995)
  - Captain Tsubasa: Road to 2002 (2001–2002)
  - Captain Tsubasa (2018–2024)
- Cardcaptor Sakura (1998–2000)
- Case Closed
  - Case Closed (1996–present)
  - Case Closed: The Culprit Hanzawa (2022)
  - Case Closed: Zero's Tea Time (2022)
  - Detective Conan: Police Academy Arc (2021–2023)
- Castle Town Dandelion (2015)
- Cat's Eye (1983–1984, 1984–1985, 2025–present))
- Cells at Work! (2019–present)
- Ceres, Celestial Legend (2000)
- Cestvs: The Roman Fighter (2021)
- Chainsaw Man (2022–present)
- Chibi Maruko-chan (1990–1992)
- Chibi Maruko-chan (1995—present)
- Chihayafuru (2011–2020)
- Chikkun Takkun (1984)
- Children of the Whales (2017)
- Chimpui (1989–1991)
- Chokkaku, the Stubborn Samurai Boy (1991)
- Chrono Crusade (2003–2004)
- The Chronicles of Kamui the Ninja (1969)
- Chronicles of the Going Home Club (2013)
- Chūka Ichiban!
  - Chūka Ichiban! (1997–1998)
  - Shin Chūka Ichiban! (2019–2021)
- Citrus (2018)
- City: The Animation (2025–present)
- City Hunter (1987–1991)
- Clamp School Detectives (1997)
- Claymore (2007)
- Clean Freak! Aoyama-kun (2017)
- Cobra the Animation (2010)
- Code:Breaker (2012)
- Colorful (1999)
- Cooking Papa (1992–1995)
- Coppelion (2013)
- Crayon Shin-chan (1992–present)
- Crayon Shin-chan Spin-off (2016–present)
- Croket! (2003–2005)
- Cromartie High School (2003–2004)
- Cutie Honey
  - Cutie Honey (1973–1974)
  - Cutie Honey Flash (1997–1998)
  - Cutie Honey Universe (2018)
- Cyborg 009 (1968)
- Cyborg 009 (1979–1980)
- Cyborg 009 (2001–2002)
- Cyborg 009 VS Devilman (2015–2016)
- Daily Lives of High School Boys (2012)
- Dame Oyaji (1974)
- Dandadan (2024)
- Dandelion (2026–)
- Dark Gathering (2023–present)
- Darwin's Game (2020)
- The Darwin Incident (2026–present)
- Dash! Yonkuro (1989–1990)
- Deadman Wonderland (2011)
- Dear Brother (1991–1992)
- Death Note (2006–2007)
- Delicious in Dungeon (TBA)
- The Demon Girl Next Door (2019–2022)
- Demon Lord Dante (2002)
- The Demon Prince of Momochi House (2024)
- Demon Slayer: Kimetsu no Yaiba (2019–present)
- Descendants of Darkness (2000)
- Detective School Q (2003–2004)
- Detectives These Days Are Crazy! (2025–present)
- Devilman (1972–1973)
- Devilman Crybaby (2018)
- Devil Lady (1998–1999)
- Devils' Line (2018)
- D.Gray-man (2006–2009)
- Di Gi Charat (1998–1999)
- Dimension W (2011–present)
- The Disastrous Life of Saiki Ki. (2016)
- DNA² (1994–1995)
- Dokaben (1976–1979)
- Dokkiri Doctor (1998–1999)
- Don Dracula (1982)
- Doraemon (1973)
- Doraemon (1979–2005)
- Doraemon (2005–present)
- Dorohedoro (2020)
- Dororo (1969)
- Dororo (2019)
- Dororon Enma-kun
  - Dororon Enma-kun (1973–1974)
  - Dororon Enma-kun MeeraMera (2011)
- Dr. Slump
- Dr. Slump Arale-chan (1981–1986)
- Dr. Slump (1997–1999)
- Dr. Stone (2019–present)
- Dragon Ball
  - Dragon Ball (1986–1989)
  - Dragon Ball Z (1989–1996)
  - Dragon Ball GT (1996–1997)
  - Dragon Ball Super (2015–2018)
  - Super Dragon Ball Heroes (2018–present)
  - Dragon Ball Daima (2024)
- Dragon Half (1993)
- Dragon Quest: The Adventure of Dai (1991–1992)
- Dragon Quest: The Adventure of Dai (2020–present)
- Dream Soldier Wing-Man (1984–1985)
- Drifters (2009–present)
- Drifting Dragons (2020)
- Dropkick on My Devil! (2018–2020)
- Duel Masters (2001–2011)
- Durarara! (2010–2016)
- Eat-Man (1997–1998)
- Edens Zero (2021–present)
- Eiken (2003–2004)
- Elfen Lied (2004)
- Erased (2016)
- Eyeshield 21 (2005–2008)
- The Fable (2024–present)
- Fairy Tail (2009–present)
- Fighting Foodons (2001–2002)
- Fire Force (2019–present)
- First Human Giatrus (1974–1976, 1996–1997)
- Fisherman Sanpei (1980–1982)
- Fist of the North Star (1987–1988, 2026–present)
- Flame of Recca (1997–1998)
- Food Wars!: Shokugeki no Soma (2015–present)
- From Me to You (2009–present)
- Fool Night (TBA)
- Forest of Piano (2018–2019)
- Frieren (2023–present)
- Fruits Basket (2001)
- Fruits Basket (2009–present)
- Fujimaru of the Wind (1964–1965)
- Fullmetal Alchemist
  - Fullmetal Alchemist (2003–2004)
  - Fullmetal Alchemist: Brotherhood (2009–2010)
- Fushigi Yûgi (1995–1996, 1996–1998, 2001–2002)
- Gachiakuta (2025–present)
- Gaki Deka (1989–1990)
- Galaxy Express 999 (1978–1981)
- Gallery Fake (2005)
- Gambalist! Shun (1996–1997)
- Game Center Arashi (1982)
- Ganbare Genki (1980–1981)
- Ganbare, Kickers! (1986–1987)
- Gangsta (2015)
- Gatapishi (1990–1991)
- GeGeGe no Kitarō (1968–1969, 1971–1972, 1985–1988, 1996–1998, 2007–2009, 2008, 2018–2020)
- Genshi Shonen Ryu (1971–1972)
- GetBackers (2002–2003)
- Getter Robo
  - Getter Robo (1974–1975)
  - New Getter Robo (2004)
- Ghost in the Shell
  - Ghost in the Shell: Stand Alone Complex (2002–2005)
  - Ghost in the Shell: Arise (2015)
  - Ghost in the Shell: SAC_2045 (2020—present)
  - Ghost in the Shell (TBA)
- Ghost Slayers Ayashi (2006–2007)
- Ghost Sweeper Mikami (1993–1994)
- Giant Robo
  - Giant Robo: The Day the Earth Stood Still
  - GR: Giant Robo (2007)
- Gigantor (1963–1966)
- Girls' Last Tour (2017)
- Gin Tama (2006–2018)
- Go! Go! Loser Ranger! (TBA)
- The Gokusen (2004)
- Glass Mask (1984, 2005–2006)
- Goku Midnight Eye (1989)
- Gokusen (2004)
- Golden Boy (1995–1996(
- Goldfish Warning! (1991–1992)
- Golgo 13 (2008–2009)
- Gon (2012–2015)
- Good Night World (2023)
- Grand Blue Dreaming (2020)
- Grander Musashi
  - Grander Musashi (1997)
  - Grander Musashi RV (1998)
- Great Teacher Onizuka (1999–2000)
- G-Taste (1999–2003)
- Gu Gu Ganmo (1984–1985)
- Gunsmith Cats (1995–1996)
- The Gutsy Frog (1972–1974)
- The Gutsy Frog 2 (1981–1982)
- Guyver: The Bioboosted Armor (2005–2006)
- Hai! Akko Desu (1988–1992)
- Haikara-San: Here Comes Miss Modern (1978–1979)
- Haikyu (2014–present)
- Hajime no Ippo
  - Hajime no Ippo: The Fighting! (2000−2002)
  - Hajime no Ippo: New Challenger (2009)
  - Hajime no Ippo: Rising (2013−2014)
- Hamtaro (2003–2013)
- Haō Taikei Ryū Knight (1994–1995)
- Happy Sugar Life (2018)
- Hareluya II Boy (1997)
- Harlock Saga (1998–1999)
- Harris no Kaze (1966–1967)
- Heavenly Delusion (2023–present)
- Helck (2023)
- Hellsing (2001–2002)
- Hellsing: Ultimate (2006–2012)
- Hell Teacher Nube (1996–1997)
- Hoero! Bun Bun (1980–1981)
- Heroman (2010)
- Hetalia: Axis Powers (2009–2016)(2021–present)
- Hiatari Ryōkō! (1987–1988)
- Hidamari no Ki (2000)
- High-Rise Invasion (2021)
- High School Girls (2006)
- High School! Kimengumi (1985–1987)
- High School Mystery: Gakuen Nanafushigi (1991–1992)
- Highschool of the Dead (2010)
- High Score Girl (2019–present)
- Hikari no Densetsu (1986)
- Hikaru no Go (2001–2003)
- Hime-chan's Ribbon (1992–1993)
- Himitsu no Akko-chan (1969–1970, 1988–1989, 1998–1999)
- Himouto! Umaru-chan (2015–2017)
- Hitorijime My Hero (2017)
- Holy Knight (2012)
- Honey Honey no Suteki na Bouken (1981–1982)
- Horimiya (2021–present)
- Hori-san Miyamura-kun (2012–2018)
- Hotel Inhumans (2025–)
- Hunter × Hunter
  - Hunter × Hunter (1999–2001)
  - Hunter × Hunter (2011–2014)
- Hyper Police (1997)
- Idaten Jump (2005–2006)
- Igano Kabamaru (1983–1984)
- Ikki Tousen (2003)
- Ikki Tousen (2007)
- Ikki Tousen (2008)
- Ikki Tousen (2010)
- Ikkyū-san (1978)
- Inakappe Taishō (1970–1972)
- Initial D
  - Initial D: First Stage (1998)
  - Initial D: Second Stage (1999–2000)
  - Initial D: Fourth Stage (2004–2006)
  - Initial D: Fifth Stage (2012–2013)
  - Initial D: Final Stage (2014)
- Inuyasha (2000–2004)
- Inuyasha: The Final Act (2009–2010)
- Inuyashiki (2017)
- Ironfist Chinmi (1988)
- Itazura na Kiss (1990–1999)
- Jarinko Chie (1981–1983)
- JoJo's Bizarre Adventure (2012–present)
- Juden Chan (2009)
- Jujutsu Kaisen (2020–2021)
- Jungle King Tar-chan (1993–1994)
- The Kabocha Wine (1982–1984)
- Kaguya-sama: Love Is War (2019–2022)
- Kaiju No. 8 (2024–2025)
- Kakegurui (2017–2019)
- Kakegurui Twin (2022)
- Karakuri Circus (2018–2019)
- Karate Master (1971–1977)
- Kariage-kun (1989–1990)
- Keep Your Hands Off Eizouken! (2020)
- Kekkaishi (2006–2008)
- Kemono Michi: Rise Up (2019–present)
- Kengan Ashura (2019)
- Kenichi: The Mightiest Disciple (2006–2014)
- Kero Kero Chime (1997)
- Kick no Oni (1970–1971)
- Kiko-chan's Smile (1996–1997)
- Kill Blue (2026–present)
- Killing Bites (2018)
- Kimagure Orange Road (1987–1988)
- Kimba the White Lion (1965–1966)
- Kinnikuman
  - Kinnikuman (1983–1986)
  - Kinnikuman: Scramble for the Throne (1991–1992)
  - Kinnikuman: Second Generation (2002–2003)
  - Kinnikuman Second Generation: Ultimate Muscle 2 (2006)
  - Kinnikuman Perfect Origin Arc (2024–present)
- The Kindaichi Case Files
  - The Kindaichi Case Files (1997–2000)
  - The Kindaichi Case Files R (2014–2016)
- Kiteretsu Daihyakka (1988–1996)
- Kobato (2009–2010)
- KochiKame (1996–2004, 2005–2016)
- Kodocha (1996–1998)
- Kokkoku (2018)
- Komi Can't Communicate (2021)
- Kobo, the Li'l Rascal (1992–1994)
- Kotaro Lives Alone (2022)
- Kōya no Shōnen Isamu (1973–1974)
- Kunimatsu-sama no Otoridai! (1971–1972)
- Kuroko's Basketball (2012–2015)
- Lady!!
  - Lady Lady!! (1987–1988)
  - Hello! Lady Lynn (1988–1989)
- Land of the Lustrous (2017)
- The Laughing Salesman
  - The Laughing Salesman (1989–1992)
  - The Laughing Salesman NEW (2017)
- Legend of Heavenly Sphere Shurato (1989–1990)
- Leo the Lion (1966–1967)
- Levius (2019–present)
- :Li'l Miss Vampire Can't Suck Right (2025–)
- Little Pollon (1982–1983)
- Little Wansa (1973)
- Love and Lies (2017)
- Love Hina
  - Love Hina (2000)
  - Love Hina Again (2002)
- Love Me, My Knight (1983–1984)
- Lupin the Third
  - Lupin the 3rd Part I (1971–1972)
  - Lupin the 3rd Part II (1977–1980)
  - Lupin the 3rd Part III (1984–1985)
  - Lupin the Third: The Woman Called Fujiko Mine (2012)
  - Lupin the 3rd Part IV: The Italian Adventure (2015–2016)
  - Lupin the 3rd Part 5 (2018)
  - Lupin the 3rd Part 6 (2021–2022)
- Made in Abyss (2017)
- Magi: The Labyrinth of Magic (2012–2013)
- Magi: Adventure of Sinbad (2016)
- Magical Circle Guru Guru
  - Magical Circle Guru Guru (1994–1995)
  - Doki Doki Legend Magical Circle Guru Guru (2000)
  - Magical Circle Guru Guru (2017)
- Magical Girl Site (2018)
- Magical Hat (1989–1990)
- Magical Taruruto (1988–1992)
- Magilumiere Magical Girls Inc. (2024–present)
- Maid Sama (2010)
- Maison Ikkoku (1986–1988)
- Mama Loves the Poyopoyo-Saurus (1995–1996)
- Mama wa Shōgaku 4 Nensei (1992)
- Mami the Psychic (1987–1989)
- Mamoette Shugogetten (1998–1999)
- Manmaru The Ninja Penguin (1997–1998)
- March Comes In like a Lion (2016–2018)
- MAR (2005–2007)
- Marmalade Boy (1994–1995)
- The Marshmallow Times (2004–2005)
- Marude Dameo (1991–1992)
- Marvelous Melmo (1971–1972)
- Mashle: Magic and Muscles (2023–2024)
- Master Keaton (1998–1999)
- Master of Mosquiton (1996–1997)
- Mazinger Z (1972–1974)
- Medalist (2025–present)
- Megalo Box (2018)
- Mew Mew Power (2002–2003)
- Microman: The Small Giant (1999)
- Miami Guns (2000)
- Microid S (1973)
- Midori Days (2004)
- Midori no Makibaō (1996–1997)
- Mikan Enikki (1992–1993)
- Miracle Giants Dome-kun (1989–1990)
- Mirai Keisatsu Urashiman (1983)
- Miss Machiko (1981–1983)
- Mission: Yozakura Family (2024–present)
- Mister Ajikko (1987–1989)
- Mix (2019—present)
- Miyuki (1983–1984)
- Mizuiro Jidai (1996–1997)
- Mob Psycho 100 (2016–present)
- Mobile Suit Gundam-san (2014)
- Mojacko (1995–1997)
- Mon Colle Knights (2000)
- Monkey Turn
  - Monkey Turn (2004)
  - Monkey Turn V (2004)
- Monster (2004–2005)
- The Monster Kid (1968–1969, 1980–1982)
- Mōretsu Atarō (1969–1970, 1990)
- Mr. Tonegawa: Middle Management Blues (2018)
- Murai in Love (2024–present)
- Musashi no Ken (1985–1986)
- Mushishi (2005–2016, 2014)
- My Deer Friend Nokotan (2024)
- My Dress-Up Darling (2022–present)
- My Girlfriend is Shobitch (2015–2019)
- My Hero Academia
  - My Hero Academia (2016–present)
  - My Hero Academia: Vigilantes (TBA)
- My Love Story!! (2015)
- My Monster Secret (2015)
- The Mythical Detective Loki Ragnarok (2003)
- Nagasarete Airantō (2007)
- Nana (2006–2007)
- Nangoku Shōnen Papuwa-kun (1992–1993, 2003–2004)
- Naruto (2002–2017)
- Natsume's Book of Friends (2005–present)
- Neighborhood Story (1995–1996)
- Neuro: Supernatural Detective (2007–2008)
- The New Adventures of Gigantor (1980–1981)
- The New Adventures of Kimba The White Lion (1989–1990)
- The New Adventures of Speed Racer (1993)
- New Angel (1994–1995)
- New Cutie Honey (1994–1995)
- NieA under 7 - domestic poor @nimation (2000)
- Ninja v. Gokudo (2025–present)
- Ninja Hattori-kun
  - Ninja Hattori-kun (1981–1987)
  - Ninja Hattori-kun Returns (2013–present)
- Ninku (1995–1996)
- Nintama Rantarō (1993—present)
- Nippon Sangoku (2026–present)
- Nisekoi (2014–2015)
- No Guns Life (2019–present)
- Nono-chan (2001–2002)
- Noragami (2015)
- Norakuro
  - Norakuro (1970–1971)
- Notari Matsutarō
  - Notari Matsutarō (1990–1991)
  - Rowdy Sumo Wrestler Matsutaro!! (2014)
- Norakuro-kun (1987–1988)
- Nura: Rise of the Yokai Clan (2010)
- Nurse Angel Ririka SOS (1995–1996)
- Obake no Q-Tarō
  - Obake no Q-Tarō (1965–1967)
  - Shin Obake no Q-Tarō (1971–1972)
  - Obake no Q-Tarō (1985–1987)
- Obocchama-kun (1989–1992)
- Oh! Family (1986–1987)
- Ohayō! Spank (1981–1982)
- Oishinbo (1988–1992)
- Ojamanga Yamada-kun (1980–1982)
- One Piece
  - One Piece (1999–present)
  - The One Piece (TBA)
- One-Punch Man (2015–present)
- The Ones Within (2019–present)
- Orb: On the Movements of the Earth (2024)
- Ore wa Teppei (1977–1978)
- Oshi no Ko (2023–present)
- Osomatsu-kun
  - Osomatsu-kun (1966–1967)
  - Osomatsu-kun (1988–1989)
  - Mr. Osomatsu (2015–2021)
- Ouran High School Host Club (2006)
- Outlaw Star (1998)
- Pandora in the Crimson Shell: Ghost Urn (2016)
- Parasyte -the maxim- (2014–2015)
- Patalliro!
  - Boku Patalliro! (1982–1983)
  - Patalliro! Saiyuki (2005)
- Patlabor: The TV Series (1989–1990)
- Peach Girl (2005)
- Perman (1965–1968, 1983–1985)
- Persia, the Magic Fairy (1984–1985)
- Pet (2020)
- Pet Shop of Horrors (1999)
- Phantom Thief Jeanne (1999–2000)
- Phoenix (1987, 2004, 2020, 2023)
- Pita-Ten (2002)
- Plawres Sanshiro (1983–1984)
- Please Excuse My Younger Brothers (2026–present)
- Plunderer (2020—present)
- Pluto (2023)
- Poco's Udon World (2016)
- Pokonyan! (1993–1996)
- Pop Team Epic (2018)
- The Prince of Tennis (2001–2012)
- Princess Knight (1967–1968)
- Prison School (2015)
- The Promised Neverland (2019—present)
- Psychic Squad (2008–2009)
- Puniru Is a Cute Slime (2024–present)
- Queen Millennia (1981–1982)
- The Quintessential Quintuplets (2019)
- The Qwaser of Stigmata
  - The Qwaser of Stigmata (2010)
  - The Qwaser of Stigmata II (2011)
- Ragna Crimson (2024–2025)
- Rainbow: Nisha Rokubō no Shichinin (2010)
- Rainbow Sentai Robin (1966–1967)
- Ramen Fighter Miki (2006)
- The Ramparts of Ice (2026–present)
- Ranma ½ (1989–1992, 2024–present)
- Rave Master (2001–2002)
- Ray the Animation (2006)
- Real Girl (2018–2019)
- Red Drive (2008)
- Reborn! (2006–2010)
- Record of Ragnarok (2021)
- Revolutionary Girl Utena (1997)
- Rising Impact (2024–present)
- Rock Is a Lady's Modesty (2025)
- Romantic Killer (2022)
- Ronin Warriors (1988–1989)
- Rooster Fighter (2026–)
- The Rose of Versailles (1979–1980)
- Ruri Rocks (2025–)
- Rurouni Kenshin
  - Rurouni Kenshin (1996–1998)
  - Rurouni Kenshin (2023–present)
- Sabu to Ichi Torimono Hikae (1968–1969)
- Saiki K. (2016–2018)
- Saiyuki (2000–2017)
- Sailor Moon
  - Sailor Moon (1992–1997)
  - Sailor Moon Crystal (2014–2016)
- Saint Seiya
  - Saint Seiya (1986–1989)
  - Saint Seiya: Hades (2002–2008)
  - Saint Seiya: The Lost Canvas (2009–2011)
  - Saint Seiya Omega (2012–2014)
  - Saint Seiya: Soul of Gold (2015)
  - Saint Seiya: Saintia Shō (2018–2019)
  - Knights of the Zodiac: Saint Seiya (2019—present)
- Sakamoto Days (TBA)
- Sakigake!! Otokojuku (1988)
- Sakura Diaries (1997)
- Sally the Witch
  - Sally the Witch (1966–1968)
  - Sally the Witch 2 (1989–1991)
- Samurai Deeper Kyo (2002)
- Sanda (2025–present)
- Sand Land (2024–present)
- Sarutobi Ecchan (1971–1972)
- Sasuga no Sarutobi (1982–1984)
- Sazae-san (1969—present)
- School Rumble
  - School Rumble (2004–2005)
  - School Rumble: 2nd Semester (2006)
- Scum's Wish (2017)
- Sennin Buraku (1963–1964)
- Seraph of the End (2015)
- The Seven Deadly Sins
  - The Seven Deadly Sins (2016)
  - Four Knights of the Apocalypse (2023–present)
- Sexy Commando Gaiden (1998)
- Sgt. Frog (2004–2011)
- Shaman King
  - Shaman King (2001–2002)
  - Shaman King (2021–present)
  - Shaman King: Flowers (2024)
- Shoot!
  - Aoki Densetsu Shoot! (1993–1994)
  - Shoot! Goal to the Future (2022–present)
- Silent Möbius (1998)
- Silver Fang -The Shooting Star Gin- (1986)
- Shura no Toki – Age of Chaos (2004)
- Slam Dunk (1993–1996)
- Smoking Behind the Supermarket with You (2026–)
- Snow White with the Red Hair (2015–2016)
- The Song of Tentomushi (1974–1976)
- Sora no Manimani (2009)
- Sorcerer Hunters (1995–1996)
- Soul Eater (2008–2009)
- Soul Eater Not! (2014)
- Soul Hunter (1999)
- Soul Hunter (2018)
- Space Ace (1965–1966)
- Space Cobra (1982–1983)
- Space Pirate Captain Harlock (1978–1979)
- Speed Racer (1967–1968)
- Speed Racer: The Next Generation (2008–2013)
- Speed Racer X (1997)
- Spriggan (2022—present)
- Spy x Family (2022–present)
- A Star Brighter Than the Sun (2025–present)
- Star of the Giants (1968–1971)
- Steel Angel Kurumi
  - Steel Angel Kurumi (1999–2000)
  - Steel Angel Kurumi 2 (2001)
- Stop!! Hibari-kun! (1983–1984)
- The Summer Hikaru Died (2025–present)
- Summer Time Rendering (2022)
- Suraj: The Rising Star (2012–2013)
- Suzuka (2005)
- Sword Gai: The Animation (2018)
- Tactics (2004–2005)
- Taishō Baseball Girls (2009)
- Take My Brother Away (2017–2019)
- Tasuke, the Samurai Cop (1990–1991)
- Teasing Master Takagi-san (2018–2019)
- Tenjho Tenge (2004)
- Tensai Bakabon
  - Tensai Bakabon (1971–1972)
  - Ganso Tensai Bakabon (1975–1977)
  - Heisei Tensai Bakabon (1990)
  - Rerere no Tensai Bakabon (1999–2000)
  - Shinya! Tensai Bakabon (2018)
- Terra Formars (2014–2016)
- Tetsujin 28-go
  - Tetsujin 28 FX (1992–1993)
  - Tetsujin 28-go (2004)
- Thermae Romae (2012)
- Thermae Romae Novae (2022)
- This Art Club Has a Problem! (2016)
- This Ugly yet Beautiful World (2004)
- Those Who Hunt Elves
  - Those Who Hunt Elves (1996)
  - Those Who Hunt Elves 2 (1997)
- The Three-Eyed One (1990–1991)
- Thunder 3 (TBA)
- Tiger Mask
  - Tiger Mask (1969–1971)
  - Tiger Mask II characters (1981–1982)
  - Tiger Mask W (2016–2017)
- T.P BON (2024—present)
- To Your Eternity (2021—present)
- Toilet-Bound Hanako-kun (2020)
- Tokimeki Tonight (1982–1983)
- Tokko (2006)
- Tokyo Ghoul (2018)
- Tokyo Mew Mew
  - Tokyo Mew Mew (2002–2003)
  - Tokyo Mew Mew New (2022–present)
- Tokyo Revengers (2021)
- Tonbo! (2024–present)
- Tonde Burin (1994–1995)
- Tomorrow's Joe (1980–1981)
- Toriko (2011–2014)
- Tottemo! Luckyman (1994–1995)
- Touch (1985–1987)
- Toward the Terra (2007)
- Triage X (2015)
- Trigun
  - Trigun (1998)
  - Trigun Stampede (2023–present)
- Triton of the Sea (2002)
- Tsuide ni Tonchinkan (1987–1988)
- Tsurupika Hagemaru (1988–1989)
- Übel Blatt (2025–present)
- Undead Unluck (2023)
- Uncle from Another World (2022–2023)
- Ultimate Muscle (2002–2006)
- UFO Ultramaiden Valkyrie (2002–2006)
- Ultra B (1987–1989)
- Ultraman (2019–present)
- UQ Holder! (2017––2018)
- Urusei Yatsura
  - Urusei Yatsura (1981–1986)
  - Urusei Yatsura (2022–2024)
- Uzumaki (2024)
- The Vampire Dies in No Time (2021–2023)
- Vampire Knight (2008)
- Vampire Princess Miyu (1997–1998)
- Vinland Saga (2019–present)
- Violinist of Hameln (1996–1997)
- Virtual Hero (2018–2020)
- Vixens (1995–1996)
- Wandering Sun (1971)
- The Way of the Househusband (2021–present)
- We Never Learn (2019)
- Wedding Peach (1995–1996)
- Welcome to the Ballroom (2017)
- Welcome to Demon School! Iruma-kun (2020–present)
- What's Michael? (1988–1989)
- Whistle! (2002–2003)
- Wild 7 (2002)
- Wild Knights Gulkeeva (1995)
- Wind Breaker (2024–2025)
- Witch Watch (2025–)
- World Trigger (2014–2022)
- World War Blue (2012–2013)
- Wotakoi: Love Is Hard for Otaku (2018–2021)
- X (2001–2002)
- xxxHolic (2006–2008)
- Ya Boy Kongming! (2022)
- Yaiba (1993–1994, 2025–)
- Yakyū-kyō no Uta (1977–1979)
- Yawara! A Fashionable Judo Girl! (1989–1992)
- Yoiko (1998–1999)
- You're Under Arrest
  - You're Under Arrest (1996–1997)
  - You're Under Arrest Special (1999)
  - You're Under Arrest 2 (2001)
  - You're Under Arrest: Full Throttle (2007–2008)
- Your Lie in April (2014–2015)
- Yowamushi Pedal (2013–2018)
- Yu-Gi-Oh! (1998–2002)
- Yu Yu Hakusho (1992–1994)
- YuruYuri (2011)
- Zatch Bell! (2003–2006)
- Zom 100: Bucket List of the Dead (2023)
- Zombie-Loan (2007)

== Series about comics ==
- According to Jim (2001–2009) – Andy, one of the main characters, is a fan of comics.
- Alien Dawn (2013–2014) – Series about a boy investigating alien activity and conspiracy theories that inspired his missing father's comic book.
- Almost Heroes (2011) – Sitcom about two brothers running their late father's comic book store.
- American Horror Story: Cult (2017) – A part of the American Horror Story anthology. It features the character Twisty the Clown in a comic book.
- A Pup Named Scooby-Doo (1988–1991) – Part of the Scooby-Doo franchise. In the series, Scooby and Shaggy are fans of the comic book "Commander Cool and Mellow Mutt." They often dress like the characters in the series.
- Are You Afraid of the Dark?: Curse of the Shadows (2020) – Jai, a member of the Midnight Society, is heavily into comic books. His favorite book is "The Ghastly Grinner."
- Bakuman (2008–2012) – Anime series about two teenage manga creators.
- Best.Worst.Weekend.Ever. (2018) – A group of teenagers attempt to sneak into a comic book convention to show their homemade comic book to their favorite comic book author.
- Big Bad Beetleborgs (1996–1998) – A group of kids are transformed into their favorite comic book superheroes.
- The Big Bang Theory (2007–2019) – Most of the main characters are comic book fans. Nearly every episode references comic books.
- Bless the Harts (2019–present) – One of the main characters, Violet Hart, is an aspiring artist who makes her own comics.
- Blood Ties (2007) – The main protagonist, Henry Fitzroy, works as a graphic novelist.
- Bob (1992–1993) – Sitcom about a comic book creator.
- The Bureau of Magical Things (2018–present) – One of the main characters, Peter, is a comic book fan.
- The Cape (2011) – An honest cop becomes a superhero based on his son's favorite comic book character.
- Caroline in the City (1995–1999) – Sitcom about a comic strip artist.
- The Casagrandes (2019–2022) – Like its predecessor, The Loud House, the series' background art is heavily influenced by comic strips.
- The Comic Artist and His Assistants: The Animation (2014) – Anime about a manga author.
- The Comic Book Greats (1991–1992) – Docuseries hosted by Stan Lee. The series interviewed various comic artists.
- Comic Book Men (2012–2018) – A reality TV series centering on Jay and Silent Bob's Secret Stash: a comic book store owned by filmmaker Kevin Smith.
- Comic Girls (2018) – Anime about a group of girls determined to make the best manga.
- Comic Party (2001) – Anime about two friends who visit a Comic Party Convention.
- Comic Party Revolution (2005) - Sequel to Comic Party.
- Comic Store Heroes (2012) – Reality series setting in Midtown Comics.
- The Comic Strip (1987) – Animated series featuring segments of original cartoons in the form of a comic strip.
- Con Man (2015–2017) – Web comedy about a struggling actor eking out a living by attending comic book conventions.
- Corner Gas (2004–2009) – The main character is an avid comic book fan.
- Crazy Fun Park (2023–present) – The main protagonist, Chester, aspires to be a graphic novelist.
- Creepshow (2019) – Horror anthology centering on a comic book.
- Dark Oracle (2004–2006) – Teen drama centering on a comic book.
- Detention (1999–2000) – One of the main characters, Jim Kim, is an obsessed comic book fan. He references comic books in each episode.
- Doug (1991–1999) – The main protagonist, Doug, aspires to be a comic book artist. He draws his own comic book featuring his alter-ego, Quilman.
- Downtown (1999) – The main protagonist, Alex Hanson, collects comics and toys. He is infatuated with Serena- a goth girl who works at a comic store called Starbase 12.
- Dragons of Wonderhatch (2023–2024)- Posuka Demizu, a manga artist, works on the series as both character designer and concept artist.
- The Epic Tales of Captain Underpants (2018–present) – Series about two boys who make their own comics. They hypnotize their principal into becoming their comic creation.
- éX-Driver (2000–2001) – OVA series developed by manga artist Kōsuke Fujishima.
- The Fairly OddParents (2001–2017) – The series features a reoccurring character, the Crimson Chin: a comic book superhero.
- The Fairly OddParents: A New Wish (2024–present) – Hazel, the main protagonist, is a fan of manga. Her favorite manga is Prime Meridian Love.
- Fanboy & Chum Chum (2009–2012) – Animated series about two comic book fans.
- The Franchise (2024) – Comedy series about the making of a superhero movie based on a comic.
- Geeking Out (2016) – Series exploring comic books and other forms of nerd culture.
- Groovie Goolies (1970–1972) – Animated series featuring Archie Comics' Sabrina Spellman as a supporting character.
- Hazbin Hotel (2017–present) – Three of the characters (Alastor, Angel Dust and Husk) were originally from the series creator's webcomic ZooPhobia.
- Helluva Boss (2020–present) – Animated series created by web comic artist Vivienne Medrano.
- Hero Inside (2023–present) – Animated series about comic book superheroes coming to life.
- Heroes (2006–2010) – Series told in the form of a comic book.
- Heroes Reborn (2015) – Series told in the form of a comic book.
- Hey Dude (1989–1991) – One of the ranchers, Buddy, is a fan of comics. Another rancher, Danny, makes his own comic strip.
- High School USA! (2013–2015) – Parody of Archie Comics.
- I'm a Virgo – Cootie, the main character, reads comic books based on his favorite superhero, the Hero.
- The Imperfects (2022) – One of the main characters, Juan Ruiz, is a graphic novelist.
- Invader Zim (2001–2002) – Animated series created by comic artist Jhonen Vasquez.
- I Woke Up a Vampire (2023) – Kev, one of the main characters, is a comic fan who works at a comic book store. He uses comics as a source to research supernatural beings.
- Junji Ito Maniac: Japanese Tales of the Macabre (2023) – Series with episodes adapted from manga by artist Junji Ito.
- Keep It in the Family (1980–1983) – Britcom about a mischievous cartoonist.
- Kid Cosmic (2020) – Animated series about a comic book fan who becomes a superhero. The format is inspired by comic books.
- Kirk (1995–1997) – Sitcom about an illustrator taking care of his family.
- The Life and Times of Juniper Lee (2005–2007) – Animated series created by comic artist Judd Winick.
- The Loud House (2016–present)– The main character, Lincoln Loud, is an avid comic book fan. The series' background art is heavily inspired by comic strips.
- Masters of Horror (2005–2007)– The episode, Jenifer, is based on a story from the horror comic Creepy by Bruce Jones and Bernie Wrightson.
- Meteor Garden II (2022) – Sequel to the television series, Metero Garden, which is based on a manga.
- McGee and Me! (1989–1995) – Series about an aspiring cartoonist having adventures with his creation while growing in his Christian faith.
- Mighty Med (2013–2015) – Sitcom about two teenaged comic fans who work as doctors in a superhero hospital.
- Miraculous: Tales of Ladybug & Cat Noir (2015–present) – Two characters, Marc and Nathaniel, make their own Ladybug manga.
- Mission Hill (1999–2002) – Animated sitcom about an aspiring cartoonist who lives with his teenaged brother in a big city-loft.
- Monthly Girls' Nozaki-kun (2014) - A high school girl falls for a manga artist.
- My Secret Identity (1988–1991) – The main character, Andrew Clements, is an avid comic fan.
- My Wife and Kids (2001–2005) – One of the main characters, Junior, is heavily involved with comic books.
- Nerds and Monsters (2014–2016) – Most of the main characters are heavily into nerd culture, including comics. The characters are often seen reading comics.
- Once a Hero (1987) – Series about a comic book superhero coming to life.
- Primos (2024–2025) – Tater Ramirez Humphrey, the main protagonist, reads and draws comics and manga.
- Private Psycho Lesson (1996) – Anime mini-series created by manga artist U-Jin.
- Project Mc2 (2015–2017) – One of the main characters, Devon D'Marco, is a graphic novelist.
- Queer as Folk (2000–2005) – One of the characters, Michael Novotny is an avid comic book fan. He reads comics, attends conventions, and eventually owns a comic store and writes his own comic.
- The Real Ghostbusters - (1986–1991) – One of the main characters, Ray Stantz, is a comic book fan. His favorite comic book character is the superhero, Captain Steel, who was featured in two episodes.
- Recess (1997–2001) – The main characters are fans of the comic book Senor Fusion.
- Re:Creators (2017) – Anime series about comic characters coming to life.
- The Replacements (2006–2009) – Two orphans use an ad in a comic book to replace things.
- Rocko's Modern Life (1993–1996) – The main protagonist, Rocko, works at a comic book shop.
- Roseanne (1988–2018) – Two of the main characters, David Healy and Darlene Conner, were graphic novelists. David was the artist and Darlene was the writer.
- Scorpion (2014–2018) – One of the main characters, Sly, reads comics. His favorite comic book is an original character named "Super Fun Guy."
- Scream (2015–2019) – Two of the main characters, Noah Foster and Stavo Acosta, are comic fans. Stavo draws his own horror-themed comics. Later, Noah and Stavo partner up to make their own graphic novel.
- The Simpsons (1989–present) – The series features a reoccurring character, Comic Book Guy. He is a comic book collector who owns the local comic book store. He often criticizes and references comic books.
- The Stanley Dynamic (2015–2017) – One of the main characters, Lane Stanely, works as a cartoonist.
- Star vs. the Forces of Evil (2015–2019) – Series heavily influenced by manga such as Sailor Moon and Dragon Ball Z.
- Stuart Fails to Save the Universe (2026–present) – Spin-off off The Big Bang Theory focusing on comic book store owner Stuart BLoom.
- Supernatural Academy (2022) – One of the main characters, Mischa, is a comic artist. She also has a best friend who is heavily into comics.
- Thus Spoke Kishibe Rohan (2020) – Anime series about an eccentric manga artist.
- Thus Spoke Kishibe Rohan (2020) – Live-action series about an eccentric manga artist.
- Tear Along the Dotted Line (2021) – Animated sitcom about a cartoonist in Rome and an imaginary armadillo. The series is created by comic artist Zerocalcare.
- Too Close for Comfort (1980–1987) – Sitcom about a conservative cartoonist and his family.
- The Troop (2009–2013) – One of the main characters is an aspiring comic artist.
- Utopia (2013–2014) – Sci-fi series centering on a group of fans discovering that their favorite comic book is based on reality.
- Utopia (2020) – Series based on the British television series of the same name. The series centers on a group of comic book fans.
- Warped! (2022) – Sitcom centered in a comic book store.
- We Baby Bears (2022) – Prequel to the series We Bare Bears, which is based on a webcomic.
- The Weekenders (2001–2002) – Tino Tontini is obsessed with the comic book "Captain Dreadnought".
- Wild West C.O.W.-Boys of Moo Mesa (1992–1993) – Animated series created by comic artist Ryan Brown.
- Woke (2020–2022) – Sitcom about a black comic book artist whose perception on life is changed after being unjustly assaulted by policemen. The series is also based on a comic strip.
- Yashahime: Princess Half-Demon (2020–present) – Sequel to the series Inuyasha. which is based on a manga.
- Yo Gabba Gabba! (2007–2015) – Series featuring a segment of a comic hero named Super Martian Robot Girl. The segment was drawn by comic artist Evan Dorkin.
- Young Sheldon (2017–2024) – Two characters, Sheldon Cooper and Tam Nguyen, are comic fans. They shop at a store called "Big City Comix" where Sheldon's sister, Missy, eventually works.
- Zero (2021) – Omar, the male lead protagonist, is an aspiring manga artist.

== See also ==
- List of comic-based television episodes directed by women
- List of television programs based on films
- List of superhero television series
- List of television series based on toys
- List of television programs based on video games
- List of comics based on television programs
- List of films based on comic strips
- List of films based on comics
