= List of television series based on toys =

This is a list of television programs based on toys, board games, and trading cards.

== Docu-series ==
- The Toys That Made Us

== Live-action ==
- Captain Power and the Soldiers of the Future (1987–1988)
- Clue (2011)
- Holly Hobbie (2018–2022)

== Animated ==
- The Adventures of Raggedy Ann and Andy (1988)
- The Adventures of Teddy Ruxpin (1986–1987) - Atkinson Film-Arts, DIC Entertainment
- Alienators: Evolution Continues (2001–2002) - DIC Entertainment, The Montecito Picture Company, DreamWorks Television, Columbia TriStar Television, Dentsu
- Bakugan Battle Brawlers (2007–2008) - Sega Fave, Spin Master
- Barbie: Life in the Dreamhouse (2012–2015) - Mattel
- Bratz
  - Bratz (2005–2008)
  - Bratzillaz (2012–2013)
- Care Bears
  - Care Bears (1985)
  - The Care Bears Family (1986–1988) - Nelvana, C.B.I.S. Productions, American Greetings
  - Care Bears: Adventures in Care-a-lot (2007–2010)
  - Care Bears: Welcome to Care-a-Lot (2012)
- Challenge of the GoBots (1984–1985) - Hanna-Barbera Productions, Tonka Corporation, Wang Film Productions
- COPS (1988)
- Dino-Riders (1988) - Marvel Productions, Tyco Toys, Hanho Heung-Up, AKOM Productions
- G.I. Joe: A Real American Hero (1983–1986) - Hasbro
- The Glo Friends (1986–1987)
- He-Man and the Masters of the Universe (1983–1984) - Filmation
- Hello Kitty and Friends (1989–2000)
- Hot Wheels – Mattel
  - Hot Wheels (1969–1971) - Ken Snyder Properties, Pantomime Pictures
  - Hot Wheels Battle Force 5 (2009–2012)
  - Hot Wheels: Ultimate Challenge (2023)
  - Hot Wheels Let's Race (2024–2025)
- Jayce and the Wheeled Warriors (1985) - DIC Entertainment, ICC TV Productions, Ltd.
- Jem and the Holograms (1985–1988) - Hasbro
- Lazer Tag Academy (1986) – Worlds of Wonder
- Lego
  - Hero Factory (2010–2014)
  - Ninjago (2011–2022)
  - Legends of Chima (2013–2014)
  - Mixels (2014–2016)
  - Lego Star Wars: Droid Tales (2015)
  - Nexo Knights (2015–2017)
  - Lego Star Wars: The Resistance Rises (2016)
  - Lego Star Wars: The Freemaker Adventures (2016–2017)
  - Unikitty! (2017–2020)
  - Lego Jurassic World: The Secret Exhibit (2018)
  - Lego Jurassic World: Legend of Isla Nublar (2019)
  - Ninjago: Dragons Rising (2023–present)
  - Lego Star Wars: Rebuild the Galaxy (2024–2025)
- Littlest Pet Shop - Hasbro
  - Littlest Pet Shop (1995)
  - Littlest Pet Shop (2012–2016)
  - Littlest Pet Shop: A World of Our Own (2018–2019)
- M.A.S.K. (1985–1986) - DIC Entertainment, ICC TV Productions
- Max Steel - Mattel
  - Max Steel (2000–2002)
  - Max Steel (2013–2017)
- Maxie's World (1989) - Hasbro
- My Little Pony - Hasbro
  - My Little Pony (1984–1987)
  - My Little Pony Tales (1992)
  - My Little Pony: Friendship Is Magic (2010–2019)
  - My Little Pony: Pony Life (2020–2021)
- My Pet Monster (1987) – Saban Brands
- Pound Puppies
  - Pound Puppies (1986–1987) - Hanna-Barbera Productions, Tonka Corporation
  - Pound Puppies (2010–2013)
- Paw Patrol (2013–present) - Guru Studio, Spin Master
- Mr. Potato Head
  - Potato Head Kids (1986–1987)
  - The Mr. Potato Head Show (1998–1999)
- Robotix (1985)
- Sectaurs (1985) – Coleco
- She-Ra: Princess of Power (1985–1987) - Filmation
- Rainbrow Brite (1984–1986) - DIC Entertainment
- Rambo: The Force of Freedom (1986) - Ruby-Spears Enterprises, Carolco Pictures
- Rubik, the Amazing Cube (1983) - Ruby-Spears Enterprises
- Sky Commanders (1987)
- Spiral Zone (1987)
- Strawberry Shortcake
  - Strawberry Shortcake (2003–2008)
  - Strawberry Shortcake's Berry Bitty Adventures (2010–2015)
  - Strawberry Shortcake: Berry in the Big City (2021–2024)
- Sylvanian Families
  - Sylvanian Families (1987)
  - Stories of the Sylvanian Families (1988)
- Street Sharks (1994–1997) - DIC Entertainment
- ThunderCats (1985–1989) - Telepictures Corporation
- Transformers - Hasbro
  - The Transformers (1984–1987)
  - Transformers: The Headmasters (1987–1988)
  - Transformers: Super-God Masterforce (1988–1989)
  - Transformers: Victory (1989)
  - Transformers: Zone (1990)
- Zoids – Tomy
  - Zoids: Chaotic Century (1999–2003)
  - Zoids: New Century (2001)
  - Zoids: Fuzors (2003)
  - Zoids: Genesis (2005–2006)
  - Zoids Wild (2019)
