= Vamos Brincar com a Turma da Mônica =

Brazilian animated television series based on the Monica and Friends comics

- Genre: Comedy; Preschool; Children's
- Created by: Mauricio de Sousa
- Based on: Monica and Friends by Mauricio de Sousa
- Written by: Ana Durães; Jordan Nugem; Leo Garcia; Renata Diniz; Belise Mofeoli
- Directed by: Mauricio de Sousa
- Creative directors: Marcos Saraiva; Marina Silva; Roger Keesse; Wagner Bonilla
- Voices of: Taís Feijó; Simone Evans; Pamella Rodrigues; Nany Assis; Ana Paula Schneider; Lipe Volpato
- Theme music composer: Ruben Feffer; Gustavo Kurlat
- Country of origin: Brazil
- Original language: Portuguese
- No. of seasons: 2
- No. of episodes: 52

Production
- Executive producer: Marcos Saraiva
- Producer: Daniele Germano
- Editor: Yasmin Borges
- Running time: 7 minutes
- Production companies: Mauricio de Sousa Produções; Gloobinho (co-production)

Original release
- Network: Globoplay (Note: It was originally released on the now-defunct Giga Gloob app on October 12, 2022 until it was discontinued in July 2023, the episodes were transferred and made available on the Globoplay streaming service.)
- Release: October 12, 2022 – December 19, 2024

Vamos Brincar com a Turma da Mônica (or Let's Play with Monica and Friends) is a Brazilian computer-animated television series created by Mauricio de Sousa and based on his Monica and Friends comic books. Produced by Mauricio de Sousa Produções, with animation studio Hype Animation and co-production with Gloobinho, originally debuted on the Giga Gloob app on October 12, 2022, with the end of the app, were released on Globoplay on July 11, 2023 and ended on December 19, 2024. With 52 episodes, it is a reimagining of the central characters from the Monica and Friends comic books in a preschool context.

On pay TV, the series has been shown on Gloobinho since October 12, 2023, and on the sister channel Gloob on January 6 and October 5, 2024.

== Synopsis ==
Monica, Jimmy Five, Milena, Maggy and Smudge are five very close friends, all four years old. They get together every day at Monica's house to play together while their parents work. Together, the children experience joy and conflict, filled with laughter, games and lots of music, proving that every good story needs a great beginning!

Between little adventures in the backyard, activities in the playroom and unexpected discoveries about how the world works, the beginning of the little gang's life is observed, narrated and commented on by Samson, Monica's pet stuffed rabbit. Not only can he talk, but he also talks to the audience and mediates debates on the topic of the day with three other children of the same age group: Jeremiah, Denise and Nick Nope. Each of them always brings a particular way of thinking about each subject.

== Production ==
Revealed to the public with a teaser released during the Comic Con Experience in São Paulo in 2017, Vamos Brincar is, in the words of Mauricio de Sousa, "a program aimed at very young children, aged two or three years old, and It shows, for example, Monica learning to walk and play alone and starting to form the personality of Monica from the comics that everyone already knows."

=== Release ===
In 52 episodes and 7 minutes, animated in 3D CGI by the Hype Animation studio, Monica, Jimmy Five, Smudge, Maggy and Milena are presented at the age of 4, in various games under the supervision of the rabbit Samson. Initially announced for release on the paid channels Gloob and Gloobinho in 2020, the first episodes of the production were made available on the Giga Gloob app on October 12, 2022.

On July 11, 2023, the first ten episodes of the first season were made available in the Globoplay catalog. The second part, with 16 episodes, was released on the platform on October 12, the same day the series debuted on the Gloobinho channel.

On July 23, 2024, the series was renewed for a second season, which would premiere on August 20, with 13 episodes. Divided into two parts of 13 episodes each, it was released on Globoplay on August 20 and December 19 of the same year.

== Voice cast ==
- Taís Feijó as Mônica
- Simone Evans as Magali
- Ana Paula Schneider as Cebolinha
- Nany Assis as Cascão
- Lipe Volpato as Sansão
- Pamella Rodrigues as Milena
- Victória Kuhl as Jeremias
- Lucila Bach as Denise
- Gabriela Yagui as Do Contra
- Marli Bortoletto as Dona Luisa

== Episodes ==
=== Series overview ===
Series overview
Season	Episodes		Originally released	
Season	Episodes		First released	Last released
1	26	10	October 12, 2022	October 22, 2022
1	26	16	October 12, 2023	
2	26	13	August 20, 2024	
2	26	13	December 19, 2024	

=== Season 1 ===
No. overall	No. in series	Brazilian Portuguese title	Original release date
1	1	"Caça ao Tesouro"	October 12, 2022 (Note: The first ten episodes were originally released on the now-defunct Giga Gloob app on October 12 to 22, 2022.)
2	2	"O Monstro do Escuro"	October 12, 2022
3	3	"De quem é esse Passarinho?"	October 12, 2022
4	4	"Maga Magali e a Menina Invisível"	October 12, 2022
5	5	"A Surpresa"	October 12, 2022
6	6	"Etebolinha"	October 12, 2022
7	7	"Dino Coleção"	October 12, 2022
8	8	"Brinquedão"	October 12, 2022
9	9	"As Magas das Cores"	October 12, 2022
10	10	"O Dono da História"	October 22, 2022
11	11	"Doidobol"	October 12, 2023
12	12	"O Tesouro e a Lua"	October 12, 2023
13	13	"O Pote de Ouro do Arco-Íris"	October 12, 2023
14	14	"A Coleção"	October 12, 2023
15	15	"Uma Grande Mentirinha"	October 12, 2023
16	16	"O Animal Incrível"	October 12, 2023
17	17	"Sr. Trevinho"	October 12, 2023
18	18	"O Mundo de Milena"	October 12, 2023
19	19	"Cebolão"	October 12, 2023
20	20	"Presente Especial"	October 12, 2023
21	21	"A Pipa... Pipocou"	October 12, 2023
22	22	"O Gigante"	October 12, 2023
23	23	"O Engraçadinho"	October 12, 2023
24	24	"Os Três Desejos de Cascão"	October 12, 2023
25	25	"Cebolinha e o Robô"	October 12, 2023
26	26	"Cascão não gosta de Brócolis?"	October 12, 2023

=== Season 2 ===
No. overall	No. in series	Brazilian Portuguese title	Original release date
27	1	"Bolabolê"	August 20, 2024
28	2	"A Dança do Polvo"	August 20, 2024
29	3	"Quem Quer Ser Um Campeão?"	August 20, 2024
30	4	"Quebrou!"	August 20, 2024
31	5	"O Melhor Brinquedo"	August 20, 2024
32	6	"Piscina de Dinossauro"	August 20, 2024
33	7	"Tchau, Solução"	August 20, 2024
34	8	"A Invasora"	August 20, 2024
35	9	"Nossa Praia"	August 20, 2024
36	10	"Motoristas Atrapalhados"	August 20, 2024
37	11	"Dia de Calor"	August 20, 2024
38	12	"Fadas de Sabão"	August 20, 2024
39	13	"Olha o Passarinho!"	August 20, 2024
40	14	"Quem Procura, Acha!"	December 19, 2024
41	15	"Milena Dorminhoca"	December 19, 2024
42	16	"Padaria da Mônica e da Magali"	December 19, 2024
43	17	"É Hora de Acampar!"	December 19, 2024
44	18	"Atchim!"	December 19, 2024
45	19	"Bracinho Enfaixado"	December 19, 2024
46	20	"Como é que a Banda Toca?"	December 19, 2024
47	21	"A Imitadora"	December 19, 2024
48	22	"Rolezinho da Arrumação"	December 19, 2024
49	23	"Arraiar da Turminha"	December 19, 2024
50	24	"O Pãozinho"	December 19, 2024
51	25	"Uma Coisa Especial"	December 19, 2024
52	26	"Dia Perfeito"	December 19, 2024
