= List of Captain Tsubasa episodes =

The following is an episode list for the anime television series Captain Tsubasa. Of the five series:

1. 1983 TV series had 128 episodes and 4 films (Europe Daikessen & Ayaushi, Zen Nippon Jr., in '85; Asu ni Mukatte Hashire & Sekai Daikessen Jr. World Cup in '86)
2. 1989 OVA series (Shin) had 13 episodes and 1 other OVA (Holland Youth)
3. 1994 TV series (J) had 47 episodes
4. 2001 TV series (road to 2002) had 52 episodes
5. 2018 TV series had 52 episodes
6. 2023 TV series had 39 episodes

In total there have been 4 films, 14 OVAs and 279 TV episodes.

== Captain Tsubasa ==
=== Season 1: 1983-84 (1-26) ===
No. overall	No. in season	Title	Original release date
1	1	"The New Soccer Star"; Transliteration: "Ōzora e habatake" (Japanese: 大空へはばたけ)	October 13, 1983
2	2	"A Career Begins"; Transliteration: "Moero sakkā kozō" (Japanese: 燃えろサッカー小僧)	October 20, 1983
3	3	"Kick-Off for the Future"; Transliteration: "Ashita e mukatte kikkuofu" (Japanese: 明日に向って、キック・オフ)	October 27, 1983
4	4	"The Football Is My Best Friend"; Transliteration: "Bōru wa tomodachi" (Japanese: ボールは友だち)	November 3, 1983
5	5	"Where Is the Rival?"; Transliteration: "Raibaru wa doko da" (Japanese: ライバルはどこだ)	November 10, 1983
6	6	"Blocked Off"; Transliteration: "Gōru o katamero" (Japanese: ゴールをかためろ)	November 17, 1983
7	7	"The Show Must Go On"; Transliteration: "unmei no rongu shuuto" (Japanese: 運命のロングシュート)	November 24, 1983
8	8	"A Perfect Duo"; Transliteration: "sawayaka konbi tanjou" (Japanese: さわやかコンビ誕生)	December 1, 1983
9	9	"The Last Chance"; Transliteration: "rasuto chansu nikakero" (Japanese: ラストチャンスにかけろ)	December 8, 1983
10	10	"A Long Way to Brazil"; Transliteration: "yume ha burajiru he" (Japanese: 夢はブラジルへ)	December 15, 1983
11	11	"The Provocation"; Transliteration: "hagure ookami kojirou arawaru" (Japanese: はぐれ狼小次郎あらわる)	December 22, 1983
12	12	"No Easy Way"; Transliteration: "mezase ! nippon'ichi" (Japanese: めざせ! 日本一)	December 29, 1983
13	13	"Fast Game in the Mud"; Transliteration: "nazuma mireno nessen" (Japanese: 泥まみれの熱戦)	January 5, 1984
14	14	"Tsubasa Is Sieged"; Transliteration: "fiirudo no kikoushi" (Japanese: フィールドの貴公子)	January 12, 1984
15	15	"An Unfair Enemy"; Transliteration: "kizu darakeno kiipaa" (Japanese: 傷だらけのキーパー)	January 19, 1984
16	16	"The Verification Test"; Transliteration: "yume hahitotsu moe ro irebun" (Japanese: 夢はひとつ燃えろイレブン)	January 26, 1984
17	17	"The Youth National Championship"; Transliteration: "kaimaku ! zenkokutaikai" (Japanese: 開幕! 全国大会)	February 2, 1984
18	18	"Fatal Confrontation"; Transliteration: "shukumei no taiketsu ! tsubasa VS kojirou" (Japanese: 宿命の対決! 翼VS小次郎)	February 9, 1984
19	19	"The Mighty Shot"; Transliteration: "kyoufu no dangan shuuto" (Japanese: 恐怖の弾丸シュート)	February 16, 1984
20	20	"Soccer Is My Dream"; Transliteration: "naku na ! tsubasa" (Japanese: サッカーは俺の夢だ！)	February 23, 1984
21	21	"No Victory in Semi Final"; Transliteration: "naku na ! tsubasa" (Japanese: 泣くな! 翼)	March 1, 1984
22	22	"The Brothers Tachibana"; Transliteration: "futago no sutoraikaa" (Japanese: 双子のストライカー)	March 8, 1984
23	23	"Ryo Shoots an Own Goal"; Transliteration: "ishizaki no dai chonbo" (Japanese: 石崎の大チョンボ)	March 15, 1984
24	24	"The Fight for the Final"; Transliteration: "kuuchuu dai kessen" (Japanese: 空中大決戦)	March 22, 1984
25	25	"The Best Keeper of the Tournament"; Transliteration: "ore ga taikai ichi no kiipaa da !" (Japanese: 俺が大会一のキーパーだ!)	March 28, 1984
26	26	"The End of a Career"; Transliteration: "garasu no eusu" (Japanese: ガラスのエース)	April 5, 1984

=== Season 2: 1984 (1-26) ===
No. overall	No. in season	Title	Original release date
27	1	"Encounters in Semi-Final"; Transliteration: "besuto 4 ! gekitotsu" (Japanese: ベスト4！激突)	April 12, 1984
28	2	"The Brave Fighters from the North"; Transliteration: "kitaguni no atsuki irebun" (Japanese: 北国の熱きイレブン)	April 19, 1984
29	3	"Hard Confrontations"; Transliteration: "chi midorono taiketsu" (Japanese: 血みどろの対決)	April 26, 1984
30	4	"A Wounded Prince"; Transliteration: "kizu darakeno kikoushi" (Japanese: 傷だらけの貴公子)	May 3, 1984
31	5	"A Brilliant Fight"; Transliteration: "karei naru taiketsu" (Japanese: 華麗なる対決)	May 10, 1984
32	6	"Tsubasa in the Trap"; Transliteration: "tsubasa wo wana nikakero" (Japanese: 翼をワナにかけろ)	May 17, 1984
33	7	"I Can't Play"; Transliteration: "tobenai tsubasa" (Japanese: とべない翼)	May 24, 1984
34	8	"Tsubasa's Resurrection"; Transliteration: "yomigaere tsubasa" (Japanese: よみがえれ翼)	May 31, 1984
35	9	"Misogi, Don't Die"; Transliteration: "atsushi shina naide" (Japanese: 淳死なないで)	June 7, 1984
36	10	"My Heart Still Beats"; Transliteration: "boku no shinzou mada ugoi teiru" (Japanese: ボクの心臓まだ動いている)	June 14, 1984
37	11	"Mega-Shot"; Transliteration: "kiseki no chou rongu shuuto" (Japanese: 奇跡の超ロングシュート)	June 21, 1984
38	12	"A Wise Decision"; Transliteration: "nemure ru mouko . kojirou" (Japanese: 眠れる猛虎・小次郎)	June 28, 1984
39	13	"The Finale"; Transliteration: "fukkatsu ! tensai kiipaa wakabayashi" (Japanese: 復活！天才キーパー若林)	July 5, 1984
40	14	"The Shoting Secret"; Transliteration: "deta ! sensei no tsuin shuuto" (Japanese: 出た！先制のツインシュート)	July 12, 1984
41	15	"The Duel"; Transliteration: "gekitotsu ! wakabayashi tsui kojirou" (Japanese: 激突！若林対小次郎)	July 19, 1984
42	16	"Roar, Lion"; Transliteration: "mouko yo kiba womuke !" (Japanese: 猛虎よ牙をむけ！)	July 26, 1984
43	17	"Nankatsu in Crisis"; Transliteration: "abunau shi ! gouruden konbi" (Japanese: 危うし！ゴールデンコンビ)	August 2, 1984
44	18	"The Equalizer"; Transliteration: "honoo no daibinguheddo" (Japanese: 炎のダイビングヘッド)	August 9, 1984
45	19	"The Game Without Aces"; Transliteration: "pinchi ! eusu naki tatakai" (Japanese: ピンチ！エースなき戦い)	August 16, 1984
46	20	"Against Better Knowledge"; Transliteration: "yatta ! ishizaki tokui no ganmen burokku" (Japanese: やった！石崎得意の顔面ブロック)	August 23, 1984
47	21	"Kojiro's Sign of Winning"; Transliteration: "kojirou no V sain" (Japanese: 小次郎のVサイン)	August 30, 1984
48	22	"Unsuccessful Overhead Kick"; Transliteration: "kiseki wo yobu toripuru shuuto" (Japanese: 奇跡を呼ぶトリプルシュート)	September 6, 1984
49	23	"The Fight Continues"; Transliteration: "shakunetsu no enchousen" (Japanese: 灼熱の延長戦)	September 13, 1984
50	24	"The Extra Time"; Transliteration: "aa maboroshi no gouru !?" (Japanese: ああ幻のゴール!?)	September 20, 1984
51	25	"What's the Result of the Extra Time"; Transliteration: "ore tachiha make nai !" (Japanese: オレたちは負けない！)	September 27, 1984
52	26	"One New Strategy"; Transliteration: "shitou ! saienchou sen" (Japanese: 死闘！再延長戦)	October 4, 1984

=== Season 3: 1984-85 (1-26) ===
No. overall	No. in season	Title	Original release date
53	1	"Two Are Better Than One"; Transliteration: "fukkatsu ! gouruden konbi" (Japanese: 復活！ゴールデンコンビ)	October 11, 1984
54	2	"The Duel of the Strikers"; Transliteration: "saigo no kessen ! tsubasa tai kojirou" (Japanese: 最後の決戦!翼対小次郎)	October 18, 1984
55	3	"Tears Despite Success"; Transliteration: "eikou soshite sayonara" (Japanese: 栄光そしてサヨナラ)	October 25, 1984
56	4	"Great Departures"; Transliteration: "sorezoreno tabidachi" (Japanese: それぞれの旅立ち)	November 1, 1984
57	5	"The New Rival"; Transliteration: "ore tachi chuugaku sannensei" (Japanese: オレたち中学三年生)	November 8, 1984
58	6	"The Shooting of the Hawk"; Transliteration: "V3 heno atsuki sutaato" (Japanese: V3への熱きスタート)	November 15, 1984
59	7	"Nankatsu vs. Otomo"; Transliteration: "arata naru raibaru" (Japanese: 新たなるライバル)	November 22, 1984
60	8	"Tsubasa vs. Nitta"; Transliteration: "tsubasa yo ! fiIrudo no taka ninare" (Japanese: 翼よ！フィールドの鷹になれ)	November 29, 1984
61	9	"A Hard Comparison"; Transliteration: "no^torappu hayabusa shuUto" (Japanese: ノートラップ隼シュート)	December 6, 1984
62	10	"The Challenge"; Transliteration: "chousensha tachino rarabai" (Japanese: 挑戦者たちのララバイ)	December 13, 1984
63	11	"Decisions"; Transliteration: "datou . tsubasa ! ore ga hiIrou da" (Japanese: 打倒・翼！オレがヒーローだ)	December 20, 1984
64	12	"Race Against Time"; Transliteration: "gou, te, so.i.shi.ke.wosaaso?u(maru)" (Japanese: 甦ったエース・三杉淳)	December 27, 1984
65	13	"The Journey to Europe"; Transliteration: "yume no taiketsu ! san sugi tsui kojirou" (Japanese: 夢の対決！三杉対小次郎)	January 3, 1985
66	14	"The Duel"; Transliteration: "youroppa hatsu tsubasa kunhe" (Japanese: ヨーロッパ発翼くんへ)	January 10, 1985
67	15	"A King Resigns"; Transliteration: "fiirudo ni chitta kikoushi" (Japanese: フィールドに散った貴公子)	January 17, 1985
68	16	"The Letter"; Transliteration: "wakabayashi karano tegami" (Japanese: 若林からの手紙)	January 24, 1985
69	17	"The National Championship"; Transliteration: "kiba wotogu mouko . kojirou" (Japanese: 牙をとぐ猛虎・小次郎)	January 31, 1985
70	18	"A Strong Enemy"; Transliteration: "mezase V3 ! haran no kaimaku" (Japanese: めざせV3！波乱の開幕)	February 7, 1985
71	19	"The Shot from a Distance"; Transliteration: "kime ro ! doraibu shuuto" (Japanese: 決めろ！ドライブシュート)	February 14, 1985
72	20	"The Secret Goal"; Transliteration: "fusege ! hissatsu no kamisori shuuto" (Japanese: 防げ！必殺のカミソリシュート)	February 21, 1985
73	21	"A Rival Does Not Give Up"; Transliteration: "raibaru tachino atsuki ashioto" (Japanese: ライバルたちの熱き足音)	February 28, 1985
74	22	"Air Acrobats"; Transliteration: "deta ! sukairabu . harikeun" (Japanese: 出た！スカイラブ・ハリケーン)	March 7, 1985
75	23	"The Catapult Shot"; Transliteration: "tsubasa yo dare yorimo takaku tobe" (Japanese: 翼よ誰よりも高く飛べ)	March 14, 1985
76	24	"The Acrobats"; Transliteration: "tachibana kyoudai . hissatsu no konbipureu" (Japanese: 立花兄弟・必殺のコンビプレー)	March 21, 1985
77	25	"A New Trick"; Transliteration: "kime ro ! suraideingu shuuto" (Japanese: 決めろ！スライディングシュート)	March 28, 1985
78	26	"The Quarter Final"; Transliteration: "gekitotsu ! besuto 8" (Japanese: 激突！ベスト8)	April 4, 1985

=== Season 4: 1985 (1-26) ===
No. overall	No. in season	Title	Original release date
79	1	"An Uneventful Match"; Transliteration: "kita no kou washi . matsuyama hikari" (Japanese: 北の荒鷲・松山光)	April 11, 1985
80	2	"Tsugito's Trick Box"; Transliteration: "beuru wonuida kai warabe tsugi fuji hiroshi" (Japanese: ベールをぬいだ怪童次藤洋)	April 18, 1985
81	3	"A Falcon with Lame Wings"; Transliteration: "hane womogareta fi^rudo no taka" (Japanese: 羽をもがれたフィールドの鷹)	April 25, 1985
82	4	"A Special Shot"; Transliteration: "kihaku no renzoku doraibu shuuto" (Japanese: 気迫の連続ドライブシュート)	May 2, 1985
83	5	"The Fight Continues"; Transliteration: "gekitotsu ! gouru mae no shitou" (Japanese: 激突！ゴール前の死闘)	May 9, 1985
84	6	"Teamwork"; Transliteration: "fumetsu no chiimuwaaku" (Japanese: 不滅のチームワーク)	May 16, 1985
85	7	"Match Preparations"; Transliteration: "moe agare ! besuto 4" (Japanese: 燃えあがれ！ベスト4)	May 23, 1985
86	8	"Help Cry to the Substitutes' Bench"; Transliteration: "wakashimadu . munen no hatsu shitten" (Japanese: 若島津・無念の初失点)	May 30, 1985
87	9	"The Present for the Captain"; Transliteration: "ori no nakano mouko . kojirou" (Japanese: オリの中の猛虎・小次郎)	June 6, 1985
88	10	"Top Performance"; Transliteration: "ikari no taigaa gundan !!" (Japanese: 怒りのタイガー軍団!!)	June 13, 1985
89	11	"The Letter from Europe"; Transliteration: "misaki tarou no youroppa tayori" (Japanese: 岬太郎のヨーロッパ便り)	June 20, 1985
90	12	"Who Will Be Chosen"; Transliteration: "yume no youroppa ensei . eraba rerunoha dareka !?" (Japanese: 夢のヨーロッパ遠征・選ばれるのは誰か!?)	June 27, 1985
91	13	"Where Love Falls"; Transliteration: "fiirudo ni tobe ! washi to taka" (Japanese: フィールドに翔べ！鷲と鷹)	July 4, 1985
92	14	"The Attack Headlong"; Transliteration: "kita no kou washi . muteki no rongu shuuto" (Japanese: 北の荒鷲・無敵のロングシュート)	July 11, 1985
93	15	"Fairness Goes First"; Transliteration: "shouri heno gyakushuu" (Japanese: 勝利への逆襲)	July 18, 1985
94	16	"The Attack"; Transliteration: "moukou ! shi renzoku shuuto" (Japanese: 猛攻！四連続シュート)	July 25, 1985
95	17	"A Captain as Hero"; Transliteration: "kizu darakeno tsubasa yomigaere fushichou" (Japanese: 傷だらけの翼よみがえれ不死鳥)	August 1, 1985
96	18	"Bitter Tears"; Transliteration: "saraba kita no senshi" (Japanese: さらば北の戦士)	August 8, 1985
97	19	"Hyuga's Challenge"; Transliteration: "mouko no chousenjou" (Japanese: 猛虎の挑戦状)	August 15, 1985
98	20	"Feverish Ravings"; Transliteration: "youroppa no atsuki chikai wo omoidase" (Japanese: ヨーロッパの熱き誓いを思い出せ)	August 22, 1985
99	21	"Matchwinner Tsubasa"; Transliteration: "tsubasa tsui ingurando juu sensha gundan" (Japanese: 翼対イングランド重戦車軍団)	August 29, 1985
100	22	"Surprise in Field"; Transliteration: "aratanaru shiren" (Japanese: あらたなる試練)	September 5, 1985
101	23	"Tsubasa vs. Pierre, a Fair Fight"; Transliteration: "moe ru fi^rudo tsubasa tsui pieuru !!" (Japanese: 燃えるフィールド翼対ピエール!!)	September 12, 1985
102	24	"The Might of the Kaiser"; Transliteration: "taose ! yo^roppa . nanbaa wan" (Japanese: 倒せ！ヨーロッパ・ナンバーワン)	September 19, 1985
103	25	"Unexpected Visit"; Transliteration: "muteki no koutei . shunaidaa" (Japanese: 無敵の皇帝・シュナイダー)	September 26, 1985
104	26	"An Impossible Recovery"; Transliteration: "eikou heno rasutokikku" (Japanese: 栄光へのラストキック)	October 3, 1985

=== Season 5: 1985-86 (1-24) ===
No. overall	No. in season	Title	Original release date
105	1	"The Last Fight Begins"; Transliteration: "shukumei no taiketsu, futatabi" (Japanese: 宿命の対決、ふたたび)	October 10, 1985
106	2	"The Great Final"; Transliteration: "seiki no rasuto . faito" (Japanese: 世紀のラスト・ファイト)	October 17, 1985
107	3	"Nankatsu Is Down"; Transliteration: "sensei no suupaa shotto !" (Japanese: 先制のスーパーショット！)	October 24, 1985
108	4	"Don't Give Up"; Transliteration: "gyakushuu no doraibu shuuto" (Japanese: 逆襲のドライブシュート)	October 31, 1985
109	5	"The Tiger Fights Alone"; Transliteration: "hi wofuku taigaa shoto" (Japanese: 火をふくタイガーショト)	November 7, 1985
110	6	"A Despair Fight"; Transliteration: "ouja . minami kuzu saidai no kiki" (Japanese: 王者・南葛最大の危機)	November 14, 1985
111	7	"Tsubasa Doesn't Give Up"; Transliteration: "kiseki no doraibu shuuto" (Japanese: 奇跡のドライブシュート)	November 21, 1985
112	8	"Tsubasa Is Hurt"; Transliteration: "hyuuga kojirou no hangeki !" (Japanese: 日向小次郎の反撃！)	November 28, 1985
113	9	"Thrill"; Transliteration: "mai aga re ! fushichou" (Japanese: 舞い上がれ！不死鳥)	December 5, 1985
114	10	"Keep on Fighting"; Transliteration: "moe ro ! honoo no chiimuwaaku" (Japanese: 燃えろ！炎のチームワーク)	December 12, 1985
115	11	"Dream Goal"; Transliteration: "yume no daibingu . oubaaheddo" (Japanese: 夢のダイビング・オーバーヘッド)	December 19, 1985
116	12	"On Knife's Edge"; Transliteration: "rasutogouru ha ore ga toru !" (Japanese: ラストゴールは俺が取る！)	December 26, 1985
117	13	"With All Power"; Transliteration: "mamori nuke ! ore tachino gouru" (Japanese: 守り抜け！俺たちのゴール)	January 9, 1986
118	14	"It's Getting Exciting"; Transliteration: "hashire tsubasa ! shouri no gouru e" (Japanese: 走れ翼！勝利のゴールへ)	January 16, 1986
119	15	"The Unsuccessful Tiger Shot"; Transliteration: "unmei no taimu . appu" (Japanese: 運命のタイム・アップ)	January 23, 1986
120	16	"Still Tied"; Transliteration: "kake nukero ! V3 ha ore tachino yume" (Japanese: 駆けぬけろ！V3はオレたちの夢)	January 30, 1986
121	17	"To the Last Gasp"; Transliteration: "kiseki woyobu fiirudo no taka" (Japanese: 奇跡をよぶフィールドの鷹)	February 6, 1986
122	18	"Just 10 Minutes Left"; Transliteration: "fukkatsu ore tachino kyaputen" (Japanese: 復活オレたちのキャプテン)	February 13, 1986
123	19	"All or Nothing"; Transliteration: "tsubasa no saishuu sakusen !!" (Japanese: 翼の最終作戦!!)	February 20, 1986
124	20	"In Last Minute"; Transliteration: "kizu darakeno hiirou" (Japanese: 傷だらけのヒーロー)	February 27, 1986
125	21	"Shared Victory"; Transliteration: "eikou soshite aratana ru tabidachi" (Japanese: 栄光そして新なる旅立ち)	March 6, 1986
126	22	"Memories"; Transliteration: "saikou no tomo ore to wakabayashi gen san" (Japanese: 最高の友俺と若林源三)	March 13, 1986
127	23	"Hoping for Europe"; Transliteration: "eien no paatonaa ore to misaki tarou" (Japanese: 永遠のパートナー俺と岬太郎)	March 20, 1986
128	24	"The 17 Best"; Transliteration: "habatake ! kagayake ru senshi tachi" (Japanese: はばたけ！輝ける戦士たち)	March 27, 1986

=== Anime films ===
No.	Title	Original release date
1	"Captain Tsubasa: The Great European Showdown"; Transliteration: "Captain Tsubasa: Europe Daikessen" (Japanese: キャプテン翼 ヨーロッパ大決戦)	13 July 1985
2	"Captain Tsubasa: Danger! All Japan Jr."; Transliteration: "Captain Tsubasa: Ayaushi, Zen Nippon Jr." (Japanese: キャプテン翼 危うし! 全日本Jr.)	21 December 1985
3	"Captain Tsubasa: Run Towards Tomorrow!"; Transliteration: "Captain Tsubasa: Asu ni Mukatte Hashire!" (Japanese: キャプテン翼 明日に向って走れ!)	15 March 1986
4	"Captain Tsubasa: World Great Battle! Jr. World Cup"; Transliteration: "Captain Tsubasa: Sekai Daikessen!! Jr. World Cup" (Japanese: キャプテン翼 世界大決戦!! Jr.ワールドカップ)	12 July 1986

== Shin Captain Tsubasa ==
No.	Title	Original release date
1	"Take Flight, Tsubasa! Challenge the World"; Transliteration: "Tsubasa yo Habatake! Sekai e no Chōsen" (Japanese: 翼よはばたけ! 世界への挑戦)	July 1, 1989
2	"Defeated! Start from Scratch"; Transliteration: "Haiboku! Zero kara no Shuppatsu" (Japanese: 敗北! ゼロからの再出発)	August 2, 1989
3	"Rebirth! Golden Duo"; Transliteration: "Fukkatsu! Goruden Konbi" (Japanese: 復活! ゴールデン・コンビ)	September 1, 1989
4	"Gathering! Rivals All Over the World"; Transliteration: "Shūketsu! Sekai no Raibaru-tachi" (Japanese: 集結! 世界のライバルたち)	October 8, 1989
5	"Confrontation! Defeat Hernandez"; Transliteration: "Taiketsu! Herunandesu wo Taose" (Japanese: 対決! ヘルナンデスを倒せ)	November 1, 1989
6	"Blast Off! J-Boys Soccer!"; Transliteration: "Hasshin! J-Boys Sakka" (Japanese: 発進! J-BOYSサッカー)	December 1, 1989
7	"White Hot! The Genius Diaz vs. Japan"; Transliteration: "Hakunetsu! Tensai Diasu tai Zen Nihon" (Japanese: 白熱! 天才ディアス対全日本)	December 21, 1989
8	"Battle! Clash of the Four Best"; Transliteration: "Taisen! Besuto 4 no Gekitotsu" (Japanese: 決戦! ベスト4の激突)	February 1, 1990
9	"Counterattack! Break the Hometown Decision"; Transliteration: "Hangeki! Homutaun Dishijon wo Yabure" (Japanese: 反撃! ホームタウンディシジョンを破れ)	March 1, 1990
10	"Hard Fight! Bloody Ultimate Defense"; Transliteration: "Gekitō! Chimamire no Shishu" (Japanese: 激闘! 血まみれの死守)	April 8, 1990
11	"Decisive Victory! Challenge the Steel Giant"; Transliteration: "Kesshō! Kōtetsu no Kyōjin ni Idome" (Japanese: 決勝! 鋼鉄の巨人に挑め)	May 1, 1990
12	"Pursuit! Has the Number One in the World Seen This?"; Transliteration: "Tsuigeki! Sekaiichi ga Mieta?" (Japanese: 追撃! 世界一が見えた?)	June 1, 1990
13	"Soar, Tsubasa! The Oath to the Great Skies"; Transliteration: "Tsubasa yo Kake! Ozora e no Chikai" (Japanese: 翼よ翔け! 大空への誓い)	July 1, 1990
OVA	"Captain Tsubasa: The Most Powerful Opponent! Holland Youth"; Transliteration: "Captain Tsubasa: Saikyo no Teki! Holanda Youth" (Japanese: キャプテン翼 最強の敵! オランダユース)	November 6, 1994

== Captain Tsubasa J (aka) World Youth ==
No.	Title	Original release date
1	"The Great Dream Carried on the Wings"; Transliteration: "Dekkai Yume wo Tsubasa ni Nosete" (Japanese: でっかい夢を翼にのせて)	October 21, 1994
2	"Challenge from the Genius Goalkeeper Wakabayashi"; Transliteration: "Tensai GK Wakabayashi Kara no Chousen" (Japanese: 天才GK若林からの挑戦)	October 28, 1994
3	"A Refreshing Meeting with Taro Misaki"; Transliteration: "Sawayaka Deai Misaki Tarou" (Japanese: さわやか出会い岬太郎)	November 4, 1994
4	"The Burning, Long Battle Starts Now"; Transliteration: "Atsuki Nagaki Tatakai ga Ima Hajimaru" (Japanese: 熱き永き戦いが今始まる)	November 11, 1994
5	"Jump Up! Overhead Kick"; Transliteration: "Tobe! Oubaaheddo" (Japanese: とべ!オーバーヘッド)	November 18, 1994
6	"Tsubasa and Misaki's Golden Duo"; Transliteration: "Tsubasa - Misaki Goruden Konbi" (Japanese: 翼・岬ゴールデンコンビ)	November 25, 1994
7	"A Scorching Battle of Offense and Defense"; Transliteration: "Hakunetsu no Koubousen" (Japanese: 白熱の攻防戦)	December 2, 1994
8	"I Am Kojiro Hyuga"; Transliteration: "Ore ga Hyuuga Kojirou" (Japanese: 俺が日向小次郎)	December 9, 1994
9	"The Hat-Trick of the Raging Waves"; Transliteration: "Dotou no Hattotorikku" (Japanese: 怒濤のハットトリック)	December 23, 1994
10	"Tough Battle! Rain-Soaked Pitch"; Transliteration: "Gekisen! Ame no fiirudo" (Japanese: 激戦!雨のフィールド)	January 13, 1995
11	"Danger! Time's Up"; Transliteration: "Abunaushi! Taimuappu" (Japanese: 危うし!タイムアップ)	January 20, 1995
12	"Bring Down the Keeper Wakabayashi!"; Transliteration: "Kiipaa Wakabayashi o Tsubuse!" (Japanese: キーパー若林をつぶせ!)	January 27, 1995
13	"Wonderful Rivals"; Transliteration: "Subarashiki Raibaru-tachi" (Japanese: すばらしきライバルたち)	February 3, 1995
14	"Preemptive Volley!!"; Transliteration: "Sensei no Boreeshuuto!!" (Japanese: 先制のボレーシュート!!)	February 10, 1995
15	"I'm Not Afraid, Because the Ball Is My Friend"; Transliteration: "Booru wa Tomodachi Kowakunai" (Japanese: ボールは友だち怖くない)	February 17, 1995
16	"Deadly Battle! Tsubasa vs. Kojiro Hyuga"; Transliteration: "Shitou! Tsubasa VS Hyuuga Kojirou" (Japanese: 死闘!翼VS日向小次郎)	February 24, 1995
17	"The Young Noble, Jun Misugi"; Transliteration: "Kikoushi. Misugi Jun" (Japanese: 貴公子・三杉淳)	March 3, 1995
18	"The Terrifying Aerial Acrobats"; Transliteration: "Kyoufu no Kuuchuu Akurobatto" (Japanese: 恐怖の空中アクロバット)	March 10, 1995
19	"A Warm Friendship from a Northern Land"; Transliteration: "Kita no Kuni kara Atsuki Yuujou" (Japanese: 北の国から熱き友情)	March 17, 1995
20	"The Little Eleven from the North"; Transliteration: "Kitaguni no Chiisana Irebun" (Japanese: 北国の小さなイレブン)	April 28, 1995
21	"Appearance! Keeper Ken Wakashimazu"; Transliteration: "Toujou! Kiipaa Wakashimazu Ken" (Japanese: 登場!キーパー若島津健)	May 5, 1995
22	"Tsubasa vs. the Glass Prince"; Transliteration: "Tsubasa VS Garasu no Kikoushi" (Japanese: 翼VSガラスの貴公子)	May 19, 1995
23	"A Splendid Match!"; Transliteration: "Kareinaru Tatakai!" (Japanese: 華麗なる闘い!)	June 2, 1995
24	"The Silent Ace"; Transliteration: "Chinmoku no Eesu" (Japanese: 沈黙のエース)	June 9, 1995
25	"Tsubasa, the Phoenix"; Transliteration: "fushichou. tsubasa" (Japanese: 不死鳥・翼)	June 16, 1995
26	"Stand Up! Wounded Hero"; Transliteration: "Tate! Kizudarake no Hiiroo" (Japanese: 立て!傷だらけのヒーロー)	June 30, 1995
27	"The Night Before the Great Game"; Transliteration: "Daikessen sono Zenya" (Japanese: 大決戦その前夜)	July 7, 1995
28	"Wakashimazu vs. the Twin Shot"; Transliteration: "Wakashimazu VS Tsuin Shuuto" (Japanese: 若島津VSツインシュート)	July 21, 1995
29	"The Raging Tiger's Flaming Bullet Shot"; Transliteration: "Mouko. Honoo no Dangan Shuuto" (Japanese: 猛虎・炎の弾丸シュート)	July 28, 1995
30	"The Wounded Eleven"; Transliteration: "Kizudarake no Irebun" (Japanese: 傷だらけのイレブン)	August 4, 1995
31	"The Raging Tiger's Counterattack"; Transliteration: "Mouko no Gyakushuu" (Japanese: 猛虎の逆襲)	August 11, 1995
32	"Deadly Fight! Burning Extra Time Again"; Transliteration: "Shitou! Shakunetsu no Saienchousen" (Japanese: 死闘!灼熱の再延長戦)	August 18, 1995
33	"Send Your Dreams Into the Goal!"; Transliteration: "Gouru ni Yume wo Tatakikome!" (Japanese: ゴールに夢をたたきこめ!)	August 25, 1995
34	"Tsubasa's Dream, the World Cup"; Transliteration: "Tsubasa no Yume. Waarudo Kappu" (Japanese: 翼の夢・ワールドカップ)	September 1, 1995
35	"Shingo Aoi Appears! Promise in a Coin"; Transliteration: "Aoi Shingo Toujou! Chikai no Koin" (Japanese: 葵新伍登場!誓いのコイン)	September 8, 1995
36	"Shingo's Brilliant Debut"; Transliteration: "Shingo. Sen'yaka Debyuu" (Japanese: 新伍・鮮やかデビュー)	September 22, 1995
37	"Lonely Special Training"; Transliteration: "Kodoku no Tokkun" (Japanese: 孤独の特訓)	September 29, 1995
38	"Standing on the Pitch of Glory"; Transliteration: "Eikou no Fiirudo ni Tatsu" (Japanese: 栄光のフィールドに立つ)	October 13, 1995
39	"The Mysterious Real Japan 7"; Transliteration: "Nazo no Riaru Japan 7" (Japanese: 謎のリアルジャパン7)	October 20, 1995
40	"The Great Struggle of the Japanese Young Team!!"; Transliteration: "Zen Nihon Yuusu Daikusen!!" (Japanese: 全日本ユース大苦戦!!)	October 27, 1995
41	"Martial Arts Duel! Thailand Youth"; Transliteration: "Kakutougi sen! Tai Yuusu" (Japanese: 格闘技戦!タイユース)	November 10, 1995
42	"A New Golden Duo Is Born!"; Transliteration: "Shin Goruden Konbi Tanjou!" (Japanese: 新ゴールデンコンビ誕生!)	November 17, 1995
43	"Great Reversal! Break Through the First Qualifiers!!"; Transliteration: "Dai Gyakuten! Ichiji Yosen Toppa!!" (Japanese: 大逆転!一次予選突破!!)	November 24, 1995
44	"Return of the Seven Fighters"; Transliteration: "Kaettekita Shichinin no Senshi" (Japanese: 帰って来た七人の戦士)	December 1, 1995
45	"Killer! Raiju Shot"; Transliteration: "Hissatsu! Raijuu Shuuto" (Japanese: 必殺!雷獣シュート)	December 8, 1995
46	"The Strongest, Reborn Japan Youth"; Transliteration: "Saikyou no Shinsei Zen Nihon Yuusu" (Japanese: 最強の新生全日本ユース)	December 15, 1995
47	"Aim for 2002!"; Transliteration: "Mezase! 2002-nen" (Japanese: めざせ!2002年)	December 22, 1995

== Captain Tsubasa: Road to 2002 ==
No.	Title	Original release date
1	"Road to Dream"; Transliteration: "Roodo to Dorimu" (Japanese: ロードトゥドリーム)	October 7, 2001
2	"Tsubasa meets Roberto"; Transliteration: "Roberuto to no deai" (Japanese: ロベルトとの出会い)	October 14, 2001
3	"Taro Misaki is Back"; Transliteration: "Kaettekita Misaki Taro" (Japanese: 帰ってきた岬太郎)	October 21, 2001
4	"Blazing Kojiro"; Transliteration: "Hono-o-no Kojiro" (Japanese: 炎の小次郎)	October 28, 2001
5	"Captain Tsubasa is Born"; Transliteration: "Tanjou! Kyaputen Tsubasa!" (Japanese: 誕生! キャプテン翼)	November 4, 2001
6	"The Boy's National Soccer Championship Opens!"; Transliteration: "Kaimaku! Zen Nippon sho sakka takai" (Japanese: 開幕! 全日本少年サッカー大会)	November 11, 2001
7	"Ace of Glass"; Transliteration: "Gurasu no Eesu" (Japanese: ガラスのエース)	November 18, 2001
8	"Arise, Jun Misugi!"; Transliteration: "Tachiagare! Misugi Jun" (Japanese: 立ち上がれ! 三杉淳)	November 25, 2001
9	"Crash! Tsubasa vs. Hyuga"; Transliteration: "Gekitotsu! Tsubasa tai Hyuga" (Japanese: 激突! 翼VS日向)	December 2, 2001
10	"Sizzling Final Match"; Transliteration: "Shakunetsu no Keshousen" (Japanese: 灼熱の決勝戦!)	December 9, 2001
11	"Goodbye, Roberto"; Transliteration: "Sayonara, Roberuto" (Japanese: サヨナラロベルト)	December 16, 2001
12	"Kickoff for Tomorrow"; Transliteration: "Asu e no Kickoff" (Japanese: 明日へのキックオフ)	December 23, 2001
13	"Fierce Tiger Shot!"; Transliteration: "Arashi no Taiga Shuuto!" (Japanese: 嵐のタイガーショット)	December 30, 2001
14	"Challenge from Jito"; Transliteration: "Jito kara no chousenjyo" (Japanese: 次籐からの挑戦状)	January 6, 2002
15	"Hot Number 10 from a Snow Country"; Transliteration: "Yukiguni no atsuki jyu ban" (Japanese: 雪国の熱き10番)	January 13, 2002
16	"Upsetting Doctor's Decision"; Transliteration: "Munen no Dokta Stoppu" (Japanese: 無念のドクターストップ)	January 20, 2002
17	"Tournaments Final! Nankatsu vs Toho!"; Transliteration: "Kissen! Nankatsu tai Toho!" (Japanese: 決戦! 南葛VS東邦)	January 27, 2002
18	"Drive Shot of Vengeance"; Transliteration: "Shōnen no Doraibu Shuuto" (Japanese: 執念のドライブシュート)	February 3, 2002
19	"Come Back! Tsubasa!"; Transliteration: "Yomigaere! Tsubasa!" (Japanese: よみがえれ! 翼!)	February 10, 2002
20	"Go for it! Japan Junior Youth Team"; Transliteration: "Shido! Nippon Junia Youth" (Japanese: 始動! 日本Jr.ユース)	February 17, 2002
21	"Humiliating Test Match"; Transliteration: "Kutsujoku no Enseishiai" (Japanese: 屈辱の遠征試合)	February 24, 2002
22	"Glorious Number 10"; Transliteration: "Eiko no Sebanggo Jyu" (Japanese: 栄光の背番号10)	March 3, 2002
23	"Golden Combi Reunites"; Transliteration: "Golden Combi Fukkatsu!" (Japanese: ゴールデンコンビ復活)	March 10, 2002
24	"'God of Defense' of Italy"; Transliteration: "Italia no Shugoshin" (Japanese: イタリアの守護神)	March 17, 2002
25	"Genius Juan Diaz"; Transliteration: "Tensai Juan Diaz" (Japanese: 天才ファン・ディアス)	March 24, 2002
26	"An Elegant Commander"; Transliteration: "Karenaru Shireito" (Japanese: 華麗なる司令塔)	March 31, 2002
27	"Painful Yellow Card"; Transliteration: "Tsukon no Yero Kado" (Japanese: 痛恨のイエローカード)	April 4, 2002
28	"Respectable Penalty - Tie-Breaker!"; Transliteration: "Hokori Takaki PK Sen!" (Japanese: 誇り高きPK戦)	April 11, 2002
29	"Grueling Battle! Japan vs. Germany"; Transliteration: "Kessen! Nippon tai Doitsu" (Japanese: 決戦! ニッポンVSドイツ)	April 18, 2002
30	"A Message from Roberto"; Transliteration: "Roberuto kara no dengen" (Japanese: ロベルトからの伝言)	April 25, 2002
31	"Shine in Glory! Japanese Team!"; Transliteration: "Kagayaki! Nippon Daihyo!" (Japanese: 輝け! 日本代表)	May 5, 2002
32	"To the New Field"; Transliteration: "Aratanaru picci he" (Japanese: 新たなるピッチへ)	May 12, 2002
33	"A Soccer Cyborg"; Transliteration: "Sakka Saibogu" (Japanese: サッカーサイボーグ)	May 19, 2002
34	"Santana, the Son of God"; Transliteration: "Kami no ko Santana" (Japanese: 神の子・サンターナ)	June 2, 2002
35	"The Shine of Rosario"; Transliteration: "Rosario no Kagayaki" (Japanese: ロザリオの輝き)	June 9, 2002
36	"The New Dream Land"; Transliteration: "Yumi ni Mita Shitenchi" (Japanese: 夢に見た新天地)	June 16, 2002
37	"Hyuga's Challenge for the Future"; Transliteration: "Hyuga mirai e no Enchousen" (Japanese: 日向、未来への挑戦)	June 23, 2002
38	"Golden Age of Hope"; Transliteration: "Kibou no Golden Eeji" (Japanese: 希望のゴールデンエイジ)	June 30, 2002
39	"Shingo Aoi is Here"; Transliteration: "Aoi Shingo Tojo" (Japanese: 葵新伍登場!)	July 7, 2002
40	"The New Japan National Team!"; Transliteration: "Shin Zen Nippon Youth" (Japanese: 新生・日本代表)	July 14, 2002
41	"Break the Dutch Wall"; Transliteration: "Kuzuke! Hollanda no Kabe!" (Japanese: 崩せ! オランダの壁)	July 21, 2002
42	"Restart to the World"; Transliteration: "Sekai e no Ristaato" (Japanese: 世界へのリスタート)	July 28, 2002
43	"Catalunya's Eagle"; Transliteration: "Katarūnya no washi" (Japanese: カタルーニャの鷹)	August 4, 2002
44	"Run To the Opening Match"; Transliteration: "Kaimaku he mukatte hashire!" (Japanese: 開幕に向かって走れ!)	August 11, 2002
45	"Harsh Notice"; Transliteration: "Hijo senkoku" (Japanese: 非情の宣告)	August 18, 2002
46	"Cross the Bridge of Hope"; Transliteration: "Kibou hashi wo watare" (Japanese: 希望の橋を渡れ!)	August 25, 2002
47	"Hyuga's Italian Debut"; Transliteration: "Hyuga Italia Debyu" (Japanese: 日向イタリアデビュー)	September 1, 2002
48	"Striker in Tears"; Transliteration: "Namida no Sutoraika" (Japanese: 涙のストライカー)	September 8, 2002
49	"Go for 10 Goals, 10 Assists"; Transliteration: "Nerae! 10 Goals, 10 Assist" (Japanese: 狙え! 10ゴール10アシスト)	September 15, 2002
50	"Battle Against the Rivals"; Transliteration: "Shukuteki to no tatakai" (Japanese: 宿敵との闘い)	September 22, 2002
51	"Dream Pitch"; Transliteration: "Akogare no picci" (Japanese: 憧れのピッチ)	September 29, 2002
52	"Warriors in the Field"; Transliteration: "Fiirudo no Senshitachi" (Japanese: フィールドの戦士たち)	October 6, 2002

== Captain Tsubasa (2018) ==
=== Elementary School Arc - Shōgakusei-Hen ===
No.	Title	Original release date	English air date
1	"Soar toward the great sky!" Transliteration: "Ōzora ni Habatake!" (Japanese: 大空にはばたけ！)	April 2, 2018	August 4, 2018
2	"Take flight!" Transliteration: "Tondā!" (Japanese: とんだっ！)	April 9, 2018	August 5, 2018
3	"New Nankatsu soccer club start" Transliteration: "Nyū Nankatsu sakkā-bu sutāto" (Japanese: ニュー南葛小サッカー部スタート)	April 16, 2018	August 11, 2018
4	"Tsubasa and Roberto"; Transliteration: "Tsubasa to Roberuto" (Japanese: 翼とロベルト)	April 23, 2018	August 12, 2018
5	"Road to the Inter-School Tournament"; Transliteration: "Taikō-sen e Mukete" (Japanese: 対抗戦へ向けて)	April 30, 2018	August 18, 2018
6	"Kick off! Nankatsu vs. Shutetsu"; Transliteration: "Kikkuofu! Nankatsu VS Shūtetsu" (Japanese: キックオフ！ 南葛VS修哲)	May 7, 2018	August 19, 2018
7	"Tsubasa, The Versatile Player"; Transliteration: "Fantajisuta Tsubasa" (Japanese: ファンタジスタ翼)	May 14, 2018	August 25, 2018
8	"The Birth of Nankatsu’s Golden Duo!"; Transliteration: "Tanjō! Nankatsu Gōruden Konbi" (Japanese: 誕生！ 南葛黄金（ゴールデン）コンビ)	May 21, 2018	August 26, 2018
9	"Invigorating Last Scene"; Transliteration: "Sawayakana Makugire" (Japanese: さわやかな幕切れ)	May 28, 2018	September 1, 2018
10	"Kojiro Appears"; Transliteration: "Kojirō Arawaru" (Japanese: 小次郎あらわる)	June 4, 2018	September 2, 2018
11	"Surprisingly Difficult Match"; Transliteration: "Omowanu Kusen" (Japanese: 思わぬ苦戦)	June 11, 2018	September 8, 2018
12	"Crushing Wakabayashi"; Transliteration: "Wakabayashi Tsubushi" (Japanese: 若林つぶし)	June 18, 2018	September 9, 2018
13	"And Then, The Nationals!"; Transliteration: "Sā Zenkoku Da!" (Japanese: さァ全国だ！)	June 25, 2018	September 15, 2018
14	"Burn Nankatsu To Beat Meiwa"; Transliteration: "Moeru Nankatsu Meiwa o Taose" (Japanese: 燃えろ南葛 明和を倒せ！)	July 2, 2018	November 18, 2018
15	"I Can't Lose Because It's My Dream!"; Transliteration: "Yume Dakara Makenai!" (Japanese: 夢だから負けない！)	July 9, 2018	November 24, 2018
16	"This is Acrobatic Soccer!"; Transliteration: "Kore ga Akurobatto Sakkā Da!" (Japanese: これがアクロバットサッカーだ！)	July 16, 2018	November 25, 2018
17	"Last 4 Minutes! Decisive Battle in the Air"; Transliteration: "Nokori 4-bu! Kūchū Kessen" (Japanese: のこり4分！ 空中決戦)	July 23, 2018	December 30, 2018
18	"Let's go! The Decisive Tournament"; Transliteration: "Ikuzo! Kesshō Tōnamento" (Japanese: いくぞ！ 決勝トーナメント)	July 30, 2018	January 6, 2019
19	"Fierce fight! Meiwa VS Furano"; Transliteration: "Gekitō! Meiwa VS Furano" (Japanese: 激闘！ 明和VSふらの)	August 6, 2018	January 13, 2019
20	"Musashi's Secret Plan"; Transliteration: "Musashi no Hisaku" (Japanese: 武蔵の秘策)	August 13, 2018	January 20, 2019
21	"The Ace of Glass"; Transliteration: "Garasu no Ēsu" (Japanese: ガラスのエース)	August 20, 2018	January 27, 2019
22	"Additional Time of Destiny"; Transliteration: "Unmei no Adishonaru Taimu" (Japanese: 運命のアディショナルタイム)	August 27, 2018	February 3, 2019
23	"The Prodigy Goalkeeper Returns!"; Transliteration: "Tensai Kīpā Fukkatsu!" (Japanese: 天才キーパー復活！)	September 3, 2018	February 10, 2019
24	"Tenacity, Definitely Tenacity!"; Transliteration: "Shūnen… Masani Shūnen!!" (Japanese: 執念…まさに執念！！)	September 10, 2018	February 17, 2019
25	"Blazing Counter Attack"; Transliteration: "Honō no Kauntā Atakku" (Japanese: 炎のカウンターアタック)	September 17, 2018	February 24, 2019
26	"Illusory Goal"; Transliteration: "Maboroshi no Gōru" (Japanese: 幻のゴール)	September 24, 2018	March 3, 2019
27	"Moment of Glory"; Transliteration: "Eikō no Shunkan" (Japanese: 栄光の瞬間)	October 1, 2018	March 10, 2019
28	"Everyone's Setting Off"; Transliteration: "Sorezore no Tabidachi" (Japanese: それぞれの旅立ち)	October 8, 2018	March 17, 2019

=== Middle School Arc - Chūgakusei-Hen ===
No.	Title	Original release date	English air date
29	"The Summer Starts!"; Transliteration: "Natsu no Sutāto!" (Japanese: 夏の開幕(スタート)！)	October 15, 2018	March 24, 2019
30	"Prefectural Tournament Final Game! Falcon Shoot Appeared!"; Transliteration: "Kentaikai Kesshōsen! Hayabusa Shūto Tōjō!" (Japanese: 県大会決勝戦！ 隼シュート登場！)	October 22, 2018	March 31, 2019
31	"The Falcon vs. Tsubasa"; Transliteration: "Hayabusa tai Tsubasa" (Japanese: 隼対翼)	October 29, 2018	April 7, 2019
32	"Overthrow Tsubasa! Hyuga versus Misugi"; Transliteration: "Datō Tsubasa! Hyūga tai Misugi" (Japanese: 打倒翼！ 日向対三杉)	November 5, 2018	April 14, 2019
33	"Tokyo Tournament Conclusion"; Transliteration: "Tōkyō Taikai Kecchaku" (Japanese: 東京大会決着)	November 12, 2018	April 21, 2019
34	"Fierce Battle Opening! Tournament Start"; Transliteration: "Gekisen Kaimaku! Taikai Sutāto" (Japanese: 激戦開幕！ 大会スタート)	November 19, 2018	April 28, 2019
35	"The Explosive Power of the Razor"; Transliteration: "Kamisori Pawā Bakuhatsu" (Japanese: カミソリパワー爆発)	November 26, 2018	May 5, 2019
36	"Everyone's Decision"; Transliteration: "Sorezore no Ketsui" (Japanese: それぞれの決意)	December 3, 2018	May 12, 2019
37	"Skylab Hurricane!"; Transliteration: "Sukairabu·Harikēn" (Japanese: スカイラブ・ハリケーン！)	December 10, 2018	May 19, 2019
38	"Assault! Tachibana Brothers"; Transliteration: "Kōryaku! Tachibana Kyōdai" (Japanese: 攻略！ 立花兄弟)	December 17, 2018	May 26, 2019
39	"Nankatsu versus Hanawa Conclusion!"; Transliteration: "Nankatsu tai Hanawa Kecchaku!" (Japanese: 南葛対花輪 決着！)	December 24, 2018	June 2, 2019
40	"Furano Goes to the Front!"; Transliteration: "Furano Shutsujin!" (Japanese: ふらの出陣！)	January 7, 2019	June 9, 2019
41	"The Fearful Dark Horse"; Transliteration: "Kyōfu no Dāku Hōsu" (Japanese: 恐怖の伏兵(ダークホース))	January 14, 2019	June 16, 2019
42	"Phoenix Tsubasa"; Transliteration: "Fenikkusu・Tsubasa" (Japanese: 不死鳥(フェニックス)・翼)	January 21, 2019	June 23, 2019
43	"The Fierce Tiger Encouragements"; Transliteration: "Mōko Gekiru" (Japanese: 猛虎ゲキる)	January 28, 2019	June 30, 2019
44	"Number 10 vs Number 10"; Transliteration: "Sebangō 10 tai Sebangō 10" (Japanese: 背番号10対背番号10)	February 4, 2019	July 7, 2019
45	"Tears in Airport"; Transliteration: "Namida no Eapōto" (Japanese: 涙のエアポート)	February 11, 2019	July 14, 2019
46	"Kick off of the Century"; Transliteration: "Seiki no Kikkuofu" (Japanese: 世紀のキックオフ)	February 18, 2019	July 21, 2019
47	"Confrontation of Destiny Once More"; Transliteration: "Shukumei no Taiketsu Futatabi" (Japanese: 宿命の対決ふたたび)	February 25, 2019	—
48	"The King Toho"; Transliteration: "Ōja Tōhō!" (Japanese: 王者・東邦！)	March 4, 2019	—
49	"Incandescent Fighters, the Fierce Tiger and Tsubasa"; Transliteration: "Shakunetsu no Tōshi Mōko & Tsubasa" (Japanese: 灼熱の闘士 猛虎&翼)	March 11, 2019	—
50	"All-out war of Tenacity"; Transliteration: "Shūnen no Sōryoku-sen" (Japanese: 執念の総力戦)	March 18, 2019	—
51	"Miracle Drive Shoot!"; Transliteration: "Mirakuru Doraibu Shūto!" (Japanese: ミラクルドライブシュート！)	March 25, 2019	—
52	"Endless Dream"; Transliteration: "Endoresu Dorīmu" (Japanese: エンドレス・ドリーム)	April 1, 2019	—

== Captain Tsubasa 2nd Season (2023) ==
=== Junior Youth Arc - Juniayūsu-Hen ===
No.	Title (Note: All English episode titles taken from Crunchyroll.)	Original release date	English air date
1	"A New Challenge"; Transliteration: "Aratanaru Chōsen" (Japanese: 新たなる挑戦)	October 1, 2023	—
2	"Greetings to an Old Rival"; Transliteration: "Kyūteki e no Aisatsu" (Japanese: 旧敵への挨拶)	October 8, 2023	—
3	"Professional Warrior"; Transliteration: "Puro no Senshi!" (Japanese: プロの戦士！)	October 15, 2023	—
4	"Starting Again from Zero"; Transliteration: "Zero kara no Sai Shuppatsu" (Japanese: ゼロからの再出発)	October 22, 2023	—
5	"Another Heavy Hitter"; Transliteration: "Mō Hitori no Jitsuryoku-sha" (Japanese: もうひとりの実力者)	October 29, 2023	—
6	"Action! Japan Junior Youth!"; Transliteration: "Yakudō! Nihondaihyō Juniayūsu!" (Japanese: 躍動！日本代表ジュニアユース！)	November 5, 2023	—
7	"Converge on Paris!!"; Transliteration: "Pari Dai Shūketsu!!" (Japanese: パリ大集結!!)	November 12, 2023	—
8	"I'm Taro Misaki"; Transliteration: "Boku wa Misaki Tarō" (Japanese: ボクは岬太郎)	November 19, 2023	—
9	"A Great Journey!"; Transliteration: "Ōinaru Tabidachi!" (Japanese: 大いなる旅立ち！)	November 26, 2023	—
10	"They`ve Returned! The Golden Duo!!"; Transliteration: "Kanzen Fukkatsu！ Gōruden Konbi" (Japanese: 完全復活！黄金(ゴールデン)コンビ)	December 3, 2023	—
11	"The Fierce Tiger Awakens"; Transliteration: "Mōko no Mezame" (Japanese: 猛虎の目覚め)	December 10, 2023	—
12	"Destined for Victory"; Transliteration: "Yūshō e no Shukumei" (Japanese: 優勝への宿命)	December 17, 2023	—
13	"A Pledge in the Starry Sky"; Transliteration: "Hoshizora no Chikai" (Japanese: 星空の誓い)	December 24, 2023	—
14	"Never Give Up"; Transliteration: "Nebāgibuappu" (Japanese: ネバーギブアップ)	January 7, 2024	—
15	"Japan Junior Youth Strikes Back"; Transliteration: "Gyakushū no Nihondaihyō Juniayūsu" (Japanese: 逆襲の日本代表ジュニアユース)	January 14, 2024	—
16	"A Battle of Ups and Downs"; Transliteration: "Shīsōgēmu no Kōbō" (Japanese: シーソーゲームの攻防)	January 21, 2024	—
17	"The Young Noble of the Field Returns!!"; Transliteration: "Kikōshi Fukkatsu!!" (Japanese: 貴公子復活!!)	January 28, 2024	—
18	"The Top Four Assemble!"; Transliteration: "Besuto 4 Shūketsu!" (Japanese: ベスト4集結！)	February 4, 2024	—
19	"The Ball of Fire Revealed"; Transliteration: "Hinotama no Shōtai" (Japanese: 火の玉の正体)	February 11, 2024	—
20	"The Battle Begins!! Japan vs. France"; Transliteration: "Kaisen!! Nihon tai Furansu" (Japanese: 開戦!!日本対フランス)	February 18, 2024	—
21	"10 vs. 11"; Transliteration: "10 Hito VS. 11 Hito" (Japanese: 10人VS.11人)	February 25, 2024	—
22	"The Elegant Beast Attacks"; Transliteration: "Bi-Jū no Raishū" (Japanese: 美獣の来襲)	March 3, 2024	—
23	"Misaki vs. Pierre"; Transliteration: "Misaki VS. Piēru" (Japanese: 岬VS.ピエール)	March 10, 2024	—
24	"Overtime in the Rain"; Transliteration: "Ame no Naka no Enchō-sen" (Japanese: 雨の中の延長戦)	March 17, 2024	—
25	"A Wounded Final Defense"; Transliteration: "Kizu-Darake no Shishu" (Japanese: 傷だらけの死守)	March 24, 2024	—
26	"The Miracle Fist"; Transliteration: "Kiseki o Yobu Ken" (Japanese: 奇跡をよぶ拳)	March 31, 2024	—
27	"The Lions of the Final"; Transliteration: "Kesshō no Shishi-tachi!" (Japanese: 決勝の獅子たち！)	April 7, 2024	—
28	"A Shooting Storm"; Transliteration: "Shūto no Arashi" (Japanese: シュートの嵐)	April 14, 2024	—
29	"Schneider vs. Wakabayashi"; Transliteration: "Shunaidā VS. Wakabayashi" (Japanese: シュナイダーVS.若林)	April 21, 2024	—
30	"A Blazing First Point"; Transliteration: "Honō no Senshu-ten" (Japanese: 炎の先取点)	April 28, 2024	—
31	"The Most Powerful Shot in History"; Transliteration: "Shijō Saikyō no Shūto" (Japanese: 史上最強のシュート)	May 5, 2024	—
32	"A Hat in Tatters"; Transliteration: "Chigireta Bōshi" (Japanese: ちぎれた帽子)	May 12, 2024	—
33	"Respond to the Message!"; Transliteration: "Messēji ni Kotaero!" (Japanese: メッセージにこたえろ！)	May 19, 2024	—
34	"A Glimpse At Global Greatness!?"; Transliteration: "Sekai'ichi ga Mieta!?" (Japanese: 世界一が見えた!?)	May 26, 2024	—
35	"It's Done!"; Transliteration: "Kecchaku!" (Japanese: 決着！)	June 2, 2024	—
36	"A promise to the sky" Transliteration: "Ōzora e no Chikai" (Japanese: 大空への誓い)	June 9, 2024	—
37	"Confession!"; Transliteration: "Kokuhaku!" (Japanese: 告白！)	June 16, 2024	—
38	"On to a New Time!"; Transliteration: "Atarashī toki e!" (Japanese: 新しい時へ！)	June 23, 2024	—
39	"Soaring Wings"; Transliteration: "Tobi tatsu tsubasa" (Japanese: 翔び立つ翼)	June 30, 2024	—
