= List of Dororon Enma-kun episodes =

Dororon Enma-kun is an anime series created by Go Nagai. It features a group known as the Yōkai Patrol who come from Hell in order to hunt demons roaming in the real world. The original anime series was produced by Toei Animation and aired in Japan between October 4, 1973 and March 28, 1974. The opening theme for the anime was "Dororon Enma-kun" (ドロロンえん魔くん) and the ending theme was "Be Careful of Ghosts" (妖怪にご用心, Yōkai ni go Yōjin), both performed by Chika Nakayama. A remake of the anime, titled Dororon Enma-kun MeeraMera, is being produced by Brain's Base and began airing in Japan on April 7, 2011. The opening theme is "Soul Burning at 1,000,000,000,000°C" (魂メラめら一兆°C！, Tamashii Mera Mera Icchou°C), performed by Masaaki Endoh, while the ending theme is "Everyone's Exhausted ZZZ" (みんなくたばるｻｧｻｧｻｧ, Minna Kutabura Sasasa) by Moon Riders feat. yoko.

== Episode list ==
=== Dororon Enma-kun (1973-1974) ===
No.	Title	Directed by	Written by	Original release date
1	"The Fellows From Hell"; Transliteration: "jigoku karakita yatsura" (Japanese: 地獄から来た奴ら)	Kimio Yabuki	Masaki Tsuji	October 4, 1973
The Yokai Patrol arrive in the human realm to relieve Daracura of his duties. A young boy named Tsutomu gets mixed in a battle between Enma and three rouge yokai.
2	"The Terrifying Yokai Apartment Complex"; Transliteration: "kyōfu no yōkai danchi" (Japanese: 恐怖の妖怪団地)	Keisuke Morishita	Masaki Tsuji	October 11, 1973
Tsutomu's friend, Harumi is nearly attacked by a life sucking yokai.
3	"Great Yokai of The Rotting Lake"; Transliteration: "kusatta kawa no dai yōkai" (Japanese: くさった川の大妖怪)	Yasuo Yamayoshi	Tadaki Yamazaki	October 18, 1973
Humans go insane after getting their backs severely scratched up by a yokai.
4	"Yokai Tatamigaeshi"; Transliteration: "yōkai tatamigaeshi" (Japanese: 妖怪たたみ返し)	Bonjin Nagaki	Shun'ichi Yukimuro	October 25, 1973
Tsutomu and his class fall under a yokai's control.
5	"Beautiful Roses Have Thorns"; Transliteration: "utsukushii bara nihatogegaaru" (Japanese: 美しいバラにはとげがある)	Akinori Orai	Masaki Tsuji	November 1, 1973
Yokai Barbara steals the "beautiful parts" from her victims.
6	"Yokai Jigokuokuri"; Transliteration: "yōkai jigoku okuri" (Japanese: 妖怪地獄おくり)	Takenori Kawada	Tadaki Yamazaki	November 8, 1973
A ghastly taxi driver terrorizes humans.
7	"Yokai Asunarokozo"; Transliteration: "yōkai asunarokozō" (Japanese: 妖怪あすなろ小僧)	Masamune Ochiai	Shun'ichi Yukimuro	November 15, 1973
A yokai wants to become a human boy.
8	"Yokai Mimizuki"; Transliteration: "yōkai mimizuki" (Japanese: 妖怪耳ずき)	Kimio Yabuki	Masaki Tsuji	November 22, 1973
Chapeauji's cousin attacks Tokyo by creating illusions with his ultrasonic powers. Daracura lures Enma in a trap.
9	"The Day All of Japan Explodes"; Transliteration: "nippon rettō dai bakuhatsu no hi" (Japanese: 日本列島大爆発の日)	Hidenori Yamaguchi	Shozo Uehara	November 29, 1973
Kobanzame is a lonely yokai who wants a big brother. Another yokai, Dokuro uses her to collect souls.
10	"Tears of A Yokai"; Transliteration: "yōkai no namida" (Japanese: 妖怪の涙)	Norio Suzuki	Masaki Tsuji	December 6, 1973
Yokai Kyuusuichou seeks revenge after Enma attempts to kill her son. Princess Yukiko is wounded.
11	"Yokai Amejoro"; Transliteration: "yōkai ame jorō" (Japanese: 妖怪雨女郎)	Akinori Orai	Tadaki Yamazaki	December 13, 1973
An alluring and deadly yokai appears on rainy nights to seduce men.
12	"Yokai Hihijii"; Transliteration: "yōkai hihi jii" (Japanese: 妖怪火々爺)	Takeshi Shirado	Masaki Tsuji	December 20, 1973
Enma battles against an ancient yokai who possesses incredibly strong fire power. Tsutomu's class gets straded in a blizzard.
13	"The Yokai Kamaitachi Triplets"; Transliteration: "yōkai kamaitachi sankyōdai" (Japanese: 妖怪かまいたち三兄弟)	Takenori Kawada	Shozo Uehara	December 27, 1973
Princess Yukiko is captured and forced to marry the Kamaitachi Triplets.
14	"Volcanic Eruption! A Tidal Wave! Tokyo in Crisis"; Transliteration: "funka da! tsunami da! tōkyō pinchi" (Japanese: 噴火だ!津波だ!東京ピンチ)	Masamune Ochiai	Shozo Uehara	January 10, 1974
The Yokai Patrol investigate a recent series of missing shinkansen.
15	"Challenge! Lord Enma"; Transliteration: "chōsen! enma daiō" (Japanese: 挑戦!えん魔大王)	Hidenori Yamaguchi	Masaki Tsuji	January 17, 1974
Enma is imprisoned by his uncle, Lord Enma.
16	"The Great Beast Zouwashii"; Transliteration: "dai kaijū zōwashi" (Japanese: 大怪獣ゾウワシ)	Bonjin Nagaki	Shozo Uehara	January 24, 1974
An mammoth-like yokai terrorizes the village where Tsutomu's grandfather lives.
17	"Great Yokai Of Narugamiyama"; Transliteration: "narukami yama no dai yōkai" (Japanese: なるかみ山の大妖怪)	Akinori Orai	Tadaki Yamazaki	January 31, 1974
A yeti-like creature has been kidnapping people in the mountainside.
18	"Yokai Iyomanto's Revenge"; Transliteration: "yōkai iyomanto no fukushū" (Japanese: 妖怪イヨマントの復讐)	Kimio Yabuki	Masaki Tsuji	February 7, 1974
Enma battles a kindhearted yokai who poses as a bearskin rug to be near a human woman.
19	"Yokai Madoromin"; Transliteration: "yōkai madoromin" (Japanese: 妖怪まどろ眠)	Tomoharu Katsumata	Masaki Tsuji	February 14, 1974
The entire city is put to sleep by a mysterious fog.
20	"Yokai Kogarashikozo"; Transliteration: "yōkai kogarashikozō" (Japanese: 妖怪木枯し小僧)	Yasuo Yamayoshi	Shozo Uehara	February 21, 1974
A yokai has the ability to control animals with his whistle.
21	"The Ghastly Dororon Ship"; Transliteration: "goyōsen dororon gō" (Japanese: 御妖船ドロロン号)	Kimio Yabuki	Masaki Tsuji	February 28, 1974
The Yokai Patrol steal Lord Enma's ship to face off against yokai Ghoship.
22	"The Hellish Yokai Villa"; Transliteration: "yōkai jigoku bessō" (Japanese: 妖怪地獄別荘)	Akinori Orai	Masaki Tsuji	March 7, 1974
Tsutomu visits the new Hellish Yokai Villa. Kappaeru terrorizes Tokyo under yokai Sunekozou's control.
23	"Yokai Daddy"; Transliteration: "yōkai tōchan" (Japanese: 妖怪父ちゃん)	Satoshi Dezaki	Shozo Uehara	March 14, 1974
A kind yokai poses as a young boy's missing father. Daracura works with a gang to expose him.
24	"The Crazed Yokai Ryuugyo"; Transliteration: "yōkai kurutta ryuugyo" (Japanese: 妖怪くるった竜魚)	Tomoharu Katsumata	Tadaki Yamazaki	March 21, 1974
Ryuugyo, the guardian of a great lake, has become corrupted by pollution.
25	"The Great Decisive Yokai Battle"; Transliteration: "yōkai dai kessen" (Japanese: 妖怪大決戦)	Masayuki Akehi	Masaki Tsuji	March 28, 1974
Yokai Daikinkai plots a coup against Lord Enma. Enma sacrifices himself to save Princess Yukiko.

=== Dororon Enma-kun MeeraMera (2011) ===
No.	Title	Original release date
1	"It's the Shōwa Era! Here comes Enma! Demons come forth!" Transliteration: "Shōwa da! Enma da! Yōkai Shūgō!" (Japanese: 昭和だ!えん魔だ!妖怪集合!)	April 8, 2011
As a girl named Harumi ends up sneaking into their school with her friends, she soon finds the faces of her friends have mysteriously vanished. When Harumi nearly drowns in a pool while trying to escape, she is rescued by a kappa named Kapaeru, who takes her to an underground base where she meets also meets the ice princess Yukiko and the fiery mage, Enma, who together form the Yōkai patrol, a group sent from hell to stop demons that appear on the surface. Determining the culprit is a face-eating demon, Harumi offers to lure out the demon so that Enma and co can attack it. Although Harumi finds the beast, due to Enma's laziness her face is also stolen by the time they arrive. Enma ensues in battle with the demon and, despite showing no disregard to the innocent faces while smashing it with his fiery hammer, manages to kill the demon and return all the faces to their rightful bodies.
2	"Demons Everywhere you Turn"; Transliteration: "Migi mo hidari mo yōkai-darake ja〜gozan sen ka" (Japanese: 右も左も妖怪だらけじゃ〜ござんせんか)	April 15, 2011
While Harumi and her class are on a school trip to an amusement park, they are attacked by a Squid Demon named Walter Geso. Despite taking Yukiko hostage as well, Enma manages to free all the hostages and defeat the demon, albeit destroying the park in the process. Afterward, Yukiko and the others explain to Harumi how they were summoned by the Great King Enma, Enma's uncle, to travel to the human realm to stop escaping demons. Their first case involves fighting demons named Snakejar and Shock Willow. After the flashback, Harumi reveals that he teacher, Ms. Chiko, had been acting weird recently, and upon investigating her, they find a strange mark on her leg.
3	"Bigger is Better?"; Transliteration: "Ōkii koto wa ii koto ka?" (Japanese: 大きいコトはイイことか?)	April 22, 2011
After learning that Ms. Chiko had been infected poisonous smoke from a demon known as Dokuro, designed to make her ripe enough to eat in three days, Enma engages her in battle but is forced to retreat before he can remove the poison. With the third day approaching, the Yokai patrol decide to have Yukiko take Ms. Chiko's place. After Yukiko and Harumi carefully obtain Ms. Chiko's underwear to wear in order to complete her disguise, Dokoro appears and is quickly finished by Enma.
4	"You're Her Dream"; Transliteration: "Anta ano ko no yume nano sa" (Japanese: あんた あの子の夢なのさ)	April 29, 2011
Harumi falls unconscious after finding a strange cat. Yukiko brings them both into the lair, but she ends up being put to sleep too. Chappeuji concludes that this is a work of a Yokai named Nekomu, who puts humans to sleeps and messes with their dreams. Enma attempts to use some rather dubious means to wake Yukiko up, but he and the others end up falling asleep too, ending up in a dream world where everyone is forced to boogie. They soon learn that a huge demon is gathering together the unconscious humans and turning them into yokai. Nekomu attempts to stop them from waking up, but Enma takes advantage of the fact he's in a dream to make himself into a mech which slices off Nekomu's tail, allowing everyone to wake up. Enma then proceeds to kill the demons which reverts everyone else to normal. Afterwards, they spot one of the culprits behind the plot, the mysterious witch, Enpi.
5	"An All-Girl's Competition in the Beehive...with Chappeauji?"; Transliteration: "On'na-darake no dai hachi no su taikai! Shappo jii mo oru kamo?" (Japanese: 女だらけの大ハチの巣大会! シャッポじいもおるかも?)	May 6, 2011
Whilst trying to find the Yokai Patrol concerning a case of bees causing people to become brainless, Harumi spots Enpi talking with the beehive demon behind it. Although Enma manages to outdo the demon, he and Kapaeru get distracted keeping a bee out of Yukiko's yukata and get stung, reverting their brains to infant-like states. As Yukiko and Harumi's attempts at taking over the main hero role fail, the demon challenges them to a series of events, promising to restore everyone's brains if they win more than half of them. However, during one of the events, the demon ends up ticking off Enpi and gets beaten up, allowing Yukiko the chance to reverse the nature of Enma's flame stick and kill the demon. They later return everyone's brains, only to get them mixed up.
6	"Roly-poly Shock"; Transliteration: "Atto Odoroku Gorogoro" (Japanese: あっと驚くゴロゴロ～)	May 13, 2011
As a new student named Goro Goro enters Harumi's class, various people, including Harumi and Kapaeru, find themselves inflated into a blimp-like form with an insatiable appetite, with anything they touch also becoming fat. As the Yokai patrol lure out Goro Goro, whose real identity is a Yokai named Fukurashiko, they are ambushed by Enpi and turned fat as well. They end up bouncing all over the world, eventually ending up on the moon, where Enma, Yukiko and Enpi, who was also made fat, simultaneously kill Fukurashiko, returning everyone to normal.
7	"Let's Crawl our Way There"; Transliteration: "Nonbiri haou yo, Oira-tachi" (Japanese: のんびり這おうよ、おいらたち)	May 20, 2011
The world is struck with a phenomenon that causes people to constantly fall over in a comedic way, forcing them to crawl in order to get anywhere. As Enpi denies having any part of this, her pratfall leads to awkward situation for her and the Yokai Patrol whilst at a zoo. Just then, the yokai behind the mess, Sutendouji, revealing that Enma and Enpi are siblings and that he plans to steal Enpi away, attempting to take the Blaze Circlet on Enma's head as a wedding ring. He reveals that the circlet used to be worn by Enpi, but suddenly ended up on Enma's head, which led to Enpi becoming a streaker. Enma fights off Sutendouji and beats him, only killing him by accident. Afterwards, Enma contacts the Great King Enma to ask about the circlet.
8	"Hey! Sit Still and Behave"; Transliteration: "Oyoyo! Jitto Gaman no Ko de atta" (Japanese: およ妖! じっと我慢のコであった)	May 27, 2011
The school is covered in snow and the Yokai Patrol is attacked by a group of demons, but Enma is too cosy under his kotatsu to do anything about it. They attempt to remove the Blaze Circlet from Enma's head, but Enpi arrives, telling everyone that if it's removed, Enma's full power will be unleashed and destroy the world. As Enma becomes traumatised by memories of his parents, the demons try cornering Yukiko, Harumi and Enpi, but end up getting themselves killed. After the battle, Enma recalls his promise with his parents was to be a good boy so he could get a load of chogokin toys which never came.
9	"Warm and Toasty Mr. Tengu"; Transliteration: "Hokkahoka da yo Tengu-san" (Japanese: ホッカホカだよ天狗さん)	June 3, 2011
10	"Stop Them, Tengu-san!"; Transliteration: "Tomete Kureruna, Tengu-san!" (Japanese: 止めてくれるな、天狗さん)	June 10, 2011
11	"That's Got Nothing to do with Me!"; Transliteration: "Atashi ni wa Kakawari no Nai Koto de gozansu!" (Japanese: あたしにはかかわりのないことでござんす)	June 17, 2011
12	"Until we Meet Again"; Transliteration: "Mata au Hi made" (Japanese: 股合う日まで)	June 24, 2011
The world is about to be purged and Team Enma is locked in a struggle with Team Heaven. They are defeated, and the seal on Enma's Blaze Circlet is broken; he is unleashed, and quickly defeats the members of Team Heaven. Princess Yukiko attempts to calm him down with a kiss, which results in a release of positive erotic energy that inspires everyone to copulate, demons, angels, and humans alike. Afterwards, with the world saved from a purge, Enma and his friends say their goodbyes to Harumi before leaving.

== See also ==
- Demon Prince Enma - A 2006 OVA series based on Dororon Enma-kun.
