= Merak Film S.r.l. =

Italian dubbing studio

- Industry: Dubbing
- Founded: 1980
- Defunct: 2020
- Headquarters: Cologno Monzese, Milan, Italy
- Key people: Ambrogio Ferrario-president
- Owner: Ambrogio Ferrario
- Website: Merak Film

Merak Film S.r.l. was an Italian dubbing studio based in Cologno Monzese, Milan. Founded in 1980 and closed in 2020, the studio commissioned Italian language dubbed versions of numerous anime, cartoons, movies, sitcoms, and other content for its clients. Numerous voice artists worked at the studio.

== Partners ==
- Cartoon Network (Italy)
- Warner Bros.
- Nickelodeon (Italy)
- Mediaset
- RAI

== Content ==
- One Piece
- Detective Conan
- Berserk
- Pokémon
- iCarly
- Hamtaro
- Beyblade
- SpongeBob SquarePants
- Ojarumaru
- Fancy Lala
- Yu-Gi-Oh! GX
- Johnny Test
- Ozzy & Drix
- Bubble Guppies
- Trauma Center
- Invader Zim
- Pokémon: The First Movie
- Pokémon: The Movie 2000
- Pokémon 3: The Movie
- The Batman
- Justice League
- Justice League Unlimited
- Dexter's Laboratory
- Stoked
- Casper's Scare School
- Angel's Friends
- Sgt. Frog
- The Sweeney
- Love, Inc.
- Automan
- Tenspeed and Brown Shoe
- Manimal
- Tokyo Mew Mew
- Yu-Gi-Oh! Duel Monsters
- Yu-Gi-Oh! 5D's
- Power Rangers Lost Galaxy
- The Mystic Knights of Tir Na Nog
- Barney & Friends
- Batman: The Brave and the Bold
- Normal, Ohio
- Totally Spies!
- Triple Z
- Ai Shite Knight
- The Oblongs
- The World of Peter Rabbit and Friends
- Sabrina: The Animated Series
- Odd Job Jack
- Care Bears: Adventures in Care-a-lot
- Puppy in My Pocket: Adventures in Pocketville
- Underdog (TV series)
- RoboDz Kazagumo Hen
- Stitch!
- W.I.T.C.H
- Big Barn Farm
- The Cat in the Hat Knows a Lot About That!
- Almost Naked Animals
- Shaman King
- Flint the Time Detective
- Bad Dog
- Spider-Man Unlimited
- The Tick
- Gadget and the Gadgetinis
- The Why Why Family
- Eek! The Cat
- Bubble Guppies
- Olivia
- The Busy World of Richard Scarry (second dub)
- Busytown Mysteries
- The Adventures of Jimmy Neutron: Boy Genius
- El Tigre: The Adventures of Manny Rivera
- Angelina Ballerina: The Next Steps
- Tottoko Hamutaro Hai!
- Dragon Ball (second dub)
- Dragon Ball Z
- Dragon Ball GT
- My Little Pony: Friendship Is Magic
- Yu-Gi-Oh! Zexal
- and more

== Voice artists ==
- Marco Balzarotti
- Nicola Bartolini Carrassi
- Luca Bottale
- Serena Clerici
- Simone D'Andrea
- Tony Fuochi
- Davide Garbolino
- Leonardo Graziano
- Gianluca Iacono
- Alessandra Karpoff
- Annalisa Longo
- Debora Magnaghi
- Cinzia Massironi
- Maurizio Merluzzo
- Claudio Moneta
- Patrizia Mottola
- Emanuela Pacotto
- Benedetta Ponticelli
- Patrizio Prata
- Alessandro Rigotti
- Lorenzo Scattorin
- Patrizia Scianca
- Marcella Silvestri
- Elisabetta Spinelli
- Paolo Torrisi
- Federica Valenti
- Federico Zanandrea

== See also ==
- Dubbing Brothers International Italia
