= Lupo Alberto (TV series) =

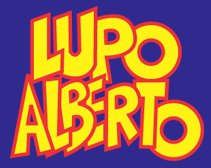
- Genre: Humor
- Created by: Silver
- Based on: Lupo Alberto comics by Silver
- Voices of: Season 1 Tony Fuochi Lella Costa Francesco Salvi Paolo Torrisi; Season 2 Mino Caprio Beatrice Margiotti Saverio Moriones Paolo Torrisi
- Opening theme: "Stress da Lupo" (season 2)
- Composers: Stephan Meer (season 1); Pino Massara (season 2)
- Countries of origin: Italy; France (season 1)
- Original language: Italian
- No. of seasons: 2
- No. of episodes: 104 (list of episodes)

Production
- Executive producers: Giuseppe Laganà; Jean C. Roger (season 1); Alessandro Belli (season 2)
- Running time: 7 minutes
- Production companies: Rai Fiction; The Animation Band; Canal+ (season 1); France 2 (season 1); Les Armateurs (season 1); Mondo TV (season 2)

Original release
- Network: Rai 1 Rai 2 Rai 3 Rai Gulp
- Release: September 3, 1997 – 2005

Lupo Alberto (in English Alberto the Wolf) is an Italian animated series aired for the first time in 1997 by The Animation Band in co-production with Rai, inspired by the homonymous character and the same comic book created by Silver; two series were produced for a total of 104 episodes, each of which lasted for seven minutes. The second season is from 2002.

The first season was produced by Rai Fiction, The Animation Band, Canal+, France 2, Europool and Les Armateurs, and the second by Rai Fiction and The Animation Band, but this time distributed by Mondo TV.

The opening theme of the second season is sung by Gianna Nannini was written by Vic Vergeat. The series is available in Italian and English.

== Characters ==
- Lupo Alberto (in English Alberto the Wolf) - A sarcastic and intelligent blue wolf who is a resident of the wood close to the McKenzie farm, Alberto pursues his relationship with Martha.
- Martha (Marta) - An eccentric and sweet hen who is Alberto's girlfriend.
- Moses (Mosè) - A mean sheepdog who is the obstacle to Alberto and Martha.
- Henry The Mole (Enrico La Talpa) - An eccentric and goofy mole
- Esther The Mole (Cesira La Talpa) - Henry's wife
- Alfred (Alfredo) - A turkey
- Ludwig (Lodovico) - A horse
- Einstein (Odoardo) - Einstein is Martha's cousin
- Glycerin (Glicerina) - A duck who has the nickname
- Krug - A bull
- Omar - A rooster
- Silvietta - A teenage female sparrow
- Arthur (Arturo) - Probably a chicken
- Kant (Alcide) - A philosopher pig
- Alice - Martha's friend, a fat hen

== Voice cast ==
=== Italian ===
Actor (season 1)	Actor (season 2)	Character(s)
Francesco Salvi	Mino Caprio	Lupo Alberto
Lella Costa	Beatrice Margiotti	Martha
Tony Fuochi	Saverio Moriones	Moses
Paolo Torrisi †		Henry The Mole
Roberta Gallina Laurenti	Mariadele Cinquegrani	Esther The Mole
Alberto Olivero	Manfredi Aliquò	Alfred
Alberto Olivero	Massimo De Ambrosis	Ludwig
Alberto Olivero	Riccardo Deodati	Einstein
Alberto Olivero	Mario Bombardieri	Krug
Flavio Arras	Mario Bombardieri	Kant
Luca Bottale	Mino Caprio	Glycerin
?	Giorgina Pazi	Alice
?	Giorgina Pazi	Ausionia
Dania Cericola	Beatrice Margiotti	Ursula
Paola Bonomi	Giorgina Pazi	Esmeralda
?	Fabrizio Mazzotta	Omar
Luca Bottale	No	Gustav
Luca Bottale; Alberto Olivero; Paolo Torrisi	Fabrizio Mazzotta; Monica Ward; Luigi Ferraro; Paolo Lombardi	Various voices

=== English ===
Actor (season 1)	Actor (season 2)	Character(s)
Thor Bishopric	Gregory Snegoff	Lupo Alberto
Holly Gauthier-Frankel	Pat Starke	Martha
Michael Rudder	Nick Alexander	Moses
Rick Jones	Francis Pardeilhan	Henry The Mole
Holly Gauthier-Frankel	?	Esther The Mole
?	Robert Steiner	Glycerin

== Episodes ==
=== Season 1 (1997–1998) ===
No. overall	No. in season	Title	Directed by	Written by	Original release date
1	1	"Senza neve che inverno è"	Unknown	Unknown	September 3, 1997
2	2	"Il pupazzo di neve"	Unknown	Unknown	September 3, 1997
3	3	"L'albero"	TBA	TBA	TBA
4	4	"Tra due giorni è Natale"	TBA	TBA	TBA
5	5	"Regalo di Natale"	TBA	TBA	TBA
6	6	"Un minuto a mezzanotte"	TBA	TBA	TBA
7	7	"Fragile"	TBA	TBA	TBA
8	8	"Babysitting"	TBA	TBA	TBA
9	9	"Condominio"	TBA	TBA	TBA
10	10	"L'inquilino del primo piano"	TBA	TBA	TBA
11	11	"Vota Beppe"	TBA	TBA	TBA
12	12	"Sentieri selvaggi"	TBA	TBA	TBA
13	13	"Acqua e fuoco"	TBA	TBA	TBA
14	14	"Il signore delle acque"	TBA	TBA	TBA
15	15	"Vudù"	TBA	TBA	TBA
16	16	"La parola alla difesa"	TBA	TBA	TBA
17	17	"Il concorso"	TBA	TBA	TBA
18	18	"Bacilli imbecilli"	TBA	TBA	TBA
19	19	"Amore vuol dire gelosia"	TBA	TBA	TBA
20	20	"L'anello"	TBA	TBA	TBA
21	21	"L'infermeria"	TBA	TBA	TBA
22	22	"Una fidanzata per Mosè"	TBA	TBA	TBA
23	23	"La spia spiata"	TBA	TBA	TBA
24	24	"Il giorno del giudizio"	TBA	TBA	TBA
25	25	"Dentista per amore"	TBA	TBA	TBA
26	26	"Ninna nanna"	TBA	TBA	TBA
27	27	"Cappuccetto rosso"	TBA	TBA	TBA
28	28	"La fattoria moderna"	TBA	TBA	TBA
29	29	"Il contratto"	TBA	TBA	TBA
30	30	"Giovani e belli"	TBA	TBA	TBA
31	31	"Sette in condotta"	TBA	TBA	TBA
32	32	"Picnic"	TBA	TBA	TBA
33	33	"Il predone del fiume"	TBA	TBA	TBA
34	34	"Lavoro cercasi"	TBA	TBA	TBA
35	35	"Il corriere del pollaio"	TBA	TBA	TBA
36	36	"Lupastro nello spazio profondo"	TBA	TBA	TBA
37	37	"Il ritorno"	TBA	TBA	TBA
38	38	"Sottozero"	TBA	TBA	TBA
39	39	"La febbre del videoreporter"	TBA	TBA	TBA
40	40	"Trappole nascoste"	TBA	TBA	TBA
41	41	"Il sostituto di Mosè"	TBA	TBA	TBA
42	42	"La finale"	TBA	TBA	TBA
43	43	"McKenzie Park"	TBA	TBA	TBA
44	44	"Il grande occhio"	TBA	TBA	TBA
45	45	"Mekkano"	TBA	TBA	TBA
46	46	"La grande corsa"	TBA	TBA	TBA
47	47	"Vinca il migliore"	TBA	TBA	TBA
48	48	"Autostrada"	TBA	TBA	TBA
49	49	"Il piatto del giorno"	TBA	TBA	TBA
50	50	"Il gabinetto del dott. La talpa"	TBA	TBA	TBA
51	51	"La notte degli ortaggi viventi"	TBA	TBA	TBA
52	52	"La prova del fuoco"	TBA	TBA	TBA

=== Season 2 (2005) ===
No. overall	No. in season	Title	Directed by	Written by	Original release date
1	53	"Ingabbiato"	Unknown	Unknown	April 15, 2005
2	54	"Cercasi rockstar"	TBA	TBA	TBA
3	55	"Giungla di cemento"	TBA	TBA	TBA
4	56	"Gorgheggi e grida"	TBA	TBA	TBA
5	57	"Sussurri e stecche"	TBA	TBA	TBA
6	58	"Boomerang"	TBA	TBA	TBA
7	59	"Gli spaventapasseri"	TBA	TBA	TBA
8	60	"Camper"	TBA	TBA	TBA
9	61	"Il grande Orson"	TBA	TBA	TBA
10	62	"Natale coi fiocchi"	TBA	TBA	TBA
11	63	"Il pranzo di Mosè"	TBA	TBA	TBA
12	64	"Lacrime di coccodrillo"	TBA	TBA	TBA
13	65	"Torte in faccia"	TBA	TBA	TBA
14	66	"Il prezzo del successo"	TBA	TBA	TBA
15	67	"Un biglietto per la felicità"	TBA	TBA	TBA
16	68	"Nervi scoperti"	TBA	TBA	TBA
17	69	"McKenzie Day"	TBA	TBA	TBA
18	70	"Appuntamento al buio"	TBA	TBA	TBA
19	71	"Isteria canina"	TBA	TBA	TBA
20	72	"Le Jene"	TBA	TBA	TBA
21	73	"Binari"	TBA	TBA	TBA
22	74	"Game Over"	TBA	TBA	TBA
23	75	"Arriva il grande cocomero"	TBA	TBA	TBA
24	76	"Cuore d'oro"	TBA	TBA	TBA
25	77	"Vacanze al verde"	TBA	TBA	TBA
26	78	"La rumba del popone"	TBA	TBA	TBA
27	79	"Chi ha paura del lupo cattivo?"	TBA	TBA	TBA
28	80	"I temerari"	TBA	TBA	TBA
29	81	"Selvaggio West"	TBA	TBA	TBA
30	82	"Sotto esame"	TBA	TBA	TBA
31	83	"Lupastro, anzi, grassone"	TBA	TBA	TBA
32	84	"Ultimo spettacolo"	TBA	TBA	TBA
33	85	"Palloni gonfiati"	TBA	TBA	TBA
34	86	"Enrico menagramo"	TBA	TBA	TBA
35	87	"Liscio come l'olio"	TBA	TBA	TBA
36	88	"Giallo vegetale"	TBA	TBA	TBA
37	89	"Di casa ce n'è una sola"	TBA	TBA	TBA
38	90	"Soddisfatti e rimborsati"	TBA	TBA	TBA
39	91	"Ciak, si gira"	TBA	TBA	TBA
40	92	"Carta bollata"	TBA	TBA	TBA
41	93	"Il barboncino mannaro"	TBA	TBA	TBA
42	94	"La forza dell'amore"	TBA	TBA	TBA
43	95	"Senza trucco, senza inganno"	TBA	TBA	TBA
44	96	"Al cuor non si comanda"	TBA	TBA	TBA
45	97	"Aria di tempesta"	TBA	TBA	TBA
46	98	"That's Amore"	TBA	TBA	TBA
47	99	"Ieri, oggi, domani"	TBA	TBA	TBA
48	100	"Il topino dei denti"	TBA	TBA	TBA
49	101	"Storia di uccello"	TBA	TBA	TBA
50	102	"Corso di recupero"	TBA	TBA	TBA
51	103	"La rimpatriata"	TBA	TBA	TBA
52	104	"Bluff"	TBA	TBA	TBA

== Home video ==
Mondo TV has released all of the first season episodes on 9 VHS tapes and 3 DVD releases, including special features.

The second season was released on DVD only, with 9 episodes each on 2 discs with no special features.

The DVD releases contain Italian and English audio.
