= Patrizia Mottola =

Italian voice actress

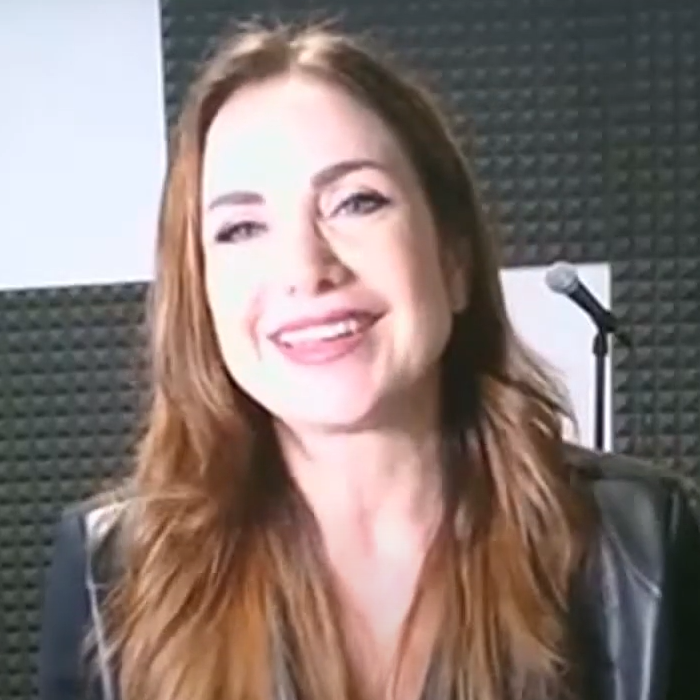
- Occupation: Voice actress

Patrizia Mottola is an Italian voice actress. She contributes to voicing characters in anime, cartoons, and films. She provides the voice of the protagonist Raf in the animated series Angel's Friends. Mottola also voiced the character Hanon Hōshō in the Italian-language version of the anime series Mermaid Melody Pichi Pichi Pitch.

She provides the voice of the protagonist Raf in the animated series Angel's Friends. Mottola also voiced the character Hanon Hōshō in the Italian-language version of the anime series Mermaid Melody Pichi Pichi Pitch.

She has worked at Merak Film, Studio Asci, Studio P.V., and other dubbing studios in Italy.

== Voice work ==
=== Anime and animation ===
- Gordon in Fire Emblem Anime
- Raf in Angel's Friends
- Hanon Hōshō in Mermaid Melody Pichi Pichi Pitch
- Konohamaru Sarutobi in Naruto
- Konohamaru Sarutobi in Naruto: Shippuden
- Mac in Foster's Home for Imaginary Friends
- Maria Kurenai in Vampire Knight
- Shizuka Hio in Vampire Knight Guilty
- Howdy in Hamtaro
- Urmel in Impy's Island
- Tera in Future Boy Conan (Second dub)
- Makoto Konno in The Girl Who Leapt Through Time
- Tarb in Tokyo Mew Mew
- Ritchie in Pokémon
- Jessica Herleins in Gormiti
- Kapuchiinousa in Sugarbunnies
- Kapuchiinousa in Sugarbunnies: Chocolat!
- Kapuchiinousa in Sugarbunnies: Fleur
- Yuria in Legend of Raoh: Chapter of Death in Love
- Vinnie Nasta in The Kids from Room 402
- Peasuke in Dr. Slump
- Baby Bear in Blue's Clues
- Tom in A Kind of Magic
- Kassie Carlen in Tonde Buurin
- Shorty in The Land Before Time X: The Great Longneck Migration
- Littlefoot in The Land Before Time (TV series)
- Madame Frankie Jones in Sarah Lee Jones (since 2010)
- Franklin in Franklin and in Franklin and Friends
- Hoshimi in Maps
- Antonio in Romeo x Juliet
- Nonny in Bubble Guppies
- Megumi in Cyborg Kuro-chan
- Aleu in Balto II: Wolf Quest
- Kai Ichinose in Piano no Mori (film)
- Foxy in The Little Fox
- Ian in Olivia
- Brobot in The Adventures of Jimmy Neutron: Boy Genius
- Nina Harper in Braceface
- Tomoyo Daidouji in Cardcaptor Sakura
- Ed in Ozie Boo!
- Junior in Problem Child
- Pig in Kipper the Dog
- Maurice in The Wacky World of Tex Avery
- Daffodil in Hairy Scary
- Japolo in Shamanic Princess
- Seo Dong in Spheres
- Billy White in Poochini's Yard
- Elliot Kaufmaan in Creepschool
- Cathy Catherine and Vetrix in Yu-Gi-Oh! Zexal
- Mrs. Wicket in Mr. Bean (animated TV series)(Dud Season 5)
- Keita Amano/Nate Adams in Yo-kai Watch

=== Live action ===
- Freddie Benson in iCarly (Seasons 1-3)
- Ned Bigby in Ned's Declassified School Survival Guide
- Aubrey Fleming/Dakota Moss in "I Know Who Killed Me"
- Cookie in Spun
- Young Mother in Incendiary
- Angela in Witches of the Caribbean
- Whitney Port in The Hills
- Justin Stewart in Power Rangers Turbo
- Justin Stewart in Turbo: A Power Rangers Movie
- Ash in Avalon (2001 film)
- Carol in I Hate My 30's
- John Millon in Survivors
- Ninon Chaumette in Plus belle la vie
- Momoko Ryugasaki in Kamikaze Girls
- Jade West in "Victorious"

== See also ==
- List of non-English language iCarly voice actors
