= Marcella Silvestri =

Italian voice actress (born 1961)

- Born: 25 April 1961 (age 65); Genoa, Italy
- Occupation: Voice actress

Marcella Silvestri (born 25 April 1961) is an Italian voice actress. She contributes to voice characters in cartoons, anime, movies and more content.

== Career ==
Silvestri is well known for providing the voice of the protagonist Hamtaro in the Italian language of the anime series Hamtaro. She also provided the voice of Koyuki Azumaya in the Italian-language version of the anime series Keroro Gunso. And She Known The Voice of Misaki Uzumaki in the Italian-language version of the anime series of Naruto.

She has worked at Merak Film, Studio P.V., Studio Asci and other dubbing studios in Italy.

== Voice work ==
=== Anime and animation ===
- Miki in Angel's Friends
- Hay Lin in W.I.T.C.H.
- Hamtaro in Tottoko Hamtaro
- Hamtaro in Tottoko Hamutaro Hai!
- Luna in Ronin Warriors
- Koyuki Azumaya in Keroro Gunso
- Emma in Stoked
- Princess Ami in Puppy in My Pocket: Adventures in Pocketville
- Alice Gehabich in Bakugan Battle Brawlers
- Alice Gehabich in Bakugan Battle Brawlers: New Vestroia
- Simon in Alvin and the Chipmunks (TV series)
- Shirousa in Sugarbunnies
- Shirousa in Sugarbunnies: Chocolat!
- Shirousa in Sugarbunnies: Fleur
- Krillin (First dub) in Dragon Ball Z
- Krillin in Dragon Ball Z: Cooler's Revenge (Second dub)
- Krillin in Dragon Ball Z: Return of Cooler (Second dub)
- Mme. Fluffé in Best Ed
- Angelina Jeanette Mouseling in Angelina Ballerina
- Angelina Jeanette Mouseling in Angelina Ballerina: The Next Steps
- Ruby in Jewelpet
- Miki in Shugo Chara!
- Burdine Maxwell in Bratz (TV series)
- Zoisite (Second voice) in Sailor Moon
- Berthier in Sailor Moon R
- VesVes in Sailor Moon S
- Francis X. Bushlad in Taz-Mania
- Misuzu Midorikawa in Lady!!
- Misuzu Midorikawa and Sophie Montgomery in Hello! Lady Lynn
- Harley Quinn in The Batman
- Doremi Harukaze in Ojamajo Doremi
- Jirōmaru Takaba in Bakusō Kyōdai Let's & Go!!
- Reika in Genesis of Aquarion
- Milo Oblong in The Oblongs
- Benji in Jin Jin and the Panda Patrol
- Ally in Eon Kid
- Yū Inagawa in Comic Party
- Natsue Awayuki in Prétear
- Stashia in Megami Paradise
- Keshimaru in Pastel Yumi, the Magic Idol
- Madoka Ayukawa in Kimagure Orange Road (First dub)
- Corona in Spider Riders
- Kanade Yumeno in Onegai My Melody
- Arnold Perlstein in The Magic School Bus
- Nancy in The Story of Pollyanna, Girl of Love
- Athena Gilnande in Najica Blitz Tactics
- Nut in Magical Angel Sweet Mint
- Arbell, Bellemere, Kodama, Makino (Episode 45), Nico Olvia, and Michael and Hoichael's mother in One Piece
- Shuzo "Shu" Matsutani in Legendz
- Sherry LeBlanc in Yu-Gi-Oh! 5D's
- Miyu in Vampire Princess Miyu
- Ryoko Tsugumo in Area 88
- Lum in Urusei Yatsura 2: Beautiful Dreamer (Second dub)
- Juliet in Romeo x Juliet
- Geo in Team Umizoomi
- Gerty in Pic Me
- Susan Test in Johnny Test
- Sidney Poindexter in Danny Phantom
- Mooris Moony in Ricky Sprocket: Showbiz Boy
- Willow in A Kind of Magic
- Ethelbert the Tiger in Ethelbert the Tiger
- Kyoko Aoi in Future GPX Cyber Formula
- Aiko Nonohara in Hime-chan's Ribbon
- Tsukushi Makino in Boys Over Flowers
- Ken in Floral Magician Mary Bell
- Damia in Bosco Adventure
- Verdi in The Mozart Band
- and others

=== Live action shows and movies ===
- Marie Rogers in Romeo!
- Geena Fabiano in Unfabulous
- Dulcea in Mighty Morphin Power Rangers: The Movie
- Katie in I Hate My 30's
- Raquel 'Rocky' Donatelli in Laguna Beach: The Real Orange County
- Maddie Harrington in Ally McBeal
- Samantha Morgan in Hang Time (TV series)
- Julia Field in Rituals (TV series)
- and others

== See also ==
- List of non-English language Stoked voice actors
