= Elisabetta Spinelli =

Italian voice actress

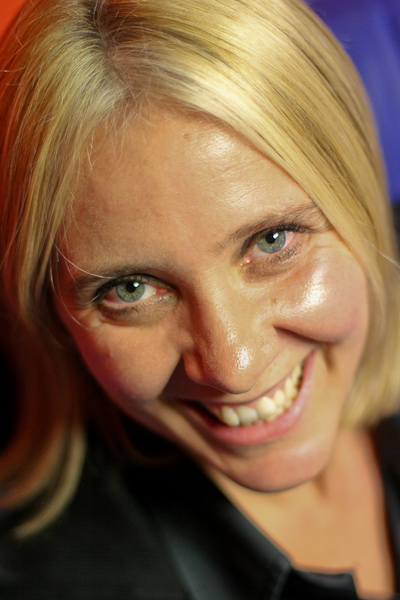
- Born: March 24, 1965 (age 61); Milan, Italy
- Occupation: Voice actress

Elisabetta Spinelli (born March 24, 1965) is an Italian voice actress who contributes to voicing characters in cartoons, anime and more content.

She voices Mela in the animated series Puppy in My Pocket: Adventures in Pocketville. She was also known for voicing Nefertari Vivi in the Italian-language version of One Piece until her role was given to fellow voice actress Alessandra Karpoff. She is also known for voicing in Italian-language Haruka Uchiha in Naruto, Chi Chi in Dragon Ball and Usagi Tsukino in Sailor Moon.

She has worked at Merak Film, Studio Asci and other dubbing studios in Italy.

== Filmography ==
=== Anime and animation ===
- Nefertari Vivi (first voice) in One Piece
- Haruka Uchiha in Naruto
- Haruka Uchiha in Naruto Shippuden
- Chi Chi in Dragon Ball
- Chi Chi in Dragon Ball Z
- Chi Chi in Dragon Ball GT
- Chi Chi in Dragon Ball Super
- Winry Rockbell in Fullmetal Alchemist
- Winry Rockbell in Fullmetal Alchemist: Brotherhood
- Mela in Puppy in My Pocket: Adventures in Pocketville
- Ginevra in Angel's Friends
- Lucia Nanami in Mermaid Melody Pichi Pichi Pitch
- Sailor Moon in Sailor Moon
- Marie (character) in E' un po' magia per Terry e Maggie
- Lala in Magical DoReMi
- Frieda the Foot in Oobi
- Elyon Brown in W.I.T.C.H.
- Pippi Longstocking in Pippi Longstocking
- Angol Mois in Sgt. Frog
- Sloth in Almost Naked Animals
- Penny in Inspector Gadget (second edition)
- Ned in Ozie Boo!
- Lady Deathstrike in X-Men
- Rue in Tomodachi Life: The TV Series
- Runo Misaki in Bakugan Battle Brawlers
- Agent Heather in Gadget Boy & Heather
- Shizuka Kawai in Yu-Gi-Oh! Duel Monsters
- Lettuce Midorikawa in Tokyo Mew Mew
- Princess in Jura Tripper
- Marielle Rodriguez in Sarah Lee Jones
- Shigure in Ninja Scroll: The Series
- Ayu Tateishi in Ultra Maniac
- Eliza Thomas in Kon'nichiwa Anne: Before Green Gables
- Mito in Hunter x Hunter
- Cassandra/Cassy in Ultimate Book of Spells
- Veronica in Maya & Miguel
- Share Bear in Care Bears: Adventures in Care-a-lot
- Nan Harding in Little Women II: Jo's Boys
- Jenny Wakeman in My Life as an Adult Android
- Cathy in Jeanie with the Light Brown Hair
- Lulu in Gaiking: Legend of Daiku-Maryu
- Ursa in Bear in the Big Blue House
- Cleo in Bratz
- Lulu de Morcerf Yamamoto in Shugo Chara!
- Cinderella in Cinderella Monogatari
- Kei in Iria: Zeiram the Animation
- Marie Milgraine Diamas (Second voice) in Miracle Girls
- Rena Uzuki in Najica Blitz Tactics
- Angeletta in Romeo's Blue Skies
- Wilhelmina in Pokémon
- Carol in Pokémon: The Movie 2000
- Lady Rin in Pokémon: Lucario and the Mystery of Mew
- Wendy Darling in Peter Pan and the Pirates
- Seira Mimori in Saint Tail
- Lasty Farson/Angel Rabbie in Tenbatsu! Angel Rabbie
- Kyla in Delgo
- Amanda Carey in Hurricanes
- Emily in Dreamkix
- Kitty Katswell in T.U.F.F. Puppy
- Sassy Saddles in My Little Pony: Friendship Is Magic

=== Live action ===
- June Carter Cash in Walk the Line
- Ángela Vidal in REC
- Sam in Blue's Clues
- Tiffany Monaco in Dr. Dolittle Million Dollar Mutts
- Trudy Kavanagh in S. Darko
- and others

=== Video games ===
- TimeShift
- Keepsake
