= Patrizio Prata =

Italian voice actor and dubbing director (born 1972)

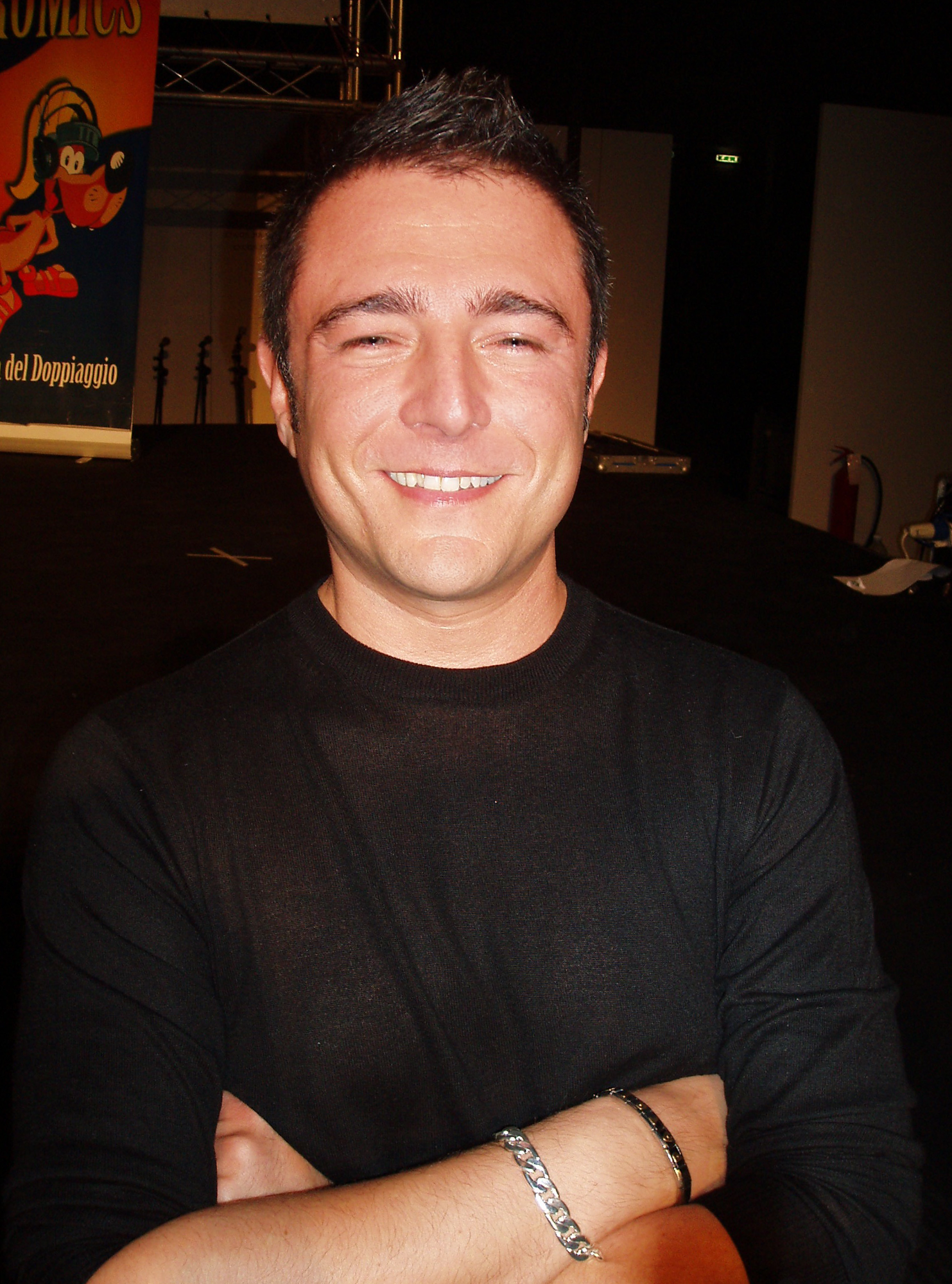
- Patrizio Prata in 2010
- Born: 2 February 1972 (age 54); Milan, Italy
- Occupations: Voice actor, dubbing director

Patrizio Prata (born 2 February 1972 in Milan) is an Italian voice actor and dubbing director who contributes to voicing characters in movies, cartoons, anime, video games and more content. Prata is well known for voicing characters in animated content such as Android #17 in Dragon Ball Z, Roronoa Zoro in One Piece, Kabuto Yakushi in Naruto and Naruto: Shippuden, Jaden Yuki in Yu-Gi-Oh! GX and other famous animated titles to date. He also provides the voice of Geronimo Stilton in the Geronimo Stilton animated series.

Prata is well known for voicing characters in animated content such as Android #17 in Dragon Ball Z, Roronoa Zoro in One Piece, Kabuto Yakushi in Naruto and Naruto: Shippuden, Jaden Yuki in Yu-Gi-Oh! GX and other famous animated titles to date. He also provides the voice of Geronimo Stilton in the Geronimo Stilton animated series.

Prata currently works at Studio P.V., Deneb Film, Merak Film and other dubbing studios in Italy. Since February 2007, he is also the current voice-over host for Disney Channel Italy.

Patrizio Prata has the voiceover of the previews of the VHS and DVD from Disney Video from 1999 until 2001 and Mondo Home Entertainment from 2002 until 2004

== Voice work ==
=== Cartoons and anime ===
- Navarre in Fire Emblem Anime
- Dante Vale in Huntik: Secrets & Seekers
- Geronimo Stilton in Geronimo Stilton
- Weevil Underwood, Mahad, and Marik Ishtar in Yu-Gi-Oh!
- Jaden Yuki in Yu-Gi-Oh! GX
- Jack Atlas in Yu-Gi-Oh! 5D's
- Neestro in Yu-Gi-Oh! Zexal
- Guts in Berserk
- Roronoa Zoro and Jigoro in One Piece
- Roronoa Zoro in One Piece: The Movie
- Roronoa Zoro in Clockwork Island Adventure
- Roronoa Zoro in Chopper's Kingdom on the Island of Strange Animals
- Roronoa Zoro in One Piece The Movie: Dead End no Bōken
- Roronoa Zoro in One Piece: Norowareta Seiken
- Roronoa Zoro in Baron Omatsuri and the Secret Island
- Roronoa Zoro in Giant Mecha Soldier of Karakuri Castle
- Tracey Sketchit in Pokémon
- Tracey Sketchit in Pokémon Chronicles
- Tracey Sketchit in Pokémon: The Movie 2000
- Jack Walker in Pokémon Ranger and the Temple of the Sea
- Marcus in Pokémon: Arceus and the Jewel of Life
- Keiichi Morisato in Ah! My Goddess: The Movie
- Keroro in Keroro Gunso
- Seiya Uzaki in Nurse Angel Ririka SOS
- Ogron in Winx Club
- Butch Pakovski in The Adventures of Jimmy Neutron: Boy Genius
- Kabuto Yakushi in Naruto
- Kabuto Yakushi in Naruto: Shippuden
- Benkei Hanawa in Beyblade: Metal Fusion
- Matt Olsen and Jeek in W.I.T.C.H.
- Conrad L. Lawrence in Blue Dragon
- Max Steel / Josh McGrath in Max Steel
- Superman in Justice League
- Superman in Justice League Unlimited
- Jean Havoc in Fullmetal Alchemist
- Jean Havoc in Fullmetal Alchemist: Brotherhood
- Blue Knight (2nd voice) in Tokyo Mew Mew
- Cedric in Butt-Ugly Martians
- Ed in Ozie Boo!
- Emiliodon in La cueva de Emiliodón
- Marius in Les Misérables: Shōjo Cosette
- Underdog in Underdog
- Doc Samson in The Incredible Hulk
- Chris Carter in Creepy Crawlers
- Yukito Tsukishiro/Yue in Cardcaptor Sakura
- Cyclops in X-Men: Evolution
- Spirou in Spirou et Fantasio
- Himura Kenshin in Rurouni Kenshin
- Tao Ren in Shaman King
- Oxnard in Hamtaro
- Tarō Mitsuki in Mermaid Melody Pichi Pichi Pitch
- Yūhi Aogiri in Ceres, Celestial Legend
- Hiroya Aikawa in Fancy Lala
- Yuri Killian in Kaleido Star
- Goten (older) and Android #17 in Dragon Ball Z
- Akira Sendoh in Slam Dunk
- Abel Nightroad in Trinity Blood
- Kaname Kuran in Vampire Knight
- Ginta Suou in Marmalade Boy
- Terry Bogard in Fatal Fury: The Motion Picture
- Terry Bogard in Fatal Fury 2: The New Battle
- Eric Staufer in Scooby-Doo and the Cyber Chase
- Daniel Illiwara in Scooby-Doo! and the Legend of the Vampire
- Alejo Otero in Scooby-Doo! and the Monster of Mexico
- Nenji Nagihara in Nanaka 6/17
- Arnold Jackson (Season 1 only) and David in Totally Spies!
- Kaname Kuran in Vampire Knight
- Don Quixote in Donkey Xote
- Orphen in Sorcerous Stabber Orphen
- Tyco in Angel's Friends
- Hiroshi Daimon in Nazca
- Byakuya Kuchiki in Bleach: Memories of Nobody
- Luke Valentine in Hellsing Ultimate and Hellsing TV series
- David Schwimmer, Ice Cube, Jimi Hendrix, Leonardo DiCaprio, Prince, and Tom Cruise in Celebrity Deathmatch
- Goh Saruwatari in Godannar
- Shining Armor in My Little Pony: Friendship Is Magic
- Serpo in Dandadan

=== Live action ===
- Jérôme Couturier (2nd voice) and Joël in Premiers Baisers
- Andre Forester in Watch Over Me
- Goodwin Stanhope in Lost
- Len in Kamen Rider: Dragon Knight
- Adam Park in Mighty Morphin Power Rangers
- Adam Park in Mighty Morphin Power Rangers: The Movie
- Adam Park in Power Rangers Zeo
- Adam Park in Power Rangers Turbo
- Adam Park in Turbo: A Power Rangers Movie
- Robert "R.J." James in Power Rangers Jungle Fury
- Geoffrey Tennant in Slings and Arrows
- Jack Ryan in The Big Bounce
- Tobey in Teeth
- Roger Lloyd in The Skulls III
- Jason Wahler in Laguna Beach: The Real Orange County

=== Video games ===
- Kevin Bletchley and Cedric Diggory in Harry Potter: Quidditch World Cup
- Stronghold: Crusader
- Silver
- Ron 'Pointer' Hertz in Chrome
- Call of Duty: Finest Hour
- Santa Claus and Tom Goodman in No One Lives Forever 2: A Spy in H.A.R.M.'s Way
- Alex Balder in Max Payne
- Jack Morton in Covert Ops: Nuclear Dawn
- Tatsumaru and Kimaira in Tenchu: Wrath of Heaven
- Willy and Mariola in Runaway: A Road Adventure
- Marcello in Cinderella Monogatari

== Work as dubbing director ==
- I Hate My 30's
- Yukikaze
- Friday: The Animated Series
- Jewelpet
- Prétear
- The Truth Below
- Worst. Prom. Ever.
