= Rigotto =

Rigotto is an Italian surname. Notable people with the surname include:

- Elia Rigotto (born 1982), Italian cyclist
- Germano Rigotto (born 1949), Brazilian politician

== See also ==
- Ridotto
- Rigotti
