= Saverio Moriones =

Italian actor and voice actor (born 1943)

- Born: Francisco Javier Moriones; 27 June 1943 (age 82); Rome, Italy
- Occupations: Actor; voice actor
- Years active: 1966–2020
- Spouses: Elisabetta Bonino (m. ?-?); Germana Tucci (m. ?)
- Children: 3

Francisco Javier "Saverio" Moriones (born 27 June 1943) is an Italian actor and voice actor.

== Biography ==
Born in Rome to a Spanish father and an Italian mother, Moriones began his career on the children's television show Giocagiò until its cancellation in 1969 but he is more known as a voice dubber. Because of his Spanish origin, Moriones often dubs characters with Hispanic accents and ethnicities. Some of the actors he dubs includes Richard Dean Anderson as the title character of the show MacGyver as well as Joe Pesci in the first two films of the Home Alone franchise.

Moriones is also the regular Italian voice dubbing actor of Danny Trejo. In his animated roles, he voiced Roadkill in the Italian-Language dub of Rango as well as Chicharrón in the Italian-Language dub of Coco. He has even dubbed Slinky Dog only in Toy Story 4 following the death of Piero Tiberi in 2013, then Francesco De Francesco took the turn to dub in Toy Story 5.

=== Personal life ===
Moriones was once married to Elisabetta Bonino, whom he met on the set of Giocagiò. Together, they have one daughter, Amparo and a son, Simon. He also has an additional daughter named Arianna with his current wife Germana Tucci.

== Filmography ==
- Giocagiò - TV show (1966–1969)
- Blow Hot, Blow Cold (1969)

== Voice work ==
=== Animation ===
- Brooks in Sandokan - La tigre della Malesia
- Polyphemus in Ulysses - My Name Is Nobody (Ulisse - Il mio nome è nessuno)
- Moses in Lupo Alberto (season 2)

==== Dubbing ====
- Paul McCartney and Buzz Aldrin in The Simpsons
- Ryoko and Koh in 3×3 Eyes
- Roadkill in Rango
- Chicharrón in Coco
- Costa Rican President in South Park
- Slinky Dog in Toy Story 4

=== Live action ===
- Additional voices in Nirvana

==== Dubbing ====
- Angus MacGyver in MacGyver
- Harry Lime in Home Alone, Home Alone 2: Lost in New York
- Johnny Baca in Con Air
- Slim in Bubble Boy
- El Jefe in XXX
- Mario in La Linea
- The Chief in Fanboys
- Cuchillo in Predators
- Jacob's grandfather in Breaking Wind
- Goldberg in Death Race 3: Inferno
- Guerrero De La Cruz in Dead in Tombstone
- Isador "Machete" Cortez in Machete Kills
- Howling Mad Murdock in The A-Team
- Harry Klein in Derrick
- Blake in Glengarry Glen Ross
- Jack McCoy in Law & Order
- Denny Crane in Boston Legal (Ep. 16–101)
- Richard Thornburg in Die Hard
- Henry Pope in Prison Break
- Ed Tom Bell in No Country for Old Men
- Roland Tembo in The Lost World: Jurassic Park
- John Keller in Transformers
- Chester Phillips in Captain America: The First Avenger

=== Video games ===
- Raul Alfonso Tejada in Fallout: New Vegas
