= Lorenzo Scattorin =

Italian voice actor (born 1971)

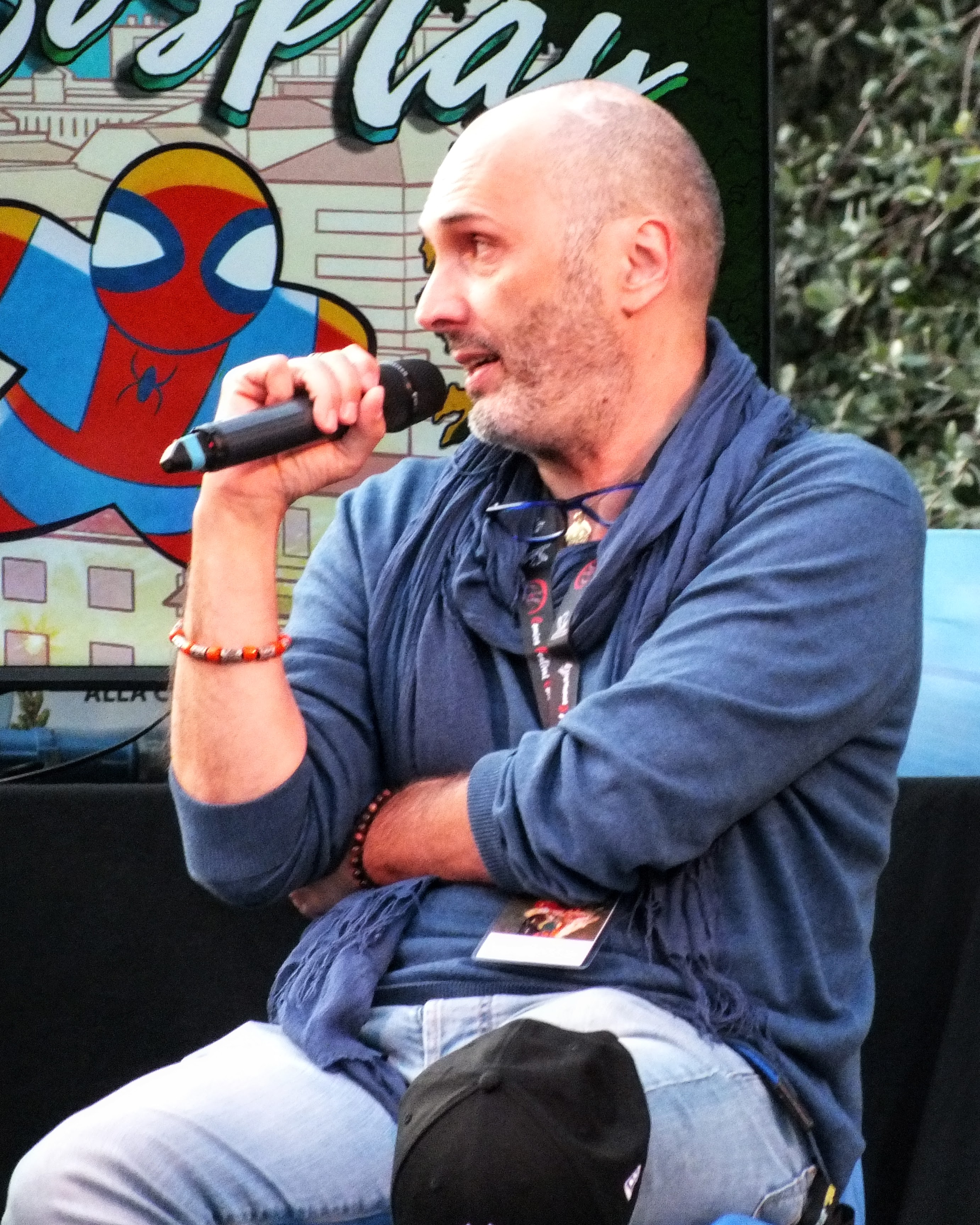
- Lorenzo Scattorin in 2025
- Born: 22 September 1971 (age 55); Milan, Italy
- Occupation: Voice actor

Lorenzo Scattorin (born 22 September 1971) is an Italian voice actor who contributes to voicing characters in movies, cartoons, anime and other content.

He is well known for providing the voice of the character Sanji in the Italian language version of the long-running anime series One Piece and Joel Miller in The Last of Us. Scattorin also voiced Seto Kaiba in the Italian-language version of Yu-Gi-Oh! Duel Monsters.

He provided the voice of the character Hanzo in the video game Overwatch.

He is also the son of actor and voice actor Maurizio Scattorin. He works at Merak Film, Studio Asci, Studio P.V. and other dubbing studios in Italy.

== Voice work ==
=== Animation and anime ===
- Abel in Fire Emblem Anime
- Sanji, Koshiro (1st voice) and Inuppe in One Piece
- Sanji in Clockwork Island Adventure, Chopper's Kingdom on the Island of Strange Animals, One Piece The Movie: Dead End no Bōken, One Piece: Norowareta Seiken, Baron Omatsuri and the Secret Island, Giant Mecha Soldier of Karakuri Castle
- Seto Kaiba in Yu-Gi-Oh! Duel Monsters, Yu-Gi-Oh! The Movie: Pyramid of Light
- Daichi Misawa in Yu-Gi-Oh! Duel Monsters GX
- Jin Himuro in Yu-Gi-Oh! 5D's
- Iruka Umino in Naruto, Naruto: Shippuden
- Mizore Fuyukuma in Naruto The Movie: Ninja Clash in the Land of Snow
- Andrew "Bummer" Baumer in Stoked
- Zim in Invader Zim
- Dororo in Keroro Gunso
- Lujon (Episode 35) in Fullmetal Alchemist
- Prince Adam/He-Man in He-Man and the Masters of the Universe
- Haruki Hanai in School Rumble
- Gilliam in Blue Dragon
- Bulkhead in Transformers Animated
- Pete Costas in Max Steel
- Gordon, Norman in Pokémon
- Mr. Blik in Catscratch
- Tom Thomas in Fireman Sam (2004 series)
- Scott Summers/Cyclops in Wolverine and the X-Men
- Icarus in Saint Seiya Heaven Chapter: Overture
- Rockin' Robin in Sugar Sugar Rune
- Sulphur in Jewelpet
- Gaito in Mermaid Melody Pichi Pichi Pitch
- Hayato Shingu in Project ARMS
- Thénardier in Les Misérables: Shōjo Cosette
- Belphegor in Belphegor
- Keiichiro Akasaka in Tokyo Mew Mew
- Aion in Chrono Crusade
- Magna in Spider Riders
- Tora in Dragon Ball Z: Bardock – The Father of Goku
- Misao Yamamura (3rd voice), Shuichi Akai (1st voice), and Gin (2nd voice) in Detective Conan
- Asato Kido in YuYu Hakusho
- Ganryu in Bleach: Memories of Nobody
- Jean Descole in Professor Layton and the Eternal Diva
- Kenshiro in Legend of Raoh: Chapter of Death in Love, Legend of Yuria, Legend of Raoh: Chapter of Fierce Fight, Legend of Toki, Zero: Legend of Kenshiro
- Jubei Kibagami in Ninja Scroll: The Series
- Masahira in Vampire Hunter D: Bloodlust
- Akito Tenkawa in Martian Successor Nadesico: The Motion Picture – Prince of Darkness
- Pepe in Nasu: Summer in Andalusia
- Ollie in T.U.F.F. Puppy
- Galk in Claymore
- Alucard in Hellsing Ultimate
- Jeredy Suno in Monsuno
- Rockin' Robin in Sugar Sugar Rune
- Prince Blueblood in My Little Pony: Friendship Is Magic
- Zurill in Grendizer U

=== Live action films and shows ===
- Shaun in Shaun of the Dead
- Alan Erasmus in 24 Hour Party People
- Sean Linden in Slap Shot 2: Breaking the Ice
- Andy Kasper in The First $20 Million Is Always the Hardest
- Sean McNamara in Nip/Tuck
- Det. Jack Hale in Killer Instinct
- Jonas Rey in Strong Medicine
- Giuseppe Garibaldi in A Casa das Sete Mulheres
- Detective Park Doo-man in Memories of Murder
- Bobby in Joy Ride 2: Dead Ahead
- Steve Addington in Surfer, Dude
- Rufus Zeno in House of Anubis
- Adrian in The Hidden Face
- Mason in The Office
- Captain Feathersword in The Wiggles

=== Video games ===
- Tom Hagen in The Godfather: The Game, The Godfather II
- Joel in The Last of Us, The Last of Us Part II
- Vector in Resident Evil: Operation Raccoon City
- General Wilhelm "Deathshead" Strasse in Wolfenstein (2009 video game)
- Sherlock Holmes in Sherlock Holmes: The Awakened, Sherlock Holmes Versus Arsène Lupin
- James "Sawyer" Ford in Lost: Via Domus
- Hunter in The Legend of Spyro: Dawn of the Dragon
- Liu Kang and Superman in Mortal Kombat vs. DC Universe
- Murgo in Fable II
- Father Gascoigne in Bloodborne
- Vito Scaletta in Mafia II
- Edward Carnby in Alone in the Dark (2008)
- Kyle Crane in Dying Light

=== TV specials ===
- David Copperfield in David Copperfield – L'uomo impossibile (Italian edition of the special The Magic of David Copperfield XVII: The Tornado of Fire)
