= List of Lupo Alberto episodes =

Lupo Alberto (in English Alberto the Wolf), is an Italian animated series produced by The Animation Band in co-production with France 2 for the first season, which was based on the original comic books of the same name. Originally aired in Rai from 1997 to 2002, it was composed of 104 episodes divided into two seasons. Below is the list of episodes.

== Series overview ==
Season	Episodes	Originally released	
Season	Episodes	First released	Last released
1	52	September 3, 1997	1998
2	52	April 15, 2005	2005

== Episodes ==
=== Season 1 (1997–98) ===
No. overall	No. in season	Title	Written by	Storyboard director(s)	Original release date
1	1	"Senza neve che inverno è" "Somewhere in Finland"	?	TBA	September 3, 1997
2	2	"Il pupazzo di neve" "The Snowman"	?	TBA	September 3, 1997
3	3	"L'albero" "The Apple Tree"	?	TBA	April 27, 1997
4	4	"Tra due giorni è Natale" "The 12 Days of Christmas"	?	TBA	May 3, 1997
5	5	"Regalo di Natale"	?	TBA	1998
6	6	"Un minuto a mezzanotte"	?	TBA	1997
7	7	"Fragile"	?	TBA	1997
8	8	"Babysitting"	?	TBA	1997
9	9	"Condominio"	?	TBA	1997
10	10	"L'inquilino del primo piano"	?	TBA	1998
11	11	"Vota Beppe"	?	TBA	1997
12	12	"Sentieri selvaggi"	?	TBA	1998
13	13	"Acqua e fuoco"	?	TBA	1998
14	14	"Il signore delle acque!"	?	TBA	1998
15	15	"Vudù"	?	TBA	1997
16	16	"La parola alla difesa"	?	TBA	1997
17	17	"Il concorso"	?	TBA	1997
18	18	"Bacilli imbecilli"	?	TBA	1997
19	19	"Amore vuol dire gelosia"	?	TBA	1997
20	20	"L'anello"	?	TBA	1997
21	21	"L'infermeria"	?	TBA	1997
22	22	"Una fidanzata per Mosè"	?	TBA	1997
23	23	"La spia spiata"	?	TBA	1997
24	24	"Il giorno del giudizio"	?	TBA	1997
25	25	"Dentista per amore"	?	TBA	1997
26	26	"Ninna nanna"	?	TBA	1998
27	27	"Cappuccetto Rosso"	?	TBA	1998
28	28	"La fattoria moderna"	?	TBA	1997
29	29	"Il contratto"	?	TBA	1998
30	30	"Giovani e belli"	?	TBA	1998
31	31	"Sette in condotta"	?	TBA	1997
32	32	"Pic nic"	?	TBA	1997
33	33	"Il predone del fiume"	?	TBA	1997
34	34	"Lavoro cercasi"	?	TBA	1997
35	35	"Il Corriere del Pollaio"	?	TBA	1997
36	36	"Lupastro nello spazio profondo"	?	TBA	1997
37	37	"Il ritorno"	?	TBA	1997
38	38	"Sottozero"	?	TBA	1998
39	39	"La febbre del videoreporter"	?	TBA	1998
40	40	"Trappole nascoste"	?	TBA	1997
41	41	"Il sostituto di Mosè"	?	TBA	1998
42	42	"La finale"	?	TBA	1997
43	43	"McKenzie Park"	?	TBA	1997
44	44	"Il Grande Occhio"	?	TBA	1997
45	45	"Mekkano"	?	TBA	1997
46	46	"La grande corsa"	?	TBA	1997
47	47	"Vinca il migliore!"	?	TBA	1998
48	48	"Autostrada"	?	TBA	1998
49	49	"Il piatto del giorno"	?	TBA	1998
50	50	"Il gabinetto del dottor La Talpa"	?	TBA	1998
51	51	"La notte degli ortaggi viventi"	?	TBA	1998
52	52	"La prova del fuoco"	?	TBA	1998

=== Season 2 (2005) ===
No. overall	No. in season	Title	English title	Original release date
53	1	"Ingabbiato"	Caged in	April 15, 2005
54	2	"Cercasi rockstar"	Rockstar Wanted	2002
55	3	"Carta bollata"	Official paper	2002
56	4	"Giungla di cemento"	The asphalt jungle	2002
57	5	"Gorgheggi e grida"	Warbles & cries	2002
58	6	"Sussurri e stecche"	Whispers & skeletons	2002
59	7	"Boomerang"	Boomerang	2002
60	8	"Gli spaventapasseri"	The scarecrows	2002
61	9	"Camper"	Camper	2002
62	10	"Il grande Orson"	The great Orson	2002
63	11	"Natale con i fiocchi"	Christmas cheer	2002
64	12	"Lacrime di coccodrillo"	Croccodile tears	2002
65	13	"Torte in faccia"	A pie in the face	2002
66	14	"Il prezzo del successo"	the price of success	2002
67	15	"Un biglietto per la felicità"	A ticket to happiness	2002
68	16	"Nervi scoperti"	Frayed nerves	2002
69	17	"McKenzie day"	McKenzie day	2002
70	18	"Appuntamento al buio"	Blind date	2002
71	19	"Il pranzo di Mosè"	Moses' meal	2002
72	20	"Isteria canina"	Canine hysteria	2002
73	21	"Le Jene"	The hyenas	2002
74	22	"Binari"	Tracks	2002
75	23	"Game over"	Game over	2002
76	24	"Arriva il grande cocomero"	The great watermelon	2002
77	25	"Cuore d'oro"	A heart of gold	2002
78	26	"Vacanze al verde"	Unhappy holiday	2002
79	27	"La rumba del popone"	The melon rhumba	2002
80	28	"Chi ha paura del lupo cattivo?"	Who's afraid of the big bad wolf	2002
81	29	"I temerari"	The fearless ones	2002
82	30	"Selvaggio West"	The wild West	2002
83	31	"Sotto esame"	Exam time	2002
84	32	"Lupastro, anzi, Grassone"	Fuzz face, no, lardo	2002
85	33	"Ultimo spettacolo"	The last show	2002
86	34	"Palloni gonfiati"	Swollen heads	2002
87	35	"Enrico menagramo"	Henry, the jinx	2002
88	36	"Liscio come l'olio"	Smooth as oil	2002
89	37	"Giallo vegetale"	Vegetable mystery	2002
90	38	"Di casa ce n'è una sola"	Home sweet home	2002
91	39	"Soddisfatti e rimborsati"	Satisfied or reimbursed	2002
92	40	"Ciak, si gira!"	Silence, action	2002
93	41	"Il barboncino mannaro"	The werewolf poodle	2002
94	42	"La forza dell'amore"	The force of love	2002
95	43	"Senza trucco, senza inganno"	All above board	2002
96	44	"Al cuor non si comanda"	Headstrong hearts	2002
97	45	"Aria di tempesta"	Stormy weather	2002
98	46	"That's amore"	That's amore	2002
99	47	"Ieri, oggi, domani"	The McKenzie dawn	2002
100	48	"Il topino dei denti"	The tooth fairy	2002
101	49	"Storia di Uccello"	A bird story	2002
Note: This episode is based on a comic novel published in 1978.
102	50	"Questioni di classe"	The make up course	2002
103	51	"La rimpatriata"	The get together	2002
104	52	"Bluff"	Bluff	2002
