= Yurin =

Yurin may refer to:

- Yurin (actress) (ゆりん, born 1981), Japanese actress and voice actress
- Andriy Yurin (born 1984), Ukrainian race walker
- Igor Yurin (born 1982), Kazakh football player
- Olexiy Yurin (born 1982), Ukrainian poet, pedagogue, and interpreter
- Vladimir Yurin (1947–2016), Soviet and Russian footballer and coach

== See also ==
- Konon Berman-Yurin (1901–1936), Latvian communist
