= Chiaki Yurin =

Japanese actress and voice actress

- ユリン千晶
- Born: Chiaki Naitou; 18 June 1981 (age 45); Kure, Hiroshima, Japan
- Occupations: Voice actress, actress
- Years active: 2003–present
- Agent: Aoni Production
- Website: yurinstyle.com

Chiaki Naitou (内藤 千晶, Naitou Chiaki; born 18 June 1981), known better by her stage name Chiaki Yurin (ユリン千晶, Yurin Chiaki) and previously known as Yurin (ゆりん), is a Japanese voice actress and actress. She is a native of Kure, Hiroshima Prefecture.

== Filmography ==
=== Anime ===
- Bokura ga Ita (2006), Nana Yamamoto
- Kekkaishi (2006), girl (Episode 49), Kirara Kawagami, student (Episode 21)
- Sugarbunnies (2007), Strawberry Usa
- Yatterman (2008), Potaru Kuroimo (Episode 4)
- Real Drive (2008), Risa Shimizu (Episode 8)
- Hell Girl: Three Vessels (2008), Yume Kiuchi (Episode 18: Special Radio)
- Inuyasha: The Final Act (2009), Hide
- Yumeiro Patissiere (2009), Mother (Episode 32)
- Kimi ni Todoke (2009), Chigusa Takano, Hitomi
- K-ON!! (2010), First year student (Episode 10)
- Kimi ni Todoke 2nd Season (2011), Chigusa Takahashi (5 episodes), Hitomi (Episode 12)
- Suite PreCure (2011), Female Student 3 (Episode 15), Female Student A (Episode 14), Girl (Episode 10), Rena (Episode 2), Small Sister (Episode 6), Sweets Club Member
- Inazuma Eleven GO! (2011), Yamana Akane, Kousaka Yukie
- Tamagotchi! (2012), Knighttchi
- Space Dandy (2014), Honey
- Akiba Maid War (2022), Red Supernova Manami

=== Video Games ===
- Conception as Mana
- Max Anarchy as Eileen
- Ring☆Dream Women's Pro Wrestling War as Sujata, Kankichi Isobe, Mercury Care
- The Idolmaster Cinderella Girls as Cineria/Ayane Suzuki

=== Drama CD ===
- The Idolmaster Innocent Blue for Dearly Stars (2011), Cineria/Ayane Suzuki

=== Overseas Dubbing ===
- Hyper Bots as Honey
- Super Robot Monkey Team Hyperforce Go! as Jinmay
