= Blow Hot, Blow Cold =

1969 film

- Directed by: Florestano Vancini
- Written by: Florestano Valpini; Massimo Felisatti; Fabio Pittorru
- Starring: Giuliano Gemma; Rosemary Dexter
- Cinematography: Ennio Guarnieri
- Edited by: Mario Morra
- Music by: Carlo Rustichelli
- Release date: 1969
- Language: Italian

Blow Hot, Blow Cold (Italian: Violenza al sole, also known as The Island) is a 1969 Italian thriller-drama film directed by Florestano Vancini.

== Plot ==
A complex love story in the setting of a summer holiday in the beautiful islands off the coast of Puglia (Italy). Here we find two couples: an irregular but happy Italian pair of youths, and the other Swedish, more mature and legal. Gunnar Lindmark is a professor of psychology, while his wife Meret finds here a reminiscence of an old extramarital love, which ceased because of her lover's death. This crisis triggers jealousy in the professor, who kills the Italian guy.

== Cast ==
- Giuliano Gemma as Giulio
- Rosemary Dexter as Letizia, lover of Giulio
- Gunnar Björnstrand as Gunnar Lindmark
- Bibi Andersson as Meret, wife of Gunnar
- Amos Davoli as The Judge
- Brizio Montinaro as The Barman
- Saverio Moriones as Monk
