= Rigotti =

Rigotti is an Italian surname. Notable people with the surname include:

- Alessandro Rigotti (born 1978), Italian voice actor
- Annibale Rigotti (1870-1968), Italian architect
- Carlo Rigotti (1906-1983), Italian football player
- Hans Rigotti (born 1947), German football player
