= Benedetta Ponticelli =

Italian voice actress

- Occupation: Voice actor

Benedetta Ponticelli is an Italian voice actress. She contributes to voicing characters in anime, cartoons, sitcoms, films, video games, and more content.

Ponticelli provides the voice of Carly Shay in the Italian-language version of Nickelodeon original sitcom iCarly. She also voiced Tenma Tsukomato in the anime series School Rumble. In addition, she does Applejack and Fluttershy in My Little Pony: Friendship Is Magic. Also, she is the new Italian voice of Lara Croft.

Ponticelli works at Merak Film, Studio P.V., Studio Asci and other dubbing studios in Italy.

== Voice work ==
=== Video games ===
- Sylvie Leroux in Chronicles of Mystery: The Scorpio Ritual
- Cristina Vespucci in Assassin's Creed II and Assassin's Creed: Brotherhood
- Lara Croft in Tomb Raider, Rise of the Tomb Raider, Shadow of the Tomb Raider
- Miles "Tails" Prower since Sonic Generations
- Leah in Diablo III

=== Anime and animation ===
- Tenma Tsukomato in School Rumble
- Alphonse Elric in Fullmetal Alchemist, Fullmetal Alchemist the Movie: Conqueror of Shamballa and Fullmetal Alchemist: Brotherhood
- Jimmy Neutron in The Adventures of Jimmy Neutron: Boy Genius
- Nick in The Cat in the Hat Knows a Lot About That!
- Island Owl in Animal Mechanicals
- Yuki Cross in Vampire Knight and Vampire Knight Guilty
- Urié in Angel's Friends
- Applejack and Fluttershy in My Little Pony: Friendship Is Magic
- Reiha in Vampire Princess Miyu
- Aramis in The Three Musketeers (1987 TV series), Aria the Animation, Aria the Natural, Aria the Origination
- Issa in Animal Yokochō
- Ilse Burnley in Kaze no Shoujo Emily
- Loki (child form) in The Mythical Detective Loki Ragnarok
- Doris in Terkel in Trouble
- Magma in X-Men: Evolution
- Aya Hasebe in Comic Party
- Alison in Cosmic Quantum Ray
- Biff Robinson in The Magic Key
- Ondino in Ondino
- Roary in Roary the Racing Car
- Dear Daniel in The Adventures of Hello Kitty & Friends
- Uta Yumeno in Onegai My Melody
- Inori Yamabuki/Cure Pine in Fresh Pretty Cure!
- May Jessica in Sol Bianca: The Legacy
- Lady Clarisse d'Cagliostro in The Castle of Cagliostro (3rd dub)
- Valentine de Villefort in Gankutsuou: The Count of Monte Cristo
- Anna Aoi/Anna Saruwatari in Godannar
- Anna Rochefort in Le Chevalier D'Eon
- Tio in Fushigiboshi no Futagohime
- Ellie Martin/Elastika in Zevo-3
- Snap in ChalkZone
- Lara Croft in Tomb Raider: The Legend of Lara Croft

=== Live action ===
- Carly Shay in iCarly
- Rose Hall-Smith in McLeod's Daughters
- Eva in Frontier(s)
- Tammi in Thief
- Callie in True Jackson, VP
- Hotarubi in Shinobi: Heart Under Blade
- Mieke Fonkel/Mega Mindy in Mega Mindy
- Emily Kmetko in Make It or Break It
- Greta King in The Office
- Miles "Tails" Prower in Sonic the Hedgehog 2
