= Justin Urquhart Stewart =

British investment manager and commentator (born 1955)

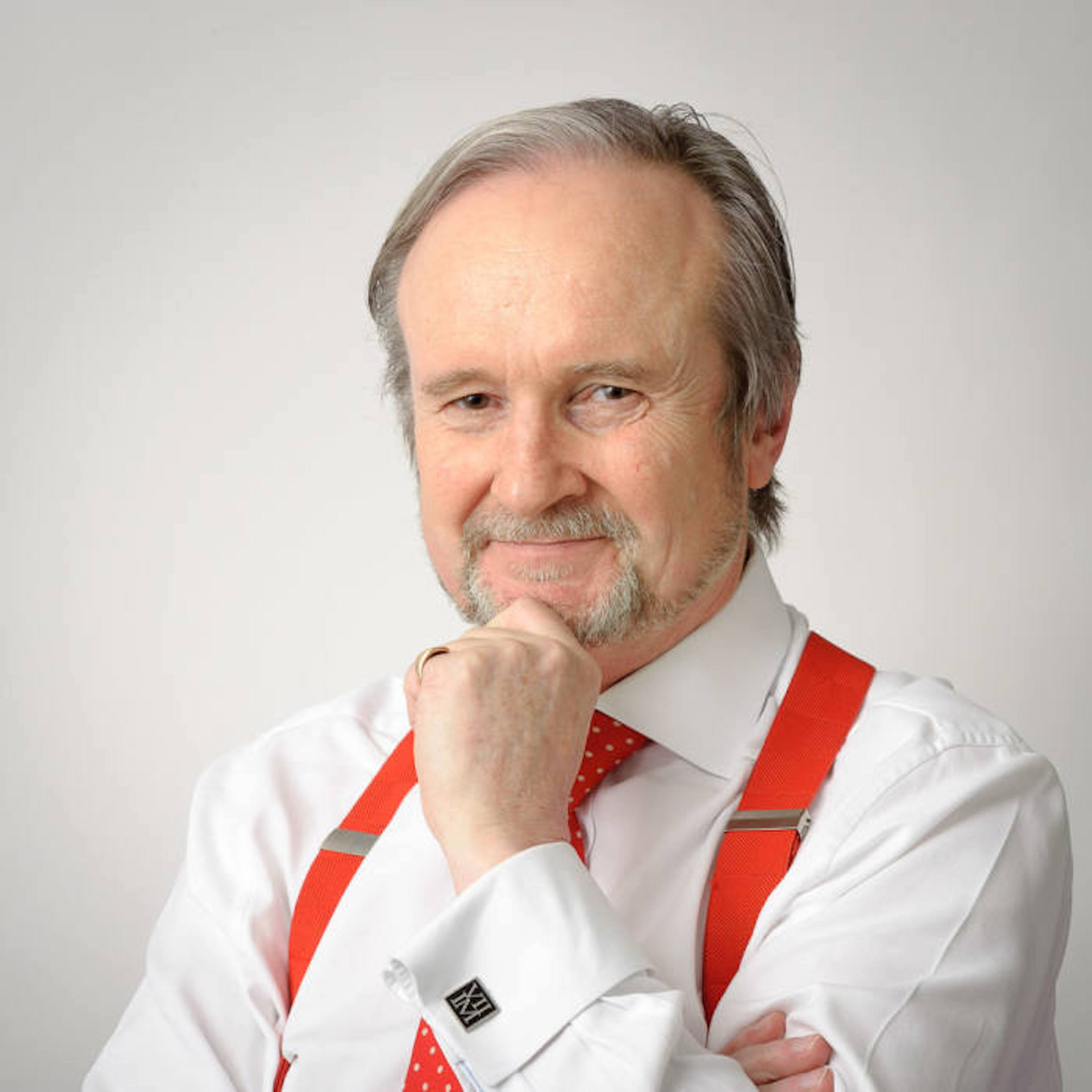
- Born: January 1955 (age 71); England
- Education: University of Southampton
- Occupation: Investment manager
- Spouses: Francesca (died): Virginia Blackburn
- Children: 1

Justin Alun Urquhart Stewart (born January 1955) is a British investment manager and business commentator who was the co-founder and Head of Corporate Development at the investment fund 7IM. Urquhart Stewart founded Regionally in 2020. He is also known for appearing on British television wearing his trademark red braces.

== Early life and education ==
Urquhart Stewart was born in England but raised in Scotland before returning south to be educated at Bryanston School. Urquhart Stewart graduated from the University of Southampton.

== Career ==
=== Business ===
The logo used for Seven Investment Management

Prior to working in the investment industry, Urquhart Stewart had worked in a Vineyard in Europe and the Dockyards in Southampton (where he was a shop steward for UCATT (Union of Construction, Allied Trades and Technicians)) before studying in Law at the University of Southampton. He went onto train as a Barrister with the Council of Legal Education. He left a short career in Law and started his finance career in 1978 with Barclays Bank International in Uganda. He eventually moved to Singapore with Barclays in 1980 before returning to the UK in 1983 as Sovereign Lending manager. He left Barclays in 1986 to set up Broker Services which was eventually taken over by Barclays (becoming Barclays Stockbrokers) and went on to hold various other Director positions with Barclays subsidies. While at Barclays he helped set up the Alternative Investment Market in 1995 and assisted with creating ProShare in 1992. In 2000 he left Barclays to co-found Seven Investment management (7IM) with fellow Barclays stockbroker Tom Sheridan. In 2016, he helped launch Investors in Community, a charity that is a peer to peer platform to bring business and charity together.

In 2020 Urquhart Stewart co-founded Regionally, a bespoke investment facilitator to promote regional growth investments within the UK, targeted at professional investors.

=== Media ===
Urquhart Stewart started commentating on business matters in the 1980s, however it was not until the 1990s that he became a regular commentator and writer and has been described as a go to guy by many news outlets. He became a regular guest on BBC programmes Working Lunch (where he was on the final show in 2010); Wake Up to Money; Today; The One Show and BBC Breakfast and a regular contributor to the Business News website. He has made regular commentator appearances on ITV News; GMTV; Daybreak and Good Morning Britain. He is also a business commentator for Sky News; CNN; PRI; CBS News; ABC News; Reuters and has discussed Business with Zig and Zag on Channel 4's The Big Breakfast. He had a regular radio show on LBC and has been a regular guest on Talkradio.

He has been a contributor and writer for a number of newspapers and magazines including The Times; The Financial Times; FT Adviser; The Independent; The Spectator; The Telegraph; Bloomberg Businessweek; The Guardian; Wprost; The Observer; Evening Standard; The New York Times, and local press.

== Personal life ==
He was married to Francesca, an upholstery teacher until her death in March 2019, and has a daughter, Tiwi. His second wife is the journalist and author Virginia Blackburn. He has appeared as an extra in Sharpe. Stewart rides classic motorbikes and drives a Morris Minor Traveller. One of his passions is archaeology. He has been honoured by his former university by the naming of the Justin Urquhart Stewart award, a bursary available to second-year business school students. He was awarded an honorary doctorate by the university in 2018.
