= Lella Costa =

Italian actress

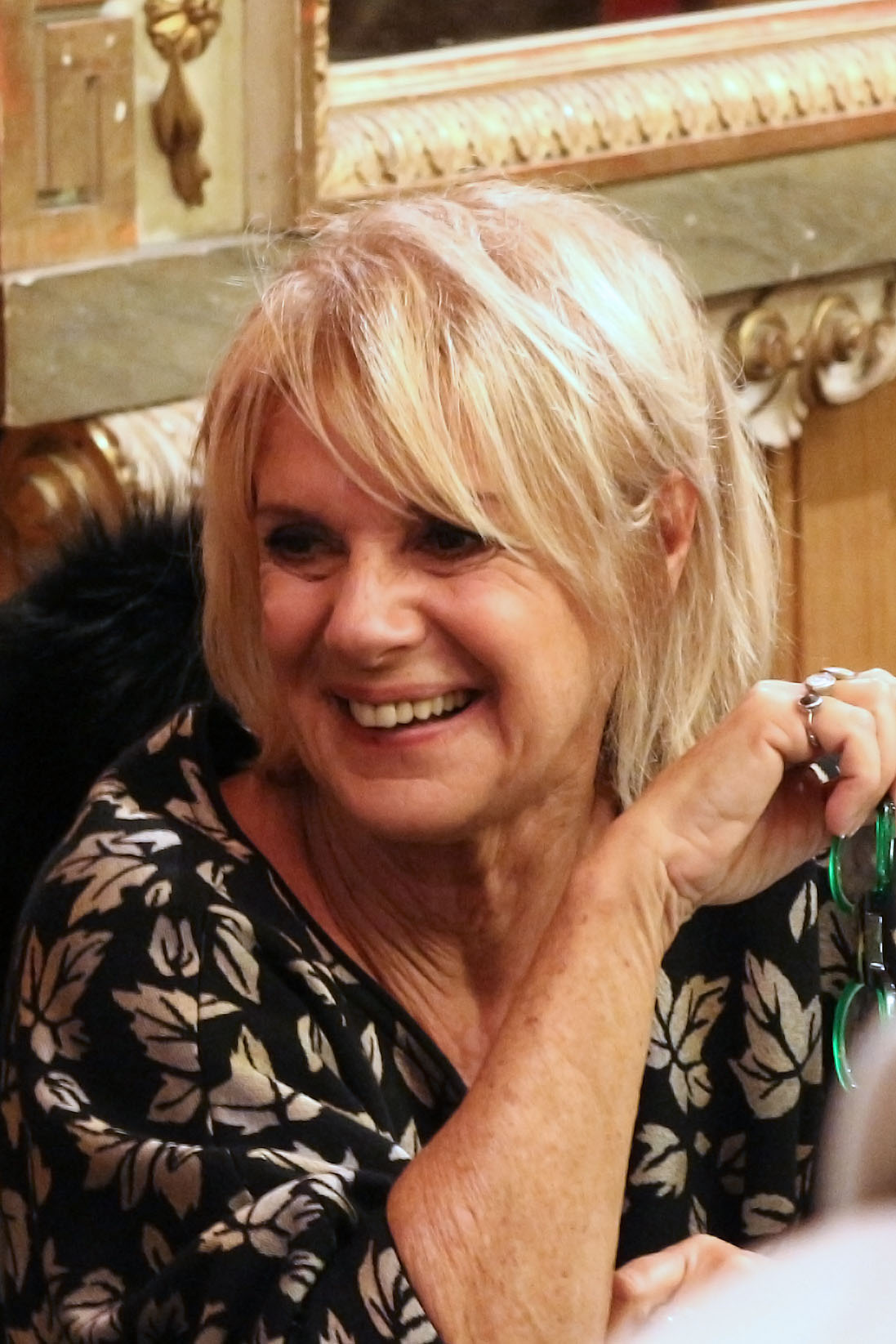
- Costa in 2014
- Born: Gabriella Costa; 30 September 1952 (age 73); Milan, Italy

Gabriella "Lella" Costa (born 30 September 1952) is an Italian actress, comedian, playwright and writer.

== Life and career ==
Born in Milan, Costa studied acting at the Accademia dei Filodrammatici, and made her professional debut in the 1970s, with the stage company of Massimo De Rossi. In 1980, she had her breakout with the a theatrical monologue Repertorio, cioè l'orfana e il reggicalze, written by Stella Leonetti, and soon specialized in the monologue genre.

In 1987, Costa made her playwriting debut with the satirical monologue Adlib. Her 1996 monologue Stanca di guerra was co-written with Alessandro Baricco. Starting from the second half of the 1980s, she started appearing in several television comedy shows. She also appeared in several films, mostly in character roles, notably in Maurizio Nichetti's The Icicle Thief. She is also active as a voice actress and a dubber.

Since 2021, Costa serves as artistic director of the Teatro Carcano alongside Serena Sinigaglia.
