= Simone D'Andrea =

Italian voice actor

- Born: November 20, 1973 (age 51); Milan, Italy
- Occupation: Voice actor
- Spouse: Cristiana Rossi
- Children: 2

Simone D'Andrea (born November 20, 1973) is an Italian voice actor.

== Biography ==
D'Andrea contributes to voicing characters in anime, cartoons, movies, video games and other content. For example, he is well known for providing the voice of James in the Italian-language version of the ongoing anime series Pokémon. He also provided the voice of Itachi Uchiha in the Italian-language versions of Naruto and Naruto: Shippuden.

He works at Merak Film and other dubbing studios in Italy.

== Voice work ==
=== Animation ===
- Radames in Aida degli alberi

=== Dubbing ===
==== Animation ====
- James in Pokémon
- Julian in Fire Emblem
- Katsuya Jonouchi in Yu-Gi-Oh! Duel Monsters
- Aster Phoenix, Harrington Rosewood, and Belowski in Yu-Gi-Oh! GX
- Hunter Pace and Kalin Kessler in Yu-Gi-Oh! 5D's
- Caleb in W.I.T.C.H.
- Trunks in Dragon Ball Z, Dragon Ball GT
- Reef in Stoked
- Hiroto Kazama in Kilari
- Yoh Asakura in Shaman King
- Kaito Dōmoto in Mermaid Melody Pichi Pichi Pitch
- Yoshio in Fancy Lala
- Sulfus in Angel's Friends
- Itachi Uchiha in Naruto
- Arthur Read in Arthur
- Tyson Granger in Beyblade, Beyblade V-Force, Beyblade G-Revolution
- Kyoya Tategami in Beyblade: Metal Fusion, Beyblade: Metal Masters, Beyblade: Metal Fury
- Wally West in Justice League and Justice League Unlimited
- Masquerade in Bakugan Battle Brawlers
- Oswald "Otto" Rocket in Rocket Power
- Kevin Thompson in Daria
- Keigo Taitou in Jewelpet
- Jiro in Blue Dragon, Blue Dragon: Tenkai no Shichi Ryū
- Nozomu Kanō/Kanon in Nurse Angel Ririka SOS
- Li'l Pea in VeggieTales
- Fuyuki Hinata in Keroro Gunso
- Toya Kinomoto in Cardcaptor Sakura
- Thatch in Casper's Scare School
- Kirikaze in Fūma no Kojirō
- Naoki Shinjyo in Future GPX Cyber Formula
- Heiji Hattori in Detective Conan
- Terkel in Terkel in Trouble
- Chichiri in Fushigi Yûgi
- Sasuke/Zazo in Mirmo!
- Knight Valentine in Godannar
- Dr. Chaplin in Teenage Mutant Ninja Turtles
- Ren Honjo in Nana
- Takefumi Tonami in His and Her Circumstances
- Bamm-Bamm Rubble in The Flintstones (Second dub)
- Jack Ryder in Odd Job Jack
- Sousuke Sagara in Full Metal Panic!
- Vinnie in Biker Mice from Mars
- Kong in Kong: The Animated Series
- Mullin Shetland in Last Exile
- Kamui Shirō in X
- Archie Andrews in Archie's Weird Mysteries
- Rick Jones in The Incredible Hulk
- Mark "Charger" McCutchen in NASCAR Racers
- Kazuya Yanagiba in Wedding Peach
- Kōichi Mizuno in Tonde Burin
- Rigaldo in Claymore
- Dalton (Third voice), Kabaji (Second voice), Paulie, Emporio Ivankov, Duval, and Sham in One Piece
- Ratchet in Giant Mecha Soldier of Karakuri Castle
- Saule in Sugar Sugar Rune
- Generic Man in ChalkZone

==== Live action ====
- General Hux in Star Wars: Episode VII – The Force Awakens, Star Wars: Episode VIII – The Last Jedi, Star Wars: Episode IX – The Rise of Skywalker
- Brandon Turner in Dr. Dolittle Million Dollar Mutts
- James Clayton in The Recruit
- Ben Murphy in License to Wed
- Jerry Dandrige in Fright Night
- Dylan Dog in Dylan Dog: Dead of Night
- Dusty Mayron in Daddy's Home, Daddy's Home 2
- Superman in Superman Returns
- Lyle/The Napster in The Italian Job
- Alex in Frontier(s)
- Martin Luther in Luther
- Arthur Després in Le Plus Beau Jour de ma vie
- Gene Carson in Flightplan
- Guy Malyon in Head in the Clouds
- Jonathan Preest in Franklyn
- Assi in Lebanon (2009 film)
- Joe Willis in Brothers
- Jake Taylor in Cursed
- Peter Hook in Control
- Styles McFee in National Lampoon Presents Dorm Daze
- Martin "Ickarus" Karow in Berlin Calling
- James Trademore in Kamen Rider: Dragon Knight
- Nicolas in Shall We Kiss?
- Christian Thompson in The Devil Wears Prada
- James Reese in From Paris with Love
- Blaine Rawlings in Flyboys
- Isacc in Day of the Dead 2: Contagium
- Buddy Slade in Young Adult
- The Messiah in Kaboom
- Marc Silverman, Kevin Callis, and Caesar in Lost
- Charlie Kramer in Masters of Science Fiction
- Nick Fallin in The Guardian
- Scott in Higher Ground
- Jack Porter in Watch Over Me
- Cool Clarky in The Wiggles
- Sasan in So NoTORIous
- Leslie St. Claire in Charmed
- Arnie Swenton in The Cleaner
- Devjeet "Dave" Mohumbhai in Flight of the Conchords
- Jerry Henson in Angela's Eyes
- Bobby Long in Zack and Miri Make a Porno
- Louis Connelly in August Rush
- Henry Barthes in Detachment
- Marc Marronnier in L'amour dure trois ans

==== Video games ====
- Ratchet in Ratchet & Clank
- Martin Holan in Nibiru: Age of Secrets
- Masquerade in Bakugan Battle Brawlers
