= Tony Fuochi =

Italian voice actor (1955–2022)

Antonio Luigi Fuochi (25 April 1955 – 14 February 2022), better known as Tony Fuochi, was an Italian voice actor.

== Biography ==
Active from the late 1980s until 2014, he voiced multiple characters from cartoons and video games including Mario.

Fuochi was hospitalized on 12 January with COVID-19 amid the COVID-19 pandemic in Italy. After more than a month spent in intensive care, he died in Padua on 14 February 2022, at the age of 66.
