= Sugarbunnies =

Franchise by Sanrio

Shirousa and Kurousa
- Sanrio character
- First appearance: 2004
- Last appearance: present
- Created by: Kazumi Fukasawa
- Voiced by: Yui Horie (Shirousa); Akiko Kimura (Kurousa)

In-universe information
- Nickname: Sugarbunnies
- Species: Rabbit
- Gender: Male
- Occupation: Pâtisserie

Sugarbunnies (シュガーバニーズ, Shugābanīzu) is a character line created by Sanrio in 2004, with character designs done by Kazumi Fukasawa. The main characters are Shirousa and Kurousa, twin bunnies who live in a magical world of Bunniesfield, who are genius patissiere specialize in making sweets and pastries.

The character line also has a spin-off called Sugarminuet (シュガーメヌエット, Shugāmenuetto), which debuted in 2008, consisting of Balletusa and Primausa, the twin bunnies who are talented ballerinas.

== Story ==
Sugarbunnies are a pair of twin bunnies who live in Bunniesfield, a magical world filled with pairs of nature and where all twin bunnies live. They have their specialities that became maestro.

== Characters ==
=== Sugarbunnies ===
Shirousa (しろうさ, Shirousa)
Voiced by: Yui Horie
Shirousa (born May 26) is a white bunny with a pink bowtie, and is Kurousa's older twin brother. He is a pâtissier who is specialized in making pastries and cakes made with cream and fruit. He is always full of energy and leads his twin brother Kurousa. Like Kurousa, his catchphrase is "We'll surely succeed" (きっとうまくいくよ, Kitto umaku iku yo).
Kurousa (くろうさ, Kurousa)
Voiced by: Akiko Kimura
Kurousa (born May 26) is a brown bunny with thick eyebrows, and is Shirousa's younger twin brother. He is a pâtissier who is specialized in making pastries, chocolate-flavored sweets, and baked goods. He is kind and laid-back, and is always worried about his twin brother Shirousa. Like Shirousa, his catchphrase is "We'll surely succeed" (きっとうまくいくよ, Kitto umaku iku yo), like his twin brother.
Momousa (ももうさ, Momousa)
Voiced by: Yukari Tamura
Momousa (born March 3) is a pink bunny with a pink ribbon next to her right ear, and is Hanausa's older twin sister. She is a florist who is specialized in planting and flower arrangement. She is described as everyone's fashion leader, having an amazing sense of style and arranging clothing.
Hanausa (はなうさ, Hanausa)
Voiced by: Yukari Tamura
Hanausa (born March 3) is a light yellow bunny with flowers next to her left ear, and is Momousa's younger twin sister. She is a florist who is specialized in planting and growing flowers. She has a love for flowers and is very close to them. Even when they're wilted, she will quickly make them vibrant again.
Blueberryusa (ブルーベリーうさ, Burūberiusa)
Voiced by: Yuki Masuda
Blueberryusa (born February 6) is a light bluish-purple bunny with blueberries next to her left ear, and is Strawberryusa's younger twin sister. She is a jammaker who is specialized in making jam and cooking. She loves to throw parties.
Strawberryusa (ストロベリーうさ, Sutoroberīusa)
Voiced by: Yurin
Strawberryusa (born February 6) is a pink bunny with a strawberry next to her left ear, and is Blueberryusa's older twin sister. She is a jammaker who is specialized in making jam and growing fruits. She grows lots of fruit trees in her garden.
Buchiusa (ぶちうさ, Buchiusa)
Voiced by: Kana Ueda
Buchiusa (born August 1) is a white bunny with gray spots, and is Mintusa's younger twin brother. He is a gelatiere who is specialized in making gelato. He is described a fun prankster.
Mintusa (ミントうさ, Mintousa)
Voiced by: Yuki Masuda
Mintusa (born August 1) is a mint green bunny, and is Buchiusa's older twin brother. He is a gelatiere who is specialized in making gelato. He is a bit of a glutton and loves Shirousa and Kurousa's cakes.
Aousa (あおうさ, Aousa)
Voiced by: Yurin
Aousa (born December 13) is a blue bunny, and is Aomimiusa's older twin brother. He is a terrier who is specialized in making glass and hard candy. He is a little particular, but very knowledgeable.
Aomimiusa (あおみみうさ, Aomimiusa)
Voiced by: Kenji Hamada
Aomimiusa (born December 13) is a white bunny with cyan inner ears, and is Aousa's younger twin brother. He is a terrier who is specialized in making glass and hard candy. He is unassuming and has a calming effect on anyone.
Latteusa (ラテうさ, Rateusa)
Voiced by: Yoshinori Fujita
Latteusa (born April 3) is a beige bunny with freckles, and is Cappucchinousa's older twin brother. He is a barista who is specialized in making coffee. He is very social and loves talking to the customers.
Cappuccinousa (カプチーノうさ, Kapuchīnousa)
Voiced by: Yuko Sasamoto
Cappuccinousa (born April 3) is a brown bunny, and is Latteusa's younger twin brother. He is a barista who is specialized in making coffee. He usually raises up his ears when he is busy.
Komugiusa (こむぎうさ, Komugiusa)
Voiced by: Yumi Kakazu
Komugiusa (born October 10) is a tan bunny and is Pandausa's younger twin brother. He is a boulanger who is specialize in baking bread. He is good at playing sports.
Pandausa (ぱんだうさ, Pandausa)
Voiced by: Takeharu Onishi
Pandausa is a black and white bunny, resembling a panda, and is Komugiusa's older twin brother. He is a boulanger who is specialize in baking bread. He loves to make everyone laugh.

=== Others ===
Balletusa (バレエうさ, Bareeusa)
Balletusa (born November 17) is a pink bunny with light purple inner ears and a silver tiara with white feathers, and is Primausa's older twin sister. She is a ballerina who is specialized at the Swan Dance. She also loves makeup.
Primausa (プリマうさ, Purimausa)
Primausa (born November 17) is a white bunny with a gold tiara with a pink rose, and is Balletusa's younger twin sister. She is a ballerina who is specialized at the Fairy Dance. Her hobby is fortune telling.
Cacao (カカオ, Kakao)
Cacao is a mint green mouse with a brown bunny hat, and is Vanilla's older twin brother. He and his sister live in Mousefields, located next of Bunniesfield. The two decided to visit Bunniesfield one day through a rainbow and met Shirousa and Kurousa. The mouse siblings so liked the sweets, chocolates and pastries the bunnies make they wanted the bunnies to teach them to become chocolatiers. The bunnies agreed and made the mouse siblings their apprentices. Their ultimate goal is to make a castle made of chocolate.
Vanilla (バニラ, Banira)
Vanilla is a pink mouse with a white bunny hat, and is Cacao's younger twin sister. She and her brother live in Mousefields, located next of Bunniesfield. The two decided to visit Bunniesfield one day through a rainbow and met Shirousa and Kurousa. The mouse siblings so liked the sweets, chocolates and pastries the bunnies make they wanted the bunnies to teach them to become chocolatiers. The bunnies agreed and made the mouse siblings their apprentices. Their ultimate goal is to make a castle made of chocolate.

== Media ==
=== Anime ===
- Sugarbunnies
- Volume 1 DVD cover of the first series, showing all 14 Sugarbunnies plus Sophia

シュガーバニーズ (Shugābanīzu)
- Anime television series
- Directed by: Hiroshi Kugimiya
- Written by: Chinatsu Hojo; Yoshio Urasawa
- Studio: Asahi Production
- Original network: TV Tokyo
- Original run: April 3, 2007 – September 25, 2007
- Episodes: 27
- Anime television series

Sugarbunnies: Chocolat!
- Directed by: Hiroshi Kugimiya
- Written by: Yoshio Urasawa
- Studio: Asahi Production
- Original network: TV Tokyo
- Original run: April 1, 2008 – September 23, 2008
- Episodes: 27
- Anime television series

Sugarbunnies: Fleur
- Directed by: Hiroshi Kugimiya
- Written by: Yumi Kageyama
- Studio: Asahi Production
- Original network: TV Tokyo
- Original run: April 7, 2009 – September 29, 2009
- Episodes: 27
- Manga

Together Sugarbunnies
- Written by: Shiori Kanaki
- Published by: Shogakukan
- Imprint: Ladybug Comics Special
- Magazine: Pucchigumi
- Original run: 2007 – present
- Volumes: 1

The character line was adopted into short anime television series that aired as part of the Kitty's Paradise Plus variety program on TV Tokyo from April 3 to September 25, 2007. It was followed by a sequel titled Sugarbunnies: Chocolat!, which aired from April 1 to September 23, 2008, and then followed by Sugarbunnies: Fleur, which aired from April 7 to September 29, 2009.

==== Story ====
One day, 14 bunnies were transported from their home world of Bunniesfield to the human world in order to complete a task assigned to them by the Two Queens. As they arrive, they meet and befriend Sophia, a human girl who dreams of being the best pastry chef in all of Europe. Although Sophia keeps the bunnies hidden from everyone in town, even her parents, their cover is blown when the whole town finds out they are real. Together, they make delicious foods with the Sugarbunnies each making their own special treats.

==== Characters ====
Sophia Cherbourg (ソフィア・シェルブール, Sofia Sherubūru)
Voiced by: Kana Ueda
The main protagonist of the anime series. Sophia is a young girl from France who dreams on becoming the best pâtisserie when she grows up. She first met both Shirousa and Kurousa and befriended them, both teaching her how to bake. Later on, she finds and befriends the other Sugarbunnies. She lives on a house just above their family bookshop.
Françoise Dupont (フランソワーズ・デュポーン, Furansowāzu Dyupōn)
Voiced by: Yuko Sasamoto
One of Sophia's close friends, she's born from a prestigious rich family and also has a dream on becoming the best pastry chief just like Sophia. She's also one of the people who knew of the existence of the Sugarbunnies after they found out they were real. She later becomes Momousa, Hanausa, Strawberryusa, and Blueberryusa's partner.
Pierre Jeunet (ピエール・ジュネ, Piēru June)
Voiced by: Yuki Masuda
Pierre is also one of Sophia's close friends and an expert biker, who sometimes goes on tours all across Europe. He's also one of the people who knew the existence of the Sugarbunnies after they found out they were real. He later becomes Latteusa, Cappuchinousa, Komugiusa, and Pandausa's partner.
Maroon Debuchy (マルーヌ・デブシャン, Marune Debushan)
Voiced by: Kikumi Umeda
A friend of Sophia. He is a large boy who likes sweets. When he first sees the Sugarbunnies move, he isn't completely convinced they're alive, but eventually finds out they are real. He later becomes Buchiusa, Mintusa, Aousa, and Aomimiusa's partner.
Rosary Cherbourg (ロザリー・シェルブール, Rozarī Sherubūru)
Voiced by: Yuki Masuda
Sophia's mother and the wife of Bernard, who works as an illustrator for various storybooks. She's also one of the people who knew of the existence of the Sugarbunnies after they found out they were real.
Bernard Cherbourg (ベルナール・シェルブール, Berunāru Sherubūru)
Voiced by: Kenji Hamada
Sophia's father and the owner of the family bookshop, he's one of the people who knew of the existence of the Sugarbunnies after they found out they were real.
Mireille Darie (ミレーユ・ダリエ, Mirēyu Darie)
Voiced by: Yumi Kakazu
She's also one of Sophia's close friends and also one of the people who knew of the existence of the Sugarbunnies after they found out they were real.
Charlotte Ferrer (シャルロット・フェレール, Sharurotto Ferēru)
Voiced by: Yukari Tamura
Charlotte is a young girl who dreams to be the best ballerina and perform along with her parents, but she has problems with her dancing. In Sugarbunnies: Chocolat!, she found out about the Sugarbunnies and befriended them while teaching them how to dance gracefully.
Nicolas Delvaux (ニコラ・デルヴォー, Nikora Deruvō)
Voiced by: Marina Inoue
Nicolas is a young boy from Belgium who appears in Chocolat!. He is currently training to become a chocolatier.
Liddy Aime (リディ・エーメ, Ridi Ēme)
Voiced by: Ami Koshimizu
Liddy is a shy girl from the Alps who appears in Fleur. Her father manages Françoise's flower villa.

=== Manga ===
The character line was adopted into a manga adaptation titled Together Sugarbunnies (いっしょにシュガーバニーズ, Issho ni shugābanīzu). Illustrated by Shiori Kanaki, it is published by Shogakukan, serialized in the Ladybug Comics Special label.
