= List of Tottoko Hamutaro Hai! episodes =

Tottoko Hamutaro Haai! (とっとこハム太郎は〜い!, Tottoko Hamutarō Hai!) is the sequel to 'Tottoko Hamutaro: Hamu Hamu Paradichu!. The series revolves around the 15 original Ham-Hams in short 5-minute episodes. The Hai! series is animated differently from the original series, most notably, the head-to-body ratio is off, and it is also computer-generated in 3-D. It has never been aired in English, but has aired in Italian under the title of Hi! Hamtaro: Piccoli Criceti Grandi Avventure, in Mandarin under the same name as the original series, Hamutailang (Hamtaro), as well as in Thai and Korean, and in Indonesian under "Hi! Hamtaro: Little Hamsters, Big Adventures (its official English name) . There is a video game called Tottoko Hamutaro Hai!: Hamu Hamu Challenge! Atsumare Hai! in allusion to the series, which is called "Hi! Hamtaro: Ham-Ham Challenge" in English to reflect the show's official English name.

== List of episodes ==
No.	Title	Original release date
1	"My Name is Hamtaro"; Transliteration: "Boku Hamutarō na no da" (Japanese: ぼくハム太郎なのだ)	April 5, 2006
Hamtaro helps Oxnard find lost seeds.
2	"Playing with Bijou"; Transliteration: "Ribon-chan to Asobu no da" (Japanese: リボンちゃんと遊ぶのだ)	April 12, 2006
Bijou needs to prepare herself to play with Hamtaro and Oxnard, making the two wait and entertain themselves until she's done.
3	"Boss and the Game"; Transliteration: "Taishō-kun to Shōbu na no da" (Japanese: タイショーくんと勝負なのだ)	April 19, 2006
Hamtaro and Boss have a speed race down a hill.
4	"Howdy and Dexter"; Transliteration: "Maido-kun to Megane-kun na no da" (Japanese: まいどくんとめがねくんなのだ)	April 26, 2006
A job at cleaning results in Howdy and Dexter getting into a big fight.
5	"Pashmina and Penelope"; Transliteration: "Mafurā-chan to Chibi Maru-chan na no da" (Japanese: マフラーちゃんとちび丸ちゃんなのだ)	May 3, 2006
Penelope wants a fish kite, so Hamtaro and Pashmina try to think of a way to give her one.
6	"Maxwell Really Likes Books"; Transliteration: "Hon ga Daisuki Noppo-kun na no da" (Japanese: 本が大好きのっぽくんなのだ)	May 10, 2006
Maxwell reads to the Ham-Hams.
7	"Stan and Sandy"; Transliteration: "Torahamu-kun to Torahamu-chan na no da" (Japanese: トラハムくんとトラハムちゃんなのだ)	May 17, 2006
.
8	"Hide-and-Seek with Cappy"; Transliteration: "Kaburu-kun to Kakurenbo na no da" (Japanese: かぶるくんとかくれんぼなのだ)	May 24, 2006
Cappy plays hide-and-seek with the Ham-Hams.
9	"Panda Can Make Anything"; Transliteration: "Nandemo Tsukuru yo Panda-kun na no da" (Japanese: なんでもつくるよパンダくんなのだ)	May 31, 2006
Panda builds a playground.
10	"Wandering Traveler Jingle"; Transliteration: "Sasurai no Tabibito Tongari-kun na no da" (Japanese: さすらいのたびびとトンガリくんなのだ)	June 7, 2006
.
11	"Let's Sleep a Lot Like Snoozer"; Transliteration: "Zutto Neteru yo Neteru-kun na no da" (Japanese: ずっとねてるよねてるくんなのだ)	June 14, 2006
.
12	"Fun on a Rainy Day"; Transliteration: "Ame no Hi wa Tanoshī no da" (Japanese: 雨の日は楽しいのだ)	June 21, 2006
.
13	"Flying in the Sky with Everyone"; Transliteration: "Minna de Sora wo Tobu no da" (Japanese: みんなで空を飛ぶのだ)	June 28, 2006
.
14	"Asking Tanabata"; Transliteration: "Tanabata no Onegai na no da" (Japanese: 七夕のおねがいなのだ)	July 5, 2006
.
15	"Searching for Fireflies"; Transliteration: "Hotaru wo Sagasu no da" (Japanese: ホタルをさがすのだ)	July 12, 2006
The Ham-Hams search for fireflies.
16	"Playing at the Sea"; Transliteration: "Umi de Asobu no da" (Japanese: 海で遊ぶのだ)	July 19, 2006
.
17	"Gluttonous Oxnard"; Transliteration: "Kōshi-kun wa Kuishinbō na no da" (Japanese: こうしくんはくいしんぼうなのだ)	July 26, 2006
Oxnard eats all the sunflower seeds Boss had on the Clubhouse table.
18	"Happy Birthday"; Transliteration: "Otanjō bi na no da" (Japanese: おたんじょうびなのだ)	August 2, 2006
.
19	"Brandy and a Nap"; Transliteration: "Don-chan to Ohirune na no da" (Japanese: どんちゃんとお昼寝なのだ)	August 9, 2006
.
20	"The Monster is Here"; Transliteration: "Obake ga Deta no da" (Japanese: オバケが出たのだ)	August 16, 2006
.
21	"Hot, and Cold"; Transliteration: "Atsukute, Samui no da" (Japanese: あつくて、さむいのだ)	August 23, 2006
Howdy and Dexter won't stop arguing, and this upsets Boss, so he makes them exercise, along with Hamtaro.
22	"A Festival for Everyone"; Transliteration: "Minna de Omatsuri na no da" (Japanese: みんなでお祭りなのだ)	August 30, 2006
.
23	"Climbing the Mountain"; Transliteration: "Yama ni Noboru no da" (Japanese: 山にのぼるのだ)	September 6, 2006
.
24	"A Troublesome Big Brother"; Transliteration: "Komatta wo Nī-chan na no da" (Japanese: こまったお兄ちゃんなのだ)	September 13, 2006
Stan forgot he promised to spend time with Sandy, so she has Hamtaro disguise himself as a new friend of hers to make Stan jealous.
25	"Rivals of Love"; Transliteration: "Koi no Raibaru na no da" (Japanese: 恋のライバルなのだ)	September 20, 2006
Pashmina and Penelope plan on going to Cosmos Field, a wonderful field of blooming flowers. Howdy and Dexter fight over who deserves to go with her.
26	"Who is the Culprit?"; Transliteration: "Hannin wa Dare na no da?" (Japanese: 犯人はだれなのだ?)	September 27, 2006
Cappy gets his head stuck in a vase and accidentally trashes the Clubhouse, but he's afraid to admit it.
27	"Knitting Fuss"; Transliteration: "Keito de ō Sawagi na no da" (Japanese: 毛糸でおおさわぎなのだ)	October 4, 2006
Boss accidentally knocks over a ball of red wool, and the Ham-Hams have to chase it through the tunnels.
28	"Eating Too Much"; Transliteration: "Tabe Sugi Chatta no da" (Japanese: 食べすぎちゃったのだ)	October 11, 2006
Boss and Oxnard eat so much that they get as round as beach balls and have to exercise the weight off.
29	"Playing with Acorns"; Transliteration: "Donguri de Asobu no da" (Japanese: どんぐりで遊ぶのだ)	October 18, 2006
The Ham-Hams go to the mountains and make toys out of acorns.
30	"Snoozer's Trip"; Transliteration: "Neteru-kun no Bōken na no da" (Japanese: ねてるくんの冒険なのだ)	October 25, 2006
Boss accidentally launches Snoozer into the air while cleaning the Clubhouse, so Hamtaro has to save him.
31	"Penelope Helps"; Transliteration: "Chibi Maru-chan no Otetsudai na nod a" (Japanese: ちび丸ちゃんのお手伝いなのだ)	November 1, 2006
Penelope helps Pashmina by delivering a box lunch to Howdy and Dexter.
32	"Fashion Show"; Transliteration: "Fasshon Shō na no da" (Japanese: ファッションショーなのだ)	November 8, 2006
.
33	"Meeting Bijou"; Transliteration: "Ribon-chan ni Aitai no da" (Japanese: リボンちゃんに会いたいのだ)	November 15, 2006
Boss gets worried when Bijou is late in coming to the Clubhouse, so he decides to go check on her.
34	"Panda Car"; Transliteration: "Panda Kā na no da" (Japanese: パンダカーなのだ)	November 22, 2006
Panda makes an RV for the Ham-Hams.
35	"Pashmina Loves Knitting"; Transliteration: "Amimono Daisuki Mafurā-chan na no da" (Japanese: あみもの大好きマフラーちゃんなのだ)	November 29, 2006
Howdy and Dexter wonder what Pashmina is knitting.
36	"Skating with Everyone"; Transliteration: "Minna de Sukēto na no da" (Japanese: みんなでスケートなのだ)	December 6, 2006
.
37	"Boss's Secret"; Transliteration: "Taishō-kun no Himitsu na no da" (Japanese: タイショーくんの秘密なのだ)	December 13, 2006
Boss won't let Howdy, Dexter, and Hamtaro into the Clubhouse because he's trying to hide something.
38	"Meeting Santa"; Transliteration: "Santa-san ni Aitai no da" (Japanese: サンタさんに会いたいのだ)	December 20, 2006
The Ham-Hams stay up on Christmas Eve to try to see Santa Claus.
39	"Playing in Snow"; Transliteration: "Yuki de Asobu no da" (Japanese: 雪で遊ぶのだ)	December 27, 2006
.
40	"Playing with Kites"; Transliteration: "Tako de Asobu no da" (Japanese: 凧で遊ぶのだ)	January 10, 2007
.
41	"Boss is Sick"; Transliteration: "Taishō-kun ga Po na no da" (Japanese: タイショーくんがポ〜なのだ)	January 17, 2007
Boss has a cold, so Hamtaro and Bijou take care of him.
42	"Following Footprints"; Transliteration: "Ashiato Ō no da" (Japanese: 足あとをおうのだ)	January 24, 2007
.
43	"Herbert is a Big Success"; Transliteration: "Tonkichi-kun Dai Katsu Yaku na no da" (Japanese: トン吉くん大かつやくなのだ)	January 31, 2007
.
44	"Pashmina is Energetic"; Transliteration: "Mafurā-chan wo Genki ni suru no da" (Japanese: マフラーちゃんを元気にするのだ)	February 7, 2007
.
45	"A Nervous Valentine"; Transliteration: "Sowasowa Barentain na no da" (Japanese: そわそわバレンタインなのだ)	February 14, 2007
.
46	"Snoozer's Dream Trip"; Transliteration: "Neteru-kun no Yume no Tabi na no da" (Japanese: ねてるくんの夢の旅なのだ)	February 21, 2007
.
47	"Penelope the Carpenter"; Transliteration: "Chibi Maru-chan Takusan na no da" (Japanese: ちび丸ちゃん大工さんなのだ)	February 28, 2007
.
48	"Pleasing Boss"; Transliteration: "Taishō-kun wo Yorokoba seru no da" (Japanese: タイショーくんを喜ばせるのだ)	March 7, 2007
.
49	"Oxnard's Big Problem"; Transliteration: "Kōshi-kun Dai Pinchi na no da" (Japanese: こうしくん大ピンチなのだ)	March 14, 2007
.
50	"Riding a Swing"; Transliteration: "Buranko ni Noru no da" (Japanese: ブランコに乗るのだ)	March 21, 2007
Bijou wants to ride on a swing with Hamtaro like Sandy and Maxwell do.
51	"Finding Spring"; Transliteration: "Haru wo Mitsukeru no da" (Japanese: 春をみつけるのだ)	March 28, 2007
The Ham-Hams look for spring.
52	"Finding the Rainbow"; Transliteration: "Niji wo Sagasu no da" (Japanese: 虹をさがすのだ)	April 4, 2007
The Ham-Hams want to see a rainbow.
53	"Exercising"; Transliteration: "Undō suru no da" (Japanese: 運動するのだ)	April 11, 2007
.
54	"A Red Ribbon Present"; Transliteration: "Akai Ribon wo Purezento na no da" (Japanese: 赤いリボンをプレゼントなのだ)	April 18, 2007
Hamtaro gives Bijou a red ribbon he found on the floor.
55	"Chasing Howdy"; Transliteration: "Maido-kun wo Oikakeru no da" (Japanese: まいどくんを追いかけるのだ)	April 25, 2007
Dexter has to save Howdy when he falls asleep on the back of a delivery truck.
56	"Adventure at Home (Part one)" Transliteration: "Oie de Bōken na no da (Zenpen)" (Japanese: お家で冒険なのだ (前編))	June 6, 2007
Hamtaro, Oxnard and Boss play at Hamtaro's house, but they get cornered by a cat.
57	"Adventure at Home (Part two)" Transliteration: "Oie de Bōken na no da (Kōhen)" (Japanese: お家で冒険なのだ (後編))	June 13, 2007
Hamtaro, Oxnard and Boss have to outwit the cat that cornered them in the first half.
58	"A Noisy Brother"; Transliteration: "Urusai wo Nī-chan na no da" (Japanese: うるさいお兄ちゃんなのだ)	June 20, 2007
.
59	"Sparkle and a Date"; Transliteration: "Kururin-chan to Dēto na no da" (Japanese: くるりんちゃんとデートなのだ)	June 27, 2007
Sparkle returns and goes on a date with Hamtaro, but Bijou is jealous and tries to get Hamtaro's attention.
60	"Broski"; Transliteration: "Sāfā-kun na no da" (Japanese: サーファーくんなのだ)	August 29, 2007
.
61	"Laura and the Sunflower Field"; Transliteration: "Roko-chan to Himawari Hatake na no da" (Japanese: ロコちゃんとひまわり畑なのだ)	September 5, 2007
.
62	"It Got Replaced (Part one)" Transliteration: "Ire Kawatsu Chatta no da (Zenpen)" (Japanese: 入れかわっちゃったのだ（前編）)	September 12, 2007
.
63	"It Got Replaced (Part two)" Transliteration: "Ire Kawatsu Chatta no da (Kōhen)" (Japanese: 入れかわっちゃったのだ（後編）)	September 19, 2007
.
64	"Bijou Cannot Play"; Transliteration: "Ribon-chan to Asobenai no da" (Japanese: リボンちゃんと遊べないのだ)	September 26, 2007
.
65	"Makeover! Howdy"; Transliteration: "Daihenshin da! Maido-kun na no da" (Japanese: 大変身だ! まいどくんなのだ)	November 7, 2007
.
66	"Hasty Fighting"; Transliteration: "Kenka wa Yameru no da" (Japanese: ケンカはやめるのだ)	November 14, 2007
.
67	"Unequal Fashion"; Transliteration: "Oshiyare ga Tomaranai no da" (Japanese: おしゃれがとまらないのだ)	November 21, 2007
.
68	"Mole's Digging Ham Dream"; Transliteration: "Yume Hori Hamu no Moguru-kun na no da" (Japanese: ゆめほりハムのもぐるくんなのだ)	September 28, 2007
.
69	"Santa Hamtaro"; Transliteration: "Hamutarō Santa na no da" (Japanese: ハム太郎サンタなのだ)	December 19, 2007
.
70	"Laura's Lost Property"; Transliteration: "Roko-chan no Otoshimono na no da" (Japanese: ロコちゃんのおとしものなのだ)	January 9, 2008
.
71	"Go! Robo-Boss (Part one)" Transliteration: "Yuke! Taishō-Robo na no da (Zenpen)" (Japanese: ゆけ! タイショーロボなのだ（前編）)	January 16, 2008
Boss dreams to have a robot shaped like him.
72	"Go! Robo-Boss (Part 2)"; Transliteration: "Yuke! Taishō-Robo na no da (Kōhen)" (Japanese: ゆけ! タイショーロボなのだ（後編）)	January 23, 2008
.
73	"Hamtaro's Ogre Confrontation"; Transliteration: "Hamutarō no Oni Taiji na no da" (Japanese: ハム太郎の鬼たいじなのだ)	January 30, 2008
Hamtaro and friends act out the story of "Momotaro, the Peach Boy".
74	"A Scary Crow"; Transliteration: "Karasu wa Kowai no da" (Japanese: カラスはこわいのだ)	March 5, 2008
.
75	"The Floral Decoration is Passed"; Transliteration: "Hana Kazari wo Watasu no da" (Japanese: 花かざりを渡すのだ)	March 12, 2008
.
76	"Detective Hamtaro"; Transliteration: "Meitantei Hamutarō na no da" (Japanese: 名探偵ハム太郎なのだ)	March 19, 2008
.
77	"Viewing Cherry Blossoms Together"; Transliteration: "Minna de Ohanami na no da" (Japanese: みんなでお花見なのだ)	March 26, 2008
.
