= Luca Bottale =

Italian voice actor

- Born: Milan, Italy
- Occupation: Voice actor
- Website: www.lucabottale.com

Luca Bottale is an Italian voice actor who contributes to voicing characters in film, television, anime, video games, and more. He is known for dubbing characters from popular TV programs in Italian, such as Usopp from One Piece, Zane Truesdale from Yu-Gi-Oh! GX, and Sly Cooper in the first three games of the Sly Cooper video game series.

== Dubbing ==
=== Animation and anime ===
- Kain in Fire Emblem Anime
- Judeau in Berserk
- Dinosaur Ryuzaki in Yu-Gi-Oh! Duel Monsters
- Ryo Marufuji and Ojama Yellow in Yu-Gi-Oh! Duel Monsters GX
- Yeager and Saiga in Yu-Gi-Oh! 5D's
- Tetsuo Takeda in Yu-Gi-Oh! Zexal
- Johnny in Stoked
- Kankuro in Naruto, Naruto: Shippuden
- Detective Cash Tankinson and other characters in The Batman
- Dr. Roberto Martinez in Max Steel
- Thomas Richard Schubaltz in Zoids: Chaotic Century
- Sparky (Second voice) in Atomic Betty
- Aquaman in Justice League
- Barry the Chopper in Fullmetal Alchemist
- Number 66 in Fullmetal Alchemist: Brotherhood
- Lowly Worm in The Busy World of Richard Scarry (second dub), Busytown Mysteries
- Bot in Team Umizoomi
- Bumble in Fifi and the Flowertots
- Darwin Thornberry in The Wild Thornberrys
- Ryder in Sarah Lee Jones
- Athenina in Trulli Tales
- Dib in Invader Zim
- Cedric in Butt-Ugly Martians
- Brock in Pokémon (season 3 and on), Pokémon: Destiny Deoxys, Pokémon: Lucario and the Mystery of Mew, Pokémon Ranger and the Temple of the Sea, Pokémon: The Rise of Darkrai, Pokémon: Giratina and the Sky Warrior, Pokémon: Arceus and the Jewel of Life, Pokémon: Zoroark: Master of Illusions
- Usopp in One Piece,One Piece: The Movie', Clockwork Island Adventure, Chopper's Kingdom on the Island of Strange Animals, One Piece The Movie: Dead End no Bōken, One Piece: Norowareta Seiken, Baron Omatsuri and the Secret Island, Giant Mecha Soldier of Karakuri Castle
- Pleakley in Stitch!
- Bobby Lee in Odd Job Jack
- Nicky in VeggieTales
- James Jones in Fireman Sam (2004 series)
- George Kojima in Detective Conan (Season 2-present)
- Constable Klang in Pippi Longstocking
- Rabbit in Franklin and Friends
- Worm Raimi in Saint Seiya
- Yutaka Watari in Descendants of Darkness
- John in Tomodachi Life: The TV Series
- Ichitaro Ishikawa in Corrector Yui
- Seiya Uribatake in Martian Successor Nadesico: The Motion Picture – Prince of Darkness
- Horohoro in Shaman King
- Toguro Otouto, Sakashita, Jin (first voice), and Shishiwakamaru in YuYu Hakusho
- Valet 6 in Alpen Rose (second dub)
- Finko in Pink Panther and Sons
- Gian in Doraemon (Second dub)
- Hippo in Mermaid Melody Pichi Pichi Pitch
- Gas in Angels Friends
- Kazuki Sendō in Comic Party
- Tetsuya Watarigani in Beyblade: Metal Fusion
- Mr. Cake and Snails in My Little Pony: Friendship Is Magic
- Zig in Zig & Sharko
- Blocky in ChalkZone

=== Live-action films and shows ===
- Oscar in True Jackson, VP
- Jack Sawyer in Tremors 3: Back to Perfection
- Charlie in The Brotherhood IV
- Jason Lee Scott in Mighty Morphin Power Rangers, Power Rangers Zeo,Turbo: A Power Rangers Movie, Power Rangers in Space
- Prince Malik Namir in Jake 2.0
- Rob Gretton in 24 Hour Party People
- Richard "Woody" Woodford in This Is England

=== Video games ===
- Eddie Brock/Venom in Ultimate Spider-Man
- Sly Cooper in Sly Cooper and the Thievius Raccoonus, Sly 2: Band of Thieves, Sly 3: Honor Among Thieves
- Nick Scryer in Psi-Ops: The Mindgate Conspiracy
- Varimathras, Bloodfeather, and other characters in Warcraft III: The Frozen Throne
- Neeloc Greedyfingers and other characters in Warcraft III: Reign of Chaos
- Malvaren, Icarus, and other characters in Avencast: Rise of the Mage
- Tom, Harry, and other characters in The Black Mirror
- Broken Sword: The Sleeping Dragon
- Price, Powell, and Stolls in The Thing
- Phoenix Wright in Professor Layton vs. Phoenix Wright: Ace Attorney
