= Alessandro Rigotti =

Italian voice actor

- Born: 20 April 1978 (age 48); Turin, Italy
- Occupation: Voice actor

Alessandro Rigotti (born 20 April 1978) is an Italian voice actor. Alessandro contributes to dubbing characters in cartoons, anime, sitcoms, and more content.

He is well known for providing the voice of Sasuke Uchiha in the Italian-language versions of Naruto and Naruto: Shippuden. He also provided the voice of the character Mohinder Suresh in the Italian-language version of Heroes.

== Voice work ==
=== Anime and animation ===
- Sasuke Uchiha in Naruto
- Sasuke Uchiha in Naruto: Shippuden
- Sasuke Uchiha in Naruto the Movie: Ninja Clash in the Land of Snow
- Chazz Princeton in Yu-Gi-Oh! GX
- Pierre Tempête de Neige in Sugar Sugar Rune
- Xandir in Drawn Together
- Kyosuke Takakura in Nana
- Lemaire in Blue Dragon
- Richard "Richie" Osgood Foley in Static Shock
- Daichi Fuwa and Ippei Toyama in Whistle!
- Mikey Simon in Kappa Mikey
- Zane in Lego Ninjago: Masters of Spinjitzu
- Reggie in Pokémon
- Zero in Pokémon: Giratina and the Sky Warrior
- Tony Star/Iron Man (First voice) in Iron Man: Armored Adventures
- Ukyo in Samurai 7
- Garline in Vampire Princess Miyu
- Rodney in The Life & Times of Tim
- Phantom in MÄR
- Ikuto Tsukiyomi in Shugo Chara!
- Joshua Christopher in Chrono Crusade
- Maximilien Robespierre in Le Chevalier D'Eon
- Juda in Legends of the Dark King
- Tim and Diego (Second voice) in Titeuf
- Tatsuhiro Satō in Welcome to the N.H.K.
- Hal Jordan/Green Lantern in Green Lantern: The Animated Series

=== Live action ===
- Mohinder Suresh in Heroes
- Rudy Wade in Misfits
- Owen Hunt in Grey's Anatomy
- Simon Brenner in ER
- Patrick Brewer in McLeod's Daughters
- Ashur in Spartacus
- Steven "Flash" Gordon in Flash Gordon
- Josh Nichols in Drake & Josh
- Christian Castellhoff in Alisa – Folge deinem Herzen
- Quinn Andrews in Everything You Want
- Antonio in Monster Warriors
- Phil in Backrooms

=== Video games ===
- Desmond Miles in Assassin's Creed
- Desmond Miles in Assassin's Creed II
- Desmond Miles in Assassin's Creed: Brotherhood
- Desmond Miles in Assassin's Creed: Revelations
- Leon S. Kennedy in Resident Evil: Operation Raccoon City
- Leon S. Kennedy in Resident Evil 6
- Leon S. Kennedy in Resident Evil 2
- Leon S. Kennedy in Resident Evil 4
- Ratchet in PlayStation All-Stars Battle Royale
- Norman Jayden in Heavy Rain
