= Angel's Friends =

- Cover of the first original DVD.
- Genre: Contemporary fantasy, romance
- Created by: Simona Ferri
- Written by: Francesco Balletta, Francesco Arlanch
- Directed by: Orlando Corradi
- Voices of: (English version); Liza Kaplan as Raf; Serra Hirsch as Uri; Lisa Adams as Sweet; Lisa Ortiz as Miki; Jason Griffith as Sulfus; Lisa Ortiz as Cabiria; Summer Crocket Moore as Kabale; Dan Green as Gas (Italian version); Patrizia Mottola as Raf; Benedetta Ponticelli as Urié; Francesca Bielli as Dolce; Marcella Silvestri as Miki; Simone D'Andrea as Sulfus; Maddalena Vadacca as Cabiria; Emanuela Pacotto as Kabalè; Luca Bottale as Gas
- Theme music composer: Danilo Bernardi, Giuseppe Zanca
- Opening theme: Angel's Friends performed by Cristina D'Avena
- Ending theme: Angel's Friends performed by Cristina D'Avena
- Country of origin: Italy
- Original language: Italian
- No. of seasons: 2
- No. of episodes: 104

Production
- Running time: 13 minutes
- Production companies: Mondo TV; R.T.I. Play Entertainment

Original release
- Network: Italia 1
- Release: 12 October 2009 – 27 March 2010 (first season)

Angel's Friends is an Italian comic series created by Simona Ferri that debuted in March 2007. On 12 October 2009, an animated series of the same name premiered on Italia 1. A second season of 52 episodes was announced in January 2011.

A television film, Angel's Friends – Tra Sogno e Realtà (Angel's Friends: Between Dream and Reality), premiered on 23 April 2011.

In the United States, the show is available via CBS, syndication and many local stations air the program on their secondary subchannel service to fulfill FCC mandates (at least three hours of E/I related material per week). The second season, dubbed in English, French and Russian, has been uploaded to YouTube by Mondo TV in September 2014.

A live-action adaptation of the animated series (either a TV series or a movie) is in talks. A teaser pilot titled Darkly was produced in 2016 by Play Entertainment and Mad Rocket Entertainment, adapted by Daniele Cosci and directed by Alessio Liguori, with Alessandro Danzi as Sulfus, Demetra Bellina as Raf and Denise Tantucci as Reina. The plot is aimed to an older audience and follows a darker storyline, where Raf and Sulfus are killed by Reina and reborn as humans without memories.

== Plot ==
Four Angels (Raf, Uri, Sweet and Miki) and four Devils/Demons (Sulfus, Cabiria, Kabale and Gas) are sent to Earth in an unused area of the Golden School, where they learn everything they need to become Guardian Angels and Guardian Devils. The Angels and Devils are required to form pairs as part of their education, each of which will have to deal with a human being, known as Earthly Ones, and help them choose between the right and wrong way in life without being discovered. Angels and Devils cannot operate at the same time, so they decide, clashing in the Challenge Room, who will work first. Moreover, they are subject to the V.E.T.O. (Vetoed from Exposing, Touching or Obstructing/Overhearing in the comic – Italian: Vietato Esporsi, Toccare, Ostacolare/Origliare).

=== Comic plot ===
While the Angels and Devils are attending their stage on Earth, the planet is threatened by ancient creatures, the Reliveds, led by a mysterious man called Maliki. He was a Devil who gave up his eternal life because he loved a human woman named Vera. When she left him, he decided to take revenge on all Angels, Devils and humans. As a result, the Angels and Devils form an alliance to fight against him.

=== Cartoon plot ===
==== First season ====
The evil Neutral One, Reina, imprisoned in the Limbo with her servant Maliki, wants to take revenge of Angels and Devils who confined her. To get free, a sacrilege is necessary: because of this, she exploits the rising feelings between Raf, an Angel, and Sulfus, a Devil, forcing them to kiss. The sacrilege breaks the chains and Reina, once free, tells the truth about her origins to Raf: she was born a human, not an angel and was adopted by the High Spheres when her parents, two powerful sovereigns, died during the struggle between Angels and Devils. Reina persuades Raf to enter in the Hall of Portraits to see her parents' faces: while Raf is in, Reina steals all of the portraits to control the Earthly One's will. At the end of the first season, using the Prism Fly ability, Raf and Sulfus manage to defeat Reina. Raf discovers that her real father is Maliki, who sacrifices himself to save her, while her mom is imprisoned somewhere in an endless slumber by two warlords.

==== Second season ====
After the Summer vacations, Angels and Devils return to the Golden School to begin the second year of their stage, their new Earthly Ones are given to them. Meanwhile, Sulfus is blackmailed by two masked Eternals who hold in their possession Raf's mom, Angelie. In order to make sure Sulfus does not try to escape their control, a mysterious girl, Blu, watches over him. Raf and Sulfus' love is highly tested with the appearance of these new enemies and more mysteries about Raf's past are revealed. At the end of the second season, Raf and Sulfus learn that the School's Angel principal and also angelic army general, Cassidy, and Devil principal and also demonic army general, Kubral, manipulated them in order to destroy the V.E.T.O.'s scales and wage war against each other. The season ends on a cliffhanger of Blue, the princess of Limbo, who goes back to Limbo with what she wanted by the two warlords and frees Reina. Although there is no sign of a season 3 in the works.

== Differences between comic and cartoon ==
- In the comic, the main characters are younger: in fact, while in the cartoon, they are the same age as Raf (15 "stars", as for the Angels, or "flashes", as for the Devils), in the comic, Raf is 12, Uri is 11 and Miki is 9; Sulfus is 13, Kabale and Gas are 10, Cabiria is 11.
- Sweet (whose original Italian name is Dolce), Misha and Reina don't appear in the comic, while the Angel Ang-Lì, the Devil Mephisto, and Raoul, the Earthly one loved by Raf, aren't shown in the cartoon.
- In the comic, the hobbies of Angels and Devils are shown, while in the cartoon, they are not. For example, Raf is keen on ecological remedies, such as beauty masks and infusions, Miki is a music expert, Kabale loves chemistry, alchemy and numerology. Cabiria likes films, cartoons and comics and she's a director and an illustrator. Gabe is a genius of technology and uses a handheld.
- In the comic, Angels are part of a funk band, in which Raf is the vocalist, Gabe plays the keyboard, Miki the bass, Uri the drums and Ang-Lì the sax. The Devils have their own rock band: Sulfus plays the bass, Kabale the electric guitar, Cabiria the drums, Gas the keyboard and Mephisto is the vocalist.
- In the comic, Miki is repeating the school year because she tried to heal her Earthly one, breaking the V.E.T.O. Sulfus behaves like a seducer, which doesn't happen in the cartoon.
- The character design of the cartoon is far different than that of the comic.
- In the comic, Arkhan and Temptel don't teach "positive Earthly life" and "negative Earthly life", but "positive Earthly infancy" and "negative Earthly infancy", as the characters are younger.

== Places ==
Angie Town

Angels' city, it's a peaceful home located in the Paradise. It's ruled by the High Spheres (Italian: Alte Sfere), whose messengers are the seraphims.

Sulfur City (Italian: Zolfanello City)

Devils' city, it's a chaotic place, located in Hell. It's ruled by the Low Spheres (Italian: Basse Sfere), whose messengers are the malebolge. Also called "Match City".

Earthly city
It's the city where the Earthly ones live. Its name is unknown, but it looks like European metropolis.

Golden School
It's the school where the Earthly ones study, an old building located in the Earthly city. In an unused area, Angels and Devils attend their classes. In the middle, there is the Central Ala, where classrooms are located; in the same hallway, there's the Challenge Room (Italian: Aula Sfida), where Angels and Devils clash. In the tower, there are the Dreaming Rooms (Italian: Sognatori), Angels' dormitories, while underground there are the Incubators (Italian: Incubatori), Devils' dormitories.

Mistery House
Reina and Maliki's house after leaving the Limbo. Previously, it was Raf's family's house.

Limbo
It's the place where Reina was imprisoned since her exile, a place outside the control of both the High and Low Spheres. Only a sacrilege between an Angel and a Devil is powerful enough to break the wall of the prison. Maliki also lives here with his mistress, but he's allowed to go to the real world.

Path of Metamorphosis
A legendary path, rich in trials and obstacles, which, if passed, would allow Angels or Devils to become human. Tyco and Sai decided to try it, but after reaching the end, they didn't manage to transform and were obliged to separate. In it, the Sigh of Deception (or Wind of Metamorphosis) blows: it's a powerful wind that inhibits reasons and pulls humans, Angels and Devils to act impulsively. The Path of Metamorphosis appears for the first time in the movie Between Dream and Reality. At the end of the second season, Raf and Sulfus made the decision to walk the path together.

Sunny College
It's the place where the Angels and Devils went to take summer classes together. They were taught about Earthly Acting.

Princess Theater
While the Angels and Devils were taking summer courses, the Earthly Ones were assigned to perform a play at a nearby abandoned theater. The theater was closed down because Tyco didn't want to see plays that reminded him of his feelings for Sai.

== Episodes ==
The cartoon is produced by R.T.I., Mondo TV and Play Entertainment, directed by Orlando Corradi and written by Francesco Arlanch and Francesco Balletta. However, the first one who released the cartoon (26 episodes lasting 20 minutes each) was the Italian company Stranemani, but during the comic festival in Cannes, the version by Mondo TV was chosen, despite the Stranemani version using the same character designs from the comic.

=== First season (2009–2010) ===
In Italy, Mondo Home Entertainment released the first season in ten DVDs, starting in November 2009. DVDs were also sold in Czech Republic (8 DVDs titled Andílci) and Russia (6 DVDs).

No.	English and Italian titles	Italian air date (Italia 1)	U.S. air date (syndication)
1	"Flying with her own Wings" "Volare con le proprie ali"	12 October 2009	27 September 2010
2	"Friends Forever" "Amiche per la pelle"	13 October 2009	TBA
3	"Poor Devil" "Povero Diavolo"	14 October 2009	TBA
4	"Real Beauty" "La vera bellezza"	15 October 2009	TBA
5	"The Rules of the Game" "Le regole del gioco"	16 October 2009	TBA
6	"Protection" "Protezione"	19 October 2009	TBA
7	"Truth and Lies" "Verità e bugie"	20 October 2009	TBA
8	""Who sows wind, reaps a storm"" "Chi semina vento raccoglie tempesta"	21 October 2009	TBA
9	"Life on Earth" "Vita da Terreno"	22 October 2009	TBA
10	"Divided" "Divisi"	23 October 2009	TBA
11	"A Secret Meeting" "Appuntamento segreto"	26 October 2009	TBA
12	"Prisoners of the heart" "Prigionieri del cuore"	27 October 2009	TBA
13	"The Deadly Labyrinth" "Labirinto mortale"	28 October 2009	TBA
14	"Face to Face" "Scontro frontale"	29 October 2009	TBA
15	"Reina's Deception" "L'inganno di Reina"	30 October 2009	TBA
16	"Guardian Angel, Guardian Devil" "Guardian Angel, Guardian Devil"	2 November 2009	TBA
17	"Playing with Fire" "Giocare col fuoco"	3 November 2009	TBA
18	"The Caves of Obscurity" "Alle Grotte di Oscuria"	4 November 2009	TBA
19	"Life in Danger" "Vite in pericolo"	5 November 2009	TBA
20	"From Sunset to Sunrise" "Dal tramonto all'alba"	6 November 2009	TBA
21	"Threats on the Horizon" "Minacce all'orizzonte"	9 November 2009	TBA
22	"24 Hours" "Ventiquattro ore"	10 November 2009	TBA
23	"On the Edge of the Abyss" "Sull'orlo del baratro"	11 November 2009	TBA
24	"Revenge of the Angels" "La rivincita delle Angels"	12 November 2009	TBA
25	"The Trap of Time" "Nella trappola del tempo"	13 November 2009	TBA
26	"Two couples, a destiny" "Due coppie, un destino"	16 November 2009	TBA
27	"Sacrilege" "Sacrilegio"	9 January 2010	TBA
28	"Disciplinary Procedures" "Procedimento disciplinare"	10 January 2010	TBA
29	"Goodbye to the Golden School" "Addio alla Golden School"	16 January 2010	TBA
30	"The Last Chance" "L'ultima chance"	17 January 2010	TBA
31	"Everlasting detective" "Detective sempiterni"	30 January 2010	TBA
32	"Dream or Reality?" "Sogno o realtà?"	31 January 2010	TBA
33	"Innocent" "Innocenti"	6 February 2010	TBA
34	"The Legend of Reina" "La leggenda di Reina"	7 February 2010	TBA
35	"Dangerous Shortcuts" "Scorciatoie pericolose"	7 February 2010	TBA
36	"Blow under the belt" "Colpi bassi"	13 February 2010	TBA
37	"To Regain "Terrestrial"" "Riconquistare "Terreno""	14 February 2010	TBA
38	"Mistery Party" "Mistery Party"	14 February 2010	TBA
39	"Little Sweet... or Little Joke?" "Dolcetto... o scherzetto?"	20 February 2010	TBA
40	"Together Forever" "Per sempre insieme"	21 February 2010	TBA
41	"Face to Face with Reina" "Faccia a faccia con Reina"	21 February 2010	TBA
42	"The Test" "La prova"	27 February 2010	TBA
43	"Someone to Trust" "Qualcuno di cui fidarsi"	27 February 2010	TBA
44	"Duel and Temptation" "Duello e tentazione"	28 February 2010	TBA
45	"Capable of Anything" "Disposta a tutto"	28 February 2010	TBA
46	"The Room of Portraits" "La Stanza dei Ritratti"	6 March 2010	TBA
47	"War Atmosphere" "Aria di guerra"	7 March 2010	TBA
48	"Ultimatum to the Earth" "Ultimatum alla Terra"	13 March 2010	TBA
49	"In the Wolf's Den" "Nella tana del lupo"	14 March 2010	TBA
50	"Sacrifice" "Sacrificio"	20 March 2010	TBA
51	"Final Clash" "Scontro finale"	21 March 2010	TBA
52	"Goodbye Golden School" "Arrivederci Golden School"	27 March 2010	TBA
Movie	"Angel's Friends: Between Dream and Reality" "Angel's Friends – Tra Sogno e Realtà"	23 April 2011	TBA

=== Second season (2011–2012) ===
No.	English and Italian titles
1	"A New Beginning (Part One)"
2	"A New Beginning (Part Two)"
3	"Earthling Alarm (Part One)"
4	"Earthling Alarm (Part Two)"
5	"The Best Friend (Part One)"
6	"The Best Friend (Part Two)"
7	"Magic Miki and DJ Gas (Part One)"
8	"Magic Miki and DJ Gas (Part Two)"
9	"Foolish Pride (Part One)"
10	"Foolish Pride (Part Two)"
11	"Geography Lesson (Part One)"
12	"Geography Lesson (Part Two)"
13	"Battle at the Coliseum (Part One)"
14	"Battle at the Coliseum (Part Two)"
15	"Nobody Is Perfect (Part One)"
16	"Nobody Is Perfect (Part Two)"
17	"Imprisoned (Part One)"
18	"Imprisoned (Part Two)"
19	"Group Projection (Part One)"
20	"Group Projection (Part Two)"
21	"The Gorth Castle (Part One)"
22	"The Gorth Castle (Part Two)"
23	"Love And Hate (Part One)"
24	"Love And Hate (Part Two)"
25	"Spring Dance (Part One)"
26	"Spring Dance (Part Two)"
27	"Disharmonic Vibration (Part One)"
28	"Disharmonic Vibration (Part Two)"
29	"Guilty And Innocent (Part One)"
30	"Guilty And Innocent (Part Two)"
31	"Friendship Proof (Part One)"
32	"Friendship Proof (Part Two)"
33	"Friends Forever (Part One)"
34	"Friends Forever (Part Two)"
35	"Secret Meeting (Part One)"
36	"Secret Meeting (Part Two)"
37	"Mission Impossible (Part One)"
38	"Mission Impossible (Part Two)"
39	"In Enemy Territory (Part One)"
40	"In Enemy Territory (Part Two)"
41	"Apocalypse! (Part One)"
42	"Apocalypse! (Part Two)"
43	"And If They Would Win (Part One)"
44	"And If They Would Win (Part Two)"
45	"Brothers in War (Part One)"
46	"Brothers in War (Part Two)"
47	"Darklight Fly (Part One)"
48	"Darklight Fly (Part Two)"
49	"The Last Embrace (Part One)"
50	"The Last Embrace (Part Two)"
51	"The Universe Balance (Part One)"
52	"The Universe Balance (Part Two)"

== Film ==
A television movie based on the animated series and settled between the first and the second season aired, in Italy, on 23 April 2011. The movie focuses on the Angels attending the Summer School at the Sunny College in Alpinville, where Raf hopes she will not meet Sulfus. The Devils show up at the school and Raf tells Sulfus she has fallen in love with someone else. Meanwhile, the Earthly ones receive the task of refurbishing the Theatre of Princes (Italian: Teatro dei Principi) and organising a play, Romeo & Juliet by William Shakespeare. However, they are attacked by a mysterious hooded man who wants them to leave the theatre. The Angels and the Devils decide to investigate and find out the truth about Tyco and Sai's fate. At last, Raf and Sulfus conclude that they'll decide what to do about their future together once returned to the Golden School for the new term.

== CD ==
On 2 November 2010, a CD dedicated to Angel's Friends was released. The album, produced by Mediaset record company, contains the full Italian opening theme performed by Cristina D'Avena and several songs named after the characters of the series, 11 songs totally. The tracks are in English, but the opening theme.

1. Angel's Friends – Cristina D'Avena
2. Cabiria – Kate Kelly
3. Kabalè – Gabriella Vainiglia
4. Malachia – Silvio Pozzoli
5. Gas – Antonio Divincenzo
6. Miki – Maria Concetta Montesano
7. Raf – Gisella Cozzo
8. Sulfus – Mark Evans
9. Reina – Jacobs Sewit Villa
10. Dolce – Fabiana Vitellio
11. Uriè – Barbara Comi

== International broadcast ==
Angel's Friends was distributed all over the world, in countries like Spain, Portugal, Latin America, Belgium, Luxembourg, Bulgaria, Czech Republic, Slovakia, Ex-Yugoslavia. As of April 2010, the license has been sold in 37 countries.

== Publications ==
=== Comic ===
Angel's Friends

Publication information
- Publisher: Play Press
- Schedule: Monthly, then bimonthly
- Genre: FantasySchool; Magic
- Publication date: March 2007 – January 2008
- No. of issues: 11

Creative team
- Created by: Simona Ferri
- Written by: Bruno Enna
- Artist: Giada Perissinotto

The monthly publication of the comic Angel's Friends by Play Press began in March 2007. The printed version was edited by Red Whale and Yellow Whale, scripted by Bruno Enna and drawn by Giada Perissinotto. The publication was discontinued in January 2008 with the release of Chapter 14, A Spark in the Heart.

A second version of the comic, based on the cartoon, was published bimonthly by Preziosi Collection since 2009, in Angel's Friends Magazine. It was discontinued after the release of No. 4.

==== Chapters of Play Press comic ====
1. The Eternal Day (Italian: Il Giorno Eterno)
2. The Watcher (Italian: L'Osservatore)
3. Only Two Steps (Italian: Solo Due Passi)
4. A Tiny Evil (Italian: Un Piccolo Male)
5. Angels' City (Italian: La Città degli Angeli)
6. Sulfus's Shadow (Italian: L'Ombra di Sulfus)
7. The Neutralmancer (Italian: Il Neutromante)
8. Secret-Blurter (Italian: Spiffera-Segreto)
9. The Guardian (Italian: Il Custode)
10. Never More Together (Italian: Mai Più Insieme)
11. The Other Side of Love (Italian: L'Altra Faccia dell'Amore)
12. The Susceptible Point (Italian: Il Punto Sensibile)
13. Between Dream and Reality (Italian: Tra Sogno e Realtà)
14. A Spark in the Heart (Italian: Una Scintilla nel Cuore)

==== Chapters of Preziosi comic ====
1. Chasing the wind (Italian: Rincorrere il vento)
2. Unsaid things (Italian: Le cose non-dette)
3. The storm (Italian: La tempesta)
4. Between Good and Evil (Italian: Fra Bene e Male)

=== Books ===
- Angel's Friends – Diario segreto. Giunti Junior. 2009. p. 130. ISBN 978-88-09-74428-8.
- Troiano, Rosalba (2009). Il mondo di Angel's Friends. Giunti Junior. p. 132. ISBN 978-88-09-05839-2.

=== Novels ===
- Troiano, Rosalba (2009). Segreti e ombre alla Golden School. Giunti Junior. p. 288. ISBN 978-88-09-74427-1.
- Troiano, Rosalba (2009). Tutta colpa di un bacio. Giunti Junior. p. 256. ISBN 978-88-09-74982-5.
- Troiano, Rosalba (2011). Tra sogno e realtà. Giunti Junior. p. 128. ISBN 978-88-09-75887-2.

== Reception ==
In Italy, the first season got an average share of 8.2%, sometimes reaching 11%.
