= Ozie Boo! =

French preschool television series

Ozie Boo! is a French 3D computer-animated television series for preschoolers of 2 to 5 years old; produced by the French production company Cyber Group Studios, a company based in Paris, France. In France, the first season aired on September 4, 2006 on France 5, while the second season was launched on Canal J and TiJi.

The show aired internationally on Playhouse Disney in Latin America, Germany and Italy, RTP2 and Canal Panda in Portugal, Hop! and Luil TV in Israel and Yumurcak TV in Turkey.

The first and second seasons have a length of 6 minutes. In 2010, a spin-off known as "Ozie Boo! Save the Planet" (Ozie Boo! Protège ta planète) started to air on TiJi and follows the 5 penguins, who learn about helping the environment in a classroom with their teacher, Mr. Pelican. The show was produced with the participation of CNC and WWF.

== Synopsis ==
Ozie Boo! tells the story of five baby penguins, four boys and a girl, who learn to cohabit in a joyous and friendly way and have many adventures in their home, located in the middle of the Atlantic Ocean.

== Characters ==
The Ozie boos are five 3D CGI baby penguins. They are adventuorus and when they get their backpacks ready, they explore, learn to sing, dance, and play.

- Ed (green)
- Fred (orange)
- Ned (blue)
- Nelly (pink)
- Ted (red)

Other characters include:

- Rajah, the baby Siberian tiger
- Mikky and Nikky the polar bear cubs
- Mel the starfish
- Wally and Polly, the baby belugas
- Sky the albatross
- Mr. Pelican
