= List of theme songs recorded by Cristina D'Avena =

Most of Cristina D'Avena's songs are opening and closing themes of animated series aired by Mediaset (previously Fininvest) television channels. Some songs are themes of television series and television programs. In the following list they are listed by year.

== Songs ==
Light-green background in "Title" indicates songs which are Italian adaptation of original theme.

Year	Title	Music by	Lyrics by	Album	Italian theme song of	Notes
1981	"Bambino Pinocchio"	Augusto Martelli	Luciano Beretta	Do re mi... Five - Cantiamo con Five	Piccolino no Bōken	
1982	"Mon Ciccì"	Mario Marini	Roberto Garbarino	Do re mi... Five - Cantiamo con Five	Monchhichi Twins	
1982	"Laura"	Augusto Martelli	Mario Rasini	Do re mi... Five - Cantiamo con Five	Laura, the Prairie Girl	
1982	"Tutti abbiamo un cuore"	Giovanni D'Aquila	Luciano Beretta and Albano Bertoni	Do re mi... Five - Cantiamo con Five	Little Women	
1982	"Canzone dei Puffi"	Dan Lacksman	Alessandra Valeri Manera	Fivelandia	The Smurfs	
1983	"Lucy"	Augusto Martelli	Luciano Beretta	Fivelandia	Lucy-May of the Southern Rainbow	
1983	"La regina dei mille anni"	Augusto Martelli	Alessandra Valeri Manera	Fivelandia	Queen Millennia	
1983	"I ragazzi della Senna"	Augusto Martelli	Alessandra Valeri Manera	Fivelandia	La Seine no Hoshi	
1983	"John e Solfami"	Henri Seroka	Alessandra Valeri Manera	Fivelandia	The Smurfs	
1983	"New Five Time"	Augusto Martelli	Alessandra Valeri Manera	Fivelandia	Five Time	With Marco Columbro
1984	"I ragazzi della Senna (Il tulipano nero)"	Augusto Martelli	Alessandra Valeri Manera	Fivelandia	La Seine no Hoshi	
1984	"Là sui monti con Annette"	Giordano Bruno Martelli	Alessandra Valeri Manera	Fivelandia 2	Story of the Alps: My Annette	
1984	"Bum Bum"	Augusto Martelli	Alessandra Valeri Manera and Vladimiro Albera	Fivelandia 2	Hoero! Bun Bun	
1984	"Puffi la la la"	Hoyt Curtin, William Hanna, Joseph Barbera and Alessandra Valeri Manera		Fivelandia 2	The Smurfs	
1984	"Georgie"	Alberto Baldan Bembo and Vladimiro Albera	Alessandra Valeri Manera	Fivelandia 2	Lady Georgie	
1984	"Nanà supergirl"	Piero Cassano	Alessandra Valeri Manera	Fivelandia 2	Nanako SOS	
1984	"Pollon, Pollon combinaguai"	Piero Cassano	Alessandra Valeri Manera and Vladimiro Albera	Fivelandia 2	Little Pollon	
1985	"L'incantevole Creamy"	Giordano Bruno Martelli	Alessandra Valeri Manera	Fivelandia 3	Creamy Mami, the Magic Angel	
1985	"Ciao Ciao"	Augusto Martelli	Alessandra Valeri Manera	None	Ciao Ciao	
1985	"Il grande sogno di Maya"	Detto Mariano	Alessandra Valeri Manera	Fivelandia 3	Glass Mask	
1985	"Rascal il mio amico orsetto"	Augusto Martelli	Luciano Beretta	Fivelandia 3	Rascal the Raccoon	
1985	"Evelyn e la magia di un sogno d'amore"	Giordano Bruno Martelli	Alessandra Valeri Manera	Fivelandia 3	Persia, the Magic Fairy	
1985	"Kiss Me Licia"	Giordano Bruno Martelli	Alessandra Valeri Manera	Fivelandia 3	Ai Shite Knight	
1985	"Le avventure della dolce Katy"	Detto Mariano	Alessandra Valeri Manera	Fivelandia 3	Katri, Girl of the Meadows	
1985	"Lo strano mondo di Minù"	Gianfranco Intra	Alessandra Valeri Manera	Fivelandia 3	Mrs. Pepper Pot	
1985	"Occhi di gatto"	Ninni Carucci	Alessandra Valeri Manera	Fivelandia 3	Cat's Eye	
1985	"Che bello essere un Puffo"	Mireille Delfosse, Christopher Lonk and Alessandra Valeri Manera		Fivelandia 3	The Smurfs	
1985	"Arrivano gli Snorky"	J.F.F. Ferry Wienneke, Jay Ferne and Alessandra Valeri Manera		Fivelandia 3	The Snorks	
1985	"Memole dolce Memole"	Giordano Bruno Martelli	Alessandra Valeri Manera	Fivelandia 3	Little Memole	
1986	"Mila e Shiro due cuori nella pallavolo"	Ninni Carucci	Alessandra Valeri Manera	Fivelandia 4	Attacker You!	
1986	"Lovely Sara"	Giordano Bruno Martelli	Alessandra Valeri Manera	Fivelandia 4	Princess Sara	
1986	"Magica, magica Emi"	Giordano Bruno Martelli	Alessandra Valeri Manera	Fivelandia 4	Magical Emi, the Magic Star	
1986	"Love Me Licia"	Giordano Bruno Martelli	Alessandra Valeri Manera	Fivelandia 4	Love Me Licia	
1986	"Il mago di Oz"	Ninni Carucci	Alessandra Valeri Manera	Fivelandia 4	The Wonderful Wizard of Oz	
1986	"Noi Snorky incontrerai"	Giordano Bruno Martelli	Alessandra Valeri Manera	Fivelandia 4	The Snorks	
1986	"David gnomo amico mio"	Ninni Carucci	Alessandra Valeri Manera	Fivelandia 4	The World of David the Gnome	
1986	"Puffa di qua, puffa di là"	Giordano Bruno Martelli	Alessandra Valeri Manera	Fivelandia 4	The Smurfs	
1986	"Alla scoperta di Babbo Natale"	Ninni Carucci	Alessandra Valeri Manera	Fivelandia 4	Elves of the Forest	
1987	"Vola mio mini Pony"	Ninni Carucci	Alessandra Valeri Manera	Cristina D'Avena con i tuoi amici in TV	My Little Pony	
1987	"Sandy dai mille colori"	Giordano Bruno Martelli	Alessandra Valeri Manera	Cristina D'Avena con i tuoi amici in TV	Pastel Yumi, the Magic Idol	
1987	"Licia dolce Licia"	Giordano Bruno Martelli	Alessandra Valeri Manera	Fivelandia 5	Licia dolce Licia	
1987	"Pollyanna"	Ninni Carucci	Alessandra Valeri Manera	Fivelandia 5	The Story of Pollyanna, Girl of Love	
1987	"Alice nel paese delle meraviglie"	Giordano Bruno Martelli	Alessandra Valeri Manera	Fivelandia 5	Fushigi no Kuni no Alice	
1987	"Jem"	Ninni Carucci	Alessandra Valeri Manera	Fivelandia 5	Jem and the Holograms	
1987	"Piccola bianca Sibert"	Ninni Carucci	Alessandra Valeri Manera	Fivelandia 5	Seabert	
1987	"Teneramente Licia"	Ninni Carucci	Alessandra Valeri Manera	Fivelandia 5	Teneramente Licia	
1987	"Maple Town: un nido di simpatia"	Ninni Carucci	Alessandra Valeri Manera	Fivelandia 5	Maple Town	
1987	"Ogni Puffo pufferà"	Ninni Carucci	Alessandra Valeri Manera	Fivelandia 5	The Smurfs	
1987	"Princesse Sarah"	Giordano Bruno Martelli	Alessandra Valeri Manera			"Lovely Sara" song in French language
1988	"Hilary"	Ninni Carucci	Alessandra Valeri Manera	Cristina D'Avena e i tuoi amici in TV 2	Hikari no Densetsu	
1988	"Denny"	Ninni Carucci	Alessandra Valeri Manera	Cristina D'Avena e i tuoi amici in TV 2	Dennis the Menace	
1988	"Che famiglia è questa family!"	Ninni Carucci	Alessandra Valeri Manera	Cristina D'Avena e i tuoi amici in TV 2	Family!	
1988	"Fufur superstar"	Ninni Carucci	Alessandra Valeri Manera	Cristina D'Avena e i tuoi amici in TV 2	Foofur	
1988	"Balliamo e cantiamo con Licia"	Ninni Carucci	Alessandra Valeri Manera	Fivelandia 6	Balliamo e cantiamo con Licia	
1988	"Principessa dai capelli blu"	Massimiliano Pani	Alessandra Valeri Manera	Fivelandia 6	Bosco Adventure	
1988	"Kolby e i suoi piccoli amici"	Ninni Carucci	Alessandra Valeri Manera	Fivelandia 6	Adventures of the Little Koala	
1988	"Una per tutte, tutte per una"	Ninni Carucci	Alessandra Valeri Manera	Fivelandia 6	Tales of Little Women	
1988	"Una sirenetta fra noi"	Enzo Draghi	Alessandra Valeri Manera	Fivelandia 6	Mahō no Mako-chan	
1988	"Siamo quelli di Beverly Hills"	Ninni Carucci	Alessandra Valeri Manera	Fivelandia 6	Beverly Hills Teens	
1988	"Lady Lovely"	Enzo Draghi	Alessandra Valeri Manera	Cristina D'Avena e i tuoi amici in TV 2	Lady Lovely Locks	
1988	"Palla al centro per Rudy"	Enzo Draghi	Alessandra Valeri Manera	Fivelandia 6	Ganbare, Kickers!	
1988	"Prendi il mondo e vai"	Massimiliano Pani	Alessandra Valeri Manera	Fivelandia 6	Touch	
1988	"Viaggiamo con Benjamin"	Ninni Carucci	Alessandra Valeri Manera	Fivelandia 6	Wisdom of the Gnomes	
1988	"Arriva Cristina"	Ninni Carucci	Alessandra Valeri Manera	Fivelandia 6	Arriva Cristina	
1988	"Puffi qua e là"	Enzo Draghi	Alessandra Valeri Manera	Fivelandia 6	The Smurfs	
1988	"D'Artagnan e i moschettieri del re"	Ninni Carucci	Alessandra Valeri Manera	Cristina D'Avena e i tuoi amici in TV 3	The Three Musketeers Anime	
1989	"Milly un giorno dopo l'altro"	Ninni Carucci	Alessandra Valeri Manera	Cristina D'Avena e i tuoi amici in TV 3	Lady Lady!! and Hello! Lady Lynn	
1989	"È quasi magia, Johnny!"	Ninni Carucci	Alessandra Valeri Manera	Cristina D'Avena e i tuoi amici in TV 3	Kimagure Orange Road	
1989	"Siamo fatti così - Esplorando il corpo umano"	Massimiliano Pani	Alessandra Valeri Manera	Cristina D'Avena e i tuoi amici in TV 3	Once Upon a Time... Life	
1989	"Questa allegra gioventù"	Massimiliano Pani	Alessandra Valeri Manera	Fivelandia 7	Hiatari Ryōkō!	
1989	"Evviva Palm Town"	Ninni Carucci	Alessandra Valeri Manera	Fivelandia 7	Maple Town	
1989	"Cristina"	Ninni Carucci	Alessandra Valeri Manera	Fivelandia 7	Cristina	
1989	"Ti voglio bene Denver"	Ninni Carucci	Alessandra Valeri Manera	Fivelandia 7	Denver, the Last Dinosaur	
1989	"Piccolo Lord"	Ninni Carucci	Alessandra Valeri Manera	Fivelandia 7	Little Lord Fauntleroy	
1989	"Conte Dacula"	Enzo Draghi	Alessandra Valeri Manera	Fivelandia 7	Count Duckula	
1989	"Ciao io sono Michael"	Enzo Draghi	Alessandra Valeri Manera	Fivelandia 7	What's Michael?	
1989	"I Puffi sanno"	Enzo Draghi	Alessandra Valeri Manera	Fivelandia 7	The Smurfs	
1989	"Dolce Candy"	Ninni Carucci	Alessandra Valeri Manera	Fivelandia 7	Candy Candy	
1989	"Teodoro e l'invenzione che non va"	Enzo Draghi	Alessandra Valeri Manera	Fivelandia 7	Wowser	
1989	"Sabato al circo"	Ninni Carucci	Alessandra Valeri Manera	Fivelandia 7	Sabato al circo	
1990	"Bobobobs"	Ninni Carucci	Alessandra Valeri Manera	Cristina D'Avena e i tuoi amici in TV 4	Bobobobs	
1990	"Alvin rock 'n' roll"	Ninni Carucci	Alessandra Valeri Manera	Cristina D'Avena e i tuoi amici in TV 4	Alvin and the Chipmunks	
1990	"Zero in condotta"	Ninni Carucci	Alessandra Valeri Manera	Cristina D'Avena e i tuoi amici in TV 4	The New Archies	
1990	"Un mondo di magia"	Massimiliano Pani	Alessandra Valeri Manera	Cristina D'Avena e i tuoi amici in TV 4	Second anime series of Himitsu no Akko-chan	
1990	"Le avventure di Teddy Rupxin"	Ninni Carucci	Alessandra Valeri Manera	Fivelandia 8	The Adventures of Teddy Ruxpin	
1990	"Cri Cri"	Ninni Carucci	Alessandra Valeri Manera	Fivelandia 8	Cri Cri	
1990	"Al circo, al circo"	Ninni Carucci	Alessandra Valeri Manera	Fivelandia 8	Sabato al circo	
1990	"Niente paura, c'è Alfred!"	Ninni Carucci	Alessandra Valeri Manera	Fivelandia 8	Alfred J. Kwak	
1990	"Amici Puffi"	Enzo Draghi	Alessandra Valeri Manera	Fivelandia 8	The Smurfs	
1990	"Dinosaucers"	Ninni Carucci	Alessandra Valeri Manera	Fivelandia 8	Dinosaucers	
1990	"Grande, piccolo Magoo"	Enzo Draghi	Alessandra Valeri Manera	Fivelandia 8	Mr. Magoo	
1990	"Jenny, Jenny"	Enzo Draghi	Alessandra Valeri Manera	Fivelandia 8	Aim for the Ace!	
1990	"Una spada per Lady Oscar"	Ninni Carucci	Alessandra Valeri Manera	Cantiamo con Cristina. Che avventura!	The Rose of Versailles	
1990	"Super Mario"	Massimiliano Pani	Alessandra Valeri Manera	Fivelandia 8	The Adventures of Super Mario Bros. 3	
1991	"Peter Pan"	Ninni Carucci	Alessandra Valeri Manera	Cristina D'Avena e i tuoi amici in TV 5	The Adventures of Peter Pan	
1991	"Papà Gambalunga"	Ninni Carucci	Alessandra Valeri Manera	Cristina D'Avena e i tuoi amici in TV 5	My Daddy Long Legs	
1991	"Il mistero della pietra azzurra"	Ninni Carucci	Alessandra Valeri Manera	Cristina D'Avena e i tuoi amici in TV 5	Nadia: The Secret of Blue Water	
1991	"Benvenuta Gigì"	Ninni Carucci	Alessandra Valeri Manera	Cristina D'Avena e i tuoi amici in TV 5	Magical Princess Minky Momo	
1991	"Conosciamoci un po'"	Massimiliano Pani	Alessandra Valeri Manera	Cristina D'Avena e i tuoi amici in TV 5	Once Upon a Time... Man	
1991	"Pippo e Menelao"	Enzo Draghi	Alessandra Valeri Manera	Cristina D'Avena e i tuoi amici in TV 5	Spiff and Hercules	
1991	"I tenerissimi"	Ninni Carucci	Alessandra Valeri Manera	Cristina D'Avena e i tuoi amici in TV 5	I tenerissimi	
1991	"Un regno incantato per Zelda"	Ninni Carucci	Alessandra Valeri Manera	Cristina D'Avena e i tuoi amici in TV 5	The Legend of Zelda	
1991	"Scuola di polizia"	Ninni Carucci	Alessandra Valeri Manera	Cristina D'Avena e i tuoi amici in TV 5	Police Academy: The Animated Series	
1991	"Bonjour Marianne"	Ninni Carucci	Alessandra Valeri Manera	Fivelandia 10	Marianne 1ère	
1991	"Bravo Molière"	Massimiliano Pani	Alessandra Valeri Manera	Fivelandia 9	Molierissimo	
1991	"Ciao Sabrina"	Piero Cassano and Paolo Marino	Alessandra Valeri Manera	Fivelandia 9	Idol Densetsu Eriko	
1991	"D'Artacan"	Enzo Draghi	Alessandra Valeri Manera	Fivelandia 9	Dogtanian and the Three Muskehounds	
1991	"Diventeremo famose"	Ninni Carucci	Alessandra Valeri Manera	Fivelandia 10	Idol Angel Yokoso Yoko	
1991	"Dolceluna"	Piero Cassano and Paolo Marino	Alessandra Valeri Manera	Fivelandia 9	Magical Angel Sweet Mint	
1991	"L'Europa siamo noi"	Ninni Carucci	Alessandra Valeri Manera	Fivelandia 9	Cristina, l'Europa siamo noi (opening theme)	
1991	"Il libro della giungla"	Ninni Carucci	Alessandra Valeri Manera	Fivelandia 9	Jungle Book Shōnen Mowgli	
1991	"Luna Party"	Ninni Carucci	Alessandra Valeri Manera	Fivelandia 9	Luna Party	With Gerry Scotti
1991	"Mille luci nel bosco"	Ninni Carucci	Alessandra Valeri Manera	Fivelandia 9	The Glo Friends	
1991	"I nonni ascoltano"	Ninni Carucci	Alessandra Valeri Manera	Fivelandia 9	Cristina, l'Europa siamo noi (closing theme)	
1991	"Robin Hood"	Ninni Carucci	Alessandra Valeri Manera	Fivelandia 10	Robin Hood	
1991	"Siamo tutti equilibristi"	Claudio Mattone		Cristina D'Avena e i tuoi amici in TV 20	Sabato al circo	With Gerry Scotti
1992	"Gemelli nel segno del destino"	Ninni Carucci	Alessandra Valeri Manera	Cristina D'Avena e i tuoi amici in TV 6	The Twins of Destiny	
1992	"James Bond Junior"	Ninni Carucci	Alessandra Valeri Manera	Cristina D'Avena e i tuoi amici in TV 6	James Bond Jr.	
1992	"Bentornato Topo Gigio"	Ninni Carucci	Alessandra Valeri Manera	Fivelandia 10	Topo Gigio	
1992	"Cantiamo con Cristina"	"Ninni Carucci"	Alessandra Valeri Manera	Fivelandia 10	Cantiamo con Cristina	
1992	"C.O.P.S. Squadra anticrimine"	Ninni Carucci	Alessandra Valeri Manera	Fivelandia 10	COPS	
1992	"Che papà Braccio di Ferro!"	Ninni Carucci	Alessandra Valeri Manera	Fivelandia 10	Popeye and Son	
1992	"Com'è grande l'America"	Ninni Carucci	Alessandra Valeri Manera	Fivelandia 10	A Thousand and One... Americas	
1992	"Cristoforo Colombo"	Ninni Carucci	Alessandra Valeri Manera	Fivelandia 10	Bōkensha －THE MAN WAS FROM SPAIN－	
1992	"Forza campioni"	Ninni Carucci	Alessandra Valeri Manera	Fivelandia 10	Ashita he Free Kick	
1992	"Il mio amico Huck"	Ninni Carucci	Alessandra Valeri Manera	Fivelandia 10	Huckleberry Finn Monogatari	
1992	"Michel Vaillant: tute, caschi e velocità"	Ninni Carucci	Alessandra Valeri Manera	Fivelandia 10	Michel Vaillant	
1992	"Il ritorno di D'Artacan"	Ninni Carucci	Alessandra Valeri Manera	Fivelandia 10	The Return of Dogtanian	
1992	"Tutti in scena con Melody"	Ninni Carucci	Alessandra Valeri Manera	Fivelandia 10	Maxie's World	
1993	"A tutto goal"	Fabrizio Baldoni	Alessandra Valeri Manera	Fivelandia 11	Moero! Top Striker	
1993	"Batman"	Ninni Carucci	Alessandra Valeri Manera	Fivelandia 11	Batman: The Animated Series	
1993	"Il gatto con gli stivali"	Ninni Carucci	Alessandra Valeri Manera	Fivelandia 11	Fantasy Adventure: Nagagutsu wo Haita Neko no Bouken	
1993	"L'isola del corallo"	Ninni Carucci	Alessandra Valeri Manera	Fivelandia 11	Tanken gobrin tou	
1993	"L'ispettore Gadget"	Ninni Carucci	Alessandra Valeri Manera	Fivelandia 11	Inspector Gadget	
1993	"Mary e il giardino dei misteri"	Paolo Marino and Gino De Stefani	Alessandra Valeri Manera	Fivelandia 11	Anime Himitsu no Hanazono	
1993	"I mille colori dell'allegria"	Ninni Carucci	Alessandra Valeri Manera	Fivelandia 11	The Raccoons	
1993	"Gli orsetti del cuore"	Ninni Carucci	Alessandra Valeri Manera	Fivelandia 11	The Care Bears	
1993	"Principe Valiant"	Ninni Carucci	Alessandra Valeri Manera	Fivelandia 11	The Legend of Prince Valiant	
1993	"Riscopriamo le Americhe"	Ninni Carucci	Alessandra Valeri Manera	Fivelandia 11	Once Upon a Time... The Americas	
1993	"Tazmania"	Ninni Carucci	Alessandra Valeri Manera	Fivelandia 11	Taz-Mania	
1993	"Widget: un alieno per amico"	Ninni Carucci	Alessandra Valeri Manera	Fivelandia 11	Widget	
1993	"Moominland, un mondo di serenità"	Enzo Draghi	Alessandra Valeri Manera	Cristina D'Avena e i tuoi amici in TV 7	Moomin	
1993	"Una scuola per cambiare"	Enzo Draghi	Alessandra Valeri Manera	Cristina D'Avena e i tuoi amici in TV 7	The Twins at St. Clare's	
1993	"Una sirenetta innamorata"	Ninni Carucci	Alessandra Valeri Manera	Cristina D'Avena e i tuoi amici in TV 7'	Adventures of the Little Mermaid	
1993	"Sophie e Vivianne: due sorelle e un'avventura"	Ninni Carucci	Alessandra Valeri Manera	Cristina D'Avena e i tuoi amici in TV 7	Sophie et Virginie	
1994	"Cantiamo insieme"	Ninni Carucci	Alessandra Valeri Manera	Cristina D'Avena e i tuoi amici in TV 7	Trapp Family Story	
1994	"80 sogni per viaggiare"	Ninni Carucci	Alessandra Valeri Manera	Fivelandia 12	Saban's Around the World in Eighty Dreams	
1994	"All'arrembaggio Sandokan!"	Ninni Carucci	Alessandra Valeri Manera	Fivelandia 12	Sandokan	
1994	"Biancaneve"	Ninni Carucci	Alessandra Valeri Manera	Fivelandia 12	The Legend of Snow White	
1994	"Una classe di monelli per Jo"	Valeriano Chiaravalle	Alessandra Valeri Manera	Fivelandia 12	Little Women II: Jo's Boys	
1994	"Un complotto tra le onde del mare"	Ninni Carucci	Alessandra Valeri Manera	Fivelandia 12	Journey to the Heart of the World	
1994	"Fiocchi di cotone per Jeanie"	Ninni Carucci	Alessandra Valeri Manera	Fivelandia 12	Jeanie with the Light Brown Hair	
1994	"Martina e il campanello misterioso"	Enzo Draghi	Alessandra Valeri Manera	Fivelandia 12	Mami the Psychic	
1994	"L'isola della piccola Flo"	Enzo Draghi	Alessandra Valeri Manera	Fivelandia 12	The Swiss Family Robinson: Flone of the Mysterious Island	
1994	"Spank, tenero rubacuori"	Mario Pagano	Alessandra Valeri Manera	Fivelandia 12	Ohayō! Spank	
1994	"Sonic"	Ninni Carucci	Alessandra Valeri Manera	Fivelandia 12	Adventures of Sonic the Hedgehog and Sonic the Hedgehog	
1994	"Zorro"	Ninni Carucci	Alessandra Valeri Manera	Cristina D'Avena e i tuoi amici in TV 8	The Legend of Zorro	
1994	"Le voci della savana"	Ninni Carucci	Alessandra Valeri Manera	Fivelandia 12	The Bush Baby	
1994	"Un videogioco per Kevin"	Enzo Draghi	Alessandra Valeri Manera	Fivelandia 12	Captain N: The Game Master	
1994	"Le fiabe più belle"	Silvio Amato	Alessandra Valeri Manera	Cristina D'Avena e i tuoi amici in TV 8	Anime Sekai no Dowa	
1994	"Grandi uomini per grandi idee"	Ninni Carucci	Alessandra Valeri Manera	Cristina D'Avena e i tuoi amici in TV 8	Once Upon a Time... The Discoverers	
1994	"Junior, pianta mordicchiosa"	Chicco Santulli	Alessandra Valeri Manera	Cristina D'Avena e i tuoi amici in TV 8	Little Shop	
1995	"Sailor Moon"	Ninni Carucci	Alessandra Valeri Manera	Cristina D'Avena e i tuoi amici in TV 8	Sailor Moon	
1995	"I viaggi di Gulliver"	Silvio Amato	Alessandra Valeri Manera	Cristina D'Avena e i tuoi amici in TV 8	Saban Gulliver's Travels	
1995	"Brividi e polvere con Pelleossa"	Ninni Carucci	Alessandra Valeri Manera	Fivelandia 13	Tales from the Cryptkeeper	
1995	"Che campioni Holly e Benji!!!"	Silvio Amato	Alessandra Valeri Manera	Fivelandia 13	Captain Tsubasa	With Marco Destro
1995	"Chiudi gli occhi e sogna"	Silvio Amato	Alessandra Valeri Manera	Fivelandia 13	Little Rosey	
1995	"Mimì e la nazionale di pallavolo"	Valeriano Chiaravalle	Alessandra Valeri Manera	Fivelandia 13	Attack No. 1	
1995	"Mostri o non mostri... tutti a scuola"	Silvio Amato	Alessandra Valeri Manera	Fivelandia 13	Gravedale High	
1995	"Sailor Moon, la Luna splende"	Ninni Carucci	Alessandra Valeri Manera	Fivelandia 13	Sailor Moon R	
1995	"I segreti dell'isola misteriosa"	Silvio Amato	Alessandra Valeri Manera	Fivelandia 13	Jura Tripper	
1995	"Ann e Andy, due buffi amici di pezza"	Silvio Amato	Alessandra Valeri Manera	Cristina D'Avena e i tuoi amici in TV 9	The Adventures of Raggedy Ann and Andy	
1995	"Belle e Sebastien"	Ninni Carucci	Alessandra Valeri Manera	Cristina D'Avena e i tuoi amici in TV 9	Belle and Sebastian	
1995	"Che magnifico campeggio!"	Enzo Draghi	Alessandra Valeri Manera	Cristina D'Avena e i tuoi amici in TV 9	Camp Candy	
1995	"Chi viene in viaggio con me?"	Ninni Carucci	Alessandra Valeri Manera	Cristina D'Avena e i tuoi amici in TV 9	Around the World with Willy Fog	
1995	"Mighty Max"	Valeriano Chiaravalle	Alessandra Valeri Manera	Cristina D'Avena e i tuoi amici in TV 9	Mighty Max	
1995	"Ruy, il piccolo Cid"	Silvio Amato	Alessandra Valeri Manera	Cristina D'Avena e i tuoi amici in TV 9	Ruy, the Little Cid	
1995	"Mary Bell"	Ninni Carucci	Alessandra Valeri Manera	Cristina D'Avena e i tuoi amici in TV 10	Floral Magician Mary Bell	
1995	"Noddy"	Enzo Draghi	Alessandra Valeri Manera	Cristina D'Avena e i tuoi amici in TV 10	Noddy's Toyland Adventures	
1995	"Tanto tempo fa Gigì"	Enzo Draghi	Alessandra Valeri Manera	Cristina D'Avena e i tuoi amici in TV 2004	Magical Princess Minky Momo: Hold on to Your Dreams	
1995	"Allacciate le cinture, viaggiando si impara!"	Franco Fasano	Alessandra Valeri Manera	Cristina D'Avena e i tuoi amici in TV 9	The Magic School Bus	
1995	"Alla ricerca del cristallo arcobaleno"	Ninni Carucci	Alessandra Valeri Manera	Fivelandia 22	The Wonderful Galaxy of Oz	
1995	"Fiabissime"	Valeriano Chiaravalle	Alessandra Valeri Manera	Cristina D'Avena e i tuoi amici in TV 18	Anime Sekai no Dowa (VHS edition)	
1995	"Tante fiabe nel cassetto"	Enzo Draghi	Alessandra Valeri Manera	30 e poi... Parte prima	The World of Peter Rabbit and Friends	
1995	"Cinque amici sottosopra"	Ninni Carucci	Alessandra Valeri Manera	40 - Il sogno continua	Garbage Pail Kids	
1995	"Parola d'ordine, arriviamo!"	Ninni Carucci	Alessandra Valeri Manera	40 - Il sogno continua	Dinky Di's	
1996	"Sailor Moon e il cristallo del cuore"	Ninni Carucci	Alessandra Valeri Manera	Cristina D'Avena e i tuoi amici in TV 9	Sailor Moon S	
1996	"Tutti in viaggio verso Pandalandia"	Silvio Amato	Alessandra Valeri Manera	Cristina D'Avena e i tuoi amici in TV 9	Jin Jin and the Panda Patrol	
1996	"Calimero"	Franco Fasano	Alessandra Valeri Manera	Fivelandia 14	Calimero	
1996	"Cucciolandia"	Silvio Amato	Alessandra Valeri Manera	Fivelandia 14	Littlest Pet Shop	
1996	"È un po' magia per Terry e Maggie"	Valeriano Chiaravalle	Alessandra Valeri Manera	Fivelandia 14	Miracle Girls	
1996	"I fantastici viaggi di Fiorellino"	Enzo Draghi	Alessandra Valeri Manera	Fivelandia 14	Honey Honey no Suteki na Bouken	
1996	"Un fiocco per sognare, un fiocco per cambiare"	Franco Fasano	Alessandra Valeri Manera	Fivelandia 14	Hime-chan's Ribbon	
1996	"Un oceano di avventure"	Franco Fasano	Alessandra Valeri Manera	Fivelandia 14	Tico of the Seven Seas	
1996	"Un regno magico per Sally"	Silvio Amato	Alessandra Valeri Manera	Fivelandia 14	Mahōtsukai Sarī 2	
1996	"Pollicina"	Silvio Amato	Alessandra Valeri Manera	Fivelandia 14	Thumbelina: A Magical Story	
1996	"Puffa un po' di arcobaleno"	Silvio Amato	Alessandra Valeri Manera	Fivelandia 14	The Smurfs	
1996	"Sailor Moon e il mistero dei sogni"	Piero Cassano	Alessandra Valeri Manera	Fivelandia 14	Sailor Moon SuperS	
1996	"The Mask"	Piero Cassano and Max Longhi	Alessandra Valeri Manera	Fivelandia 14	The Mask: Animated Series	
1996	"C'era una volta"	Ninni Carucci	Alessandra Valeri Manera	Cristina D'Avena e i tuoi amici in TV 10	Sekai Dōwa Anime Zenshū	
1996	"Chi la fa l'aspetti!"	Franco Fasano	Alessandra Valeri Manera	Cristina D'Avena e i tuoi amici in TV 10	Iznogoud	
1996	"Pennelate di poesia per Madeline"	Silvio Amato	Alessandra Valeri Manera	Cristina D'Avena e i tuoi amici in TV 10	Madeline	
1996	"Peter e Isa: un amore sulla neve"	Vince Tempera	Alessandra Valeri Manera	Cristina D'Avena e i tuoi amici in TV 12	Pierre et Isa	
1996	"Cupido"	Chicco Santulli	Alessandra Valeri Manera	30 e poi... Parte seconda	Cupido	
1996	"Quattro amici per una missione intorno al mondo"	Enzo Draghi	Alessandra Valeri Manera	40 - Il sogno continua	Die Bambus-Bären-Bande	
1997	"Alé alé alé o-o"	Franco Fasano	Alessandra Valeri Manera	Cristina D'Avena e i tuoi amici in TV 10	Aoki Densetsu Shoot!	
1997	"Lisa e Seya un solo cuore per lo stesso segreto"	Franco Fasano	Alessandra Valeri Manera	Cristina D'Avena e i tuoi amici in TV 10	Saint Tail	
1997	"Petali di stelle per Sailor Moon"	Piero Cassano	Alessandra Valeri Manera	Cristina D'Avena e i tuoi amici in TV 10	Sailor Moon Sailor Stars	
1997	"Piccoli problemi di cuore"	Franco Fasano	Alessandra Valeri Manera	Cristina D'Avena e i tuoi amici in TV 10	Marmalade Boy	
1997	"Barney"	Franco Fasano	Alessandra Valeri Manera"	Fivelandia 15	Barney & Friends	
1997	"Cenerentola"	Silvio Amato	Alessandra Valeri Manera	Fivelandia 15	The Story of Cinderella	
1997	"Un incantesimo dischiuso tra i petali del tempo"	Franco Fasano	Alessandra Valeri Manera	Fivelandia 15	Slayers, Slayers NEXT and Slayers TRY	
1997	"L'isola del tesoro"	Franco Fasano	Alessandra Valeri Manera	Fivelandia 15	The Legends of Treasure Island	
1997	"Le magiche ballerine volanti"	Silvio Amato	Alessandra Valeri Manera	Fivelandia 15	Sky Dancers	
1997	"Mille note di allegria con la Mozart Band"	Silvio Amato	Alessandra Valeri Manera	Fivelandia 15	The Mozart Band	
1997	"Mortadello e Polpetta: la coppia che scoppia"	Franco Fasano	Alessandra Valeri Manera	Fivelandia 15	Mortadelo y Filemón	
1997	"Notizie da prima pagina"	Franco Fasano	Alessandra Valeri Manera	Fivelandia 15	Spirou et Fantasio	
1997	"Pazze risate per mostri e vampiri"	Enzo Draghi	Alessandra Valeri Manera	Fivelandia 15	Dr. Zitbag's Transylvania Pet Shop	
1997	"Simba: è nato un re"	Franco Fasano	Alessandra Valeri Manera	Fivelandia 15	Simba: è nato un re	
1997	"Spicchi di cielo tra baffi di fumo"	Franco Fasano	Alessandra Valeri Manera	Fivelandia 15	Romeo's Blue Skies	
1997	"Beethoven"	Franco Fasano	Alessandra Valeri Manera	Cristina D'Avena e i tuoi amici in TV 11	Beethoven	
1997	"Girovagando nel passato"	Enzo Draghi	Alessandra Valeri Manera	Cristina D'Avena e i tuoi amici in TV 11	A.J.'s Time Travelers	
1997	"Nel covo dei pirati con Peter Pan"	Franco Fasano	Alessandra Valeri Manera	Cristina D'Avena e i tuoi amici in TV 11	Fox's Peter Pan & the Pirates	
1997	"Un passo dopo l'altro sulle strade di Gesù"	Silvio Amato	Alessandra Valeri Manera	Cristina D'Avena e i tuoi amici in TV 11	The Story Keepers	
1997	"Caccia al tesoro con Montana"	Franco Fasano	Alessandra Valeri Manera	Fivelandia 16	Montana Jones	
1997	"Un uragano di goal"	Silvio Amato	Alessandra Valeri Manera	Cristina D'Avena e i tuoi amici in TV 12	Hurricanes	
1997	Dabadabady Casper	Enzo Draghi	Alessandra Valeri Manera	Fivelandia 21	Casper the Friendly Ghost	
1997	"Trucchi, magie e illusioni per una giovane principessa"	Enzo Draghi	Alessandra Valeri Manera	Principi e principesse	Tenko and the Guardians of the Magic	
1998	"Ace Ventura"	Franco Fasano	Alessandra Valeri Manera	Cristina D'Avena e i tuoi amici in TV 11	Ace Ventura: Pet Detective	
1998	"I fantastici viaggi di Sinbad"	Franco Fasano	Alessandra Valeri Manera	Cristina D'Avena e i tuoi amici in TV 11	The Fantastic Voyages of Sinbad the Sailor	
1998	"Giù la maschera duca Filippo"	Franco Fasano	Alessandra Valeri Manera	Cristina D'Avena e i tuoi amici in TV 11	Fantomcat	
1998	"Space Goofs: vicini, troppo vicini"	Silvio Amato	Alessandra Valeri Manera	Cristina D'Avena e i tuoi amici in TV 11	Space Goofs	
1998	"Tra le onde del lago incantato"	Franco Fasano	Alessandra Valeri Manera	Cristina D'Avena e i tuoi amici in TV 11	Happy Ness: The Secret of the Loch	
1998	"Un alveare di avventure per l'ape Magà"	Silvio Amato	Alessandra Valeri Manera	Fivelandia 16	Honeybee Hutch	
1998	"Col vento in poppa verso l'avventura"	Franco Fasano	Alessandra Valeri Manera	Fivelandia 16	Sea Dogs	
1998	"Curiosando nei cortili del cuore"	Franco Fasano	Alessandra Valeri Manera	Fivelandia 16	Neighborhood Story	
1998	"È piccolo, è bionico, è sempre Gadget"	Silvio Amato	Alessandra Valeri Manera	Fivelandia 16	Gadget Boy & Heather	
1998	"Pippi hurrà"	Franco Fasano	Alessandra Valeri Manera	Fivelandia 16	Pippi Longstocking	
1998	"Robinson Bignè"	Silvio Amato	Alessandra Valeri Manera	Fivelandia 16	Robinson Sucroe	
1998	"Scodinzola la vita e abbaia l'avventura con Oliver"	Franco Fasano	Alessandra Valeri Manera	Fivelandia 16	Saban's Adventures of Oliver Twist	
1998	"Yoghi, salsa e merende"	Franco Fasano	Alessandra Valeri Manera	Fivelandia 16	The New Yogi Bear Show	
1998	"Alf"	Franco Fasano	Alessandra Valeri Manera	Cristina D'Avena e i tuoi amici in TV 12	ALF: The Animated Series	
1998	"Indagini a quattro zampe"	Silvio Amato	Alessandra Valeri Manera	30 e poi... Parte seconda	Dog Tracer	
1998	"Mare, sole e... Costa"	Enzo Draghi	Alessandra Valeri Manera	30 e poi... Parte seconda	Costa	
1999	"Ascolta sempre il cuore Remì"	Franco Fasano	Alessandra Valeri Manera	Cristina D'Avena e i tuoi amici in TV 12	Nobody's Boy: Remi	
1999	"Bad dog: un cane che più cane non c'è"	Franco Fasano	Alessandra Valeri Manera	Cristina D'Avena e i tuoi amici in TV 12	Bad Dog	
1999	"Imbarchiamoci per un grande viaggio"	Max Longhi and Giorgio Vanni	Alessandra Valeri Manera	Cristina D'Avena e i tuoi amici in TV 12	Once Upon a Time... The Explorers	
1999	"In che mondo stai Beetlejuice?"	Enzo Draghi	Alessandra Valeri Manera	Cristina D'Avena e i tuoi amici in TV 12	Beetlejuice	
1999	"Sale e Pepe"	Franco Fasano	Alessandra Valeri Manera	Cristina D'Avena e i tuoi amici in TV 12	Les Jules, chienne de vie...	
1999	"Una giungla di avventure per Kimba"	Max Longhi and Giorgio Vanni	Alessandra Valeri Manera	Fivelandia 1999	Kimba the White Lion	
1999	"Hello Sandybell"	Max Longhi and Giorgio Vanni	Alessandra Valeri Manera	Fivelandia 1999	Hello! Sandybell	
1999	"Il laboratorio di Dexter"	Franco Fasano	Alessandra Valeri Manera	Fivelandia 1999	Dexter's Laboratory	
1999	"Il mondo incantato dei Pocket Dragons"	Silvio Amato	Alessandra Valeri Manera	Fivelandia 1999	Pocket Dragon Adventures	
1999	"Molla l'osso Briscola"	Silvio Amato	Alessandra Valeri Manera	Fivelandia 1999	What-a-Mess	
1999	"Pesca la tua carta Sakura"	Franco Fasano	Alessandra Valeri Manera	Fivelandia 1999	Cardcaptor Sakura	
1999	"Tex Avery Show"	Franco Fasano	Alessandra Valeri Manera	Fivelandia 1999	The Wacky World of Tex Avery	
1999	"Un tritone per amico"	Franco Fasano	Alessandra Valeri Manera	Fivelandia 1999	Ned's Newt	
1999	"Anatole"	Franco Fasano	Alessandra Valeri Manera	Cristina D'Avena e i tuoi amici in TV 13	Anatole	
1999	"Un fiume di avventure con Huck"	Franco Fasano	Alessandra Valeri Manera	Cristina D'Avena e i tuoi amici in TV 13	Huckleberry no Bōken	
1999	"Oscar e le sette note perdute"	Silvio Amato	Alessandra Valeri Manera	Cristina D'Avena e i tuoi amici in TV 13	Oscar's Orchestra	
1999	"Mille emozioni tra le pagine del destino per Marie-Yvonne"	Max Longhi and Giorgio Vanni	Alessandra Valeri Manera	Fivelandia 22	Boys Over Flowers	
1999	"Starla e le sette gemme del mistero"	Silvio Amato	Alessandra Valeri Manera	Cristina D'Avena e i tuoi amici in TV 18	Princess Gwenevere and the Jewel Riders	
1999	"Cupido pizzicacuori"	Silvio Amato	Alessandra Valeri Manera	Cristina D'Avena e i tuoi amici in TV 21	Bit the Cupid	
1999	"Un vagone di desideri e un'ondata di guai per Nick"	Enzo Draghi	Alessandra Valeri Manera	30 e poi... - Parte prima	Wish Kid	
1999	"Nel tunnel dei misteri con Nancy Drew e gli Hardy Boys"	Enzo Draghi	Alessandra Valeri Manera	30 e poi... Parte seconda	The Hardy Boys/Nancy Drew Mysteries	
2000	"Anthony formidabile formica"	Franco Fasano	Alessandra Valeri Manera	Cristina D'Avena e i tuoi amici in TV 13	Anthony Ant	
2000	"Emily e Alexander: che tipi questi topi"	Max Longhi and Giorgio Vanni	Alessandra Valeri Manera	Cristina D'Avena e i tuoi amici in TV 13	The Country Mouse and the City Mouse Adventures	
2000	"Il parco di Giacomo"	Silvio Amato	Alessandra Valeri Manera	Cristina D'Avena e i tuoi amici in TV 13	Percy the Park Keeper	
2000	"Qua la zampa Doggie"	Silvio Amato	Alessandra Valeri Manera	Cristina D'Avena e i tuoi amici in TV 13	Family Dog	
2000	"Sabrina"	Max Longhi and Giorgio Vanni	Alessandra Valeri Manera	Cristina D'Avena e i tuoi amici in TV 13	Sabrina: The Animated Series	
2000	"Ai confini dell'universo"	Max Longhi and Giorgio Vanni	Alessandra Valeri Manera	Fivelandia 18	Once Upon a Time... Space	
2000	"Fantaghirò"	Franco Fasano	Alessandra Valeri Manera	Fivelandia 18	Fantaghirò	
2000	"Una foresta incantata per Katia e Carletto"	Silvio Amato	Alessandra Valeri Manera	Fivelandia 18	Kit & Kaboodle	
2000	"Pepin, un piccolo eroe per una grande leggenda"	Franco Fasano	Alessandra Valeri Manera	Fivelandia 18	Les mille et une prouesses de Pépin Troispommes	
2000	"Terra, cielo e mare: un mondo da esplorare con Dodo"	Silvio Amato	Alessandra Valeri Manera	40 - Il sogno continua	CyberDodo (never aired)	
2000	"Picchiarello"	Max Longhi and Giorgio Vanni	Alessandra Valeri Manera	Fivelandia 18	The New Woody Woodpecker Show	
2000	"Pocahontas"	Franco Fasano	Alessandra Valeri Manera	Fivelandia 18	Pocahontas	
2000	"Un mostro tutto da ridere"	Franco Fasano	Alessandra Valeri Manera	Fivelandia 18	My Pet Monster	
2000	"Rossana"	Franco Fasano	Alessandra Valeri Manera	Fivelandia 18	Kodocha	With Giorgio Vanni
2000	"Si salvi chi può! Arriva Dennis"	Enzo Draghi	Alessandra Valeri Manera	Fivelandia 18	Dennis and Gnasher	
2000	"Stilly e lo specchio magico"	Franco Fasano	Alessandra Valeri Manera	Fivelandia 18	Third anime series of Himitsu no Akko-chan	
2000	"Temi d'amore fra i banchi di scuola"	Franco Fasano	Alessandra Valeri Manera	Fivelandia 18	Mizuiro Jidai	
2000	"Tiritere e ghirigori per due topi in mezzo ai fiori"	Max Longhi and Giorgio Vanni	Alessandra Valeri Manera	Fivelandia 18	Little Mouse on the Prairie	
2000	"Il gatto col cappello"	Silvio Amato	Alessandra Valeri Manera	Cristina D'Avena e i tuoi amici in TV 14	The Wubbulous World of Dr. Seuss	
2000	"I tanti segreti di un cuore innamorato"	Franco Fasano	Alessandra Valeri Manera	Fivelandia 19	Wedding Peach	
2000	"Kipper"	Silvio Amato	Alessandra Valeri Manera	Cristina D'Avena e i tuoi amici in TV 18	Kipper	
2001	"Always Pokémon"	Max Longhi and Giorgio Vanni	Alessandra Valeri Manera	Cristina D'Avena e i tuoi amici in TV 14	Pokémon	With Giorgio Vanni
2001	"Marsupilami"	Franco Fasano	Alessandra Valeri Manera	Cristina D'Avena e i tuoi amici in TV 14	Marsupliami	
2001	"Papyrus e i misteri del Nilo"	Franco Fasano	Alessandra Valeri Manera	Cristina D'Avena e i tuoi amici in TV 14	Papyrus	
2001	"Pirati si nasce"	Franco Fasano	Alessandra Valeri Manera	Cristina D'Avena e i tuoi amici in TV 14	Famille Pirate	
2001	"Sakura la partita non è finita"	Franco Fasano	Alessandra Valeri Manera	Cristina D'Avena e i tuoi amici in TV 14	Cardcaptor Sakura	
2001	"Super Elvis la stella del rock"	Max Longhi and Giorgio Vanni	Alessandra Valeri Manera	Cristina D'Avena e i tuoi amici in TV 14	Li'l Elvis and the Truckstoppers	
2001	"Ughetto cane perfetto"	Franco Fasano	Alessandra Valeri Manera	Cristina D'Avena e i tuoi amici in TV 14	Underdog	
2001	"What a Mess Slump e Arale"	Max Longhi and Giorgio Vanni	Alessandra Valeri Manera	Cristina D'Avena e i tuoi amici in TV 14	Doctor Slump and Dr. Slump - Arale-chan	With Giorgio Vanni
2001	"All'arrembaggio!"	Max Longhi and Giorgio Vanni	Alessandra Valeri Manera	Fivelandia 19	One Piece	
2001	"Arriva Paddington!"	Max Longhi and Giorgio Vanni	Alessandra Valeri Manera	Fivelandia 19	The Adventures of Paddington Bear	
2001	"Carnaby Street"	Max Longhi and Giorgio Vanni	Alessandra Valeri Manera	Fivelandia 19	Carnaby Street	
2001	"Che baby-sitter questa mummia!"	Max Longhi and Giorgio Vanni	Alessandra Valeri Manera	Fivelandia 19	Mummy Nanny	
2001	"Fancy Lala"	Max Longhi and Giorgio Vanni	Alessandra Valeri Manera	Fivelandia 19	Fancy Lala	
2001	"Luna, principessa argentata"	Franco Fasano	Alessandra Valeri Manera	Fivelandia 19	Yume no Crayon Oukoku	
2001	"Milly, vampiro per gioco"	Franco Fasano	Alessandra Valeri Manera	Fivelandia 19	Mona the Vampire	
2001	"Mostruosi marziani"	Franco Fasano	Alessandra Valeri Manera	Fivelandia 19	Butt-Ugly Martians	
2001	"Netéb, la principessa del Nilo"	Max Longhi and Giorgio Vanni	Alessandra Valeri Manera	Fivelandia 19	La Princesse du Nil	
2001	"Pokémon, the Johto League Champions"	Max Longhi and Giorgio Vanni	Alessandra Valeri Manera	Fivelandia 19	Pokémon	With Giorgio Vanni
2001	"Roswell Conspiracies"	Max Longhi and Giorgio Vanni	Alessandra Valeri Manera	Fivelandia 19	Roswell Conspiracies: Aliens, Myths and Legends	With Giorgio Vanni
2001	"Spie, missioni e coccodrilli: S.O.S. Croco"	Franco Fasano	Alessandra Valeri Manera	Fivelandia 19	S.O.S. Croco (never aired)	
2001	"Supermodels"	Franco Fasano	Alessandra Valeri Manera	Fivelandia 19	Supermodels	
2001	"Magica Doremì"	Max Longhi and Giorgio Vanni	Alessandra Valeri Manera	Cristina D'Avena e i tuoi amici in TV 15	Ojamajo Doremi	
2002	"A scuola di magie"	Max Longhi and Giorgio Vanni	Alessandra Valeri Manera	Cristina D'Avena e i tuoi amici in TV 15	Ultimate Book of Spells	
2002	"Mack, ma che principe sei?"	Franco Fasano	Alessandra Valeri Manera	Cristina D'Avena e i tuoi amici in TV 15	Ojarumaru	
2002	"Vita da streghe"	Max Longhi and Giorgio Vanni	Alessandra Valeri Manera	Cristina D'Avena e i tuoi amici in TV 15	My grandma is a witch	
2002	"Flint, a spasso nel tempo"	Franco Fasano	Alessandra Valeri Manera	Fivelandia 20	Flint the Time Detective	
2002	"Hamtaro piccoli criceti grandi avventure"	Max Longhi and Giorgio Vanni	Alessandra Valeri Manera	Fivelandia 20	Hamtaro	
2002	"Ma che magie Doremì!"	Max Longhi and Giorgio Vanni	Alessandra Valeri Manera	Fivelandia 20	Ojamajo Doremi # and Ojamajo Doremi Dokka~n!	
2002	"Prezzemolo"	Franco Fasano	Alessandra Valeri Manera	Fivelandia 20	Prezzemolo	
2002	"Roba da gatti"	Max Longhi and Giorgio Vanni	Alessandra Valeri Manera	Fivelandia 20	Cyborg Kuro-chan	With Giorgio Vanni
2002	"Roma, un grande impero"	Franco Fasano	Alessandra Valeri Manera	Fivelandia 20	Les fils de Rome	
2002	"Tutti all'arrembaggio"	Max Longhi and Giorgio Vanni	Alessandra Valeri Manera	Fivelandia 20	One Piece	With Giorgio Vanni
2002	"Simsalagrimm"	Max Longhi and Giorgio Vanni	Alessandra Valeri Manera	Cristina D'Avena e i tuoi amici in TV 16	Simsala Grimm	
2003	"Angelina ballerina"	Max Longhi and Giorgio Vanni	Alessandra Valeri Manera	Cristina D'Avena e i tuoi amici in TV 16	Angelina Ballerina	
2003	"Che magnifiche spie!"	Max Longhi and Giorgio Vanni	Alessandra Valeri Manera	Cristina D'Avena e i tuoi amici in TV 16	Totally Spies!	
2003	"Doraemon"	Max Longhi and Giorgio Vanni	Alessandra Valeri Manera	Cristina D'Avena e i tuoi amici in TV 16	Doraemon (1979 anime) and Doraemon (2005 anime)	
2003	"Draghi e draghetti"	Max Longhi and Giorgio Vanni	Alessandra Valeri Manera	Cristina D'Avena e i tuoi amici in TV 16	Dragon Tales	
2003	"Maggie e l'incredibile Birba"	Antonio Galbiati	Alessandra Valeri Manera	Cristina D'Avena e i tuoi amici in TV 16	Maggie and the Ferocious Beast	
2003	"Un'avventura fantastica"	Antonio Galbiati	Alessandra Valeri Manera	Fivelandia 21	Forchun Kuesuto L	
2003	"Belfagor"	Antonio Galbiati	Alessandra Valeri Manera	Fivelandia 21	Belphégor	
2003	"Doredò Doremì"	Max Longhi and Giorgio Vanni	Alessandra Valeri Manera	Fivelandia 21	Mōtto! Ojamajo Doremi	
2003	"Gladiator's Academy"	Max Longhi and Giorgio Vanni	Alessandra Valeri Manera	Fivelandia 21	Gladiators Academy	
2003	"Una miss scacciafantasmi"	Max Longhi and Giorgio Vanni	Alessandra Valeri Manera	Fivelandia 21	Ghost Sweeper Mikami	
2003	"Pokémon: The Master Quest"	Max Longhi and Giorgio Vanni	Alessandra Valeri Manera	Fivelandia 21	Pokémon	With Giorgio Vanni
2003	"Quella strana fattoria"	Franco Fasano	Alessandra Valeri Manera	Fivelandia 21	Monster Farm	
2003	"Sherlock Holmes indagini dal futuro"	Cristiano Macrì	Alessandra Valeri Manera	Fivelandia 21	Sherlock Holmes in the 22nd Century	
2003	"Yui, ragazza virtuale"	Max Longhi and Giorgio Vanni	Alessandra Valeri Manera	Fivelandia 21	Corrector Yui	
2003	"Il ballo di Timidy e Sciarpina"	Franco Fasano	Alessandra Valeri Manera	Hamtaro piccoli criceti, grandi avventure	Hamtaro (closing theme)	
2003	"Hamtaro Ham Ham Friends"	Max Longhi and Giorgio Vanni	Alessandra Valeri Manera	Hamtaro piccoli criceti, grandi avventure	Hamtaro (opening theme)	
2003	"Il suo nome è Ghiotto"	Franco Fasano	Alessandra Valeri Manera	Hamtaro piccoli criceti, grandi avventure	Hamtaro (closing theme)	
2003	"Ma chi vincerà fra Tricky e Damerino"	Cristiano Macrì	Alessandra Valeri Manera	Hamtaro piccoli criceti, grandi avventure	Hamtaro (closing theme)	
2003	"Ninna nanna Ronfo"	Sergio Dall'Ora	Alessandra Valeri Manera	Hamtaro piccoli criceti, grandi avventure	Hamtaro (closing theme)	
2003	"Panda"	Silvio Amato	Alessandra Valeri Manera	Hamtaro piccoli criceti, grandi avventure	Hamtaro (closing theme)	
2003	"Piccola Bijou"	Max Longhi and Giorgio Vanni	Alessandra Valeri Manera	Hamtaro piccoli criceti, grandi avventure	Hamtaro (closing theme)	
2003	"Jim l'astroverme"	Silvio Amato	Alessandra Valeri Manera	#le sigle più belle	Earthworm Jim (never aired)	
2004	"Holly e Benji Forever"	Max Longhi and Giorgio Vanni	Alessandra Valeri Manera	Cartoon Story	Captain Tsubasa Road to 2002	With Giorgio Vanni
2004	"Mew Mew Amiche vincenti"	Cristiano Macrì	Alessandra Valeri Manera	Cristina D'Avena e i tuoi amici in TV 2004	Tokyo Mew Mew	
2004	"Pokémon Advanced"	Max Longhi and Giorgio Vanni	Alessandra Valeri Manera	Cristina D'Avena e i tuoi amici in TV 2004	Pokémon	With Giorgio Vanni
2004	"Gira il mondo principessa stellare"	Danilo Aielli and Maurizio Perfetto	Alessandra Valeri Manera	Cosmic Baton Girl Kometto-san	Fivelandia 22	
2004	"Webdivers"	Cristiano Macrì, Max Longhi and Giorgio Vanni	Riccardo Barberi and Luigi Vilardo	Fivelandia 22	Dennō Bōkenki Webdiver	With Cristiano Macrì
2004	"Kirby"	Max Longhi and Giorgio Vanni	Alessandra Valeri Manera	Cristina D'Avena e i tuoi amici in TV 19	Kirby: Right Back at Ya!	
2004	"Gadget e i Gadgettini"	Max Longhi and Giorgio Vanni	Alessandra Valeri Manera	Cristina for You	Gadget & the Gadgetinis	With Giorgio Vanni
2004	"Sagwa"	Max Longhi and Giorgio Vanni	Alessandra Valeri Manera	40 - Il sogno continua	Sagwa, the Chinese Siamese Cat	
2005	"Mirmo"	Max Longhi and Giorgio Vanni	Alessandra Valeri Manera	Mirmo	Mirmo!!	
2005	"Akubi Girl"	Max Longhi and Giorgio Vanni	Alessandra Valeri Manera	Cristina for You	Yobarete Tobidete! Akubi-chan	
2006	"Grog di Magog"	Max Longhi and Giorgio Vanni	Alessandra Valeri Manera	Cristina D'Avena e i tuoi amici in TV 19	Wunschpunsch	
2006	"Pokémon Advanced Battle"	Max Longhi and Giorgio Vanni	Alessandra Valeri Manera	Cristina D'Avena e i tuoi amici in TV 19	Pokémon	With Giorgio Vanni
2006	"Pokémon Chronicles"	Max Longhi and Giorgio Vanni	Alessandra Valeri Manera	Cristina D'Avena e i tuoi amici in TV 20	Pokémon Chronicles	With Giorgio Vanni
2006	"Le avventure di Piggley Winks"	Max Longhi and Giorgio Vanni	Alessandra Valeri Manera	Cristina D'Avena e i tuoi amici in TV 21	Jakers! The Adventures of Piggley Winks	
2006	"Faireez"	Danilo Bernardi and Giuseppe Zanca	Nuvola	Cristina D'Avena e i tuoi amici in TV 21	Faireez	
2007	"Dolce piccola Remì"	Silvio Amato	Cristina D'Avena	Cristina D'Avena e i tuoi amici in TV 20	Remi, Nobody's Girl	
2007	"Hamtaro"	Max Longhi and Giorgio Vanni	Alessandra Valeri Manera	Cristina D'Avena e i tuoi amici in TV 21	Hamtaro	
2007	"Pirati all'arrembaggio"	Antonio D'Ambrosio	Nuvola	Cristina D'Avena e i tuoi amici in TV 21	One Piece	With Antonio Divincenzo
2007	"Wonder Bevil"	Max Longhi and Giorgio Vanni	Alessandra Valeri Manera	Cristina D'Avena e i tuoi amici in TV 21	Wonder Bebil-kun	
2007	"Zip e Zap"	Max Longhi and Giorgio Vanni	Alessandra Valeri Manera	Cristina D'Avena e i tuoi amici in TV 21	Zipi y Zape	With Giorgio Vanni
2007	"Pokémon Diamante e Perla"	Max Longhi and Giorgio Vanni	Alessandra Valeri Manera	Pokémon Compilation	Pokémon	With Giorgio Vanni
2007	"Prince of Tennis"	Max Longhi and Giorgio Vanni	Alessandra Valeri Manera	Cristina for You	The Prince of Tennis	
2007	"Il segreto della sabbia"	Max Longhi and Giorgio Vanni	Alessandra Valeri Manera	Cristina for You	Secret of Cerulean Sand	
2008	"Ma che melodia"	Goffredo Orlandi	Cristina D'Avena	Cristina for You	Onegai My Melody	
2008	"Alla ricerca della valle incantata"	Leonardo Ceglie and Giovanni Rosina	Fabrizio Berlincioni	Published only the instrumental version	The Land Before Time	
2009	"Angel's Friends"	Danilo Bernardi and Giuseppe Zanca	Antonio Divincenzo	Cristina for You	Angel's Friends	
2009	"Blue Dragon"	Max Longhi and Giorgio Vanni	Fabio Gargiulo, Max Longhi and Giorgio Vanni	Cristina for You	Blue Dragon	With Giorgio Vanni
2009	"Principesse gemelle"	Max Longhi and Giorgio Vanni	Cristina D'Avena	Cristina for You	Fushigiboshi no Futagohime	
2009	"C'era una volta la Terra"	Leonardo Ceglie and Giovanni Rosina	Cristina D'Avena	Natale con Cristina	Once Upon a Time... Planet Earth	
2009	"Viva Pinata"	Cristiano Macrì	Nuvola	Natale con Cristina	Viva Piñata	
2009	"Shizuku"	Franco Fasano	Cristina D'Avena	40 - Il sogno continua	Pururun! Shizuku-chan	
2010	"Emma"	Danilo Bernardi and Giuseppe Zanca	Nuvola	Natale con Cristina	Emma	
2010	"Il lungo viaggio di Porfirio"	Cristiano Macrì	Cristina D'Avena	Natale con Cristina	Porphy no Nagai Tabi	
2010	"La magia del cuore"	Maurizio Bianchini and Graziano Pegoraro	Cristina D'Avena	Natale con Cristina	Shugo Chara!	
2010	"Sorridi piccola Anna"	Augusto Martelli	Fabrizio Berlincioni	Natale con Cristina	Kon'nichiwa Anne: Before Green Gables	
2011	"Jewelpet"	Max Longhi and Giorgio Vanni	Fabio Gargiulo, Max Longhi and Giorgio Vanni	Le sigle originali dei cartoni di Italia 1	Jewelpet	
2011	"Mila e Shiro il sogno continua"	Cristiano Macrì	Arianna Martina Bergamaschi	Le sigle originali dei cartoni di Italia 1	New Attacker YOU!	
2011	"Emily della Luna nuova"	Danilo Bernardi and Giuseppe Zanca	Cristina D'Avena	40 - Il sogno continua	Kaze no shōjo Emirī	With Alessia Volpicelli
2012	"Estate d'amore"	Max Longhi and Giorgio Vanni	Cristina D'Avena	30 e poi... Parte prima	Karaoke Super Show!	
2019	"Centouno Dalmatian Street"	Kathryn D. Raio, Jonathan P. Rende	Lorena Brancucci	101 Dalmatian Street	101 Dalmatian Street	
2019	"Grandi avventure"	Noah Berg, Kevin Roberge e Carl Alan Taylor	Mattel Italy S.r.l.		Thomas & Friends	
2019	"Tutta d'un fiato (fino al fischio finale)"	Federico Mercuri, Giordano Cremona, Cristina D'Avena and Jacopo Ettorre		Tutta d'un fiato (fino al fischio finale)	Captain Tsubasa (2018 anime)	
2024	"C'erano una volta gli oggetti"	Cristina D'Avena, Nicola Iazzi, Marco Poletto and Riccardo Scirè		C'erano una volta gli oggetti	Once Upon a Time... The Objects	

== See also ==
- Cristina D'Avena singles discography
- Cristina D'Avena albums discography
