= Cristina D'Avena albums discography =

Most of songs sung by Cristina D'Avena are published in Fivelandia and Cristina D'Avena e i tuoi amici in TV compilation albums, which are released every year by RTI Music (previously named Five Record), the record label of Fininvest and Mediaset group, from 1983 to 2008. In these albums are often included songs sung by other singers, such as Enzo Draghi and Giorgio Vanni. The first album, which contains D'Avena's first songs (except "Il valzer del moscerino" and "È fuggito l'agnellino", her first songs presented at the Zecchino d'Oro), is Do re mi... five - Cantiamo con Five, released in 1982. Fivelandia series and Cristina D'Avena e i tuoi amici in TV series can be considered the main D'Avena's albums discography.

In addition, in D'Avena's discography, there are soundtrack albums of television series, which D'Avena plays the main character (Licia and Cristina series), cover albums, such as Cristina canta Disney, which contains covers of Disney songs and Magia di Natale, which contains covers of most popular Christmas songs, and remix albums, such as Cristina D'Avena Dance and Cartuno series. Also, are present several albums, which contains songs dedicated to television animated series aired by Fininvest and Mediaset (not to be confused soundtrack) and several compilation albums with her songs, which are not Fivelandia or Cristina D'Avena e i tuoi amici in TV.

In 2002, to celebrate her 20 years of musical career, D'Avena publishes the first compilation album promoted by her, Greatest Hits. Same thing happens in 2012, with the publishing of 30 e poi... Parte prima, compilation released to celebrate her 30 years of career. Next year, she publishes 30 e poi... Parte seconda.

In 2017, D'Avena changes her record label from RTI Music to Warner Music Italy and publishes Duets - Tutti cantano Cristina, followed by Duets Forever - Tutti cantano Cristina, which contains her most notable songs sung with other Italian artists.

== Main albums ==
=== First album ===
| Year | Title | Format | Label | Other artists | Notes |
|---|---|---|---|---|---|
| 1982 | Do re mi... Five - Cantiamo con Five | LP, cassette | Five Record | Marco Columbro, Augusto Martelli's orchestra and chorus and Augusto Martelli's orchestra | |

=== Fivelandia series ===
Fivelandia compilation album series starts in 1983 and contains, along with Cristina D'Avena e i tuoi amici in TV series started in 1987, most of the songs sung by D'Avena. Albums of this series are released every year in autumn, until 2004. The series is composed by 22 albums, except reissues.

| Year | Title | Format | Label | Other artists | Notes |
|---|---|---|---|---|---|
| 1983 | Fivelandia | LP, cassette | Five Record | Piccolo Coro dell'Antoniano, Sandra Mondaini, Marco Columbro, Dario Baldan Bembo, Caterina Caselli and Pepero | |
| 1984 | Fivelandia 2 | LP, cassette | Five Record | Piccolo Coro dell'Antoniano, Paolo Bonolis, Giancarlo Muratori, Augusto Martelli's orchestra and chorus and The Band of Mara | |
| 1985 | Fivelandia 3 | LP, cassette | Five Record | Giorgia Passeri, Giancarlo Muratori, Piccolo Coro dell'Antoniano and Silvano Fossati | |
| 1986 | Fivelandia 4 | LP, cassette | Five Record | Paolo Bonolis, Manuela Blanchard, Giancarlo Muratori, Piccolo Coro dell'Antoniano, Paolo Picutti, Giorgia Passeri, Pietro Ubaldi and I Muppet Babies e Mary | |
| 1987 | Fivelandia 5 | LP, cassette | Five Record | Paolo Bonolis, Manuela Blanchard, Giancarlo Muratori, Giorgia Passeri and Pietro Ubaldi | |
| 1988 | Fivelandia 6 | LP, cassette, CD | Five Record | Paolo Bonolis, Manuela Blanchard, Giancarlo Muratori, Debora Magnaghi and Pietro Ubaldi | |
| 1989 | Fivelandia 7 | LP, cassette, CD | Five Record | Paola Tovaglia, Pietro Ubaldi, Paolo Bonolis, Carlotta Pisani Brambilla, Debora Magnaghi, Carlo Sacchetti, Giancarlo Muratori and Daniele Demma | |
| 1990 | Fivelandia 8 | LP, cassette, CD | Five Record | Roberto Ceriotti, Carlotta Pisani Brambilla, Debora Magnaghi, Carlo Sacchetti, Manuela Blanchard, Giancarlo Muratori, Daniele Demma, Enzo Draghi, Giampaolo Daldello, Paola Tovaglia, Flavio Albanese, Marco Milano, Pietro Ubaldi and Davide Garbolino | |
| 1991 | Fivelandia 9 | LP, cassette, CD | Five Record | Roberto Ceriotti, Carlotta Pisani Brambilla, Debora Magnaghi, Carlo Sacchetti, Manuela Blanchard, Marco Bellavia, Giancarlo Muratori, Daniele Demma, Gerry Scotti, Massimo Dorati, Paola Tovaglia, Flavio Albanese, Marta Jacopini, Guido Cavalleri and Pietro Ubaldi | |
| 1992 | Fivelandia 10 | LP, cassette, CD | RTI Music | Peppino Mazzullo, Pietro Ubaldi, Giancarlo Muratori, Daniele Demma and Laura Marcora | |
| 1993 | Fivelandia 11 | LP, cassette, CD | RTI Music | Pietro Ubaldi | |
| 1994 | Fivelandia 12 | Cassette, CD | RTI Music | Marco Destro and Pietro Ubaldi | |
| 1995 | Fivelandia 13 | Cassette, CD | RTI Music | Marco Destro and Pietro Ubaldi | |
| 1996 | Fivelandia 14 | Cassette, CD | RTI Music | Marco Destro, Lara Parmiani and Pietro Ubaldi | |
| 1997 | Fivelandia 15 | Cassette, CD | RTI Music | Pietro Ubaldi and Enzo Draghi | |
| 1998 | Fivelandia 16 | Cassette, CD | RTI Music | Pietro Ubaldi, Enzo Draghi and Giorgio Vanni | |
| 1999 | Fivelandia 1999 | Cassette, CD | RTI Music | Pietro Ubaldi, Giorgio Vanni and Mattia Pisanu | |
| 2000 | Fivelandia 18 | Cassette, CD | RTI Music | Giorgio Vanni and Deborah Morese | |
| 2001 | Fivelandia 19 | Cassette, CD | RTI Music | Giorgio Vanni | |
| 2002 | Fivelandia 20 | Cassette, CD | RTI | Giorgio Vanni | |
| 2003 | Fivelandia 21 | Cassette, CD | RTI | Giorgio Vanni | |
| 2004 | Fivelandia 22 | Cassette, CD | RTI | Giorgio Vanni, Giacinto Livia, Peppino Mazzullo, Enzo Draghi and Cavour | |

==== Reissues ====
| Year | Title | Format | Label | Reissue of | Notes |
|---|---|---|---|---|---|
| 1987 | Fivelandia Collection | Three LPs, three cassettes | Five Record | | This compilation contains songs from 1983 to 1986 |
| 2006 | Fivelandia 1 & 2 | Double CD | RTI | Fivelandia and Fivelandia 2 | |
| 2006 | Fivelandia 3 & 4 | Double CD | RTI | Fivelandia 3 and Fivelandia 4 | |
| 2006 | Fivelandia 5 & 6 | Double CD | RTI | Fivelandia 5 and Fivelandia 6 | |
| 2006 | Fivelandia 7 & 8 | Double CD | RTI | Fivelandia 7 and Fivelandia 8 | |
| 2006 | Fivelandia 9 & 10 | Double CD | RTI | Fivelandia 9 and Fivelandia 10 | |
| 2006 | Fivelandia 1 | CD | RTI | Fivelandia | |
| 2006 | Fivelandia 2 | CD | RTI | Fivelandia 2 | |
| 2006 | Fivelandia 3 | CD | RTI | Fivelandia 3 | |
| 2006 | Fivelandia 4 | CD | RTI | Fivelandia 4 | |
| 2006 | Fivelandia 5 | CD | RTI | Fivelandia 5 | |
| 2006 | Fivelandia 6 | CD | RTI | Fivelandia 6 | |
| 2006 | Fivelandia 7 | CD | RTI | Fivelandia 7 | |
| 2006 | Fivelandia 8 | CD | RTI | Fivelandia 8 | |
| 2006 | Fivelandia 9 | CD | RTI | Fivelandia 9 | |
| 2006 | Fivelandia 10 | CD | RTI | Fivelandia 10 | |
| 2015 | Fivelandia Story | Digital download | RTI | | Selection of 100 songs taken from Fivelandia albums |
| 2018 | Fivelandia 1 Reloaded | Digital download | RTI | Fivelandia | |
| 2018 | Fivelandia 2 Reloaded | Digital download | RTI | Fivelandia 2 | |
| 2018 | Fivelandia 3 Reloaded | Digital download | RTI | Fivelandia 3 | |
| 2018 | Fivelandia 4 Reloaded | Digital download | RTI | Fivelandia 4 | |
| 2019 | Fivelandia 5 Reloaded | Digital download | RTI | Fivelandia 5 | |
| 2019 | Fivelandia 6 Reloaded | Digital download | RTI | Fivelandia 6 | |
| 2019 | Fivelandia 7 Reloaded | Digital download | RTI | Fivelandia 7 | |
| 2019 | Fivelandia 8 Reloaded | Digital download | RTI | Fivelandia 8 | |

=== Cristina D'Avena e i tuoi amici in TV series ===
The other important part of the D'Avena's songs is published in Cristina D'Avena e i tuoi amici in TV compilation album series (first album is named Cristina D'Avena con i tuoi amici in TV), which starts in 1987. Albums of this series are published every year in spring, until 2008. The series is composed by 21 albums, except reissues.

| Year | Title | Format | Label | Other artists | Notes |
|---|---|---|---|---|---|
| 1987 | Cristina D'Avena con i tuoi amici in TV | LP, cassette, picture disc | Five Record | | |
| 1988 | Cristina D'Avena e i tuoi amici in TV 2 | LP, cassette | Five Record | Enzo Draghi, Paolo Picutti and Manuel De Peppe | |
| 1989 | Cristina D'Avena e i tuoi amici in TV 3 | LP, cassette, CD | Five Record | | |
| 1990 | Cristina D'Avena e i tuoi amici in TV 4 | LP, cassette, CD | Five Record | | |
| 1991 | Cristina D'Avena e i tuoi amici in TV 5 | LP, cassette, CD | Five Record | | |
| 1993 | Cristina D'Avena e i tuoi amici in TV 6 | Cassette, CD | RTI Music | | |
| 1994 | Cristina D'Avena e i tuoi amici in TV 7 | Cassette, CD | RTI Music | Marco Destro and Enzo Draghi | |
| 1995 | Cristina D'Avena e i tuoi amici in TV 8 | Cassette, CD | RTI Music | Marco Destro | |
| 1996 | Cristina D'Avena e i tuoi amici in TV 9 | Cassette, CD | RTI Music | Enzo Draghi and Marco Destro | |
| 1997 | Cristina D'Avena e i tuoi amici in TV 10 | Cassette, CD | RTI Music | Enzo Draghi and Marco Destro | |
| 1998 | Cristina D'Avena e i tuoi amici in TV 11 | Cassette, CD | RTI Music | Enzo Draghi | |
| 1999 | Cristina D'Avena e i tuoi amici in TV 12 | Cassette, CD | RTI Music | Pietro Ubaldi and Giorgio Vanni | |
| 2000 | Cristina D'Avena e i tuoi amici in TV 13 | Cassette, CD | RTI Music | Giorgio Vanni | |
| 2001 | Cristina D'Avena e i tuoi amici in TV 14 | Cassette, CD | RTI Music | Giorgio Vanni | |
| 2002 | Cristina D'Avena e i tuoi amici in TV 15 | Cassette, CD | RTI Music | Giorgio Vanni and Enzo Draghi | |
| 2003 | Cristina D'Avena e i tuoi amici in TV 16 | Cassette, CD | RTI Music | Giorgio Vanni | |
| 2004 | Cristina D'Avena e i tuoi amici in TV 2004 | Cassette, CD | RTI Music | Giorgio Vanni and Marco Destro | |
| 2005 | Cristina D'Avena e i tuoi amici in TV 18 | CD | RTI | The Ninjas vs Gabry Ponte, Giorgio Vanni and Pietro Ubaldi | |
| 2006 | Cristina D'Avena e i tuoi amici in TV 19 | CD | RTI | Silvio Pozzoli, Giorgio Vanni, Le Trollz and Yago e Missbit | |
| 2007 | Cristina D'Avena e i tuoi amici in TV 20 | CD | RTI | Giorgio Vanni, Sara Bernabini, Gerry Scotti and Ricky Belloni | |
| 2008 | Cristina D'Avena e i tuoi amici in TV 21 | CD | RTI | Antonio Divincenzo, Giorgio Vanni and Linee Parallele | |

==== Reissues ====
| Year | Title | Format | Label | Notes |
|---|---|---|---|---|
| 2015 | Cristina D'Avena e i tuoi amici in TV Collection | Digital download | RTI | Selection of 100 songs taken from Cristina D'Avena e i tuoi amici in TV albums |
| 2019 | Cristina D'Avena e i tuoi amici in TV Reloaded | Digital download | RTI | Selection of 100 songs taken from Cristina D'Avena e i tuoi amici in TV albums |

=== Other compilations with unpublished songs ===
| Year | Title | Format | Label | Other artists | Notes |
|---|---|---|---|---|---|
| 1992 | Cantiamo con Cristina. Che avventura! | VHS + Cassette | Five Record | Pietro Ubaldi | This album contains one unpublished song by Cristina D'Avena |
| 2004 | Cartoon Story | 5-CD set | RTI | I ragazzi dai capelli rossi, Giorgio Vanni, Pietro Ubaldi, Piccolo Coro dell'Antoniano, Roberto Ceriotti, Carlotta Brambilla, Debora Magnaghi, Carlo Sacchetti, Manuela Blanchard, Giancarlo Muratori, Daniele Demma, La Banda dei Bucanieri, Paolo e Cristina, I Robotini, Giampaolo Daldello, Enzo Draghi, Pietro Ubaldi, Renato Rascel, Mal, Actarus, Elisabetta Viviani, Pippi, Lino Patruno and His Baby band, Marco Destro and I ragazzi di Remì | This album contains one unpublished song by Cristina D'Avena and Giorgio Vanni |
| 2005 | Cartoonlandia Girls | CD | RTI | Giorgio Vanni, Enzo Draghi and Pietro Ubaldi | The album contains one unpublished song by Cristina D'Avena |
| 2007 | Principi e principesse | CD | RTI | | The album contains one unpublished song by Cristina D'Avena |
| 2009 | Cristina for You | Double CD | RTI | Giorgio Vanni, Marco Destro | The first disc contains unpublished songs, while the second disc contains songs published between 1982 and 2000 |
| 2010 | Natale con Cristina | 4-CD set | RTI | Laura, Enzo Draghi, Giacinto Livia, Matteo e Francesco, Benedetta Caretta, Giorgio Vanni, Fabio Ingrosso, Benedetta Caretta and Roberta Pagnetti | The fourth disc contains unpublished songs |
| 2011 | Le sigle originali dei cartoni di Italia 1 | Double CD | RTI | Giorgio Vanni, Giacinto Livia, Benedetta Caretta, Susanna Balbarani, Antonio Divincenzo, Giorgio Vanni, Fabio Ingrosso, Matteo e Francesco, Vitros and Valentina Ponzone | The double-compilation contains some unpublished songs |
| 2013 | Cartoon in Love | Digital download | RTI | Roberta Pagnetti, Valentina Ponzone, Daniela Rando and Vera Quarleri | The album contains one published song |
| 2016 | #le sigle più belle | Double CD | RTI | Giorgio Vanni, Marco Destro | The album contains three unpublished songs |

==== Reissues ====
| Year | Title | Format | Label | Reissue of | Notes |
|---|---|---|---|---|---|
| 2011 | Cristina for You | Double CD | RTI | Cristina for You | |
| 2018 | #le sigle più belle Vol. 1 | Double LP | RTI | #le sigle più belle | Reissue in limited edition double vinyl record |

=== Recent albums ===
| Year | Title | Format | Label | Notes |
|---|---|---|---|---|
| 2017 | Duets - Tutti cantano Cristina | CD, LP | Warner Music Italy | |
| 2018 | Duets Forever - Tutti cantano Cristina | CD, LP | Warner Music Italy | |

==== Reissues ====
| Year | Title | Format | Label | Reissue of | Notes |
|---|---|---|---|---|---|
| 2018 | Duets + Duets Forever – Tutti cantano Cristina | Double CD | Warner Music Italy | Duets – Tutti amano Cristina and Duets Forever – Tutti amano Cristina | Box set, which includes both Duets albums |

== Animated series albums ==
In the Cristina D'Avena's discography are included several albums dedicated to some animated series aired by Fininvest and Mediaset. These albums are not the soundtracks of these animated series.

| Year | Title | Format | Label | Other artists | Notes |
|---|---|---|---|---|---|
| 1986 | CantaSnorky | LP, cassette | Five Record | | Dedicated to Snorks animated series |
| 1987 | David gnomo amico mio | LP, cassette | Five Record | Pietro Ubaldi | Dedicated to The World of David the Gnome animated series |
| 1987 | Mio mini pony | LP, cassette | Five Record | | Dedicated to My Little Pony animated series |
| 1987 | Puffiamo all'avventura | LP, cassette | Five Record | | Dedicated to The Smurfs animated series |
| 1987 | Maple Town: un nido di simpatia | LP, cassette | Five Record | | Dedicated to Maple Town anime |
| 1987 | Piccola, bianca Sibert | LP, cassette | Five Record | Pietro Ubaldi | Dedicated to Seabert animated series |
| 1988 | Palla al centro per Rudy | LP, cassette | Five Record | | Dedicated to Ganbare, Kickers! anime |
| 1988 | Viaggiamo con Benjamin | LP, cassette | Five Record | Pietro Ubaldi | Dedicated to Wisdom of the Gnomes animated series |
| 2003 | Hamtaro piccoli criceti, grandi avventure | CD, cassette | RTI | Giorgio Vanni | Dedicated to Hamtaro anime |
| 2006 | Mirmo | CD | RTI | Silvio Pozzoli, Sara Bernabini, Giacinto Livia, Giorgio Vanni, Massimiliano Corfini and Antonio Galbiati | Dedicated to Mirmo! anime |

=== Reissues ===
| Year | Title | Format | Label | Reissue of | Notes |
|---|---|---|---|---|---|
| 2006 | Puffiamo all'avventura | CD | RTI | Puffiamo all'avventura | |
| 2006 | Hamtaro piccoli criceti, grandi avventure | CD | RTI | Hamtaro piccoli criceti, grandi avventure | |

== Soundtracks albums ==
In the Cristina D'Avena's discography are included albums, which contains the soundtrack of television series, which D'Avena plays the main character. It also included the Italian-language soundtrack of Ai Shite Knight (Kiss Me Licia) anime.

| Year | Title | Format | Label | Other artists | Notes |
|---|---|---|---|---|---|
| 1986 | Kiss Me Licia e i Bee Hive | LP, cassette | Five Record | Enzo Draghi, Silvano Fossati | Soundtrack of Italian adaptation of Ai Shite Knight anime, entitled Kiss Me Licia |
| 1986 | Love Me Licia e i Bee Hive | LP, cassette | Five Record | Enzo Draghi | Soundtrack of Love me Licia television series |
| 1987 | Licia dolce Licia e i Bee Hive | LP, cassette | Five Record | Enzo Draghi | Soundtrack of Licia dolce Licia television series |
| 1987 | Teneramente Licia e i Bee Hive | LP, cassette | Five Record | Enzo Draghi | Soundtrack of Teneramente Licia television series |
| 1988 | Balliamo e cantiamo con Licia | LP, cassette | Five Record | Enzo Draghi | Soundtrack of Balliamo e cantiamo con Licia television series |
| 1988 | Arriva Cristina | LP, cassette | Five Record | Enzo Draghi, Ricky Belloni | Soundtrack of Arriva Cristina television series |
| 1988 | Cristina | LP, cassette, CD | Five Record | Ricky Belloni | Soundtrack of Cristina television series |
| 1988 | Cri Cri | LP, cassette, CD | Five Record | | Soundtrack of Cri Cri television series |
| 1991 | Cristina, l'Europa siamo noi | LP, cassette, CD | Five Record | | Soundtrack of Cristina, l'Europa siamo noi television series |
| 2019 | 101 Dalmatian Street (Musica dalla serie TV) | Digital download | Walt Disney Records | Ilaria De Rosa, Gabriella Scalise, Me contro te, Kathryn D. Rende, Celica Gray, Scott Krippayne and Felicia Barton | Soundtrack of 101 Dalmatian Street animated series, in which D'Avena sung the Italian opening theme. |

=== Reissues ===
| Year | Title | Format | Label | Reissue of | Notes |
|---|---|---|---|---|---|
| 2010 | Licia e i Bee Hive Story | Four CDs set | RTI | Kiss Me Licia e i Bee Hive, Love Me Licia e i Bee Hive, Licia dolce Licia e i Bee Hive, Teneramente Licia e i Bee Hive and Balliamo e cantiamo con Licia | |
| 2010 | Arriva Cristina Story | Four CDs set | RTI | Arriva Cristina, Cristina, Cri Cri and Cristina, l'Europa siamo noi | |

== Cover albums ==
| Year | Title | Format | Label | Other artists | Notes |
|---|---|---|---|---|---|
| 1994 | Cristina canta Disney | Cassette, CD | RTI Music | I Piccoli Cantori di Milano, Pietro Ubaldi, Enzo Draghi | This album contains cover of Disney songs |
| 2006 | Il valzer del moscerino | CD | RTI | | This album contains cover of Zecchino d'Oro songs |
| 2007 | 44 gatti e tante altre | CD | RTI | | This album contains cover of Zecchino d'Oro songs |
| 2009 | Magia di Natale | CD | RTI | | This album contains cover of Christmas songs |

=== Reissues ===
| Year | Title | Format | Label | Reissue of | Notes |
|---|---|---|---|---|---|
| 1997 | Cristina canta Disney | Cassette, CD | RTI Music | Cristina canta Disney | |
| 2006 | Cristina canta Disney | CD | RTI | Cristina canta Disney | |
| 2010 | Il coccodrillo, le tagliatelle... | Double CD | RTI | Cristina canta Disney, Il valzer del moscerino and 44 gatti e tante altre | |
| 2011 | Il valzer del moscerino (Special Edition) | CD | RTI | Il valzer del moscerino and 44 gatti e tante altre | |
| 2011 | Magia di Natale | CD | RTI | Magia di Natale | |
| 2011 | Magia di Natale | CD | RTI | Magia di Natale | |
| 2014 | Magia di Natale – Deluxe Edition | CD | RTI | Magia di Natale | |
| 2017 | Il valzer del moscerino | CD | RTI | Il valzer del moscerino and 44 gatti e tante altre | |

== Remix albums ==
| Year | Title | Format | Label | Other artists | Notes |
|---|---|---|---|---|---|
| 1996 | Cristina D'Avena Dance | Cassette, CD | RTI Music | Enzo Draghi and Marco Destro | |
| 2000 | Pokémon Cartoons Dance Compilation | Cassette, CD | Ice Record under license RTI Music | Pietro Ubaldi, Enzo Draghi and Giorgio Vanni | |

=== Cartuno series ===
Cartuno is a series of albums, which contains Cristina D'Avena and Giorgio Vanni's remixed songs, published from 2001 to 2004. These albums are produced by Max Longhi and Giorgio Vanni.

| Year | Title | Format | Label | Other artists | Notes |
|---|---|---|---|---|---|
| 2001 | Cartuno | Cassette, CD | Ice Record under license RTI Music | Giorgio Vanni, Pietro Ubaldi and Daniele Demma | |
| 2002 | Cartuno - Parte 2 | Cassette, CD | Ice Record under license RTI Music | Giorgio Vanni | |
| 2003 | Cartuno - Parte 3 | Cassette, CD | Ice Record under license RTI Music | Giorgio Vanni | |
| 2004 | Cartuno - Parte 4 | CD | The S.A.I.F.A.M. Group under license RTI | Giorgio Vanni | |

=== Reissues ===
| Year | Title | Format | Label | Reissue of | Notes |
|---|---|---|---|---|---|
| 1997 | Cristina D'Avena Baby Mix | Cassette, CD | RTI Music | Cristina D'Avena Dance | |
| 2006 | Cristina D'Avena Baby Mix | CD | RTI | Cristina D'Avena Dance | |
| 2012 | Il valzer del moscerino presenta Cartuno Remix | Double CD | Self under license RTI | Cartuno – Parte 3 and Cartuno – Parte 4 | |

== Compilation albums promoted by Cristina D'Avena ==
| Year | Title | Format | Label | Other artists | Notes |
|---|---|---|---|---|---|
| 2002 | Greatest Hits | Double cassette, double CD | RTI | Pietro Ubaldi and Giorgio Vanni | |
| 2012 | 30 e poi... Parte prima | Triple CD | RTI | Augusto Martelli's orchestra and chorus, Peppino Mazzullo, Giorgio Vanni and Patrick Ray Pugliese | |
| 2013 | 30 e poi... Parte seconda | DVD + CD | RTI | Marco Columbro, Enzo Draghi, Ricky Belloni, Gerry Scotti and Pietro Ubaldi | |

=== Reissues ===
| Year | Title | Format | Label | Reissue of | Notes |
|---|---|---|---|---|---|
| 2003 | Greatest Hits – Vol. 1 | CD | RTI | Greatest Hits first disc | |
| 2003 | Greatest Hits – Vol. 2 | CD | RTI | Greatest Hits second disc | |
| 2003 | Greatest Hits | Double cassette | RTI | Greatest Hits | |

== Other compilation albums ==
In this list are excluded the albums already listed in "Other compilations with unpublished songs" section.

| Year | Title | Format | Label | Other artists | Notes |
|---|---|---|---|---|---|
| 1982 | Bambino Pinocchio e i suoi amici in TV | Cassette | Five Record | I Piccoli Grilli | |
| 1986 | Memole dolce Memole | Cassette | Five Record | | |
| 1991 | Bim Bum Bam - Vol. 1 | LP, cassette, CD | Five Record | Piccolo Coro dell'Antoniano, Giampaolo Daldello, Giorgia Passeri and Giancarlo Muratori | |
| 1991 | Bim Bum Bam - Vol. 2 | LP, cassette, CD | Five Record | Paolo Bonolis, Manuela Blanchard, Giancarlo Muratori, Piccolo Coro dell'Antoniano, Giampaolo Daldello, Enzo Draghi, Giorgia Passeri and Giancarlo Muratori | |
| 1991 | Il meglio di Licia e i Bee Hive | LP, cassette, CD | Five Record | Enzo Draghi | |
| 1991 | I grandi successi di Fivelandia | Cassette | Five Record | Enzo Draghi | Sold with the Fivelandia TV VHS |
| 1991 | Cristina per noi | VHS + Cassette | Five Record | Gerry Scotti, Fiorella Pierobon, Sabina Stilo, Carlo Pistarino, Ricky Belloni and Enzo Draghi | |
| 1992 | Le più belle canzoni di Cristina D'Avena - Vol. 1 | Cassette | Five Record | | Sold with Perlana products |
| 1992 | Le più belle canzoni di Cristina D'Avena - Vol. 2 | Cassette | Five Record | | Sold with Perlana products |
| 1992 | Cantiamo con Cristina. Cuccioli in erba | VHS + Cassette | Five Record | Peppino Mazzullo and Pietro Ubaldi | |
| 1993 | I successi di Cristina - Vol. 1 | Cassette | Five Record | Ricky Belloni and Enzo Draghi | |
| 1993 | I successi di Cristina - Vol. 2 | Cassette | Five Record | Ricky Belloni | |
| 1993 | Le canzoni dei Puffi | Cassette | Five Record | | |
| 1993 | Le canzoni di Licia | Cassette | Five Record | Enzo Draghi | |
| 1997 | Cristalli, petali e misteri per Sailor Moon | Cassette, CD | RTI Music | | |
| 1997 | Un'avventura al giorno | Cassette, CD | RTI Music | Marco Destro, Enzo Draghi and Giampaolo Daldello | |
| 1997 | L'amore è magia | Cassette, CD | RTI Music | | |
| 1997 | Le fiabe più belle | Cassette, CD | RTI Music | | |
| 1997 | Un mondo di amici | Cassette, CD | RTI Music | Peppino Mazzullo | |
| 1997 | Prendi il mondo e vai | Cassette, CD | RTI Music | Ricky Belloni | |
| 1999 | Siamo tutti campioni | Cassette, CD | RTI Music | Marco Destro, Manuel De Peppe and Paolo Picutti | |
| 1999 | Quattro zampe e... | Cassette, CD | RTI Music | Pietro Ubaldi | |
| 1999 | Amiche del cuore | Cassette, CD | RTI Music | Pietro Ubaldi | |
| 1999 | Nel meraviglioso mondo degli gnomi | Cassette | RTI Music | Pietro Ubaldi | Attached to the number two of Nel meraviglioso mondo degli gnomi magazine by Fabbri Editori |
| 2002 | Le canzoni più belle | CD | RTI Music | | Album distributed in Dixan per la scuola campaign promotion |
| 2004 | Boing - Le sigle più belle dei cartoni | CD | RTI | Giorgio Vanni and Giampaolo Daldello | |
| 2004 | Cartoon Parade | CD | RTI | Giorgio Vanni | Attached to Donna Moderna magazine |
| 2005 | Cartoonlandia Boys | Triple CD | RTI | Giorgio Vanni, The Ninjas vs Gabry Ponte, Pietro Ubaldi, Enzo Draghi, Marco Masini and Giacinto Livia | |
| 2006 | Wonder Girls | CD | RTI | | |
| 2006 | The Master Saga/Pokémon Saga | CD | RTI | Giorgio Vanni | |
| 2006 | Mundial goal | CD | RTI | Giorgio Vanni and Marco Destro | |
| 2006 | Il meglio di Cartoon Music | CD | RTI | Giacinto Livia, Tommaso, Massimo Senzioni, Alessandra, Chiara, Sergio Botti, Giorgio Vanni, Le Trolls and The Ninjas vs Gabry Ponte | Attached to TV Sorrisi e Canzoni magazine |
| 2006 | Le canzoni di nonna Pina | Double CD | RTI | Giacinto Livia, Tommaso, Massimo Senzioni, Alessandra, Chiara, Sergio Botti, Giorgio Vanni, Le Trolls and The Ninjas vs Gabry Ponte and Angelica | |
| 2006 | Crocodile Music | Double CD | RTI | Giacinto Livia, Tommaso, Giorgio Vanni, Chiara, Massimo Dorati, Giampaolo Daldello and Sergio Botti | |
| 2006 | Cartoonlandia Boys & Girls Story | Triple CD | RTI | Augusto Martelli's orchestra and chorus, Giorgio Vanni, Cavour, Marco Masini, Lucky Star, Maxen, Sara Bernabini, Silvio Pozzoli, Le Trollz and Yago e MissBit | |
| 2006 | Le canzoni di nonna Pina - Special | Triple CD | RTI | Vera Quarleri, Rocco Bolzani, Giacinto Livia, Gerardo manzo, Tommaso Minervini, Sebastiano Procida, Johnny Borelli, Massimo Ceriotti, Mariarosa Boccasile, Simona Carlone and Alby | |
| 2007 | Che magia! | CD | RTI | | |
| 2007 | I nostri eroi | CD | RTI | Giorgio Vanni and Silvio Pozzoli | |
| 2007 | Impariamo e scopriamo | CD | RTI | | |
| 2007 | Nel mondo degli gnomi | CD | RTI | | |
| 2007 | Mostri, streghe e vampiri | CD | RTI | | |
| 2007 | Super Stars | CD | RTI | Giorgio Vanni | |
| 2007 | Le canzoni di nonna Pina - Greatest Hits | Double CD | RTI | Giacinto Livia, Le Trollz, Vera Quarleri, Tommaso, Masimo Ceriotti, Sara Bernabini, Massimiliano Corfini, Chiara, Alessandra, Sergio Botti | |
| 2007 | Baby Dance | CD | RTI | Vera Quarleri, Giacinto Livia, Adrea, Tommaso, Angelica, Giulia, Michael, Nadia Biondini, Antonio Caporale, Massimo Senzioni, Viviana, Giacinto Livia, Johnny Borelli, Giorgio Scalzadonna, Marco Bonfico, Mariarosa Boccasile, Massimo Ceriotti, Alby, Linee Parallele, Chiara, Valentina Ponzone, Gerardo manzo, Tommaso Minervini, Sebastiano Procida, Valeria Caponnetto, Simona Carlone, Valentina Abitini, Risolo Shaila and Giorgio Vanni | |
| 2007 | Pokémon Compilation | CD | RTI | Giorgio Vanni | |
| 2008 | Le canzoni di nonna Pina Story | Double CD | RTI | Giorgio Vanni and Vera Quarleri | |
| 2008 | Boing Music Compilation | CD | RTI | Giorgio Vanni, Sara Bernabini, Stefano Acqua, Silvio Pozzoli and Deborah Morese | |
| 2008 | Natale con Nonna Pina | Five CDs set | RTI | Valentina Ponzone, Giacinto Livia, Tommaso, Sergio Botti, Andrea, Tommaso, Giorgio Vanni, Linee Parallele, Chiata, Antonio Caporale, Vera Quarleri, Le Trollz and Yago e MissBit | |
| 2008 | Cartoon Music Mania | Double CD | RTI | Giorgio Vanni, Giacinto Livia, Vera Quarleri, Tommaso and Linee Parallele | |
| 2009 | 50 volte Puffi - I nostri primi cinquant'anni | Digital download | RTI | | |
| 2009 | Fai la nanna con Cicciobello | CD | RTI | Piccolo Coro dell'Antoniano | |
| 2009 | Cart1 - I cartoni originali di Italia 1 | CD | RTI | Antonio Divincenzo, Giorgio Vanni, Susanna Balbarani, Silvio Pozzoli, Fabio Ingrosso, Giorgio Vanni and Antonio Divincenzo | |
| 2010 | Bambini per sempre | Triple CD | RTI | Piccolo Coro dell'Antoniano and Vera Quarleri | |
| 2010 | Puffi che passione | Double CD | RTI | Augusto Martelli's orchestra and chorus | |
| 2011 | Cristina D'Avena e le Super Girls | Double CD | RTI | Le Trollz and Yago e Missbit | |
| 2011 | Cristina D'Avena e il mondo delle favole | Double CD | RTI | Enzo Draghi and Vera Quarleri | |
| 2011 | Cartoonlandia Story '80-'90 | Double CD | RTI | Augusto Martelli's orchestra and chorus, Enzo Draghi, Giampaolo Daldello and Giorgio Vanni | |
| 2011 | Cartoonlandia Story 2000-2010 | Double CD | RTI | Giorgio Vanni, Cavour, The Ninjas vs Gabry Ponte, Le Trollz, Yago e MissBit, Sol Bontempi, Linee Parallele, Sara Bernabini, Susanna Balbarani and Benedetta Caretta | |
| 2011 | Super Campioni | Double CD | RTI | Paolo Picutti, Giacinto Livia, Giorgio Vanni, Enzo Draghi, Manuel De peppe, Silvano Fossati, Giampaolo Daldello, Piccolo Coro dell'Antoniano, Antonio Divincenzo, Manuel De Peppe and Marco Destro | |
| 2011 | Oltre i cieli dell'avventura e... | Double CD | RTI | Giorgio Vanni, Maxen, Susanna Balbarani, Silvio Pozzoli, Giacinto Livia and Cavour | |
| 2011 | Nella bella fattoria | Double CD | RTI | Peppino Mazzullo, Giacinto Livia, Andrea, Tommaso, Pietro Ubaldi, Giorgio Vanni, Rocco Bolzani, Silvio Pozzoli, Benedetta Caretta and Enzo Draghi | |
| 2011 | Il meglio di Cristina D'Avena | Double CD | RTI | Pietro Ubaldi | |
| 2011 | Balla e canta con Nonna Pina | Triple CD | RTI | Giacinto Livia, Valentina Ponzone, Linee Parallele, Simona Carlone, Alby, Massimiliano Corfini and Giorgio Vanni | |
| 2012 | Bim Bum Bam Compilation | Double CD | RTI | Piccolo Coro dell'Antoniano, Augusto Martelli's orchestra and chorus, Enzo Draghi, Roberto Ceriotti, Carlotta Brambilla, Debora Magnaghi, Carlo Sacchetti, Manuela Blanchard, Giancarlo Muratori, Daniele Demma and Paolo Bonolis | |
| 2012 | Il valzer del moscerino presenta le canzoni da grandi | Double CD | RTI | Massimiliano Corfini, Rocco Bolzani, Giacinto Livia, Gerardo manzo, Tommaso Minervini, Sebastiano Procida, Angelica, Tommaso, Massimo Ceriotti, Andrea, Simona Carlone, Giorgio Scalzadonna, Marco Bonfico, Massimiliano Corfini, Giulia, Valeria Caponnetto and Linee Parallele | |
| 2012 | Il valzer del moscerino... e altre ancora | Double CD | RTI | Paolo Bonolis, Manuela Blanchard, Giancarlo Muratori and Piccolo Coro dell'Antoniano | |
| 2014 | #auguriCri | Digital download | RTI | Giorgio Vanni | |
| 2015 | Cristina D'Avena | Picture disc | RTI | | |
| 2017 | I grandi classici - Le sigle storiche dei cartoni di Canale 5, Italia 1 e Rete 4 | Double CD | RTI | Augusto Martelli's orchestra and chorus, Giorgio Vanni and Silvano Fossati | |
| 2017 | Il mondo delle favole | Double CD | RTI | Vera Quarlieri and Enzo Draghi | |
| 2017 | Fantastiche avventure | Double CD | RTI | Giorgio Vanni, Cavour, Marco Gallo, Silvio Pozzoli, Linee Parallele, Le Trollz, Yago & MissBit, Maxen and Giacinto Livia | |
| 2018 | Le più belle sigle TV di Bim Bum Bam | Triple CD | Mondadori | Giorgio Vanni and Marco Destro | |

=== Reissues ===
| Year | Title | Format | Label | Reissue of | Notes |
|---|---|---|---|---|---|
| 2007 | Il mondo delle favole | CD | RTI | Le canzoni di nonna Pina – Special second disc | |
| 2007 | Le canzoni di nonna Pina | CD | RTI | Le canzoni di nonna Pina | |
| 2009 | Nonna Pina Sprint – Le tagliatelle di Nonna Pina... e molte altre | Triple CD | RTI | Natale con nonna Pina | Reissue without fourth disc |
| 2009 | Boing Cartoon Compilation | CD | RTI | Boing Music Compilation | |
| 2010 | Baby Dance Estate | Triple CD | RTI | Baby Dance | |
| 2011 | Cristalli, petali e misteri per Sailor Moon | CD | RTI | Cristalli, petali e misteri per Sailor Moon | |
| 2011 | Puffi che passione | CD | RTI | Puffi che passione | |
| 2012 | Il valzer del moscerino presenta la bella fattoria | Double CD | RTI | Nella bella fattoria | |
| 2012 | Il valzer del moscerino presenta le favole | Double CD | RTI | Cristina D'Avena e il mondo delle favole | |

== Instrumental albums ==
| Year | Title | Format | Label | Notes |
|---|---|---|---|---|
| 2009 | Cartoonlandia - Le basi musicali dei cartoni | CD | RTI | |
| 2009 | Cartoonlandia: basi musicali | Book + CD | RTI | This album is sold with a book contains sheet music. |

== Other albums ==
| Year | Title | Format | Label | Other artists | Notes |
|---|---|---|---|---|---|
| 2016 | 50th Cartoon Music Contest - Gold Compilation 2016 | CD | Rai Com, Crioma | DB Day's Band, TeleRicordi Band and G.O.P.S. | |

== Albums where Cristina D'Avena is guest artist ==
| Year | Main artist | Title | Format | Label | Tracks sung by D'Avena | Notes |
|---|---|---|---|---|---|---|
| 1968 | Various artists | 10° Zecchino d'Oro | LP, cassette | Rifi Record | Il valzer del moscerino | |
| 1982 | Various artists | I Puffi | LP, cassette | K-Tel | Canzone dei Puffi; A E I O U; Notte Puff; La scuola dei Puffi | |
| 1983 | Various artists | Le canzoni dei Puffi | K-Tel | LP, cassette | John e Solfami; A E I O U; La scuola dei Puffi | It should not be confused with D'Avena compilation released in 1993 |
| 1984 | Various artists | La banda dei Puffi | LP, cassette | K-Tel | Puffi la la la; A E I O U | |
| 2010 | Various artists | Matricole & Meteore – La compilation | Double CD | RTI | Medley M&M: Kiss me Licia/Mila e Shiro due cuori nella pallavolo/Occhi di gatto | |
| 2011 | Gisella Cozzo & Xmas Friends | 4 Haiti | CD | Top Records | Natale speciale (sung by Gisella Cozzo featuring Cristina D'Avena) | |
| 2012 | Gem Boy | Gagoni | CD | | Ki ti kissa (sung by Gem Boy featuring Cristina D'Avena) | |
| 2018 | Elio e le Storie Tese | Arrivedorci | Double CD, four LPs set | F&P | Piattaforma (sung by Elio e le Storie Tese featuring Cristina D'Avena) | |

== See also ==
- Cristina D'Avena singles discography
- List of theme songs recorded by Cristina D'Avena
