= Cristina D'Avena singles discography =

First singles by Cristina D'Avena contain "Il valzer del moscerino", her first song presented at the tenth Zecchino d'Oro, in addition to a single destinated to Japan. Later, Five Record publishes most of her singles, which are recorded in 45 rpm discs, from 1981 to 1991. From 1991 to 2009, no singles are published, whereby her songs are published only in her albums.

Since 2009, D'Avena singles are published mainly in digital download.

== 45 rpm singles published from 1968 to 1991 ==
=== First singles ===
Year	A-side	B-side	Label	Album	Notes
1968	"Il valzer del moscerino"	"Sitting Bull" (sung by Maurizio Facciolo)	Rifi Record	10° Zecchino d'Oro	
1968	"Il valzer del moscerino"	"Il semaforo" (sung by Maurizio Rossi)	Rifi Record	10° Zecchino d'Oro	
1971	"La ballata degli elefanti" (sung by Piccolo Coro dell'Antoniano); "Se avessi" (sung by Walter Guidi)	"Il valzer del moscerino"; "La minicoda" (sung by Lauretta Mollica)	Rifi Record		
1971	"Il caffè della Peppina"	"Il sorpassista"	Rifi Record		Sung in Japanese language
1973	"Il valzer del moscerino"	"Piva Piva" (sung by Piccolo Coro dell'Antoniano)	Colussi		Sold as a gift with Colussi cookies

=== Five Record singles ===
Year	A-side	B-side	Album	Notes
1981	"Bambino Pinocchio"	"Bambino Pinocchio (instrumental)"	Do re mi... Five - Cantiamo con Five	
1982	"Laura"	"Mon Ciccì"	Do re mi... Five – Cantiamo con Five	
1982	"Canzone dei Puffi"	"Ghimbirighimbi"	Fivelandia (A-side); Do re mi... Five – Cantiamo con Five (B-side)	
1982	"Mon Ciccì"	"Mon Ciccì (instrumental)"	Do re mi... five – Cantiamo con Five	Sold as a gift with Monchhichi dolls
1983	"Lucy"	"La regina dei mille anni"	Fivelandia	With Augusto Martelli's orchestra and chorus
1983	"John e Solfami"	"La scuola dei Puffi"	Fivelandia (A-side)	
1983	"New Five Time" (Note: With Marco Columbro)	"Vola bambino" (Note: Sung by Pepero)	Fivelandia	
1984	"I ragazzi della Senna (Il tulipano nero)"	"Space Runner" (Note: Sung by The Band of Mara)	Fivelandia	
1984	"La sui monti con Annette"	"Bum Bum"	Fivelandia 2	
1984	"Puffi la la la"	"A E I O U"	Fivelandia 2	
1984	"Georgie"	"Georgie (instrumental)"	Fivelandia 2	
1984	"Nanà supergirl"	"Pollon, Pollon combinaguai"	Fivelandia 2	
1985	"L'incantevole Creamy"	"Ciao Ciao"	Fivelandia 3 (A-side)	
1985	"Il grande sogno di Maya"	"Rascal il mio amico orsetto"	Fivelandia 3	
1985	"Evelyn e la magia di un sogno d'amore"	"Nuovi amici a Ciao Ciao" (Note: Sung by Giorgia Passeri, Giancarlo Muratori and Piccolo Coro dell'Antoniano)	Fivelandia 3	
1985	"Kiss Me Licia"	"Che avventure a Bim Bum Bam con il nostro amico Uan" (Note: Sung by Paolo Bonolis, Manuela Blanchard, Giancarlo Muratori and Piccolo Coro dell'Antoniano)	Fivelandia 3	
1985	"Le avventure della dolce Katy"	"Lo strano mondo di Minù"	Fivelandia 3	
1985	"Occhi di gatto"	"Occhi di gatto (instrumental)"	Fivelandia 3	
1985	"Che bello essere un Puffo"	"Notte Puff"	Fivelandia 3 (A-side)	
1985	"Arrivano gli Snorky"	"Ciao siamo gli Snorky"	Fivelandia 3 (A-side); CantaSnorky (B-side)	
1985	"Memole dolce Memole"	"Memole dolce Memole (instrumental)"	Fivelandia 4	
1985	"Kiss Me Licia"	"Kiss Me Licia (instrumental)"	Fivelandia 3	Sold as a gift with Ai Shite Knight toys
1986	"Mila e Shiro due cuori nella pallavolo"	"Lovely Sara"	Fivelandia 4	
1986	"Magica, magica Emi"	"Holly e Benji due fuoriclasse" (Note: Sung by Paolo Picutti)	Fivelandia 4	
1986	"Love Me Licia"	"Il mago di Oz"	Fivelandia 4	
1986	"Noi Snorky incontrerai"	"Sempre sognerai"	Fivelandia 4 (A-side); CantaSnorky (B-side)	
1986	"David gnomo amico mio"	"Dai vieni qui David"	Fivelandia 4 (A-side); David gnomo amico mio (B-side)	
1986	"Puffa di qua puffa di là"	"Buon compleanno Grande Puffo"	Fivelandia 4 (A-side); Cristina D'Avena e i tuoi amici in TV 21 (B-side)	
1986	"Alla scoperta di Babbo Natale"	"Ninna nanna di Brahms"	Fivelandia 4 (A-side); Fai la nanna con Cicciobello (B-side)	
1987	"Vola mio mini Pony"	"Vola mio mini Pony (instrumental)"	Cristina D'Avena con i tuoi amici in TV	
1987	"Sandy dai mille colori"	"Lupin, l'incorreggibile Lupin (Note: Sung by Enzo Draghi)	Cristina D'Avena con i tuoi amici in TV (A-side); Cristina D'Avena e i tuoi amici in TV 2 (B-side)	
1987	"Licia dolce Licia"	"Juny peperina inventatutto"	Fivelandia 5	
1987	"Pollyanna	"Pollyanna (instrumental)"	Fivelandia 5	
1987	"Alice nel paese delle meraviglie"	"Alice nel paese delle meraviglie (instrumental)"	Fivelandia 5	
1987	"Jem"	"Gli amici Cercafamiglia"	Fivelandia 5	
1987	"Piccola bianca Sibert"	"Sibert"	Fivelandia 5 (A-side); Piccola, bianca Sibert (B-side)	
1987	"Teneramente Licia"	"Quando arrivi tu"	Fivelandia 5 (A-side); Teneramente Licia e i Bee Hive (B-side)	
1987	"Maple Town: un nido di simpatia"	"Patty e Bobby (chi trova un vero amico)"	Fivelandia 5 (A-side); Maple Town: un nido di simpatia (B-side)	
1987	"Ogni Puffo pufferà"	"Madre Natura"	Fivelandia 5 (A-side); Puffiamo all'avventura (B-side)	
1987	"Princesse Sarah"	"Princesse Sarah (instrumental)"		"Lovely Sara" song sung in French language
1988	"Hilary"	"Denny"	Cristina D'Avena e i tuoi amici in TV 2	
1988	"Che famiglia è questa family!"	"Fufur superstar"	Cristina D'Avena e i tuoi amici in TV 2	
1988	"Balliamo e cantiamo con Licia"	"Rimboccata dalla luna la città già dorme"	Fivelandia 6 (A-side); Balliamo e cantiamo con Licia (B-side)	
1988	"Principessa dai capelli blu"	"Kolby e i suoi piccoli amici"	Fivelandia 6	
1988	"Una per tutte, tutte per una"	"Una sirenetta fra noi"	Fivelandia 6	
1988	"Siamo quelli di Beverly Hills"	"Lady Lovely"	Fivelandia 6	
1988	"Palla al centro per Rudy"	"Prendi il mondo e vai"	Fivelandia 6	
1988	"Viaggiamo con Benjamin"	"Ben-Benjamin"	Fivelandia 6 (A-side); Viaggiamo con Benjamin (B-side)	
1988	"Arriva Cristina"	"Riuscirai"	Fivelandia 6 (A-side); Arriva Cristina (B-side)	
1988	"Puffi qua e là"	"Puffa una canzone"	Fivelandia 6 (A-side); Puffiamo all'avventura (B-side)	
1988	"D'Artagnan e i moschettieri del re"	"D'Artagnan e i moschettieri del re (instrumental)"	Cristina D'Avena e i tuoi amici in TV 3	
1989	"Milly un giorno dopo l'altro"	"È quasi magia, Johnny!"	Cristina D'Avena e i tuoi amici in TV 3	
1989	"Siamo fatti così - Esplorando il corpo umano"	"Questa allegra gioventù"	Cristina D'Avena e i tuoi amici in TV 3 (A-side); Fivelandia 7 (B-side)	
1989	"Evviva Palm Town"	"Evviva Palm Town (instrumental)"	Fivelandia 7	
1989	"Cristina"	"Cristina (instrumental)"	Fivelandia 7	
1989	"Ti voglio bene Denver"	"Piccolo Lord"	Fivelandia 7	
1989	"Conte Dacula"	"Ciao io sono Michael"	Fivelandia 7	
1989	"I Puffi sanno"	"I Puffi sanno (instrumental)	Fivelandia 7	
1989	"Dolce Candy"	"Teodoro e l'invenzione che non-va"	Fivelandia 7	
1989	"Sabato al circo"	"Sabato al circo (instrumental)"	Fivelandia 7	
1990	"Bobobobs"	"Bobobobs (instrumental)"	Cristina D'Avena e i tuoi amici in TV 4	
1990	"Alvin rock 'n' roll"	"Alvin rock 'n' roll (instrumental)	Cristina D'Avena e i tuoi amici in TV 4	
1990	"Zero in condotta"	"Un mondo di magia"	Cristina D'Avena e i tuoi amici in TV 4	
1990	"Le avventure di Teddy Rupxin"	"Le avventure di Teddy Rupxin (instrumental)"	Fivelandia 8	
1990	"Cri Cri"	"Cri Cri (instrumental)"	Fivelandia 8	
1990	"Al circo, al circo"	"Al circo, al circo (instrumental)"	Fivelandia 8	
1990	"Niente paura, c'è Alfred!"	"Niente paura, c'è Alfred (instrumental)"	Fivelandia 8	
1990	"Amici Puffi"	"Amici Puffi (instrumental)"	Fivelandia 8	
1991	"Peter Pan"	"Peter Pan (instrumental)"	Cristina D'Avena e i tuoi amici in TV 5	
1991	"Papà Gambalunga"	"Papà Gambalunga (instrumental)"	Fivelandia 9	
1991	"Il mistero della pietra azzurra"	"Il mistero della pietra azzurra (instrumental)"	Fivelandia 9	

== Singles published since 2009 ==
Year	Title	Format	Label	Album	Notes
2009	"Principesse gemelle"	Digital download	RTI	Cristina for You	
2009	"Puffa un po' di arcobaleno"	Digital download	RTI	Fivelandia 14	
2010	"Tutti abbiamo un cuore" (A-side); "Tutti abbiamo un cuore" (B-side)	45 rpm	TV-Pedia	Do re mi... five – Cantiamo con Five	Single distributed to TV-Pedia association members
2011	"Mila e Shiro il sogno continua"	Digital download	RTI	Le sigle originali dei cartoni di Italia 1	
2012	"Estate d'amore" (Note: Featuring Patrick Ray Pugliese)	Digital download	RTI, Crioma	30 e poi... Parte prima	
2012	"Cri Megamix"	Digital download	RTI	30 e poi... Parte prima	
2014	"Festivalmar"	Digital download	Crioma	Published only as single	
2015	"Il segreto (per Mariele)" (Note: With Piccolo Coro "Mariele Ventre" and Coro Le Verdi Note dell'Antoniano)	Digital download	Antoniano, Crioma	#le sigle più belle	
2017	"Noi Puffi siam così"	Digital download	Crioma	Published only as single	
2017	"L'estate migliore che c'è"	Digital download	Crioma	Published only as single	
2017	"Alza gli occhi e vai" (Note: Charity single sung with Enzo Draghi, Piero Cassano, Franco Fasano, Benedetta Iardella, Mirko & Carola Saglia, Ninni Carucci, Alessio Saglia, Paolo Picutti, Clara Serina, Giorgio Vanni and Paolo Tuci)	Limited edition CD, digital download		Published only as single	
2017	"Occhi di gatto" (Note: Featuring Loredana Bertè)	Digital download	Warner Music Italia	Duets - Tutti cantano Cristina	Featuring Loredana Bertè
2018	"Canzone dei Puffi" (Note: Featuring Patty Pravo)	Digital download	Warner Music Italia	Duets Forever - Tutti cantano Cristina	
2018	"Ti voglio bene Denver" (Note: Featuring Lo Stato Sociale)	Digital download	Warner Music Italia	Duets Forever - Tutti cantano Cristina	
2019	"All'arrembaggio!" (A-side); "Tutti all'arrembaggio" (Note: With Giorgio Vanni) (B-side)	Limited edition 45 rpm	Panini, RTI	Fivelandia 19 (A-side); Fivelandia 20 (B-side)	
2019	"Centouno Dalmatian Street"	Digital download	Walt Disney Records	101 Dalmatian Street (Musica dalla serie TV)	

== See also ==
- Cristina D'Avena albums discography
- List of theme songs recorded by Cristina D'Avena
