= Cristina D'Avena =

Italian singer and actress (born 1964)

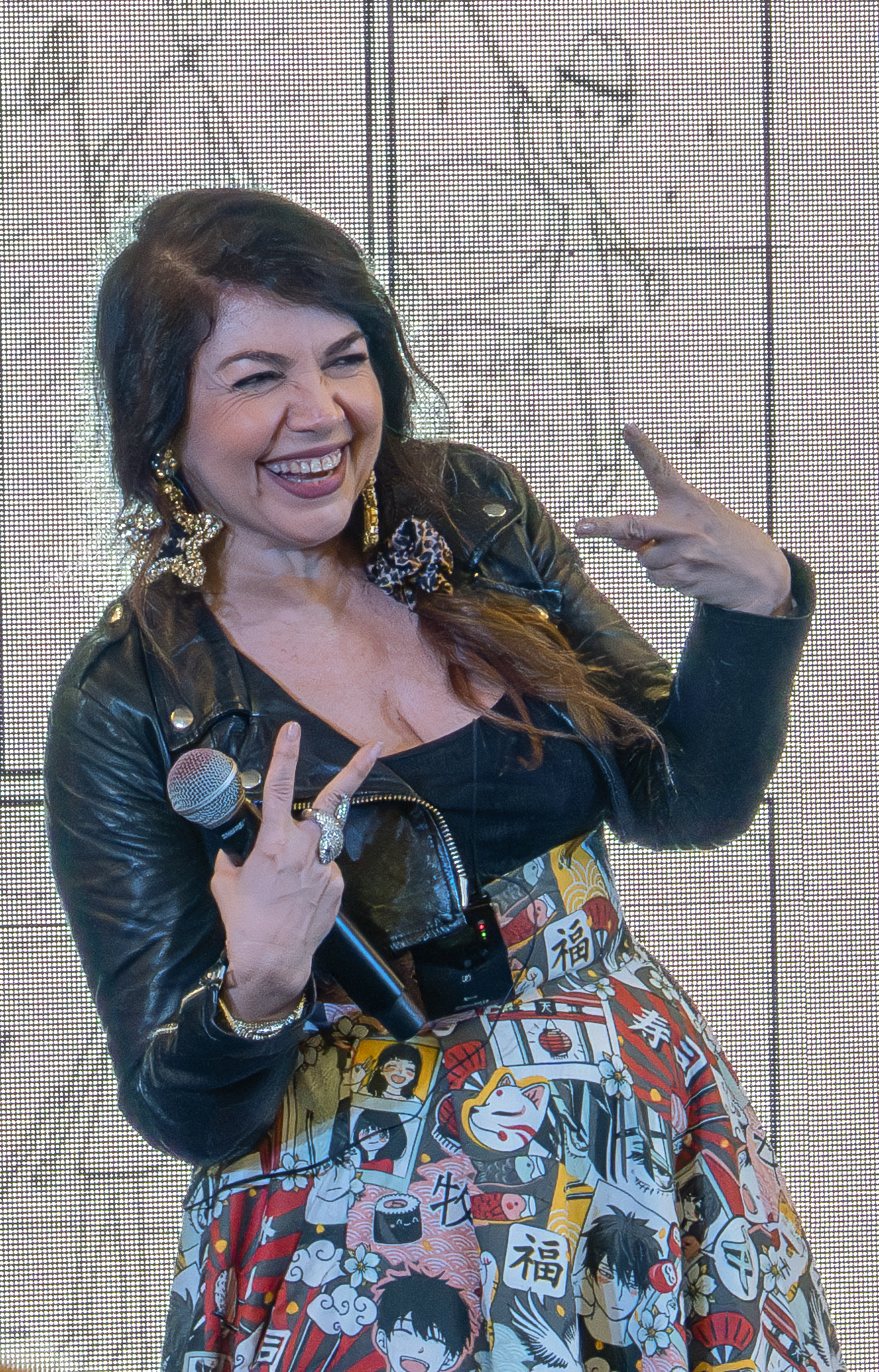
- D'Avena in 2024

Background information
- Born: 6 July 1964 (age 61); Bologna, Emilia-Romagna, Italy
- Genres: Pop; children's music; theme music; show tune
- Occupations: Actress; singer
- Instrument: Vocals
- Years active: 1981–present
- Website: www.cristinadavena.it

Cristina D'Avena (born 6 July 1964) is an Italian actress, singer and television personality. She has sold nearly 7 million copies of her albums.

D'Avena was selected to join the prestigious Institute of Antoniano choir, following her debut, Lo Zecchino d'Oro, at age three. In the early 1980s, she sang numerous anime theme songs, which were compiled into several successful albums. Around the same time, D'Avena made her debut as an actress. In 1986, she appeared in Love me Licia, an Italian adaptation of the Japanese manga Ai Shite Knight. D'Avena has been performing concerts in Italy since the late 1990s.

In 1987, D'Avena recorded the French version of the Italian theme song "Lovely Sara" (which she performed a few months earlier), intended to accompany the broadcast of Princesse Sarah, the first cartoon produced in Japan to be broadcast on French television network La Cinq.

From the end of the 80s, D'Avena began a more than ten-year and practically uninterrupted series of live performances in numerous places, from large arenas to shopping centres to street parties and small venues. In November 1989 and 1990, she held two concerts at the PalaTrussardi in Milan, which were attended by a total of around 20,000 spectators, while the one in 1992 at the FilaForum in Assago brought together 13,000 people in the room and 3,000 outside.

In 1989, she also began working as a television and radio presenter with the Saturday night variety show on Canale 5 Sabato al Circo, which won the Telegatto in the Children's Programmes category. The programme continued for four years, until 1992, when it changed title, network and programming day and became Il grande circo di Rete 4. Together with Gerry Scotti, Cristina D'Avena presented the 1989 New Year's Eve special on Canale 5, "L'allegria fa novanta", and the one from 1990, "Evviva l'allegria".

In the early 1990s, Cristina D'Avena was chosen for numerous programmes. Since 8 November 1992, she has hosted the children's version of Fiorello's Karaoke on Italia 1, Cantiamo con Cristina, broadcast at 8 pm on Sundays: in each episode, two teams compete to the tune of her theme songs. In the 1993/1994 season, she participated in the sixth edition of Buona Domenica alongside Gerry Scotti and Gabriella Carlucci, hosting Radio Cristina, the commentary column on letters and faxes sent by children, and performing in some musical and dance numbers (in these spaces he also has the opportunity to perform the songs from the newly released "Cristina Canta Disney" album). In the fifth edition of La sai l'ultima?, broadcast on Canale 5 in the 1995/1996 television season, hosted by Gerry Scotti and Paola Barale, she obtained the role of special correspondent travelling around Italy. Starting from 15 September 1996, for two years in a row, alternating weekly with Pietro Ubaldi, she hosted the programme of cartoons and telephone games Game Boat broadcast every day in the early evening on Rete 4; in this period, the fourteenth chapter of Fivelandia was also published, one of the singer's greatest successes, awarded platinum for over 100,000 copies sold.

While continuing her activity as a singer for the Mediaset networks, since 1998 Cristina D'Avena has worked as a presenter in Rai, first at the Zecchino d'Oro for three years until 2000 as co-presenter alongside Cino Tortorella and Milly Carlucci, and then from autumn 1998 with Andrea Pezzi she hosted the Friday night variety show on Rai 2 Serenate, created by Fabio Fazio who was initially supposed to be the host. In 1999 and 2000, she hosted two editions of Concerto di Primavera in April and Buon Natale a tutto il Mondo in December on Rai 1.

Furthermore, in this decade, D'Avena's fame went beyond the confines of television. In 1994, Mina included in her album Canarino mannaro a cover of a song written by her son Massimiliano Pani and originally sung by Cristina D'Avena in 1988 with the title "Sempre attento al regolamento"; for the occasion, the title and lyrics were changed, and the song became "Tu dimmi che città".

On 13 February 2016, Cristina D'Avena took part as a super guest in the final evening of the Festival di Sanremo singing a medley of hits.

In 2017, after 35 years of career with the Five Record/RTI Music label, Cristina D'Avena moved to the Warner Music Italy record company, taking a more general artistic direction. On 10 November 2017, the album Duets - Tutti cantano Cristina was released with some of his songs rearranged and recorded in duets, with 16 big names in Italian music. The operation was highly commercially successful and reached the top of the best-selling albums chart, obtaining gold status (25,000+ copies) after three weeks and platinum (50,000+ copies) on 2 January 2018. Duets made Cristina D'Avena the only woman in the top 20 best-selling albums in Italy in 2017.

On 8 February 2019, the singer was a guest on the fourth evening of the Festival di Sanremo, as a duet with Shade and Federica Carta in Senza farlo apposta, while on 8 March, "101 Dalmatian Street" was published, the artist's first theme song for a Disney animated series. In the summer, Netflix entrusted Cristina with "My Life Is Going On", the theme song for the TV show Money Heist, in which the singer makes a brief cameo dressed like the characters from the series.

== Career ==
=== Music career and theme songs for animated series ===
D'Avena's main line of work is recording theme songs for animated series. Overall, she has sung 743 songs, including theme songs for Miracle Girls, Sailor Moon, Kimagure Orange Road, Ai Shite Knight, Marmalade Boy, Ace o Nerae!, Touch, Pokémon, Attack No. 1, One Piece, Candy Candy, La Seine no Hoshi, Magic Knight Rayearth, Dr. Slump, Nadia: The Secret of Blue Water, Himitsu no Akko-chan, Little Women, Wedding Peach, Attacker You!, Glass Mask, Cardcaptor Sakura, Princess Sarah and Rose of Versailles. Cristina has also recorded songs for other television programs. The dubbed Italian songs she sings are not covers of the Japanese songs but newly written songs for the Italian dub of the anime. For the Italian dub of Mahou no Tenshi Creamy Mami, D'Avena both performed the theme songs and dubbed the singing voices of the character Creamy Mami and her rival Megumi Ayase. D'Avena has performed themes for live-action TV series and Western cartoon series such as Batman: The Animated Series, Count Duckula, The Mask, My Little Pony and Friends, The Smurfs, The Magic School Bus, The Snorks, Totally Spies, and Jem.

In December 2009, D'Avena released her Magia di Natale album, which includes 12 traditional Christmas songs, all arranged by Valeriano Chiaravalle. In this album, she sang in English for the first time. She also paid homage to the recently deceased Michael Jackson by including a cover of his song "Childhood". She later released another album dedicated to Christmas as well as special albums commemorating her 30th year in the music industry.

D'Avena has presented stories and created fairy tales through VHS tapes and audio CDs for De Agostini and other editions.

On 10 November 2017, following her contract with Warner Music Italy, she released her 76th album, Duets – Tutti cantano Cristina, which includes songs with Italian artists including Loredana Bertè, Emma Marrone, J-Ax, Giusy Ferreri, Annalisa, Francesca Michielin, Arisa and Michele Bravi. The album became her first number one album and received the platinum certification by Fimi.

On 23 November 2018, her 77th studio album Duets Forever – Tutti cantano Cristina was released, containing 16 duets with many singer-songwriters of Italian music, such as Il Volo, Elisa, Patty Pravo, Carmen Consoli, Federica Carta, Elodie, Nek, Max Pezzali and Alessandra Amoroso. The album reached number three on the Italian Albums Chart and is certified gold.

On 14 April 2023, Cristina was contacted by HoYoverse to sing the song "Ti cercherò" for Italy, the theme song for the video game "Genshin Impact".

=== Acting and television programmes ===
D'Avena performed the Italian theme song for the anime series, Ai Shite Knight (known in Italy as Kiss Me Licia). She also starred as the female lead, Licia (Yakko-chan), in four live-action drama sequels: Love me Licia, Licia, dolce Licia, Teneramente Licia, and Balliamo e cantiamo con Licia.

A four-season telefilm was created about D'Avena: Arriva Cristina, Cristina, Cri Cri and Cristina, l' Europa siamo noi. They were also hugely successful in the 1990s.

Cristina has been the presenter and the special guest of many TV programmes for children, such as Holyday on Ice, Sabato al Circo, Luna Party, L' Allegria fa '90, Bim Bum Bam, Buona Domenica, I Fatti Vostri, Lo Zecchino d' Oro, Game Boat, and Matricole e Meteore.

After co-hosting the TV programme Matricole e Meteore for Canale 5, from 2012 to 2013, D'Avena hosted two music-themed programmes on the TV channel Super!. In 2014, she was the voice of Beatrice in the Italian dub of Over the Garden Wall. She was a special guest in the 2016 edition of the Festival of Sanremo and was cast for the comedy TV program Colorado. On 16 February 2018, D'Avena returned to television as a member of the jury on the first edition of Sanremo Giovani, a teenage talent show hosted by Antonella Clerici.

On 25 October, she won the Telegatto for her 40-year career and on the occasion of her forty-year career, a compilation titled 40 - The Dream Continues on 25 November, which includes the original versions of her theme songs, unreleased singles and six new duets including Elettra Lamborghini, Lorella Cuccarini, Orietta Berti and Cristiano Malgioglio.

On 15 December 2022, she was among the guests who took the stage at a celebratory public event organized in Rome for the tenth anniversary of the political party Fratelli d'Italia. Her presence arouses bitter controversy among her fans, who consider the values usually communicated by D'Avena to be incompatible with those that characterize the political party, particularly in the field of civil rights, or accuse her of having used the label of "gay icon" without real merit. On stage the singer performs with a skirt in the colours of the rainbow flag and pronounces words in support of universal love, but at the end of the performance she receives and exhibits the sweatshirt of the political party.

== Filmography ==
=== Films ===
Year	Title	Role	Notes
1998	Cucciolo	Herself	Cameo appearance
2016	Il trenino Thomas - La grande corsa	Narrator (voice)	Italian dub; voice role
2017	Smurfs: The Lost Village	Smurf Willow (voice)	Italian dub; voice role
2019	Playmobil: The Movie	Fairy godmother (voice)	Italian dub; voice role

=== Television ===
Year	Title	Role	Notes
1981–2000	Bim bum bam	Herself/co-host	Children's programme
1985	Creamy Mami, the Magic Angel	Yū Morisawa/ Creamy (voice)	Lead role (singing voice only)
1986	Love Me Licia	Licia	Lead role; 34 episodes
1987	Licia dolce Licia	Licia	Lead role; 35 episodes
1987	Teneramente Licia	Licia	Lead role; 39 episodes
1988	Balliamo e cantiamo con Licia	Licia	Lead role; 36 episodes
1988	Arriva Cristina	Cristina	Lead role; 36 episodes
1989	Cristina	Cristina	Lead role; 36 episodes
1990	Evviva l'allegria	Herself/co-host	Variety show
1990–1991	Cri Cri	Cristina	Lead role; 72 episodes
1991	Cristina, l'Europa siamo noi	Cristina	Lead role; 36 episodes
1992–1993	Cantiamo con Cristina	Herself/host	Children's singing programme
1993–1994	Buona Domenica	Herself/co-host	Variety show (season 6)
1995	Buon Natale Bim bum bam	Herself	Special
1995–1996	La sai l'ultima?	Herself/ Interviewer	Variety show (season 4)
1997–1999	Game Boat	Herself/host	Children's programme (seasons 2–3)
1998–2000, 2017–present	Zecchino d'Oro	Herself/host	Talent show
2000	Concerto di primavera	Herself/ Performer	Special
2005	Those Scurvy Rascals	Narrator at the Opening	Italian dub; voice role
2010	Matricole & Meteore	Herself/ Recurring guest	Docuseries (season 2)
2014	Over the Garden Wall	Beatrice (voice)	Main role; 10 episodes (Italian Dub)
2016	Colorado	Herself/ Musical guest	Variety/comedy show (season 18)
2018	Sanremo Young	Herself/Judge	Talent show (season 1)
2021	Drag Race Italia	Herself/Guest judge	Episode: "Ciao Italia!"
2022	Il cantante mascherato	Herself/ Contestant	Talent show (season 3)
2023	Viva Rai2!	Various	Sketch comedy series

== See also ==
- The Smurfs music
- Zecchino d'Oro
- Piccolo Coro dell'Antoniano
