= Cristina (TV series) =

- Starring: Cristina D'Avena; Marco Bellavia
- Country of origin: Italy
- No. of seasons: 1
- No. of episodes: 36

Production
- Running time: 25 minutes

Original release
- Network: Italia 1
- Release: October 2 – December 22, 1989

Cristina is an Italian television series.

== See also ==
- List of Italian television series
