= Cristina, l'Europa siamo noi =

- Country of origin: Italy
- No. of seasons: 1
- No. of episodes: 36

Original release
- Network: Rete 4
- Release: September 23 – December 13, 1991

Cristina, l'Europa siamo noi (Cristina: We are Europe) is a television series broadcast on Rete 4 in autumn 1991 with Cristina D'Avena, directed by Francesco Vicario, within the program Cartonissimi. It is the last television series starring Cristina D'Avena.

== Plot ==
Cristina, Francesca, Julia, left home and moved it to Julia's grandparents, and then began working as a singer and television host, knowing Edward, a boy who becomes her manager.

== See also ==
- List of Italian television series
