= Cri Cri (TV series) =

- Country of origin: Italy
- No. of seasons: 2
- No. of episodes: 72

Original release
- Network: Italia 1
- Release: October 1, 1990 – February 13, 1991

Cri Cri is the third Italian television series starring Cristina D'Avena and Marco Bellavia, broadcast on Italy 1 between October 1990 and February 1991.

The show was aimed at audiences of various ages. Among the actors were also the future young musicians Massimo Varini, Eros Cristiani and Michele Monestiroli.

The show acts as a sequel to the show Cristina that, in turn, is the sequel to Arriva Cristina. Cri Cri is divided into two seasons: in the first, Cristina begins, together with Steve, Michele and Andrea (who will take the place of Marco) the internship in the clinic, while the second season will take place in the hospital with curious but very nice characters and in the meantime all the friends try to make money but end up putting us back until in the last episode everything is fixed for everyone.

== Theme and soundtrack ==
The theme song of the show is called Cri Cri, written by Carmelo "Ninni" Carucci and Alessandra Valeri Manera, and is sung by Cristina D'Avena herself. It is recorded as track 3 on the album Fivelandia 8. Within the series, before the final theme was held there were various sketches and commercials including The Thousand and a Fairytale, English junior and Exploring the Human Body....

His album Cri Cri was released, which contained all the songs interpreted in the series. In December 2010 the album was reissued for the first time on CD inside the box set Arriva Cristina Story, a 4-disc box containing the reissues of the soundtracks of the four Italian production shows inspired by the character of Cristina D'Avena.

The song "Merry Christmas" was also used on Channel 5 as the theme song for the song of the same name, which aired on December 24, 1990 and was conducted by Al Bano and Romina Power.

== Episode Titles ==
1. Il tirocinio
2. Un amico per tutti
3. Vietato fumare
4. Che pozione!
5. Malata... o no?
6. La supplente
7. Gioco di mano...
8. Prove generali
9. La spia
10. Venti d'amore
11. Pentimento
12. Lo scambio
13. Generosità
14. Ferie arretrate
15. Tata, dove vai?
16. Pizza per sempre
17. Zio Carlo super prof.
18. Il ritorno di Tata
19. La posta del cuore
20. Chi sarà?
21. Ecologia e superstizione
22. La fame vien mangiando
23. Filippo e lo sport
24. Piccole bugie
25. A.A.A. Casa cercasi
26. Luca, dove sei?
27. Sembra facile
28. Viva l'indipendenza
29. Nostalgia
30. Casa dolce casa
31. L'impostore
32. Le ziette
33. Antonella, ti voglio bene
34. Non vittima, ma eroe
35. Tentazioni...
36. Amici per sempre
37. Cristina, cosa fai?
38. Una balia per lo zio
39. Di male in peggio
40. Zio Carlo alla riscossa
41. Tutti miliardari
42. Quattro nuovi amici
43. Luca e l'enciclopedia
44. Il primo capello bianco
45. E questo chi è?
46. Alè oh oh
47. Due ragazzine vanitose
48. La lezione
49. Ritorno alla natura
50. Un disastro... alle erbe
51. Fiori d'arancio
52. Valeria e l'architetto
53. Zio Carlo cresce
54. Torna com'eri, zio!
55. Tata apprendista inventore
56. Lettere d'amore
57. La televisione è bella
58. Dov'è Cristina?
59. Sembra facile...
60. L'aggiustatutto
61. Il primo batticuore
62. Amore e bugie
63. Per sempre...
64. Una mamma in carriera
65. Il trio comico
66. Luci del varietà
67. Cosa farò da grande?
68. Le lumache
69. Asso di cuori
70. Formaggi a domicilio
71. Un metodo infallibile
72. Ciao a tutti!

== See also ==
- List of Italian television series
