= Arriva Cristina =

- Country of origin: Italy
- No. of seasons: 1
- No. of episodes: 36

Original release
- Network: Italia 1
- Release: 3 October – 23 December 1988

Arriva Cristina is an Italian television series.

== See also ==
- List of Italian television series
