= Licia =

Licia is an Italian feminine given name, and may refer to:

- Licia Albanese (1909–2014), Italian soprano
- Licia Boudersa (born 1992), French boxer
- Licia Calderón, Spanish actress and vedette
- Licia Colò (born 1962), Italian journalist
- Licia Fertz (born 1930), Italian nurse and social media influencer
- Licia Kokocinski, Australian politician
- Licia Macchini (1930–2018), Italian artistic gymnast
- Licia Maglietta (born 1954), Italian actress
- Licia Missori, Italian pianist and composer
- Licia Nunez, Italian television and movie actress
- Licia Ronzulli (born 1975), Italian medical worker and politician
- Licia Troisi (born 1980), Italian fantasy writer
- Licia Verde (born 1971), Italian astrophysicist and cosmologist

== See also ==
- Livia, an ancient Roman Empress
- Lycia, a historical region in Anatolia; sometimes spelled "Licia" in Church Latin
- Four Italian television series adaptations of the manga Ai Shite Knight
  - Love me Licia (1968), first season
  - Licia dolce Licia (1987), second season
  - Teneramente Licia, third season
  - Balliamo e cantiamo con Licia, fourth season
