= Licia dolce Licia =

Italian television series

- Created by: Alessandra Valeri Manera
- Starring: Cristina D'Avena; Pasquale Finicelli; Salvatore Landolina
- Country of origin: Italy
- No. of seasons: 1

Original release
- Network: Italia 1
- Release: 9 March – 29 May 1987

Licia dolce Licia is an Italian television series. It is one of the four live adaptations of the Japanese manga Ai Shite Knight. It is the sequel to Love me Licia and was followed by Teneramente Licia and Balliamo e cantiamo con Licia.

== Cast ==
Actor	Voice actor	Role
Cristina D'Avena	Donatella Fanfani	Licia (Yakko)
Pasquale Finicelli	Ivo De Palma (dialogues); Enzo Draghi (sing)	Mirko (Go)
Salvatore Landolina	Pietro Ubaldi	Marrabio (Shigemaro)
Sebastian Harrison	Gabriele Calindri	Satomi
Valerio Floriani	Paolo Torrisi	Andrea (Hashizo)
Francesca Cassola	Debora Magnaghi	Elisa (Kaoru)
Emanuela Pacotto	Emanuela Pacotto	Marika (Meiko)
Carlotta Brambilla	Valeria Falcinelli	Mary
Debora Magnaghi	Debora Magnaghi	Hitlegard
Manuel De Peppe	Luigi Rosa	Matt (Shin'ichi)
Marco Bellavia	Antonio Zanoletti	Steve (Hiroyuki)
Giovanni Colombo	Donato Sbodio	Tony (Eiji)
Vittorio Bestoso	Vittorio Bestoso	Jack the manager
Marina Grandi	Alessandra Karpoff	Manuela (Isuzu)
Giordano Garramone	Paola Tovaglia	Grinta (Gonta)
Simona Gelo	Patrizia Salmoiraghi	Carlotta
Sante Calogero	Riccardo Mantani	Grandpa Sam
Antonio Paiola	Antonio Paiola	Lauro
Federico Danti	Federico Danti	Vilfredo María
Emanuela Folliero	Daniela Trapelli	Denise
Dina Castigliego	Lia Rho Barbieri	Mother of Marrabio (Shigemaro)
Stefania Danesi	Graziella Porta	Diletta
Moreno Saporito	Franco Gamba	Teo
Gianni Mantesi	Gianni Mantesi	Mirko/Go's Professor
Martina Mondadori	Martina Mondadori	Martina
Cat (Uncredited)	Pietro Ubaldi	Juliano
Unknown (Uncredited)	Unknown (Uncredited)	Mr. Peterson

== See also ==
- List of Italian television series
