= Love me Licia =

- Genre: Comedy
- Created by: Alessandra Valeri Manera
- Developed by: Barda & Lumetti
- Directed by: Mario Cavazzuti
- Starring: Cristina D'Avena; Pasquale Finicelli; Salvatore Landolina
- Composer: Giordano Bruno Martelli
- Country of origin: Italy
- No. of seasons: 1
- No. of episodes: 34

Production
- Running time: 25 minutes

Original release
- Network: Italia 1
- Release: 6 October – 24 December 1986

Love me Licia is an Italian television series. It is the first of the four live adaptations of the Japanese manga Ai Shite Knight (known in Italy as Kiss Me Licia). Its sequels are Licia dolce Licia, Teneramente Licia, and Balliamo e cantiamo con Licia.

== Plot ==
Bee Hive, a musical group that left for the United States at the end of the animated series, return from America and then go on tour followed by their girlfriends. Licia suspects that Mirko, her boyfriend and frontman of the Bee Hive, has fallen in love with Mary, the group's manager, but the one who actually falls in love with her is Marrabbio, Licia's father. Marrabbio will literally lose his head for Mary and will do his best to woo her, often offering her inviting food he cooked, but he will have to compete against the younger and more handsome Vilfredo, whom he nicknamed "Boiled Artichoke". Vilfredo, however, will have a negative role in the series, because he will kidnap the cat Giuliano to obtain the recipe of Marrabbio's meatballs, only to be forgiven in the following series.

Miss Mary will have the power to sweeten the grumpy Marrabbio, to such an extent that he will be convinced to let Licia go to the beach with Mirko and the rest of Bee Hive, in order to be able to take care of Andrea. The grouchy father will follow his daughter to the beach anyway, where new adventures and comic skits will happen.

== Cast ==
Actor	Voice actor	Role
Cristina D'Avena	Donatella Fanfani (dialogues); Cristina D'Avena (sing)	Licia (Yakko)
Pasquale Finicelli	Ivo De Palma (dialogues); Enzo Draghi (sing)	Mirko (Go)
Salvatore Landolina	Pietro Ubaldi	Marrabio (Shigemaro)
Sebastian Harrison	Gabriele Calindri	Satomi
Luca Lecchi	Paolo Torrisi	Andrea (Hashizo)
Francesca Cassola	Debora Magnaghi	Elisa (Kaoru)
Emanuela Pacotto	Elisabetta Cucci	Marika (Meiko)
C. Brambilla Pisoni	Valeria Falcinelli	Miss Mary
Marco Bellavia	Sergio Romanò	Steve (Hiroyuki)
Manuel De Peppe	Luigi Rosa	Matt (Shin'ichi)
Giovanni Colombo	Federico Danti	Tony (Eiji)
Elisabetta Odino	Alessandra Karpoff	Manuela (Isuzu)
Debora Magnaghi	Debora Magnaghi	Hildegard
Sante Calogero	Riccardo Mantani	Grandpa Sam
Antonio Paiola	Antonio Paiola	Lauro
Augusto Di Bono	Augusto Di Bono	Lucas
Giordano Garramone	Alessandra Karpoff	Grinta (Gonta)
Clotilde Santamaria	Marcella Silvestri	Miss Katia
Federico Danti	Franco Gamba	Vilfredo María
Corrado	Corrado	Himself
Persian Cat (Uncredited)	Pietro Ubaldi	Juliano
Unknown (Uncredited)	Unknown (Uncredited)	Giovanni

== Production ==
Aishite Knight was very successful in Italy, so broadcasting company Fininvest decided to make, with the consent of the original producers, the show Love me Licia as a sequel of the anime.

Cristina D'Avena, who had sung the Italian opening of the original anime, would play Yakko, while Pasquale Finicelli was chosen for Go Kato. Although the two were both singers, Finicelli's voice is never heard in the show while D'Avena's voice was only used for one song. This is because all the actors of the show were voiced by the voice actors of the characters they played, so Cristina D'Avena was dubbed in the parts spoken by Donatella Fanfani, while Finicelli was voiced by Ivo De Palma in the dialogues and, in the sung parts, by Enzo Draghi. The character of Lauro was played by his voice actor (Antonio Paiola), so he was not dubbed. Characters invented specifically for the show were also equally voiced except for Lucas (Bee Hive's new manager) and Hildegard (a German girl) who were voiced by their actors. The interpreters of Shigemaro and Grandpa Sam (Salvatore Landolina and Sante Calogero respectively), despite being both professional voice actors, were voiced by Pietro Ubaldi and Riccardo Mantani.

The show is affected by the influence of the original anime much more than the other three future ones, especially for the look of the characters (Yakko, for example, had bobbed hair like in the anime, although in later series they will become smooth).

== Differences from the original anime ==
- Aishite Knight is set in Japan, while from the dialogues of Grandpa Sam and Hildegard it is understood that the TV series is set in Italy.
- All the places that appear in the series (Shigemaro's restaurant, Yakko's house, the Bee Hive rehearsal room, Go's house and the kindergarten where Hashizo, Kaoru and Gonta go) are different from the anime.
- Hashizo and Satomi have blue and purple hair respectively in the anime; in Love me Licia, they both have brown hair.
- Go does not wear earrings unlike in the anime, where he wore them very often.
- Shin'ichi has a totally different hairstyle from his anime counterpart and has a bigger role alongside Hiroyuki.
- In Love me Licia Go, Satomi and Shigemaro do not smoke.
- Grandpa Sam and Lauro have major comic relief roles in Love me Licia.
- Eiji in Love me Licia never wears sunglasses.
- Hashizo's birthday in Aishite Knight is July 7 while in Love me Licia it is December.
- At the end of the original anime Yakko and Go promise to get married when the latter returns from United States, having also had the consent of Shigemaro. In the live action show, Shigemaro is again opposed to the marriage between the two.
- Juliano has a very active comedic role in Aishite Knight, often resulting in wacky comic relief; in Love me Licia he instead stays in the background, making cynical and sarcastic remarks about the current situation.
- The TV show is less dramatic, more sentimental and child-friendly.

== Soundtrack ==
The initial and final theme song of the show was written by Giordano Bruno Martelli and Alessandra Valeri Manera and sung by Cristina D'Avena.

== Filming ==
The interiors of the series were shot in the former studios of Merak Film S.r.l. while the exteriors in the park of Brugherio both in Cologno Monzese.

The Bee Hive concerts were shot in a former disco in Jesolo and Igloo in Varallo.

== New characters ==
The show features new characters invented specifically for it.

- Lucas: the manager of Bee Hive, replacing Yamadazaka. Played and voiced by Augusto Di Bono.
- Miss Mary: the foreign manager by Bee Hive. Shigemaro falls in love with her and tries to make him eat her meatballs. Played by C. Brambilla Pisoni and voiced by Valeria Falcinelli.
- Vilfredo María: initially introduced as a Spanish womanizer, he turns out to be an industrial informant of a company who will try to find out Shigemaro's secret recipes then being unmasked. As a result, he kidnaps the cat Juliano promising to give him back if he is told the recipe but he will be stopped. Played by Federico Danti and voiced by Franco Gamba.
- Hildegard: a friend of the protagonists from West Germany, with a talent for mimicking voices. Played and voiced by Debora Magnaghi.
- Giovanni: a war veteran who will help the protagonists in finding Juliano. The actor who played it he's unknown.

=== Existing characters ===
- Corrado: a TV host who hosts the show where Bee Hive perform. Played by himself
- Kim Basinger: an actress who should have had a pool date with Shin'ichi. She is mentioned only by Shin'ichi.

== See also ==
- List of Italian television series
