= Torrisi =

Torrisi is an Italian surname. Notable people with the surname include:

- David Torrisi (born 1968), American attorney and politician
- Laura Torrisi (born 1979), Italian actress
- Nedelle Torrisi, American musician
- Paolo Torrisi (1951–2005), Italian voice actor and actor
- Pietro Torrisi (born 1940), Italian stuntman and actor
- Stefano Torrisi (born 1971), Italian former footballer

== See also ==
- Torrisi (restaurant), New York City
