= The Dynamite Brothers =

1949 Italian animation film

- Original Italian theatrical release poster
- Directed by: Nino Pagot; Toni Pagot
- Written by: Nino Pagot; Toni Pagot
- Produced by: Nino Pagot; Toni Pagot
- Starring: Aldo Silvani
- Cinematography: Franz Birtzer; Toni Pagot; Bruno Panozzo; Marco Visconti
- Music by: Giuseppe Piazzi
- Animation by: Toni Pagot; Ferdinando Palermo
- Layouts by: Osvaldo Cavandoli; Osvaldo Piccardo
- Backgrounds by: Background design: Ugo Heinze; Sergio Toffolo
- Color process: Technicolor
- Release date: December 17, 1949
- Country: Italy
- Language: Italian

I fratelli Dinamite (internationally released as The Dynamite Brothers) is a 1949 Italian animation film directed by Nino and Toni Pagot.

It is considered the first Italian feature-length animated film and the first Italian film in Technicolor together with La Rosa di Bagdad by Anton Gino Domeneghini which was also released in 1949. The production of the film began in 1942, and it was held back by a bombing that destroyed original drawings for the film.

The film premiered at the 10th Venice International Film Festival.

== Plot ==
The story revolves around these three wacky siblings; Din, Don, and Dan, who go on such adventures through their pranking and love of music. They were first stranded in Africa as toddlers, after a storm wrecked their ship and later being raised by wild animals (including a female buffalo), but they've been captured by fur-trappers and then brought back to their homeland, trying to fit in with society (including going to school). They were also held prisoner by a red devil-like villain, who kidnaps children and puts them into magical costumes.

The siblings found out that the devil's only weakness is music. They defeated the devil, free the other children, and blew up his castle, later returning home in time for Christmas. The brothers, taking an interest in musical talent, decided to become musicians. So, they found a double bass and joined the orchestra, during the performance of a brilliant piano concerto, performed by a great concert pianist. The Dynamite siblings ending up causing mayhem at the concert (such as by switching the sheet music with the other players, causing their instruments to sound completely ridiculous with the harp turning into a hideous skeletal figure, plus destroying the entire concert hall in progress).

They traveled to Venice during Carnival as they entered a singing contest (turning their bass fiddle into a musical gondola, while lip-syncing to "La Bondina in Gondoleta" on a hidden gramophone). Meanwhile, they saw a little girl crying because, she lost her doll in the canal. The three ending up starting a riot at the winning ceremony and the two judges drowned as they're escaping the angry mob. Later at night, Din, Don, and Dan jumped off a bridge (thinking they've committed suicide) and finding the girl's doll at the bottom of the canal. They gave the sad child back her toy and saw that their double bass was destroyed during the riot earlier. Suddenly, they saw a beam of moonlight shining through the clouds. One of the brothers took their bass, lining up the broken instrument with the moonbeam, and imagined playing a beautiful melody, as the film concludes with the brothers in heaven for their good deeds.
