= Masashi Amenomori =

Japanese actor (1930–1984)

- 雨森 雅司
- Born: Masao Amenomori (雨森 雅夫); July 24, 1930; Chiba Prefecture, Japan
- Died: April 9, 1984 (aged 53); Kawasaki, Kanagawa, Japan
- Other name: Ame-san (アメさん)
- Occupations: Actor; voice actor
- Years active: 1950–1983
- Agent: Aoni Production

Masashi Amenomori (雨森雅司, Amenomori Masashi; born Masao (雅夫), July 24, 1930 – April 9, 1984) was a Japanese actor and voice actor.

== Death ==
Amenomori died of cirrhosis on April 9, 1984. At the time of his death he was represented by Aoni Production.

== Notable voice work ==
- Ai Shite Knight (Juliano) final role
- Gatchaman (Debu)
- Time Bokan Series
  - Time Bokan (Hassan, Genghis Khan)
  - Otasukeman (Bunzaemon)
- Tensai Bakabon Series (Bakabon's Papa)
- Dr. Slump and Arale-chan (Komatta-chan)
- Doraemon NTV version (Sensei)
- Do It! Yasuji's Pornorama (Busuo's father)
- Pāman (Ohyama-sensei)
- Dog of Flanders (Michel)
- Magical Princess Minky Momo (Lilly's Papa)
- Future Boy Conan (Mou)
- Moomin (The Hemulen)
- Norakuro (Buru)
- Princess Knight (Duke Jeralmin)
- Andersen Stories (Circus Owner, Anna's Father)

== Replacements ==
After Amenomori's death, his roles were given to the following:

- Minoru Yada (Tanoshii Moomin Ikka: The Hemulen)
- Kousei Tomita (Heisei Tensai Bakabon: Bakabon's Papa)
- Hisahiro Ogura (Rerere's Tensai Bakabon: Bakabon's Papa)
- Shingo Kanemoto (Ai Shite Knight: Juliano)

== Dubbing Actors ==
=== Ward Bond ===
- The Wings of Eagles (John Dodge) (1973 Tokyo Channel 12 Dub)
- 3 Godfathers (Sheriff Buck Sweet) (1974 NET Dub)
- The Searchers (Rev. Capt. Samuel Johnson Clayton) (1973 NET Dub)
- The Long Gray Line (Captain Herman Koehler) (1972 NET Dub)
- Mister Roberts (Chief Petty Officer Dowdy) (1974 NET Dub)
- Rio Bravo (Pat Wheeler) (1977 NET Dub)

=== Fernando Sancho ===
- Per Il Gusto Di Uccidere (Sánchez) (1972 Fuji TV Dub)
- Django Shoots First (Gordon) (Unknown TV Dub)

== Dubbing Roles ==
=== Films ===
- Warlords of Atlantis (Grogan) (1981 TV Asahi Dub)
- To Kill a Mockingbird (Reverend Sykes) (1972 NET Dub)
- Zorro (Sergeant García) (1977 NET Dub)
- Day of Anger (Sheriff Nigel) (1970 NET Dub)
- Fighting Mad (Jeff Hunter) (1980 TBS Dub)
- Some Like It Hot (Little Bonaparte) (1967 NET Dub)
- The Wolf Man (Lawrence Talbot) (1964 NET Dub)
- How to Steal a Million (Charles Bonnet) (TV Tokyo Dub)
- The Cassandra Crossing (Max the Conductor) (1979 NTV Dub)
- The Enemy Below (Oberleutnant zur See "Heinie" Schwaffer) (1980 TV Asahi Dub)
- The Brides of Dracula (Doctor Tobler) (1975 Fuji TV Dub)
- Madigan (Chief of Detectives Hap Lynch) (1978 TV Asahi Dub)
- The Getaway (Cowboy) (1982 TV Asahi Dub)
- The Paleface (TV Kanagawa Dub)
- The Godfather Part II (Frank Pentangeli) (1980 NTV Dub)
- A Dandy in Aspic (Unknown TV Dub)
- Psycho (Al Chambers) (1975 Fuji TV Dub)
- Samson and Delilah (1971 Fuji TV Dub)
- The Quiet Man (Squire "Red" Will Danaher) (1971 Fuji TV Dub)
- Kill Them All and Come Back Alone (Fuji TV Dub)
- The Seven Year Itch (1973 Fuji TV Dub)
- The Day of the Jackal (Montclair) (1977 NTV and 1978 TV Asahi Dubs)
- Witness for the Prosecution (Wilfred Roberts) (1972 NET Dub)
- After The Fox (Okra) ( TV Asahi Dub)
- Long Live Your Death (Max Lozoya) (Unknown TV Dub)
- Sabata (Carrincha) (1976 TBS Dub)
- Casino Royale (Le Cheffre) (1972 NTV Dub)
- Mutiny on the Bounty (Alexander Smith) (1974 NET Dub)
- The Bridge on The River Kwai (Private Grogan) (1976 Fuji TV Dub)
- St. Ives (Blunt) (1982 Fuji TV Dub)
- Return of the Seven (Frank) (1974 NET Dub, plays Francisco Lorca in the 1976 TBS Dub)
- Beneath The Planet of the Apes (Adiposo) (1974 TBS Dub)
- Tarzan And The Great River (Unknown TV Dub)
- All the President's Men (Harry M Rosenfield) (1980 TBS Dub)
- Tobruk (1971 NET Dub)
- Smokey and the Bandit (Big Enos) (1982)
- Django Kill!... If You Live, Shoot! (Sorrow) (1977 TBS Dub)
- Around the World in 80 Days (Inspector Fix) (1972 NET Dub)
- The Delicate Delinquent (Captain Riley) (Fuji TV Dub)
- The Plainsman (1971 NET Dub)
- Pocketful of Miracles (Junior) (1970 NET Dub)
- Mackenna's Gold (1979 TV Asahi Dub)
- Guess Who's Coming to Dinner (Mr. Prentice) (Unknown TV Dub)
- Le Roi de Cœur (1974 NET Dub)
- My Name is Nobody (John) (1980 Fuji TV Dub)
- The Italian Job (Professor Simon Peach) (In-Flight Screening Version)
- The Great Northfield Minnesota Raid (Allen) (1976 NET Dub)
- Too Late the Hero (Unknown TV Dub)
- For a Few Dollars More (Sancho Perez) (1973 NET Dub)
- The Young Master (Ah Suk) (1983 Fuji TV Dub)
- Sergeant York ("Pusher" Ross) (1967 NET Dub)
- Who Is Killing the Great Chefs of Europe? (Louis Cohner) (1982 Fuji TV Dub)
- The Wild Geese (Regimental Sergeant Major Sandy Young) (1980 TV Asahi)
- The Wild Bunch (Coffer) (1974 NET Dub)
- Valdez Is Coming (El Segundo)
- Watership Down (Chief Rabbit of Sandleford)
