= ZZ's Clam Bar =

American seafood restaurant

- Interactive map of ZZ's Clam Bar

Restaurant information
- Established: 2013
- Closed: 2023
- Location: 169 Thompson Street, Manhattan, New York City, New York, 10012
- Coordinates: 40°43′39.7″N 74°0′1.6″W

ZZ's Clam Bar was a seafood restaurant in New York City. The restaurant, run by Major Food Group, was on the same street as their restaurant Carbone. ZZ's Clam Bar received a Michelin star in 2014, and retained the rating until 2022. The restaurant closed in 2023.

== History ==
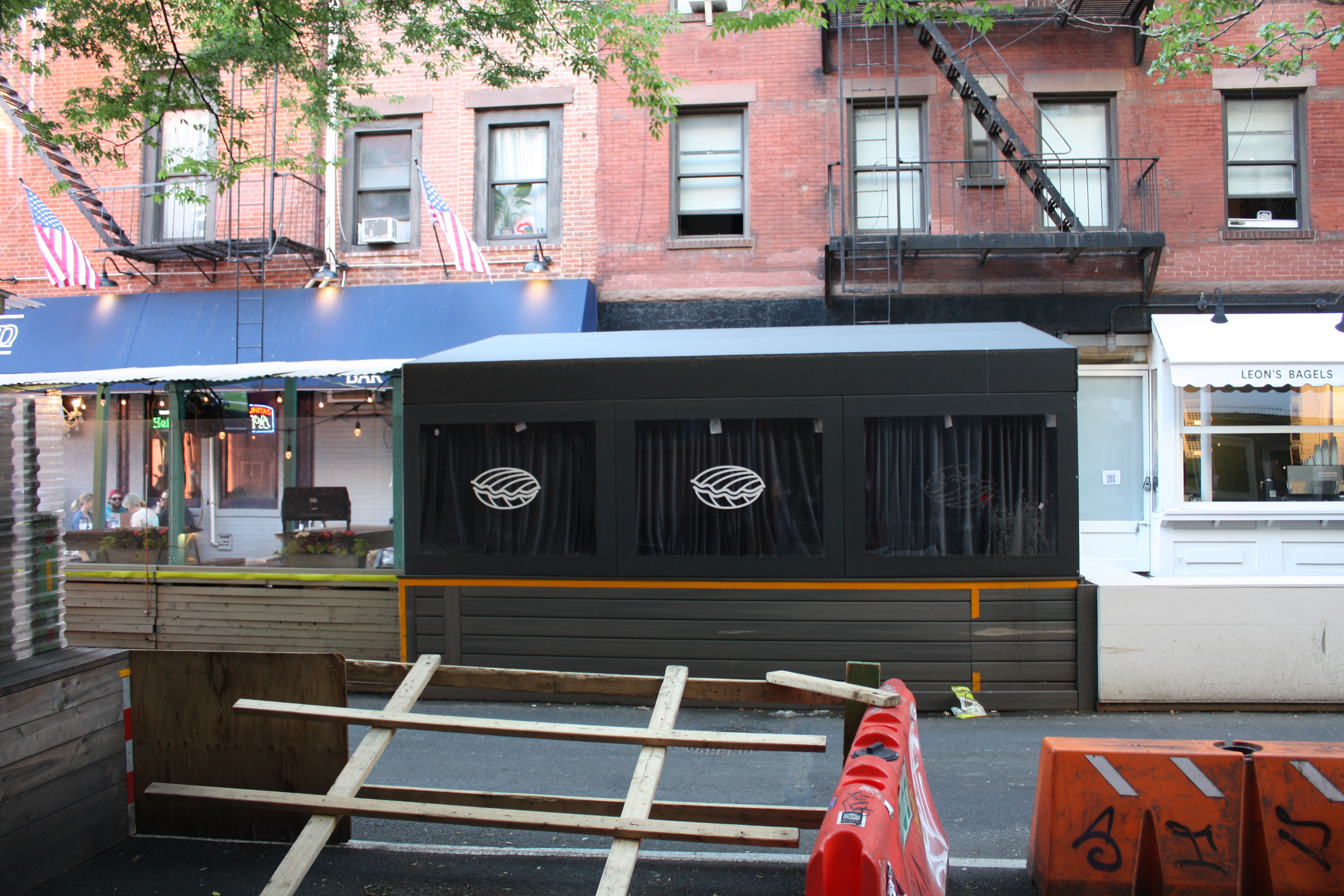
ZZ's Clam Bar's outdoor dining structure in May 2022

Major Food Group originally planned to open The Lobster Club, a sandwich shop, in the space occupied by ZZ's Clam Bar. The Lobster Club menu would have included "triple-decker sandwiches" and would have incorporated a take-out counter. Jeff Zalaznick, a partner in Major Food Group, claimed the change to the more formal seafood menu of ZZ's Clam Bar was in part due to the founding team consuming "so many lobster club sandwiches we didn't even want to look at one anymore" during the process of planning the restaurant. Major Food Group later opened a restaurant using the "Lobster Club" name, located in the Seagram Building. The Lobster Club does not resemble the restaurant originally planned for ZZ's Clam Bar's space; the organization refers to the restaurant as a "Japanese brasserie".

ZZ's Clam Bar opened in 2013, and the inaugural menu included trout crudo, prawn ceviche, and seared fish. Thomas Waugh, a "barman" at Carbone and Death & Co. known for creating elaborate cocktails, also initially operated the bar at ZZ's Clam Bar. Major Food Group leased the spaces for ZZ's Clam Bar and Carbone from the same landlord, and was able to obtain a favorable lease as no one could previously find a use for the small space. The 200 square foot space seats twelve people. The restaurant's founders have said it "celebrates" Umbertos Clam House, another Manhattan seafood restaurant founded in 1972 and located in Little Italy. In 2014, The New York Times referred to ZZ's Clam Bar as a "raw-bar-and-haute-cocktail-saloon", along with New York City establishments the Leadbelly and Maison Premiere.

=== Adam Platt ejection ===
Early in the restaurant's history, critic Adam Platt was ejected while eating by "a very large bouncer". Platt had previously given Carbone a one-star review, and assumed the ejection was "retribution" for doing so. Platt has contrasted Major Food Group's apparently retaliatory reaction with a softer one from Danny Meyer after Platt wrote a negative review of Meyer's restaurant Blue Smoke. Meyer approached Platt after the review was published and informed him the negative review was "very helpful". Major Food Group's senior staff has not commented on Platt's removal.

=== Replacement and closure ===
In 2022, Major Food Group opened a Miami restaurant, ZZ's Sushi Bar, which has been referred to as "a hybrid version of [...] ZZ's Clam Bar and a sushi and private members club." In 2023, Major Food Group opened a private member's club, ZZ's Club, in Hudson Yards. Major Food Group closed ZZ's Clam Bar in 2023, replacing it with a private dining space for Carbone. In comments provided to Eater, Major Food Group positioned the new ZZ's Club as a continuation and evolution of ZZ's Clam Bar.

== Reviews and accolades ==
=== Reviews ===
Critics have noted the restaurant's high prices. Ryan Sutton, in a review for Bloomberg, praised the food and the cocktails by Waugh, but stressed the costs of both. As a counterpoint to the higher-cost items, Sutton highlighted the market-price clams as "one way to enjoy a Champagne setting on a beer budget". Despite an overall positive review, Sutton did fault the restaurant for not replacing utensils between courses given the costs. Alan Richman, writing for GQ, echoed this concern, writing the restaurant needed to "upgrade the experience" given the expensive offerings.

=== Accolades ===
The restaurant earned a Michelin star for the first time in 2014, which it retained until 2022.

== See also ==
- List of Michelin-starred restaurants in New York City
