= Toni Pagot =

Italian comics artist (1921–2001)

- Born: Antonio Pagotto; 16 December 1921; Milan
- Died: 7 July 2001 (aged 79); Roncello, Province of Monza and Brianza
- Occupation(s): comics artist, animator, writer, cartoonist, director
- Years active: 1938–2001

Toni Pagot (16 December 1921 – 7 July 2001) was an Italian comic artist, animator, writer, cartoonist and director, most famous as the creator of Calimero and Grisù.

== Life and career ==
Born Antonio Pagotto in Milan, in collaboration with his elder brother Nino, Pagot started his career in the fields of comics, animation and advertising. After the Second World War, the two brothers created with The Dynamite Brothers, the first Italian feature-length animated film and the first Italian film in Technicolor. In 1963, the Pagot brothers created their main successful character, the black chick Calimero. In the 1970s, Pagot turned to work as a comic artist for Il Corriere dei Piccoli, Il Giornalino and Il Corriere dei Ragazzi. He was also co-creator and director of the animated series Grisù.

His nephew Marco Pagot and niece Gi Pagot also work in animation. They collaborated in the production of Hayao Miyazaki's Sherlock Hound, and other Italo-Japanese productions including Soccer Fever, Montana Jones, and Reporter Blues.
