= Umbertos Clam House =

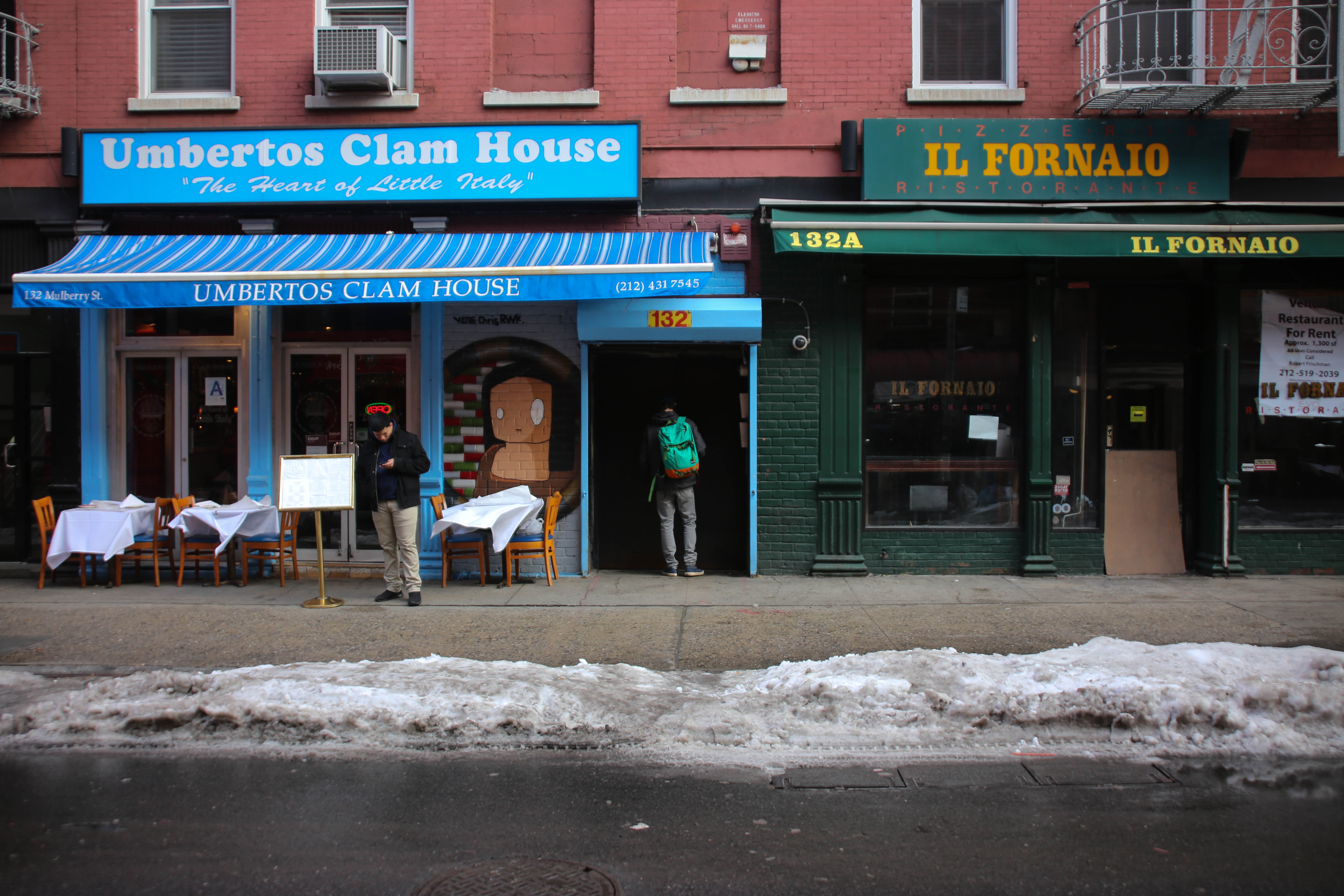
- The restaurant's exterior in 2014
- Interactive map of Umbertos Clam House

Restaurant information
- Established: 1972; 54 years ago
- Owner: Robert Ianniello
- Food type: Italian, seafood
- Location: 132 Mulberry Street (between Grand Street and Hester Street) in Little Italy in Manhattan, New York City, 10013
- Coordinates: 40°43′6.33″N 73°59′51.53″W
- Website: www.umbertosclamhouse.com

Umbertos Clam House is an Italian seafood restaurant located at 132 Mulberry Street in Little Italy in Manhattan, New York City. Umbertos became known for its "tasty dishes of calamari, scungilli, and mussels", but initially became prominent, weeks after opening, for being the site of the murder of gangster Joe Gallo. The restaurant was founded and is owned by members of the Ianniello family.

== History ==
The restaurant, founded by Umberto Ianniello, opened in 1972 at 129 Mulberry Street at the northwest corner of Mulberry and Hester streets. It was both the hangout of Umberto's son, reputed Mafia leader Matthew ("Matty the Horse") Ianniello and (according to Judge Edward Weinfeld of the Federal District Court in Manhattan) secretly owned by Matthew.

On April 7, 1972—two months after opening—New York gangster Joe Gallo was shot and killed at the restaurant, a killing The New York Times dubbed "one of the more sensational Mafia murders in New York City in recent history". His party of family and friends (including his daughter, wife, and bodyguard) had stopped for an early morning snack after celebrating his 43rd birthday at the Copacabana. A rival gangster spotted him and sent in hitmen shortly after Gallo was seated at a butcher block table in a back corner. After sustaining five shots, Gallo stumbled out into the street and died.

Matthew was at the cash register that night but fled to the kitchen and missed the entire attack; he later claimed no prior knowledge of the attack and was not charged concerning it. As The Nevada Daily Mail reported: "the proprietor dove into the kitchen and lay on the tile floor with his hands over his eyes as soon as Sonny Pinto and two out-of-town torpedoes known only as Cisco and Benny came in the side door blasting. The next thing he knew, Pete "The Greek" Diopoulis, a Gallo bodyguard, was pushing a gun in his face and pulling the trigger but only clicks came out because it had been emptied trying to save Joey."

In 1986, Matthew Ianniello was sentenced to six years in prison on a racketeering charge that involved skimming over $2 million from bars and restaurants (including Umbertos Clam House, the Peppermint Lounge, and a topless bar called the Mardi Gras, all in Manhattan), secretly owned by him, his business partner Benjamin Cohen of North Hills, Long Island, and seven associates.

Between 1986 and 1994, the federal government oversaw the restaurant's financial operations and daily operations, after trial evidence led them to believe that money was being skimmed. In 1994, with the restaurant suffering increasing losses, the establishment's control was turned over to the current owner, Matthew's younger brother, Robert Ianniello, who is listed as the restaurant's principal owner.

In November 1996, the restaurant was closed due to a lack of funds and the building was sold. Umbertos reopened in May 2000, at 178 Mulberry Street (on the corner of Broome Street), two blocks north of the original location. In 2010, Umbertos moved to its current location, just a few spots north of the original site. Today, the Ristorante Da Gennaro occupies the original location of Umbertos Clam House.

The founders of ZZ's Clam Bar have said it "celebrates" Umbertos Clam House.

== In popular culture ==
The Mafia hit and its locale were recalled in media coverage of the death of the actor Jerry Orbach, who became friends with "Crazy Joe" Gallo after playing a character who was modelled on him in the movie, The Gang That Couldn't Shoot Straight (1971), based on a novel by Jimmy Breslin.

The song "Joey" by Bob Dylan from his 1976 album Desire references Umberto's and the Gallo incident. The song is an epic loosely based on Gallo's life, and contains the lyric "One day they blew him down/In a clam bar in New York".

In a 1989 interview, Jerry Garcia stated that he would try to eat at Umbertos every time he played in New York, chuckling "they try to get a picture of me up there with Frank Sinatra and The Pope!"

As of January 2005, the Zagat Survey restaurant guide notes: "patrons of Umbertos are often tourists 'who expect the Sopranos cast to arrive.'"

Umbertos was featured in Martin Scorsese's film The Irishman (2019), where Gallo's hit was dramatized.

It also features on the reverse of the Southside Johnny & the Asbury Jukes album, Hearts of Stone, showing the band eating outside.

The original 129 Mulberry Street location can be seen in the 1984 film Ghostbusters, during the montage.

== See also ==
- List of Italian restaurants
- List of seafood restaurants
