= Grisù =

Italian animation series

- Created by: Toni Pagot; Nino Pagot
- Written by: Toni Pagot; Nino Pagot
- Directed by: Toni Pagot
- Starring: Paolo Torrisi; Germano Longo; Gino Pagnani; Isa Di Marzio
- Theme music composer: Ferdinando Palermo
- Country of origin: Italy
- Original language: Italian
- No. of seasons: 2
- No. of episodes: 52

Production
- Running time: 13min

Original release
- Network: RAI
- Release: 1964 – 1975

Grisù il draghetto is an animated Italian television series whose title character is Grisù, a dragon.

== Creation ==
The character was created by the Italian brothers Nino and Toni Pagot (best known as the creators of Calimero). It first appeared in a 1964 black-and-white animated series of commercial shorts for the Mentafredda Caremoli candies, part of the television program Carosello. A television series consisting of 52 episodes with the adventures of Grisù aired for the first time in 1972. The character also named a series of book for children.

== Characters ==
- Grisù: the main protagonist of the series. He's a young dragon that, despite being the youngest of a large breed of dragons, the Draconis, dreams of becoming a firefighter. In the original Italian version, he was voiced by Paolo Torrisi.
- Fume: Grisù's dad, he loves everything that contains fire and hates his son's aspiration to become a firefighter. In the original Italian version, he was voiced by Germano Longo.
- Sir Cedric: Fume and Grisù's human neighbour. He often finds recommendations for Grisù to do the most difficult jobs. In the original Italian version, he was voiced by Gino Pagnani.
- Lady Rowena: Sir Cedric's wife. In the original Italian version, she was voiced by Isa Di Marzio.
- Stuffy: Sir Cedric's dog. His role is sometimes served between the guardian and the butler.
- Krazy: Grisù's girlfriend. She comes from the planet Dracone. Unlike Grisù or his dad Fume, she doesn't spit flames from her mouth. She's small and can't speak, but she expresses herself through various types of sounds.
- Torvo the bird: one of Fume and Grisù's neighbours. He's a Scottish bird, who lives near the nobleman, who despite trying to escape the dragon (Grisù) every time, he's invariably hit by a flame.

== Revival ==
On November 18, 2020, it was announced that a CGI revival of the series was in the works which was being produced by Italian animation production studio Mondo TV, German production & distribution unit ZDF Enterprises and German animation studio Toon2Tango (which they hold a partnership with Mondo TV in 2019) with Mondo TV's Spanish and French divisions handling pre and post production of the show as ZDF Enterprises handling worldwide distribution outside except some territories where Toon2Tango and Mondo TV will distribute it those territories. The show was released on December 4, 2023, and it currently airs on Rai Yoyo, Kika, Canal+ Kids and JimJam.

== International broadcast ==
- Italy
  - Rai 1
  - Rai 2
  - Boomerang
  - Boing
- Germany
  - ZDF
  - ARD
  - Pro7
  - Sat.1
  - Kabel 1
  - Nickelodeon
- France
  - TF1
  - Canal+
  - M6
  - Canal J
  - France 3
- Canada
  - Ici Radio-Canada Télé
  - TVOntario
- Czech Republic
  - ČST1 (dubbed into Czech as 'Příhody dráčka Soptíka')
  - ČST2
- Slovakia
  - ČST1 (dubbed into Slovak as 'Dráčik'. There was another dub which was made in 2008 for DVD releases.)
- South Africa
  - SABC1 as 'Groenie die drakie' (Little green the little dragon) dubbed into Afrikaans
- Arab League
  - Various regional channels in the Arab League countries (Dubbed into Arabic as 'التنين الصغير' (at-tinnīn aṣ-ṣaghīr)
  - ART Children
  - Qatar Television
- Australia
  - ABC
- United States
  - PBS
  - USA Network (as part of programming block Calliope)
- United Kingdom
  - BBC1
- Spain
  - La 1
  - Minimax
  - Televisión de Galicia
  - Telemadrid
  - TV3
  - Navarra Television
- Switzerland
  - RTS 1
  - RSI La 1
  - SRF 1
- Austria
  - ORF 1
- Belgium
  - RTBF1

== DVD releases ==
In Italy, the entire 52-episode main show was released in a 13-volume DVD series.

In Germany, ARD Home Video released Volume 1, Volume 2, Volume 3, and Volume 4 on October 7, 2003.
