= Carbone (restaurant) =

Italian-American restaurant in New York City

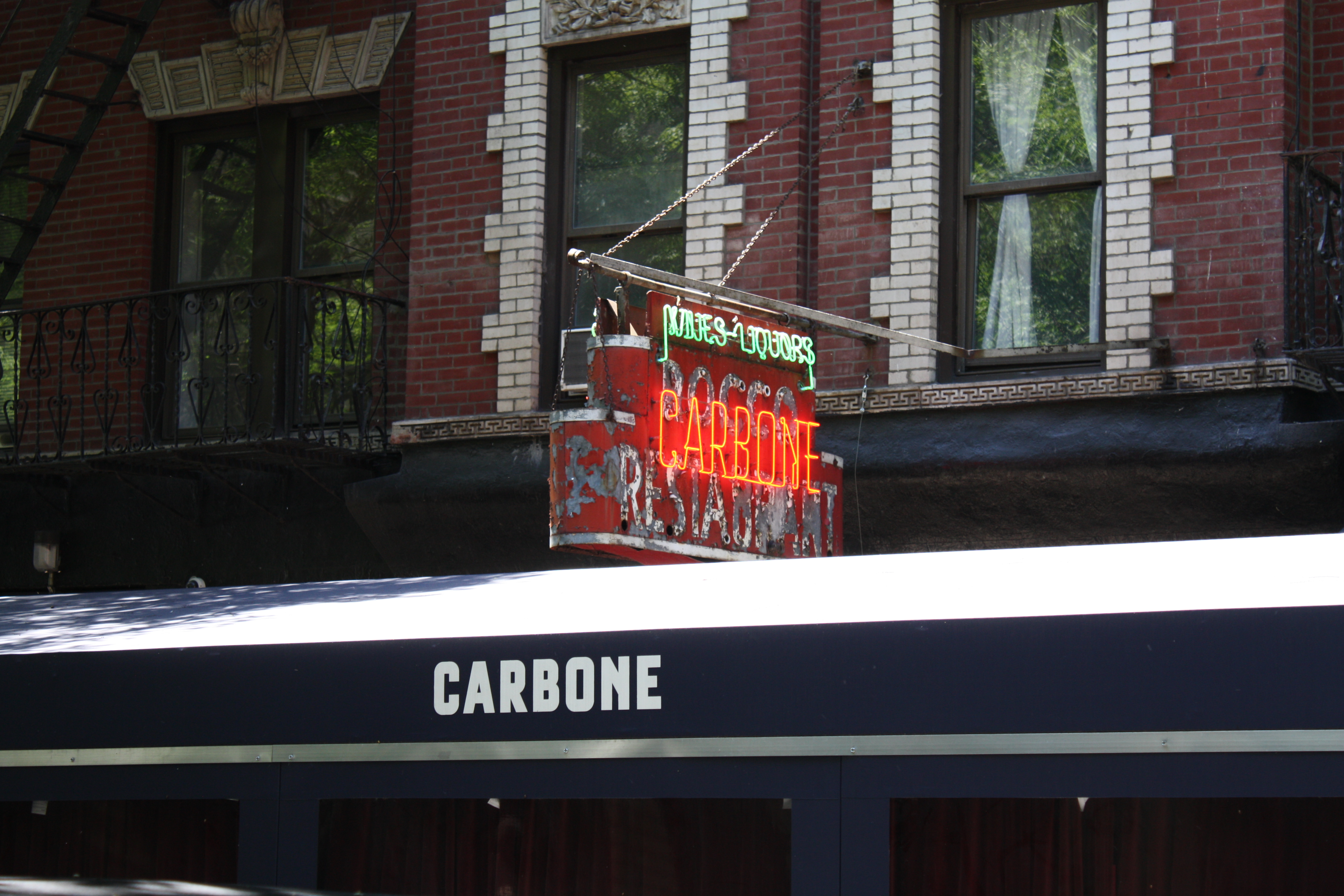
- Carbone's distinctive neon sign
- Interactive map of Carbone

Restaurant information
- Established: 2012
- Owner: Major Food Group
- Food type: Italian-American
- Location: 181 Thompson Street, New York City, New York, 10012
- Coordinates: 40.72800°N 74.00020°W
- Website: carbonenewyork.com

Carbone is an Italian-American restaurant chain with locations in the Greenwich Village neighborhood of Manhattan and elsewhere. It is operated by Major Food Group, which also operated ZZ's Clam Bar. The original restaurant opened in 2013, and replaced another Italian establishment, the 90-year-old Rocco Restaurant. Founders Mario Carbone and Rich Torrisi say that they modeled the menu, decor, and atmosphere on mid-century Italian restaurants popular in New York City.

== History ==
The restaurant's founders had previously opened a deli, Torrisi Italian Specialties, and a sandwich shop, Parm. Before opening Carbone, the founders conducted research by visiting Italian restaurants throughout New York City.

The restaurant's New York City location began offering take-out during the COVID-19 pandemic, which led to crowding outside the restaurant as delivery workers and customers waited to pick up orders. By April 2021 the restaurant had stopped offering food for pick-up or delivery. The New York location added a weatherproofed structure for outdoor eating in late 2020, featuring the same floor tile and tin ceiling as the restaurant's interior.

Carbone's Fine Food and Wine, a restaurant in Dallas, sued Major Food Group for infringing on its trademark after the opening of a Carbone in Dallas. It was alleged that sauces sold by Major Food Group brands were displayed in a market using trademarks belonging to the Barsotti family. Carbone's later dropped the suit without revealing details of the settlement.

In June 2024, Carbone was one of several New York City restaurants where patrons were robbed at gunpoint.

== Locations ==
Country/region	Locations	References
Hong Kong	1 (Central)	
Qatar	1 (Doha)	
Saudi Arabia	1 (Riyadh)	
United Arab Emirates	1 (Dubai)	
United Kingdom	1 (London)	
United States	4 (1 Dallas, 2 Las Vegas, 1 Miami, 1 New York)	
Total	9	

In 2015, a second Carbone opened in Las Vegas, located within the Aria Resort and Casino. A Miami location opened in January 2021. Carbone also has a location in Hong Kong. A location in Riyadh, Saudi Arabia was opened in November 2023. Carbone Riviera at the Bellagio hotel in Las Vegas opened in Fall 2025.

== Reputation and ratings ==
The New York Times food and restaurant critic Pete Wells first reviewed Carbone in 2013, giving it three out of four possible stars. The restaurant first received a Michelin star in 2013, when it was added to the 2014 edition of the Michelin Guide to New York City. However, it lost it in 2022.

Carbone is known for its celebrity clientele. The Instagram account DeuxMoi frequently features information about celebrities dining at the restaurant.
