= Rocco Restaurant =

- Interactive map of Rocco Restaurant

Restaurant information
- Established: 1922; 104 years ago
- Closed: 2012; 14 years ago
- Previous owners: Rocco Stanziano, Antonio DaSilva, Gianni Respinto
- Location: 181 Thompson Street, New York City, Manhattan, New York, 10012, USA
- Coordinates: 40°43′40.8″N 74°0′0.8″W

Rocco Restaurant was an Italian restaurant on Thompson Street in Greenwich Village.

Ralph Redillo, the superintendent of the building, has said it was a “big mob joint” and in the 1950s, attracted Marilyn Monroe and Joe DiMaggio. Later celebrity guests included Johnny Depp, Robert De Niro and Screw Magazine editor Al Goldstein.

Mario Batali worked there as a chef.

It is said that in 1952, Anthony "Tony Bender" Strollo ordered a hit there. In September 1952, he met with Joseph Valachi for dinner. He was given a hit on Eugenio Giannini, a Bureau of Narcotics informer from the Lucchese crime family.

== History ==
Rocco Stanziano opened the restaurant in 1922.

According to owner Antonio DaSilva, (Rocco Stanziano's great-nephew) Rocco's closed in 2012 because of “greedy landlords.” The lease was up at the end of the year and the landlord wanted to raise the monthly rent from $8,000 a month to $18,000 a month. Mario Carbone and Rich Torris took over the lease and opened the original location of Carbone.

Stanziano ran the restaurant until 1966 until his nephew Gianni Respinto took over. Respinto's nephew DaSilva took over in 1992.
