= Major Food Group =

American restaurant and hospitality company

Major Food Group (MFG) is a restaurant and hospitality company associated with fine dining. The company was founded by Mario Carbone, Rich Torrisi, and later developed by partner Jeff Zalaznick. The company grew beyond New York City to international locations, partnering with both brands and hotels.

== History ==
Major Food Group was established in New York City in 2009 with the opening of Torrisi Italian Specialties in Little Italy. The restaurant aimed to modernize Italian-American cuisine while preserving its traditional influences. Jeff Zalaznick joined Carbone and Torrisi as Major Food Group expanded with the introduction of several new restaurants. In 2013, the group opened Carbone, an upscale Italian-American restaurant, along with its sister restaurant and more casual eatery, named Parm. ZZ's Clam Bar, a cocktail and seafood bar, was also launched during this period. The company now has more than 50 restaurants across the globe. High-end dining experiences and elaborate restaurant designs have characterized their brand identity.

== Restaurants ==
=== Carbone ===
Carbone is a mid-20th-century Italian American restaurant. The menu features dishes such as spicy rigatoni with vodka sauce, veal Parmesan, and Caesar salad prepared table side. The restaurant's interior design incorporates both vintage elements as well as classic Italian American dining decor. They first received a Michelin star in 2013, as they were added to the 2014 Michelin Guide, however, they lost their star in 2022. Originally launched in New York City, Carbone has locations in Miami, Dallas, Riyadh, Las Vegas, Hong Kong, and Dubai.

=== Parm ===
Parm is an Italian American casual dining restaurant that specializes in comfort food, including sandwiches and pasta. The restaurant has multiple locations throughout New York, as well as restaurants in Las Vegas and Boston.

=== ZZ's Clam Bar and ZZ's Club ===
ZZ's Clam Bar was a small seafood and cocktail bar that featured a menu featuring caviar, crudo, and shellfish. The group opened the restaurant down the street from Carbone in 2013. They gained a Michelin star in 2014 and retained it until 2022. In 2021, they used the "ZZ" namesake to open a members-only club called ZZ's Club in Miami. In 2023, they opened a 25,000 square foot ZZ's club location in Hudson Yards in New York City. Within ZZ's club, there are two restaurants; ZZ's, which serves Japanese fare, and Carbone Privato, a private Carbone location only open to the members of the club. The membership fees begin at a $20,000 initiation fee along with yearly dues. In late 2023, the restaurant closed to use the space as extended private dining for Carbone.

=== Sadelle's ===
Sadelle's is a bakery and restaurant that sells bagels, smoked fish platters, and a brunch-focused menu. Sadelle's has additional locations outside of NYC, including Miami, and Las Vegas.

== Awards and recognition ==
Major Food Group's restaurants have received Michelin stars for Carbone ZZ's Clam Bar and Torrisi. Torrisi is the only restaurant that still has a Michelin Star.
