= Teneramente Licia =

- Country of origin: Italy

Teneramente Licia is an Italian television series. It is one of the four live adaptations of the Japanese manga Ai Shite Knight. It is the sequel to Love me Licia and Licia dolce Licia, and was followed by Balliamo e cantiamo con Licia.

== See also ==
- List of Italian television series
