= Torrisi (restaurant) =

Italian restaurant in New York City

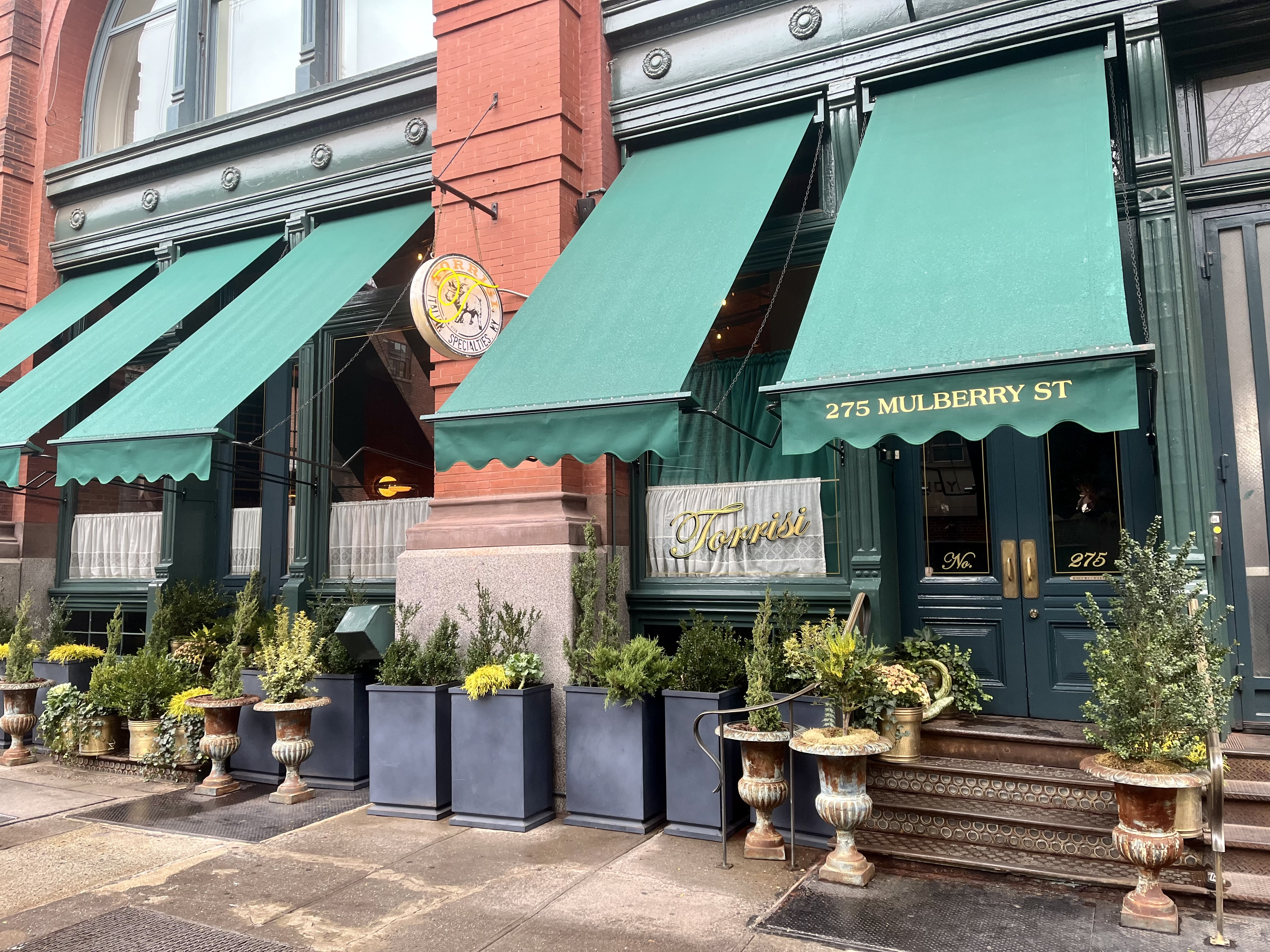
- Torrisi in December 2023
- Interactive map of Torrisi

Restaurant information
- Owners: Major Food Group (Jeff Zalaznick, Mario, Carbone, and Rich Torrisi)
- Head chef: Charlie England
- Pastry chef: Nicholas Bocklage
- Food type: Italian
- Rating: Michelin Guide:
- Location: 275 Mulberry Street, New York City, New York, 10012, United States
- Coordinates: 40°43′27.5″N 73°59′43.5″W
- Reservations: Required (outside of walk-ins at the bar)
- Website: torrisinyc.com

Torrisi is an Italian restaurant located in the Puck Building in New York City in the neighborhood of Nolita opened by Major Food Group nearby their old first restaurant Torrisi Italian Specialties. Established in December 2022, the business was included in The New York Times's 2023 list of the 50 best restaurants in the United States. The restaurant was ranked 10th on The New York Times list of the best NYC restaurants in 2024, going up 23 places from the prior year and received a Michelin Star in 2023.

== See also ==
- List of Italian restaurants
- List of Michelin-starred restaurants in New York City
