= Licia Fertz =

Italian influencer and activist (born 1930)

- Born: 1 March 1930 (age 96); Trieste, Italy
- Occupations: Nurse; influencer; activist

Licia Fertz (born 1 March 1930), also known as Nonna Licia, is an Italian social media influencer and former nurse. She currently resides in the city of Viterbo.

== Biography ==
Fertz was born and raised in Trieste, Italy, on 1 March 1930.

After her husband's death, her grandson Elo secretly created an Instagram account for her. She quickly became famous for her outspoken advocacy, bright colors, and positive spirit. She posed nude for the magazine Rolling Stone Italia in 2019 when she was 89 years old, picked hemp to support cannabis legalization, and posed as the Pope. She has been known as a bold advocate against ageism and for LGBTQ+ rights, and has advocated against body shaming. In 2020, she published her book, Non C'è Tempo per Essere Tristi (English: There Is No Time To Be Sad). She was featured in a special edition of Donna Moderna called #OneGenerationWoman in 2021. Her second book, C’è sempre tempo per rincominciare, which she co-wrote with her grandson, was released in 2026.

In 2023, she was selected as one of the BBC's 100 Women of that year in honor of her fight against ageism and her feminist and pro-LGBTQ+ advocacy, as well as her fight for body positivity. That same year, she broke her femur for the third time. She was worried that she would lose her independence, but after her leg healed she began walking again.

In April 2026, she was noted as one of the leading inspirations of the social media trend of "Nonnamaxxing", where people attempt to follow many of the aspects of the lifestyle of an Italian nonna, including walking more, taking time with friends, and eating homemade food.

She is known as "Italy's oldest influencer".
