= Balliamo e cantiamo con Licia =

- Country of origin: Italy
- Original language: Italian

Original release
- Network: Italia 1
- Release: 1988

Balliamo e cantiamo con Licia (Let's Dance and Sing with Licia) is an Italian television series. It is the fourth live adaptations of the Japanese manga Ai Shite Knight. It is the sequel to Love me Licia, Licia dolce Licia, and Teneramente Licia.

== See also ==
- List of Italian television series
