= Love Me, My Knight =

Japanese manga series

- Love You, My Knight
- Cover art from the manga Love You, My Knight

愛してナイト (Aishite Naito)
- Manga
- Written by: Kaoru Tada
- Published by: Shueisha
- English publisher: M'z Planning (digital)
- Magazine: Bessatsu Margaret
- Original run: 1982 – 1984
- Volumes: 7
- Anime television series

Love In Rock 'N' Roll
- Directed by: Osamu Kasai
- Produced by: Toshio Katsuta; Hiroshi Takeda; Kato Morihiro (TV Asahi); Yasuhiro Tomita (Toei Advertising)
- Music by: Nozomi Aoki
- Studio: Toei Animation
- Original network: ANN (TV Asahi)
- Original run: March 1, 1983 – January 24, 1984
- Episodes: 42

Love Me, My Knight (愛してナイト, Aishite Naito), also known as Love In Rock 'N' Roll, is a shōjo manga created in the early 1980s by Kaoru Tada. An anime adaptation was released in 1983 until 1984, running for 42 episodes by Toei Animation. A live action adaptation titled Love me Licia was also produced in Italy in 1986 (followed by three more series). The manga is licensed in English by M'z Planning for digital release on the Kindle and comixology.

== Plot summary ==
"Love Me, My Knight" is set in Osaka and tells the story of Yaeko "Yakko" Mitamura, an 18-year-old girl working in her father's Okonomiyaki restaurant. One day Yakko meets a little boy named Hashizo and his odd cat Juliano. Hashizo had lost both parents when still a baby and has been brought up by his elder brother Go. Go Kato is the lead singer of the emerging rock band "Bee Hive." When Yakko meets Go and his friend and "Bee Hive" member Satomi Okawa, an unexpected series of events and a tangled romance unfold.

The main narrative of "Love You, My Knight" is essentially a love story, but has interesting and innovative elements introduced to it by Kaoru Tada, most notably the portrayal of the Japanese music scene in the early '80s. In creating characters such as Go, Satomi and their band "Bee Hive", Tada was inspired by well-known bands of the time such as "The Stalin", "Novela", "Primadonna" and "44Magnum." Tada also plays with sexual provocation and sexual ambiguity, mainly embodied by the character of "Kiss Relish" vocalist Kazuma Kataoka/Sheila, although these elements were considerably toned down in the anime version of the story.

== Characters ==
- Yaeko (Yakko) Mitamura (三田村 八重子, Mitamura Yaeko) Voiced by: Mitsuko Horie

Yaeko (Yakko) (born September 15) is 18 years old at the beginning of the story. Yakko works at her father's okonomiyaki restaurant "Mambo" in Osaka as well as attending evening classes at the university. Yakko is a romantic and a little naive, and she is flattered by the attention paid to her by one of the regular customers of her father's restaurant, handsome and long-haired Satomi Okawa. One day she casually meets two people that will change her life: Go Kato and his little brother Hashizo. Yakko soon discovers that Go and Satomi are friends and both members of an emerging rock band, "Bee Hive". She is attracted to them both but soon realizes she will have to make a choice between them. She becomes Go's girlfriend, although his career as a musician causes more than one problem for their relationship.

- Gou Kato (加藤 剛, Katō Gō) Voiced by: Isao Sasaki

Go is the lead singer of "Bee Hive" and a student at the university. He lives with his little brother Hashizo in a small apartment and is trying to become a professional and successful musician. He is cocky but charming and has a reputation of being a playboy. However, when he falls in love with Yakko, he becomes totally devoted to her, although he has to struggle with juggling his musical career and romantic relationship.
Even though Isao Sasaki is a singer, Go's songs are actually sung by Ai Takano in the anime.

- Hashizo Kato (加藤 橋蔵, Katō Hashizō) Voiced by: Yūko Mita

Hashizo's real name is Hideki, but he was given the name "Hashizo" by his brother Go when he went to live with him after the death of his parents. Hashizo is Go's half-brother, being the son of Go's father and his mistress. After their death in car crash, Go decided to look after his baby brother although still very young himself, and they have been living together ever since. Hashizo is a very responsible little boy and, because of Go's career as a musician, he spends a lot of time alone with his best friend, the cat Juliano. When he meets Yakko, he becomes very attached to her, and the "Mambo" becomes his second home.

- Juliano (ジュリアーノ) Voiced by: Masashi Amenomori, Shingo Kanemoto

Juliano is Hashizo's pet cat and also his best friend. Juliano is very intelligent and faithful, although grumpy and diffident of strangers. He provides comic relief throughout the story, despite after being adopted, he began to hate the women with a misogyny crisis.

- Satomi Okawa (大川 里美, Ōkawa Satomi) Voiced by: Katsuji Mori

Satomi is Go's best friend and the keyboard player for "Bee Hive"; he comes from a wealthy family and is an incredibly talented musician. Opposite to Go, he is calm and more introverted. He is also a university student and gives private keyboard lessons in his spare time. He falls in love with Yakko even before Go does, and when he finds out that Go is also after Yakko, he leaves the band for some time. He finally realizes that Yakko has chosen Go, and returns to the band. He helps Yakko and Go through difficult times as a good and faithful friend.

- Shigemaro Mitamura (三田村 しげまろ, Mitamura Shigemaro) Voiced by: Takeshi Aono

Shigemaro is Yakko's father and owner of the okonomiyaki restaurant "Mambo". A widower since Yakko was very young, he has raised her practically on his own. He is very attached to his only daughter and, being somewhat narrow-minded and conservative, opposes her involvement with a rock musician such as Go. Shige-san is very fond of Hashizo and Juliano, and eventually he accepts Go as well. He is a great fan of enka.

- Isuzu Fujita (藤田 五十鈴, Fujita Isuzu) Voiced by: Satomi Majima

Isuzu is Yakko's best friend and fellow student. She is a beautiful and outgoing girl, and a big fan of "Bee Hive" since their beginnings. She has a crush on Go and tries to seduce him, although he turns her down for Yakko. After getting over losing Go to her friend, she falls for "Bee Hive" guitarist Eiji Tono and eventually marries him.

- Meiko Kajiwara (梶原 芽衣子, Kajiwara Meiko) Voiced by: Chiyoko Kawashima

Meiko is Satomi's admirer and fan. To be closer to him, she pays him to give her private keyboard lessons, although he is oblivious to the fact that she is really in love with him. Meiko also joins an amateur rock band and finally finds a musician boyfriend, although her feelings for Satomi have not entirely disappeared.

- Kazuma Kataoka (Sheila) Voiced by: Hideyuki Tanaka

Sheila is the leader of Kiss Relish, a popular rock band, and Bee Hive's most dangerous competitor. Sheila plays with innuendo, camp and sexual ambiguity; he apparently has a crush on Go and always tries to embarrass him by hugging and kissing him in public. In reality, Sheila is married to the "Kiss Relish" manager Marino. A very talented singer, Sheila becomes Go and Yakko's good friend and advises Go on his musical career. Sheila's songs are sung by the artist GAKURO.

- Ryotaro Kitaoji

Ryotaro is the leader of the punk band Insuubunkai, he becomes Shige-san's assistant at "Mambo" by a strategem. He makes Shige-san believe that he is an orphan looking for a job and lodgings; in reality, Ryotaro has run away from home to play with his punk band and is only 17 years old. He is the cause of much trouble between Yakko and Go, relentlessly pursuing Yakko and challenging Go.

- Eiji Tono (東野 英次, Tōno Eiji) Voiced by: Kaneto Shiozawa

Eiji is Bee Hive's guitar player. He marries Yakko's friend Isuzu Fujita.

- Hiroyuki Sugi Voiced by:Hideyuki Hori

Hiroyuki is Bee Hive's bass player. He briefly leaves the band to return to Kyoto, his hometown, and take over his parents' business with his fiancee' Izumi, but he comes back, encouraged by Izumi, when his friends need him the most.

- Shin'ichi Matsudaira

Shin'ichi is the Bee Hive's drummer.

- Marino Kataoka

Marino is the manager of Kiss Relish and wife of Sheila. During the series the couple has a baby daughter, Hatoko.

- Kaoru Chiba and Gonta Sanada

Kaoru and Gonta both attend playschool with Hashizo. Kaoru has a crush on Hashizo, whereas Gonta is trying to attract the little girl's attention to himself. When Hashizo helps Gonta in a difficult situation, he decides to repay him by ensuring his and Kaoru's happiness at all costs.

- Yoko Kato

Yoko is Go's mother. The two of them are not very close, as Yoko still hasn't quite overcome her hard feelings towards Hashizo, the son that her husband had with his mistress. Capricious and temperamental, Yoko does not approve of Go's choice of girlfriend and gives Yakko a hard time.

- Yamadazaka

Yamadazaka is the manager of "Bee Hive". His main interest is making the band successful and making Go into a rock star. He does not hesitate to interfere into the members' private lives to achieve his goal.

- Mr. Tsune Voiced by: Masashi Amenomori, Shingo Kanemoto

Mr. Tsune is a middle-aged man who frequents the Mambo. He is later seen to be a painter and repairer of Shōji (Japanese screen doors).

== Media ==
=== Manga ===
The manga is available in English through BookWalker and Kindle.

=== Anime ===
The anime version of "Love You, My Knight", also called Love In Rock N' Roll was produced by Toei Animation in 1983, for a total of 42 episodes directed by Osamu Kasai. The "Love You, My Knight" anime presents some significant changes in the storyline and modifications in the characters' stories, and covers only one part of the story narrated by Tada in the manga. It was developed to target a younger audience than that of the manga with some aspects toned down and simplified.

Famous voice actress and pop idol Mitsuko Horie provided the voice of Yakko in the anime. Isao Sasaki was the voice of Go, Katsuji Mori of Satomi, Takeshi Aono of Shige-San, and Yūko Mita of Hashizo. Masa Amamori provided the voice of Juliano. Mitsuko Horie also sang "Koi wa Totsuzen" ("Love is sudden"), the song featured in the opening credits of each episode.

==== Episode list ====
1. "The Boy, the Cat, and the Cool Guy" (March 1, 1983)

2. "Juliano the Misogynist" (March 8, 1983)

3. "Too early for a kiss" (March 15, 1983)

4. "The Destined Rock-n-Roll" (March 22, 1983)

5. "Go and Yakko's Wedding Figurine" (March 29, 1983)

6. "Midnight Platonic Love" (April 5, 1983)

7. "The Maiden Falls in a Love Triangle" (April 12, 1983)

8. "Forgotten Love Song" (April 19, 1983)

9. "The Illusion of a Kiss" (April 26, 1983)

10. "The Birthday Present of Love" (May 3, 1983)

11. "Farewell, Go" (May 10, 1983)

12. "The Jigsaw Puzzle of Love" (May 17, 1983)

13. "The Freeway of Sadness" (May 24, 1983)

14. "A Nocturne of Love and Loss" (May 31, 1983)

15. "Hashizo's Been Kidnapped" (June 7, 1983)

16. "Long Live Rock and Roll" (June 14, 1983)

17. "Juliano's A Jolly Good Fellow" (June 21, 1983)

18. "Yakko's Rainbow-Colored Scat" (June 28, 1983)

19. "Hashizo's Birthday" (July 5, 1983)

20. "Lonely Little Boy in the Dark of Night" (July 12, 1983)

21. "Go! Go! Bee Hive" (July 19, 1983)

22. "The Long Beach at Dawn" (July 26, 1983)

23. "A Steamy Kiss Amongst the White Birches" (August 2, 1983)

24. "A Duet in the Heart of the Storm" (August 9, 1983)

25. "Summer Festival Samba" (August 16, 1983)

26. "Hot Vocals on the Lakeshore" (August 23, 1983)

27. "A Passionate Exchange" (August 30, 1983)

28. "Yakko's First Kiss" (September 6, 1983)

29. "Baby, I Love You" (September 13, 1983)

30. "A Love Song Beneath the Starry Sky" (September 20, 1983)

31. "The Return of the Wedding Dolls" (September 27, 1983)

32. "A Wedding of Love and Sadness" (October 11, 1983)

33. "My Lonely Heart" (November 1, 1983)

34. "A Prelude to Parting" (November 8, 1983)

35. "The Broken Rhythm Machine" (November 22, 1983)

36. "The Flame of Love: Fire!" (November 29, 1983)

37. "Lullaby of Paris" (December 6, 1983)

38. "Melody For A Little Star" (December 13, 1983)

39. "Rock 'n Roll Cupid" (December 20, 1983)

40. "A Snow-Colored Ballad" (January 10, 1984)

41. "The Lovers' Concerto" (January 17, 1984)

42. "Wedding Bells for Go" (January 24, 1984)

==== Music ====
The main reason why the anime version of "Love You, My Knight" is particularly famous is because it features, for the first time ever, original songs within the episodes, a plot device which will be very successful in subsequent anime series such as Mahou no Tenshi Creamy Mami and – more recently – Nana. The songs were performed by "Bee Hive" and the rival band "Kiss Relish" and they popular enough to be released in a companion album. Joe Hisaishi, who has composed the music for Hayao Miyazaki's movies, collaborated with composer Nozomu Aoki in writing and arranging the songs. The original songs featured in the anime are:

Performed by "Bee Hive"

- Rockin' all night
- Fire
- Midnight Rock'n'Roll Star
- Lonely Boy
- Baby, I Love You
- Freeway
- Someday on Sunday
- Love Again

Performed by "Kiss Relish"

- Let Me Feel
- Boxer

A collection of all the original songs are featured in an album called Debut-Bee Hive, which was produced in Japan immediately after the end of the anime series. Subsequently, a tribute album titled Aishite Knight - Hit Kyoku Shu "Yakko, I Love You" was also released, and it included the opening and closing songs of the series, as well as tribute songs for the various characters arranged on some of the background music used throughout the anime.

== Internationalization ==
The anime also became extremely popular in Europe with the title "Rock n' Roll Kids" in Germany, "Embrasse-moi, Lucile" and "Lucile, Amour et Rock n' Roll" in France, and "Kiss me Licia" in Italy, as well as "Bésame Licia" in Spanish. The anime series was so popular in Italy that it spawned a successful domestically produced Italian live-action teen soap opera, which ran for 145 episodes through four series ("Love me Licia," "Licia dolce Licia," "Teneramente Licia," and "Balliamo e cantiamo con Licia") on Italian TV from 1986 to 1988. Cristina D'Avena, who performed the Italian theme song to the anime series, played Licia (Yakko) in the live-action version.

Versions of the songs in several languages also exist because of the popularity of "Love You, My Knight" outside Japan. In Italy, Switzerland, Malta and Slovenia, "Bee Hive" became teenagers' idols, especially when the live action sequels to "Love You, My Knight" were aired and featured new songs performed by the band, which were awarded even gold and platinum status. The "Bee Hive" members in the live action series were:

- vocals Go/Mirko: Pasquale Finicelli (voiced by Enzo Draghi)
- keyboards Satomi: Sebastian Harrison
- drums Matsudaira/Matt: Manuel De Peppe
- bass Sugi/Steve: Marco Bellavia
- guitar Tono/Tony: Giovanni Colombo

Manuel De Peppe, Marco Bellavia and Giovanni Colombo left for the third season, so three new characters were introduced:

- drums Mike: Vincenzo Rinaldi
- bass Jim: Germano Di Mattia
- guitar Paul: Luciano De Marini

Marco Bellavia returned for the fourth and final season.

Musical adaptation

In 2015, a theatrical adaptation titled Kiss Me Licia – Il Musical was created in Italy, licensed directly from Japan, written and directed by Thomas Centaro. In 2025, to celebrate the 40th anniversary of the Italian airing of the series, Centaro presented a new celebratory edition of the musical in Milan. This updated version featured refreshed staging and production, while maintaining the spirit and pop style of the '80s, with the participation of Pietro Ubaldi, the Italian voice actor for Juliano and Mitamura.
