= Manuel De Peppe =

Italian actor and musician

Manuel De Peppe is an Italian actor, pianist, keyboardist, drummer, composer, arranger, and producer. He spent the majority of his career as an actor and singer, but in 2005 moved to the United States primarily as a composer, music producer and arranger.

== Early life ==
Manuel De Peppe was born in Milan, Italy in 1970. He spent most of his early years studying acting, music, dubbing, vocal, piano, and drums at the CTA (Centro Teatro Attivo) in Milan, and at age 14 he passed the SIAE composers examination. Around the same time, he began to work in advertising, acting in commercials and as a model for two years.

== Actor ==
In 1986, De Peppe played the character of "Matt" (the drummer of the band Beehive) in an Italian TV series called Love Me Licia, his first major role in broadcast television. He followed this up from 1987 to 1993 with a series of soap operas and television films, such as Licia Dolce Licia (Licia sweet Licia) and Don Tonino. In the Don Tonino series, De Peppe demonstrated his skills in both comedy scenes and dramatic scenes. He received positive reviews.

== Music ==
In 1993 De Peppe started to compose, arrange, and producing music for different TV Networks. He collaborated with others including Peer Music, Bill Champlin, Tamara Champlin, Piero Cassano, Andrea Lo Vecchio, Ivana Spagna, Toto Cutugno, Marco Grasso, Pablo Manavello, Jorge Luis Cachin, Martha Cancel, Bernadette O'Reilly, Anthony Fedorov, Clara Serina, Franco Fasano, Danilo Amerio and Ariztia. In 2008 he reunited the band Bee Hive under the new name of Bee Hive Reunion and composed and produced a new single "Don't Say Goodbye". In 2011 Bee Hive Reunion toured Italy. De Peppe released singles as a solo singer. During His career, Manuel created, composed and arranged a lot of famous Commercial Jingles for European TV Channels like: Tamagotchy, Polaretti, Push Pop, Tanya Walking, Ralph, Pasqualone, Zaini Stranamore, Cicciobelli Amicicci, Giocheria. BeBe Lou, and many more. Since 2022 is working as a composer/arranger on the soundtrack for a new cartoon series Amicicci inspired to the popular European toys "Amicicci produced from the iconic toy's company Giochi Preziosi. Manuel sings also the opening theme and the internal songs of each episode.

== Hosting ==
- 1995 Hosted "Quelli Di Domani" at Teatro Nazionale of Milan, Italy.
- 2010 Hosted "Miss Italia USA California 2010" in Sausalito, California, USA.

== Recognition ==
- In 1990, De Peppe was invited to the Campidoglio in Rome where he was awarded the "Oscar dei giovani" award as artist of the year.
- In 1997, De Peppe was awarded the "TOKYMEKY 97" prize of the Japanese Anime Festival in Milan for his musical and production contributions.

== Discography ==
- 1986 - Love me Licia e i Bee Hive (drummer)
- 1987 - Licia dolce Licia e i Bee Hive (drummer)
- 1988 - Tutti in campo con Lotti/Tu con noi (singer)
- 1989 - Per te Armenia - Italian Singers together for Armenia (singer)
- 1990 - Il mondo siamo noi/Una donna da poco (singer)
- 1991 - Il meglio di Licia e i Bee Hive (drummer)
- 1993 - Le canzoni di Licia (drummer)
- 1999 - Paola (in duet with Enzo Draghi) (singer, arranger, producer, composer, pianist, keyboardist, drummer, programmer)
- 2000 - Que calor - Luz Latina (featuring singer as Manuel D.)
- 2002 - Ballet (singer, arranger, producer, composer, pianist, keyboardist, drummer, synth bassist, choir, programmer)
- 2008 - Don't Say Goodbye With Bee Hive Reunion (singer, drummer, pianist, keyboardist, background vocalist, producer, composer, arranger, programming)
- 2010 - Licia Bee Hive story (5 CD collection) (drummer)
- 2011 - Primo sogno d'amore - (composer, arranger, producer, pianist, keyboardist, drummer studio engineer)
- 2011 - Anime così - (singer, composer, arranger, producer, pianist, keyboardist, drummer, programmer, studio engineer)
- 2011 - Almas asì - (singer, composer, arranger, producer, pianist, keyboardist, drummer, programmer, studio engineer)
- 2013 - Mi ami anche tu - duet with Clara Serina of the Italian quartet Cavalieri del Re (guest singer)
- 2013 - Me amas también - duet with Clara Serina of the Italian quartet Cavalieri del Re (guest singer)
- 2013 - You - (singer, composer, lyricist, arranger, producer, pianist, keyboardist, drummer, programmer, sound engineer)
- 2013 - Don't say goodbye - (Remix Version) with Bee Hive Reunion (composer, arranger, producer, background vocalist, keyboardist, programming, studio engineer)
- 2013 - This is Christmas time - (singer, composer, lyricist, arranger, producer, pianist, keyboardist, drummer, programmer, studio engineer)
- 2014 - Dove si va - (singer, composer, arranger, producer, piano, keyboardist, drummer, programmer, studio engineer)
- 2014 - Donde vamos - (singer, composer, arranger, producer, piano, keyboardist, drummer, programmer, studio engineer)
- 2014 - Cuore a meta' - (singer, composer, arranger, producer, keyboardist, drummer, beat boxer, background vocalist, programmer, studio engineer)
- 2016 - Subways rock - (composer, arranger, producer, keyboardist, bassist, pianist, drummer, programmer, studio engineer)
- 2017 - Sunrise's dream - (composer, arranger, producer, pianist, keyboardist, drummer, programmer, studio engineer)
- 2017 - You - Live version (singer, arranger, composer, lyricist, producer)
- 2017 - This is Christmas time - Re-Mastered (singer, composer, lyricist, arranger, producer, pianist, keyboardist, drummer, programmer, Studio engineer)
- 2017 - What child is this? - (singer, arranger, producer, keyboardist, drummer, background vocalist, programmer, studio engineer)
- 2018 - Oltre la neve - (composer, arranger, producer, keyboardist, bassist, pianist, drummer, programmer, studio engineer)
- 2018 - A pesar de la nieve - (composer, arranger, producer, keyboardist, bassist, pianist, drummer, programmer, studio engineer)
- 2011 - Almas asì - (Remastered) - (singer, composer, arranger, producer, pianist, keyboardist, drummer, programmer, studio engineer)
- 2019 - Anime così - Live version (singer, arranger, composer, producer)
- 2019 - Credere in voi - (composer, arranger, producer, keyboardist, bassist, pianist, drummer, programmer, studio engineer)
- 2020 - Tutti in campo con Lotti - duet with Stefano Bersola (arranger, keyboardist, bassist, pianist, drummer, programmer, studio engineer)
- 2020 - Don't say goodbye - (Remastered Pop Version) with Bee Hive Reunion (composer, arranger, producer, background vocalist, drummer, keyboardist, programmer, studio engineer)
- 2022 - Amicicci - Animation TV Series' opening theme - (arranger, keyboardist, drummer, programmer, studio engineer, singer for the Italian version).
- 2023 - Anime così - (Remastered) single (singer, composer, arranger, producer, pianist, keyboardist, drummer, programmer, studio engineer)
- 2024 - Musica - with MusicalGalla Band (Feat. singer)
- 2025 - Felling the night - with MusicalGalla Band (Feat. singer)

== Filmography ==
- 1986: Love me Licia - Telefilm (Italian TV Italia 1) - Matt
- 1987: Licia dolce Licia - Telefilm (Italian TV Italia 1) - Matt
- 1988: Don Tonino - Telefilm (Italian TV Italia 1, Canale 5, Happy Channel, Iris, and Canadian TV TLN Tele Latino Network) - Gabriele
- 1989: Don Tonino 2 - Telefilm (Italian TV Canale 5-Italia 1, Happy Channel, Iris, and Canadian TV TLN Tele Latino Network) - Gabriele
- 1993: LA RÖDA LA GIRA - Soap opera (TSI 1- Televisione della Svizzera italiana) - Marco
- 2011: Bee Hive Reunion Tour promo
- 2013: Mi ami anche tu (Music video)
- 2013: Me amas también (Music video)
- 2013: You (Music Video)
- 2013: This is Christmas time (Music video)
- 2022/23: "Amicicci" - Cartoon TV Serie (TV Channel Frisbee) - (composer-arranger-singer-music producer-studio engineer)
- 2024: Musica - with MusicalGalla Band (Feat. singer) (Music video)

== Videography ==
- 2015: Love me Licia - Matt (DVD Box)
- 2017: Licia dolce Licia - Matt (DVD Box)
