= Alessandra Karpoff =

Italian voice actress (born 1963)

- Born: 3 June 1963 (age 63); Milan, Italy
- Occupation: Voice actress

Alessandra Karpoff (born 3 June 1963) is an Italian voice actress, who voices characters in anime, cartoons, movies, and other content. She was born in Milan.

She provides the voice of Misty in the Italian-language version of the anime series Pokémon. Karpoff also voiced Keiko Yukimura in the Italian-language version of the anime series YuYu Hakusho.

She was also the voice of Sailor Mars (1st season), Sailor Neptune and Sailor Jupiter (last season) in the Italian version of Sailor Moon.

She works at Merak Film, Deneb Film, Studio P.V., and other dubbing studios in Milan, Italy.

== Voice work ==
=== Anime and animation ===
- Misty, Lilly Meridian, Cynthia, and Hunter J in Pokémon
- Misty in Pokémon Chronicles, Pokémon: The First Movie, Pokémon: The Movie 2000, Pokémon 3: The Movie, Pokémon 4Ever, Pokémon Heroes
- Sabrina Spellman on Sabrina: The Animated Series
- Nefertari Vivi (Episode 291-present) in One Piece
- Natsumi Hinata in Sgt. Frog
- Rosé in Fullmetal Alchemist
- Lucy van Pelt in It Was My Best Birthday Ever, Charlie Brown
- Miho Shinohara/Fancy Lala in Fancy Lala
- Reina in Angel's Friends
- Princess Peach in The Super Mario Bros. Super Show!
- Emi Isuzu in Tenjho Tenge
- Delphinium in Blue Dragon, Blue Dragon: Trial of the Seven Shadows
- Bobbi "Blade" Summer in Batman Beyond
- Mamu in Oobi
- Jenny Wakeman in My Life as a Teenage Robot
- Tad in LeapFrog
- Shingo Tsukino in Sailor Moon (Viz Media redub)
- Penelope Asparagus in VeggieTales
- Space Boy and Young Gizmo in Rolie Polie Olie
- Joyce Griff in Stanley
- Zoe in Harvey Girls Forever!
- Samantha Jones in Sarah Lee Jones
- Tito Chavez, Rebecca, Chrissy's Mom and Jimmy McCorkle in Maya & Miguel
- Princess Frostine in Candy Land: The Great Lollipop Adventure
- Lois in Bear in the Big Blue House
- Click in Between the Lions
- Vega in My Life as an Adult Android
- Sam in Totally Spies!
- Tracy in Tomodachi Life: The TV Series
- Aelita Schaeffer(2nd voice) in Code Lyoko
- Deborah "Debbie" Thornberry in The Wild Thornberrys
- Grace Jones in Emma - A Victorian Romance
- Pail in Blue's Clues
- Satsuki Arashiyama in Nanaka 6/17
- Keiko Yukimura in YuYu Hakusho
- Biscuit Krueger in Hunter x Hunter
- Sherry Belmont in Zatch Bell!
- Tracy Milbanks in James Bond Jr.
- Yuzuriha Nekoi in X
- Winnie in Alfred J. Kwak
- Lady Bat in Mermaid Melody Pichi Pichi Pitch Pure
- and others

=== Live action ===
- Victoria in How I Met Your Mother
- Jenny in The Muppets Take Manhattan
- Kim in Barney & Friends
- Elaine Vassal in Ally McBeal
- Agnes Carlsson in Survivors
- Beth in Vincent
- Miranda in Blue's Clues
- Ashley Elliot in USA High
- Dr. Gina Jefferson in Sesame Street
- Diane Hughes in Jake 2.0
- Fran in Catastrophe
- Lauren Zelmer in Just for Kicks (TV series)
- Alyson Butler in Call Red
- Klaudia in Frontier(s)
- Audrey Malone in Beggars and Choosers
- Anne-Marie Uhde in Séraphine
- and others
