= Pietro Ubaldi (voice actor) =

Italian voice actor

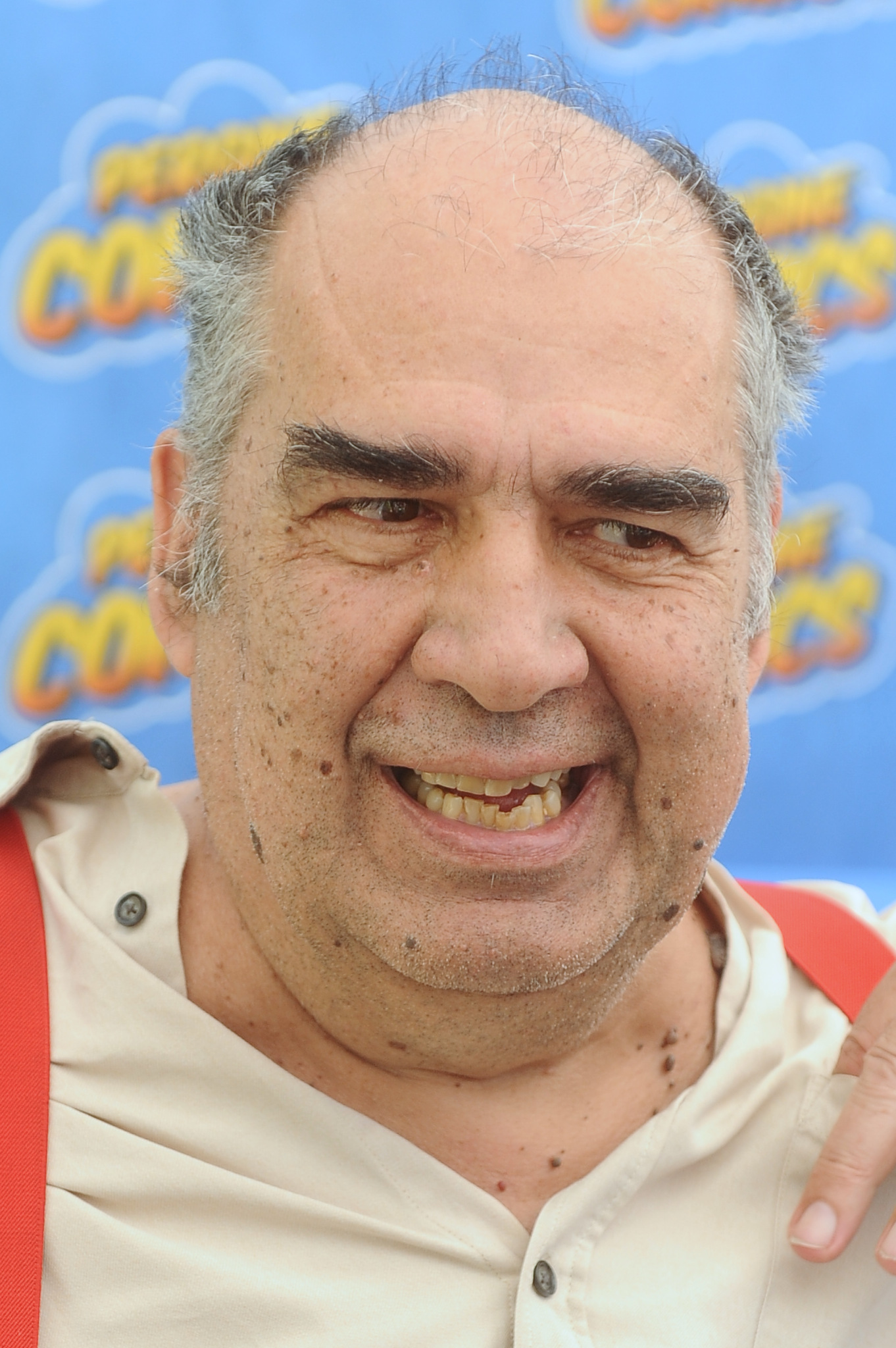
- Pietro Ubaldi at Pergine Comics 2026
- Born: 21 September 1955 (age 71); Milan, Italy
- Occupations: Actor; voice actor; singer; television presenter
- Years active: 1978–present

Pietro Ubaldi (born 21 September 1955) is an Italian voice actor, known for being the voice of Doraemon, Patrick Star in SpongeBob SquarePants, Meowth in Pokémon and Scooby Doo in various animated movies.

== Biography ==
Active primarily in the field of dubbing for cartoons and video games, in the film industry he dubbed Geoffrey Rush, in the role of Hector Barbossa, in the Pirates of the Caribbean films. He also dubbed Jeremy Clarkson in all episodes of the BBC series Top Gear.

He hosted the children's show Game Boat, broadcast on Rete 4 in the early evening slot from 1996 to 1999, for which he also performed the theme song together with the Coro dei Piccoli Cantori di Milano. He was also one of the creators of the program Bim Bum Bam, to which he contributed as an actor and voice actor: in fact, since 1994 he has been the voice of the puppet Uan, replacing Giancarlo Muratori, who died in 1996. Since 2003 he has been the voice of Doraemon in the animated series of the same name and since 2004 of Patrick Stella in SpongeBob SquarePants; finally he voiced some characters in the Dragon Ball series and films and in the Barbie films, as well as Meowth from Team Rocket (Pokémon) as a second voice.

Since 2004, he has been the official announcer for Boing. In 2015, he competed on Italia's Got Talent as the puppet Ucio Bicio. As the voice of the puppet Four, he recorded the theme songs for the program Ciao Ciao from 1986 to 1992, starting with Giorgia Passeri (in 1986 and 1987), Debora Magnaghi (in 1988), Paola Tovaglia (from 1989 to 1991), Flavio Albanese (in 1990 and 1991), Marco Milano and Davide Garbolino (voice of Fourino, in 1990), and finally Guido Cavalleri and Marta Iacopini (in 1991).

In 2023, he joined the cast of Disneiamo, a musical show celebrating the centenary of Disney animation, featuring Stefano Bersola, Giulia Ottonello, and Giorgia Vecchini.
