= Emanuela Pacotto =

Italian actress

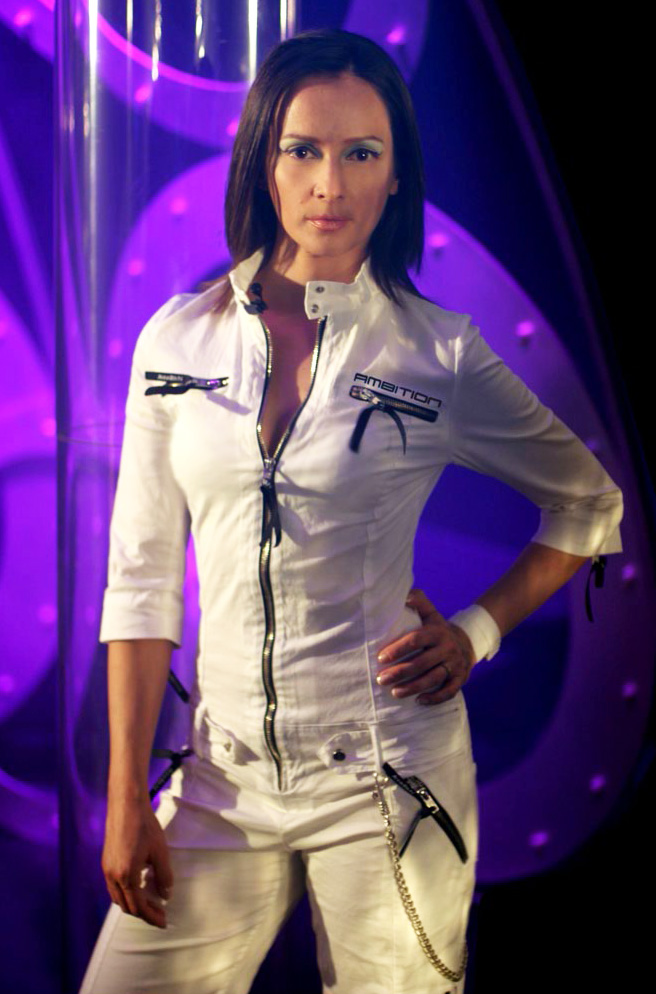
Emanuela Pacotto in 2010

Emanuela Pacotto (born June 7, 1965) is a Milan-based Italian actress who has dubbed over a number of notable roles in anime.

== Voice work ==
- Pocahontas: Princess of the American Indians - Animated series (1997) - Pocahontas
- Angel's Friends - Animated series (2008) - Kabalè
- L'arte con Matì e Dadà - animated series (2014) - Matì

=== Dubbing ===
==== Television animation ====
- Atomic Betty (Betty Barrett/Atomic Betty, 2nd voice - Tajja Isen)
- Alvin and the Chipmunks (Alvin Seville - Ross Bagdasarian Jr.)
- The World of David the Gnome (Anna)
- Cubix (Abby (Choi Duk-hee))
- Dragon Ball (Bulma - Hiromi Tsuru)
- Dragon Tales (Emmy - Andrea Libman)
- Fox's Peter Pan & the Pirates (Michael Darling - Whit Hertford)
- VeggieTales (Madame Blueberry)
- Rolie Polie Olie - Aunt Polie-Anna (Tedde Moore)
- Dr. Slump (Akane Kimidori - Kazuko Sugiyama, Hiroko Konishi)
- Kodomo no Omocha (Mami Suzuki - Azusa Nakao)
- Magical DoReMi - Onpu Segawa (Rumi Shishido)
- Mermaid Melody Pichi Pichi Pitch (Rina Tōin - Mayumi Asano)
- Mew Mew Power (Corina Bucksworth)
- My Little Pony: Friendship Is Magic (Twilight Sparkle)
- Trulli Tales (Miss Frisella)
- Naruto (Sakura Haruno - Chie Nakamura))
- One Piece (Nami - Akemi Okamura)
- Pokémon (Jessie of Team Rocket - Megumi Hayashibara)
- Revolutionary Girl Utena (Utena Tenjō - Tomoko Kawakami)
- Sonic the Hedgehog (Young Sally Acorn)
- Yu-Gi-Oh! 5D's (Misty Tredwell)
- Drawn Together (Princess Clara) - Tara Strong
- Slayers (Lina Inverse)
- Bleach (Orihime Inoue)

==== Theatrical animation ====
- Ah! My Goddess: The Movie (Megumi Morisato (Yuriko Fuchisaki))
- Code Geass: Akito the Exiled (Leila Malkal (Maaya Sakamoto))
- One Piece Movies (Nami (Akemi Okamura))
- My Little Pony: A New Generation (Twilight Sparkle)
- Pokémon: The First Movie (Jessie of Team Rocket (Megumi Hayashibara))
- Pokémon: The Movie 2000 (Jessie of Team Rocket (Megumi Hayashibara))
- Pokémon 3: The Movie (Jessie of Team Rocket (Megumi Hayashibara))
- Pokémon 4Ever (Jessie of Team Rocket (Megumi Hayashibara))
- Pokémon Heroes (Jessie of Team Rocket (Megumi Hayashibara))
- Pokémon: Lucario and the Mystery of Mew (Jessie of Team Rocket (Megumi Hayashibara))
- X (Satsuki Yatoji (Kotono Mitsuishi))

==== Live-action television ====
- Goosebumps (Libby Melissa Bathory) (Attack of the Mutant Parts I & II) (credited as Manuela Pacotto)

==== Video games ====
- Resident Evil: Operation Raccoon City (Claire Redfield (Alyson Court)
- Resident Evil 2 (2019 video game) (Claire Redfield (Stephanie Panisello)
- Sonic Generations (Charmy Bee)
- Sonic Forces (Charmy Bee)
- Tenchu: Wrath of Heaven (Ayame)
- Elsword.it: Ara Haan
- Baldur's gate 2 Shadows of Amn: Imoen
