= Debora Magnaghi =

Italian voice actress

- Born: Milan, Italy
- Occupation: Voice actress

Debora Magnaghi is an Italian voice actress from Milan. She mainly works in the field of animated cartoons.

She made her voice acting debut in the 1980s, dubbing the titular protagonist in the Italian version of the anime Little Memole. She became famous in the early 1990s hosting the Italian TV show Ciao Ciao alongside fellow voice actor Davide Garbolino. Since then, she has dubbed over a number of characters, including Barbara Gordon/Batgirl in Batman: The Animated Series, Ran Mōri in Case Closed, Android 18 in Dragon Ball Z and Dragon Ball GT, Ichigo Momomiya in Tokyo Mew Mew, Ami Mizuno/Sailor Mercury in the entire Sailor Moon series, and most recently Sara in Mermaid Melody Pichi Pichi Pitch. Since 2009, she has played the role Roxy in the animated fantasy series Winx Club and its spin-offs World of Winx and PopPixie. She is also known for dubbing Jill Valentine in Resident Evil series such as in the Resident Evil 3 (2020 video game).
