= Paolo Torrisi =

Italian voice actor (1950–2005)

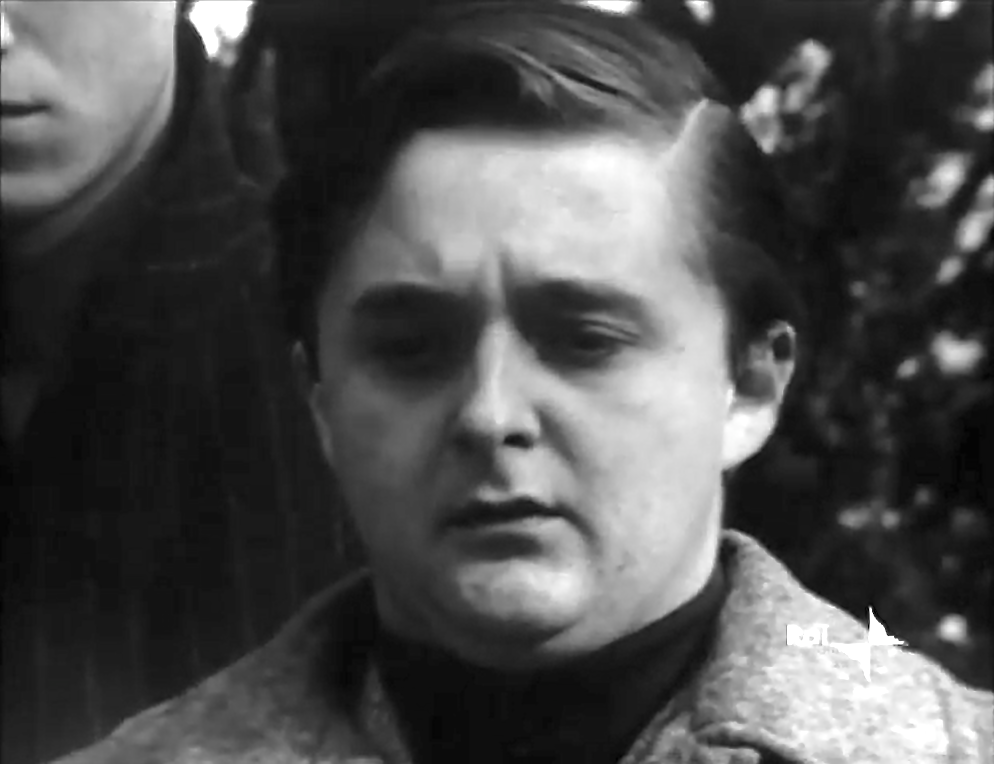
- Born: Maurizio Torresan; 28 March 1950; Milan, Italy
- Died: 7 December 2005 (aged 55); Milan, Italy
- Occupations: Actor; voice actor; dialogue adapter; dubbing director
- Years active: 1961–2005

Paolo Torrisi (born Maurizio Torresan; 28 March 1950 – 7 December 2005) was an Italian actor, voice artist, dubbing director and adapter. In the 1970s he voiced the popular animated character Grisù. He was also known for dubbing adult Goku in Dragon Ball, Dragon Ball Z, Dragon Ball GT and in the second dub of the Dragon Ball films released until his own death. Torrisi worked as a voice dubber, dialogue adapter and dubbing director at Merak Film. He died at the San Raffaele Hospital in Segrate of a liver failure.

== Voice work ==
- Grisù - animated series (1976) - Grisù
- Alberto the Wolf - animated series (1997) - Henry the Mole
- Kinder Fresh Adventures - video game (2001) - Various characters

=== Dubbing ===
- Cyborg Kuro-chan (TV): Dubbing Director
- Doraemon: (TV 1/1973): Dubbing Director (second dub)
- Doraemon: (TV 2/1979): Dubbing Director (new dub)
- Doraemon: Nobita in Dorabian Nights (movie): Dubbing Director, Dialogues
- Doraemon: Nobita to Kumo no Ōkoku (movie): Dubbing Director, Dialogues
- Dragon Ball GT: A Hero's Legacy (special): Dubbing Director
- Dragon Ball Movie 1: Curse of the Blood Rubies: Dubbing Director (2nd edition)
- Dragon Ball Movie eeping Princess in Devil's Castle: Dubbing Director (2nd edition)
- Dragon Ball Movie 3: Mystical Adventure: Dubbing Director (2nd edition)
- Dragon Ball Move 4: The Path to Power: Dubbing Director (2nd edition)
- Dragon Ball Z Movie 10: Broly Second Coming: Dubbing Director (2nd edition)
- Dragon Ball Z Movie 11: Bio-Broly: Dubbing Director (2nd edition)
- Dragon Ball Z Movie 12: Fusion Reborn: Dubbing Director (2nd edition)
- Dragon Ball Z Movie 13: Wrath of the Dragon: Dubbing Director (2nd edition)
- Dragon Ball Z Movie 1: Dead Zone: Dubbing Director (2nd edition)
- Dragon Ball Z Movie 2: The World's Strongest: Dubbing Director (2nd edition)
- Dragon Ball Z Movie 3: The Tree of Might: Dubbing Director (2edition)
- Dragon Ball Z Movie 4: Lord Slug: Dubbing Director (2nd edition)
- Dragon Ball Z Movie 5: Cooler's Revenge: Dubbing Director (2nd edition)
- Dragon Ball Z Movie 6: Return of Cooler: Dubbing Director (2nd edition)
- Dragon Ball Z Movie 7: Super Android 13: Dubbing Director (2nd edition)
- Dragon Ball Z Movie 8: The Legendary Super Saiyan: Dubbing Director (2nd edition)
- Dragon Ball Z Movie 9: Bojack Unbound: Dubbing Director (2nd edition)
- Dragon Ball Z Special 1: Bardock, The Father of Goku: Dubbing Director (2nd edition)
- Dragon Ball Z Special 2: The History of Trunks: Dubbing Director (2nd edition)
- Fortune Quest L (TV): Dubbing Director
- Grimm Masterpiece Theater (TV): Dubbing Director, Dialogues
- Idol Tenshi Yōkoso Yōko (TV): Dubbing Director
- Kaiketsu Zorro (TV): Dubbing Director
- Kiss me Licia: Andrea
- Maple Town Stories (TV): Dubbing Director
- New Grimm Masterpiece Theater (TV): Dubbing Director, Dialogues
- New Maple Town Stories (TV): Dubbing Director
- Shin Hakkenden (TV): Dubbing Director
- Shirayuki Hime no Densetsu (TV): Dubbing Director, Dialogues
- Tico and Friends (TV): Dubbing Director
- The Adventures of Jimmy Neutron: Boy Genius as Carl Wheezer
- Adventures of Little El Cid (TV) as Ruy
- Ai Shite Knight (TV) as Andrea
- Ai Shoujo Pollyanna Monogatari (TV) as Jamie
- Aoki Densetsu Shoot! (TV) as Fratello di Cindy
- Bakusō Kyōdai Let's & Go!! (TV) as Ricky (Jet 'Let's' Saiba)
- Bakusō Kyōdai Let's & Go!! Max (TV) as Ricky; Ricky (Jet 'Let's' Saiba)
- Bakusō Kyōdai Let's & Go!! WGP (TV) as Ricky (Jet 'Let's' Saiba)
- Beyblade: V-Force (TV) as Jim
- Bosco Daibōken (TV) as Robby
- (The) Bush Baby (TV) as Micky
- City Hunter (TV) as Tommaso (ep 12)
- Cyborg Kuro-chan (TV); Maligno; Robot Creafuoco
- Descendants of Darkness (TV) as Hijiri
- Dragon Ball (TV) as Goku da Adulto; Junior (Piccolo) da Bambino
- Dragon Ball GT (TV) as Gogeta (ep 60); Goku da adulto
- Dragon Ball GT: A Hero's Legacy (special) as Goku
- Dragon Ball Z (TV) as Goku da Adulto; Vegekou (Vegeth)
- Dragon Ball Z Movie 10: Broly – Second Coming as Goku (2nd edition)
- Dragon Ball Z Movie 11: Bio-Broly as Goku (2nd edition)
- Dragon Ball Z Movie 12: Fusion Reborn as Gogeta (2nd edition); Goku (2nd edition)
- Dragon Ball Z Movie 13: Wrath of the Dragon as Goku (2nd edition)
- Dragon Ball Z Movie 1: Dead Zone as Goku (2nd edition)
- Dragon Ball Z Movie 2: The World's Strongest as Goku (2nd edition)
- Dragon Ball Z Movie 3: The Tree of Might as Goku (2nd edition)
- Dragon Ball Z Movie 4: Lord Slug as Goku (2nd edition)
- Dragon Ball Z Movie 5: Cooler's Revenge as Goku (2nd edition)
- Dragon Ball Z Movie 6: Return of Cooler as Goku (2nd edition)
- Dragon Ball Z Movie 7: Super Android 13 as Goku (2nd edition)
- Dragon Ball Z Movie 8: The Legendary Super Saiyan as Goku (2nd edition)
- Dragon Ball Z Movie 9: Bojack Unbound as Goku (2nd edition)
- Dragon Ball Z Special 1: Bardock, The Father of Goku as Goku (2nd edition)
- Honō no Tōkyūji Dodge Danpei (TV) as Marco
- Honoo no Alpen Rose: Judy & Randy (TV) as Randy da bambino
- Huckleberry Finn Monogatari (TV) as Huckleberry Finn
- Idol Densetsu Eriko (TV) as Gianluca
- Jungle Book: Shounen Mowgli (TV) as Mowgli

(*The) Kabocha Wine (TV) as Norman (eps 40–95)

- Katri, Girl of the Meadows (TV) as Martin
- Kirby: Right Back At Ya! (TV) as Tokkori
- A Little Princess Sara (TV) as Donald Carmichael
- Magic Knight Rayearth (TV) as Jack
- Magic Knight Rayearth 2 (TV 2) as Jack
- Magical Angel Creamy Mami (TV) as Mamoru Hidaka
- Magical Fairy Persia (TV) as Dodo; Norinobu
- Magical Star Magical Emi (TV) as B. Junior
- Manga Sarutobi Sasuke (TV) as Sasuke
- One Piece (TV) as Kobi
- Planet Robot Danguard Ace (TV) as Arin (Takuma Ichimonji)
- Pokémon (TV) as Rudy (ep 103)
- Puss 'n Boots (movie) as Pierre (old dub)
- Robin Hood no Daibōken (TV) as March
- Robotech (U.S. TV) as Jason Minmei (The Macross Saga TV Edition); Max Sterling (The Macross Saga TV Edition)
- Romeo and the Black Brothers (TV) as Anselmo
- Sailor Moon (TV) as Sam
- Sailor Moon R (TV) as Sam
- Sailor Moon S (TV) as Sam
- Sailor Moon Sailor Stars (TV) as Sam
- Sailor Moon SuperS (TV) as Sam (Tsukino Shingo)
- Saint Seiya (TV) as Lear
- (The) Super Dimension Cavalry Southern Cross (TV) as Max Sterling
- (The) Super Dimension Fortress Macross: Do You Remember Love? (movie) as Kazikaki
- Tico and Friends (TV) as Toma'
- Time Trouble Tondekeman! (TV) as Gavino
- Tongari Bōshi no Memoru (TV) as Michel; Nicky
- Tongari Bōshi no Memoru: Marielle no Hōsekibako (OAV) as Nicky
- Touch (TV) as Maurizio
- Urusei Yatsura: Beautiful Dreamer (movie) as Ataru
- Vampire Hunter D (OAV) as Dan
